= Academy Award for Best Production Design =

Annual award for art direction in film

- Country: United States
- Presented by: Academy of Motion Picture Arts and Sciences (AMPAS)
- First award: May 16, 1929; 97 years ago (for films released during the 1927/1928 film season)
- Most recent winner: Tamara Deverell, Shane Vieau; Frankenstein (2025)

The Academy Award for Best Production Design recognizes achievement for art direction in film. The category's original name was Best Art Direction, but was changed to its current name in 2012 for the 85th Academy Awards. This change resulted from the Art Directors' branch of the Academy of Motion Picture Arts and Sciences (AMPAS) being renamed the Designers' branch. Since 1947, the award is shared with the set decorators. It is awarded to the best interior design in a film.

The films below are listed with their production year (for example, the 2000 Academy Award for Best Art Direction is given to a film from 1999). In the lists below, the winner of the award for each year is shown first, followed by the other nominees in alphabetical order.

== Superlatives ==
Category	Name	Superlative	Notes
Most Awards	Cedric Gibbons	11 awards	Awards resulted from 39 nominations.
Most Nominations	Cedric Gibbons	39 nominations	Nominations resulted in 11 awards.
Most Nominations (without ever winning)	Roland Anderson	15 nominations	Nominations resulted in no awards.

== Winners and nominees ==
indicates the winner

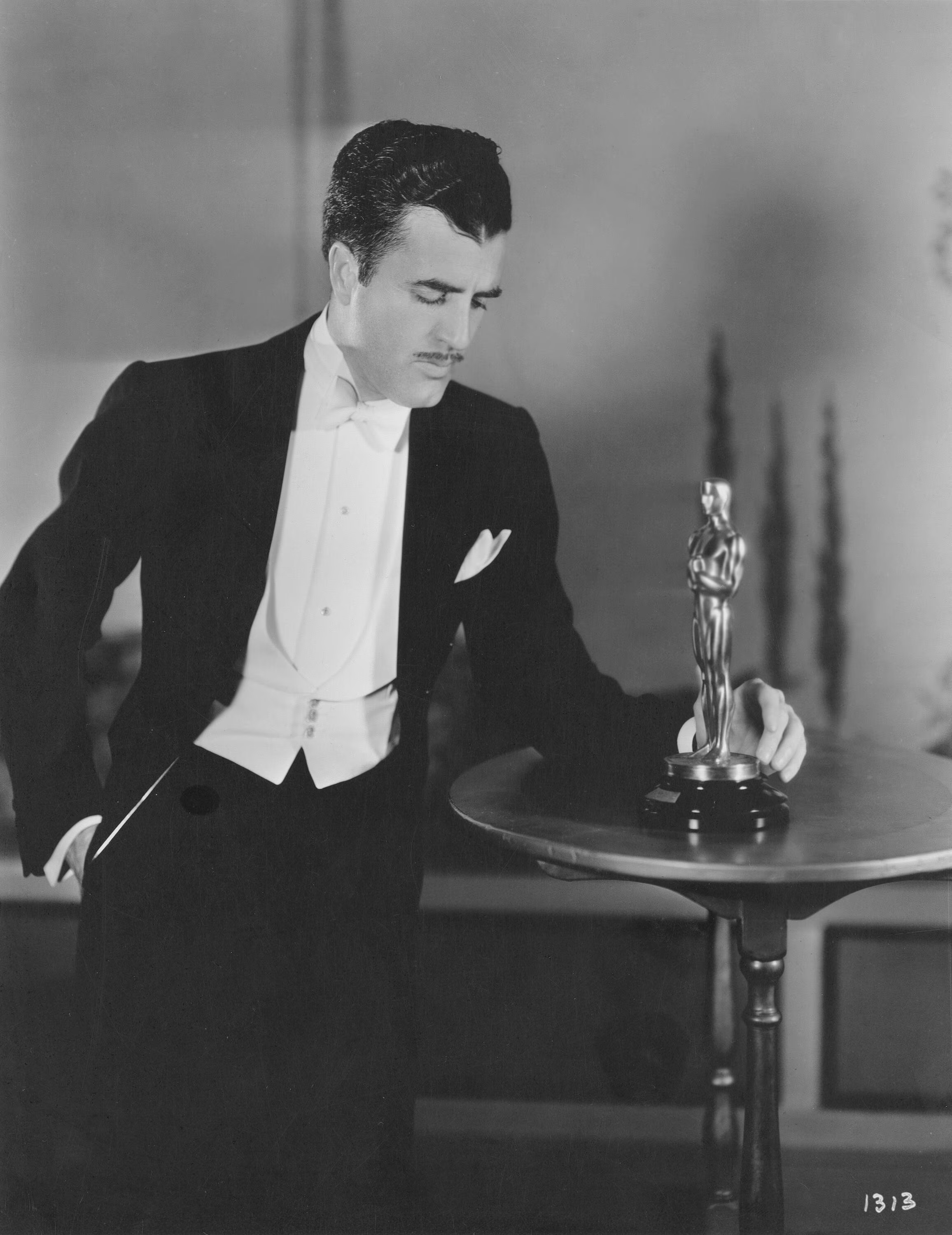
Cedric Gibbons holding his first Academy Award for Best Production Design on April 1930. Gibbons designed the Oscar statuette that's still in use each year.

=== 1920s ===
Year	Film	Art director(s)
1927/28 (1st)	The Dove	William Cameron Menzies
1927/28 (1st)	Tempest	William Cameron Menzies
1927/28 (1st)	7th Heaven	Harry Oliver
1927/28 (1st)	Sunrise: A Song of Two Humans	Rochus Gliese
1928/29 (2nd) (Note: The 2nd Academy Awards is unique in being the only occasion where there were no official nominees. Subsequent research by AMPAS has resulted in a list of unofficial or de facto nominees, based on records of which films were evaluated by the judges.)	The Bridge of San Luis Rey	Cedric Gibbons
1928/29 (2nd)	Alibi	William Cameron Menzies
1928/29 (2nd)	The Awakening	William Cameron Menzies
1928/29 (2nd)	Dynamite	Mitchell Leisen
1928/29 (2nd)	The Patriot	Hans Dreier
1928/29 (2nd)	Street Angel	Harry Oliver

=== 1930s ===
Year	Film	Art director(s)
1929/30 (3rd)	King of Jazz	Herman Rosse
1929/30 (3rd)	Bulldog Drummond	William Cameron Menzies
1929/30 (3rd)	The Love Parade	Hans Dreier
1929/30 (3rd)	Sally	Jack Okey
1929/30 (3rd)	The Vagabond King	Hans Dreier
1930/31 (4th)	Cimarron	Max Rée
1930/31 (4th)	Just Imagine	Stephen Goosson and Ralph Hammeras
1930/31 (4th)	Morocco	Hans Dreier
1930/31 (4th)	Svengali	Anton Grot
1930/31 (4th)	Whoopee!	Richard Day
1931/32 (5th)	Transatlantic	Gordon Wiles
1931/32 (5th)	Arrowsmith	Richard Day
1931/32 (5th)	À Nous la Liberté	Lazare Meerson
1932/33 (6th)	Cavalcade	William S. Darling
1932/33 (6th)	A Farewell to Arms	Hans Dreier and Roland Anderson
1932/33 (6th)	When Ladies Meet	Cedric Gibbons
1934 (7th)	The Merry Widow	Cedric Gibbons and Fredric Hope
1934 (7th)	The Affairs of Cellini	Richard Day
1934 (7th)	The Gay Divorcee	Van Nest Polglase and Carroll Clark
1935 (8th)	The Dark Angel	Richard Day
1935 (8th)	The Lives of a Bengal Lancer	Hans Dreier and Roland Anderson
1935 (8th)	Top Hat	Carroll Clark and Van Nest Polglase
1936 (9th)	Dodsworth	Richard Day
1936 (9th)	Anthony Adverse	Anton Grot
1936 (9th)	The Great Ziegfeld	Cedric Gibbons, Eddie Imazu and Edwin B. Willis
1936 (9th)	Lloyd's of London	William S. Darling
1936 (9th)	The Magnificent Brute	Albert S. D'Agostino and Jack Otterson
1936 (9th)	Romeo and Juliet	Cedric Gibbons, Fredric Hope and Edwin B. Willis
1936 (9th)	Winterset	Perry Ferguson
1937 (10th)	Lost Horizon	Stephen Goosson
1937 (10th)	Conquest	Cedric Gibbons and William A. Horning
1937 (10th)	A Damsel in Distress	Carroll Clark
1937 (10th)	Dead End	Richard Day
1937 (10th)	Every Day's a Holiday	Wiard Ihnen
1937 (10th)	The Life of Emile Zola	Anton Grot
1937 (10th)	Manhattan Merry-Go-Round	John Victor Mackay
1937 (10th)	The Prisoner of Zenda	Lyle R. Wheeler
1937 (10th)	Souls at Sea	Hans Dreier and Roland Anderson
1937 (10th)	Walter Wanger's Vogues of 1938	Alexander Toluboff
1937 (10th)	Wee Willie Winkie	William S. Darling and David S. Hall
1937 (10th)	You're a Sweetheart	Jack Otterson
1938 (11th)	The Adventures of Robin Hood	Carl Jules Weyl
1938 (11th)	The Adventures of Tom Sawyer	Lyle R. Wheeler
1938 (11th)	Alexander's Ragtime Band	Bernard Herzbrun and Boris Leven
1938 (11th)	Algiers	Alexander Toluboff
1938 (11th)	Carefree	Van Nest Polglase
1938 (11th)	The Goldwyn Follies	Richard Day
1938 (11th)	Holiday	Stephen Goosson and Lionel Banks
1938 (11th)	If I Were King	Hans Dreier and John B. Goodman
1938 (11th)	Mad About Music	Jack Otterson
1938 (11th)	Marie Antoinette	Cedric Gibbons
1938 (11th)	Merrily We Live	Charles D. Hall
1939 (12th)	Gone with the Wind	Lyle R. Wheeler
1939 (12th)	Beau Geste	Hans Dreier and Robert Odell
1939 (12th)	Captain Fury	Charles D. Hall
1939 (12th)	First Love	Jack Otterson and Martin Obzina
1939 (12th)	Love Affair	Van Nest Polglase and Alfred Herman
1939 (12th)	Man of Conquest	John Victor Mackay
1939 (12th)	Mr. Smith Goes to Washington	Lionel Banks
1939 (12th)	The Private Lives of Elizabeth and Essex	Anton Grot
1939 (12th)	The Rains Came	William S. Darling and George Dudley
1939 (12th)	Stagecoach	Alexander Toluboff
1939 (12th)	The Wizard of Oz	Cedric Gibbons and William A. Horning
1939 (12th)	Wuthering Heights	James Basevi

=== 1940s ===
Year	Film	Art director(s)	Interior decorator(s)
1940 (13th) (Note: Prior to 1941, only credited art directors and assistant art directors were eligible for nomination.)	Black-and-White		
1940 (13th)	Pride and Prejudice	Cedric Gibbons and Paul Groesse	—
1940 (13th)	Arise, My Love	Hans Dreier and Robert Usher	—
1940 (13th)	Arizona	Lionel Banks and Robert Peterson	—
1940 (13th)	The Boys from Syracuse	Jack Otterson	—
1940 (13th)	Dark Command	John Victor Mackay	—
1940 (13th)	Foreign Correspondent	Alexander Golitzen	—
1940 (13th)	Lillian Russell	Richard Day and Joseph C. Wright	—
1940 (13th)	My Favorite Wife	Van Nest Polglase and Mark-Lee Kirk	—
1940 (13th)	My Son, My Son!	John DuCasse Schulze	—
1940 (13th)	Our Town	Lewis J. Rachmil	—
1940 (13th)	Rebecca	Lyle R. Wheeler	—
1940 (13th)	The Sea Hawk	Anton Grot	—
1940 (13th)	The Westerner	James Basevi	—
1940 (13th)	Color		
1940 (13th)	The Thief of Bagdad	Vincent Korda	—
1940 (13th)	Bitter Sweet	Cedric Gibbons and John S. Detlie	—
1940 (13th)	Down Argentine Way	Richard Day and Joseph C. Wright	—
1940 (13th)	North West Mounted Police	Hans Dreier and Roland Anderson	—
1941 (14th) (Note: Republic Pictures submitted Sis Hopkins and it was initially named as a nominee. However, the studio later withdrew the film from consideration and it is not considered an official nominee.)	Black-and-White		
1941 (14th)	How Green Was My Valley	Richard Day and Nathan Juran	Thomas Little
1941 (14th)	Citizen Kane	Perry Ferguson and Van Nest Polglase	A. Roland Fields and Darrell Silvera
1941 (14th)	The Flame of New Orleans	Martin Obzina and Jack Otterson	Russell A. Gausman
1941 (14th)	Hold Back the Dawn	Hans Dreier and Robert Usher	Samuel M. Comer
1941 (14th)	Ladies in Retirement	Lionel Banks	George Montgomery
1941 (14th)	The Little Foxes	Stephen Goosson	Howard Bristol
1941 (14th)	Sergeant York	John Hughes	Fred M. MacLean
1941 (14th)	The Son of Monte Cristo	John DuCasse Schulze	Edward G. Boyle
1941 (14th)	Sundown	Alexander Golitzen	Richard Irvine
1941 (14th)	That Hamilton Woman	Vincent Korda	Julia Heron
1941 (14th)	When Ladies Meet	Cedric Gibbons and Randall Duell	Edwin B. Willis
1941 (14th)	Color		
1941 (14th)	Blossoms in the Dust	Cedric Gibbons and Urie McCleary	Edwin B. Willis
1941 (14th)	Blood and Sand	Richard Day and Joseph C. Wright	Thomas Little
1941 (14th)	Louisiana Purchase	Raoul Pene Du Bois	Stephen Seymour
1942 (15th)	Black-and-White		
1942 (15th)	This Above All	Richard Day and Joseph C. Wright	Thomas Little
1942 (15th)	George Washington Slept Here	Max Parker and Mark-Lee Kirk	Casey Roberts
1942 (15th)	The Magnificent Ambersons	Albert S. D'Agostino	A. Roland Fields and Darrell Silvera
1942 (15th)	The Pride of the Yankees	Perry Ferguson	Howard Bristol
1942 (15th)	Random Harvest	Cedric Gibbons and Randall Duell	Edwin B. Willis and Jack Moore
1942 (15th)	The Shanghai Gesture	Boris Leven	
1942 (15th)	Silver Queen	Ralph Berger	Emile Kuri
1942 (15th)	The Spoilers	John B. Goodman and Jack Otterson	Russell A. Gausman and Edward Ray Robinson
1942 (15th)	Take a Letter, Darling	Hans Dreier and Roland Anderson	Samuel M. Comer
1942 (15th)	The Talk of the Town	Lionel Banks and Rudolph Sternad	Fay Babcock
1942 (15th)	Color		
1942 (15th)	My Gal Sal	Richard Day and Joseph C. Wright	Thomas Little
1942 (15th)	Arabian Nights	Alexander Golitzen and Jack Otterson	Russell A. Gausman and Ira S. Webb
1942 (15th)	Captains of the Clouds	Ted Smith	Casey Roberts
1942 (15th)	Jungle Book	Vincent Korda	Julia Heron
1942 (15th)	Reap the Wild Wind	Hans Dreier and Roland Anderson	George Sawley
1943 (16th)	Black-and-White		
1943 (16th)	The Song of Bernadette	James Basevi and William S. Darling	Thomas Little
1943 (16th)	Five Graves to Cairo	Hans Dreier and Ernst Fegté	Bertram C. Granger
1943 (16th)	Flight for Freedom	Albert S. D'Agostino and Carroll Clark	Darrell Silvera and Harley Miller
1943 (16th)	Madame Curie	Cedric Gibbons and Paul Groesse	Edwin B. Willis and Hugh Hunt
1943 (16th)	Mission to Moscow	Carl Jules Weyl	George James Hopkins
1943 (16th)	The North Star	Perry Ferguson	Howard Bristol
1943 (16th)	Color		
1943 (16th)	Phantom of the Opera	Alexander Golitzen and John B. Goodman	Russell A. Gausman and Ira S. Webb
1943 (16th)	For Whom the Bell Tolls	Hans Dreier and Haldane Douglas	Bertram C. Granger
1943 (16th)	The Gang's All Here	James Basevi and Joseph C. Wright	Thomas Little
1943 (16th)	This Is the Army	John Hughes	George James Hopkins
1943 (16th)	Thousands Cheer	Cedric Gibbons and Daniel Cathcart	Edwin B. Willis and Jacques Mersereau
1944 (17th) (Note: United Artists submitted Song of the Open Road and it was initially named as a nominee. However, the studio later withdrew the film from consideration and it is not considered an official nominee.)	Black-and-White		
1944 (17th)	Gaslight	Cedric Gibbons and William Ferrari	Paul Huldschinsky and Edwin B. Willis
1944 (17th)	Address Unknown	Lionel Banks and Walter Holscher	Joseph Kish
1944 (17th)	The Adventures of Mark Twain	John Hughes	Fred M. MacLean
1944 (17th)	Casanova Brown	Perry Ferguson	Julia Heron
1944 (17th)	Laura	Lyle R. Wheeler and Leland Fuller	Thomas Little
1944 (17th)	No Time for Love	Hans Dreier and Robert Usher	Samuel M. Comer
1944 (17th)	Since You Went Away	Mark-Lee Kirk	Victor A. Gangelin
1944 (17th)	Step Lively	Albert S. D'Agostino and Carroll Clark	Darrell Silvera and Claude E. Carpenter
1944 (17th)	Color		
1944 (17th)	Wilson	Wiard Ihnen	Thomas Little
1944 (17th)	The Climax	John B. Goodman and Alexander Golitzen	Russell A. Gausman and Ira S. Webb
1944 (17th)	Cover Girl	Lionel Banks and Cary Odell	Fay Babcock
1944 (17th)	The Desert Song	Charles Novi	Jack McConaghy
1944 (17th)	Kismet	Cedric Gibbons and Daniel B. Cathcart	Edwin B. Willis and Richard Pefferle
1944 (17th)	Lady in the Dark	Hans Dreier and Raoul Pene Du Bois	Ray Moyer
1944 (17th)	The Princess and the Pirate	Ernst Fegté	Howard Bristol
1945 (18th)	Black-and-White		
1945 (18th)	Blood on the Sun	Wiard Ihnen	A. Roland Fields
1945 (18th)	Experiment Perilous	Albert S. D'Agostino and Jack Okey	Darrell Silvera and Claude E. Carpenter
1945 (18th)	The Keys of the Kingdom	James Basevi and William S. Darling	Thomas Little and Frank E. Hughes
1945 (18th)	Love Letters	Hans Dreier and Roland Anderson	Samuel M. Comer and Ray Moyer
1945 (18th)	The Picture of Dorian Gray	Cedric Gibbons and Hans Peters	Edwin B. Willis and John Bonar and Hugh Hunt
1945 (18th)	Color		
1945 (18th)	Frenchman's Creek	Hans Dreier and Ernst Fegté	Samuel M. Comer
1945 (18th)	Leave Her to Heaven	Lyle R. Wheeler and Maurice Ransford	Thomas Little
1945 (18th)	National Velvet	Cedric Gibbons and Urie McCleary	Edwin B. Willis and Mildred Griffiths
1945 (18th)	San Antonio	Ted Smith	Jack McConaghy
1945 (18th)	A Thousand and One Nights	Stephen Goosson and Rudolph Sternad	Frank Tuttle
1946 (19th)	Black-and-White		
1946 (19th)	Anna and the King of Siam	William S. Darling and Lyle R. Wheeler	Thomas Little and Frank E. Hughes
1946 (19th)	Kitty	Hans Dreier and Walter H. Tyler	Samuel M. Comer and Ray Moyer
1946 (19th)	The Razor's Edge	Richard Day and Nathan H. Juran	Thomas Little and Paul S. Fox
1946 (19th)	Color		
1946 (19th)	The Yearling	Cedric Gibbons and Paul Groesse	Edwin B. Willis
1946 (19th)	Caesar and Cleopatra	John Bryan	—
1946 (19th)	Henry V	Paul Sheriff and Carmen Dillon	—
1947 (20th)	Black-and-White		
1947 (20th)	Great Expectations	Wilfred Shingleton	John Bryan
1947 (20th)	The Foxes of Harrow	Lyle R. Wheeler and Maurice Ransford	Thomas Little and Paul S. Fox
1947 (20th)	Color		
1947 (20th)	Black Narcissus	Alfred Junge	—
1947 (20th)	Life with Father	Robert M. Haas	George James Hopkins
1948 (21st)	Black-and-White		
1948 (21st)	Hamlet	Roger K. Furse	Carmen Dillon
1948 (21st)	Johnny Belinda	Robert M. Haas	William O. Wallace
1948 (21st)	Color		
1948 (21st)	The Red Shoes	Hein Heckroth	Arthur Lawson
1948 (21st)	Joan of Arc	Richard Day	Edwin Casey Roberts and Joseph Kish
1949 (22nd)	Black-and-White		
1949 (22nd)	The Heiress	Harry Horner and John Meehan	Emile Kuri
1949 (22nd)	Come to the Stable	Lyle R. Wheeler and Joseph C. Wright	Thomas Little and Paul S. Fox
1949 (22nd)	Madame Bovary	Cedric Gibbons and Jack Martin Smith	Edwin B. Willis and Richard A. Pefferle
1949 (22nd)	Color		
1949 (22nd)	Little Women	Cedric Gibbons and Paul Groesse	Edwin B. Willis and Jack D. Moore
1949 (22nd)	Adventures of Don Juan	Edward Carrere	Lyle Reifsnider
1949 (22nd)	Saraband	Jim Morahan and William Kellner	Michael Relph

=== 1950s ===
Year	Film	Art director(s)	Set decorator(s)
1950 (23rd)	Black-and-White		
1950 (23rd)	Sunset Boulevard	Hans Dreier and John Meehan	Samuel M. Comer and Ray Moyer
1950 (23rd)	All About Eve	George W. Davis and Lyle R. Wheeler	Thomas Little and Walter M. Scott
1950 (23rd)	The Red Danube	Cedric Gibbons and Hans Peters	Edwin B. Willis and Hugh Hunt
1950 (23rd)	Color		
1950 (23rd)	Samson and Delilah	Hans Dreier and Walter H. Tyler	Samuel M. Comer and Ray Moyer
1950 (23rd)	Annie Get Your Gun	Cedric Gibbons and Paul Groesse	Edwin B. Willis and Richard A. Pefferle
1950 (23rd)	Destination Moon	Ernst Fegté	George Sawley
1951 (24th)	Black-and-White		
1951 (24th)	A Streetcar Named Desire	Richard Day	George James Hopkins
1951 (24th)	Fourteen Hours	Leland Fuller and Lyle R. Wheeler	Thomas Little and Fred J. Rode
1951 (24th)	The House on Telegraph Hill	John DeCuir and Lyle R. Wheeler	Paul S. Fox and Thomas Little
1951 (24th)	La Ronde	D'Eaubonne	—
1951 (24th)	Too Young to Kiss	Cedric Gibbons and Paul Groesse	Edwin B. Willis and Jack D. Moore
1951 (24th)	Color		
1951 (24th)	An American in Paris	E. Preston Ames and Cedric Gibbons	Edwin B. Willis and F. Keogh Gleason
1951 (24th)	David and Bathsheba	George Davis and Lyle R. Wheeler	Paul S. Fox and Thomas Little
1951 (24th)	On the Riviera	Leland Fuller, Lyle R. Wheeler and Joseph C. Wright (musical settings)	Thomas Little and Walter M. Scott
1951 (24th)	Quo Vadis	Edward Carfagno, Cedric Gibbons and William A. Horning	Hugh Hunt
1951 (24th)	The Tales of Hoffmann	Hein Heckroth	—
1952 (25th)	Black-and-White		
1952 (25th)	The Bad and the Beautiful	Edward Carfagno and Cedric Gibbons	F. Keogh Gleason and Edwin B. Willis
1952 (25th)	Carrie	Roland Anderson and Hal Pereira	Emile Kuri
1952 (25th)	My Cousin Rachel	John DeCuir and Lyle R. Wheeler	Walter M. Scott
1952 (25th)	Rashomon	So Matsuyama	H. Motsumoto
1952 (25th)	Viva Zapata!	Leland Fuller and Lyle R. Wheeler	Claude E. Carpenter and Thomas Little
1952 (25th)	Color		
1952 (25th)	Moulin Rouge	Paul Sheriff	Marcel Vertès
1952 (25th)	Hans Christian Andersen	Clavé and Richard Day	Howard Bristol
1952 (25th)	The Merry Widow	Cedric Gibbons and Paul Groesse	Arthur Krams and Edwin B. Willis
1952 (25th)	The Quiet Man	Frank Hotaling	John McCarthy Jr. and Charles S. Thompson
1952 (25th)	The Snows of Kilimanjaro	John DeCuir and Lyle R. Wheeler	Paul S. Fox and Thomas Little
1953 (26th)	Black-and-White		
1953 (26th)	Julius Caesar	Edward Carfagno and Cedric Gibbons	Hugh Hunt and Edwin B. Willis
1953 (26th)	Martin Luther	Paul Markwitz and Fritz Maurischat	—
1953 (26th)	The President's Lady	Leland Fuller and Lyle R. Wheeler	Paul S. Fox
1953 (26th)	Roman Holiday	Hal Pereira and Walter H. Tyler	—
1953 (26th)	Titanic	Maurice Ransford and Lyle R. Wheeler	Stuart Reiss
1953 (26th)	Color		
1953 (26th)	The Robe	George Davis and Lyle R. Wheeler	Paul S. Fox and Walter M. Scott
1953 (26th)	Knights of the Round Table	Alfred Junge and Hans Peters	John Jarvis
1953 (26th)	Lili	Cedric Gibbons and Paul Groesse	Arthur Krams and Edwin B. Willis
1953 (26th)	The Story of Three Loves	E. Preston Ames, Edward Carfagno, Cedric Gibbons and Gabriel Scognamillo	F. Keogh Gleason, Arthur Krams, Jack D. Moore and Edwin B. Willis
1953 (26th)	Young Bess	Cedric Gibbons and Urie McCleary	Jack D. Moore and Edwin B. Willis
1954 (27th)	Black-and-White		
1954 (27th)	On the Waterfront	Richard Day	—
1954 (27th)	The Country Girl	Roland Anderson and Hal Pereira	Samuel M. Comer and Grace Gregory
1954 (27th)	Executive Suite	Cedric Gibbons and Edward Carfagno	Edwin B. Willis and Emile Kuri
1954 (27th)	Le Plaisir	Max Ophüls	—
1954 (27th)	Sabrina	Hal Pereira and Walter H. Tyler	Samuel M. Comer and Ray Moyer
1954 (27th)	Color		
1954 (27th)	20,000 Leagues Under the Sea	John Meehan	Emile Kuri
1954 (27th)	Brigadoon	Cedric Gibbons and E. Preston Ames	Edwin B. Willis and F. Keogh Gleason
1954 (27th)	Desiree	Lyle R. Wheeler and Leland Fuller	Walter M. Scott and Paul S. Fox
1954 (27th)	Red Garters	Hal Pereira and Roland Anderson	Samuel M. Comer and Ray Moyer
1954 (27th)	A Star Is Born	Malcolm Bert and Gene Allen	Irene Sharaff and George James Hopkins
1955 (28th)	Black-and-White		
1955 (28th)	The Rose Tattoo	Hal Pereira and Tambi Larsen	Samuel M. Comer and Arthur Krams
1955 (28th)	Blackboard Jungle	Cedric Gibbons and Randall Duell	Edwin B. Willis and Henry Grace
1955 (28th)	I'll Cry Tomorrow	Cedric Gibbons and Malcolm Brown	Edwin B. Willis and Hugh Hunt
1955 (28th)	The Man with the Golden Arm	Joseph C. Wright	Darrell Silvera
1955 (28th)	Marty	Edward S. Haworth and Walter M. Simonds	Robert Priestley
1955 (28th)	Color		
1955 (28th)	Picnic	William Flannery and Jo Mielziner	Robert Priestley
1955 (28th)	Daddy Long Legs	Lyle R. Wheeler and John DeCuir	Walter M. Scott and Paul S. Fox
1955 (28th)	Guys and Dolls	Oliver Smith and Joseph C. Wright	Howard Bristol
1955 (28th)	Love Is a Many-Splendored Thing	Lyle R. Wheeler and George Davis	Walter M. Scott and Jack Stubbs
1955 (28th)	To Catch a Thief	Hal Pereira and Joseph McMillan Johnson	Samuel M. Comer and Arthur Krams
1956 (29th)	Black-and-White		
1956 (29th)	Somebody Up There Likes Me	Cedric Gibbons and Malcolm Brown	Edwin B. Willis and F. Keogh Gleason
1956 (29th)	Seven Samurai	So Matsuyama	—
1956 (29th)	The Proud and Profane	Hal Pereira and A. Earl Hedrick	Samuel M. Comer and Frank R. McKelvy
1956 (29th)	The Solid Gold Cadillac	Ross Bellah	William Kiernan and Louis Diage
1956 (29th)	Teenage Rebel	Lyle R. Wheeler and Jack Martin Smith	Walter M. Scott and Stuart A. Reiss
1956 (29th)	Color		
1956 (29th)	The King and I	Lyle R. Wheeler and John DeCuir	Walter M. Scott and Paul S. Fox
1956 (29th)	Around the World in 80 Days	James W. Sullivan and Ken Adam	Ross J. Dowd
1956 (29th)	Giant	Boris Leven	Ralph S. Hurst
1956 (29th)	Lust for Life	Cedric Gibbons and Hans Peters and E. Preston Ames	Edwin B. Willis and F. Keogh Gleason
1956 (29th)	The Ten Commandments	Walter H. Tyler and Albert Nozaki	Samuel M. Comer and Ray Moyer
1957 (30th) (Note: In 1957 and 1958, black-and-white and color films competed in a combined Best Art Direction category.)
1957 (30th)	Sayonara	Ted Haworth	Robert Priestley
1957 (30th)	Funny Face	Hal Pereira and George Davis	Samuel M. Comer and Ray Moyer
1957 (30th)	Les Girls	William A. Horning and Gene Allen	Edwin B. Willis and Richard Pefferle
1957 (30th)	Pal Joey	Walter Holscher	William Kiernan and Louis Diage
1957 (30th)	Raintree County	William A. Horning and Urie McCleary	Edwin B. Willis and Hugh Hunt
1958 (31st)
1958 (31st)	Gigi	William A. Horning (posthumous award) and E. Preston Ames	Henry Grace and F. Keogh Gleason
1958 (31st)	Auntie Mame	Malcolm Bert	George James Hopkins
1958 (31st)	Bell, Book and Candle	Cary Odell	Louis Diage
1958 (31st)	A Certain Smile	Lyle R. Wheeler and John DeCuir	Walter M. Scott and Paul S. Fox
1958 (31st)	Vertigo	Hal Pereira and Henry Bumstead	Samuel M. Comer and Frank McKelvy
1959 (32nd)	Black-and-White		
1959 (32nd)	The Diary of Anne Frank	Lyle R. Wheeler and George Davis	Walter M. Scott and Stuart A. Reiss
1959 (32nd)	Career	Hal Pereira and Walter H. Tyler	Samuel M. Comer and Arthur Krams
1959 (32nd)	The Last Angry Man	Carl Anderson	William Kiernan
1959 (32nd)	Some Like It Hot	Ted Haworth	Edward G. Boyle
1959 (32nd)	Suddenly, Last Summer	Oliver Messel and William Kellner	Scott Slimon
1959 (32nd)	Color		
1959 (32nd)	Ben-Hur	William A. Horning (posthumous award) and Edward Carfagno	Hugh Hunt
1959 (32nd)	The Big Fisherman	John DeCuir	Julia Heron
1959 (32nd)	Journey to the Center of the Earth	Lyle R. Wheeler, Franz Bachelin and Herman A. Blumenthal	Walter M. Scott and Joseph Kish
1959 (32nd)	North by Northwest	William A. Horning (posthumous nomination), Robert F. Boyle and Merrill Pye	Henry Grace and Frank McKelvy
1959 (32nd)	Pillow Talk	Richard H. Riedel (posthumous nomination)	Russell A. Gausman and Ruby R. Levitt

=== 1960s ===
Year	Film	Art director(s)	Set decorator(s)
1960 (33rd)	Black-and-White		
1960 (33rd)	The Apartment	Alexandre Trauner	Edward G. Boyle
1960 (33rd)	The Facts of Life	Joseph McMillan Johnson and Kenneth A. Reid	Ross Dowd
1960 (33rd)	Psycho	Joseph Hurley and Robert Clatworthy	George Milo
1960 (33rd)	Sons and Lovers	Tom Morahan	Lionel Couch
1960 (33rd)	Visit to a Small Planet	Hal Pereira and Walter Tyler	Samuel M. Comer and Arthur Krams
1960 (33rd)	Color		
1960 (33rd)	Spartacus	Alexander Golitzen and Eric Orbom	Russell A. Gausman and Julia Heron
1960 (33rd)	Cimarron	George Davis and Addison Hehr	Henry Grace, Hugh Hunt and Otto Siegel
1960 (33rd)	It Started in Naples	Hal Pereira and Roland Anderson	Samuel M. Comer and Arrigo Breschi
1960 (33rd)	Pepe	Ted Haworth	William Kiernan
1960 (33rd)	Sunrise at Campobello	Edward Carrere	George James Hopkins
1961 (34th)	Black-and-White		
1961 (34th)	The Hustler	Harry Horner	Gene Callahan
1961 (34th)	The Absent-Minded Professor	Carroll Clark	Emile Kuri and Hal Gausman
1961 (34th)	The Children's Hour	Fernando Carrere	Edward G. Boyle
1961 (34th)	Judgment at Nuremberg	Rudolph Sternad	George Milo
1961 (34th)	La Dolce Vita	Piero Gherardi	—
1961 (34th)	Color		
1961 (34th)	West Side Story	Boris Leven	Victor A. Gangelin
1961 (34th)	Breakfast at Tiffany's	Hal Pereira and Roland Anderson	Samuel M. Comer and Ray Moyer
1961 (34th)	El Cid	Veniero Colasanti and John Moore	—
1961 (34th)	Flower Drum Song	Alexander Golitzen and Joseph C. Wright	Howard Bristol
1961 (34th)	Summer and Smoke	Hal Pereira and Walter Tyler	Samuel M. Comer and Arthur Krams
1962 (35th)	Black-and-White		
1962 (35th)	To Kill a Mockingbird	Alexander Golitzen and Henry Bumstead	Oliver Emert
1962 (35th)	Days of Wine and Roses	Joseph C. Wright	George James Hopkins
1962 (35th)	The Longest Day	Ted Haworth, Léon Barsacq and Vincent Korda	Gabriel Béchir
1962 (35th)	Period of Adjustment	George Davis and Edward Carfagno	Henry Grace and Richard Pefferle
1962 (35th)	The Pigeon That Took Rome	Hal Pereira and Roland Anderson	Samuel M. Comer and Frank R. McKelvy
1962 (35th)	Color		
1962 (35th)	Lawrence of Arabia	John Box and John Stoll	Dario Simoni
1962 (35th)	The Music Man	Paul Groesse	George James Hopkins
1962 (35th)	Mutiny on the Bounty	George Davis and Joseph McMillan Johnson	Henry Grace and Hugh Hunt
1962 (35th)	That Touch of Mink	Alexander Golitzen and Robert Clatworthy	George Milo
1962 (35th)	The Wonderful World of the Brothers Grimm	George Davis and Edward Carfagno	Henry Grace and Richard Pefferle
1963 (36th)	Black-and-White		
1963 (36th)	America America	Gene Callahan	—
1963 (36th)	8½	Piero Gherardi	—
1963 (36th)	Hud	Hal Pereira and Tambi Larsen	Samuel M. Comer and Robert R. Benton
1963 (36th)	Love with the Proper Stranger	Hal Pereira and Roland Anderson	Samuel M. Comer and Grace Gregory
1963 (36th)	Twilight of Honor	George Davis and Paul Groesse	Henry Grace and Hugh Hunt
1963 (36th)	Color		
1963 (36th)	Cleopatra	John DeCuir, Jack Martin Smith, Hilyard M. Brown, Herman A. Blumenthal, Elven Webb, Maurice Pelling and Boris Juraga	Walter M. Scott, Paul S. Fox and Ray Moyer
1963 (36th)	The Cardinal	Lyle R. Wheeler	Gene Callahan
1963 (36th)	Come Blow Your Horn	Hal Pereira and Roland Anderson	Samuel M. Comer and James W. Payne
1963 (36th)	How the West Was Won	George Davis, William Ferrari (posthumous nomination) and Addison Hehr	Henry Grace, Don Greenwood Jr. and Jack Mills
1963 (36th)	Tom Jones	Ralph W. Brinton, Jocelyn Herbert, and Ted Marshall	Josie MacAvin
1964 (37th)	Black-and-White		
1964 (37th)	Zorba the Greek	Vassilis Photopoulos	—
1964 (37th)	The Americanization of Emily	George Davis, Hans Peters and Elliot Scott	Henry Grace and Robert R. Benton
1964 (37th)	Hush...Hush, Sweet Charlotte	William Glasgow	Raphaël Bretton
1964 (37th)	The Night of the Iguana	Stephen B. Grimes	—
1964 (37th)	Seven Days in May	Cary Odell	Edward G. Boyle
1964 (37th)	Color		
1964 (37th)	My Fair Lady	Gene Allen and Cecil Beaton	George James Hopkins
1964 (37th)	Becket	John Bryan and Maurice Carter	Patrick McLoughlin and Robert Cartwright
1964 (37th)	Mary Poppins	Carroll Clark and William H. Tuntke	Emile Kuri and Hal Gausman
1964 (37th)	The Unsinkable Molly Brown	George Davis and E. Preston Ames	Henry Grace and Hugh Hunt
1964 (37th)	What a Way to Go!	Jack Martin Smith and Ted Haworth	Walter M. Scott and Stuart A. Reiss
1965 (38th)	Black-and-White		
1965 (38th)	Ship of Fools	Robert Clatworthy	Joseph Kish
1965 (38th)	King Rat	Robert Emmet Smith	Frank Tuttle
1965 (38th)	A Patch of Blue	George Davis and Urie McCleary	Henry Grace and Charles S. Thompson
1965 (38th)	The Slender Thread	Hal Pereira and Jack Poplin	Robert R. Benton and Joseph Kish
1965 (38th)	The Spy Who Came In from the Cold	Hal Pereira and Tambi Larsen	Ted Marshall and Josie MacAvin
1965 (38th)	Color		
1965 (38th)	Doctor Zhivago	John Box and Terence Marsh	Dario Simoni
1965 (38th)	The Agony and the Ecstasy	John DeCuir and Jack Martin Smith	Dario Simoni
1965 (38th)	The Greatest Story Ever Told	Richard Day, William Creber and David S. Hall (posthumous nomination)	Ray Moyer and Fred M. MacLean and Norman Rockett
1965 (38th)	Inside Daisy Clover	Robert Clatworthy	George James Hopkins
1965 (38th)	The Sound of Music	Boris Leven	Walter M. Scott and Ruby Levitt
1966 (39th)	Black-and-White		
1966 (39th)	Who's Afraid of Virginia Woolf?	Richard Sylbert	George James Hopkins
1966 (39th)	The Fortune Cookie	Robert Luthardt	Edward G. Boyle
1966 (39th)	The Gospel According to St. Matthew	Luigi Scaccianoce	—
1966 (39th)	Is Paris Burning?	Willy Holt	Marc Frédérix and Pierre Guffroy
1966 (39th)	Mister Buddwing	George Davis and Paul Groesse	Henry Grace and Hugh Hunt
1966 (39th)	Color		
1966 (39th)	Fantastic Voyage	Jack Martin Smith and Dale Hennesy	Walter M. Scott and Stuart A. Reiss
1966 (39th)	Gambit	Alexander Golitzen and George C. Webb	John McCarthy Jr. and John P. Austin
1966 (39th)	Juliet of the Spirits	Piero Gherardi	—
1966 (39th)	The Oscar	Hal Pereira and Arthur Lonergan	Robert R. Benton and James W. Payne
1966 (39th)	The Sand Pebbles	Boris Leven	Walter M. Scott, John Sturtevant and William Kiernan
1967 (40th)	Camelot	John Truscott and Edward Carrere	John W. Brown
1967 (40th)	Doctor Dolittle	Mario Chiari, Jack Martin Smith and Ed Graves	Walter M. Scott and Stuart A. Reiss
1967 (40th)	Guess Who's Coming to Dinner	Robert Clatworthy	Frank Tuttle
1967 (40th)	The Taming of the Shrew	Renzo Mongiardino, John DeCuir, Elven Webb and Giuseppe Mariani	Dario Simoni and Luigi Gervasi
1967 (40th)	Thoroughly Modern Millie	Alexander Golitzen and George C. Webb	Howard Bristol
1968 (41st)	Oliver!	John Box and Terence Marsh	Vernon Dixon and Ken Muggleston
1968 (41st)	The Shoes of the Fisherman	George Davis and Edward Carfagno	—
1968 (41st)	Star!	Boris Leven	Walter M. Scott and Howard Bristol
1968 (41st)	2001: A Space Odyssey	Anthony Masters, Harry Lange and Ernest Archer	—
1968 (41st)	War and Peace	Mikhail Bogdanov and Gennady Myasnikov	Georgi Koshelev and Vladimir Uvarov
1969 (42nd)	Hello, Dolly!	John DeCuir, Jack Martin Smith and Herman A. Blumenthal	Walter M. Scott, George James Hopkins and Raphaël Bretton
1969 (42nd)	Anne of the Thousand Days	Maurice Carter and Lionel Couch	Patrick McLoughlin
1969 (42nd)	Gaily, Gaily	Robert F. Boyle and George B. Chan	Edward G. Boyle and Carl Biddiscombe
1969 (42nd)	Sweet Charity	Alexander Golitzen and George C. Webb	Jack D. Moore
1969 (42nd)	They Shoot Horses, Don't They?	Harry Horner	Frank R. McKelvy

=== 1970s ===
Year	Film	Art director(s)	Set decorator(s)
1970 (43rd)	Patton	Urie McCleary and Gil Parrondo	Antonio Mateos and Pierre-Louis Thévenet
1970 (43rd)	Airport	Alexander Golitzen and E. Preston Ames	Jack D. Moore and Mickey S. Michaels
1970 (43rd)	The Molly Maguires	Tambi Larsen	Darrell Silvera
1970 (43rd)	Scrooge	Terence Marsh and Robert Cartwright	Pamela Cornell
1970 (43rd)	Tora! Tora! Tora!	Jack Martin Smith, Yoshirō Muraki, Richard Day and Taizô Kawashima	Walter M. Scott, Norman Rockett and Carl Biddiscombe
1971 (44th)	Nicholas and Alexandra	John Box, Ernest Archer, Jack Maxsted and Gil Parrondo	Vernon Dixon
1971 (44th)	The Andromeda Strain	Boris Leven and William H. Tuntke	Ruby Levitt
1971 (44th)	Bedknobs and Broomsticks	John B. Mansbridge and Peter Ellenshaw	Emile Kuri and Hal Gausman
1971 (44th)	Fiddler on the Roof	Robert F. Boyle and Michael Stringer	Peter Lamont
1971 (44th)	Mary, Queen of Scots	Terence Marsh and Robert Cartwright	Peter Howitt
1972 (45th)	Cabaret	Rolf Zehetbauer and Hans Jürgen Kiebach	Herbert Strabel
1972 (45th)	Lady Sings the Blues	Carl Anderson	Reg Allen
1972 (45th)	The Poseidon Adventure	William Creber	Raphaël Bretton
1972 (45th)	Travels with My Aunt	John Box, Gil Parrondo and Robert W. Laing	—
1972 (45th)	Young Winston	Donald M. Ashton and Geoffrey Drake	John Graysmark, William Hutchinson and Peter James
1973 (46th)	The Sting	Henry Bumstead	James W. Payne
1973 (46th)	Brother Sun, Sister Moon	Lorenzo Mongiardino and Gianni Quaranta	Carmelo Patrono
1973 (46th)	The Exorcist	Bill Malley	Jerry Wunderlich
1973 (46th)	Tom Sawyer	Philip M. Jefferies	Robert De Vestel
1973 (46th)	The Way We Were	Stephen B. Grimes	William Kiernan (posthumous nomination)
1974 (47th)	The Godfather Part II	Dean Tavoularis and Angelo P. Graham	George R. Nelson
1974 (47th)	Chinatown	Richard Sylbert and W. Stewart Campbell	Ruby Levitt
1974 (47th)	Earthquake	Alexander Golitzen and E. Preston Ames	Frank R. McKelvy
1974 (47th)	The Island at the Top of the World	Peter Ellenshaw, John B. Mansbridge, Walter Tyler and Al Roelofs	Hal Gausman
1974 (47th)	The Towering Inferno	William Creber and Ward Preston	Raphaël Bretton
1975 (48th)	Barry Lyndon	Ken Adam and Roy Walker	Vernon Dixon
1975 (48th)	The Hindenburg	Edward Carfagno	Frank R. McKelvy
1975 (48th)	The Man Who Would Be King	Alexandre Trauner and Tony Inglis	Peter James
1975 (48th)	Shampoo	Richard Sylbert and W. Stewart Campbell	George Gaines
1975 (48th)	The Sunshine Boys	Albert Brenner	Marvin March
1976 (49th)	All the President's Men	George Jenkins	George Gaines
1976 (49th)	The Incredible Sarah	Elliot Scott	Norman Reynolds
1976 (49th)	The Last Tycoon	Gene Callahan and Jack T. Collis	Jerry Wunderlich
1976 (49th)	Logan's Run	Dale Hennesy	Robert De Vestel
1976 (49th)	The Shootist	Robert F. Boyle	Arthur Jeph Parker
1977 (50th)	Star Wars	John Barry, Norman Reynolds and Leslie Dilley	Roger Christian
1977 (50th)	Airport '77	George C. Webb	Mickey S. Michaels
1977 (50th)	Close Encounters of the Third Kind	Joe Alves and Dan Lomino	Phil Abramson
1977 (50th)	The Spy Who Loved Me	Ken Adam and Peter Lamont	Hugh Scaife
1977 (50th)	The Turning Point	Albert Brenner	Marvin March
1978 (51st)	Heaven Can Wait	Paul Sylbert and Edwin O'Donovan	George Gaines
1978 (51st)	The Brink's Job	Dean Tavoularis and Angelo P. Graham	George R. Nelson and Bruce Kay
1978 (51st)	California Suite	Albert Brenner	Marvin March
1978 (51st)	Interiors	Mel Bourne	Daniel Robert
1978 (51st)	The Wiz	Tony Walton and Philip Rosenberg	Edward Stewart and Robert Drumheller
1979 (52nd)	All That Jazz	Philip Rosenberg and Tony Walton	Edward Stewart and Gary J. Brink
1979 (52nd)	Alien	Michael Seymour, Leslie Dilley and Roger Christian	Ian Whittaker
1979 (52nd)	Apocalypse Now	Dean Tavoularis and Angelo P. Graham	George R. Nelson
1979 (52nd)	The China Syndrome	George Jenkins	Arthur Jeph Parker
1979 (52nd)	Star Trek: The Motion Picture	Harold Michelson, Joe Jennings, Leon Harris and John Vallone	Linda DeScenna

=== 1980s ===
Year	Film	Art director(s)	Set decorator(s)
1980 (53rd)	Tess	Pierre Guffroy and Jack Stephens	—
1980 (53rd)	Coal Miner's Daughter	John W. Corso	John M. Dwyer
1980 (53rd)	The Elephant Man	Stuart Craig and Robert Cartwright	Hugh Scaife
1980 (53rd)	The Empire Strikes Back	Norman Reynolds, Leslie Dilley, Harry Lange and Alan Tomkins	Michael D. Ford
1980 (53rd)	Kagemusha	Yoshirō Muraki	—
1981 (54th)	Raiders of the Lost Ark	Norman Reynolds and Leslie Dilley	Michael D. Ford
1981 (54th)	The French Lieutenant's Woman	Assheton Gorton	Ann Mollo
1981 (54th)	Heaven's Gate	Tambi Larsen	James L. Berkey
1981 (54th)	Ragtime	John Graysmark, Patrizia von Brandenstein and Tony Reading	George DeTitta Sr., George DeTitta Jr. and Peter Howitt
1981 (54th)	Reds	Richard Sylbert	Michael Seirton
1982 (55th)	Gandhi	Stuart Craig and Robert W. Laing	Michael Seirton
1982 (55th)	Annie	Dale Hennesy (posthumous nomination)	Marvin March
1982 (55th)	Blade Runner	Lawrence G. Paull and David L. Snyder	Linda DeScenna
1982 (55th)	La Traviata	Franco Zeffirelli and Gianni Quaranta	—
1982 (55th)	Victor/Victoria	Rodger Maus, Tim Hutchinson and William Craig Smith	Harry Cordwell
1983 (56th)	Fanny and Alexander	Anna Asp	—
1983 (56th)	Return of the Jedi	Norman Reynolds, Fred Hole and James L. Schoppe	Michael D. Ford
1983 (56th)	The Right Stuff	Geoffrey Kirkland, Richard Lawrence, W. Stewart Campbell and Peter R. Romero	Jim Poynter and George R. Nelson
1983 (56th)	Terms of Endearment	Polly Platt and Harold Michelson	Tom Pedigo and Anthony Mondell
1983 (56th)	Yentl	Roy Walker and Leslie Tomkins	Tessa Davies
1984 (57th)	Amadeus	Patrizia von Brandenstein and Karel Černý	—
1984 (57th)	2010	Albert Brenner	Rick Simpson
1984 (57th)	The Cotton Club	Richard Sylbert	George Gaines
1984 (57th)	The Natural	Mel Bourne and Angelo P. Graham	Bruce Weintraub
1984 (57th)	A Passage to India	John Box	Hugh Scaife
1985 (58th)	Out of Africa	Stephen B. Grimes	Josie MacAvin
1985 (58th)	Brazil	Norman Garwood	Maggie Gray
1985 (58th)	The Color Purple	J. Michael Riva and Bo Welch	Linda DeScenna
1985 (58th)	Ran	Yoshirō Muraki and Shinobu Muraki	—
1985 (58th)	Witness	Stan Jolley	John H. Anderson
1986 (59th)	A Room with a View	Gianni Quaranta and Brian Ackland-Snow	Brian Savegar and Elio Altramura
1986 (59th)	Aliens	Peter Lamont	Crispian Sallis
1986 (59th)	The Color of Money	Boris Leven	Karen O'Hara
1986 (59th)	Hannah and Her Sisters	Stuart Wurtzel	Carol Joffe
1986 (59th)	The Mission	Stuart Craig	Jack Stephens
1987 (60th)	The Last Emperor	Ferdinando Scarfiotti	Bruno Cesari and Osvaldo Desideri
1987 (60th)	Empire of the Sun	Norman Reynolds	Harry Cordwell
1987 (60th)	Hope and Glory	Anthony Pratt	Joanne Woollard
1987 (60th)	Radio Days	Santo Loquasto	Carol Joffe, Leslie Bloom and George DeTitta Jr.
1987 (60th)	The Untouchables	Patrizia von Brandenstein and William A. Elliott	Hal Gausman
1988 (61st)	Dangerous Liaisons	Stuart Craig	Gérard James
1988 (61st)	Beaches	Albert Brenner	Garrett Lewis
1988 (61st)	Rain Man	Ida Random	Linda DeScenna
1988 (61st)	Tucker: The Man and His Dream	Dean Tavoularis	Armin Ganz
1988 (61st)	Who Framed Roger Rabbit	Elliot Scott	Peter Howitt
1989 (62nd)	Batman	Anton Furst	Peter Young
1989 (62nd)	The Abyss	Leslie Dilley	Anne Kuljian
1989 (62nd)	The Adventures of Baron Munchausen	Dante Ferretti	Francesca Lo Schiavo
1989 (62nd)	Driving Miss Daisy	Bruno Rubeo	Crispian Sallis
1989 (62nd)	Glory	Norman Garwood	Garrett Lewis

=== 1990s ===
Year	Film	Art director(s)	Set decorator(s)
1990 (63rd)	Dick Tracy	Richard Sylbert	Rick Simpson
1990 (63rd)	Cyrano de Bergerac	Ezio Frigerio	Jacques Rouxel
1990 (63rd)	Dances With Wolves	Jeffrey Beecroft	Lisa Dean
1990 (63rd)	The Godfather Part III	Dean Tavoularis	Gary Fettis
1990 (63rd)	Hamlet	Dante Ferretti	Francesca Lo Schiavo
1991 (64th)	Bugsy	Dennis Gassner	Nancy Haigh
1991 (64th)	Barton Fink	Dennis Gassner	Nancy Haigh
1991 (64th)	The Fisher King	Mel Bourne	Cindy Carr
1991 (64th)	Hook	Norman Garwood	Garrett Lewis
1991 (64th)	The Prince of Tides	Paul Sylbert	Caryl Heller
1992 (65th)	Howards End	Luciana Arrighi	Ian Whittaker
1992 (65th)	Bram Stoker's Dracula	Thomas E. Sanders	Garrett Lewis
1992 (65th)	Chaplin	Stuart Craig	Chris A. Butler
1992 (65th)	Toys	Ferdinando Scarfiotti	Linda DeScenna
1992 (65th)	Unforgiven	Henry Bumstead	Janice Blackie-Goodine
1993 (66th)	Schindler's List	Allan Starski	Ewa Braun
1993 (66th)	Addams Family Values	Ken Adam	Marvin March
1993 (66th)	The Age of Innocence	Dante Ferretti	Robert J. Franco
1993 (66th)	Orlando	Ben Van Os and Jan Roelfs	—
1993 (66th)	The Remains of the Day	Luciana Arrighi	Ian Whittaker
1994 (67th)	The Madness of King George	Ken Adam	Carolyn Scott
1994 (67th)	Bullets Over Broadway	Santo Loquasto	Susan Bode
1994 (67th)	Forrest Gump	Rick Carter	Nancy Haigh
1994 (67th)	Interview with the Vampire	Dante Ferretti	Francesca Lo Schiavo
1994 (67th)	Legends of the Fall	Lilly Kilvert	Dorree Cooper
1995 (68th)	Restoration	Eugenio Zanetti	—
1995 (68th)	Apollo 13	Michael Corenblith	Merideth Boswell
1995 (68th)	Babe	Roger Ford	Kerrie Brown
1995 (68th)	A Little Princess	Bo Welch	Cheryl Carasik
1995 (68th)	Richard III	Tony Burrough	—
1996 (69th)	The English Patient	Stuart Craig	Stephenie McMillan
1996 (69th)	The Birdcage	Bo Welch	Cheryl Carasik
1996 (69th)	Evita	Brian Morris	Philippe Turlure
1996 (69th)	Hamlet	Tim Harvey	—
1996 (69th)	Romeo + Juliet	Catherine Martin	Brigitte Broch
1997 (70th)	Titanic	Peter Lamont	Michael D. Ford
1997 (70th)	Gattaca	Jan Roelfs	Nancy Nye
1997 (70th)	Kundun	Dante Ferretti	Francesca Lo Schiavo
1997 (70th)	L.A. Confidential	Jeannine Oppewall	Jay Hart
1997 (70th)	Men in Black	Bo Welch	Cheryl Carasik
1998 (71st)	Shakespeare in Love	Martin Childs	Jill Quertier
1998 (71st)	Elizabeth	John Myhre	Peter Howitt
1998 (71st)	Pleasantville	Jeannine Oppewall	Jay Hart
1998 (71st)	Saving Private Ryan	Tom Sanders	Lisa Dean Kavanaugh
1998 (71st)	What Dreams May Come	Eugenio Zanetti	Cindy Carr
1999 (72nd)	Sleepy Hollow	Rick Heinrichs	Peter Young
1999 (72nd)	Anna and the King	Luciana Arrighi	Ian Whittaker
1999 (72nd)	The Cider House Rules	David Gropman	Beth Rubino
1999 (72nd)	The Talented Mr. Ripley	Roy Walker	Bruno Cesari
1999 (72nd)	Topsy-Turvy	Eve Stewart	John Bush

=== 2000s ===
Year	Film	Art director(s)	Set decorator(s)
2000 (73rd)	Crouching Tiger, Hidden Dragon	Timmy Yip	—
2000 (73rd)	Gladiator	Arthur Max	Crispian Sallis
2000 (73rd)	How the Grinch Stole Christmas	Michael Corenblith	Merideth Boswell
2000 (73rd)	Quills	Martin Childs	Jill Quertier
2000 (73rd)	Vatel	Jean Rabasse	Françoise Benoît-Fresco
2001 (74th)	Moulin Rouge!	Catherine Martin	Brigitte Broch
2001 (74th)	Amélie	Aline Bonetto	Marie-Laure Valla
2001 (74th)	Gosford Park	Stephen Altman	Anna Pinnock
2001 (74th)	Harry Potter and the Sorcerer's Stone	Stuart Craig	Stephenie McMillan
2001 (74th)	The Lord of the Rings: The Fellowship of the Ring	Grant Major	Dan Hennah
2002 (75th)	Chicago	John Myhre	Gordon Sim
2002 (75th)	Frida	Felipe Fernández del Paso	Hania Robledo
2002 (75th)	Gangs of New York	Dante Ferretti	Francesca Lo Schiavo
2002 (75th)	The Lord of the Rings: The Two Towers	Grant Major	Dan Hennah and Alan Lee
2002 (75th)	Road to Perdition	Dennis Gassner	Nancy Haigh
2003 (76th)	The Lord of the Rings: The Return of the King	Grant Major	Dan Hennah and Alan Lee
2003 (76th)	Girl with a Pearl Earring	Ben Van Os	Cecile Heideman
2003 (76th)	The Last Samurai	Lilly Kilvert	Gretchen Rau
2003 (76th)	Master and Commander: The Far Side of the World	William Sandell	Robert Gould
2003 (76th)	Seabiscuit	Jeannine Oppewall	Leslie Pope
2004 (77th)	The Aviator	Dante Ferretti	Francesca Lo Schiavo
2004 (77th)	Finding Neverland	Gemma Jackson	Trisha Edwards
2004 (77th)	Lemony Snicket's A Series of Unfortunate Events	Rick Heinrichs	Cheryl Carasik
2004 (77th)	The Phantom of the Opera	Anthony Pratt	Celia Bobak
2004 (77th)	A Very Long Engagement	Aline Bonetto	—
2005 (78th)	Memoirs of a Geisha	John Myhre	Gretchen Rau
2005 (78th)	Good Night, and Good Luck	Jim Bissell	Jan Pascale
2005 (78th)	Harry Potter and the Goblet of Fire	Stuart Craig	Stephenie McMillan
2005 (78th)	King Kong	Grant Major	Dan Hennah and Simon Bright
2005 (78th)	Pride & Prejudice	Sarah Greenwood	Katie Spencer
2006 (79th)	Pan's Labyrinth	Eugenio Caballero	Pilar Revuelta
2006 (79th)	Dreamgirls	John Myhre	Nancy Haigh
2006 (79th)	The Good Shepherd	Jeannine Claudia Oppewall	Gretchen Rau and Leslie E. Rollins
2006 (79th)	Pirates of the Caribbean: Dead Man's Chest	Rick Heinrichs	Cheryl Carasik
2006 (79th)	The Prestige	Nathan Crowley	Julie Ochipinti
2007 (80th)	Sweeney Todd: The Demon Barber of Fleet Street	Dante Ferretti	Francesca Lo Schiavo
2007 (80th)	American Gangster	Arthur Max	Beth A. Rubino
2007 (80th)	Atonement	Sarah Greenwood	Katie Spencer
2007 (80th)	The Golden Compass	Dennis Gassner	Anna Pinnock
2007 (80th)	There Will Be Blood	Jack Fisk	Jim Erickson
2008 (81st)	The Curious Case of Benjamin Button	Donald Graham Burt	Victor J. Zolfo
2008 (81st)	Changeling	James J. Murakami	Gary Fettis
2008 (81st)	The Dark Knight	Nathan Crowley	Peter Lando
2008 (81st)	The Duchess	Michael Carlin	Rebecca Alleway
2008 (81st)	Revolutionary Road	Kristi Zea	Debra Schutt
2009 (82nd)	Avatar	Rick Carter and Robert Stromberg	Kim Sinclair
2009 (82nd)	The Imaginarium of Doctor Parnassus	Dave Warren and Anastasia Masaro	Caroline Smith
2009 (82nd)	Nine	John Myhre	Gordon Sim
2009 (82nd)	Sherlock Holmes	Sarah Greenwood	Katie Spencer
2009 (82nd)	The Young Victoria	Patrice Vermette	Maggie Gray

=== 2010s ===
Year	Film	Production designer(s)	Set decorator(s)
2010 (83rd)	Alice in Wonderland	Robert Stromberg	Karen O'Hara
2010 (83rd)	Harry Potter and the Deathly Hallows – Part 1	Stuart Craig	Stephenie McMillan
2010 (83rd)	Inception	Guy Hendrix Dyas	Larry Dias and Doug Mowat
2010 (83rd)	The King's Speech	Eve Stewart	Judy Farr
2010 (83rd)	True Grit	Jess Gonchor	Nancy Haigh
2011 (84th)	Hugo	Dante Ferretti	Francesca Lo Schiavo
2011 (84th)	The Artist	Laurence Bennett	Robert Gould
2011 (84th)	Harry Potter and the Deathly Hallows – Part 2	Stuart Craig	Stephenie McMillan
2011 (84th)	Midnight in Paris	Anne Seibel	Hélène Dubreuil
2011 (84th)	War Horse	Rick Carter	Lee Sandales
2012 (85th)	Lincoln	Rick Carter	Jim Erickson
2012 (85th)	Anna Karenina	Sarah Greenwood	Katie Spencer
2012 (85th)	The Hobbit: An Unexpected Journey	Dan Hennah	Ra Vincent and Simon Bright
2012 (85th)	Les Misérables	Eve Stewart	Anna Lynch-Robinson
2012 (85th)	Life of Pi	David Gropman	Anna Pinnock
2013 (86th)	The Great Gatsby	Catherine Martin	Beverley Dunn
2013 (86th)	American Hustle	Judy Becker	Heather Loeffler
2013 (86th)	Gravity	Andy Nicholson	Rosie Goodwin and Joanne Woollard
2013 (86th)	Her	K. K. Barrett	Gene Serdena
2013 (86th)	12 Years a Slave	Adam Stockhausen	Alice Baker
2014 (87th)	The Grand Budapest Hotel	Adam Stockhausen	Anna Pinnock
2014 (87th)	The Imitation Game	Maria Djurkovic	Tatiana Macdonald
2014 (87th)	Interstellar	Nathan Crowley	Gary Fettis
2014 (87th)	Into the Woods	Dennis Gassner	Anna Pinnock
2014 (87th)	Mr. Turner	Suzie Davies	Charlotte Watts
2015 (88th)	Mad Max: Fury Road	Colin Gibson	Lisa Thompson
2015 (88th)	Bridge of Spies	Adam Stockhausen	Rena DeAngelo and Bernhard Henrich
2015 (88th)	The Danish Girl	Eve Stewart	Michael Standish
2015 (88th)	The Martian	Arthur Max	Celia Bobak
2015 (88th)	The Revenant	Jack Fisk	Hamish Purdy
2016 (89th)	La La Land	David Wasco	Sandy Reynolds-Wasco
2016 (89th)	Arrival	Patrice Vermette	Paul Hotte
2016 (89th)	Fantastic Beasts and Where to Find Them	Stuart Craig	Anna Pinnock
2016 (89th)	Hail, Caesar!	Jess Gonchor	Nancy Haigh
2016 (89th)	Passengers	Guy Hendrix Dyas	Gene Serdena
2017 (90th)	The Shape of Water	Paul Denham Austerberry	Shane Vieau and Jeff Melvin
2017 (90th)	Beauty and the Beast	Sarah Greenwood	Katie Spencer
2017 (90th)	Blade Runner 2049	Dennis Gassner	Alessandra Querzola
2017 (90th)	Darkest Hour	Sarah Greenwood	Katie Spencer
2017 (90th)	Dunkirk	Nathan Crowley	Gary Fettis
2018 (91st)	Black Panther	Hannah Beachler	Jay Hart
2018 (91st)	The Favourite	Fiona Crombie	Alice Felton
2018 (91st)	First Man	Nathan Crowley	Kathy Lucas
2018 (91st)	Mary Poppins Returns	John Myhre	Gordon Sim
2018 (91st)	Roma	Eugenio Caballero	Bárbara Enrı́quez
2019 (92nd)	Once Upon a Time in Hollywood	Barbara Ling	Nancy Haigh
2019 (92nd)	The Irishman	Bob Shaw	Regina Graves
2019 (92nd)	Jojo Rabbit	Ra Vincent	Nora Sopková
2019 (92nd)	1917	Dennis Gassner	Lee Sandales
2019 (92nd)	Parasite	Lee Ha-jun	Cho Won-woo

=== 2020s ===
Year	Film	Production designer(s)	Set decorator(s)
2020 (93rd)	Mank	Donald Graham Burt	Jan Pascale
2020 (93rd)	The Father	Peter Francis	Cathy Featherstone
2020 (93rd)	Ma Rainey's Black Bottom	Mark Ricker	Karen O'Hara and Diana Stoughton
2020 (93rd)	News of the World	David Crank	Elizabeth Keenan
2020 (93rd)	Tenet	Nathan Crowley	Kathy Lucas
2021 (94th)	Dune	Patrice Vermette	Zsuzsanna Sipos
2021 (94th)	Nightmare Alley	Tamara Deverell	Shane Vieau
2021 (94th)	The Power of the Dog	Grant Major	Amber Richards
2021 (94th)	The Tragedy of Macbeth	Stefan Dechant	Nancy Haigh
2021 (94th)	West Side Story	Adam Stockhausen	Rena DeAngelo
2022 (95th)	All Quiet on the Western Front	Christian M. Goldbeck	Ernestine Hipper
2022 (95th)	Avatar: The Way of Water	Dylan Cole and Ben Procter	Vanessa Cole
2022 (95th)	Babylon	Florencia Martin	Anthony Carlino
2022 (95th)	Elvis	Catherine Martin and Karen Murphy	Bev Dunn
2022 (95th)	The Fabelmans	Rick Carter	Karen O'Hara
2023 (96th)	Poor Things	James Price and Shona Heath	Zsuzsa Mihalek
2023 (96th)	Barbie	Sarah Greenwood	Katie Spencer
2023 (96th)	Killers of the Flower Moon	Jack Fisk	Adam Willis
2023 (96th)	Napoleon	Arthur Max	Elli Griff
2023 (96th)	Oppenheimer	Ruth De Jong	Claire Kaufman
2024 (97th)	Wicked	Nathan Crowley	Lee Sandales
2024 (97th)	The Brutalist	Judy Becker	Patricia Cuccia
2024 (97th)	Conclave	Suzie Davies	Cynthia Sleiter
2024 (97th)	Dune: Part Two	Patrice Vermette	Shane Vieau
2024 (97th)	Nosferatu	Craig Lathrop	Beatrice Brentnerová
2025 (98th)	Frankenstein	Tamara Deverell	Shane Vieau
2025 (98th)	Hamnet	Fiona Crombie	Alice Felton
2025 (98th)	Marty Supreme	Jack Fisk	Adam Willis
2025 (98th)	One Battle After Another	Florencia Martin	Anthony Carlino
2025 (98th)	Sinners	Hannah Beachler	Monique Champagne

== Shortlisted finalists ==
Finalists for Best Production Design were selected by branch members, who voted for ten finalists which were screened to determine the five nominees.

Year	Finalists	Ref
1965	Black-and-White: Morituri, My Blood Runs Cold, Signpost to Murder, Sylvia, Woman in the Dunes; Color: Boeing Boeing, Harlow, The Sandpiper, Those Calloways, The War Lord	
1966	Black-and-White: The Idol, Seconds, The Shop on Main Street; Color: The Bible: In the Beginning..., Follow Me, Boys!, The Glass Bottom Boat, Hawaii, The Professionals	
1967	Barefoot in the Park, Bonnie and Clyde, The Flim-Flam Man, The Happiest Millionaire, In Like Flint	
1968	Funny Girl, The Killing of Sister George, Never a Dull Moment, The Odd Couple, Planet of the Apes	
1969	The April Fools, Marooned, The Secret of Santa Vittoria, Topaz, What Ever Happened to Aunt Alice?	
1970	Cromwell, Darling Lili, Fellini Satyricon, The Great White Hope, M*A*S*H	
1971	Carnal Knowledge, A Clockwork Orange, The French Connection, The Mephisto Waltz, Who Is Harry Kellerman and Why Is He Saying Those Terrible Things About Me?	
1972	Butterflies Are Free, The Life and Times of Judge Roy Bean, Slaughterhouse-Five, Snowball Express, The War Between Men and Women	
1973	40 Carats, Jesus Christ Superstar, Lost Horizon, Papillon, The World's Greatest Athlete	
1974	The Dion Brothers, The Front Page, The Great Gatsby, Mame, Young Frankenstein	
1975	At Long Last Love, Escape to Witch Mountain, Jaws, Sheila Levine Is Dead and Living in New York, Tommy	
1976	Freaky Friday, From Noon till Three, Harry and Walter Go to New York, King Kong, A Star Is Born	
1977	Looking for Mr. Goodbar, New York, New York, 1900, Pete's Dragon, Sorcerer	
1978	The Boys from Brazil, Foul Play, Gray Lady Down, Grease, House Calls	
1979	The Black Hole, Manhattan, Moonraker, 10, Winter Kills	

== Individuals with multiple wins ==
11 wins

- Cedric Gibbons

8 wins

- Edwin B. Willis

7 wins

- Richard Day

6 wins

- Thomas Little
- Walter M. Scott

5 wins

- Lyle R. Wheeler

4 wins

- John Box
- Samuel M. Comer
- F. Keogh Gleason
- George James Hopkins

3 wins

- Edward Carfagno
- Stuart Craig
- William S. Darling
- John DeCuir
- Vernon Dixon
- Hans Dreier
- Dante Ferretti
- Paul S. Fox
- Alexander Golitzen
- Paul Groesse
- John Meehan
- Ray Moyer
- Francesca Lo Schiavo
- Jack Martin Smith

2 wins

- Ken Adam
- E. Preston Ames
- Herman A. Blumenthal
- Henry Bumstead
- Donald Graham Burt
- Gene Callahan
- Rick Carter
- George Davis
- Leslie Dilley
- Michael D. Ford
- George Gaines
- Russell A. Gausman
- Nancy Haigh
- Harry Horner
- William A. Horning
- Hugh Hunt
- Wiard Ihnen
- Emile Kuri
- Terence Marsh
- Catherine Martin
- William Cameron Menzies
- Urie McCleary
- John Myhre
- Gil Parrondo
- Robert Priestley
- Stuart A. Reiss
- Norman Reynolds
- Dario Simoni
- Robert Stromberg
- Richard Sylbert
- Shane Vieau
- Joseph C. Wright
- Peter Young

== Individuals with multiple nominations ==
39 nominations

- Cedric Gibbons

32 nominations

- Edwin B. Willis

29 nominations

- Lyle R. Wheeler

26 nominations

- Samuel M. Comer

23 nominations

- Hans Dreier

21 nominations

- Thomas Little
- Walter M. Scott

20 nominations

- Richard Day

17 nominations

- George Davis

15 nominations

- Roland Anderson

14 nominations

- Alexander Golitzen

13 nominations

- Paul S. Fox
- Henry Grace
- George James Hopkins
- Hugh Hunt

12 nominations

- Ray Moyer
- Joseph C. Wright

11 nominations

- Stuart Craig
- John DeCuir
- Paul Groesse

10 nominations

- Edward Carfagno

9 nominations

- Howard Bristol
- Dante Ferretti
- Nancy Haigh
- Boris Leven
- Jack Martin Smith
- Walter H. Tyler

8 nominations

- E. Preston Ames
- William A. Horning
- Arthur Krams
- Emile Kuri
- Francesca Lo Schiavo
- Jack Otterson

7 nominations

- Lionel Banks
- Edward G. Boyle
- Carroll Clark
- Nathan Crowley
- William S. Darling
- Dennis Gassner
- Russell A. Gausman
- F. Keogh Gleason
- Sarah Greenwood
- Frank R. McKelvy
- Jack D. Moore
- Darrell Silvera
- Katie Spencer

6 nominations

- John Box
- Leland Fuller
- Ted Haworth
- William Kiernan
- Urie McCleary
- John Myhre
- Anna Pinnock
- Richard Pefferle
- Van Nest Polglase
- Stuart A. Reiss
- Norman Reynolds
- Richard Sylbert

5 nominations

- Ken Adam
- James Basevi
- Albert Brenner
- Cheryl Carasik
- Rick Carter
- Robert Clatworthy
- Albert S. D'Agostino
- Linda DeScenna
- Leslie Dilley
- Perry Ferguson
- Hal Gausman
- Stephen Goosson
- Anton Grot
- Dan Hennah
- Julia Heron
- Joseph Kish
- Tambi Larsen
- Grant Major
- Marvin March
- Stephenie McMillan
- Hans Peters
- Dean Tavoularis

4 nominations

- Robert R. Benton
- Robert F. Boyle
- Raphaël Bretton
- Henry Bumstead
- Gene Callahan
- Robert Cartwright
- Ernst Fegté
- Gary Fettis
- Jack Fisk
- Michael D. Ford
- George Gaines
- John B. Goodman
- Peter Howitt
- Angelo P. Graham
- Vincent Korda
- Peter Lamont
- Garrett Lewis
- Terence Marsh
- Catherine Martin
- Arthur Max
- George R. Nelson
- Karen O'Hara
- Jeannine Oppewall
- Dario Simoni
- Eve Stewart
- Adam Stockhausen
- Patrice Vermette
- Shane Vieau
- George C. Webb
- Bo Welch
- Ian Whittaker

3 nominations

- Gene Allen
- Luciana Arrighi
- Mel Bourne
- Patrizia von Brandenstein
- John Bryan
- W. Stewart Campbell
- Claude E. Carpenter
- Edward Carrere
- William J. Creber
- Vernon Dixon
- Randall Duell
- A. Roland Fields
- Norman Garwood
- Piero Gherardi
- Stephen B. Grimes
- Jay Hart
- Rick Heinrichs
- Dale Hennesy
- Harry Horner
- John Hughes
- Wiard Ihnen
- Mark-Lee Kirk
- Ruby R. Levitt
- Santo Loquasto
- Josie MacAvin
- John Victor Mackay
- Fred M. MacLean
- Joseph McMillan Johnson
- John Meehan
- William Cameron Menzies
- George Milo
- Yoshirō Muraki
- Cary Odell
- Gil Parrondo
- James W. Payne
- Robert Priestley
- Gianni Quaranta
- Maurice Ransford
- Gretchen Rau
- Casey Roberts
- Crispian Sallis
- Lee Sandales
- Hugh Scaife
- Elliot Scott
- Gordon Sim
- Rudolph Sternad
- Alexander Toluboff
- Frank Tuttle
- Robert Usher
- Roy Walker
- Ira S. Webb

2 nominations

- Carl Anderson
- Ernest Archer
- Fay Babcock
- Hannah Beachler
- Judy Becker
- Malcolm C. Bert
- Carl Biddiscombe
- Celia Bobak
- Aline Bonetto
- Merideth Boswell
- Simon Bright
- Brigitte Broch
- Malcolm Brown
- Donald Graham Burt
- Eugenio Caballero
- Anthony Carlino
- Cindy Carr
- Maurice Carter
- Daniel B. Cathcart
- Bruno Cesari
- Roger Christian
- Harry Cordwell
- Michael Corenblith
- Lionel Couch
- Fiona Crombie
- Suzie Davies
- Lisa Dean
- Rena DeAngelo
- George DeTitta Jr.
- Robert De Vestel
- Tamara Deverell
- Carmen Dillon
- Ross Dowd
- Raoul Pene Du Bois
- Beverley Dunn
- Guy Hendrix Dyas
- Peter Ellenshaw
- Jim Erickson
- Alice Felton
- William Ferrari
- Victor A. Gangelin
- Jess Gonchor
- Robert Gould
- Bertram C. Granger
- Maggie Gray
- John Graysmark
- Grace Gregory
- David Gropman
- Pierre Guffroy
- Robert M. Haas
- David S. Hall
- Hein Heckroth
- Addison Hehr
- Walter Holscher
- Fredric Hope
- Frank E. Hughes
- Peter James
- George C. Jenkins
- Carol Joffe
- Alfred Junge
- Nathan Juran
- William Kellner
- Lilly Kilvert
- Robert W. Laing
- Harry Lange
- Alan Lee
- Kathy Lucas
- John B. Mansbridge
- Ted Marshall
- Florencia Martin
- So Matsuyama
- John McCarthy Jr.
- Jack McConaghy
- Patrick McLoughlin
- Mickey S. Michaels
- Harold Michelson
- Lorenzo Mongiardino
- Martin Obzina
- Jack Okey
- Harry Oliver
- Ben Van Os
- Arthur Jeph Parker
- Jan Pascale
- Anthony D. G. Pratt
- Jill Quertier
- Norman Rockett
- Jan Roelfs
- Philip Rosenberg
- Beth Rubino
- Thomas E. Sanders
- George Sawley
- Ferdinando Scarfiotti
- John DuCasse Schulze
- Michael Seirton
- Gene Serdena
- Paul Sheriff
- Rick Simpson
- Ted Smith
- Jack Stephens
- Edward Stewart
- Robert Stromberg
- Paul Sylbert
- Charles S. Thompson
- Alexandre Trauner
- William H. Tuntke
- Tony Walton
- Elven Webb
- Carl Jules Weyl
- Adam Willis
- Joanne Woollard
- Jerry Wunderlich
- Peter Young
- Eugenio Zanetti

== See also ==
- BAFTA Award for Best Production Design
- Critics' Choice Movie Award for Best Production Design
- ADG Excellence in Production Design Awards
- List of Academy Award–nominated films
