= Frederick Hope =

Frederick Hope may refer to:

- Fredric Hope (1900–1937), American art director
- Frederick William Hope (1797–1862), English entomologist
