= Gangelin =

Gangelin is a surname. Notable people with the surname include:

- Paul Gangelin (1898–1961), American screenwriter
- Victor A. Gangelin (1899–1967), American feature film and television set decorator
