= Robert Clatworthy =

Robert Clatworthy may refer to:

- Robert Clatworthy (art director) (1911–1992), American art director
- Robert Clatworthy (sculptor) (1928–2015), British sculptor
