= Fred MacLean =

Fred MacLean may refer to:

- Fred M. MacLean (1898–1976), American set decorator
- Fred MacLean (Manitoba politician)
