= Darrell Silvera =

American set decorator

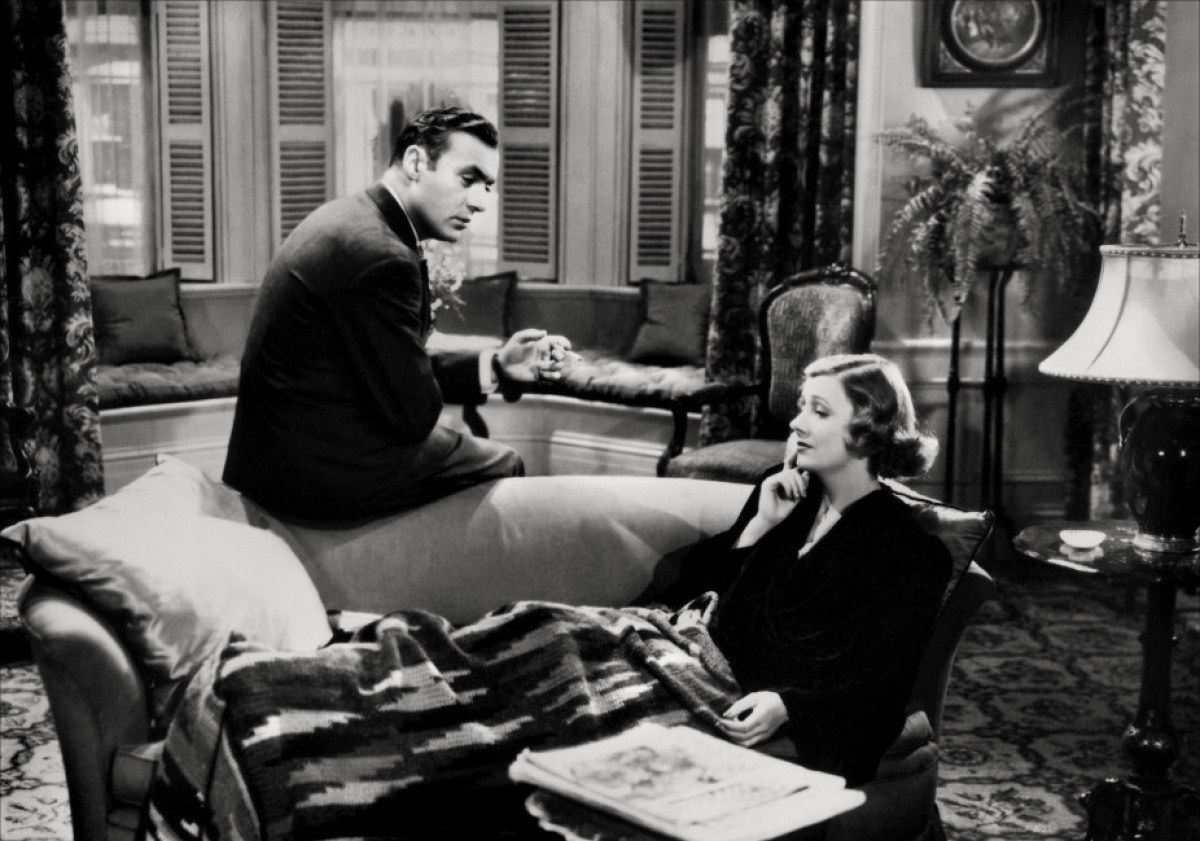
- Born: December 18, 1900
- Died: July 22, 1983 (aged 82); San Diego, California
- Occupation: Set decorator
- Years active: 1934-1978

Darrell Silvera (December 18, 1900 – July 22, 1983) was an American set decorator. He was nominated for seven Academy Awards in the category Best Art Direction. He worked on 356 films between 1934 and 1978.

== Selected filmography ==
Silvera was nominated for seven Academy Awards for Best Art Direction:

- Citizen Kane (1941)
- The Devil and Daniel Webster (1941)
- The Magnificent Ambersons (1942)
- Flight for Freedom (1943)
- Step Lively (1944)
- Experiment Perilous (1944)
- The Man with the Golden Arm (1955)
- The Molly Maguires (1970)
