= William Kiernan =

Set decorator

- Born: April 2, 1908; New York City, New York
- Died: November 19, 1973 (aged 65); Los Angeles, California
- Occupation: Set decorator
- Years active: 1943-1973

William Kiernan (April 2, 1908 – November 19, 1973) was an American set decorator. He was nominated for six Academy Awards in the category Best Art Direction.

== Selected filmography ==
Kiernan was nominated for six Academy Awards for Best Art Direction:

- The Solid Gold Cadillac (1956)
- Pal Joey (1957)
- The Last Angry Man (1959)
- Pepe (1960)
- The Sand Pebbles (1966)
- The Way We Were (1973)
