= Richard Pefferle =

Richard A. Pefferle
- Born: January 5, 1905; Sidney, Ohio
- Died: March 7, 1969 (aged 64); Los Angeles, California
- Occupation: Set decorator
- Years active: 1942-1969

Richard Pefferle (January 5, 1905 – March 7, 1969) was an American set decorator. He was nominated for six Academy Awards in the category Best Art Direction.

== Selected filmography ==
Pefferle was nominated for six Academy Awards for Best Art Direction:

- Kismet (1944)
- Madame Bovary (1949)
- Annie Get Your Gun (1950)
- Les Girls (1957)
- The Wonderful World of the Brothers Grimm (1962)
- Period of Adjustment (1962)
