= Robert Priestley =

Set decorator

- Born: June 12, 1901; Manhattan, New York
- Died: November 27, 1986 (aged 85); San Diego, California
- Occupation: Set decorator
- Years active: 1942–1968

Robert Priestley (June 12, 1901 – November 27, 1986) was an American set decorator. He won two Academy Awards and was nominated for another in the category Best Art Direction.

== Selected filmography ==
Priestley won two Academy Awards for Best Art Direction and was nominated for another:

Won

- Picnic (1955)
- Sayonara (1957)

Nominated

- Marty (1955)
