= Lionel Couch =

British art director (1913–1989)

- Born: 1913
- Died: 1989 (aged 75–76)
- Occupation: Art director
- Years active: 1947-1980

Lionel Couch (1913–1989) was a British art director. He was nominated for two Academy Awards in the category Best Art Direction.

== Selected filmography ==
Couch was nominated for two Academy Awards for Best Art Direction:

- Sons and Lovers (1960)
- Anne of the Thousand Days (1969)
