= Albert S. D'Agostino =

American art director (1892–1970)

- Born: December 27, 1892; New York City, New York, U.S.
- Died: March 14, 1970 (aged 77); Los Angeles, California, U.S.
- Occupation: Art director
- Years active: 1921-1959

Albert S. D'Agostino (December 27, 1892 – March 14, 1970) was an American art director. He was nominated for five Academy Awards in the category Best Art Direction. He worked on 339 films between 1921 and 1959. He was born in New York City, New York, and died in Los Angeles, California.

== Selected filmography ==
- Princess O'Hara (1935)

D'Agostino was nominated for five Academy Awards for Best Art Direction:

- The Magnificent Brute (1936)
- The Magnificent Ambersons (1942)
- Flight for Freedom (1943)
- Step Lively (1944)
- Experiment Perilous (1944)
