= Hugh Scaife =

British set decorator (1930–2009)

- Born: 12 April 1930; Headley, Hampshire, England
- Died: 25 June 2009 (aged 79); Wilmington, North Carolina, United States
- Occupation: Set decorator
- Years active: 1970 - 1991

Hugh Scaife (12 April 1930 – 25 June 2009) was a British set decorator. He was nominated for three Academy Awards in the category Best Art Direction.

== Selected filmography ==
Scaife was nominated for three Academy Awards for Best Art Direction:

- The Spy Who Loved Me (1977)
- The Elephant Man (1980)
- A Passage to India (1984)
