= Jack McConaghy =

American set decorator

- Born: December 21, 1902; Pennsylvania, USA
- Died: October 13, 1977 (aged 74); San Diego, California, USA
- Occupation: Set decorator
- Years active: 1943-1964

Jack McConaghy (December 21, 1902 – October 13, 1977) was an American set decorator. He was nominated for two Academy Awards in the category Best Art Direction.

== Selected filmography ==
McConaghy was nominated for two Academy Awards for Best Art Direction:

- The Desert Song (1943)
- San Antonio (1945)
