= Maggie Gray =

- Occupation: Set decorator
- Years active: 1969–2009

Maggie Gray is an English set decorator. She was nominated for an Academy Award in the category Best Art Direction for the film Brazil and again in 2010 for her work in The Young Victoria. In addition, she won an Emmy Award for The Young Indiana Jones Chronicles.

== Selected filmography ==
- Brazil (1985)
- The Young Victoria (2009)
