= Joseph Kish =

American set decorator (1899–1969)

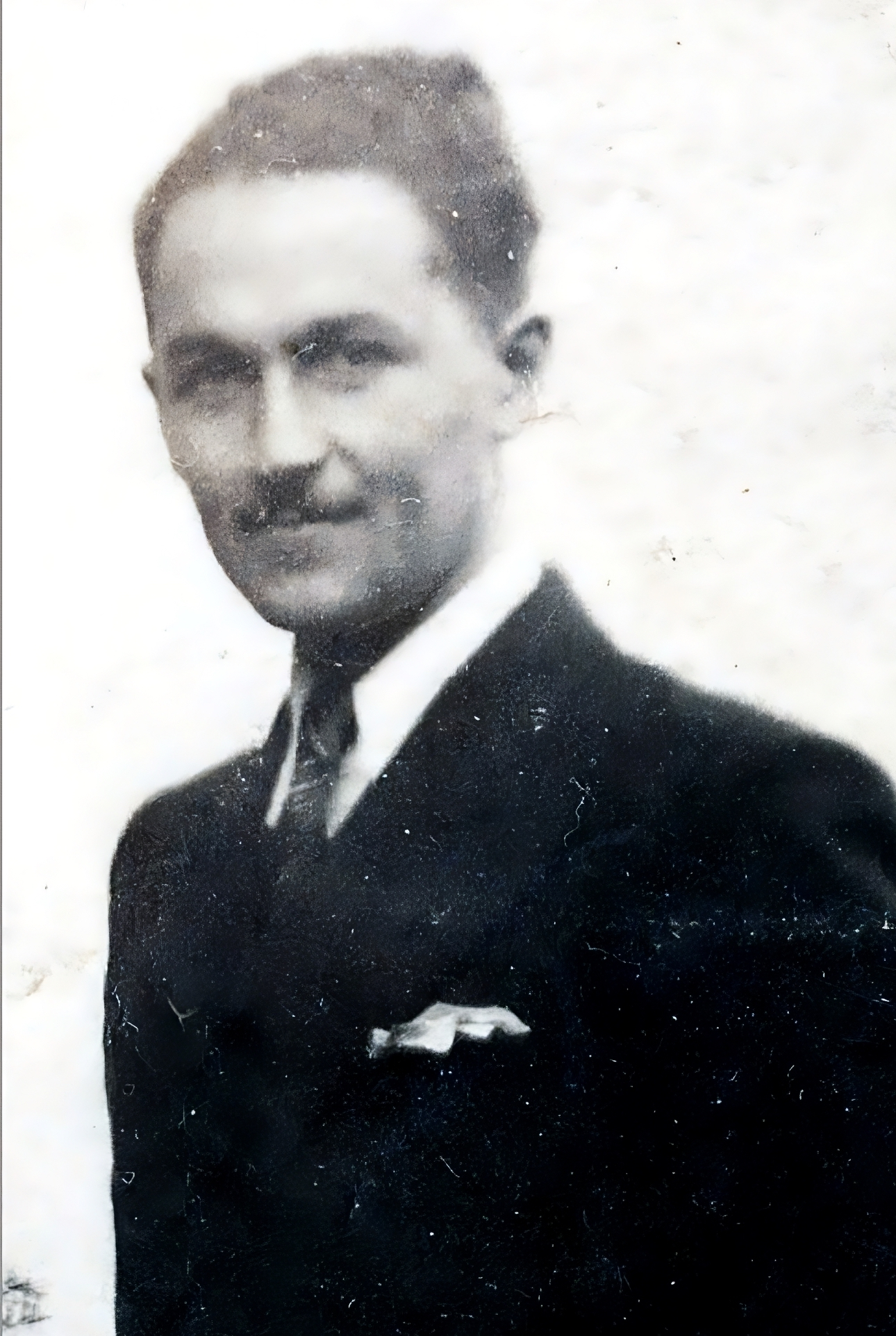
- Joseph Kish during a visit to his hometown Sombor in 1930s.
- Born: June 14, 1899; Sombor, Austria-Hungary
- Died: March 14, 1969 (aged 69); Hollywood, California
- Occupation: Set decorator
- Years active: 1942-1966

Joseph Kish (June 14, 1899 – March 14, 1969) was an American set decorator. He won an Academy Award for Best Art Direction for the film Ship of Fools and was nominated for four more in the category Best Art Direction. He worked on 130 films between 1942 and 1966.

== Selected filmography ==
Kish won an Academy Award for Best Art Direction and was nominated for four more:

Won

- Ship of Fools (1965)

Nominated

- Address Unknown (1944)
- Joan of Arc (1948)
- Journey to the Center of the Earth (1959)
- The Slender Thread (1965)
