= Julia Heron =

American art director

- Born: November 21, 1897; Montana
- Died: April 9, 1977 (aged 79); Los Angeles, California
- Occupation: Set decorator
- Years active: 1930-1968

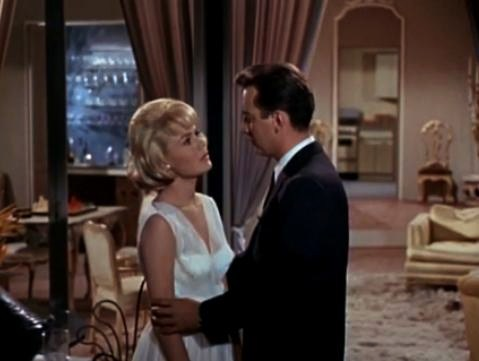
That Funny Feeling (1965) trailer 1.jpg

Julia Heron (November 21, 1897 – April 9, 1977) was an American set decorator. She won an Academy Award and was nominated for four more in the category Best Art Direction. She worked on more than 100 films between 1930 and 1968.

== Selected filmography ==
Heron won an Academy Award for Best Art Direction and was nominated for four more:

Won

- Spartacus (1960)

Nominated

- The Big Fisherman (1959)
- Casanova Brown (1944)
- Jungle Book (1942)
- That Hamilton Woman (1941)
