= Marvin March =

American set decorator (1930–2022)

- Born: May 8, 1930
- Died: October 28, 2022 (aged 92)
- Occupation: Set decorator
- Years active: 1964–1999

Marvin March (May 8, 1930 – October 28, 2022) was an American set decorator. He has been nominated for five Academy Awards in the category Best Art Direction. March died on October 28, 2022.

== Selected filmography ==
March has been nominated for five Academy Awards for Best Art Direction:

- The Sunshine Boys (1975)
- The Turning Point (1977)
- California Suite (1978)
- Annie (1982)
- Addams Family Values (1993)
