= Ted Smith (art director) =

American art director

- Born: Edward Jenkins Smith; June 14, 1886; Pennsylvania, U.S.
- Died: June 19, 1949 (aged 63); Los Angeles, California, U.S.
- Occupation: Art director
- Years active: 1936-1949

Ted Smith (June 14, 1886 – June 19, 1949) was an American art director. He was nominated for two Academy Awards in the category Best Art Direction.

== Selected filmography ==
Smith was nominated for two Academy Awards for Best Art Direction:

- Captains of the Clouds (1942)
- San Antonio (1945)
