= Cheryl Carasik =

Set decorator

- Born: 1952 (age 73–74)
- Occupation: Set decorator
- Years active: 1985–present

Cheryl Carasik (born 1952) is a set decorator. She has been nominated for five Academy Awards in the category Best Art Direction.

== Selected filmography ==
- Edward Scissorhands (1990)
- A Little Princess (1995)
- The Birdcage (1996)
- Men in Black (1997)
- The Hulk (2003)
- Lemony Snicket's A Series of Unfortunate Events (2004)
- Pirates of the Caribbean: Dead Man's Chest (2006)
- Pirates of the Caribbean: At World's End (2007)
- State of Play (2009)
- Winnie the Pooh (2011)
- Larry Crowne (2011)
- Abraham Lincoln: Vampire Hunter (2012)
- The Lone Ranger (2013)
- The Judge (2014)
