= Lilly Kilvert =

American production designer

- Born: Elizabeth Kilvert; 1950 (age 75–76); Providence, Rhode Island, United States
- Occupation: Production designer
- Years active: 1977-present

Lilly Kilvert (born 1950) is an American production designer. She has been nominated for two Academy Awards in the category Best Art Direction.

== Selected filmography ==
• To Live and Die in LA (1985)

- Legends of the Fall (1994)
- The Last Samurai (2003)
