= David S. Hall (art director) =

British art director

- Born: 23 July 1905; Northern Ireland
- Died: 23 July 1964 (aged 59)
- Other name: David Samuel Hall
- Occupation: Art director
- Years active: 1928–1965 (last credit after his death)

David S. Hall (23 July 1905 – 23 July 1964) was a British art director. He was nominated for two Academy Awards in the category Best Art Direction.

== Selected filmography ==
Hall was nominated for two Academy Awards for Best Art Direction:

- Wee Willie Winkie (1937)
- The Greatest Story Ever Told (1965)
