= George Milo =

American set decorator

- Born: December 19, 1909; New York, USA
- Died: August 19, 1984 (aged 74); Los Angeles, California, USA
- Occupation: Set decorator
- Years active: 1944-1976

George Milo (December 12, 1909 – August 19, 1984) was an American set decorator. He was nominated for three Academy Awards in the category Best Art Direction.

== Selected filmography ==
Milo was nominated for three Academy Awards for Best Art Direction:

- Psycho (1960)
- Judgment at Nuremberg (1961)
- That Touch of Mink (1962)
