= Philip Rosenberg =

American production designer

- Born: January 15, 1935 (age 91); Brooklyn, New York, U.S.
- Occupations: Production designer Art director
- Years active: 1968–2002

Philip Rosenberg (born January 15, 1935) is an American production designer and art director. He has won an Academy Award and was nominated for another in the category Best Art Direction.

== Selected filmography ==
Rosenberg has won an Academy Award for Best Art Direction and has been nominated for another:

Won

- All That Jazz (1979)

Nominated

- The Wiz (1978)
