= Addison Hehr =

American art director (1909–1971)

- Born: October 27, 1909; Cleveland, Ohio
- Died: February 28, 1971 (aged 61); Canoga Park, California
- Occupation: Art director
- Years active: 1951–1971

Addison Hehr (October 27, 1909 – February 28, 1971) was an American art director. He was nominated for two Academy Awards in the category Best Art Direction.

== Selected filmography ==
- The Day the Earth Stood Still (1951)
- The True Story of Jesse James (1957)
- Cimarron (1960)
- How the West Was Won (1962)
- The Scorpio Letters (1967)
