= Peter Young (set decorator) =

British set decorator (died 2025)

- Died: October 2025
- Occupation: Set decorator
- Years active: 1968–2025

Peter Young (died October 2025) was a British set decorator. He won two Academy Awards in the category Best Art Direction for the films Batman and Sleepy Hollow. In 1979, Young was the set decorator for the film Out of the Blue which was released in 1980 and directed by Dennis Hopper. He died in October 2025.

== Selected filmography ==
- Out of the Blue (1980)
- Batman (1989)
- Sleepy Hollow (1999)
