= Lisa Dean =

American set decorator

- Occupation: Set decorator
- Years active: 1986-1998

Lisa Dean is an American set decorator. She was nominated for two Academy Awards in the category Best Art Direction.

== Selected filmography ==
- Dances with Wolves (1990)
- Saving Private Ryan (1998)
