= John Victor Mackay =

American art director

- Born: July 13, 1891
- Died: September 8, 1945 (aged 54); Los Angeles, California
- Occupation: Art director
- Years active: 1937–1943

John Victor Mackay (July 13, 1891 – September 8, 1945) was an American art director. He was nominated for three Academy Awards in the category Best Art Direction. He worked on 97 films between 1937 and 1943.

== Selected filmography ==
Mackay was nominated for three Academy Awards for Best Art Direction:

- Manhattan Merry-Go-Round (1937)
- Man of Conquest (1939)
- Dark Command (1940)
