= Edward Stewart (set decorator) =

Set decorator

- Born: January 20, 1915
- Died: August 30, 1999 (aged 84)
- Occupation: Set decorator
- Years active: 1971–1982

Edward Stewart (January 20, 1915 – August 30, 1999) was an American set decorator. He won an Academy Award and was nominated for another in the category Best Art Direction.

== Selected filmography ==
Stewart won an Academy Award for Best Art Direction and was nominated for another:

Won

- All That Jazz (1979)

Nominated

- The Wiz (1978)
