= Dario Simoni =

American set decorator

- Born: 1901
- Died: May 23, 1984 (aged 82–83)
- Occupation: Set decorator
- Years active: 1949-1974

Dario Simoni (1901 – May 23, 1984) was a set decorator. He won two Academy Awards and was nominated for another two in the category Best Art Direction.

== Selected filmography ==
Simoni won two Academy Awards for Best Art Direction, both in David Lean films, and was nominated for another two:

Won

- Lawrence of Arabia (1962)
- Doctor Zhivago (1965)

Nominated

- The Agony and the Ecstasy (1965)
- The Taming of the Shrew (1967)
