= E. Preston Ames =

Hollywood art director

- Born: Edgar Preston Ames; June 15, 1906; San Mateo, California, USA
- Died: July 20, 1983 (aged 77); Los Angeles, California, USA
- Occupation: art director
- Years active: 1939-1983

Edgar Preston Ames (June 15, 1906 – July 20, 1983) was an American art director.

== Career ==
Ames first made inroads into Hollywood when he was a draftsman working on The Wizard of Oz in 1939. Within five years he had become a fully fledged art director.

In a career spanning nearly 40 years, Ames won 2 Oscars (for An American in Paris in 1951, award received with Cedric Gibbons, Edwin B. Willis, and Keogh Gleason, and Gigi in 1958) and was nominated an additional six times.

Among the highlights of his career were creating the mystical town of Brigadoon in 1954, recreating the Titanic in The Unsinkable Molly Brown in 1964, mocking up an airport for the film of the same name in 1970 and reducing Los Angeles to rubble in Earthquake in 1974.
