= Raphaël Bretton =

Set decorator

- Born: Raphaël Gaston Beugnon; 7 February 1920; Paris, France
- Died: 20 February 2011 (aged 91); Green Valley, Arizona
- Occupation: Set decorator
- Years active: 1946-1982

Raphaël Bretton (7 February 1920 – 20 February 2011) was a French set decorator. He won an Oscar and was nominated for three more in the category Best Art Direction.

== Biography ==
He was born Raphaël Gaston Beugnon in Paris, France. During World War II he fled to England, and in 1943 was recruited into the Special Operations Executive (SOE). His evaluations during training where not promising. His instructors considered him "soft", "petulant" and "prone to bouts of childish temper". He was eventually transferred to the American Office of Strategic Services (OSS) and commissioned into the United States Naval Reserve with the rank of lieutenant. In April 1944, Beugnon and two other agents were parachuted into northern France. Their mission, codenamed "Beggar", recruited more than 90 agents to operate in the Oise department, north-west of Paris. Prior to the D-Day landings they carried out sabotage attacks on German railway traffic and communications lines. Later, as Allied troops approached Paris, they discovered a large force of German tanks hidden in woodlands and called in air strikes to destroy them. Beugnon was subsequently awarded the French Croix de Guerre and the American Distinguished Service Cross. His citation read in part:

He displayed much ingenuity and daring, as when, on one occasion, he recovered an unexploded aerial bomb, transported it to a bridge, and used the explosive for partially demolishing that target. Beugnon's intrepid actions, personal bravery and zealous devotion to duty exemplify the highest traditions of the military forces of the United States.

Post-war he was sent to Hollywood to act as a technical advisor to the makers of the film O.S.S., starring Alan Ladd. He decided to stay in the United States, adopted the name Raphael Bretton, and worked as a set designer in films and television.

Bretton died in Green Valley, Arizona, on 20 February 2011.

== Selected filmography ==
Bretton won an Academy Award for Best Art Direction and was nominated for three more:

Won

- Hello, Dolly! (1969)

Nominated

- Hush...Hush, Sweet Charlotte (1964)
- The Poseidon Adventure (1972)
- The Towering Inferno (1974)
