= George C. Webb =

American art director and set designer

- Occupation: Art director
- Years active: 1934 - 1977

George C. Webb was an American art director and set designer. He was active from 1934 to his retirement in 1977. He fought in North Africa in World War II. He was nominated for four Academy Awards in the category Best Art Direction. His wife, Doreen, was an assistant costume designer in some films.

== Selected filmography ==
Webb was nominated for four Academy Awards for Best Art Direction:

- Gambit (1966)
- Thoroughly Modern Millie (1967)
- Sweet Charity (1969)
- Airport '77 (1977)
