= William Ferrari =

American art director

- Born: April 21, 1901
- Died: September 10, 1962 (aged 61)
- Occupation: Art director
- Years active: 1942-1962

William Ferrari (April 21, 1901 – September 10, 1962) was an American art director. He won an Oscar and was nominated for another in the category Best Art Direction. He died in 1962 and was buried at the Forest Lawn, Hollywood Hills Cemetery in Los Angeles

== Selected filmography ==
Ferrari won an Academy Awards for Best Art Direction and was nominated for another:

Won

- Gaslight (1944)

Nominated

- How the West Was Won (1962)
