= John Meehan (art director) =

American art director (1902–1963)

John Meehan (June 13, 1902 – May 15, 1963) was an American art director and production designer.

He was born in Tehachapi, California and attended the University of Southern California. Meehan won three Academy Awards for his art direction: William Wyler's The Heiress (1949), Billy Wilder's Sunset Boulevard (1950) and Richard Fleischer's 1954 adaptation of the Jules Verne classic for Walt Disney, 20,000 Leagues Under the Sea. He also worked on

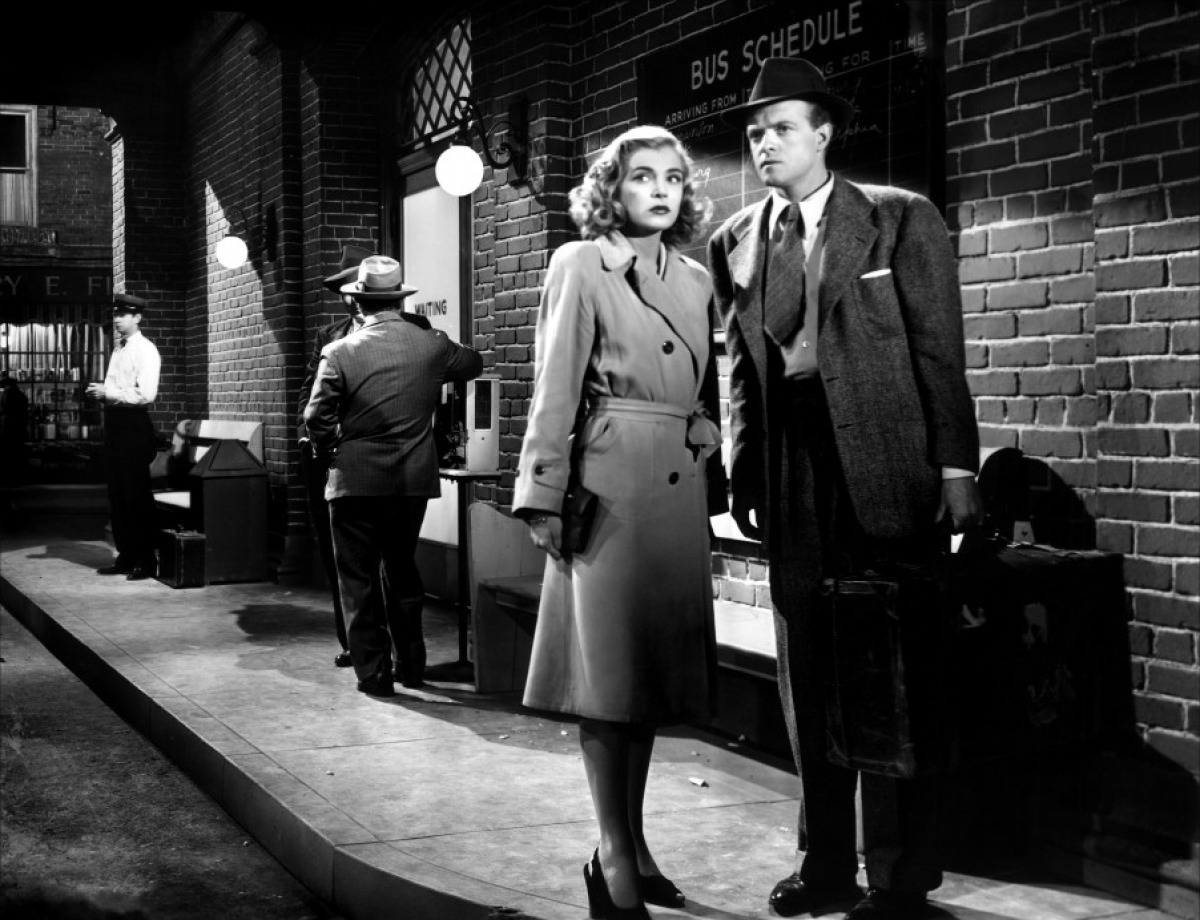
A screenshot of Lizabeth Scott and Van Heflin in the film The Strange Love of Martha Ivers (1946)

The Strange Love of Martha Ivers (1946), Golden Earrings (1947), Samson and Delilah (1949), Salome (1953) and It Should Happen to You (1956).

== See also ==
- Art Directors Guild Hall of Fame
