= Harry Lange =

German production designer (1930–2008)

Harry Hans-Kurt Lange (December 7, 1930 – May 22, 2008) was a German film production designer and art director.

Lange was born in 1930 in Eisenach, Thuringia. When Thuringia became part of Soviet-controlled East Germany after World War II, Lange went across the border to West Germany, where he studied art before moving to the United States in 1951. Upon arriving in the United States, Lange worked in advertising. During the Korean War, Lange worked for the U.S. military, illustrating flying manuals.

Subsequently, he began working at the Army Ballistic Missile Agency and then headed the future projects section at NASA, working on spacecraft designs alongside Wernher von Braun. Whilst at NASA, Lange met the author Arthur C. Clarke, who introduced him to the film director Stanley Kubrick. Kubrick offered Lange a job at his production company, using his astronautical design experience to produce authentic prop and set designs for a project Kubrick and Clarke were working on entitled Journey to the Stars. The project was renamed as 2001: A Space Odyssey (released in 1968), and the film's design team, including Lange, were nominated for the Academy Award for Best Art Direction. Although 2001 lost to Oliver!, Lange and his team did win the BAFTA Award for Best Production Design in that year.

Although best known for 2001, Lange worked on a number of well-known films during his career. He was art director for the James Bond film Moonraker, and an astronautical consultant on Superman II. He worked on the three first Star Wars films, as an art director and set decorator for The Empire Strikes Back (for which he was again nominated for the Art Direction Oscar) and Return of the Jedi respectively; he also worked on the original Star Wars, although his work was uncredited. He worked as a production designer on two films for the Jim Henson Company: The Great Muppet Caper (1981) and The Dark Crystal (1982). He was also production designer for the last Monty Python film Monty Python's The Meaning of Life.
