= Paul Sheriff =

British art director (1903–1960)

- Born: 13 November 1903; Moscow, Russia
- Died: 25 September 1960 (aged 56)
- Occupation: Art director
- Years active: 1940-1960

Paul Sheriff (13 November 1903 – 25 September 1960) was a Russian-born British art director. In early life he used the names Paul Schouvaloff, or Paul Shouvalov. He won an Academy Award and was nominated for another in the category Best Art Direction.

== Selected filmography ==
- The Divorce of Lady X (1938)
- French Without Tears (1940)
- Freedom Radio (1941)
- Henry V (1944)
- Moulin Rouge (1952)
- Three Cases of Murder (1955)
- Interpol (1957)

== Awards and nominations ==
Sheriff won an Academy Award for Best Art Direction and was nominated for another:

=== Won ===
- Moulin Rouge (1952)

=== Nominated ===
- Henry V (1944)
