= Frank Tuttle (set decorator) =

American set decorator (1905–1969)

- Born: November 15, 1905
- Died: August 6, 1969 (aged 63); Glendale, California, U.S.
- Occupation: Set decorator
- Years active: 1940–1969

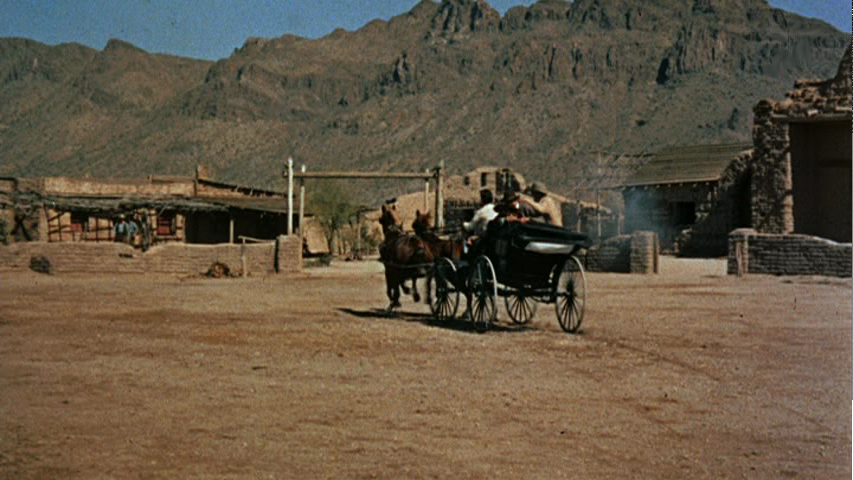
Barouche in Buchanan Rides Alone.png

Frank Tuttle (November 15, 1905 – August 6, 1969) was an American set decorator. He was nominated for three Academy Awards in the category Best Art Direction.

== Selected filmography ==
Tuttle was nominated for three Academy Awards for Best Art Direction:

- A Thousand and One Nights (1945)
- King Rat (1965)
- Guess Who's Coming to Dinner (1967)
