= Urie McCleary =

American art director

- Born: July 10, 1905; Arkansas
- Died: December 12, 1980 (aged 75); Los Angeles, California
- Occupation: Art director
- Years active: 1929-1970

Urie McCleary (July 10, 1905 – December 12, 1980) was an American art director. He won two Academy Awards and was nominated for four more in the category Best Art Direction. He was born in Arkansas and died in Los Angeles, California.

== Selected filmography ==
McCleary won two Academy Awards and was nominated for four more for Best Art Direction:

Won

- Blossoms in the Dust (1941)
- Patton (1970)

Nominated

- National Velvet (1944)
- Young Bess (1953)
- Raintree County (1957)
- A Patch of Blue (1965)
