= John DuCasse Schulze =

American art director

- Born: April 23, 1876; Illinois
- Died: June 17, 1943 (aged 67); Hollywood, California
- Occupation: Art director
- Years active: 1921-1942

John DuCasse Schulze (April 23, 1876 – June 17, 1943) was an American art director. He was nominated for two Academy Awards in the category Best Art Direction. He worked on 32 films between 1921 and 1942. He was born in Illinois and died in Hollywood, California.

== Selected filmography ==
Schulze was nominated for two Academy Awards for Best Art Direction:

- The Son of Monte Cristo (1940)
- My Son, My Son! (1940)
