= Walter Holscher =

American art director

- Born: January 23, 1901
- Died: August 7, 1973 (aged 72); Los Angeles, California
- Occupation: Art director
- Years active: 1942-1965

Walter Holscher (January 23, 1901 – August 7, 1973) was a German-born American art director. He was nominated for two Academy Awards in the category Best Art Direction.

== Selected filmography ==
- Louisiana Hayride (1944)
- Rough, Tough and Ready (1945)
- The Woman from Tangier (1948)
- Thunderhoof (1948)
- The Wild One (1953)
- Reprisal! (1956)

== Awards ==
Holscher was nominated for two Academy Awards for Best Art Direction:

- Address Unknown (1944)
- Pal Joey (1957)
