= Malcolm Brown (art director) =

American art director (1903–1967)

- Born: August 10, 1903
- Died: August 29, 1967 (aged 64); Los Angeles, California
- Occupation: Art director
- Years active: 1938–1966

Malcolm Brown (August 10, 1903 – August 29, 1967) was an American art director. He won an Oscar and was nominated for another in the category Best Art Direction.

== Selected filmography ==
Brown won an Academy Awards for Best Art Direction and was nominated for another:

Won

- Somebody Up There Likes Me (1956)

Nominated

- I'll Cry Tomorrow (1955)
