= Michael Seirton =

British set decorator (1937–2025)

- Born: Michael Brian Seirton; 1 November 1937; Derby, England
- Died: 21 February 2025 (aged 87); England
- Occupation: Set decorator
- Years active: 1978–2004

Michael Brian Seirton (1 November 1937 – 21 February 2025) was a British set decorator. He won an Academy Award and was nominated for another in the category Best Art Direction. Seirton won as Oscar for the set for Gandhi. He worked on more than 30 films. Seirton died on 21 February 2025, at the age of 87.

== Selected filmography ==
Seirton won an Academy Award for Best Art Direction and was nominated for another:

Won

- Gandhi (1982)

Nominated

- Reds (1981)
