= Elven Webb =

British art director

- Born: 29 August 1910; England
- Died: September 1979 (aged 69); London, England
- Occupation: Art director
- Years active: 1944 - 1970

Elven Webb (29 August 1910 – September 1979) was a British art director. He won an Academy Award and was nominated for another in the category Best Art Direction.

== Selected filmography ==
Webb won an Academy Award for Best Art Direction and was nominated for another:

Won

- Cleopatra (1963)

Nominated

- The Taming of the Shrew (1967)
