= William J. Creber =

American art director (1931–2019)

- Born: William John Creber; July 26, 1931; Los Angeles, California, U.S.
- Died: March 7, 2019 (aged 87); Los Angeles, California, U.S.
- Occupation: Art director
- Years active: 1964–2001

William John Creber (July 26, 1931 – March 7, 2019) was an American art director and production designer. He was nominated for three Academy Awards in the category Best Art Direction. In 2004 he received an Art Directors Guild Lifetime Achievement Award and in 2020 he was inaugurated into their hall of fame. He is largely responsible for the design of the miniature model Flying Sub in the 1960s television series Voyage to the Bottom of the Sea and the miniature model Gemini 12 spaceship in the later television series Lost in Space. He died of complications of pneumonia on March 7, 2019, in Los Angeles.

== Selected filmography ==
Creber was nominated for three Academy Awards for Best Art Direction:

- The Greatest Story Ever Told (1965)
- The Poseidon Adventure (1972)
- The Towering Inferno (1974)

Other work:

- The Strange Monster of Strawberry Cove (1971)
- Shadow of Fear (1979)
