= Louis Diage =

American set decorator (1905–1979)

- Born: July 22, 1905; Illinois
- Died: October 9, 1979 (aged 74); San Clemente, California
- Occupation: Set decorator
- Years active: 1936-1967

Louis Diage (July 22, 1905 – October 9, 1979) was an American set decorator. He was nominated for three Academy Awards in the category Best Art Direction.

== Selected filmography ==
Diage was nominated for three Academy Awards for Best Art Direction:

- The Solid Gold Cadillac (1956)
- Pal Joey (1957)
- Bell, Book and Candle (1958)
