= Merideth Boswell =

American set decorator and production designer

- Born: Little Rock, Arkansas, U.S.
- Education: University of Arkansas
- Occupation(s): Set decorator Production designer
- Years active: 1988–present

Merideth Boswell is an American set decorator and production designer. She is best known for her work in the films Apollo 13 (1995) and How the Grinch Stole Christmas (2000), both of which earned her nominations for an Academy Award for Best Art Direction. Boswell was born in Little Rock, Arkansas. She graduated with a Bachelor of Arts in ceramics from the University of Arkansas.

== Selected filmography ==
=== As set decorator ===
- He Said, She Said (1991)
- Zandalee (1991)
- The Gun in Betty Lou's Handbag (1992)
- Natural Born Killers (1994)
- The Scout (1994)
- Apollo 13 (1995)
- Nixon (1995)
- That Thing You Do! (1996)
- U Turn (1997)
- Mighty Joe Young (1998)
- EDtv (1999)
- How the Grinch Stole Christmas (2000)
- Bandits (2001)
- How Do You Know (2010)

=== As production designer ===
- The Three Burials of Melquiades Estrada (2005)
- In the Electric Mist (2009)
- The Sunset Limited (2011)
- The Last Exorcism Part II (2013)
- The Homesman (2014)
- I Saw the Light (2015)

== Awards and nominations ==
=== Academy Awards ===
Year	Nominated work	Category	Result
1996	Apollo 13	Best Art Direction	Nominated
2001	How the Grinch Stole Christmas	Best Art Direction	Nominated
