= W. Stewart Campbell =

American art director

- Born: December 2, 1933
- Died: February 11, 2009 (aged 75)
- Occupations: Production designer Art director
- Years active: 1974-2005

William Stewart Campbell (December 2, 1933 - February 11, 2009) was an American production designer and art director. He was nominated for three Academy Awards in the category Best Art Direction.

== Selected filmography ==
Campbell was nominated for three Academy Awards for Best Art Direction:

- Chinatown (1974)
- Shampoo (1975)
- The Right Stuff (1983)
