= Grace Gregory =

American set decorator

- Born: 1901
- Died: November 14, 1985 (aged 83–84)
- Occupation: Set decorator
- Years active: 1947-1969

Grace Gregory (1901 – November 14, 1985) was an American set decorator. She was nominated for two Academy Awards in the category Best Art Direction.

== Selected filmography ==
Gregory was nominated for two Academy Awards for Best Art Direction:

- The Country Girl (1954)
- Love with the Proper Stranger (1963)
