= Perry Ferguson =

American art director

- Born: November 13, 1901; Texas
- Died: December 27, 1963 (aged 62); Los Angeles, California
- Occupation: Art director
- Years active: 1933-1963

Perry Ferguson (November 13, 1901 – December 27, 1963) was an American art director. He was nominated for five Academy Awards in the category Best Art Direction. He was born in Texas and died in Los Angeles, California.

== Selected filmography ==
Ferguson was nominated for five Academy Awards for Best Art Direction:

- Winterset (1936)
- Citizen Kane (1941)
- The Pride of the Yankees (1942)
- The North Star (1943)
- Casanova Brown (1944)
