= Carl Anderson (art director) =

American art director (1903–1989)

- Born: June 13, 1903; Dover, New Jersey
- Died: September 22, 1989 (aged 86); Hollywood, California
- Occupation: Art director
- Years active: 1943-1985

Carl Anderson (June 13, 1903 – September 22, 1989) was an American art director. He was nominated for two Academy Awards in the category Best Art Direction.

== Selected filmography ==
Anderson was nominated for two Academy Awards for Best Art Direction:

- The Last Angry Man (1959)
- Lady Sings the Blues (1972)
