= Herman A. Blumenthal =

American art director and production designer

- Born: May 21, 1916; Los Angeles, California, USA
- Died: March 30, 1986 (aged 69); Los Angeles, California, USA
- Other name: Herman Allen Blumenthal
- Occupations: art director and production designer
- Years active: 1955–1981

Herman Allen Blumenthal (May 21, 1916 – March 30, 1986) was an American art director and production designer for films. He shared in two Academy Awards for Best Art Direction, for his work on Cleopatra (1963) and Hello, Dolly! (1969). He had previously been nominated for Journey to the Center of the Earth (1959).
