= Victor A. Gangelin =

American set decorator

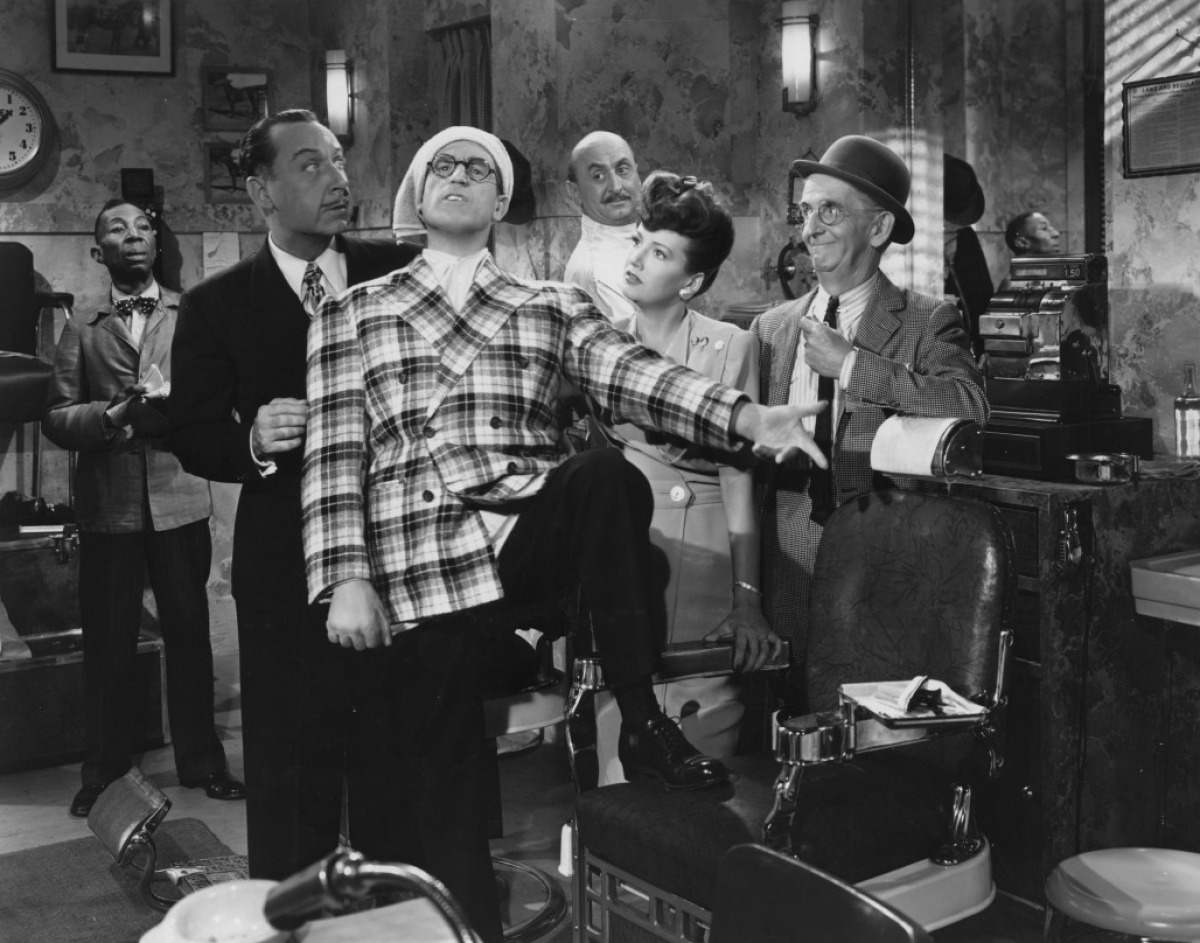
- Born: March 4, 1899; Milwaukee, Wisconsin
- Died: April 2, 1967 (aged 68); Los Angeles, California
- Occupation: Set decorator
- Years active: 1936-1966

Victor A. Gangelin (March 4, 1899 – April 2, 1967) was an American feature film and television set decorator. He won an Oscar (shared with Boris Leven) for Best Art Direction-Set Decoration, Color for West Side Story (1961). Gangelin was also nominated for another Oscar (with Mark-Lee Kirk) for Best Art Direction-Interior Direction, Black-and-White for Since You Went Away (1944).

== Career ==
He served as a set director and assistant department head at Warner Brothers studio. Along with his Academy Award-nominated films, his 47 film and television credits include the John Wayne epics The Searchers (1956) and The Alamo (1960) as well as episodes of The Roy Rogers Show and My Mother the Car. His last credit was the 1966 film Duel at Diablo starring James Garner and Sidney Poitier.

== Later life ==
Gangelin died at age 68 in Los Angeles, California. His collection of "over 1,000 early authentic American and English antiques of museum quality" was offered at an estate sale in October 1967.

== Selected filmography ==
Gangelin won an Academy Award for Best Art Direction and was nominated for another:

Won

- West Side Story (1961)

Nominated

- Since You Went Away (1944)
