= Daniel B. Cathcart =

American art director

- Born: December 8, 1906; Idaho
- Died: January 23, 1959 (aged 52); Los Angeles, California
- Occupation: Art director
- Years active: 1937-1959

Daniel B. Cathcart (December 8, 1906 – January 23, 1959) was an American art director. He was nominated for two Academy Awards in the category Best Art Direction. He was born in Idaho and died in Los Angeles, California.

== Selected filmography ==
Cathcart was nominated for two Academy Awards for Best Art Direction:

- Thousands Cheer (1943)
- Kismet (1944)
