= Arthur Jeph Parker =

American set decorator (1923–2002)

- Born: June 4, 1923
- Died: December 15, 2002 (aged 79); Tucson, Arizona
- Occupation: Set decorator
- Years active: 1957-1989

Arthur Jeph Parker (June 4, 1923 – December 15, 2002) was an American set decorator. He was nominated for two Academy Awards in the category Best Art Direction.

== Selected filmography ==
Parker was nominated for two Academy Awards for Best Art Direction:

- The Shootist (1976);
- The China Syndrome (1979).
