= Bertram C. Granger =

American set decorator (1892–1967)

- Born: March 31, 1892; Wyoming
- Died: October 28, 1967 (aged 75); Los Angeles, California
- Occupation: Set decorator
- Years active: 1935-1966

Bertram C. Granger (March 31, 1892 – October 28, 1967) was an American set decorator. He was nominated for two Academy Awards in the category Best Art Direction. He was born in Wyoming and died in Los Angeles, California.

== Selected filmography ==
Granger was nominated for two Academy Awards for Best Art Direction:

- Five Graves to Cairo (1943)
- For Whom the Bell Tolls (1943)
