= Jerry Wunderlich =

American set decorator

- Born: August 18, 1925
- Died: May 14, 1999 (aged 73); Hollywood, California
- Occupation: Set decorator
- Years active: 1958-1990

Jerry Wunderlich (August 18, 1925 – May 14, 1999) was an American set decorator. He was nominated for two Academy Awards in the category Best Art Direction.

== Selected filmography ==
Wunderlich was nominated for two Academy Awards for Best Art Direction:

- The Exorcist (1973)
- The Last Tycoon (1976)
