= Cary Odell =

American art director

- Born: December 20, 1910; Indiana
- Died: January 19, 1988 (aged 77); San Luis Obispo, California
- Occupation: Art director
- Years active: 1937-1974

Cary Odell (December 20, 1910 – January 19, 1988) was an American art director. He was nominated for three Academy Awards in the category Best Art Direction. He was employed for several decades by Columbia Pictures. He was born in Indiana and died in San Luis Obispo, California.

== Selected filmography ==
Odell was nominated for three Academy Awards for Best Art Direction:

- Cover Girl (1944)
- Bell, Book and Candle (1958)
- Seven Days in May (1964)
