= Robert W. Laing =

British production designer

- Occupations: Production designer Art director Set decorator
- Years active: 1968–2000

Robert W. Laing is a British production designer, art director and set decorator. He won an Academy Award and was nominated for another in the category Best Art Direction.

== Selected filmography ==
Laing won an Academy Award for Best Art Direction and was nominated for another:

Won for Art Direction at the 55th Academy Awards for

- Gandhi (1982) - Stuart Craig, Bob Laing; Set Decoration: Michael Seirton

Nominated for Art Direction at the 45th Academy Awards for

- Travels with My Aunt (1972) - John Box, Gil Parrondo, Robert W. Laing
