= Jack Okey =

American art director (1889–1963)

- Born: June 3, 1889; Los Angeles, California
- Died: January 8, 1963 (aged 73); Los Angeles, California
- Occupation: Art director
- Years active: 1913–1959

John Clark Okey (June 3, 1889 – January 8, 1963) was an American art director.

== Personal life ==
He was raised in Los Angeles and attended the Harvard School for Boys, where he excelled in sports. After leaving, he was given instruction in art by his uncle, the California artist, J. Bond Francisco. While he was in his early 20s, he spent several years in Paris studying art. While in Paris, he met a pianist from Indiana, Marie Wilson, whom he married shortly after his return to Los Angeles in 1913. They had one son and two daughters and remained married until her death in October 1961.

He was born and died in Los Angeles, California.

== Career ==
Around the time of his marriage, he became involved in the nascent film industry in the Los Angeles area and was involved in the design and construction of some of the earliest studios there. He continued in the film industry as an art director until his retirement in 1959. In the mid-1930s he spent several years in England working for Alexander Korda. After his return to the United States, he spent the remainder of his active career working for RKO Studios.

He was nominated for two Academy Awards for Best Art Direction for the films Sally (1929) and Experiment Perilous (1944).

== Selected filmography ==
- Sally (1929)
- Experiment Perilous (1944)
- It's a Wonderful Life (1946)
