= Patrick McLoughlin (set decorator) =

- Occupations: Set decorator, actor
- Years active: 1961-1982

Patrick McLoughlin was a set decorator and actor. He was nominated for two Academy Awards in the category Best Art Direction.

== Selected filmography ==
McLoughlin was nominated for two Academy Awards for Best Art Direction:

- Becket (1964)
- Anne of the Thousand Days (1970)
