= Stuart A. Reiss =

American set decorator

- Born: July 15, 1921; Chicago, United States
- Died: December 21, 2014 (aged 93)
- Occupation: Set decorator
- Years active: 1947-1986

Stuart A. Reiss (July 15, 1921 – December 21, 2014) was an American set decorator. He won two Academy Awards and was nominated for four more in the category Best Art Direction. He worked on more than 100 films from 1947 to 1986.

== Selected filmography ==
Reiss won two Academy Awards for Best Art Direction and was nominated for four more:

Won

- The Diary of Anne Frank (1959)
- Fantastic Voyage (1966)

Nominated

- Titanic (1953)
- Teenage Rebel (1956)
- What a Way to Go! (1964)
- Doctor Dolittle (1967)
