= Howard Bristol =

American set decorator

- Born: August 14, 1902; Iowa, United States
- Died: February 11, 1971 (aged 68); Santa Barbara, California, United States
- Occupation: Set decorator
- Years active: 1936-1968

Howard Bristol (August 14, 1902 – February 11, 1971) was an American set decorator. He was nominated for nine Academy Awards in the category Best Art Direction. He worked on 56 films between 1936 and 1968.

== Selected filmography ==
Bristol was nominated for nine Academy Awards for Best Art Direction:

- Star! (1968)
- Thoroughly Modern Millie (1967)
- Flower Drum Song (1961)
- Guys and Dolls (1955)
- Hans Christian Andersen (1952)
- The Princess and the Pirate (1944)
- The North Star (1943)
- The Pride of the Yankees (1942)
- The Little Foxes (1941)
