= Jack Stephens (set decorator) =

American set decorator

- Born: Chittagong, British India
- Occupation: Set decorator
- Years active: 1949-1986

Jack Stephens was a set decorator. He won an Academy Award and was nominated for another in the category Best Art Direction.

== Selected filmography ==
Stephens won an Academy Award for Best Art Direction and was nominated for another:

Won

- Tess (1979)

Nominated

- The Mission (1986)

== Biography ==
Jack Stephens attended High Wycombe Royal Grammar School (U.K.) from 1925 to 1930.
