= Vernon Dixon =

British set decorator

- Died: 14 June 2009; Torremelinos, Spain
- Occupation: Set decorator
- Years active: 1946-1981

Vernon Dixon (died 14 June 2009) was a British set decorator. He won three Academy Awards in the category Best Art Direction.

== Selected filmography ==
Dixon won three Academy Awards for Best Art Direction:

- Oliver! (1968)
- Nicholas and Alexandra (1971)
- Barry Lyndon (1975)
