= Jill Quertier =

English set decorator

- Born: 1936 (age 88–89); Bromley, Kent, England
- Occupation: Set decorator

Jill Quertier (born 1936) is an English set decorator. She won an Academy Award in the category Best Production Design for the film Shakespeare in Love and was nominated for another for Quills.

== Selected filmography ==
- Shakespeare in Love (1998; won with Martin Childs)
- Quills (2000; nominated with Martin Childs)
