= Leland Fuller =

American art director

- Born: February 16, 1899; Riverside, California
- Died: October 9, 1962 (aged 63); Hollywood, California
- Other name: Lee Fuller
- Occupation: Art director
- Years active: 1943-1962

Leland Fuller (February 16, 1899 – October 9, 1962) was an American art director. He was nominated for six Academy Awards in the category Best Art Direction. He worked on more than 50 films between 1943 and 1962.

== Selected filmography ==
Fuller was nominated for six Academy Awards for Best Art Direction:

- Laura (1944)
- On the Riviera (1951)
- Fourteen Hours (1951)
- Viva Zapata! (1952)
- The President's Lady (1953)
- Desirée (1954)
