= Hans Peters (art director) =

English art director

- Born: 23 July 1894; London, England
- Died: 29 September 1976 (aged 82); London, England
- Occupation: Art director
- Years active: 1934–1964
- Employer: Metro-Goldwyn-Mayer (1944-1962)

Hans Peters (23 July 1894 – 29 September 1976) was an English art director. He was nominated for five Academy Awards in the category Best Art Direction. In 1944 he joined Metro-Goldwyn-Mayer and in 1959, he became assistant to George Davis, the studio's new supervising art director.

== Selected filmography ==
- Nancy Steele Is Missing! (1937)
- The Picture of Dorian Gray (1945)
- The Red Danube (1949)
- Knights of the Round Table (1953)
- Lust for Life (1956)
- The Americanization of Emily (1964)
