= Jim Erickson =

American-Canadian set decorator

James Erickson (born about 1951) is an American-Canadian set decorator. He won the Academy Award for Best Production Design for his work in Lincoln, and was nominated for There Will Be Blood. He has also done set decoration for Ali and Independence Day.

Jim studied Technical Theater at Minnesota State University Moorhead and was among the most honored of his fellow alumni at the July, 2013 50th Anniversary of the MSUM "Straw Hat Players".
