= George Gaines (set decorator) =

American set decorator

- Born: June 6, 1933; Illinois, U.S.
- Died: May 13, 1986 (aged 52); Illinois, U.S.
- Occupation: Set decorator
- Years active: 1964-1986

George Gaines (June 6, 1933 – May 13, 1986) was an American set decorator. He worked on films such as American Gigolo and The Big Chill. He won two Academy Awards and was nominated for another two in the category Best Art Direction.

== Selected filmography ==
Gaines won two Academy Awards for Best Art Direction and was nominated for two more:

Won

- All the President's Men (1976)
- Heaven Can Wait (1978)

Nominated

- Shampoo (1975)
- The Cotton Club (1984)
