= Malcolm C. Bert =

American art director (1902–1973)

- Born: December 4, 1902
- Died: March 18, 1973 (aged 70); Westlake Village, California
- Occupation: Art director
- Years active: 1953-1973

Malcolm Charles Bert (December 4, 1902 – March 18, 1973) was an American art director. He was nominated for two Academy Awards in the category Best Art Direction.

== Selected filmography ==
Bert was nominated for two Academy Awards for Best Art Direction:

- A Star Is Born (1954)
- Auntie Mame (1958)

Other work:

- The Mystery in Dracula's Castle (1973)
