= John B. Goodman (art director) =

American art director

- Born: 15 August 1901; Denver, Colorado
- Died: 30 June 1991 (aged 89); Los Angeles, California
- Occupation: Art director
- Years active: 1934-1968

John B. Goodman (August 15, 1901 – June 30, 1991) was an American art director. He won an Oscar and was nominated for three more in the category Best Art Direction. He worked on 208 films between 1934 and 1968, including It's a Gift (1934) starring W. C. Fields. Goodman was a known bibliophile as well, with particular interests in American maritime history, early sailing ships, the American West, California, and the Gold Rush. These personal interests complemented his professional work, enabling Goodman to craft historically accurate sets.

== Selected filmography ==
Goodman won an Academy Award for Best Art Direction and was nominated for three more:

- If I Were King (1938 - nominated)
- The Spoilers (1942 - nominated)
- Phantom of the Opera (1943 - won)
- The Climax (1944 - nominated)

=== Other films ===
- The Impostor (1944)
