= James W. Payne =

American set decorator

- Born: November 11, 1929; Ogden, Utah, USA
- Died: August 12, 1992 (aged 62); Salt Lake City, Utah, USA
- Occupation: Set decorator
- Years active: 1940-1989

James W. Payne (November 11, 1929 – August 12, 1992) was an American set decorator. He won an Academy Award and was nominated for two more in the category Best Art Direction.

== Selected filmography ==
Payne won an Academy Award for Best Art Direction and was nominated for two more:

Won

- The Sting (1973)

Nominated

- Come Blow Your Horn (1963)
- The Oscar (1966)
