= A. Roland Fields =

American art director

- Born: June 13, 1900; New Orleans, Louisiana, USA
- Died: September 11, 1950 (aged 50); Los Angeles, California, USA
- Occupation: Art director
- Years active: 1942 - 1951

A. Roland Fields (June 13, 1900 – September 11, 1950) was an American art director. He won an Academy Award and was nominated for another two in the category Best Art Direction. He worked on 39 films between 1942 and 1951.

== Selected filmography ==
Fields won one Academy Award and was nominated for two more for Best Art Direction:

- Citizen Kane (1941 - nominated)
- The Magnificent Ambersons (1942 - nominated)
- Blood on the Sun (1945 - won)
