= William H. Tuntke =

American art director (1906–1997)

- Born: September 24, 1906
- Died: August 25, 1997 (aged 90)
- Occupation: Art director
- Years active: 1956-1985

William H. Tuntke (September 24, 1906 – August 25, 1997) was an American art director. He was nominated for two Academy Awards in the category Best Art Direction.

== Selected filmography ==
Tuntke was nominated for two Academy Awards for Best Art Direction:

- Mary Poppins (1964)
- The Andromeda Strain (1971)
