= Ruby R. Levitt =

American set decorator (1907–1992)

- Born: September 12, 1907
- Died: January 18, 1992 (aged 84); Encino, California, U.S.
- Occupation: Set decorator
- Years active: 1946–1980

Ruby R. Levitt (September 12, 1907 – January 18, 1992) was an American set decorator. She was nominated for four Academy Awards in the category Best Art Direction.

== Selected filmography ==
Levitt was nominated for four Academy Awards for Best Art Direction:

- Pillow Talk (1959)
- The Sound of Music (1965)
- The Andromeda Strain (1971)
- Chinatown (1974)
