= Jack D. Moore =

American set decorator

- Born: Jack Dehm Moore; April 15, 1906; Toledo, Ohio, U.S.
- Died: December 29, 1998 (aged 92); Santa Monica, California, U.S.
- Occupation: Set decorator
- Years active: 1934-1970

Jack Dehm Moore (April 15, 1906 – December 29, 1998) was an American set decorator. He won an Academy Award and was nominated six times in the category Best Art Direction.

== Selected filmography ==
Moore won an Academy Award for Best Art Direction and was nominated for six more:

Won

- Little Women (1949)

Nominated

- Random Harvest (1942)
- Sweet Charity (1969)
- Young Bess (1953)
- The Story of Three Loves (1953)
- Sweet Charity (1969)
- Airport (1970)
