= Ben Van Os =

Dutch production designer

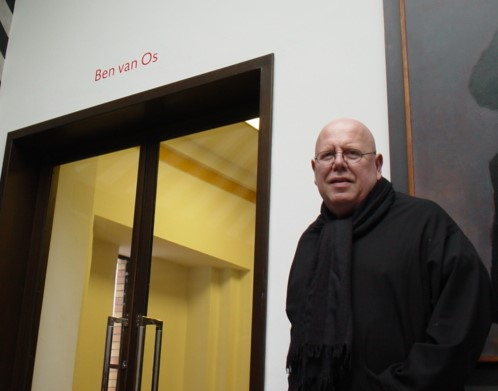
- Born: 1 December 1944; The Hague, Netherlands
- Died: 2 July 2012 (aged 67); The Hague, Netherlands
- Occupation(s): Production designer Art director
- Years active: 1985–2004

Ben Van Os (1 December 1944 – 2 July 2012) was a Dutch production designer and art director. He received two Academy Award for Best Art Direction nominations for his works in Orlando (1993) and Girl with a Pearl Earring (2003). The latter of which also earned him a BAFTA Award for Best Production Design nomination.

== Selected filmography ==
- Orlando (1992)
- Girl with a Pearl Earring (2003)
