= Harry Cordwell =

- Born: 1922; Barton upon Irwell, Lancashire, England
- Died: 1995 (aged 72–73); Camden, London, England
- Occupation: Set decorator
- Years active: 1968-1990

Harry Cordwell (1922–1995) was a British set decorator. He was nominated for two Academy Awards in the category Best Art Direction.

== Selected filmography ==
Cordwell was nominated for two Academy Awards for Best Art Direction:

- Victor/Victoria (1982)
- Empire of the Sun (1987)
