= Frank E. Hughes =

American set decorator

- Born: June 14, 1893; Kern, California, USA
- Died: April 26, 1947 (aged 53)
- Occupation: Set decorator
- Years active: 1927-1947

Frank E. Hughes (June 14, 1893 – April 26, 1947) was an American set decorator. He won an Academy Award and was nominated for another in the category Best Art Direction.

== Selected filmography ==
Hughes won an Academy Award for Best Art Direction and was nominated for another:

Won

- Anna and the King of Siam (1946)

Nominated

- The Keys of the Kingdom (1944)
