= Charles S. Thompson (set decorator) =

Canadian-born film set decorator

- Born: August 28, 1908; Canada
- Died: July 9, 1994 (aged 85); Los Angeles, California, USA
- Occupation: Set decorator
- Years active: 1943-1973

Charles S. Thompson (August 28, 1908 – July 9, 1994) was a Canadian-born Hollywood set decorator, with nearly 200 films to his credit in a career that lasted 30 years. He cut his teeth on a string of B movies in the early 1940s, before breaking into John Ford's inner circle of regulars. Amongst his credits for the director were Rio Grande (1950) and The Quiet Man (1952), for which he received an Academy Award nomination. Thompson fared better with higher profile projects throughout the 1950s and 1960s, particularly in television, working on such series as Perry Mason, The Fugitive and The Man from U.N.C.L.E., whilst on the feature film front, his work can be viewed in Samuel Fuller's Shock Corridor (1963) and the Clint Eastwood vehicle, Joe Kidd (1972). Thompson scored a second Oscar nomination in 1965 for his work on A Patch of Blue. He died on July 9, 1994, at the age of 85.
