= Fredric Hope =

American art director

- Born: January 22, 1900; New Brighton, Pennsylvania
- Died: April 20, 1937 (aged 37); Hollywood, California
- Other names: Fredric Putnam Hope; Frederick Hope; Frederic Hope; Fred Hope
- Occupation: Art director
- Years active: 1922-1937

Fredric Hope (January 22, 1900 – April 20, 1937) was an American art director. He won an Academy Award for Best Art Direction for the film The Merry Widow. He was born in New Brighton, Pennsylvania to Helen Dodge and Harry Hope. He was educated at Cleveland School of Art, Art Institute of Chicago and Otis Art Institute. In 1922 he became a draftsman and an art director with Metro-Goldwyn-Mayer. He died in Hollywood, California.

== Selected filmography ==
- The Courtship of Miles Standish (1923)
- Flesh and the Devil (1926)
- The Big House (1930)
- Min and Bill (1930)
- The Merry Widow (1934)
- Anna Karenina (1935)
- A Tale of Two Cities (1935)
- Romeo and Juliet (1936)
- Maytime (1937)
