= Edward Carrere =

Art director (1906–1984)

- Born: 13 October 1906; Mexico
- Died: 19 December 1984 (aged 78); Mission Viejo, California
- Other name: Ed Carrere
- Occupation: Art director
- Years active: 1947–1970

Edward Carrere (13 October 1906 – 19 December 1984) born in Mexico, first hit Hollywood in 1947, making his debut as an art director on My Wild Irish Rose. He garnered his first Academy Award nomination two years later for the Errol Flynn epic Adventures of Don Juan.

Throughout the late 1940s and the 1950s he worked on such films as White Heat (1949), The Fountainhead (1949), The Flame and the Arrow (1950), Dial M for Murder (1954), Sweet Smell of Success (1957), Separate Tables (1958) and Elmer Gantry (1960).

His second Oscar nomination was in 1960 was for the Roosevelt biopic Sunrise at Campobello. He won the Academy Award seven years later for his work on Camelot.
