= Mark-Lee Kirk =

American art director (1895–1969)

- Born: May 16, 1895; Pittsburgh, Pennsylvania
- Died: December 10, 1969 (aged 74); Los Angeles, California
- Resting place: Union Dale Cemetery, Pittsburgh
- Occupation: Art Director
- Years active: 1936-1959

Charles Mark-Lee Kirk (May 16, 1895 – December 10, 1969) was an American art director. He was nominated for three Academy Awards in the category of Best Art Direction. He worked on 52 films between 1936 and 1959.

== Selected filmography ==
Kirk was nominated for three Academy Awards for Best Art Direction:

- My Favorite Wife (1940)
- George Washington Slept Here (1942)
- Since You Went Away (1944)
