= Tambi Larsen =

Danish art director (1914–2001)

- Born: 11 September 1914; Bangalore, British India
- Died: 24 March 2001 (aged 86); Hollywood, California, United States
- Occupation: Art director
- Years active: 1954–1980

Tambi Larsen (11 September 1914 – 24 March 2001) was a Danish art director born in Bangalore, India. He emigrated to the United States at the age of 20, where he attended Yale Drama School. He married Barbara Dole (daughter of James Dole) in 1941 and became an American citizen in 1943. Tambi (pronounced "Tom' bee") struggled to make a living as a set designer for Broadway shows. During World War II, Larsen worked for the Office of War Information, first broadcasting the news in Danish, and after V-E Day, designing exhibits in Denmark as Assistant Cultural Relations Officer.

After the war, the family—which now included son Peter and daughter Pamela—moved to Hollywood, where Larsen tried his hand in the movie industry. He was immediately hired by Paramount Pictures as an Assistant Art Director. His first official job was on 1953's The Secret of the Incas. Two years after that debut, he won an Oscar for The Rose Tattoo. He was also nominated for Hud, The Spy Who Came in from the Cold, The Molly Maguires, and Heaven's Gate, and he won the British BAFTA award for The Spy Who Came In From The Cold. He designed at least 41 movies during his career.

During a time-out from Hollywood while he designed a movie about Father Damien, Larsen began visiting Hawaii. He and his wife bought a home in Kauai, in 1961. Over the years, he explored the island, taking snapshots which he then drew with coloured pencils. He called his exhibits "100 Entertainments." The Kauai Historical Society is preparing to publish a book of his 100 drawings.
