= Fred M. MacLean =

American set decorator

- Born: July 9, 1898; North Dakota, U.S.
- Died: June 3, 1976 (aged 77); Los Angeles, California, U.S.
- Occupation: Set decorator
- Years active: 1941–1965

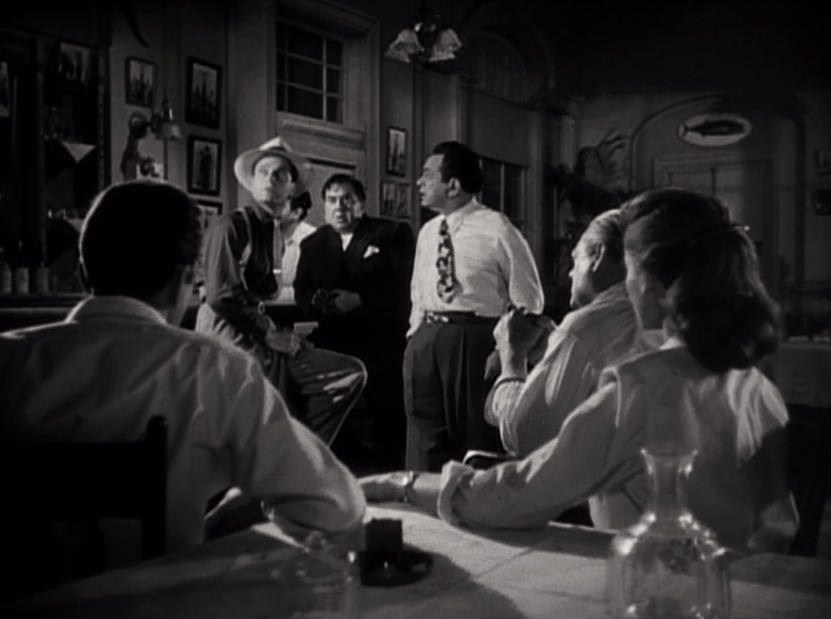
Key Largo (1948) trailer 2.jpg

Fred Merrill MacLean (July 9, 1898 in North Dakota, USA – June 3, 1976 in Los Angeles, California, USA) was an American set decorator, mostly known for Key Largo (1948), The Big Sleep (1946) and White Heat (1949). He was nominated for three Academy Awards in the category Best Art Direction. He worked on 60 films between 1941 and 1965. He was married to Margaret MacLean, and they had four children together: Martin MacLean, Audrey MacLean, Gregory MacLean and Joan MacLean.

== Selected filmography ==
MacLean was nominated for three Academy Awards for Best Art Direction:

- Sergeant York (1941)
- The Adventures of Mark Twain (1944)
- The Greatest Story Ever Told (1965)
