= Robert Clatworthy (art director) =

American art director

- Born: December 31, 1911; Illinois, U.S.
- Died: March 2, 1992 (aged 80); La Cañada Flintridge, California, U.S.
- Occupation: Art director
- Years active: 1943-1977

Robert Clatworthy (December 31, 1911 – March 2, 1992) was an American art director. He won an Academy Award and was nominated four more times in the category Best Art Direction.

== Selected filmography ==
Clatworthy won an Academy Award for Best Art Direction and was nominated for four more:

Won

- Ship of Fools (1965)

Nominated

- Psycho (1960)
- That Touch of Mink (1962)
- Inside Daisy Clover (1965)
- Guess Who's Coming to Dinner (1967)
