= Fay Babcock =

Hollywood set decorator

- Born: June 15, 1895
- Died: November 12, 1970 (aged 75)
- Occupation: American scenery/set designer

Fay Babcock (June 15, 1895 – November 12, 1970) was a Hollywood set decorator, and one of the first women to have much success in the profession. She earned an Oscar nomination for 1942's The Talk of the Town and 1944's Cover Girl. Her other credits include My Sister Eileen (1942), Love Me Tender (1956) and the TV series Maverick.
