= Arthur Krams =

American set designer (1912-1985)

- Born: July 15, 1912; New York City, New York, USA
- Died: September 29, 1985 (aged 73); Los Angeles, California, USA
- Occupation: Set designer
- Years active: 1946-1969

Arthur Krams (July 15, 1912 – September 29, 1985) was an American set designer. He first made a name for himself working for MGM on films such as Holiday in Mexico, Easter Parade and The Student Prince in the mid 1940s. Later, he went on to work with Paramount Pictures. While there, he shared an Oscar for The Rose Tattoo (1955). Over his career, Krams would be co-nominated for an Oscar seven more times.
