= F. Keogh Gleason =

American set director (1906–1982)

- Born: April 14, 1906; Minnesota, USA
- Died: December 18, 1982 (aged 76); Los Angeles, California
- Other name: Francis Keogh Gleason
- Occupation: set decorator
- Years active: 1942-1970

Francis Keogh Gleason (April 14, 1906 – December 18, 1982) was a resident set decorator at MGM studios for over 40 years. In that time he won 4 Academy Awards (for An American in Paris in 1951, The Bad and the Beautiful in 1952, Somebody Up There Likes Me in 1956 and "Gigi" in 1958) and was nominated an additional 3 times. Gleason graduated from the Minnesota School of Fine Arts (now known as the Minneapolis College of Art and Design) in 1927.
