= 58th Academy Awards =

- Official poster
- Date: March 24, 1986
- Site: Dorothy Chandler Pavilion; Los Angeles, California, U.S.
- Hosted by: Alan Alda; Jane Fonda; Robin Williams
- Produced by: Stanley Donen
- Directed by: Marty Pasetta

Highlights
- Best Picture: Out of Africa
- Most awards: Out of Africa (7)
- Most nominations: The Color Purple and Out of Africa (11)

TV in the United States
- Network: ABC
- Duration: 3 hours, 11 minutes
- Ratings: 37.8 million 27.3% (Nielsen ratings)

The 58th Academy Awards ceremony, organized by the Academy of Motion Picture Arts and Sciences (AMPAS), took place on March 24, 1986, at the Dorothy Chandler Pavilion in Los Angeles beginning at 6:00 p.m. PST / 9:00 p.m. EST. During the ceremony, AMPAS presented Academy Awards (commonly referred to as Oscars) in 23 categories honoring films released in 1985. The ceremony, televised in the United States by ABC, was produced by Stanley Donen and directed by Marty Pasetta. Actors Alan Alda, Jane Fonda, and Robin Williams co-hosted the show. Fonda hosted the gala for the second time, having previously been a co-host of the 49th ceremony held in 1977. Meanwhile, this was Alda and Williams's first Oscars hosting stint. Eight days earlier, in a ceremony held at The Beverly Hilton in Beverly Hills, California, on March 16, the Academy Awards for Technical Achievement were presented by host Macdonald Carey.

Out of Africa won seven awards, including Best Picture. Meanwhile, fellow Best Picture nominee The Color Purple failed to win any of its eleven nominations. Other winners included Cocoon and Witness with two awards and Anna & Bella, Back to the Future, Broken Rainbow, Kiss of the Spider Woman, Mask, Molly's Pilgrim, The Official Story, Prizzi's Honor, Ran, The Trip to Bountiful, White Nights, and Witness to War: Dr. Charlie Clements with one. The telecast received mixed reviews, and it garnered 37.8 million viewers in the United States.

== Winners and nominees ==
The nominees for the 58th Academy Awards were announced on February 4, 1986, by Academy president Robert Wise and actress Patty Duke. The Color Purple and Out of Africa led all nominees with eleven each. Winners were announced during the awards ceremony on March 24, 1986. With its 11 nominations and zero wins, The Color Purple joined 1977's The Turning Point as the most nominated films in Oscar history without a single win. By virtue of her father John and grandfather Walter's wins for Best Director and Best Supporting Actor respectively for 1948's The Treasure of the Sierra Madre, Best Supporting Actress winner Anjelica Huston made them the first three-generation Oscar winning family. For the first time in Oscars history, all lead acting nominees were born in the United States. Argentina's The Official Story became the first Latin American film to win the Best Foreign Language Film category.

=== Awards ===
Winners are listed first, highlighted in boldface and indicated with a double dagger (‡).

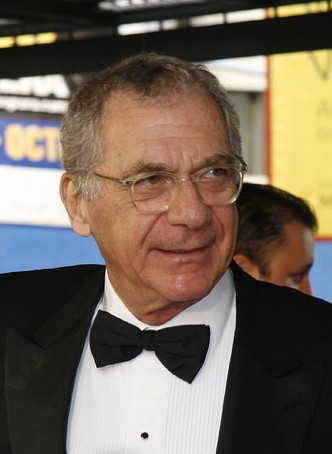
Sydney Pollack, Best Picture and Best Director winner

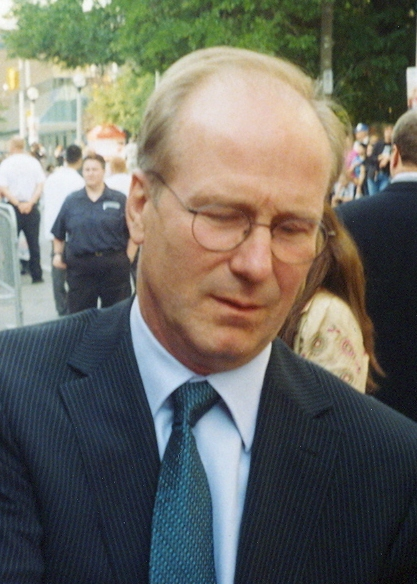
William Hurt, Best Actor winner

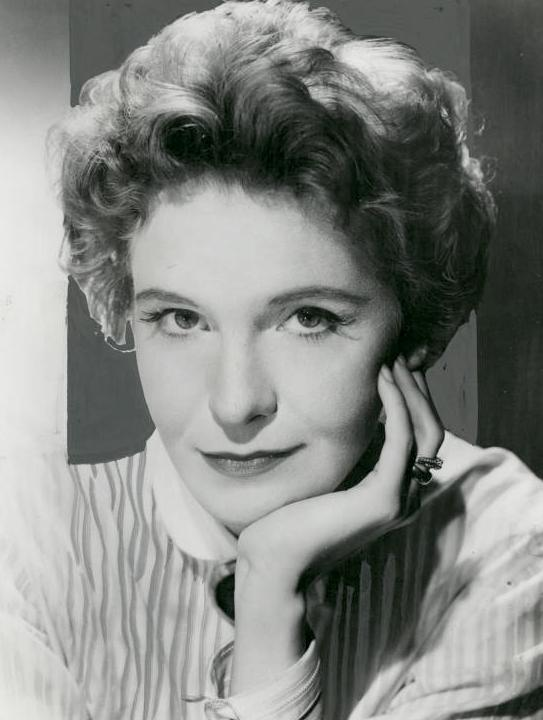
Geraldine Page, Best Actress winner

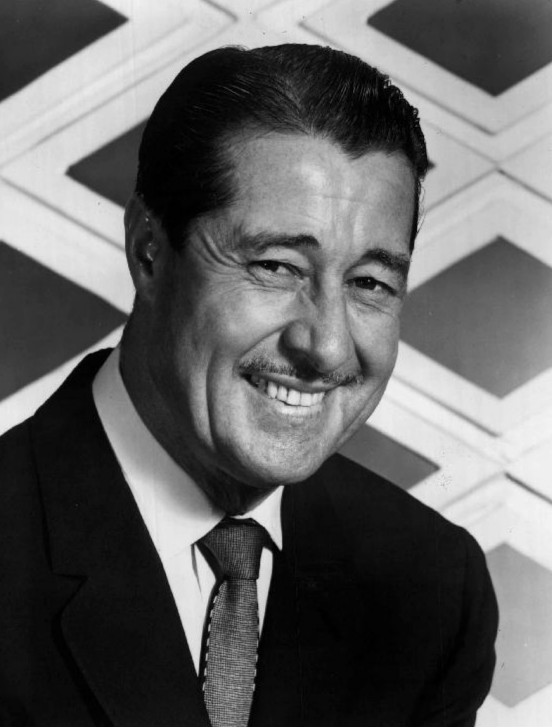
Don Ameche, Best Supporting Actor winner

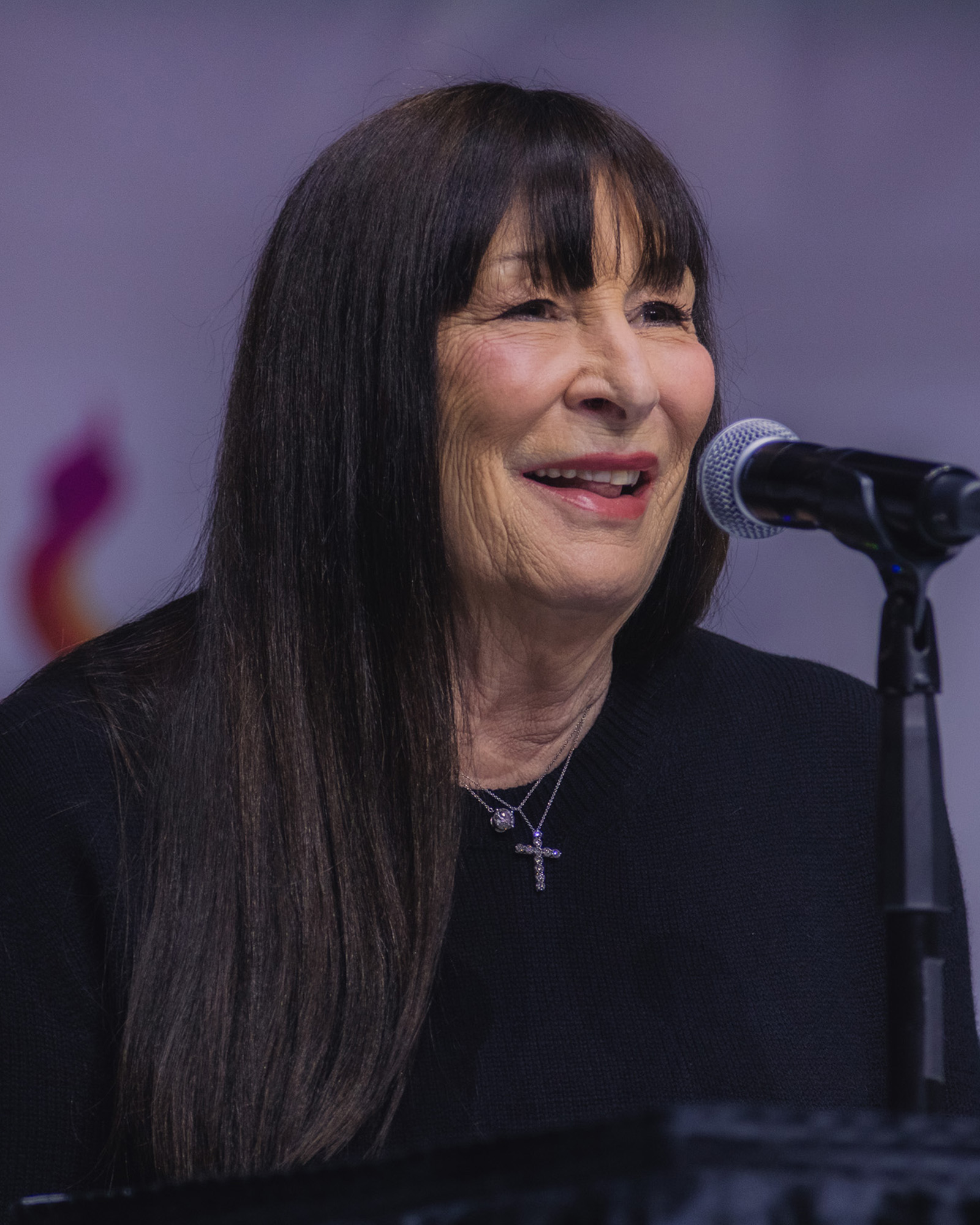
Anjelica Huston, Best Supporting Actress winner

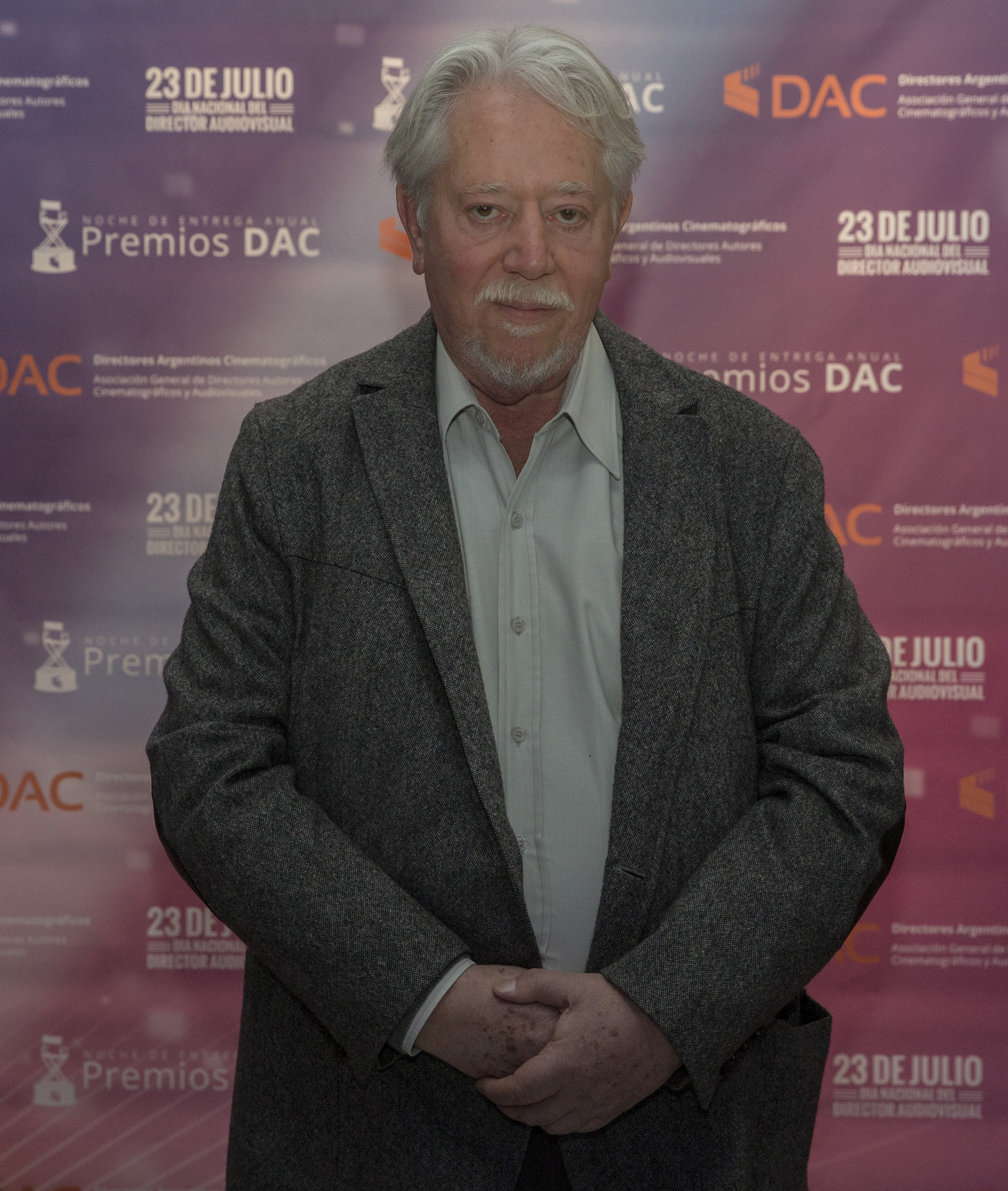
Luis Puenzo, Best Foreign Language Film winner

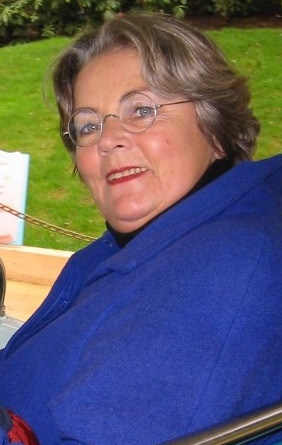
Cilia van Dijk, Best Animated Short Film winner

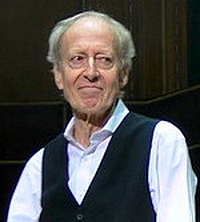
John Barry, Best Original Score winner

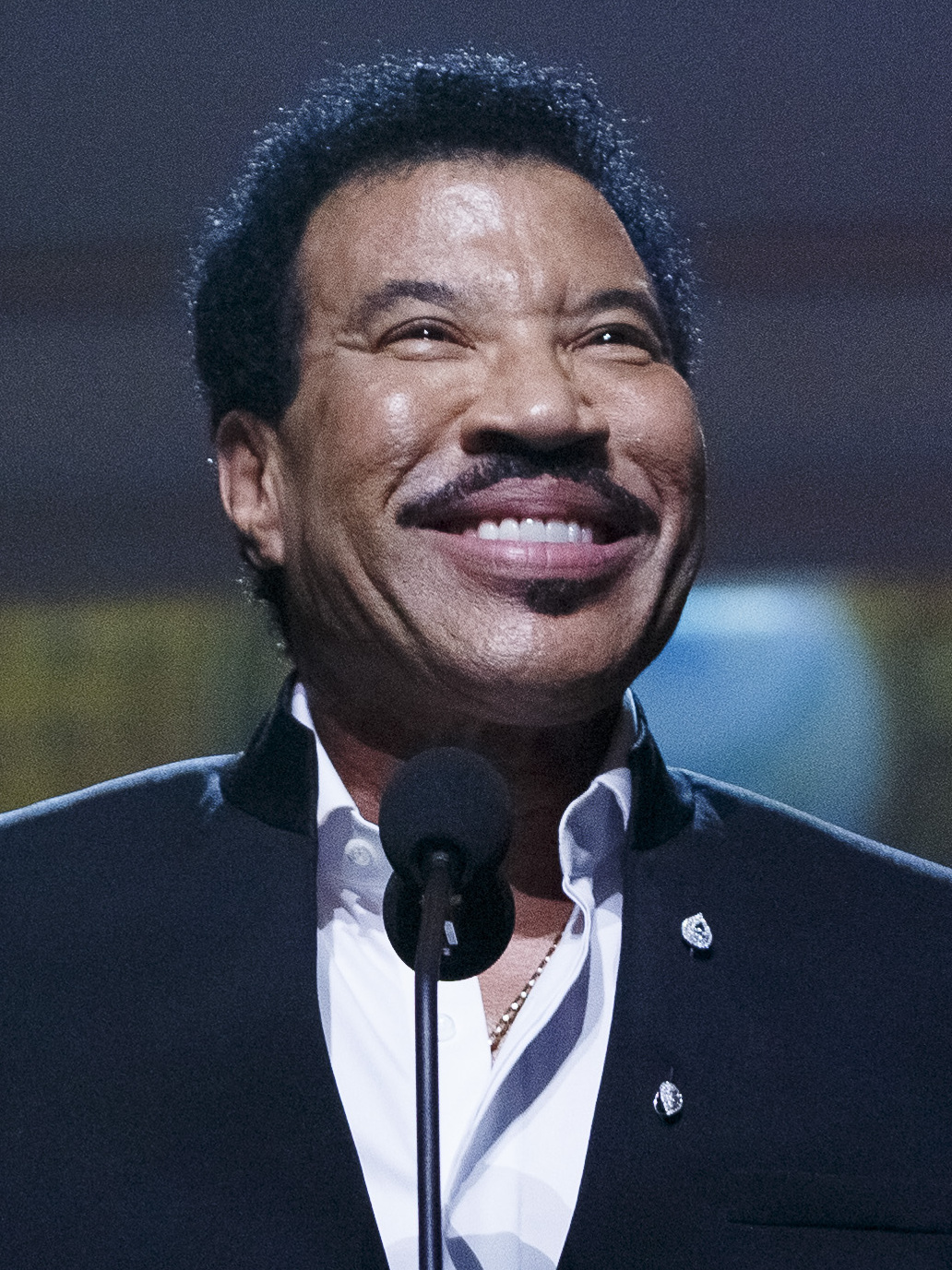
Lionel Richie, Best Original Song winner

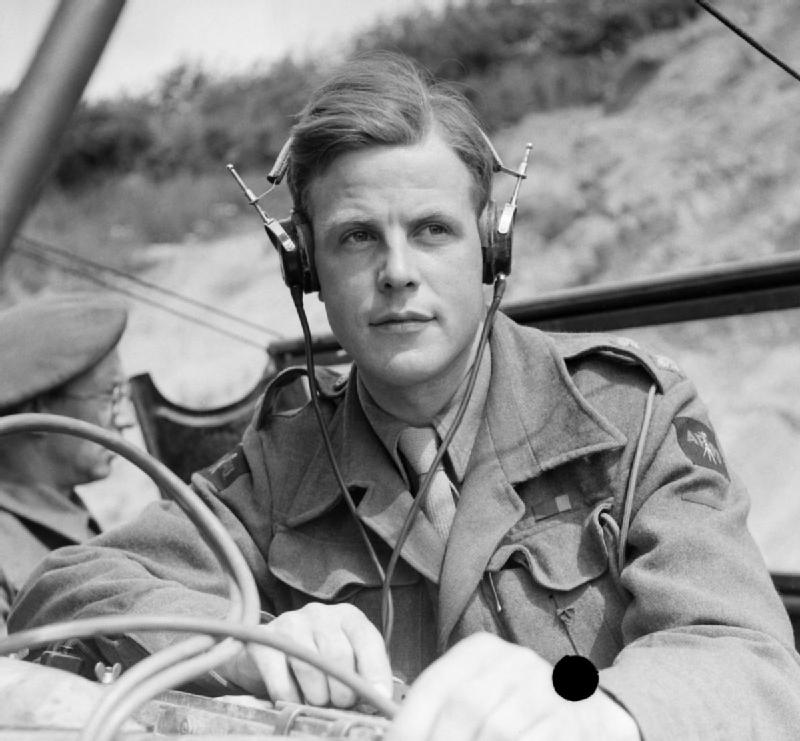
Peter Handford, Best Sound co-winner

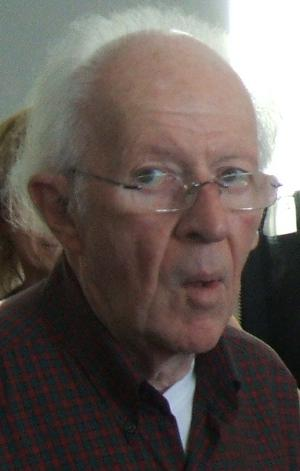
Ralph McQuarrie, Best Visual Effects co-winner

**Best Picture**: **Out of Africa – Sydney Pollack, producer**‡; The Color Purple – Steven Spielberg, Kathleen Kennedy, Frank Marshall and Quincy Jones, producers; Kiss of the Spider Woman – David Weisman, producer; Prizzi's Honor – John Foreman, producer; Witness – Edward S. Feldman, producer	**Best Directing**: **Sydney Pollack – Out of Africa**‡; Héctor Babenco – Kiss of the Spider Woman; John Huston – Prizzi's Honor; Akira Kurosawa – Ran; Peter Weir – Witness
**Best Actor in a Leading Role**: **William Hurt – Kiss of the Spider Woman as Luis Molina**‡; Harrison Ford – Witness as Detective Sergeant John Book; James Garner – Murphy's Romance as Murphy Jones; Jack Nicholson – Prizzi's Honor as Charley Partanna; Jon Voight – Runaway Train as Oscar "Manny" Manheim	**Best Actress in a Leading Role**: **Geraldine Page – The Trip to Bountiful as Carrie Watts**‡; Anne Bancroft – Agnes of God as Miriam Ruth; Whoopi Goldberg – The Color Purple as Celie Harris Johnson; Jessica Lange – Sweet Dreams as Patsy Cline; Meryl Streep – Out of Africa as Karen Blixen
**Best Actor in a Supporting Role**: **Don Ameche – Cocoon as Arthur Selwyn**‡; Klaus Maria Brandauer – Out of Africa as Baron Bror von Blixen-Finecke; William Hickey – Prizzi's Honor as Don Corrado Prizzi; Robert Loggia – Jagged Edge as Sam Ransom; Eric Roberts – Runaway Train as Buck	**Best Actress in a Supporting Role**: **Anjelica Huston – Prizzi's Honor as Maerose Prizzi**‡; Margaret Avery – The Color Purple as Shug Avery; Amy Madigan – Twice in a Lifetime as Sunny Sobel; Meg Tilly – Agnes of God as Sister Agnes; Oprah Winfrey – The Color Purple as Sofia Johnson
**Best Writing (Screenplay Written Directly for the Screen)**: **Witness – Screenplay by Earl W. Wallace and William Kelley; Story by William Kelley, Pamela Wallace and Earl W. Wallace**‡; Back to the Future – Robert Zemeckis and Bob Gale; Brazil – Terry Gilliam, Tom Stoppard and Charles McKeown; The Official Story – Luis Puenzo and Aída Bortnik; The Purple Rose of Cairo – Woody Allen	**Best Writing (Screenplay Based on Material from Another Medium)**: **Out of Africa – Kurt Luedtke based on the memoir by Isak Dinesen and the books Silence Will Speak by Errol Trzebinski and Isak Dinesen: The Life of a Storyteller by Judith Thurman**‡; The Color Purple – Menno Meyjes based on the novel by Alice Walker; Kiss of the Spider Woman – Leonard Schrader based on the novel by Manuel Puig; Prizzi's Honor – Richard Condon and Janet Roach based on the novel by Richard Condon; The Trip to Bountiful – Horton Foote based on his teleplay
**Best Foreign Language Film**: **The Official Story (Argentina) in Spanish – Luis Puenzo**‡; Angry Harvest (Federal Republic of Germany) in German – Agnieszka Holland; Colonel Redl (Hungary) in German – István Szabó; Three Men and a Cradle (France) in French – Coline Serreau; When Father Was Away on Business (Yugoslavia) in Serbo-Croatian – Emir Kusturica	**Best Documentary (Feature)**: **Broken Rainbow – Maria Florio and Victoria Mudd**‡; The Mothers of Plaza de Mayo – Susana Muñoz and Lourdes Portillo; Soldiers in Hiding – Japhet Asher; The Statue of Liberty – Ken Burns and Buddy Squires; Unfinished Business – Steven Okazaki
**Best Documentary (Short Subject)**: **Witness to War: Dr. Charlie Clements – David Goodman**‡; The Courage to Care – Robert H. Gardner; Keats and His Nightingale: A Blind Date – Michael Crowley and James Wolpaw; Making Overtures: The Story of a Community Orchestra – Barbara Willis Sweete; The Wizard of the Strings – Alan Edelstein	**Best Short Film (Live Action)**: **Molly's Pilgrim – Jeffrey D. Brown and Chris Pelzer**‡; Graffiti – Dianna Costello; Rainbow War – Bob Rogers
**Best Short Film (Animated)**: **Anna & Bella – Cilia van Dijk**‡; The Big Snit – Richard Condie and Michael J. F. Scott; Second Class Mail – Alison Snowden	**Best Music (Original Score)**: **Out of Africa – John Barry**‡; Agnes of God – Georges Delerue; The Color Purple – Quincy Jones, Jeremy Lubbock, Rod Temperton, Caiphus Semenya, Andraé Crouch, Chris Boardman, Jorge Calandrelli, Joel Rosenbaum, Fred Steiner, Jack Hayes, Jerry Hey and Randy Kerber; Silverado – Bruce Broughton; Witness – Maurice Jarre
**Best Music (Original Song)**: **"Say You, Say Me" from White Nights – Music and Lyrics by Lionel Richie**‡; "Miss Celie's Blues (Sister)" from The Color Purple – Music by Quincy Jones and Rod Temperton; Lyrics by Quincy Jones, Rod Temperton and Lionel Richie; "The Power of Love" from Back to the Future – Music by Chris Hayes and Johnny Colla; Lyrics by Huey Lewis; "Separate Lives" from White Nights – Music and Lyrics by Stephen Bishop; "Surprise Surprise" from A Chorus Line – Music by Marvin Hamlisch; Lyrics by Edward Kleban	**Best Sound**: **Out of Africa – Chris Jenkins, Gary Alexander, Larry Stensvold and Peter Handford**‡; Back to the Future – Bill Varney, B. Tennyson Sebastian II, Robert Thirlwell and William B. Kaplan; A Chorus Line – Donald O. Mitchell, Michael Minkler, Gerry Humphreys and Christopher Newman; Ladyhawke – Les Fresholtz, Dick Alexander, Vern Poore and Bud Alper; Silverado – Donald O. Mitchell, Rick Kline, Kevin O'Connell and David M. Ronne
**Best Sound Effects Editing**: **Back to the Future – Charles L. Campbell and Robert Rutledge**‡; Ladyhawke – Robert G. Henderson and Alan Robert Murray; Rambo: First Blood Part II – Frederick Brown	**Best Art Direction**: **Out of Africa – Art Direction: Stephen B. Grimes; Set Decoration: Josie MacAvin**‡; Brazil – Art Direction: Norman Garwood; Set Decoration: Maggie Gray; The Color Purple – Art Direction: J. Michael Riva and Robert W. Welch; Set Decoration: Linda DeScenna; Ran – Art Direction and Set Decoration: Yoshirō Muraki and Shinobu Muraki; Witness – Art Direction: Stan Jolley; Set Decoration: John H. Anderson
**Best Cinematography**: **Out of Africa – David Watkin**‡; The Color Purple – Allen Daviau; Murphy's Romance – William A. Fraker; Ran – Takao Saito, Shoji Ueda and Asakazu Nakai; Witness – John Seale	**Best Makeup**: **Mask – Michael Westmore and Zoltan Elek**‡; The Color Purple – Ken Chase; Remo Williams: The Adventure Begins – Carl Fullerton
**Best Costume Design**: **Ran – Emi Wada**‡; The Color Purple – Aggie Guerard Rodgers; The Journey of Natty Gann – Albert Wolsky; Out of Africa – Milena Canonero; Prizzi's Honor – Donfeld	**Best Film Editing**: **Witness – Thom Noble**‡; A Chorus Line – John Bloom; Out of Africa – Fredric Steinkamp, William Steinkamp, Pembroke J. Herring and Sheldon Kahn; Prizzi's Honor – Rudi Fehr and Kaja Fehr; Runaway Train – Henry Richardson
**Best Visual Effects**: **Cocoon – Ken Ralston, Ralph McQuarrie, Scott Farrar and David Berry**‡; Return to Oz – Will Vinton, Ian Wingrove, Zoran Perisic and Michael Lloyd; Young Sherlock Holmes – Dennis Muren, Kit West, John R. Ellis and David W. Allen

=== Honorary Awards ===
- To Paul Newman, in recognition of his many and memorable compelling screen performances and for his personal integrity and dedication to his craft.
- To Alex North, in recognition of his brilliant artistry in the creation of memorable music for a host of distinguished motion pictures.

=== Jean Hersholt Humanitarian Award ===
The award recognizes individuals whose humanitarian efforts have brought credit to the motion picture industry.

- Charles "Buddy" Rogers

=== Multiple nominations and awards ===
Films with multiple nominations
Nominations	Film
11	The Color Purple
11	Out of Africa
8	Prizzi's Honor
8	Witness
4	Back to the Future
4	Kiss of the Spider Woman
4	Ran
3	Agnes of God
3	A Chorus Line
3	Runaway Train
2	Brazil
2	Cocoon
2	Ladyhawke
2	Murphy's Romance
2	The Official Story
2	Silverado
2	The Trip to Bountiful
2	White Nights

Films with multiple wins
Awards	Film
7	Out of Africa
2	Cocoon
2	Witness

== Presenters and performers ==
The following individuals, in order of appearance, presented awards or performed musical numbers.

Presenters
Name(s)	Role
Hank Simms	Announcer of the 58th Academy Awards
Richard Dreyfuss; Marsha Mason	Presenters of the award for Best Supporting Actress
Molly Ringwald	Presenter of the award for Best Visual Effects
Jim Henson; Kermit the Frog; Scooter	Presentation of the award for Best Animated Short Film
Audrey Hepburn	Presenter of the award for Best Costume Design
Louis Gossett Jr.	Presenter of the award for Best Documentary Feature
Teri Garr	Presenter of the award for Best Makeup
Irene Cara	Presenter of the award for Best Sound
Cher	Presenter of the award for Best Supporting Actor
Bob Hope	Presenter of the Jean Hersholt Humanitarian Award to Charles "Buddy" Rogers
Steve Guttenberg; Ally Sheedy	Presenters of the award for Best Documentary Short Subject
Rebecca De Mornay; Michael J. Fox	Presenters of the award for Best Art Direction
Sally Field	Presenter of the Honorary Award to Paul Newman
Michael Winslow	Presenter of the award for Best Sound Effects Editing
Quincy Jones	Presenter of the Honorary Award to Alex North
Jim MacGeorge; Chuck McCann	Presenters of the award for Best Live Action Short Film
F. Murray Abraham	Presenter of the award for Best Actress
Jon Cryer	Presenter of the award for Best Cinematography
Norma Aleandro; Jack Valenti	Presenters of the award for Best Foreign Language Film
Whoopi Goldberg	Presenter of the award for Best Film Editing
Gene Kelly; Donald O'Connor; Debbie Reynolds	Presenters of the awards for Best Original Score and Best Original Song
Larry Gelbart	Presenter of the Best Screenplay Based on Material from Another Medium and Best Screenplay Written Directly for the Screen
Barbra Streisand	Presenter of the award for Best Director
Sally Field	Presenter of the award for Best Actor
John Huston; Akira Kurosawa; Billy Wilder	Presenters of the award for Best Picture

Performers
Name	Role	Performed
Lionel Newman	Musical arranger Conductor	Orchestral
Teri Garr	Performer	"Flying Down to Rio" during the opening number
Irene Cara	Performer	"Here's to the Losers" by Frank Sinatra during the tribute to Oscar losers throughout history
Gregg Burge	Performer	"Surprise, Surprise" from A Chorus Line
Tata Vega	Performer	"Miss Celie's Blues (Sister)" from The Color Purple
Stephen Bishop; Marilyn Martin	Performers	"Separate Lives" from White Nights
Huey Lewis and the News	Performers	"The Power of Love" from Back to the Future
Lionel Richie	Performer	"Say You, Say Me" from White Nights
June Allyson; Leslie Caron; Marge Champion; Cyd Charisse; Kathryn Grayson; Howard Keel; Ann Miller; Jane Powell; Debbie Reynolds; Esther Williams	Performers	"Once a Star, Always a Star" during the Metro-Goldwyn-Mayer musicals tribute
Academy Awards Orchestra	Performers	"Oh, Lady Be Good!" from Lady, Be Good (orchestral) during the closing credits

== Ceremony information ==
Determined to revive interest surrounding the awards and reverse declining ratings, the Academy hired Stanley Donen in December 1985 to produce the telecast for the first time. The following February, actor and comedian Robin Williams was selected as host of the 1986 telecast. Actor Alan Alda and two-time Oscar-winning actress Jane Fonda were later announced to join Williams in sharing emceeing duties.

Several other people were involved with the production of the ceremony. Marty Pasetta was hired as director of the telecast. Lionel Newman served as musical director and conductor for the ceremony. Actress Teri Garr performed the titular song from Flying Down to Rio during the opening segment. Singer Irene Cara sang the Frank Sinatra song "Here's to the Losers" in honor of unsuccessful Oscar nominees throughout history. A song-and-dance number featuring actor and singer Howard Keel and several actresses including Cyd Charisse, Leslie Caron, and Debbie Reynolds paid tribute to Metro-Goldwyn-Mayer musicals.

=== Box office performance of nominated films ===
At the time of the nominations announcement on February 5, the combined gross of the five Best Picture nominees at the US box office was $119 million with an average of $23.9 million. Witness was the highest earner among the Best Picture nominees with $68.7 million in the domestic box office receipts. The film was followed by Out of Africa ($55.6 million), The Color Purple ($46.4 million), Prizzi's Honor ($26.7 million) and Kiss of the Spider Woman ($13.4 million).

Of the 50 grossing films of the year, 42 nominations went to 12 films on the list. Only Back to the Future (1st), Cocoon (4th), Witness (5th), Jagged Edge (20th), The Color Purple (21st), Prizzi's Honor (30th), Agnes of God (32nd) were nominated for Best Picture, directing, acting, or screenplay. The other top 50 box office hits that earned nominations were Rambo: First Blood Part II (2nd), Mask (14th), White Nights (22nd), Silverado (27th), Young Sherlock Holmes (44th), and Ladyhawke (46th).

=== Critical reviews ===
Terrence O'Flaherty of the San Francisco Chronicle wrote, "Last night's sustained-release Oscar pill moved faster through the system than most, but from a standpoint of taste it was the worst in years." Regarding Alda, Fonda, and Williams's hosting performance, he commented, "Together they immediately placed a fatal suggestion in the viewer's mind that there must be a shortage of elegant people in the movie business today." Chicago Tribune film critic Gene Siskel noted that after co-host Williams opened the ceremony with a slew of humorous jokes, "The show regrettably returned to its old bad habits with a boring onstage production number intended to be a tribute to old movies." The Record's Joel Pisetzner remarked, "The program might as well have begun with the announcement 'Dead, from L.A. it's Academy night!' "

Television columnist John J. O'Connor of The New York Times quipped, "Suddenly, it seemed, somebody had listened to the complaints that had grown deadeningly familiar over the years." He also added, "Mr. Williams's improvisational, on-the-precipice style of humor brought the event's comic tone thumpingly into the 1980s." Yardena Arar from the Los Angeles Daily News said, "This time, the ABC telecast didn't drown in the thank yous–or, for that matter, boring presentation speeches and production numbers." Furthermore, she observed, "The writing was by and large brisk, the production numbers fair (in the case of the Oscar-nominated songs) to fabulous (Keel's medley with a bevy of former leading ladies)." Houston Chronicle television critic Ann Hodges remarked, "Oscar 1986 goes into the record books as a very good year–the year the Academy parked the pompous and let the show biz show." She also lauded the winners' acceptance speeches and the various musical numbers during the broadcast.

=== Ratings and reception ===
The American telecast on ABC drew in an average of 37.8 million people over its length, which was a 2% decrease from the previous year's ceremony. Moreover, the show drew lower Nielsen ratings compared to the previous ceremony with 27.3% of households watching with a 43% share. At the time, it earned the lowest viewership for an Academy Award telecast and the lowest ratings for any broadcast.

In July 1986, the ceremony presentation received four nominations at the 38th Primetime Emmys. The following month, the ceremony won one of those nominations for Outstanding Art Direction for a Variety Program (Roy Christopher).

== See also ==
- List of submissions to the 58th Academy Awards for Best Foreign Language Film

== Bibliography ==
- Osborne, Robert (2013). 85 Years of the Oscar: The Complete History of the Academy Awards. New York, New York, United States: Abbeville Publishing Group. ISBN 978-0-7892-1142-2. OCLC 856879222.
- Pond, Steve (2005), The Big Show: High Times and Dirty Dealings Backstage at the Academy Awards, New York, New York, United States: Faber and Faber, ISBN 978-0-5712-1196-8, OCLC 872595912
- Terrance, Vincent (2013). Television Specials: 5,336 Entertainment Programs, 1936–2012 (5 ed.). Jefferson, North Carolina, United States: Ballantine Books, McFarland & Company. ISBN 978-1-4766-1240-9. OCLC 844373010.
- Wiley, Mason; Bona, Damien (1996), Inside Oscar: The Unofficial History of the Academy Awards (5 ed.), New York, New York, United States: Ballantine Books, ISBN 978-0-3454-0053-6, OCLC 779680732
