= Edgar Allan Poe Award for Best Motion Picture Screenplay =

The following is a list of Edgar Allan Poe Award for Best Motion Picture, one of the Edgar Awards awarded to authors and others by the Mystery Writers of America. The "Best Motion Picture" award was first presented in 1946 and was discontinued after 2009.

== Winners ==
=== 1940s ===
Year	Writer(s)	Title
1946	John Paxton	Murder, My Sweet
1947	Anthony Veiller	The Killers
1948	John Paxton	Crossfire
1949	Jerome Cady, Jay Dratler, Leonard Hoffman, and Quentin Reynolds	Call Northside 777

=== 1950s ===
Year	Writer(s)	Title
1950	Mel Dinelli and Cornell Woolrich	The Window
1951	Ben Maddow	The Asphalt Jungle
1952	Michael Wilson	Detective Story
1953	Michael Wilson and Otto Lang	Five Fingers
1954	Sydney Boehm	The Big Heat
1955	John Michael Hayes	Rear Window
1956	Joseph Hayes	The Desperate Hours
1957	No Award Presented	
1958	Reginald Rose	12 Angry Men
1959	Nathan E. Douglas and Harold Jacob Smith	The Defiant Ones

=== 1960s ===
Year	Writer(s)	Title
1960	Ernest Lehman	North By Northwest
1961	Joseph Stefano	Psycho
1962	William Archibald and Truman Capote	The Innocents
1963	No Award Presented	
1964	Peter Stone	Charade
1965	Henry Farrell and Lukas Heller	Hush, Hush, Sweet Charlotte
1966	Paul Dehn and Guy Trosper	The Spy Who Came In From the Cold
1967	William Goldman	Harper
1968	Stirling Silliphant	In The Heat of the Night
1969	Harry Kleiner and Alan Trustman	Bullitt

=== 1970s ===
Year	Writer(s)	Title
1970	Costa Gavras and Jorge Semprún	Z
1971	Elio Petri and Ugo Pirro	Investigation of a Citizen Above Suspicion
1972	Ernest Tidyman	The French Connection
1973	Anthony Shaffer	Sleuth
1974	Anthony Perkins and Stephen Sondheim	The Last of Sheila
1975	Robert Towne	Chinatown
1976	David Rayfiel and Lorenzo Semple, Jr.	Three Days of the Condor
1977	Ernest Lehman	Family Plot
1978	Robert Benton	The Late Show
1979	William Goldman	Magic

=== 1980s ===
Year	Writer(s)	Title
1980	Michael Crichton	The Great Train Robbery
1981	Joseph Wambaugh	The Black Marble
1982	Jeffrey Alan Fiskin	Cutter's Way
1983	Barrie Keeffe	The Long Good Friday
1984	Dennis Potter	Gorky Park
1985	Charles Fuller	A Soldier's Story
1986	William Kelley and Earl W. Wallace	Witness
1987	E. Max Frye	Something Wild
1988	Jim Kouf	Stakeout
1989	Errol Morris	The Thin Blue Line

=== 1990s ===
Year	Writer(s)	Title
1990	Daniel Waters	Heathers
1991	Donald E. Westlake	The Grifters
1992	Ted Tally	The Silence of the Lambs
1993	Michael Tolkin	The Player
1994	Ebbe Roe Smith	Falling Down
1995	Quentin Tarantino	Pulp Fiction
1996	Christopher McQuarrie	The Usual Suspects
1997	Billy Bob Thornton	Sling Blade
1998	Curtis Hanson and Brian Helgeland	L.A. Confidential
1999	Scott Frank (screenplay) Elmore Leonard (novel)	Out of Sight

=== 2000s ===
Year	Writer(s)	Title	Ref.
2000	Guy Ritchie (screenplay)	Lock, Stock and Two Smoking Barrels	
2001	Stephen Gaghan (screenplay) Simon Moore (original mini-series)	Traffic	
2002	Christopher Nolan	Memento	
2003	Bill Condon	Chicago	
2004	Steven Knight	Dirty Pretty Things	
2005	Jean-Pierre Jeunet (screenplay) Sébastien Japrisot (novel)	A Very Long Engagement	
2006	Stephen Gaghan (screenplay) Robert Baer (book)	Syriana	
2007	William Monahan	The Departed	
2008	Tony Gilroy	Michael Clayton	
2009	Martin McDonagh	In Bruges	

== See also ==
- Category:Edgar Award winners
- Category:Edgar Award–winning works
