= Ransom (Garwood novel) =

Romance novel

- First edition
- Author: Julie Garwood
- Language: English
- Genre: Romance
- Published: 1999 (Pocket Books)
- Publication place: USA

Ransom, is the second in the series of three historical romance novels by American author Julie Garwood. It was published in 1999 by Pocket Books. It is a New York Times bestselling novel that is based in England and Scotland in the days after the death of Richard the Lionhearted. In her novel, Garwood includes characters who demonstrate the characteristics of passion, loyalty, justice and honor

== Plot summary ==
In England, during the reign of King Richard I, Gillian, as a young child, is woken up in the middle of the night by her father. Alford the Red, and his soldiers have breached their home, Dunhanshire. Gillian's father sends his daughters with four of his most trusted men to escape the estate with a golden jeweled box that must be kept a secret. In the chaos, Gillian and Christian are separated. Christian escapes but Gillian gets caught and dragged back to the holding. After seizing Dunhanshire and killing Gillian's father, Alford has Gillian banished to her uncle, Morgan Chapman's, estate.

Fourteen years later, Gillian is dragged back to Dunhanshire where she meets a young 5-year-old boy, Alec Maitland. She tries to help him escape but the first attempt fails and they were found and taken back to the estate. Alford tells Gillian that he is sending her on a quest to the Highlands in Scotland to retrieve the jeweled box, called Arianna's treasure which belongs to King John, and her sister who he believes has the box. Gillian leaves the holding once again with Alec in order to save his life.

Once in Scotland, Gillian sends word to Alec's champion, Laird Brodick Buchanan, to request his help in getting Alec returned home safely. Gillian meets with Alec's father, Laird Iain Maitland, and Laird Ramsey who, along with Brodick, demand Gillian to give them the names of the English barons so they can retaliate against them for kidnapping Alec, but Gillian refuses in order to protect her uncle who is being held captive by Alford until Gillian returns to England with the box and her sister.

Gillian, Brodick and Ramsey travel to Ramsey's holding so that Gillian can spot the traitor and find her sister since Ramsey rules over both the Sinclair and MacPherson clans, but her search is unsuccessful. Two MacPherson elder's do locate Christian but she refuses to meet with Gillian. Brodick once again demands Gillian to give him the names of the Englishmen and Gillian decides to give him their names but only after Brodick promises to wait to retaliate until after she has completed her quest.

Gillian finally spots the traitorous Highlander, Ramsey's first commander, Gideon. Ramsey forces Gillian's sister to have a meeting with her where Gillian discovers that Christian does not know where Arianna's box is located. Ramsey and Brodick leave to meet up with Iain and their soldiers to travel to England and get their revenge. Upon hearing this, Gillian immediately packs and heads her own way to England. Gillian has an epiphany about where the box may be located and sends a message to King John that she knows where Arianna's treasure is hidden.

== Primary characters ==
- Lady Gillian is the female protagonist and heroine of the story. She was born in Dunhanshire, England and raised by her Uncle Morgan Chapman. She is beautiful, kind, courageous and strong-willed lady who will do everything in her power to do what she believes is right and proper. She falls in love with Brodick Buchanan and ends up, unknowingly, married to him.
- Baron Alford the Red of Lockmiere is the antagonist in the story and one of King John's most trusted advisors. He is the one to introduce King John to Arianna and because of this, King John always protects and forgives him. His nickname comes from his red hair and his temperament. He wants to find the jeweled box before King John or anyone else does and believes Gillian and her family knows exactly where it is.
- Laird Brodick Buchanan is the male protagonist in the novel. He is a handsome, muscular and fierce Scottish warrior and chieftain who was taught by Iain Maitland to become a leader. He is stubborn and quick to anger but also a fair and honorable man. He is also Alec Maitland's champion and aids Gillian on her journey through Scotland. He cares for Gillian deeply and tricks her into marrying him.
- Laird Ramsey Sinclair is another handsome Scottish chieftain who was also trained by Iain Maitland to become a leader. He is able to control and mask his emotions better than Brodick or Iain. He is diplomatic and reputed to lead with kindness, but once pushed to his limit, he can be a ruthless warrior. Ramsey struggles with his duty as a laird, to marrying a MacPherson in order to join his clan and the MacPherson clan by marriage, and his increasing admiration of Bridgid KirkConnell.
- Bridgid KirkConnell is a member of Ramsey Sinclair's clan. Ramsey's father promised her father on his deathbed that Bridgid would be allowed to decide who she would marry. Several men have requested her hand but she has refused all of them because she doesn't love any of them. She vows she will only marry the man she loves, but she won't tell Ramsey who that is.

== Historical references ==
=== Time period ===
Early in the story, it references to the time period it is in by mentioning the names of the rulers of England at that time. In the first chapter of the novel, it mentions King Richard I, or Richard the Lionhearted. The next chapter explains a jump in time fourteen year later where it then mentions King John rules over England. The novel also mentions King John's dispute with Pope Innocent III over who would be the next Archbishop of Canterbury which occurred in the year 1205 and the interdict that the Pope placed on England which happened to be in the year 1207. The uprising of England's barons is also mentioned in the novel when the story notes how the barons in England were feuding amongst one another due to some barons' loyalty and others' disloyalty to King John due to his actions as king. These references are concurrent with England's history around the year 1194 (when King Richard returned to England after being imprisoned in Rome) through 1209 (when the Pope excommunicated King John).

=== Clans ===
Among others, there are four main Highland clans of Scotland that the novel focuses on. The first is the Maitlands. The second is the Sinclairs. The third clan is the MacPhersons. The fourth and final clan is the Buchanans. Although these are historic Scottish clans, their histories do not correlate with the history within the novel.
