= Witness (1985 film) =

1985 film directed by Peter Weir

- Theatrical release poster
- Directed by: Peter Weir
- Screenplay by: Earl W. Wallace; William Kelley
- Story by: William Kelley; Pamela Wallace; Earl W. Wallace
- Produced by: Edward S. Feldman
- Starring: Harrison Ford
- Cinematography: John Seale
- Edited by: Thom Noble
- Music by: Maurice Jarre
- Production companies: Edward S. Feldman Productions; Paramount Pictures
- Distributed by: Paramount Pictures
- Release date: February 8, 1985
- Running time: 112 minutes
- Country: United States
- Language: English
- Budget: $12 million
- Box office: $117.1 million

Witness is a 1985 American neo-noir crime thriller film directed by Peter Weir, from a screenplay by Earl W. Wallace and William Kelley. It stars Harrison Ford as a police detective protecting an Amish woman (Kelly McGillis) and her son (Lukas Haas), who becomes a target after he witnesses a brutal murder in a Philadelphia railroad station.

The film was based on scripts that Wallace and Kelley had written for the Western television series How the West Was Won and Gunsmoke years prior. Filming took place in Lancaster County and Philadelphia, Pennsylvania. Due to the Amish prescription against being photographed, most of the shooting took place against the backdrop of the local Mennonite community instead. The cast also features Josef Sommer, Jan Rubeš, Alexander Godunov, Danny Glover, Patti LuPone, and Viggo Mortensen in his film debut.

Witness was released theatrically by Paramount Pictures on February 8, 1985. It received positive reviews upon release and became a sleeper hit, grossing over $117.1 million worldwide. It earned eight nominations at the 58th Academy Awards, including Best Picture, Best Director and Best Actor for Ford; winning Best Original Screenplay and Best Film Editing. It also won a BAFTA Award for Best Original Music (for Maurice Jarre) and was nominated for six Golden Globe Awards.

== Plot ==
In an Amish community outside Lancaster, Pennsylvania, friends and family attend the funeral of Jacob Lapp. His widow Rachel and eight-year-old son Samuel travel by train to visit Rachel's sister. While they wait for a connecting train at the 30th Street Station in Philadelphia, Samuel goes into the men's room and witnesses the murder of undercover police officer Zenovich.

Philadelphia Police Detective John Book and his partner Sergeant Elton Carter question Samuel, who is unable to identify the perpetrator from mugshots or a lineup. Samuel then sees a newspaper clipping in a trophy case of narcotics officer Lieutenant James McFee and points him out to Book as the murderer.

Book discovers McFee was previously responsible for a seizure of phenylacetone (used to make black-market amphetamine) worth 22 million dollars, which later disappeared from police storage. Book surmises that McFee sold the chemicals back to drug dealers, and Zenovich was investigating. Book expresses his suspicions to Chief Paul Schaeffer, who advises Book to keep the case secret until they can determine how to proceed. Book is later ambushed in his apartment parking garage by McFee, who shoots and wounds him before fleeing. Since he had told nobody else about his suspicions, Book realizes that Schaeffer is in league with McFee.

Knowing that Samuel and Rachel are now in danger, Book orders Carter to hide their police files. He then drives them back to their farm. While beginning his drive back to Philadelphia, he passes out from his wound and crashes into their birdhouse. Rachel insists that he be taken to a hospital, but Book refuses and states that going there would allow him and, by extension, them to be found. Rachel's father-in-law, Eli, reluctantly agrees to shelter Book.

Book recovers in their care and begins to blend into the Amish community and lifestyle. He and Rachel develop feelings for each other, which becomes a source of friction for Daniel Hochleitner (a neighbor who had hoped to court Rachel after her husband's death). Book's relationship with the Amish community deepens as they learn that he is skilled at carpentry and seems like a decent, hard-working man. He is invited to participate in a barn raising for a newly-married couple, gaining Hochleitner's respect. However, the attraction between Book and Rachel is evident and causes gossip in the tight-knit community.

Meanwhile, Schaeffer searches for Book by contacting authorities in the Amish area. However, since Amish communities have no modern means of communication and little contact with the outside world, he hits repeated dead ends.

Book goes to Strasburg with Eli and the Hochleitner brothers to use a payphone to call his precinct, and learns that Carter was killed in the line of duty. Realizing that Schaeffer was behind it, Book calls him at his home (where the call cannot be traced), excoriates him for being corrupt and threatens to kill him. As they leave town, a group of tourists harass the Amish. Book retaliates, breaking with the Amish tradition of non-violence and upsetting Eli. The assault is reported to the local police, and word eventually gets back to Schaeffer.

After returning from Strasburg, Eli tells Rachel that Book is due to leave early the next morning. Rachel approaches Book in a field, where they passionately embrace, finally acting on their feelings. The following morning, Schaeffer, McFee and their accomplice Sergeant Leon "Fergie" Ferguson arrive at the Lapp farm and take Rachel and Eli hostage. Eli manages to alert Book, who tells Samuel to hide at Hochleitner's farm. Book tricks Fergie into the corn silo and suffocates him under tons of corn, then uses Fergie's shotgun to kill McFee. Schaeffer holds Rachel and Eli at gunpoint, but Samuel secretly comes back to ring the Lapp farm's bell. Book confronts Schaeffer, who threatens to kill Rachel, but the bell has alerted and summoned all of the neighbors. With so many witnesses present, Schaeffer surrenders and is later arrested.

With Rachel and Samuel no longer in danger, Book departs for Philadelphia, bidding farewell. Before he drives off, Eli wishes Book well by saying, "You be careful out there among them English (Note: The exonym often used by the Amish to refer to outsiders),” indicating acceptance as a member of their community.

== Cast ==
- Harrison Ford as Det. John Book
- Kelly McGillis as Rachel Lapp
- Josef Sommer as Chief Paul Schaeffer
- Lukas Haas as Samuel Lapp
- Jan Rubeš as Eli Lapp
- Alexander Godunov as Daniel Hochleitner
- Danny Glover as Lt. James McFee
- Brent Jennings as Sgt. Elton Carter
- Patti LuPone as Elaine Book
- Angus MacInnes as Sgt. Leon "Fergie" Ferguson
- Viggo Mortensen as Moses Hochleitner
- Frederick Rolf as Stoltzfus
- John Garson as Bishop Tchantz
- Beverly May as Mrs. Yoder
- Timothy Carhart as Det. Zenovich
- Richard Chaves as Det. Sykes
- Robert Earl Jones as Harry

Credits from the AFI Catalog of Feature Films. (Note: The end credits does not list the full name of several characters including Rachel, Schaeffer, Samuel, McFee, Carter, Elaine, Fergie, Zenovich, etc.)

== Themes ==
In his book The Amish in the American Imagination (2001), scholar David Weaver-Zercher notes that Witness is primarily concerned with the intersection of contrasting cultures, a recurring theme in several of Weir's films, including The Last Wave (1977) and The Year of Living Dangerously (1982). Weaver-Zercher notes that the conflict between Amish and non-Amish as depicted in Witness "reflect[s] well on the Amish ways" and also serves as a redemption story for Captain Book, who regains a new sense of humanity during his displacement in the Amish community.

== Production ==
=== Development ===
Producer Edward S. Feldman, who was in a "first-look" development deal with 20th Century Fox at the time, first received the screenplay for Witness in 1983. Originally titled Called Home, which is the Amish term for death, it ran for 182 pages, the equivalent of three hours of screen time. The script, which had been circulating in Hollywood for several years, began with an idea by novelist Pamela Wallace for a novel about an Amish woman who witnesses a murder in Los Angeles. Earl W. Wallace, who wrote for the television Western How the West Was Won recalled an episode with a similar plot and contacted its writer, William Kelley. Kelley had reworked the plot for the show from a script he had written for a 1972 episode of Gunsmoke. Earl Wallace and Kelley wrote the original screenplay together.

Feldman liked the concept, but felt too much of the script was devoted to Amish traditions, diluting the thriller aspects of the story. He offered Kelley and Wallace $25,000 for a one-year option and one rewrite, and an additional $225,000 if the film actually were made. They submitted the revised screenplay in less than six weeks, and Feldman delivered it to Fox. Joe Wizan, the studio's head of production, rejected it with the statement that Fox did not make "rural movies".

Feldman sent the screenplay to Harrison Ford's agent Phil Gersh, who contacted the producer four days later and advised him his client was willing to commit to the film. Certain the attachment of a major star would change Wizan's mind, Feldman approached him once again, but Wizan insisted that as much as the studio liked Ford, they still were not interested in making a "rural movie".

Feldman sent the screenplay to numerous studios, and was rejected by all of them, until Paramount Pictures finally expressed interest. Feldman's first choice of director was Peter Weir, but he was involved in preproduction work for The Mosquito Coast and passed on the project. John Badham dismissed it as "just another cop movie", and others Feldman approached either were committed to other projects or had no interest. Then, as financial backing for The Mosquito Coast fell through, Weir became free to direct Witness, which was his first American film. Starting the film immediately was imperative, because a Directors Guild of America (DGA) strike was looming. David Cronenberg was offered the role of director, but declined as he "could never be a fan of the Amish".

=== Casting ===
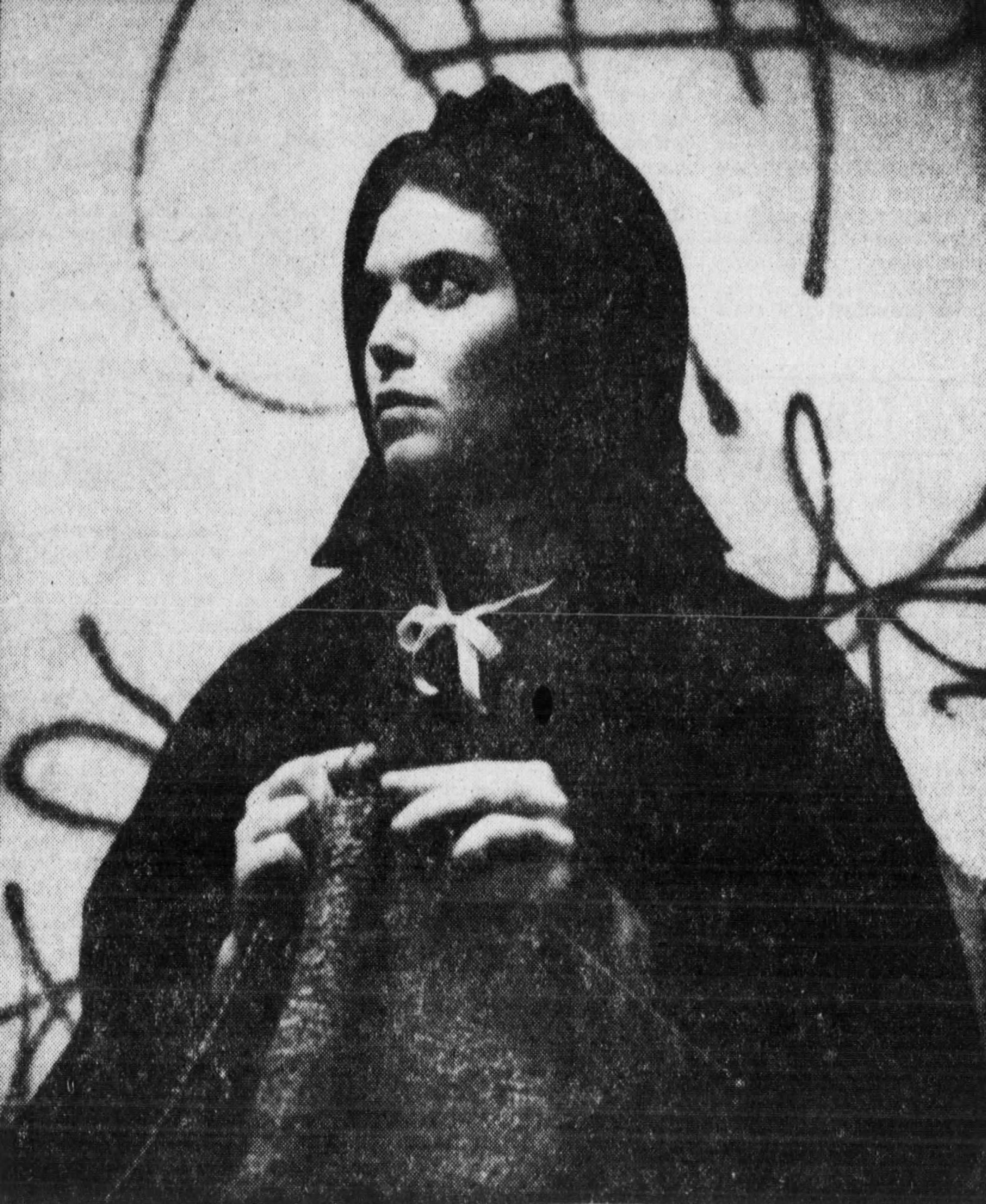
McGillis on the set of Witness in 1984

Lynne Littman had originally been in talks to direct the film, and though she ultimately did not, she recommended Lukas Haas for the part of Samuel, because she had recently worked with him on her film Testament. The role of Rachel was the most difficult to cast, and after Weir grew frustrated with the auditions he had seen, he asked the casting director to look for actors in Italy, because he thought they would be more "womanly". As they were reviewing audition tapes from Italy, Kelly McGillis came to audition, and the moment she put on the bonnet and spoke a few lines, Weir knew she was the one. The casting director recommended her old friend Alexander Godunov, who had never acted before, but she thought his personality would be right, and Weir agreed.

Viggo Mortensen was cast in a small role as Daniel Hochleitner's brother Moses, because Weir thought he had the right face for the part of an Amish man. Mortensen had just started his acting career, so this was his first film acting role, and he had to turn down another role as a soldier in Shakespeare in the Park's production of Henry V. He credited that decision and the very positive experience on the film as the start of his film career.

=== Pre-production ===
During the weeks before filming, Ford spent time with the homicide department of the Philadelphia Police Department, researching the important details of working as a homicide detective. McGillis did research by moving in with an Amish widow and her seven children, learning how to milk cows and practicing their Pennsylvania German dialect.

Weir and cinematographer John Seale went on a trip to the Philadelphia Museum of Art, which was running an exhibition of 17th-century Dutch Masters. Weir drew attention to the paintings of Johannes Vermeer, which were used as inspiration for the lighting and composition of the film, especially in the scenes where John Book is recovering from a gunshot wound in Rachel's house.

=== Filming ===
Principal photography took place between April 27, 1984 and June 29, 1984. The film was shot on location in Philadelphia and the city and towns of Intercourse, Lancaster, Strasburg, and Parkesburg. Many Amish were unhappy about the film. Local Amish were willing to work as carpenters and electricians, but declined to appear on film, so many of the extras were actually Mennonites. Many Amish refused to rent their farms out to Paramount for filming as they felt it was in conflict with their way of life. Amish bishops advised their followers to not appear in the film or rent their land to the film makers. Halfway through filming, the title was changed from Called Home to Witness at the behest of Paramount's marketing department, which felt the original title posed too much of a promotional challenge. Principal photography was completed three days before the scheduled DGA strike, which ultimately failed to materialize.

During the set-up and rehearsal of each scene, as well as during dailies, Weir would play music to set the mood, with the idea that it prevented the actors from thinking too much and let them listen to their other instincts. The barn-raising scene was only a short paragraph in the script, but Weir thought it was important to highlight that aspect of Amish community life. They shot the scene in a day and did, in fact, build a barn, albeit with the aid of cranes off-camera. To film the scene in the corn silo, corn was actually dropped onto the actor, while a scuba diving regulator with a compressed air tank was hidden on the floor so the actor would be able to breathe.

Originally, the script contained a scene of Book and Rachel each explaining their feelings for each other to the audience, but Weir felt the scene was unnecessary and decided not to shoot it. The studio executives were concerned that the audience would not understand the conclusion, and tried to convince him otherwise, but Weir insisted that the characters' emotions could be expressed only with visuals. The scene where they finally embrace after Book returns from Strasburg was immediately followed by a sexual consummation of their relationship in the original script, but this is left ambiguous in the film and only their kiss is shown onscreen.

== Release ==
Witness had its world premiere at the Fulton Opera House in Lancaster, Pennsylvania in on February 7, 1985. The film was screened out of competition at the 1985 Cannes Film Festival.

=== Home media ===
Paramount Home Entertainment released Witness on VHS, with a DVD in initially in 1999 and then in 2005, along with a Blu-ray Disc in 2015.

British boutique label Arrow Films released the film in the United States on 4K Ultra HD disc and remastered Blu-ray on October 31, 2023.

== Reception ==
=== Box office ===
The film opened theatrically in 876 theaters in the United States on February 8, 1985, and grossed $4,539,990 in its opening weekend, ranking number two behind Beverly Hills Cop. The film went on to become a sleeper hit, topping the charts in its fifth week of release. It eventually earned a total of $68,706,993 in North America. Internationally, it grossed $47.4 million for a worldwide total of $116.1 million.

=== Critical response ===
Witness received critical acclaim, with particular praise towards Ford's performance. Roger Ebert of the Chicago Sun-Times rated the film four out of four stars, calling it:

[F]irst of all, an electrifying and poignant love story. Then it is a movie about the choices we make in life and the choices that other people make for us. Only then is it a thriller—one that Alfred Hitchcock would have been proud to make... We have lately been getting so many pallid, bloodless little movies—mostly recycled teenage exploitation films made by ambitious young stylists without a thought in their heads—that Witness arrives like a fresh new day. It is a movie about adults whose lives have dignity and whose choices matter to them. And it is also one hell of a thriller.

Ebert also praised Ford's work and believed he had "never given a better performance in a movie."

Vincent Canby of The New York Times was much more negative, saying of the film:

It's not really awful, but it's not much fun. It's pretty to look at and it contains a number of good performances, but there is something exhausting about its neat balancing of opposing manners and values... One might be made to care about all this if the direction by the talented Australian film maker, Peter Weir... were less perfunctory and if the screenplay... did not seem so strangely familiar. One follows Witness as if touring one's old hometown, guided by an outsider who refuses to believe that one knows the territory better than he does. There's not a character, an event, or a plot twist that one hasn't anticipated long before its arrival, which gives one the feeling of waiting around for people who are always late.

Variety said the film was "at times a gentle, affecting story of star-crossed lovers limited within the fascinating Amish community. Too often, however, this fragile romance is crushed by a thoroughly absurd shoot-'em-up, like ketchup poured over a delicate Pennsylvania Dutch dinner."

Time Out New York observed, "Powerful, assured, full of beautiful imagery and thankfully devoid of easy moralizing, it also offers a performance of surprising skill and sensitivity from Ford."

Halliwell's Film Guide chose Witness as one of only two films from 1985 to receive a four-star review, describing it as "one of those lucky movies which works out well on all counts and shows that there are still craftsmen lurking in Hollywood."

Radio Times called the film "partly a love story and partly a thriller, but mainly a study of cultural collision – it's as if the world of Dirty Harry had suddenly stumbled into a canvas by Brueghel." It added, "[I]t's Weir's delicacy of touch that impresses the most. He ably juggles the various elements of the story and makes the violence seem even more shocking when it's played out on the fields of Amish denial."

On Rotten Tomatoes the film scores 92% based on 49 reviews. The site's consensus reads, "A wonderfully entertaining thriller within an unusual setting, with Harrison Ford delivering a surprisingly emotive and sympathetic performance." Its Metacritic score is 76 out of 100 based on 14 critics.

In 2006, Writers Guild of America West ranked its screenplay 80th in WGA’s list of 101 Greatest Screenplays.

=== Accolades ===
Award	Category	Recipient	Result	Ref.
Academy Awards	Best Picture	Edward S. Feldman	Nominated	
Academy Awards	Best Director	Peter Weir	Nominated	
Academy Awards	Best Actor	Harrison Ford	Nominated	
Academy Awards	Best Original Screenplay	Earl W. Wallace, William Kelley, Pamela Wallace	Won	
Academy Awards	Best Art Direction	Stan Jolley, John H. Anderson	Nominated	
Academy Awards	Best Cinematography	John Seale	Nominated	
Academy Awards	Best Film Editing	Thom Noble	Won	
Academy Awards	Best Original Score	Maurice Jarre	Nominated	
BAFTA Awards	Best Film		Nominated	
BAFTA Awards	Best Original Screenplay	Earl W. Wallace, William Kelley, Pamela Wallace	Nominated	
BAFTA Awards	Best Actor	Harrison Ford	Nominated	
BAFTA Awards	Best Actress	Kelly McGillis	Nominated	
BAFTA Awards	Best Music	Maurice Jarre	Won	
BAFTA Awards	Best Cinematography	John Seale	Nominated	
BAFTA Awards	Best Editing	Thom Noble	Nominated	
Golden Globe Awards	Best Motion Picture – Drama		Nominated	
Golden Globe Awards	Best Director	Peter Weir	Nominated	
Golden Globe Awards	Best Screenplay	Earl W. Wallace, William Kelley, Pamela Wallace	Nominated	
Golden Globe Awards	Best Actor – Motion Picture Drama	Harrison Ford	Nominated	
Golden Globe Awards	Best Supporting Actress	Kelly McGillis	Nominated	
Golden Globe Awards	Best Original Score	Maurice Jarre	Nominated	
Kansas City Film Critics Circle	Best Film		Won	
Kansas City Film Critics Circle	Best Actor	Harrison Ford	Won	
Writers Guild of America	Best Original Screenplay	Earl W. Wallace, William Kelley, Pamela Wallace	Won	
Directors Guild of America	Outstanding Directing	Peter Weir	Nominated	
Grammy Awards	Best Score	Maurice Jarre	Nominated	
American Cinema Editors	Best Edited Feature Film	Thom Noble	Won	
Australian Cinematographers Society	Cinematographer of the Year	John Seale	Won	
British Society of Cinematographers	Best Cinematography	John Seale	Nominated	

=== Controversy ===
Leading up to and following its release, Witness was met with controversy from the Amish communities where it was filmed, and was subject to debate from editors, scholars, and other parties regarding its depiction of the Amish. Some accused the film of exploiting the Amish community for commercial purposes, while others felt that the depiction of Amish characters in an R-rated film was insensitive to the Amish's beliefs.

A statement released by a law firm associated with the Amish claimed that their portrayal in the movie was not accurate. The National Committee for Amish Religious Freedom called for a boycott of the movie soon after its release, citing fears that these communities were being "overrun by tourists" as a result of the popularity of the movie, and worried that "the crowding, souvenir-hunting, photographing and trespassing on Amish farmsteads will increase." After the movie was completed, Pennsylvania governor Dick Thornburgh agreed not to promote Amish communities as future film sites. A similar concern was voiced within the movie itself, where Rachel tells a recovering Book that tourists often consider her fellow Amish something to stare at, with some even being so rude as to trespass on their private property.

No major film has been shot in Lancaster County since Witness.

== Legacy ==
Negotiation expert William Ury summarised the film's climactic scene in a chapter titled "The Witness" in his 1999 book Getting to Peace (later republished with the alternative title The Third Side: Why We Fight and How We Can Stop) and used the scene as a symbol of the power of ordinary citizens to resolve conflicts and stop violence.

This scene from the popular movie Witness captures the power of ordinary community members to contain violence. The Amish farmers were present as the third side in perhaps its most elemental form, seemingly doing nothing, but in fact playing the critical role of Witness. Like the Amish, we are all potential Witnesses.

— William Ury, The Third Side

Japanese filmmaker Akira Kurosawa cited Witness as one of his favorite films of all time.

The film did cause an increase in tourism in the Lancaster area.

== Sources ==
- Feldman, Edward S. (2005). Tell Me How You Love the Picture. New York: St. Martin's Press. ISBN 978-0-312-34801-4.
- Silver, Alain; Ward, Elizabeth, eds. (1992). Film Noir: An Encyclopedic Reference to the American Style (3rd ed.). Woodstock, New York: The Overlook Press. ISBN 978-0-879-51479-2.
- Hostetler, John A.; Kraybill, Donald B. (1988). "Hollywood markets the Amish". In Gross, Larry P.; Katz, John Stuart; Ruby, Jay (eds.). Image Ethics: The Moral Rights of Subjects In Photographs, Film, and Television. Communication and Society. Oxford; New York: Oxford University Press. ISBN 978-0-195-36184-1.
- McGivern, Alicia (March 2020). "Witness: A Study Guide" (PDF). IFI Education. Irish Film Institute. Archived (PDF) from the original on May 27, 2021.
- Ury, William (2000) [1999]. The Third Side: Why We Fight and How We Can Stop (Revised ed.). New York: Penguin Books. ISBN 978-0-140-29634-1.
- Weaver-Zercher, David (2001). The Amish in the American Imagination. Baltimore: JHU Press. ISBN 978-0-801-86681-4.
- Rodley, Chris, ed. (1997). Cronenberg on Cronenberg. Faber and Faber. ISBN 0571191371.
