= Rose Hill (film) =

1997 TV film

- Television release poster
- Screenplay by: Earl W. Wallace
- Directed by: Christopher Cain
- Starring: Jennifer Garner; Jeffrey D. Sams; Zak Orth; Vera Farmiga; Justin Chambers
- Music by: Steve Dorff
- Original language: English

Production
- Producers: Andrew Gottlieb; Brent Shields; Richard Welsh
- Cinematography: Willy Kurant
- Editor: Sabrina Plisco
- Running time: 99 minutes
- Production companies: Sonar Entertainment; Boy Next Door Productions

Original release
- Network: CBS
- Release: April 20, 1997

Rose Hill is a 1997 American Western television film, directed by Christopher Cain and written by Earl W. Wallace. The film stars Jennifer Garner, Jeffrey D. Sams, Vera Farmiga, Justin Chambers, and Zak Orth. It is based on Julie Garwood's 1995 novel For the Roses. The film premiered on CBS on April 20, 1997.

== Plot ==
Four Boston street urchins adopt a young infant that they discovered in a wagon when they made their escape from the police. They named the baby girl Mary Rose. As they grow up together, the five eventually settle in Blue Belle, Montana. In Blue Belle, Mary Rose and her four brothers (Adam, Cole, Douglas, and Travis) have a free-range cattle farm by the name of Rose Hill near a lake. There, Mary Rose grows up and longs to find her real family, as well as learn about her true identity.

== Cast ==
- Jennifer Garner as Mary Rose Clayborne/ Victoria Elliott.
  - Courtney Chase as Young Mary Rose
- Casey Siemaszko as Fergus Carroll
- Jeffrey D. Sams as Adam Clayborne
  - Michael Alexander Jackson as Young Adam
- Justin Chambers as Cole Clayborne
  - Kevin Zegers as Young Cole
- Zak Orth as Douglas Clayborne
  - David Klein as Young Douglas
- Tristan Tait as Travis Clayborne
  - Blair Slater as Young Travis
- Vera Farmiga as Emily Elliot
- David Aaron Baker as Harrison Elliot
- Stuart Wilson as Richard Elliot

== Production ==
The film was directed by Christopher Cain and was written by Earl W. Wallace who adapted the screenplay from the Claybornes of Rose Hill novels, which were written by author Julie Garwood. This film is based on the first novel in Garwood's series, For the Roses. It premiered on CBS on April 20, 1997 in the United States, as was distributed by Hallmark Home Entertainment. Principal photography took place in Calgary, Alberta, Longview, Alberta and Montreal, Quebec in Canada.

== Accolades ==
Year	Award	Category	Recipient(s)	Result
1998	Golden Reel Award	Best Sound Editing	Rose Hill	Nominated
1998	Young Artist Award	Best Performance – Young Ensemble	Kevin Zegers, David Klein, Blair Slater, Michael Alexander Jackson	Nominated
1998	Young Artist Award	Best Performance – Young Actress Age 10 or Under	Courtney Chase	Nominated

== Differences from novels ==
- Adam marries
- Cole is killed
- Douglas and Travis leave the ranch in search of their independent fortunes
- There is no correspondence between the siblings and Mary Rose
- Harrison is Mary Rose's brother
- Mary Rose's father lives in New York
