= I Have Decided to Follow Jesus =

Christian hymn

- Hymn
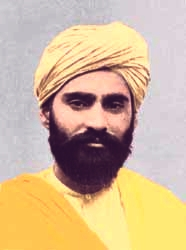
- Sadhu Sundar Singh
- Genre: Hymn
- Language: English
- Based on: John 12:26
- Meter: 10.10.10.8
- Melody: Indian Folk song

"I Have Decided to Follow Jesus" is a Christian hymn that originated in Assam, present-day Meghalaya, India.

According to P. Job, the lyrics are based on the last words of Nokseng, a Garo man, a tribe from Meghalaya which then was in Assam, who converted to Christianity in the middle of the 19th century through the efforts of an American Baptist missionary. He is said to have recited verses from the twelfth chapter of the Gospel of John as he and his family were killed. The formation of the martyr's words into a hymn has been attributed to the Indian missionary Sadhu Sundar Singh.

An alternative tradition attributes the hymn to pastor Simon K Marak from Jorhat, Assam.

The melody of the song is an Indian Folk tune, which was titled "Assam" after the region where the text originated.

An American hymn editor, William Jensen Reynolds, composed an arrangement which was included in the 1959 Assembly Songbook. His version became a regular feature of Billy Graham's evangelistic meetings in America and elsewhere, spreading its popularity.

Due to the lyrics' explicit focus on the believer's own commitment, the hymn is cited as a prime example of decision theology, emphasizing the human response rather than the action of God in giving faith. This has led to its exclusion from some hymnals. A Lutheran writer noted, "It definitely has a different meaning when we sing it than it did for the person who composed it."

== Cultural references ==
The 2006 film Though None Go with Me uses a line from the song as its title.

Many modern worship songs sample lines from the hymn, including Christ Is Enough (from the album "Glorious Ruins" by Hillsong Worship) and Goodbye Yesterday by Elevation Rhythm.
