= Girls of Canby Hall =

The Girls of Canby Hall Series by Emily Chase, published by Scholastic (1984–1989), is a collection of young adult novels, based around the lives of a group of students at a New England boarding school.

Emily Chase, the "official author" is not really one writer, but many authors who have alternated themselves to write books (one of the most famous is the romantic author Julie Garwood).

Parts of the series have been translated into Dutch and Finnish.

== Plot summary ==
The story began with three teen-age girls coming to Canby Hall, a prestigious boarding school in Greenleaf, Massachusetts. Canby Hall was named after Julia Canby, the daughter of a Boston businessman who had died of scarlet fever while abroad in Europe. The three girls were: Shelley Hyde, from Iowa; Faith Thompson from Washington, D.C. and Dana Morrison from New York City. They were assigned to 407 Baker Hall. (The other two dorm halls were Addison and Charles houses) At first the three girls clashed due to their differences, (Dana and Faith, both being from the East Coast, bonded immediately and Shelley had a harder time adapting due to her being from the Midwest) but their young and hip housemother, Alison Cavanaugh, helped them sort through their differences and they bonded and became best friends. Their friendship was even more solidified when, during a trip to see Shelley's family and friends in Iowa, Faith had a terrible medical emergency, which scared everyone involved.

After Shelley, Dana and Faith graduated, three new girls (Andrea "Andy" Cord; Jane Barrett and October "Toby" Houston) moved into 407, and on occasion, the six girls would get together, mainly for their former housemother's wedding and her pregnancy. Jane's family (the Barretts) had helped give the money to build the school's science hall named Barrett Hall. After Alison's marriage and her move to Boston, a new housemother named Meredith Pembroke comes along, and at first, handed out demerits with reckless abandon because she was overreacting to her own wild adolescence. Andrea, Jane and Toby talked her through the rough time, and Meredith (nicknamed, Merrie) subsequently became as nice and friendly as Alison had been.

The other main adult, aside from the housemothers, was the school's austere headmistress, Patrice Allardyce, who was known as P.A. behind her back. Despite her austerity and her enforcement of the rules, Ms. Allardyce was also discovered to be a fair, compassionate and personable human being too.

== The Girls of Canby Hall Series ==
=== List of books ===
1. Roommates, 1984
2. Our Roommate is Missing, 1984
3. You're No Friend of Mine, 1984
4. Keeping Secrets, 1984
5. Summer Blues, 1984
6. Best Friends Forever, 1984
7. Four Is a Crowd, 1984
8. The Big Crush, 1984
9. Boy Trouble, 1984
10. Make Me a Star, 1985
11. With Friends Like That, 1985
12. Who's the New Girl?, 1985
13. Here Come the Boys, 1985
14. What's a Girl To Do?, 1985 (by Julie Garwood)
15. To Tell the Truth, 1985
16. Three of a Kind, 1985
17. Graduation Day, 1986
18. Making Friends, 1986
19. One Boy Too Many, 1986
20. Friends Times Three, 1987
21. Party Time!, 1987
22. Troublemaker, 1987
23. But She's So Cute, 1987
24. Princess Who?, 1987
25. The Ghost of Canby Hall, 1987
26. Help Wanted!, 1988
27. The Roommate and the Cowboy, 1988
28. Happy Birthday, Jane, 1988
29. A Roommate Returns, 1988
30. Surprise!, 1988
31. Here Comes the Bridesmaid, 1988
32. Who's Got a Crush on Andy?, 1989
33. Six Roommates and a Baby, 1989

=== Super Editions (Related titles) ===
- Something Old, Something New, 1986
- The Almost Summer Carnival, 1987

== References and resources ==
- Scholastic Website

Specific
