= List of How the West Was Won episodes =

The following is an episode list for the TV series How the West Was Won.

== Series overview ==
Season	Episodes	Originally released	
Season	Episodes	First released	Last released
Movie		January 19, 1976	
1	3	February 6, 1977	February 20, 1977
2	14	February 12, 1978	May 21, 1978
3	11	January 15, 1979	April 23, 1979

== Episodes ==
=== Movie (1976) ===
Title	Directed by	Written by	Original release date
"The Macahans"	Bernard McEveety	Jim Byrnes	January 19, 1976
Zeb Macahan returns to the farm of Macahan to take his family to Oregon. The Civil War is about to begin and the family wants to go west to make sure that sons Seth (later called Luke) and Jed (later called Josh) are not drafted. Uncle Zeb agrees to lead the family on the perilous journey, but the war has greater consequences for the family than they could imagine. Guest Stars: Gene Evans as Dutton, John Crawford as Hale Crowley, Rudy Diaz as Sioux Chief Bear Dance, Jonathan Banks as Woodward, William Bryant as Major at Shiloh, and William Conrad as the narrator.

=== Season 1 (1977) ===
No. overall	No. in series	Title	Directed by	Written by	Original release date
1	1	"Provost Marshal"	Burt Kennedy & Daniel Mann	Ron Bishop, Jim Byrnes, William Kelley, John Mantley & Earl W. Wallace	February 6, 1977
Luke is on the run from Captain Grey who wants to arrest him for deserting from the Union Army. Luke gets shot when trying to prevent some men harassing a woman and is later taken care of by a group of Simonites. Zeb searches for Luke so the family can continue the journey towards Oregon. Guest Stars: Anthony Zerbe as Martin Grey, David Huddleston as Christy Johnson, Britt Lind as Erika Hanks and William Conrad as the Narrator.
2	2	"Erika"	Burt Kennedy & Daniel Mann	Ron Bishop, Jim Byrnes, William Kelley, John Mantley & Earl W. Wallace	February 13, 1977
Zeb finds Luke with the Simonites but before Luke is strong enough to leave, Zeb must take the opportunity to find a friend who has started a vendetta against an Indian tribe. Luke has taken a liking for the lifestyle of the Simonites and especially for the young and beautiful Erika who has looked after him. He therefore contemplates the option of becoming a Simonite. Guest Stars: Anthony Zerbe as Martin Grey, David Huddleston as Christy Johnson, Paul Fix as Portagee, Jack Elam as Cully Madigan, Britt Lind as Erika Hanks and William Conrad as the Narrator.
3	3	"Bowie John Christie"	Burt Kennedy & Daniel Mann	Ron Bishop, Jim Byrnes, William Kelley, John Mantley & Earl W. Wallace	February 20, 1977
Zeb must make the hardest choice in his life when attempting to save the life of his friend who has been taken captive by the Indians. Luke realizes that he can not stay with the Simonites after more trouble has erupted and the consequences are horrible when Erika decides to follow him. Meanwhile, back on the farm, the rest of the family finds itself in the midst of an Indian tribal war. And at the same time Captain Grey, now turned bounty hunter, continues to search for Luke. Guest Stars: Anthony Zerbe as Martin Grey, David Huddleston as Christy Johnson, Paul Fix as Portagee, Jack Elam as Cully Madigan, Britt Lind as Erika Hanks and William Conrad as the Narrator.

=== Season 2 (1978) ===
No. overall	No. in series	Title	Directed by	Written by	Original release date
4	1	"Buffalo Story"	Bernard McEveety & Vincent McEveety	Colley Cibber, Calvin Clements, William Kelley, John Mantley, Katharyn M. Powers & Earl W. Wallace	February 12, 1978
Kate Macahan's sister, Molly Culhane, joins the family. A Mormon family arrives at the homestead while fleeing religious persecution, but the patriarch soon charms Laura. Zeb mediates between the Army and the angry Sioux after Russian royalty kills buffalo on Sioux land. Luke aids the local Sheriff and meets his feisty daughter.
5	2	"Mormon Story"	Bernard McEveety & Vincent McEveety	Colley Cibber, Calvin Clements, William Kelley, John Mantley, Katharyn M. Powers, John Stephens & Earl W. Wallace	February 19, 1978
Zeb sides with the Sioux after the Russian incident triggers a war - and the clash leads to a great leader's sacrifice. Luke's feelings for Hillary Gant intensify, but when her father learns of Luke's past, he asks Luke to leave. Laura accepts a marriage proposal, while Luke finds himself forced to join a thieving band of ex-Confederates.
6	3	"Interlude"	Bernard McEveety & Vincent McEveety	Colley Cibber, Calvin Clements, William Kelley, John Mantley, Katharyn M. Powers & Earl W. Wallace	February 26, 1978
Luke's attempt to foil the Flint Gang's gold robbery scheme doesn't go as planned. Zeb rescues a woman from two hide-cutters and is surprised to find a love from his past. When a certain guest arrives for Laura's wedding, second thoughts arise. Jessie fights for her life after being stung by a swarm of bees.
7	4	"Orville Gant"	Bernard McEveety & Vincent McEveety	Colley Cibber, Calvin Clements, William Kelley, John Mantley, Katharyn M. Powers & Earl W. Wallace	March 5, 1978
With the Sheriff's son held hostage by Flint, the robbery goes forward, leaving two men dead. Jessie's condition worsens as the doctor can't help her. Zeb and Beth's accounts of her rescue come under suspicion by the authorities, causing her to leave abruptly - with her trail leading Zeb to a mountain cabin.
8	5	"Amnesty"	Bernard McEveety & Vincent McEveety	Calvin Clements, John Mantley, Jack Miller & Earl W. Wallace	March 12, 1978
Zeb learns Beth's husband is a supposedly dead, guilt-ridden Army hero involved in a military massacre. As Jessie nears death, Zeb decides to take her to an Arapaho medicine man - with a skeptical Luke and Josh in close pursuit.
9	6	"Cattle Drive"	Bernard McEveety & Vincent McEveety	Calvin Clements, John Mantley, Jack Miller, & Earl W. Wallace	March 19, 1978
Jessie recovers with the help of the Arapaho, but the tribe finds itself on the brink of starvation due to a broken promise of beef shipments. Zeb and Luke embark on a cattle-herding journey across harsh flatlands, joined by contentious Indian drovers - and trailed by a young runaway.
10	7	"Robber's Roost"	Bernard McEveety & Vincent McEveety	Calvin Clements, Howard Fast, John Mantley & Earl W. Wallace	March 26, 1978
On the journey home, the stagecoach carrying Molly and Jessie is wrecked - and a dazed Jessie wanders into the desert, where she meets the young Navajo Teel-O. Zeb and Josh purchase a cattle herd to bring back to the reservation, and Zeb hires old friend Tap Henry to serve as a cook on the drive.
11	8	"Deek"	Bernard McEveety & Vincent McEveety	Calvin Clements, Howard Fast, John Mantley & Earl W. Wallace	April 9, 1978
Deek Peasley is reluctantly hired to lead the search party for Jessie, who tries to bridge the language gap with Teel-O. The cattle drive gets underway, shadowed by Tap's rustler cronies. While camping out, tensions mount between Deek and Molly, and a costly bargain is negotiated.
12	9	"The Judge"	Bernard McEveety & Vincent McEveety	Calvin Clements, Howard Fast, John Mantley & Earl W. Wallace	April 16, 1978
Jessie and Teel-O have a fateful encounter with Teel-O's grandfather. While scouting for water, Luke comes to the rescue of Judge Rensen, who offers to seek a pardon for Luke's criminal past in Missouri. Teel-O and Jessie are stalked by would-be slavers.
13	10	"Gold"	Bernard McEveety & Vincent McEveety	Calvin Clements, Howard Fast, John Mantley & Earl W. Wallace	April 23, 1978
Luke is jailed pending his hearing, and from his cell, gives a newspaper interview that draws trouble to Las Mesas. Apaches disrupt the cattle drive. Jessie is rescued, and she and the others return home to find gold in Macahan creek - just as Deek becomes more neighborly.
14	11	"Brothers"	Bernard McEveety & Vincent McEveety	Calvin Clements, Howard Fast, John Mantley & Earl W. Wallace	April 30, 1978
After he learns the presence of gold, Deek bribes a land agent to seize ownership of Macahan creek. Tap takes extreme measures to keep Zeb from learning about the rustlers. Josh arrives in Las Mesas to support Luke at his hearing and - literally - runs into Doreen, with whom he's instantly smitten.
15	12	"Secrets"	Bernard McEveety & Vincent McEveety	John Mantley & Earl W. Wallace	May 7, 1978
A vengeful Stillman hires local power broker Francis Britten to help convict Luke. Deek moves onto Macahan land, and Tap confesses the truth to Zeb. Luke gets a mysterious visitor.
16	13	"The Hearing"	Bernard McEveety & Vincent McEveety	Calvin Clements, John Mantley & Earl W. Wallace	May 14, 1978
Luke's hearing begins and things look bad for him: Frank Grayson produces proof that Luke was a member of the Flint Gang. A snooping Evans overplays his hand with Deek. Josh is framed for assault by Doreen - and his brother's plight provokes Luke into drastic action.
17	14	"The Posse"	Bernard McEveety & Vincent McEveety	Calvin Clements, John Mantley & Earl W. Wallace	May 21, 1978
Fleeing jail with Josh, Luke finds Judge Rensen dead. When the brothers split up after narrowly eluding the posse, Josh is attacked and Zeb's pursuit ends in a faceoff with Stillman. The entire cattle drive regroups and makes a final homeward push. Deek menaces Laura and Molly for the last time.

=== Season 3 (1979) ===
No. overall	No. in series	Title	Directed by	Written by	Original release date
18	1	"The Gunfighter"	Vincent McEveety	Ron Bishop & Steve Hayes	January 15, 1979
Rancher Henry Coe hires a professional gunman to drive the Macahans off what he considers to be his property. Frank Grayson ingratiates himself with the Macahans, but Josh recognizes him as the gunman once hired to kill Luke.
19	2	"The Rustler"	Barry Crane	Calvin Clements Sr. & John Mantley	January 22, 1979
Jessie is completely infatuated with a handsome young stranger named Bob who rescues her from the advances of a nasty character. Later on, the couple run away to a small town where a minister agrees to perform a wedding ceremony.
20	3	"The Enemy"	Gunnar Hellström	Ron Bishop & Steve Hayes	February 5, 1979
A by-the-book Army lieutenant clashes with the Macahans when he hunts for an Indian chief suspected of raiding wagons trains.
21	4	"The Innocent"	Alf Kjellin	Ray Goldrup	February 12, 1979
Josh becomes involved with a rivalry over a ferry business when he befriends Cora Johnson and her children, operators of a ferry crossing. The fight becomes more complicated when her mentally disabled son, Willie is accused of maliciously shooting a man in the leg.
22	5	"Hillary"	Irving J. Moore	Earl W. Wallace	February 26, 1979
Luke sets out to reclaim the affections of his neglected flame Hillary as well as get a confession from the man suspected of committing the murder with which Luke was long ago accused.
23	6	"L'Affaire Riel"	Harry Falk	John Mantley & Calvin Clements Sr.	March 5, 1979
Zeb reluctantly tries to help the U.S. Army capture a French-Indian revolutionary and leader of a violent Métis attempt to win back lands from Canada.
24	7	"The Scavengers"	Ralph Senensky	Calvin Clements Jr.	March 12, 1979
Zeb, Molly and Laura are enjoying a riverboat ride when pirates attack and overrun the ship.
25	8	"The Forgotten"	Barry Crane	Earl W. Wallace & Ray Goldrup	March 19, 1979
A mysterious stranger in the mountains turns out to be a former Confederate Army officer who claims he had no knowledge the war was over.
26	9	"Luke"	Vincent McEveety	Calvin Clements Sr. & John Mantley	April 2, 1979
Luke hooks up with a pretty, lethal robber who wants him for her own romantic reasons while he dodges bounty hunters in a desperate effort to clear his name of a murder charge.
27	10	"China Girl"	Joseph Pevney	Calvin Clements Jr.	April 16, 1979
The Macahan clan befriends a young Chinese immigrant whose rape on the ship has resulted in a pregnancy that provokes her father to proclaim the child must die.
28	11	"The Slavers"	Joseph Pevney	Dick Nelson	April 23, 1979
Zeb and Josh travel to Mexico to uncover a white slavery ring.
