= Mister Sterling =

- Genre: Drama
- Created by: Lawrence O'Donnell
- Starring: Josh Brolin; Audra McDonald; William Russ; David Noroña
- Country of origin: United States
- Original language: English
- No. of seasons: 1
- No. of episodes: 10 (1 unaired)

Production
- Executive producers: Michael Dinner; Jim Hart; Jeff Melvoin; Lawrence O'Donnell
- Producers: Bernadette Joyce; Garry A. Brown; Sandy Frank; Andrea Newman; Chip Vucelich; William Bradley
- Running time: 60 minutes
- Production companies: Lawrence O' Donnell Jr. Productions; NBC Studios; Universal Network Television

Original release
- Network: NBC
- Release: January 10 – March 14, 2003

Mister Sterling is an American drama television series created by Lawrence O'Donnell for NBC. The series ran from January 10 to March 14, 2003. Starring Josh Brolin as an idealistic United States Senator, the series featured Audra McDonald, William Russ, David Norona, and James Whitmore as members of his staff. The series aired on Friday nights and despite mostly positive reviews, it was canceled after 9 episodes aired. The show ranked 58th in the yearly ratings (9.83 million viewers, 6.7/12 rating/share).

Although it had numerous similarities to The West Wing in style and tone (especially the show's idealistic attitude towards politics) and the unnamed president in the series is stated to be a Democrat, it was not set in the same universe as O'Donnell's other political show. It is unknown if a cross-over would have ever occurred had Mister Sterling not been canceled; however, Steven Culp played presidential aspirant Sen. Ron Garland on Mister Sterling and House Speaker Jeff Haffley on The West Wing, and Democrats appeared to be in the majority in the U.S. Senate on Mister Sterling, while in The West Wing consistent Republican control of both houses of Congress was a key plot point.

James Whitmore was nominated for a 2003 Emmy Award for Outstanding Guest Actor in a Drama Series for playing former Governor Bill Sterling, the senator's father.

The series was produced by Bernadette Joyce, co-producer; Garry A. Brown, co-producer; Michael Dinner, co-executive producer; Sandy Frank, co-producer; Jim Hart, co-executive producer; Jeff Melvoin, co-executive producer; Andrea Newman, producer; Lawrence O'Donnell, executive producer; Chip Vucelich, co-producer; William Bradley, consulting producer.

== Cast ==
- Josh Brolin as Bill Sterling
- Audra McDonald as Jackie Brock
- William Russ as Tommy Doyle
- David Norona as Leon Montero
- James Whitmore as Bill Sterling, Sr. (recurring role)

== Characters ==
=== Senator Sterling's office ===
- Senator Bill Sterling (I-California)
- Chief of Staff Jackie Brock
- Legislative Director Tommy Doyle
- Legislative Assistant Leon Montero
- Secretary Pat Conway (Dale Raoul)
- Deputy Press Secretary Derek Larner (Dean Cameron)

=== Senators ===
- Senator Albert Bailey (D-CA)
  - Sterling was appointed to his seat after Bailey died of a heart attack.
- Senator Burt Gammel (R-Louisiana)
  - Senate Minority Leader
- Senate Majority Leader (D-New Mexico)
- Senator Dan Wilson (D-Illinois)
- Senator Jack "Thunder Hawk" Jackson (R-Arizona)
- Senator Kate Robertson (Nevada)
  - Elected in 1998.
- Senator Millman
- Senator Ron Garland (R-Ohio)
  - Running for the Presidency.
- Senator Bowles
- Senator Dave Crandall (D-Delaware)
- Senator Roger Morris (D)
- Senator Andersen
- Senator Buckley
- Senator Burke
- Senator Carver
- Senator Gilmartin
- Senator Lane
- Senator Eaton
- Senator Porter
- Senator Preston
- Senator Raymond
- Senator Smith
- Senator Stanton
- Senator Stewart
- Senator Taylor
- Senator Trimble
- Senator Troy
- Senator Grayson

=== Governors ===
- Governor Carl Marino (D-CA)
- Former Governor William Sterling (D-CA)

=== Lobbyist ===
- Barry Reed

=== Democratic leadership ===
- Arthur Peyton, Executive Director of the Democratic Senatorial Campaign Committee, former Chief of Staff to Senator Bailey (D-CA)

=== Senate contenders ===
This is a list of candidates who are running for the U.S. Senate seat currently held by Bill Sterling:

==== Democrat ====
- Anthony Marino, son of the Governor (D-CA)
- Chuck Stanley, millionaire (D-CA)
- G.M. Clooney, coffee maker (D-CA)

==== Republican ====
- Sarah Burwell (R-CA)
- Congressman Bob "The Bomber" Brennan (R-CA)

=== Other ===
- Lauren Barnes, actress
- Laura Chandler, reporter (Chandra West)
- Rebecca Everton, Assistant Secretary of Housing and Urban Development

== Episodes ==
No.	Title	Directed by	Written by	Original release date	Prod. code
1	"Pilot"	Tucker Gates	Lawrence O'Donnell	January 10, 2003	EP011
2	"Next Question"	Michael Dinner	Lawrence O'Donnell	January 17, 2003	E3502
3	"Game Time"	Randall Zisk	Lawrence O'Donnell	January 24, 2003	E3504
4	"Technical Corrections"	Rick Rosenthal	Lawrence O'Donnell	January 31, 2003	E3501
5	"Human Error"	James Whitmore Jr.	Sandy Frank & Paul Haggis	February 7, 2003	E3506
6	"Nothing Personal"	Rick Wallace	Alfredo Barrios, Jr. & Lawrence O'Donnell	February 21, 2003	E3507
7	"The Statewide Swing"	Rick Rosenthal	Andrea Newman	February 28, 2003	E3505
8	"Wish List"	Elodie Keene	Willie Reale & Lawrence O'Donnell	March 7, 2003	E3508
9	"Final Passage"	Paul Michael Glaser	Paul Haggis & Lawrence O'Donnell	March 14, 2003	E3510
10	"Sins of the Father"	Jessica Yu	Story by : Lawrence O'Donnell & Paul Haggis; Teleplay by : Paul Haggis	UNAIRED	E3511
A reporter from the New York Times reveals a history of bribe-taking by Governor Sterling Sr., leaving the Senator and his staff to deal with the repercussions.
