= Inconceivable (TV series) =

American television series

- The cast
- Genre: Medical drama
- Created by: Oliver Goldstick; Marco Pennette
- Starring: Ming-Na; Angie Harmon; Jonathan Cake; Mary Catherine Garrison; David Norona; Reynaldo Rosales
- Composer: Jeff Martin
- Country of origin: United States
- Original language: English
- No. of seasons: 1
- No. of episodes: 2 (7 unaired)

Production
- Executive producers: Marco Pennette; Mike Tollin; Brian Robbins; Oliver Goldstick
- Producer: Ming-Na Wen
- Running time: 60 minutes
- Production companies: Tollin/Robbins Productions; Touchstone Television

Original release
- Network: NBC
- Release: September 23 – November 4, 2005

Inconceivable is an American medical drama television series revolving around a fertility clinic, which was broadcast on NBC. The program premiered on September 23, 2005, and ended after two episodes on September 30, 2005. The series was created by Oliver Goldstick and Marco Pennette. Goldstick and Pennette also served as executive producers as did Brian Robbins and Mike Tollin. The show was a Touchstone Television and Tollin/Robbins production, one of the few shows produced by the former not to air on ABC in recent years. After only two episodes of the series aired, it was pulled from the air in early October due to low ratings, and was cancelled by NBC just a few days later.

== Premise ==
The show revolves around the professional and personal lives of those who work at the Family Options Fertility Clinic in Los Angeles, California. The clinic is run by its co-founders Rachel Lu (Ming-Na) and Dr. Malcolm Bowers (Jonathan Cake) along with their new partner Dr. Nora Campbell (Angie Harmon). The staff includes an attorney Scott Garcia (David Norona), a nurse Patrice (Joelle Carter), office manager Marissa (Mary Catherine Garrison) and a medical technician Angel (Reynaldo Rosales).

== Cast ==
- Ming-Na – Rachel Lu
- Jonathan Cake – Dr. Malcolm Bowers
- David Norona – Scott Garcia
- Reynaldo Rosales – Angel Hernandez
- Joelle Carter – Patrice Locicero
- Mary Catherine Garrison – Marissa Jaffee
- Angie Harmon – Dr. Nora Campbell

== Episodes ==
No.	Title	Directed by	Written by	Original release date
1	"Pilot"	Jonathan Kaplan	Oliver Goldstick & Marco Pennette	September 23, 2005
When a Caucasian surrogate mother gives birth to an African American baby, the couple for whom she was supposed to carry a child for refuses to take the newborn. Rachel is caught in the middle of the madness as she tries to sort things out, but is afraid that the clinic may be sued, or shut down, by the couple. The clinic's psychologist, Lydia (Alfre Woodard), finds that her job may be in jeopardy because she might not have done the proper background check on the surrogate mother. As the mother refuses to tell the truth about the baby's father and as the time gets closer for Child Services to step in and take the child, Marissa offers to adopt. However, the birth father is finally contacted and takes the baby home. Meanwhile, Dr. Bowers is helping fulfill a dead soldier's dream of being a mother by using her sister as the surrogate for her frozen embryos. Just before the process is started, however, the widower finds himself questioning the whole thing and backs out. Dr. Bowers also is having to deal with a couple who is having problems conceiving a child and ask Dr. Nora Campbell (who he used to date) for help. Patrice seeks revenge on Dr. Bowers over their breakup by stealing his sperm and putting it in one of the specimen cups in the laboratory. At the same time, Scott and his partner welcome their baby to the world. Also, Rachel's son asks questions about his father and she reluctantly gives him answers.
2	"Secrets and Thighs"	Chris Long	Oliver Goldstick & Marco Pennette	September 30, 2005
After the Lindstrom family's birth didn't go as planned, they brought a lawsuit against the clinic risking all that the clinic has established. As Scott tries to battle the case in the courtroom, Nora overhears the problem and offers to help by giving a large sum of money to the Lindstrom as a settlement. There is one catch, though—Nora wants to become a partner in the clinic. Lydia has dealings with a couple that, come to find out, the wife is actually taking birth control to prevent having children. Due to her having extensive plastic surgery, she is afraid her genes will give the child some of her bad physical attributes. She wants to have a "perfect" child by having an attractive donor. Her husband, however, knows none of this. Eventually he is informed. Scott and his partner are running low on breast milk which was provided by their surrogate and are looking for options. Scott's partner, at first, refuses to accept formula and asks Marissa for help. Patrice become increasingly paranoid as she receives anonymous emails from someone who saw her swap specimens in the laboratory. A close couple friend of Rachel's finally decide to not have a family after multiple surrogates bail out on them at the last minute. Rachel then makes a huge decision by offering to carry their baby for them at which they accept. Dr. Bowers and Nora work with a woman who can have a risky procedure to fertilize her. The problem is that it is illegal. Dr. Bowers agrees to have Nora perform it, but then changes his mind because of the possible legal ramifications. Nora, however, wants to go on with the planned process and is able to change Dr. Bowers' mind. In a shocking close to the episode, Lydia is confronted by an angry Mr. Lindstrom at the office stating that everyone working there will take no responsibility for their actions. In revenge, Mr. Lindstrom hits Lydia with his car in the parking garage. Her fate is unknown.
3	"To Surrogate, with Love"	Peter Ellis	Joan Binder Weiss	Unaired
4	"Balls in Your Court"	Jamie Babbit	Donald Todd	Unaired
5	"Sex, Lies & Sonograms"	Kevin Dowling	Alison Cross	Unaired
6	"Face Your Demon, Semen"	David Paymer	Alison Cross	Unaired
7	"Last Straw"	Bethany Rooney	Drew Z. Greenberg	Unaired
8	"Between an Egg and a Hard Place"	N/A	N/A	Unaired
9	"From Here to Motility aka Season Finale"	N/A	N/A	Unaired
