= Though None Go with Me =

- Based on: Though None Go with Me by Jerry B. Jenkins
- Screenplay by: Pamela Wallace
- Directed by: Armand Mastroianni
- Starring: Cheryl Ladd; Amy Grabow
- Theme music composer: Nathan Furst
- Country of origin: United States
- Original language: English

Production
- Producers: Kyle A. Clark; Robert Halmi; Larry Levinson
- Cinematography: Amit Bhattacharya
- Editors: Christine Kelley; Andrew Vona
- Running time: 120 minutes
- Production company: Larry Levinson Productions

Original release
- Network: Hallmark Channel
- Release: April 8, 2006

Though None Go with Me is a 2006 American made-for-television drama film that premiered on Hallmark Channel. It is directed by Armand Mastroianni, and stars Cheryl Ladd. The film is based on the best-selling book by Jerry B. Jenkins.

== Plot ==
Elizabeth Leroy is a young woman growing up during the 1950s in the United States. She has devoted her life to serving God but through many hardships and heartbreaks over the years, her faith is tested. She begins to question the purpose of her life.

Elizabeth lives with her widowed father, James, who is a doctor. Her mother died of cancer when she was young. She just finished school and wants to see the world. She has no intention of settling down with childhood friend, and neighbor, Will Bishop, when he asks her to marry him.

One day she is asked to pick up the new assistant pastor, Ben Phillips, at the train station and show him around town. Expecting to meet an older gentleman, she is surprised to find him to be young and handsome. They fall in love and get engaged. She is heartbroken when he leaves to serve as chaplain during the Korean War. He explains that he believes God called him to serve, and that he promised God to follow Him no matter what. He also promises to marry her when he returns. At the train station he gives her a Bible with the inscription in the front, "Though none go with me, yet will I follow. No turning back, no turning back." They write letters and Elizabeth keeps herself busy helping other people.

When her father passes away, Elizabeth discovers that he has left her no money, plus the house is heavily mortgaged, leaving the bank to take possession of it. She moves in with Will who also offers her a secretarial job in his auto insurance company. One day, an army officer stops by their door to tell her that Ben has died when the army hospital took a direct hit. Elizabeth is crushed and faints. As time passes she begins to fall in love with Will, especially when he starts dating someone else. When she decides it's time to move out of his house, he declares his love for her and they get married.

When they return from their honeymoon, Elizabeth receives a letter from Ben who writes that he wasn't killed but has been a prisoner-of-war and will soon be home. She tells Will, who is heartbroken and asks her whether she will stay with him out of loyalty or does Ben have her heart? She declares her love for Will and does not intend to leave him. When Ben comes home, he and Elizabeth embrace, but she tells him that she was told he was dead and that she married Will. He is crushed, but asks her to write him to tell her what's happening in her life.

Will and Elizabeth have many happy years together and have a son. Their son marries and his wife bears him a daughter, but their son and his wife are killed in a car accident on the way home from a Christmas party, leaving their daughter to be raised by her grandparents; Will and Elizabeth. At this point, Elizabeth becomes angry at God, asking Him why He keeps taking away everyone that she loves - her parents, her first love, and now her son.

Will eventually dies of brain disease after 40+ years of marriage. Not long after that, her best friend Fran hosts a party to thank her for 50 years of service to the community. Many people tell stories of how she impacted their lives and she is deeply touched. One of the attendees at the party is Ben...

== Cast ==
- Cheryl Ladd as Elizabeth
- Amy Grabow as Young Elizabeth
- Denise Grayson as Older Sally
- David Noroña as Will Bishop
- Brad Rowe as Young Ben Phillips
- Bruce Weitz as Older Will Bishop
- Peter White as Older Ben Phillips

== Title ==
The phrase Though None Go with Me is from the lyrics of a Christian hymn called I Have Decided to Follow Jesus with lyrics by Sadhu Sundar Singh set to a Hindustani melody.
