= Amy Grabow =

American actress (born 1979)

- Born: December 18, 1979 (age 46); Huntington Beach, California
- Occupation: Actress
- Years active: 1998–present

Amy Grabow (born December 18, 1979) is an American actress.

Amy Grabow grew up in Huntington Beach, California. She decided, while still in high school, to pursue an acting career. She studied at the Academy for the Performing Arts in Huntington Beach. Her television credits include: Charmed, Mad TV, Monk and Saved by the Bell: The New Class. She was also a series regular in "Cloud Nine" and "Space Orphans", and has appeared in several television commercials.

She played Dr. Rachel Adair on the soap opera General Hospital from February 2005 until her final appearance on August 5, 2005, where her character was murdered by Dr. Asher Thomas (Larry Poindexter).

Grabow starred in the Hallmark Channel movie Though None Go with Me opposite Cheryl Ladd. She made guest appearances on the WB's Supernatural and Charmed. She also has been seen on NBC's Crossing Jordan. She had a small role in the movie Totally Blonde.

She starred as Tipper Gore in the third episode of American Horror Stories.
