= David Norona =

American actor (born 1972)

David Noroña
- Born: December 14, 1972 (age 53); Hialeah, Florida, U.S.
- Occupation: Actor
- Years active: 1993–present
- Website: davidnorona.com

David Noroña, usually simplified as David Norona, (born December 14, 1972) is a Cuban American actor and director who has appeared in films including Though None Go with Me, TV series including The Mentalist and Jack Ryan, and various theatre works. He is co-creator and co-lyricist for Paradise Lost: Shadows and Wings and has directed two short films.

== Biography ==
David Noroña was born in Hialeah, Florida to Cuban parents Jorge Noroña and Edith Iglesias. He began his acting career at Coral Gables Senior High School in Coral Gables, Florida with roles in The Sound of Music and The Fantasticks. After receiving his BFA with honors from Carnegie Mellon University, he set off for New York City where he made his Broadway debut in Love! Valour! Compassion!.

He has acted in films, like shorts Maggie Moore and Soledad, and has appeared in many television series, including Six Feet Under, Inconceivable, Mister Sterling and Lipstick Jungle.

Noroña has also landed roles on theatre stages. He played the role of Irving Berlin in The Tin Pan Alley Rag at both the Pasadena Playhouse theatre and the Coconut Grove Playhouse. The role landed him a nomination for the Los Angeles Ovation Award. He also had the lead role of Frankie Valli in the original run of Jersey Boys at La Jolla Playhouse in San Diego, California. On January 24, 2005, he received the prize for "Lead Performance in a Musical, Male" for his role during the San Diego Theatre Critics Circle 2004 awards. He also played the role of George in a Latin remake of Of Mice and Men at the Pasadena Playhouse.

David Noroña is co-writer and co-lyricist of Paradise Lost: Shadows and Wings, a piece that combined classical singing with ambient, trance and dance electronica. It received rave reviews, critical acclaim and nominations to ten Ovation Awards including "Best New Musical".

== Personal life ==
Noroña is married with two sons and two daughters, and resides in Redding, California.

== Works ==
=== Film ===
Feature

- 1993: Money for Nothing as US Air Ticket Clerk
- 1996: Mrs. Santa Claus as Marcello Damaroco
- 1997: Twisted as Angel
- 2000: The Expendables as Ramone
- 2000: Alligator Alley as Jay Taylor
- 2001: Bailey's Mistake as Father Miguel
- 2006: Though None Go with Me as Will Bishop
- 2011: A Crush on You as Gabe

Short

- 2000: Maggie Moore as Alex
- 2000: Soledad

=== Television ===
(Selective. For a comprehensive list, see IMDb)

- 2000: Popular as Nurse Dan Murphy (3 episodes)
- 2001–2002: Six Feet Under as Gary Deitman (8 episodes)
- 2001: Frasier as Lance (1 episode – "Forgotten But Not Gone")
- 2003: Monk as Lt. Plato (1 episode – "Mr. Monk Goes to Mexico") (as David Noroña)
- 2003: Mister Sterling as Leon Montero (10 episodes)
- 2005: Inconceivable as Scott García (9 episodes)
- 2005: CSI: Miami as Joshua Greenfield (1 episode)
- 2007: In Case of Emergency as Paul (4 episodes)
- 2007: Ugly Betty as Tyler Blake (1 episode)
- 2008–2009: Lipstick Jungle as Salvador Rosa (18 episodes)
- 2009: Bones as Derek DaFonte (1 episode)
- 2010: The Defenders as ADA Andrew Gomez (2 episodes)
- 2011–2014: The Mentalist as D.D.A. Osvaldo Ardiles (8 episodes)
- 2012: One Tree Hill as Dr. Alvarez (6 episodes)
- 2016: Designated Survivor as Governor Rivera (1 episode)
- 2017–2018: The Gifted as Senator Matthew Montez (3 episodes)
- 2019: Jack Ryan as José Marzan (6 episodes)

=== Theatre ===
As writer/lyricist

- Paradise Lost: Shadows and Wings (co-creator and co-lyricist of musical)

As actor

- 1995: Love! Valour! Compassion! (Understudy: David Noroña [Bobby Brahms, Ramon Fornos])
- 2004: Jersey Boys as Frankie Valli (lead role – original run on La Jolla Playhouse in San Diego, California)
- 2008: Of Mice and Men as George
- 2009: The Tin Pan Alley Rag as Irving Berlin
