= Julie Garwood =

American writer (1944–2023)

- Born: December 26, 1944; Kansas City, Missouri, U.S.
- Died: June 8, 2023 (aged 78); Leawood, Kansas, U.S.
- Occupation: Novelist
- Writing career
- Pen name: Emily Chase (team of writers)
- Period: 1985–2023
- Genres: Young Adult, Romance
- Notable work: The Bride
- Notable awards: RITA award – Single Title Historical Romance; 1990 The Bride
- Website: juliegarwood.com

Julie Elizabeth Garwood (née Murphy; December 26, 1944 – June 8, 2023) was an American writer of over twenty-seven romance novels in both the historical and suspense subgenres. Over thirty-five million copies of her books are in print, and she had at least 24 New York Times Bestsellers. She also wrote a novel for young adults called A Girl Named Summer.

Garwood's novel For the Roses was adapted for the television feature Rose Hill.

== Biography ==
Julie Garwood born Julia Elizabeth Murphy and was raised in Kansas City, Missouri, the sixth of seven children in a large Irish family. She was the daughter of Felicita “Flip” Murphy, née Kennedy and Thomas Murphy and had five sisters: Sharon, Kathleen, Marilyn, Mary Colette "Cookie", and Joanne, and one brother: Tom. After having a tonsillectomy at age six, because she missed so much school, she did not learn to read as the other children her age did. She was eleven before her mother realized Garwood was unable to read. A math teacher, Sister Elizabeth, devoted the entire summer that year to teaching Garwood how to read, and how to enjoy the stories she was reading. This teacher had such an impact on Garwood's life that she named her daughter Elizabeth.

While studying to be a registered nurse, Garwood took a Russian history course and became intrigued by history, choosing to pursue a double major in history and nursing. A professor, impressed by the quality of her essays, convinced Garwood to write. The result was a children's book, A Girl Named Summer, and her first historical novel, Gentle Warrior.

Garwood married young and had three children: Gerry, Bryan, and Elizabeth. The family resided in Leawood, Kansas. Although Garwood enjoyed her writing, she was not intending to pursue a career as an author. As a young wife and mother she took several freelance writing jobs, and wrote longer stories to amuse herself. After her youngest child started school, Garwood began attending local writers' conferences, where she soon met an agent. The agent sold both her children's book and her historical novel, and soon the publisher requested more historical romances.

Garwood's novels are particularly known for the quirkiness of her heroines, who tend to have an ability to get lost anywhere, clumsiness, and a "charming ability to obfuscate and change the direction of conversations to the consternation, frustration, but eventual acceptance of the other party." She was not afraid to tackle difficult issues, and one of her books deals with spousal abuse.

Despite her success in the historical romance genre, Garwood ventured into a new genre and began writing contemporary romantic suspense novels. Like her historicals, these contemporaries still focus on family relationships, whether between blood relatives or groups of friends who have styled themselves as a family.

Her first contemporary offering, Heartbreaker, was optioned for film and was serialized in Cosmopolitan.

Garwood died at her home in Kansas on June 8, 2023, at the age of 78.

== Bibliography ==
=== As Emily Chase ===
==== The Girls of Canby Hall series ====
- 14.What's a Girl to Do? 1985

(Under the pseudonym Emily Chase, Julie Garwood wrote one Young Adult novel).

=== As Julie Garwood ===
==== Young Adult ====
- A Girl Named Summer (March 1986)

==== Single Novels ====
- Gentle Warrior (Elizabeth Montwright - Geoffrey Berkley) (October 1985)
- Rebellious Desire (Caroline Richmond - Jered Marcus Benton) (June 1986)
- Honor's Splendour (Madelyne - Baron Duncan) (December 1987)
- The Prize (August 1991)
- Saving Grace (December 1993)
- Prince Charming (June 1994)

==== Crown's Spies Series ====
1. The Lion's Lady (December 1988)
2. Guardian Angel (May 1990)
3. The Gift (January 1991)
4. Castles (July 1993)

==== Lairds' Brides Series ====
1. The Bride (July 1989)
2. The Wedding (April 1996)

==== Highlands' Lairds Series ====
1. The Secret (May 1992)
2. Ransom (September 1999)
3. Shadow Music (December 2007)

==== Clayborne of Rosehill Series ====
1. For The Roses (February 1995)
2. One Pink Rose (June 1997) (and in "The Clayborne Brides")
3. One White Rose (July 1997) (and in "The Clayborne Brides")
4. One Red Rose (August 1997) (and in "The Clayborne Brides")
5. Come The Spring (December 1997)

==== Buchanan/FBI Series ====
1. Heartbreaker (August 2000) (Nick Buchanan/Laurant Madden)
2. Mercy (September 2001) (Theo Buchanan/Dr. Michelle Renard)
3. Killjoy (September 2002) (John Paul Renard/Avery Delaney)
4. Murder List (August 2004) (Alec Buchanan/Regan Hamilton Madison)
5. Slow Burn (August 2005) (Dylan Buchanan/Kate MacKenna)
6. Shadow Dance (December 2006) (Noah Clayborne/Jordan Buchanan)
7. Fire and Ice (December 2008) (Jack MacAlister/Sophie Summerfield Rose)
8. Sizzle (December 2009) (Samuel Kincaid/Lyra Prescott)
9. The Ideal Man (August 2011) (Max Daniels/Dr. Ellie Sullivan)
10. Sweet Talk (August 2012) (Grayson Kincaid/Olivia Mackenzie)
11. Hotshot (June 2013) (Finn MacBain/Peyton Lockhart)
12. Fast Track (February 2014) (Aiden Madison/Cordelia Kane)
13. Wired (May 2017) (Liam Scott/Alison Trent)
14. Grace Under Fire (July 2022) (Michael Buchanan/ Grace Isabel MacKenna)

== Awards and reception ==
- 1990 - Romance Writers of America RITA Award, Single Title Historical Romance – The Bride
- 2009 - Romantic Times Reviewers' Choice Award finalist, Romantic Intrigue – Fire and Ice

Garwood won many awards for her work including three Romantic Times Reviewers’ Choice Awards, and two Romantic Times Career Achievement Awards.
