= B. Tennyson Sebastian II =

American sound engineer

- Occupation: Sound engineer
- Years active: 1980–present

B. Tennyson Sebastian II is an American sound engineer. He was nominated for an Academy Award in the category Best Sound for the film Back to the Future. He has worked on more than 40 films since 1980.

== Selected filmography ==
- Back to the Future (1985)
