= Stan Jolley =

American art director and production designer

- Born: Stanford Jolley; May 17, 1926; New York City, New York
- Died: June 4, 2012 (aged 86); Rancho Mirage, California
- Occupations: Art director Production designer
- Years active: 1935-1970

Stanford Jolley, Jr. (May 17, 1926 – June 4, 2012), known as Stan Jolley, was an American art director and production designer, originally employed by Walt Disney Studios before he struck out on his own.

In an unusual reprise of a crew role, Jolley was the production designer for the Quinn Martin TV series The F.B.I., and then over a decade later for the updated series Today's FBI, produced by Martin's longtime competitor David Gerber.

He was nominated for an Academy Award in the category Best Art Direction for the 1985 film Witness.

His father was actor I. Stanford Jolley.

Stan Jolley died of gastric cancer in 2012, aged 86.
