= How the West Was Won (TV series) =

American Western television series (1976–1979)

- Also known as: The Macahans
- Genre: Western
- Based on: How the West Was Won in Life; How the West Was Won by James R. Webb
- Developed by: Albert S. Ruddy; Jim Byrnes
- Starring: James Arness; Bruce Boxleitner; Fionnula Flanagan; Kathryn Holcomb; William Kirby Cullen; Vicki Schreck
- Theme music composer: Jerrold Immel
- Composer: Jerrold Immel
- Country of origin: United States
- Original language: English
- No. of seasons: 3
- No. of episodes: 28 + movie (list of episodes)

Production
- Production company: MGM Television

Original release
- Network: ABC
- Release: January 19, 1976 – April 23, 1979

How the West Was Won is an American Western television series starring James Arness, Eva Marie Saint, Fionnula Flanagan, Bruce Boxleitner, and Richard Kiley. Loosely based on the 1962 Cinerama film of the same name, it began with a two-hour television film, The Macahans, in 1976, followed by a mini-series in 1977, and a regular series in 1978 and 1979.

The show was a great success in Europe, apparently finding a larger and more lasting audience there than in the United States. It has been rebroadcast many times on various European networks, e.g. in France, Germany, Italy, Norway and Sweden, and has built a cult following. It was released on DVD in Europe in November 2009.

A sequence of paintings by Charles Marion Russell is shown during the end credits.

== Episodes ==
Season	Episodes	Originally released	
Season	Episodes	First released	Last released
Movie		January 19, 1976	
1	3	February 6, 1977	February 20, 1977
2	14	February 12, 1978	May 21, 1978
3	11	January 15, 1979	April 23, 1979

== Plot ==
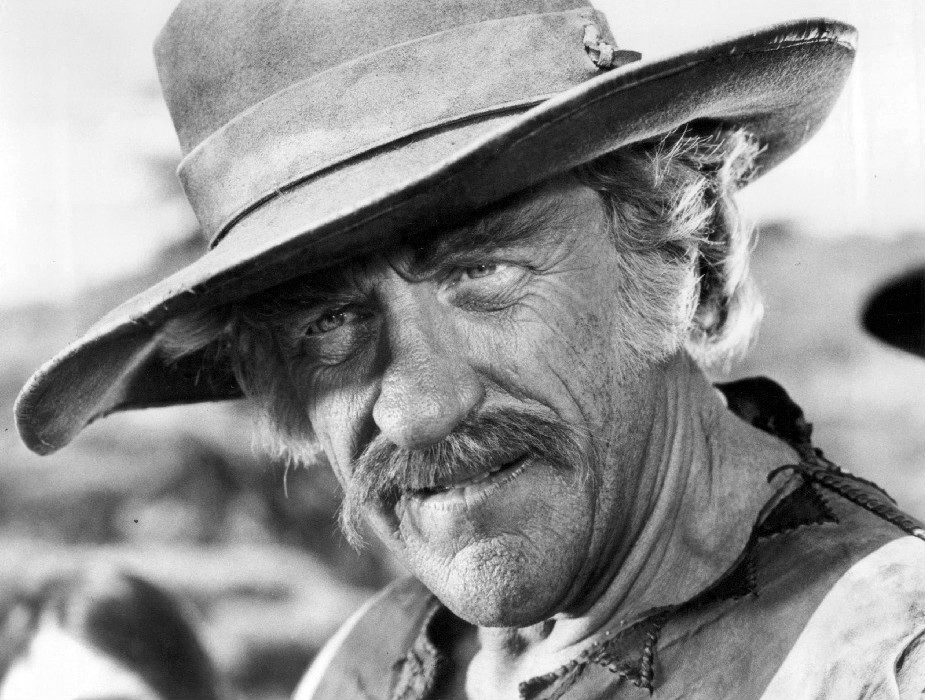
James Arness as Zeb Macahan

Zebulon Macahan is a well-known mountain man and scout working for the U.S. Army in the Indian Territories. The pilot movie shows Zeb not having seen his family for ten years and with the Civil War approaching, deciding to visit them in Manassas, Virginia. Because war comes too close to home, Zeb's sister-in-law, Kate, convinces her husband, Zeb's brother Tim, to move their two sons, Seth and Jed (renamed Luke and Josh in the remaining episodes) and two daughters (Jessie and Laura) out west.

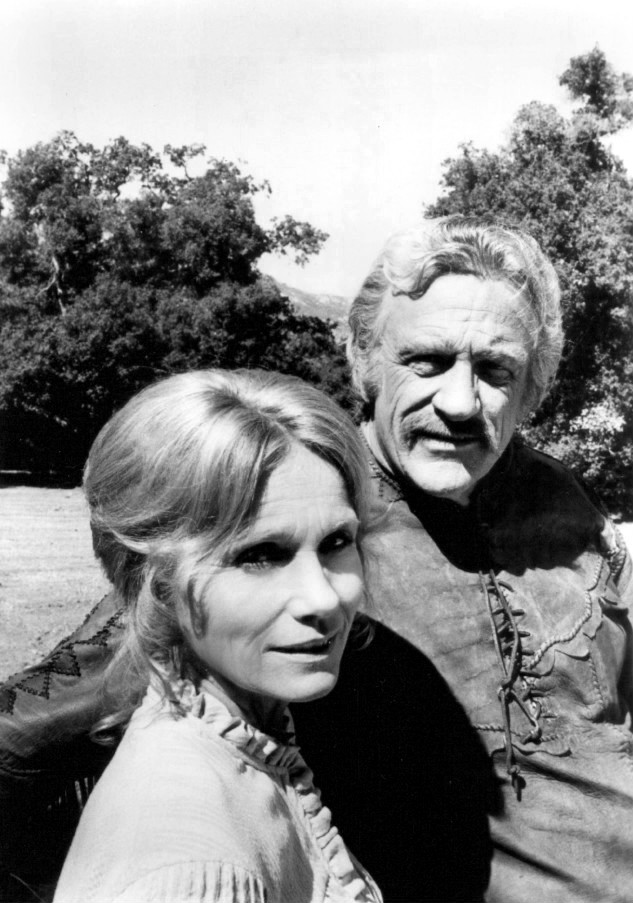
Eva Marie Saint and James Arness as Kate and Zeb Macahan

There the family learns that the first battle of the war is likely to occur at Bull Run, near Zeb and Tim's parents' home. Tim returns to Virginia while the family winters in the Indian Territories. Zeb learns that a friend has been murdered by Dutton, who escaped from an Army guardhouse he was in for murdering innocent Indians. Knowing that Dutton swore vengeance on him and fearing for his family, Zeb attempts to intercept Dutton before he can reach the Macahan homestead. Luke heads east to look for his father and grandparents but gets home, only to find his grandparents were killed by artillery fire that struck their home during the First Battle of Bull Run. He learns that his father was conscripted into a unit of the Union Army heading for Tennessee to the Battle of Shiloh. Luke is also conscripted at Shiloh but is wounded and taken to a field aid station, where he finds his mortally-wounded father dying. Luke tells his superiors that he will no longer serve and is about to be shot as a deserter when shelling nearly kills his entire platoon. Escaping on foot, he reaches Missouri, finding the abandoned horse of a dead soldier and rides the horse until a local sheriff, Martin Stillman, and his men find Luke, accusing him of horse thievery. Luke tries to explain that he is a former Union soldier who found the horse but Stillman and his men, being Confederate sympathizers, try to lynch him. Luke escapes, severely wounding Stillman's arm in the process.

Meanwhile, Zeb tracks down and kills Dutton using his Hawken rifle. Luke arrives at the family homestead near the Platte River in western Nebraska and tells his mother Kate not only about Tim's death, but also that he is now an Army deserter as well as an outlaw in Missouri and must leave and be on the run. The pilot episode ends with Luke riding off. The series continues when after a period of relative quiet, a bounty hunter named Captain Grey, an Army provost marshal pursuing Union soldiers accused of desertion, arrives at the homestead to arrest Luke. Zeb slashes Grey's arm using his Bowie knife and Grey swears he will return. Grey continues to pursue Luke but the war ends and the government grants amnesty to all alleged deserters. Grey resigns his Army commission but keeps tracking Luke due to the reward on him in Missouri over the incident with the sheriff. Grey breaks into the Macahan house and mother Kate fatally shoots him. The first season ends with the family leaving the homestead to travel west to Oregon, which was their original intention.

The second season starts with Kate having died in a barn fire. Her sister, a wealthy widow named Molly Culhane, arrives from Chicago to reunite with her only remaining family. Stillman, the former Missouri sheriff, is now a wealthy businessman with a crippled arm and is obsessed with revenge against Luke, but is killed by Zeb in a gunfight. By this time, Luke has gained a reputation as a skilled gunfighter and is continually fleeing pursuit, having not been cleared of the Missouri charges, but the reward for Luke's arrest is paid, after Luke is apprehended for the reward, but he is later released before he can be taken to Missouri. The remainder of the series involves Zeb and the family building their ranch in the Grand Tetons area of Wyoming.

== Cast ==
- James Arness as Zebulon "Zeb" Macahan
- Bruce Boxleitner as Luke "Seth" Macahan
- William Kirby Cullen as Josh "Jed" Macahan
- Fionnula Flanagan as Molly Culhane
- Kathryn Holcomb as Laura Macahan
- Richard Kiley as Timothy "Tim" Macahan
- Jared Martin as Frank Grayson
- Eva Marie Saint as Katherine "Kate" Macahan
- Vicki Schreck as Jessica "Jessie" Macahan
- Harris Yulin as Deek Peasley
- William Conrad as the Narrator

In first season, Tim's sons have different names than in the rest of the series. Bruce Boxleitner's character was renamed "Luke", and William Kirby Cullen's character renamed "Josh".

Guest stars included Ricardo Montalbán as Satangkai, a chief of the Sioux Nation, Ron Hayes as Sheriff Pinter, Med Flory (three episodes as a sheriff), Rodolfo Hoyos Jr., Harry Lauter as Sheriff Charlie Benton, Gregg Palmer as Loman, Tom Simcox as Marshal Logan, Read Morgan as Morton in "The Slavers", and John M. Pickard as Colonel Caine, James Stephens as C. L. Bradley (the pilot and two episodes), and Jim Turner (three episodes).

Other guest stars include Richard Basehart, Brian Keith, Cameron Mitchell, Morgan Woodward, Ken Curtis, Michael Conrad, Christopher Lee, Britt Lind (Luke's first season girlfriend), Elyssa Davalos (Luke's second season girlfriend), Tim Matheson, John Crawford, Wright King, John Dehner, Lloyd Bridges (Elyssa Davalos's sheriff father), Don Murray (Kate's first season love interest), Royal Dano (Britt Lind's father), Parley Baer, William Shatner (a blind ex-US Cavalry officer who is the husband of a long ago female friend of Zeb Macahan), Anthony Zerbe (bounty hunter, primary first season villain), Woody Strode (Indian chief), David Huddleston with Gene Evans and Jack Elam (both mountain men).

== Home media ==
How the West was Won has been released in Scandinavia as Familjen Macahan(Sweden) and Familien Macahan(Norway)(Macahan Family) in 5 boxes:

- Box 1 - November 25, 2009 (4 episodes including Pilot)
- Box 2 - February 24, 2010 (5 episodes)
- Box 3 - May 12, 2010 (5 episodes)
- Box 4 - September 8, 2010 (5 episodes)
- Box 5 - December 1, 2010 (6 episodes).

The series was remastered and released in 2012, also in 5 boxes (Box 1 – August 31; Boxes 2-5 - September 25), as well as a complete box November 21, 2012.

Warner Home Video has released the first two seasons on DVD in Region 1; season 1 was released on July 9, 2013, followed by season 2 on July 15, 2014. The third and final season was released by Warner Archive as an MOD DVD on April 19, 2016.

The second season's broadcast consisted of 14 episodes, with the episodes 1, 2, and 14 being for a three hour time slot, while the remaining 11 episodes for a 60 minute window. In international syndication those 14 episodes were re-cut to 10 episodes somewhat in equal length around 90 minutes each.

== Novelization ==
In January 1978, a nearly 400-page paperback novelization of a number of early episodes, written by Lou Cameron, was published by Ballantine Books. A paperback writer who won a Western Writers of America Spur Award for his novel The Spirit Horses, Cameron's novelization adapted teleplays and screen stories by Calvin Clements, Colley Cibber, Howard Fast, William Kelley, John Mantley, Katharyn Michaelian, Jack Miller and Earl W. Wallace. The novel, sharing the title of the series, is not to be confused with the identically titled 1962 feature film which was itself adapted into a novel by Louis L'Amour.
