= Earl W. Wallace =

American screenwriter (1942 – 2018)

- Born: October 23, 1942; California, U.S.
- Died: May 12, 2018 (aged 75)
- Occupation: Screenwriter
- Notable work: Witness
- Spouse: Pamela Wallace
- Awards: See below

Earl W. Wallace (October 23, 1942 – May 12, 2018) was an American screenwriter. He was known for his work on various television series and for writing the 1985 film Witness. The latter earned him multiple accolades, including the Academy Award for Best Original Screenplay.

== Life and career ==
Prior to Wallace's screenwriting career, he was city editor of a regional newspaper, the Thousand Oaks Acorn. He had enrolled in a screenwriting class where the assignments included the creation of an original episode of the popular television Western Gunsmoke. The instructor submitted Wallace's teleplay to the Gunsmoke writing staff, who accepted it and ran it as an episode. They invited Wallace to submit further work and eventually offered him a regular position on their writing staff. When the show ended in its 20th season, Wallace was its head writer.

Wallace wrote the teleplay for the pilot of the ill-fated 1979 TV series Supertrain and co-wrote the story with Donald E. Westlake; Wallace and Westlake shared "created by" credit.

Wallace adapted the Herman Wouk novel War and Remembrance for a twelve-part miniseries broadcast by ABC. He also wrote episodes of How the West Was Won, Seven Brides for Seven Brothers, and Quinn Martin's Tales of the Unexpected, and several television movies, including Wild and Wooly, If These Walls Could Talk, A Murderous Affair: The Carolyn Warmus Story, and Rose Hill.

Wallace's work on Gunsmoke later inspired him, along with co-writers Pamela Wallace (his wife) and William Kelley, to develop the screenplay for the 1985 film Witness. For his work on Witness, Wallace won the Academy Award for Best Original Screenplay, the Writers Guild of America Award for Best Original Screenplay, and the Edgar Award for Best Motion Picture Screenplay and was nominated for the Golden Globe Award for Best Screenplay and the BAFTA Award for Best Original Screenplay.

== Personal life ==
Wallace was married to screenwriter and novelist Pamela Wallace (b. 1949), who was also his longtime professional partner.

=== Death ===
Wallace died in 2018.

== Filmography ==
=== Film ===
Year	Title	Director	Notes
1985	Witness	Peter Weir	Co-writer with William Kelley
1996	The Song of Hiawatha	Jeffrey Shore	

=== Television ===
Year	Title	Functioned as			Notes
Year	Title	Creator	Writer	Other	Notes
1974–75	Gunsmoke	No	Yes	No	7 episodes
1975–76	Bronk	No	Yes	No	Exec. story consultant; 15 episodes Writer; 1 episode
1976	The Blue Knight	No	Yes	No	1 episode
1976	Baretta	No	Yes	No	1 episode
1976	The Quest	No	Yes	No	1 episode
1977	Most Wanted	No	No	Yes	Exec. story editor
1977	Tales of the Unexpected	No	Yes	No	1 episode
1977–79	How the West Was Won	No	Yes	No	19 episodes
1979	Supertrain	Yes	Yes	No	Writer; 1 episode
1983	Seven Brides for Seven Brothers	No	Yes	No	1 episode
1983–84	For Love and Honor	No	Yes	No	4 episodes
1989	Gideon Oliver	No	Yes	No	1 episode

==== TV films, miniseries, and specials ====
Year	Title	Functioned as			Notes
Year	Title	Creator	Writer	Other	Notes
1977	Curse of the Black Widow	No	Yes	No	
1978	Wild and Wooly	No	Yes	No	
1979	The Last Ride of the Dalton Gang	No	Yes	No	
1981	She's in the Army Now	No	Yes	No	
1982	The Wild Women of Chastity Gulch	No	Yes	No	
1983	The Winds of War	No	No	Yes	Story editor
1988–89	War and Remembrance	No	Yes	No	
1990	Gunsmoke: The Last Apache	No	Yes	No	
1992	Gunsmoke: To the Last Man	No	Yes	No	
1992	A Murderous Affair	No	Yes	No	
1993	The Broken Chain	No	Yes	No	
1996	If These Walls Could Talk	No	Story	No	Segment: "1952"
1997	Rose Hill	No	Yes	No	
1997	Borrowed Hearts	No	Yes	No	
2000	If These Walls Could Talk 2	Yes	No	No	

== Awards and nominations ==
Institution	Year	Category	Work	Result
Academy Awards	1986	Best Original Screenplay	Witness	Won
British Academy Film Awards	1986	Best Original Screenplay	Witness	Nominated
Edgar Awards	1986	Best Motion Picture Screenplay	Witness	Won
Golden Globe Awards	1986	Best Screenplay	Witness	Nominated
Western Writers of America	1979	Best TV Script	How the West Was Won	Won
Writers Guild of America	1986	Best Original Screenplay	Witness	Won

== Sources ==
- Feldman, Edward S. (2005). Tell Me How You Love the Picture. New York: St. Martin's Press. ISBN 978-0-312-34801-4.
- McGivern, Alicia (March 2020). "Witness: A Study Guide" (PDF). IFI Education. Irish Film Institute. Archived (PDF) from the original on May 27, 2021.
