= John H. Anderson (set decorator) =

American set decorator

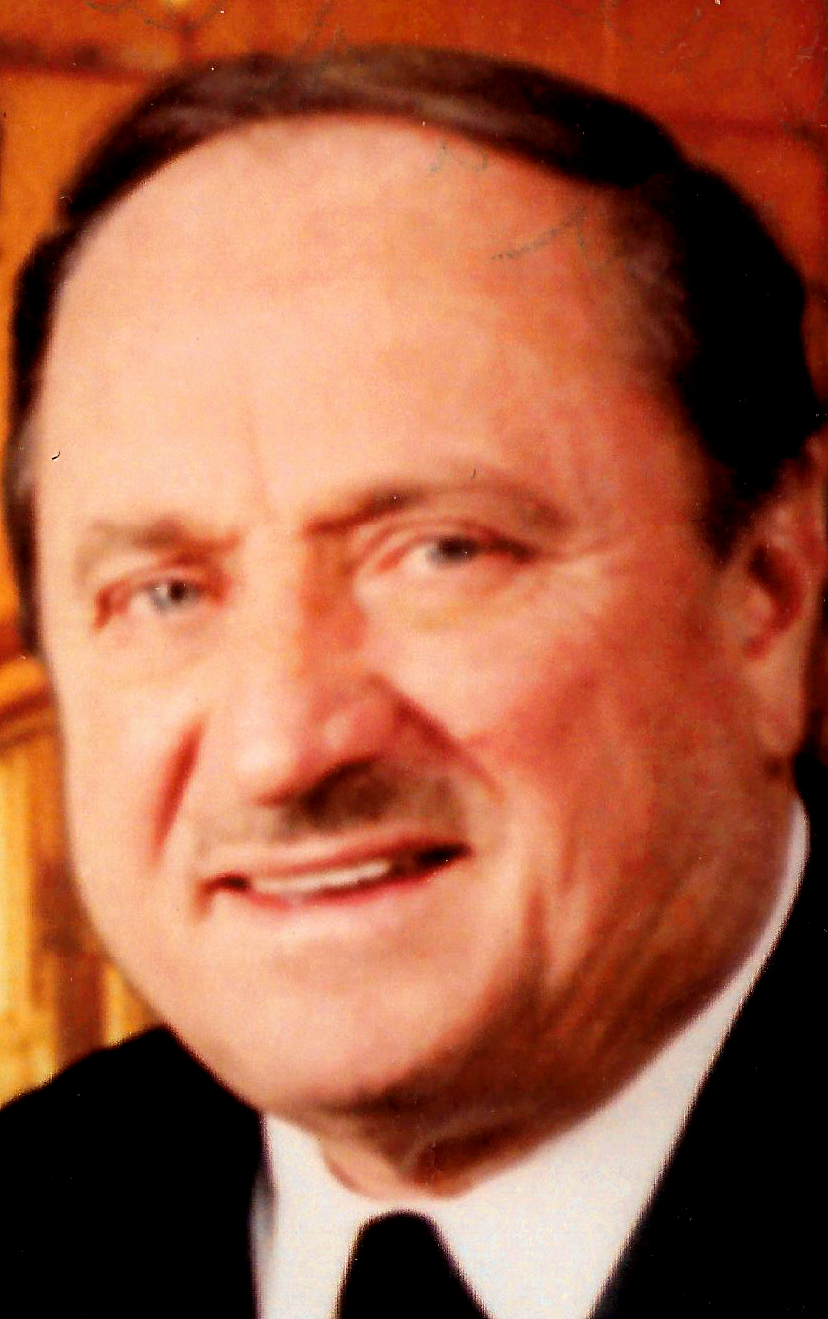
- Born: 1920
- Died: 2008 (aged 87–88)
- Occupations: Assistant Director, Second Unit Director and Set decorator
- Years active: 1974-2003

John H. Anderson was an American assistant director, second unit director and often part of the art department on films that he worked on, primarily as set decorator. He was nominated for an Academy Award in the category Best Art Direction for the film Witness.

== Selected filmography ==
- Witness (1985)
