= Keats and His Nightingale: A Blind Date =

1985 film

- Directed by: Jim Wolpaw
- Written by: Jim Wolpaw
- Produced by: Michael Crowley; Jim Wolpaw
- Production company: Rhode Island Council for the Humanities
- Distributed by: Picture Start
- Release date: 1985
- Country: United States
- Language: English

Keats and His Nightingale: A Blind Date is a 1985 American short documentary film directed by Jim Wolpaw. It was nominated for an Academy Award for Best Documentary Short.
