= Pamela Wallace =

American screenwriter and author

- Born: 1949 (age 76–77); Exeter, California
- Occupations: Screenwriter, novelist
- Spouse: Earl W. Wallace (died 2018)
- Writing career
- Pen name: Dianne King, Pamela Simpson
- Period: 1980s–present
- Genre: Romance

Pamela Wallace (born 1949 in Exeter, California) is an American screenwriter and author. She won an Oscar for co-writing the screenplay for the movie Witness. Wallace has also written 25 romance novels, under her own name and the pseudonyms Pamela Simpson and Dianne King.

== Screenwriting ==
=== Witness ===
The original script for Witness was conceived by Pamela Wallace in the 1970s and was inspired by an episode of the western drama series Gunsmoke. The idea was turned into a screenplay by her husband Earl W. Wallace and his colleague William Kelley in 1983. The script was rejected multiple times but was finally purchased by producer Edward S. Feldman. The resulting film, Witness, was released in 1985 and starred Harrison Ford and Kelly McGillis. The following year, Wallace received the Academy Award for Best Original Screenplay along with William Kelley and Earl W. Wallace for Witness. The script also won awards from the Mystery Writers of America and the Writers Guild of America. The Writers Guild later named Witness to their list of the Top 101 Greatest Scripts.

=== Later work ===
In the late 1980s Wallace collaborated with fellow screenwriter Madeline Dimaggio on a screenplay they called If The Shoe Fits. This was made into a low-budget movie that barely resembled their script. Wallace was given the opportunity to remove her name from the movie credits, but she chose to keep the credit for her resume despite her dislike of the movie.

By the late 1990s Wallace was once again writing successful screenplays. She wrote the first segment of the award-winning 1996 HBO movie, If These Walls Could Talk. The following year, Borrowed Hearts became one of the highest-rated CBS movies.

Wallace also adapted one of her own novels, Straight From the Heart into a screenplay for Hallmark Channel. The resulting movie became the highest-rated film for the network in 2003. She also penned the screenplay for the 2006 Hallmark Channel movie Though None Go with Me, starring Cheryl Ladd. She has written several other Hallmark Channel and Lifetime Network movies.

== Novels ==
Wallace has written 25 romance novels. These have been published under her own name, as well as the pseudonyms Dianne King and Pamela Simpson. An additional pen name, Pamela Simpson, came about through a collaboration with Carla Simpson, who had previously written eleven historical romance novels under the pseudonym Quinn Taylor Evans. In the early 1990s the pair completed three contemporary romantic suspense novels. The novels were translated into seven languages. Two of them, Fortune's Child and Partners in Time, were optioned for film.

In 2000 Wallace wrote a non-fiction book called You Can Write a Screenplay. Drawing on her own experiences in Hollywood, the book walked readers through the entire screenwriting process, beginning with the initial idea. It provided tips for writing the screenplay, as well as advice on how to sell the completed work.

== Producer ==
She has served as an executive producer for the cable television series Beyond the Break, as well as for the television movies Last Chance Cafe and A Very Merry Daughter of the Bride.

== Filmography ==
- Love's Unending Legacy (2007) (TV)
- Last Chance Cafe (2006) (TV)
- Though None Go with Me (2006) (TV)
- Meet the Santas (2005) (TV)
- Single Santa Seeks Mrs. Claus (2004) (TV)
- Straight From the Heart (2003) (TV)
- Borrowed Hearts (1997) (TV)
- Alibi (1997) (TV)
- If These Walls Could Talk (1996) (TV) (segment "1952")
- A Murderous Affair: The Carolyn Warmus Story (1992) (TV)
- If the Shoe Fits (1990) (TV)
- Tears in the Rain (1988) (TV)
- Witness (1985)

== Selected bibliography ==
=== Fiction ===
- Dream Lost, Dreams Found
- Love with the Perfect Stranger
- Straight From the Heart
- Tears in the Rain

==== as Pamela Simpson ====
- Fortune's Child (with Carla Simpson)
- Partners in Time (with Carla Simpson)

=== Nonfiction ===
- You Can Write a Screenplay (2000)

== Sources ==
- Feldman, Edward S. (2005). Tell Me How You Love the Picture. New York: St. Martin's Press. ISBN 978-0-312-34801-4.
- McGivern, Alicia (March 2020). "Witness: A Study Guide" (PDF). IFI Education. Irish Film Institute. Archived (PDF) from the original on May 27, 2021.
