= William Kelley (screenwriter) =

American screenwriter and producer (1929–2003)

- Born: May 27, 1929; New York City, U.S.
- Died: February 3, 2003 (aged 73); Bishop, California, U.S.
- Education: Villanova University; Brown University; Harvard Grad School
- Occupations: Screenwriter; television and film producer
- Spouse: Cornelia Ann Chamberlin Kelley (m. 1954)
- Children: 2
- Parent(s): Thomas Edward Kelley; Alethia Waldegrave
- Writing career
- Notable awards: Academy Award for Best Original Screenplay (1985)

William Kelley (May 27, 1929 – February 3, 2003) was an American screenwriter and producer for television and film who is best known for his work on the Peter Weir-directed film Witness (1985), which starred Harrison Ford and Kelly McGillis, that earned him an Academy Award along with his co-writers Earl W. Wallace and Pamela Wallace.

== Early life and education ==
Kelley was born on May 27, 1929, to Thomas Edward and Alethia (née Waldegrave) Kelley (both lawyers) in Staten Island, New York, a prominent political family. Kelley served in the United States Air Force in the late 1940s. He studied for the priesthood for three years in the early 1950s at Villanova University, but then transferred to Brown University, where he graduated Phi Beta Kappa with a Bachelor's degree in English Literature in 1955. He then went to Harvard Grad School for two years and earned a master's degree in Irish literature.

== Career ==
Kelley got his first writing credit in 1955, when he wrote an episode of the Marshall Dillon radio show. Two years later Kelley became an editor at the Doubleday publishing company's New York offices. He also worked from 1961 to 1962 as an editor for McGraw-Hill Books. While at Doubleday he had his first novel, Gemini, published in 1959; it became a bestseller. He left Doubleday in 1961 to work as a fiction editor at McGraw-Hill Books and later Simon & Schuster.

While continuing to write novels such as The God Hunters in 1964, he started writing for television beginning with an episode of the show Route 66. He would go on to earn more than 150 credits in television including episodes of Judd for the Defense, Gunsmoke, Bonanza, Kung Fu, Serpico, Petrocelli and Fantasy Island. He also wrote for the miniseries How the West Was Won and wrote TV movies, including The Winds of Kitty Hawk, The Demon Murder Case and The Blue Lightning which he also co-produced. He had previously been producer on five episodes of The Dukes of Hazzard in 1979.

=== Witness ===
Producer Edward S. Feldman, who was in a "first-look" development deal with 20th Century Fox in the mid-1980s, first received the screenplay for Witness which had been written in 1983 by Kelley and Earl W. Wallace. Originally entitled Called Home (which is the Amish term for death), it ran for 182 pages, the equivalent of three hours of screen time. The script, which had been circulating in Hollywood for several years, had been inspired by an episode of Gunsmoke which Kelley and had written in the 1970s, and was based upon an idea by Wallace's wife, novelist Pamela Wallace.

Feldman liked the concept, but felt too much of the script was devoted to Amish traditions, diluting the thriller aspects of the story. He offered Kelley and Wallace $25,000 for a one-year option and one rewrite, and an additional $225,000 if the film actually were made. They submitted the revised screenplay in less than six weeks, and Feldman delivered it to Fox. Joe Wizan, the studio's head of production, rejected it with the statement that Fox did not make "rural movies".

Feldman sent the screenplay to Harrison Ford's agent Phil Gersh, who contacted the producer four days later and advised him his client was willing to commit to the film. Certain the attachment of a major star would change Wizan's mind, Feldman approached him once again, but Wizan insisted that as much as the studio liked Ford, they still were not interested in making a "rural movie."

Feldman sent the screenplay to numerous studios, and was rejected by all of them, until Paramount Pictures finally expressed interest. Feldman's first choice of director was Peter Weir, but he was involved in preproduction work for The Mosquito Coast and passed on the project. John Badham dismissed it as "just another cop movie", and others Feldman approached either were committed to other projects or had no interest. Then, as financial backing for The Mosquito Coast fell through, Weir became free to direct Witness, which was his first American film. Starting the film immediately was imperative, because a Directors Guild of America strike was looming.

The film was eventually released in February 1985 and would become both a critical and box-office success earning Wallace and Kelley a Writers Guild of America award and the 1986 original screenplay Oscar which was shared with Wallace's wife Pamela.

== Personal life and death ==
Kelly married his wife Cornelia Ann "Nina" née Chamberlin Kelley in September 1954 and they had two children. He died of cancer on February 3, 2003, in his home in Bishop, California, shortly after his final novel, A Servant of Slaves: The Life of Henriette Delille was published.

== Books ==
- Geminie
- The God Hunters

== Sources ==
- Feldman, Edward S. (2005). Tell Me How You Love the Picture. New York: St. Martin's Press. ISBN 978-0-312-34801-4.
- McGivern, Alicia (March 2020). "Witness: A Study Guide" (PDF). IFI Education. Irish Film Institute. Archived (PDF) from the original on May 27, 2021.
