= List of LGBTQ Academy Award winners and nominees =

This list details the lesbian, gay, bisexual, transgender, and queer people who have been nominated for or received Academy Awards and/or cis-hetero actors who have been nominated for or won for playing queer characters. Individuals are identified as queer, though they may not have publicly or personally identified at the time of their nomination.

== Best Actor in a Leading Role ==
=== Confirmed individuals ===
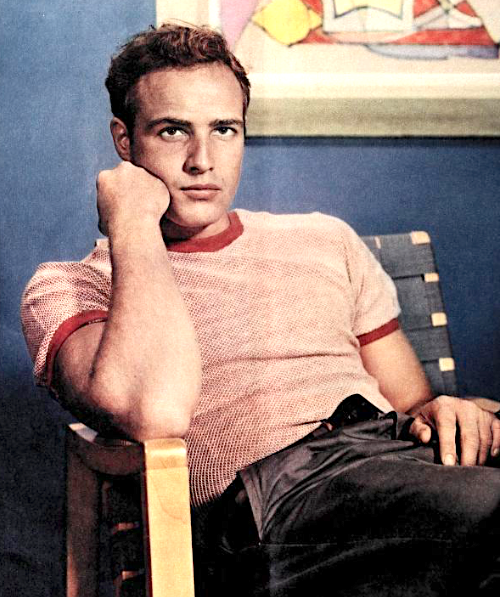
Marlon Brando, bisexual, winner of 2 Oscars, nominated for 8.

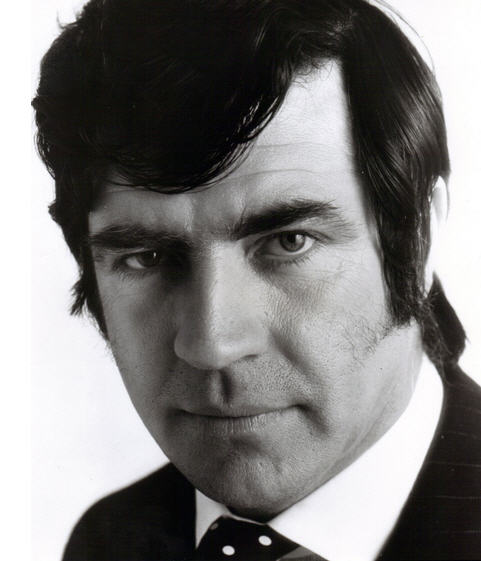
Sir Alan Bates, bisexual, nominated for 1 Oscar.

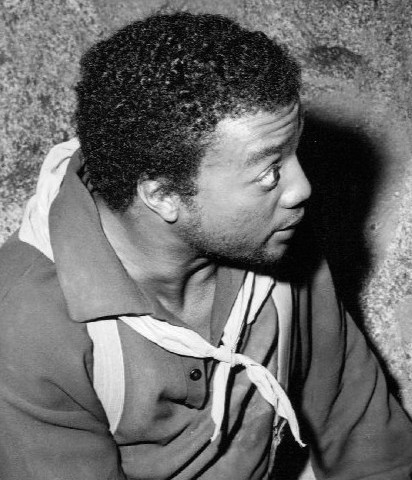
Paul Winfield, gay, nominated for 1 Oscar.

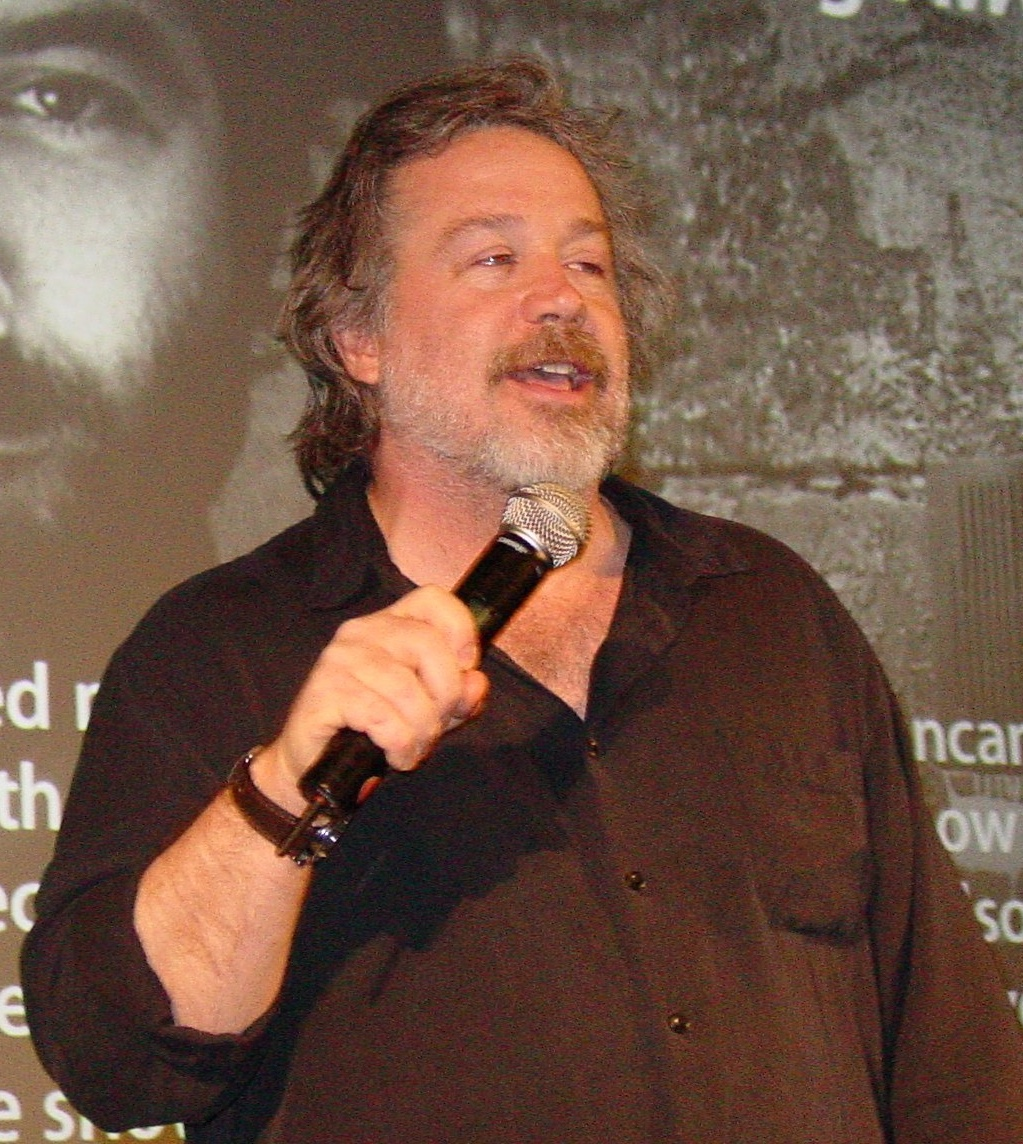
Tom Hulce, gay, nominated for 1 Oscar.

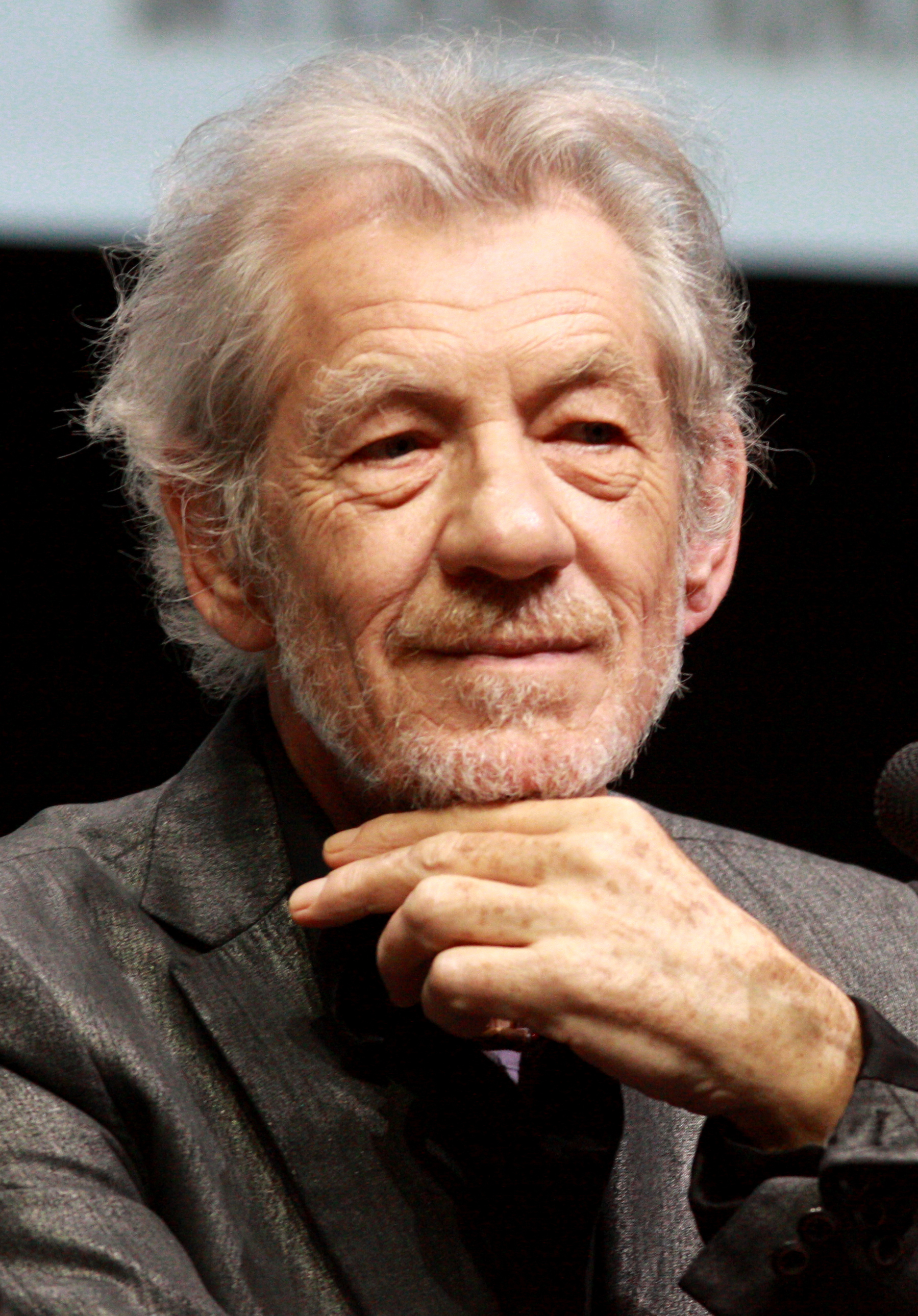
Sir Ian McKellen, gay, nominated for 2 Oscars.

Best Actor in a Leading Role
| Year | Name | Film | Role | Status | Actor's Demographic | Out at the time? | Observation | Reference |
| 1951 | Marlon Brando | A Streetcar Named Desire | Stanley Kowalski | Nominated | Cisgender Bisexual | No | Brando spoke more openly on his bisexuality later on in life, including a list of affairs he had with other celebrities, both men and women. On his greatest love affair, he [stated], “If Wally Cox had been a woman, I would have married him and we would have lived happily ever after.“ | |
| 1952 | Marlon Brando | Viva Zapata! | Emiliano Zapata | Nominated | Cisgender Bisexual | No | Brando spoke more openly on his bisexuality later on in life, including a list of affairs he had with other celebrities, both men and women. On his greatest love affair, he [stated], “If Wally Cox had been a woman, I would have married him and we would have lived happily ever after.“ | |
| 1952 | Alec Guinness | The Lavender Hill Mob | Henry "Dutch" Holland | Nominated | Cisgender Bisexual | No | Throughout his entire life, Guinness remained closeted to the public, but privately was known to have had a number of male lovers. Family and friends were aware of his bisexuality throughout his life, but never brought it up, as he was known to dislike talking about it. After his death, his close friends and family members confirmed he was bisexual. | |
| 1953 | Marlon Brando | Julius Caesar | Mark Antony | Nominated | Cisgender Bisexual | No | (See note above) | |
| 1954 | Marlon Brando | On the Waterfront | Terry Malloy | Won | Cisgender Bisexual | No | (See note above) | |
| 1957 | Marlon Brando | Sayonara | Major Lloyd 'Ace' Gruver, USAF | Nominated | Cisgender Bisexual | No | (See note above) | |
| 1957 | Alec Guinness | The Bridge on the River Kwai | Colonel Nicholson | Won | Cisgender Bisexual | No | (See note above) | |
| 1968 | Alan Bates | The Fixer | Yakov Bok | Nominated | Cisgender Bisexual | No | Bates was attached to several men privately, behind the heterosexual marriage facade, such as ice skater, John Curry, and British TV sleuth, Peter Wyngarde. | |
| 1972 | Marlon Brando | The Godfather | Vito Corleone | Won (declined) | Cisgender Bisexual | No | Brando did not attend the ceremony, choosing instead to have himself represented by Sacheen Littlefeather (a.k.a. Maria Cruz), who identified as Apache Native American. She stated that Brando refused the award due to the poor treatment of American Indians in entertainment, as well as the recent Wounded Knee Occupation. | |
| 1972 | Paul Winfield | Sounder | Nathan Lee Morgan | Nominated | Cisgender Homosexual | Yes | First Black gay actor nominated in an acting category. In relationship with architect Charles Gillan Jr., until his 2002 death. Also, he was the first openly gay actor to be nominated for Best Actor and the first openly gay actor nominated in any category to have been out on their own terms. | |
| 1973 | Marlon Brando | Last Tango in Paris | Paul | Nominated | Cisgender Bisexual | No | (See note above) | |
| 1984 | Tom Hulce | Amadeus | Wolfgang Amadeus Mozart | Nominated | Cisgender Homosexual | No | In an interview with Seattle Gay News, Tom Hulce acknowledged his status as a gay actor, although he emphasized the word "actor" is less applicable due to inactivity. | |
| 1994 | Nigel Hawthorne | The Madness of King George | King George III of the United Kingdom | Nominated | Cisgender Homosexual | Yes (outed) | Hawthorne was outed as gay in 1995 due to the attention his nomination at the 67th Academy Awards had gathered, but nonetheless he attended the ceremony with his long-time partner Trevor Bentham. He also spoke openly about his sexuality in interviews and in his autobiography Straight Face. | |
| 1998 | Ian McKellen | Gods and Monsters | James Whale | Nominated | Cisgender Homosexual | Yes | For each of his nominations (Gods and Monsters in 1998 and The Lord of the Rings: The Fellowship of the Ring in 2001), the star said he had speeches prepared beginning with the line: "'I’m proud to be the first openly gay man to win the Oscar.' I’ve had to put it back in my pocket twice." | |
| 1999 | Kevin Spacey | American Beauty | Lester Burnham | Won | Cisgender Homosexual | No | Spacey came out as a gay man in his statement addressing a sexual misconduct accusation by actor Anthony Rapp in 2017. | |
| 2023 | Colman Domingo | Rustin | Bayard Rustin | Nominated | Cisgender Homosexual | Yes | First openly gay Black and Afro-Latino actor to be nominated for Best Actor. | |
| 2024 | Colman Domingo | Sing Sing | John "Divine G" Whitfield | Nominated | Cisgender Homosexual | Yes | First openly gay Black and Afro-Latino actor to be nominated for Best Actor. | |

=== Speculated to be LGBTQ ===
The following list is composed of actors who have been claimed to be LGBT by others. They have been outed by a third party either while alive or after their death. However, they never publicly came out.

Best Actor in a Leading Role
| Year | Name | Film | Role | Status | Alleged Demographic | Reference |
| 1933 | Charles Laughton | The Private Life of Henry VIII | King Henry VIII of England | Won | Bisexual | |
| 1935 | Charles Laughton | Mutiny on the Bounty | Vice-Admiral William Bligh | Nominated | Bisexual | |
| 1936 | Spencer Tracy | San Francisco | Father Tim Mullin | Nominated | Gay or Bisexual | |
| 1937 | Spencer Tracy | Captains Courageous | Manuel Fidello | Won | Gay or Bisexual | |
| 1938 | Spencer Tracy | Boys Town | (Monsignor) Father Edward J. Flanagan | Won | Gay or Bisexual | |
| 1941 | Cary Grant | Penny Serenade | Roger Adams | Nominated | Gay or Bisexual | |
| 1942 | Monty Woolley | The Pied Piper | Howard | Nominated | Gay | |
| 1944 | Cary Grant | None but the Lonely Heart | Ernie Mott | Nominated | Gay or Bisexual | |
| 1947 | Michael Redgrave | Mourning Becomes Electra | Orin Mannon | Nominated | Bisexual | |
| 1948 | Montgomery Clift | The Search | Ralph 'Steve' Stevenson | Nominated | Bisexual | |
| 1948 | Clifton Webb | Sitting Pretty | Lynn Aloysius Belvedere | Nominated | Gay | |
| 1950 | Spencer Tracy | Father of the Bride | Stanley T. Banks | Nominated | Gay or Bisexual | |
| 1951 | Montgomery Clift | A Place in the Sun | George Eastman | Nominated | Bisexual | |
| 1953 | Montgomery Clift | From Here to Eternity | Pvt. Robert E. Lee 'Prew' Prewitt | Nominated | Bisexual | |
| 1955 | James Dean | East of Eden | Caleb Trask | Nominated | Gay or Bisexual | |
| 1955 | Spencer Tracy | Bad Day at Black Rock | John J. Macreedy | Nominated | Gay or Bisexual | |
| 1956 | James Dean | Giant | Jett Rink | Nominated | Gay or Bisexual | |
| 1956 | Rock Hudson | Giant | Jordan 'Bick' Benedict, Jr. | Nominated | Gay | |
| 1957 | Charles Laughton | Witness for the Prosecution | Sir Wilfrid Robarts, Q.C. | Nominated | Bisexual | |
| 1958 | Spencer Tracy | The Old Man and the Sea | The Old Man (Narrator) | Nominated | Gay or Bisexual | |
| 1960 | Spencer Tracy | Inherit the Wind | Henry Drummond | Nominated | Gay or Bisexual | |
| 1961 | Spencer Tracy | Judgment at Nuremberg | Chief Judge Dan Haywood | Nominated | Gay or Bisexual | |
| 1967 | Spencer Tracy | Guess Who's Coming to Dinner? | Matt Drayton | Nominated | Gay or Bisexual | |

=== Performances of LGBTQ Characters Nominated for or Awarded Best Actor in a Leading Role ===
Performances of LGBTQ Characters Nominated for or Awarded Best Actor in a Leading Role
| Year | Film | Role | Character's Demographic | Actor | Actor's Demographic | Status | References |
| 1958 | Cat on a Hot Tin Roof | 'Brick' Pollitt | Bi-curious | Paul Newman | Cisgender Heterosexual | Nominated | |
| 1962 | Lawrence of Arabia | T. E. Lawrence | Unknown | Peter O'Toole | Cisgender Heterosexual | Nominated | |
| 1971 | Sunday Bloody Sunday | Dr. Daniel Hirsh | Gay | Peter Finch | Cisgender Heterosexual | Nominated | |
| 1975 | Dog Day Afternoon | Sonny Wortzik | Bisexual | Al Pacino | Cisgender Heterosexual | Nominated | |
| 1977 | A Special Day | Gabriele | Gay | Marcello Mastroianni | Cisgender Heterosexual | Nominated | |
| 1983 | The Dresser | Norman | Gay | Tom Courtenay | Cisgender Heterosexual | Nominated | |
| 1985 | Kiss of the Spider Woman | Luis Molina | Gay (& Genderqueer) | William Hurt | Cisgender Heterosexual | Won | |
| 1993 | Philadelphia | Andrew 'Andy' Beckett | Gay | Tom Hanks | Cisgender Heterosexual | Won | |
| 1998 | Gods and Monsters | James Whale | Gay | Ian McKellen | Cisgender Homosexual | Nominated | |
| 2000 | Before Night Falls | Reinaldo Arenas | Gay | Javier Bardem | Cisgender Heterosexual | Nominated | |
| 2005 | Brokeback Mountain | Ennis Del Mar | Gay or Bisexual | Heath Ledger | Cisgender Heterosexual | Nominated | |
| 2005 | Capote | Truman Capote | Gay | Philip Seymour Hoffman | Cisgender Heterosexual | Won | |
| 2008 | Milk | Harvey Milk | Gay | Sean Penn | Cisgender Heterosexual | Won | |
| 2009 | A Single Man | George Falconer | Gay | Colin Firth | Cisgender Heterosexual | Nominated | |
| 2014 | The Imitation Game | Alan Turing | Gay | Benedict Cumberbatch | Cisgender Heterosexual | Nominated | |
| 2015 | The Danish Girl | Lili Elbe | Transgender woman | Eddie Redmayne | Cisgender Heterosexual | Nominated | |
| 2017 | Call Me by Your Name | Elio Perlman | Bisexual | Timothée Chalamet | Cisgender Heterosexual | Nominated | |
| 2018 | Bohemian Rhapsody | Freddie Mercury | Bisexual | Rami Malek | Cisgender Heterosexual | Won | |
| 2019 | Pain and Glory | Salvador Mallo | Gay | Antonio Banderas | Cisgender Heterosexual | Nominated | |
| 2021 | The Power of the Dog | Phil Burbank | Queer | Benedict Cumberbatch | Cisgender Heterosexual | Nominated | |
| 2022 | The Whale | Charlie | Gay | Brendan Fraser | Cisgender Heterosexual | Won | |
| 2023 | Maestro | Leonard Bernstein | Bisexual | Bradley Cooper | Cisgender Heterosexual | Nominated | |
| 2023 | Rustin | Bayard Rustin | Gay | Colman Domingo | Cisgender; Homosexual | Nominated | |
| 2025 | Blue Moon | Lorenz Hart | Bisexual | Ethan Hawke | Cisgender; Heterosexual | Nominated | |

== Best Actress in a Leading Role ==
=== Confirmed individuals ===
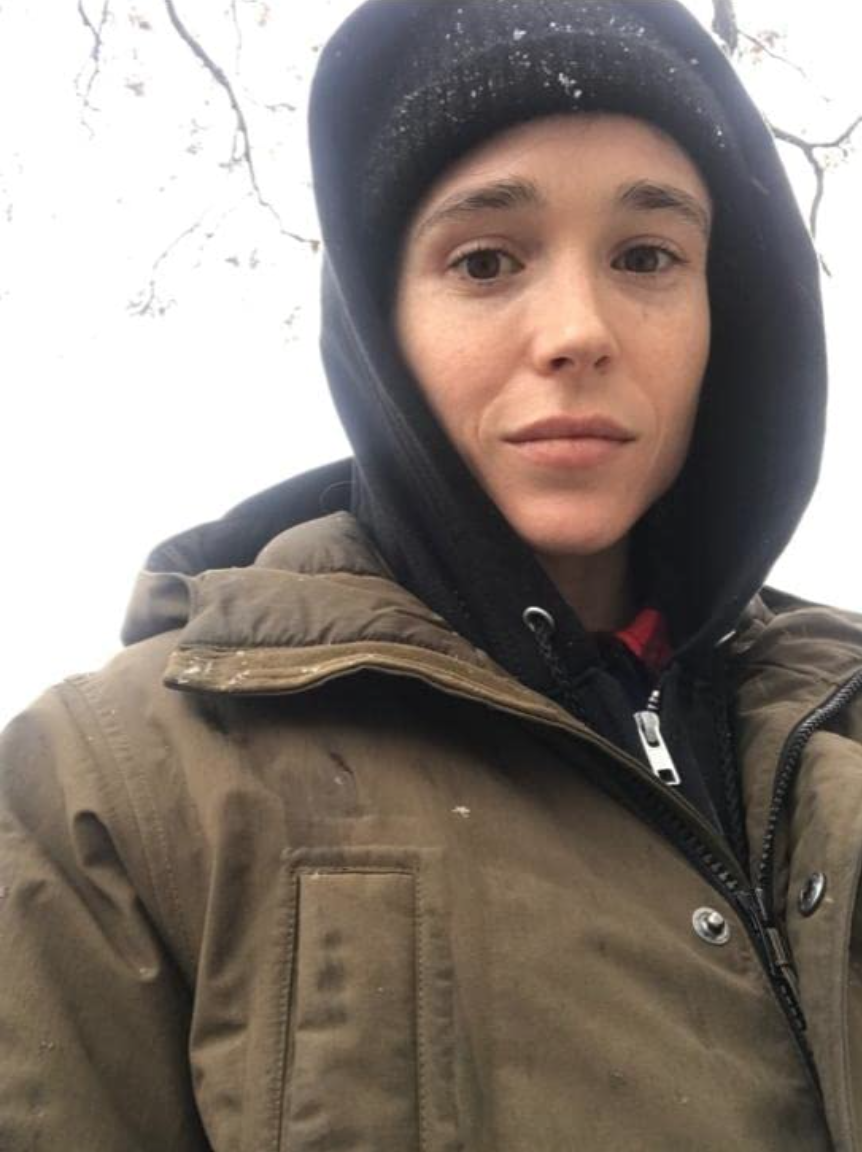
Elliot Page, trans non-binary and queer, nominated for 1 Oscar.

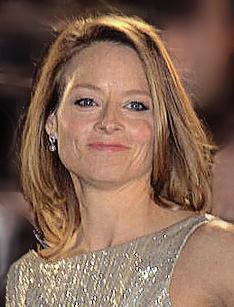
Jodie Foster, winner of 2 Oscars, nominated for 5.

Best Actress in a Leading Role
| Year | Name | Film | Role | Status | Actor's Demographic | Out at the time? | Observation | Reference |
| 1930/31 | Marlene Dietrich | Morocco | Mademoiselle Amy Jolly | Nominated | Cisgender Bisexual | No | Morocco marks the first time in cinema history that two women share a kiss on screen (Dietrich and an uncredited actress). | |
| 1981 | Susan Sarandon | Atlantic City | Sally Matthews | Nominated | Cisgender Bisexual | No | | |
| 1988 | Jodie Foster | The Accused | Sarah Tobias | Won | Cisgender Lesbian | No | Foster has acknowledged her romantic relationships with women, but has not identified as a specific sexuality. Foster is the only openly queer woman to win two acting Oscars. | |
| 1991 | Jodie Foster | The Silence of the Lambs | Clarice Starling | Won | Cisgender Lesbian | No | Foster has acknowledged her romantic relationships with women, but has not identified as a specific sexuality. Foster is the only openly queer woman to win two acting Oscars. | |
| 1991 | Susan Sarandon | Thelma & Louise | Louise Sawyer | Nominated | Cisgender Bisexual | No | | |
| 1992 | Susan Sarandon | Lorenzo's Oil | Michaela Odone | Nominated | Cisgender Bisexual | No | | |
| 1994 | Jodie Foster | Nell | Nell Kellty | Nominated | Cisgender Lesbian | No | | |
| 1994 | Susan Sarandon | The Client | Regina "Reggie" Love | Nominated | Cisgender Bisexual | No | | |
| 1995 | Susan Sarandon | Dead Man Walking | Sister Helen Prejean | Won | Cisgender Bisexual | No | | |
| 2007 | Elliot Page (as Ellen Page) | Juno | Juno MacGuff | Nominated | Transgender Non-Binary & Queer | No | Assigned female at birth, Page was nominated in the Leading Actress category before publicly coming out as transgender a decade later. | |
| 2008 | Angelina Jolie | Changeling | Christine Collins | Nominated | Cisgender Bisexual | Yes | | |
| 2018 | Olivia Colman | The Favourite | Queen Anne | Won | Non-Binary | No | | |
| 2018 | Lady Gaga | A Star Is Born | Ally Maine | Nominated | Cisgender Bisexual | Yes | | |
| 2019 | Cynthia Erivo | Harriet | Harriet Tubman | Nominated | Cisgender Bisexual | No | | |
| 2021 | Olivia Colman | The Lost Daughter | Leda Caruso | Nominated | Non-Binary | No | | |
| 2021 | Kristen Stewart | Spencer | Diana, Princess of Wales | Nominated | Cisgender Bisexual | Yes | | |
| 2023 | Lily Gladstone | Killers of the Flower Moon | Mollie Burkhart | Nominated | Non-Binary Queer | Yes | | |
| 2024 | Karla Sofía Gascón | Emilia Pérez | Emilia Pérez/Manitas | Nominated | Transgender | Yes | First openly transgender person to be nominated for an acting Oscar | |
| 2024 | Cynthia Erivo | Wicked | Elphaba Thropp | Nominated | Cisgender Bisexual | Yes | | |

=== Speculated to be LGBTQ ===
The following list is composed of actresses who have been claimed to be LGBT by others. They have been outed by a third party either while alive or after their death. However, they never publicly came out.

Academy Award for Best Actress
| Year | Name | Film | Role | Status | Alleged demographic | Reference |
| 1927/28 | Janet Gaynor | 7th Heaven | Diane | Won | Lesbian or Bisexual | |
| 1927/28 | Janet Gaynor | Street Angel | Angela | Won | Lesbian or Bisexual | |
| 1927/28 | Janet Gaynor | Sunrise: A Song of Two Humans | The Wife | Won | Lesbian or Bisexual | |
| 1929/30 | Greta Garbo | Anna Christie | Anna Christie | Nominated | Lesbian or Bisexual | |
| 1929/30 | Greta Garbo | Romance | Rita Cavallini | Nominated | Lesbian or Bisexual | |
| 1932/33 | Katharine Hepburn | Morning Glory | Eva Lovelace | Won | Lesbian or Bisexual | |
| 1935 | Katharine Hepburn | Alice Adams | Alice Adams | Nominated | Lesbian or Bisexual | |
| 1937 | Greta Garbo | Camille | Marguerite Gautier | Nominated | Lesbian or Bisexual | |
| 1937 | Janet Gaynor | A Star Is Born | Esther Blodgett / Vicki Lester | Nominated | Lesbian or Bisexual | |
| 1939 | Greta Garbo | Ninotchka | Nina Ivanovna 'Ninotchka' Yakushova | Nominated | Lesbian or Bisexual | |
| 1940 | Katharine Hepburn | The Philadelphia Story | Tracy Samantha Lord | Nominated | Lesbian or Bisexual | |
| 1942 | Katharine Hepburn | Woman of the Year | Tess Harding | Nominated | Lesbian or Bisexual | |
| 1951 | Katharine Hepburn | The African Queen | Rose Sayer | Nominated | Lesbian or Bisexual | |
| 1955 | Katharine Hepburn | Summertime | Jane Hudson | Nominated | Lesbian or Bisexual | |
| 1956 | Katharine Hepburn | The Rainmaker | Lizzie Curry | Nominated | Lesbian or Bisexual | |
| 1959 | Katharine Hepburn | Suddenly, Last Summer | Catherine Holly | Nominated | Lesbian or Bisexual | |
| 1962 | Katharine Hepburn | Long Day's Journey into Night | Mary Tyrone | Nominated | Lesbian or Bisexual | |
| 1967 | Katharine Hepburn | Guess Who's Coming to Dinner? | Christina Drayton | Won | Lesbian or Bisexual | |
| 1968 | Katharine Hepburn | The Lion in Winter | Eleanor of Aquitaine | Won | Lesbian or Bisexual | |
| 1981 | Katharine Hepburn | On Golden Pond | Ethel Thayer | Won | Lesbian or Bisexual | |

=== Performances of LGBTQ Characters Nominated for or Awarded Best Actress in a Leading Role ===
Performances of LGBTQ Characters Nominated for or Awarded Best Actress in a Leading Role
| Year | Film | Role | Character's Demographic | Actress | Actress' Demographic | Status | Refs |
| 1930/31 | Morocco | Mademoiselle Amy Jolly | Queer | Marlene Dietrich | Cisgender Bisexual | Nominated | |
| 1974 | Lenny | Honey Bruce | Bisexual | Valerie Perrine | Cisgender Heterosexual | Nominated | |
| 1979 | The Rose | Mary Rose "The Rose" Foster | Bisexual | Bette Midler | Cisgender Heterosexual | Nominated | |
| 1984 | The Bostonians | Olive Chancellor | Lesbian | Vanessa Redgrave | Cisgender Heterosexual | Nominated | |
| 1985 | The Color Purple | Celie Harris-Johnson | Lesbian | Whoopi Goldberg | Cisgender Heterosexual | Nominated | |
| 1999 | Boys Don't Cry | Brandon Teena | Transgender man | Hilary Swank | Cisgender Heterosexual | Won | |
| 2001 | Iris | Iris Murdoch | Bisexual | Judi Dench | Cisgender Heterosexual | Nominated | |
| 2002 | Frida | Frida Kahlo | Bisexual | Salma Hayek | Cisgender Heterosexual | Nominated | |
| 2002 | The Hours | Virginia Woolf | Lesbian | Nicole Kidman | Cisgender Heterosexual | Won | |
| 2003 | Monster | Aileen Wuornos | Lesbian | Charlize Theron | Cisgender Heterosexual | Won | |
| 2005 | Transamerica | Sabrina "Bree" Osbourne | Transgender woman | Felicity Huffman | Cisgender Heterosexual | Nominated | |
| 2006 | Notes on a Scandal | Barbara Covett | Lesbian | Judi Dench | Cisgender Heterosexual | Nominated | |
| 2010 | Black Swan | Nina Sayers | Bisexual | Natalie Portman | Cisgender Heterosexual | Won | |
| 2010 | The Kids Are All Right | Nicole Allgood | Lesbian | Annette Bening | Cisgender Heterosexual | Nominated | |
| 2011 | Albert Nobbs | Albert Nobbs | Transgender man | Glenn Close | Cisgender Heterosexual | Nominated | |
| 2011 | The Girl with the Dragon Tattoo | Lisbeth Salander | Bisexual | Rooney Mara | Cisgender Heterosexual | Nominated | |
| 2015 | Carol | Carol Aird | Lesbian | Cate Blanchett | Cisgender Heterosexual | Nominated | |
| 2018 | Can You Ever Forgive Me? | Lee Israel | Lesbian | Melissa McCarthy | Cisgender Heterosexual | Nominated | |
| 2018 | The Favourite | Queen Anne of Great Britain | Lesbian | Olivia Colman | Non-binary heterosexual | Won | |
| 2020/21 | Ma Rainey's Black Bottom | Ma Rainey | Bisexual | Viola Davis | Cisgender heterosexual | Nominated | |
| 2020/21 | The United States vs. Billie Holiday | Billie Holiday | Bisexual | Andra Day | Cisgender heterosexual | Nominated | |
| 2021 | Parallel Mothers | Janis Martínez Moreno | Bisexual | Penélope Cruz | Cisgender heterosexual | Nominated | |
| 2022 | Everything Everywhere All at Once | Evelyn Quan Wang | Unclear (Note: In one of the alternate universes shown in the film, Evelyn and Deirdre are shown to be in a romantic relationship. The main universe Evelyn is depicted as straight while the main universe Deirdre is not depicted as any specific sexuality.) | Michelle Yeoh | Cisgender heterosexual | Won | |
| 2022 | Tár | Lydia Tár | Lesbian | Cate Blanchett | Cisgender heterosexual | Nominated | |
| 2023 | Anatomy of a Fall | Sandra Voyter | Bisexual | Sandra Hüller | Cisgender heterosexual | Nominated | |
| 2023 | Nyad | Diana Nyad | Lesbian | Annette Bening | Cisgender heterosexual | Nominated | |
| 2023 | Poor Things | Bella Baxter | Bisexual | Emma Stone | Cisgender heterosexual | Won | |
| 2024 | Emilia Pérez | Emilia Pérez | Transgender woman | Karla Sofía Gascón | Lesbian or Bisexual Transgender | Nominated | |

== Best Actor in a Supporting Role ==
=== Confirmed individuals ===
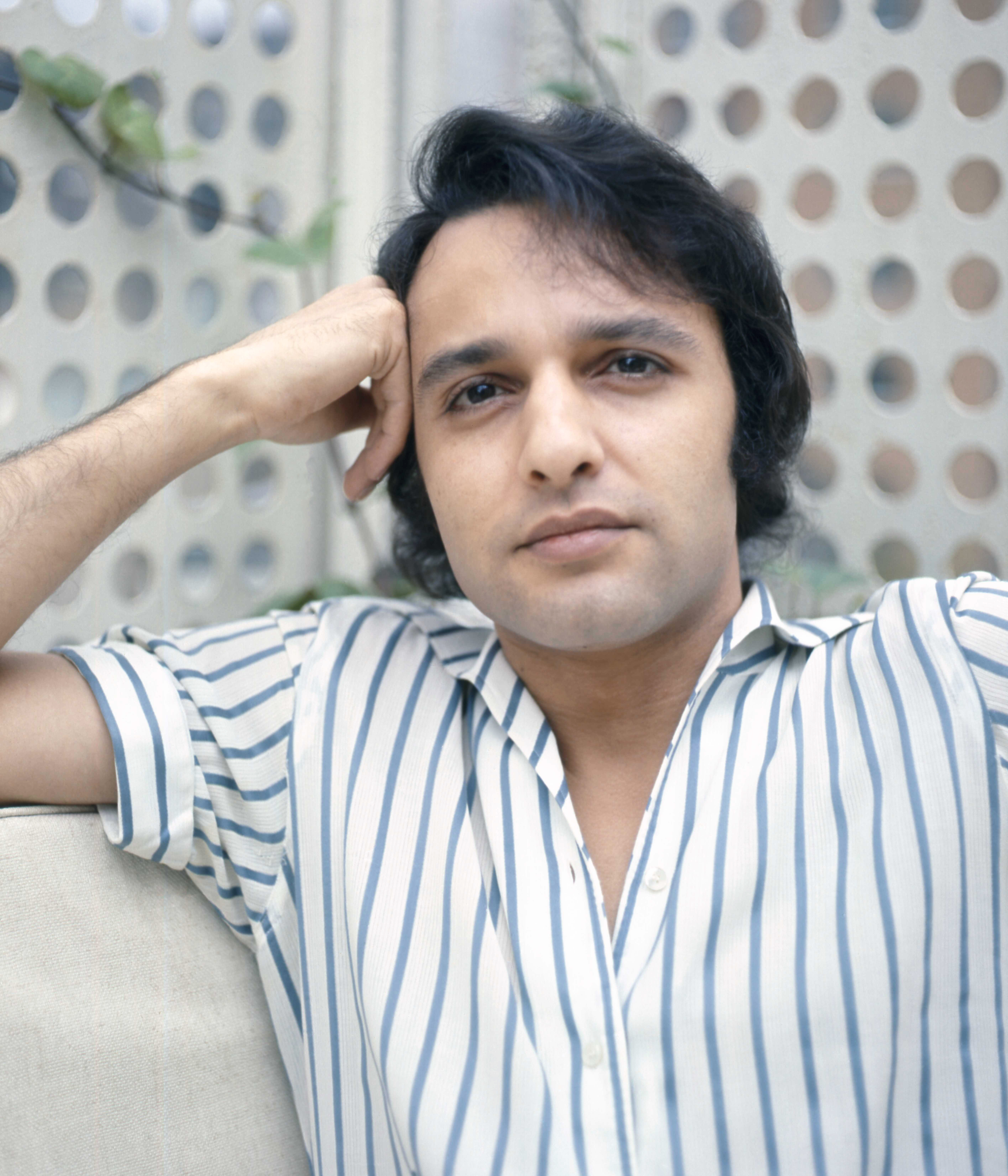
Sal Mineo, bisexual, nominated for 2 Oscars.

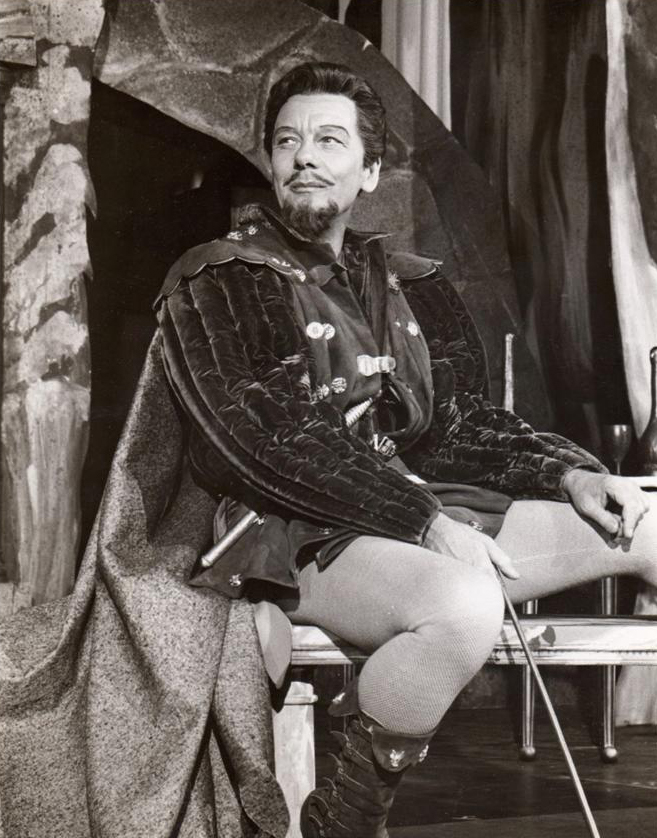
Sir John Gielgud, gay, winner of 1 Oscar, nominated for 2.

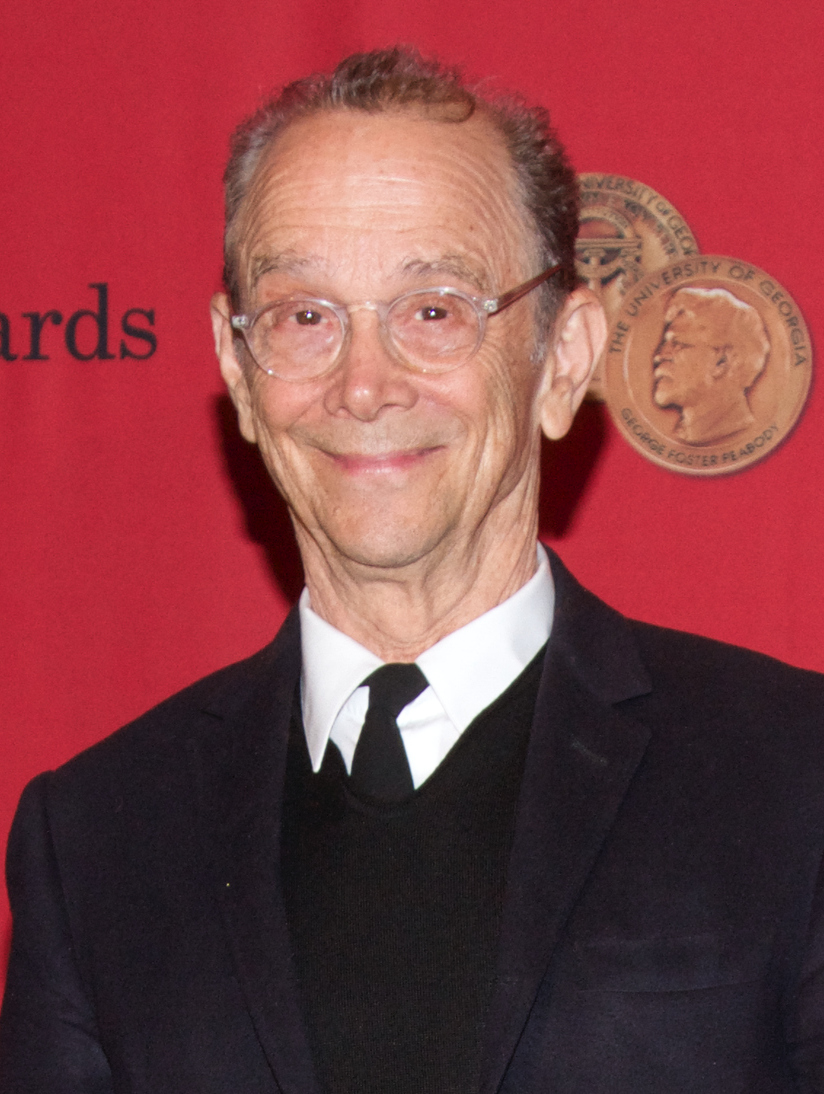
Joel Grey, gay, winner of 1 Oscar.

Best Actor in a Supporting Role
| Year | Name | Film | Role | Status | Actor's Demographic | Out at the time? | Observation | Reference |
| 1955 | Sal Mineo | Rebel Without a Cause | John 'Plato' Crawford | Nominated | Cisgender Homosexual or Bisexual | No | Mineo confirmed his bisexuality slightly over a decade after his second nomination, in a 1972 interview with Boze Hadleigh—four years prior to his murder. | |
| 1960 | Sal Mineo | Exodus | Dov Landau | Nominated | Cisgender Homosexual or Bisexual | No | Mineo confirmed his bisexuality slightly over a decade after his second nomination, in a 1972 interview with Boze Hadleigh—four years prior to his murder. | |
| 1964 | John Gielgud | Becket | King Louis VII of France | Nominated | Cisgender Homosexual | Yes (outed) | In 1953, Gielgud was arrested in Chelsea for cottaging (cruising for public sex), as homosexuality had not yet been decriminalized in the U.K. until the late 1960s. Gielgud was the first openly gay actor nominated in any category. | |
| 1971 | Leonard Frey | Fiddler on the Roof | Motel Kamzoil | Nominated | Cisgender Homosexual | Yes | | |
| 1972 | Joel Grey | Cabaret | Master of Ceremonies | Won | Cisgender Homosexual | No | Although once married (with children, including Jennifer Grey), Joel later acknowledged his orientation in 2015. | |
| 1977 | Alec Guinness | Star Wars | Obi-Wan Kenobi | Nominated | Cisgender Bisexual | No | (See note above in Best Actor section.) | |
| 1978 | Christopher Walken | The Deer Hunter | Nikonar "Nick" Chevotarevich | Won | Cisgender Bisexual | Yes | Walken was the first openly LGBTQ actor to win an Oscar. | |
| 1981 | John Gielgud | Arthur | Hobson | Won | Cisgender Homosexual | Yes (outed) | (See note above with 1964 nom.). | |
| 1988 | Alec Guinness | Little Dorrit | William Dorrit | Nominated | Cisgender Bisexual | No | (See notes above in Best Actor section.) | |
| 1989 | Marlon Brando | A Dry White Season | Ian McKenzie | Nominated | Cisgender Bisexual | Yes | (See notes above in Best Actor section.) | |
| 1992 | Jaye Davidson | The Crying Game | Dil | Nominated | Cisgender Homosexual | Yes | Felt that his "androgynous look alienated him from the gay community"; Davidson has since quit acting. | |
| 1995 | Kevin Spacey | The Usual Suspects | Roger 'Verbal' Kint | Won | Cisgender Homosexual | No | Spacey came out as a gay man in his statement addressing a sexual misconduct accusation by actor Anthony Rapp in 2017. | |
| 2001 | Ian McKellen | The Lord of the Rings: The Fellowship of the Ring | Gandalf | Nominated | Cisgender Homosexual | Yes | (See notes above in Best Actor section.) | |
| 2002 | Christopher Walken | Catch Me If You Can | Frank Abagnale Sr. | Nominated | Cisgender Bisexual | Yes | | |

=== Speculated to be LGBTQ ===
The following list is composed of actors who have been claimed to be LGBT by others. They have been outed by a third party either while alive or after their death. However, they never publicly came out.

Best Actor in a Supporting Role
| Year | Name | Film | Role | Status | Alleged Demographic | Reference |
| 1944 | Clifton Webb | Laura | Waldo Lydecker | Nominated | Gay | |
| 1944 | Monty Woolley | Since You Went Away | Colonel William G. Smollett | Nominated | Gay | |
| 1945 | John Dall | The Corn is Green | Morgan Evans | Nominated | Gay | |
| 1946 | Clifton Webb | The Razor's Edge | Elliott Templeton | Nominated | Gay | |
| 1956 | Anthony Perkins | Friendly Persuasion | Josh Birdwell | Nominated | Bisexual | |
| 1961 | Montgomery Clift | Judgment at Nuremberg | Rudolph Peterson | Nominated | Bisexual | |
| 1962 | Victor Buono | What Ever Happened to Baby Jane? | Edwin Flagg | Nominated | Gay | |
| 1981 | James Coco | Only When I Laugh | Jimmy Perrino | Nominated | Gay | |
| 1981 | Howard E. Rollins, Jr. | Ragtime | Coalhouse Walker, Jr. | Nominated | Gay | |
| 1986 | Denholm Elliott | A Room with a View | Mr. Emerson | Nominated | Bisexual | |

=== Performances of LGBTQ Characters Nominated for or Awarded Best Actor in a Supporting Role ===
Performances of LGBTQ Characters Nominated for or Awarded Best Actor in a Supporting Role
| Year | Film | Role | Character's Demographic | Actor | Actor's Demographic | Status | Refs |
| 1941 | The Maltese Falcon | Kasper 'The Fat Man' Gutman | Queer | Sydney Greenstreet | Cisgender Heterosexual | Nominated | |
| 1946 | The Razor's Edge | Elliott Templeton | Gay | Clifton Webb | Cisgender Homosexual | Nominated | |
| 1955 | Rebel Without a Cause | John 'Plato' Crawford | Gay | Sal Mineo | Cisgender Bisexual | Nominated | |
| 1962 | Lawrence of Arabia | Sherif Ali bin el Kharish | Gay | Omar Sharif | Cisgender Heterosexual | Nominated | |
| 1975 | Dog Day Afternoon | Leon Shermer | Transgender woman | Chris Sarandon | Cisgender Heterosexual | Nominated | |
| 1981 | Only When I Laugh | Jimmy Perry | Gay | James Coco | Cisgender Undetermined | Nominated | |
| 1982 | The World According to Garp | Roberta Muldoon | Transgender woman | John Lithgow | Cisgender Heterosexual | Nominated | |
| 1982 | Victor/Victoria | Carroll 'Toddy' Todd | Gay | Robert Preston | Cisgender Heterosexual | Nominated | |
| 1990 | Longtime Companion | David | Gay | Bruce Davison | Cisgender Heterosexual | Nominated | |
| 1991 | JFK | Clay Shaw | Gay | Tommy Lee Jones | Cisgender Heterosexual | Nominated | |
| 1992 | The Crying Game | Dil | Transgender woman | Jaye Davidson | Cisgender Homosexual | Nominated | |
| 1997 | As Good as It Gets | Simon Bishop | Gay | Greg Kinnear | Cisgender Heterosexual | Nominated | |
| 2002 | The Hours | Richard Brown | Gay | Ed Harris | Cisgender Heterosexual | Nominated | |
| 2005 | Brokeback Mountain | Jack Twist | Gay or Bisexual | Jake Gyllenhaal | Cisgender Heterosexual | Nominated | |
| 2011 | Beginners | Hal Fields | Gay | Christopher Plummer | Cisgender Heterosexual | Won | |
| 2013 | Dallas Buyers Club | Rayon | Transgender woman | Jared Leto | Cisgender Heterosexual | Won | |
| 2017 | The Shape of Water | Giles | Gay | Richard Jenkins | Cisgender Heterosexual | Nominated | |
| 2018 | Can You Ever Forgive Me? | Jack Hock | Gay | Richard E. Grant | Cisgender Heterosexual | Nominated | |
| 2018 | Green Book | Don Shirley | Gay | Mahershala Ali | Cisgender Heterosexual | Won | |
| 2021 | The Power of the Dog | Peter Gordon | Bi-curious | Kodi Smit-McPhee | Cisgender Heterosexual | Nominated | |
| 2023 | American Fiction | Clifford "Cliff" Ellison | Gay | Sterling K. Brown | Cisgender Heterosexual | Nominated | |
| 2024 | The Apprentice | Roy Cohn | Gay | Jeremy Strong | Cisgender Heterosexual | Nominated | |

Note: Nominated for his performance in 2024's The Brutalist, Guy Pearce's character rapes his male protagonist. However, the action transpires in an ambiguous manner, leaving the audience to interpret whether the character is in fact gay or bisexual or if the attack is a narrative scheme supposed to highlight the power dynamics between protagonist and antagonist.

== Best Actress in a Supporting Role ==
=== Confirmed individuals ===
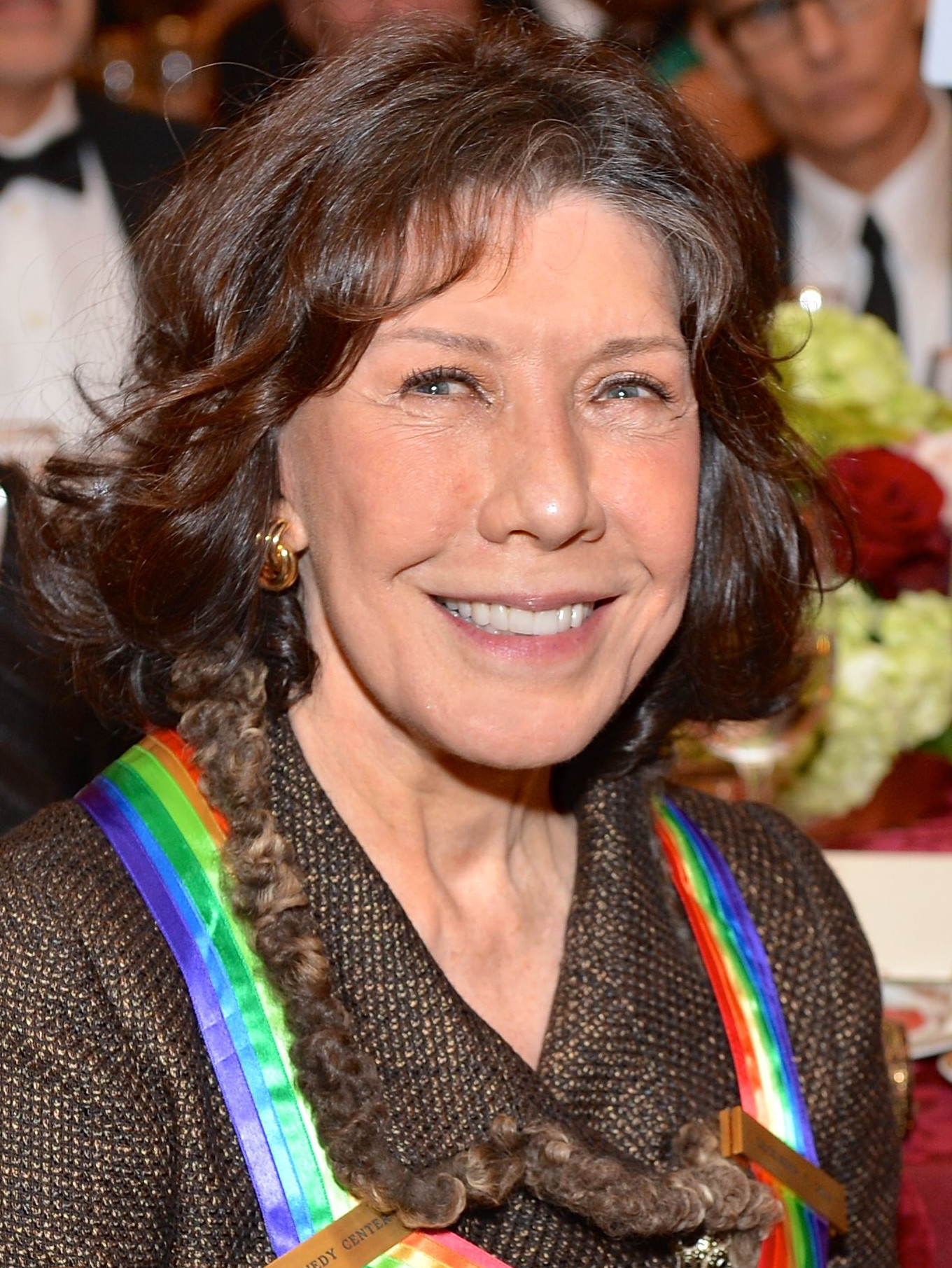
Lily Tomlin, lesbian, nominated for 1 Oscar.

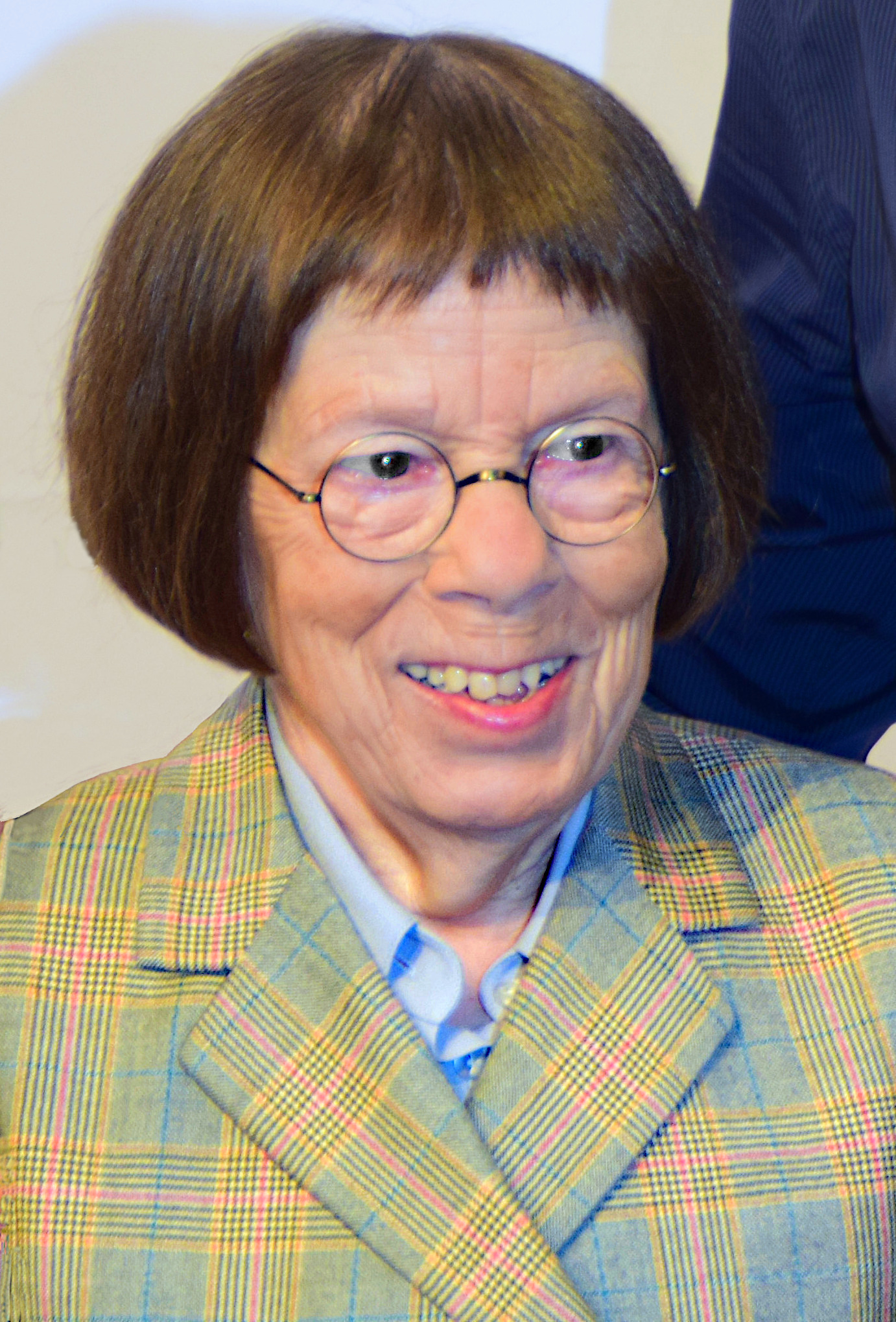
Linda Hunt, lesbian, winner of 1 Oscar.

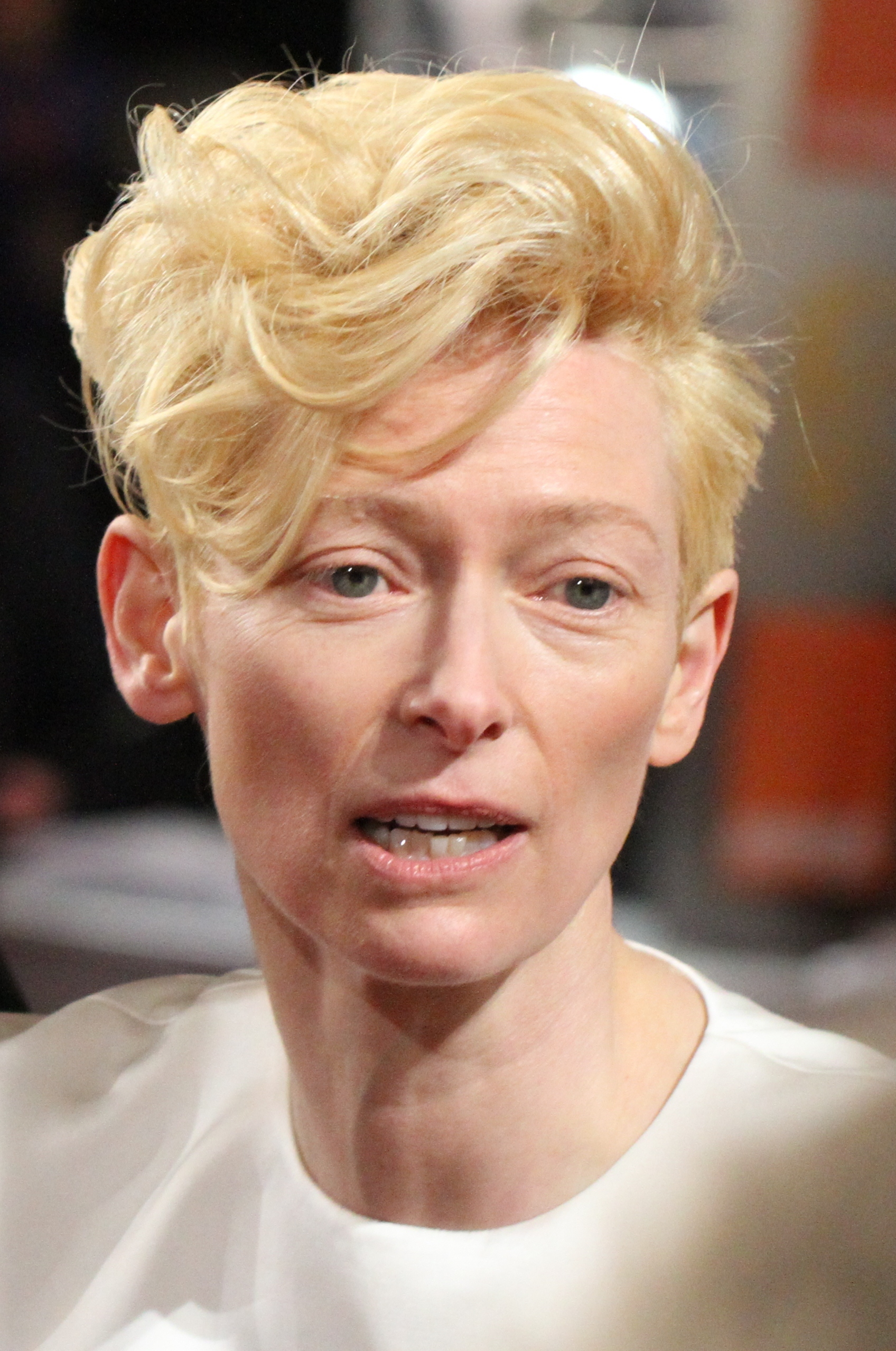
Tilda Swinton, queer, winner of 1 Oscar.

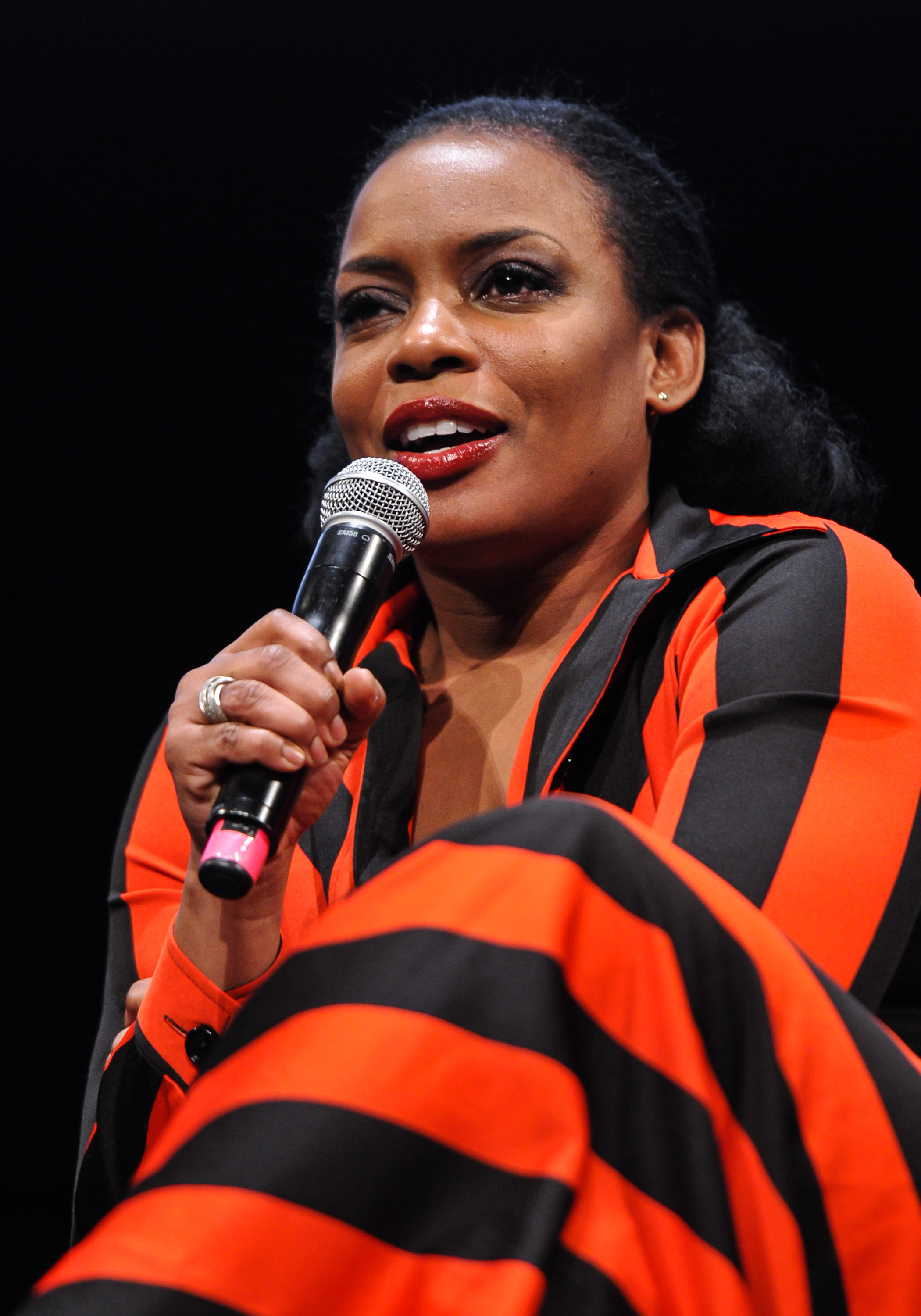
Aunjanue Ellis-Taylor, bisexual, nominated for 1 Oscar.

Academy Award for Best Supporting Actress
| Year | Name | Film | Role | Status | Actor's Demographic | Out at the time? | Observation | Reference |
| 1949 | Ethel Waters | Pinky | Dicey Johnson | Nominated | Cisgender Bisexual | No | | |
| 1973 | Tatum O'Neal | Paper Moon | Addie Loggins | Won | Cisgender Bisexual | No | | |
| 1975 | Lily Tomlin | Nashville | Linnea Reese | Nominated | Cisgender Lesbian | No | | |
| 1976 | Jodie Foster | Taxi Driver | Iris 'Easy' Steensma | Nominated | Cisgender Lesbian | No | (See note on Best Actress table.) | |
| 1980 | Eva Le Gallienne | Resurrection | Pearl | Nominated | Cisgender Lesbian | Yes | | |
| 1983 | Linda Hunt | The Year of Living Dangerously | Billy Kwan | Won | Cisgender Lesbian | Yes | Hunt portrayed a character who was a cisgender male, and was the first person to win an Oscar for playing a member of the opposite gender. | |
| 1993 | Anna Paquin | The Piano | Flora McGrath | Won | Cisgender Bisexual | No | | |
| 1999 | Angelina Jolie | Girl, Interrupted | Lisa Rowe | Won | Cisgender Bisexual | Yes | | |
| 2002 | Queen Latifah | Chicago | Matron 'Mama' Morton | Nominated | Cisgender Unspecified | No | Latifah hasn't identified her sexual orientation, but during her speech at the BET Awards 2021, she referenced Eboni Nichols as her partner. | |
| 2007 | Tilda Swinton | Michael Clayton | Karen Crowder | Won | Cisgender Queer | No | | |
| 2009 | Mo'Nique | Precious | Mary Lee Johnston | Won | Cisgender Queer | No | | |
| 2020 | Olivia Colman | The Father | Anne | Nominated | Non-Binary | No | | |
| 2021 | Ariana DeBose | West Side Story | Anita | Won | Cisgender Queer | Yes | DeBose is the first openly queer actor of color to win an Oscar, in any category. | |
| 2021 | Aunjanue Ellis | King Richard | Oracene Price | Nominated | Cisgender Bisexual | No | | |
| 2022 | Stephanie Hsu | Everything Everywhere All at Once | Joy Wang / Jobu Tupaki | Nominated | Cisgender Queer | Yes | | |
| 2023 | Jodie Foster | Nyad | Bonnie Stoll | Nominated | Cisgender Lesbian | Yes | (See note on Best Actress table.) | |
| 2024 | Zoe Saldaña | Emilia Perez | Rita Mora Castro | Won | Cisgender Sexually Fluid | No | Without restricting herself to any labels, Saldaña has publicly stated that she is sexually fluid and has had relationships with people of the same sex. | |

=== Speculated to be LGBTQ ===
The following list is composed of actresses who have been claimed to be LGBT by others. They have been outed by a third party either while alive or after their death. However, they never publicly came out.

Academy Award for Best Supporting Actress
| Year | Name | Film | Role | Status | Alleged demographic | Reference |
| 1938 | Spring Byington | You Can't Take It with You | Penelope 'Penny' Sycamore | Nominated | Lesbian and bisexual | |
| 1947 | Marjorie Main | The Egg and I | Phoebe 'Ma' Kettle | Nominated | Lesbian and bisexual | |
| 1966 | Sandy Dennis | Who's Afraid of Virginia Woolf? | Honey | Won | Bisexual | |

=== Performances of LGBTQ Characters Nominated for or Awarded Best Actress in a Supporting Role ===
Performances of LGBTQ Characters Nominated for or Awarded Best Actress in a Supporting Role
| Year | Film | Role | Character's demographic | Actress | Actress's demographic | Status | References |
| 1940 | Rebecca | Mrs. Danvers | Lesbian | Judith Anderson | Cisgender Heterosexual | Nominated | |
| 1950 | Caged | Evelyn Harper | Lesbian | Hope Emerson | Cisgender Heterosexual | Nominated | |
| 1964 | The Night of the Iguana | Judith Fellowes | Lesbian | Grayson Hall | Cisgender Heterosexual | Nominated | |
| 1968 | Rachel, Rachel | Calla Mackie | Lesbian | Estelle Parsons | Cisgender Heterosexual | Nominated | |
| 1983 | Silkwood | Dolly Pelliker | Lesbian | Cher | Cisgender Heterosexual | Nominated | |
| 1985 | The Color Purple | Shug Avery | Bisexual | Margaret Avery | Cisgender Heterosexual | Nominated | |
| 1998 | Primary Colors | Libby Holden | Lesbian | Kathy Bates | Cisgender Heterosexual | Nominated | |
| 1999 | Being John Malkovich | Maxine Lund | Bisexual | Catherine Keener | Cisgender Heterosexual | Nominated | |
| 1999 | Girl, Interrupted | Lisa Rowe | Bisexual | Angelina Jolie | Cisgender Bisexual | Won | |
| 2001 | Iris | Iris Murdoch | Bisexual | Kate Winslet | Cisgender Heterosexual | Nominated | |
| 2008 | Vicky Cristina Barcelona | María Elena | Bisexual | Penélope Cruz | Cisgender Heterosexual | Won | |
| 2011 | Albert Nobbs | Hubert Page | Transgender man | Janet McTeer | Cisgender Heterosexual | Nominated | |
| 2015 | Carol | Therese Belivet | Lesbian | Rooney Mara | Cisgender Heterosexual | Nominated | |
| 2018 | The Favourite | Baroness Abigail Masham | Lesbian or Bisexual | Emma Stone | Cisgender Heterosexual | Nominated | |
| 2018 | The Favourite | Sarah Churchill, Duchess of Marlborough | Lesbian or Bisexual | Rachel Weisz | Cisgender Heterosexual | Nominated | |
| 2019 | Bombshell | Kayla Pospisil | Lesbian or Bisexual | Margot Robbie | Cisgender Heterosexual | Nominated | |
| 2022 | Everything Everywhere All at Once | Deirdre Beaubeirdre | Unclear | Jamie Lee Curtis | Cisgender Heterosexual | Won | |
| 2022 | Everything Everywhere All at Once | Joy Wang / Jobu Tupaki | Lesbian | Stephanie Hsu | Cisgender Queer | Nominated | |
| 2023 | Nyad | Bonnie Stoll | Lesbian | Jodie Foster | Cisgender; Unspecified LGBT | Nominated | |

== Best Animated Feature ==
Academy Award for Best Animated Feature
| Year | Name | Film | Status | Nominee's Demographic | Reference |
| 2008 | Byron Howard | Bolt | Nominated | Cisgender Homosexual | |
| 2010 | Dean DeBlois | How to Train Your Dragon | Nominated | Cisgender Homosexual | |
| 2010 | Lee Unkrich | Toy Story 3 | Won | Cisgender Bisexual | |
| 2012 | Chris Butler | ParaNorman | Nominated | Cisgender Homosexual | |
| 2014 | Dean DeBlois | How to Train Your Dragon 2 | Nominated | Cisgender Homosexual | |
| 2016 | Byron Howard | Zootopia | Won | Cisgender Homosexual | |
| 2017 | Darla K. Anderson | Coco | Won | Cisgender Lesbian | |
| 2017 | Lee Unkrich | Coco | Won | Cisgender Bisexual | |
| 2018 | Scott Rudin | Isle of Dogs | Nominated | Cisgender Homosexual | |
| 2019 | Chris Butler | Missing Link | Nominated | Cisgender Homosexual | |
| 2019 | Dean DeBlois | How to Train Your Dragon: The Hidden World | Nominated | Cisgender Homosexual | |
| 2020 | Kori Rae | Onward | Nominated | Cisgender Lesbian | |
| 2021 | Byron Howard | Encanto | Won | Cisgender Homosexual | |
| 2024 | Adam Elliot | Memoir of a Snail | Nominated | Cisgender Homosexual | |
| 2024 | Jeff Hermann | The Wild Robot | Nominated | Cisgender Homosexual | |
| 2025 | Byron Howard | Zootopia 2 | Nominated | Cisgender Homosexual | |
| 2025 | Adrian Molina | Elio | Nominated | Cisgender Homosexual | |

=== Best Animated Feature winners and nominees with LGBTQ themes ===
| Year | Title | Status | Relevant Theme | Reference |
|---|---|---|---|---|
| 2007 | Persepolis | Nominated | Gay | |
| 2012 | ParaNorman | Nominated | Gay | |
| 2017 | The Breadwinner | Nominated | Non-binary | |
| 2021 | Flee | Nominated | Gay | |
| 2021 | The Mitchells vs. the Machines | Nominated | Queer | |
| 2023 | Nimona | Nominated | Gay | |
| 2024 | Memoir of a Snail | Nominated | Gay | |

== Best Cinematography ==
Academy Award for Best Cinematography
| Year | Name | Film | Status | Milestone | Demographic | Reference |
| 1978 | Néstor Almendros | Days of Heaven | Won | | Cisgender Homosexual | |
| 1979 | Néstor Almendros | Kramer vs. Kramer | Nominated | | Cisgender Homosexual | |
| 1980 | Néstor Almendros | The Blue Lagoon | Nominated | | Cisgender Homosexual | |
| 1980 | James Crabe | The Formula | Nominated | | Cisgender Homosexual | |
| 1982 | Néstor Almendros | Sophie's Choice | Nominated | | Cisgender Homosexual | |
| 1985 | David Watkin | Out of Africa | Won | | Cisgender Homosexual | |
| 2017 | Rachel Morrison | Mudbound | Nominated | First female nominee for Best Cinematography | Cisgender Lesbian | |

== Best Costume Design ==
Academy Award for Best Costume Design
| Year | Name | Film | Status | Reference |
| 1950 | Walter Plunkett | The Magnificent Yankee | Nominated | |
| 1950 | Walter Plunkett | That Forsyte Woman | Nominated | |
| 1951 | Orry-Kelly | An American in Paris | Won | |
| 1951 | Walter Plunkett | An American in Paris | Won | |
| 1951 | Walter Plunkett | Kind Lady | Nominated | |
| 1951 | Irene Sharaff | An American in Paris | Won | |
| 1951 | Edward Stevenson | David and Bathsheba | Nominated | |
| 1951 | Edward Stevenson | The Mudlark | Nominated | |
| 1952 | Miles White | The Greatest Show on Earth | Nominated | |
| 1953 | Walter Plunkett | The Actress | Nominated | |
| 1953 | Walter Plunkett | Young Bess | Nominated | |
| 1953 | Irene Sharaff | Call Me Madam | Nominated | |
| 1954 | Irene Sharaff | Brigadoon | Nominated | |
| 1954 | Irene Sharaff | A Star Is Born | Nominated | |
| 1954 | Miles White | There's No Business Like Show Business | Nominated | |
| 1955 | Irene Sharaff | Guys and Dolls | Nominated | |
| 1956 | Irene Sharaff | The King and I | Won | |
| 1956 | Miles White | Around the World in 80 Days | Nominated | |
| 1957 | Orry-Kelly | Les Girls | Won | |
| 1957 | Walter Plunkett | Raintree County | Nominated | |
| 1958 | Cecil Beaton | Gigi | Won | |
| 1958 | Walter Plunkett | Some Came Running | Nominated | |
| 1959 | Orry-Kelly | Some Like It Hot | Won | |
| 1959 | Irene Sharaff | Porgy and Bess | Nominated | |
| 1959 | Howard Shoup | The Young Philadelphians | Nominated | |
| 1960 | Irene Sharaff | Can-Can | Nominated | |
| 1960 | Howard Shoup | The Rise and Fall of Legs Diamond | Nominated | |
| 1960 | Edward Stevenson | The Facts of Life | Won | |
| 1961 | Piero Gherardi | La Dolce Vita | Won | |
| 1961 | Walter Plunkett | Pocketful of Miracles | Nominated | |
| 1961 | Irene Sharaff | West Side Story | Won | |
| 1961 | Howard Shoup | Claudelle Inglish | Nominated | |
| 1962 | Orry-Kelly | Gypsy | Nominated | |
| 1963 | Piero Gherardi | 8½ | Won | |
| 1963 | Walter Plunkett | How the West Was Won | Nominated | |
| 1963 | Irene Sharaff | Cleopatra | Won | |
| 1963 | Piero Tosi | The Leopard | Nominated | |
| 1964 | Cecil Beaton | My Fair Lady | Won | |
| 1964 | Howard Shoup | Kisses for My President | Nominated | |
| 1965 | Howard Shoup | A Rage to Live | Nominated | |
| 1966 | Danilo Donati | The Gospel According to St. Matthew | Nominated | |
| 1966 | Danilo Donati | Mandragola | Nominated | |
| 1966 | Piero Gherardi | Juliet of the Spirits | Nominated | |
| 1966 | Irene Sharaff | Who's Afraid of Virginia Woolf? | Won | |
| 1967 | Danilo Donati | The Taming of the Shrew | Nominated | |
| 1967 | Irene Sharaff | The Taming of the Shrew | Nominated | |
| 1968 | Danilo Donati | Romeo and Juliet | Won | |
| 1969 | Irene Sharaff | Hello, Dolly! | Nominated | |
| 1971 | Piero Tosi | Death in Venice | Nominated | |
| 1972 | Ray Aghayan | Lady Sings the Blues | Nominated | |
| 1972 | Bob Mackie | Lady Sings the Blues | Nominated | |
| 1973 | Piero Tosi | Ludwig | Nominated | |
| 1975 | Ray Aghayan | Funny Lady | Nominated | |
| 1975 | Bob Mackie | Funny Lady | Nominated | |
| 1976 | Danilo Donati | Fellini's Casanova | Won | |
| 1976 | William Ware Theiss | Bound for Glory | Nominated | |
| 1977 | Florence Klotz | A Little Night Music | Nominated | |
| 1977 | Burton Miller | Airport '77 | Nominated | |
| 1977 | Irene Sharaff | The Other Side of Midnight | Nominated | |
| 1979 | William Ware Theiss | Butch and Sundance: The Early Days | Nominated | |
| 1979 | Piero Tosi | La Cage aux Folles | Nominated | |
| 1979 | Albert Wolsky | All That Jazz | Won | |
| 1981 | Bob Mackie | Pennies from Heaven | Nominated | |
| 1982 | Piero Tosi | La Traviata | Nominated | |
| 1982 | Albert Wolsky | Sophie's Choice | Nominated | |
| 1983 | William Ware Theiss | Heart Like a Wheel | Nominated | |
| 1985 | Albert Wolsky | The Journey of Natty Gann | Nominated | |
| 1991 | Richard Hornung | Barton Fink | Nominated | |
| 1991 | Albert Wolsky | Bugsy | Won | |
| 1992 | Albert Wolsky | Toys | Nominated | |
| 1999 | Gary Jones | The Talented Mr. Ripley | Nominated | |
| 2001 | Angus Strathie | Moulin Rouge! | Won | |
| 2006 | Patricia Field | The Devil Wears Prada | Nominated | |
| 2007 | Albert Wolsky | Across the Universe | Nominated | |
| 2008 | Danny Glicker | Milk | Nominated | |
| 2008 | Albert Wolsky | Revolutionary Road | Nominated | |
| 2012 | Paco Delgado | Les Misérables | Nominated | |
| 2015 | Paco Delgado | The Danish Girl | Nominated | |
| 2021 | Paul Tazewell | West Side Story | Nominated | |
| 2024 | Paul Tazewell | Wicked | Won | |

== Best Director ==
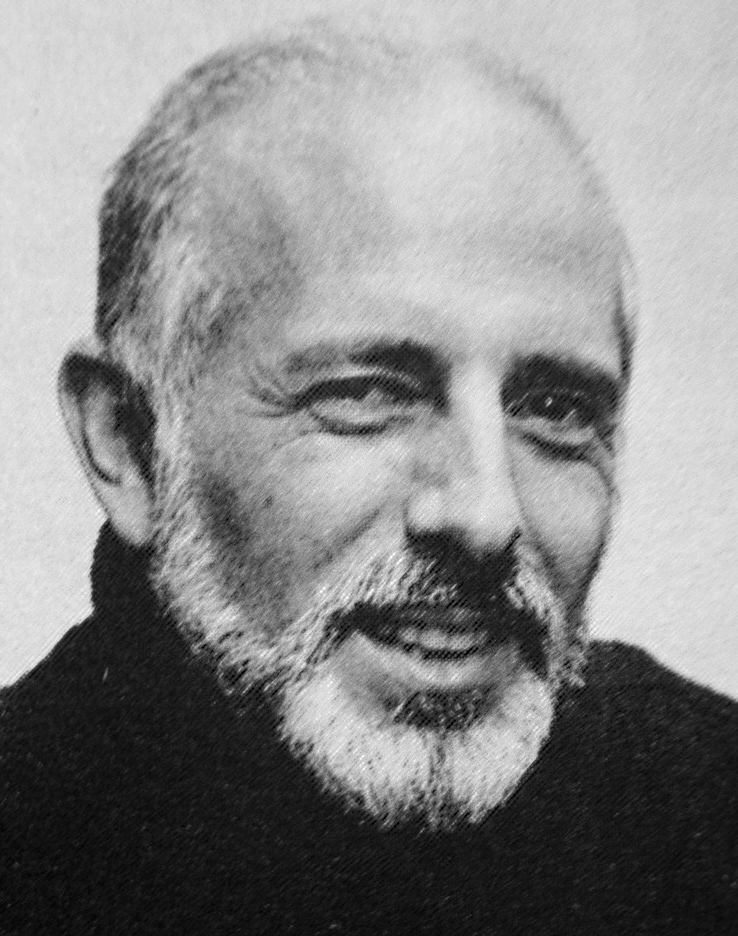
Jerome Robbins, first openly LGBT winner for Best Director.

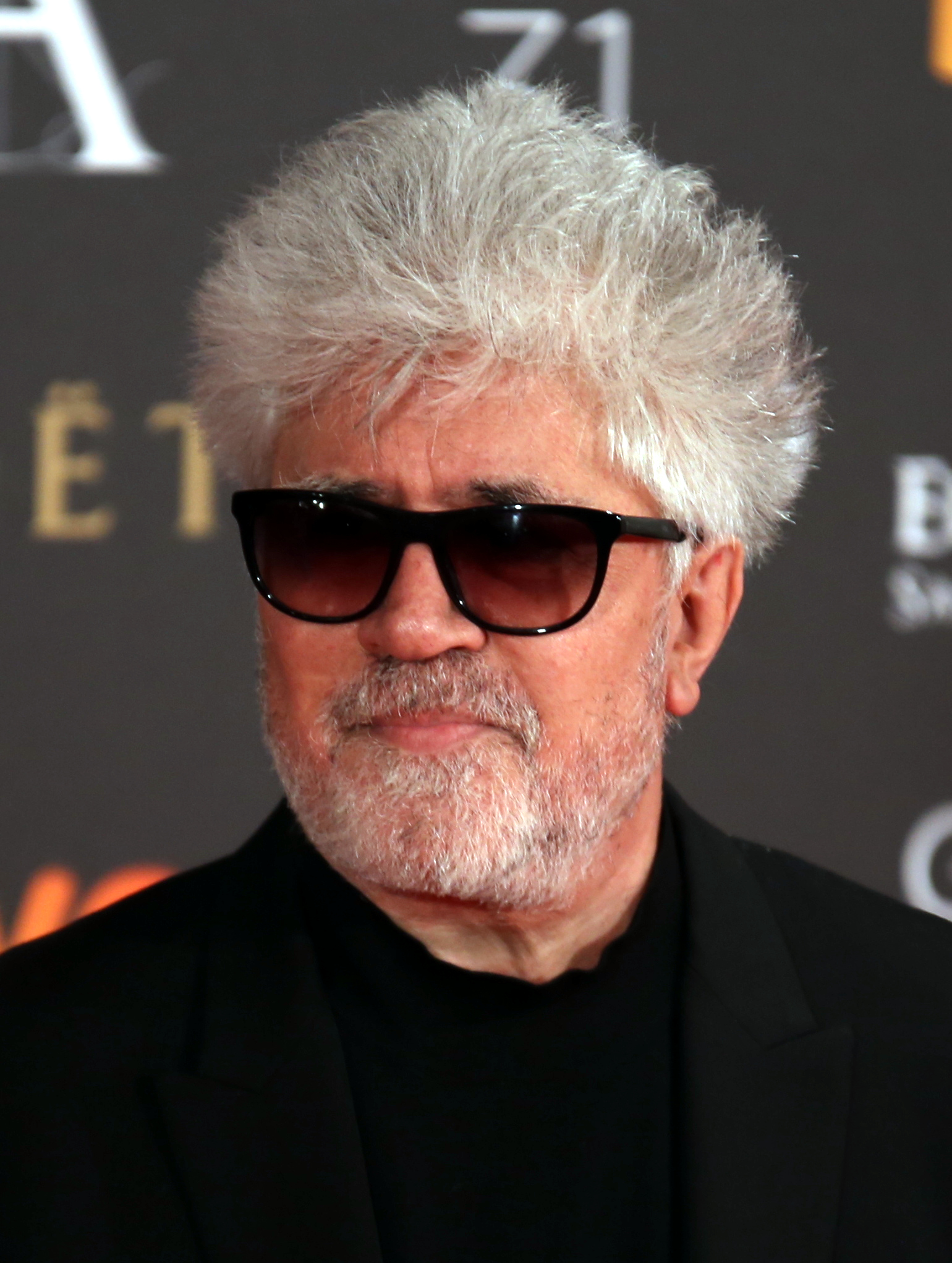
Pedro Almodóvar, gay, winner of 2 Oscars, nominated for 5.

Academy Award for Best Director
| Year | Name | Film | Status | Director's Demographic | Observation | Reference |
| 1932/33 | George Cukor | Little Women | Nominated | Cisgender Homosexual | | |
| 1940 | George Cukor | The Philadelphia Story | Nominated | Cisgender Homosexual | | |
| 1947 | George Cukor | A Double Life | Nominated | Cisgender Homosexual | | |
| 1950 | George Cukor | Born Yesterday | Nominated | Cisgender Homosexual | | |
| 1951 | Vincente Minnelli | An American in Paris | Nominated | Cisgender Homosexual or Bisexual | | |
| 1953 | Charles Walters | Lili | Nominated | Cisgender Homosexual | | |
| 1958 | Vincente Minnelli | Gigi | Won | Cisgender Homosexual or Bisexual | | |
| 1961 | Jerome Robbins | West Side Story | Won | Cisgender Bisexual | | |
| 1963 | Tony Richardson | Tom Jones | Won | Cisgender Bisexual | | |
| 1964 | George Cukor | My Fair Lady | Won | Cisgender Homosexual | | |
| 1964 | Peter Glenville | Becket | Nominated | Cisgender Homosexual | | |
| 1965 | John Schlesinger | Darling | Nominated | Cisgender Homosexual | | |
| 1968 | Franco Zeffirelli | Romeo and Juliet | Nominated | Cisgender Homosexual | | |
| 1969 | John Schlesinger | Midnight Cowboy | Won | Cisgender Homosexual | | |
| 1971 | John Schlesinger | Sunday Bloody Sunday | Nominated | Cisgender Homosexual | | |
| 1986 | James Ivory | A Room with a View | Nominated | Cisgender Homosexual | | |
| 1992 | James Ivory | Howards End | Nominated | Cisgender Homosexual | | |
| 1993 | James Ivory | The Remains of the Day | Nominated | Cisgender Homosexual | | |
| 1997 | Gus Van Sant | Good Will Hunting | Nominated | Cisgender Homosexual | | |
| 2000 | Stephen Daldry | Billy Elliot | Nominated | Cisgender Homosexual | | |
| 2002 | Pedro Almodóvar | Talk to Her | Nominated | Cisgender Homosexual | 2002 marked the first time ever that 3 out the 5 directors nominated for Best Director were gay. | |
| 2002 | Stephen Daldry | The Hours | Nominated | Cisgender Homosexual | 2002 marked the first time ever that 3 out the 5 directors nominated for Best Director were gay. | |
| 2002 | Rob Marshall | Chicago | Nominated | Cisgender Homosexual | 2002 marked the first time ever that 3 out the 5 directors nominated for Best Director were gay. | |
| 2008 | Stephen Daldry | The Reader | Nominated | Cisgender Homosexual | | |
| 2008 | Gus Van Sant | Milk | Nominated | Cisgender Homosexual | | |
| 2009 | Lee Daniels | Precious | Nominated | Cisgender Homosexual | First Black gay man nominee for Best Director | |

=== Speculated to be LGBTQ ===
The following list is composed of directors who have been claimed to be LGBT by others. They have been outed by a third party either while alive or after their death. However, they never publicly came out.

Academy Award for Best Director
| Year | Name | Film | Status | Alleged demographic | Reference |
| 1935 | John Ford | The Informer | Won | Gay or Bisexual | |
| 1939 | John Ford | Stagecoach | Nominated | Gay or Bisexual | |
| 1940 | John Ford | The Grapes of Wrath | Won | Gay or Bisexual | |
| 1941 | John Ford | How Green Was My Valley | Won | Gay or Bisexual | |
| 1952 | John Ford | The Quiet Man | Won | Gay or Bisexual | |
| 1978 | Michael Cimino | The Deer Hunter | Won | Transgender or Non-binary | |

== Best International Feature Film ==
=== Best International Feature Film winners and nominees with LGBTQ themes ===
Academy Award for Best International Feature Film
| Year | Director | Film | Status | Demographic | Country | Ref. |
| 1972 | Jaime de Armiñán | My Dearest Senorita | Nominated | Intersex | Spain | |
| 1977 | Ettore Scola | A Special Day | Nominated | Gay | Italy | |
| 1979 | Franco Brusati | To Forget Venice | Nominated | Gay & Lesbian | Italy | |
| 1985 | István Szabó | Colonel Redl | Nominated | Gay | Hungary | |
| 1993 | Chen Kaige | Farewell My Concubine | Nominated | Gay | Hong Kong | |
| 1993 | Ang Lee | The Wedding Banquet | Nominated | Gay | Taiwan | |
| 1994 | Tomás Gutiérrez Alea and Juan Carlos Tabío | Strawberry and Chocolate | Nominated | Gay | Cuba | |
| 1995 | Marleen Gorris | Antonia's Line | Won | Lesbian | Netherlands | |
| 1999 | Pedro Almodovar | All About My Mother | Won | Transgender | Spain | |
| 2002 | Paula van der Oest | Zus & Zo | Nominated | Gay | Netherlands | |
| 2017 | Sebastián Lelio | A Fantastic Woman | Won | Transgender | Chile | |
| 2019 | Pedro Almodovar | Pain and Glory | Nominated | Gay | Spain | |
| 2021 | Jonas Poher Rasmussen | Flee | Nominated | Gay | Denmark | |
| 2022 | Lukas Dhont | Close | Nominated | Gay | Belgium | |
| 2024 | Jacques Audiard | Emilia Pérez | Nominated | Transgender | France | |

== Best Documentary Feature ==
Academy Award for Best Documentary Feature
| Year | Name | Film | Status | Milestone | Reference |
| 1955 | Nancy Hamilton | Helen Keller in Her Story | Won | | |
| 1984 | Rob Epstein | The Times of Harvey Milk | Won | First gay-themed film by openly gay filmmakers to win an Academy Award | |
| 1984 | Richard Schmiechen | The Times of Harvey Milk | Won | First gay-themed film by openly gay filmmakers to win an Academy Award | |
| 1988 | Bruce Weber | Let's Get Lost | Nominated | | |
| 1989 | Rob Epstein | Common Threads: Stories from the Quilt | Won | | |
| 1992 | David Haugland | Changing Our Minds: The Story of Dr. Evelyn Hooker | Nominated | | |
| 2000 | Frances Reid | Long Night's Journey into Day | Nominated | | |
| 2006 | Laura Poitras | My Country, My Country | Nominated | | |
| 2012 | David France | How to Survive a Plague | Nominated | | |
| 2012 | Howard Gertler | How to Survive a Plague | Nominated | | |
| 2014 | Laura Poitras | Citizenfour | Won | | |
| 2014 | Joshua Oppenheimer | The Act of Killing | Nominated | | |
| 2016 | Joshua Oppenheimer | The Look of Silence | Nominated | | |
| 2017 | Yance Ford | Strong Island | Nominated | First openly transgender man to be nominated for an Academy Award | |
| 2022 | Nan Goldin | All the Beauty and the Bloodshed | Nominated | | |
| 2022 | Laura Poitras | All the Beauty and the Bloodshed | Nominated | | |
| 2025 | Tig Notaro | Come See Me in the Good Light | Nominated | | |
| 2025 | Pavel Talankin | Mr. Nobody Against Putin | Won | | |
| 2025 | Ryan White | Come See Me in the Good Light | Nominated | | |

== Best Documentary Short Subject ==
Academy Award for Best Documentary Short Subject
| Year | Name | Film | Status | Reference |
| 1952 | Norman McLaren | Neighbours | Won | |
| 1991 | Debra Chasnoff | Deadly Deception: General Electric, Nuclear Weapons and Our Environment | Won | |
| 1994 | Dee Mosbacher | Straight from the Heart | Nominated | |
| 1994 | Frances Reid | Straight from the Heart | Nominated | |
| 2002 | Robert Houston | Mighty Times: The Legacy of Rosa Parks | Nominated | |
| 2004 | Robert Houston | Mighty Times: The Children's March | Won | |
| 2018 | Rob Epstein | End Game | Nominated | |
| 2018 | Jeffrey Friedman | End Game | Nominated | |

== Best Film Editing ==
Academy Award for Best Film Editing
| Year | Name | Film | Status | Demographic | Reference |
| 1961 | William H. Reynolds | Fanny | Nominated | Cisgender Homosexual | |
| 1965 | William H. Reynolds | The Sound of Music | Won | Cisgender Homosexual | |
| 1966 | William H. Reynolds | The Sand Pebbles | Nominated | Cisgender Homosexual | |
| 1969 | William H. Reynolds | Hello, Dolly! | Nominated | Cisgender Homosexual | |
| 1972 | William H. Reynolds | The Godfather | Nominated | Cisgender Homosexual | |
| 1973 | William H. Reynolds | The Sting | Won | Cisgender Homosexual | |
| 1977 | William H. Reynolds | The Turning Point | Nominated | Cisgender Homosexual | |
| 2008 | Elliot Graham | Milk | Nominated | Cisgender Homosexual | |
| 2017 | Tatiana S. Riegel | I, Tonya | Nominated | Cisgender Lesbian | |
| 2018 | John Ottman | Bohemian Rhapsody | Won | Cisgender Homosexual | |
| 2025 | Andy Jurgensen | One Battle After Another | Won | Cisgender Homosexual | |

== Best Makeup & Hairstyling ==
Academy Award for Best Makeup and Hairstyling
| Year | Name | Film | Status | Demographic | Reference |
| 1992 | Matthew W. Mungle | Bram Stoker's Dracula | Won | Gay | |
| 1993 | Matthew W. Mungle | Schindler's List | Nominated | Gay | |
| 1996 | Matthew W. Mungle | Ghosts of Mississippi | Nominated | Gay | |
| 2002 | John E. Jackson | Frida | Won | Gay | |
| 2005 | Tami Lane | The Chronicles of Narnia: The Lion, the Witch and the Wardrobe | Won | Lesbian | |
| 2011 | J. Roy Helland | The Iron Lady | Won | Gay | |
| 2011 | Matthew W. Mungle | Albert Nobbs | Nominated | Gay | |
| 2012 | Tami Lane | The Hobbit: An Unexpected Journey | Nominated | Lesbian | |
| 2020 | Matthew W. Mungle | Hillbilly Elegy | Nominated | Gay | |
| 2020 | Sergio López-Rivera | Ma Rainey's Black Bottom | Won | Gay | |
| 2021 | Frederic Aspiras | House of Gucci | Nominated | Gay | |

== Best Music, Original Score ==
Academy Award for Best Original Score
| Year | Name | Film | Status | Reference |
| 1939 | Aaron Copland | Of Mice and Men | Nominated | |
| 1940 | Aaron Copland | Our Town | Nominated | |
| 1943 | Aaron Copland | The North Star | Nominated | |
| 1949 | Aaron Copland | The Heiress | Won | |
| 1954 | Leonard Bernstein | On the Waterfront | Nominated | |
| 1965 | Jacques Demy | The Umbrellas of Cherbourg | Nominated | |
| 1967 | Richard Rodney Bennett | Far from the Madding Crowd | Nominated | |
| 1971 | Richard Rodney Bennett | Nicholas and Alexandra | Nominated | |
| 1974 | Richard Rodney Bennett | Murder on the Orient Express | Nominated | |
| 1980 | John Corigliano | Altered States | Nominated | |
| 1992 | Richard Robbins | Howards End | Nominated | |
| 1993 | Richard Robbins | The Remains of the Day | Nominated | |
| 1995 | Marc Shaiman | The American President | Nominated | |
| 1996 | Marc Shaiman | The First Wives Club | Nominated | |
| 1998 | Marc Shaiman | Patch Adams | Nominated | |
| 1999 | John Corigliano | The Red Violin | Won | |
| 2013 | Owen Pallett | Her | Nominated | |
| 2016 | Mica Levi | Jackie | Nominated | |
| 2018 | Marc Shaiman | Mary Poppins Returns | Nominated | |
| 2023 | Laura Karpman | American Fiction | Nominated | |

== Best Music, Original Song Score or Adaptation ==
Original Song Score or Adaptation
| Year | Name | Film | Status | Milestone | Reference |
| 1939 | Aaron Copland | Of Mice and Men | Nominated | | |
| 1939 | Roger Edens | Babes in Arms | Nominated | | |
| 1940 | Aaron Copland | Our Town | Nominated | | |
| 1940 | Roger Edens | Strike Up the Band | Nominated | | |
| 1942 | Roger Edens | For Me and My Gal | Nominated | | |
| 1948 | Roger Edens | Easter Parade | Won | Only composer to win three consecutive awards in this category. | |
| 1949 | Roger Edens | On the Town | Won | Only composer to win three consecutive awards in this category. | |
| 1950 | Roger Edens | Annie Get Your Gun | Won | Only composer to win three consecutive awards in this category. | |
| 1952 | Gian Carlo Menotti | The Medium | Nominated | | |
| 1968 | Jacques Demy | The Young Girls of Rochefort | Nominated | | |
| 1970 | Rod McKuen | A Boy Named Charlie Brown | Nominated | | |
| 1972 | Ralph Burns | Cabaret | Won | | |
| 1974 | Frederick Loewe | The Little Prince | Nominated | | |
| 1974 | Angela Morley | The Little Prince | Nominated | First openly transgender Academy Award nominee | |
| 1977 | Angela Morley | The Slipper and the Rose—The Story of Cinderella | Nominated | | |
| 1979 | Ralph Burns | All That Jazz | Won | | |
| 1982 | Ralph Burns | Annie | Nominated | | |

== Best Music, Original Song ==
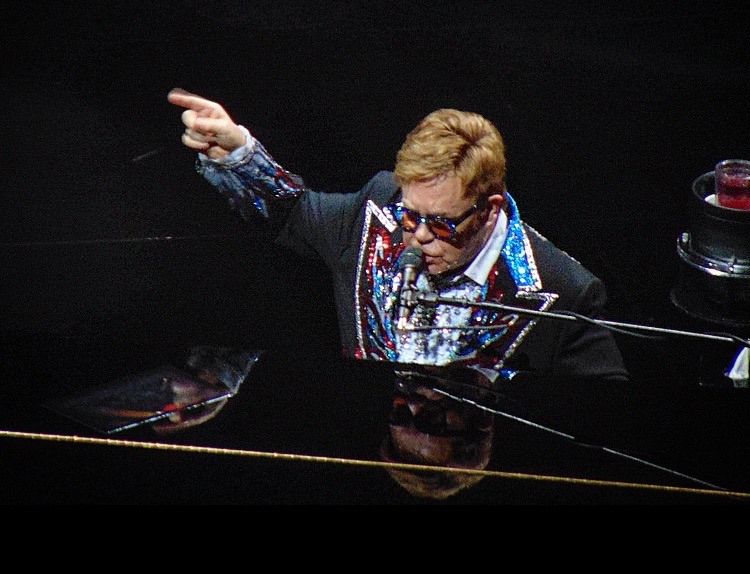
Elton John, gay, winner of 2 Oscars, nominated for 5.

Academy Award for Best Original Song
| Year | Name | Film | Song | Status | Demographic | Observation | Reference |
| 1936 | Cole Porter | Born to Dance | "I've Got You Under My Skin" | Nominated | Gay | | |
| 1940 | Roger Edens | Strike Up the Band | "Our Love Affair" | Nominated | Gay | | |
| 1941 | Cole Porter | You'll Never Get Rich | "Since I Kissed My Baby Goodbye" | Nominated | Gay | | |
| 1943 | Cole Porter | Something to Shout About | "You'd Be So Nice to Come Home To" | Nominated | Gay | | |
| 1947 | Roger Edens | Good News | "Pass That Peace Pipe" | Nominated | Gay | | |
| 1956 | Cole Porter | High Society | "True Love" | Nominated | Gay | | |
| 1958 | Frederick Loewe | Gigi | "Gigi" | Won | Gay | | |
| 1960 | Manos Hatzidakis | Never on Sunday | "Never on Sunday" | Won | Gay | | |
| 1965 | Jacques Demy | The Umbrellas of Cherbourg | "I Will Wait for You" | Nominated | Bisexual | | |
| 1969 | Rod McKuen | The Prime of Miss Jean Brodie | "Jean" | Nominated | Queer | | |
| 1974 | Frederick Loewe | The Little Prince | "Little Prince" | Nominated | Gay | | |
| 1975 | John Kander | Funny Lady | "How Lucky Can You Get" | Nominated | Gay | | |
| 1978 | Paul Jabara | Thank God It's Friday | "Last Dance" | Won | Gay | | |
| 1980 | Lesley Gore | Fame | "Out Here on My Own" | Nominated | Lesbian | | |
| 1980 | Dean Pitchford | Fame | "Fame" | Won | Gay | | |
| 1982 | Peter Allen | Arthur | "Arthur's Theme (Best That You Can Do)" | Won | Gay | | |
| 1984 | Dean Pitchford | Footloose | "Footloose" | Nominated | Gay | | |
| 1984 | Dean Pitchford | Footloose | "Let's Hear It for the Boy" | Nominated | Gay | | |
| 1986 | Howard Ashman | Little Shop of Horrors | "Mean Green Mother from Outer Space" | Nominated | Gay | | |
| 1989 | Dean Pitchford | Chances Are | "After All" | Nominated | Gay | | |
| 1989 | Howard Ashman | The Little Mermaid | "Kiss the Girl" | Nominated | Gay | | |
| 1989 | Howard Ashman | The Little Mermaid | "Under the Sea" | Won | Gay | | |
| 1990 | Stephen Sondheim | Dick Tracy | "Sooner or Later" | Won | Gay | | |
| 1991 | Howard Ashman | Beauty and the Beast | "Be Our Guest" | Nominated | Gay | First person with AIDS to be given both a posthumous award and nominations. First gay man to be awarded Best Original Song twice. | |
| 1991 | Howard Ashman | Beauty and the Beast | "Beauty and the Beast" | Won | Gay | First person with AIDS to be given both a posthumous award and nominations. First gay man to be awarded Best Original Song twice. | |
| 1991 | Howard Ashman | Beauty and the Beast | "Belle" | Nominated | Gay | First person with AIDS to be given both a posthumous award and nominations. First gay man to be awarded Best Original Song twice. | |
| 1992 | Howard Ashman | Aladdin | "Friend Like Me" | Nominated | Gay | First person with AIDS to be given both a posthumous award and nominations. First gay man to be awarded Best Original Song twice. | |
| 1993 | Marc Shaiman | Sleepless in Seattle | "A Wink and a Smile" | Nominated | Gay | | |
| 1994 | Elton John | The Lion King | "Can You Feel the Love Tonight" | Won | Gay | | |
| 1994 | Elton John | The Lion King | "Circle of Life" | Nominated | Gay | | |
| 1994 | Elton John | The Lion King | "Hakuna Matata" | Nominated | Gay | | |
| 1999 | Marc Shaiman | South Park: Bigger, Longer & Uncut | "Blame Canada" | Nominated | Gay | | |
| 2002 | John Kander | Chicago | "I Move On" | Nominated | Gay | | |
| 2006 | Melissa Etheridge | An Inconvenient Truth | "I Need to Wake Up" | Won | Lesbian | First openly lesbian winner for Original Song | |
| 2006 | Henry Krieger | Dreamgirls | "Listen" | Nominated | Gay | | |
| 2006 | Henry Krieger | Dreamgirls | "Love You I Do" | Nominated | Gay | | |
| 2006 | Henry Krieger | Dreamgirls | "Patience" | Nominated | Gay | | |
| 2015 | Anohni | Racing Extinction | "Manta Ray" | Nominated | Transgender | First openly transgender person nominated for Original Song | |
| 2015 | Lady Gaga | The Hunting Ground | "Til It Happens to You" | Nominated | Bisexual | | |
| 2015 | Sam Smith | Spectre | "Writing's on the Wall" | Won | Gay and non-binary | Incorrectly pronounced themself as the first ever openly gay person to win an Oscar during their acceptance speech after misinterpreting an interview where Sir Ian McKellen said no openly gay actor had ever won in the Leading Actor category. They later apologized for the mistake and justified their point was to shine a light on the LGBTQ community. | |
| 2016 | Benj Pasek | La La Land | "Audition (The Fools Who Dream)" | Nominated | Gay | | |
| 2016 | Benj Pasek | La La Land | "City of Stars" | Won | Gay | | |
| 2017 | Benj Pasek | The Greatest Showman | "This Is Me" | Nominated | Gay | | |
| 2017 | Sufjan Stevens | Call Me by Your Name | "Mystery of Love" | Nominated | Gay | | |
| 2018 | Lady Gaga | A Star Is Born | "Shallow" | Won | Bisexual | | |
| 2018 | Marc Shaiman | Mary Poppins Returns | "The Place Where Lost Things Go" | Nominated | Gay | | |
| 2018 | Scott Wittman | Mary Poppins Returns | "The Place Where Lost Things Go" | Nominated | Gay | | |
| 2019 | Elton John | Rocketman | "(I'm Gonna) Love Me Again" | Won | Gay | | |
| 2019 | Cynthia Erivo | Harriet | "Stand Up" | Nominated | Bisexual | | |
| 2021 | Billie Eilish | No Time to Die | "No Time to Die" | Won | Bisexual | | |
| 2022 | Lady Gaga | Top Gun: Maverick | "Hold My Hand" | Nominated | Bisexual | | |
| 2023 | Billie Eilish | Barbie | "What Was I Made For?" | Won | Bisexual | | |
| 2024 | Elton John | Elton John: Never Too Late | "Never Too Late" | Nominated | Gay | | |
| 2024 | Brandi Carlile | Elton John: Never Too Late | "Never Too Late" | Nominated | Lesbian | | |
| 2025 | Mark Sonnenblick | KPop Demon Hunters | "Golden" | Won | Gay | | |

== Best Picture ==
Academy Award for Best Picture
| Year | Name | Film | Status | Demographic | Reference |
| 1963 | Tony Richardson | Tom Jones | Won | Bisexual | |
| 1970 | Ross Hunter | Airport | Nominated | Gay | |
| 1977 | Arthur Laurents | The Turning Point | Nominated | Gay | |
| 1985 | David Weisman | Kiss of the Spider Woman | Nominated | Gay | |
| 1986 | Ismail Merchant | A Room with a View | Nominated | Gay | |
| 1992 | Ismail Merchant | Howards End | Nominated | Gay | |
| 1993 | Ismail Merchant | The Remains of the Day | Nominated | Gay | |
| 1999 | Bruce Cohen | American Beauty | Won | Gay | |
| 1999 | Dan Jinks | American Beauty | Won | Gay | |
| 2002 | Scott Rudin | The Hours | Nominated | Gay | |
| 2007 | Scott Rudin | No Country for Old Men | Won | Gay | |
| 2007 | Scott Rudin | There Will Be Blood | Nominated | Gay | |
| 2008 | Bruce Cohen | Milk | Nominated | Gay | |
| 2008 | Dan Jinks | Milk | Nominated | Gay | |
| 2009 | Lee Daniels | Precious | Nominated | Gay | |
| 2010 | Darla K. Anderson | Toy Story 3 | Nominated | Lesbian | |
| 2010 | Iain Canning | The King's Speech | Won | Gay | |
| 2010 | Scott Rudin | The Social Network | Nominated | Gay | |
| 2010 | Scott Rudin | True Grit | Nominated | Gay | |
| 2011 | Scott Rudin | Extremely Loud & Incredibly Close | Nominated | Gay | |
| 2012 | Bruce Cohen | Silver Linings Playbook | Nominated | Gay | |
| 2012 | Megan Ellison | Zero Dark Thirty | Nominated | Lesbian | |
| 2012 | Cameron Mackintosh | Les Misérables | Nominated | Gay | |
| 2013 | Megan Ellison | American Hustle | Nominated | Lesbian | |
| 2013 | Megan Ellison | Her | Nominated | Lesbian | |
| 2013 | Scott Rudin | Captain Phillips | Nominated | Gay | |
| 2014 | Scott Rudin | The Grand Budapest Hotel | Nominated | Gay | |
| 2016 | Scott Rudin | Fences | Nominated | Gay | |
| 2016 | Iain Canning | Lion | Nominated | Gay | |
| 2017 | Megan Ellison | Phantom Thread | Nominated | Lesbian | |
| 2017 | Luca Guadagnino | Call Me by Your Name | Nominated | Gay | |
| 2017 | Peter Spears | Call Me by Your Name | Nominated | Gay | |
| 2017 | Scott Rudin | Lady Bird | Nominated | Gay | |
| 2020 | Peter Spears | Nomadland | Won | Gay | |
| 2021 | Iain Canning | The Power of the Dog | Nominated | Gay | |
| 2022 | Tony Kushner | The Fabelmans | Nominated | Gay | |
| 2023 | Christine Vachon | Past Lives | Nominated | Lesbian | |

=== Best Picture winners and nominees with LGBTQ themes ===
| Year | Title | Status | Relevant Theme | Reference |
|---|---|---|---|---|
| 1969 | Midnight Cowboy | Won | Bisexual | |
| 1972 | Cabaret | Nominated | Bisexual | |
| 1975 | Dog Day Afternoon | Nominated | Transgender | |
| 1985 | Kiss of the Spider Woman | Nominated | Gay | |
| 1991 | The Silence of the Lambs | Won | Transgender | |
| 1992 | The Crying Game | Nominated | Transgender | |
| 1999 | American Beauty | Won | Gay | |
| 2002 | The Hours | Nominated | Lesbian and Gay | |
| 2005 | Brokeback Mountain | Nominated | Gay | |
| 2005 | Capote | Nominated | Gay | |
| 2008 | Milk | Nominated | Gay | |
| 2010 | Black Swan | Nominated | Bisexual | |
| 2010 | The Kids Are All Right | Nominated | Lesbian | |
| 2013 | Dallas Buyers Club | Nominated | Queer; Transgender | |
| 2014 | The Imitation Game | Nominated | Gay | |
| 2016 | Moonlight | Won | Gay | |
| 2017 | Call Me by Your Name | Nominated | Bisexual | |
| 2018 | Bohemian Rhapsody | Nominated | Bisexual | |
| 2018 | The Favourite | Nominated | Lesbian and Bisexual | |
| 2021 | The Power of the Dog | Nominated | Queer | |
| 2022 | Everything Everywhere All at Once | Won | Lesbian and Bisexual | |
| 2022 | Tár | Nominated | Lesbian and Bisexual | |
| 2023 | American Fiction | Nominated | Gay | |
| 2023 | Anatomy of a Fall | Nominated | Bisexual | |
| 2023 | Maestro | Nominated | Bisexual | |
| 2024 | Conclave | Nominated | Intersex | |
| 2024 | Emilia Pérez | Nominated | Transgender | |

=== Speculated to be LGBTQ ===
The following list is composed of producers who have been claimed to be LGBT by others. They have been outed by a third party either alive or after their death. However, they never publicly came out.

Academy Award for Best Picture
| Year | Name | Film | Status | Alleged demographic | Reference |
| 1952 | John Ford | The Quiet Man | Nominated | Gay or Bisexual | |
| 1978 | Michael Cimino | The Deer Hunter | Won | Transgender or Non-binary | |

== Best Production Design ==
Academy Award for Best Production Design
| Year | Name | Film | Status | Reference |
| 1936 | Edwin B. Willis | The Great Ziegfeld | Nominated | |
| 1936 | Edwin B. Willis | Romeo and Juliet | Nominated | |
| 1941 | Howard Bristol | The Little Foxes | Nominated | |
| 1941 | Samuel M. Comer | Hold Back the Dawn | Nominated | |
| 1941 | Edwin B. Willis | Blossoms in the Dust | Won | |
| 1941 | Edwin B. Willis | When Ladies Meet | Nominated | |
| 1942 | Howard Bristol | The Pride of the Yankees | Nominated | |
| 1942 | Samuel M. Comer | Take a Letter, Darling | Nominated | |
| 1942 | Jack D. Moore | Random Harvest | Nominated | |
| 1942 | Edwin B. Willis | Random Harvest | Nominated | |
| 1943 | Howard Bristol | The North Star | Nominated | |
| 1943 | George James Hopkins | Mission to Moscow | Nominated | |
| 1943 | George James Hopkins | This Is the Army | Nominated | |
| 1943 | Edwin B. Willis | Madame Curie | Nominated | |
| 1943 | Edwin B. Willis | Thousands Cheer | Nominated | |
| 1944 | Howard Bristol | The Princess and the Pirate | Nominated | |
| 1944 | Samuel M. Comer | No Time for Love | Nominated | |
| 1944 | Edwin B. Willis | Gaslight | Won | |
| 1944 | Edwin B. Willis | Kismet | Nominated | |
| 1944 | Richard Pefferle | Kismet | Nominated | |
| 1945 | Samuel M. Comer | Frenchman's Creek | Won | |
| 1945 | Samuel M. Comer | Love Letters | Nominated | |
| 1945 | Edwin B. Willis | National Velvet | Nominated | |
| 1945 | Edwin B. Willis | The Picture of Dorian Gray | Nominated | |
| 1946 | Samuel M. Comer | Kitty | Nominated | |
| 1946 | Paul S. Fox | The Razor's Edge | Nominated | |
| 1946 | Edwin B. Willis | The Yearling | Won | |
| 1947 | Paul S. Fox | The Foxes of Harrow | Nominated | |
| 1947 | George James Hopkins | Life with Father | Nominated | |
| 1949 | Paul S. Fox | Come to the Stable | Nominated | |
| 1949 | Jack D. Moore | Little Women | Won | |
| 1949 | Edwin B. Willis | Little Women | Won | |
| 1949 | Edwin B. Willis | Madame Bovary | Nominated | |
| 1950 | Samuel M. Comer | Samson and Delilah | Won | |
| 1950 | Samuel M. Comer | Sunset Boulevard | Won | |
| 1950 | Edwin B. Willis | Annie Get Your Gun | Nominated | |
| 1950 | Edwin B. Willis | The Red Danube | Nominated | |
| 1951 | Paul S. Fox | David and Bathsheba | Nominated | |
| 1951 | Paul S. Fox | House on Telegraph Hill | Nominated | |
| 1951 | F. Keogh Gleason | An American in Paris | Won | |
| 1951 | George James Hopkins | A Streetcar Named Desire | Won | |
| 1951 | Jack D. Moore | Too Young to Kiss | Nominated | |
| 1951 | Edwin B. Willis | An American in Paris | Won | |
| 1951 | Edwin B. Willis | Too Young to Kiss | Nominated | |
| 1952 | Howard Bristol | Hans Christian Andersen | Nominated | |
| 1952 | Paul S. Fox | The Snows of Kilimanjaro | Nominated | |
| 1952 | F. Keogh Gleason | The Bad and the Beautiful | Won | |
| 1952 | Arthur Krams | The Merry Widow | Nominated | |
| 1952 | Edwin B. Willis | The Bad and the Beautiful | Won | |
| 1952 | Edwin B. Willis | The Merry Widow | Nominated | |
| 1953 | Paul S. Fox | The President's Lady | Nominated | |
| 1953 | Paul S. Fox | The Robe | Won | |
| 1953 | F. Keogh Gleason | The Story of Three Loves | Nominated | |
| 1953 | Arthur Krams | Lili | Nominated | |
| 1953 | Arthur Krams | The Story of Three Loves | Nominated | |
| 1953 | Jack D. Moore | The Story of Three Loves | Nominated | |
| 1953 | Jack D. Moore | Young Bess | Nominated | |
| 1953 | Edwin B. Willis | Julius Caesar | Won | |
| 1953 | Edwin B. Willis | Lili | Nominated | |
| 1953 | Edwin B. Willis | The Story of Three Loves | Nominated | |
| 1953 | Edwin B. Willis | Young Bess | Nominated | |
| 1954 | Samuel M. Comer | The Country Girl | Nominated | |
| 1954 | Samuel M. Comer | Red Garters | Nominated | |
| 1954 | Samuel M. Comer | Sabrina | Nominated | |
| 1954 | Paul S. Fox | Désirée | Nominated | |
| 1954 | F. Keogh Gleason | Brigadoon | Nominated | |
| 1954 | George James Hopkins | A Star Is Born | Nominated | |
| 1954 | Irene Sharaff | A Star Is Born | Nominated | |
| 1954 | Edwin B. Willis | Brigadoon | Nominated | |
| 1954 | Edwin B. Willis | Executive Suite | Nominated | |
| 1955 | Howard Bristol | Guys and Dolls | Nominated | |
| 1955 | Samuel M. Comer | The Rose Tattoo | Won | |
| 1955 | Samuel M. Comer | To Catch a Thief | Nominated | |
| 1955 | Paul S. Fox | Daddy Long Legs | Nominated | |
| 1955 | Henry Grace | Blackboard Jungle | Nominated | |
| 1955 | Arthur Krams | The Rose Tattoo | Won | |
| 1955 | Arthur Krams | To Catch a Thief | Nominated | |
| 1955 | Oliver Smith | Guys and Dolls | Nominated | |
| 1955 | Edwin B. Willis | Blackboard Jungle | Nominated | |
| 1955 | Edwin B. Willis | I'll Cry Tomorrow | Nominated | |
| 1956 | Samuel M. Comer | The Proud and Profane | Nominated | |
| 1956 | Samuel M. Comer | The Ten Commandments | Nominated | |
| 1956 | Ross J. Dowd | Around the World in 80 Days | Nominated | |
| 1956 | Paul S. Fox | The King and I | Won | |
| 1956 | F. Keogh Gleason | Lust for Life | Nominated | |
| 1956 | F. Keogh Gleason | Somebody Up There Likes Me | Won | |
| 1956 | Edwin B. Willis | Lust for Life | Nominated | |
| 1956 | Edwin B. Willis | Somebody Up There Likes Me | Won | |
| 1957 | Samuel M. Comer | Funny Face | Nominated | |
| 1957 | Richard Pefferle | Les Girls | Nominated | |
| 1957 | Edwin B. Willis | Les Girls | Nominated | |
| 1957 | Edwin B. Willis | Raintree County | Nominated | |
| 1958 | Samuel M. Comer | Vertigo | Nominated | |
| 1958 | Paul S. Fox | A Certain Smile | Nominated | |
| 1958 | F. Keogh Gleason | Gigi | Won | |
| 1958 | Henry Grace | Gigi | Won | |
| 1958 | George James Hopkins | Auntie Mame | Nominated | |
| 1959 | Paul S. Fox | Career | Nominated | |
| 1959 | Henry Grace | North by Northwest | Nominated | |
| 1959 | Arthur Krams | Career | Nominated | |
| 1959 | Oliver Messel | Suddenly, Last Summer | Nominated | |
| 1960 | Samuel M. Comer | It Started in Naples | Nominated | |
| 1960 | Samuel M. Comer | Visit to a Small Planet | Nominated | |
| 1960 | Ross J. Dowd | The Facts of Life | Nominated | |
| 1960 | Henry Grace | Cimarron | Nominated | |
| 1960 | George James Hopkins | Sunrise at Campobello | Nominated | |
| 1960 | Arthur Krams | Visit to a Small Planet | Nominated | |
| 1961 | Howard Bristol | Flower Drum Song | Nominated | |
| 1961 | Samuel M. Comer | Breakfast at Tiffany's | Nominated | |
| 1961 | Samuel M. Comer | Summer and Smoke | Nominated | |
| 1961 | Piero Gherardi | La Dolce Vita | Nominated | |
| 1961 | Arthur Krams | Summer and Smoke | Nominated | |
| 1962 | Samuel M. Comer | The Pigeon That Took Rome | Nominated | |
| 1962 | Henry Grace | Mutiny on the Bounty | Nominated | |
| 1962 | Henry Grace | Period of Adjustment | Nominated | |
| 1962 | Henry Grace | The Wonderful World of the Brothers Grimm | Nominated | |
| 1962 | George James Hopkins | Days of Wine and Roses | Nominated | |
| 1962 | George James Hopkins | The Music Man | Nominated | |
| 1963 | Samuel M. Comer | Come Blow Your Horn | Nominated | |
| 1963 | Samuel M. Comer | Hud | Nominated | |
| 1963 | Samuel M. Comer | Love with the Proper Stranger | Nominated | |
| 1963 | Paul S. Fox | Cleopatra | Won | |
| 1963 | Piero Gherardi | 8½ | Nominated | |
| 1963 | Henry Grace | How the West Was Won | Nominated | |
| 1963 | Henry Grace | Twilight of Honor | Nominated | |
| 1964 | Cecil Beaton | My Fair Lady | Won | |
| 1964 | Henry Grace | The Americanization of Emily | Nominated | |
| 1964 | Henry Grace | The Unsinkable Molly Brown | Nominated | |
| 1964 | George James Hopkins | My Fair Lady | Won | |
| 1965 | Henry Grace | A Patch of Blue | Nominated | |
| 1965 | George James Hopkins | Inside Daisy Clover | Nominated | |
| 1966 | Piero Gherardi | Juliet of the Spirits | Nominated | |
| 1966 | Henry Grace | Mister Buddwing | Nominated | |
| 1966 | George James Hopkins | Who's Afraid of Virginia Woolf? | Won | |
| 1967 | Howard Bristol | Thoroughly Modern Millie | Nominated | |
| 1968 | Howard Bristol | Star! | Nominated | |
| 1969 | George James Hopkins | Hello, Dolly! | Won | |
| 1969 | Jack D. Moore | Sweet Charity | Nominated | |
| 1970 | Samuel M. Comer | Tora! Tora! Tora! | Nominated | |
| 1970 | Arthur Krams | Tora! Tora! Tora! | Nominated | |
| 1970 | Jack D. Moore | Airport | Nominated | |
| 1982 | Franco Zeffirelli | La Traviata | Nominated | |
| 1987 | Ferdinando Scarfiotti | The Last Emperor | Won | |
| 1992 | Ferdinando Scarfiotti | Toys | Nominated | |
| 2005 | Jan Pascale | Good Night, and Good Luck | Nominated | |
| 2012 | Lee Sandales | War Horse | Nominated | |
| 2020 | Jan Pascale | Mank | Won | |
| 2020 | Lee Sandales | 1917 | Nominated | |
| 2024 | Lee Sandales | Wicked | Won | |

== Best Short Film (Animated) ==
Academy Award for Best Animated Short Film
| Year | Name | Film | Status | Demographic | Reference |
| 1969 | Ryan Larkin | Walking | Nominated | Bisexual | |
| 2003 | Adam Elliot | Harvie Krumpet | Won | Gay | |
| 2020 | Adrien Merigeau | Genius Loci | Nominated | Non-Binary | |

== Best Short Film (Live Action) ==
Academy Award for Best Live Action Short Film
| Year | Name | Film | Status | Demographic | Reference |
| 1952 | Norman McLaren | Neighbours | Nominated | Gay | |
| 1957 | Norman McLaren | A Chairy Tale | Nominated | Gay | |
| 1960 | Ismail Merchant | The Creation of Woman | Nominated | Gay | |
| 1992 | Christian Taylor | The Lady in Waiting | Nominated | Gay | |
| 1994 | Randy Stone | Trevor | Won | Gay | |
| 2020 | Travon Free | Two Distant Strangers | Won | Bisexual | |
| 2025 | Lee Knight | A Friend of Dorothy | Nominated | Gay | |

== Best Sound Mixing ==
Academy Award for Best Sound Mixing
| Year | Name | Film | Status | Demographic | Reference |
| 2008 | Lora Hirschberg | The Dark Knight | Nominated | Lesbian | |
| 2010 | Lora Hirschberg | Inception | Won | Lesbian | |

== Best Visual Effects ==
Academy Award for Best Visual Effects
| Year | Name | Film | Status | Demographic | Reference |
| 2025 | Charmaine Chan | Jurassic World Rebirth | Nominated | Queer | |

== Best Writing (Adapted Screenplay) ==
Academy Award for Best Adapted Screenplay
| Year | Name | Film | Adapted from | Status | Milestone | Demographic | Reference |
| 1944 | John Van Druten | Gaslight | Gaslight by Patrick Hamilton | Nominated | | Gay | |
| 1951 | Tennessee Williams | A Streetcar Named Desire | A Streetcar Named Desire by Tennessee Williams | Nominated | | Gay | |
| 1956 | Tennessee Williams | Baby Doll | 27 Wagons Full of Cotton and The Unsatisfactory Supper by Tennessee Williams | Nominated | | Gay | |
| 1958 | Terence Rattigan | Separate Tables | Separate Tables by Terence Rattigan | Nominated | | Gay | |
| 1958 | Alec Guinness | The Horse's Mouth | The Horse's Mouth by Joyce Cary | Nominated | (See note above in Best Actor section.) | Bisexual | |
| 1960 | Gavin Lambert | Sons and Lovers | Sons and Lovers by D.H. Lawrence | Nominated | | Gay | |
| 1970 | Larry Kramer | Women in Love | Women in Love by D.H. Lawrence | Nominated | | Gay | |
| 1973 | James Bridges | The Paper Chase | The Paper Chase by John Jay Osborn Jr. | Nominated | | Gay | |
| 1974 | Paul Dehn | Murder on the Orient Express | Murder on the Orient Express by Agatha Christie | Nominated | | Gay | |
| 1977 | Gavin Lambert | I Never Promised You a Rose Garden | I Never Promised You a Rose Garden by Joanne Greenberg | Nominated | | Gay | |
| 1977 | Peter Shaffer | Equus | Equus by Peter Shaffer | Nominated | | Gay | |
| 1980 | David Stevens | Breaker Morant | Breaker Morant by Kenneth G. Ross | Nominated | | Gay | |
| 1984 | Peter Shaffer | Amadeus | Amadeus by Peter Shaffer | Won | | Gay | |
| 1994 | Alan Bennett | The Madness of King George | The Madness of George III by Alan Bennett | Nominated | | Bisexual | |
| 1998 | Bill Condon | Gods and Monsters | Father of Frankenstein by Christopher Bram | Won | | Gay | |
| 2002 | Bill Condon | Chicago | Chicago by Fred Ebb and Bob Fosse | Nominated | | Gay | |
| 2005 | Tony Kushner | Munich | Vengeance by George Jonas | Nominated | | Gay | |
| 2010 | Lee Unkrich | Toy Story 3 | Characters from the film Toy Story by Pete Docter, Lasseter, Joe Ranft, & Stanton | Nominated | | Bisexual | |
| 2011 | John Logan | Hugo | The Invention of Hugo Cabret by Brian Selznick | Nominated | | Gay | |
| 2011 | Jim Rash | The Descendants | The Descendants by Kaui Hart Hemmings | Won | | Gay | |
| 2012 | Tony Kushner | Lincoln | Team of Rivals: The Political Genius of Abraham Lincoln by Doris Kearns Goodwin | Nominated | | Gay | |
| 2015 | Emma Donoghue | Room | Room by Emma Donoghue | Nominated | | Lesbian | |
| 2015 | Phyllis Nagy | Carol | The Price of Salt by Patricia Highsmith | Nominated | | Lesbian | |
| 2016 | Tarell Alvin McCraney | Moonlight | In Moonlight Black Boys Look Blue by Tarell Alvin McCraney | Won | | Gay | |
| 2017 | James Ivory | Call Me by Your Name | Call Me by Your Name by André Aciman | Won | | Gay | |
| 2017 | Dee Rees | Mudbound | Mudbound by Hillary Jordan | Nominated | First queer black woman to be nominated for a screenplay Oscar | Lesbian | |
| 2018 | Jeff Whitty | Can You Ever Forgive Me? | Can You Ever Forgive Me? by Lee Israel | Nominated | | Gay | |

== Best Writing (Original Screenplay) ==
Academy Award for Best Original Screenplay
| Year | Name | Film | Status | Demographic | Reference |
| 1942 | Noël Coward | In Which We Serve | Nominated | Gay | |
| 1942 | George Oppenheimer | The War Against Mrs. Hadley | Nominated | Gay | |
| 1952 | Terence Rattigan | The Sound Barrier | Nominated | Gay | |
| 1961 | William Inge | Splendor in the Grass | Won | Gay | |
| 1965 | Jacques Demy | The Umbrellas of Cherbourg | Nominated | Bisexual | |
| 1968 | Arthur C. Clarke | 2001: A Space Odyssey | Nominated | Gay | |
| 1969 | Luchino Visconti | The Damned | Nominated | Gay | |
| 1977 | Arthur Laurents | The Turning Point | Nominated | Gay | |
| 1979 | James Bridges | The China Syndrome | Nominated | Gay | |
| 1986 | Hanif Kureishi | My Beautiful Laundrette | Nominated | Bisexual | |
| 1990 | Bruce Joel Rubin | Ghost | Won | Gay | |
| 1993 | Ron Nyswaner | Philadelphia | Nominated | Gay | |
| 1999 | Alan Ball | American Beauty | Won | Gay | |
| 2000 | John Logan | Gladiator | Nominated | Gay | |
| 2002 | Pedro Almodóvar | Talk to Her | Won | Gay | |
| 2002 | Todd Haynes | Far from Heaven | Nominated | Gay | |
| 2004 | John Logan | The Aviator | Nominated | Gay | |
| 2008 | Dustin Lance Black | Milk | Won | Gay | |
| 2010 | Lisa Cholodenko | The Kids Are All Right | Nominated | Lesbian | |
| 2015 | Jonathan Herman | Straight Outta Compton | Nominated | Gay | |
| 2022 | Tony Kushner | The Fabelmans | Nominated | Gay | |

=== Speculated to be LGBTQ ===
The following list is composed of writers who have been claimed to be LGBT by others. They have been outed by a third party either alive or after their death. However, they never publicly came out.

Academy Award for Best Writing (Original Screenplay)
| Year | Name | Film | Status | Alleged demographic | Reference |
| 1978 | Michael Cimino | The Deer Hunter | Nominated | Transgender or Non-binary | |

== Best Writing (Original Story) ==
Academy Award for Best Original Story
| Year | Name | Film | Status | Demographic | Reference |
| 1946 | John Patrick | The Strange Love of Martha Ivers | Nominated | Gay | |
| 1950 | Leonard Spigelgass | Mystery Street | Nominated | Gay | |
| 1951 | James Bernard | Seven Days to Noon | Won | Gay | |
| 1951 | Paul Dehn | Seven Days to Noon | Won | Gay | |
| 1955 | Nicholas Ray | Rebel Without a Cause | Nominated | Bisexual | |

== Governors Awards ==
The Governors Awards are an annual ceremony hosted by the Academy of Motion Picture Arts and Sciences dedicated to honor actors and filmmakers with lifetime achievement awards. Three awards are given: the Academy Honorary Award, the Jean Hersholt Humanitarian Award, and the Irving G. Thalberg Memorial Award. Unlike the Academy Awards, the nominations and voting for these awards are restricted to members of the Board of Governors of AMPAS.

The Academy Honorary Award honors exceptional career achievements, contributions to the motion picture industry, and service to the academy. The Academy Honorary Award is often awarded in preference to those with noted achievements in motion pictures who have nevertheless never won an Academy Award. Thus, many of its recipients are Classic Hollywood stars, such as Lillian Gish, Barbara Stanwyck, Kirk Douglas, and Lauren Bacall.

Among its Honorary Awards for acting, the academy also presents deserving young actors with the Special Juvenile Academy Award. (Most of those are not listed here; some of the early "Special Awards" that later became known in that acting category as the "Special Juvenile Academy Award" are listed with "Special Award" added parenthetically.)

The Jean Hersholt Humanitarian Award honors an individual's outstanding contributions to humanitarian causes.

The Irving G. Thalberg Memorial Award honors creative producers, whose bodies of work reflect a consistently high quality of motion picture production.

Governors Awards
| Year | Name | Award | Achievement | Demographic | Reference |
| 1942 | Noël Coward | Academy Honorary Award | For his outstanding production achievement in In Which We Serve. (Certificate of Merit) | Gay | |
| 1954 | Greta Garbo | Academy Honorary Award | For her unforgettable screen performances. (Statuette) | Bisexual (Alleged) | |
| 1961 | Jerome Robbins | Academy Honorary Award | For his brilliant achievements in the art of choreography on film. (Statuette) | Bisexual | |
| 1969 | Cary Grant | Academy Honorary Award | For his unique mastery of the art of screen acting with the respect and affection of his colleagues. (Statuette) | Bisexual (Alleged) | |
| 1973 | Henri Langlois | Academy Honorary Award | For his devotion to the art of film, his massive contributions in preserving its past and his unswerving faith in its future. (Statuette) | Gay | |
| 1979 | Alec Guinness | Academy Honorary Award | For advancing the art of screen acting through a host of memorable and distinguished performances. (Statuette) | Bisexual | |
| 2013 | Piero Tosi | Academy Honorary Award | A visionary whose incomparable costume designs shaped timeless, living art in motion pictures. (Statuette) | Gay | |
| 2014 | Angelina Jolie | Jean Hersholt Humanitarian Award | Outstanding contributions to humanitarian causes. (Statuette) | Bisexual | |
