= The President's Lady =

1953 film directed by Henry Levin

- Film poster
- Directed by: Henry Levin
- Screenplay by: John Patrick
- Based on: The President's Lady by Irving Stone
- Produced by: Sol C. Siegel
- Starring: Susan Hayward; Charlton Heston
- Cinematography: Leo Tover
- Edited by: William B. Murphy
- Music by: Alfred Newman
- Production company: 20th Century Fox
- Distributed by: 20th Century Fox
- Release date: May 21, 1953
- Running time: 97 minutes
- Country: United States
- Language: English
- Budget: $1,475,000
- Box office: $1.35 million (US rentals)

The President's Lady is a 1953 biopic by 20th Century Fox directed by Henry Levin. The screenplay by John Patrick was adapted from the eponymous 1951 novel by Irving Stone, based on the life of American president Andrew Jackson and his marriage to Rachel Donelson Robards. Sol C. Siegel produced the film with Levin as associate producer. The musical score is by Alfred Newman and the cinematography by Leo Tover.

The film stars Susan Hayward and Charlton Heston with John McIntire and Fay Bainter. It was nominated for the Academy Award for Best Art Direction: Lyle R. Wheeler, Leland Fuller and Paul S. Fox and for Best Costume Design: Charles LeMaire and Renié. Andrew Jackson IV, a great-grandson of Andrew Jackson, lived in Los Angeles and played a U.S. Senator in the background of an inauguration scene.

Charlton Heston played Andrew Jackson once again in The Buccaneer (1958).

== Plot ==
In 1789, Rachel Donelson Robards meets Tennessee's attorney general, Andrew Jackson, for the first time when he seeks room and board at her mother's farm near Nashville. John Overton, Andrew's law partner and Rachel's cousin, had recommended Andrew, and Mrs. Donelson welcomes the young attorney, who also has experience fighting Indians. Andrew becomes infatuated with the lovely Rachel and is disappointed when her moody husband, Lewis Robards, comes from Harrodsburg to ask her to return home. Lewis apologizes for his jealous, antagonistic behavior, but upon their return, Rachel discovers that Lewis has been having an affair with a slave girl. The sympathetic Mrs. Robards writes to Mrs. Donelson, telling her that Rachel wishes to go back to Nashville, and Mrs. Donelson sends Andrew to retrieve her. Infuriated, Lewis pulls a gun on Andrew, but Andrew easily disarms him and leaves with Rachel. The couple evade a band of Indians, then stop for the night at an inn to avoid further danger. When they arrive at the farm in the morning, they learn that Lewis has arrived before them. Lewis demands that Rachel leave with him, and when she refuses, he threatens to return the following morning with gun-toting relatives. Desperate to protect Rachel, Mrs. Donelson asks flatboat owners Capt. and Mrs. Stark to take Rachel to Natchez, but the Starks refuse to accept the responsibility unless a man accompanies Rachel. Andrew volunteers, and after they fend off an Indian attack, the couple kiss and realize that they have fallen in love.

In Spanish-controlled Natchez, Andrew tells Rachel that she could obtain an annulment there and they could marry, but that their marriage would not be legal in the United States. Rachel refuses to let Andrew give up his career and asks him to return to Nashville to obtain a divorce for her. Before he leaves, however, Andrew receives a letter from John announcing that Lewis has gotten a divorce, charging Rachel with adultery. Although she is crushed by the accusation, Rachel marries Andrew, and after they return to Nashville, the couple spend two happy years together. Rachel is sad that they do not have children, but is content to be with Andrew. One day, John arrives with news that he had been mistaken, as Lewis had only petitioned for a divorce without actually obtaining one. Now, however, Lewis has divorced Rachel on grounds of adultery. Rachel begs Andrew to marry her again, although he believes that holding another ceremony will be an admission that they were in the wrong. After the wedding, Rachel and Andrew go to town, where Lewis' cousin Jason makes a crude remark about Rachel. Andrew almost beats Jason to death before being pulled away, then, during the drive home, Andrew and Rachel learn that Rachel's brother has been killed by Indians. Heading a militia troop, Andrew leaves to fight the Indians, and Rachel and her slave Moll work the fields alone for a year and a half until Andrew returns. Rachel is delighted to see her husband, and overjoyed that he has brought her an orphaned Indian infant, whom they name Lincoya.

Though Andrew was forced to sell their home to equip his men, he soon builds Rachel a fine new home in Nashville, which they call "The Hermitage." Rachel spends the next eight years happily, although Andrew is often gone fighting Indians or serving in Congress. One day, Rachel is invited to join a ladies' club, but is upset to learn that most of the women, still believing that Rachel is an adulteress, have refused to allow her admittance. Humiliated, Rachel returns home, where she is horrified to discover that Lincoya has died suddenly during her brief absence. Andrew finally comes home, and soon makes a large gentleman's wager on a horse race. Rachel is thrilled when Andrew wins and is told that he has been appointed the general of the state militia. Jealous Charles Dickinson makes a cutting remark about Andrew stealing another man's wife, however, and Andrew again loses his temper and challenges Dickinson to a duel. Rachel begs Andrew not to fight, but he insists on defending her honor. During the duel, Andrew is seriously wounded but manages to kill Dickinson. Although she is glad to have her husband home, Rachel is heartbroken that their lives have again been disrupted by scandalmongers. Andrew promises Rachel that he will lift her so high that no one will dare whisper a word against her, but his promise is delayed by the war of 1812, during which he is away fighting for two years.

Andrew returns home a hero, but when politics call again, he returns to Washington, leaving Rachel home alone. Finally, in 1825, Andrew is persuaded to run for president, although John warns him that his enemies will run a virulent campaign against him and he will have to control his temper. Rachel, who is in failing health, sneaks out one night to listen to Andrew speak at a rally, and is crushed to hear the jeering crowd yell out that they will not have a murderer for a president or a prostitute as the first lady. Rachel collapses as she stumbles through the streets, and Andrew stays by her bedside night and day. When Andrew receives word that he has won the election, Rachel tearfully acknowledges that he kept his promise to raise her to grand heights. She then tells him that she will not be able to accompany him, and with her dying breath, asks him not to carry spite with him. Soon after, in Washington, just before his inaugural speech, Andrew gazes at a miniature of Rachel and vows that his memories will keep him company for the rest of his life.

== Cast ==
- Susan Hayward as Rachel Donelson
- Charlton Heston as Andrew Jackson
- John McIntire as John Overton
- Fay Bainter as Mrs. Donaldson
- Whitfield Connor as Lewis Robards
- Carl Betz as Charles Dickinson
- Gladys Hurlbut as Mrs. Phariss
- Ruth Attaway as Moll
- Charles Dingle as Capt. Irwin
- Nina Varela as Mrs. 'Peachblossom' Stark
- Margaret Wycherly as Mrs. Robards
- Ralph Dumke as Col. Stark
- John George as Spectator (uncredited)
- Sam McDaniel as Servant (uncredited)

Andrew Jackson's great-grandson Andrew Jackson IV played a U.S. Senator in one scene in the film.
