= Paul S. Fox =

American set decorator

Paul Samuel Fox
- Born: September 30, 1898
- Died: May 1972 (aged 73)
- Occupation: Set decorator
- Years active: 1942-1964

Paul Samuel Fox (September 30, 1898 – May 1972) was an American set decorator. He won three Academy Awards and was nominated for ten more in the category Best Art Direction.

== Selected filmography ==
Fox won three Academy Awards for Best Art Direction and was nominated for ten more:

Won

- The Robe (1953)
- The King and I (1956)
- Cleopatra (1963)

Nominated

- The Razor's Edge (1946)
- The Foxes of Harrow (1947)
- Come to the Stable (1949)
- David and Bathsheba (1951)
- The House on Telegraph Hill (1951)
- The Snows of Kilimanjaro (1952)
- The President's Lady (1953)
- Desirée (1954)
- Daddy Long Legs (1955)
- A Certain Smile (1958)
