= Henry Grace =

Set decorator

Henry Wooten Grace
- Born: March 20, 1907
- Died: September 16, 1983 (aged 76)
- Occupation: Set decorator
- Years active: 1935-1970

Henry Wooten Grace (March 20, 1907 – September 16, 1983) was an American set decorator. He won an Oscar and was nominated for twelve more in the category Best Art Direction. As an actor, he had a role as General Dwight D. Eisenhower, whom he strongly resembled, in the film The Longest Day.

== Selected filmography ==
Grace won an Academy Award for Best Art Direction and was nominated for twelve more:

Won

- Gigi (1958)

Nominated

- Blackboard Jungle (1955)
- North by Northwest (1959)
- Cimarron (1960)
- The Longest Day (1962)
- The Wonderful World of the Brothers Grimm (1962)
- Mutiny on the Bounty (1962)
- Period of Adjustment (1962)
- How the West Was Won (1962)
- Twilight of Honor (1963)
- The Unsinkable Molly Brown (1964)
- The Americanization of Emily (1964)
- A Patch of Blue (1965)
- Mister Buddwing (1966)
