= Samuel M. Comer =

American set decorator (1893–1974)

- Born: July 13, 1893; Topeka, Kansas, U.S.
- Died: December 27, 1974 (aged 81); La Jolla, California, U.S.
- Years active: 1934–1968
- Children: Anjanette Comer (b. 1939)
- Awards: Best Art Direction - Color; 1945: Frenchman's Creek; 1950: Samson and Delilah; Best Art Direction - Black and White; 1950: Sunset Boulevard; 1955: The Rose Tattoo

Samuel M. Comer (July 13, 1893 – December 27, 1974) was a set decorator who worked on over 300 films during a career spanning four decades. He won four Academy Awards and was nominated for another 22 in the category Best Art Direction.

He guided his niece, Anjanette Comer, into "the biz."

== Academy Awards ==
Won

- The Rose Tattoo (1955)
- Sunset Boulevard (1950)
- Samson and Delilah (1949)
- Frenchman's Creek (1944)

Nominated

- Hud (1963)
- Love with the Proper Stranger (1963)
- Come Blow Your Horn (1963)
- The Pigeon That Took Rome (1962)
- Breakfast at Tiffany's (1961)
- Summer and Smoke (1961)
- Visit to a Small Planet (1960)
- It Started in Naples (1960)
- Career (1959)
- Vertigo (1958)
- Funny Face (1957)
- The Proud and Profane (1956)
- The Ten Commandments (1956)
- To Catch a Thief (1955)
- The Country Girl (1954)
- Sabrina (1954)
- Red Garters (1954)
- Kitty (1945)
- Love Letters (1945)
- No Time for Love (1943)
- Take a Letter, Darling (1942)
- Hold Back the Dawn (1941)
