= Take a Letter, Darling =

1942 film

- Film poster
- Directed by: Mitchell Leisen
- Screenplay by: Claude Binyon
- Story by: George Beck
- Produced by: Fred Kohlmar (associate producer); Mitchell Leisen
- Starring: Rosalind Russell
- Cinematography: John J. Mescall
- Edited by: Doane Harrison; Thomas Scott
- Music by: Victor Young
- Distributed by: Paramount Pictures
- Release date: May 6, 1942
- Running time: 92 minutes
- Country: United States
- Language: English
- Box office: $1.8 million (US rentals)

Take a Letter, Darling is a 1942 American romantic comedy film directed by Mitchell Leisen and starring Rosalind Russell. It was nominated for three Academy Awards; Best Cinematography, Best Score and Best Art Direction (Hans Dreier, Roland Anderson, Samuel M. Comer).

== Plot ==
A struggling painter (Fred MacMurray) takes a job as private secretary to a tough female advertising executive (Rosalind Russell). While working together to win the account of a tobacco company, they end up falling in love.

== Cast ==
- Rosalind Russell as A.M. MacGregor
- Fred MacMurray as Tom Verney
- Macdonald Carey as Jonathan Caldwell
- Constance Moore as Ethel Caldwell
- Robert Benchley as G.B. Atwater
- Charles Arnt as Fud Newton (as Charles E. Arnt)
- Cecil Kellaway as Uncle George
- Kathleen Howard as Aunt Minnie
- Margaret Seddon as Aunt Judy
- Dooley Wilson as Moses
- George Reed as Sam French
- Margaret Hayes as Sally French
- Sonny Boy Williams as Micky Dowling
- John Holland as Ex-Secretary

== Radio adaptation ==
Date	Program	Star(s)
June 19, 1942	Philip Morris Playhouse	Melvyn Douglas
February 1, 1951	Screen Directors Playhouse	Russell and MacMurray
