= 33rd Academy Awards =

- Official poster
- Date: April 17, 1961
- Site: Santa Monica Civic Auditorium, Santa Monica, California
- Hosted by: Bob Hope
- Produced by: Arthur Freed
- Directed by: Richard Dunlap

Highlights
- Best Picture: The Apartment
- Most awards: The Apartment (5)
- Most nominations: The Apartment (10)

TV in the United States
- Network: ABC

The 33rd Academy Awards, honoring the best in film for 1960, were held on April 17, 1961, hosted by Bob Hope at the Santa Monica Civic Auditorium in Santa Monica, California. This was the first ceremony to be aired on ABC television, which has aired the Academy Awards ever since (except between 1971 and 1975, when they were aired on NBC for the first time since the previous year).

Billy Wilder's The Apartment won Best Picture, the last black-and-white film to do so until Schindler's List and The Artist at the 66th and 84th Academy Awards, respectively.

Elizabeth Taylor, who had a near-fatal bout with pneumonia a short time before the ceremony, was viewed as having received her Oscar out of sympathy rather than for her performance in BUtterfield 8.

Gary Cooper was selected by the Academy Board of Governors to receive an Academy Honorary Award "for his many memorable screen performances and the international recognition he, as an individual, has gained for the motion picture industry". Cooper was too ill to attend the ceremony, though his condition was not publicly disclosed; James Stewart, a close friend of Cooper, accepted the Oscar on his behalf. Stewart's emotional speech hinted that something was seriously wrong, and the following day newspapers ran the headline, "Gary Cooper has cancer". Cooper died less than four weeks later.

Rising star Hayley Mills was selected by the Academy Board of Governors as the year's recipient of the Academy Juvenile Award for her breakthrough and acclaimed performance in Walt Disney's Pollyanna. She was the last recipient of the award; going forward, juvenile actors could officially compete in competitive categories. This was the first year a red carpet lined the walk into the theater.

== Winners and nominees ==
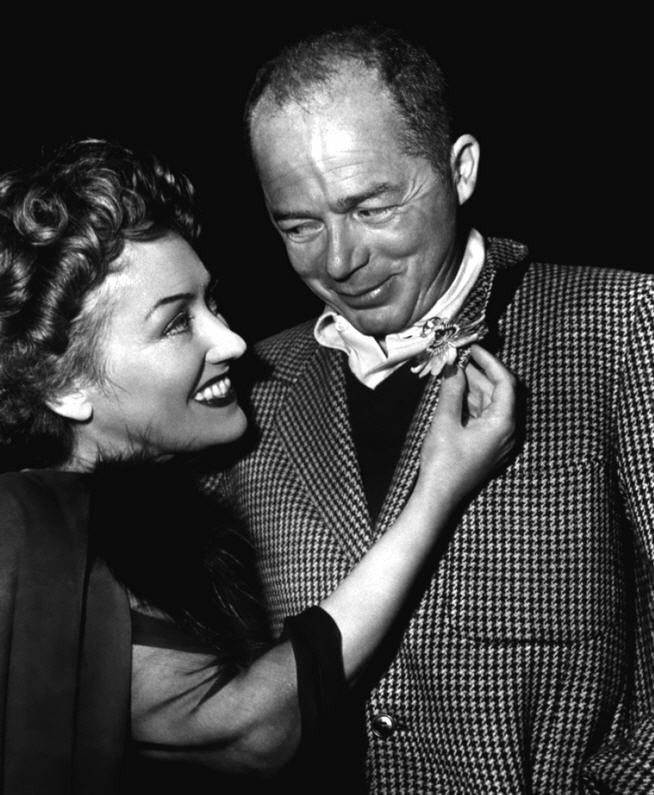
Billy Wilder (right); Best Picture and Best Director winner and Best Story and Screenplay Written Directly for the Screen co-winner

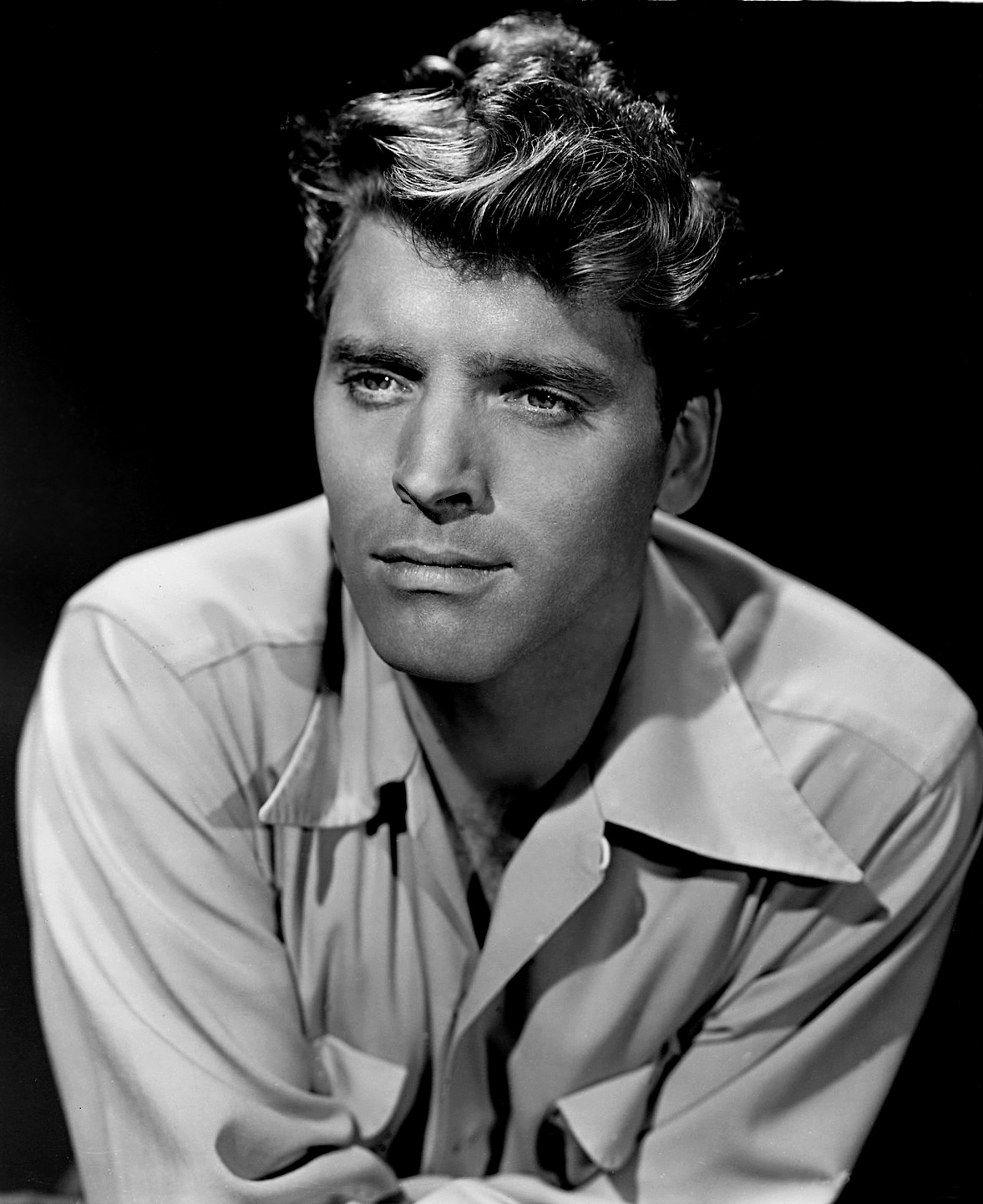
Burt Lancaster; Best Actor winner

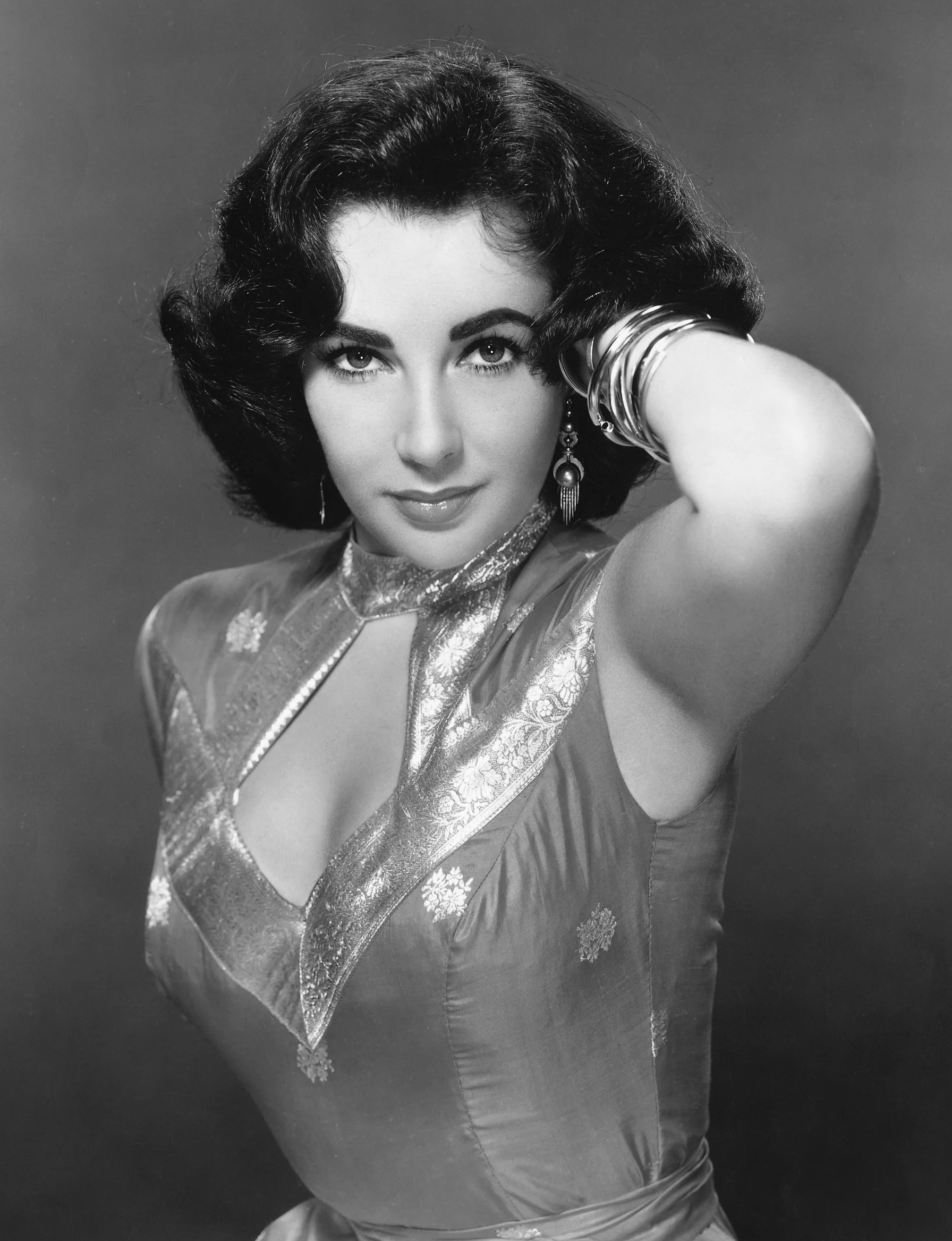
Elizabeth Taylor; Best Actress winner

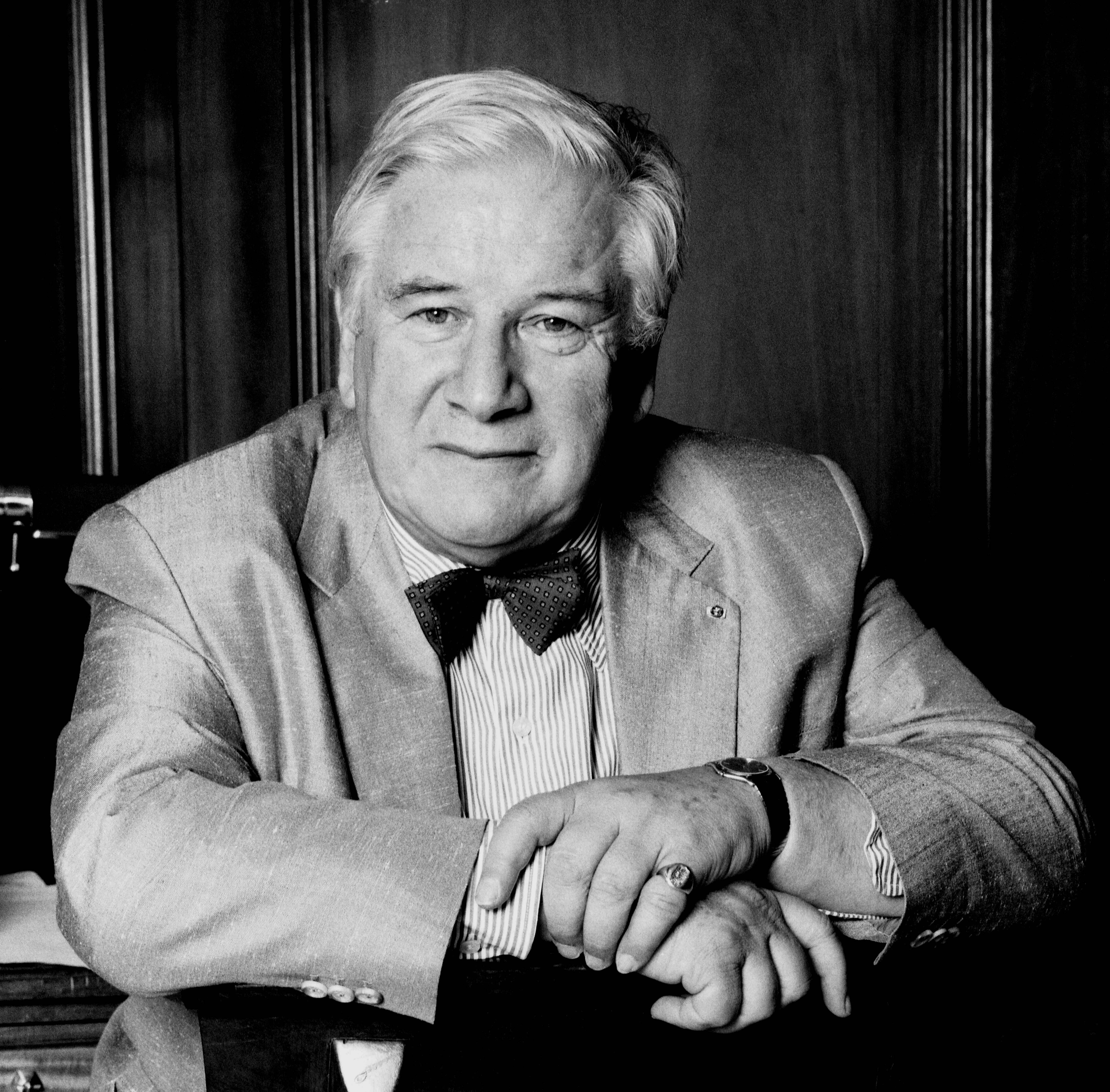
Peter Ustinov; Best Supporting Actor winner

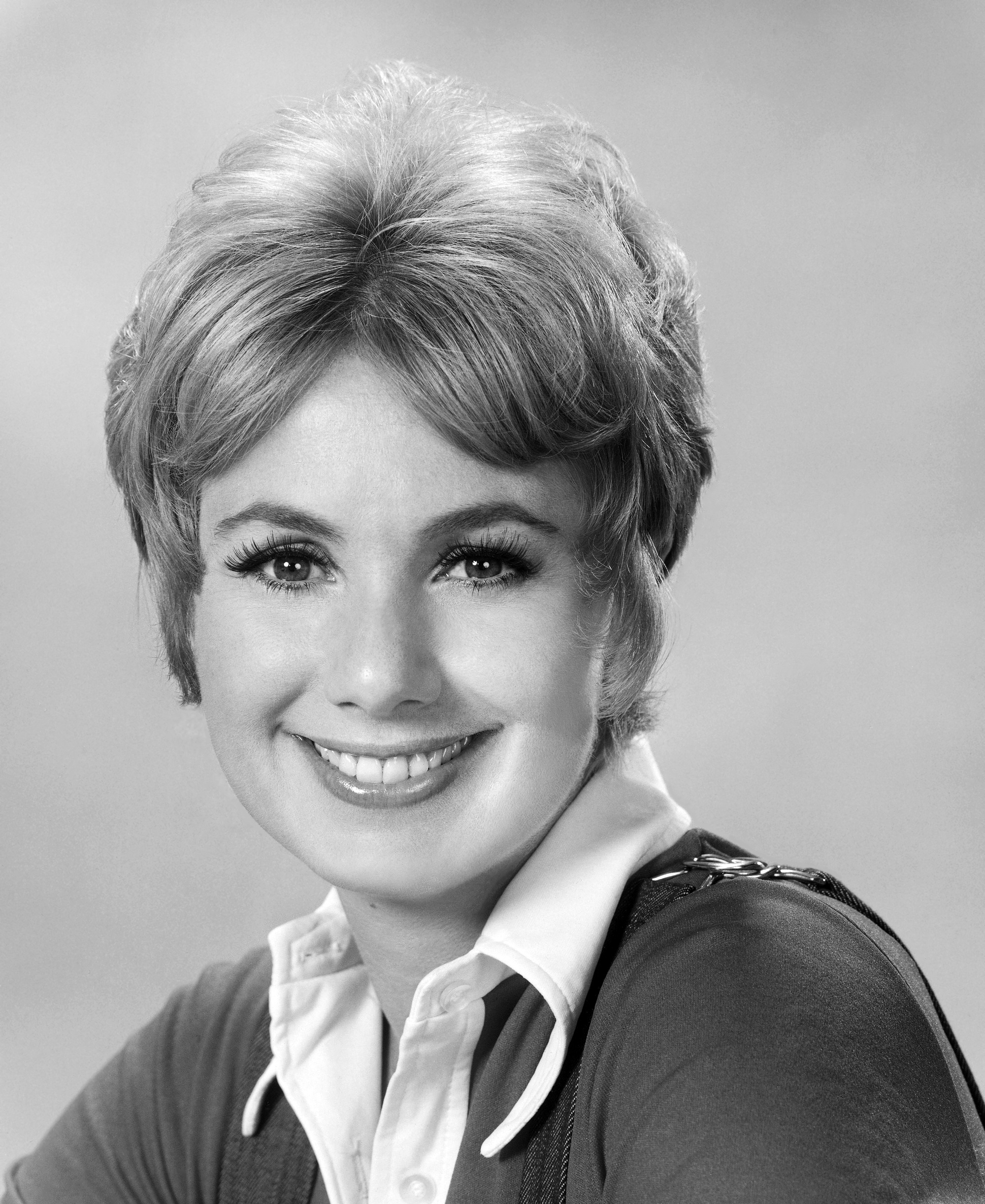
Shirley Jones; Best Supporting Actress winner

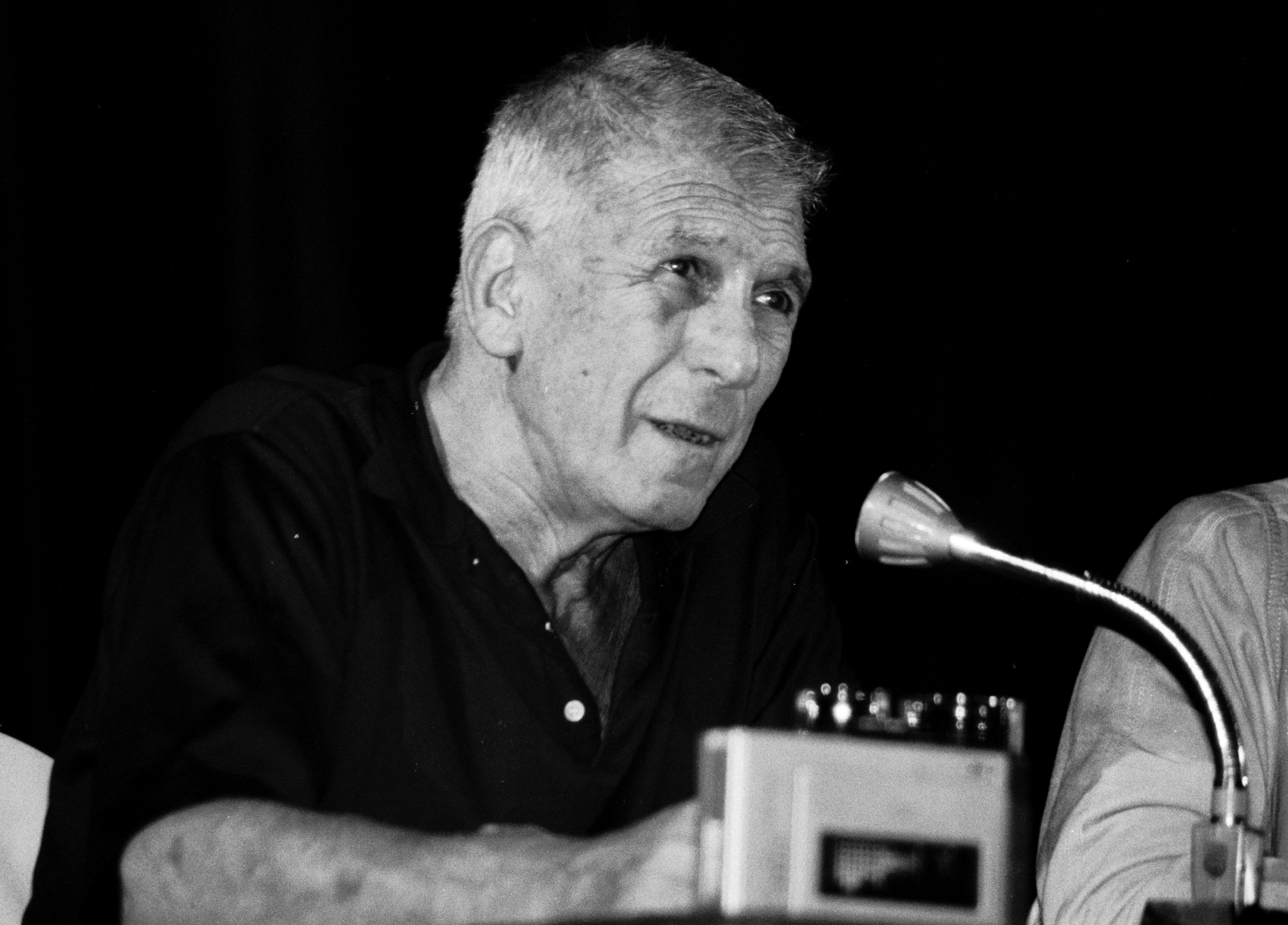
Richard Brooks; Best Screenplay Based on Material from Another Medium winner

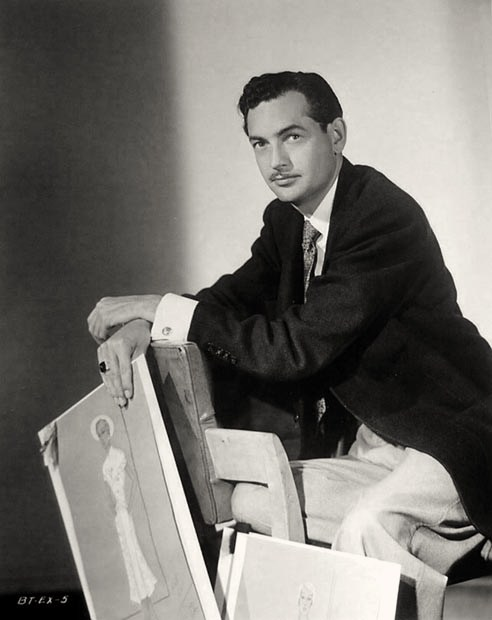
Bill Thomas; Best Costume Design, Color co-winner

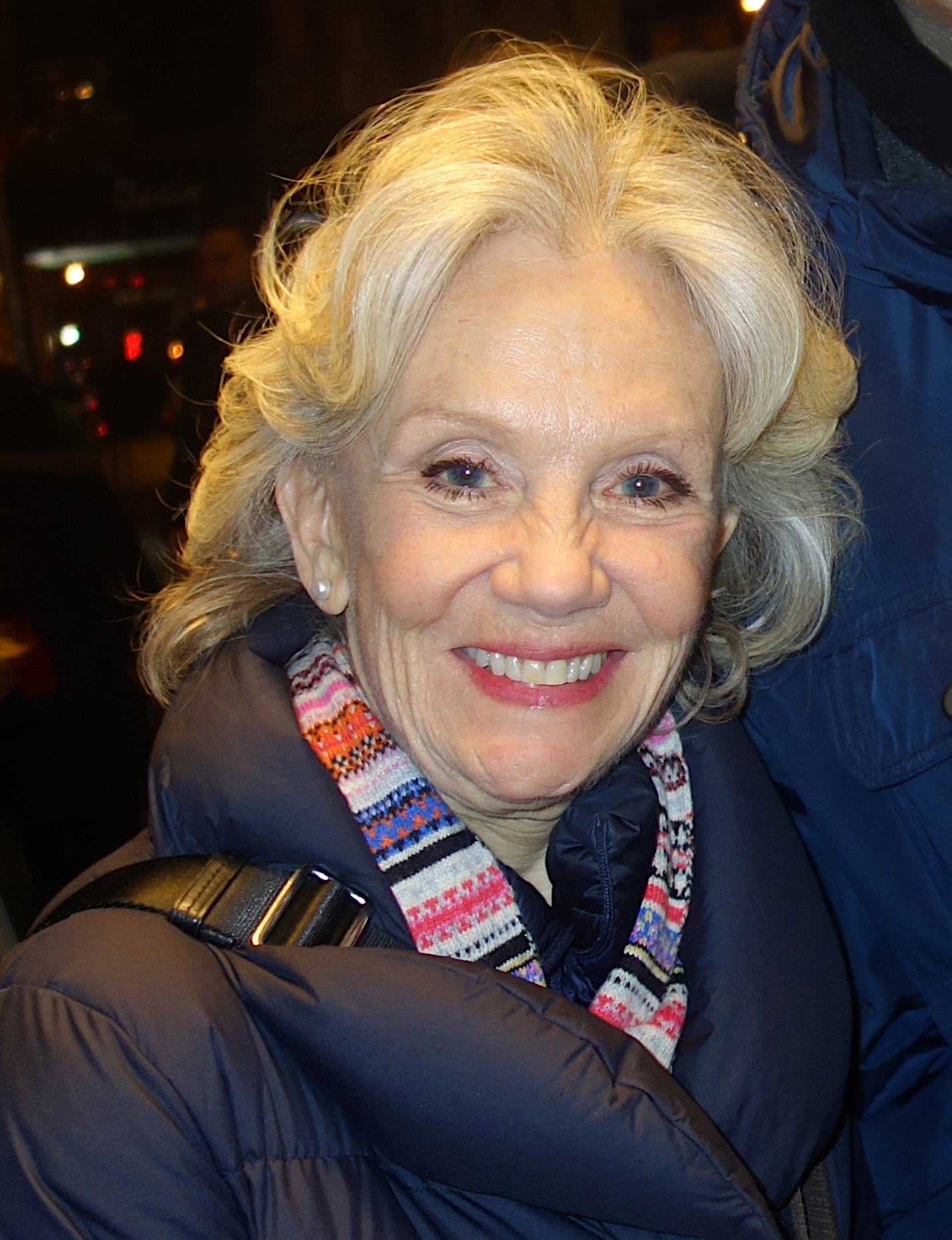
Hayley Mills; Academy Juvenile Award recipient

Nominees were announced on February 27, 1961. Winners are listed first and highlighted in boldface.

**Best Motion Picture**: **The Apartment – Billy Wilder, producer**; The Alamo – John Wayne, producer; Elmer Gantry – Bernard Smith, producer; Sons and Lovers – Jerry Wald, producer; The Sundowners – Fred Zinnemann, producer	**Best Directing**: **Billy Wilder – The Apartment**; Jules Dassin – Never on Sunday; Alfred Hitchcock – Psycho; Jack Cardiff – Sons and Lovers; Fred Zinnemann – The Sundowners
**Best Actor**: **Burt Lancaster – Elmer Gantry as Elmer Gantry**; Trevor Howard – Sons and Lovers as Walter Morel; Jack Lemmon – The Apartment as Calvin Clifford "Bud" Baxter; Laurence Olivier – The Entertainer as Archie Rice; Spencer Tracy – Inherit the Wind as Henry Drummond	**Best Actress**: **Elizabeth Taylor – BUtterfield 8 as Gloria Wandrous**; Greer Garson – Sunrise at Campobello as Eleanor Roosevelt; Deborah Kerr – The Sundowners as Ida Carmody; Shirley MacLaine – The Apartment as Fran Kubelik; Melina Mercouri – Never on Sunday as Ilya
**Best Actor in a Supporting Role**: **Peter Ustinov – Spartacus as Batiatus**; Peter Falk – Murder, Inc. as Abe "Kid Twist" Reles; Jack Kruschen – The Apartment as Dr. Dreyfuss; Sal Mineo – Exodus as Dov Landau; Chill Wills – The Alamo as Beekeeper	**Best Actress in a Supporting Role**: **Shirley Jones – Elmer Gantry as Lulu Bains**; Glynis Johns – The Sundowners as Mrs. Firth; Shirley Knight – The Dark at the Top of the Stairs as Reenie Flood; Janet Leigh – Psycho as Marion Crane; Mary Ure – Sons and Lovers as Clara Dawes
**Best Writing (Story and Screenplay -- Written Directly for the Screen)**: **The Apartment – Billy Wilder and I. A. L. Diamond**; The Angry Silence – Richard Gregson, Michael Craig and Bryan Forbes; The Facts of Life – Melvin Frank and Norman Panama; Hiroshima, My Love – Marguerite Duras; Never on Sunday – Jules Dassin	**Best Writing (Screenplay -- Based on Material from Another Medium)**: **Elmer Gantry – Richard Brooks based on the novel by Sinclair Lewis**; Inherit the Wind – Nedrick Young and Harold Jacob Smith based on the play by Jerome Lawrence and Robert E. Lee; Sons and Lovers – Gavin Lambert and T. E. B. Clarke based on the novel by D. H. Lawrence; The Sundowners – Isobel Lennart based on the novel by Jon Cleary; Tunes of Glory – James Kennaway based on his novel
**Best Foreign Language Film**: **The Virgin Spring (Sweden)**; Kapo (Italy); Macario (Mexico); The Ninth Circle (Yugoslavia); La Vérité (France)	**Best Documentary (Feature)**: **The Horse with the Flying Tail – Larry Lansburgh**; Rebel in Paradise – Robert D. Fraser
**Best Documentary (Short Subject)**: **Giuseppina – James Hill**; Beyond Silence – United States Information Agency; A City Called Copenhagen – Statens Filmcentral, The Danish Government Film Office; George Grosz' Interregnum – Charles Carey and Altina Carey; Universe – Colin Low	**Best Short Subject (Live Action)**: **Day of the Painter – Ezra R. Baker**; The Creation of Woman – Charles F. Schwep and Ismail Merchant; Islands of the Sea – Walt Disney; A Sport Is Born – Leslie Winik
**Best Short Subject (Cartoon)**: **Munro – William L. Snyder**; Goliath II – Walt Disney; High Note – Warner Bros.; Mouse and Garden – Warner Bros.; A Place in the Sun – František Vystrčil	**Best Music (Music Score of a Dramatic or Comedy Picture)**: **Exodus – Ernest Gold**; The Alamo – Dimitri Tiomkin; Elmer Gantry – André Previn; The Magnificent Seven – Elmer Bernstein; Spartacus – Alex North
**Best Music (Scoring of a Musical Picture)**: **Song Without End – Morris Stoloff and Harry Sukman**; Bells Are Ringing – André Previn; Can-Can – Nelson Riddle; Let's Make Love – Lionel Newman and Earle H. Hagen; Pepe – Johnny Green	**Best Music (Song)**: **"Never on Sunday" from Never on Sunday – Music and Lyrics by Manos Hatzidakis**; "The Second Time Around" from High Time – Music by Jimmy Van Heusen and Lyrics by Sammy Cahn; "Faraway Part of Town" from Pepe – Music by André Previn; Lyrics by Dory Previn; "The Green Leaves of Summer" from The Alamo – Music by Dimitri Tiomkin; Lyrics by Paul Francis Webster; "The Facts of Life" from The Facts of Life – Music and Lyrics by Johnny Mercer
**Best Sound**: **The Alamo – Gordon E. Sawyer and Fred Hynes**; The Apartment – Gordon E. Sawyer; Cimarron – Franklin Milton; Pepe – Charles Rice; Sunrise at Campobello – George Groves	**Best Art Direction (Black-and-White)**: **The Apartment – Art Direction: Alexandre Trauner; Set Decoration: Edward G. Boyle**; The Facts of Life – Art Direction: Joseph McMillan Johnson and Kenneth A. Reid; Set Decoration: Ross Dowd; Psycho – Art Direction: Joseph Hurley and Robert Clatworthy; Set Decoration: George Milo; Sons and Lovers – Art Direction: Thomas N. Morahan; Set Decoration: Lionel Couch; Visit to a Small Planet – Art Direction: Hal Pereira and Walter Tyler; Set Decoration: Samuel M. Comer and Arthur Krams
**Best Art Direction (Color)**: **Spartacus – Art Direction: Alexander Golitzen and Eric Orbom (posthumous award); Set Decoration: Russell A. Gausman and Julia Heron**; Cimarron – Art Direction: George Davis and Addison Hehr; Set Decoration: Henry Grace, Hugh Hunt and Otto Siegel; It Started in Naples – Art Direction: Hal Pereira and Roland Anderson; Set Decoration: Samuel M. Comer and Arrigo Breschi; Pepe – Art Direction: Ted Haworth; Set Decoration: William Kiernan; Sunrise at Campobello – Art Direction: Edward Carrere; Set Decoration: George James Hopkins	**Best Cinematography (Black-and-White)**: **Sons and Lovers – Freddie Francis**; The Apartment – Joseph LaShelle; The Facts of Life – Charles Lang; Inherit the Wind – Ernest Laszlo; Psycho – John L. Russell
**Best Cinematography (Color)**: **Spartacus – Russell Metty**; The Alamo – William H. Clothier; BUtterfield 8 – Joseph Ruttenberg and Charles Harten; Exodus – Sam Leavitt; Pepe – Joseph MacDonald	**Best Costume Design (Black-and-White)**: **The Facts of Life – Edith Head and Edward Stevenson**; Never on Sunday – Deni Vachlioti; The Rise and Fall of Legs Diamond – Howard Shoup; Seven Thieves – Bill Thomas; The Virgin Spring – Marik Vos
**Best Costume Design (Color)**: **Spartacus – Bill Thomas and Valles**; Can-Can – Irene Sharaff; Midnight Lace – Irene Lentz; Pepe – Edith Head; Sunrise at Campobello – Marjorie Best	**Best Film Editing**: **The Apartment – Daniel Mandell**; The Alamo – Stuart Gilmore; Inherit the Wind – Frederic Knudtson; Pepe – Viola Lawrence and Al Clark; Spartacus – Robert Lawrence
**Best Special Effects**: **The Time Machine – Gene Warren and Tim Baar**; The Last Voyage – Augie Lohman

=== Honorary Awards ===
- To Gary Cooper for his many memorable screen performances and the international recognition he, as an individual, has gained for the motion picture industry.
- To Stan Laurel for his creative pioneering in the field of cinema comedy.
- To Hayley Mills for Pollyanna, the most outstanding juvenile performance during 1960.

=== Jean Hersholt Humanitarian Award ===
- Sol Lesser

== Presenters and performers ==
=== Presenters ===
- Steve Allen and Jayne Meadows (Presenters: Best Song)
- Polly Bergen and Richard Widmark (Presenters: Best Special Effects)
- Yul Brynner (Presenter: Best Actress)
- Kitty Carlisle and Moss Hart (Presenters: Writing Awards)
- Cyd Charisse and Tony Martin (Presenters: Cinematography Awards)
- Betty Comden and Adolph Green (Presenters: Best Film Editing)
- Wendell Corey and Susan Strasberg (Presenters: Short Subjects Awards)
- Tony Curtis and Janet Leigh (Presenters: Documentary Awards)
- Bobby Darin and Sandra Dee (Presenters: Music Awards)
- Greer Garson (Presenter: Best Actor)
- Hugh Griffith (Presenter: Best Supporting Actress)
- Audrey Hepburn (Presenter: Best Motion Picture)
- Jim Hutton and Paula Prentiss (Presenters: Best Sound)
- Eric Johnston (Presenter: Best Foreign Language Film)
- Danny Kaye (Presenter: Honorary Award to Stan Laurel)
- Gina Lollobrigida (Presenter: Best Director)
- Tina Louise and Tony Randall (Presenters: Art Direction Awards)
- Barbara Rush and Robert Stack (Presenters: Costume Design Awards)
- Eva Marie Saint (Presenter: Best Supporting Actor)
- Shirley Temple (Presenter: Juvenile Award to Hayley Mills)
- William Wyler (Presenter: Honorary Award to Gary Cooper)

=== Performers ===
- The Brothers Four ("The Green Leaves of Summer" from The Alamo)
- Connie Francis ("Never on Sunday" from Never on Sunday)
- The Hi-Lo's ("The Facts of Life" from The Facts of Life)
- Jane Morgan ("The Second Time Around" from High Time)
- Sarah Vaughan ("The Faraway Part of Town" from Pepe)

== Multiple nominations and awards ==
Films with multiple nominations
Nominations	Film
10	The Apartment
7	The Alamo
7	Pepe
7	Sons and Lovers
6	Spartacus
5	Elmer Gantry
5	The Facts of Life
5	Never on Sunday
5	The Sundowners
4	Inherit the Wind
4	Psycho
4	Sunrise at Campobello
3	Exodus
2	BUtterfield 8
2	Can-Can
2	Cimarron
2	The Virgin Spring

Films with multiple awards
Awards	Film
5	The Apartment
4	Spartacus
3	Elmer Gantry

== See also ==
- 18th Golden Globe Awards
- 1960 in film
- 3rd Grammy Awards
- 12th Primetime Emmy Awards
- 13th Primetime Emmy Awards
- 14th British Academy Film Awards
- 15th Tony Awards
