= List of Eva Marie Saint performances =

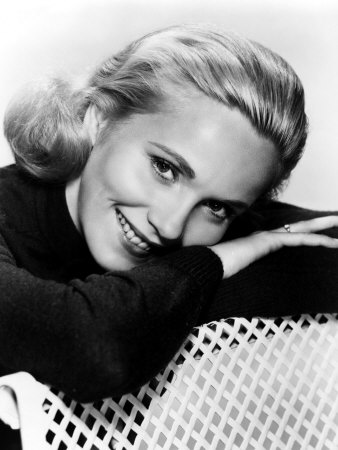
Eva Marie Saint in the 1950s

Eva Marie Saint (1924 – 2026) was an American actress with a career spanning more than seven decades. At the time of her death, Saint was the earliest surviving and oldest living Academy Award winner and one of the last surviving stars from the Golden Age of Hollywood.

Saint played the role of Thelma in Horton Foote's The Trip to Bountiful (1953) and made her film debut in Elia Kazan's On the Waterfront (1954). She later appeared in Raintree County (1957), A Hatful of Rain (1957), North by Northwest (1959), Exodus (1960), The Sandpiper, 36 Hours, The Russians Are Coming the Russians Are Coming, and Grand Prix (1966).

From the 1970s onward, she worked primarily in television and on stage. Her final theatrical film appearance was in Winter's Tale (2014).

== Film ==
Year	Title	Role	Notes
1954	On the Waterfront	Edie Doyle	
1956	That Certain Feeling	Dunreath Henry	
1957	A Hatful of Rain	Celia Pope	
1957	Raintree County	Nell Gaither	
1959	North by Northwest	Eve Kendall	
1960	Exodus	Kitty Fremont	
1962	All Fall Down	Echo O'Brien	
1964	36 Hours	Anna Hedler	
1965	The Sandpiper	Claire Hewitt	
1966	The Russians Are Coming the Russians Are Coming	Elspeth Whittaker	
1966	Grand Prix	Louise Frederickson	
1968	The Stalking Moon	Sarah Carver	
1970	Loving	Selma Wilson	
1972	Cancel My Reservation	Sheila Bartlett	
1986	Nothing in Common	Lorraine Basner	
2000	I Dreamed of Africa	Franca	
2005	Don't Come Knocking	Howard's mother	
2005	Because of Winn-Dixie	Miss Franny	
2006	Superman Returns	Martha Kent	
2014	Winter's Tale	Adult Willa	
2019	Mariette in Ecstasy	Mother Saint-Raphael	Completed in 1996; final film role

== Television ==
Year	Title	Role	Notes
1946	Campus Hoopla	Commercial spokeswoman	
1949	Suspense	Francie	Episode: "The Comic Strip Murder"
1949	Studio One	Edna Baker	Episode: "June Moon"
1950–52	One Man's Family	Claudia Barbour Roberts	
1950	Prudential Family Playhouse	Edith Cortwright, Mabel	2 episodes
1953	Plymouth Playhouse	Cousin Lizz	Episode: "Jamie"
1953	Martin Kane, Private Eye	Sheila Dixon	Episode: "Trip to Bermuda"
1953	Goodyear Television Playhouse	Frances Barclay	Episode: "Wish on the Moon"
1954	Pond's Theater	Tina	Episode: "The Old Maid"
1954	The Philco Television Playhouse	Dorie Wilson, Betty	2 episodes
1954	GE True Theater	Maudle Applegate	Episode: "The Rider on the Pale Horse"
1955	Producers' Showcase	Miss Blake, Emily Webb	2 episodes
1964	Bob Hope Presents the Chrysler Theatre	Diane Wescott	Episode: "Her School for Bachelors"
1977	How the West Was Won	Kate Macahan	4 episodes
1983	The Love Boat	Aunt Helena Georgelos	2 episodes
1986–88	Moonlighting	Virginia Hayes	6 episodes
1999	Frasier	Joanna Doyle	Episode: "Our Parents, Ourselves"
2012–14	The Legend of Korra	Katara (voice)	6 episodes

== TV films and miniseries ==
Year	Title	Role	Notes
1947	A Christmas Carol		
1953	The Trip to Bountiful	Thelma	
1964	Carol for Another Christmas	WAVE Lt. Gibson	
1976	The Macahans	Kate Macahan	
1978	Taxi!!!	The Passenger	
1978	A Christmas to Remember	Emma Larson	
1979	When Hell Was in Session	Jane Denton	
1980	The Curse of King Tut's Tomb	Sarah Morrissey	
1981	The Best Little Girl in the World	Joanne Powell	
1981	Splendor in the Grass	Mrs. Loomis	
1983	Malibu	Mary Wharton	
1983	Jane Doe	Dr. Addie Coleman	
1984	Fatal Vision	Mildred Kassab	
1984	Love Leads the Way: A True Story	Mrs. Eustes	
1986	The Last Days of Patton	Beatrice Ayer Patton	
1986	A Year in the Life	Ruth Gardner	
1987	Breaking Home Ties	Emma	
1988	I'll Be Home for Christmas	Martha Bundy	
1990	Voyage of Terror: The Achille Lauro Affair	Marilyn Klinghoffer	
1990	People Like Us	Lil Van Degan Altemus	
1991	Danielle Steel's 'Palomino'	Caroline Lord	
1993	Kiss of a Killer	Mrs. Wilson	
1995	My Antonia	Emmaline Burden	
1996	After Jimmy	Liz	
1996	Titanic	Hazel Foley	
1997	Time to Say Goodbye?	Ruth Klooster	
1999	Jackie’s Back!	Herself	
2000	Papa's Angels	Dori "Grammy" Jenkins	
2003	Open House	Veronica Reynolds	

== Stage ==
Year	Title	Role	Notes
1953	The Trip to Bountiful	Thelma	1954 Outer Circle Critics Special Award, Theatre World Award
1955	The Rainmaker	Lizzie Curry	
1971	Winesburg, Ohio	Mrs Willard	
1972	The Lincoln Mask	Mary Todd	
1973	Summer and Smoke	Alma Winemiller	
1974	Desire Under the Elms	Abbie Putnam	
1976–77	The Fatal Weakness	Mrs. Espenshade	
1977	Candida	Candida Morell	
1978–79	First Monday in October	Judge Ruth Loomis	
1982–83	Duet for One	Stephanie Abrahams	
1986	The Country Girl	Georgie Elgin	
1994	Death of a Salesman	Linda Loman	
2001	Love Letters	Melissa Gardner	
2005	Touch The Names	Eva Marie Saint	
