= Ken Reid =

Ken or Kenneth Reid may refer to:

- Ken Reid (comics) (1919–1987), British cartoonist
- Ken Reid (journalist) (1955–2024), Northern Irish journalist
- Ken Reid (comedian) (born 1980), American stand-up comedian
- Kenneth Reid (legal scholar), professor of Scottish law at University of Edinburgh
- Kenneth A. Reid (1919–1996), American art director

== See also ==
- Ken Reed (disambiguation)
- Ken Read (disambiguation)
