= Beyond Silence =

Beyond Silence can refer to:

- Beyond Silence (1960 film), a 1960 documentary film
- Beyond Silence (1996 film), a 1996 German film
