= 1961 Academy Awards =

1961 Academy Awards may refer to:

- 33rd Academy Awards, the Academy Awards ceremony that took place in 1961
- 34th Academy Awards, the 1962 ceremony honoring the best in film for 1961
