= Ken Read (disambiguation) =

Ken Read (born 1955) is a Canadian alpine skier

Ken or Kenneth Read may also refer to:

- Ken Read (sailor) (born 1961), American yachtsman
- Ken Read (footballer) (1911–1999), Australian rules footballer

== See also ==
- Ken Reid (disambiguation)
- Ken Reed (disambiguation)
