= Elizabeth Frank =

American writer and academic

- Born: September 14, 1945 (age 81); Los Angeles, California
- Title: Joseph E. Harry Professor of Modern Languages and Literature
- Parent: Melvin Frank
- Awards: Pulitzer Prize for Biography or Autobiography

Academic background
- Education: University of California, Berkeley

Academic work
- Discipline: Literature
- Institutions: Bard College
- Main interests: Biography
- Notable works: Louise Bogan: A Portrait

Elizabeth Frank (born September 14, 1945) is an American novelist, biographer, art critic and translator. She has been a member of the literature faculty of Bard College since 1982 and is the Joseph E. Harry Professor of Modern Languages and Literature at Bard College. In 1986 she won the Pulitzer Prize for Biography or Autobiography for Louise Bogan: A Portrait (Knopf, 1985). Frank is also the author of Jackson Pollock (Abbeville Press, 1983) and the novel Cheat and Charmer (Random House 2004), as well as the monographs Esteban Vicente (Hudson Hills, 1995) and Karen Gunderson: The Dark World of Light (Abbeville, 2016). Her short story “Fires” is included in the anthology It Occurs to Me That I Am America (Atria Books, 2018). Along with co-translator Deliana Simeonova, she published translations from the Bulgarian of two novels about Jews in the twentieth century by Bulgarian novelist and screenwriter Angel Wagenstein: Farewell, Shanghai and Isaac’s Torah (Other Press, both 2008).

She is the recipient of fellowships from the National Endowment for the Humanities, the Ford Foundation, Temple University, the Newberry Library, and the American Council of Learned Societies.

Frank has also written numerous articles on literature and art in such publications as the New York Times Book Review, New York Times Magazine, The Nation, Art in America, Partisan Review, Salmagundi, and ARTnews. She has published short stories, in translation by Bulgarian author Zdravka Evtimova, in the Bulgarian journal, Suvremenik.

She attended the International School of Geneva and Bennington College, and earned her earned B.A., M.A., and Ph.D. degrees from the University of California, Berkeley.

Her father was Academy Award-nominated writer-producer-director Melvin Frank.
