= Ken Reed =

Ken or Kenneth Reed may refer to:

- Ken Reed (Australian politician) (born 1944), Australian former politician
- Ken Reed (Canadian football) (1941–2014), linebacker
- Ken Reed (footballer) (1931–2018), Australian rules footballer
- Ken Reed (West Virginia politician), member of the West Virginia House of Delegates

== See also ==
- Ken Reid (disambiguation)
- Ken Read (disambiguation)
