= Louise Bogan =

American poet (1897–1970)

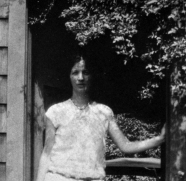
- Born: August 11, 1897 Livermore Falls, Maine, U.S.
- Died: February 4, 1970 (aged 72) New York City, U.S.
- Occupation: Poet; critic
- Education: Boston University

Louise Bogan (11 August 1897 – 4 February 1970) was an American poet. She was appointed the fourth Consultant in Poetry to the Library of Congress in 1945, a role today known as U.S. Poet Laureate, becoming the first woman to hold this title. Throughout her life she wrote poetry, fiction, and criticism, and became the regular poetry reviewer for The New Yorker.

Samuel Barber put her poem "To Be Sung On The Water" to music in 1968 and requested that it be played at his burial in 1981. Dictionary of Literary Biography contributor Brett C. Millier described her as "one of the finest lyric poets America has produced." He said, "the fact that she was a woman and that she defended formal, lyric poetry in an age of expansive experimentation made evaluation of her work, until quite recently, somewhat condescending."

== Early life ==
Bogan was born in Livermore Falls, Maine. With the help of a female benefactor, Bogan attended Girls' Latin School for five years, where she began writing poetry and reading the first issues of Poetry: A Magazine of Verse. Her education eventually gave her the opportunity to attend Boston University. In 1916 she left the university after completing her freshman year.

Bogan moved to New York to pursue a career in writing, and her only daughter, Maidie Alexander, was left in the care of Bogan's parents. In 1920 she left and spent a few years in Vienna, where she explored her loneliness and her new identity in verse. She returned to New York City and published her first book of poetry, Body of This Death: Poems. Four years later, she published her second book of poetry, Dark Summer: Poems, and shortly after was hired as a poetry editor for The New Yorker. It was during this time frame that Bogan came to be in contact with influential writers of the time like William Carlos Williams, Edmund Wilson, Marianne Moore, John Reed, Lola Ridge, and Malcolm Cowley.

== Career ==
Bogan is the author of six poetry collections, including Body of This Death (1923), Collected Poems: 1923–1953 (1954), and The Blue Estuaries: Poems, 1923–1968 (1968). She is also the author of several books of prose and translations. Bogan's awards include two fellowships from the Guggenheim Foundation, the 1955 Bollingen Prize from Yale University, and monetary awards from the Academy of American Poets and the National Endowment for the Arts. In 1945, she was appointed the Consultant in Poetry to the Library of Congress. She was a visiting professor at the University of Washington, Seattle; the University of Chicago; the University of Arkansas; and Brandeis University.

Not only was it difficult being a female poet in the 1930s and 1940s, but her lower-middle-class Irish background and limited education also brought on much ambivalence and contradiction for Louise Bogan. She even refused to review women poets in her early career and stated in a letter: "I have found from bitter experience that one woman poet is at a disadvantage in reviewing another, if the review be not laudatory."

Bogan published her first volume of poems, Body of This Death, in 1923. Her second volume, Dark Summer, appeared six years later in 1929. She also translated works by Ernst Jünger, Goethe, and Jules Renard. Later in Bogan's life, a volume of her collected works, The Blue Estuaries: Poems 1923–1968, was published with such poems as "The Dream" and "Women."

Her poetry was published in The New Republic, The Nation, Poetry: A Magazine of Verse, Scribner's, The New Yorker and Atlantic Monthly. Her Collected Poems: 1923–1953 won her the Bollingen award in 1955 as well as an award from the Academy of American Poets in 1959. She was the poetry reviewer of The New Yorker from 1931 until she retired in 1970, shortly before her death, stating: "No more pronouncements on lousy verse. No more hidden competition. No more struggling not to be a square."

She was a strong supporter, as well as a friend, of the poet Theodore Roethke. In a letter to Edmund Wilson, she detailed a raucous affair that she and the yet-unpublished Roethke carried on in 1935, during the time between his expulsion from Lafayette College and his return to Michigan. At the time she seemed little impressed by what she called his "very, very small lyrics"; she seems to have viewed the affair as, at most, a possible source for her own work.

Towards the end of her life, in December 1968, composer Samuel Barber put to music her poem "To Be Sung On The Water" (Op. 42, No. 2). It had first appeared in the bottom right corner of a recto page of The New Yorker in 1937, It was eventually collected in 1954 and 1968 in her two main poetry collections, Collected Poems and The Blue Estuaries. On 18 November 1968, following the publication of the latter, Bogan was at the Coolidge Auditorium at the Library of Congress to discuss her poetry alongside that of J. V. Cunningham. That evening, she read among other poems "To Be Sung On The Water".

== Posthumous reception ==
A number of autobiographical pieces were published posthumously in Journey around My Room (1980). Elizabeth Frank's biography of Louise Bogan, Louise Bogan: A Portrait, won a Pulitzer Prize in 1986. Ruth Anderson's sound poem I Come Out of Your Sleep (revised and recorded on Sinopah 1997 XI) is constructed from speech sounds in Bogan's poem "Little Lobelia."

A quote from a letter that Bogan wrote to fellow poet John Hall Wheelock is heavily anthologized:

"I cannot believe that the inscrutable universe turns on an axis of suffering; surely the strange beauty of the world must somewhere rest on pure joy!"

== Interpretations ==
=== Medusa ===
Though open to interpretation, "Medusa" is a poem that revolves around the petrification of the speaker who contemplates the concept of time. In the poem, after the speaker bears witness to the apparition of the Gorgon Medusa, the speaker ponders on how nature and life will continue, as "the water will always fall, and will not fall" and "the grass will always be growing for hay" while "I shall stand here like a shadow" and "nothing will ever stir". While many interpretations of the poem exist, one possible explanation for the bleakness of this poem may revolve around Bogan's depression and solitude after divorcing from her first husband and living in poverty with a daughter in hand. The idea that one would become petrified and lost in time by Medusa is similar to a feeling of loss and despair as one feels helpless and stuck in a situation one feels is unchangeable. Brett C. Millier, a Professor of Literature at Middlebury College, describes Bogan's poetry as one where "Betrayal, particularly sexual betrayal, is a constant theme." At a time where she most likely felt betrayed by her husband and society, Bogan feels like the speaker in "Medusa", stuck in a dead scene where her eyes could no longer drift away to a better life.

== Bibliography ==
=== Poetry ===
Collections

- Bogan, Louise. Poems and new poems. Scribner.

=== Critical studies and reviews of Bogan's work ===
- Ridgeway, Jaqueline (1977), "The necessity of form to the poetry of Louise Bogan", Women's Studies: An inter-disciplinary journal, vol. 5, no. 2, pp. 137–149, doi:10.1080/00497878.1977.9978440
- Kinzie, Mary (March–April 2005), "Louise Bogan in Her Prose", The American Poetry Review, 34 (2): 15–23, JSTOR 20682825

=== Primary sources ===
- Louise Bogan Papers at the Amherst College Archives & Special Collections
- Louise Bogan Papers, 1936-1954 at Princeton University Library
- Louise Bogan Collection, 1934–1985 at the University of New England
- Louise Bogan Papers at Washington University in St. Louis Libraries
- "Louise Bogan and J.V. Cunningham reading and discussing their poems" (audio), Library of Congress, Coolidge Auditorium, 18 November 1968
