= The Facts of Life (film) =

1960 film by Norman Panama, Melvin Frank

- Directed by: Melvin Frank
- Written by: Norman Panama; Melvin Frank
- Produced by: Norman Panama
- Starring: Bob Hope; Lucille Ball
- Cinematography: Charles Lang
- Edited by: Frank Bracht
- Music by: Leigh Harline; Johnny Mercer
- Distributed by: United Artists
- Release date: November 14, 1960
- Running time: 103 minutes
- Language: English
- Box office: $3.2 million

The Facts of Life is a 1960 romantic comedy starring Bob Hope and Lucille Ball as married people who have an affair. Written, directed and produced by longtime Hope associates Melvin Frank and Norman Panama, the film is more serious than many other contemporary Hope vehicles. The film features an opening animated title sequence created by Saul Bass.

The film was nominated for five Academy Awards, winning one for Best Costume Design (for Edith Head and Edward Stevenson). Lucille Ball was nominated for a Golden Globe for Best Actress – Comedy.

== Plot ==
As the yearly vacation of six neighbors, the Gilberts, Masons and Weavers, approaches, Kitty Weaver and Larry Gilbert find themselves frustrated with the predictable routine of their lives. When their spouses are kept away from the vacation and the Masons are bedridden with illness, Kitty and Larry find themselves alone in Acapulco. Spending time together, Kitty and Larry fall in love. However, when the vacation is over, they find it difficult to continue the romance. They cannot bear seeing each other at their usual social activities without being together. They try a visit to a local drive-in movie, but they are recognized and beat a hasty retreat, followed by a visit to a motel which also goes awry. They arrange a weekend together in Monterey when Larry will be there on business and Kitty's husband is away with their children, and a guilty-feeling Kitty leaves behind a note for her husband Jack telling him she is leaving him and wants a divorce. A heavy rainstorm causes problems with Larry and Kitty's hired car, and also with their cabin in the mountains which has a leaky roof. These cause tensions between them and bring a gradual realization that leaving their families involves many complications, including deciding that what they are doing is "wrong". The result is a race back home for Kitty to retrieve her breakup note before her husband reads it, but when she arrives he is already there. Jack tells her he has not yet read her note, and she asks him to burn it, which he does, but it has become clear that he had read it and has chosen to ignore it.

== Cast ==
- Bob Hope as Larry Gilbert
- Lucille Ball as Kitty Weaver
- Ruth Hussey as Mary Gilbert
- Don DeFore as Jack Weaver
- Louis Nye as Hamilton Busbee
- Philip Ober as Doc Mason
- Marianne Stewart as Connie Mason
- Hollis Irving as Myrtle Busbee

== Reception ==
In a positive contemporary review in The New York Times, critic Bosley Crowther called the script "... a wonderfully good-humored estimation of an essentially pathetic state of affairs" and wrote: "It is a grandly good-natured picture, full of thoroughly sparkling repartee and word-gags and sight-gags that crackle with humor and sly intelligence."

In 1964, Stanley Kauffmann of The New Republic wrote that the film "... was probably Bob Hope's best picture."

== Awards and nominations ==
Award	Category	Nominee(s)	Result
Academy Awards	Best Story and Screenplay – Written Directly for the Screen	Melvin Frank and Norman Panama	Nominated
Academy Awards	Best Art Direction – Black-and-White	Art Direction: Joseph McMillan Johnson and Kenneth A. Reid; Set Decoration: Ross Dowd	Nominated
Academy Awards	Best Cinematography – Black-and-White	Charles Lang	Nominated
Academy Awards	Best Costume Design – Black-and-White	Edith Head and Edward Stevenson	Won
Academy Awards	Best Song	"The Facts of Life"; Music and Lyrics by Johnny Mercer	Nominated
Golden Globe Awards	Best Motion Picture – Comedy		Nominated
Golden Globe Awards	Best Actor in a Motion Picture – Musical or Comedy	Bob Hope	Nominated
Golden Globe Awards	Best Actress in a Motion Picture – Musical or Comedy	Lucille Ball	Nominated
Laurel Awards	Top Action Drama		Nominated
Laurel Awards	Top Male Comedy Performance	Bob Hope	Nominated
Laurel Awards	Top Female Comedy Performance	Lucille Ball	Nominated
Writers Guild of America Awards	Best Written American Comedy	Melvin Frank and Norman Panama	Nominated
