= That Certain Feeling (film) =

1956 film by Melvin Frank

- Directed by: Norman Panama; Melvin Frank
- Screenplay by: Norman Panama; Melvin Fank; I. A. L. Diamond; William Altman
- Based on: King of Hearts (play) by Jean Kerr and Eleanor Brooke
- Starring: Bob Hope; Eva Marie Saint; George Sanders; Pearl Bailey
- Cinematography: Loyal Griggs
- Edited by: Tom McAdoo
- Music by: Joseph J. Lilley
- Production company: Hope Enterprises
- Distributed by: Paramount Pictures
- Release date: July 4, 1956
- Running time: 103 minutes
- Country: United States
- Language: English

That Certain Feeling is a 1956 American comedy film directed by Norman Panama and Melvin Frank, and starring Bob Hope, Eva Marie Saint and George Sanders. The cast also features Pearl Bailey and a young Jerry Mathers.

Based on the Broadway play King of Hearts by Jean Kerr, the film includes a song of the same name with music by George Gershwin and lyrics by Ira Gershwin, written in 1925. Bailey was one of many singers who made a recording of it.

== Plot ==
A New York woman who goes by the name Dunreath Henry (Eva Marie Saint) is the private secretary to the wealthy and popular cartoonist Larry Larkin (George Sanders), and is also his fiancée.

But back in Port Huron, Michigan when she was a girl, she was Ethel Jankowski. And she used to be married to another cartoonist, Francis X. Dignan (Bob Hope), who was once an associate of Al Capp.

One day, when Larkin's syndicate complains that his boy-and-dog comic strip "Snips and Runty" hasn't been as funny as it used to be, Dunreath hatches a scheme. Larry is leaving on a business trip and she is busy planning their honeymoon, so why not hire Dignan to ghost-write the strip?

Dignan doesn't want to do it and certainly can't stand the snooty Larkin, but he needs the money for his psychiatrist, who is trying to find out why any setback or stress leads to Dignan experiencing a bad case of nausea.

A lot of interesting developments take place in Larkin's Manhattan penthouse while the cartoonist is away. Dignan's strips are humorous and a hit. Old feelings begin to stir in Dunreath, having him around. Larkin's housekeeper, Gussie, begins to play matchmaker.

A young orphan, Norman, arrives one day because Larkin intends to adopt him. Dignan is impressed until he discovers that Larkin's interested only in the publicity, not in the child. The TV program Person to Person is coming to do a live interview, so Larkin wants a cute boy and happy puppy there by his side, just like his cartoon figures Snips and Runty.

Dignan is offended. He is supposed to find a small dog for Larkin, but instead brings home one called Happy, a gigantic hound. Dignan also draws a cartoon using Larkin's name portraying Snips as a juvenile delinquent. And if that weren't enough, Larkin comes home to find Dignan and Dunreath dressed in matching pajamas, each having drunk one too many martini.

Larkin fires Dignan just before the live TV appearance, which Dignan proceeds to interrupt by declaring his love for Larkin's fiancée. Dunreath decides to dump her betrothed and her fancy new name and live happily ever after with Dignan, Norman and Happy.

== Cast ==
- Bob Hope as Francis X. Dignan
- Eva Marie Saint as Dunreath Henry
- George Sanders as Larry Larkin
- Pearl Bailey as Gussie
- David Lewis as Joe Wickes
- Al Capp as himself
- Jerry Mathers as Norman Taylor
- Herbert Rudley as Doctor
- Florenz Ames as Sen. Winston
- Emory Parnell as Senator

== See also ==
- List of American films of 1956
