= Melvin Frank =

American film director (1913–1988)

- Born: August 13, 1913; Chicago, Illinois, U.S.
- Died: October 13, 1988 (aged 75); Los Angeles, California, U.S.
- Education: University of Chicago (BA)
- Occupation(s): Screenwriter, film director, film producer
- Spouse(s): Anne Ray (m. 1944; div. 1983) Juliet (m. 1983)
- Children: 3; including Elizabeth

Melvin Frank (13 August 1913 – 13 October 1988) was an American screenwriter, film producer and film director. He is known for his partnership with Norman Panama and their work on films such as Mr. Blandings Builds His Dream House (1948), White Christmas (1954), and The Court Jester (1956). He also directed films such as Buona Sera, Mrs. Campbell (1968) and A Touch of Class (1973).

== Life and career ==
Born to a Jewish family, Frank met his future collaborator Norman Panama in 1933 when they were both at the University of Chicago. After graduating, they formed a partnership in 1935 which endured for four decades; first writing for Milton Berle before becoming writers for Bob Hope's radio show. In 1941, they sold their first script to Paramount Pictures, My Favorite Blonde (1942), which starred Hope.

They worked for Paramount for five years where, among others, they wrote Road to Utopia (1946), starring Hope and Bing Crosby, for which they received an Academy Award nomination for Best Original Screenplay. They moved to Columbia Pictures making It Had to Be You (1947) and The Return of October (1948) and also wrote Mr. Blandings Builds His Dream House (1948) for RKO.

In 1950, they signed a writing, producing and directing deal with Metro-Goldwyn-Mayer and made films together as co-writers, co-directors and co-producers. They started with The Reformer and the Redhead (1950) and also made Knock on Wood (1954) and The Court Jester (1956), both with Danny Kaye, with the former earning them another Academy Award nomination. They also co-wrote White Christmas (1954) with Norman Krasna. They wrote a Broadway play together in 1956, later adapted into Li'l Abner (1959), directed by Frank. They received another Academy Award nomination for The Facts of Life (1960) and also worked on The Road to Hong Kong (1962).

Frank went on to a successful solo career as a film director, most notably directing the acclaimed romantic comedy A Touch of Class (1973), starring George Segal and Glenda Jackson. The film was nominated for the Academy Award for Best Picture and Best Writing, Story and Screenplay Based on Factual Material or Material Not Previously Published or Produced (with Jack Rose) and Jackson won the Academy Award for Best Actress for her role. Subsequent films directed by Frank include The Duchess and the Dirtwater Fox (1976) and Lost and Found (1979).

Over the course of his career, Frank was nominated for five Academy Awards. In 1984, he received the Laurel Award for Screenwriting Achievement from the Writers Guild of America.

=== Death ===
Frank had open heart surgery on October 12, 1988, and died the following day.

=== Personal life ===
Frank's first wife was Anne Ray, younger sister of actress Jigee Viertel. At the time of his death he was still married to his second wife, Juliet. He had three children, Pulitzer Prize-winning writer Elizabeth Frank and sons Andrew and James.

== Selected filmography ==
Year	Title	Director	Writer	Producer
1942	My Favorite Blonde	No	Story	No
1946	Road to Utopia	No	Yes	No
1946	Monsieur Beaucaire	No	Yes	No
1947	It Had to Be You	No	Yes	No
1948	The Return of October	No	Yes	No
1948	Mr. Blandings Builds His Dream House	No	Yes	Yes
1950	The Reformer and the Redhead	Yes	Yes	Yes
1951	Strictly Dishonorable	Yes	Yes	Yes
1951	Callaway Went Thataway	Yes	Yes	Yes
1952	Above and Beyond	Yes	Yes	Yes
1954	White Christmas	No	Yes	No
1954	Knock on Wood	Yes	Yes	Yes
1956	The Court Jester	Yes	Yes	Yes
1956	That Certain Feeling	Yes	Yes	Yes
1959	Li'l Abner	Yes	Yes	No
1959	The Trap	No	Yes	Yes
1959	The Jayhawkers!	Yes	Yes	Yes
1960	The Facts of Life	Yes	Yes	No
1962	The Road to Hong Kong	No	Yes	Yes
1965	Strange Bedfellows	Yes	Yes	Yes
1966	Not with My Wife, You Don't!	No	Yes	No
1966	A Funny Thing Happened on the Way to the Forum	No	Yes	Yes
1968	Buona Sera, Mrs. Campbell	Yes	Yes	Yes
1973	A Touch of Class	Yes	Yes	Yes
1975	The Prisoner of Second Avenue	Yes	No	Yes
1976	The Duchess and the Dirtwater Fox	Yes	Yes	Yes
1979	Lost and Found	Yes	Yes	Yes
1987	Walk Like a Man	Yes	No	No
