= Ross Dowd =

American set decorator (1907–1965)

- Born: April 17, 1907
- Died: August 25, 1965 (aged 58); Los Angeles, California
- Occupation: Set decorator
- Years active: 1941-1966 (Last credit was after his death)

Ross Dowd (April 17, 1907 – August 25, 1965) was an American set decorator. He was nominated for two Academy Awards in the category Best Art Direction.

== Selected filmography ==
Dowd was nominated for two Academy Awards for Best Art Direction:

- The Facts of Life (1960)
- Around the World in 80 Days (1956)
