= It Started in Naples =

1960 film by Melville Shavelson

- Directed by: Melville Shavelson
- Written by: Michael Pertwee; Jack Davies (story)
- Screenplay by: Suso Cecchi d'Amico; Melville Shavelson; Jack Rose
- Produced by: Jack Rose
- Starring: Clark Gable; Sophia Loren; Vittorio De Sica
- Cinematography: Robert Surtees
- Edited by: Frank Bracht
- Music by: Alessandro Cicognini; Carlo Savina
- Distributed by: Paramount Pictures
- Release date: August 7, 1960
- Running time: 100 minutes
- Country: United States
- Language: English
- Box office: $2.3 million (US/ Canada Rentals)

It Started in Naples is a 1960 American romantic comedy film directed by Melville Shavelson and produced by Jack Rose from a screenplay by Suso Cecchi d'Amico, based on the story by Michael Pertwee and Jack Davies. The Technicolor cinematography was directed by Robert Surtees. The film stars Clark Gable, Sophia Loren, Vittorio De Sica and an Italian cast. This was Gable's final film to be released within his lifetime and his last film in color.

Hal Pereira, Roland Anderson, Samuel M. Comer and Arrigo Breschi were nominated for an Oscar for its art direction

The film was released by Paramount Pictures on August 7, 1960.

== Plot ==
Only a few days before his wedding, Michael Hamilton, a Philadelphia lawyer, travels to Naples in southern Italy to settle the estate of his late brother, Joseph, with Italian lawyer Vitale. In the opening narration, he states that he "was here before with the 5th US Army" in World War II. In Naples, Michael discovers that his brother had a son, eight-year-old Nando, who is being cared for by his maternal aunt Lucia, a cabaret singer. Joseph never married Nando's mother but drowned with her in a boating accident. Joseph's actual wife, whom he had left in 1950, is alive in Philadelphia. Michael discovers to his dismay that his brother spent a fortune on fireworks. After seeing Nando handing out racy photos of Lucia at 2 a.m., Michael wants to enroll Nando in the American School at Rome, but Lucia wins custody of the boy. Despite the age difference, romance soon blossoms between Michael and Lucia, and he decides to stay in Italy.

== Cast ==
- Clark Gable as Michael Hamilton
- Sophia Loren as Lucia Curcio
- Vittorio De Sica as Mario Vitale
- Carlo Angeletti ("Marietto") as Nando Hamilton
- Paolo Carlini as Renzo
- Giovanni Filidoro as Gennariello
- Claudio Ermelli as Luigi
- Bob Cunningham as Don Mc Guire (train passenger)
- Marco Tulli
- Carlo Rizzo
- Yvonne Monlaur

== Production ==
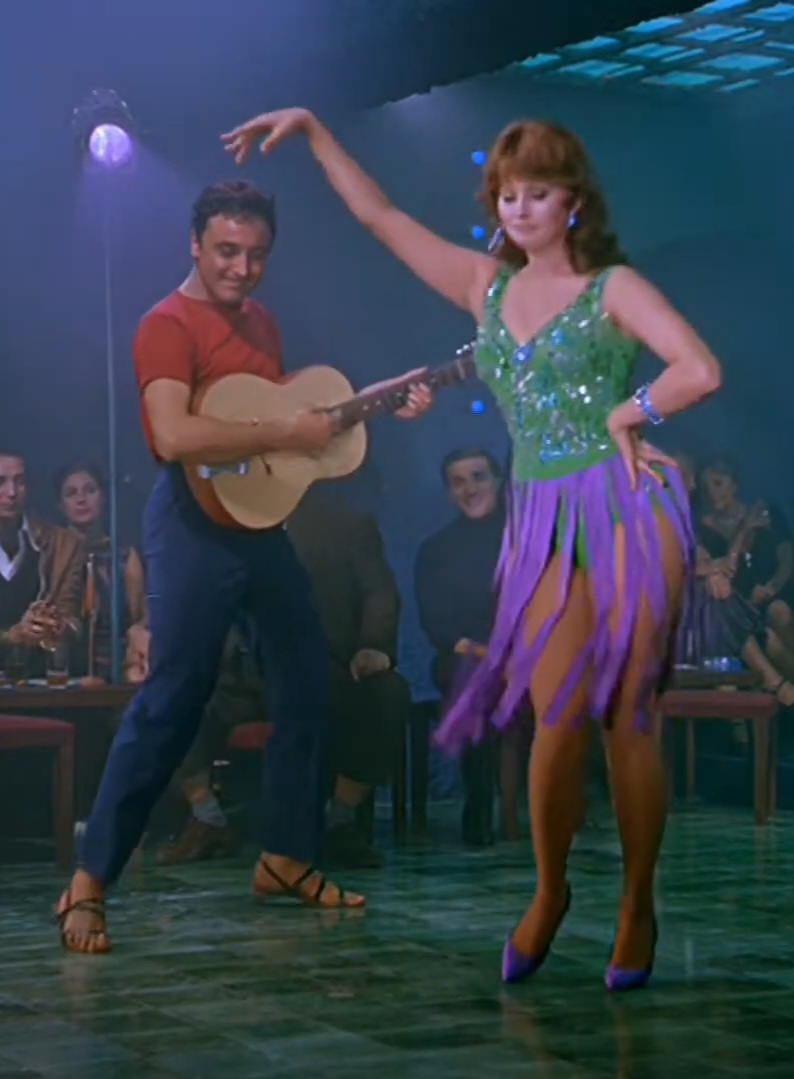
Loren in her "Tu vuò fà l'americano" performance

Loren performs a tongue-in-cheek musical number, "Tu vuò fà l'americano" ("You Want to Play American"), written by famed Neapolitan composer Renato Carosone.

Angeletti did not speak English and learned his lines phonetically, which he had also done in his previous film, in which he mouthed German lines without knowing how to speak German.

On the second day of filming of a courtroom scene, an actor portraying one of the judges seen in the first day's footage was unavailable because he had plans to take his family to the beach. The actor sent his brother in his place, who did not resemble him.

It was filmed on location in Rome, Naples and Capri.

== Reception ==
Writing in The New York Times, critic Bosley Crowther called the film a "featherweight, obvious romance" but praised Loren: "Among the scenic attractions ... is an eyeful named Sophia Loren. ... And the Bay of Naples, the Blue Grotto, the port of Capri and numerous vistas on the Mediterranean are scarcely as stunning as she.", and that even Clark Gable "lets himself be exposed throughout the picture as a sort of sourpuss in the shadow of the girl." Variety said that the script and Shavelson's direction "try too hard to make the film up-roariously funny and risque. When the wit flows naturally, it is a delight; when it strains, it pains." However, Gable and Loren are "a surprisingly effective and compatible comedy pair", and that above all, Loren offered "a vigorous and amusing performance". Conversely, film critic Leonard Maltin said that the star duo "never clicks as love match, but they do their best".

French newspaper Le Monde wrote that It Started in Naples, "even more than the world of comics, evokes that of the easy picturesque postcards in favor of foreign tourists. This film, imbued with a sentimentality of charming songs, is helmed by an American, Melville Shavelson, who has hired, no doubt for the purposes of the co-production, Sophia Loren and Clark Gable. Both lack conviction, and we cannot blame them. It is however not unpleasant to look at Sophia Loren who, in spite of some added grimaces, remained superb of casualness, of health. Clark Gable bears his role with despondency, and over his marked face passes a kind of weary tension, as if it already foreshadows the illness that would suddenly take him away." (The review was written in February 1961, three months after Gable's death the previous November.)

For the German Lexikon des internationalen Films ("Lexicon of International Films"), It Began in Naples is a "star comedy" that could come up with "many whimsical punchlines" and was "amiably entertaining". German film magazine Cinema thought it was "gorgeous how the fiery Loren is allowed to sing, dance and above all rant wildly to her heart's content", while saying that the romance portrayed between her and Clark Gable is convincing "but at most is on paper." German supplement Prisma said that the "thoroughbred woman Sophia Loren is in her element", and that in the film she is "as we know her and like to see her best."

== Home media ==
It was released to DVD in North America in 2005.

== See also ==
- List of American films of 1960
