= Ken Read (footballer) =

Australian rules footballer, born 1911

Personal information
- Full name: Kenneth Stanley Read
- Born: 28 September 1911; Ivanhoe, Victoria
- Died: 1 June 1999 (aged 87)
- Original team: Doncaster
- Height: 178 cm (5 ft 10 in)
- Weight: 75 kg (165 lb)

Playing career^{1}
Years	Club	Games (Goals)
1936	Fitzroy	4 (5)
- ^{1} Playing statistics correct to the end of 1936.

Kenneth Stanley Read (28 September 1911 – 1 June 1999) was an Australian rules footballer who played with Fitzroy in the Victorian Football League (VFL).

Read later served in the Australian Army during World War II.
