= Arrigo Breschi =

Italian set decorator

- Occupation: Set decorator
- Years active: 1950-1993

Arrigo Breschi was an Italian set decorator. He was nominated for an Academy Award in the category Best Art Direction for the film It Started in Naples (1960) which starred Clark Gable, Sophia Loren, and Vittorio De Sica.

== Selected filmography ==
- I, Hamlet (1952)
- It Started in Naples (1960)
