= Norman Panama =

American film director (1914–2003)

- Born: April 21, 1914; Chicago, Illinois
- Died: January 13, 2003 (aged 88); Los Angeles, California
- Occupations: Film director, screenwriter, film producer

Norman Kaye Panama (April 21, 1914 – January 13, 2003) was an American screenwriter, film producer and film director. He is known for his partnership with Melvin Frank and their work on films such as Mr. Blandings Builds His Dream House (1948), White Christmas (1954), and The Court Jester (1956). Without Frank, he directed films such as How to Commit Marriage (1969).

== Life and career ==
Panama met his future collaborator Melvin Frank in 1933 when they were both at the University of Chicago. After graduating, they formed a partnership in 1935 which endured for four decades; first writing for Milton Berle before becoming writers for Bob Hope's radio show and for Groucho Marx. In 1941, they sold their first script to Paramount Pictures, My Favorite Blonde (1942), which starred Hope.

They worked for Paramount for five years where, among others, they wrote Road to Utopia (1946), starring Hope and Bing Crosby, for which they received an Academy Award nomination for Best Original Screenplay. They moved to Columbia Pictures making It Had to Be You (1947) and The Return of October (1948) and also wrote Mr. Blandings Builds His Dream House (1948) for RKO.

In 1950, they signed a writing, producing and directing deal with Metro-Goldwyn-Mayer and made films together as co-writers, co-directors and co-producers. They started with The Reformer and the Redhead (1950) and also made Knock on Wood (1954) and The Court Jester (1956), both with Danny Kaye, with the former earning them another Academy Award nomination. They also co-wrote White Christmas (1954) with Norman Krasna. They wrote a Broadway play together in 1956, later adapted into Li'l Abner (1959), directed by Frank. They received another Academy Award nomination for The Facts of Life (1960) and also worked on The Road to Hong Kong (1962).

He won an Edgar Award for A Talent for Murder (1981), a play he co-wrote with Jerome Chodorov. Panama continued to write and direct through the 1980s. He died in 2003 in Los Angeles, California, aged 88, from complications of Parkinson's disease.

== Selected filmography ==
- My Favorite Blonde (with Melvin Frank, 1942, story only)
- Road to Utopia (with Melvin Frank, 1946)
- Monsieur Beaucaire (with Melvin Frank, 1946)
- It Had to Be You (with Melvin Frank, 1947)
- The Return of October (with Melvin Frank, 1948)
- Mr. Blandings Builds His Dream House (with Melvin Frank, 1948)
- The Reformer and the Redhead (with Melvin Frank, 1950, also co-director)
- Strictly Dishonorable (with Melvin Frank, 1951, also co-director)
- Callaway Went Thataway (with Melvin Frank, 1951, also co-director)
- Above and Beyond (with Melvin Frank, 1952, also co-director)
- White Christmas (with Melvin Frank and Norman Krasna, 1954)
- Knock on Wood (with Melvin Frank, 1954, also co-director)
- The Court Jester (with Melvin Frank, 1956, also co-director)
- That Certain Feeling (with Melvin Frank, 1956, also co-director)
- Li'l Abner (with Melvin Frank, 1959)
- The Trap (with Melvin Frank, 1959)
- The Jayhawkers! (with Melvin Frank, 1959)
- The Facts of Life (with Melvin Frank, 1960)
- The Road to Hong Kong (with Melvin Frank, 1962, also director)
- Strange Bedfellows (with Melvin Frank and Michael Pertwee, 1965)
- Not with My Wife, You Don't! (with Melvin Frank, Peter Barnes and Larry Gelbart, 1966, also director)
- The Maltese Bippy (1969, director only)
- How to Commit Marriage (1969, director only)
- Coffee, Tea or Me? (with Melvin Frank and Stanley Ralph Ross, 1973, TV, also director)
- I Will, I Will... for Now (with Albert E. Lewin, 1976, also director)
- Barnaby and Me (1978)
