= Rebel in Paradise (film) =

1960 film

- Directed by: Ralph Luce
- Written by: Robert Russell
- Produced by: Robert D. Fraser
- Narrated by: John Conte
- Production company: Studio Sixteen
- Release date: 1960
- Running time: 40 minutes
- Country: United States
- Language: English

Rebel in Paradise is a 1960 American documentary film on the artist Paul Gauguin produced by Robert D. Fraser, a San Francisco real estate developer. It was nominated for an Academy Award for Best Documentary Feature.

== See also ==
- List of American films of 1960
