= Otto Siegel =

American set decorator (1897–1962)

- Born: May 7, 1897
- Died: August 21, 1962 (aged 65); Los Angeles, California
- Occupation: Set decorator
- Years active: 1942-1962

Otto Siegel (May 7, 1897 – August 21, 1962) was an American set decorator. He was nominated for an Academy Award in the category Best Art Direction for the film Cimarron.

== Selected filmography ==
- Cimarron (1960)
