= Cimarron (1960 film) =

1960 film by Anthony Mann

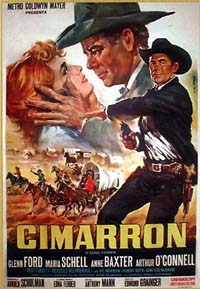
- Theatrical release poster
- Directed by: Anthony Mann (Note: During the middle of filming, Mann left the project and was replaced by Charles Walters who was uncredited.)
- Screenplay by: Arnold Schulman
- Based on: Cimarron; 1930 novel by Edna Ferber
- Produced by: Edmund Grainger
- Starring: Glenn Ford; Maria Schell; Anne Baxter; Harry Morgan
- Cinematography: Robert Surtees
- Edited by: John D. Dunning
- Music by: Franz Waxman
- Distributed by: Metro-Goldwyn-Mayer
- Release date: December 1, 1960 (premiere)
- Running time: 147 minutes
- Country: United States
- Language: English
- Budget: $5,421,000
- Box office: $4,825,000

Cimarron is a 1960 American epic Western film based on the 1930 Edna Ferber novel Cimarron. The film stars Glenn Ford and Maria Schell and was directed by Anthony Mann and Charles Walters, though Walters is not credited onscreen. Ferber's novel was previously adapted as a film in 1931; that version won three Academy Awards.

Cimarron was the first of three epics (along with El Cid and The Fall of the Roman Empire) that Mann directed. Despite high production costs and an experienced cast of Western veterans, stage actors and future stars, the film was released with little fanfare.

== Plot ==
Sabra Cravat joins her new husband, lawyer Yancey "Cimarron" Cravat, during the Oklahoma land rush of 1889. They encounter Yancey's old friend William "The Kid" Hardy and his buddies Wes Jennings and Hoss Barry. On the trail, Yancey helps Tom and Sarah Wyatt and their eight children, taking them aboard their wagons.

It seems to Sabra that her husband knows everyone in Oklahoma. A small crowd cheers Bob Yountis and his henchman Millis when they attack an Indian family. Yancey joins his friend Sam Pegler, editor of the Oklahoma Wigwam newspaper, in resisting Yountis.

Yountis warns Pegler against using the paper for his crusading as he had done in Texas. Sabra is angry that Yancey risked his life for an Indian but she helps the others, including peddler Sol Levy and printer Jesse Rickey, in righting the Indians' overturned wagon. Sam and his wife Mavis reveal more about Yancey's past as a cowboy, gambler, gunman and lawyer.

When 50,000 settlers race across the prairie to claim land, Tom falls and Sarah claims a dry, worthless patch. Pegler is trampled to death, and Dixie beats Yancey to the land that he wanted, so he asks Jesse to stay to help him run the paper.

In the new town of Osage, which consists of tents and half-built storefronts, Yountis and The Kid terrorize Levy in the street. Yancey tries but fails to persuade the Kid to change. One night, Yountis leads a lynch mob against the Indian family. Yancey arrives too late to stop it, but he kills Yountis and brings Arita and her baby Ruby home. Meanwhile, Sabra gives birth to a boy whom they name Cimarron, "Cim" for short.

Four years later, Osage is thriving. Tom has built an oil-drilling apparatus but he is a laughingstock. Wes, Hoss and The Kid, wanted outlaws, try to rob a train but are all killed soon after. When Yancey destroys the $1,000 reward check, Sabra is furious because he does not consider their son's financial security. They try to enroll Ruby in school but the school board won't let her attend. Yancey leaves to be part of the Cherokee Strip but Sabra refuses to join him. Yancey joins the Rough Riders and serves in the Spanish-American War. Years later, he returns and Sabra and Cim forgive him.

Tom finally strikes oil but Yancey is disgusted to learn that Tom bought the rights to oil found on Indian land. However, Yancey's campaign to win the Indians justice is a huge success, and he is invited to become governor of the Oklahoma Territory. Sabra is disappointed to discover that Cim and Ruby have grown close.

In Washington, D.C., Yancey finds Tom with a group of influential men and learns that the price of his appointment is his integrity. When Yancey tells Sabra that he can't be governor, she sends him away forever.

Cim and Ruby marry without warning and set off for Oregon but Sabra tells her son that he is throwing his life away.

Ten years later, on the occasion of the Oklahoma Wigwam's 25th anniversary, the United States' entry into World War I is announced. Later, Sabra hears that Yancey has been killed in the war.

== Cast ==
- Glenn Ford as Yancey Cravat
- Maria Schell as Sabra Cravat
- Anne Baxter as Dixie Lee
- Arthur O'Connell as Tom Wyatt
- Russ Tamblyn as William Hardy / The Cherokee Kid
- Mercedes McCambridge as Sarah Wyatt
- Vic Morrow as Wes Jennings
- Robert Keith as Sam Pegler
- Charles McGraw as Bob Yountis
- Aline MacMahon as Mavis Pegler
- Harry Morgan as Jesse Rickey (Credited as Henry "Harry" Morgan)
- David Opatoshu as Sol Levy
- Edgar Buchanan as Judge Neal Hefner
- Lili Darvas as Felicia Venable
- Mary Wickes as Mrs. Neal Hefner
- Royal Dano as Ike Howes
- L. Q. Jones as Millis
- George Brenlin as Hoss Barry
- Vladimir Sokoloff as Jacob Krubeckoff
- Eugene Jackson as Isaiah

Uncredited

- Andy Albin as Water Man
- Rayford Barnes as Cavalry Sergeant Who Breaks Up Fight
- Herman Belmonte as Dancer At Ball
- Mary Benoit as Mrs. Lancey
- Barry Bernard as Butler
- Jimmie Booth as Wagon Driver
- Danny Borzage as Townsman
- Chet Brandenburg as Townsman
- Janet Brandt as Madam Rhoda
- Paul Bryar as Mr. Self, Politician
- Robert Carson as Senator Rollins
- John L. Cason as Suggs
- William Challee as The Barber
- Mickie Chouteau as Ruby Red Feather
- Fred Coby as Oil Worker
- Gene Coogan as Butler / Townsman
- Jack Daly as Wyatt's Man
- John Damler as Foreman
- Richard Davies as Mr. Hodges
- George DeNormand as Townsman At Celebration
- James Dime as Townsman
- Phyllis Douglas as Sadie
- Ted Eccles as Cimarron Cravat – Age 2
- LaRue Farlow as Dancer
- Franklyn Farnum as Townsman At Schoolhouse
- George Ford as Townsman At Celebration
- Coleman Francis as Mr. Geer
- Ben Gary as Reporter
- James Halferty as Cimarron Cravat – Age 10
- Sam Harris as Ball Guest
- Lars Hensen as Dancer At Ball
- Clegg Hoyt as "Great" Gotch
- Irene James as Townswoman
- Colin Kenny as Townsman At Schoolhouse
- Paul Kruger as Party Guest
- Jimmy Lewis as Hefner Boy
- Dawn Little Sky as Arita Red Feather
- Eddie Little Sky as Ben Red Feather
- Buzz Martin as Cimarron Cravat as Young Man
- Kermit Maynard as Setter
- Mathew McCue as Townsman
- J. Edward McKinley as Beck
- Walter Merrill as Reporter
- Jack Perry as Townsman
- John Pickard as Ned, Cavalry Captain
- Ralph Reed as Bellboy
- William Remick as Reporter
- Gene Roth as Connors
- Jack Scroggy as Walter
- Charles Seel as Charles
- Bernard Sell as Townsman At Celebration
- Jack Stoney as Man At Lynching
- Harry Tenbrook as Sooner At Camp Fight
- Arthur Tovey as Dancer At Ball
- Ivan Triesault as Lewis Venable, Sabra's Father
- Charles Watts as Lou Brothers, Politician
- Helen Westcott as Miss Kuye, Schoolteacher
- Robert Williams as Oil Worker
- Jeane Wood as Clubwoman
- Wilson Wood as Reporter
- Jorie Wyler as Theresa Jump

== Production ==
In February 1941, MGM bought the remake rights to Cimarron from RKO for $100,000. In 1947, MGM announced an operetta version starring Kathryn Grayson and produced by Arthur Freed, but this did not happen. In February 1958, MGM announced its plans to produce Cimarron as the studio's second film using the MGM Camera 65 process following Raintree Country (1957). One month later, Elizabeth Taylor and Rock Hudson were considered to star in the film. Ultimately, Glenn Ford, who previously starred in the Westerns such as 3:10 to Yuma (1957) and The Sheepman (1958), was attached to star. In October 1959, Arnold Schulman was signed to write the screenplay. For his script, Schulman introduced several characters, including those of journalist Sam Pegler (Robert Keith) and Wes Jennings (Vic Morrow), while removing the Cravats' daughter, Donna and a boy named Isaiah. King Vidor declined an invitation to direct.

Anthony Mann was eventually named as director. He had pitched to his vision to MGM executives, explaining: "I wanted to show a huge plain out in the West with nothing on it, and how a group of men and women gathered at a line, and tore out across this plain and set up their stakes as claim for the land. And how a town, a city and finally a metropolis grew, all on this one piece of land." Principal photography was shot in Arizona, most particularly the depiction of the Oklahoma Land Rush, which featured over 1,000 extras, 700 horses and 500 wagons and buggies.

As production continued, the on-location shoot experienced dust storms, in which producer Edmund Grainger decided to relocate the production on the studio backlot despite Mann's insistence to film entirely on location. Mann explained: "We had a couple of storms—which I shot in anyway—but they thought we'd have floods and so on, so they dragged us in and everything had to be duplicated on the set. The story had to be changed, because we couldn't do the things we wanted to. So I don't consider it a film. I just consider it a disaster." Mann left the production, and director Charles Walters finished the film but received no screen credit. Mann was also critical of the film's final cut, explaining that Ford was meant to die on screen. Years later, he explained: "There was a huge oil sequence and oil wells were blowing up and he was saving people and being very heroic. Why they ever changed it I'll never know – this was Mr. Sol Siegel, he did it behind my back, I didn't ever see it. If I'd screamed they wouldn't have bothered anyway; so I just let them destroy it at will."

Also, during filming, Anne Baxter, who played Dixie Lee, revealed in her autobiography Intermission that Ford and Maria Schell developed an offscreen romance: "During shooting, they'd scrambled together like eggs. I understood she'd even begun divorce proceedings in Germany. It was obviously premature of her." However, by the end of filming, "... he scarcely glanced or spoke in her direction, and she looked as if she were in shock."

Arnold Schulman later called Mann "a nice, sweet man, but I got the feeling he was sort of burned out. The whole film was a disaster. The studio was a mess. The head of the studio was in danger of being fired. There was a lot of tension; the picture was costing too much; and we couldn't get the script right. It was a badly written script. I take my share of the credit. I didn't mean it to be bad, but it was one of those things you get sucked up into." Schulman said "I destroyed" the novel. "I regret it... I didn't mean to. We were just trying to solve the problems of the picture. But once we were given the cast, Glenn Ford and Maria Schell—what the hell was she doing in an Edna Ferber story?—what could we do? We were dead from that moment on."

== Reception ==
=== Box office ===
According to MGM records, Cimarron earned $2,325,000 in the U.S. and Canada and $2,500,000 overseas, resulting in an overall loss of $3,618,000.

=== Critical reaction ===
Harrison's Reports wrote: "The background music is undistinguished. There's enough marquee strength, action, romance, and the 'land rush' scene at the beginning is worth the price of a soft ticket. Color photography is outstanding." Thomas M. Pryor, reviewing for Variety, praised Schell and Ford's performances, and wrote "Although Cimarron is not without flaws—thoughtful examination reveals a pretentiousness of social significance more than valid exposition—the script plays well."

Bosley Crowther of The New York Times felt the film's opening "makes for a dynamic and illustrative sequence on the screen. But once the land rush is over in this almost two-and-one-half-hour-long film—and we have to tell you it is assembled and completed within the first half-hour—the remaining dramatization of Miss Ferber's bursting 'Cimarron' simmers down to a stereotyped and sentimental cinema saga of the taming of the frontier." A review in Time magazine criticized the film's length, writing Cimarron "might more suitably have been called Cimarron-and-on-and-on-and-on. It lasts 2 hours and 27 minutes, and for at least half of that time most spectators will probably be Oklacomatose."

Filmink felt the movie flopped "in part to the fact that the material is overly geared towards Ford’s character rather than Maria Schell’s."

In a letter published in The New York Times, on March 5, 1961, Edna Ferber wrote: "I received from this second picture of my novel not one single penny in payment. I can't even do anything to stop the motion-picture company from using my name in advertising so slanted that it gives the effect of my having written the picture ... I shan't go into the anachronisms in dialogue; the selection of a foreign-born actress...to play the part of an American-born bride; the repetition; the bewildering lack of sequence....I did see Cimarron...four weeks ago. This old gray head turned almost black during those two (or was it three?) hours."

== Awards and nominations ==
In 1961, the film was nominated at the Oscars for Best Art Direction (George W. Davis, Addison Hehr, Henry Grace, Hugh Hunt and Otto Siegel) and Best Sound (Franklin Milton).

Glenn Ford's performance earned a nomination for a Laurel Award for Top Action Performance, though he did not win.

== See also ==
- List of American films of 1960
