= Taxi!!! =

- Genre: Drama
- Written by: Lanford Wilson
- Directed by: Joseph Hardy
- Starring: Martin Sheen; Eva Marie Saint
- Music by: Arthur B. Rubinstein
- Country of origin: United States
- Original language: English

Production
- Executive producer: Stan Parlan
- Producer: Joseph Hardy
- Production locations: New York City; Toronto
- Running time: 51 minutes
- Production company: Glen Warren Productions

Original release
- Network: NBC
- Release: February 2, 1978

Taxi!!! is a 1978 American made-for-television drama film starring Martin Sheen and Eva Marie Saint. Directed by Joseph Hardy, it debuted on the NBC television network as a Hallmark Hall of Fame presentation on February 2, 1978.

== Plot ==
A conversation develops between a down-to-earth taxi driver (Martin Sheen) and his passenger, a wealthy and restless matron (Eva Marie Saint) that forever changes their lives during a ride from a midtown Manhattan hotel to John F. Kennedy International Airport.

== Cast ==
- Martin Sheen as the Taxi Driver
- Eva Marie Saint as the Passenger

== Awards and nominations ==
Year	Award	Category	Recipient	Result	Ref.
1978	Primetime Emmy Awards	Outstanding Lead Actor in a Drama or Comedy Special	Martin Sheen	Nominated	
1978	Primetime Emmy Awards	Outstanding Lead Actress in a Drama or Comedy Special	Eva Marie Saint	Nominated	
