= Eva Marie Saint =

American actress (1924–2026)

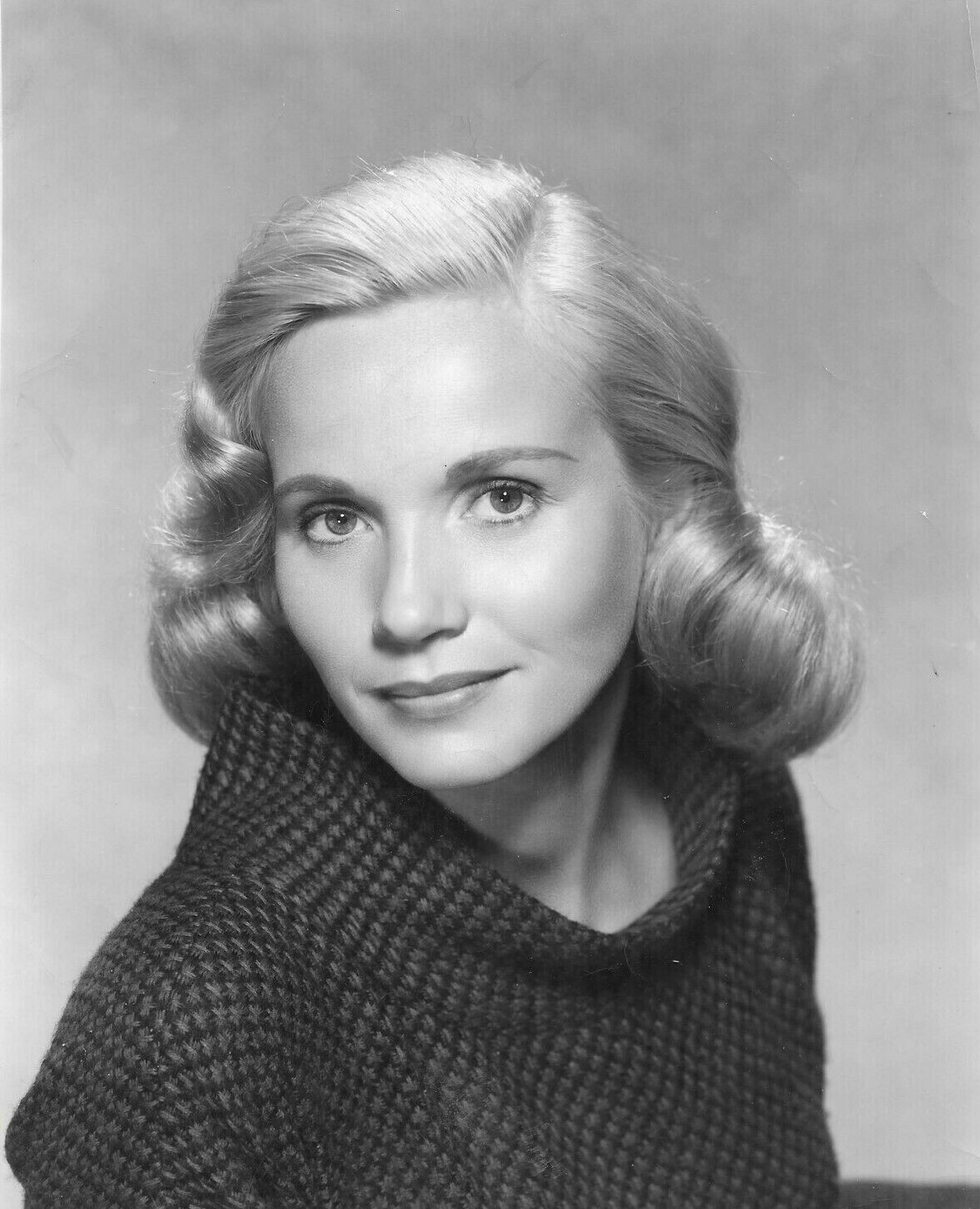
- Saint in 1951
- Born: July 4, 1924; Newark, New Jersey, U.S.
- Died: October 6, 2026 (aged 102); Los Angeles, California, U.S.
- Education: Bowling Green State University
- Occupation: Actress
- Years active: 1944–2021
- Works: Full list
- Spouse: Jeffrey Hayden (m. 1951; died 2016)
- Children: 2

Eva Marie Saint (July 4, 1924 – October 6, 2026) was an American actress. In a career spanning seven decades, she received an Academy Award and a Primetime Emmy Award, as well as nominations for two BAFTAs and a Golden Globe. At the time of her death, Saint was the oldest living Academy Award winner.

Saint graduated from Bowling Green State University in 1946 and began her acting career during the Golden Age of Television in the late 1940s. She played the role of Thelma in Horton Foote's The Trip to Bountiful (1953), for which she earned a Theatre World Award. She made her feature film debut in Elia Kazan's On the Waterfront (1954), opposite Marlon Brando. The film won eight Academy Awards, including Best Picture, and earned her the Academy Award for Best Supporting Actress along with a BAFTA nomination for Most Promising Newcomer.

Saint continued her film career with roles in That Certain Feeling (1956), Raintree County and A Hatful of Rain (both 1957); for the lattermost she was nominated for a Golden Globe and a second BAFTA Award. She then starred as Eve Kendall in Alfred Hitchcock's North by Northwest (1959), a landmark thriller that became one of the defining films of both Hitchcock's career and the suspense genre.

Saint went on to appear in Exodus (1960), 36 Hours (1964), The Sandpiper (1965), The Russians Are Coming the Russians Are Coming, Grand Prix (both 1966), Cancel My Reservation (1972), Nothing in Common (1986), I Dreamed of Africa (2000), Because of Winn-Dixie (2005), and Superman Returns (2006). She won a Primetime Emmy Award for the television miniseries People Like Us (1990). Her last theatrical film appearance was in Winter's Tale (2014). For her contributions to motion pictures and television, Saint received two stars on the Hollywood Walk of Fame.

== Early life ==
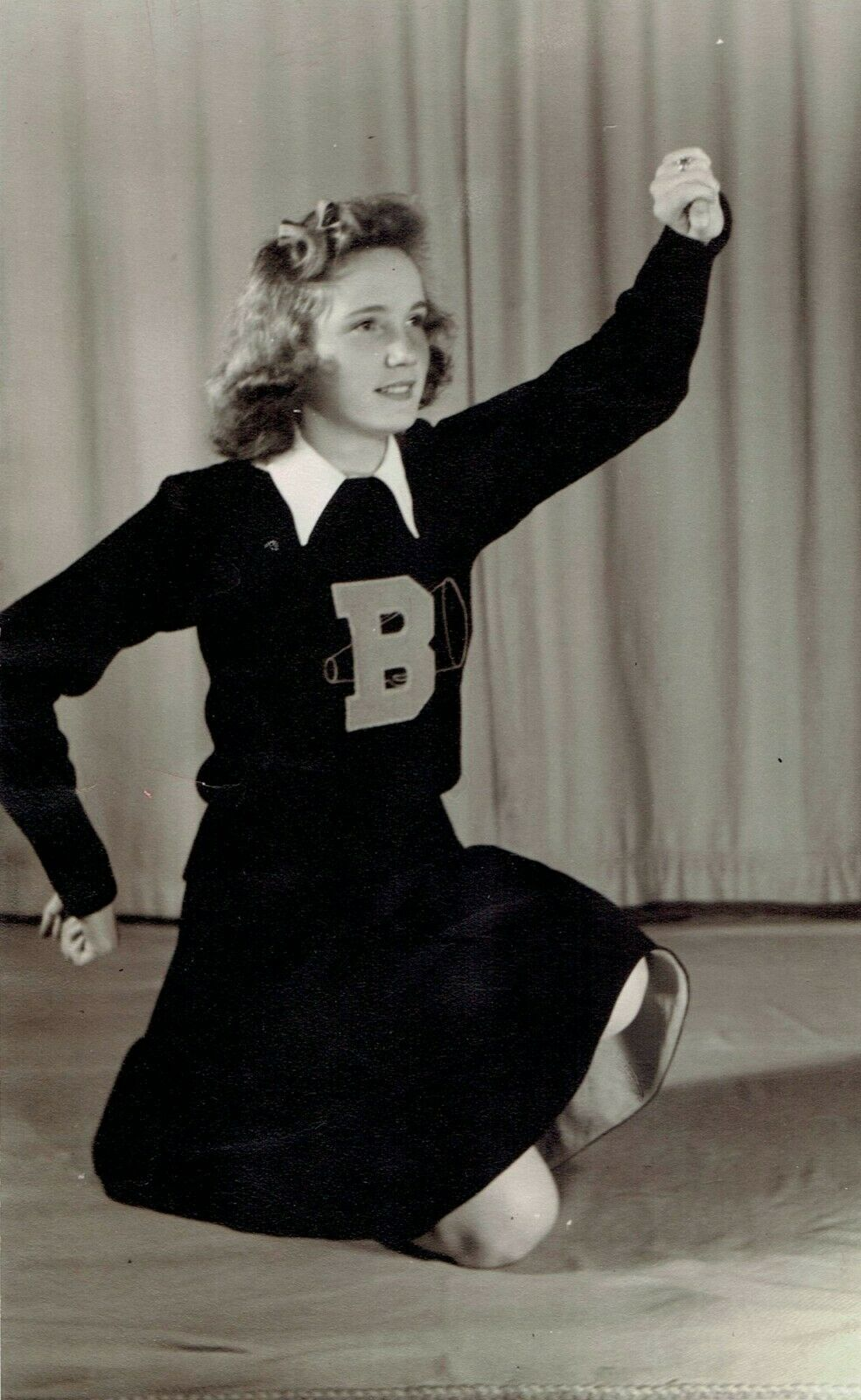
Saint in her cheerleader uniform in high school, 1942

Eva Marie Saint was born on July 4, 1924, in Newark, New Jersey, (Note: Though government records show she was born in Newark, some obituaries erroneously reported East Orange, New Jersey as her birthplace.) to John Merle Saint and Eva Marie (née Rice) Saint. Her parents were Quakers. She attended Bethlehem Central High School in Delmar, New York, graduating in 1942. Saint studied acting at Bowling Green State University in Ohio, where she joined the Delta Gamma sorority.

During this time, Saint played the lead role in a production of Personal Appearance. She was an active member of the theater honorary fraternity, Theta Alpha Phi, and served as record keeper of the student council in 1944. Saint graduated from Bowling Green in 1946. A theater on its campus is named after her.

== Career ==
=== Early television career ===
Saint's introduction to television began as an NBC page. She appeared in the live NBC-TV show Campus Hoopla from 1946 to 1947. She also appeared in Bonnie Maid's Versa-Tile Varieties on NBC in 1949 as one of the original singing "Bonnie Maids" used in the live commercials.

Saint appeared in LIFE twice prior to becoming a star. She was featured in a photograph which began a December 1, 1947, special essay about television, then a September 19, 1949, feature article about her as a struggling actress earning minimum amounts from early TV while trying to make ends meet in New York City.

In 1954, Saint won the Outer Critics Circle Special Award for her Broadway stage role in the Horton Foote play The Trip to Bountiful (1953), in which she co-starred with Lillian Gish and Jo Van Fleet. In 1955, Saint was nominated for her first Emmy for "Best Actress In A Single Performance" on The Philco Television Playhouse, playing the young mistress of middle-aged E. G. Marshall in Middle of the Night by Paddy Chayefsky. She won another Emmy nomination for the 1955 television musical version of Our Town, adapted from the Thornton Wilder play of the same name. Her success and acclaim in television productions were of such a high level that "one slightly hyperbolic primordial TV critic dubbed her 'the Helen Hayes of television.'"

=== On the Waterfront ===
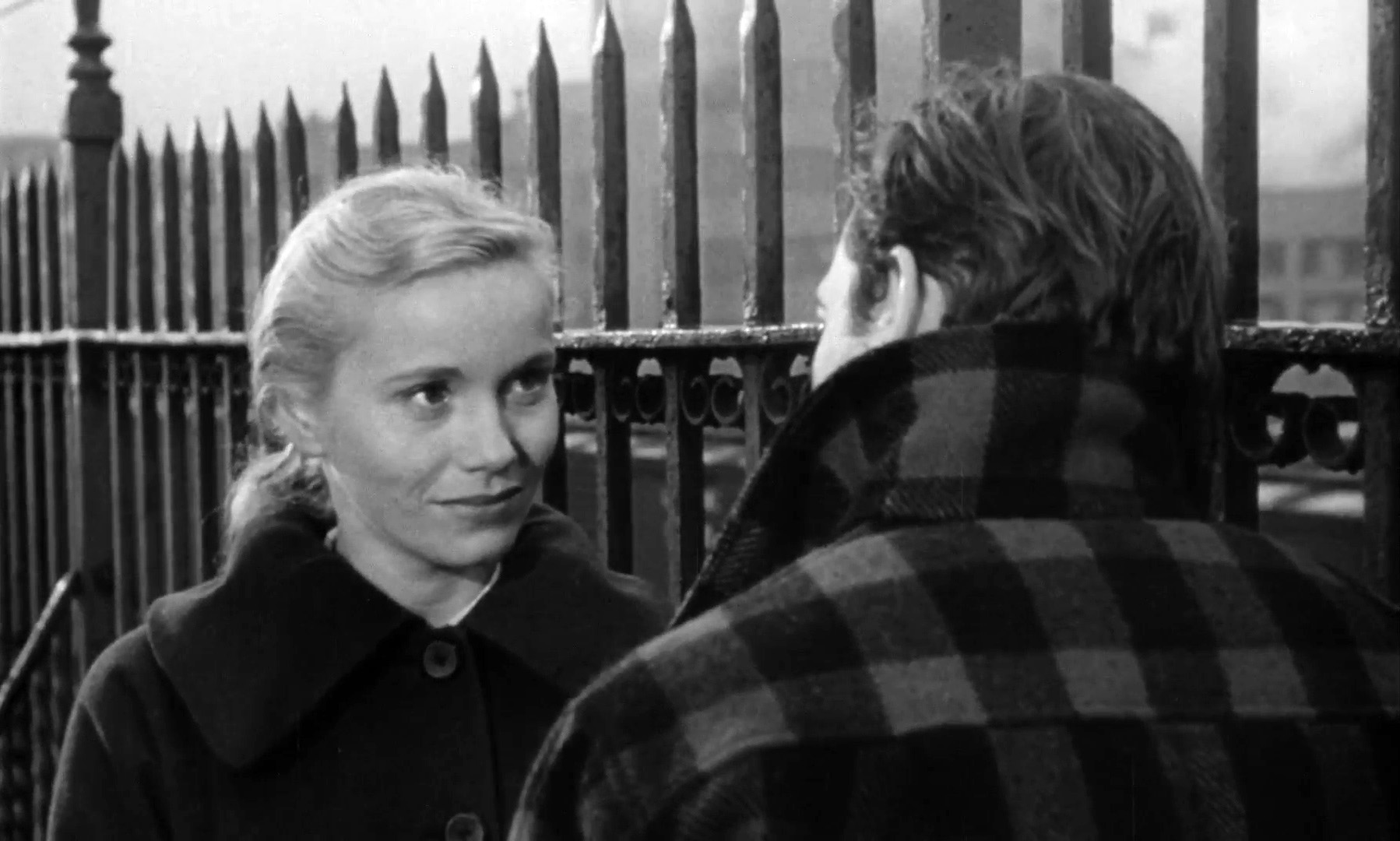
Saint and Marlon Brando in On the Waterfront, 1954

In 1954, Saint made her feature film debut in On the Waterfront, starring Marlon Brando and directed by Elia Kazan—for which she won the Academy Award for Best Supporting Actress for her performance in the role of Edie Doyle (whose brother's death sets the film's drama in motion), with her competitors having been Claire Trevor, Nina Foch, Katy Jurado and Jan Sterling. She also earned a British Academy of Film and Television Arts (BAFTA) award nomination for "Most Promising Newcomer".

In his review for The New York Times, film critic A. H. Weiler wrote, "In casting Eva Marie Saint—a newcomer to movies from TV and Broadway—Mr. Kazan has come up with a pretty and blond artisan who does not have to depend on these attributes. Her parochial school training is no bar to love with the proper stranger. Amid scenes of carnage, she gives tenderness and sensitivity to genuine romance." The film was a major success and launched Saint's film career. She received $7,500 for the role.

Saint recalled making the film, which has been highly influential, saying, "[Elia] Kazan put me in a room with Marlon Brando. He said 'Brando is the boyfriend of your sister. You're not used to being with a young man. Don't let him in the door under any circumstances.' I don't know what he told Marlon; you'll have to ask him—good luck! [Brando] came in and started teasing me. He put me off balance. And I remained off balance for the whole shoot." Her appearance in On The Waterfront is referenced in the lyrics of the 1984 song "Rattlesnakes" by Lloyd Cole and the Commotions.

In 1956, Saint appeared alongside Bob Hope in That Certain Feeling for which she received $50,000. She was then offered $100,000 to star in the Civil War drama Raintree County (1957) with Elizabeth Taylor and Montgomery Clift. After that, she starred with Don Murray in A Hatful of Rain, the pioneering drug-addiction drama, which although made later than Raintree County was released earlier in 1957. She received a nomination for the "Best Foreign Actress" award from the British Academy of Film and Television for her performance.

=== North by Northwest ===
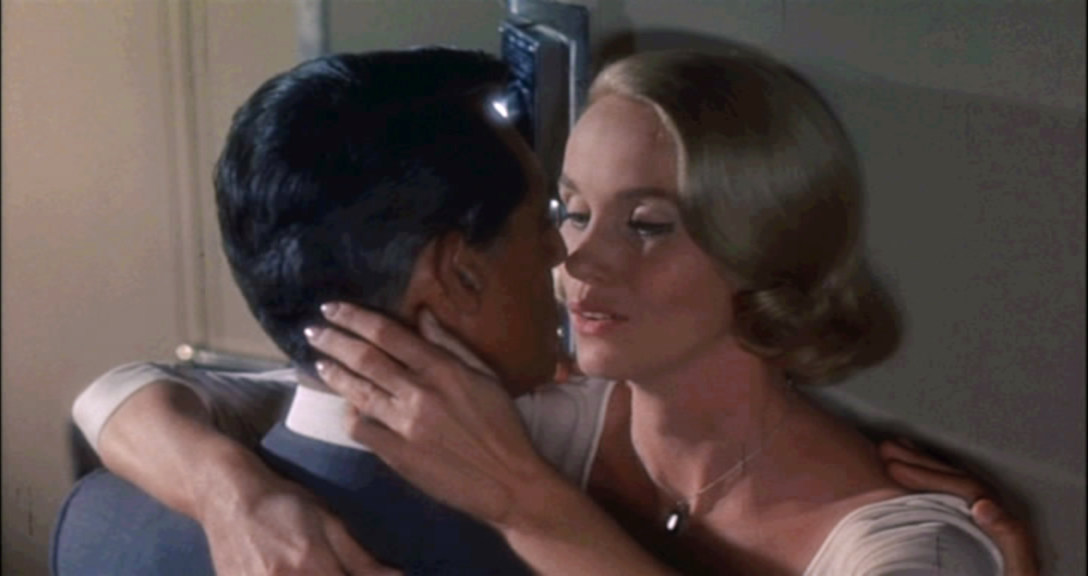
Cary Grant and Saint in North by Northwest, 1959

In 1959, director Alfred Hitchcock surprised many by choosing Saint over dozens of other candidates for the femme fatale role in what was to become the suspense classic North by Northwest with Cary Grant and James Mason. North by Northwest became a box-office hit and an influence on spy films for decades. The film ranks number forty on the American Film Institute's list of the 100 Greatest American Movies of All Time.

Hitchcock worked with Saint to make her voice lower and huskier, and personally chose costumes for her during a shopping trip to Bergdorf Goodman in New York City.

In his review of the film on August 7, 1959, The New York Times critic Abe H. Weiler wrote, "In casting Eva Marie Saint as [Cary Grant's] romantic vis-a-vis, Mr. Hitchcock has plumbed some talents not shown by the actress heretofore. Although she is seemingly a hard, designing type, she also emerges both the sweet heroine and a glamorous charmer."

In 2000, recalling her experience making the picture with Cary Grant and Hitchcock, Saint said, "[Grant] would say, 'See, Eva Marie, you don't have to cry in a movie to have a good time. Just kick up your heels and have fun.' Hitchcock said, 'I don't want you to do a sink-to-sink movie again, ever. You've done these black-and-white movies like On the Waterfront. It's drab in that tenement house. Women go to the movies, and they've just left the sink at home. They don't want to see you at the sink.'" In a 2010 interview she stated: "I said, 'I can't promise you that, Hitch, because I love those dramas.'"

=== Mid-career ===
Saint with Don Murray in A Hatful of Rain, 1957

Although North by Northwest might have propelled her to the top ranks of stardom, Saint chose to limit her film work in order to spend time with her husband since 1951, director Jeffrey Hayden, and their two children. In the 1960s, she co-starred with Paul Newman in Exodus (1960), a fictional historical drama about the founding of the state of Israel suggested by the novel of the same name by Leon Uris. It was directed by Otto Preminger. She also co-starred with Warren Beatty, Karl Malden and Angela Lansbury as a tragic beauty in the drama All Fall Down (1962).

In 1965, Saint appeared with Elizabeth Taylor and Richard Burton in the melodrama The Sandpiper for Vincente Minnelli, and with James Garner in the World War II thriller 36 Hours, directed by George Seaton. Saint joined an all-star cast in the comedic satire The Russians Are Coming, the Russians Are Coming, directed by Norman Jewison, and the international racing drama Grand Prix (1966), directed by Frankenheimer and presented in Cinerama.

In 1970, Saint starred in Loving, alongside George Segal. The film was about a commercial artist's relationship with his wife and other women; it was critically acclaimed but did not have wide viewership. She was reunited with Bob Hope for the comedy Cancel My Reservation (1972), co-starring Anne Archer.

In the 1970s and 1980s, with her return to television, Saint saw a resurgence in her career. She received an Emmy nomination for the 1977 miniseries How The West Was Won and a 1978 Emmy nomination for Taxi!!!. She was reunited with On the Waterfront co-star Karl Malden in the television film Fatal Vision, this time as the wife of his character, as he investigated the murder of his daughter and granddaughters. She played the mother of Cybill Shepherd in the television series Moonlighting, a role that spanned episodes over three years.

=== Later career ===
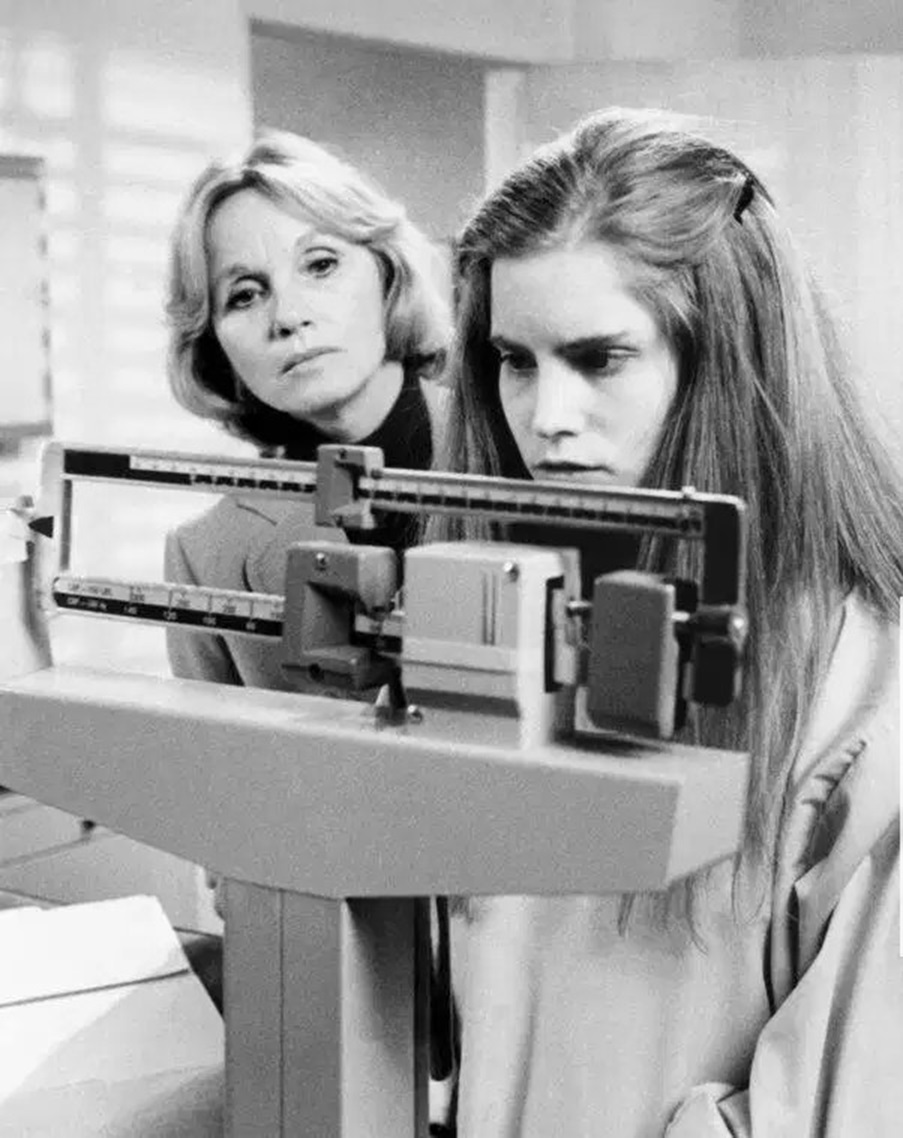
Saint with Jennifer Jason Leigh in The Best Little Girl in the World (1981)

In 1986, Saint returned to the big screen for the first time in over a decade in Nothing in Common, in which she played the mother of Tom Hanks's character; it was directed by Garry Marshall. After receiving five nominations, she won her first Emmy Award for the 1990 miniseries People Like Us. She appeared in a number of television productions in the 1990s, and was cast as the mother of radio producer Roz Doyle in a 1999 episode of the comedy series Frasier.

In 2000, Saint returned to feature films in I Dreamed of Africa with Kim Basinger. In 2005, she co-starred with Jessica Lange and Sam Shepard in Don't Come Knocking. Also in 2005, she appeared in the family film Because of Winn-Dixie, co-starring AnnaSophia Robb, Jeff Daniels and Cicely Tyson.

In 2006, Saint appeared in Superman Returns as Martha Kent, the adoptive mother of Superman, alongside Brandon Routh and archival footage of her On the Waterfront co-star Marlon Brando. Saint was presented one of the Golden Boot Awards in 2007 for her contributions to western cinema.

Saint lent her voice to the 2012 Nickelodeon animated series The Legend of Korra, a sequel to the hit TV show Avatar: The Last Airbender, playing the now-elderly Katara, a main character from the original series. In September 2012, Saint was cast as the adult version of Willa in the film adaptation of the novel Winter's Tale by Mark Helprin.

At the age of 93, Saint appeared at the 2018 Academy Award ceremony to present the award for Costume Design. She received a standing ovation upon entering the stage. In 2021, Saint appeared alongside Marisa Tomei in the podcast play series The Pack Podcast as part of the segment "The Bus Ride".

In 1960, Saint became one of the few actresses to be given two stars on the Hollywood Walk of Fame, one for her contributions to television and one for her contributions to motion pictures. The one for motion pictures is at 6624 Hollywood Boulevard, and the one for television is at 6730 Hollywood Boulevard.

== Personal life and death ==
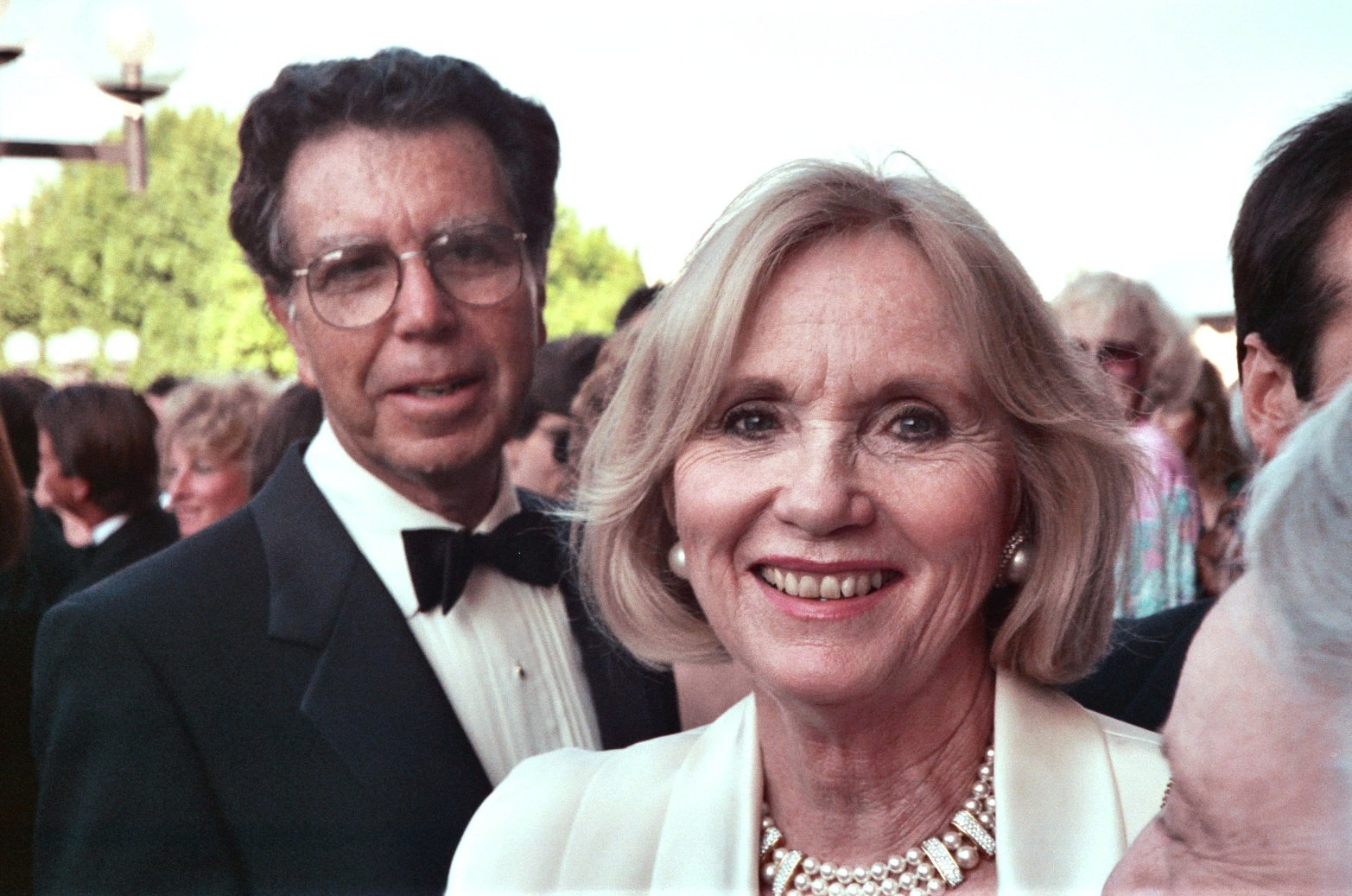
Saint and her husband, Jeffrey Hayden, at the 1990 Emmy Awards

Saint married producer and director Jeffrey Hayden on October 28, 1951. They had a son and daughter. Their son was born two days after she won an Academy Award for On the Waterfront. She began her acceptance speech by saying, "I may have the baby right here!" Saint and Hayden had four grandchildren and were married for 65 years until Hayden's death in 2016.

On July 4, 2024, Saint turned 100. She spent her 100th birthday celebrating with four generations of family members in Los Angeles.

Saint died at her home in Los Angeles, on October 6, 2026, at the age of 102. She was interred at Santa Barbara Cemetery.

== Legacy ==
Following her death, The New York Times called Saint a "luminous beauty with dramatic depth" who brought a "layered intensity to harrowing roles". The Hollywood Reporter called her an "ethereal beauty" who "dazzled" audiences in her films. USA Today noted that Saint was "one of the last figures of a bygone Hollywood era". The Los Angeles Times called her a "graceful actor". After her death, she was remembered as one of the last living actors from the Hollywood Golden era and a "Hollywood icon". Rolling Stone called Saint a "revered actress", whose performances in North by Northwest (1959) and On the Waterfront (1954), "encapsulated the glories of the 1950s' Hollywood studio system". The Associated Press called her film debut in On the Waterfront as "one of the most spectacular debuts in Hollywood history".

For her role in North by Northwest, Saint was regarded as an iconic leading lady who redefined the way leading women were seen on film. The Daily Telegraph called Saint the "blueprint for the Bond girl" despite the fact that Saint never starred in any James Bond films. Her role in North by Northwest and Saint's "femme fatale" character in the film were noted as inspirations for the Bond girl characters. The BBC also noted this in their obituary of Saint, saying that she helped "create the sophisticated, sexually confident and intelligent blonde-haired archetype" seen in Bond girls. In a retrospective article highlighting her career, The New York Times noted that Saint specialized in "complex sympathetic women" who did their best to combat "domestic and cultural storms" while noting her ability to "add complexity and depth" to "good woman types". The Guardian also noted that Saint had "something distinctive to offer [for] that leading lady template" whose "style of femininity became unfashionable" and regarded Saint as a cinematic icon.

With her expansive career, Saint was regarded as one of the last major performers who linked the golden age of Hollywood, the rise of television and the modern film era. The British Film Institute noted that throughout her extensive career, Saint was able to "combine Hollywood glamour with Actors Studio integrity" while also noting that she was "synonymous with elegance". Rolling Stone called her "one of the last bridges to Hollywood's Golden Age".

Film critic Leonard Maltin noted that Saint was a "luminous blond leading lady who found few vehicles worthy of her talents". Upon listing the "100 Great Moments in the Movies", film critic Roger Ebert noted the scene where Saint is clinging to Cary Grant's hand on Mount Rushmore in North by Northwest as one of cinema's greatest moments. Film critic Pauline Kael said that Saint's film performances were "timeless" and "stunning". On October 25, 2026, Turner Classic Movies (TCM) honored Saint with a marathon of five films, in which she starred in.

== Awards and nominations ==
Year	Institution	Category	Work	Result	Ref.
1954	Outer Circle Critics Award	Special Award	The Trip to Bountiful	Won	
1954	Theatre World Award	Outstanding Debut Performance	The Trip to Bountiful	Won	
1955	Academy Award	Best Actress in a Supporting Role	On the Waterfront	Won	
1955	BAFTA Award	Most Promising Newcomer to Film	On the Waterfront	Nominated	
1955	Emmy Award	Best Actress in a Single Performance	The Philco Television Playhouse (Episode: "Middle of the Night")	Nominated	
1956	Emmy Award	Best Actress – Single Performance	Producers' Showcase (Episode: "Our Town")	Nominated	
1958	BAFTA Award	Best Foreign Actress	A Hatful of Rain	Nominated	
1958	Golden Globe Award	Best Actress – Drama	A Hatful of Rain	Nominated	
1977	Emmy Award	Outstanding Lead Actress in a Limited Series	How the West Was Won	Nominated	
1978	Emmy Award	Outstanding Lead Actress in a Drama or Comedy Special	Taxi!!!	Nominated	
1990	Emmy Award	Outstanding Supporting Actress in a Miniseries or a Special	People Like Us	Won	
1999	Fort Lauderdale International Film Festival	Lifetime Achievement Award	–	Honored	
2000	SCAD Savannah Film Festival	Lifetime Achievement Award	–	Honored	
2004	San Luis Obispo International Film Festival	King Vidor Award	–	Honored	
2007	Golden Boot Awards	–	–	Honored	
2012	Behind the Voice Actors Voice Acting Awards	Best Female Vocal Performance in a Television Series in a Guest Role	The Legend of Korra (Episodes: "Welcome to Republic City"; "Endgame")	Won	
2018	Bowling Green State University	Lifetime Achievement Award	–	Honored	

== See also ==
- List of American film actresses
- List of Bowling Green State University alumni
- List of centenarians (actors, filmmakers and entertainers)
