= Cancel My Reservation =

1972 film by Paul Bogart

- Theatrical release poster
- Directed by: Paul Bogart
- Written by: Robert Fisher; Arthur Marx
- Based on: The Broken Gun by Louis L'Amour
- Starring: Bob Hope; Eva Marie Saint; Ralph Bellamy; Forrest Tucker; Anne Archer; Keenan Wynn; Henry Darrow; Chief Dan George
- Cinematography: Russell Metty
- Edited by: Michael A. Hoey
- Music by: Dominic Frontiere
- Distributed by: Warner Bros.
- Release date: September 21, 1972
- Running time: 99 minutes
- Country: United States
- Language: English

Cancel My Reservation is a 1972 American comedy film starring Bob Hope and Eva Marie Saint, and directed by Paul Bogart. The movie was Bob Hope's last of over 50 theatrical features as leading man, a screen run begun in 1938. It was also Eva Marie Saint's last film before she took a break from the big screen until 1986's Nothing in Common.

== Plot ==
Television personality Dan Bartlett, having difficulties with his wife and TV co-star Sheila, retreats to his Arizona ranch. When the body of Mary Little Cloud is found in the back seat of his car, Dan is placed under arrest.

Freed for lack of evidence, Dan returns home to find attractive, scantily clad Crazy Hollister there. Her stepfather John Ed owns a 50,000 acre property nearby. Crazy is upset that John Ed has blocked her inheritance and may have even murdered her mother.

Sheila shows up and believes she has caught Dan having an affair, but Crazy convinces her that's not true. Meanwhile, county recorder Snagby tries to blackmail John Ed with information Mary Little Cloud gave him, but John Ed's evil henchman Reese has him killed. Sheriff Riley once again thinks Dan is responsible.

The Bartletts are taken captive by Reese and sealed inside a cave. There they renew their love. Riley is able to free them while Crazy finds proof that Mary Little Cloud had a document showing her tribe to be the lawful owner of John Ed's land. Reese is betrayed by John Ed, who ultimately learns that crime doesn't pay. Dan and Sheila can't wait to get back to their old lives.

== Cast ==
- Bob Hope as Dan Bartlett
- Eva Marie Saint as Sheila Bartlett
- Ralph Bellamy as John Ed
- Forrest Tucker as Reese
- Anne Archer as Crazy Hollister
- Keenan Wynn as Sheriff 'Houndtooth' Riley
- Chief Dan George as 'Old Bear'
- Pat Morita as Yamamoto
- Tracy Bogart as Teenage Girl
- Betty Ann Carr as Mary Little Cloud
- Henry Darrow as Joe Little Cloud
- Doodles Weaver as Cactus (Deputy Sheriff)

=== Uncredited cameo appearances ===
- Johnny Carson as himself
- Bing Crosby as himself
- John Wayne as himself
- Flip Wilson as himself

== Reception ==
Like most of Bob Hope's later movie efforts, Cancel My Reservation was not a success at the box office and was panned by critics. Hope and his wife Dolores attended the film's premiere at Radio City Music Hall in New York City (incidentally during a strike by the Musicians' Union, which prevented the band or the Rockettes from performing) and he reputedly bemoaned that he was getting too old to play a leading man and therefore would not make another feature film, although he would make cameo appearances in later films.
