= Beyond Silence (1960 film) =

1960 film

- Directed by: Edmond Levy
- Production company: Milner-Fenwick
- Distributed by: United States Information Agency
- Release date: 1960
- Country: United States
- Language: English

Beyond Silence is a 1960 American short documentary film directed by Edmond Levy. It was nominated for an Academy Award for Best Documentary Short. It is about Gallaudet College, a school for the deaf.

== See also ==
- List of American films of 1960
