= Kenneth A. Reid =

American art director (1919–1996)

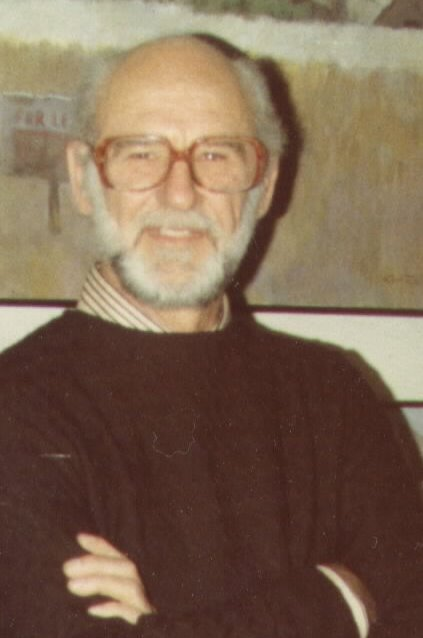
- Born: March 17, 1919; Uruguay
- Died: June 30, 1996 (aged 77); Los Angeles, California, USA
- Occupation: Art director
- Years active: 1960-1978

Kenneth A. Reid (March 17, 1919 – June 30, 1996) was an American art director. He was nominated for an Academy Award in the category Best Art Direction for the film The Facts of Life.

== Selected filmography ==
- The Facts of Life (1960)
