= Academy Award for Best Original Song =

Motion picture award for music

- Country: United States
- Presented by: Academy of Motion Picture Arts and Sciences (AMPAS)
- First award: February 27, 1935; 91 years ago (for films released in 1934)
- Most recent winner: Ejae, Mark Sonnenblick, Joong Gyu-kwak, Yu Han Lee, Hee Dong Nam, Jeong Hoon Seo & Teddy Park "Golden" (2025)
- Website: oscars.org

The Academy Award for Best Original Song is one of the awards given annually to people working in the motion picture industry by the Academy of Motion Picture Arts and Sciences (AMPAS). It is presented to the songwriters who have composed the best original song written specifically for a film. The performers of a song are not credited with the Academy Award unless they contributed either to music, lyrics, or both in their own right. The songs that are nominated for this award are typically performed during the ceremony and before this award is presented.

The award category was introduced at the 7th Academy Awards, the ceremony honoring the best in film for 1934. Nominations are made by Academy members who are songwriters and composers, and the winners are chosen by the Academy membership as a whole. Fifteen songs are shortlisted before nominations are announced.

== Eligibility ==
As of 2019, the Academy's rules stipulate that "an original song consists of words and music, both of which are original and written specifically for the motion picture. It must be clearly audible, intelligible, substantive rendition (not necessarily visually presented) of both lyric and melody, used in the body of the motion picture or as the first music cue in the end credits."

The original requirement was only that the nominated song appear in a motion picture during the previous year. This rule was changed after the 1941 Academy Awards, when "The Last Time I Saw Paris", from the film Lady Be Good, with music by Jerome Kern and lyrics by Oscar Hammerstein II, won. Kern was upset that his song won because it had been published and recorded before it was used in the film. Kern thought that "Blues in the Night" by Harold Arlen (Music) and Johnny Mercer (lyrics) should have won. Kern's song was actually written in 1940, after the Germans occupied Paris at the start of World War II. It was recorded by Kate Smith and peaked at No. 8 on the bestseller list before it was used in the film.

Kern got the Academy to change the rule so that only songs that are "original and written specifically for the motion picture" are eligible to win. Songs that rely on sampled or reworked material along with cover versions, remixes and parodies, such as "Gangsta's Paradise" (which samples "Pastime Paradise" by Stevie Wonder) in the 1995 film Dangerous Minds, are also ineligible.

This rule means that when a film is adapted from a previously produced stage musical, none of the existing songs from the musical are eligible. As a result, many recent film adaptations of musicals have included additional original songs which could be nominated, such as "You Must Love Me" in the 1996 film Evita (won award), and "Listen", "Love You I Do", "Patience" in the 2006 film Dreamgirls, and "Suddenly" in the 2012 film Les Misérables.

There was a debate whether Glen Hansard and Markéta Irglová, who were awarded the Oscar in 2008 for "Falling Slowly", were in fact eligible. "Falling Slowly" had been released on two other albums – The Swell Season, Hansard and Irglová's duo project, and The Cost, by Hansard's band The Frames. The Swell Season was released in August 2006, and The Cost in February 2007, before the release of Once. It was also used in the movie Beauty in Trouble and released on its soundtrack in September 2006. However, the AMPAS music committee determined that, in the course of the film's protracted production, the composers had "played the song in some venues that were deemed inconsequential enough to not change the song's eligibility". The same issue arose two years earlier with "In the Deep" from Crash, which appeared on Bird York's 2003 album The Velvet Hour after being written for Crash, but before the film was released. The current Academy rule says an eligible song "must be recorded for use in the motion picture prior to any other usage", so recordings released prior to the film will not disqualify a song as long as the film version was recorded before then.

== Number of nominations and submissions ==
Until the Academy Awards for 1945 (awarded in 1946) any number of songs could be nominated for the award. For the 1945 awards, 14 songs were nominated.

From 1946 to 2011, each member of the Music Branch of the Academy was asked to vote using a points system of 10, 9.5, 9, 8.5, 8, 7.5, 7, 6.5 or 6 points. Only those songs that received an average score of 8.25 or more were eligible for nomination. If no song qualified, there would be no nominees. And if only one song achieved that score, it and the song receiving the next highest score would be the two nominees. This system usually resulted in five nominations each year, except for 2010 when four were nominated, 1988, 2005, and 2008, when only three were nominated; and 2011 when only two were nominated.

Following the two-song competition in 2011, the rules were changed once more. Beginning with the 85th Academy Awards, the Academy established a fixed system of five nominees for Best Original Song, replacing the previous voting method that had occasionally produced fewer contenders. Since then, there have always been five nominees, except in 2013 when one was disqualified.

The first film to receive multiple nominations was Fame in 1980. Only four films have featured three nominated songs: Beauty and the Beast, The Lion King, Dreamgirls, and Enchanted. Dreamgirls and Enchanted lost on every nomination: An Inconvenient Truth original song "I Need to Wake Up" defeated all three of the nominated songs from Dreamgirls, while "Falling Slowly" from Once defeated all three of Enchanted's nominations. After these two consecutive defeats, a new rule was instated in June 2008 that a film could have no more than two songs nominated. While up to five songs from a single film can be submitted, studios sometimes submit only one, for fear that having two nominated might split the vote. By the time "We Don't Talk About Bruno" became the breakout hit from Encanto, the film's producers had submitted for the 94th Academy Awards "Dos Oruguitas", which was nominated but did not win.

== Performances at the awards ceremony ==
Nominated songs are usually performed live at the televised Academy Awards ceremonies. Although pre-televised ceremonies were broadcast on the radio, the tradition of performing the nominated songs did not begin until the 18th Academy Awards in 1946, in which performers included Frank Sinatra, Kathryn Grayson, Dinah Shore, and Dick Haymes.

In the early years, the songs were usually not performed by the original artists, as in the film. For example, in 1965, Robert Goulet performed all the nominated songs at the ceremony, and in the case of "The Look of Love", sung by Dusty Springfield in Casino Royale, the positive reaction to the performance by Sergio Mendes & Brasil '66 on the 1968 telecast led to their version being released as a single and eventually becoming very popular and successful. In 1970, this was reversed and only the people who had performed the song in the film were permitted to perform the song on the live telecast, even if a popular version was performed by another act.

However, since Oscar nominees for 1970, 1971 and 1972 had all been successful records covered by other artists, in 1973, the rule was amended again, and it became standard to first offer either the original artist who performed the song in the film a chance to perform it at the ceremony, followed by the artist who had covered the record to popularity.

When neither of those is able to do so (or in rare cases where the telecast producers decide to go with someone else), the Academy chooses other entertainers to perform the song at the ceremony. For example, Robin Williams performed "Blame Canada" from South Park: Bigger, Longer & Uncut at the 72nd Academy Awards instead of the film's voice actors, Trey Parker and Mary Kay Bergman (Bergman died a few months before the show). Beyoncé sung three nominated songs (one of which was a duet with Josh Groban for "Believe" from The Polar Express) during the 77th Academy Awards even though she did not perform those songs in any of the respective films.

That same year, the song "Al otro lado del río" ("On the Other Side of the River"), which was featured in the film The Motorcycle Diaries, won the award, becoming the first song in Spanish and the second in a non-English language to receive the award (the first winner was the title song to Never on Sunday, which was sung in Greek in the film by its star, Melina Mercouri). It was written by Uruguayan composer Jorge Drexler, but the producers would not allow Drexler perform the song during the show for fear of losing ratings. Instead, the song was performed by Carlos Santana and Antonio Banderas. Drexler's acceptance speech for the award consisted of him singing a few lines a cappella and closed by simply saying "thank you".

In 1985, the Academy rejected Phil Collins to perform his nominated composition "Against All Odds (Take a Look at Me Now)". According to representatives of both Collins' record company and Columbia Pictures, this was because the producers of the telecast were not familiar with his work. Ann Reinking performed the song instead, with Collins sitting in the audience.

At the 80th Academy Awards, "That's How You Know" from the film Enchanted was performed by Kristin Chenoweth, rather than the film's star, Amy Adams. However, Adams performed "Happy Working Song", which was nominated from the same film.

In 2009, Peter Gabriel, who was originally scheduled to perform his nominated song "Down to Earth" during the live broadcast, declined to perform after learning that he would be allowed to sing only 65 seconds of the song during the ceremony's Best Original Song nominee performance medley. Gabriel still attended the ceremony, with John Legend performing the song in his song, and the Soweto Gospel Choir singing with Legend. Likewise, the Pussycat Dolls performed the eventual winning song, "Jai Ho", instead of the original performers that same night due to their version being a hit song in the U.S.

The 84th Academy Awards did not feature performances from either nominated song ("Man or Muppet" from The Muppets or "Real in Rio" from Rio). No reason for this was given by Oscar producers. This was only the third time that Best Original Song nominees were not performed (the others were in 1989 and 2010). At the 85th Academy Awards, only three of the five nominees were performed, with the eventual winner, the theme from Skyfall, being the only song performed separately on its own (by Adele) as opposed to being part of a musical medley (the performance followed a tribute to the James Bond film series, including a complete performance of the theme from Goldfinger by Shirley Bassey). The 88th Academy Awards also had three of the five nominees performed. Anohni, performer and writer of "Manta Ray", one of the two nominated songs cut from the ceremony, boycotted the ceremony for this reason.

It was originally announced that the 91st Academy Awards would only feature two live performances due to time constraints: "Shallow" from A Star is Born and "All the Stars" from Black Panther. However, this decision was reversed days later. It was announced soon after that Kendrick Lamar and SZA had canceled their performance due to "logistics and timing" issues, making "All the Stars" the only nominee of the four not to be performed live. Rapper Eminem's song "Lose Yourself", which won the award in 2003, was the only nominated song not performed at the ceremony that year. Eminem later gave a surprise performance of the song at the Oscars in 2020. He received a standing ovation following his performance.

In 2021, performances of the nominees for Best Original Song were shown during the ceremony's pre-show, Oscars: Into the Spotlight. The live performances returned for the following year's ceremony.

In 2025, the Academy did not feature live performances of the nominated songs.

In 2026, only two of the five nominees for were performed live during the ceremony, "Golden" from KPop Demon Hunters and "I Lied to You" from Sinners.

== Winners and nominees ==
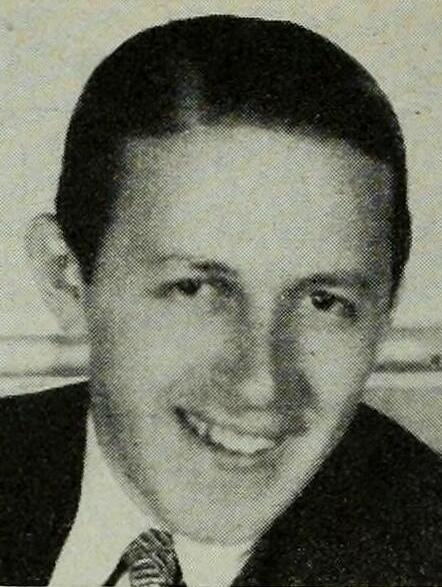
Con Conrad was the inaugural winner of this category for "The Continental" from The Gay Divorcee in 1934.

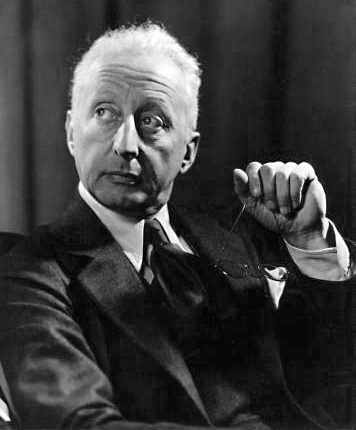
Jerome Kern won twice for "The Way You Look Tonight" from Swing Time (1936) and "The Last Time I Saw Paris" from Lady Be Good (1941).

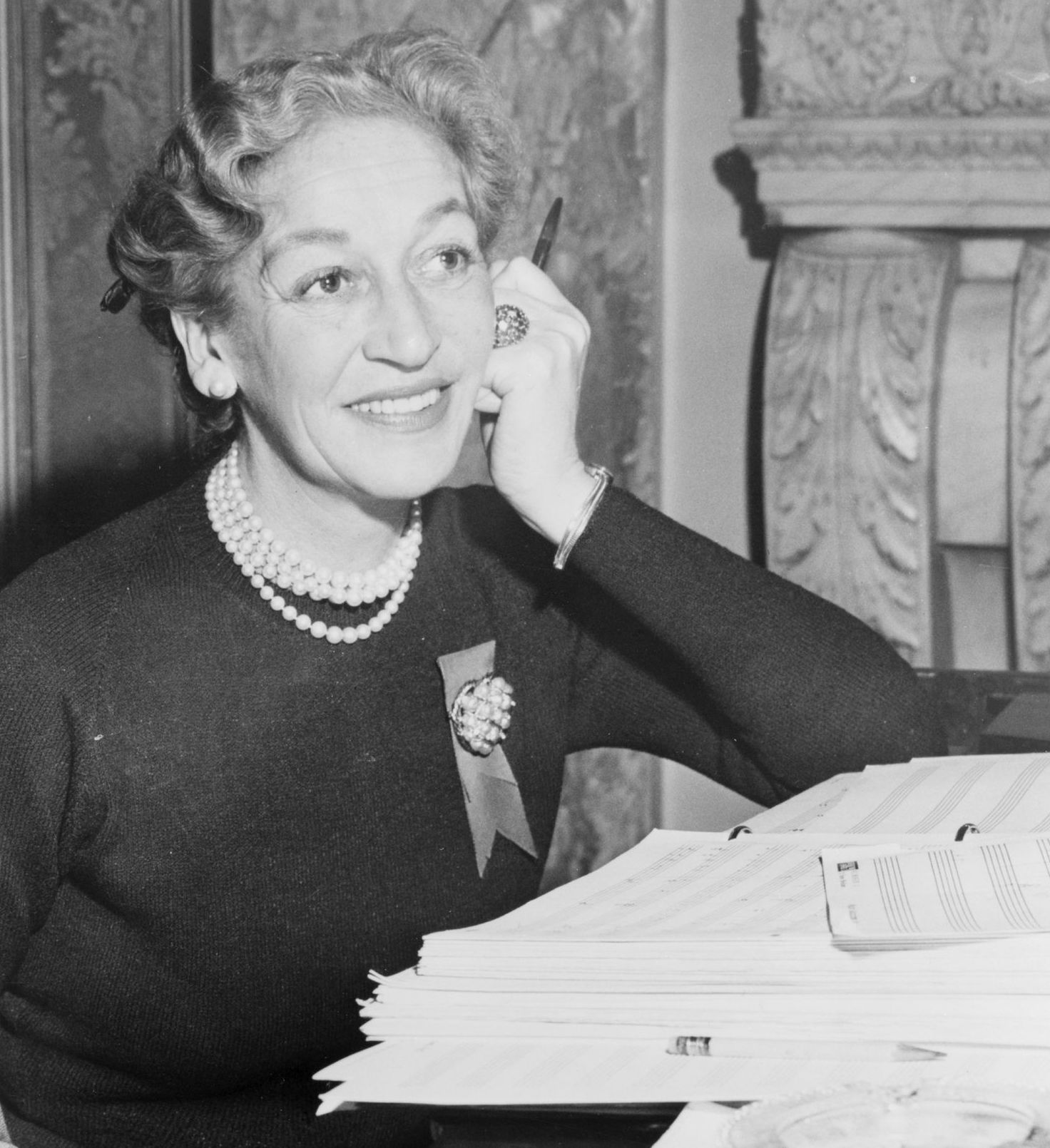
Dorothy Fields was the first female winner in this category, winning for "The Way You Look Tonight" from Swing Time (1936).

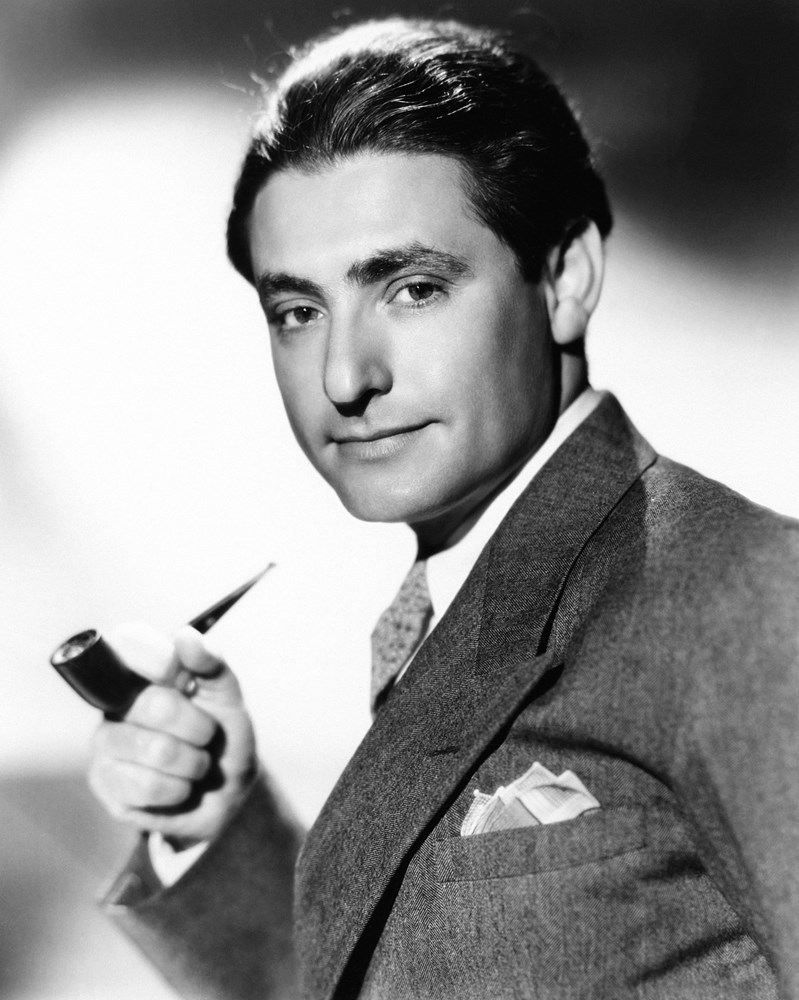
Leo Robin won for "Thanks for the Memory" from The Big Broadcast of 1938 (1938).

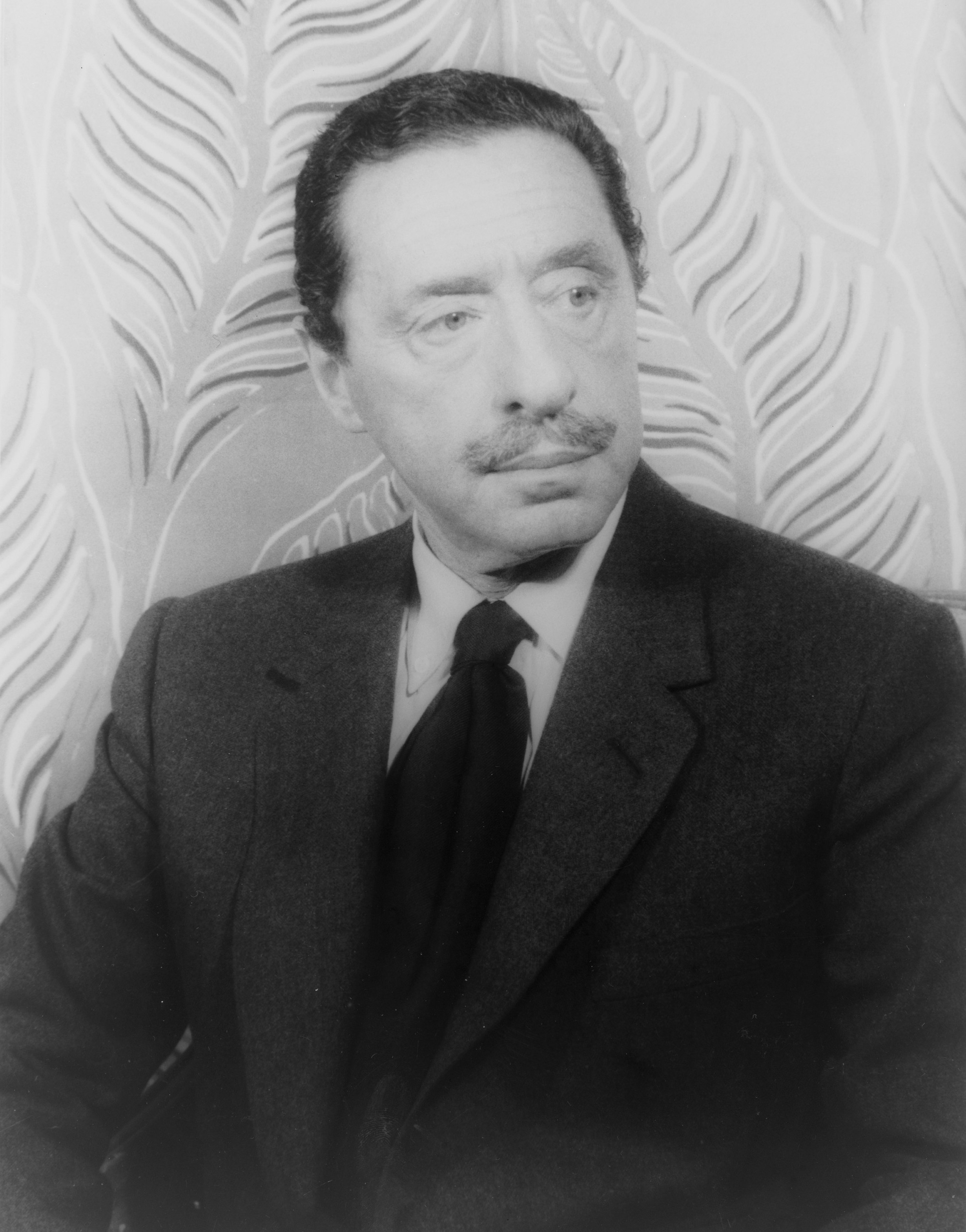
Harold Arlen won with Yip Harburg for "Over the Rainbow" from The Wizard of Oz (1939).

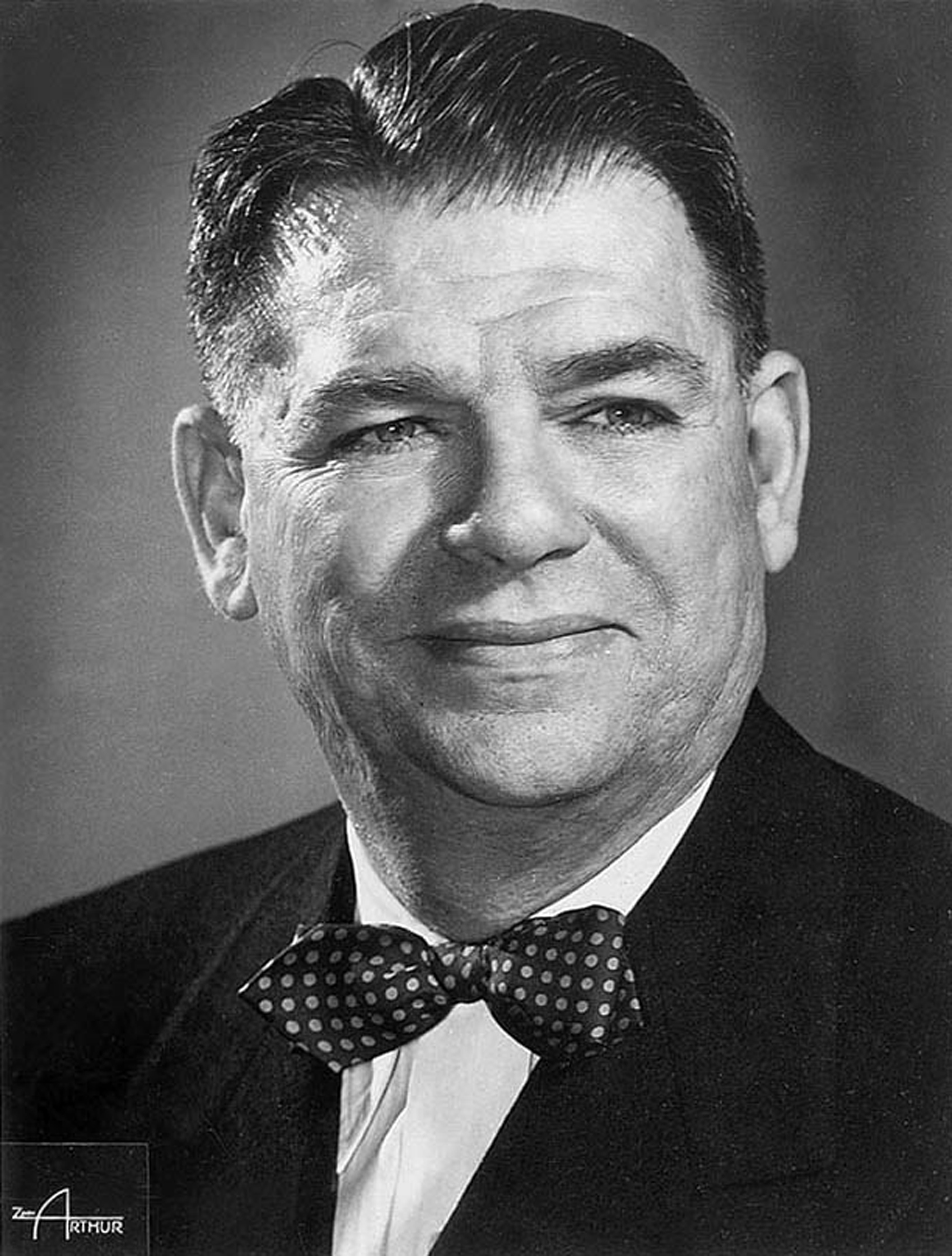
Oscar Hammerstein II won twice for "The Last Time I Saw Paris" from Lady Be Good (1941) and "It Might as Well Be Spring" from State Fair (1945).

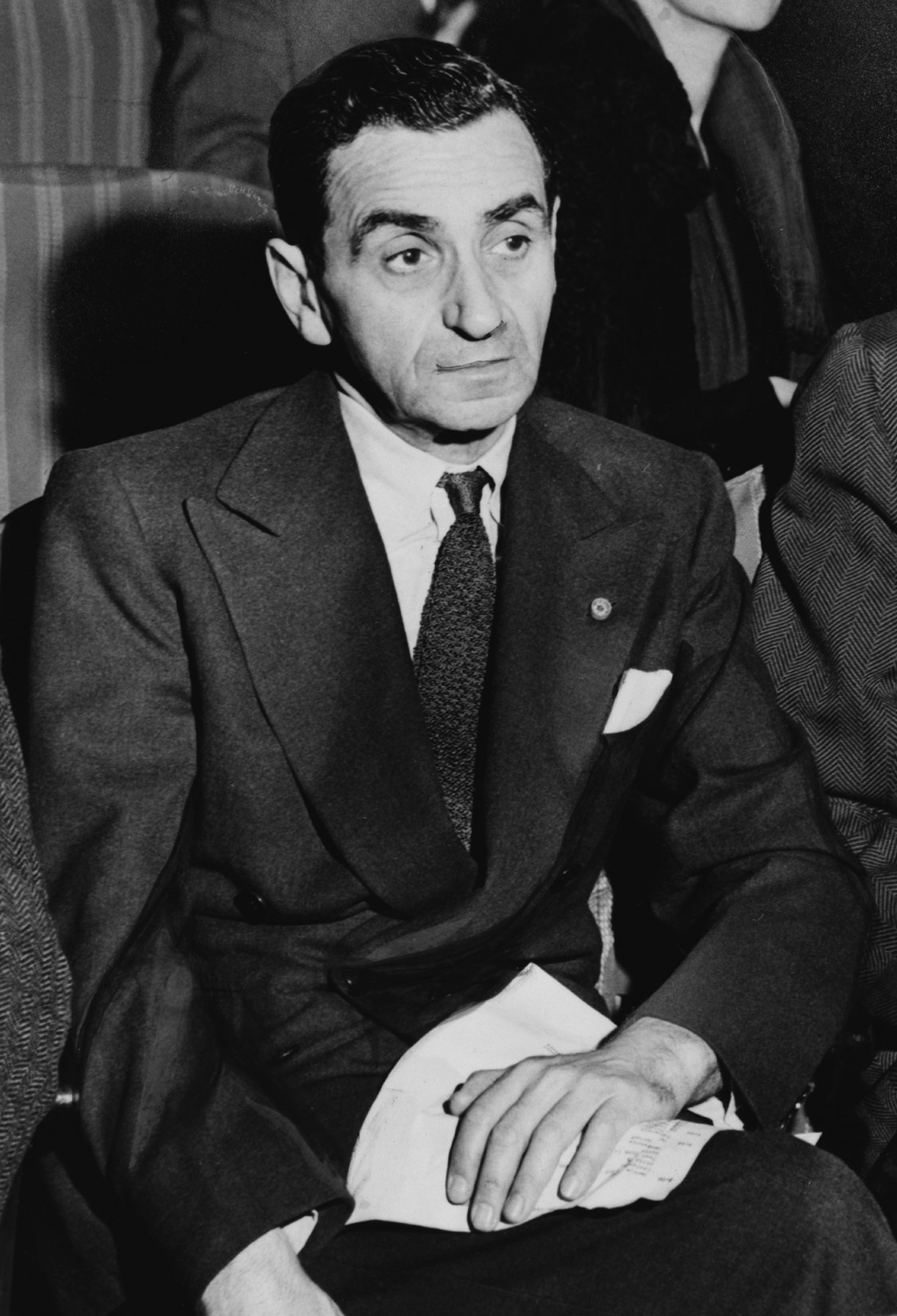
Irving Berlin won for "White Christmas" from Holiday Inn (1942).

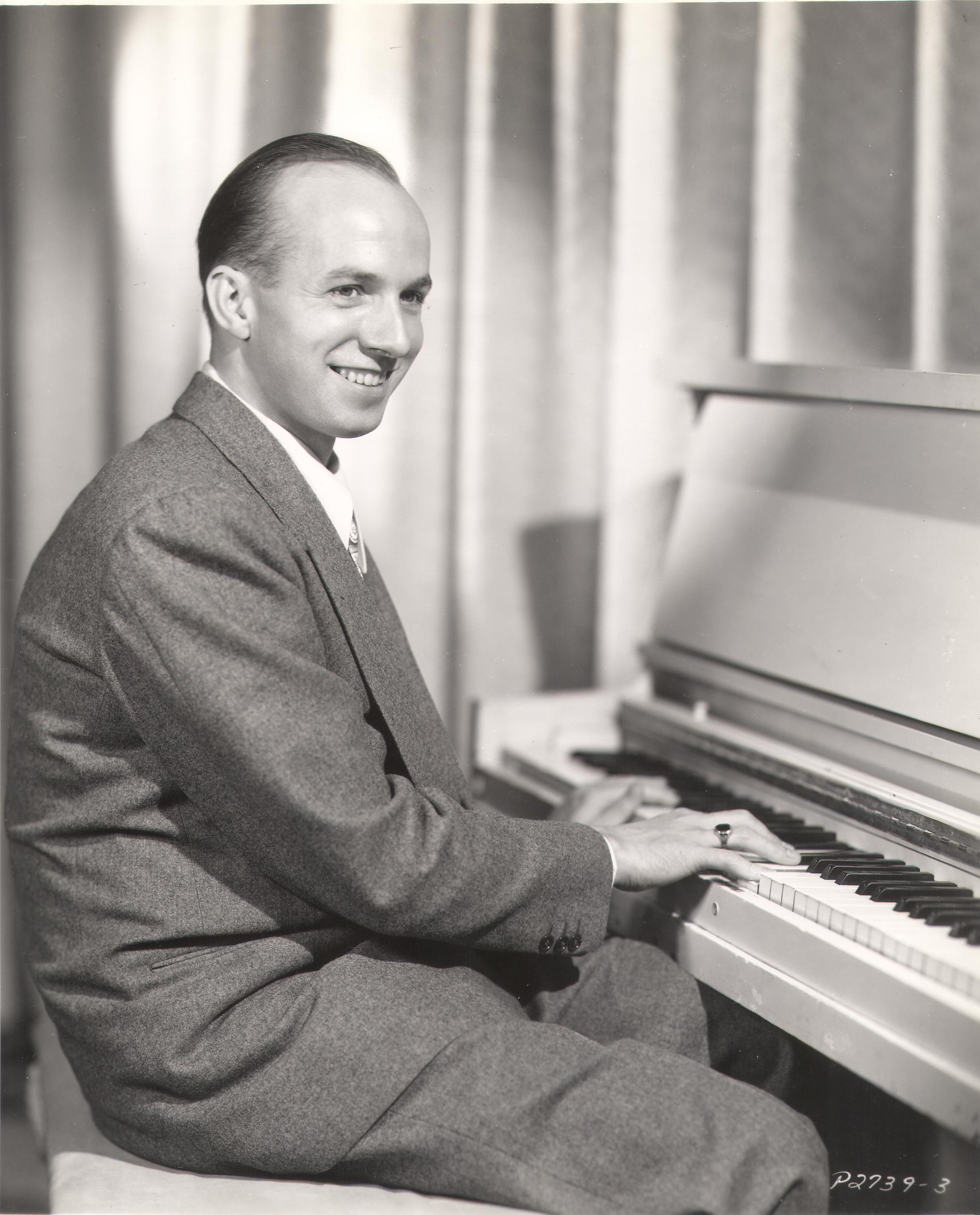
Jimmy Van Heusen won four times out of 14 nominations for "Swinging on a Star" from Going My Way (1944), "All the Way" from The Joker Is Wild (1957), "High Hopes" from A Hole in the Head (1959), and "Call Me Irresponsible" (lyrics by Sammy Cahn) for Papa's Delicate Condition (1963).

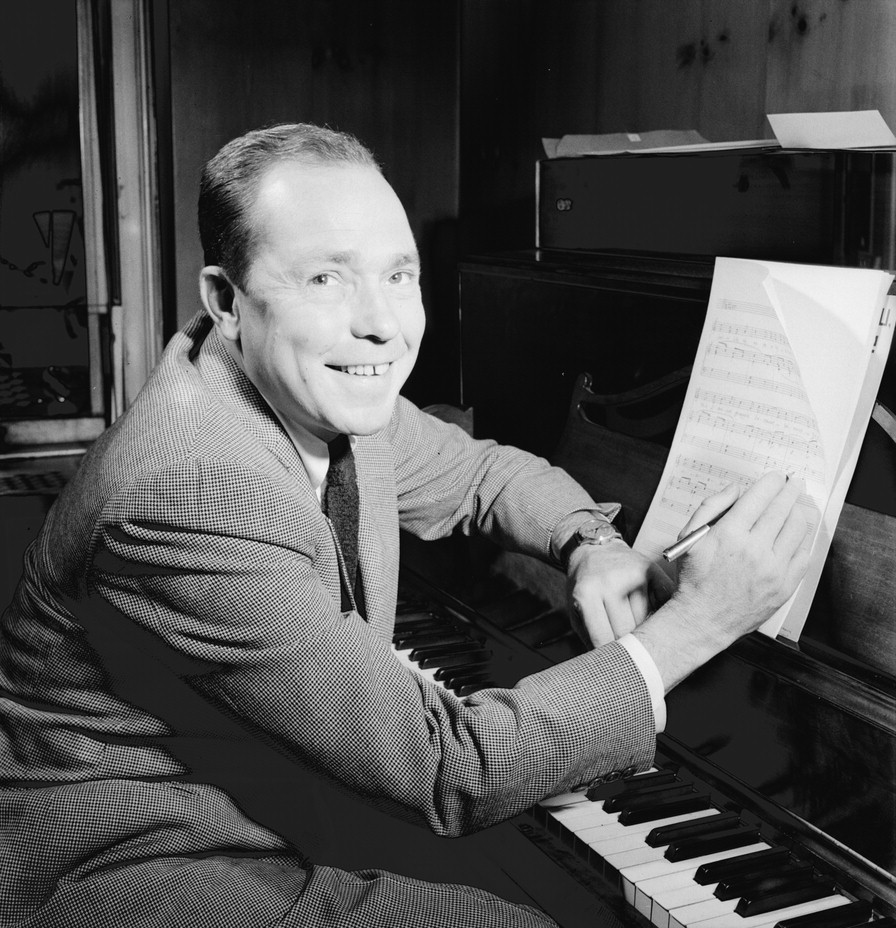
Johnny Mercer won four times out of 16 nominations for "On the Atchison, Topeka and the Santa Fe" from The Harvey Girls (1946), "In the Cool, Cool, Cool of the Evening" from Here Comes the Groom (1951), "Moon River" for Breakfast at Tiffany's (1961), "Days of Wine and Roses" from Days of Wine and Roses (1962).

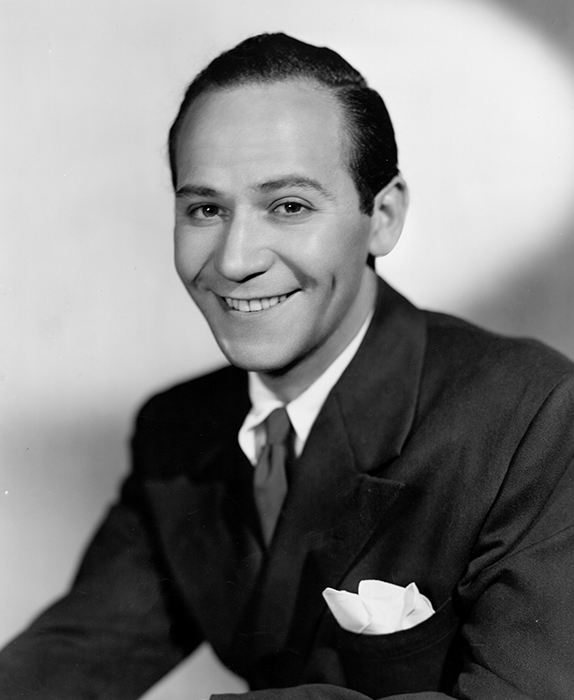
Frank Loesser won for "Baby, It's Cold Outside" from Neptune's Daughter (1949).

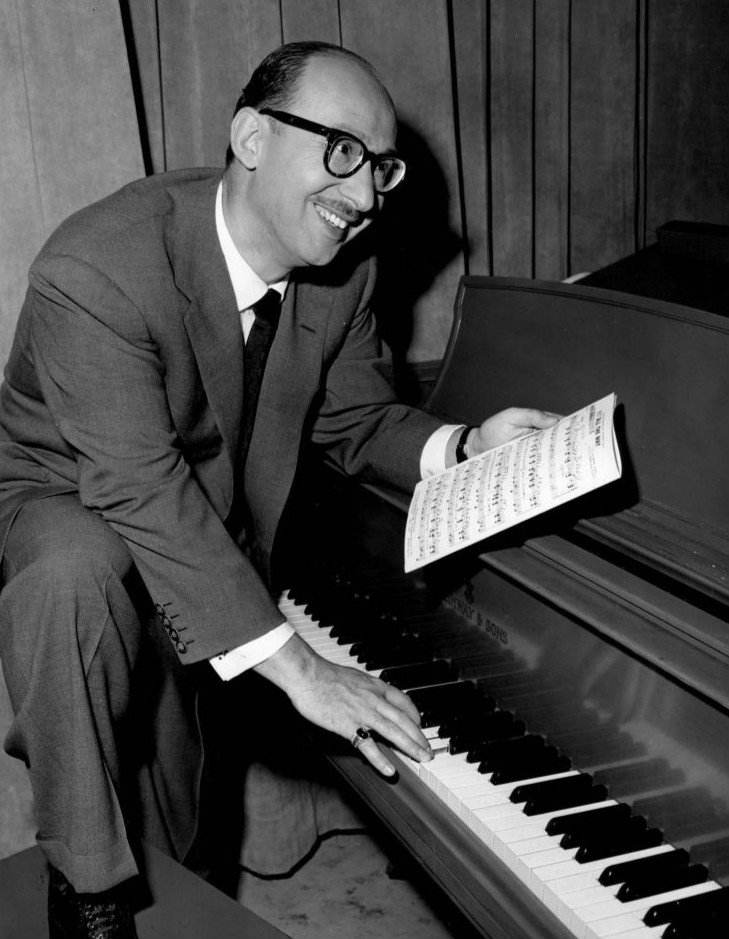
Sammy Cahn won four times out of 25 nominations for "Three Coins in the Fountain" from Three Coins in the Fountain (1954), "All the Way" from The Joker Is Wild (1957), "High Hopes" from A Hole in the Head (1959), and "Call Me Irresponsible" from Papa's Delicate Condition (1964).

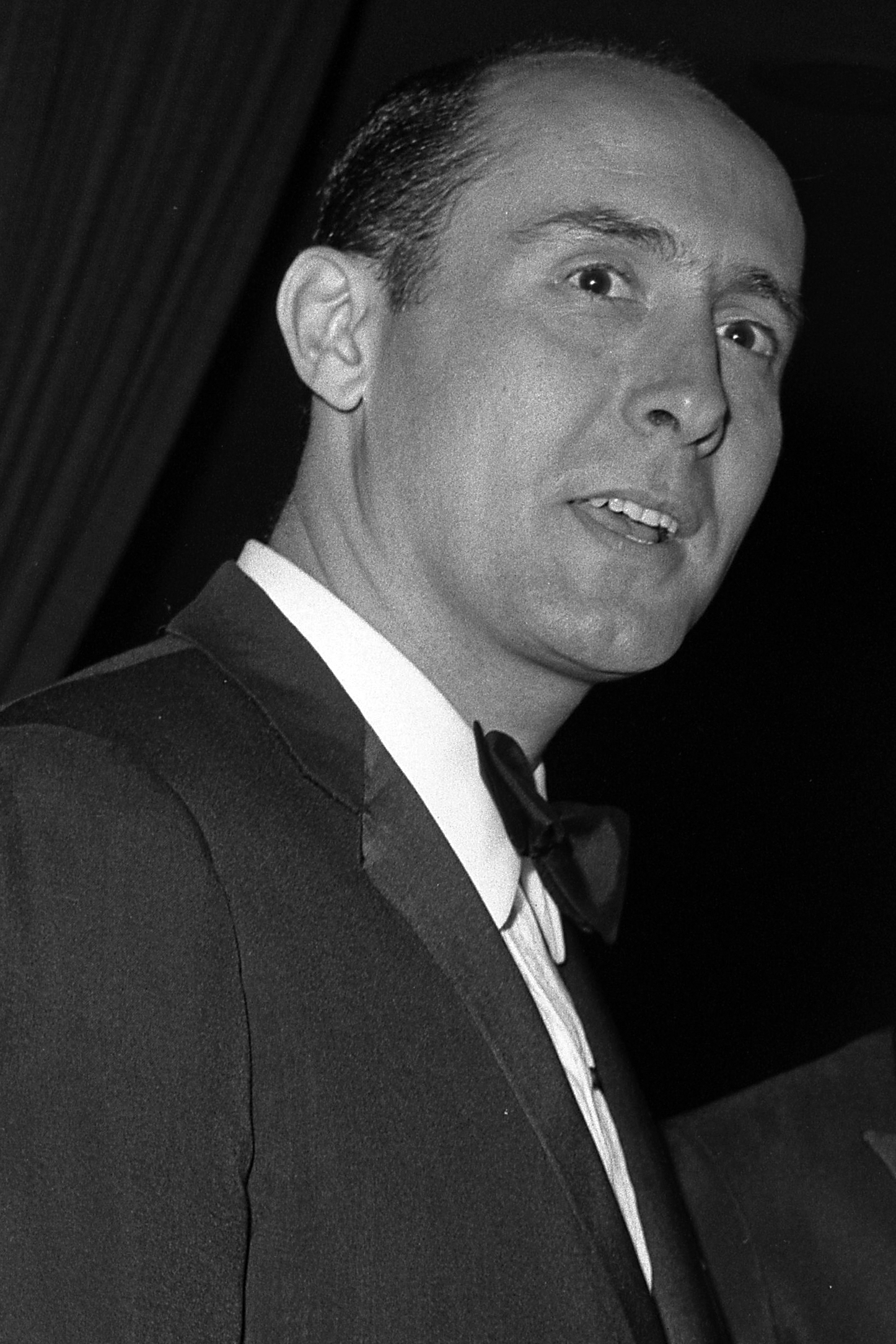
Henry Mancini won twice out of 11 nominations for "Moon River" from Breakfast at Tiffany's (1961) and "Days of Wine and Roses" from Days of Wine and Roses (1962).

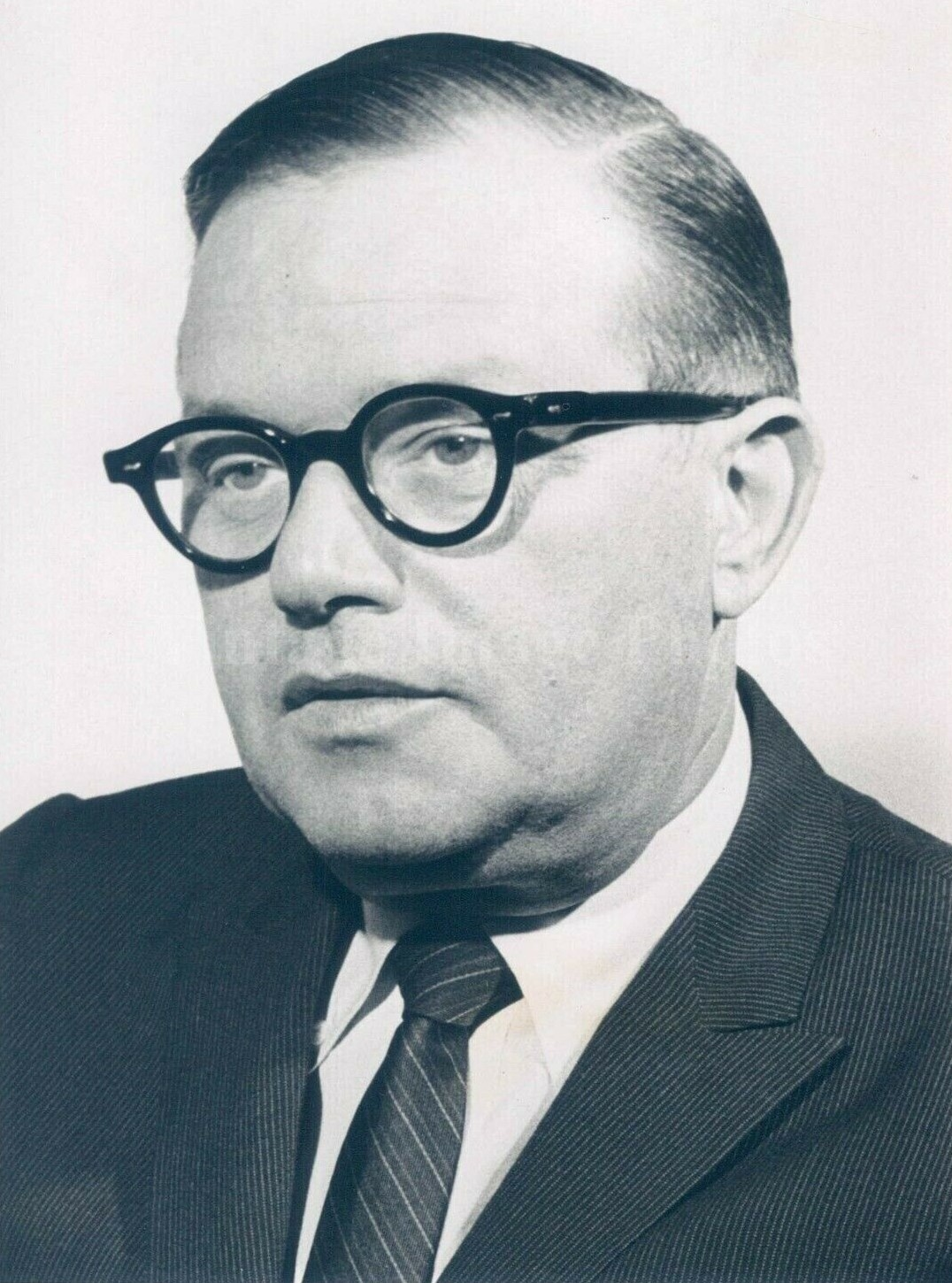
Jule Styne won for "Three Coins in the Fountain" from Three Coins in the Fountain (1954).

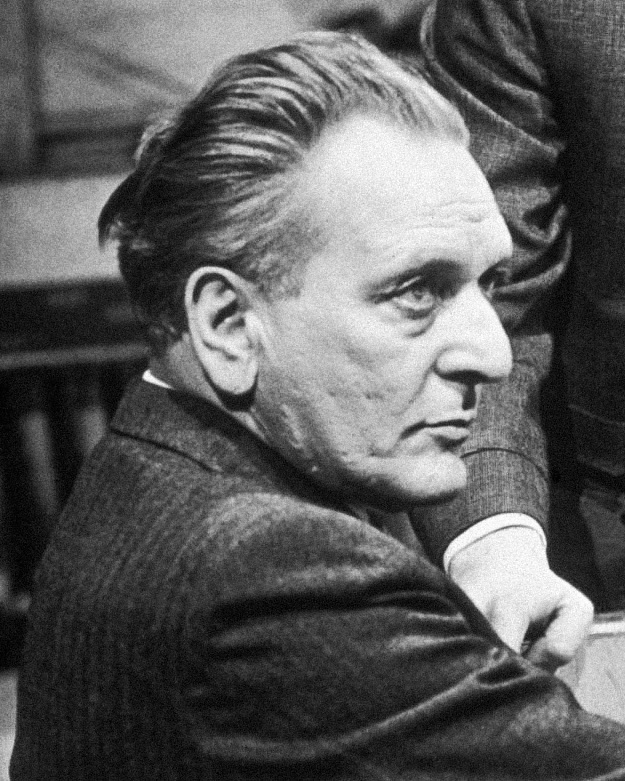
Frederick Loewe won for "Gigi" from Gigi (1958).

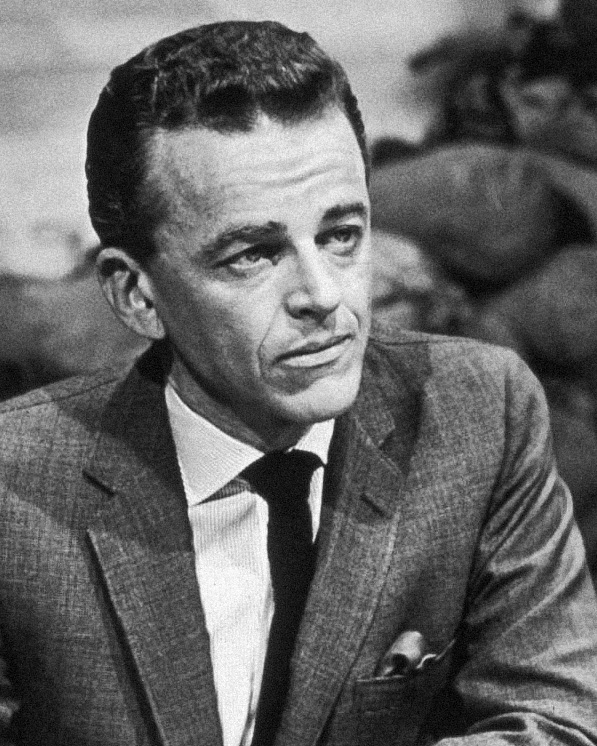
Alan Jay Lerner won for "Gigi" from Gigi (1958).

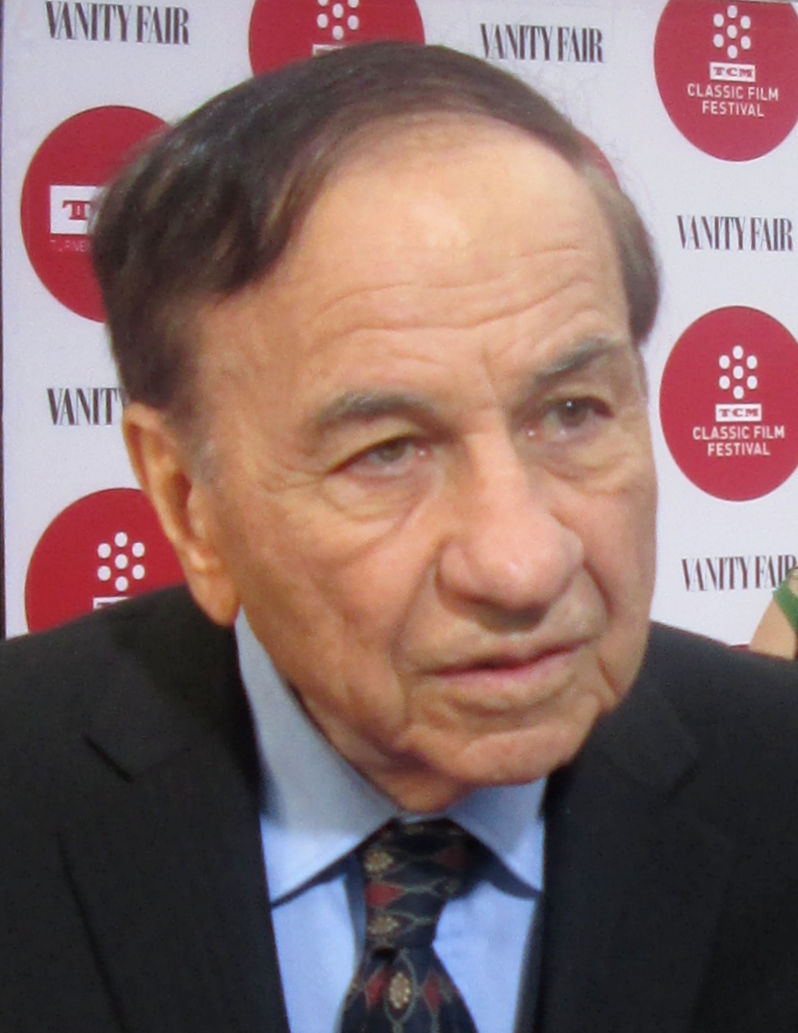
Richard M. Sherman won with his brother Robert B. Sherman for "Chim Chim Cher-ee" from Mary Poppins (1964).

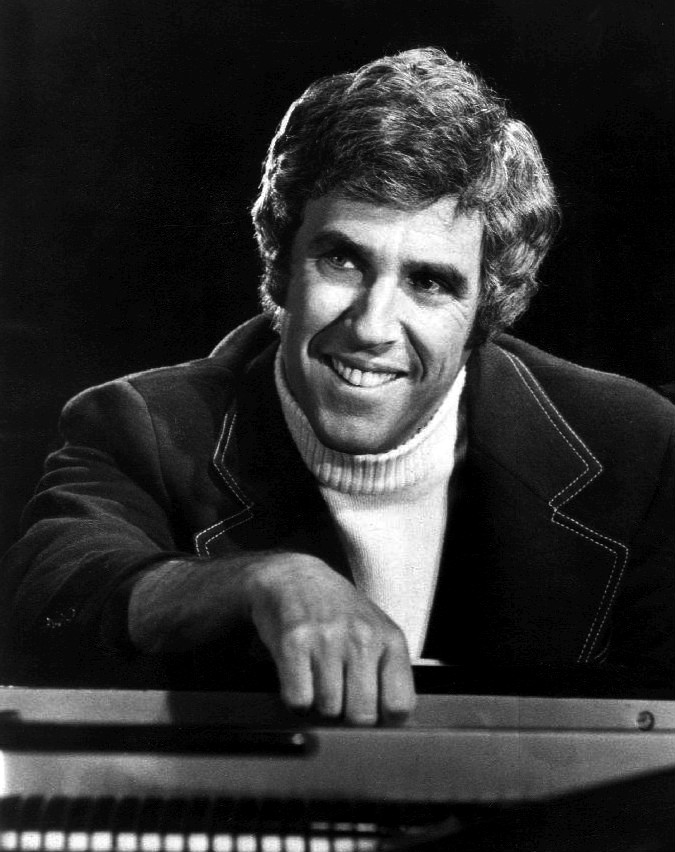
Burt Bacharach won for "Raindrops Keep Falling on My Head" from Butch Cassidy and the Sundance Kid (1969).

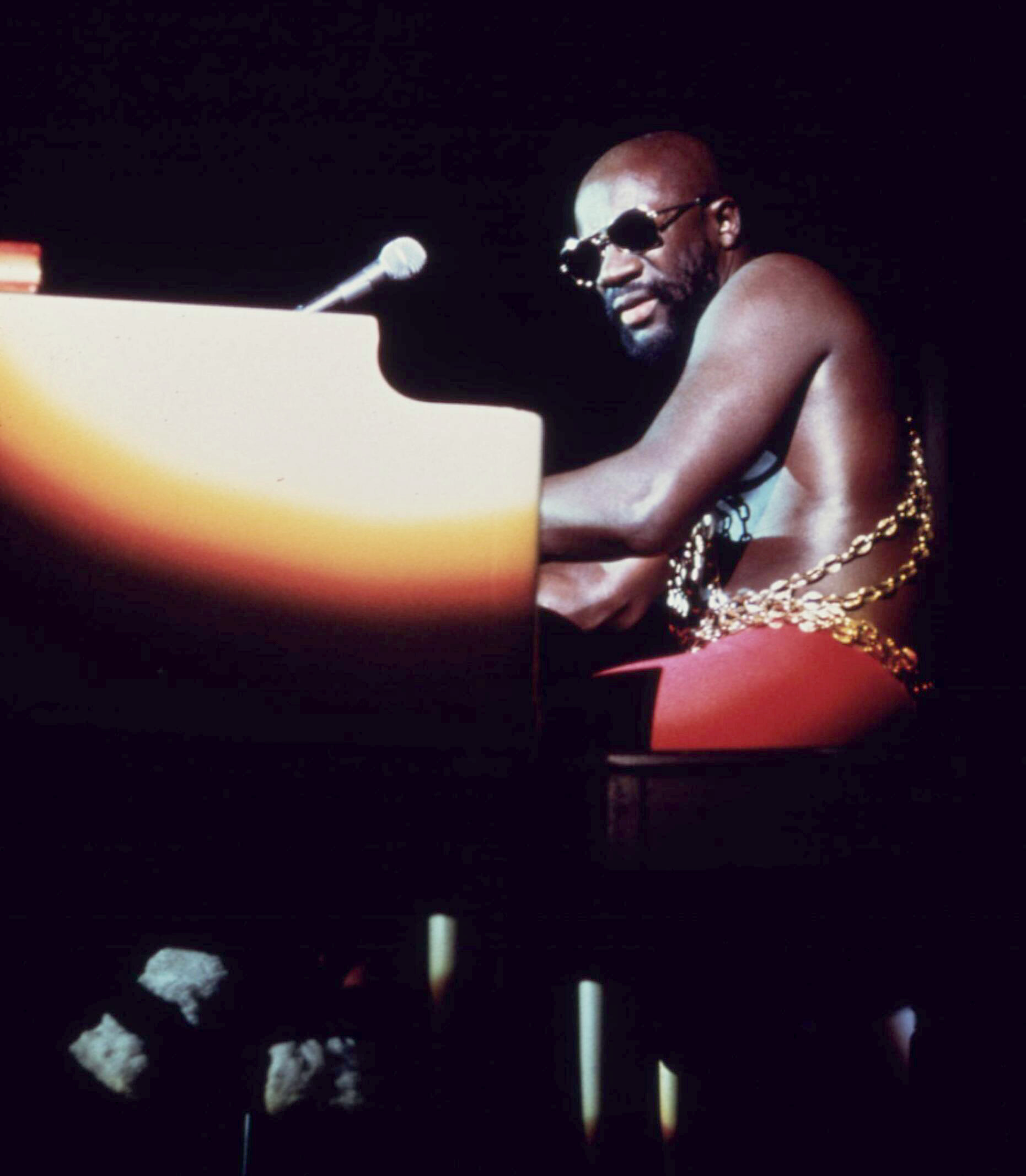
Isaac Hayes won for "Theme from Shaft" from Shaft (1971).

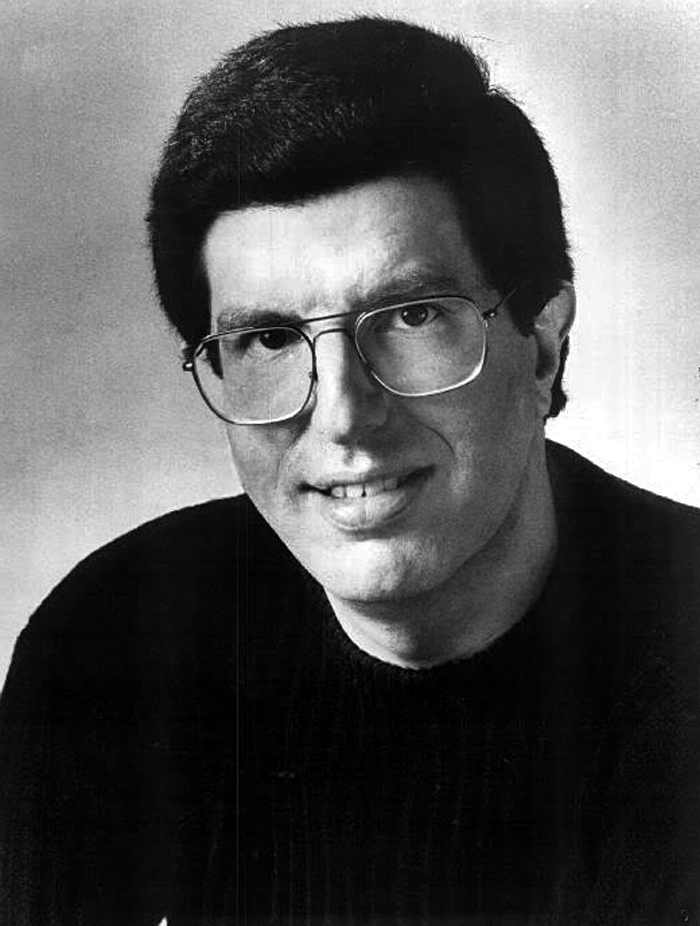
Marvin Hamlisch won for "The Way We Were" from The Way We Were (1973).

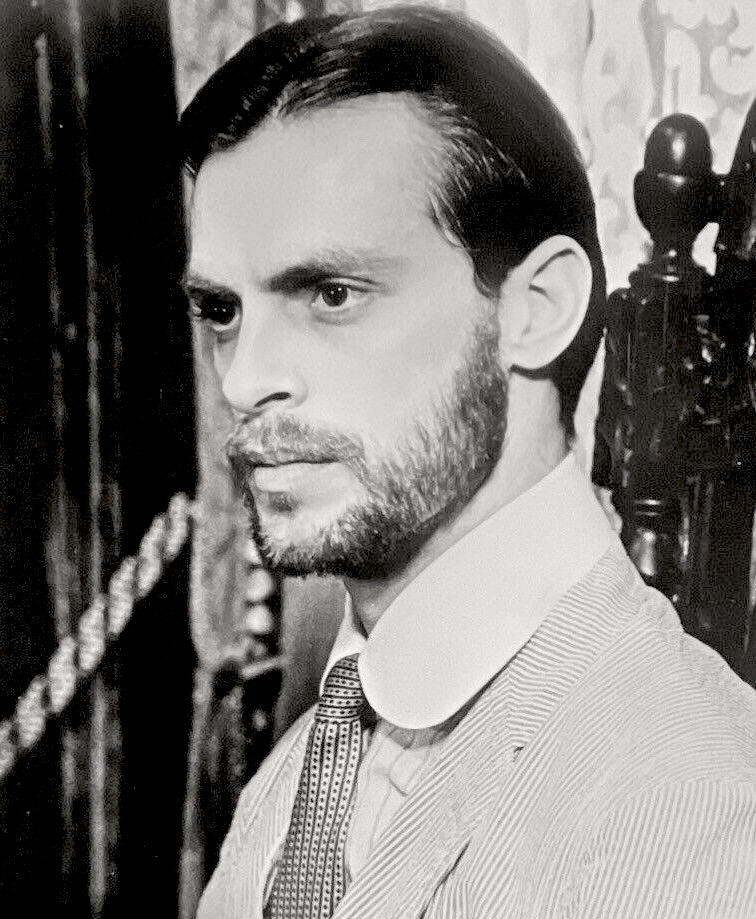
Keith Carradine won for "I'm Easy" from Nashville (1975).

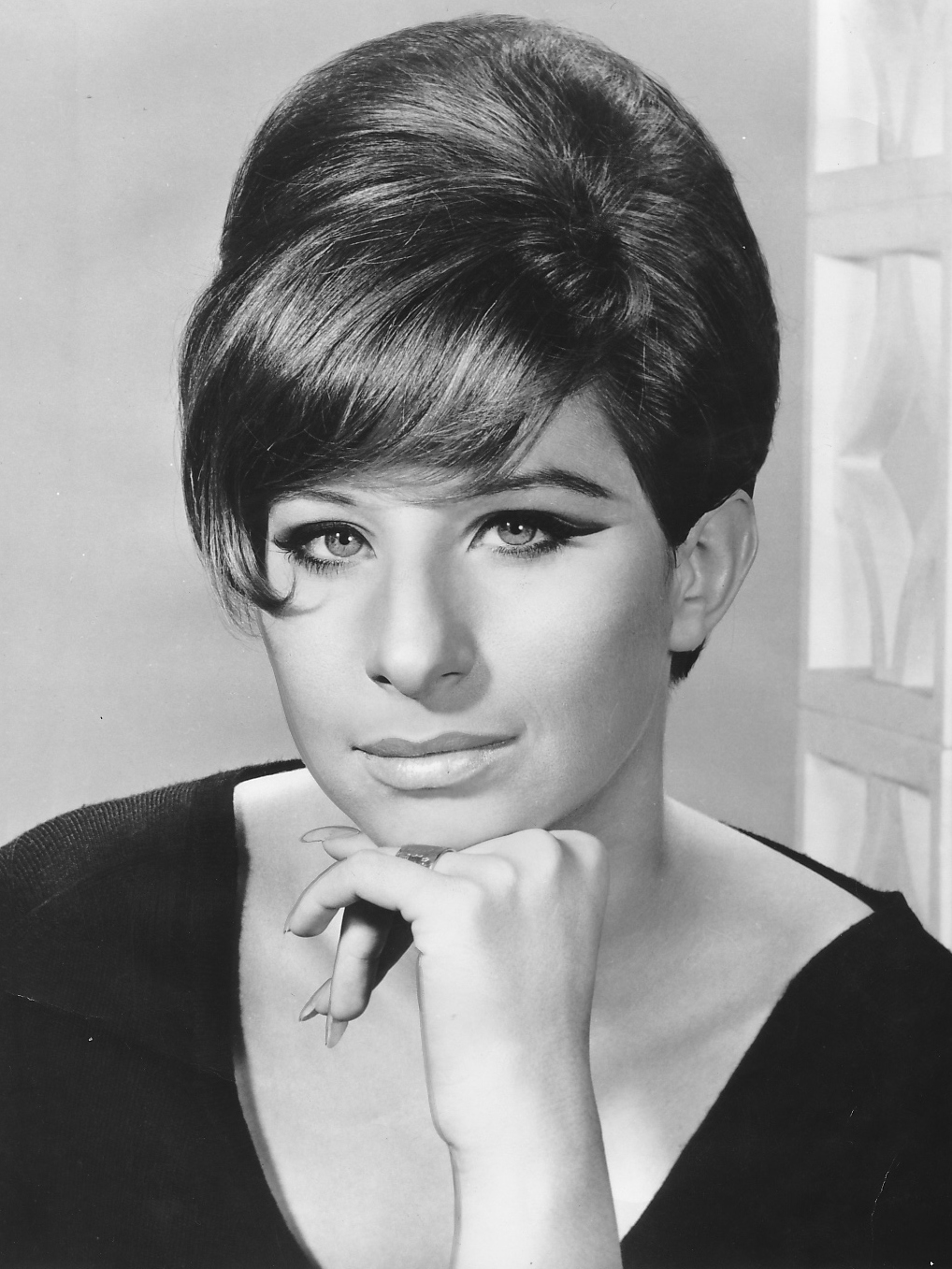
Barbra Streisand won for "Evergreen" from A Star is Born (1976).

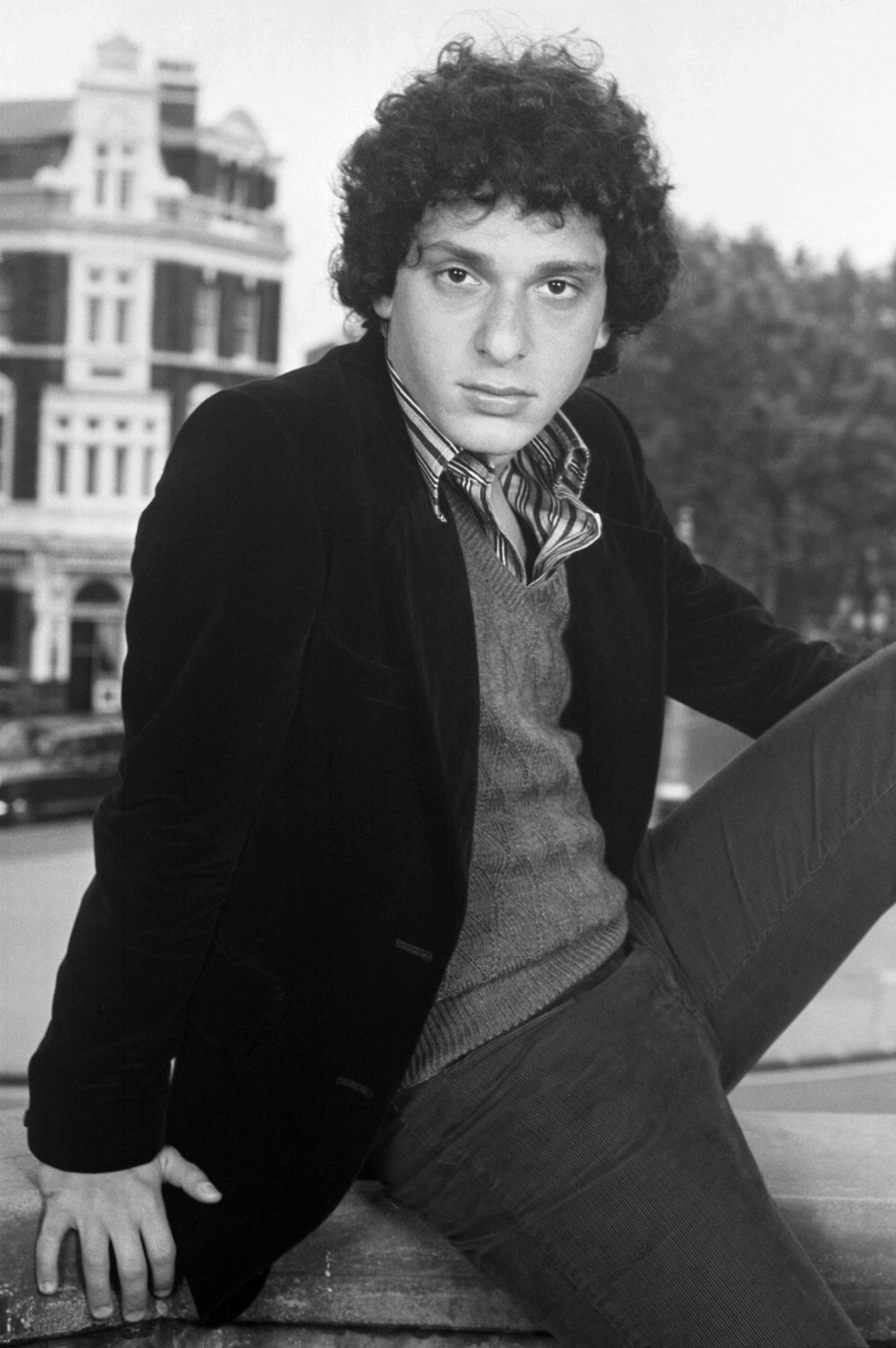
Paul Jabara won for "Last Dance" from Thank God It's Friday (1978).

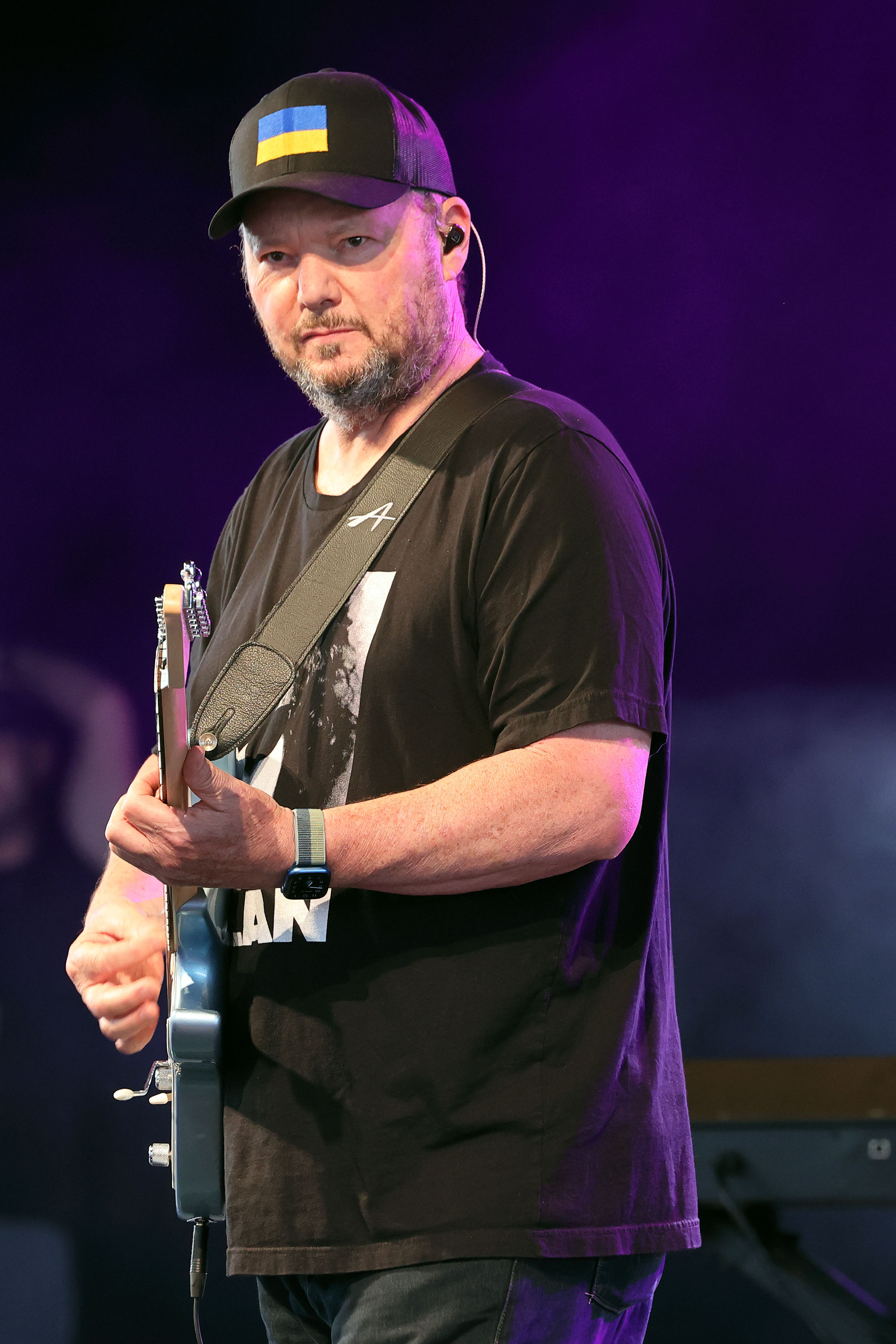
Christopher Cross won alongside Peter Allen, Burt Bacharach,and Carole Bayer Sager for "Arthur's Theme" from Arthur (1981).

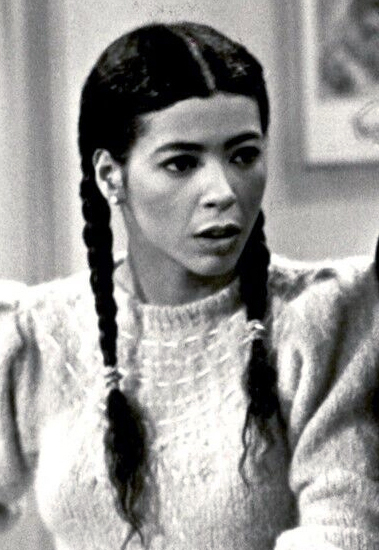
Irene Cara won alongside Giorgio Moroder and Keith Forsey for "Flashdance... What a Feeling" from Flashdance (1983).

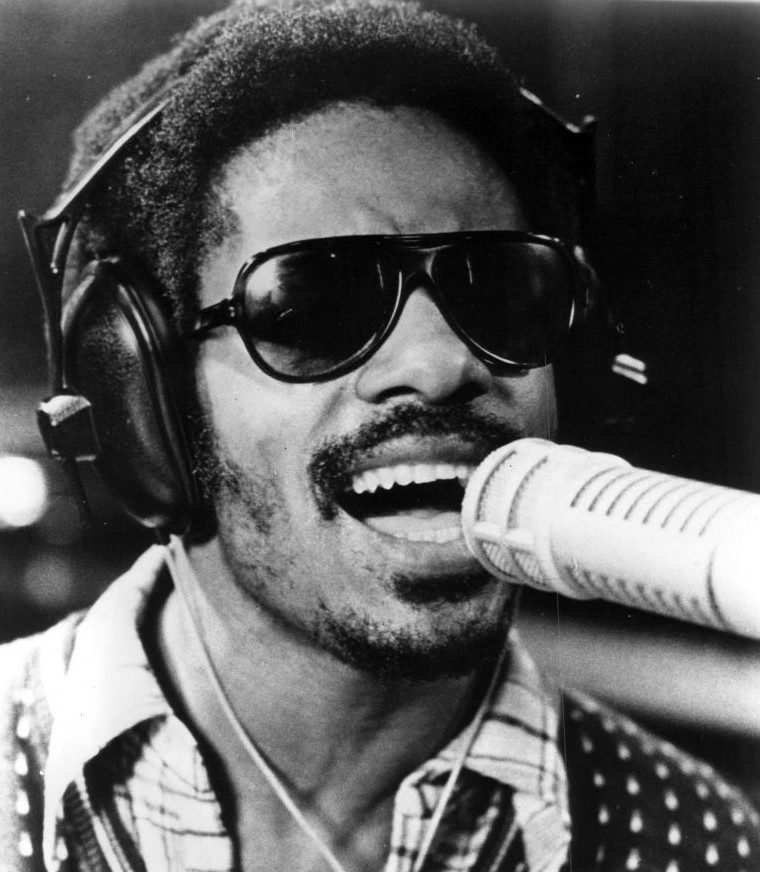
Stevie Wonder won for "I Just Called to Say I Love You" from The Woman in Red (1984).

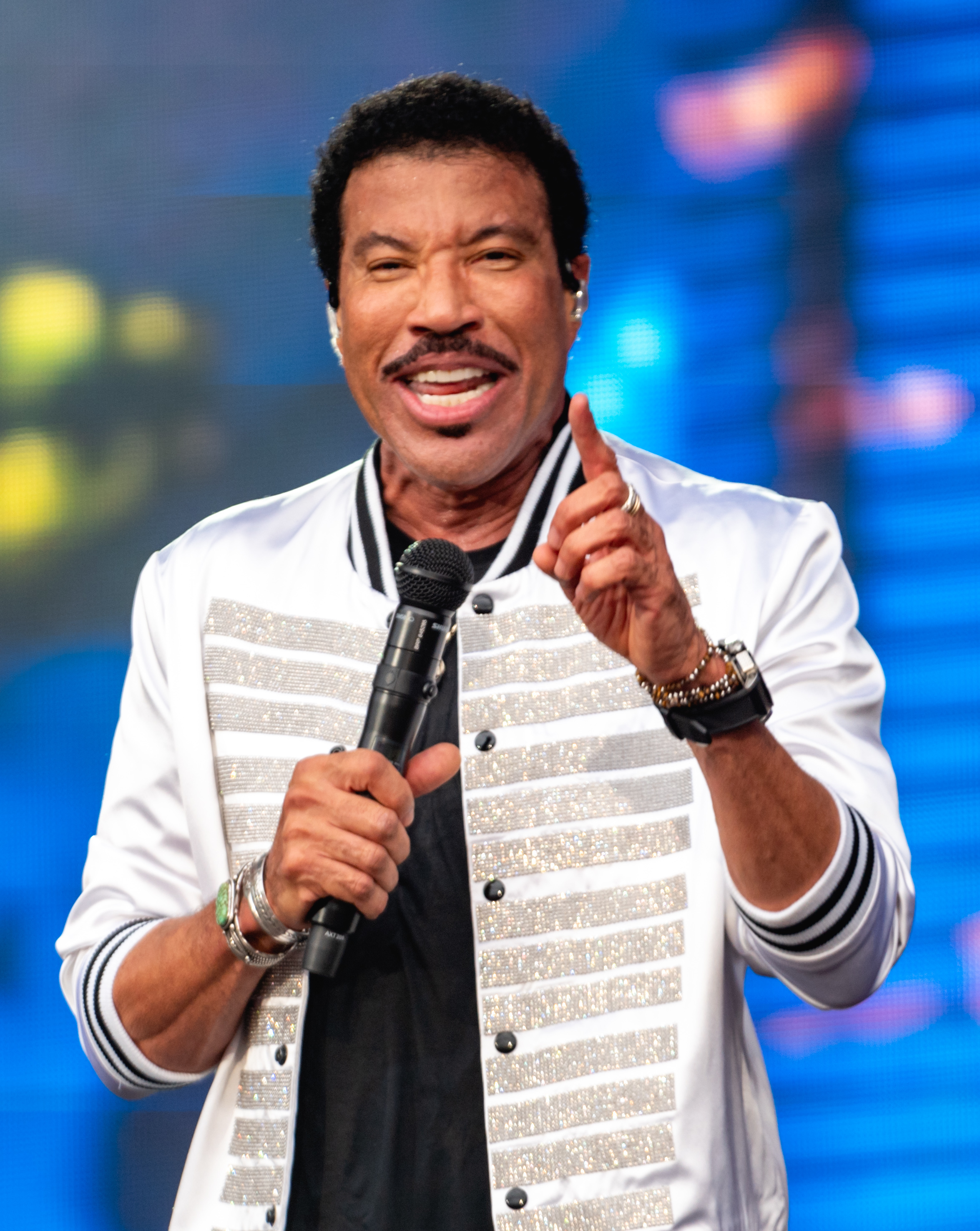
Lionel Richie won for "Say You, Say Me" from White Nights (1985).

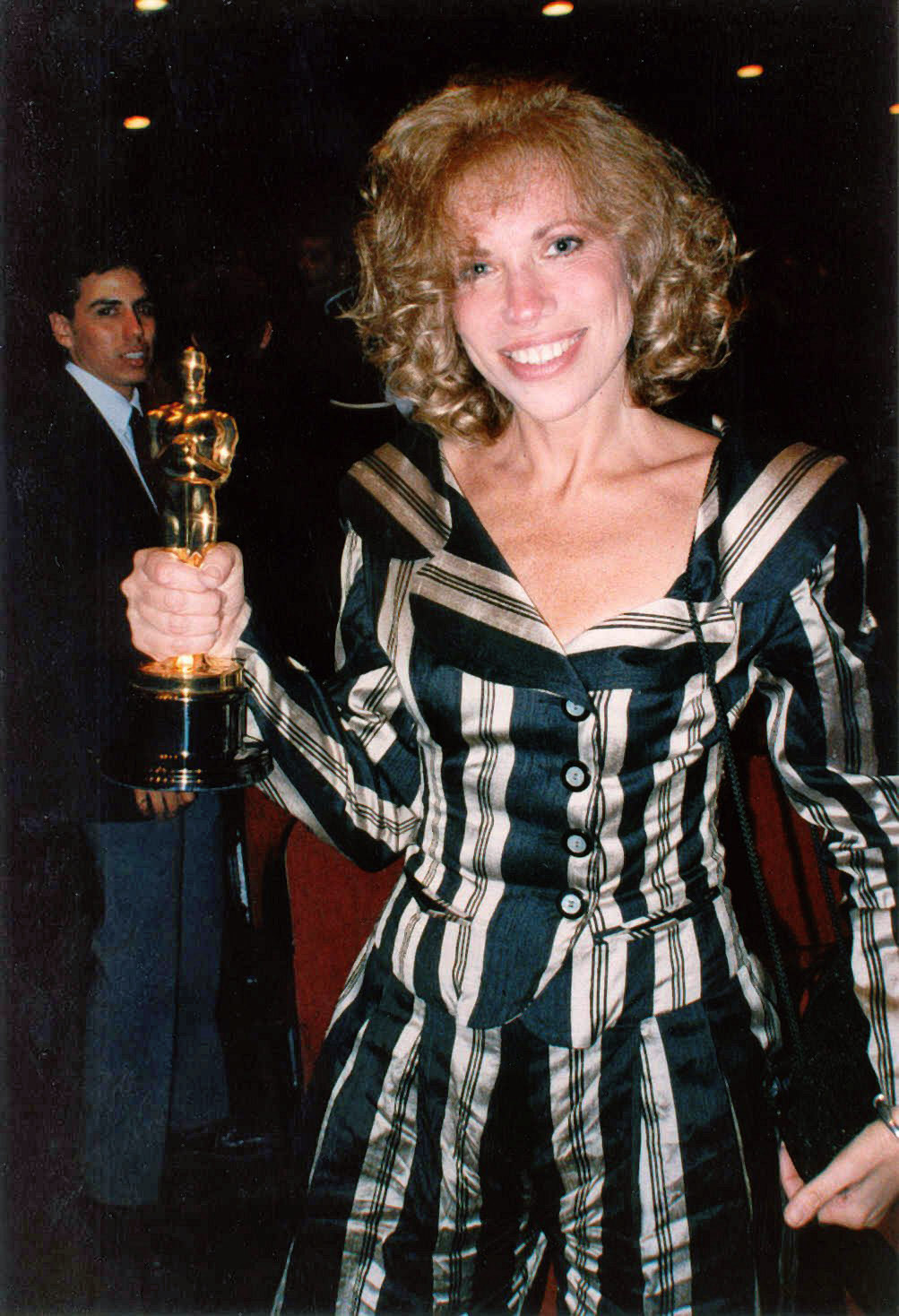
Carly Simon won for "Let the River Run" from Working Girl (1988).

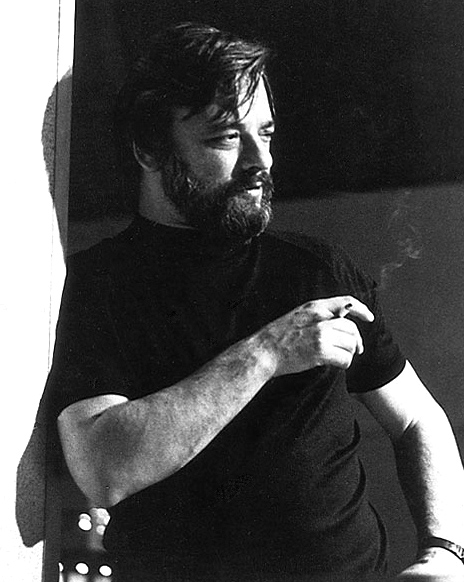
Stephen Sondheim won for "Sooner or Later" from Dick Tracy (1990).

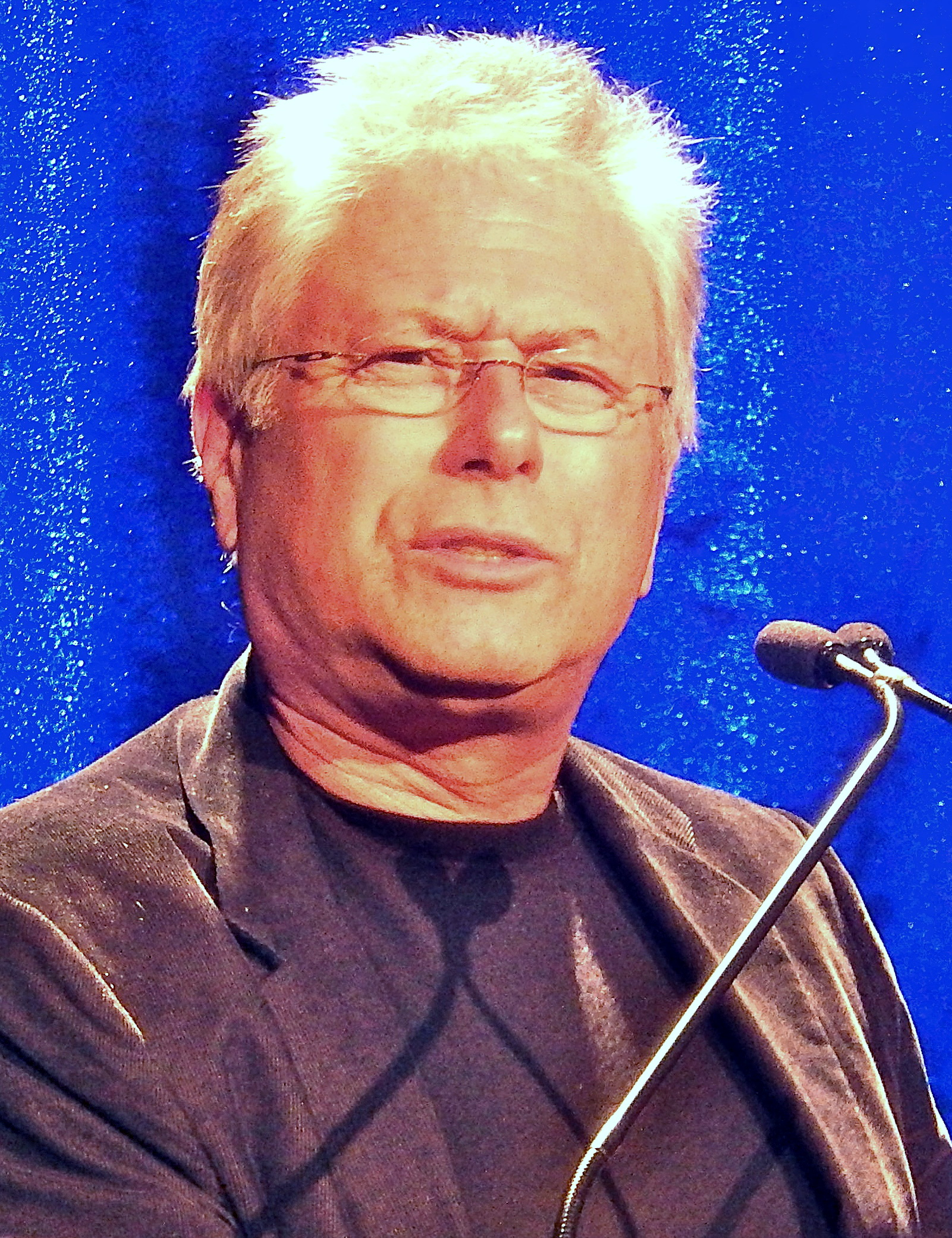
Alan Menken won four times for "Under the Sea" from The Little Mermaid (1989), "Beauty and the Beast" from Beauty and the Beast (1991), "A Whole New World" from Aladdin (1992) and "Colors of the Wind" from Pocahontas (1995).

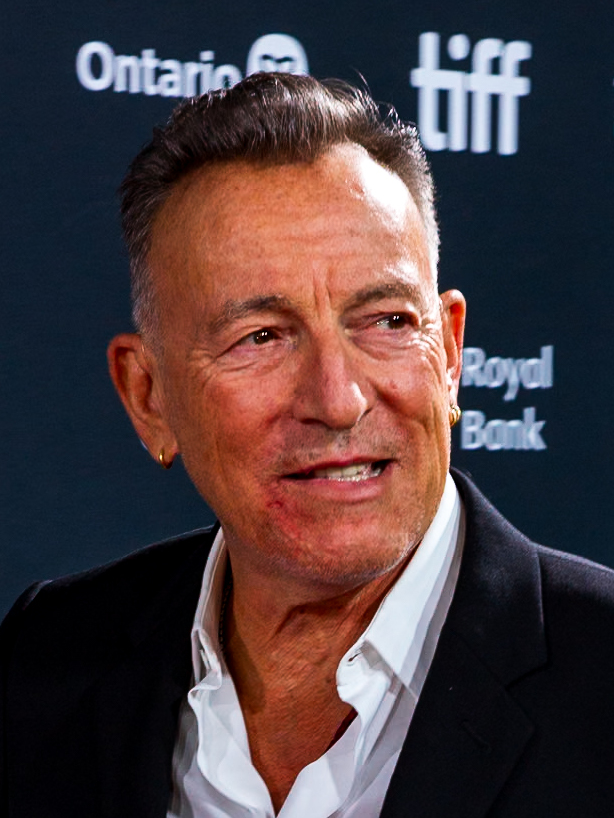
Bruce Springsteen won for "Streets of Philadelphia" from Philadelphia (1993).

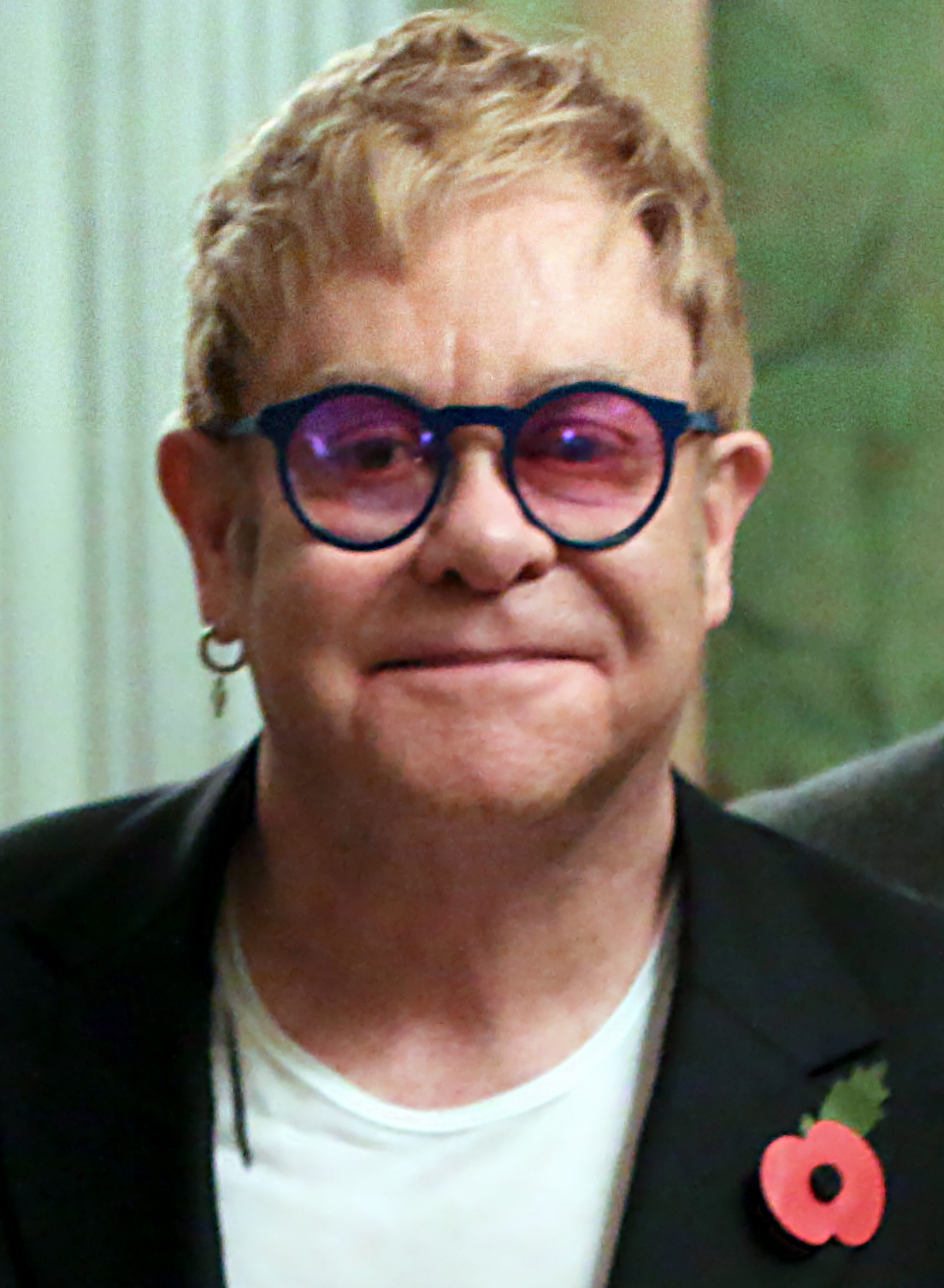
Sir Elton John won twice for "Can You Feel the Love Tonight" from The Lion King (1994) and "(I'm Gonna) Love Me Again" from Rocketman (2019).

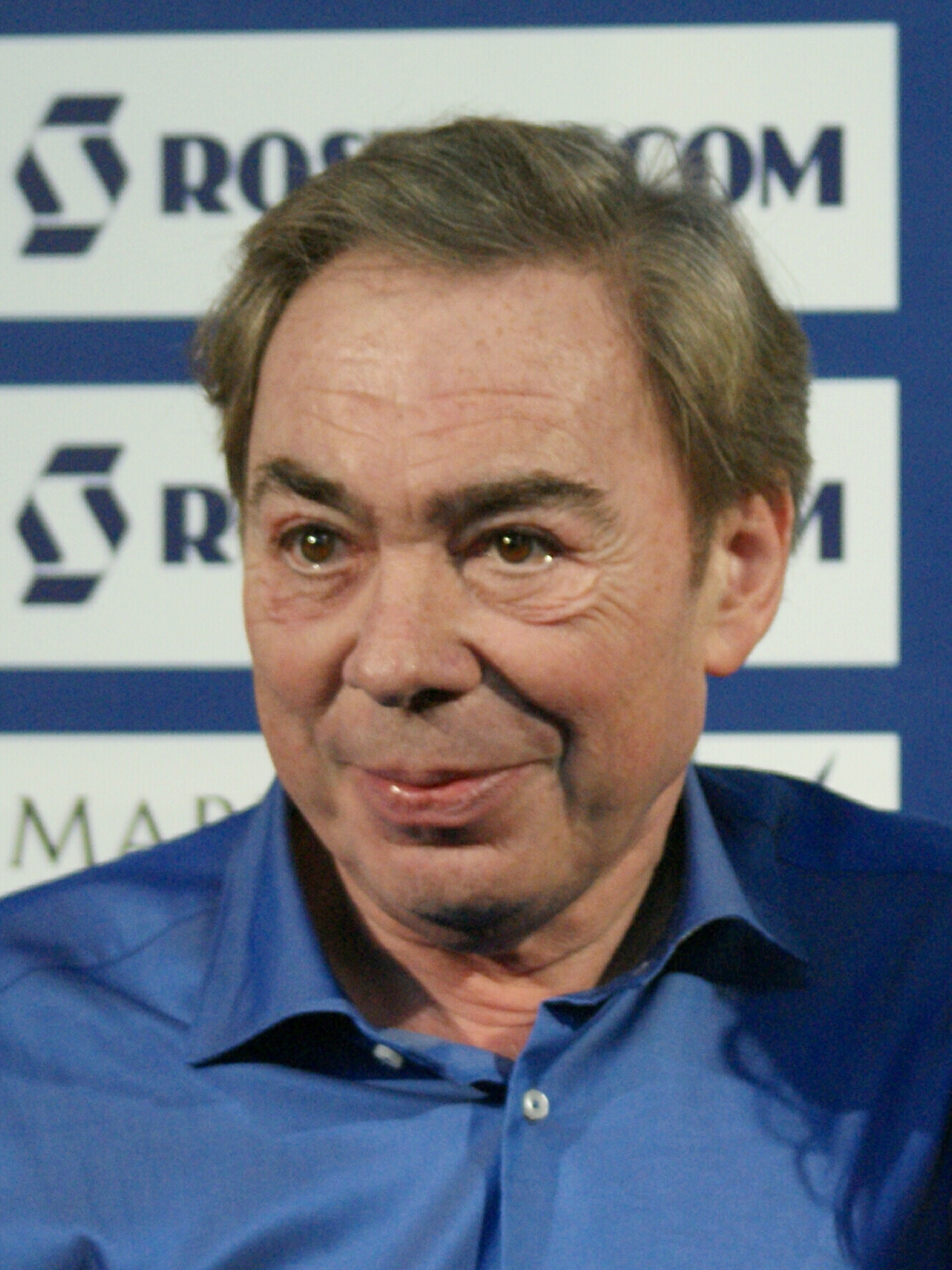
Andrew Lloyd Webber won for "You Must Love Me" from Evita (1996).

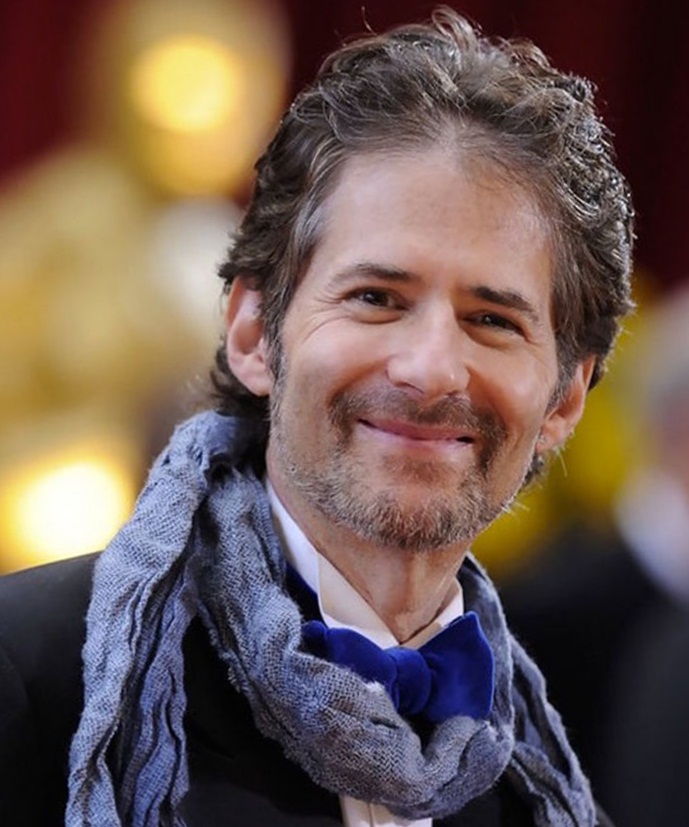
James Horner won for "My Heart Will Go On" from Titanic (1997).

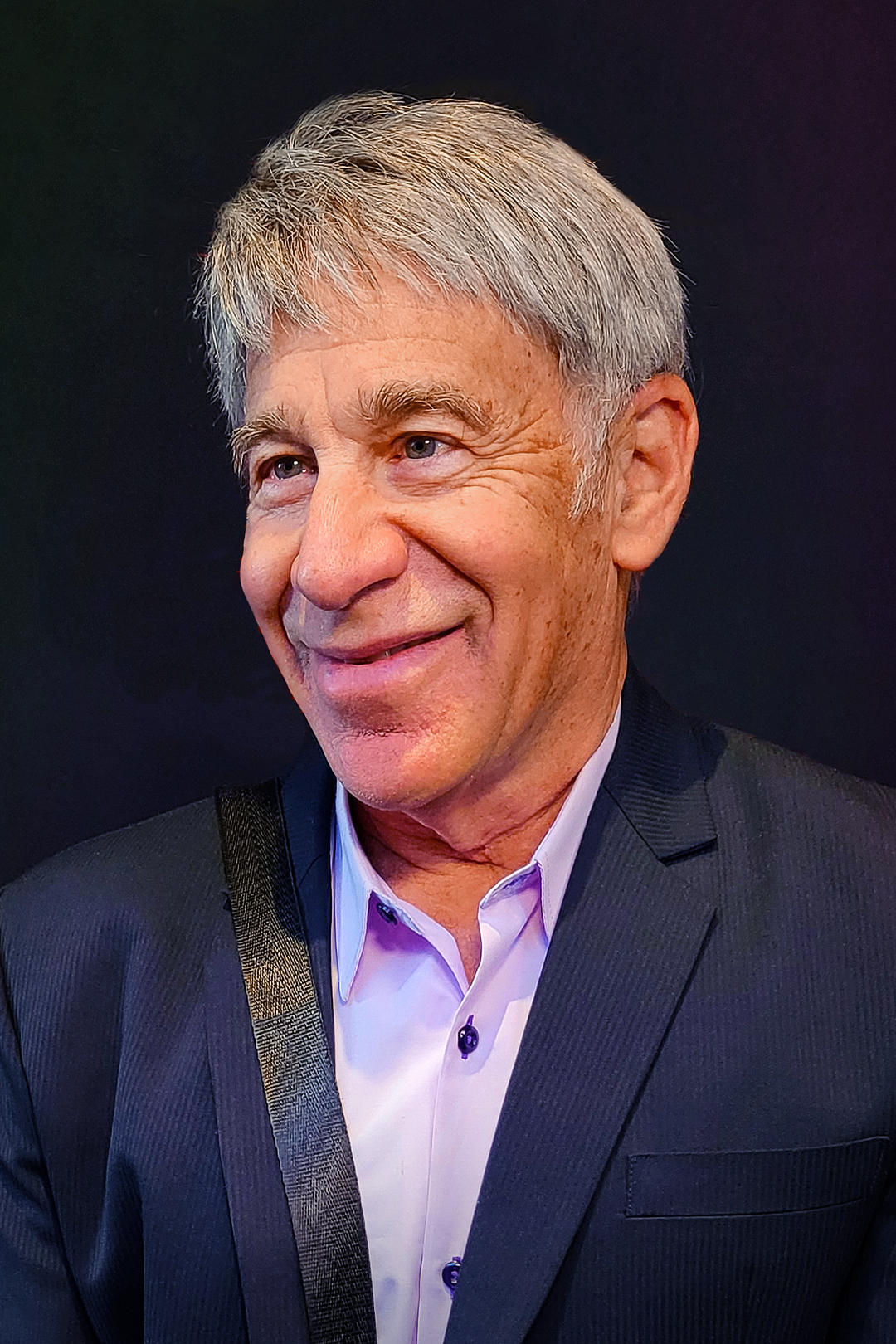
Stephen Schwartz won for "When You Believe" from The Prince of Egypt (1998).

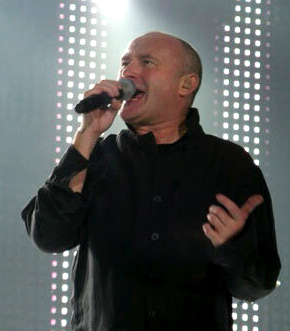
Phil Collins won for "You'll Be in My Heart" from Tarzan (1999).

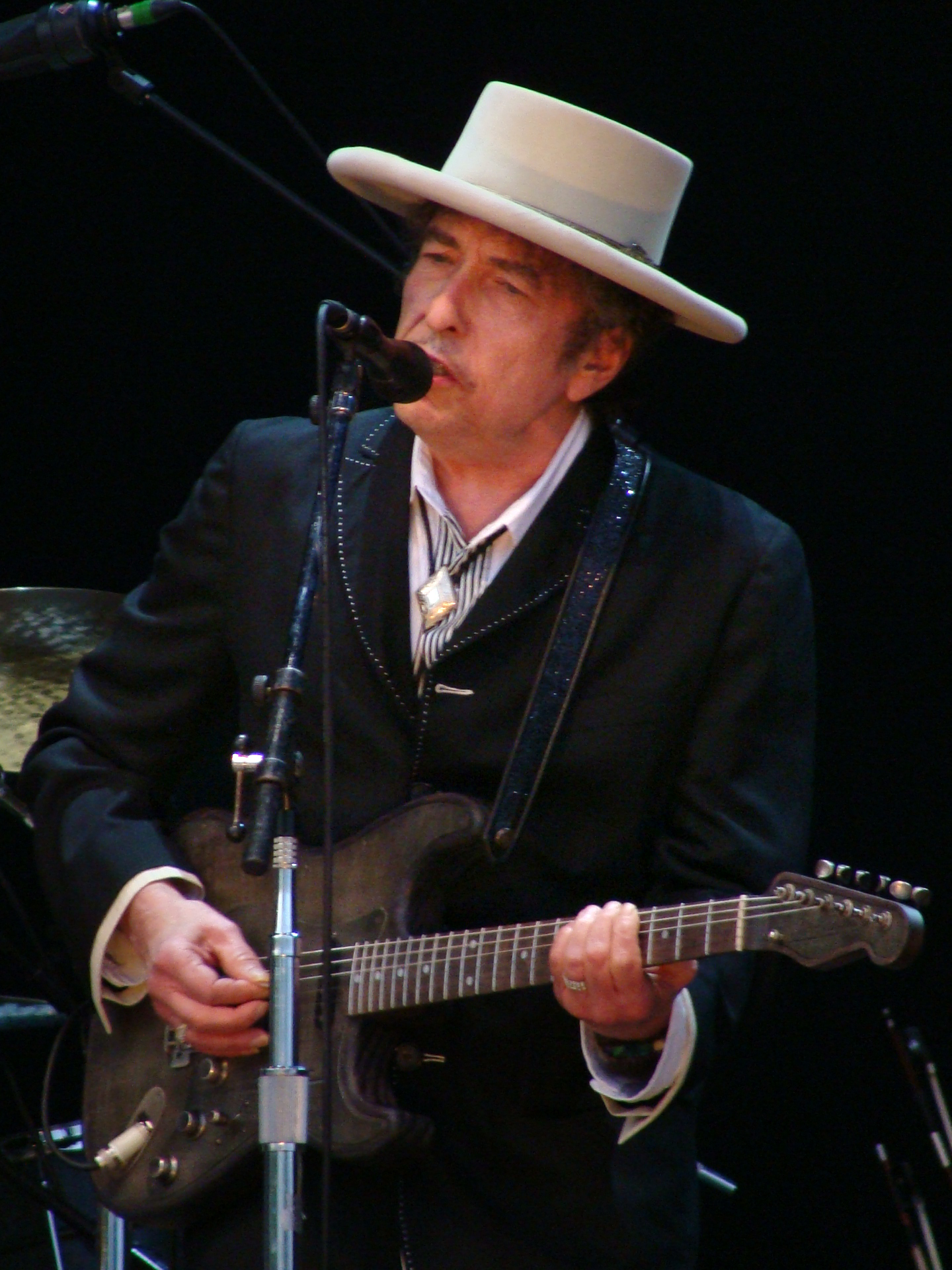
Bob Dylan won for "Things Have Changed" from Wonder Boys (2000).

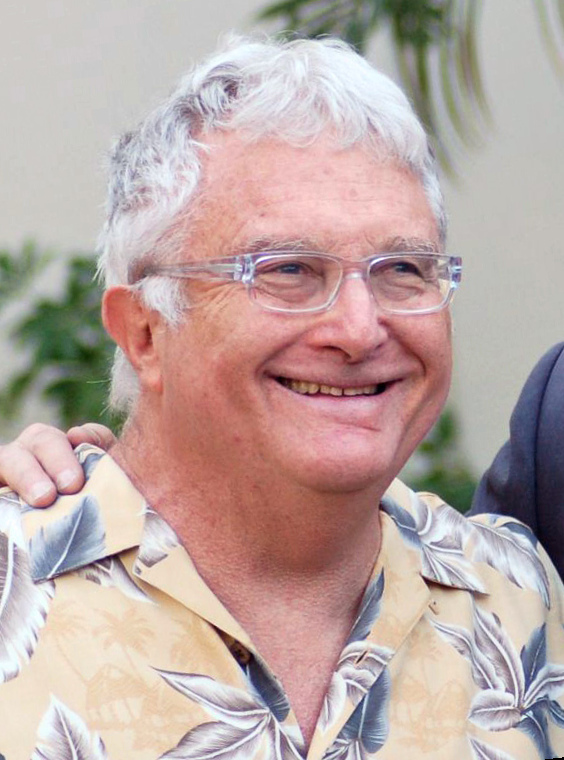
Randy Newman won twice for "If I Didn't Have You" from Monsters, Inc. (2001) and We Belong Together from Toy Story 3 (2010).

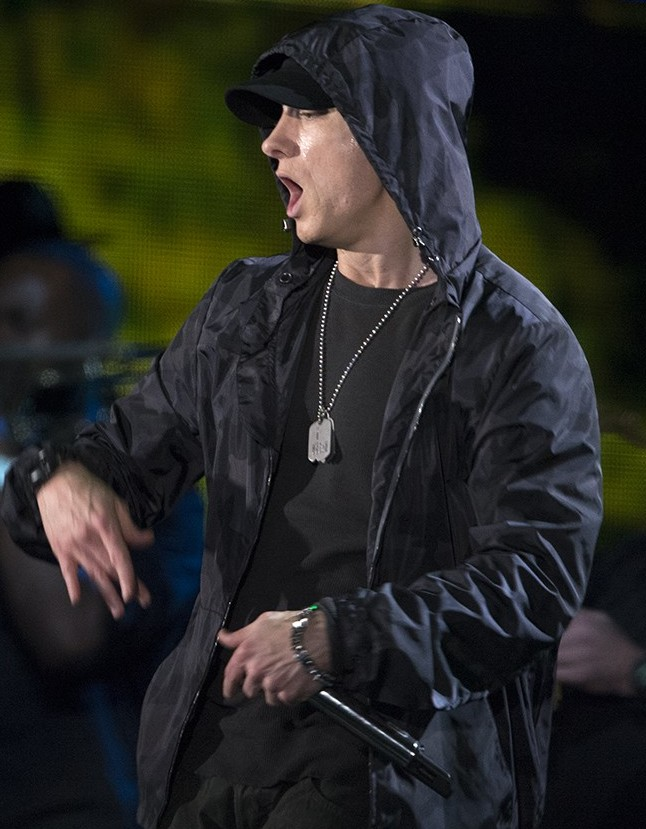
Eminem won for "Lose Yourself" from 8 Mile (2002).

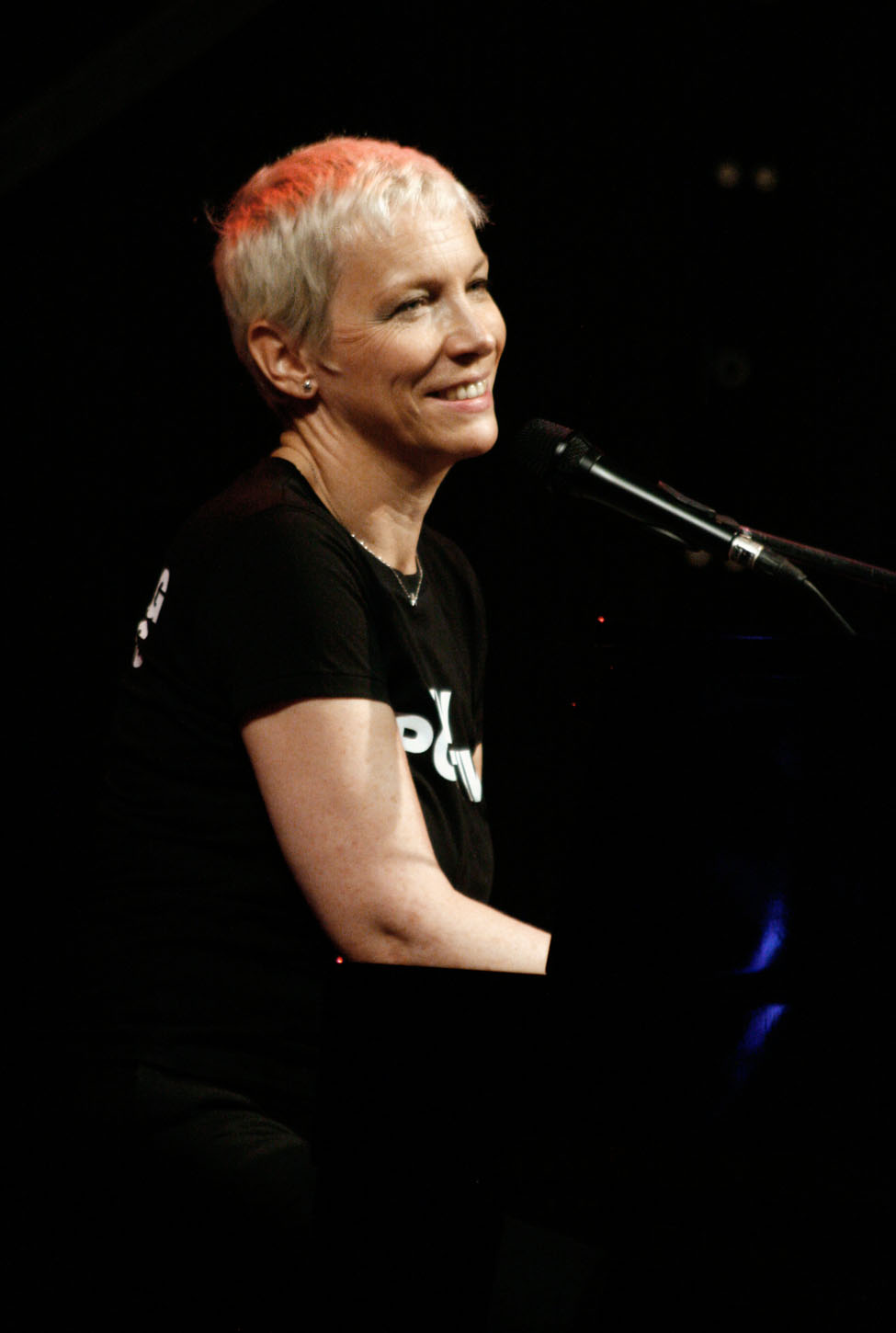
Annie Lennox won for "Into the West" from The Lord of the Rings: The Return of the King (2003).

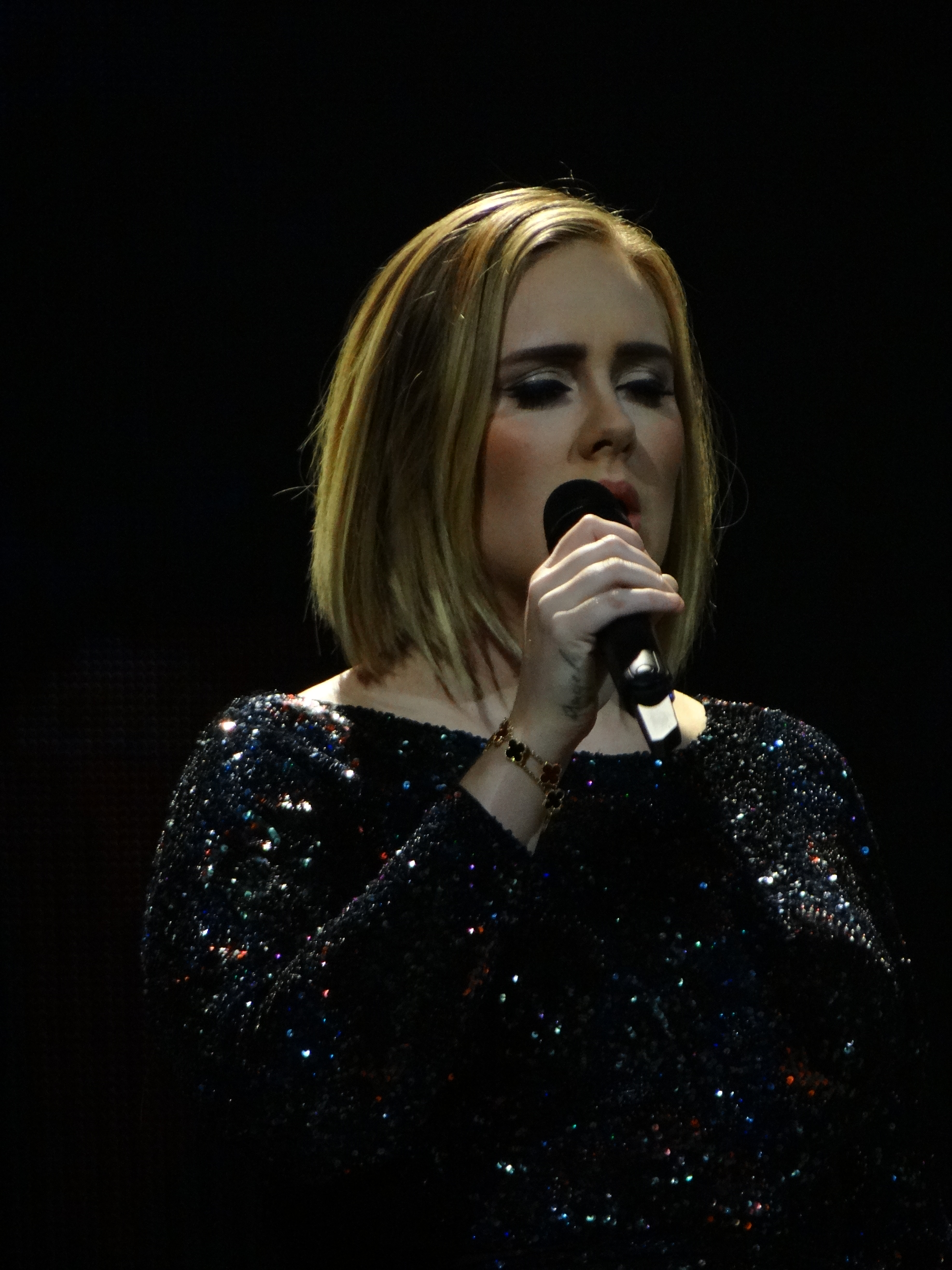
Adele won for "Skyfall" from Skyfall (2012).

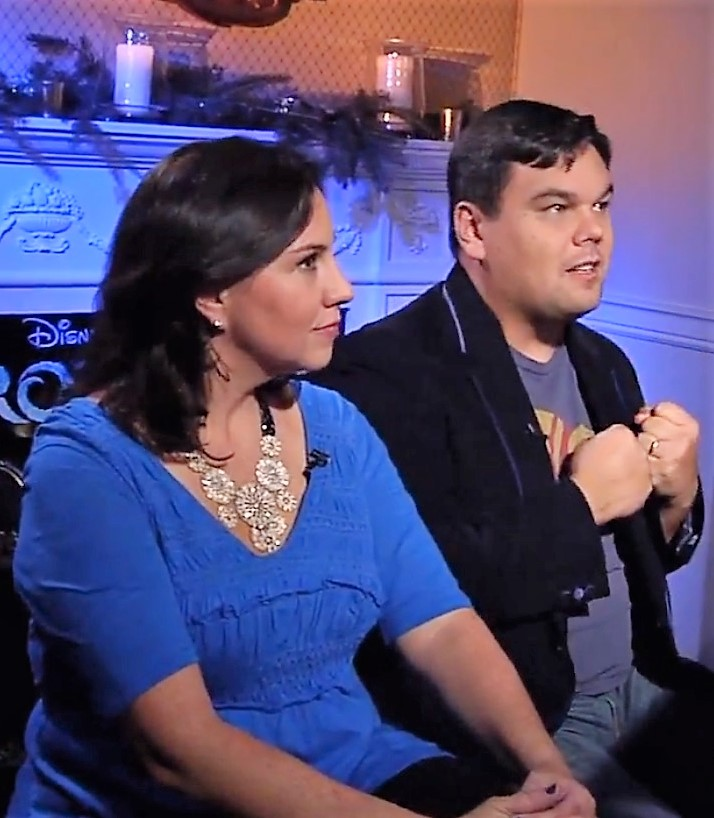
Kristen Anderson-Lopez and Robert Lopez won twice for "Let It Go" from Frozen (2013) and "Remember Me" from Coco (2017).

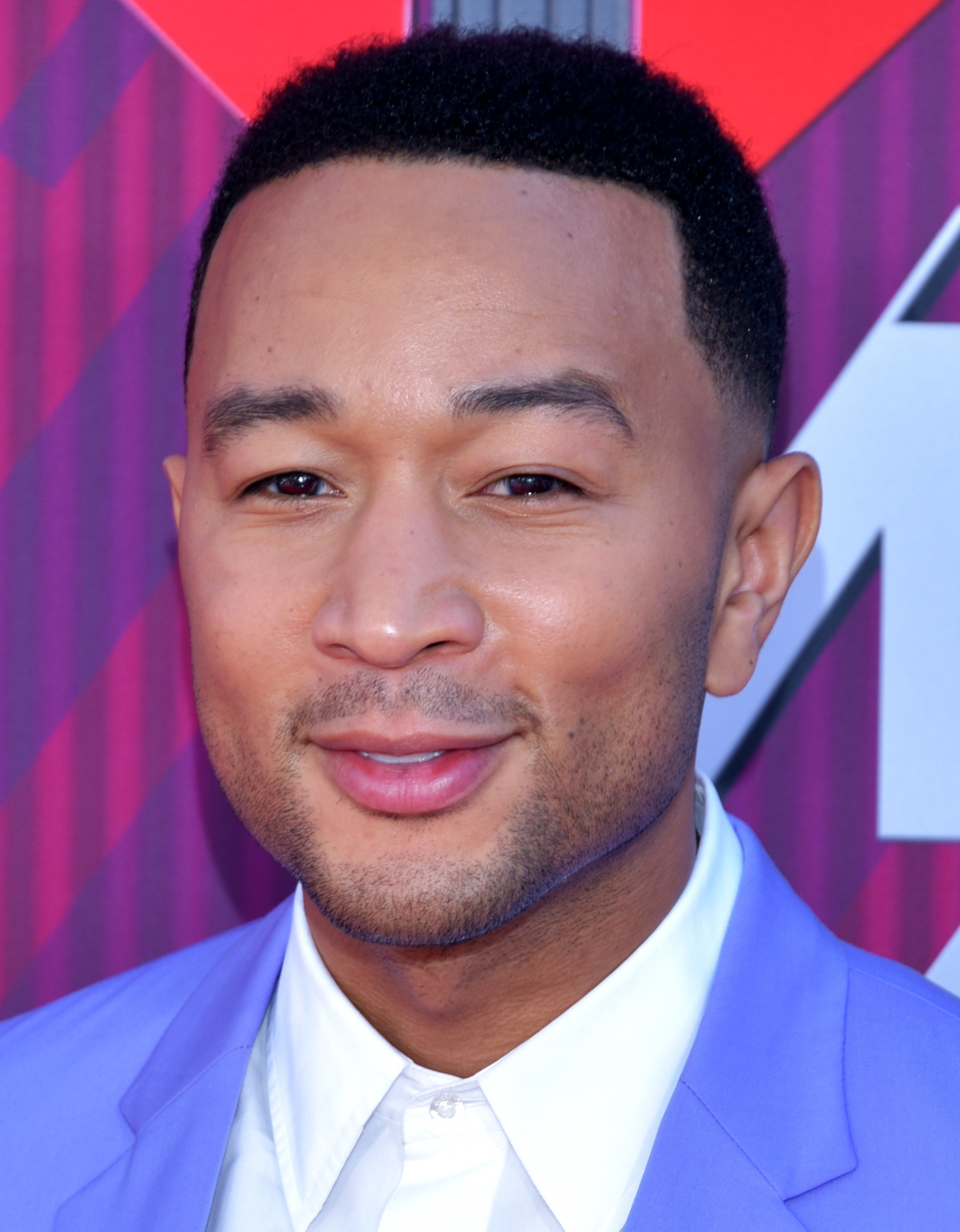
John Legend won alongside Common for "Glory" from Selma (2014).

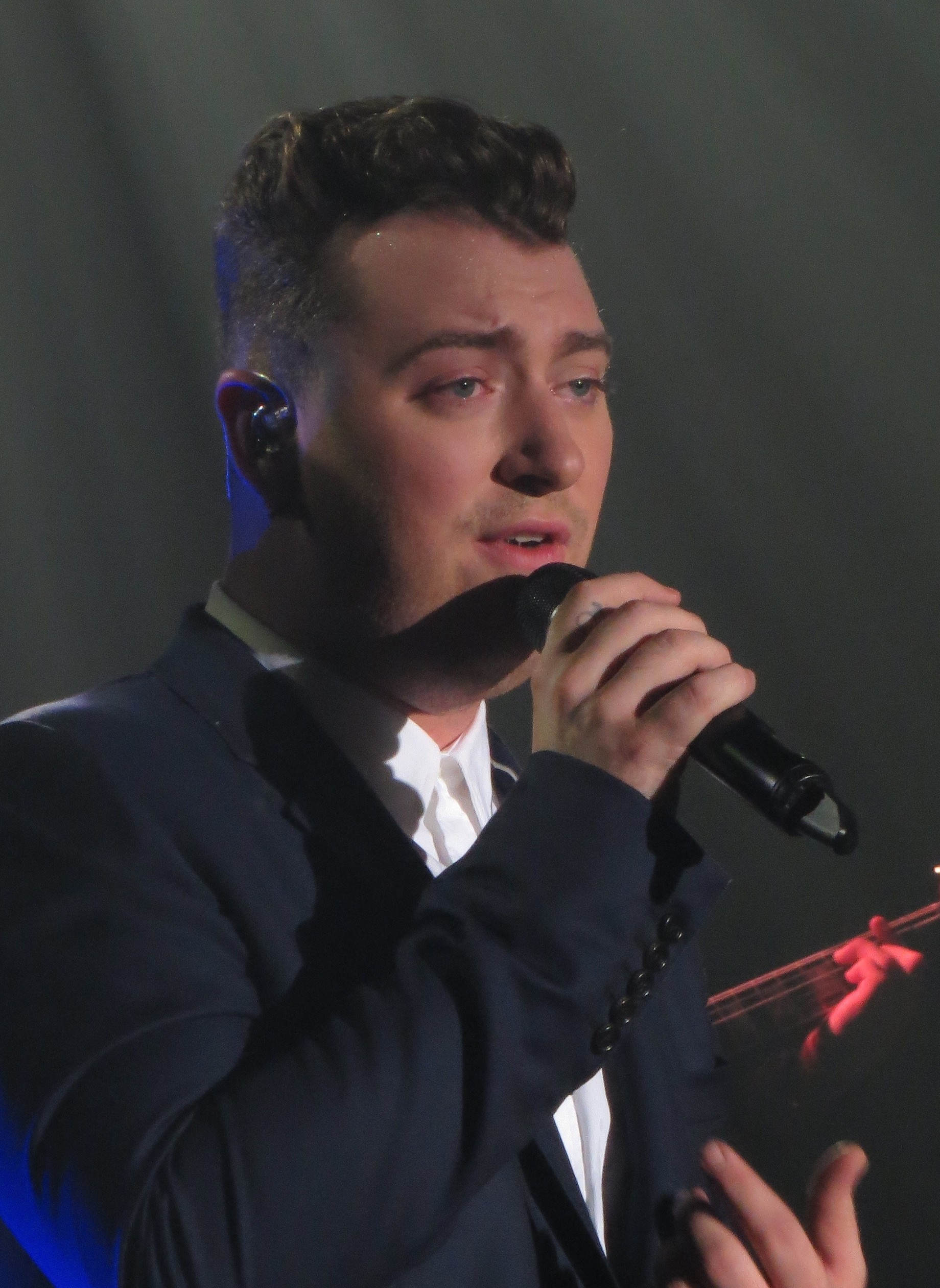
Sam Smith won for "Writing's on the Wall" from Spectre (2015).

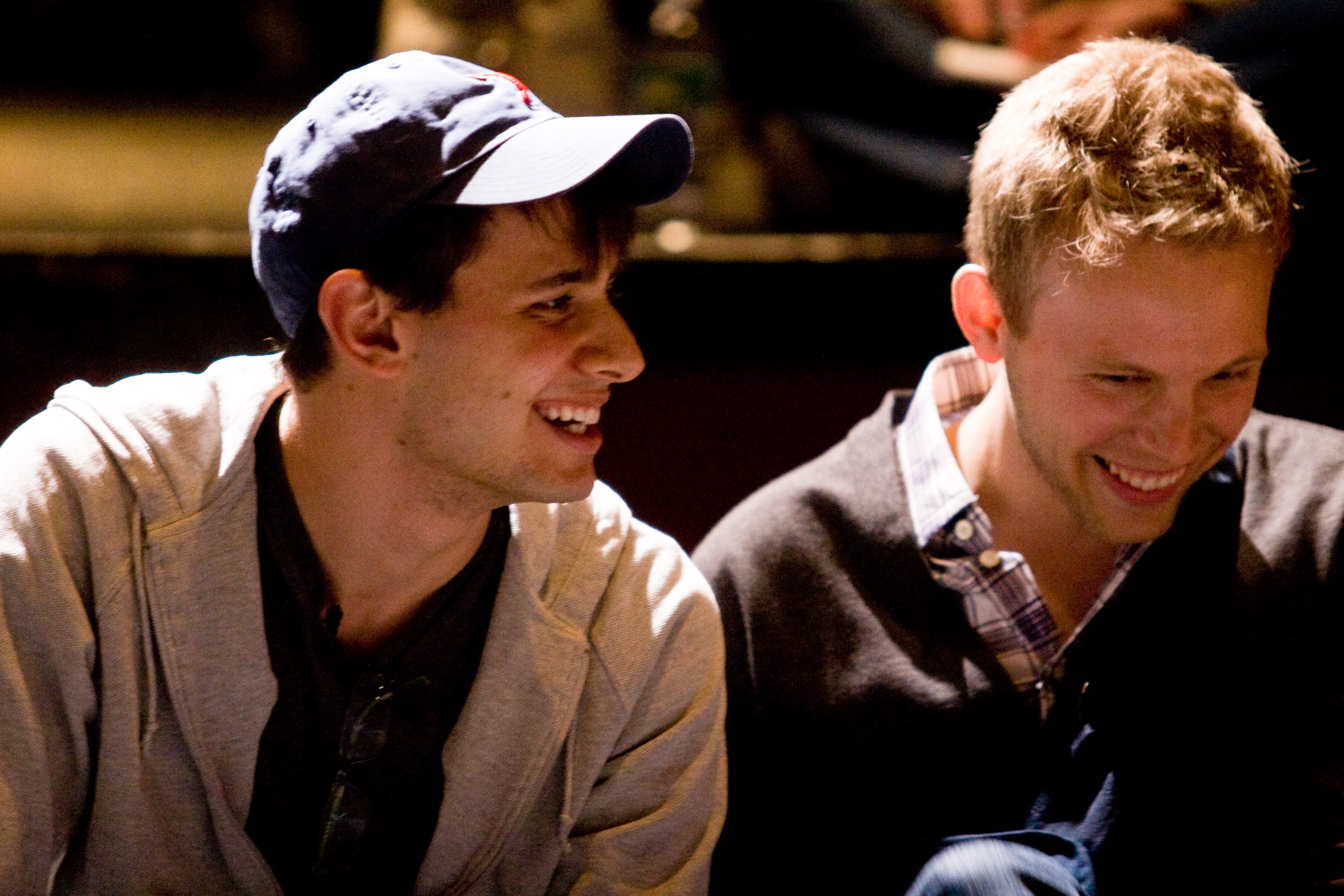
Benj Pasek and Justin Paul won alongside Justin Hurwitz for "City of Stars" from La La Land (2016).

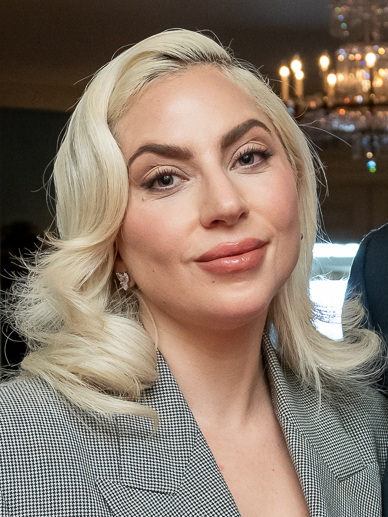
Lady Gaga won alongside Mark Ronson, Anthony Rossomando & Andrew Wyatt for "Shallow" from A Star Is Born (2018).

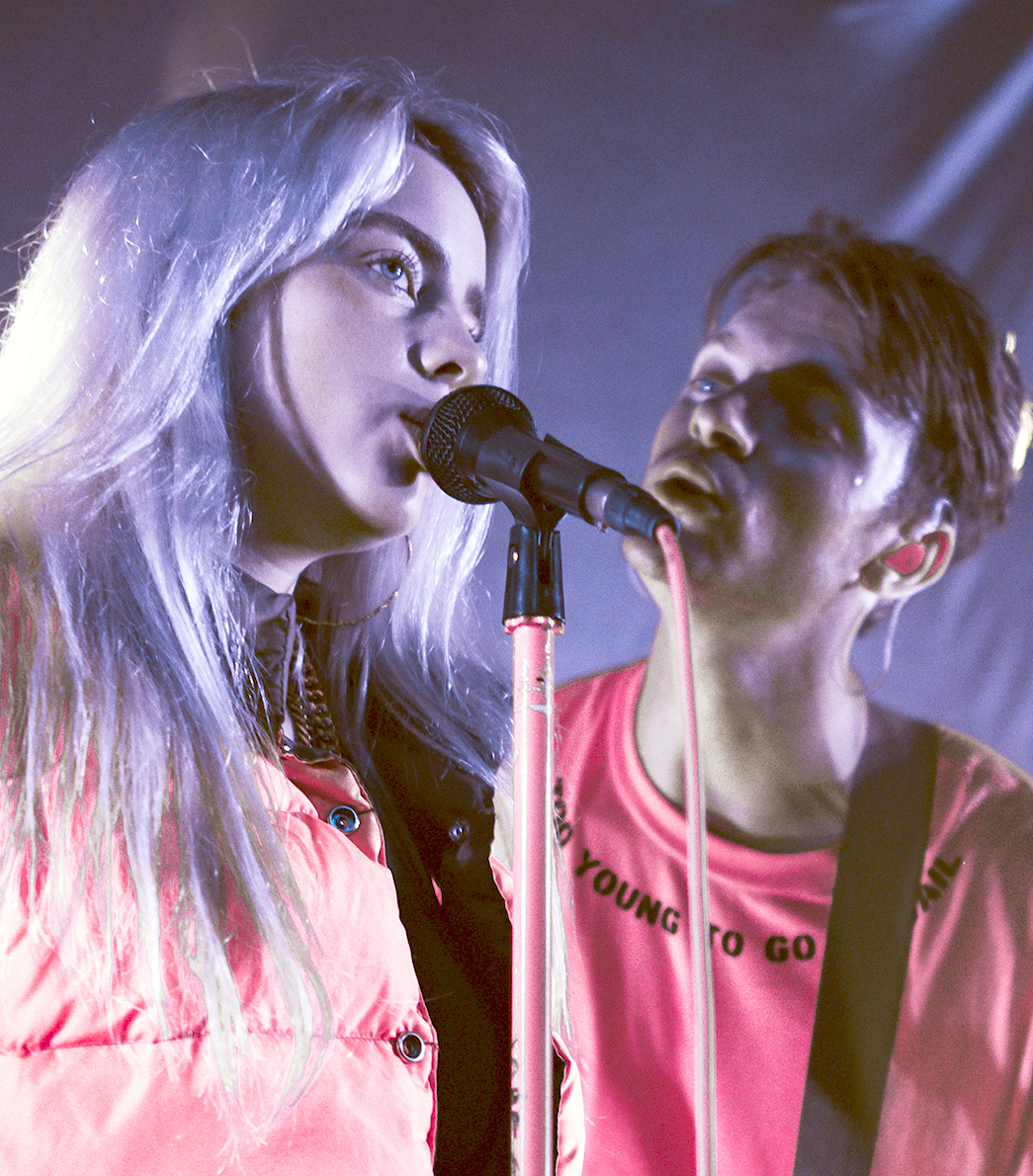
Billie Eilish and Finneas O'Connell won twice for "No Time to Die" from No Time to Die (2021) and "What Was I Made For" from Barbie (2023).

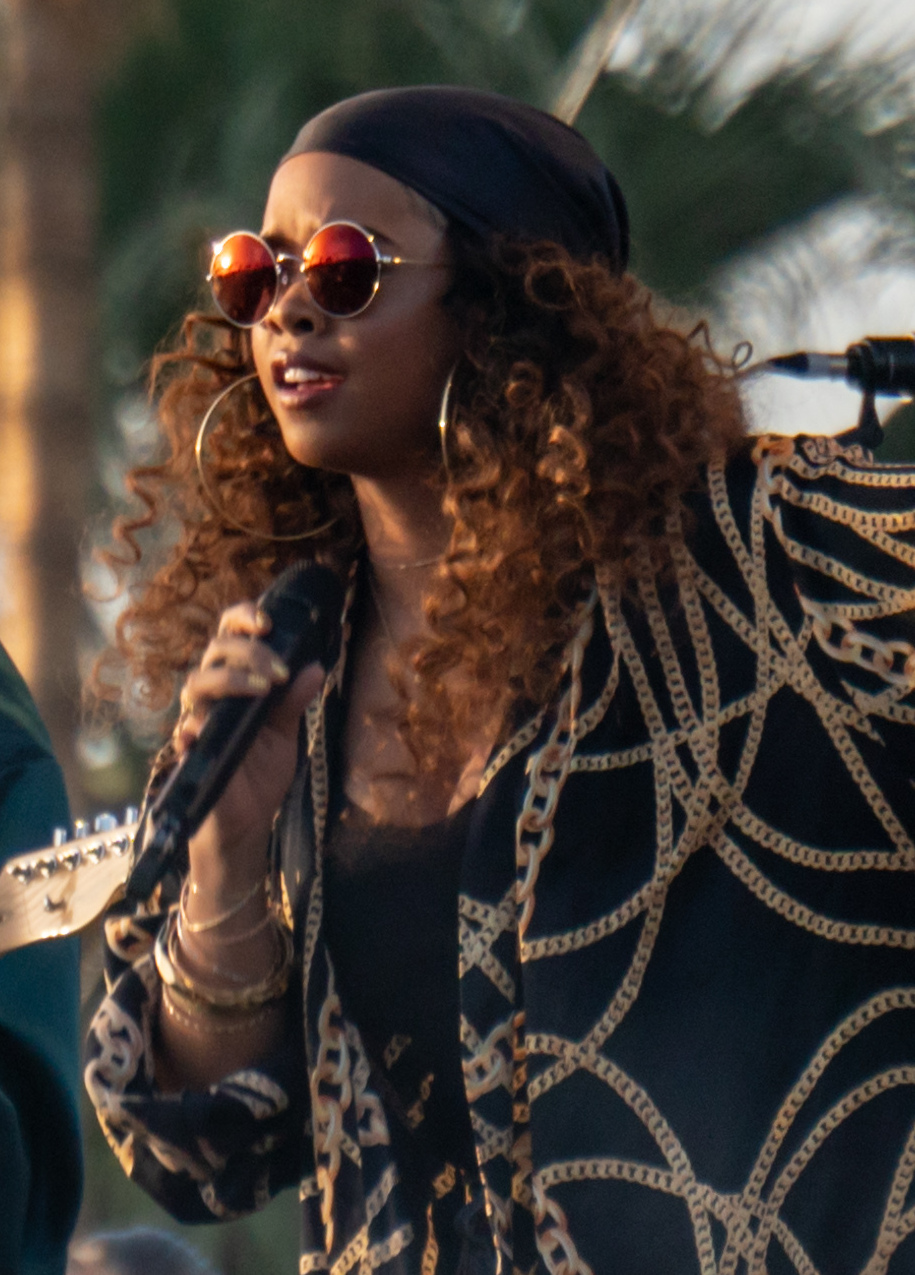
H.E.R. won alongside D'Mile and Tiara Thomas for "Fight for You" from Judas and the Black Messiah (2020).

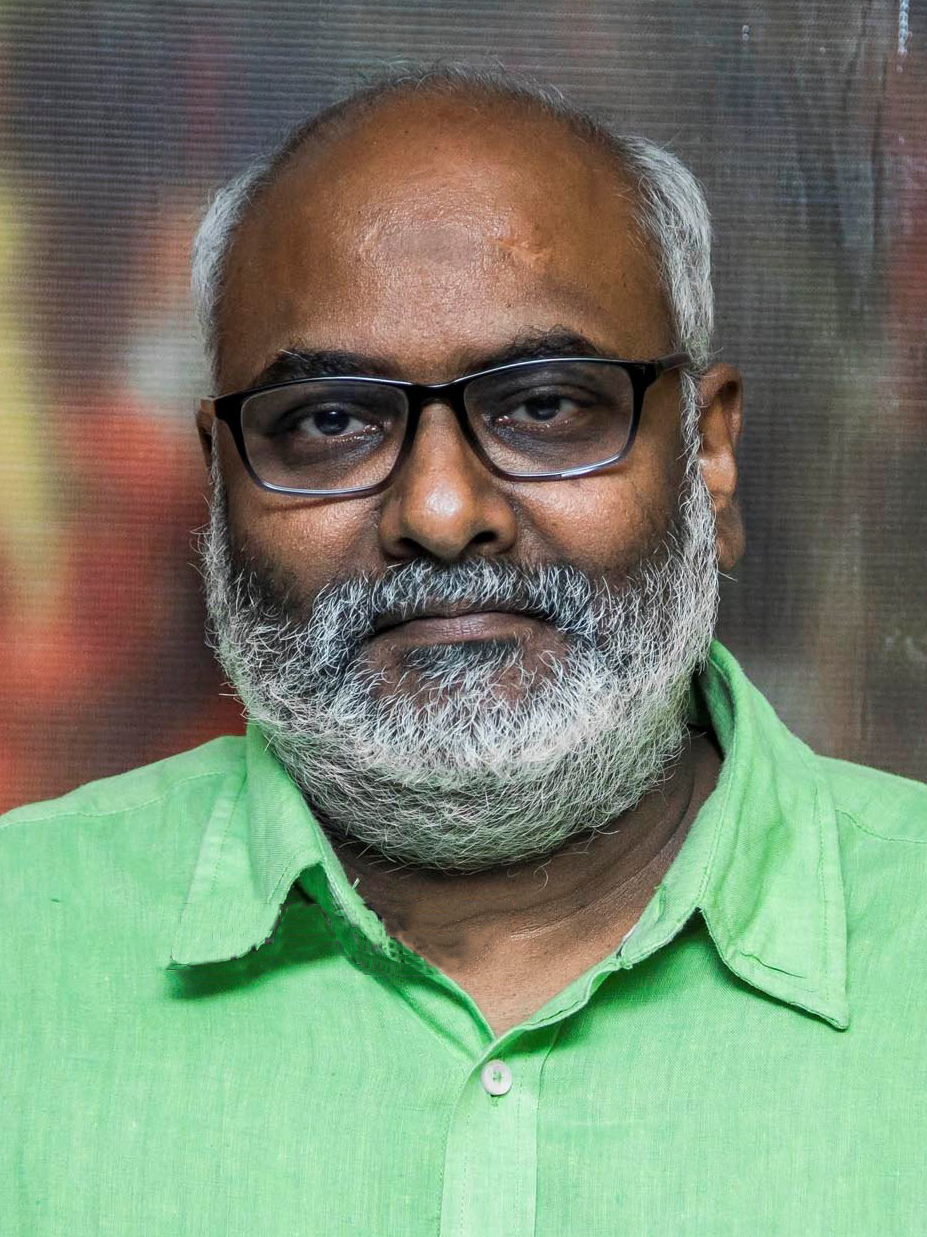
M. M. Keeravani won alongside Chandrabose for "Naatu Naatu" from RRR (2022).

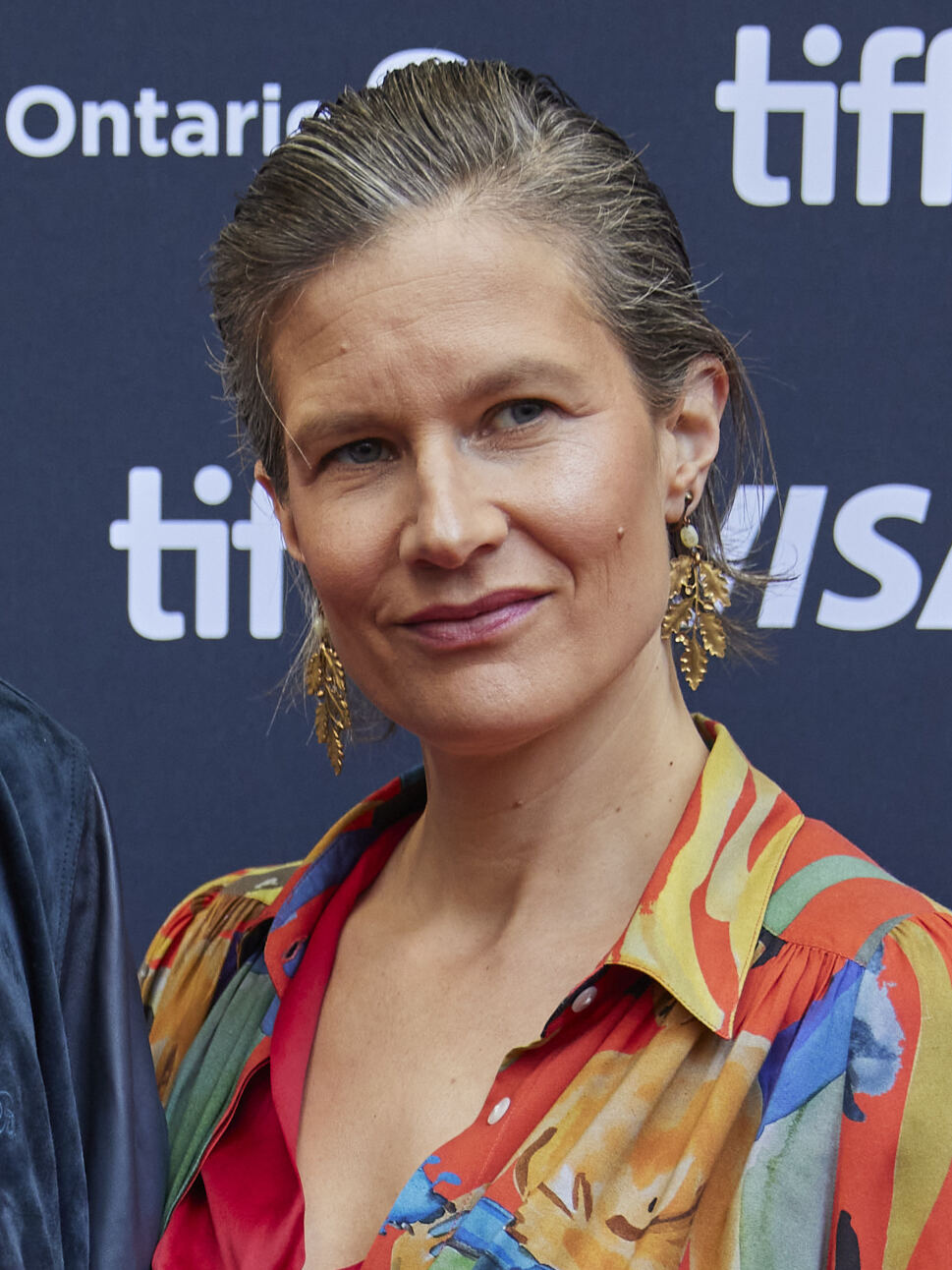
Camille won alongside Clément Ducol and Jacques Audiard for "El Mal" from Emilia Pérez (2024).

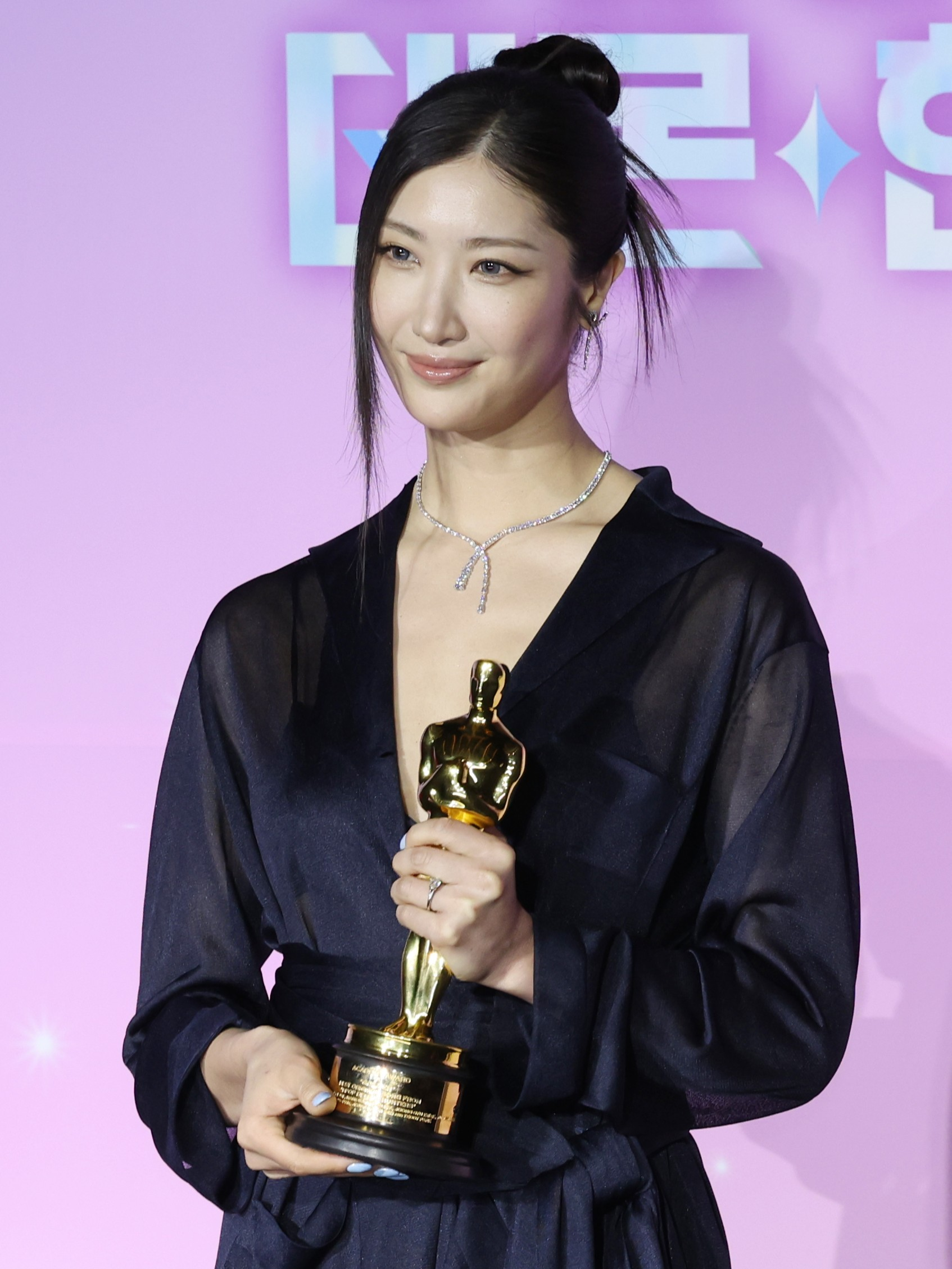
Ejae won alongside Mark Sonnenblick, Ido, Yu Han Lee, Hee Dong Nam, Mark Sonnenblick, Teddy and 24 for "Golden" from KPop Demon Hunters (2025).

=== 1930s ===
Year	Film	Song	Nominees
1934 (7th)	The Gay Divorcee	"The Continental"	Con Conrad (music); Herb Magidson (lyrics)
1934 (7th)	Flying Down to Rio	"Carioca"	Vincent Youmans (music); Edward Eliscu & Gus Kahn (lyrics)
1934 (7th)	She Loves Me Not	"Love in Bloom"	Ralph Rainger (music); Leo Robin (lyrics)
1935 (8th)	Gold Diggers of 1935	"Lullaby of Broadway"	Harry Warren (music); Al Dubin (lyrics)
1935 (8th)	Roberta	"Lovely to Look At"	Jerome Kern (music); Dorothy Fields & Jimmy McHugh (lyrics)
1935 (8th)	Top Hat	"Cheek to Cheek"	Irving Berlin (music & lyrics)
1936 (9th)	Swing Time	"The Way You Look Tonight"	Jerome Kern (music); Dorothy Fields (lyrics)
1936 (9th)	Born to Dance	"I've Got You Under My Skin"	Cole Porter (music & lyrics)
1936 (9th)	Pennies from Heaven	"Pennies from Heaven"	Arthur Johnston (music); Johnny Burke (lyrics)
1936 (9th)	Sing, Baby, Sing	"When Did You Leave Heaven"	Richard A. Whiting (music); Walter Bullock (lyrics)
1936 (9th)	Suzy	"Did I Remember"	Walter Donaldson (music); Harold Adamson (lyrics)
1936 (9th)	The Trail of the Lonesome Pine	"A Melody from the Sky"	Louis Alter (music); Sidney D. Mitchell (lyrics)
1937 (10th)	Waikiki Wedding	"Sweet Leilani"	Harry Owens (music & lyrics)
1937 (10th)	Artists and Models	"Whispers in the Dark"	Friedrich Hollaender (music); Leo Robin (lyrics)
1937 (10th)	Mr. Dodd Takes the Air	"Remember Me"	Harry Warren (music); Al Dubin (lyrics)
1937 (10th)	Shall We Dance	"They Can't Take That Away from Me"	George Gershwin (p.n.) (music); Ira Gershwin (lyrics)
1937 (10th)	Walter Wanger's Vogues of 1938	"That Old Feeling"	Sammy Fain (music); Lew Brown (lyrics)
1938 (11th)	The Big Broadcast of 1938	"Thanks for the Memory"	Ralph Rainger (music); Leo Robin (lyrics)
1938 (11th)	Alexander's Ragtime Band	"Now It Can Be Told"	Irving Berlin (music & lyrics)
1938 (11th)	Carefree	"Change Partners"	Irving Berlin (music & lyrics)
1938 (11th)	The Cowboy and the Lady	"The Cowboy and the Lady"	Lionel Newman (music); Arthur Quenzer (lyrics)
1938 (11th)	Going Places	"Jeepers Creepers"	Harry Warren (music); Johnny Mercer (lyrics)
1938 (11th)	The Lady Objects	"A Mist Is Over the Moon"	Ben Oakland (music); Oscar Hammerstein II (lyrics)
1938 (11th)	Mannequin	"Always and Always"	Edward Ward (music); Chet Forrest & Bob Wright (lyrics)
1938 (11th)	Merrily We Live	"Merrily We Live"	Phil Charig (music); Arthur Quenzer (lyrics)
1938 (11th)	That Certain Age	"My Own"	Jimmy McHugh (music); Harold Adamson (lyrics)
1938 (11th)	Under Western Stars	"Dust"	Johnny Marvin (music and lyrics)
1939 (12th)	The Wizard of Oz	"Over the Rainbow"	Harold Arlen (music); Yip Harburg (lyrics)
1939 (12th)	Gulliver's Travels	"Faithful Forever"	Ralph Rainger (music); Leo Robin (lyrics)
1939 (12th)	Love Affair	"Wishing"	Buddy DeSylva (music and lyrics)
1939 (12th)	Second Fiddle	"I Poured My Heart into a Song"	Irving Berlin (music and lyrics)

=== 1940s ===
Year	Film	Song	Nominees
1940 (13th)	Pinocchio	"When You Wish Upon a Star"	Leigh Harline (music); Ned Washington (lyrics)
1940 (13th)	Down Argentine Way	"Down Argentine Way"	Harry Warren (music); Mack Gordon (lyrics)
1940 (13th)	Hit Parade of 1941	"Who Am I?"	Jule Styne (music); Walter Bullock (lyrics)
1940 (13th)	Music in My Heart	"It's a Blue World"	Chet Forrest & Bob Wright (music & lyrics)
1940 (13th)	Rhythm on the River	"Only Forever"	James V. Monaco (music); John Burke (lyrics)
1940 (13th)	Second Chorus	"Love of My Life"	Artie Shaw (music); Johnny Mercer (lyrics)
1940 (13th)	Spring Parade	"Waltzing in the Clouds"	Robert Stolz (music); Gus Kahn (lyrics)
1940 (13th)	Strike Up the Band	"Our Love Affair"	Roger Edens & Arthur Freed (music & lyrics)
1940 (13th)	You'll Find Out	"I'd Know You Anywhere"	Jimmy McHugh (music); Johnny Mercer (lyrics)
1941 (14th)	Lady Be Good	"The Last Time I Saw Paris"	Jerome Kern (music); Oscar Hammerstein II (lyrics)
1941 (14th)	All-American Co-ed	"Out of the Silence"	Lloyd B. Norlin (music and lyrics)
1941 (14th)	Blues in the Night	"Blues in the Night"	Harold Arlen (music); Johnny Mercer (lyrics)
1941 (14th)	Buck Privates	"Boogie Woogie Bugle Boy"	Hughie Prince (music); Don Raye (lyrics)
1941 (14th)	Dumbo	"Baby Mine"	Frank Churchill (music); Ned Washington (lyrics)
1941 (14th)	Las Vegas Nights	"Dolores"	Louis Alter (music); Frank Loesser (lyrics)
1941 (14th)	Ridin' on a Rainbow	"Be Honest with Me"	Gene Autry & Fred Rose (music & lyrics)
1941 (14th)	Sun Valley Serenade	"Chattanooga Choo Choo"	Harry Warren (music); Mack Gordon (lyrics)
1941 (14th)	You'll Never Get Rich	"Since I Kissed My Baby Goodbye"	Cole Porter (music & lyrics)
1942 (15th)	Holiday Inn	"White Christmas"	Irving Berlin (music & lyrics)
1942 (15th)	Always in My Heart	"Always in My Heart"	Ernesto Lecuona (music); Kim Gannon (lyrics)
1942 (15th)	Babes on Broadway	"How About You?"	Burton Lane (music); Ralph Freed (lyrics)
1942 (15th)	Bambi	"Love Is a Song"	Frank Churchill (p.n.) (music); Larry Morey (lyrics)
1942 (15th)	Flying with Music	"Pennies for Peppino"	Edward Ward (music); Chet Forrest & Bob Wright (lyrics)
1942 (15th)	Hellzapoppin' (Note: The nominations list and awards dinner program from 1942 list "Pig Foot Pete" as a nomination for Hellzapoppin', released in Los Angeles in 1942. The song does not appear in the film, but rather in Keep 'Em Flying, a 1941 release from the same production company and studio. The song would have been ineligible for nomination.)	"Pig Foot Pete"	Gene de Paul (music); Don Raye (lyrics)
1942 (15th)	The Mayor of 44th Street	"There's a Breeze on Lake Louise"	Harry Revel (music); Mort Greene (lyrics)
1942 (15th)	Orchestra Wives	"(I've Got a Gal in) Kalamazoo"	Harry Warren (music); Mack Gordon (lyrics)
1942 (15th)	You Were Never Lovelier	"Dearly Beloved"	Jerome Kern (music); Johnny Mercer (lyrics)
1942 (15th)	Youth on Parade	"I've Heard That Song Before"	Jule Styne (music); Sammy Cahn (lyrics)
1943 (16th)	Hello, Frisco, Hello	"You'll Never Know"	Harry Warren (music); Mack Gordon (lyrics)
1943 (16th)	Cabin in the Sky	"Happiness Is a Thing Called Joe"	Harold Arlen (music); Yip Harburg (lyrics)
1943 (16th)	Hers to Hold	"Say a Pray'r for the Boys Over There"	Jimmy McHugh (music); Herb Magidson (lyrics)
1943 (16th)	Hit Parade of 1943	"Change of Heart"	Jule Styne (music); Harold Adamson (lyrics)
1943 (16th)	Saludos Amigos	"Saludos Amigos"	Charles Wolcott (music); Ned Washington (lyrics)
1943 (16th)	The Sky's the Limit	"My Shining Hour"	Arlen (music); Johnny Mercer (lyrics)
1943 (16th)	Something to Shout About	"You'd Be So Nice to Come Home To"	Cole Porter (music & lyrics)
1943 (16th)	Stage Door Canteen	"We Mustn't Say Goodbye"	James V. Monaco (music); Al Dubin (lyrics)
1943 (16th)	Star Spangled Rhythm	"That Old Black Magic" (Note: In 1943, "That Old Black Magic" was nominated under the title "Black Magic" as it was submitted by Paramount Pictures' Music Department. Academy records have since been revised to reflect the more common title.)	Harold Arlen (music); Johnny Mercer (lyrics)
1943 (16th)	Thank Your Lucky Stars	"They're Either Too Young or Too Old"	Arthur Schwartz (music); Frank Loesser (lyrics)
1944 (17th)	Going My Way	"Swinging on a Star"	Jimmy Van Heusen (music); Johnny Burke (lyrics)
1944 (17th)	Brazil	"Rio de Janeiro"	Ary Barroso (music); Ned Washington (lyrics)
1944 (17th)	Cover Girl	"Long Ago (and Far Away)"	Jerome Kern (music); Ira Gershwin (lyrics)
1944 (17th)	Follow the Boys	"I'll Walk Alone"	Jule Styne (music); Sammy Cahn (lyrics)
1944 (17th)	Higher and Higher	"I Couldn't Sleep a Wink Last Night"	Jimmy McHugh (music); Harold Adamson (lyrics)
1944 (17th)	Hollywood Canteen	"Sweet Dreams, Sweetheart"	M. K. Jerome (music); Ted Koehler (lyrics)
1944 (17th)	Lady, Let's Dance	"Silver Shadows and Golden Dreams"	Lew Pollack (music); Charles Newman (lyrics)
1944 (17th)	Meet Me in St. Louis	"The Trolley Song"	Ralph Blane & Hugh Martin (music & lyrics)
1944 (17th)	Minstrel Man	"Remember Me to Carolina"	Harry Revel (music); Paul Francis Webster (lyrics)
1944 (17th)	Song of the Open Road	"Too Much in Love"	Walter Kent (music); Kim Gannon (lyrics)
1944 (17th)	Sweet and Low-Down	"I'm Making Believe"	James V. Monaco (music); Mack Gordon (lyrics)
1944 (17th)	Up in Arms	"Now I Know"	Harold Arlen (music); Ted Koehler (lyrics)
1945 (18th)	State Fair	"It Might as Well Be Spring"	Richard Rodgers (music); Oscar Hammerstein II (lyrics)
1945 (18th)	Anchors Aweigh	"I Fall in Love Too Easily"	Jule Styne (music); Sammy Cahn (lyrics)
1945 (18th)	Belle of the Yukon	"Sleighride in July"	Jimmy Van Heusen (music); Johnny Burke (lyrics)
1945 (18th)	The Bells of St. Mary's	"Aren't You Glad You're You?"	Jimmy Van Heusen (music); Johnny Burke (lyrics)
1945 (18th)	Can't Help Singing	"More and More"	Jerome Kern (p.n.) (music); Yip Harburg (lyrics)
1945 (18th)	Earl Carroll Vanities	"Endlessly"	Walter Kent (music); Kim Gannon (lyrics)
1945 (18th)	Here Come the Waves	"Ac-Cent-Tchu-Ate the Positive"	Harold Arlen (music); Johnny Mercer (lyrics)
1945 (18th)	Love Letters	"Love Letters"	Victor Young (music); Edward Heyman (lyrics)
1945 (18th)	San Antonio	"Some Sunday Morning"	Ray Heindorf & M. K. Jerome (music); Ted Koehler (lyrics)
1945 (18th)	Sing Your Way Home	"I'll Buy That Dream"	Allie Wrubel (music); Herb Magidson (lyrics)
1945 (18th)	The Story of G.I. Joe	"Linda"	Ann Ronell (music & lyrics)
1945 (18th)	Tonight and Every Night	"Anywhere"	Jule Styne (music); Sammy Cahn (lyrics)
1945 (18th)	Why Girls Leave Home	"The Cat and the Canary"	Jay Livingston (music); Ray Evans (lyrics)
1945 (18th)	Wonder Man	"So in Love"	David Rose (music); Leo Robin (lyrics)
1946 (19th) (Note: A nomination for "This Is Always" from Three Little Girls in Blue, with music by Harry Warren and lyrics by Mack Gordon, was revoked shortly after nominations were announced. The song had been removed from the final cut of the film, rendering it ineligible. "I Can't Begin to Tell You" from The Dolly Sisters became the fifth nominee following a revote.)	The Harvey Girls	"On the Atchison, Topeka and the Santa Fe"	Harry Warren (music); Johnny Mercer (lyrics)
1946 (19th)	Blue Skies	"You Keep Coming Back Like a Song"	Irving Berlin (music & lyrics)
1946 (19th)	Canyon Passage	"Ole Buttermilk Sky"	Hoagy Carmichael (music); Jack Brooks (lyrics)
1946 (19th)	Centennial Summer	"All Through the Day"	Jerome Kern (p.n.) (music); Oscar Hammerstein II (lyrics)
1946 (19th)	The Dolly Sisters	"I Can't Begin to Tell You"	James V. Monaco (p.n.) (music); Mack Gordon (lyrics)
1947 (20th)	Song of the South	"Zip-a-Dee-Doo-Dah"	Allie Wrubel (music); Ray Gilbert (lyrics)
1947 (20th)	Good News	"Pass That Peace Pipe"	Ralph Blane, Roger Edens & Hugh Martin (music & lyrics)
1947 (20th)	Mother Wore Tights	"You Do"	Josef Myrow (music); Mack Gordon (lyrics)
1947 (20th)	The Perils of Pauline	"I Wish I Didn't Love You So"	Frank Loesser (music & lyrics)
1947 (20th)	The Time, the Place and the Girl	"A Gal in Calico"	Arthur Schwartz (music); Leo Robin (lyrics)
1948 (21st)	The Paleface	"Buttons and Bows"	Ray Evans & Jay Livingston (music & lyrics)
1948 (21st)	Casbah	"For Every Man There's a Woman"	Harold Arlen (music); Leo Robin (lyrics)
1948 (21st)	Romance on the High Seas	"It's Magic"	Jule Styne (music); Sammy Cahn (lyrics)
1948 (21st)	That Lady in Ermine	"This Is the Moment"	Friedrich Hollaender (music); Leo Robin (lyrics)
1948 (21st)	Wet Blanket Policy	"The Woody Woodpecker Song"	Ramey Idriss & George Tibbles (music & lyrics)
1949 (22nd)	Neptune's Daughter	"Baby, It's Cold Outside"	Frank Loesser (music & lyrics)
1949 (22nd)	Come to the Stable	"Through a Long and Sleepless Night"	Alfred Newman (music); Mack Gordon (lyrics)
1949 (22nd)	It's a Great Feeling	"It's a Great Feeling"	Jule Styne (music); Sammy Cahn (lyrics)
1949 (22nd)	My Foolish Heart	"My Foolish Heart"	Victor Young (music); Ned Washington (lyrics)
1949 (22nd)	So Dear to My Heart	"Lavender Blue"	Eliot Daniel (music); Larry Morey (lyrics)

=== 1950s ===
Year	Film	Song	Nominees
1950 (23rd)	Captain Carey, U.S.A.	"Mona Lisa"	Ray Evans & Jay Livingston (music & lyrics)
1950 (23rd)	Cinderella	"Bibbidi-Bobbidi-Boo"	Mack David, Al Hoffman & Jerry Livingston (music & lyrics)
1950 (23rd)	Singing Guns	"Mule Train"	Fred Glickman, Hy Heath & Johnny Lange (music & lyrics)
1950 (23rd)	The Toast of New Orleans	"Be My Love"	Slug Brodszky (music); Sammy Cahn (lyrics)
1950 (23rd)	Wabash Avenue	"Wilhelmina"	Josef Myrow (music); Mack Gordon (lyrics)
1951 (24th)	Here Comes the Groom	"In the Cool, Cool, Cool of the Evening"	Hoagy Carmichael (music); Johnny Mercer (lyrics)
1951 (24th)	Golden Girl	"Never"	Lionel Newman (music); Eliot Daniel (lyrics)
1951 (24th)	Rich, Young and Pretty	"Wonder Why"	Slug Brodszky (music); Sammy Cahn (lyrics)
1951 (24th)	Royal Wedding	"Too Late Now"	Burton Lane (music); Alan Jay Lerner (lyrics)
1951 (24th)	The Strip	"A Kiss to Build a Dream On"	Bert Kalmar (p.n.), Oscar Hammerstein II & Harry Ruby (music & lyrics)
1952 (25th)	High Noon	"The Ballad of High Noon"	Dimitri Tiomkin (music); Ned Washington (lyrics)
1952 (25th)	Because You're Mine	"Because You're Mine"	Slug Brodszky (music); Sammy Cahn (lyrics)
1952 (25th)	Hans Christian Andersen	"Thumbelina"	Frank Loesser (music & lyrics)
1952 (25th)	Just for You	"Zing a Little Zong"	Harry Warren (music); Leo Robin (lyrics)
1952 (25th)	Son of Paleface	"Am I in Love"	Jack Brooks (music & lyrics)
1953 (26th)	Calamity Jane	"Secret Love"	Sammy Fain (music); Paul Francis Webster (lyrics)
1953 (26th)	The Caddy	"That's Amore"	Harry Warren (music); Jack Brooks (lyrics)
1953 (26th)	Miss Sadie Thompson	"Blue Pacific Blues"	Lester Lee (music); Ned Washington (lyrics)
1953 (26th)	The Moon Is Blue	"The Moon Is Blue"	Herschel Burke Gilbert (music); Sylvia Fine (lyrics)
1953 (26th)	Small Town Girl	"My Flaming Heart"	Slug Brodszky (music); Leo Robin (lyrics)
1954 (27th)	Three Coins in the Fountain	"Three Coins in the Fountain"	Jule Styne (music); Sammy Cahn (lyrics)
1954 (27th)	The High and the Mighty	"The High and the Mighty"	Dimitri Tiomkin (music); Ned Washington (lyrics)
1954 (27th)	A Star Is Born	"The Man That Got Away"	Harold Arlen (music); Ira Gershwin (lyrics)
1954 (27th)	Susan Slept Here	"Hold My Hand"	Jack Lawrence & Richard Myers (music & lyrics)
1954 (27th)	White Christmas	"Count Your Blessings"	Irving Berlin (music & lyrics)
1955 (28th)	Love Is a Many-Splendored Thing	"Love Is a Many-Splendored Thing"	Sammy Fain (music); Paul Francis Webster (lyrics)
1955 (28th)	Daddy Long Legs	"Something's Gotta Give"	Johnny Mercer (music & lyrics)
1955 (28th)	Love Me or Leave Me	"I'll Never Stop Loving You"	Slug Brodszky (music); Sammy Cahn (lyrics)
1955 (28th)	The Tender Trap	"(Love Is) The Tender Trap"	Jimmy Van Heusen (music); Cahn (lyrics)
1955 (28th)	Unchained	"Unchained Melody"	Alex North (music); Hy Zaret (lyrics)
1956 (29th)	The Man Who Knew Too Much	"Que Sera, Sera"	Ray Evans & Jay Livingston (music & lyrics)
1956 (29th)	Friendly Persuasion	"Friendly Persuasion"	Dimitri Tiomkin (music); Paul Francis Webster (lyrics)
1956 (29th)	High Society	"True Love"	Cole Porter (music & lyrics)
1956 (29th)	Julie	"Julie"	Leith Stevens (music); Tom Adair (lyrics)
1956 (29th)	Written on the Wind	"Written on the Wind"	Victor Young (p.n.) (music); Sammy Cahn (lyrics)
1957 (30th)	The Joker Is Wild	"All the Way"	Jimmy Van Heusen (music); Sammy Cahn (lyrics)
1957 (30th)	An Affair to Remember	"An Affair to Remember"	Harry Warren (music); Harold Adamson & Leo McCarey (lyrics)
1957 (30th)	April Love	"April Love"	Sammy Fain (music); Paul Francis Webster (lyrics)
1957 (30th)	Tammy and the Bachelor	"Tammy"	Ray Evans & Jay Livingston (music & lyrics)
1957 (30th)	Wild Is the Wind	"Wild Is the Wind"	Dimitri Tiomkin (music); Ned Washington (lyrics)
1958 (31st)	Gigi	"Gigi"	Frederick Loewe (music); Alan Jay Lerner (lyrics)
1958 (31st)	A Certain Smile	"A Certain Smile"	Sammy Fain (music); Paul Francis Webster (lyrics)
1958 (31st)	Houseboat	"Almost in Your Arms"	Ray Evans & Jay Livingston (music & lyrics)
1958 (31st)	Marjorie Morningstar	"A Very Precious Love"	Fain (music); Webster (lyrics)
1958 (31st)	Some Came Running	"To Love and Be Loved"	Jimmy Van Heusen (music); Sammy Cahn (lyrics)
1959 (32nd)	A Hole in the Head	"High Hopes"	Jimmy Van Heusen (music); Sammy Cahn (lyrics)
1959 (32nd)	The Best of Everything	"The Best of Everything"	Alfred Newman (music); Cahn (lyrics)
1959 (32nd)	The Five Pennies	"The Five Pennies"	Sylvia Fine (music & lyrics)
1959 (32nd)	The Hanging Tree	"The Hanging Tree"	Jerry Livingston (music); Mack David (lyrics)
1959 (32nd)	The Young Land	"Strange Are the Ways of Love"	Dimitri Tiomkin (music); Ned Washington (lyrics)

=== 1960s ===
Year	Film	Song	Nominees
1960 (33rd)	Never on Sunday	"Never on Sunday"	Manos Hatzidakis (music & lyrics)
1960 (33rd)	The Alamo	"The Green Leaves of Summer"	Dimitri Tiomkin (music); Paul Francis Webster (lyrics)
1960 (33rd)	The Facts of Life	"The Facts of Life"	Johnny Mercer (music & lyrics)
1960 (33rd)	High Time	"The Second Time Around"	Jimmy Van Heusen (music); Sammy Cahn (lyrics)
1960 (33rd)	Pepe	"Faraway Part of Town"	André Previn (music); Dory Previn (lyrics)
1961 (34th)	Breakfast at Tiffany's	"Moon River"	Henry Mancini (music); Johnny Mercer (lyrics)
1961 (34th)	Bachelor in Paradise	"Bachelor in Paradise"	Mancini (music); Mack David (lyrics)
1961 (34th)	El Cid	"The Falcon and the Dove"	Miklós Rózsa (music); Paul Francis Webster (lyrics)
1961 (34th)	Pocketful of Miracles	"Pocketful of Miracles"	Jimmy Van Heusen (music); Sammy Cahn (lyrics)
1961 (34th)	Town Without Pity	"Town Without Pity"	Dimitri Tiomkin (music); Ned Washington (lyrics)
1962 (35th)	Days of Wine and Roses	"Days of Wine and Roses"	Henry Mancini (music); Johnny Mercer (lyrics)
1962 (35th)	Mutiny on the Bounty	"Follow Me"	Bronisław Kaper (music); Paul Francis Webster (lyrics)
1962 (35th)	Tender Is the Night	"Tender Is the Night"	Sammy Fain (music); Webster (lyrics)
1962 (35th)	Two for the Seesaw	"Second Chance"	André Previn (music); Dory Previn (lyrics)
1962 (35th)	Walk on the Wild Side	"Walk on the Wild Side"	Elmer Bernstein (music); Mack David (lyrics)
1963 (36th)	Papa's Delicate Condition	"Call Me Irresponsible"	Jimmy Van Heusen (music); Sammy Cahn (lyrics)
1963 (36th)	55 Days at Peking	"So Little Time"	Dimitri Tiomkin (music); Paul Francis Webster (lyrics)
1963 (36th)	Charade	"Charade"	Henry Mancini (music); Johnny Mercer (lyrics)
1963 (36th)	It's a Mad, Mad, Mad, Mad World	"It's a Mad, Mad, Mad, Mad World"	Ernest Gold (music); Mack David (lyrics)
1963 (36th)	Mondo Cane	"More"	Nino Oliviero & Riz Ortolani (music); Norman Newell (lyrics)
1964 (37th)	Mary Poppins	"Chim Chim Cher-ee"	Sherman Brothers (music & lyrics)
1964 (37th)	Dear Heart	"Dear Heart"	Henry Mancini (music); Ray Evans & Jay Livingston (lyrics)
1964 (37th)	Hush...Hush, Sweet Charlotte	"Hush... Hush, Sweet Charlotte"	De Vol (music); Mack David (lyrics)
1964 (37th)	Robin and the 7 Hoods	"My Kind of Town"	Jimmy Van Heusen (music); Sammy Cahn (lyrics)
1964 (37th)	Where Love Has Gone	"Where Love Has Gone"	Jimmy Van Heusen (music); Sammy Cahn (lyrics)
1965 (38th)	The Sandpiper	"The Shadow of Your Smile"	Johnny Mandel (music); Paul Francis Webster (lyrics)
1965 (38th)	Cat Ballou	"The Ballad of Cat Ballou"	Jerry Livingston (music); Mack David (lyrics)
1965 (38th)	The Great Race	"The Sweetheart Tree"	Henry Mancini (music); Johnny Mercer (lyrics)
1965 (38th)	The Umbrellas of Cherbourg	"I Will Wait for You"	Michel Legrand (music); Jacques Demy (lyrics); Norman Gimbel (English lyrics)
1965 (38th)	What's New Pussycat?	"What's New Pussycat?"	Burt Bacharach (music); Hal David (lyrics)
1966 (39th)	Born Free	"Born Free"	John Barry (music); Don Black (lyrics)
1966 (39th)	Alfie	"Alfie"	Burt Bacharach (music); Hal David (lyrics)
1966 (39th)	An American Dream	"A Time for Love"	Johnny Mandel (music); Paul Francis Webster (lyrics)
1966 (39th)	Georgy Girl	"Georgy Girl"	Tom Springfield (music); Jim Dale (lyrics)
1966 (39th)	Hawaii	"My Wishing Doll"	Elmer Bernstein (music); Mack David (lyrics)
1967 (40th)	Doctor Dolittle	"Talk to the Animals"	Leslie Bricusse (music & lyrics)
1967 (40th)	Banning	"The Eyes of Love"	Quincy Jones (music); Bob Russell (lyrics)
1967 (40th)	Casino Royale	"The Look of Love"	Burt Bacharach (music); Hal David (lyrics)
1967 (40th)	The Jungle Book	"The Bare Necessities"	Terry Gilkyson (music & lyrics)
1967 (40th)	Thoroughly Modern Millie	"Thoroughly Modern Millie"	Sammy Cahn & Jimmy Van Heusen (music & lyrics)
1968 (41st)	The Thomas Crown Affair	"The Windmills of Your Mind"	Michel Legrand (music); Alan & Marilyn Bergman (lyrics)
1968 (41st)	Chitty Chitty Bang Bang	"Chitty Chitty Bang Bang"	Sherman Brothers (music & lyrics)
1968 (41st)	For Love of Ivy	"For Love of Ivy"	Quincy Jones (music); Bob Russell (lyrics)
1968 (41st)	Funny Girl	"Funny Girl"	Jule Styne (music); Bob Merrill (lyrics)
1968 (41st)	Star!	"Star!"	Jimmy Van Heusen (music); Sammy Cahn (lyrics)
1969 (42nd)	Butch Cassidy and the Sundance Kid	"Raindrops Keep Fallin' on My Head"	Burt Bacharach (music); Hal David (lyrics)
1969 (42nd)	The Happy Ending	"What Are You Doing the Rest of Your Life?"	Michel Legrand (music); Alan & Marilyn Bergman (lyrics)
1969 (42nd)	The Prime of Miss Jean Brodie	"Jean"	Rod McKuen (music & lyrics)
1969 (42nd)	The Sterile Cuckoo	"Come Saturday Morning"	Fred Karlin (music); Dory Previn (lyrics)
1969 (42nd)	True Grit	"True Grit"	Elmer Bernstein (music); Don Black (lyrics)

=== 1970s ===
Year	Film	Song	Nominees
1970 (43rd)	Lovers and Other Strangers	"For All We Know"	Fred Karlin (music); Jimmy Griffin & Robb Royer (lyrics)
1970 (43rd)	Darling Lili	"Whistling Away the Dark"	Henry Mancini (music); Johnny Mercer (lyrics)
1970 (43rd)	Madron	"Till Love Touches Your Life"	Riz Ortolani (music); Arthur Hamilton (lyrics)
1970 (43rd)	Pieces of Dreams	"Pieces of Dreams"	Michel Legrand (music); Alan & Marilyn Bergman (lyrics)
1970 (43rd)	Scrooge	"Thank You Very Much"	Leslie Bricusse (music & lyrics)
1971 (44th)	Shaft	"Theme from Shaft"	Isaac Hayes (music & lyrics)
1971 (44th)	Bedknobs and Broomsticks	"The Age of Not Believing"	Sherman Brothers (music & lyrics)
1971 (44th)	Bless the Beasts & Children	"Bless the Beasts & Children"	Perry Botkin Jr. & Barry De Vorzon (music and lyrics)
1971 (44th)	Kotch	"Life Is What You Make It"	Marvin Hamlisch (music); Johnny Mercer (lyrics)
1971 (44th)	Sometimes a Great Notion	"All His Children"	Henry Mancini (music); Alan & Marilyn Bergman (lyrics)
1972 (45th)	The Poseidon Adventure	"The Morning After"	Joel Hirschhorn & Al Kasha (music & lyrics)
1972 (45th)	Ben	"Ben"	Walter Scharf (music); Don Black (lyrics)
1972 (45th)	The Life and Times of Judge Roy Bean	"Marmalade, Molasses & Honey"	Maurice Jarre (music); Alan & Marilyn Bergman (lyrics)
1972 (45th)	The Little Ark	"Come Follow, Follow Me"	Fred Karlin (music); Marsha Karlin (lyrics)
1972 (45th)	The Stepmother	"Strange Are the Ways of Love"	Sammy Fain (music); Paul Francis Webster (lyrics)
1973 (46th)	The Way We Were	"The Way We Were"	Marvin Hamlisch (music); Alan & Marilyn Bergman (lyrics)
1973 (46th)	Cinderella Liberty	"Nice to Be Around"	John Williams (music); Paul Williams (lyrics)
1973 (46th)	Live and Let Die	"Live and Let Die"	Linda & Paul McCartney (music & lyrics)
1973 (46th)	Robin Hood	"Love"	George Bruns (music); Floyd Huddleston (lyrics)
1973 (46th)	A Touch of Class	"All That Love Went to Waste"	George Barrie (music); Sammy Cahn (lyrics)
1974 (47th)	The Towering Inferno	"We May Never Love Like This Again"	Joel Hirschhorn & Al Kasha (music & lyrics)
1974 (47th)	Benji	"I Feel Love"	Euel Box (music); Betty Box (lyrics)
1974 (47th)	Blazing Saddles	"Blazing Saddles"	John Morris (music); Mel Brooks (lyrics)
1974 (47th)	Gold	"Wherever Love Takes Me"	Elmer Bernstein (music); Don Black (lyrics)
1974 (47th)	The Little Prince	"Little Prince"	Frederick Loewe (music); Alan Jay Lerner (lyrics)
1975 (48th)	Nashville	"I'm Easy"	Keith Carradine (music & lyrics)
1975 (48th)	Funny Lady	"How Lucky Can You Get"	Fred Ebb & John Kander (music & lyrics)
1975 (48th)	Mahogany	"Do You Know Where You're Going To"	Michael Masser (music); Gerry Goffin (lyrics)
1975 (48th)	The Other Side of the Mountain	"Richard's Window"	Charles Fox (music); Norman Gimbel (lyrics)
1975 (48th)	Whiffs	"Now That We're in Love"	George Barrie (music); Sammy Cahn (lyrics)
1976 (49th)	A Star Is Born	"Evergreen"	Barbra Streisand (music); Paul Williams (lyrics)
1976 (49th)	Half a House	"A World That Never Was"	Sammy Fain (music); Paul Francis Webster (lyrics)
1976 (49th)	The Omen	"Ave Satani"	Jerry Goldsmith (music & lyrics)
1976 (49th)	The Pink Panther Strikes Again	"Come to Me"	Henry Mancini (music); Don Black (lyrics)
1976 (49th)	Rocky	"Gonna Fly Now"	Bill Conti (music); Carol Connors & Ayn Robbins (lyrics)
1977 (50th)	You Light Up My Life	"You Light Up My Life"	Joseph Brooks (music & lyrics)
1977 (50th)	Pete's Dragon	"Candle on the Water"	Joel Hirschhorn & Al Kasha (music & lyrics)
1977 (50th)	The Rescuers	"Someone's Waiting for You"	Sammy Fain (music); Carol Connors & Ayn Robbins (lyrics)
1977 (50th)	The Slipper and the Rose	"He/She Danced with Me"	Sherman Brothers (music & lyrics)
1977 (50th)	The Spy Who Loved Me	"Nobody Does It Better"	Marvin Hamlisch (music); Carole Bayer Sager (lyrics)
1978 (51st)	Thank God It's Friday	"Last Dance"	Paul Jabara (music & lyrics)
1978 (51st)	Foul Play	"Ready to Take a Chance Again"	Charles Fox (music); Norman Gimbel (lyrics)
1978 (51st)	Grease	"Hopelessly Devoted to You"	John Farrar (music & lyrics)
1978 (51st)	The Magic of Lassie	"When You're Loved"	Sherman Brothers (music & lyrics)
1978 (51st)	Same Time, Next Year	"The Last Time I Felt Like This"	Marvin Hamlisch (music); Alan & Marilyn Bergman (lyrics)
1979 (52nd)	Norma Rae	"It Goes Like It Goes"	David Shire (music); Norman Gimbel (lyrics)
1979 (52nd)	10	"It's Easy to Say"	Henry Mancini (music); Robert Wells (lyrics)
1979 (52nd)	Ice Castles	"Through the Eyes of Love"	Marvin Hamlisch (music); Carole Bayer Sager (lyrics)
1979 (52nd)	The Muppet Movie	"Rainbow Connection"	Kenny Ascher & Paul Williams (music & lyrics)
1979 (52nd)	The Promise	"I'll Never Say Goodbye"	David Shire (music); Alan & Marilyn Bergman (lyrics)

=== 1980s ===
Year	Film	Song	Nominees
1980 (53rd)	Fame	"Fame"	Michael Gore (music); Dean Pitchford (lyrics)
1980 (53rd)	9 to 5	"9 to 5"	Dolly Parton (music & lyrics)
1980 (53rd)	The Competition	"People Alone"	Lalo Schifrin (music); Will Jennings (lyrics)
1980 (53rd)	Fame	"Out Here on My Own"	Michael Gore (music); Lesley Gore (lyrics)
1980 (53rd)	Honeysuckle Rose	"On the Road Again"	Willie Nelson (music & lyrics)
1981 (54th)	Arthur	"Best That You Can Do"	Peter Allen, Burt Bacharach, Christopher Cross & Carole Bayer Sager (music & lyrics)
1981 (54th)	Endless Love	"Endless Love"	Lionel Richie (music & lyrics)
1981 (54th)	For Your Eyes Only	"For Your Eyes Only"	Bill Conti (music); Mick Leeson (lyrics)
1981 (54th)	The Great Muppet Caper	"The First Time It Happens"	Joe Raposo (music & lyrics)
1981 (54th)	Ragtime	"One More Hour"	Randy Newman (music & lyrics)
1982 (55th)	An Officer and a Gentleman	"Up Where We Belong"	Jack Nitzsche & Buffy Sainte-Marie (music); Will Jennings (lyrics)
1982 (55th)	Best Friends	"How Do You Keep the Music Playing?"	Michel Legrand (music); Alan & Marilyn Bergman (lyrics)
1982 (55th)	Rocky III	"Eye of the Tiger"	Jim Peterik & Frankie Sullivan (music & lyrics)
1982 (55th)	Tootsie	"It Might Be You"	Dave Grusin (music); A. & M. Bergman (lyrics)
1982 (55th)	Yes, Giorgio	"If We Were in Love"	John Williams (music); A. & M. Bergman (lyrics)
1983 (56th)	Flashdance	"Flashdance... What a Feeling"	Giorgio Moroder (music); Irene Cara & Keith Forsey (lyrics)
1983 (56th)	Flashdance	"Maniac"	Dennis Matkosky & Michael Sembello (music & lyrics)
1983 (56th)	Tender Mercies	"Over You"	Bobby Hart & Austin Roberts (music & lyrics)
1983 (56th)	Yentl	"Papa, Can You Hear Me?"	Michel Legrand (music); Alan & Marilyn Bergman (lyrics)
1983 (56th)	Yentl	"The Way He Makes Me Feel"	Michel Legrand (music); Alan & Marilyn Bergman (lyrics)
1984 (57th)	The Woman in Red	"I Just Called to Say I Love You"	Stevie Wonder (music & lyrics)
1984 (57th)	Against All Odds	"Against All Odds"	Phil Collins (music & lyrics)
1984 (57th)	Footloose	"Footloose"	Kenny Loggins & Dean Pitchford (music & lyrics)
1984 (57th)	Footloose	"Let's Hear It for the Boy"	Pitchford & Tom Snow (music & lyrics)
1984 (57th)	Ghostbusters	"Ghostbusters"	Ray Parker Jr. (music & lyrics)
1985 (58th)	White Nights	"Say You, Say Me"	Lionel Richie (music & lyrics)
1985 (58th)	Back to the Future	"The Power of Love"	Johnny Colla & Chris Hayes (music); Huey Lewis (lyrics)
1985 (58th)	A Chorus Line	"Surprise, Surprise"	Marvin Hamlisch (music); Ed Kleban (lyrics)
1985 (58th)	The Color Purple	"Sister"	Quincy Jones & Rod Temperton (music); Jones, Richie & Temperton (lyrics)
1985 (58th)	White Nights	"Separate Lives"	Stephen Bishop (music & lyrics)
1986 (59th)	Top Gun	"Take My Breath Away"	Giorgio Moroder (music); Tom Whitlock (lyrics)
1986 (59th)	An American Tail	"Somewhere Out There"	James Horner & Barry Mann (music); Cynthia Weil (lyrics)
1986 (59th)	The Karate Kid Part II	"Glory of Love"	Peter Cetera & David Foster (music); Cetera & Diane Nini (lyrics)
1986 (59th)	Little Shop of Horrors	"Mean Green Mother from Outer Space"	Alan Menken (music); Howard Ashman (lyrics)
1986 (59th)	That's Life!	"Life in a Looking Glass"	Henry Mancini (music); Leslie Bricusse (lyrics)
1987 (60th)	Dirty Dancing	"(I've Had) The Time of My Life"	John DeNicola, Donald Markowitz & Franke Previte (music); Previte (lyrics)
1987 (60th)	Beverly Hills Cop II	"Shakedown"	Harold Faltermeyer & Keith Forsey (music); Faltermeyer, Forsey & Bob Seger (lyrics)
1987 (60th)	Cry Freedom	"Cry Freedom"	George Fenton & Jonas Gwangwa (music & lyrics)
1987 (60th)	Mannequin	"Nothing's Gonna Stop Us Now"	Albert Hammond & Diane Warren (music & lyrics)
1987 (60th)	The Princess Bride	"Storybook Love"	Willy DeVille (music & lyrics)
1988 (61st)	Working Girl	"Let the River Run"	Carly Simon (music & lyrics)
1988 (61st)	Bagdad Cafe	"Calling You"	Bob Telson (music & lyrics)
1988 (61st)	Buster	"Two Hearts"	Lamont Dozier (music); Phil Collins (lyrics)
1989 (62nd)	The Little Mermaid	"Under the Sea"	Alan Menken (music); Howard Ashman (lyrics)
1989 (62nd)	Chances Are	"After All"	Tom Snow (music); Dean Pitchford (lyrics)
1989 (62nd)	The Little Mermaid	"Kiss the Girl"	Menken (music); Ashman (lyrics)
1989 (62nd)	Parenthood	"I Love to See You Smile"	Randy Newman (music & lyrics)
1989 (62nd)	Shirley Valentine	"The Girl Who Used to Be Me"	Marvin Hamlisch (music); Alan Bergman & Marilyn Bergman (lyrics)

=== 1990s ===
Year	Film	Song	Nominees
1990 (63rd)	Dick Tracy	"Sooner or Later"	Stephen Sondheim (music & lyrics)
1990 (63rd)	The Godfather Part III	"Promise Me You'll Remember"	Carmine Coppola (music); John Bettis (lyrics)
1990 (63rd)	Home Alone	"Somewhere in My Memory"	John Williams (music); Leslie Bricusse (lyrics)
1990 (63rd)	Postcards from the Edge	"I'm Checkin' Out"	Shel Silverstein (music & lyrics)
1990 (63rd)	Young Guns II	"Blaze of Glory"	Jon Bon Jovi (music & lyrics)
1991 (64th)
1991 (64th)	Beauty and the Beast	"Beauty and the Beast"	Alan Menken (music); Howard Ashman (p.r.) (lyrics)
1991 (64th)	Beauty and the Beast	"Be Our Guest"	Menken (music); Ashman (p.n.) (lyrics)
1991 (64th)	Beauty and the Beast	"Belle"	Menken (music); Ashman (p.n.) (lyrics)
1991 (64th)	Hook	"When You're Alone"	John Williams (music); Leslie Bricusse (lyrics)
1991 (64th)	Robin Hood: Prince of Thieves	"(Everything I Do) I Do It for You"	Michael Kamen (music); Bryan Adams & Mutt Lange (lyrics)
1992 (65th)
1992 (65th)	Aladdin	"A Whole New World"	Alan Menken (music); Tim Rice (lyrics)
1992 (65th)	Aladdin	"Friend Like Me"	Menken (music); Howard Ashman (p.n.) (lyrics)
1992 (65th)	The Bodyguard	"I Have Nothing"	David Foster (music); Linda Thompson (lyrics)
1992 (65th)	The Bodyguard	"Run to You"	Jud J. Friedman (music); Allan Dennis Rich (lyrics)
1992 (65th)	The Mambo Kings	"Beautiful Maria of My Soul"	Robert Kraft (music); Arne Glimcher (lyrics)
1993 (66th)
1993 (66th)	Philadelphia	"Streets of Philadelphia"	Bruce Springsteen (music & lyrics)
1993 (66th)	Beethoven's 2nd	"The Day I Fall in Love"	James Ingram, Clif Magness & Carole Bayer Sager (music & lyrics)
1993 (66th)	Philadelphia	"Philadelphia"	Neil Young (music & lyrics)
1993 (66th)	Poetic Justice	"Again"	Janet Jackson, Jimmy Jam & Terry Lewis (music & lyrics)
1993 (66th)	Sleepless in Seattle	"A Wink and a Smile"	Marc Shaiman (music); Ramsey McLean (lyrics)
1994 (67th)
1994 (67th)	The Lion King	"Can You Feel the Love Tonight"	Elton John (music); Tim Rice (lyrics)
1994 (67th)	Junior	"Look What Love Has Done"	James Newton Howard, James Ingram, Carole Bayer Sager & Patty Smyth (music & lyrics)
1994 (67th)	The Lion King	"Circle of Life"	Elton John (music); Tim Rice (lyrics)
1994 (67th)	The Lion King	"Hakuna Matata"	Elton John (music); Tim Rice (lyrics)
1994 (67th)	The Paper	"Make Up Your Mind"	Randy Newman (music & lyrics)
1995 (68th)
1995 (68th)	Pocahontas	"Colors of the Wind"	Alan Menken (music); Stephen Schwartz (lyrics)
1995 (68th)	Dead Man Walking	"Dead Man Walkin'"	Bruce Springsteen (music & lyrics)
1995 (68th)	Don Juan DeMarco	"Have You Ever Really Loved a Woman?"	Bryan Adams, Michael Kamen & Mutt Lange (music & lyrics)
1995 (68th)	Sabrina	"Moonlight"	John Williams (music); Alan & Marilyn Bergman (lyrics)
1995 (68th)	Toy Story	"You've Got a Friend in Me"	Randy Newman (music & lyrics)
1996 (69th)
1996 (69th)	Evita	"You Must Love Me"	Andrew Lloyd Webber (music); Tim Rice (lyrics)
1996 (69th)	The Mirror Has Two Faces	"I Finally Found Someone"	Bryan Adams, Marvin Hamlisch, Mutt Lange & Barbra Streisand (music & lyrics)
1996 (69th)	One Fine Day	"For the First Time"	Jud J. Friedman, James Newton Howard & Allan Dennis Rich (music & lyrics)
1996 (69th)	That Thing You Do!	"That Thing You Do!"	Adam Schlesinger (music & lyrics)
1996 (69th)	Up Close and Personal	"Because You Loved Me"	Diane Warren (music & lyrics)
1997 (70th)
1997 (70th)	Titanic	"My Heart Will Go On"	James Horner (music); Will Jennings (lyrics)
1997 (70th)	Anastasia	"Journey to the Past"	Stephen Flaherty (music); Lynn Ahrens (lyrics)
1997 (70th)	Con Air	"How Do I Live"	Diane Warren (music and lyrics)
1997 (70th)	Good Will Hunting	"Miss Misery"	Elliott Smith (music & lyrics)
1997 (70th)	Hercules	"Go the Distance"	Alan Menken (music); David Zippel (lyrics)
1998 (71st)
1998 (71st)	The Prince of Egypt	"When You Believe"	Stephen Schwartz (music & lyrics)
1998 (71st)	Armageddon	"I Don't Want to Miss a Thing"	Diane Warren (music & lyrics)
1998 (71st)	Babe: Pig in the City	"That'll Do"	Randy Newman (music & lyrics)
1998 (71st)	The Horse Whisperer	"A Soft Place to Fall"	Allison Moorer & Gwil Owen (music & lyrics)
1998 (71st)	Quest for Camelot	"The Prayer"	David Foster & Carole Bayer Sager (music); Foster, Tony Renis, Sager & Alberto Testa (lyrics)
1999 (72nd)
1999 (72nd)	Tarzan	"You'll Be in My Heart"	Phil Collins (music & lyrics)
1999 (72nd)	Magnolia	"Save Me"	Aimee Mann (music & lyrics)
1999 (72nd)	Music of the Heart	"Music of My Heart"	Diane Warren (music & lyrics)
1999 (72nd)	South Park: Bigger, Longer & Uncut	"Blame Canada"	Trey Parker & Marc Shaiman (music & lyrics)
1999 (72nd)	Toy Story 2	"When She Loved Me"	Randy Newman (music & lyrics)

=== 2000s ===
Year	Film	Song	Nominees
2000 (73rd)	Wonder Boys	"Things Have Changed"	Bob Dylan (music and lyrics)
2000 (73rd)	Crouching Tiger, Hidden Dragon	"A Love Before Time"	Jorge Calandrelli & Tan Dun (music); James Schamus (lyrics)
2000 (73rd)	Dancer in the Dark	"I've Seen It All"	Björk (music); Sjón & Lars von Trier (lyrics)
2000 (73rd)	The Emperor's New Groove	"My Funny Friend and Me"	Dave Hartley & Sting (music); Sting (lyrics)
2000 (73rd)	Meet the Parents	"A Fool in Love"	Randy Newman (music & lyrics)
2001 (74th)
2001 (74th)	Monsters, Inc.	"If I Didn't Have You"	Randy Newman (music & lyrics)
2001 (74th)	Kate & Leopold	"Until..."	Sting (music & lyrics)
2001 (74th)	The Lord of the Rings: The Fellowship of the Ring	"May It Be"	Enya, Nicky & Roma Ryan (music and lyrics)
2001 (74th)	Pearl Harbor	"There You'll Be"	Diane Warren (music & lyrics)
2001 (74th)	Vanilla Sky	"Vanilla Sky"	Paul McCartney (music & lyrics)
2002 (75th)
2002 (75th)	8 Mile	"Lose Yourself"	Jeff Bass, Eminem & Luis Resto (music); Eminem (lyrics)
2002 (75th)	Chicago	"I Move On"	John Kander (music); Fred Ebb (lyrics)
2002 (75th)	Frida	"Burn It Blue"	Elliot Goldenthal (music); Julie Taymor (lyrics)
2002 (75th)	Gangs of New York	"The Hands That Built America"	U2 (music & lyrics)
2002 (75th)	The Wild Thornberrys Movie	"Father and Daughter"	Paul Simon (music & lyrics)
2003 (76th)
2003 (76th)	The Lord of the Rings: The Return of the King	"Into the West"	Annie Lennox, Howard Shore & Fran Walsh (music & lyrics)
2003 (76th)	Cold Mountain	"Scarlet Tide"	T Bone Burnett & Elvis Costello (music & lyrics)
2003 (76th)	Cold Mountain	"You Will Be My Ain True Love"	Sting (music & lyrics)
2003 (76th)	A Mighty Wind	"A Kiss at the End of the Rainbow"	Michael McKean & Annette O'Toole (music & lyrics)
2003 (76th)	The Triplets of Belleville	"Belleville Rendez-vous"	Benoît Charest (music); Sylvain Chomet (lyrics)
2004 (77th)
2004 (77th)	The Motorcycle Diaries	"Al otro lado del río"	Jorge Drexler (music & lyrics)
2004 (77th)	The Chorus	"Look to Your Path"	Bruno Coulais (music); Christophe Barratier (lyrics)
2004 (77th)	The Phantom of the Opera	"Learn to Be Lonely"	Andrew Lloyd Webber (music); Charles Hart (lyrics)
2004 (77th)	The Polar Express	"Believe"	Glen Ballard & Alan Silvestri (music & lyrics)
2004 (77th)	Shrek 2	"Accidentally in Love"	Counting Crows (music); Adam Duritz & Dan Vickrey (lyrics)
2005 (78th)
2005 (78th)	Hustle & Flow	"It's Hard out Here for a Pimp"	Frayser Boy, Juicy J & DJ Paul (music & lyrics)
2005 (78th)	Crash	"In the Deep"	Michael Becker & Bird York (music); York (lyrics)
2005 (78th)	Transamerica	"Travelin' Thru"	Dolly Parton (music & lyrics)
2006 (79th)
2006 (79th)	An Inconvenient Truth	"I Need to Wake Up"	Melissa Etheridge (music & lyrics)
2006 (79th)	Cars	"Our Town"	Randy Newman (music & lyrics)
2006 (79th)	Dreamgirls	"Listen"	Henry Krieger & Scott Cutler (music); Anne Preven (lyrics)
2006 (79th)	Dreamgirls	"Love You I Do"	Henry Krieger (music); Siedah Garrett (lyrics)
2006 (79th)	Dreamgirls	"Patience"	Henry Krieger (music); Willie Reale (lyrics)
2007 (80th)
2007 (80th)	Once	"Falling Slowly"	Glen Hansard & Markéta Irglová (music & lyrics)
2007 (80th)	Enchanted	"Happy Working Song"	Alan Menken (music); Stephen Schwartz (lyrics)
2007 (80th)	Enchanted	"So Close"	Alan Menken (music); Stephen Schwartz (lyrics)
2007 (80th)	Enchanted	"That's How You Know"	Alan Menken (music); Stephen Schwartz (lyrics)
2007 (80th)	August Rush	"Raise It Up"	Jamal Joseph, Charles Mack & Tevin Thomas (music & lyrics)
2008 (81st)
2008 (81st)	Slumdog Millionaire	"Jai Ho"	A. R. Rahman (music); Gulzar (lyrics)
2008 (81st)	Slumdog Millionaire	"O... Saya"	Rahman & M.I.A. (music & lyrics)
2008 (81st)	WALL-E	"Down to Earth"	Peter Gabriel & Thomas Newman (music); Gabriel (lyrics)
2009 (82nd)
2009 (82nd)	Crazy Heart	"The Weary Kind"	Ryan Bingham & T Bone Burnett (music & lyrics)
2009 (82nd)	Nine	"Take It All"	Maury Yeston (music & lyrics)
2009 (82nd)	Paris 36	"Loin de Paname"	Reinhardt Wagner (music); Frank Thomas (lyrics)
2009 (82nd)	The Princess and the Frog	"Almost There"	Randy Newman (music & lyrics)
2009 (82nd)	The Princess and the Frog	"Down in New Orleans"	Randy Newman (music & lyrics)

=== 2010s ===
Year	Film	Song	Nominees
2010 (83rd)	Toy Story 3	"We Belong Together"	Randy Newman (music & lyrics)
2010 (83rd)	127 Hours	"If I Rise"	A. R. Rahman (music); Dido & Rollo (lyrics)
2010 (83rd)	Country Strong	"Coming Home"	Tom Douglas, Hillary Lindsey & Troy Verges (music & lyrics)
2010 (83rd)	Tangled	"I See the Light"	Alan Menken (music); Glenn Slater (lyrics)
2011 (84th)
2011 (84th)	The Muppets	"Man or Muppet"	Bret McKenzie (music & lyrics)
2011 (84th)	Rio	"Real in Rio"	Carlinhos Brown & Sérgio Mendes (music); Siedah Garrett (lyrics)
2012 (85th)
2012 (85th)	Skyfall	"Skyfall"	Adele & Paul Epworth (music & lyrics)
2012 (85th)	Chasing Ice	"Before My Time"	J. Ralph (music & lyrics)
2012 (85th)	Les Misérables	"Suddenly"	Claude-Michel Schönberg (music); Alain Boublil & Herbert Kretzmer (lyrics)
2012 (85th)	Life of Pi	"Pi's Lullaby"	Mychael Danna (music); Bombay Jayashri (lyrics)
2012 (85th)	Ted	"Everybody Needs a Best Friend"	Walter Murphy (music); Seth MacFarlane (lyrics)
2013 (86th) (Note: On January 29, 2014, a nomination for "Alone yet Not Alone" from the film of the same name, with music by Bruce Broughton and lyrics by Dennis Spiegel, was revoked prior to voting. The Academy concluded that Broughton's campaigning via personal communication with music branch members was inconsistent with promotional regulations.)
2013 (86th)	Frozen	"Let It Go"	Kristen Anderson-Lopez & Robert Lopez (music & lyrics)
2013 (86th)	Despicable Me 2	"Happy"	Pharrell Williams (music & lyrics)
2013 (86th)	Her	"The Moon Song"	Karen O (music); Spike Jonze & O (lyrics)
2013 (86th)	Mandela: Long Walk to Freedom	"Ordinary Love"	U2 (music); Bono (lyrics)
2014 (87th)
2014 (87th)	Selma	"Glory"	Common & John Legend (music & lyrics)
2014 (87th)	Begin Again	"Lost Stars"	Gregg Alexander & Danielle Brisebois (music & lyrics)
2014 (87th)	Beyond the Lights	"Grateful"	Diane Warren (music & lyrics)
2014 (87th)	Glen Campbell: I'll Be Me	"I'm Not Gonna Miss You"	Glen Campbell & Julian Raymond (music & lyrics)
2014 (87th)	The Lego Movie	"Everything Is Awesome"	Shawn Patterson (music & lyrics)
2015 (88th)
2015 (88th)	Spectre	"Writing's on the Wall"	Jimmy Napes & Sam Smith (music & lyrics)
2015 (88th)	Fifty Shades of Grey	"Earned It"	Belly, DaHeala, Stephan Moccio & The Weeknd (music & lyrics)
2015 (88th)	The Hunting Ground	"Til It Happens to You"	Lady Gaga & Diane Warren (music & lyrics)
2015 (88th)	Racing Extinction	"Manta Ray"	J. Ralph (music); Anohni (lyrics)
2015 (88th)	Youth	"Simple Song #3"	David Lang (music & lyrics)
2016 (89th)
2016 (89th)	La La Land	"City of Stars"	Justin Hurwitz (music); Pasek & Paul (lyrics)
2016 (89th)	Jim: The James Foley Story	"The Empty Chair"	J. Ralph & Sting (music & lyrics)
2016 (89th)	La La Land	"Audition (The Fools Who Dream)"	Hurwitz (music); Pasek & Paul (lyrics)
2016 (89th)	Moana	"How Far I'll Go"	Lin-Manuel Miranda (music & lyrics)
2016 (89th)	Trolls	"Can't Stop the Feeling!"	Max Martin, Shellback & Justin Timberlake (music & lyrics)
2017 (90th)
2017 (90th)	Coco	"Remember Me"	Kristen Anderson-Lopez & Robert Lopez (music & lyrics)
2017 (90th)	Call Me by Your Name	"Mystery of Love"	Sufjan Stevens (music & lyrics)
2017 (90th)	The Greatest Showman	"This Is Me"	Pasek & Paul (music & lyrics)
2017 (90th)	Marshall	"Stand Up for Something"	Diane Warren (music); Common & Warren (lyrics)
2017 (90th)	Mudbound	"Mighty River"	Mary J. Blige, Raphael Saadiq & Taura Stinson (music & lyrics)
2018 (91st)
2018 (91st)	A Star Is Born	"Shallow"	Lady Gaga, Mark Ronson, Anthony Rossomando & Andrew Wyatt (music & lyrics)
2018 (91st)	The Ballad of Buster Scruggs	"When a Cowboy Trades His Spurs for Wings"	David Rawlings & Gillian Welch (music & lyrics)
2018 (91st)	Black Panther	"All the Stars"	Kendrick Lamar, Sounwave & Anthony Tiffith (music); Lamar, SZA & Tiffith (lyrics)
2018 (91st)	Mary Poppins Returns	"The Place Where Lost Things Go"	Marc Shaiman (music); Shaiman & Scott Wittman (lyrics)
2018 (91st)	RBG	"I'll Fight"	Diane Warren (music & lyrics)
2019 (92nd)
2019 (92nd)	Rocketman	"(I'm Gonna) Love Me Again"	Elton John (music); Bernie Taupin (lyrics)
2019 (92nd)	Breakthrough	"I'm Standing with You"	Diane Warren (music & lyrics)
2019 (92nd)	Frozen 2	"Into the Unknown"	Kristen Anderson-Lopez & Robert Lopez (music & lyrics)
2019 (92nd)	Harriet	"Stand Up"	Joshuah Brian Campbell & Cynthia Erivo (music & lyrics)
2019 (92nd)	Toy Story 4	"I Can't Let You Throw Yourself Away"	Randy Newman (music & lyrics)

=== 2020s ===
Year	Film	Song	Nominees
2020/21 (93rd)	Judas and the Black Messiah	"Fight for You"	D'Mile & H.E.R. (music); H.E.R. & Tiara Thomas (lyrics)
2020/21 (93rd)	Eurovision Song Contest: The Story of Fire Saga	"Husavik"	Rickard Göransson, Fat Max Gsus & Savan Kotecha (music & lyrics)
2020/21 (93rd)	The Life Ahead	"Io sì (Seen)"	Diane Warren (music); Laura Pausini & Warren (lyrics)
2020/21 (93rd)	One Night in Miami...	"Speak Now"	Sam Ashworth & Leslie Odom Jr. (music & lyrics)
2020/21 (93rd)	The Trial of the Chicago 7	"Hear My Voice"	Daniel Pemberton (music); Celeste & Pemberton (lyrics)
2021 (94th)	No Time to Die	"No Time to Die"	Billie Eilish & Finneas O'Connell (music & lyrics)
2021 (94th)	Belfast	"Down to Joy"	Van Morrison (music & lyrics)
2021 (94th)	Encanto	"Dos Oruguitas"	Lin-Manuel Miranda (music & lyrics)
2021 (94th)	Four Good Days	"Somehow You Do"	Diane Warren (music & lyrics)
2021 (94th)	King Richard	"Be Alive"	Beyoncé & Dixson (music & lyrics)
2022 (95th)	RRR	"Naatu Naatu"	M. M. Keeravani (music); Chandrabose (lyrics)
2022 (95th)	Black Panther: Wakanda Forever	"Lift Me Up"	Ryan Coogler, Ludwig Göransson, Rihanna & Tems (music); Coogler & Tems (lyrics)
2022 (95th)	Everything Everywhere All at Once	"This Is a Life"	David Byrne, Ryan Lott & Mitski (music); Byrne & Lott (lyrics)
2022 (95th)	Tell It Like a Woman	"Applause"	Diane Warren (music & lyrics)
2022 (95th)	Top Gun: Maverick	"Hold My Hand"	BloodPop & Lady Gaga (music & lyrics)
2023 (96th)	Barbie	"What Was I Made For?"	Billie Eilish & Finneas O'Connell (music & lyrics)
2023 (96th)	American Symphony	"It Never Went Away"	Jon Batiste & Dan Wilson (music & lyrics)
2023 (96th)	Barbie	"I'm Just Ken"	Mark Ronson & Andrew Wyatt (music & lyrics)
2023 (96th)	Flamin' Hot	"The Fire Inside"	Diane Warren (music & lyrics)
2023 (96th)	Killers of the Flower Moon	"Wahzhazhe (A Song for My People)"	Scott George (music & lyrics)
2024 (97th)	Emilia Pérez	"El Mal"	Camille & Clément Ducol (music); Jacques Audiard, Camille & Ducol (lyrics)
2024 (97th)	Elton John: Never Too Late	"Never Too Late"	Brandi Carlile, Elton John, Bernie Taupin & Watt (music & lyrics)
2024 (97th)	Emilia Pérez	"Mi camino"	Camille & Ducol (music & lyrics)
2024 (97th)	Sing Sing	"Like a Bird"	Abraham Alexander & Adrian Quesada (music & lyrics)
2024 (97th)	The Six Triple Eight	"The Journey"	Diane Warren (music & lyrics)
2025 (98th)	KPop Demon Hunters	"Golden"	Ejae, Mark Sonnenblick, Joong Gyu-kwak, Yu Han Lee, Hee Dong Nam, Jeong Hoon Seo & Teddy Park (music & lyrics)
2025 (98th)	Diane Warren: Relentless	"Dear Me"	Diane Warren (music & lyrics)
2025 (98th)	Sinners	"I Lied to You"	Ludwig Göransson & Raphael Saadiq (music & lyrics)
2025 (98th)	Train Dreams	"Train Dreams"	Nick Cave & Bryce Dessner (music); Cave (lyrics)
2025 (98th)	Viva Verdi!	"Sweet Dreams of Joy"	Nicholas Pike (music & lyrics)

== Shortlisted finalists ==
Finalists for Best Original Song are selected by the Music Branch. Currently, the fifteen songs receiving the highest number of votes shall advance to the next round of voting. The following is a tabulation of songs that were shortlisted but not nominated, by year.

Year	Finalists	Ref
1965	"Baby the Rain Must Fall" from Baby the Rain Must Fall, "You're Gonna Hear from Me" from Inside Daisy Clover, "Never Too Late" from Never Too Late, "That Darn Cat!" from That Darn Cat!, and "Where's the Love" from The Umbrellas of Cherbourg	
1966	"Any Wednesday" from Any Wednesday, "Moment to Moment" from Moment to Moment, "I'll Be Back" from Spinout, "Wish Me a Rainbow" from This Property Is Condemned, and "In the Arms of Love" from What Did You Do in the War, Daddy?	
1967	"Barefoot in the Park" from Barefoot in the Park, "When I Look in Your Eyes" from Doctor Dolittle, "The Happening" from The Happening, "In the Heat of the Night" from In the Heat of the Night, and "Wait Until Dark" from Wait Until Dark	
1968	"The Way That I Live" from The Bliss of Mrs. Blossom, "A Flea in Her Ear" from A Flea in Her Ear, "I Love You, Alice B. Toklas" from I Love You, Alice B. Toklas, "Dakota" from The One and Only, Genuine, Original Family Band, "Springtime for Hitler" from The Producers	
1969	"Ballad of Easy Rider" from Easy Rider, "There's Enough to Go Around" from Gaily, Gaily, "Fill the World with Love" from Goodbye, Mr. Chips, "A Lonely Place" from Heaven with a Gun, and "The Song of Santa Vittoria" from The Secret of Santa Vittoria	
1970	"Everybody Wants to Be a Cat" from The Aristocats, "Dirty Dingus Magee" from Dirty Dingus Magee, "Burning Bridges" from Kelly's Heroes, "Let It Be" from Let It Be, and "Suicide Is Painless" from M*A*S*H	
1971	"Believe in Me" from Believe in Me, "Can It Be True" from The Marriage of a Young Stockbroker, "Chilly Winds" from Pretty Maids All in a Row, "Do Your Thing" from Shaft, and "Girl" from Star Spangled Girl	
1972	"Moreover and Me" from The Biscuit Eater, "Theme from The Heartbreak Kid" from The Heartbreak Kid, "Silent Running" from Silent Running, (Note: The shortlisted song "Freddie's Dead" from Super Fly was removed from the list prior to voting because only an instrumental version was featured in the film. A revoting process led to the title song from Silent Running being named as a replacement.) "Snoopy Come Home" from Snoopy Come Home, and "Serenade of Love" from Travels with My Aunt	
1973	"I Got a Name" from The Last American Hero, "Send a Little Love My Way" from Oklahoma Crude, "Are You Man Enough" from Shaft in Africa, (Note: The shortlisted song "Remembering" from England Made Me was removed from the list prior to voting because the song was only featured over the end credits, in violation of the rules at the time requiring it be used in the body of the film. "Are You Man Enough" from Shaft in Africa was named as a replacement.) "River Song" from Tom Sawyer, and "A Touch of Class" from A Touch of Class	
1974	"The Next Time Around" from The Dion Brothers, "Gold" from Gold, "How to Seduce a Woman" from How to Seduce a Woman, "Freedom" from Huckleberry Finn, and "I Never Met a Rose" from The Little Prince	
1975	"Lady of the Wilderness" from Gifts of an Eagle, "Let's Do It Again" from Let's Do It Again, "Somewhere" from Mister Quilp, "Once Is Not Enough" from Once Is Not Enough, and "Only a Dream Away" from Seven Alone	
1976	"Lemon Drops, Lollipops and Sunbeams" from The Duchess and the Dirtwater Fox, "I'd Like to Be You for a Day" from Freaky Friday, "The Time Has Come" from Joe Panther, and "I Believe in Love" and "With One More Look at You" from A Star Is Born	
1977	"Theme from New York, New York" from New York, New York and "What Was" from The Late Show	
1978	"Children of Sanchez" from The Children of Sanchez, (Note: The shortlisted song "The Love I Have for You" from Remember My Name was removed from the list prior to voting because the Academy learned it was at least 30 years old. The title song from The Children of Sanchez was named as a replacement.) "The One and Only" from The One and Only, "Move 'Em Out" from Revenge of the Pink Panther, "Can You Read My Mind?" from Superman, and "Bright Eyes" from Watership Down	
1979	"I'm on Your Side" from Chapter Two, "I Hope That Somethin' Better Comes Along," "Movin' Right Along" and "Never Before, Never Again" from The Muppet Movie, and "Sold My Soul to Rock 'N' Roll" from The Rose	
2018	"Treasure" from Beautiful Boy, "Revelation" from Boy Erased, "Girl in the Movies" from Dumplin', "We Won't Move" from The Hate U Give, "Trip a Little Light Fantastic" from Mary Poppins Returns, "Keep Reachin'" from Quincy, "A Place Called Slaughter Race" from Ralph Breaks the Internet, "OYAHYTT" from Sorry to Bother You, "Suspirium" from Suspiria, and "The Big Unknown" from Widows	
2019	"Speechless" from Aladdin, "Letter to My Godfather" from The Black Godfather, "Da Bronx" from The Bronx USA, "Catchy Song" from The Lego Movie 2: The Second Part, "Never Too Late" and "Spirit" from The Lion King, "Daily Battles" from Motherless Brooklyn, "A Glass of Soju" from Parasite, "High Above the Water" from Toni Morrison: The Pieces I Am, and "Glasgow" from Wild Rose	
2020/21	"Turntables" from All In: The Fight for Democracy, "See What You've Done" from Belly of the Beast, "Wuhan Flu" from Borat Subsequent Moviefilm, "Never Break" from Giving Voice, "Make It Work" from Jingle Jangle: A Christmas Journey, "Rain Song" from Minari, "Show Me Your Soul" from Mr. Soul!, "Loyal Brave True" from Mulan, "Free" from The One and Only Ivan, and "Green" from Sound of Metal	
2021	"So May We Start?" from Annette, "Right Where I Belong" from Brian Wilson: Long Promised Road, "Automatic Woman" from Bruised, "Dream Girl" from Cinderella, "Beyond the Shore" from CODA, "The Anonymous Ones" from Dear Evan Hansen, "Just Look Up" from Don't Look Up, "Guns Go Bang" from The Harder They Fall, "Here I Am (Singing My Way Home)" from Respect, and "Your Song Saved My Life" from Sing 2	
2022	"Time" from Amsterdam, "Nothing Is Lost (You Give Me Strength)" from Avatar: The Way of Water, "Ciao Papa" from Guillermo del Toro's Pinocchio, "Til You're Home" from A Man Called Otto, "My Mind & Me" from Selena Gomez: My Mind & Me, "Good Afternoon" from Spirited, "Stand Up" from Till, "Dust & Ash" from The Voice of Dust and Ash, "Carolina" from Where the Crawdads Sing, and "New Body Rhumba" from White Noise	
2023	"Dear Alien (Who Art in Heaven)" from Asteroid City, "Dance the Night" from Barbie, "Keep It Movin'" and "Superpower (I)" from The Color Purple, "High Life" and "Meet in the Middle" from Flora and Son, "Can't Catch Me Now" from The Hunger Games: The Ballad of Songbirds & Snakes, "Quiet Eyes" from Past Lives, "Road to Freedom" from Rustin, and "Am I Dreaming" from Spider-Man: Across the Spider-Verse	
2024	"Winter Coat" from Blitz, "Compress/Repress" from Challengers, "Sick in the Head" from Kneecap, "Beyond" from Moana 2, "Tell Me It's You" from Mufasa: The Lion King, "Piece by Piece" from Piece by Piece, "Out of Oklahoma" from Twisters, "Kiss the Sky" from The Wild Robot, and "Harper and Will Go West" from Will & Harper (Note: The shortlisted song "Forbidden Road" from Better Man was removed from the list prior to voting because the Academy concluded that the song contained elements of the song "I Got a Name" by Charles Fox and Norman Gimbel.)	
2025	"Dream as One" from Avatar: Fire and Ash, "Our Love" from The Ballad of Wallis Island, "Dying to Live" from Billy Idol Should Be Dead, "Salt Then Sour Then Sweet" from Come See Me in the Good Light, "Drive" from F1, "Highest 2 Lowest" from Highest 2 Lowest, "Last Time (I Seen the Sun)" from Sinners, "As Alive as You Need Me to Be" from Tron: Ares, and "The Girl in the Bubble" and "No Place Like Home" from Wicked: For Good	

== Records ==
=== Age superlatives ===
Record	Songwriter	Song	Film	Age
Oldest winner	Gulzar	"Jai Ho"	Slumdog Millionaire	74 years, 188 days
Oldest nominee	Herbert Kretzmer	"Suddenly"	Les Misérables	87 years, 97 days
Youngest winner	Markéta Irglová	"Falling Slowly"	Once	19 years, 361 days
Youngest nominee	Markéta Irglová	"Falling Slowly"	Once	19 years, 328 days

=== Winners of multiple awards ===
Number of nominations in parentheses

- 4: Sammy Cahn (25) (lyricist)
- 4: Johnny Mercer (18) (16 as lyricist, 2 as composer and lyricist)
- 4: Alan Menken (14) (composer)
- 4: Jimmy Van Heusen (14) (composer)
- 3: Paul Francis Webster (16) (lyricist)
- 3: Harry Warren (11) (composer)
- 3: Ray Evans (7) (composer and lyricist)
- 3: Jay Livingston (7) (composer and lyricist)
- 3: Tim Rice (5) (lyricist)
- 2: Alan and Marilyn Bergman (15) (lyricist)
- 2: Randy Newman (13) (composer and lyricist)
- 2: Henry Mancini (11) (composer)
- 2: Ned Washington (11) (lyricist)
- 2: Sammy Fain (10) (composer)
- 2: Howard Ashman (7) (lyricist)
- 2: Jerome Kern (7) (composer)
- 2: Burt Bacharach (5) (composer)
- 2: Oscar Hammerstein II (5) (lyricist)
- 2: Stephen Schwartz (5) (1 as lyricist, 1 as composer and lyricist)
- 2: Elton John (5) (composer)
- 2: Joel Hirschhorn (3) (composer and lyricist)
- 2: Will Jennings (3) (lyricist)
- 2: Al Kasha (3) (composer and lyricist)
- 2: Kristen Anderson-Lopez (3) (composer and lyricist)
- 2: Robert Lopez (3) (composer and lyricist)
- 2: Giorgio Moroder (2) (composer)
- 2: Billie Eilish (2) (composer and lyricist)
- 2: Finneas O'Connell (2) (composer and lyricist)

=== Most nominations without a win ===
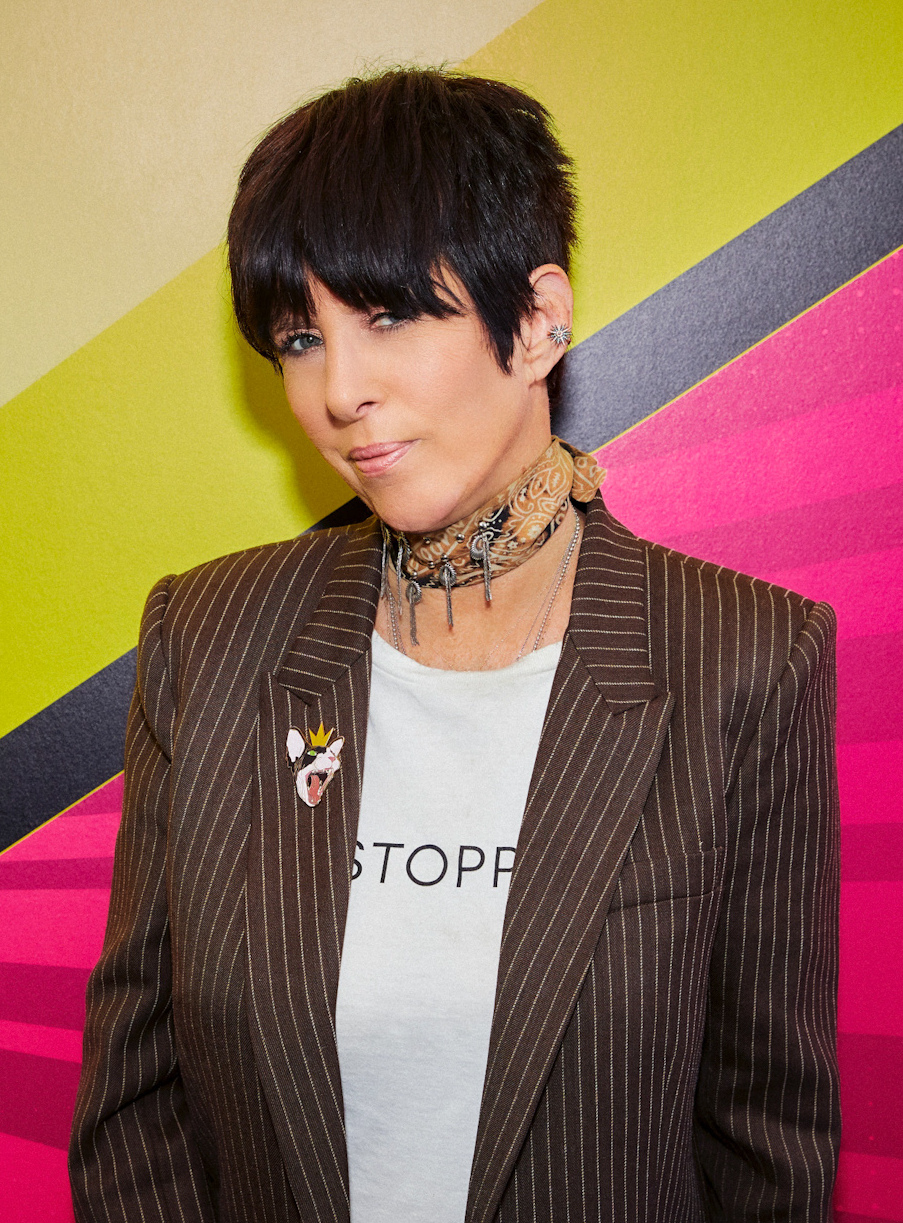
Diane Warren has seventeen Best Original Song nominations, but has never won the award.

- 17: Diane Warren (composer and lyricist)
- 8: Mack David (lyricist)
- 5: Harold Adamson (lyricist)
- 5: Nicholas Brodszky (composer)
- 5: Jimmy McHugh (composer)
- 5: John Williams (composer)
- 4: Elmer Bernstein (composer)
- 4: James V. Monaco (composer)
- 4: Cole Porter (composer and lyricist)
- 4: Sting (composer and lyricist)
- 3: Bryan Adams (composer and lyricist)
- 3: Jack Brooks (composer and lyricist)
- 3: George Forrest (lyricist)
- 3: David Foster (composer)
- 3: Kim Gannon (lyricist)
- 3: Ira Gershwin (lyricist)
- 3: Quincy Jones (composer)
- 3: Henry Krieger (composer)
- 3: Robert John "Mutt" Lange (composer and lyricist)
- 3: Jerry Livingston (composer)
- 3: Dory Previn (lyricist)
- 3: J. Ralph (composer)
- 3: Marc Shaiman (composer and lyricist)
- 3: Robert Wright (lyricist)
- 3: Victor Young (composer)
- 2: Ralph Blane (lyricist)
- 2: Frank Churchill (composer)
- 2: Carol Connors (composer and lyricist)
- 2: Bill Conti (composer)
- 2: Fred Ebb (lyricist)
- 2: Roger Edens (composer)
- 2: Eliot Daniel (composer and lyricist)
- 2: Sylvia Fine (composer and lyricist)
- 2: Charles Fox (composer)
- 2: Siedah Garrett (lyricist)
- 2: Friedrich Hollaender (composer)
- 2: James Ingram (composer and lyricist)
- 2: Michael Kamen (composer)
- 2: John Kander (composer)
- 2: Burton Lane (composer)
- 2: Hugh Martin (composer)
- 2: Paul McCartney (composer and lyricist)
- 2: Lin-Manuel Miranda (composer and lyricist)
- 2: Larry Morey (lyricist)
- 2: Alfred Newman (composer)
- 2: Lionel Newman (composer)
- 2: James Newton Howard (composer)
- 2: Dolly Parton (composer and lyricist)
- 2: André Previn (composer)
- 2: Don Raye (composer)
- 2: Ayn Robbins (composer and lyricist)
- 2: Bob Russell (lyricist)
- 2: Tom Snow (composer)
- 2: U2 (composer and lyricist)

=== Foreign-language song winners ===
The award has only been given to songs in languages other than English five times: in 1960 for "Never on Sunday" (Greek title "Ta Pediá tou Pireá") from Never on Sunday, in 2004 for the Spanish song "Al otro lado del río" from The Motorcycle Diaries, in 2008 for the Hindi song "Jai Ho" from Slumdog Millionaire, in 2022 for the Telugu song "Naatu Naatu" from RRR, and in 2024 for the Spanish song "El Mal" from Emilia Pérez.

- Manos Hatzidakis was the first to receive this award for a song originally written in a language other than English, in 1960 for "Never on Sunday" (Greek title "Ta Paidia toy Peiraia") from the Greek film Never on Sunday (Greek title Pote tin Kyriaki).
- Jorge Drexler was the second foreign language songwriter to win the Best Original Song Oscar, for "Al otro lado del río" from The Motorcycle Diaries in 2004. That year another foreign language writing pair were nominated, composer Bruno Coulais and lyricist Christophe Barratier for "Look to Your Path" from the French film The Chorus.
- A. R. Rahman and Gulzar are the third and fourth foreign language composer and songwriter to win in the Best Original Song category, which they shared for the Hindi song "Jai Ho" from Slumdog Millionaire, at the 81st Academy Awards in 2008. That same year, "O... Saya", another partly Hindi song from the same film by Rahman and M.I.A., was also nominated, making it the first time two foreign language songs from the same film were nominated in the category.
- M. M. Keeravani and Chandrabose are the fifth and sixth foreign language composer and songwriter respectively to win in the Best Original Song category, which they shared for the Telugu song "Naatu Naatu" from RRR, at the 95th Academy Awards in 2022.
- Camille, Clément Ducol, and Jacques Audiard are the seventh, eighth, and ninth foreign language composers and songwriters to win in the Best Original Song category, which they shared for the Spanish song "El Mal" from Emilia Pérez, at the 97th Academy Awards in 2024. Despite the song being in Spanish, all of the composers are French.

== See also ==
- Critics' Choice Movie Award for Best Song
- Golden Globe Award for Best Original Song
- Grammy Award for Best Song Written for Visual Media
- List of Academy Award–nominated films
