= Goat Mountain =

Goat Mountain may refer to:

== United States ==
(In the United States alone, the USGS identifies over 20 summits named "Goat Mountain".)

- Goat Mountain (Alaska), in the Chugach Mountains
- Goat Mountain (Cordova), Chugach Mountains of Alaska
- Goat Mountain (Fresno County, California), in Kings Canyon National Park
- Goat Mountain (Madera County, California)
- Goat Mountain (Blaine County, Idaho)
- Goat Mountain in Beaverhead County, Montana
- Goat Mountain in Blaine County, Montana
- Goat Mountain (Glacier County, Montana) (located in Glacier National Park)
- Goat Mountain in Granite County, Montana
- Goat Mountain in McCone County, Montana
- Goat Mountain in Meagher County, Montana
- Goat Mountain in Mineral County, Montana
- Goat Mountain in Missoula County, Montana
- Goat Mountain in Silver Bow County, Montana - see List of mountains in Silver Bow County, Montana
- Goat Mountain (Brewster County, Texas), in Big Bend National Park
- Goat Mountain (Whatcom County) Washington state

== Other ==
- Goat Mountain (Antarctica) in Victoria Land, Antarctica
- Goat Mountain (Canada) in the Cayoosh Range, British Columbia, Canada - see Highest mountain peaks of Canada
- Goat Mountain (Vancouver, British Columbia), Canada
- Goat Mountain in Cherryville, British Columbia - see List of mountains of Canada
- Goat Mountain Wind Ranch, a wind farm in Texas

== See also ==
- Goat Peak (British Columbia), Canada
- Goat Peak, Washington, United States
- Goat Fell, the highest point on the Isle of Arran, Scotland
- Mountain goat (disambiguation)
