= Mountain goat (disambiguation) =

A mountain goat is a mammal species of the genus Oreamnos found in North America.

Mountain goat may also refer to the following other mammals:

- Altai Mountain goat, a breed of domestic goat
- Chamois, a species of goat-antelope that dwells in mountainous habitats
- Harrington's mountain goat, an extinct relative of the North American mountain goats
- The various ibex wild goat species, including the Asian ibex, Alpine ibex, Bezoar ibex, Iberian ibex, Nubian ibex, Sindh ibex, and Walia or Ethiopian ibex, all of which inhabit mountain ranges and mountainous habitats
- Barbary sheep, a species of caprine mostly native to the mountains in North Africa
- Bighorn sheep, a species of goat-like wild sheep native to the mountains of western North America
- Dall sheep, a species of goat-like wild sheep native to the mountains of western North America
- Markhor, a wild goat species native to the mountains of Central Asia and the Himalayas
- Bharal, a caprine species native to the Himalayan mountains
- Tahr, various goat-like species found in the mountains of Asia
- Takin, also known as the cattle chamois or gnu goat, a species of Caprinae found in the eastern Himalayan mountains
- The West Caucasian tur and East Caucasian tur, caprines native to the Caucasus Mountains
- Wild goats that inhabit mountainous environments

Mountain goat may also refer to:

- Kinetic Mountain Goat, a small airplane
- The Mountain Goats, an American indie rock band
- Mountain Goat (bus company), a bus company in Cumbria, England
- Mountain Goat (motor cycle), a 1960s off-road New Zealand farm bike
- Mountain Goat Beer, an Australian microbrewery
- The Mountain Goats, a fictional college football team in Blue Mountain State
- Mountain Goats (TV series), 2015 British sitcom

== See also ==
- Goat Mountain (disambiguation)
- Capra (genus), a genus of goats including the Eurasian mountain goats
- Dahu, a legendary Alpine goat-like creature with left and right legs of different lengths
- Tahr, a Himalayan ungulate
