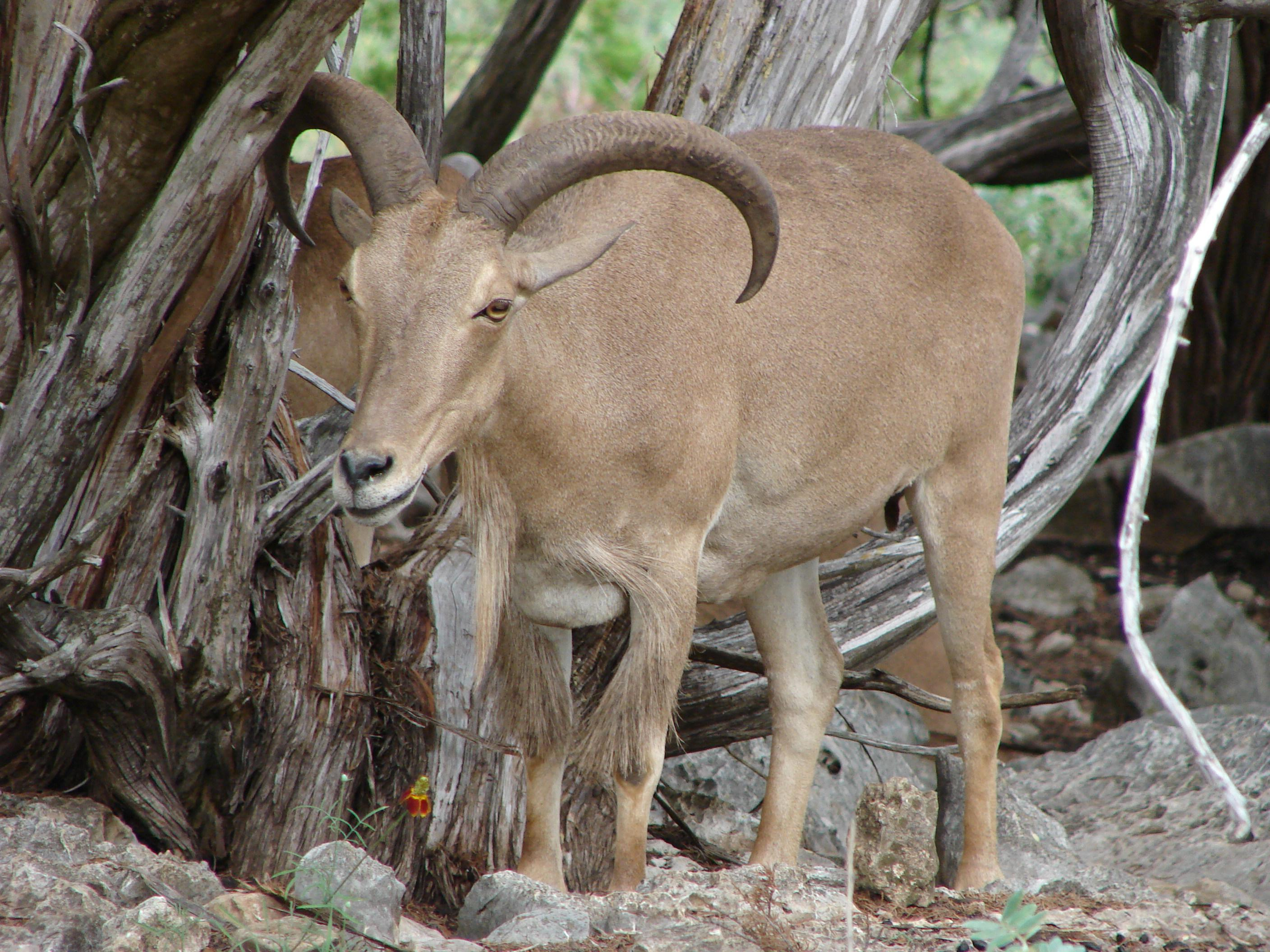

Conservation status
- Vulnerable (IUCN 3.1)
- CITES Appendix II

Scientific classification
- Kingdom: Animalia
- Phylum: Chordata
- Class: Mammalia
- Order: Artiodactyla
- Family: Bovidae
- Subfamily: Caprinae
- Tribe: Caprini
- Genus: Ammotragus (Blyth, 1840)
- Species: A. lervia

Binomial name
- Ammotragus lervia (Pallas, 1777)

Subspecies
- A. l. angusi Rothschild, 1921; A. l. blainei Rothschild, 1913; A. l. lervia Pallas, 1777; A. l. fassini Lepri, 1930; A. l. ornatus I. Geoffroy Saint-Hilaire, 1827; A. l. sahariensis Rothschild, 1913
- Range of Ammotragus lervia Extant (resident) Possibly extant (resident) Extant and reintroduced (resident) Possibly extinct Presence uncertain

Synonyms
- Antilope lervia; Capra lervia; Ovis lervia

= Barbary sheep =

Species of wild sheep native to Africa

The Barbary sheep (Ammotragus lervia), also known as aoudad (pronounced [ˈɑʊdæd]), is a species of caprine native to rocky mountains in North Africa and parts of West Africa. While this is the only species in genus Ammotragus, six subspecies have been described. Although it is rare in its native North Africa, it has been introduced to North America, southern Europe, and elsewhere. It is also known in Berber languages as waddan or arwi, and in former French territories as the mouflon.

== Description ==
Barbary sheep stand 75 to 110 cm (2 ft 6 in to 3 ft 7 in) tall at the shoulder, with a length around 1.5 m (5 ft), and weigh 30 to 145 kg (66 to 320 lb). They are sandy-brown, darkening with age, with a slightly lighter underbelly and a darker line along the back. Upper parts and the outer parts of the legs are a uniform reddish- or grayish-brown. Some shaggy hair is on the throat (extending down to the chest in males) with a sparse mane. Their horns have a triangular cross-section. The horns curve outward, backward, then inward, and can exceed 76 cm (30 in) in length. The horns are fairly smooth, with slight wrinkles evident at the base as the animal matures.

== Range ==
=== Natural range ===
Barbary sheep are endemic to regions of Northern Africa primarily surrounding the barren center of the Sahara. Countries and territories where aoudad may be found include Algeria, Chad (north), Egypt, Libya, Mali (north), Mauritania, Morocco, Niger, Tunisia and Western Sahara. West of the Nile, they can be found in Sudan; east of the Nile, in the Red Sea Hills. The now-extinct Ancient Egyptian corkscrew-horned sheep (Ovis longipes palaeoaegyptiacus) was also thought to be a subspecies of wild barbary sheep.

Populations within its native range have been decreasing due to hunting, legal and otherwise, and destruction of habitat.

=== Introduced populations ===
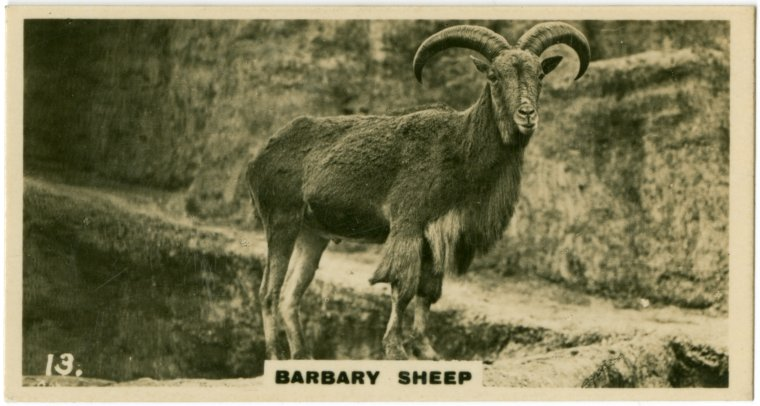
Barbary sheep at London Zoo

Barbary sheep have been introduced to southeastern Spain and the Southwestern United States.

They have become common in a limited region of southeastern Spain, since its introduction in 1970 to Sierra Espuña Regional Park as a game species. Its adaptability enabled it to colonize nearby areas quickly, and private game estates provided other centers of dispersion. The species is currently expanding, according to recent field surveys, now being found in the provinces of Alicante, Almería, Granada, and Murcia. The species is a potential competitor to native ungulates inhabiting the Iberian Peninsula; it has also been introduced to La Palma (in the Canary Islands) and has spread throughout the northern and central parts of the island, where it is a serious threat to endemic vegetation. The aoudad has also been introduced in Croatia several times, where a population exists in Mosor.

During the winter of 1957-1958, 42 Barbary sheep were released in the Palo Duro Canyon of Texas for the purpose of attracting hunters to the region.

Although the species has not yet been recorded in Australia, it is considered a pest species in Queensland, with the potential to establish in the wild.

== Taxonomy ==
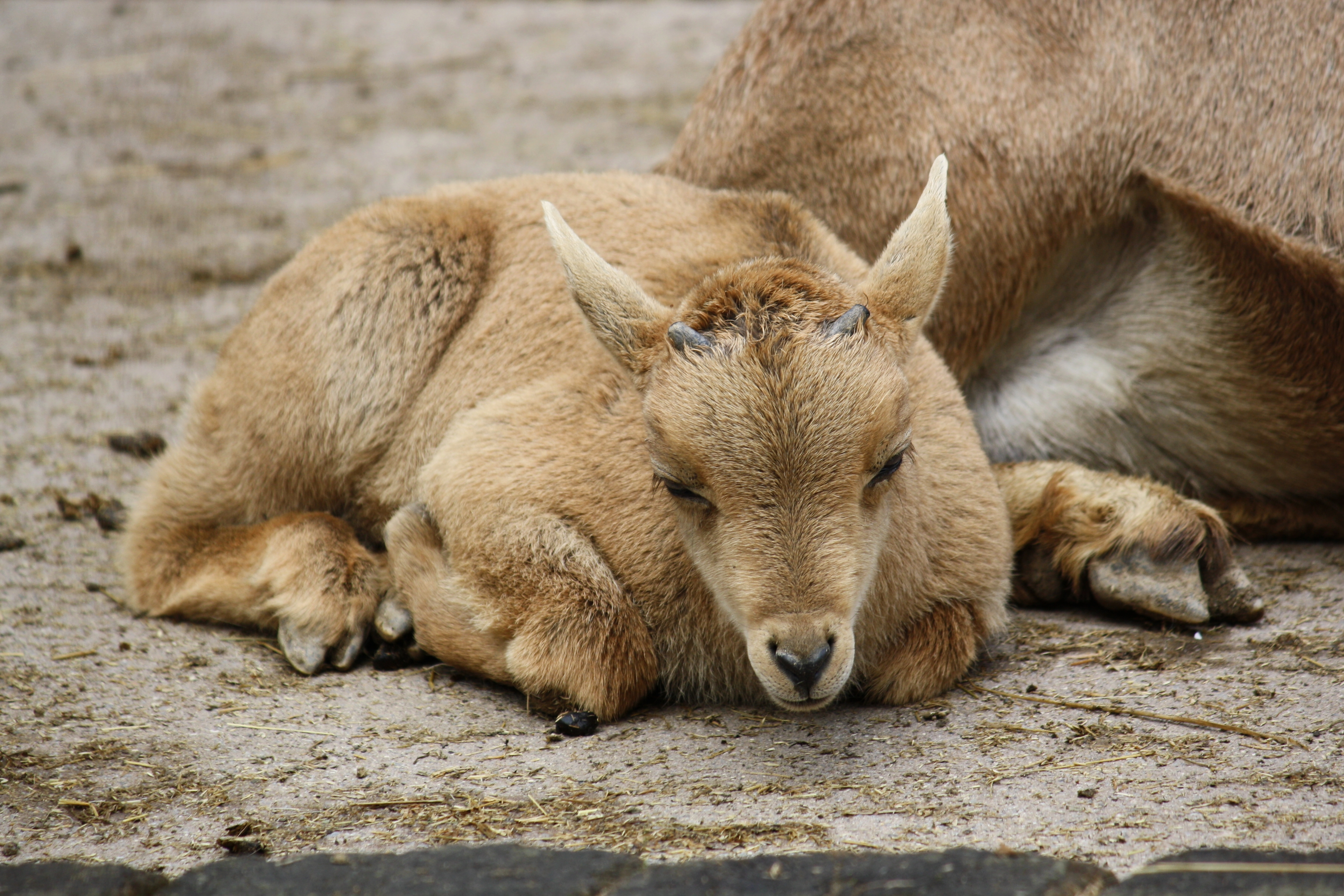
Juvenile in the Prague Zoo

A. lervia is the only species in the genus Ammotragus, but some authors include this genus in the goat genus Capra, together with the sheep genus Ovis.

The subspecies are found allopatrically in various parts of North Africa:

- A. l. lervia Pallas, 1777 (vulnerable)
- A. l. ornata I. Geoffroy Saint-Hilaire, 1827 (Egyptian Barbary sheep, thought to be extinct in the wild, but still found in the eastern desert of Egypt)
- A. l. sahariensis Rothschild, 1913 (vulnerable)
- A. l. blainei Rothschild, 1913 (vulnerable)
- A. l. angusi Rothschild, 1921 (vulnerable)
- A. l. fassini Lepri, 1930 (vulnerable)

== Habitats ==
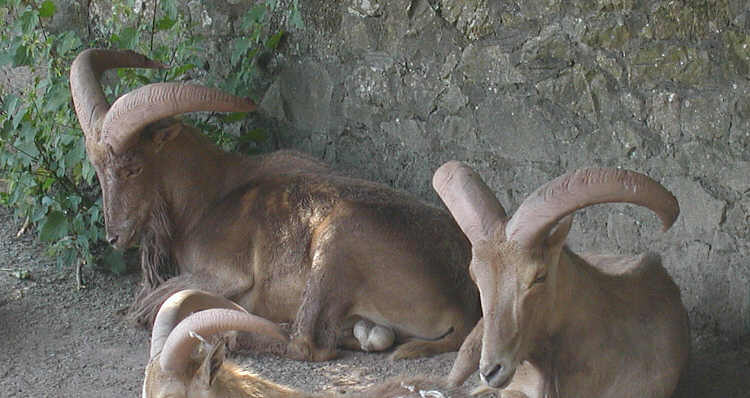
Barbary sheep at Paignton Zoo of Devon, England

Barbary sheep are found in arid mountainous areas where they graze and browse grasses, bushes, and lichens. They are able to obtain all their metabolic water from food, but if liquid water is available, they drink and wallow in it. Barbary sheep are crepuscular - active in the early morning and late afternoon and rest in the heat of the day. They are very agile and can achieve a standing jump over 2 m (7 ft). They are well adapted to their habitat, which consist of steep, rocky mountains and canyons. They often flee at the first sign of danger, typically running uphill. They are extremely nomadic and travel constantly via mountain ranges. Their main predators in North Africa were the Barbary leopard, Barbary lion, and caracal, but now humans, feral dogs, competition due to overgrazing by domestic animals, and drought threaten their populations.

== Names ==
The binomial name Ammotragus lervia derives from the Greek ἄμμος ámmos ("sand", referring to the sand-coloured coat) and τράγος trágos ("goat").

Lervia derives from the wild sheep of northern Africa described as "lerwee" by Rev. T. Shaw in his Travels and Observations about parts of Barbary and Levant.

The Spanish named this sheep the arruis, from Berber arrwis, and the Spanish Legion even used it as a mascot for a time.

Aoudad ([ˈɑː.uːdæd]) is the name for this sheep used by the Berbers, a North African people, and it is also called arui and waddan (in Libya).

== Gallery ==
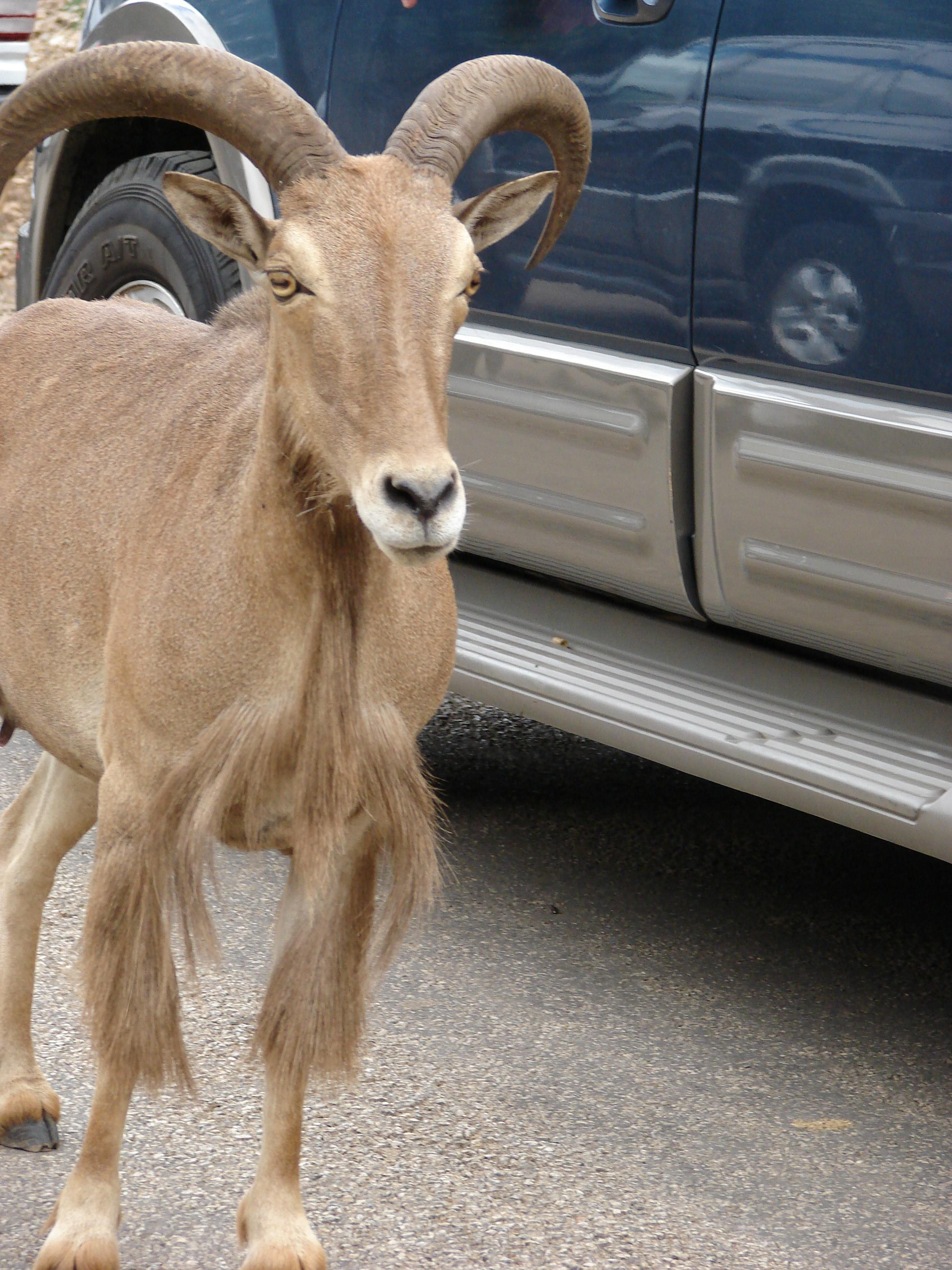
Barbary sheep seeks handouts at a Texas wildlife park

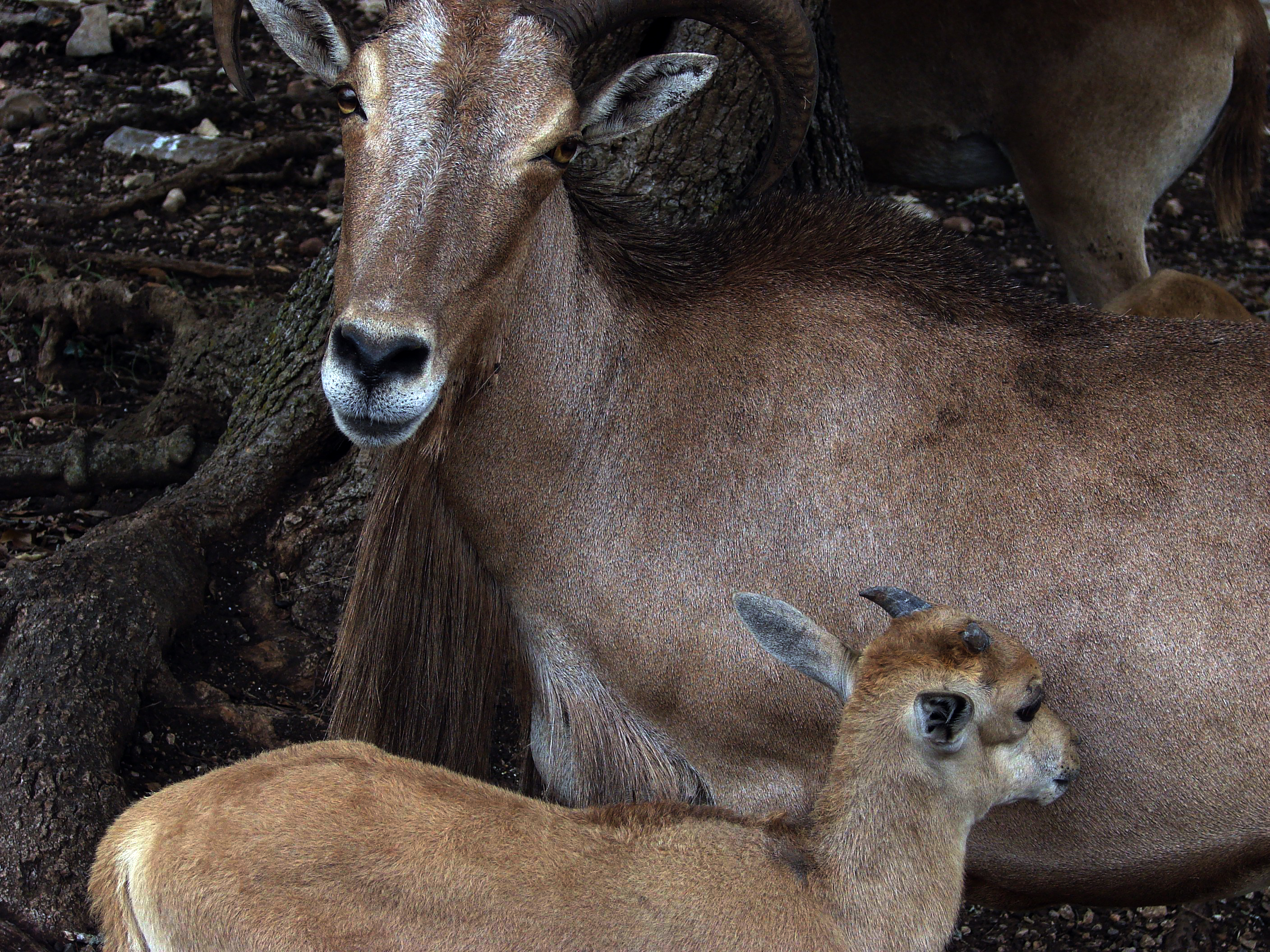
Ewe and lamb rest in the shade of a tree

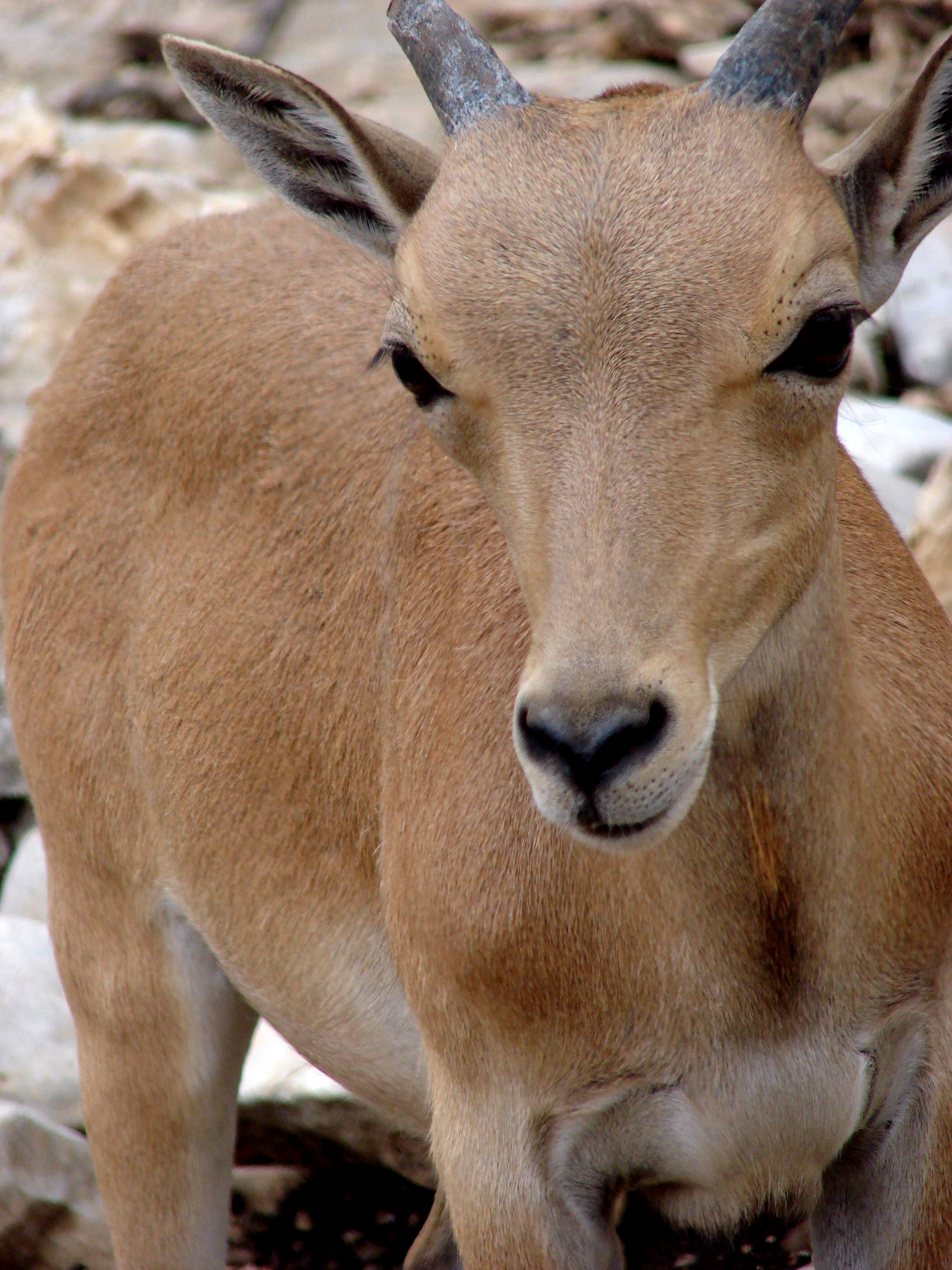
Lamb (closeup)

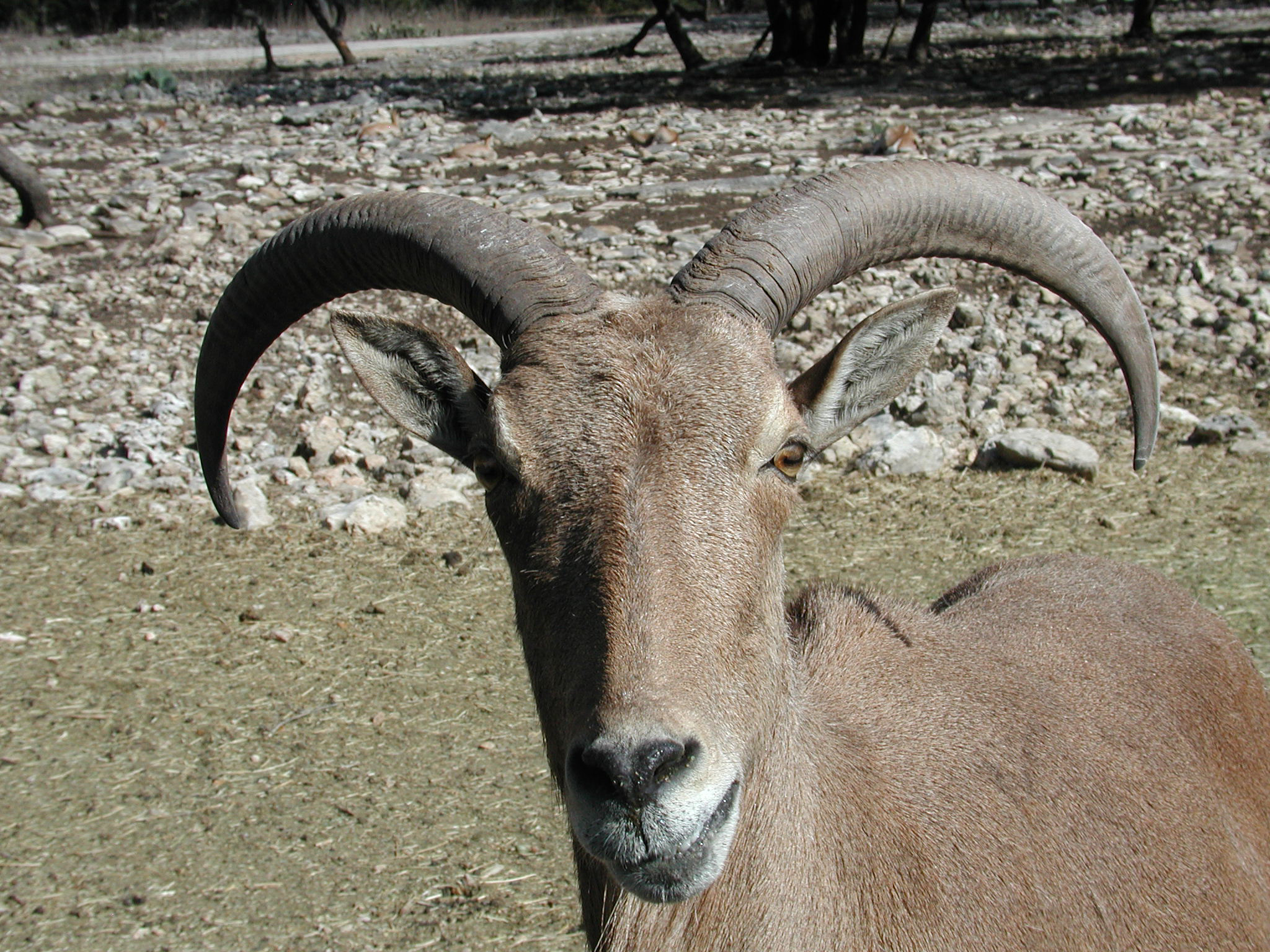
Barbary sheep at the Wildlife Ranch in San Antonio

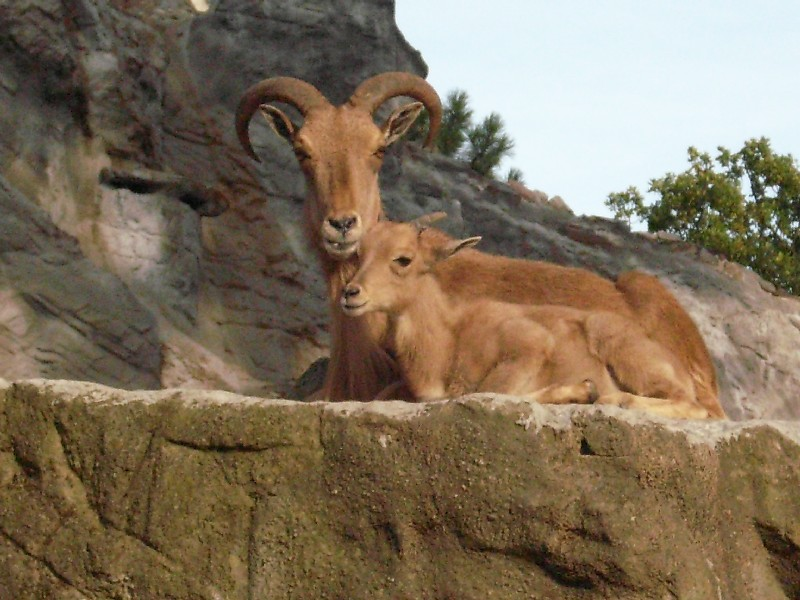
Barbary sheep at Tierpark Hagenbeck, Hamburg, Germany

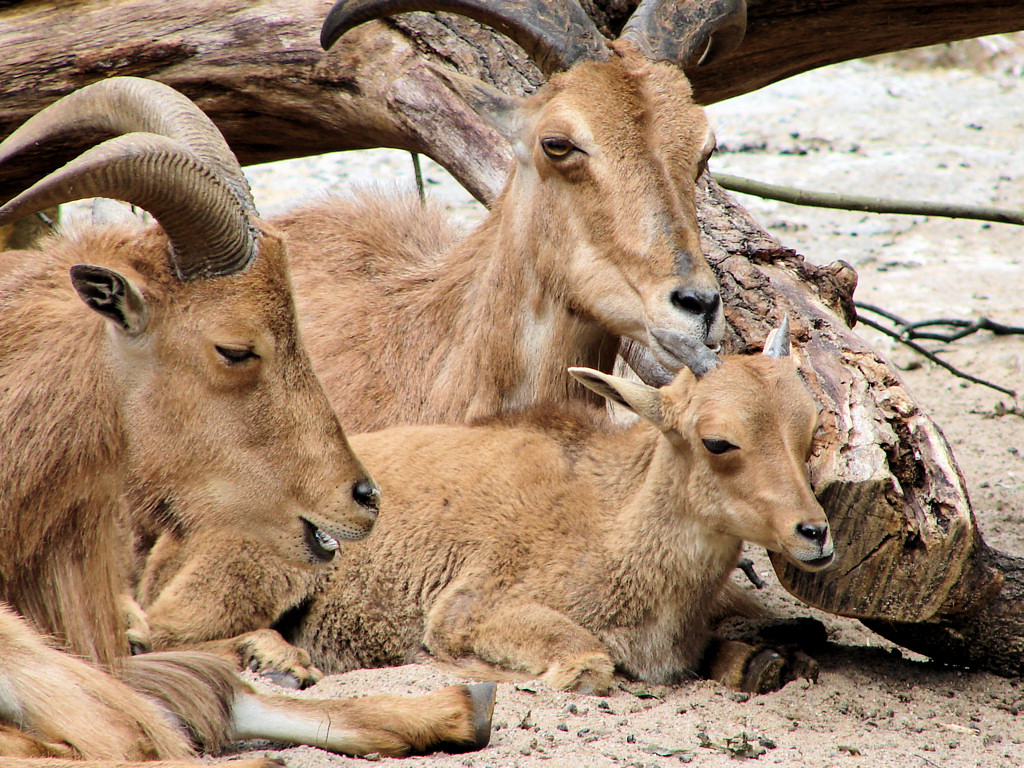
Ewes and a juvenile at Zoologischer Garten, Berlin, Germany

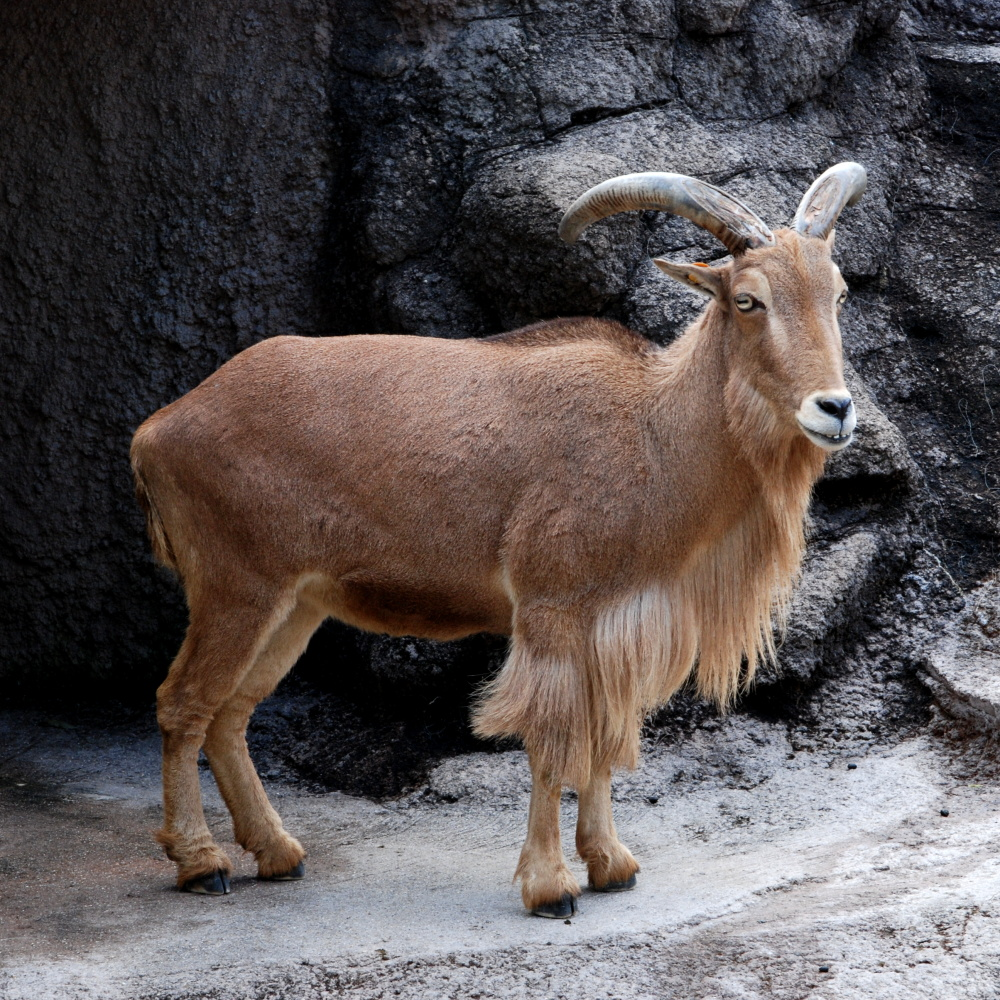
Barbary sheep at Tennōji Zoo, Japan

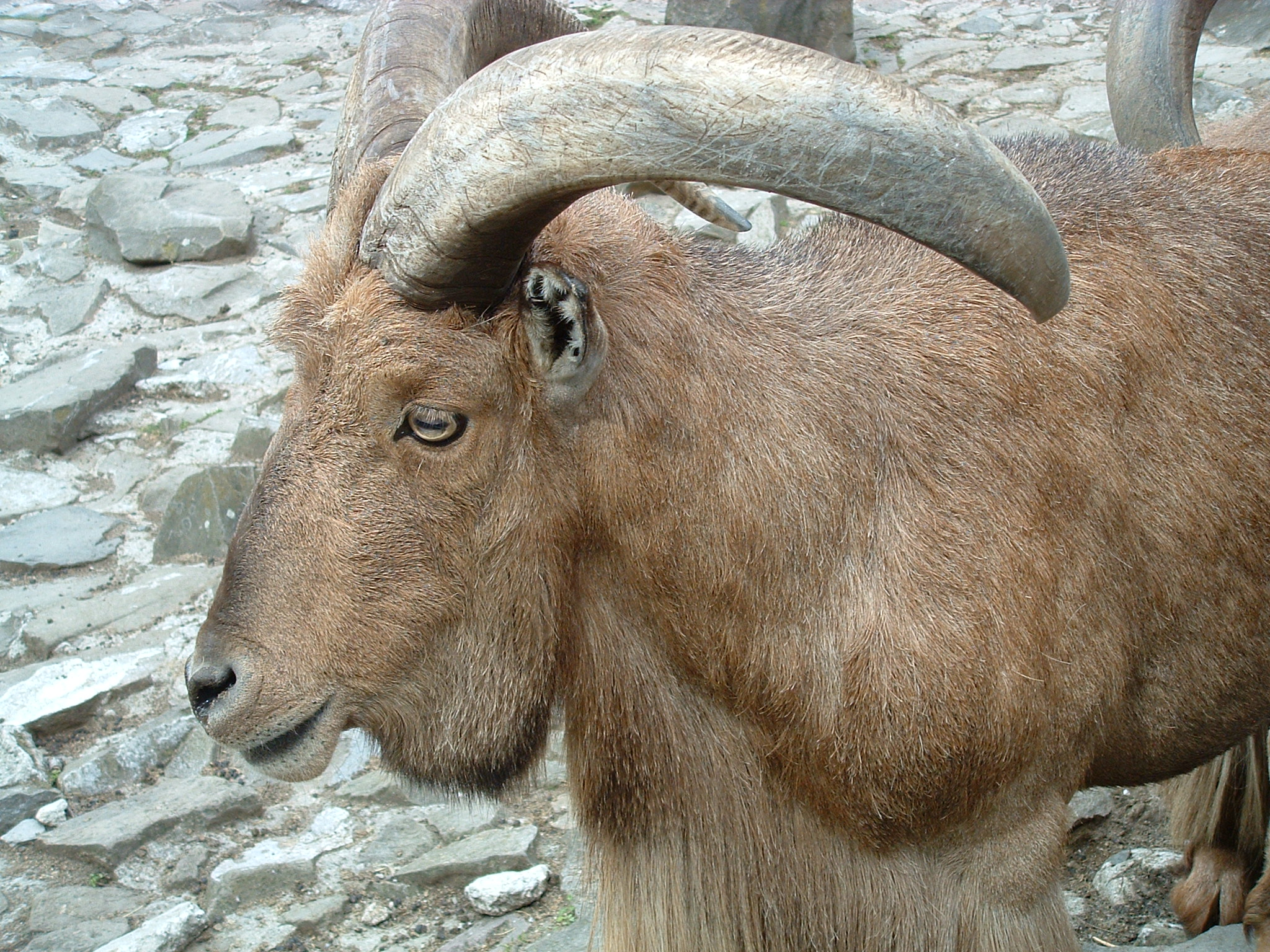
Head of a ram

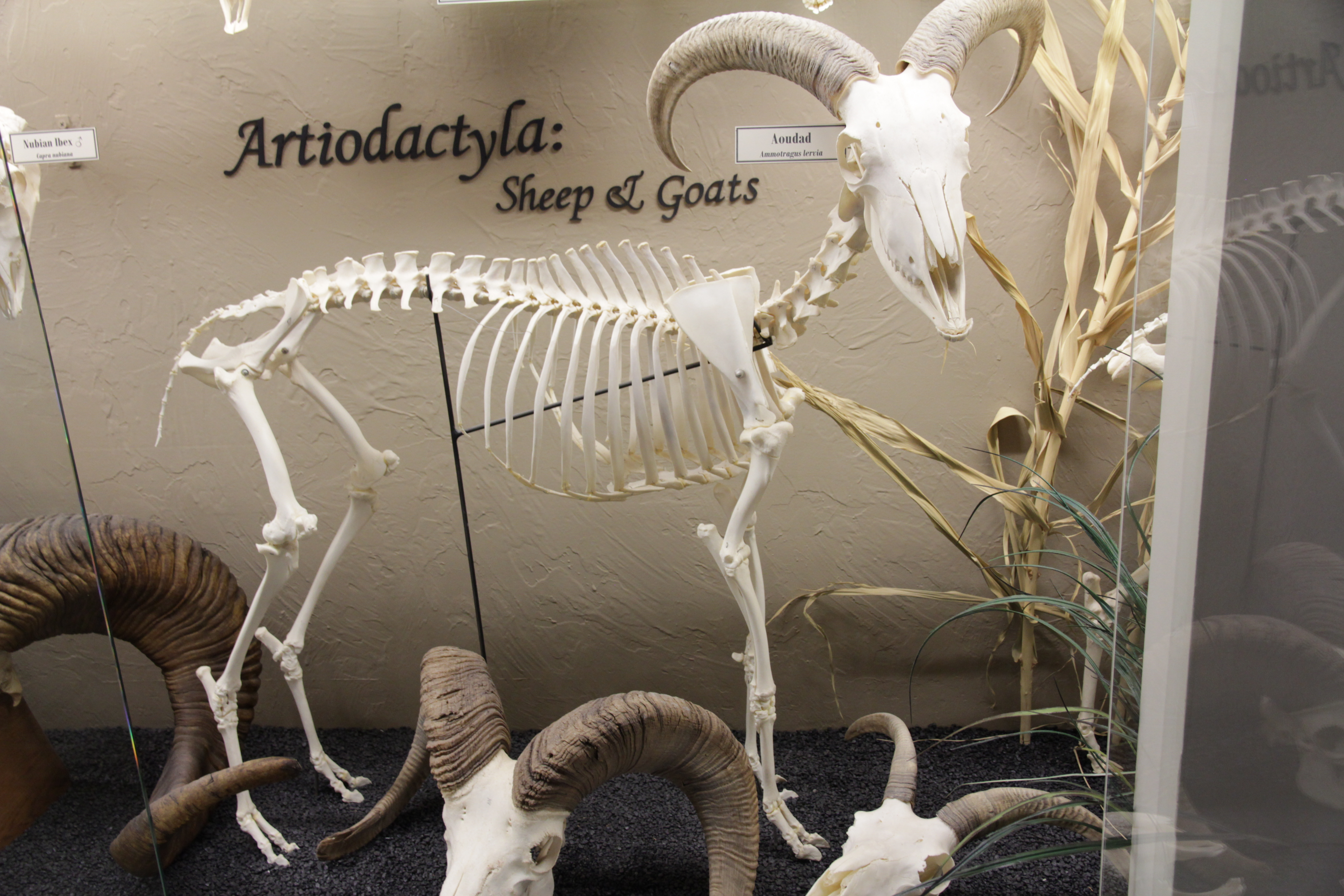
Skeleton of a Barbary sheep (Museum of Osteology)

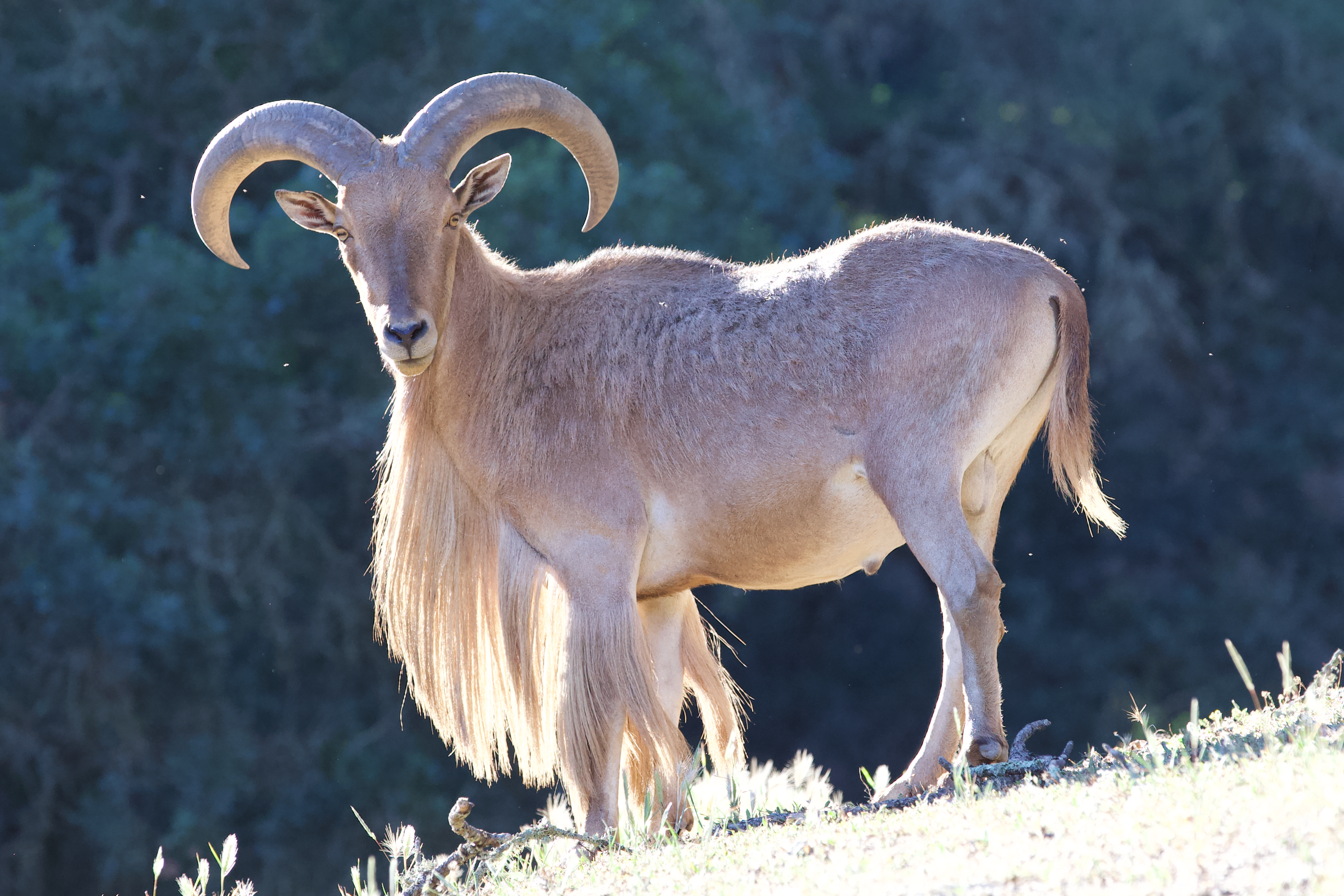
Captive Barbary sheep Safari West Santa Rosa, California

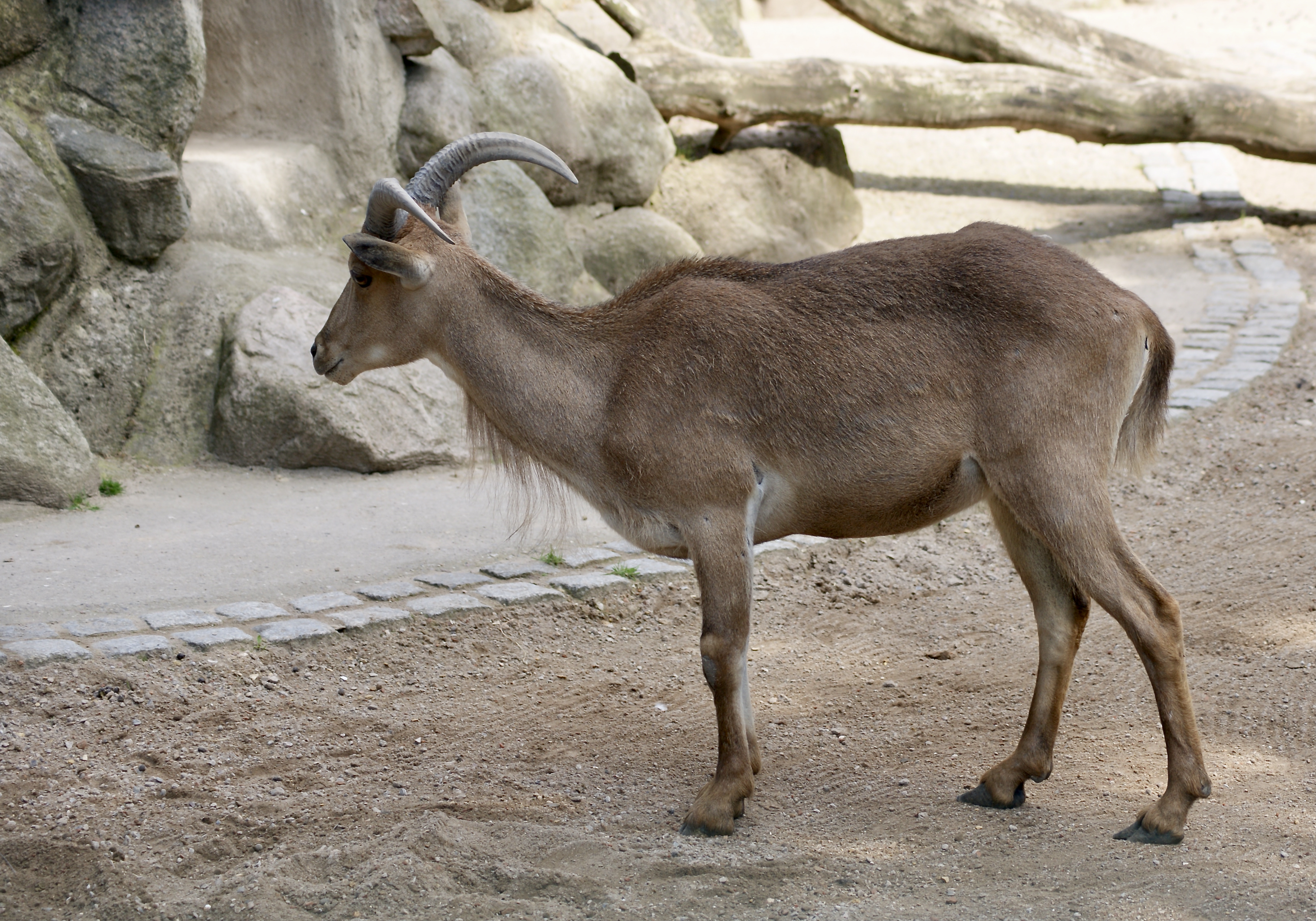

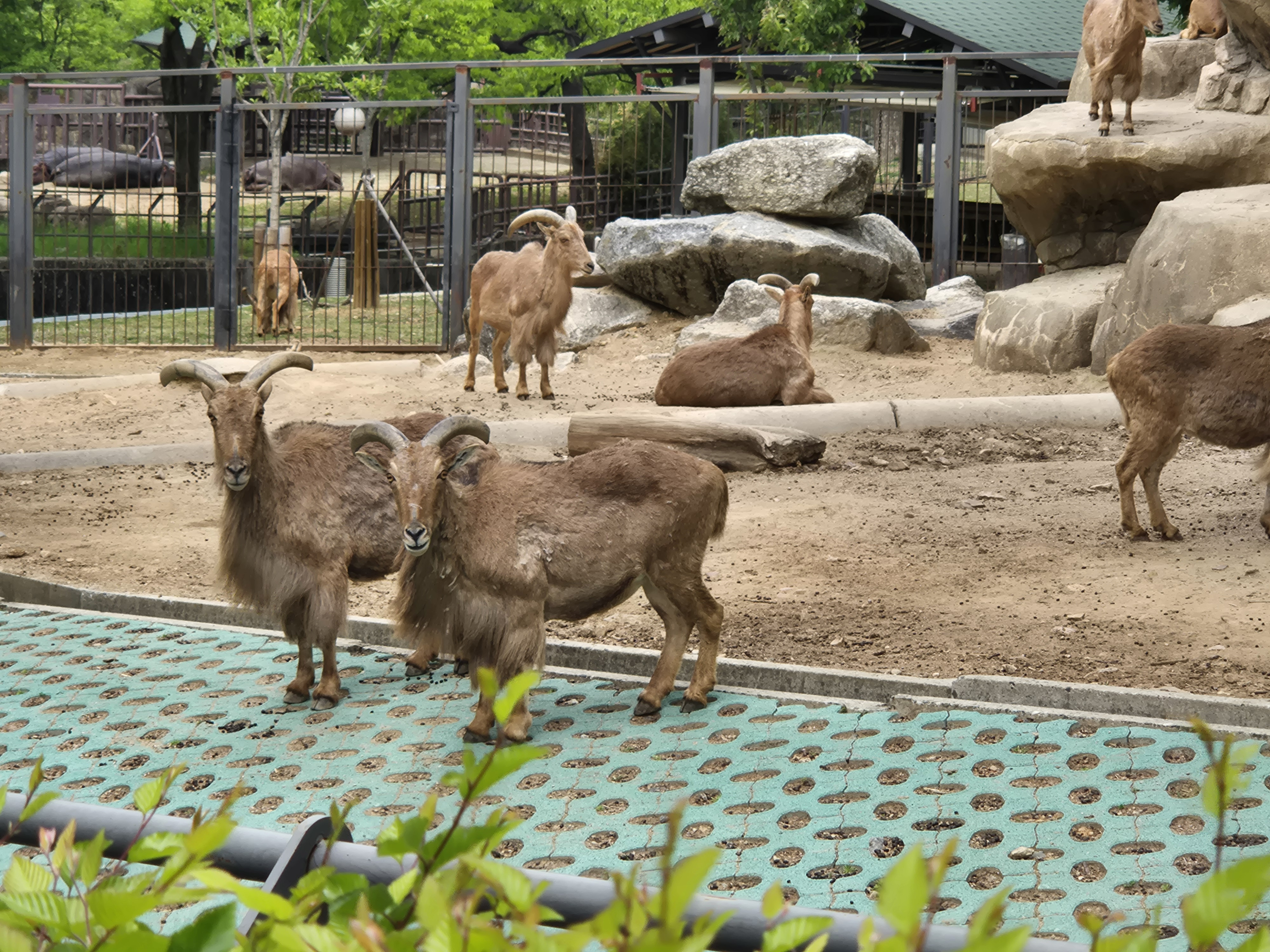

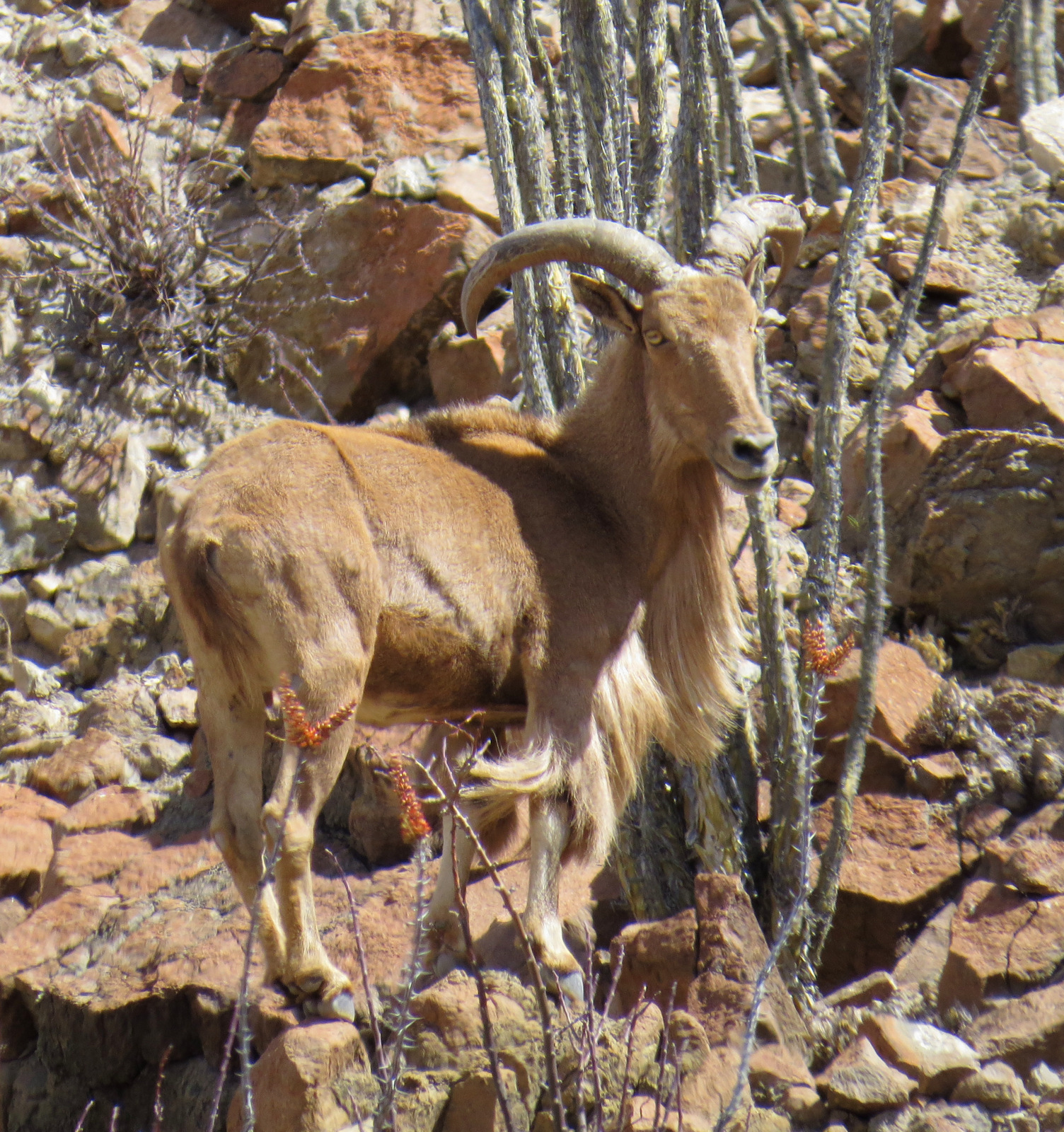

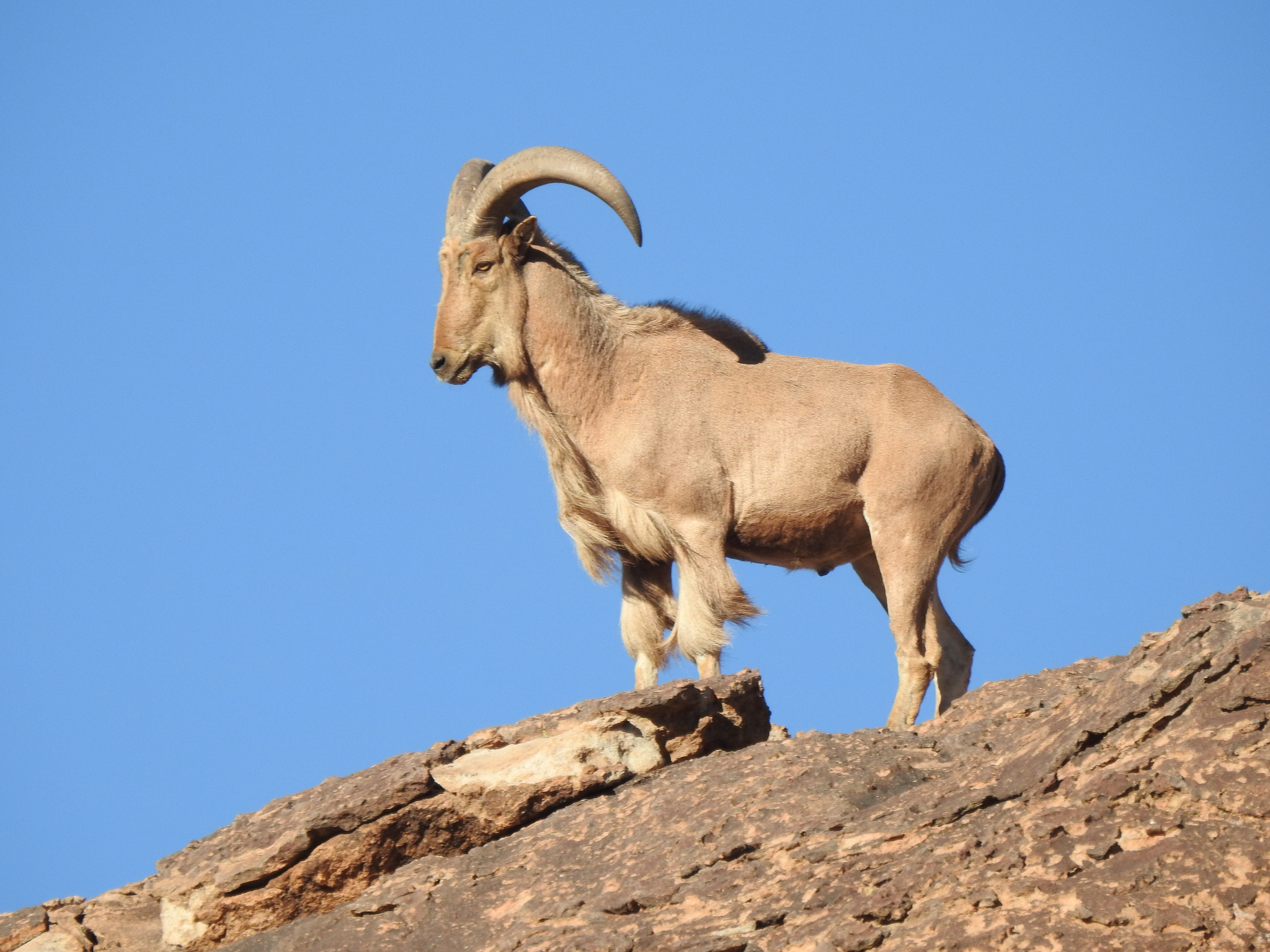

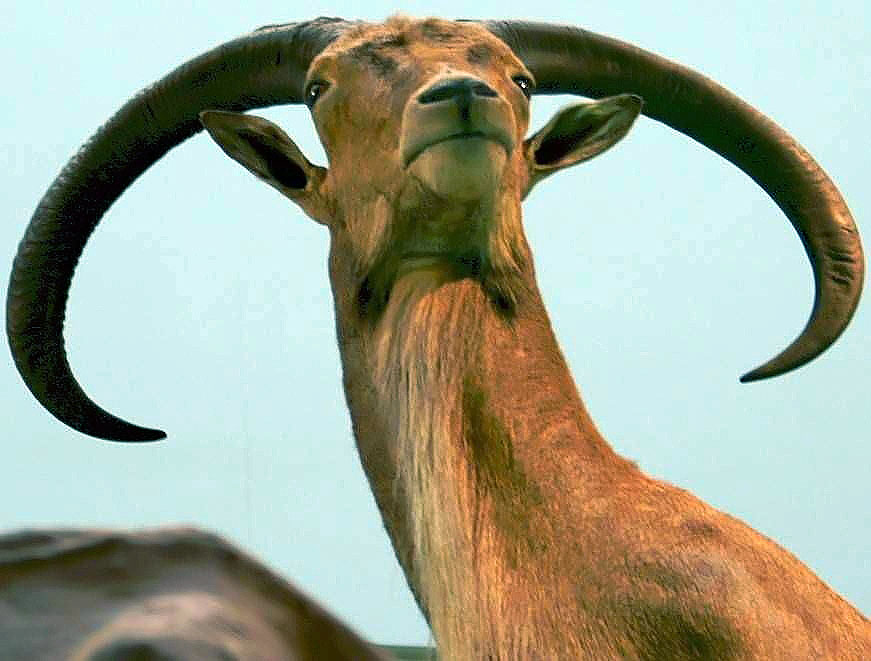

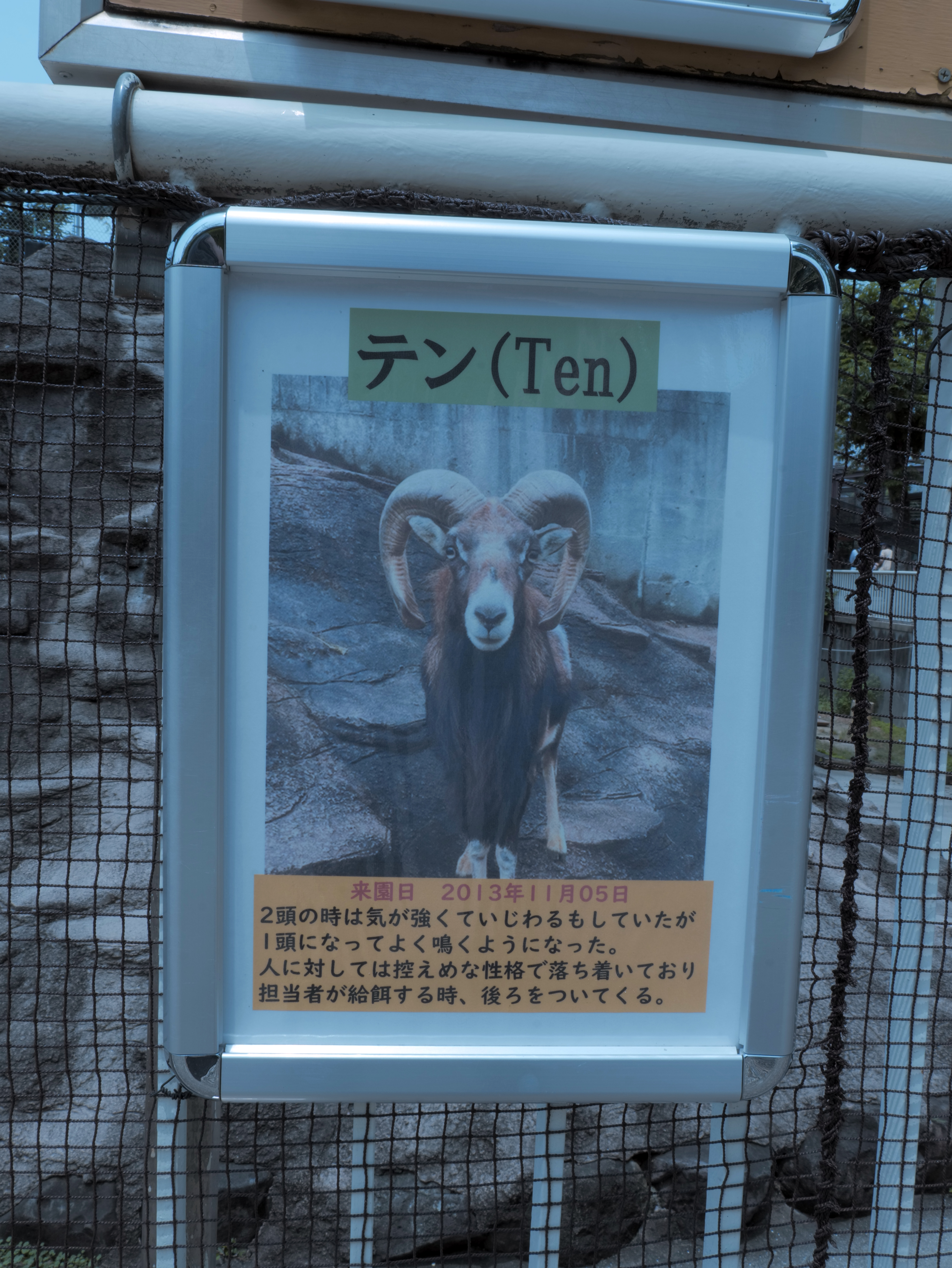

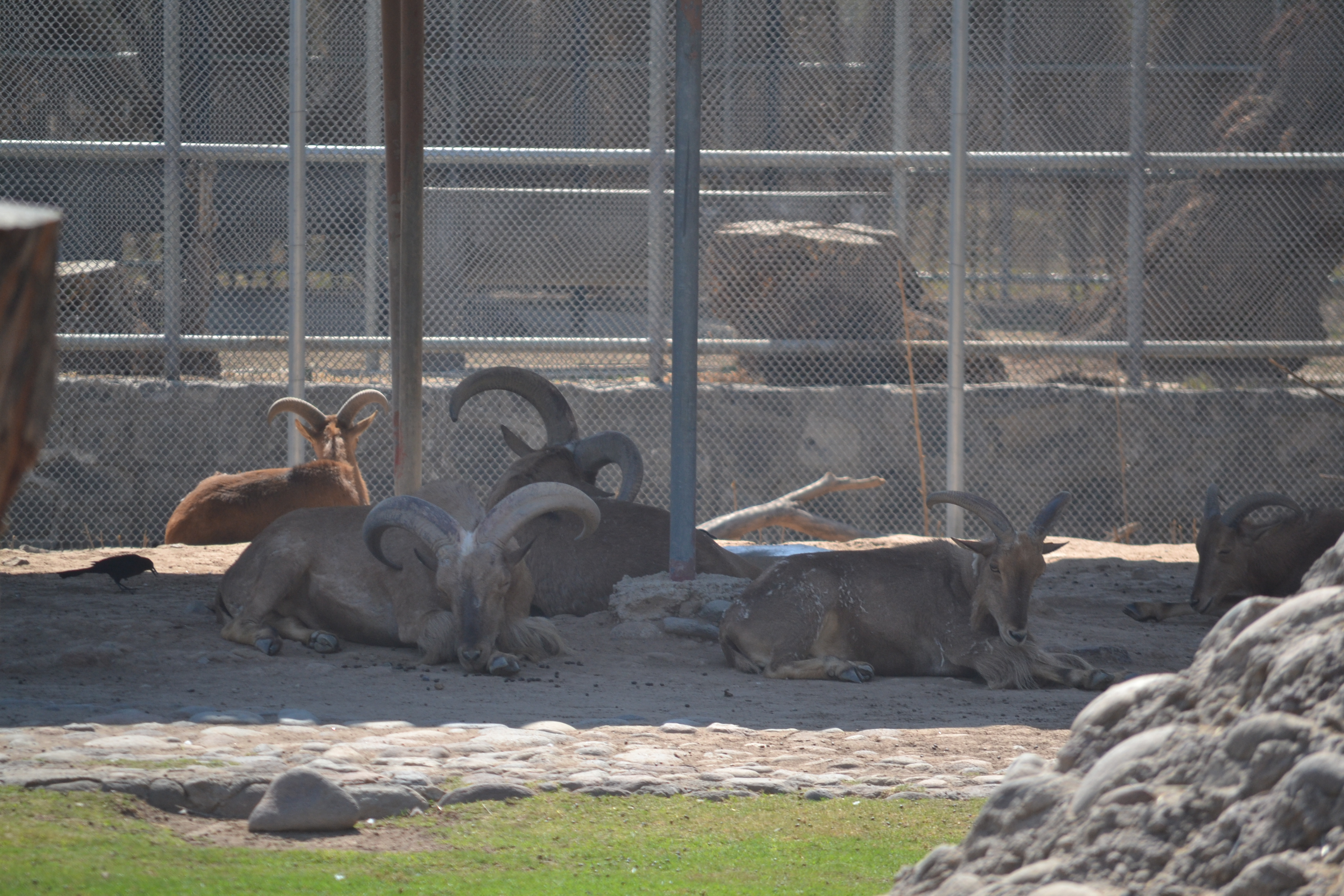

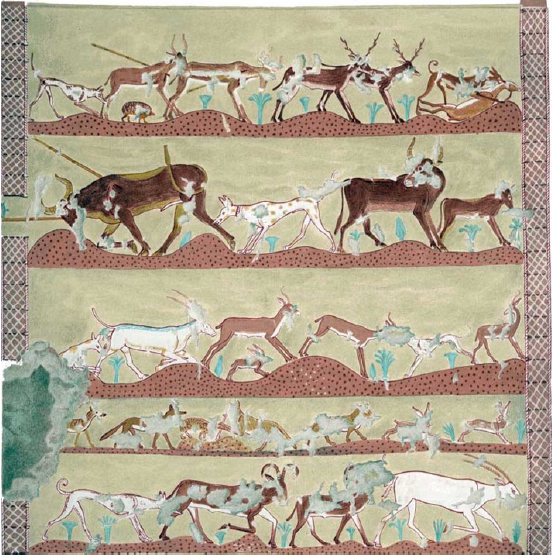
