= Altai Mountain goat =

Breed of goat

- Other names: Gorno Altai; Gornoaltaiskaya; Горноалтайская
- Country of origin: USSR
- Use: wool

Traits
- Weight: Male: 65 to 70 kg; Female: 41 to 44 kg
- Coat: black, dark brown, grey
- Goat; Capra aegagrus hircus

The Altai Mountain goat is a breed of domestic goat bred for wool production in the Altai Republic of the Russian Federation. The breed was developed during the years from 1944 to 1982 in the Gorno-Altai Autonomous Soviet Socialist Republic region of the Soviet Union, by cross-breeding the Don goat with local goats for a high wool yield.

== Appearance ==
Females (nanny goats) weigh 41 to 44kg (90 to 97lb) while males (billy goats) weigh 65 to 70kg (143 to 155lb). Altai Mountain goats are black in color at a young age, and change to dark brown or grey as they mature. A distinctive feature of the Altai Mountain goat is the length and volume of the wool they grow, which is three to four times more than the local goats of the region.

== Origin ==
The breed was first introduced in the Altai Republic region of the Altai Mountains. The breed was slowly developed between 1944 and 1982 by cross-breeding the Don goat with goats local to the region. The goal of developing the breed was to create a goat with a high wool production that could withstand the severe weather conditions of the harsh winters in Siberia.

== Reproduction and care ==
The Altai Mountain goat was originally bred to increase the amount of wool available per goat. During the project's peak, the population grew almost 30 percent in a year. They are currently bred to increase the population.

Due to their selective breeding for climate tolerance, Altai Mountain goats can be kept on pasture year-round.

== South African project ==
In 1997, approximately 500 Altai Mountain goats were released in South Africa by Sentrachem, a South African agricultural chemical company. As a result, owning goat flocks became more profitable by producing a breed that had a high yield of both meat and cashmere. This helped spur agricultural production in South Africa and bolster the fiber and Cashmere wool industry. When cross-bred with the indigenous goats, the goats are expected to have a higher meat and cashmere yield (around 600g of brown cashmere), increasing profitability of goat herds.
