= Otto Lang (film producer) =

Bosnian American skier and film producer

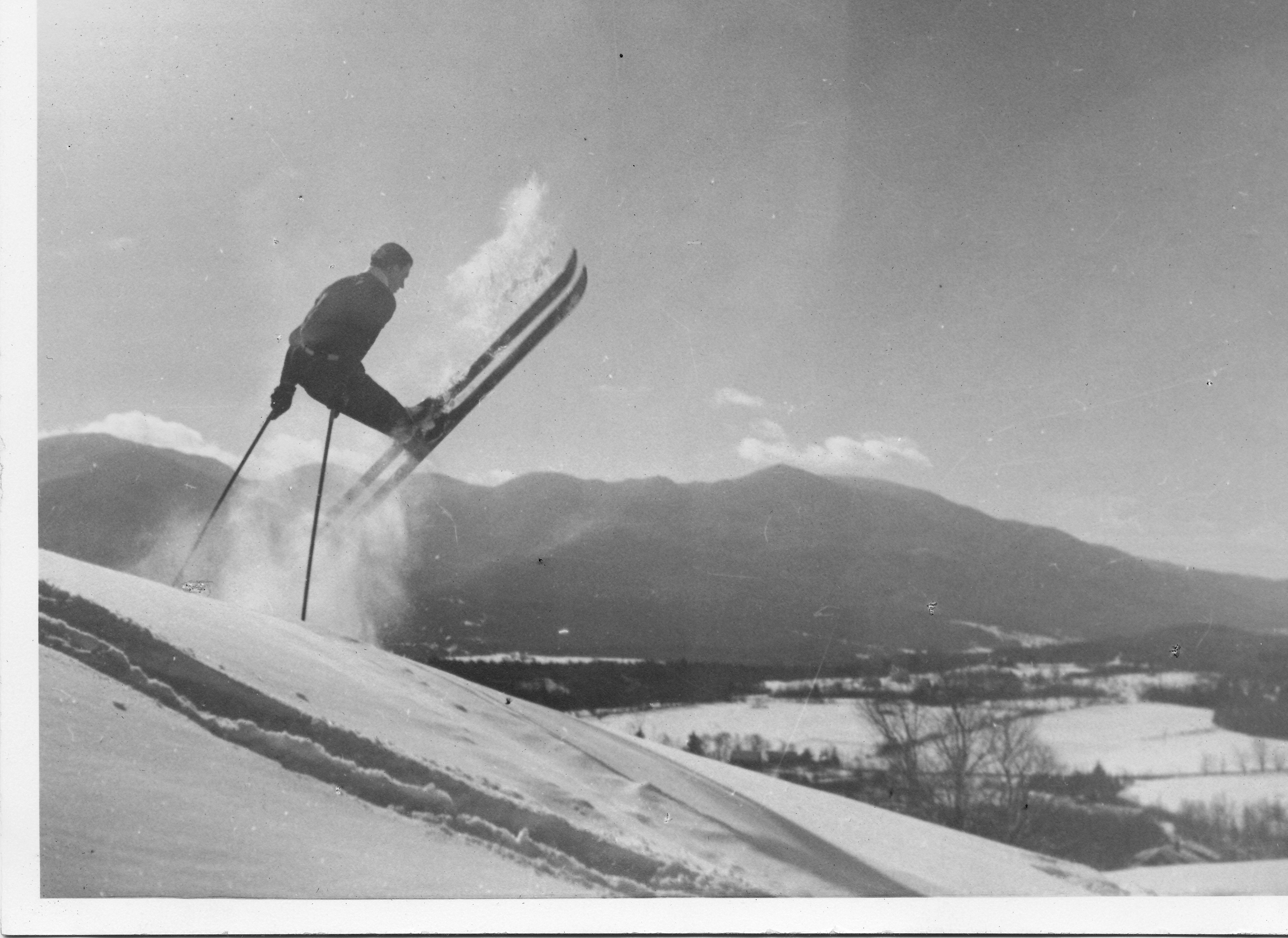
- NH Peckett's Inn 1936
- Born: 21 January 1908; Zenica, Bosnia and Herzegovina, at the time administered by Austria-Hungary (modern-day Bosnia and Herzegovina)
- Died: 30 January 2006 (aged 98); Seattle, Washington, US
- Occupations: ski school instructor/director, film producer
- Years active: 1928–1984 (ski)

Otto Lang (21 January 1908 – 30 January 2006) was a skier and pioneer ski instructor from Bosnia and Herzegovina, who lived and worked in the United States. After teaching skiing at a variety of smaller resorts in Austria, he joined the Hannes Schneider Ski School in St. Anton am Arlberg, one of the most prestigious ski schools of the era. Like many instructors who taught Schneider's Arlberg Method, Lang was eventually offered a chance to teach in the U.S., at Pecketts' on Sugar Hill in the White Mountains of New Hampshire. He later moved out west and founded ski schools on Mount Rainier, Mount Baker and Mount Hood.

After a visit to Sun Valley Resort at the request of his former student Nelson Rockefeller, Lang was offered a position at their ski school. Eventually he became the director of the ski school at Sun Valley and became a ski instructor for Hollywood stars. Later he became a movie director and producer, primarily due to his contacts at Sun Valley, including an ongoing friendship with studio executive Darryl F. Zanuck. He demonstrated ski techniques in Jerome Hill's documentary Ski Flight (1938) which premiered at Radio City Music Hall. His 1936 book Downhill Skiing is a manual for skiing instruction for the fledgling sport. Ski filmmaker Warren Miller and newsman Lowell Thomas both credited Lang's book as an inspiration for their interest in skiing.

Lang was hired by Darryl F. Zanuck to assist with the ski sequences of the 1941 movie Sun Valley Serenade starring Sonja Henie, which ultimately led to his cinematic work. Some of his notable feature films include Call Northside 777 (1948 – producer), 5 Fingers (1952 – producer), Love is a Many-Splendored Thing (1955 – director for scenes filmed in Hong Kong), Search for Paradise (working title The Search for Shangri-La) (1956 – director) and Tora! Tora! Tora! (1970 – associate producer of the Japanese segments). He produced the short films Vesuvius Express (1953), The First Piano Quartette (1954) and Jet Carrier (1954) nominated for Academy Awards.

Otto Lang is also an author. His memoir, A Bird of Passage – The Story of My Life – From the Alps of Austria to Hollywood, U.S.A., was published in 1994, and the same year he was presented Ski Film Maker Legend of the Year award at the Crested Butte International Ski Film Festival. Around the World in 90 Years – Images From My Life’s Journey, published in 2000, is a collection of photographs taken by Lang during his lifelong travels. The pages include his anecdotal descriptions of the photographs and his life. In 1978 he was inducted into the US National Ski Hall of Fame, and in 2004 he was presented a Lifetime Achievement Award from the North American Snowsports Journalists Association.

Otto Lang's son Peter, inspired by his father's work with animals on the television shows Sea Hunt, Flipper, and Daktari, is the founder and owner of the Safari West Wildlife Preserve in Sonoma County, California.

== Bibliography ==
- Lang, Otto (1936) Downhill Skiing New York: H. Holt and company OCLC 2105449
- Lang, Otto (1940) Ski Tips Portland, OR: Hirsch-Weiss, White Stag
- Lang, Otto (1941) How To Ski: A Book For Both the Beginner and the Experienced Skier New York: The Sun Dial Press OCLC 1862697
- Lang, Otto (1994) A Bird of Passage: the story of my life Helena, Mont.: SkyHouse Publishers ISBN 9781560442943
- Lang, Otto (2000) Around the World in 90 Years – Images From My Life’s Journey Seattle, Wash.: Elton-Wolf Pub. ISBN 9781586190170
