= Safari West =

- Interactive map of Safari West
- 38.5571°N 122.6959°W
- Location: Sonoma County, California, United States
- Land area: 400 acres (160 ha)
- No. of animals: over 1000
- No. of species: 98
- Website: safariwest.org

Safari West is a 400-acre (160 ha) wildlife preserve located 12 miles north of the city of Santa Rosa in Sonoma County, California, United States. Founded in 1993 by Peter Lang and Nancy Lang, the preserve is home to hundreds of animals representing numerous species, with a focus on African wildlife.

Safari West offers guided safari tours and overnight accommodations, and emphasizes research, education and conservation. In 2026, the organization began transitioning toward nonprofit stewardship through the Safari West Zoological Society, a California nonprofit public benefit corporation.

== History ==
The establishment was started in the 1970s by Peter Lang on the Franklin Canyon cattle ranch in Beverly Hills, California once owned and operated by oil tycoon Edward L. Doheny. Peter Lang and his second wife, Diane Doheny purchased "The Last Cattle Ranch in Beverly Hills" from the Doheny family in 1977. Peter's father Otto Lang was the famed ski instructor, film producer and director who worked on the films Sun Valley Serenade, Call Northside 777, 5 Fingers, Love is a Many-Splendored Thing, Search for Paradise, Tora! Tora! Tora!, and the television shows The Man from U.N.C.L.E., Sea Hunt, Flipper, and Daktari. Peter, inspired by his father's work with animals, including Clarence the Cross-Eyed Lion and Judy the Chimp on Daktari, began to keep wild animals on the ranch.

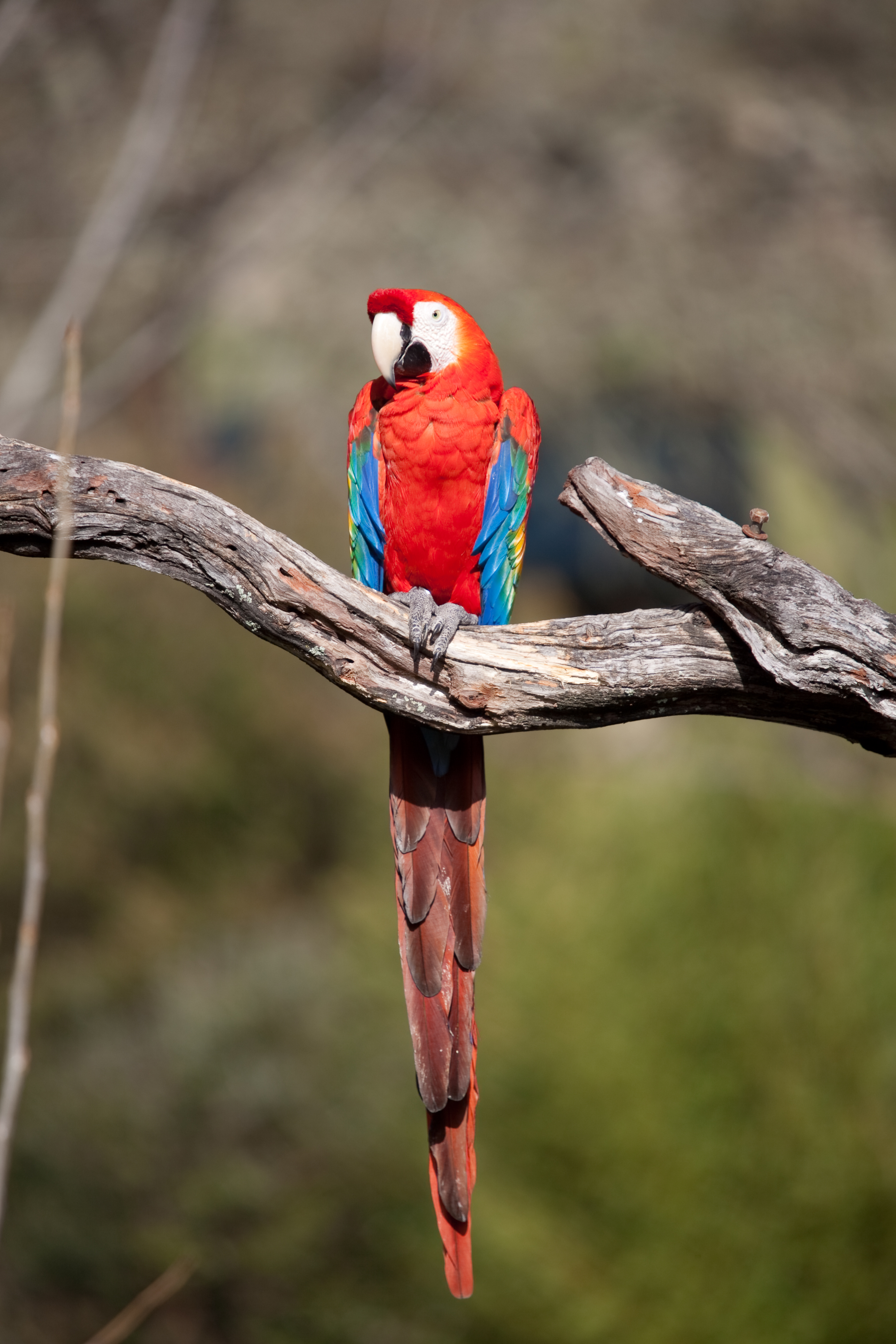
Various types of birds can be found in the park.

After selling the Franklin Canyon Ranch to the Santa Monica Mountains Parks, Recreation & Conservation Authority in 1981, Peter Lang moved his family and wildlife operation to the historic Converse Ranch in Santa Paula, California. It was a scenic 1,200 acre cattle, avocado, citrus, and oil ranch on the bank of the Santa Clara River, abandoned by its previous owner, the Converse family of Horton & Converse Pharmacy.

In the late 1980s, Lang moved his wildlife operation to its present location on a former cattle ranch near Santa Rosa, California. In 1993, Safari West was opened to children's tours, and later added overnight lodging, safari tours, and a restaurant.

As of 2017, Safari West has hosted more than 1,000,000 visitors and is home to over 800 animals of approximately 80 animal species. On the night of October 8, 2017, using only garden hoses, Peter Lang, at age 76, single-handedly fought back the flames of the Tubbs Fire for 10 hours. No animals were killed in the fire.

== Animals ==
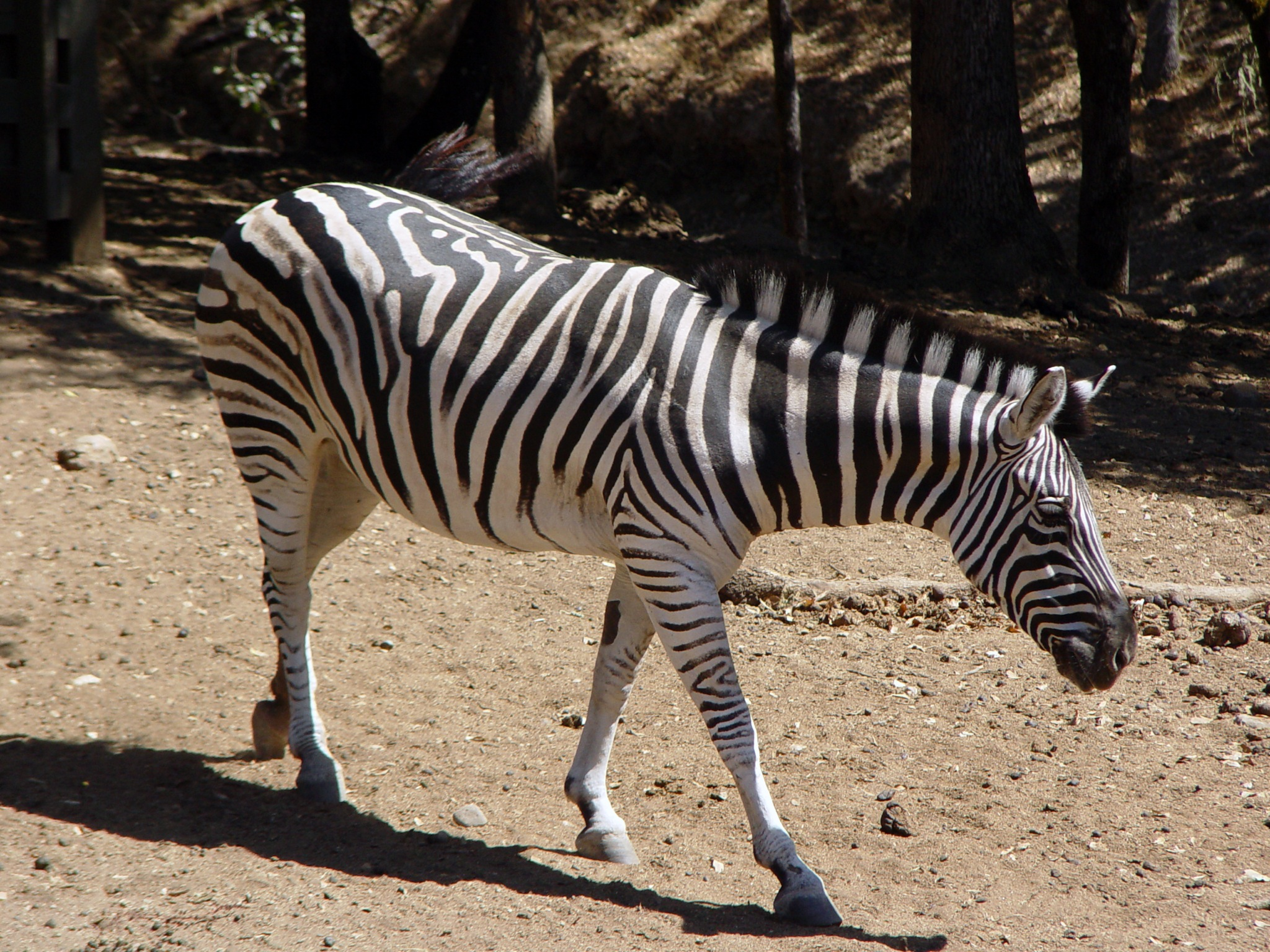
A zebra at the park.

The selection of wildlife emphasizes species native to Africa, including giraffes, rhinoceros, cape buffalo, watusi cattle, antelope, cheetahs, zebras, hyenas, primates and numerous species of birds.

The park engages in research, education, conservation, and breeding programs that, through exchanges with other zoos and parks, keep the gene pool healthy for the species that are involved in the program.

The park is also home to species that are extinct in the wild. The park combines wild animal care with vacation lodging. It was one of only six accredited private zoological facilities in the United States, but lost its accreditation on October 6, 2021.

== See also ==
- Fossil Rim Wildlife Center
