= Don goat =

Breed of goat

The Don goat is a breed of goat from the Don River of the Lower Volga region in Russia. It produces cashmere, mohair, wool, goatskin, and milk. It has the highest average wool per individual goat sheared of any goat breed and produces milk with a relatively high fat content. Physically, Don goats are typically black, although some are white; males are generally between 65–85 kg, while females range 35–40 kg.
