= Goat Mountain (Vancouver, British Columbia) =

Mountain in British Columbia, Canada

- Location within British Columbia
- Interactive map of Goat Mountain

Highest point
- Elevation: 1,401 m (4,596 ft)
- Prominence: 336 m (1,102 ft)
- Listing: Mountains of British Columbia
- Coordinates: 49°24′13″N 123°04′44″W

Geography
- Location: British Columbia, Canada
- District: New Westminster Land District
- Parent range: Pacific Cordillera / Coast Mountains / Pacific Ranges / Howe Sound Group
- Topo map: NTS 92G6 North Vancouver

Goat Mountain is a mountain peak rising east of the Crown Pass, located directly north of Grouse Mountain in North Vancouver, British Columbia, Canada. An approximate 8 km, 4 hour, round-trip hike from Grouse Mountain, Goat Mountain is popular with local hikers, as its steep summit tower provides excellent views over the Greater Vancouver area, Howe Sound, Washington state, the Strait of Georgia, Vancouver Island, and the Coast Mountains. It also offers area for bouldering east of its summit.

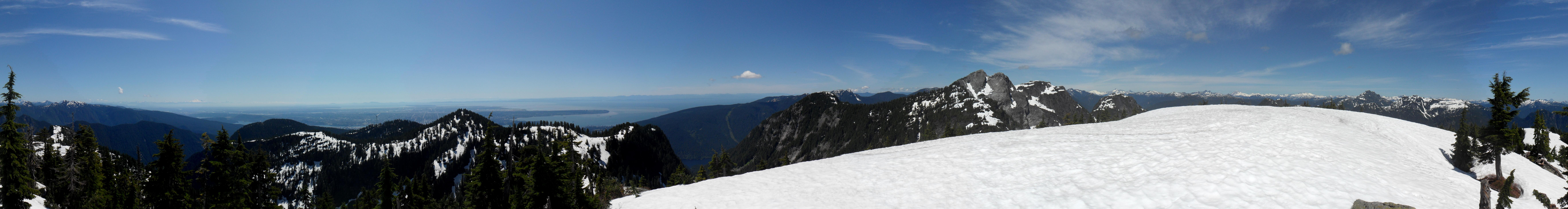
A 360 degree panoramic view from the top of Goat Mountain, overlooking Greater Vancouver, Howe Sound, Washington state, the Strait of Georgia, Vancouver Island, and the Coast Mountains.
