= Goat Mountain (Brewster County, Texas) =

Mountain in Texas, United States

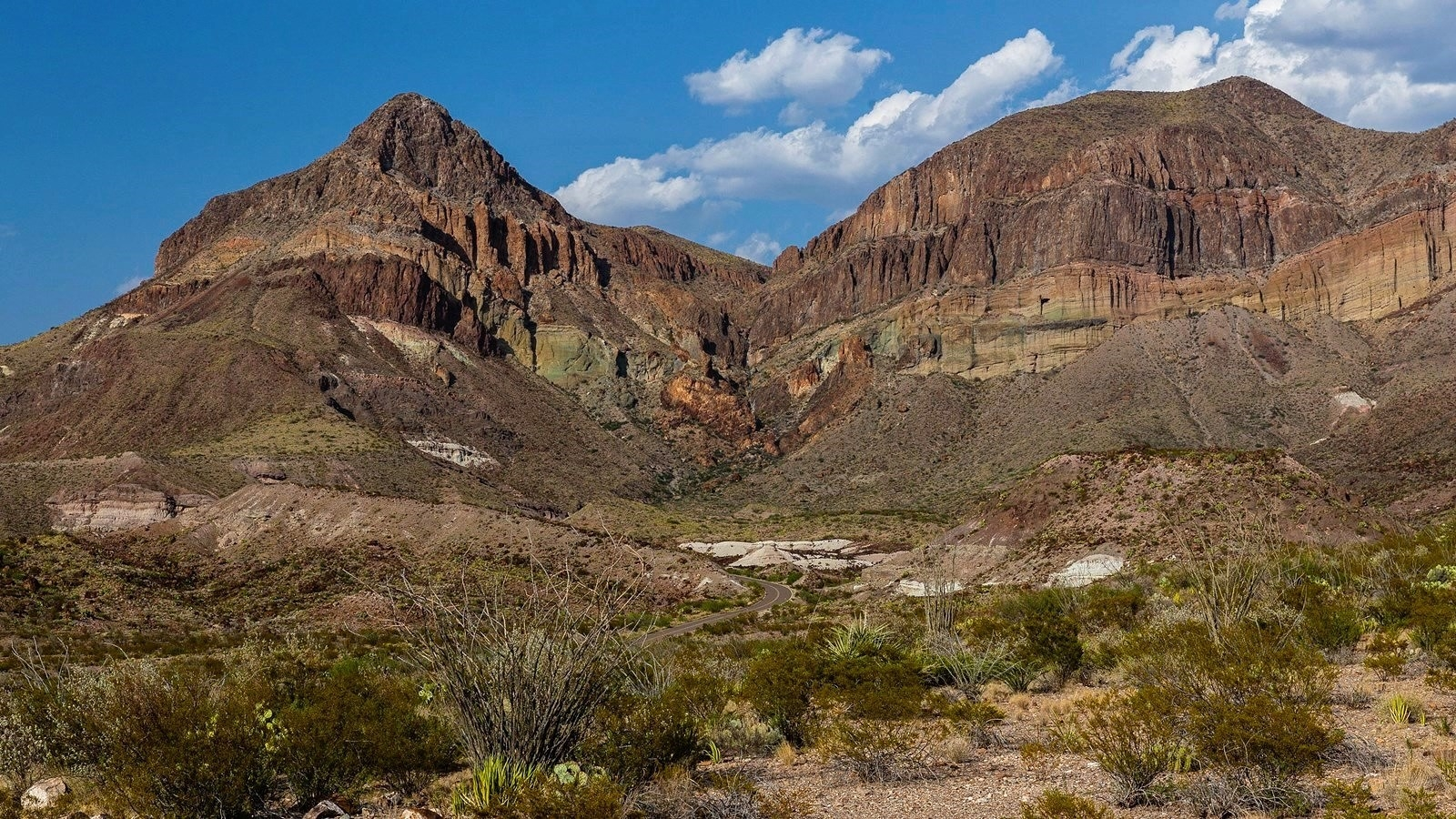
- Southwest aspect, summit to right

Highest point
- Elevation: 4,619 ft (1,408 m)
- Prominence: 723 ft (220 m)
- Isolation: 2.65 mi (4.26 km)
- Coordinates: 29°11′15″N 103°24′23″W

Geography
- Location within Texas Location within the United States
- Country: United States
- State: Texas
- County: Brewster
- Protected area: Big Bend National Park
- Parent range: Chisos Mountains
- Topo map: USGS Cerro Castellan

Geology
- Rock age: Oligocene
- Rock type: Igneous rock (Rhyolite)

Goat Mountain is a 4,619-foot-elevation (1,408-meter) summit in Brewster County, Texas, United States.

== Description ==
Goat Mountain is part of the Chisos Mountains where it is set in Big Bend National Park and the Chihuahuan Desert. The top of the mountain is composed of Burro Mesa Rhyolite (volcanic rock) which formed 29 million years ago during the Oligocene period. Lower slopes are composed of Wasp Spring Tuff of the Burro Mesa Formation, trachyte, and Bee Mountain Basalt of the Chisos Formation. Based on the Köppen climate classification, the mountain is located in a hot arid climate zone with hot summers and mild winters. This climate supports plants on the slopes such as oak, piñon pine, juniper, and grasses. Any scant precipitation runoff from the peak's slopes drains into Blue Creek and Smoky Creek which are both tributaries of the Rio Grande which is eight miles to the southwest. Topographic relief is significant as the summit rises 1,700 feet (518 m) above Ross Maxwell Scenic Drive in one mile (1.6 km). The mountain's toponym has been officially adopted by the United States Board on Geographic Names.

== See also ==
- List of mountain peaks of Texas
- Geography of Texas

== Gallery ==
West aspect, Peak 4540 (left) and summit to right

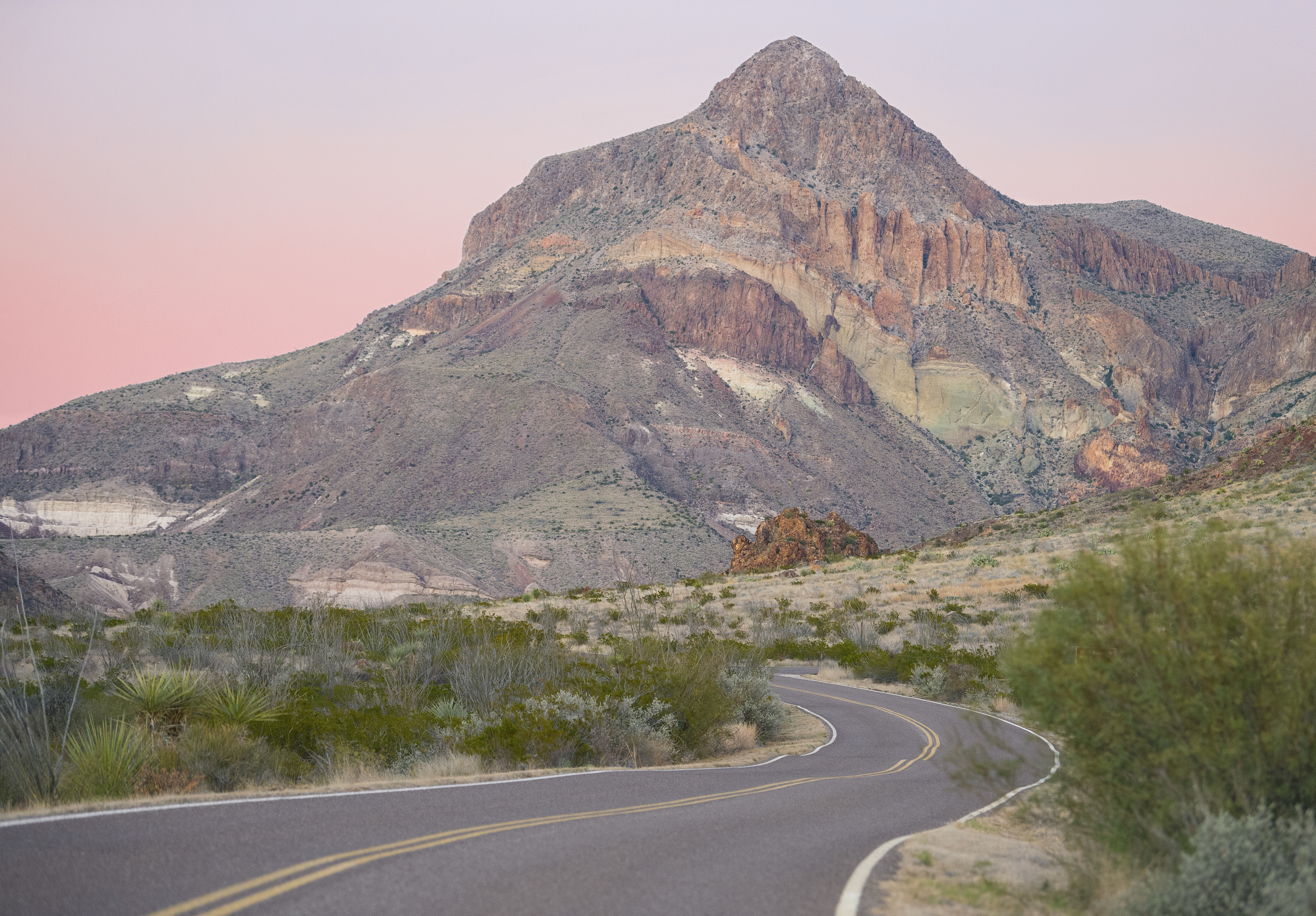
Peak 4540 and Ross Maxwell Scenic Drive

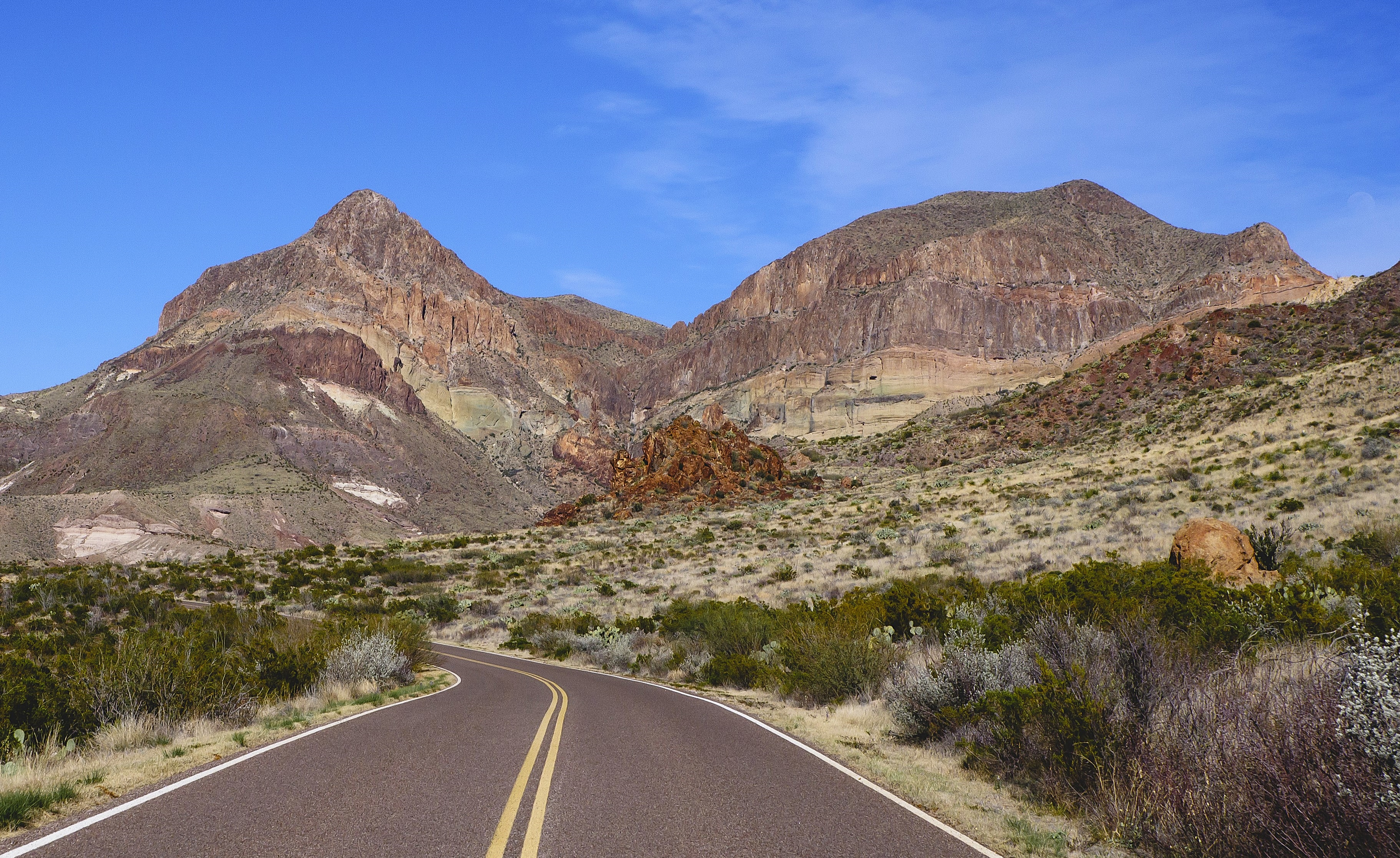
Peak 4540 and Goat from Ross Maxwell Scenic Drive

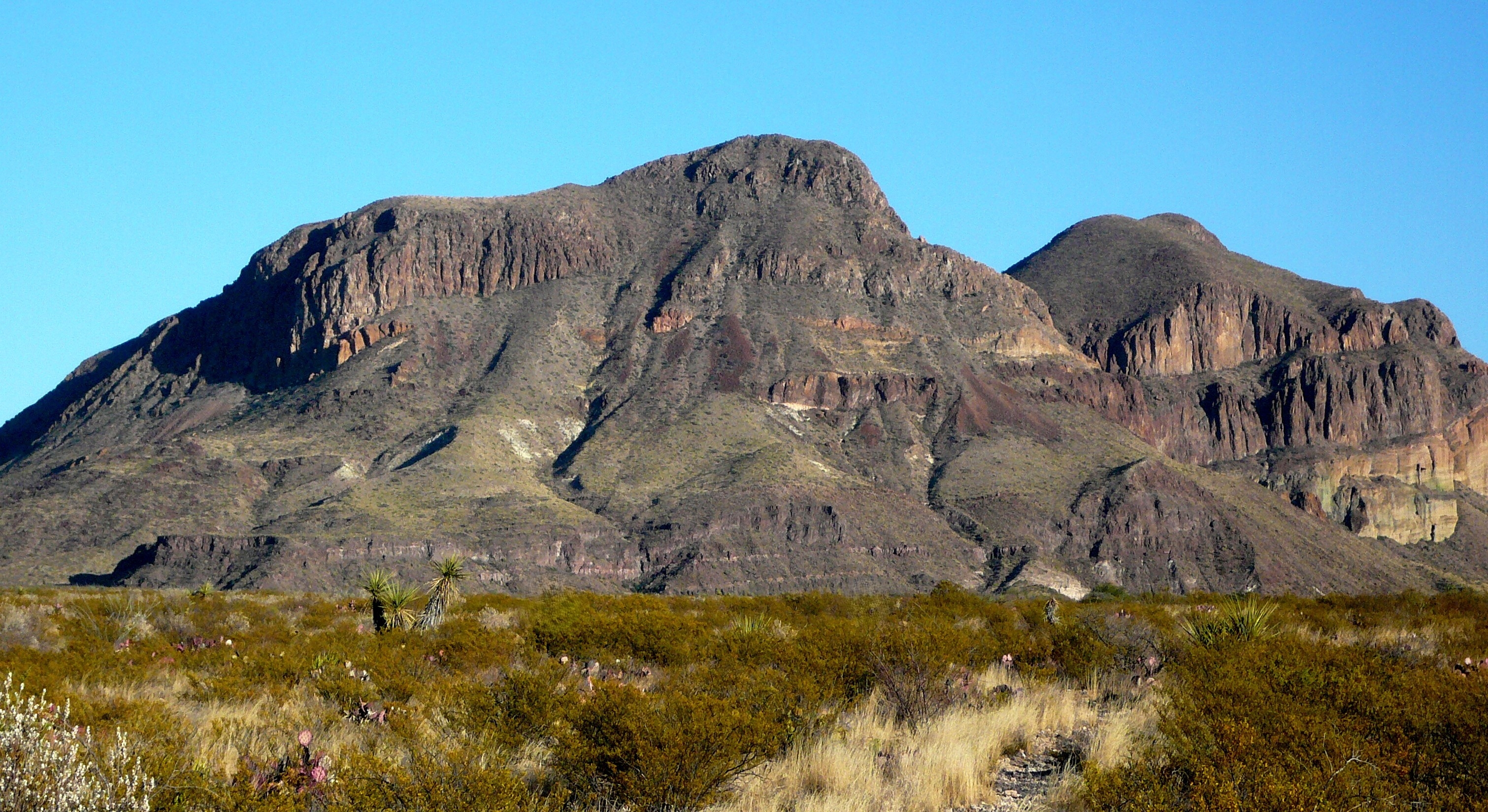
Northwest aspect with summit to right

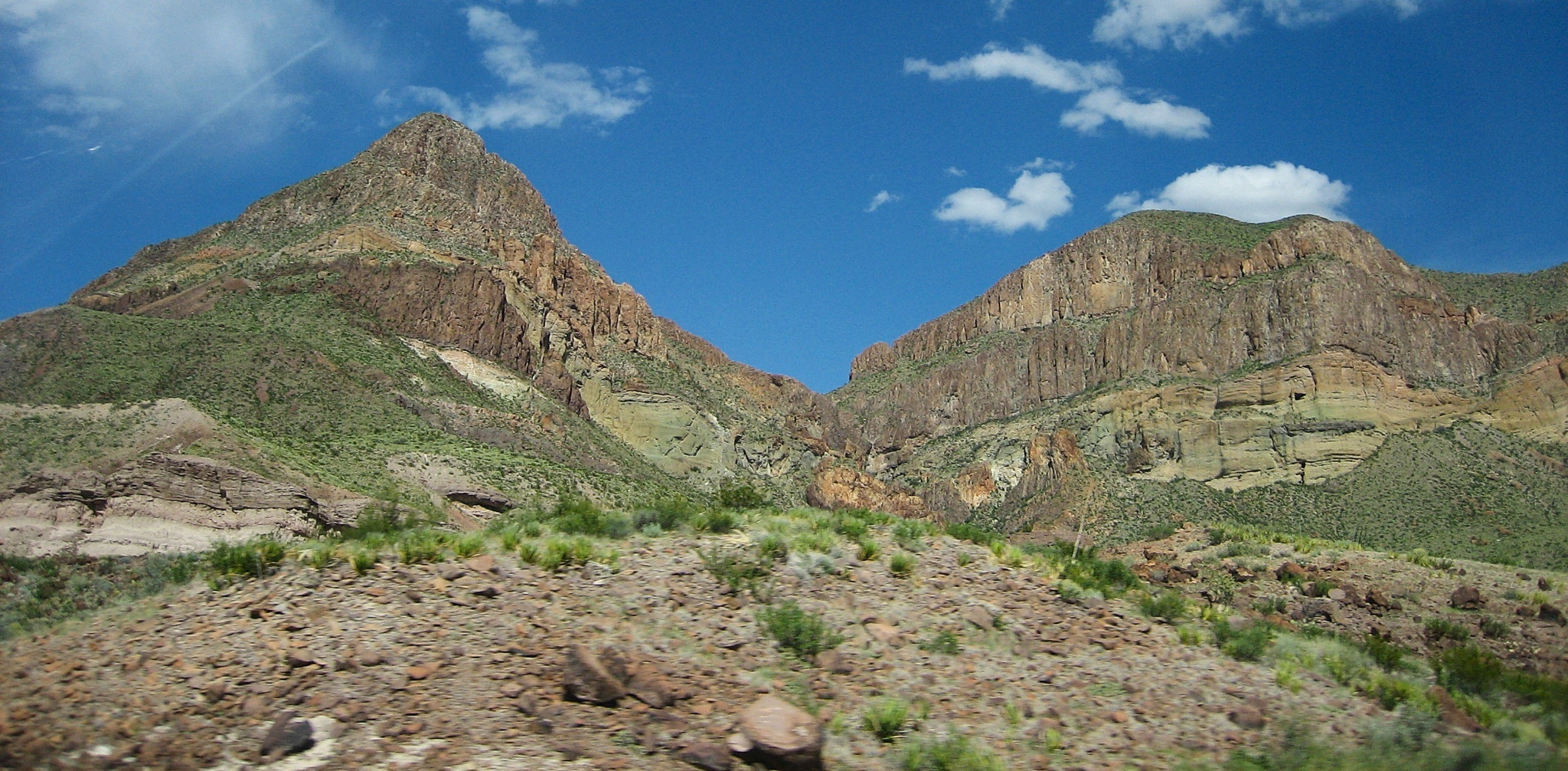
WSW aspect

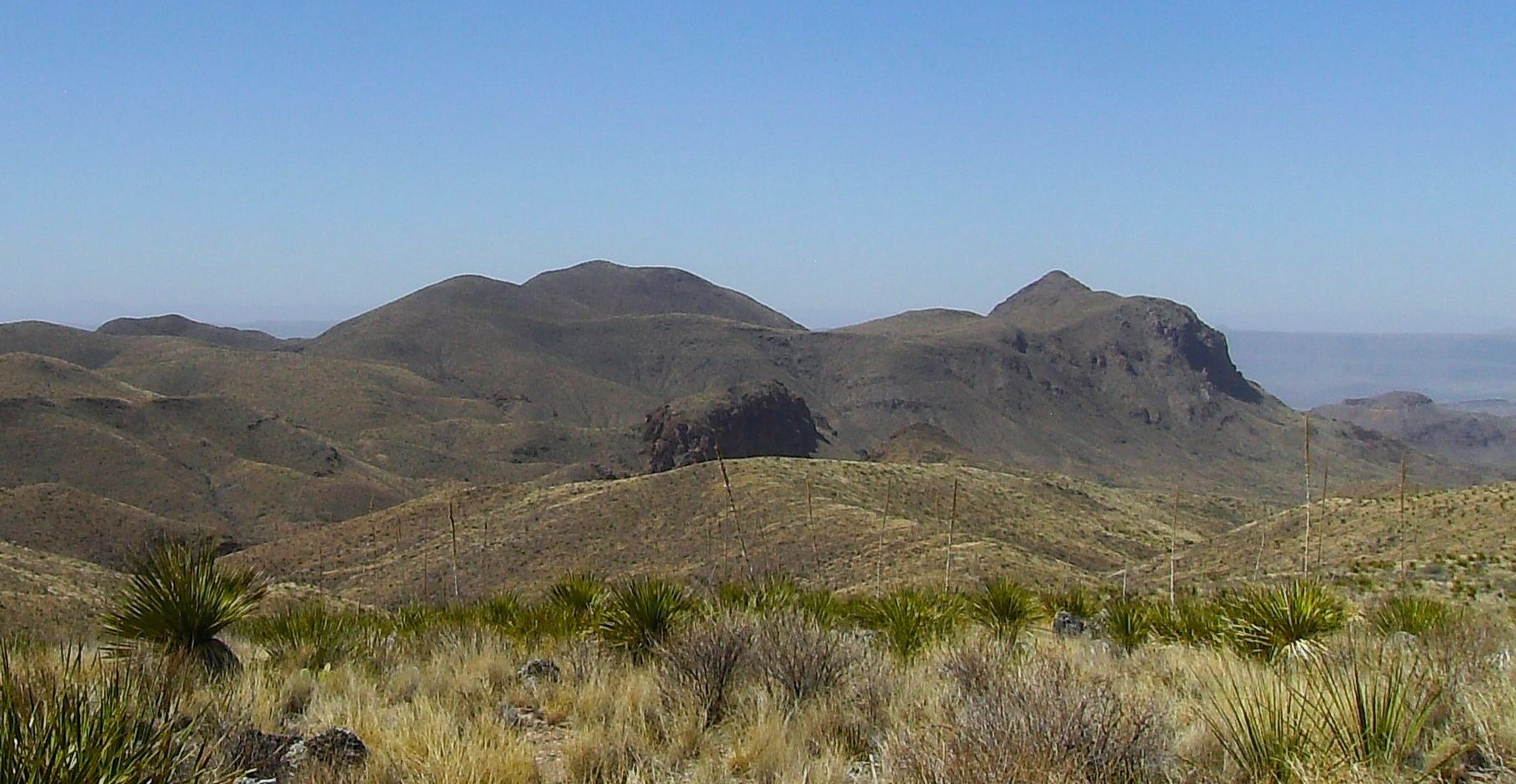
Northeast aspect viewed from Sotol Vista Overlook

Southwest aspect

West aspect
