= Goat Mountain (Glacier County, Montana) =

Mountain in the state of Montana

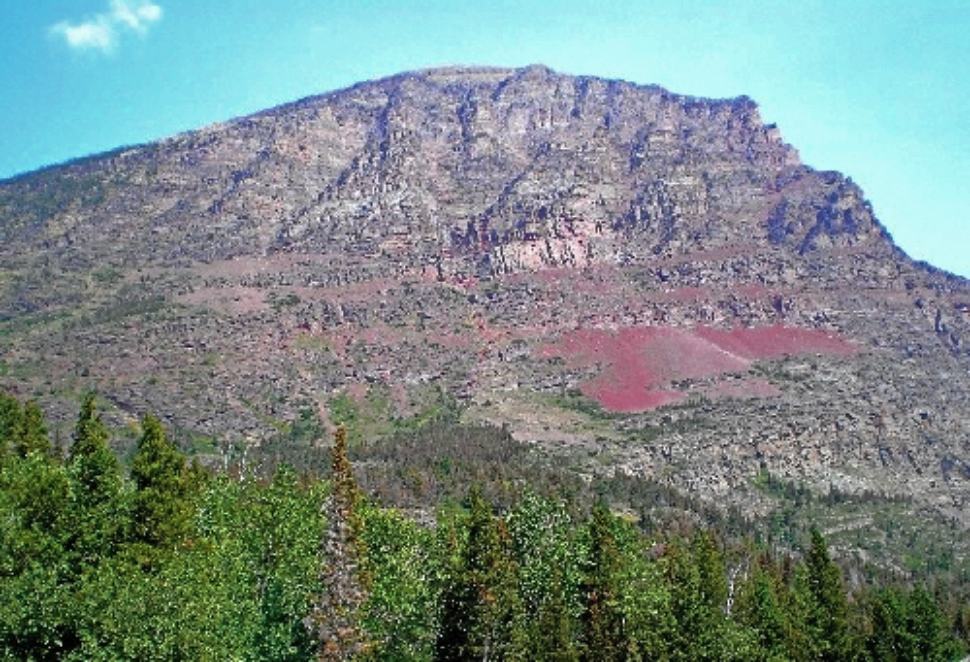
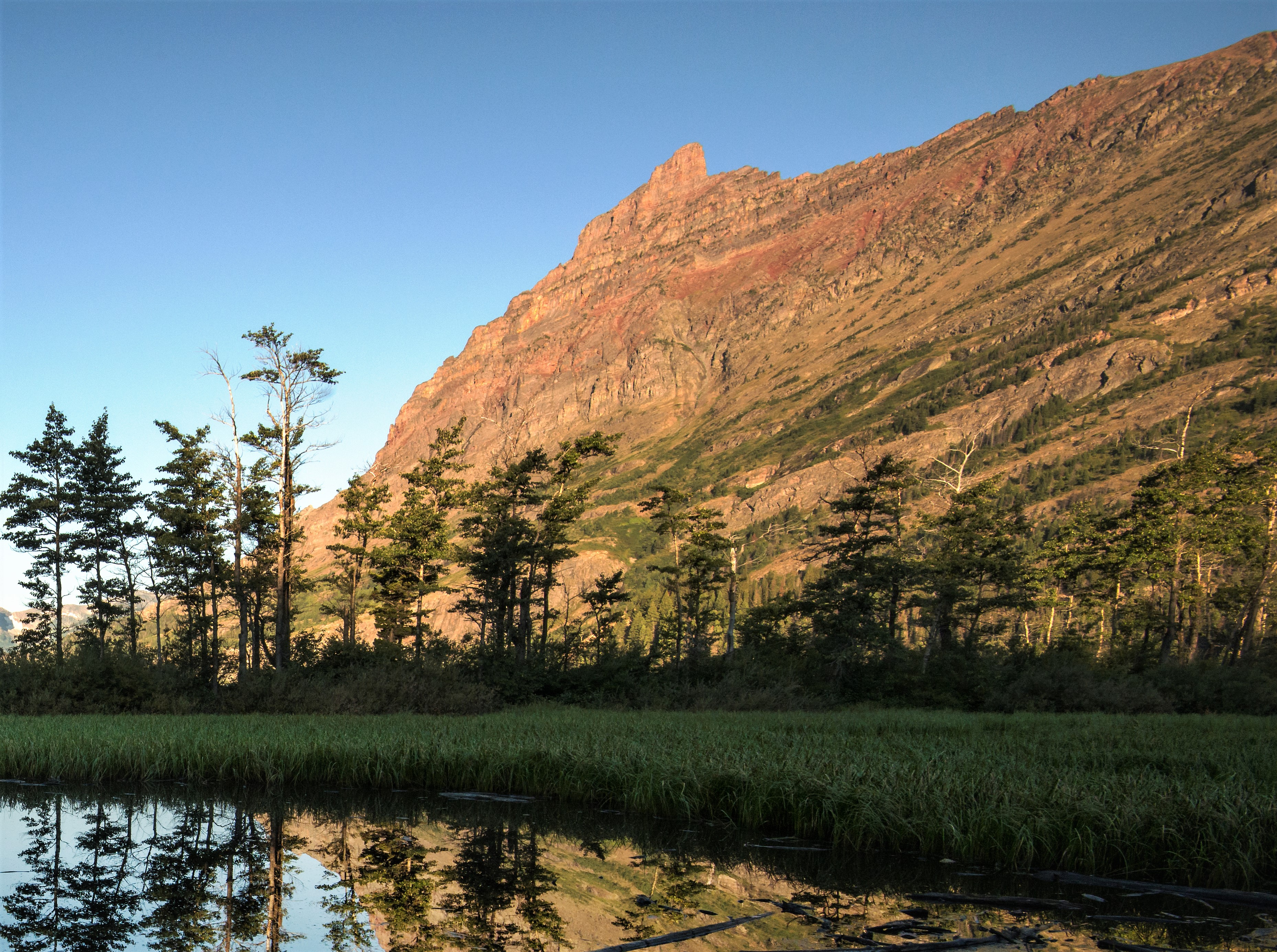
- South aspect seen from Sun Point Point 8376 of Goat Mountain

Highest point
- Elevation: 8,831 ft (2,692 m) NAVD 88
- Prominence: 1,066 ft (325 m)
- Coordinates: 48°42′16″N 113°35′30″W

Geography
- Location within Montana Location within the United States
- Location: Glacier County, Montana, U.S.
- Parent range: Lewis Range
- Topo map: USGS Rising Sun

Climbing
- First ascent: Unknown
- Easiest route: Scramble

Goat Mountain (8,831 ft (2,692 m)) is located in the Lewis Range, Glacier National Park in the U.S. state of Montana. Goat Mountain rises above Otokomi Lake and Goat Lake in the east central section of Glacier National Park.

== Climate ==
Based on the Köppen climate classification, it is located in an alpine subarctic climate zone with long, cold, snowy winters, and cool to warm summers. Temperatures can drop below −10 °F with wind chill factors below −30 °F. Precipitation runoff from the mountain drains into Saint Mary Lake, thence the St. Mary River.

== Geology ==
Like other mountains in Glacier National Park, it is composed of sedimentary rock laid down during the Precambrian to Jurassic periods. Formed in shallow seas, this sedimentary rock was initially uplifted beginning 170 million years ago when the Lewis Overthrust fault pushed an enormous slab of precambrian rocks 3 mi (4.8 km) thick, 50 miles (80 km) wide and 160 miles (260 km) long over younger rock of the cretaceous period.

== Gallery ==
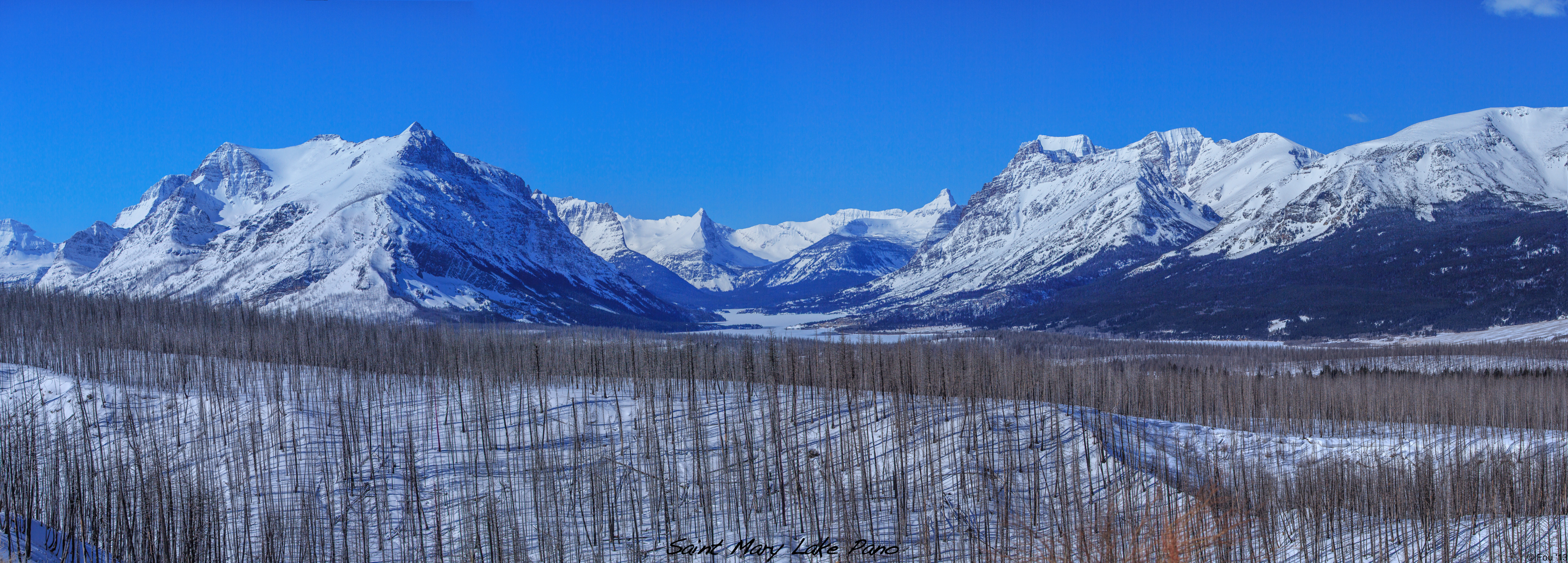

Goat Mountain to right of Saint Mary Lake (see file annotations)

== See also ==
- Mountains and mountain ranges of Glacier National Park (U.S.)
