= Search for Paradise =

- Theatrical release poster
- Directed by: Otto Lang
- Produced by: Lowell Thomas
- Music by: Dimitri Tiomkin
- Distributed by: Cinerama Releasing Corporation
- Release date: September 24, 1957
- Running time: 120 minutes
- Country: United States
- Language: English
- Box office: $6.5 million (est. US/ Canada rentals)

Search for Paradise is a 1957 American documentary film shot in Cinerama. It was directed by Otto Lang and produced by Lowell Thomas with distribution by Cinerama Releasing Corporation.

== Background ==
In October and November 1956, the Cinerama film Search for Paradise, directed by Otto Lang and produced by Lowell Thomas, was filmed in part at Eglin Air Force Base, Florida, under the working title of Search for Shangri-La. The film "tells the story of a veteran officer, who wants 'out' but finds, after searching the world for a 'Shangrila,' [sic] that the U. S. Air Force is 'it.'"

"Some of the action-packed events captured at Eglin include F-100 'Super Sabres' breaking the sound barrier, in-flight refueling of B-47 'Stratojet' medium bombers, landings and mass fly-bys of the latest operational U. S. Air Force aircraft. Hollywood stunt flyer and combat veteran Paul Mantz, was contracted by Stanley Warner to fly his specially built B-25 in filming a number of aerial sequences . The Cinerama camera can be placed in the nose or tail gunnery slot of the World War II aircraft to film the panorama called for in this latest 'wide-curved' screen production." Release by Stanley Warner, Inc., it was expected in the spring of 1957, according to a news article in The Okaloosa News-Journal, Crestview, Florida, in November 1956.

== See also ==
- List of American films of 1957
