= Mountain Goat (motor cycle) =

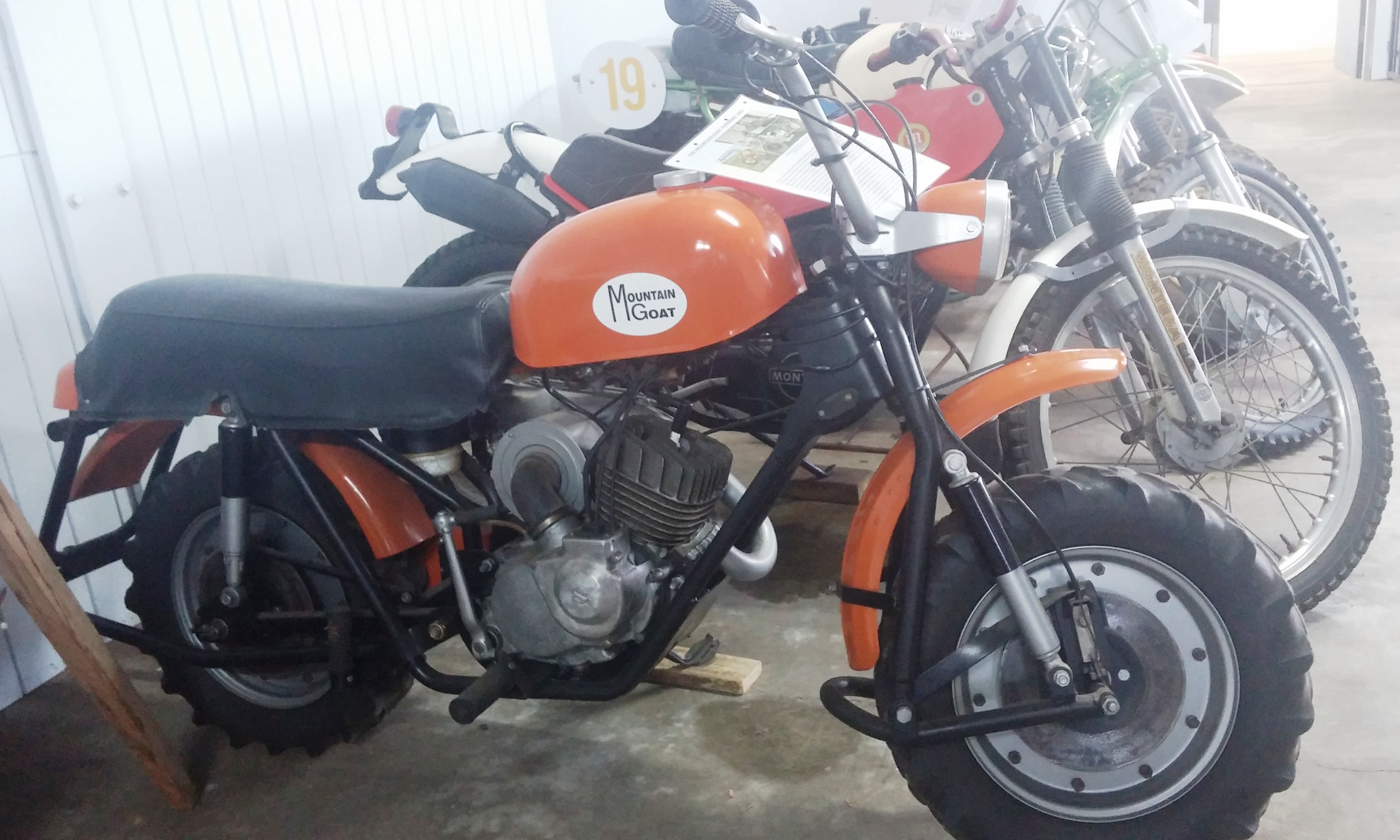
- Mountain goat motorcycle at the Packard and Pioneer museum in Maungatapere, New Zealand
- Manufacturer: Callender Motorcycles
- Production: 1963–1970s
- Class: Utility
- Engine: 80 cc
- Transmission: Four speed
- Frame type: Square section metal tube frame
- Tires: 8 in (200 mm) farm tyres
- Weight: 70 kg (wet)

The Mountain Goat was a motorcycle specifically built in 1963 by Jonny Callender of New Plymouth, New Zealand, for use on rough farm land. It was the first specifically designed farm bike in the world.

== Cyril John (Jonny) Callender ==
Callender, born about 1928, was passionate about motorcycles. He bought his first when he was 15. Three years later he was racing motorcycles in club events at Ōakura and became one of the founding members of the New Plymouth Motorcycle Club. Around this time he became a motorcycle mechanic.

In 1951, Callender began a successful career as a midget car driver winning a number of events. He built his own three-quarter midget, number 62. After an accident in 1956, Callender stopped midget car racing, but continued sponsoring other drivers. He also began making go-karts under the Kalkart brand. In 1957, Callender imported a JBS 500 Formula 3 race car which he raced in the New Zealand Grand Prix at Ardmore 1958 to 1961, as well as races Levin and Ohakea.

Callender became president of the North Taranaki Motorcycle Club and held senior positions at the New Plymouth Speedway Club and the Auto Cycle Union. He ran events and also did announcing.

In 1957, Callender started a motorcycle repair business called Callender Motorcycles. This in turn led to him making the Mountain Goat to meet the needs of the farming community. He also made hand controls for cars and wheel chairs to assist the disabled.

== Development ==
In the early 1960s, Callender spotted a need for a motorbike specifically for use by farmers. He designed the Mountain Goat which was a small tough motorcycle that was designed to handle the rough off-road conditions on New Zealand farms. At that time farmers were primarily using horses, especially in the hill country. Those who were using motor bikes were converting imported British road bikes use on their farms. These bikes were generally heavy, high-geared, and impractical in the rough and rugged Taranaki hill country.

The specifications for the bike, developed in discussions with local farmers, were the ability to go at walking pace without slipping the clutch, have enough power to climb the steep hills, be rugged enough to withstand the rough farm tracks, and light enough to carry. The wheels needed to be discs because spoked wheels got caught in sticks and branches and the back tyre had to have enough traction to handle mud and grip hillsides.

The prototype took two years to develop and in 1963 the bike was put on sale. It was powered by an 80 cc Suzuki motor with a four-speed gearbox, weighed 70 kg, unpainted, and had a low centre of gravity. The low gear enabled the bike to travel at walking pace and its top speed was 50 km/h. The rear tyre was from a rotary-hoe.

Testing was carried out on the tracks around Mount Taranaki and up the mountain itself, although it never reached the summit. The prototype was used by Sir Edmund Hillary and Peter Mulgrew on their 1964 expedition to Nepal to build a schoolhouse in the Himalayas. Mulgrew had lost his feet to frostbite on Mount Makalu in 1961 and the bike was to enable him to move around independently as well as test the machine. Because the fuel tank was damaged in transit, he was only able to have limited use of it. It was Mulgrew who called the bike the Mountain Goat and that became its name.

== Production ==
Production began in an old flour store in Devon Street, New Plymouth. The aim was to make 120 machines a year, but demand was higher after a flurry of articles in magazines and newspapers about the bike. Some were sold to Borneo and the New Hebrides.

Problems soon arose with the government refusing to issue an import licence for the engines and brake hubs. While negotiations continued between Callender and the government, Callender sent a photo of the bike along with Hillary, Mulgrave, and himself to Suzuki in Japan. Suzuki turned the photo into a giant poster on their Tokyo Motor Show stand, along with a replica of the bike. In 1966, the government issued the import licence to allow enough parts to build the 120 bikes per year. By that time, Callender had decided to sell the business to Motor Components of Waitara. Motor Components planned to sell 1,000 bikes per year, but by then Suzuki had commenced production of its own specialised machine. They in turn were followed by the other major Japanese motor cycle manufacturers. Production at the Waitara plant stopped in the 1970s.

Callender sold his New Plymouth shop and moved to Auckland. He died in 1978 aged 50. In total, he sold about 120 Mountain Goats. In 2005, the original prototype was owned by his son Laurie.
