= 27th Academy Awards =

- Date: March 30, 1955
- Site: RKO Pantages Theatre; Hollywood, California and NBC Century Theatre; New York City, New York
- Hosted by: Bob Hope (Hollywood) and Thelma Ritter (New York City)

Highlights
- Best Picture: On the Waterfront
- Most awards: On the Waterfront (8)
- Most nominations: On the Waterfront (12)

TV in the United States
- Network: NBC

The 27th Academy Awards were held on March 30, 1955, to honor the best films of 1954, hosted by Bob Hope at the RKO Pantages Theatre in Hollywood with Thelma Ritter hosting from the NBC Century Theatre in New York City.

On the Waterfront led the ceremony with twelve nominations and eight wins, including Best Picture. Its total wins tied the record of Gone with the Wind (1939) and From Here to Eternity (1953), though those each had thirteen nominations. It was the third film to receive five acting nominations, and the first to receive three in the Best Supporting Actor category. A "rematch" occurred in the category of Best Actor between Marlon Brando and Humphrey Bogart following Bogart's upset victory three years earlier. In an upset (Bing Crosby was the favored nominee), Brando won, now seen as one of the greatest Best Actor wins in Oscar history. This was Brando's fourth consecutive nomination for Best Actor (starting with A Streetcar Named Desire in 1951), a record that remains unmatched to this day.

In an even bigger upset, Grace Kelly won Best Actress for The Country Girl over Judy Garland, who was heavily favored to win for A Star Is Born. Garland could not attend the ceremony, having recently given birth to her third child; cameramen were present in her home so she could give an acceptance speech, only to awkwardly leave when Kelly was announced as the winner. Groucho Marx later sent her a telegram expressing that her loss was "the biggest robbery since Brink's".

Dorothy Dandridge became the first African American actress to receive a nomination for Best Actress.

== Winners and nominees ==
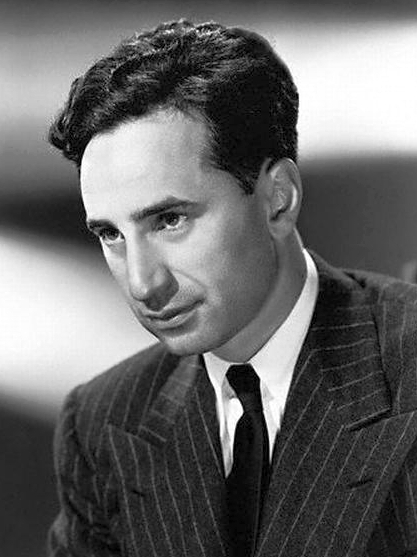
Elia Kazan; Best Director winner

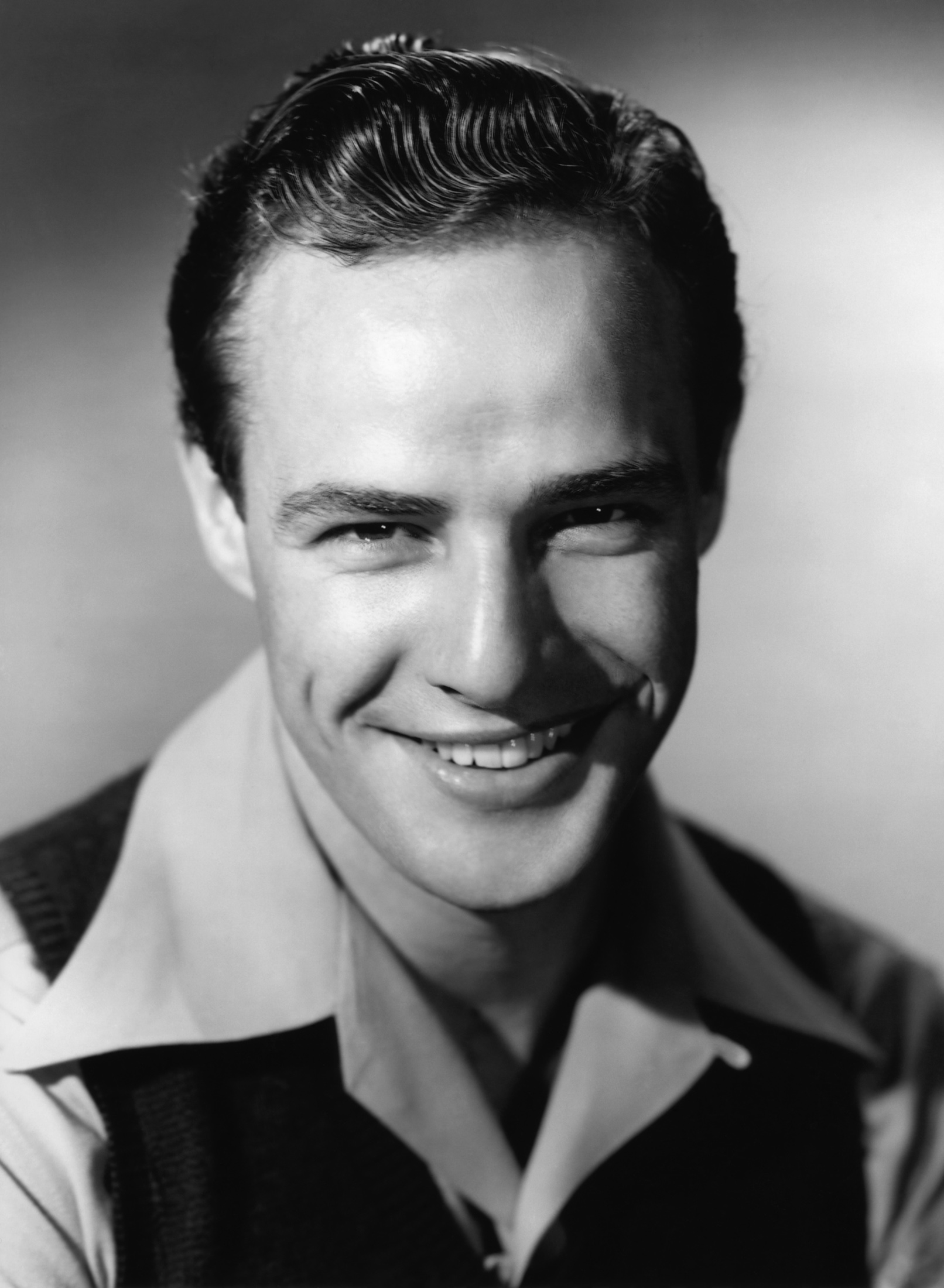
Marlon Brando; Best Actor winner

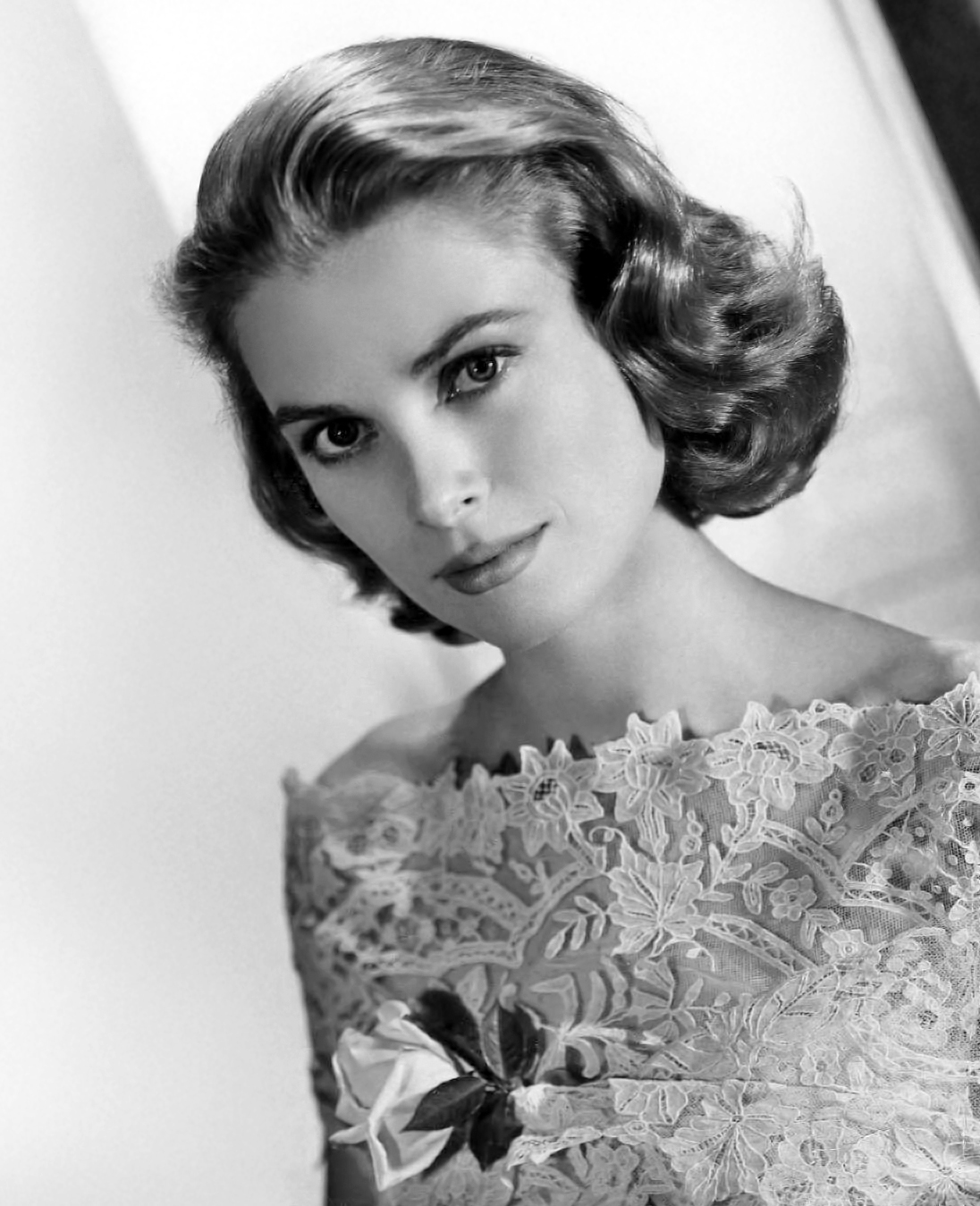
Grace Kelly; Best Actress winner

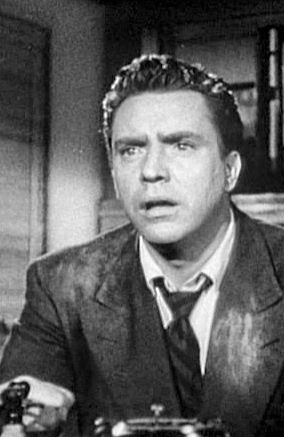
Edmond O'Brien; Best Supporting Actor winner

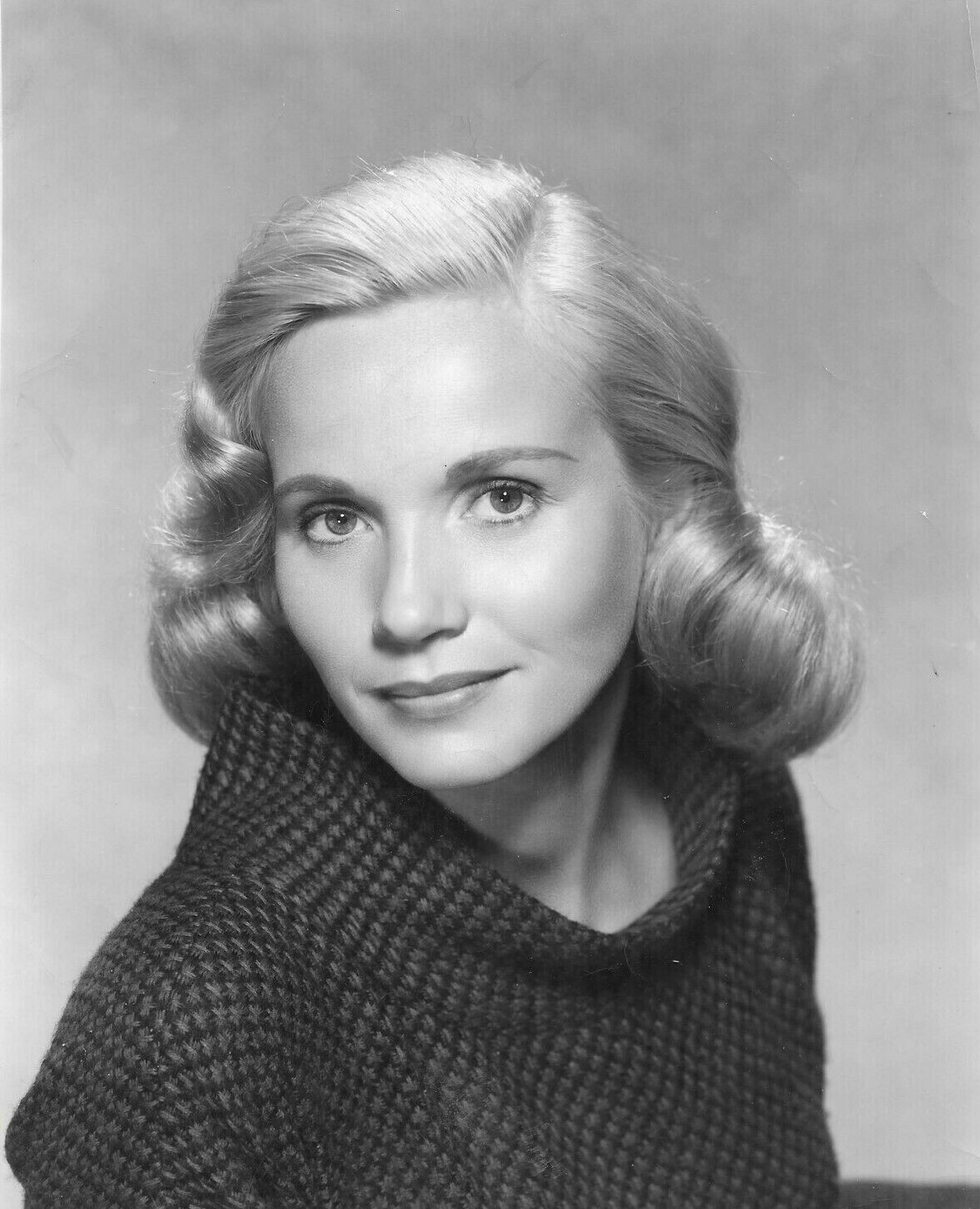
Eva Marie Saint; Best Supporting Actress winner

Budd Schulberg; Best Story and Screenplay winner

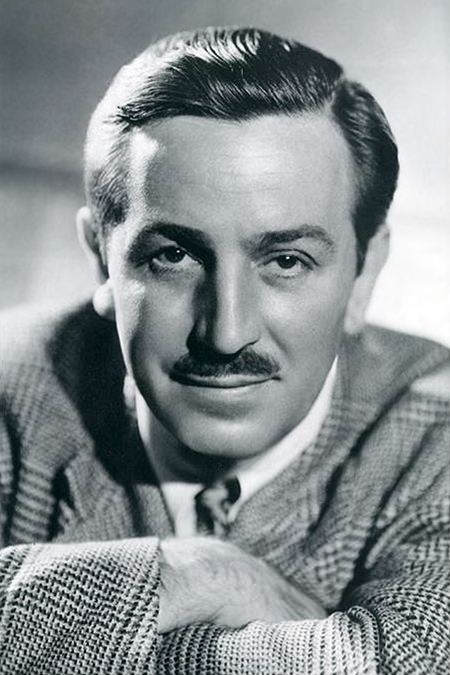
Walt Disney; Best Documentary Feature winner

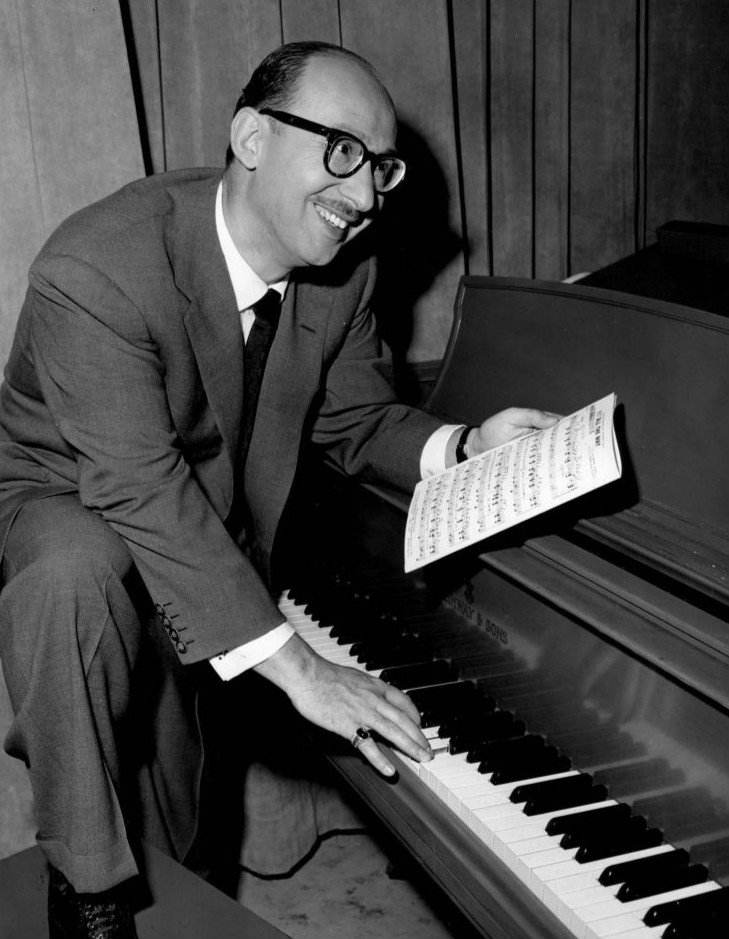
Sammy Cahn; Best Original Song co-winner

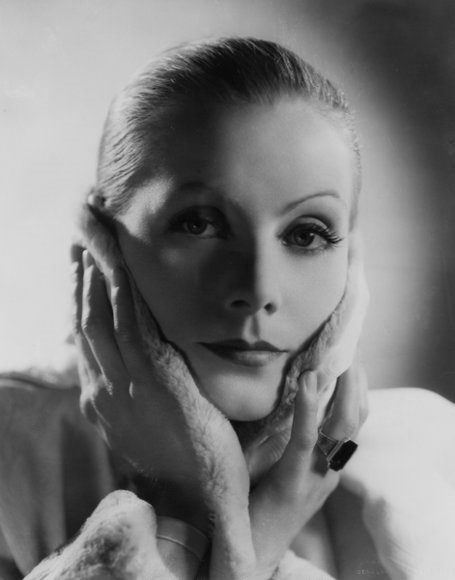
Greta Garbo; Academy Honorary Award winner

=== Awards ===
Nominees were announced on February 12, 1955. Winners are listed first and highlighted in boldface.

**Best Motion Picture**: **On the Waterfront – Sam Spiegel for Columbia Pictures**; The Caine Mutiny – Stanley Kramer for Columbia Pictures; The Country Girl – William Perlberg for Paramount Pictures; Seven Brides for Seven Brothers – Jack Cummings for Metro-Goldwyn-Mayer; Three Coins in the Fountain – Sol C. Siegel for 20th Century Fox	**Best Directing**: **Elia Kazan – On the Waterfront**; George Seaton – The Country Girl; William A. Wellman – The High and the Mighty; Alfred Hitchcock – Rear Window; Billy Wilder – Sabrina
**Best Actor**: **Marlon Brando – On the Waterfront as Terry Malloy**; Humphrey Bogart – The Caine Mutiny as Philip Francis Queeg; Bing Crosby – The Country Girl as Frank Elgin; James Mason – A Star Is Born as Norman Maine; Dan O'Herlihy – Robinson Crusoe as Robinson Crusoe	**Best Actress**: **Grace Kelly – The Country Girl as Georgie Elgin**; Dorothy Dandridge – Carmen Jones as Carmen Jones; Judy Garland – A Star Is Born as Esther Blodgett; Audrey Hepburn – Sabrina as Sabrina Fairchild; Jane Wyman – Magnificent Obsession as Helen Phillips
**Best Actor in a Supporting Role**: **Edmond O'Brien – The Barefoot Contessa as Oscar Muldoon**; Lee J. Cobb – On the Waterfront as Michael J. Skelly aka "Johnny Friendly"; Karl Malden – On the Waterfront as Father Barry; Rod Steiger – On the Waterfront as Charley "the Gent" Malloy; Tom Tully – The Caine Mutiny as William H. De Vriess	**Best Actress in a Supporting Role**: **Eva Marie Saint – On the Waterfront as Edie Doyle**; Nina Foch – Executive Suite as Erica Martin; Katy Jurado – Broken Lance as Señora Devereaux; Jan Sterling – The High and the Mighty as Sally McKee; Claire Trevor – The High and the Mighty as May Holst
**Best Writing (Motion Picture Story)**: **Broken Lance – Philip Yordan**; Bread, Love and Dreams – Ettore Maria Margadonna; Forbidden Games – François Boyer; Night People – Jed Harris and Tom Reed; There's No Business Like Show Business – Lamar Trotti (posthumous nomination)	**Best Writing (Story and Screenplay)**: **On the Waterfront – Budd Schulberg**; The Barefoot Contessa – Joseph L. Mankiewicz; Genevieve – William Rose; The Glenn Miller Story – Valentine Davies and Oscar Brodney; Knock on Wood – Norman Panama and Melvin Frank
**Best Writing (Screenplay)**: **The Country Girl – George Seaton based on the play by Clifford Odets**; The Caine Mutiny – Stanley Roberts based on the novel by Herman Wouk; Rear Window – John Michael Hayes based on the story "It Had To Be Murder" by Cornell Woolrich; Sabrina – Billy Wilder, Samuel A. Taylor, and Ernest Lehman based on the play by Taylor; Seven Brides for Seven Brothers – Albert Hackett, Frances Goodrich, and Dorothy Kingsley based on the story "The Sobbin' Women" by Stephen Vincent Benét	**Best Documentary (Feature)**: **The Vanishing Prairie – Walt Disney**; The Stratford Adventure – Guy Glover
**Best Documentary (Short Subject)**: **Thursday's Children – World Wide Pictures and Morse Films**; Jet Carrier – Otto Lang; Rembrandt: A Self-Portrait – Morrie Roizman	**Best Short Subject (One-Reel)**: **This Mechanical Age – Robert Youngson**; The First Piano Quartette – Otto Lang; The Strauss Fantasy – Johnny Green
**Best Short Subject (Two-Reel)**: **A Time Out of War – Denis Sanders and Terry Sanders**; Beauty and the Bull – Cedric Francis; Jet Carrier – Otto Lang; Siam – Walt Disney	**Best Short Subject (Cartoon)**: **When Magoo Flew – Stephen Bosustow**; Crazy Mixed Up Pup – Walter Lantz; Pigs Is Pigs – Walt Disney; Sandy Claws – Edward Selzer; Touché, Pussy Cat! – Fred Quimby
**Best Music (Music Score of a Dramatic or Comedy Picture)**: **The High and the Mighty – Dimitri Tiomkin**; The Caine Mutiny – Max Steiner; Genevieve – Larry Adler; On the Waterfront – Leonard Bernstein; The Silver Chalice – Franz Waxman	**Best Music (Scoring of a Musical Picture)**: **Seven Brides for Seven Brothers – Adolph Deutsch and Saul Chaplin**; Carmen Jones – Herschel Burke Gilbert; The Glenn Miller Story – Joseph Gershenson and Henry Mancini; A Star Is Born – Ray Heindorf; There's No Business Like Show Business – Alfred Newman and Lionel Newman
**Best Music (Song)**: **"Three Coins in the Fountain" from Three Coins in the Fountain – Music by Jule Styne; Lyrics by Sammy Cahn**; "Count Your Blessings Instead of Sheep" from White Christmas – Music and Lyrics by Irving Berlin; "The High and the Mighty" from The High and the Mighty – Music by Dimitri Tiomkin; Lyrics by Ned Washington; "Hold My Hand" from Susan Slept Here – Music and Lyrics by Jack Lawrence and Richard Myers; "The Man That Got Away" from A Star Is Born – Music by Harold Arlen; Lyrics by Ira Gershwin	**Best Sound Recording**: **The Glenn Miller Story – Leslie I. Carey**; Brigadoon – Wesley C. Miller; The Caine Mutiny – John P. Livadary; Rear Window – Loren L. Ryder; Susan Slept Here – John O. Aalberg
**Best Art Direction (Black-and-White)**: **On the Waterfront – Art Direction and Set Decoration: Richard Day**; The Country Girl – Art Direction: Hal Pereira and Roland Anderson; Set Decoration: Samuel M. Comer and Grace Gregory; Executive Suite – Art Direction: Cedric Gibbons and Edward Carfagno; Set Decoration: Edwin B. Willis and Emile Kuri; Le Plaisir – Art Direction and Set Decoration: Max Ophüls; Sabrina – Art Direction: Hal Pereira and Walter Tyler; Set Decoration: Samuel M. Comer and Ray Moyer	**Best Art Direction (Color)**: **20,000 Leagues Under the Sea – Art Direction: John Meehan; Set Decoration: Emile Kuri**; Brigadoon – Art Direction: Cedric Gibbons and E. Preston Ames; Set Decoration: Edwin B. Willis and Keogh Gleason; Désirée – Art Direction: Lyle R. Wheeler and Leland Fuller; Set Decoration: Walter M. Scott and Paul S. Fox; Red Garters – Art Direction: Hal Pereira and Roland Anderson; Set Decoration: Samuel M. Comer and Ray Moyer; A Star Is Born – Art Direction: Malcolm Bert, Gene Allen and Irene Sharaff; Set Decoration: George James Hopkins
**Best Cinematography (Black-and-White)**: **On the Waterfront – Boris Kaufman**; The Country Girl – John F. Warren; Executive Suite – George Folsey; Rogue Cop – John Seitz; Sabrina – Charles Lang	**Best Cinematography (Color)**: **Three Coins in the Fountain – Milton Krasner**; The Egyptian – Leon Shamroy; Rear Window – Robert Burks; Seven Brides for Seven Brothers – George Folsey; The Silver Chalice – William V. Skall
**Best Costume Design (Black-and-White)**: **Sabrina – Edith Head**; The Earrings of Madame de... – Georges Annenkov and Rosine Delamare; Executive Suite – Helen Rose; Indiscretion of an American Wife – Christian Dior; It Should Happen to You – Jean Louis	**Best Costume Design (Color)**: **Gate of Hell – Sanzo Wada**; Brigadoon – Irene Sharaff; Désirée – Charles LeMaire and René Hubert; A Star Is Born – Jean Louis, Mary Ann Nyberg and Irene Sharaff; There's No Business Like Show Business – Charles LeMaire, Travilla and Miles White
**Best Film Editing**: **On the Waterfront – Gene Milford**; 20,000 Leagues Under the Sea – Elmo Williams; The Caine Mutiny – William A. Lyon and Henry Batista; The High and the Mighty – Ralph Dawson; Seven Brides for Seven Brothers – Ralph E. Winters	**Best Special Effects**: **20,000 Leagues Under the Sea – Walt Disney Studios**; Hell and High Water – 20th Century-Fox Studio; Them! – Warner Bros. Studio

=== Honorary Foreign Language Film Award ===
- To Gate of Hell (Japan) - Best Foreign Language Film first released in the United States during 1954.

=== Honorary Awards ===
- To Bausch & Lomb Optical Company for their contributions to the advancement of the motion picture industry.
- To Kemp R. Niver for the development of the Renovare Process which has made possible the restoration of the Library of Congress Paper Film Collection.
- To Greta Garbo for her unforgettable screen performances.
- To Danny Kaye for his unique talents, his service to the Academy, the motion picture industry, and the American people.
- To Jon Whiteley for his outstanding juvenile performance in The Little Kidnappers.
- To Vincent Winter for his outstanding juvenile performance in The Little Kidnappers.

== Presenters and performers ==
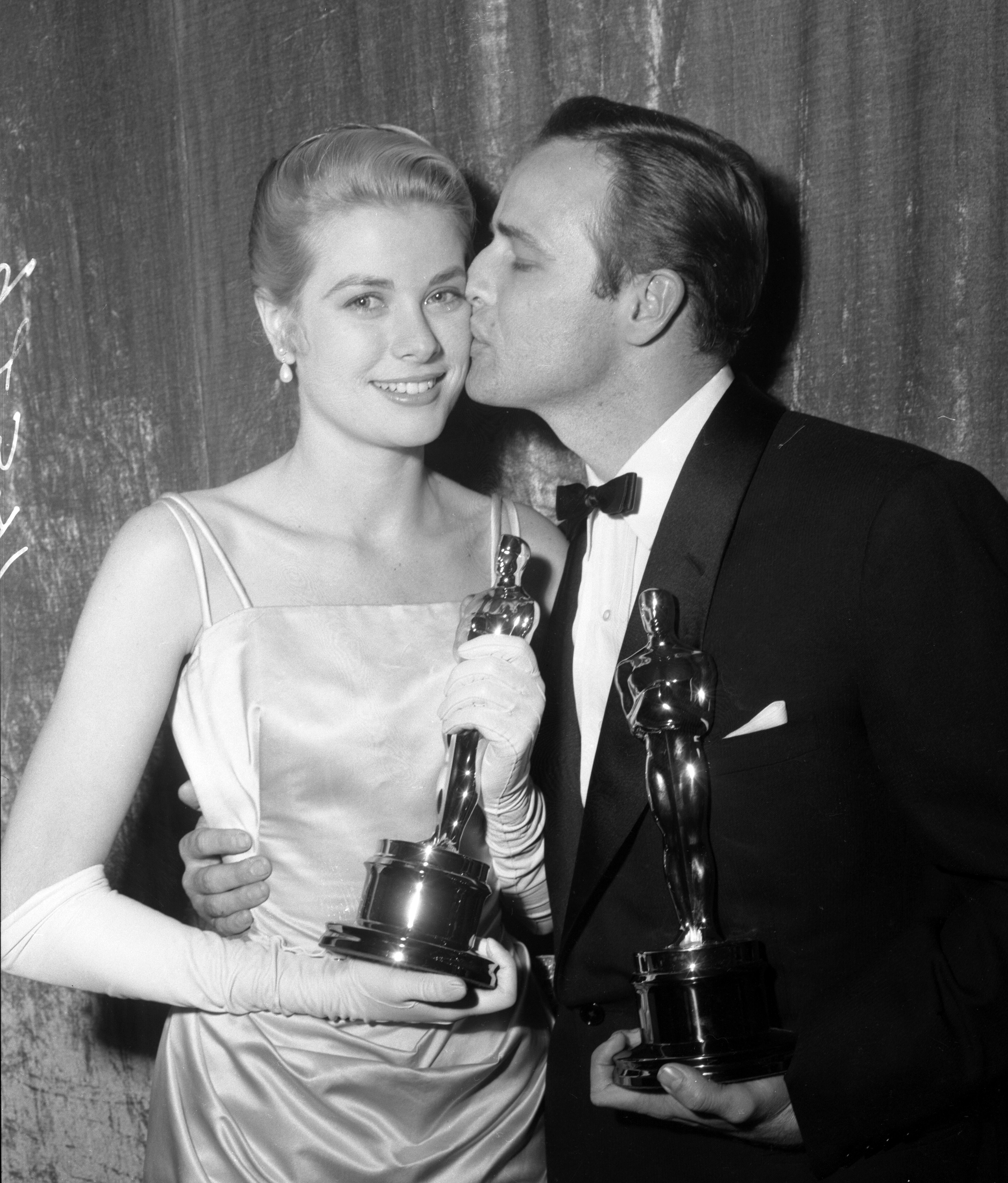
Grace Kelly with Marlon Brando at the Academy Awards in 1955

=== Presenters ===
- Grace Kelly (Presenter: Documentary Awards)
- Donna Reed (Presenter: Best Supporting Actor)
- Lee J. Cobb (Presenter: Best Special Effects)
- Dorothy Dandridge (Presenter: Best Film Editing)
- Nina Foch and Jane Wyman (Presenters: Costume Design Awards)
- Dan O'Herlihy and Jan Sterling (Presenters: Art Direction Awards)
- Humphrey Bogart (Presenter: Best Cinematography, Black-and-White)
- Katy Jurado (Presenter: Best Cinematography, Color)
- Jean Marie Ingels (Presenter: Best Foreign Language Film)
- Charles Brackett (Presenter: Honorary Awards)
- Merle Oberon (Presenter: Honorary Awards — Juvenile Performances)
- Lauren Bacall (Presenter: Scientific and Technical Awards)
- Marlon Brando (Presenter: Best Director)
- Audrey Hepburn, Karl Malden, and Claire Trevor (Presenters: Writing Awards)
- Bing Crosby (Presenter: Music Awards)
- Frank Sinatra (Presenter: Best Supporting Actress)
- William Holden (Presenter: Best Actress)
- Bette Davis (Presenter: Best Actor)
- Edmond O'Brien, Eva Marie Saint, and Rod Steiger (Presenters: Short Subjects Awards)
- Tom Tully (Presenter: Best Sound Recording)
- Buddy Adler (Presenter: Best Picture)

=== Performers ===
- David Rose (musical director)
- Rosemary Clooney ("The Man That Got Away" from A Star Is Born)
- Johnny Desmond and Muzzy Marcellino ("The High and the Mighty" from The High and the Mighty)
- Peggy King ("Count Your Blessings Instead of Sheep" from White Christmas)
- Dean Martin ("Three Coins in the Fountain" from Three Coins in the Fountain)
- Tony Martin ("Hold My Hand" from Susan Slept Here)

== Multiple nominations and awards ==
Films with multiple nominations
Nominations	Film
12	On the Waterfront
7	The Caine Mutiny
7	The Country Girl
6	The High and the Mighty
6	Sabrina
6	A Star Is Born
5	Seven Brides for Seven Brothers
4	Executive Suite
4	Rear Window
3	20,000 Leagues Under the Sea
3	Brigadoon
3	The Glenn Miller Story
3	There's No Business Like Show Business
3	Three Coins in the Fountain
2	The Barefoot Contessa
2	Broken Lance
2	Carmen Jones
2	Désirée
2	Genevieve
2	Jet Carrier
2	The Silver Chalice
2	Susan Slept Here

Films with multiple awards
Awards	Film
8	On the Waterfront
2	20,000 Leagues Under the Sea
2	The Country Girl
2	Three Coins in the Fountain

== See also ==
- 12th Golden Globe Awards
- 1954 in film
- 6th Primetime Emmy Awards
- 7th Primetime Emmy Awards
- 8th British Academy Film Awards
- 9th Tony Awards
