= Blaze Busters =

- Directed by: Robert Youngson
- Produced by: Robert Youngson
- Narrated by: Dwight Weist
- Distributed by: Warner Bros. Pictures
- Release date: December 30, 1950

Blaze Busters is a 1950 short film directed by Robert Youngson. It centers on firefighters and the blazes they must extinguish. It is narrated by Dwight Weist.

The film was nominated for an Academy Award for Best Live Action Short Film at the 23rd Academy Awards.
