= This Mechanical Age =

1954 film

- Directed by: Robert Youngson
- Written by: Robert Youngson
- Produced by: Robert Youngson
- Starring: Dwight Weist; Ward WIlson
- Edited by: Albert Helms
- Distributed by: Warner Bros.
- Release date: August 28, 1954
- Running time: 10 minutes
- Country: United States
- Language: English

This Mechanical Age is a 1954 American short documentary film about the early days of aviation, directed, written and produced by Robert Youngson.

== Synopsis ==
The film uses newsreel footage to tell the story of man's attempts to fly, from early failed attempts to mimic the flying mechanisms of birds, through more conventional approaches including the Wright Brothers, to helicopters and gliders.

== Cast ==
- Dwight Weist as narrator
- Ward WIlson as narrator

== Reception ==
Kine Weekly wrote: "Winner of this year's Academy Award in its class, this is a fascinating exhumation of newsreel items showing the early hopeful modern pioneers of flying, with their fantastic machines and invariable futility. Amusingly depicted, it is commentated with snappy sarcasm – though the same gibes were directed at the Wright Brothers themselves. Free from horror, this is a sure-fire item for any Showman."

== Accolades ==
In 1955, the film won an Oscar for Best Short Subject (One-Reel) at the 27th Academy Awards.
