= 23rd Academy Awards =

- Date: March 29, 1951
- Site: RKO Pantages Theatre, Hollywood, California
- Hosted by: Fred Astaire

Highlights
- Best Picture: All About Eve
- Most awards: All About Eve (6)
- Most nominations: All About Eve (14)

The 23rd Academy Awards were held on March 29, 1951, honoring the films of 1950. All About Eve received a record 14 nominations, surpassing the previous record of 13 set by Gone with the Wind in 1939. It won six Oscars, including Best Picture, and earned writer/director Joseph L. Mankiewicz his second consecutive Best Director and Best Adapted Screenplay awards, the only time such a feat has been accomplished.

All About Eve was the second film, after Mrs. Miniver (1942), to receive five acting nominations. It was the first to receive multiple nominations in two acting categories, and the (to date) only film to receive four female acting nominations—two each for Best Actress and Best Supporting Actress. None was successful, losing to Judy Holliday in Born Yesterday and Josephine Hull in Harvey, respectively.

José Ferrer, then under investigation from the House Un-American Activities Committee over suspected Communist ties, won the Best Actor award despite being given very little chances to win. Marlene Dietrich nearly stole the show by wearing an apparently-painted-on dress that displayed her legs and figure.

Sunset Boulevard was the fifth film with nominations in every acting category, and the second not to win any of them (after My Man Godfrey in 1936).

== Winners and nominees ==
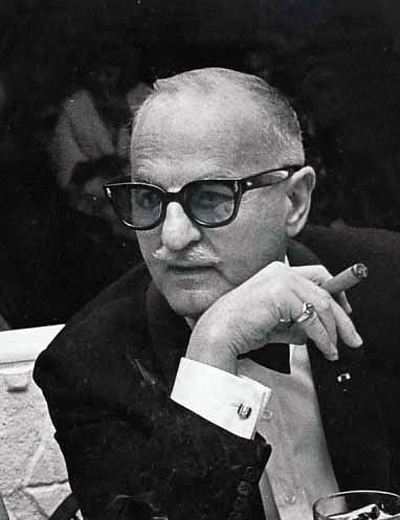
Darryl F. Zanuck; Best Picture winner

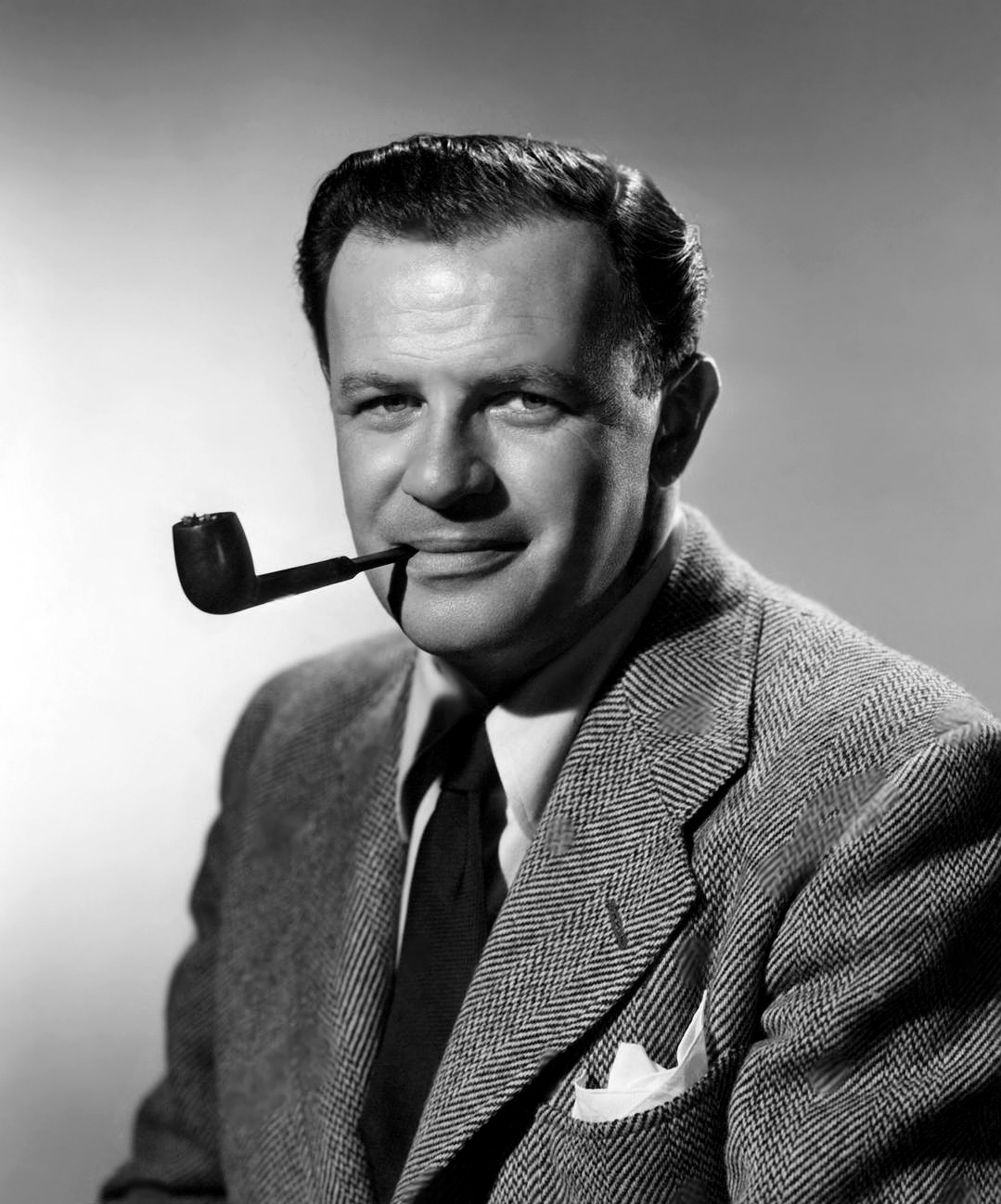
Joseph L. Mankiewicz; Best Director and Best Screenplay winner

José Ferrer; Best Actor winner

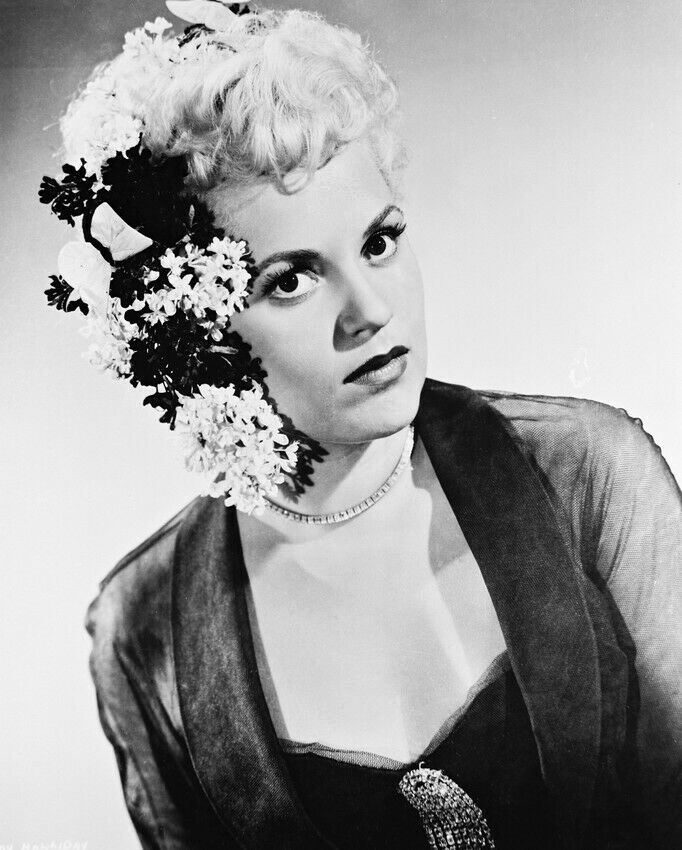
Judy Holliday; Best Actress winner

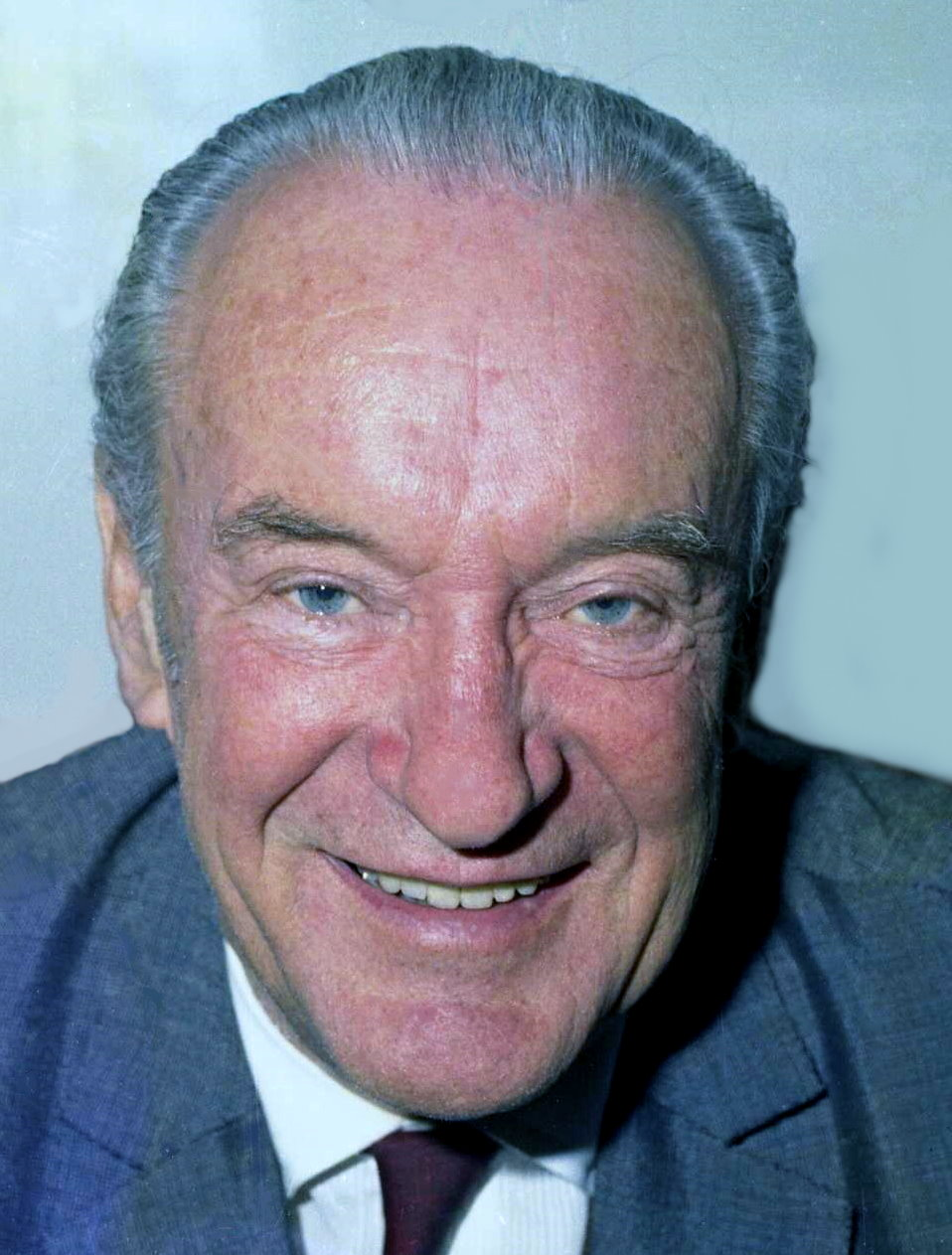
George Sanders; Best Supporting Actor winner

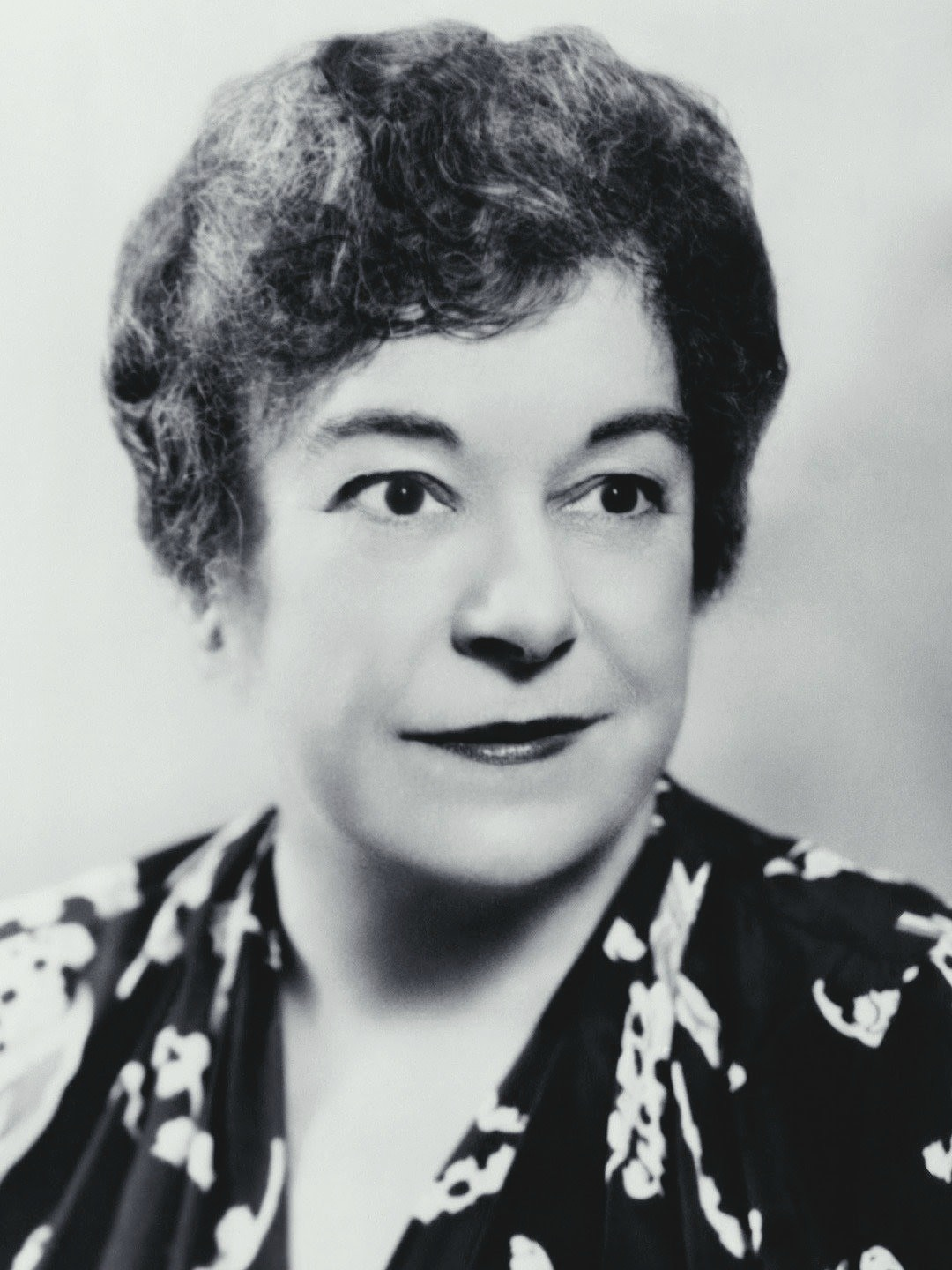
Josephine Hull; Best Supporting Actress winner

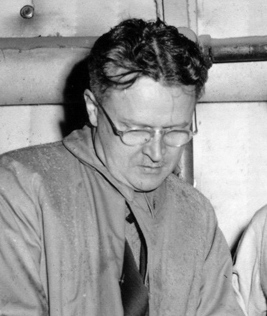
Charles Brackett; Best Story and Screenplay co-winner

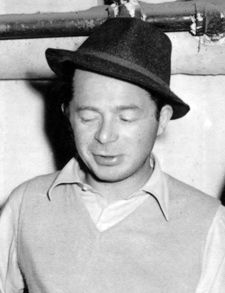
Billy Wilder; Best Story and Screenplay co-winner

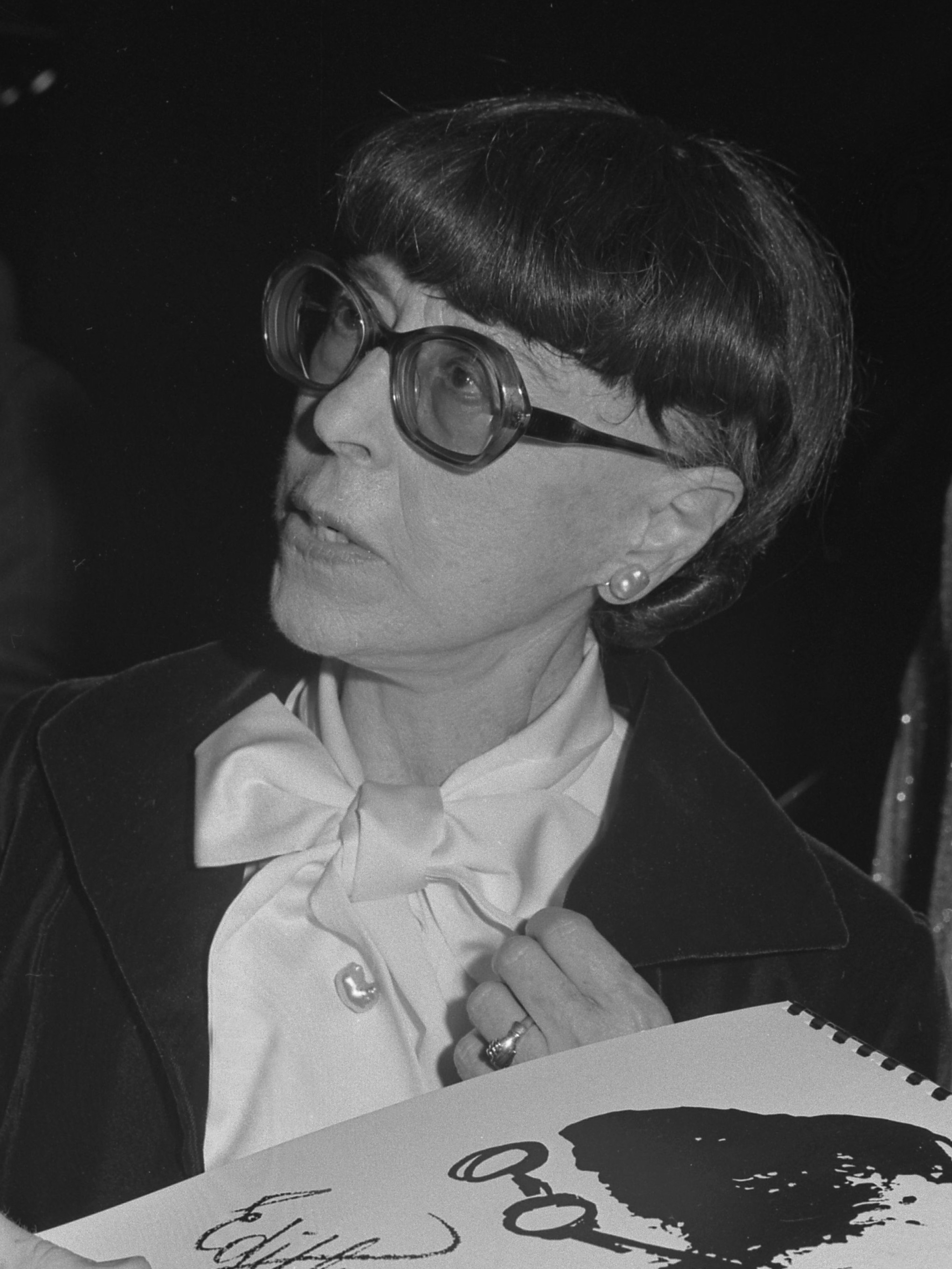
Edith Head; Best Costume Design, Black-and-White and Best Costume Design, Color co-winner

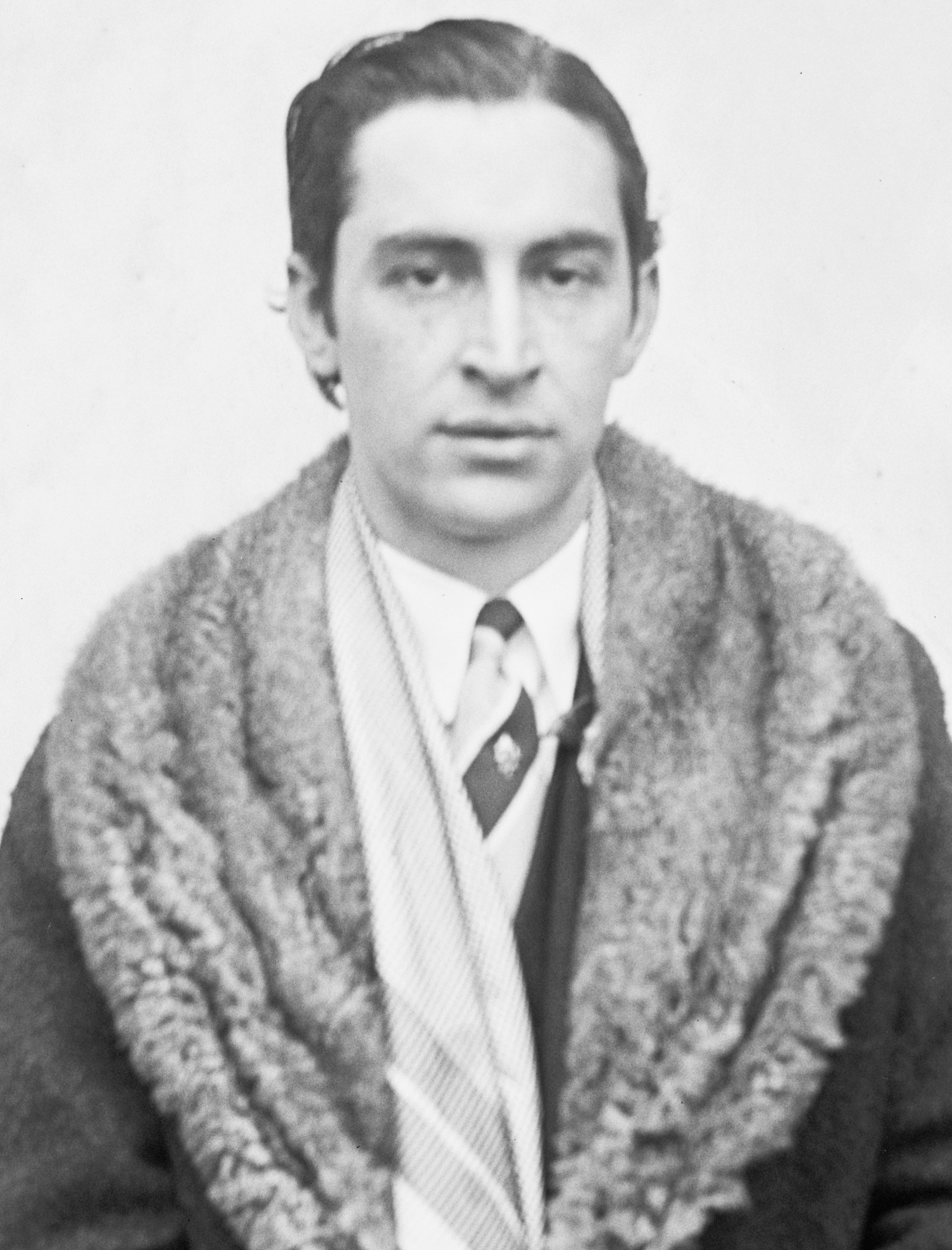
Charles LeMaire; Best Costume Design, Black-and-White co-winner

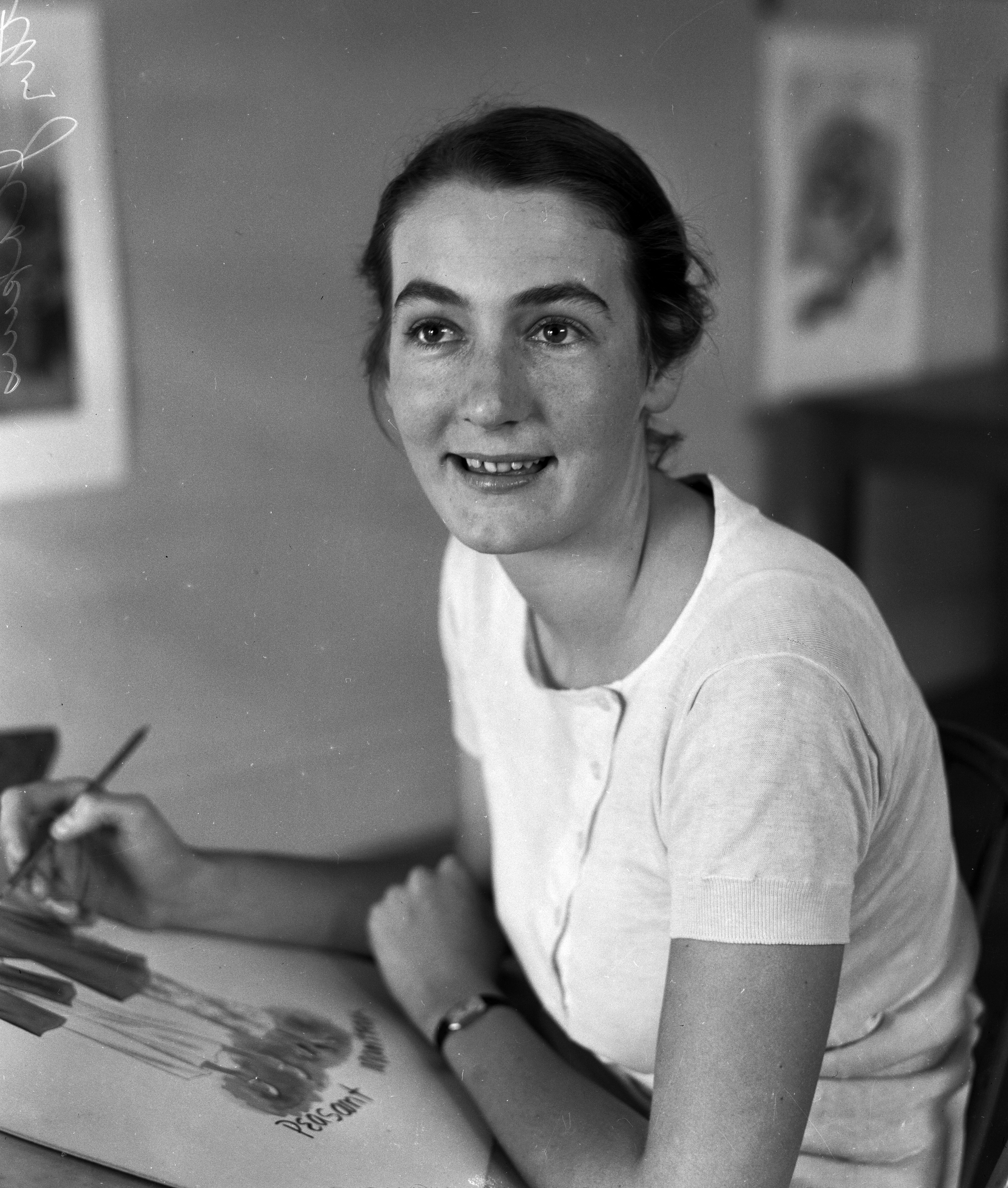
Dorothy Jeakins; Best Costume Design, Color co-winner

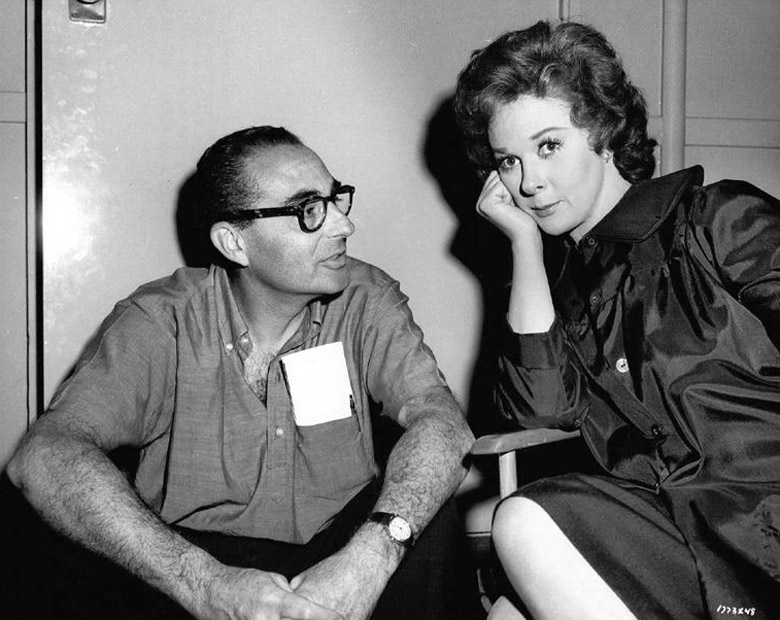
Ralph E. Winters (left); Best Film Editing co-winner

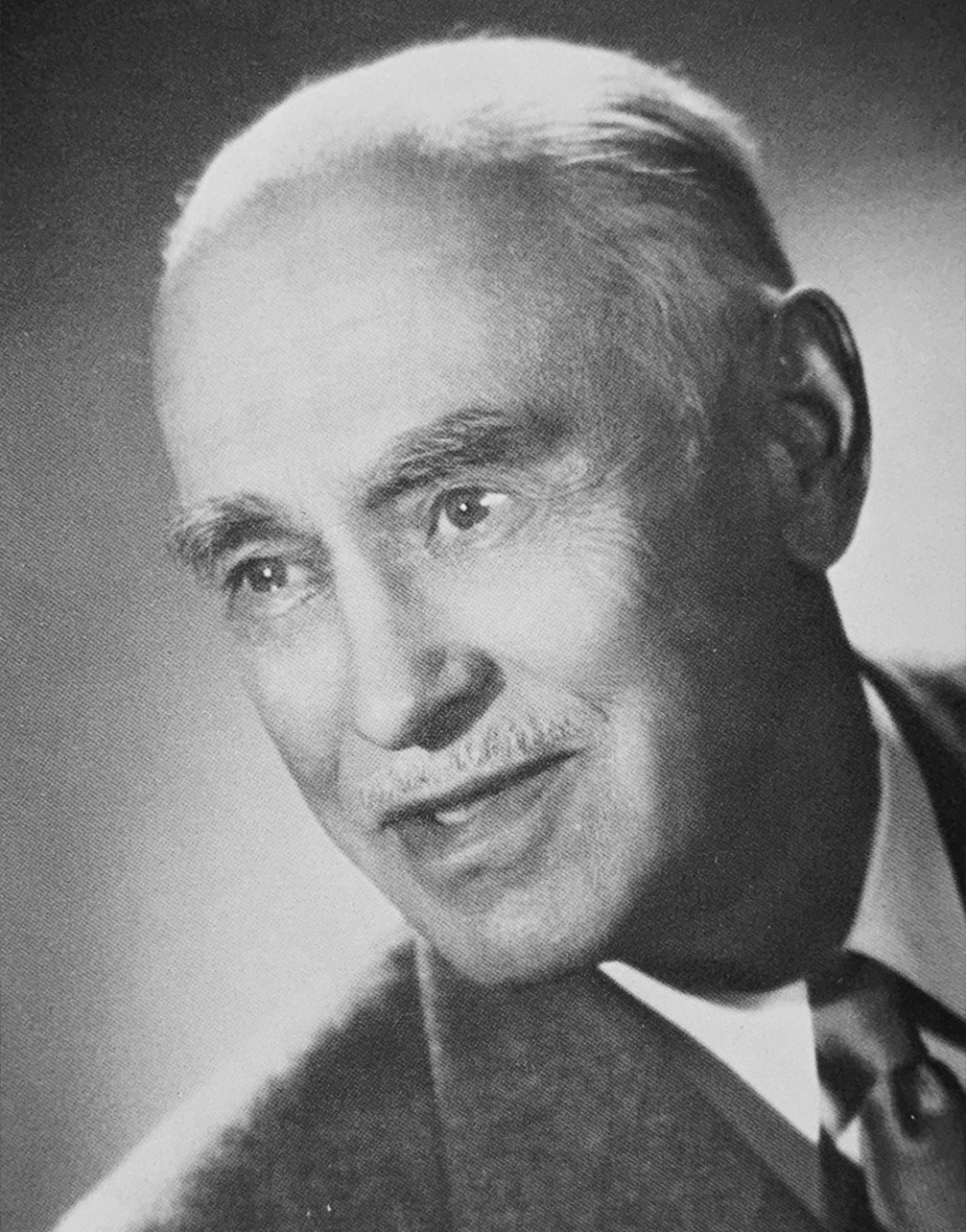
Conrad A. Nervig; Best Film Editing co-winner

=== Awards ===
Nominations announced on February 12, 1951. Winners are listed first and highlighted in boldface.

**Best Motion Picture**: **All About Eve – Darryl F. Zanuck for 20th Century Fox**; Born Yesterday – S. Sylvan Simon for Columbia Pictures; Father of the Bride – Pandro S. Berman for Metro-Goldwyn-Mayer; King Solomon's Mines – Sam Zimbalist for Metro-Goldwyn-Mayer; Sunset Boulevard – Charles Brackett for Paramount Pictures	**Best Directing**: **Joseph L. Mankiewicz – All About Eve**; John Huston – The Asphalt Jungle; George Cukor – Born Yesterday; Billy Wilder – Sunset Boulevard; Carol Reed – The Third Man
**Best Actor**: **José Ferrer – Cyrano de Bergerac as Cyrano de Bergerac**; Louis Calhern – The Magnificent Yankee as Oliver Wendell Holmes Jr.; William Holden – Sunset Boulevard as Joe Gillis; James Stewart – Harvey as Elwood P. Dowd; Spencer Tracy – Father of the Bride as Stanley T. Banks	**Best Actress**: **Judy Holliday – Born Yesterday as Emma "Billie" Dawn**; Anne Baxter – All About Eve as Eve Harrington; Bette Davis – All About Eve as Margo Channing; Eleanor Parker – Caged as Marie Allen; Gloria Swanson – Sunset Boulevard as Norma Desmond
**Best Actor in a Supporting Role**: **George Sanders – All About Eve as Addison DeWitt**; Jeff Chandler – Broken Arrow as Cochise; Edmund Gwenn – Mister 880 as "Skipper" Miller; Sam Jaffe – The Asphalt Jungle as "Doc" Erwin Riedenschneider; Erich von Stroheim – Sunset Boulevard as Max von Mayerling	**Best Actress in a Supporting Role**: **Josephine Hull – Harvey as Veta Louise Simmons**; Hope Emerson – Caged as Evelyn Harper; Celeste Holm – All About Eve as Karen Richards; Nancy Olson – Sunset Boulevard as Betty Schaefer; Thelma Ritter – All About Eve as Birdie
**Best Writing (Motion Picture Story)**: **Panic in the Streets – Edna Anhalt and Edward Anhalt**; Bitter Rice – Giuseppe De Santis and Carlo Lizzani; The Gunfighter – William Bowers and André de Toth; Mystery Street – Leonard Spigelgass; When Willie Comes Marching Home – Sy Gomberg	**Best Writing (Story and Screenplay)**: **Sunset Boulevard – Charles Brackett, Billy Wilder, and D. M. Marshman Jr.**; Adam's Rib – Ruth Gordon and Garson Kanin; Caged – Virginia Kellogg and Bernard C. Schoenfeld; The Men – Carl Foreman; No Way Out – Joseph L. Mankiewicz and Lesser Samuels
**Best Writing (Screenplay)**: **All About Eve – Joseph L. Mankiewicz from "The Wisdom of Eve" by Mary Orr**; The Asphalt Jungle – Ben Maddow and John Huston from The Asphalt Jungle by W. R. Burnett; Born Yesterday – Albert Mannheimer from Born Yesterday by Garson Kanin; Broken Arrow – Albert Maltz from Blood Brother by Elliott Arnold; Father of the Bride – Frances Goodrich and Albert Hackett from Father of the Bride by Edward Streeter	**Best Documentary (Feature)**: **The Titan: Story of Michelangelo – Robert Snyder**; With These Hands – Jack Arnold and Lee Goodman
**Best Documentary (Short Subject)**: **Why Korea? – Edmund Reek**; The Fight: Science Against Cancer – Guy Glover; The Stairs – Film Documents, Inc.	**Best Short Subject (One-Reel)**: **Grandad of Races – Gordon Hollingshead**; Blaze Busters – Robert Youngson; Wrong Way Butch – Pete Smith
**Best Short Subject (Two-Reel)**: **In Beaver Valley – Walt Disney**; Grandma Moses – Falcon Films, Inc.; My Country 'Tis of Thee – Gordon Hollingshead	**Best Short Subject (Cartoon)**: **Gerald McBoing-Boing – Stephen Bosustow**; Jerry's Cousin – Fred Quimby; Trouble Indemnity – Stephen Bosustow
**Best Music (Music Score of a Dramatic or Comedy Picture)**: **Sunset Boulevard – Franz Waxman**; All About Eve – Alfred Newman; The Flame and the Arrow – Max Steiner; No Sad Songs for Me – George Duning; Samson and Delilah – Victor Young	**Best Music (Scoring of a Musical Picture)**: **Annie Get Your Gun – Adolph Deutsch and Roger Edens**; Cinderella – Oliver Wallace and Paul J. Smith; I'll Get By – Lionel Newman; Three Little Words – André Previn; The West Point Story – Ray Heindorf
**Best Music (Song)**: **"Mona Lisa" from Captain Carey, U.S.A. – Music and Lyrics by Ray Evans and Jay Livingston**; "Be My Love" from The Toast of New Orleans – Music by Nicholas Brodszky; Lyrics by Sammy Cahn; "Bibbidi-Bobbidi-Boo" from Cinderella – Music and Lyrics by Mack David, Al Hoffman, and Jerry Livingston; "Mule Train" from Singing Guns – Music and Lyrics by Fred Glickman, Hy Heath, and Johnny Lange; "Wilhelmina" from Wabash Avenue – Music by Josef Myrow; Lyrics by Mack Gordon	**Best Sound Recording**: **All About Eve – Thomas T. Moulton**; Cinderella – C. O. Slyfield; Louisa – Leslie I. Carey; Our Very Own – Gordon E. Sawyer; Trio – Cyril Crowhurst
**Best Art Direction (Black-and-White)**: **Sunset Boulevard – Art Direction: Hans Dreier and John Meehan; Set Decoration: Samuel M. Comer and Ray Moyer**; All About Eve – Art Direction: Lyle R. Wheeler and George Davis; Set Decoration: Thomas Little and Walter M. Scott; The Red Danube – Art Direction: Cedric Gibbons and Hans Peters; Set Decoration: Edwin B. Willis and Hugh Hunt	**Best Art Direction (Color)**: **Samson and Delilah – Art Direction: Hans Dreier and Walter Tyler; Set Decoration: Samuel M. Comer and Ray Moyer**; Annie Get Your Gun – Art Direction: Cedric Gibbons and Paul Groesse; Set Decoration: Edwin B. Willis and Richard A. Pefferle; Destination Moon – Art Direction: Ernst Fegté; Set Decoration: George Sawley
**Best Cinematography (Black-and-White)**: **The Third Man – Robert Krasker**; All About Eve – Milton Krasner; The Asphalt Jungle – Harold Rosson; The Furies – Victor Milner; Sunset Boulevard – John F. Seitz	**Best Cinematography (Color)**: **King Solomon's Mines – Robert Surtees**; Annie Get Your Gun – Charles Rosher; Broken Arrow – Ernest Palmer; The Flame and the Arrow – Ernest Haller; Samson and Delilah – George Barnes
**Best Costume Design (Black-and-White)**: **All About Eve – Edith Head and Charles LeMaire**; Born Yesterday – Jean Louis; The Magnificent Yankee – Walter Plunkett	**Best Costume Design (Color)**: **Samson and Delilah – Edith Head, Dorothy Jeakins, Elois Jenssen, Gile Steele, and Gwen Wakeling**; The Black Rose – Michael Whittaker; That Forsyte Woman – Walter Plunkett and Valles
**Best Film Editing**: **King Solomon's Mines – Ralph E. Winters and Conrad A. Nervig**; All About Eve – Barbara McLean; Annie Get Your Gun – James E. Newcom; Sunset Boulevard – Arthur P. Schmidt and Doane Harrison; The Third Man – Oswald Hafenrichter	**Best Special Effects**: **Destination Moon – George Pal Productions and Eagle Lion Classics**; Samson and Delilah – Cecil B. DeMille Productions and Paramount

=== Honorary Foreign Language Film Award ===
- To The Walls of Malapaga (France/Italy) - voted by the Board of Governors as the most outstanding foreign language film released in the United States in 1950.

=== Honorary Awards ===
- To George Murphy for his services in interpreting the film industry to the country at large.
- To Louis B. Mayer for distinguished service to the motion picture industry.

=== Irving G. Thalberg Memorial Award ===
- Darryl F. Zanuck

== Presenters and performers ==
=== Presenters ===
- Lex Barker and Arlene Dahl (Presenters: Best Art Direction)
- Charles Brackett (Presenter: Honorary Awards)
- Ralph Bunche (Presenter: Best Motion Picture)
- Ruth Chatterton (Presenter: Writing Awards)
- Broderick Crawford (Presenter: Best Actress)
- Marlene Dietrich (Presenter: Best Foreign Language Film)
- Coleen Gray (Presenter: Documentary Awards)
- Jane Greer (Presenter: Best Special Effects)
- Helen Hayes (Presenter: Best Actor)
- Dean Jagger (Presenter: Best Supporting Actress)
- Gene Kelly (Presenter: Music Awards)
- Phyllis Kirk (Presenter: Short Subject Awards)
- Mercedes McCambridge (Presenter: Best Supporting Actor)
- Leo McCarey (Presenter: Best Director)
- Marilyn Monroe (Presenter: Best Sound Recording)
- Debra Paget (Presenter: Best Film Editing)
- Debbie Reynolds (Presenter: Best Cinematography)
- Jan Sterling (Presenter: Best Costume Design)
- David Wayne (Presenter: Scientific & Technical Awards)

=== Performers ===
- Gloria DeHaven and Alan Young
- Frankie Laine ("Mule Train" from Singing Guns)
- Martin and Lewis ("Bibbidi-Bobbidi-Boo" from Cinderella)
- Lucille Norman

== Multiple nominations and awards ==
Films with multiple nominations
Nominations	Film
14	All About Eve
11	Sunset Boulevard
5	Born Yesterday
5	Samson and Delilah
4	Annie Get Your Gun
4	The Asphalt Jungle
3	Broken Arrow
3	Caged
3	Cinderella
3	Father of the Bride
3	King Solomon's Mines
3	The Third Man
2	Destination Moon
2	The Flame and the Arrow
2	Harvey
2	The Magnificent Yankee

Films with multiple awards
Awards	Film
6	All About Eve
3	Sunset Boulevard
2	King Solomon's Mines
2	Samson and Delilah

== See also ==
- 8th Golden Globe Awards
- 1950 in film
- 2nd Primetime Emmy Awards
- 3rd Primetime Emmy Awards
- 4th British Academy Film Awards
- 5th Tony Awards
