= 1951 Academy Awards =

1951 Academy Awards may refer to:

- 23rd Academy Awards, the Academy Awards ceremony that took place in 1951
- 24th Academy Awards, the 1952 ceremony honoring the best in film for 1951
