= Distributors Corporation of America =

American film distribution company

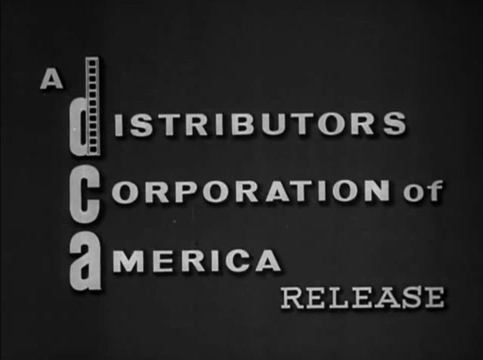
Logo of the company

Distributors Corporation of America (DCA) was an American independent film distribution company which distributed 60 films in the United States between 1952 and 1959.

It was a subsidiary of the Walter Reade Organisation, a British-based firm catering to art houses. The American counterpart DCA initially followed Reade's British policy, issuing or reissuing specialized "prestige" pictures, among them The Wages of Fear (1953), Animal Farm (1954), and I Am a Camera (1955), starring Julie Harris and Laurence Harvey; the latter film ran into censorship from the Production Code because of the original script's treatment of abortion. DCA also handled re-releases, like the 1956 revivals of The Naked City (1948) and Brute Force (1947), both produced by Mark Hellinger and directed by Jules Dassin.

DCA's biggest hit was Robert Youngson's compilation of silent comedies, The Golden Age of Comedy (1958). Originally intended for novelty playdates on the art-house circuit, the film became a blockbuster, endorsed on network television by popular personalities Steve Allen and Jack Paar. DCA scrapped its original ad campaign and created a new series of promotions capitalizing on the critical and popular success of the film's initial engagements.

DCA then specialized in exploitation quickies for theaters and drive-ins. Many of these were European imports. The first to capitalize on the new science-fiction trend was Rodan (1956). The company them began accepting low-budget thrillers from American producers, like Monster From Green Hell (1957). In 1958 the company released Plan 9 from Outer Space, Half Human, The Strange World of Planet X, and The Crawling Eye. Some of these were combined on double-feature programs with British features handled by Walter Reade, such as Time Lock (1957) and Devil Girl from Mars (1954).

Veteran producer Hal Roach had observed the success of The Golden Age of Comedy, in which many of his own films were featured. Roach took over DCA in late 1958, with company president Fred Schwartz remaining with the firm. In 1960 the company was reorganized as Valiant Pictures.

== Filmography ==
- Alraune (1952)
- Le Salaire de la peur (1953) released in the US as The Wages of Fear
- Dreaming Lips (1953) German-language remake of Dreaming Lips (1937)
- Questa è la vita (1954) released in the US as Of Life and Love
- Pane, amore e gelosia (1954) released in the US as Frisky
- Animal Farm (1954)
- Rembrandt: A Self-Portrait (1954)
- Rummelplatz der Liebe (1954) German version of Carnival Story with German-speaking cast
- La romana (1954) released in the US as Woman of Rome
- Long John Silver (1954)
- The Green Man (1955)
- Escapade (1955)
- Pane, amore e... (1955) released in the US as Scandal in Sorrento
- La Vedova X (1955) released in the US as The Widow
- John and Julie (1955)
- Jedda (1955) released in the US as Jedda the Uncivilized
- La bella mugnaia (1955) released in the US as The Miller's Beautiful Wife
- Cast a Dark Shadow (1955)
- The Colditz Story (1955)
- Rock, Rock, Rock (1956)
- Sailor Beware! (1956) released in the US as Panic in the Parlor
- Private's Progress (1956)
- Hell in Korea (1956)
- Die Halbstarken (1956) released in the US as Teenage Wolfpack
- Des Teufels General (1956) released in the US as The Devil's General
- Rodan (1956)
- Il bigamo (1956) released in the US as The Bigamist
- Liane, das Mädchen aus dem Urwald (1956) released in the US as Liane, Jungle Goddess
- Mademoiselle Striptease (1956) released in the US as Plucking the Daisy and Please Mr. Balzac
- Loser Takes All (1956)
- The Silken Affair (1956)
- Please Murder Me (1956)
- The Captain From Köpenick (1956)
- Orders Are Orders (1957)
- The Confessions of Felix Krull (1957)
- Battle Hell (1957)
- The Gold of Naples (1957)
- Time Lock (1957)
- The Surgeon's Knife (1957)
- Monster From Green Hell (1957)
- The Flesh Is Weak (1957)
- Blonde in Bondage (1957)
- The Golden Age of Comedy (1958)
- Le rouge et le noir (1958) released in the US as The Red and the Black
- The Crawling Eye (1958)
- Plan 9 from Outer Space (1958)
- Animals United (1986)
