= I Never Forget a Face =

- Directed by: Robert Youngson
- Written by: Robert Youngson
- Produced by: Robert Youngson
- Starring: Dwight Weist; Ward Wilson; Hiram Johnson
- Narrated by: Dwight Weist
- Edited by: Albert Helmes
- Production company: Warner Bros.
- Distributed by: Warner Bros.
- Release date: April 28, 1956
- Running time: 11 minutes
- Country: United States
- Language: English

I Never Forget a Face is a 1956 American documentary short film directed, written and produced by Robert Youngson.

== Synopsis ==
The film consists of a series of classic silent clips with narration by radio announcer Dwight Weist and veteran film narrator Ward Wilson.

== Cast ==
- Dwight Weist
- Ward Wilson
- Hiram Johnson

== Accolades ==
The film was nominated for the 1956 Academy Award for Best Live Action Short Film (one-reel sub-category).

== See also ==
- List of American films of 1956
