= Susan Slept Here =

1954 film by Frank Tashlin

- Theatrical release poster
- Directed by: Frank Tashlin
- Screenplay by: Alex Gottlieb
- Based on: Susan; 1951 play by Steve Fisher; Alex Gottlieb
- Produced by: Harriet Parsons
- Starring: Dick Powell; Debbie Reynolds; Anne Francis
- Cinematography: Nicholas Musuraca
- Edited by: Harry Marker
- Music by: Leigh Harline
- Production company: RKO Radio Pictures
- Distributed by: RKO Radio Pictures
- Release date: July 14, 1954
- Running time: 98 minutes
- Country: United States
- Language: English
- Box office: $2.25 million (US)

Susan Slept Here is a 1954 American romantic comedy film directed by Frank Tashlin and starring Dick Powell (in his last film role) and Debbie Reynolds. Shot in Technicolor, the film is based on the 1951 play of the same name by Steve Fisher and Alex Gottlieb. Tashlin later revised the film's plotline and reused it in 1962 for the production Bachelor Flat. Comedian Red Skelton has a minor role.

== Plot ==
Mark Christopher is a successful 35-year-old Hollywood screenwriter who has suffered from partial writer's block since winning an Academy Award and has been unable to produce a decent script. One Christmas Eve, he receives an unexpected and very unwanted surprise present.

Vice Squad Sergeant Sam Hanlon brings 17-year-old Susan Landis to Mark's luxurious apartment. Susan had been abandoned by her mother and was arrested for vagrancy and hitting a sailor over the head with a beer bottle. Not wanting to keep her in jail over the holidays and aware that Mark was interested in writing a script about juvenile delinquency, the kindhearted cop decides to bend the rules (much to the disapproval of his partner). Hanlon suggests that Susan stay with Mark until her arraignment the day after Christmas.

Mark is naturally appalled, but is eventually persuaded to take the girl in. This does not go over too well with his longtime fiancée, Isabella Alexander, the demanding daughter of a senator. Isabella's jealousy grows when Susan develops a crush on Mark. Mark's secretary Maude Snodgrass, his best friend Virgil, and his lawyer Harvey Butterworth do their best to keep the situation under control.

When Harvey lets slip that Susan will likely stay in a juvenile detention facility until she is 18, Mark impulsively takes her to Las Vegas and marries her. The marriage, he explains to his friends, will last for just long enough to convince the judge that Susan has made good. To avoid consummating the marriage, he takes Susan out dancing until she collapses with fatigue.

Mark then slips away to a cabin in the Sierra Nevada mountains to work on his script with Maude. The marriage is reported in the newspapers. Enraged, Isabella confronts Susan, but is hauled away by Hanlon and his partner.

Some weeks later, Isabella finds Mark in the cabin. She has calmed down, but Mark says he thinks they are not really suited to each other. Susan also arrives, determined to win Mark over to a real marriage. She is encouraged and supported by Maude, who still regrets leaving her childhood love behind to attempt an acting career in Hollywood. Susan refuses to sign the annulment papers, while Mark still refuses to consummate the marriage.

When Susan is seen eating strawberries and pickles, Mark's friend assumes that she is pregnant and tells Mark. Mark thinks Virgil is responsible, so he hits Virgil in the face. Susan eventually explains to Mark that she ate strawberries and pickles because she just likes it. Mark has his own explanation: he is in love with Susan but is worried about their age difference. Susan tells him all the reasons that they should stay married. Mark keeps talking about their age difference as Susan leads him to the bedroom.

== Cast ==
- Dick Powell as Mark Christopher
- Debbie Reynolds as Susan Beauregard Landis
- Anne Francis as Isabella Alexander
- Glenda Farrell as Maude Snodgrass
- Alvy Moore as Virgil, Mark's assistant
- Horace McMahon as Sergeant Monty Maizel
- Herb Vigran as Sergeant Sam Hanlon
- Les Tremayne as Harvey Butterworth, Mark's lawyer
- Mara Lane as Marilyn, Mark's neighbor
- Rita Johnson as Dr. Rawley, Harvey's psychiatrist
- Maidie Norman as Georgette, Mark's maid
- Red Skelton as Oswald (uncredited)
- Ellen Corby as coffee shop waitress (uncredited)
- Benny Rubin as Sylvester, the janitor (uncredited)
- Barbara Darrow as Miss Jennings, Dr. Rawley's secretary (uncredited)

== Production ==
=== Original play ===
The film is based on the play Susan by Alex Gottlieb and Steve Fisher, which was originally titled A Present for Joe. In July 1951, it was presented in Los Angeles at the Circle Theatre, with Robert Rockwell, Beverly Long and Mabel Albertson who directed it. The Los Angeles Times said the play "should prove the source of amusement for those who know the film town" but "the show doesn't have enough substance to provide an acceptable general entertainment."

=== Development ===
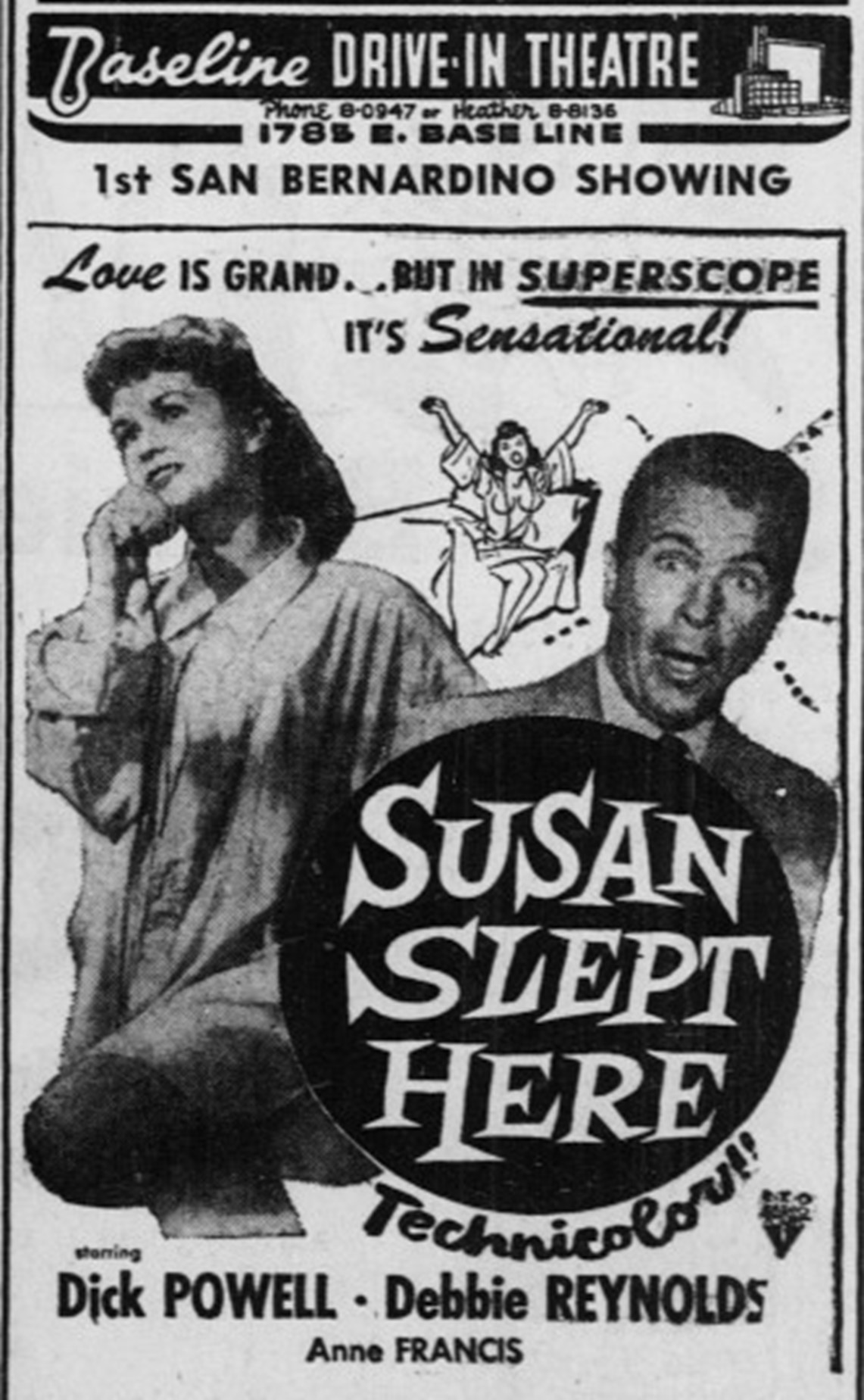
Drive-in advertisement from 1954

Gottlieb wrote a script version and decided to produce. In July 1952, Gottlieb signed a contract with MGM to borrow 20-year-old Debbie Reynolds to play the lead. In That same month, David Wayne and Dan Dailey joined the cast, with Dailey borrowed from 20th Century Fox to play the male lead. Frank Tashlin agreed to direct and Mickey Rooney replaced David Wayne.

In October 1953, Gottlieb sold the entire package to RKO. Then Rooney and Dailey dropped out due to the fact the film would be shot later. Harriet Parsons was assigned to produce and Robert Mitchum was announced as star. Mitchum, however, refused the role and was penalized $40,000 by RKO for doing so.

Dick Powell, skirting 50 years old at the time, had been focusing on directing and had just left directing the play The Caine Mutiny Court Martial, but agreed to play the lead.

Alvy Moore, who had understudied David Wayne on stage in Mister Roberts, was signed to play the role originally intended for Wayne and then Mickey Rooney.

Anne Francis was borrowed from 20th Century Fox just before being dropped by that studio. She stated to reporters that the film "will probably do more for me than any of the others" because "I'm given the chance to act and not just be a piece of scenery."

=== Shooting ===
Filming started December 1953 and finished by January 1954. Reynolds later admitted having "a mad crush on" Dick Powell while making the film and that "he taught me common courtesy and to treat my crew and colleagues with equal respect."

== Reception ==
Reynolds liked the film, later stating "that little comedy made $5,500,000, pulled RKO out of the red and then Howard Hughes sold the studio". It was purchased by Desi Arnaz and Lucille Ball in 1957.

=== Accolades ===
Jack Lawrence (music) and Richard Myers (lyrics) were nominated for the Academy Award for Best Music, Original Song, for "Hold My Hand", while John O. Aalberg was nominated for Best Sound, Recording.

== See also ==
- List of Christmas films
