= Hold My Hand (1953 song) =

Song
- Written: 1950
- Published: 1953
- Songwriter(s): Jack Lawrence, Richard Myers

"Hold My Hand" is a popular song, written by Jack Lawrence and Richard Myers. It was written in 1950 but not published until 1953.

== Don Cornell version ==
The hit version in 1953 was a recording by Don Cornell. The song was featured in the film Susan Slept Here (1954), and was nominated for the 1954 Academy Award for Best Song. Cornell recorded on the Coral Records label. His version of "Hold My Hand" was produced by Bob Thiele. It reached No.1 in the UK Singles Chart for four weeks in October 1954, and peaked at No.2 on the US Most Played By Disc Jockeys chart.

== Other recordings ==
"Hold My Hand" has also been recorded by:

- Stanley Black
- Nat King Cole
- Larry Cross with orchestra and Enoch Light
- Arild Andresen, piano with guitar and bass recorded it in Oslo on March 11, 1955, as the first melody of the medley "Klaver-Cocktail No. 2" along with "Just One More Chance" and "Dedicated to You". The medley was released on the 78 rpm record His Master's Voice A.L. 2513.
