= Jet Carrier =

1954 film

- Produced by: Otto Lang
- Distributed by: Twentieth Century-Fox Film Corporation
- Release date: August 1954
- Running time: 17 minutes
- Country: United States
- Language: English

Jet Carrier is a 1954 American short documentary film produced by Otto Lang as a CinemaScope Special. It was nominated for two Academy Awards - one for Best Documentary Short, and the other for Best Two-Reel Short. It was filmed aboard the aircraft carrier USS Yorktown.
