= Rembrandt: A Self-Portrait =

1954 film

- Produced by: Morrie Roizman
- Production company: Auerbach Film Enterprises
- Distributed by: Distributors Corporation of America
- Release date: 1954
- Country: United States
- Language: English

Rembrandt: A Self-Portrait is a 1954 American short documentary film about the artist Rembrandt produced by Morrie Roizman, a former editor for The March of Time. This film shows a series of Rembrandt's artwork, including painting and drawings spanning his entire life and being shown as related of events throughout his life are narrated.

Rembrandt: A Self-Portrait was nominated for an Academy Award for Best Documentary Short.
