= The Fight: Science Against Cancer =

1950 film

- Directed by: Morten Parker
- Produced by: Guy Glover
- Production companies: National Film Board of Canada; Association of American Medical Colleges (in association with)
- Distributed by: National Film Board of Canada (Canada); International Film Bureau (United States)
- Release date: 1950
- Running time: 21 minutes
- Countries: Canada; United States
- Language: English

The Fight: Science Against Cancer is a 1950 Canadian-American short documentary film directed by Morten Parker. It was produced by the National Film Board of Canada for the Association of American Medical Colleges for the National Cancer Institute and the Department of National Health and Welfare, Canada. The Fight is a shortened version of The Challenge: Science Against Cancer. It covers the topic of cancer using animation.

It was nominated for an Academy Award for Best Documentary Short.
