= Jack Lawrence (songwriter) =

American writer and composer (1912-2009)

- Born: Jacob Louis Schwartz; April 7, 1912; Brooklyn, New York
- Died: March 16, 2009 (aged 96); Redding, Connecticut
- Occupations: Songwriter and composer
- Years active: 1928–1994
- Partners: Walter David Myden (c. 1945 to Myden's death in 1975); Rick Debnam (c. 1979 to Lawrence's death in 2009)

Jack Lawrence (born Jacob Louis Schwartz; April 7, 1912 – March 16, 2009) was an American songwriter. He was inducted into the Songwriters Hall of Fame in 1975.

== Life and career ==
Jack Lawrence was born in Brooklyn, New York to an Orthodox Jewish family of modest means as the third of four sons. His parents, Barney (Beryl) Schwartz and Fanny (Fruma) Goldman Schwartz, were first cousins who had run away from their home in Bila Tserkva, Ukraine to go to America in 1904.

Lawrence started writing songs as a child, but because of parental pressure after he graduated from Thomas Jefferson High School, he enrolled in the First Institute of Podiatry, where he received a D.P.M. degree in 1932. The same year, his first song was published and he immediately decided to make a career of songwriting rather than podiatry. That song, "Play, Fiddle, Play", won international fame and he became a member of ASCAP that year at age 20.

In the early 1940s, Lawrence and several fellow hitmakers formed a revue called "Songwriters on Parade", performing all across the Eastern seaboard on the Loew's movie-theater and Keith vaudeville circuits.

Lawrence joined the United States Maritime Service during World War II and wrote the official song of the Maritime Service and Merchant Marine, "Heave Ho! My Lads, Heave Ho!" as a lieutenant in 1943, while bandleader at Sheepshead Bay Maritime Service Training Station in New York.

One of Lawrence's first major songs after leaving the service was "Yes, My Darling Daughter", introduced by Dinah Shore on Eddie Cantor's radio program and covered by The Andrews Sisters in a ballad version in 1941 on Decca Records. The song was Shore's first record. His song "If I Didn't Care" introduced the world to The Ink Spots. And although Frank Sinatra was already a well-known big band singer, Lawrence's "All or Nothing at All" was Sinatra's first solo hit with the backing of Harry James' orchestra in 1939 (seven months after a swinging big band arrangement by James' orchestra with no vocals became a huge hit, and James' theme song thereafter). Also in 1939, Bing Crosby with The Andrews Sisters (their first of dozens of successful pairings on Decca Records) recorded a swing version of Lawrence's lyrics to the Italian standard "Ciribiribin" (composed by Dole/A. Pestalozza). Lawrence once said of his lyrics to "Ciribiribin" and of the Crosby/Andrews rendition: "I had a ball writing this lyric, giving it a Romeo-Juliet balcony setting. Among the many record covers the song had, the one I truly felt captured the fun of the lyric was the first teaming of The Andrews Sisters with Bing Crosby. Listening to them, it's obvious they're enjoying their performance."

In 1946, Lawrence published a song he had written during his tour of duty in World War II. It was released in February 1947 and eventually spent 2 weeks at No. 1. He had written it for the then-one-year-old daughter of his attorney, Lee Eastman: Linda Eastman, future first wife of Beatle Paul McCartney. The song was called "Linda".

Lawrence also wrote the lyrics for "Tenderly", Sarah Vaughan's first hit and Rosemary Clooney's trademark song (in collaboration with composer Walter Gross), as well as the English-language lyrics to Charles Trenet's La Mer" under the title "Beyond the Sea," which became Bobby Darin's signature song. Another French song for which Lawrence wrote English lyrics was "La Goualante de Pauvre Jean", becoming "The Poor People of Paris".

Together with Richard Myers, Lawrence wrote "Hold My Hand", which was featured in the film Susan Slept Here and nominated for the 1954 Academy Award for Best Song.

Lawrence wrote two Disney songs, "Never Smile at a Crocodile" with Frank Churchill's music, featured as an instrumental in the film Peter Pan, and "Once Upon a Dream" with Sammy Fain's music from Sleeping Beauty.

Jack Lawrence collaborated with composer Ray Hartley on "Dawning of Love", "Whispers in the Wind" (1958), and "Darling, He's Playing Our Song" (1959). Ray Hartley (1925-2014) was a world-class Australian pianist, composer, arranger and philanthropist who was resident pianist at many first-class Manhattan hotels. "Dawning of Love" was featured in Ray Hartley's first album titled after the first track, "The Trembling of a Leaf" (Johnny Green / Jack Lawrence), that also included Lawrence's songs "Sleepy Lagoon" and "With the Wind and the Rain in Your Hair". "Whispers in the Wind" was included in Ray Hartley's second album For Lovers.

== Work on Broadway ==
- Follow Thru (1929) – musical; actor for the role of "Country Club Boy"
- Courtin' Time (1951) – musical; co-composer and co-lyricist with Don Walker
- Ziegfeld Follies of 1957 (1957) – revue; featured lyricist for "Bring on the Girls" and "Music for Madame"
- Maybe Tuesday (1958) – play; co-producer
- I Had a Ball (1964) – musical; co-composer and co-lyricist
- Lena Horne: "The Lady and Her Music" (1981) – concert; co-producer
- Come Back to the 5 & Dime Jimmy Dean, Jimmy Dean (1982) – play; co-producer
- The Golden Age (1984) – play; owner of the Jack Lawrence Theatre (formerly the Playhouse Theatre)
- Quilters (1984) – musical; owner of the Jack Lawrence Theatre
- So Long on Lonely Street (1986) – play; owner of the Jack Lawrence Theatre

Lawrence also wrote the lyrics to "Sleepy Lagoon", a hit by The Platters. The music to "Sleepy Lagoon" was written by Eric Coates in 1940. It was originally a hit for Harry James and his Orchestra in the early 1940s.

== Personal life ==
Lawrence was a gay man and was open about his sexuality later in life. He was the longtime companion of Walter David Myden (birth surname Cohn or Cohen). Myden was born in Cooperstown, New York in 1915 to Jewish parents who had immigrated from the Russian Empire, much like Lawrence's family. He and Lawrence met while serving in the United States Merchant Marines during World War II. Myden was a psychologist and a social worker at a Los Angeles community council. His UCLA dissertation was published in 1957, on the personalities of creative types, such as composers.

In 1968, Lawrence and Myden made a sizable donation of 20th-century American art to the then-new American Pavilion of Art and Design at the Israel Museum in Jerusalem. The gift was noted in an interview with the couple in The New York Times that made clear that the two were a couple who lived together and were making the donation together, an unusual and brave admission for gay men in pre-Stonewall America.

Myden died suddenly of a heart attack on May 21, 1975, in Los Angeles. Lawrence wrote in his autobiography how surprised and touched he was that his Orthodox Jewish family, which had rarely acknowledged his homosexuality or the existence of their longtime partnership, was gracious and kind to him as he mourned Myden.

In 1979, Lawrence adopted Richard ("Rick") Debnam as his son and heir, since he could not legally marry Debnam.

== Death ==
Lawrence died on March 16, 2009, at age 96, after a fall at his home in Redding, Connecticut.
