= Richard Myers (songwriter) =

Richard Myers (1901–1977) was a songwriter. Together with Jack Lawrence he wrote "Hold My Hand," which was nominated for the 1954 Academy Award for Best Original Song.

== Songs ==
- "My Darling", song by with lyrics by Edward Heyman 1932
