= Robert Youngson =

American film producer (1917–1974)

- Born: November 27, 1917; Brooklyn, New York, U.S.
- Died: April 8, 1974 (aged 56); New York, New York, U.S.
- Occupations: Film producer; director; screenwriter
- Years active: 1948–1970

Robert Youngson (November 27, 1917 – April 8, 1974) was a film producer, director, and screenwriter, specializing in reviving antique silent films.

== Biography ==
Robert George Youngson, born in Brooklyn, New York, graduated from Harvard University with a master's degree in business administration. He entered the film business in 1941, writing newsreel scripts.

In 1948 Warner Bros. Pictures hired him to produce a series of short subjects about sports. Most of these were straight roundups of current sporting events, but in some of them Youngson indulged his fascination with antique newsreels of the 1920s, and included vintage sports footage in the new productions.

This led to Youngson writing and producing a long series of historical short subjects for Warners, two of which won him Academy Awards. Most of these films took an affectionate look back at the fads and lifestyles of the 1920s. Youngson's narration was nostalgic in tone, unlike the facetious commentaries that usually accompanied silent-film revivals like Gaslight Follies (1945) and Warners' compilations of Mack Sennett comedies. Youngson also produced a feature-length documentary for Warners, Fifty Years Before Your Eyes (1950).

Warners discontinued live-action short subjects in 1956 and released Youngson, forcing him to work as an independent producer. He assembled a full-length feature of silent-comedy highlights, The Golden Age of Comedy (1958). This was a triumphant success, earning rave reviews from national columnists and receiving network exposure on TV talk shows.

He followed this with When Comedy Was King (1960) and six more vintage-comedy anthologies, the last being released in 1970.

== Academy Awards and nominations ==
He was nominated six times for the Academy Award for Best Live Action Short Film (one reel).

Year	Film	Academy Award	Notes
1949	Spills and Chills	Nominated	Daredevil stunts of the teens and twenties.
1950	Blaze Busters	Nominated	Newsreels of epic fire scenes.
1951	The World of Kids	Winner	Children at play in the 1920s.
1954	This Mechanical Age	Winner	Oddly designed airplanes.
1955	Gadgets Galore	Nominated	History of the automobile.
1956	I Never Forget a Face	Nominated	Celebrities of the 1920s.

== Full list of short films ==
All produced by Warner Bros. and narrators included Dan Donaldson, Jackson Beck, Clem McCarthy, Dwight Weist, Ward Wilson and Jay Jackson. Walton C. Ament produced the earliest shorts. Those not part of a series were marketed as “varieties” and “novelties”.

- Football Magic (two reel “Classic of the Screen”) – September 4, 1948
- Roaring Wheels (Sports News Review) – October 2, 1948
- Ski Devils (Sports News Review) – December 4, 1948
- Swim Parade (Sports News Review) – February 5, 1949
- Batter Up (Sports News Review) – April 9, 1949
- They're Off (Sports News Review) – June 18, 1949
- Spills and Chills (Sports News Review) – August 13, 1949 (DVD release: It's a Great Feeling: TCM Doris Day Collection)
- Pigskin Passes (two reel “Classic of the Screen”) – September 23, 1949
- A-Speed on the Deep – December 24, 1949
- Shoot the Basket (two reel “Classic of the Screen”) – April 29, 1950
- A Cavalcade of Girls – August 12, 1950
- Blaze Busters – December 30, 1950
- Horsehide Heroes – March 10, 1951
- World of Kids – June 23, 1951
- Disaster Fighters – August 11, 1951
- Lighter than Air – October 20, 1951
- Animals Have All the Fun – April 19, 1952
- Daredevil Days – August 9, 1952
- Too Much Speed – January 3, 1953
- No Adults Allowed – April 11, 1953
- Head Over Heels – June 20, 1953
- Looking At Life (two reel “Classic of the Screen”) – July 18, 1953
- Say It with Spills – October 24, 1953
- Magic Movie Moments – December 26, 1953
- They Were Champions (two reel “Classic of the Screen”) – January 23, 1954
- I Remember When – March 19, 1954
- This Wonderful World (two reel “Classic of the Screen”) – March 27, 1954
- Thrills from the Past – May 8, 1954
- When Sports Were King – June 19, 1954
- This Was Yesterday (two reel “Classic of the Screen”) – July 31, 1954
- This Mechanical Age – August 28, 1954
- Camera Hunting (two reel “Classic of the Screen”) – November 20, 1954
- A Bit of the Best – December 25, 1954
- Those Exciting Days – March 12, 1955
- When the Talkies Were Young (two reel “Classic of the Screen”) – March 26, 1955 (DVD releases: The Jazz Singer & Lucky Me)
- Fire, Wind and Flood – April 30, 1955
- Some of the Greatest – June 18, 1955 (Excerpts from Don Juan (1926 film), with John Barrymore.)
- The Glory Around Us (two reel “Classic of the Screen”) – July 2, 1955
- Gadgets Galore – July 30, 1955 (DVD release: Pete Kelly's Blues)
- An Adventure to Remember – October 1, 1955
- It Happened to You (two reel “Classic of the Screen”) – December 31, 1955
- Faster and Faster – January 21, 1956
- The Picture Parade (two reel “Classic of the Screen”) – March 31, 1956
- I Never Forget a Face – April 28, 1956
- Through the Camera's Eyes (two reel “Classic of the Screen”) – August 11, 1956
- Animals and Kids – August 18, 1956

== Feature-film compilations ==
Youngson also produced the following feature-length compilations:

- Fifty Years Before Your Eyes (1950)
- The Golden Age of Comedy (1957)
- When Comedy Was King (1960)
- Days of Thrills and Laughter (1961)
- 30 Years of Fun (1963)
- M-G-M's Big Parade of Comedy (1964)
- Laurel and Hardy's Laughing 20's (1965)
- The Further Perils of Laurel and Hardy (1967)
- 4 Clowns (1970)

== Private life and death ==
He died at St. Vincent's Hospital in New York City on April 8, 1974, at age 56, survived by his wife Jeanne Keyes.

== See also ==
- List of short subjects by Hollywood studio#Warner Brothers
