= Dwight Weist =

Radio actor and announcer (1910–1991)

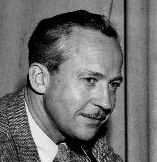
- Born: Dwight Weist, Jr. January 16, 1910; Palo Alto, California, U.S.
- Died: July 16, 1991 (aged 81); Block Island, Rhode Island, U.S.
- Education: Ohio Wesleyan University
- Occupations: Actor announcer
- Years active: 1938-1987
- Spouse(s): Elizabeth Maxwell (1935-?); Avery Hathaway (1956-?)

Dwight Weist, Jr. (January 16, 1910 - July 16, 1991) was an actor and announcer in the era of old-time radio.

== Early years ==
The son of Mr. and Mrs. Dwight W. Weist, he was born in Palo Alto, California, but was raised in Scranton, Pennsylvania. He attended Scranton's Central High School, where he participated in dramatics. He was a 1931 graduate of Ohio Wesleyan University, where he participated in debate, and he acted in the Cleveland Play House theater company.

== Radio ==
Weist debuted on radio in Columbus, Ohio, working as an announcer on WAIU while he was a college student. He also worked on WGBI in Scranton, relating instructions about playing bridge.

Weist was called "the man of 1,000 voices," primarily as a result of his work on The March of Time. His obituary in The New York Times explained, "Mr. Weist, who played Adolf Hitler and Franklin D. Roosevelt, among many others, received his nickname because of his ability to imitate a broad range of accents and ages." Weist even made an adjustment in 1935 after Hitler had surgery to create a milder, more soothing vocal tone. Some of Weist's friends watched as he listened to a speech by Hitler and immediately afterward spoke in the newer tone himself. When he was assigned roles of people with whose voices he was unfamiliar, he listened to them in newsreels and on radio to develop his impersonations.

His roles on radio programs included those shown in the table below.

Program	Role
The Adventures of the Thin Man	Announcer
The Aldrich Family	Announcer
Big Town	Narrator; Inspector Callahan
Cavalcade of America	Narrator
Forty-five Minutes From Hollywood	Impersonated leading film stars
Grand Slam	Announcer
Inner Sanctum Mystery	Announcer
Mr. District Attorney	District attorney
The Second Mrs. Burton	Stanley Burton
The Shadow	Police Commissioner Weston
Skippy	Announcer
So Big	Announcer on East Coast broadcasts Narrator on West Coast broadcasts
Stories America Loves	Announcer
We, the People	Master of ceremonies

Weist also wrote scripts for radio programs, at least two of which were produced: "The Death of Adolph Hitler on The Kate Smith Hour and "Evening Call", produced by the Radio Guild.

== Film and television ==
In the 1940s, Weist's voice was heard on Pathé newsreels in movie theaters. He also was heard in the film Zelig and was shown announcing the Pearl Harbor attack in Radio Days. He narrated the short films State Trooper, about the Connecticut State Police, and Here Come the Yanks, about the National War Fund.

He was the voice of the character Adso (Christian Slater) as an old man, in the 1986 movie "The Name of the Rose".

He also played a role in the 1986 erotic romantic drama film 9½ Weeks. His character was a quiet painter, free artist very far from art business and lost in the NY exhibition of his paintings. Élisabeth (Kim Basinger) tries desperatly to make a connection as she feels lost in her life and closer to him than to anybody else at that moment. Without a word, a lot is said in their eyes contacts and the pushing crowd around making intimacy impossible.

On television, Weist was the announcer on Search for Tomorrow and worked on Walter Cronkite's Sunday News Special and Guy Lombardo's Diamond Jubilee.

== Other professional activities ==
In 1956, Weist and Bob Barron began the Weist-Barron School to teach commercial acting in New York City—an institution that has evolved into the Weist-Barron School of Television, as well as Weist-Barron-Ryan Acting Workshops and Weist-Barron-Hill Acting School, with campuses in New York City, Los Angeles and Atlantic City. Weist taught there for 35 years.

== Commuting by air ==
When Weist worked in New York City, he and his family lived on the shore of Lake Tomahawk in Orange County, New York, and he traveled to and from work by plane. He bought his first aircraft, a Fairchild, in 1940, before he learned how to fly. After World War II began, he sold the Fairchild to the government for use as a training plane. Later he bought a Seabee seaplane (manufactured by Republic Aircraft), which he moored at a dock near the family's home. The plane's 105 mph cruising speed enabled him to reach the city in 30 minutes, rather than the 140 minutes that driving typically required.

== Personal life ==
In 1935, Weist married Elizabeth Maxwell, a registered nurse, in Manhattan. While at home, he often worked in his garden. He also had a workshop in New York City in which he worked on toys and other wooden products during time between radio programs. After they divorced, he married Avery Hathaway on April 25, 1956.

== Death ==
Weist died July 16, 1991, of a heart attack in Block Island, Rhode Island. He was 81. He was survived by three sisters, four sons, a daughter, and seven grandchildren.
