= List of mountains in Powell County, Montana =

There are at least 129 named mountains in Powell County, Montana.

- Alloy Mountain, 47°21′40″N 113°05′16″W, el. 7,365 feet (2,245 m)
- Antelope Hill, 46°42′40″N 112°41′04″W, el. 5,528 feet (1,685 m)
- Apex Mountain, 47°17′15″N 113°04′50″W, el. 7,667 feet (2,337 m)
- Arrastra Mountain, 47°04′16″N 112°49′33″W, el. 7,976 feet (2,431 m)
- Bailey Mountain, 46°41′17″N 112°54′55″W, el. 6,594 feet (2,010 m)
- Baldy, 46°19′06″N 112°59′25″W, el. 8,937 feet (2,724 m)
- Ballard Hill, 46°28′55″N 112°59′05″W, el. 6,375 feet (1,943 m)
- Bartlett Mountain, 47°30′04″N 113°20′33″W, el. 7,687 feet (2,343 m)
- Bison Mountain, 46°23′40″N 112°23′48″W, el. 7,976 feet (2,431 m)
- Black Mountain, 46°18′52″N 112°35′04″W, el. 7,979 feet (2,432 m)
- Black Mountain, 46°59′56″N 112°50′11″W, el. 7,457 feet (2,273 m)
- Black Mountain, 47°22′38″N 113°09′45″W, el. 8,127 feet (2,477 m)
- Blacktail Mountain, 46°59′42″N 113°16′18″W, el. 5,794 feet (1,766 m)
- Brown Sandstone Peak, 47°31′04″N 113°12′15″W, el. 7,526 feet (2,294 m)
- Bugle Mountain, 47°08′44″N 112°49′19″W, el. 8,150 feet (2,480 m)
- Bullet Nose Mountain, 47°27′21″N 113°19′08″W, el. 8,396 feet (2,559 m)
- Butcher Mountain, 47°28′03″N 113°15′52″W, el. 7,251 feet (2,210 m)
- Campbell Mountain, 46°43′44″N 113°03′33″W, el. 6,145 feet (1,873 m)
- Cardinal Peak, 47°22′50″N 113°22′05″W, el. 8,563 feet (2,610 m)
- Cayuse Mountain, 47°28′20″N 113°12′08″W, el. 5,354 feet (1,632 m)
- Chamberlain Mountain, 46°54′52″N 113°13′24″W, el. 6,844 feet (2,086 m)
- Charlotte Peak, 47°34′19″N 113°23′24″W, el. 8,008 feet (2,441 m)
- Cliff Mountain, 46°21′54″N 112°30′05″W, el. 8,369 feet (2,551 m)
- Conger Point, 47°12′07″N 113°05′09″W, el. 7,726 feet (2,355 m)
- Count Peak, 47°20′08″N 113°23′45″W, el. 8,658 feet (2,639 m)
- Crescent Mountain, 47°17′58″N 113°26′09″W, el. 8,602 feet (2,622 m)
- Crimson Peak, 47°18′06″N 113°19′36″W, el. 8,268 feet (2,520 m)
- Daly Peak, 47°05′30″N 112°51′22″W, el. 8,300 feet (2,500 m)
- Deer Lodge Mountain, 46°21′31″N 112°56′58″W, el. 9,741 feet (2,969 m)
- Devil Mountain, 46°44′54″N 112°54′03″W, el. 7,401 feet (2,256 m)
- Devine Peak, 47°15′07″N 113°22′11″W, el. 8,008 feet (2,441 m)
- Dunham Point, 47°10′19″N 113°13′45″W, el. 6,699 feet (2,042 m)
- Dunigan Mountain, 46°57′34″N 113°09′53″W, el. 6,007 feet (1,831 m)
- East Goat Mountain, 46°23′05″N 113°01′30″W, el. 9,117 feet (2,779 m)
- East Spread Mountain, 47°09′38″N 113°03′14″W, el. 7,818 feet (2,383 m)
- Echo Mountain, 47°06′17″N 112°52′46″W, el. 8,379 feet (2,554 m)
- Electric Peak, 46°20′31″N 112°29′52″W, el. 8,323 feet (2,537 m)
- Elevation Mountain, 46°51′05″N 113°15′36″W, el. 7,050 feet (2,150 m)
- Emerson Peak, 47°27′05″N 113°08′10″W, el. 6,693 feet (2,040 m)
- Esmeralda Hill, 46°41′15″N 112°25′50″W, el. 6,965 feet (2,123 m)
- Fault Peak, 47°33′25″N 113°11′18″W, el. 7,775 feet (2,370 m)
- Fenn Mountain, 47°13′02″N 113°07′28″W, el. 8,232 feet (2,509 m)
- Flame Peak, 47°31′02″N 113°23′29″W, el. 8,058 feet (2,456 m)
- Flatiron Mountain, 47°27′22″N 113°10′46″W, el. 6,394 feet (1,949 m)
- Foolhen Mountain, 47°18′27″N 113°08′27″W, el. 8,530 feet (2,600 m)
- Fossil Mountain, 47°25′37″N 113°14′11″W, el. 8,277 feet (2,523 m)
- Goat Mountain, 47°20′17″N 113°20′35″W, el. 8,816 feet (2,687 m)
- Gordon Mountain, 47°25′19″N 113°14′25″W, el. 8,350 feet (2,550 m)
- Grace Mountain, 47°21′13″N 113°06′57″W, el. 6,857 feet (2,090 m)
- Granite Mountain, 46°56′15″N 113°12′02″W, el. 6,893 feet (2,101 m)
- Gravely Mountain, 46°38′49″N 112°43′50″W, el. 6,778 feet (2,066 m)
- Green Mountain, 46°58′27″N 113°11′30″W, el. 5,610 feet (1,710 m)
- Gust Mountain, 47°20′45″N 113°12′47″W, el. 8,494 feet (2,589 m)
- Haystack Mountain, 47°35′39″N 113°08′36″W, el. 8,373 feet (2,552 m)
- Hoodoo Mountain, 46°47′21″N 112°54′04″W, el. 7,201 feet (2,195 m)
- Irish Mine Hill, 46°28′34″N 112°29′28″W, el. 6,726 feet (2,050 m)
- Iron Mountain, 47°06′00″N 112°52′17″W, el. 7,900 feet (2,400 m)
- Jericho Mountain, 46°28′55″N 112°19′04″W, el. 7,319 feet (2,231 m)
- Jones Mountain, 46°29′43″N 113°01′33″W, el. 6,775 feet (2,065 m)
- Jumbo Mountain (Powell County, Montana), 47°23′45″N 113°09′54″W, el. 8,225 feet (2,507 m)
- Kershaw Mountain, 46°57′23″N 112°51′52″W, el. 5,417 feet (1,651 m)
- Kid Mountain, 47°24′35″N 113°17′00″W, el. 7,959 feet (2,426 m)
- Lake Mountain, 47°10′05″N 112°58′04″W, el. 8,346 feet (2,544 m)
- Lena Peak, 47°29′48″N 113°27′50″W, el. 8,186 feet (2,495 m)
- Leota Peak, 47°17′54″N 113°21′34″W, el. 8,478 feet (2,584 m)
- Little Apex Mountain, 47°17′56″N 113°05′18″W, el. 7,549 feet (2,301 m)
- Little Baldy, 46°42′11″N 112°53′00″W, el. 7,008 feet (2,136 m)
- Little Red Hills, 47°06′08″N 113°08′25″W, el. 5,111 feet (1,558 m)
- Lone Tree Hill, 46°30′35″N 113°02′08″W, el. 6,263 feet (1,909 m)
- Lost Horse Mountain, 46°54′51″N 113°18′04″W, el. 6,263 feet (1,909 m)
- Luke Mountain, 46°36′52″N 112°43′00″W, el. 6,768 feet (2,063 m)
- Marcum Mountain, 46°58′05″N 112°56′39″W, el. 6,161 feet (1,878 m)
- Marshall Mountain, 47°17′21″N 113°24′12″W, el. 8,248 feet (2,514 m)
- Matt Mountain, 47°19′17″N 113°27′40″W, el. 8,005 feet (2,440 m)
- McCabe Mountain, 47°06′57″N 113°03′41″W, el. 7,395 feet (2,254 m)
- McCabe Point, 47°06′58″N 113°03′42″W, el. 7,447 feet (2,270 m)
- Mineral Hill, 47°08′29″N 112°54′47″W, el. 8,248 feet (2,514 m)
- Mineral Hill (Montana) 2, 46°56′53″N 112°56′33″W, el. 5,545 feet (1,690 m)
- Monahan Mountain, 47°16′10″N 113°09′07″W, el. 8,133 feet (2,479 m)
- Monture Hill, 47°02′04″N 113°11′52″W, el. 4,613 feet (1,406 m)
- Monture Mountain, 47°14′18″N 113°17′45″W, el. 8,127 feet (2,477 m)
- Morrell Mountain, 47°12′18″N 113°21′20″W, el. 8,113 feet (2,473 m)
- Moser Mountain, 47°19′26″N 113°10′38″W, el. 8,438 feet (2,572 m)
- Mount Powell, 46°21′01″N 112°58′47″W, el. 10,105 feet (3,080 m)
- Negro Mountain, 46°28′45″N 112°24′45″W, el. 7,057 feet (2,151 m)
- Nevada Mountain, 46°46′17″N 112°32′41″W, el. 8,284 feet (2,525 m)
- Nome Point, 47°12′13″N 113°15′13″W, el. 7,693 feet (2,345 m)
- North Chimney Peak, 46°43′10″N 112°58′32″W, el. 6,480 feet (1,980 m)
- North Chimney Peak, 46°43′11″N 112°58′34″W, el. 6,437 feet (1,962 m)
- O'Donnell Mountain, 46°16′02″N 112°38′27″W, el. 6,808 feet (2,075 m)
- Ogden Mountain, 46°51′55″N 112°49′01″W, el. 7,310 feet (2,230 m)
- O'Keefe Mountain, 46°26′05″N 112°20′03″W, el. 7,533 feet (2,296 m)
- Old Baldy Mountain, 46°42′37″N 112°52′21″W, el. 7,438 feet (2,267 m)
- Omar Mountain, 47°13′24″N 113°05′54″W, el. 8,484 feet (2,586 m)
- Ovando Mountain, 47°05′41″N 113°02′24″W, el. 7,697 feet (2,346 m)
- Packrat Mountain, 47°31′03″N 113°14′29″W, el. 5,377 feet (1,639 m)
- Patrol Point, 47°31′05″N 113°26′35″W, el. 8,097 feet (2,468 m)
- Pikes Peak, 46°25′40″N 113°00′42″W, el. 9,285 feet (2,830 m)
- Pilot Peak, 47°25′53″N 113°13′16″W, el. 8,232 feet (2,509 m)
- Pinnacle Peak, 47°18′50″N 113°06′00″W, el. 7,723 feet (2,354 m)
- Puma Peak, 47°20′29″N 113°18′55″W, el. 8,537 feet (2,602 m)
- Pyramid Peak, 47°16′17″N 113°23′50″W, el. 8,297 feet (2,529 m)
- Railley Mountain, 47°19′13″N 113°15′53″W, el. 8,179 feet (2,493 m)
- Red Butte, 46°19′21″N 112°53′47″W, el. 6,132 feet (1,869 m)
- Saddle Mountain, 46°40′42″N 113°00′44″W, el. 7,011 feet (2,137 m)
- Scarface Peak, 47°32′01″N 113°21′50″W, el. 8,333 feet (2,540 m)
- Scintilla Mountain, 47°29′04″N 113°07′41″W, el. 8,218 feet (2,505 m)
- Shale Peak, 47°32′22″N 113°10′48″W, el. 8,094 feet (2,467 m)
- Shamrock Point, 47°24′51″N 113°27′26″W, el. 7,214 feet (2,199 m)
- Shaw Mountain, 47°27′04″N 113°28′00″W, el. 8,133 feet (2,479 m)
- South Chimney Peak, 46°42′43″N 112°58′15″W, el. 6,562 feet (2,000 m)
- South Chimney Peak, 46°42′45″N 112°58′17″W, el. 6,552 feet (1,997 m)
- Spire Mountain, 47°31′49″N 113°21′25″W, el. 7,772 feet (2,369 m)
- Spread Mountain, 47°10′01″N 113°04′34″W, el. 8,035 feet (2,449 m)
- Spud Point, 47°33′28″N 113°27′39″W, el. 7,930 feet (2,420 m)
- Sturgeon Mountain, 46°43′48″N 113°07′12″W, el. 6,197 feet (1,889 m)
- Sugarloaf Mountain, 46°22′15″N 112°31′31″W, el. 8,248 feet (2,514 m)
- Tillson Peak, 47°33′18″N 113°13′21″W, el. 7,369 feet (2,246 m)
- Tour Mountain, 47°19′21″N 113°07′45″W, el. 8,294 feet (2,528 m)
- Trap Mountain, 47°28′02″N 113°05′17″W, el. 8,136 feet (2,480 m)
- Trapper Mountain, 46°55′23″N 112°54′42″W, el. 5,935 feet (1,809 m)
- Treasure Mountain, 46°27′25″N 112°23′03″W, el. 7,369 feet (2,246 m)
- Trio Mountain, 47°26′39″N 113°25′08″W, el. 7,940 feet (2,420 m)
- Una Mountain, 47°27′03″N 113°20′58″W, el. 8,543 feet (2,604 m)
- White River Butte, 47°33′08″N 113°17′09″W, el. 5,613 feet (1,711 m)
- White Rocks Mountain, 46°37′45″N 112°45′08″W, el. 6,611 feet (2,015 m)
- Windy Rock, 46°42′20″N 112°50′11″W, el. 7,034 feet (2,144 m)
- Woodtick Mountain, 47°23′10″N 113°07′10″W, el. 7,762 feet (2,366 m)
- Youngs Mountain, 47°16′42″N 113°15′05″W, el. 8,415 feet (2,565 m)

== See also ==
- List of mountains in Montana
- List of mountain ranges in Montana
