= American Peak =

Mountain in Colorado, United States

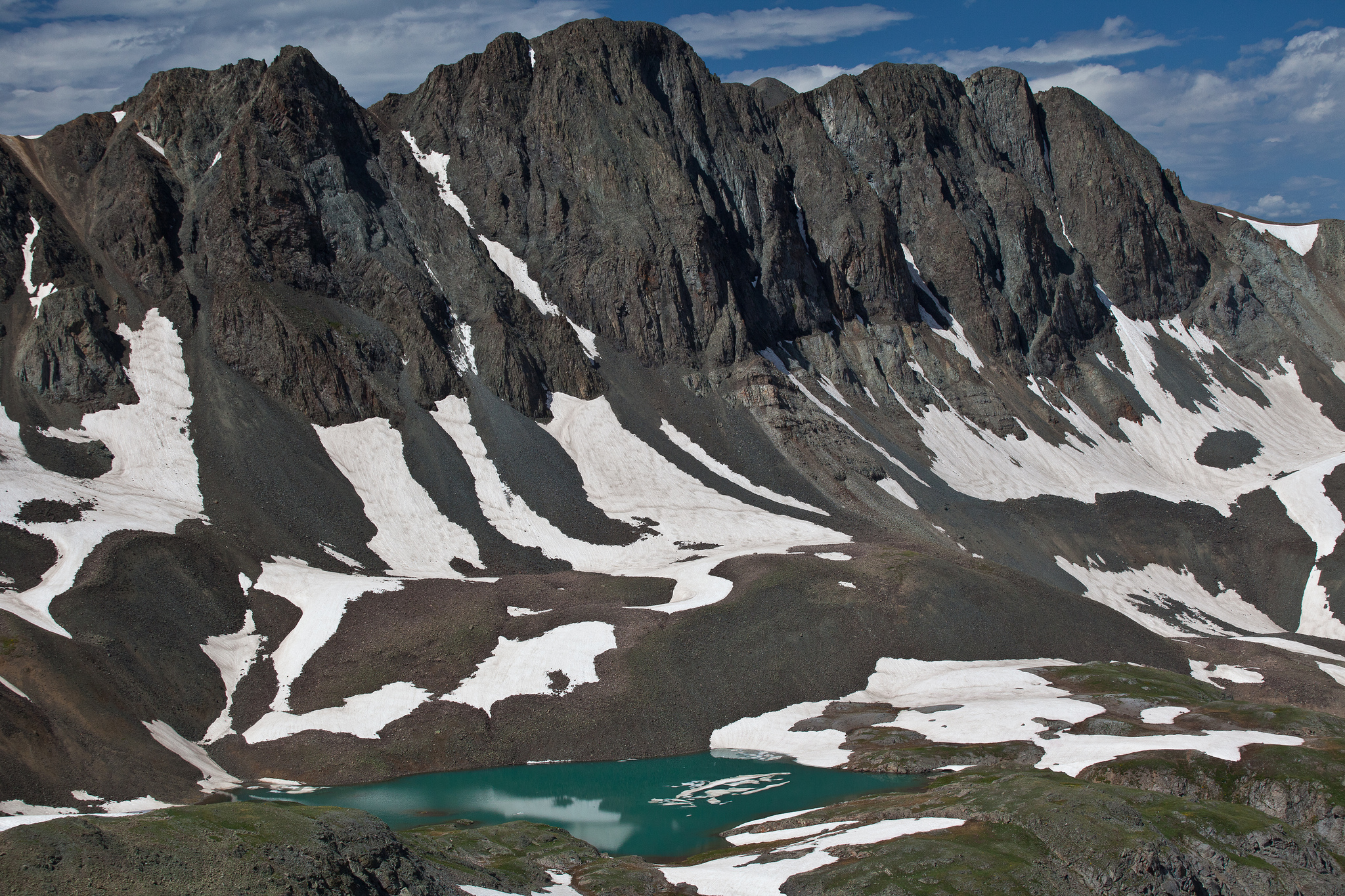
- North aspect, with Sloan Lake

Highest point
- Elevation: 13,806 ft (4,208 m)
- Prominence: 446 ft (136 m)
- Parent peak: Jones Mountain (13,866 ft)
- Isolation: 0.79 mi (1.27 km)
- Coordinates: 37°53′58″N 107°30′45″W

Geography
- Location within Colorado Location within the United States
- Location: Hinsdale County; Colorado, US
- Parent range: Rocky Mountains; San Juan Mountains
- Topo map: USGS Handies Peak

Climbing
- Easiest route: class 2 West ridge

American Peak is a 13,806-foot-elevation (4,208-meter) mountain summit located in Hinsdale County, of southwest Colorado, United States.

== Description ==
American Peak is situated 11 miles northeast of the community of Silverton, on land managed by the Bureau of Land Management. It is part of the San Juan Mountains which are a subset of the Rocky Mountains, and is situated four miles west of the Continental Divide. American Peak ranks as the 102nd-highest peak in Colorado, and topographic relief is significant as the south aspect rises 2,800 feet (850 meters) above Snare Creek in approximately 1.5 mile. Neighbors include Handies Peak one mile to the north-northeast, and Jones Mountain, 0.8 mile to the west-southwest. The mountain's toponym was officially adopted in 2005 by the United States Board on Geographic Names to recognize the American spirit and heritage, and the summit's proximity to American Basin.

== Climate ==
According to the Köppen climate classification system, American Peak is located in an alpine subarctic climate zone with cold, snowy winters, and cool to warm summers. Due to its altitude, it receives precipitation all year, as snow in winter and as thunderstorms in summer, with a dry period in late spring. Precipitation runoff from the mountain drains into tributaries of the Gunnison River.

== Gallery ==
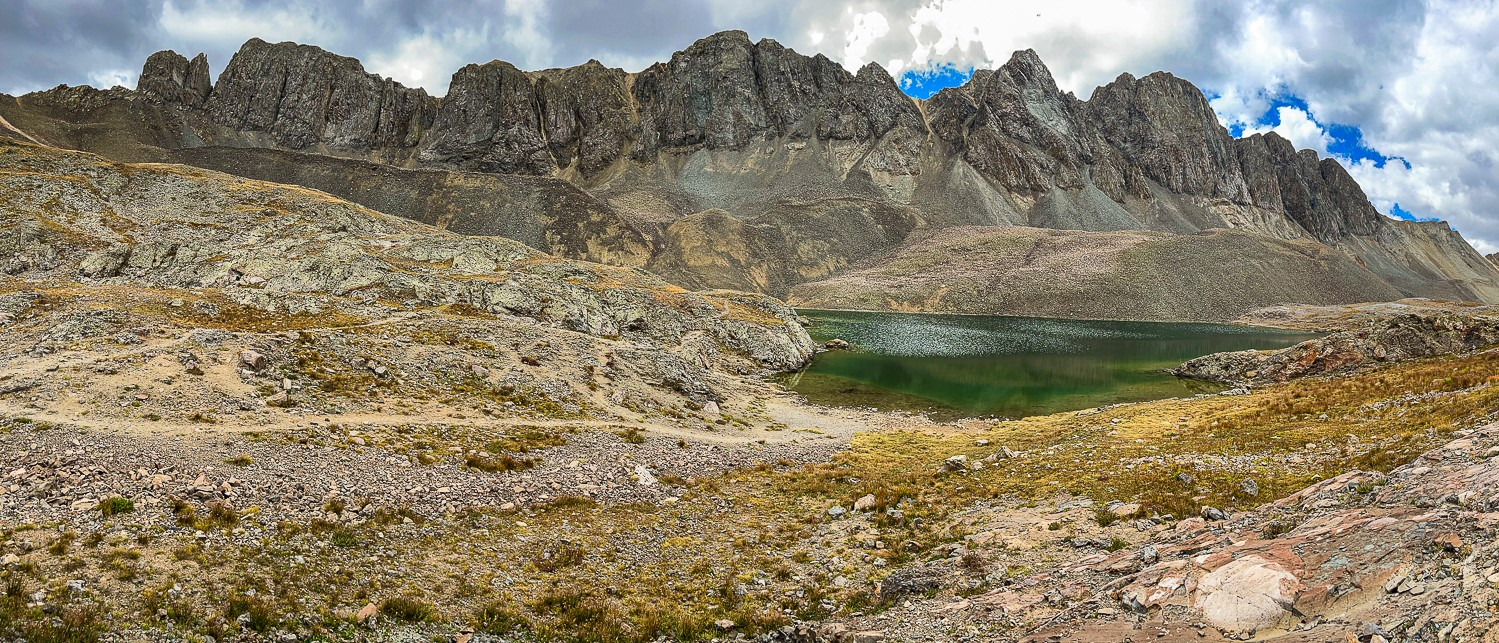
North aspect

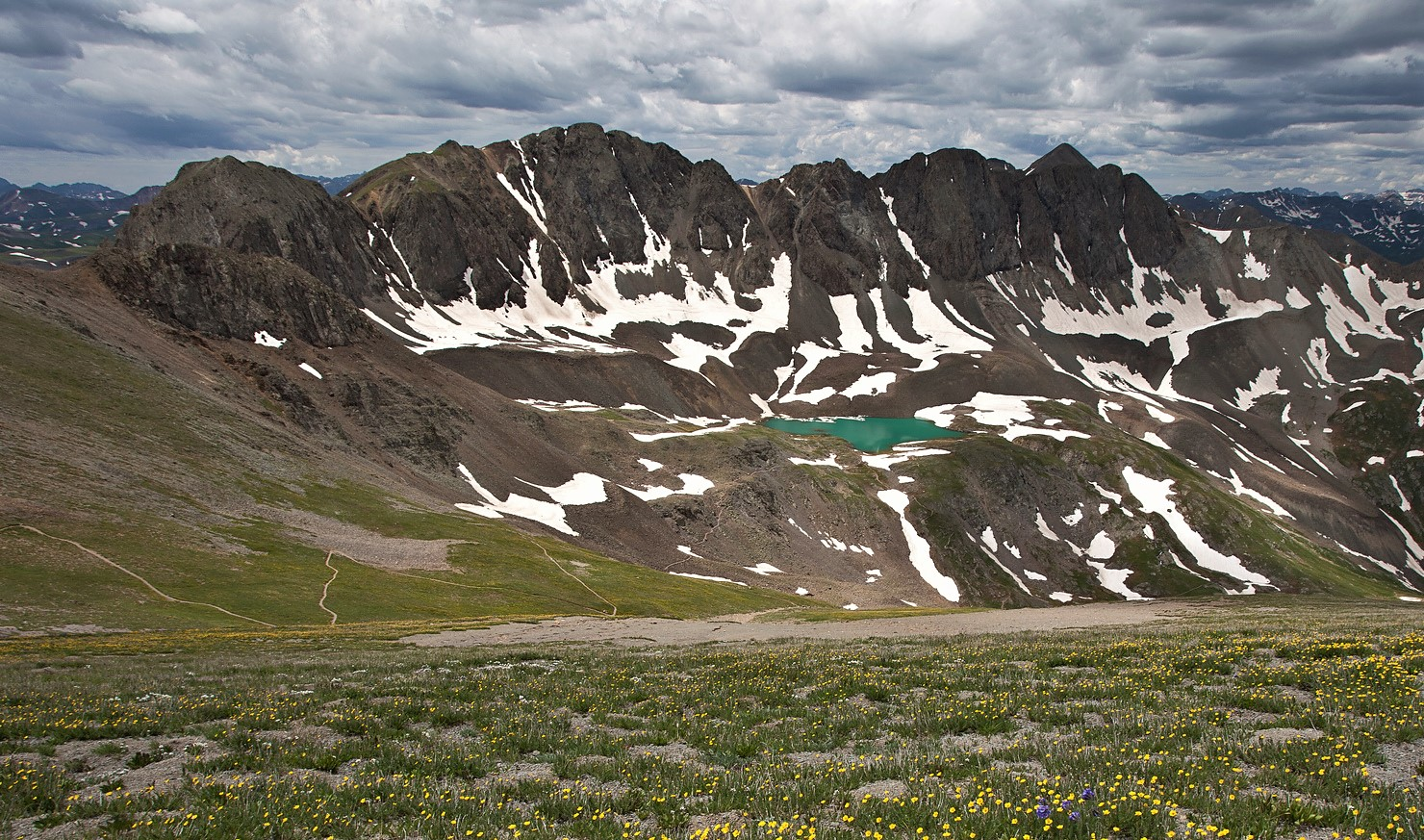
American Peak, north aspect, from slopes of Handies Peak

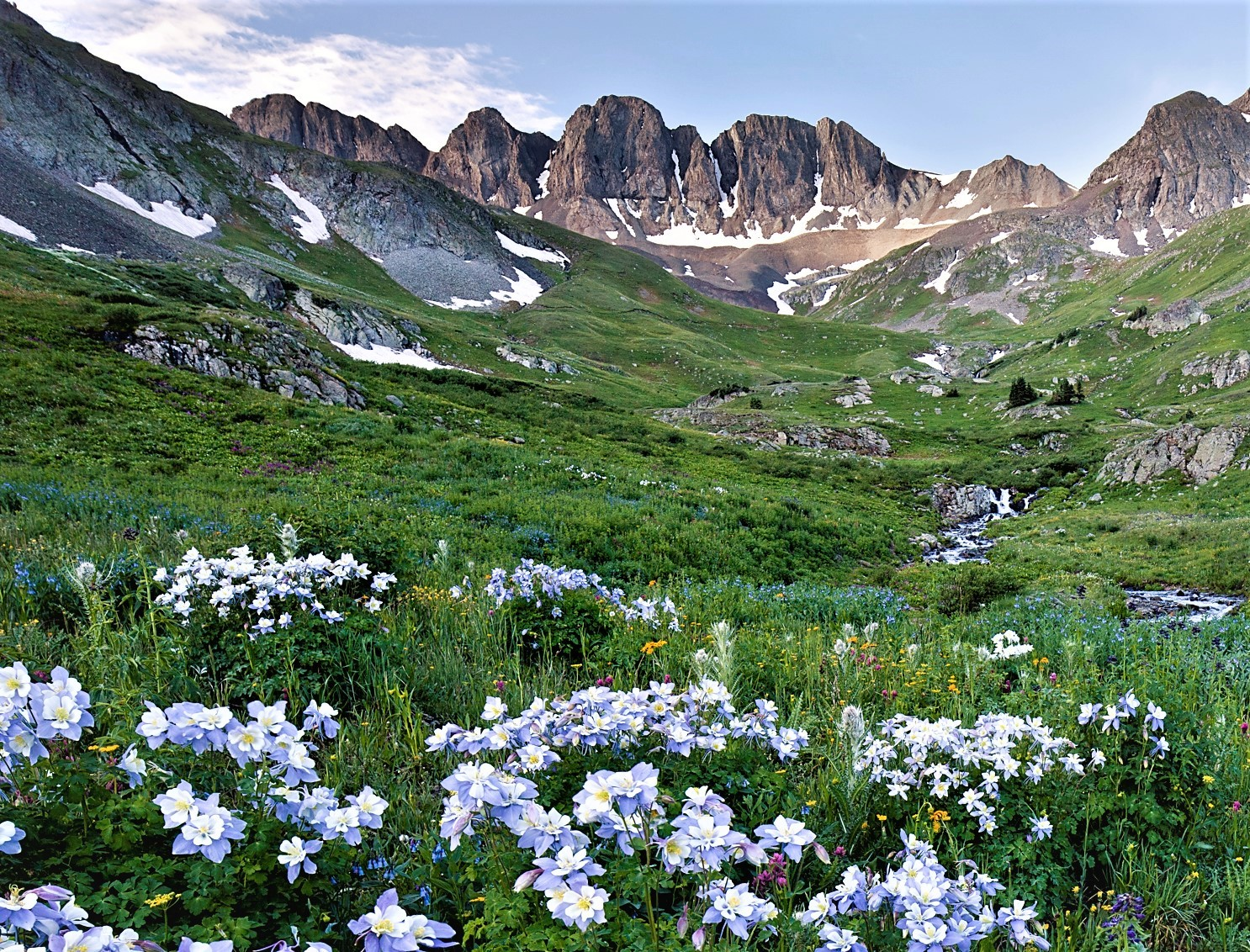
American Peak viewed from American Basin

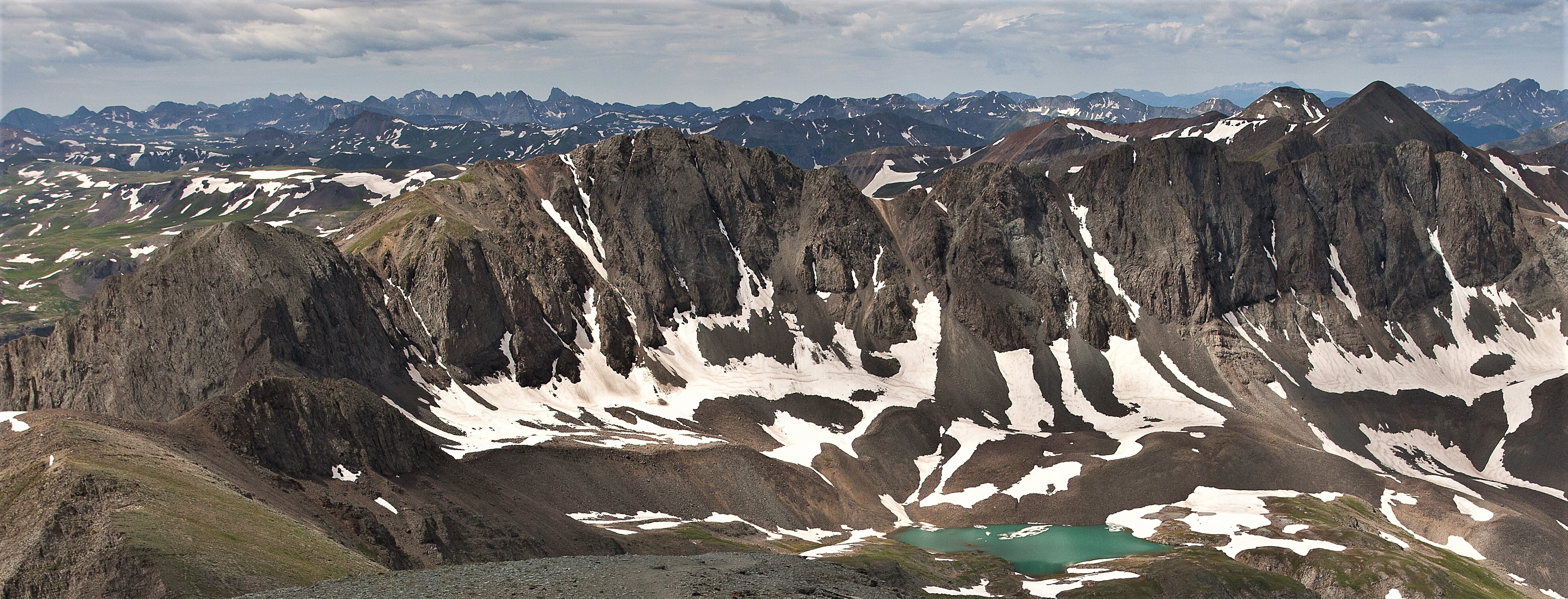
American Peak left of center, from top of Handies. (Jones Mtn upper right corner)

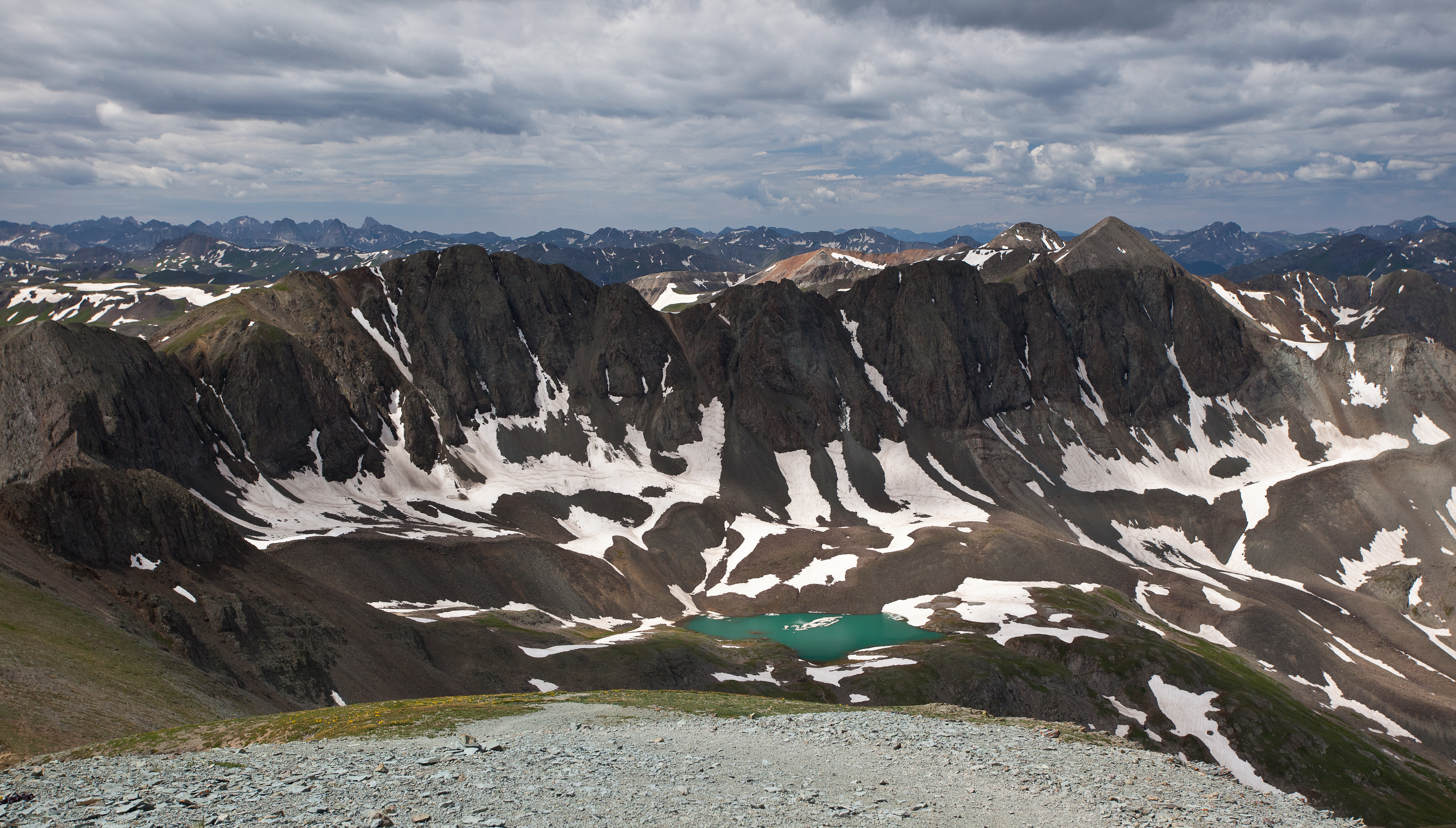
American Peak left of center, from top of Handies Peak. (Jones Mtn upper right)

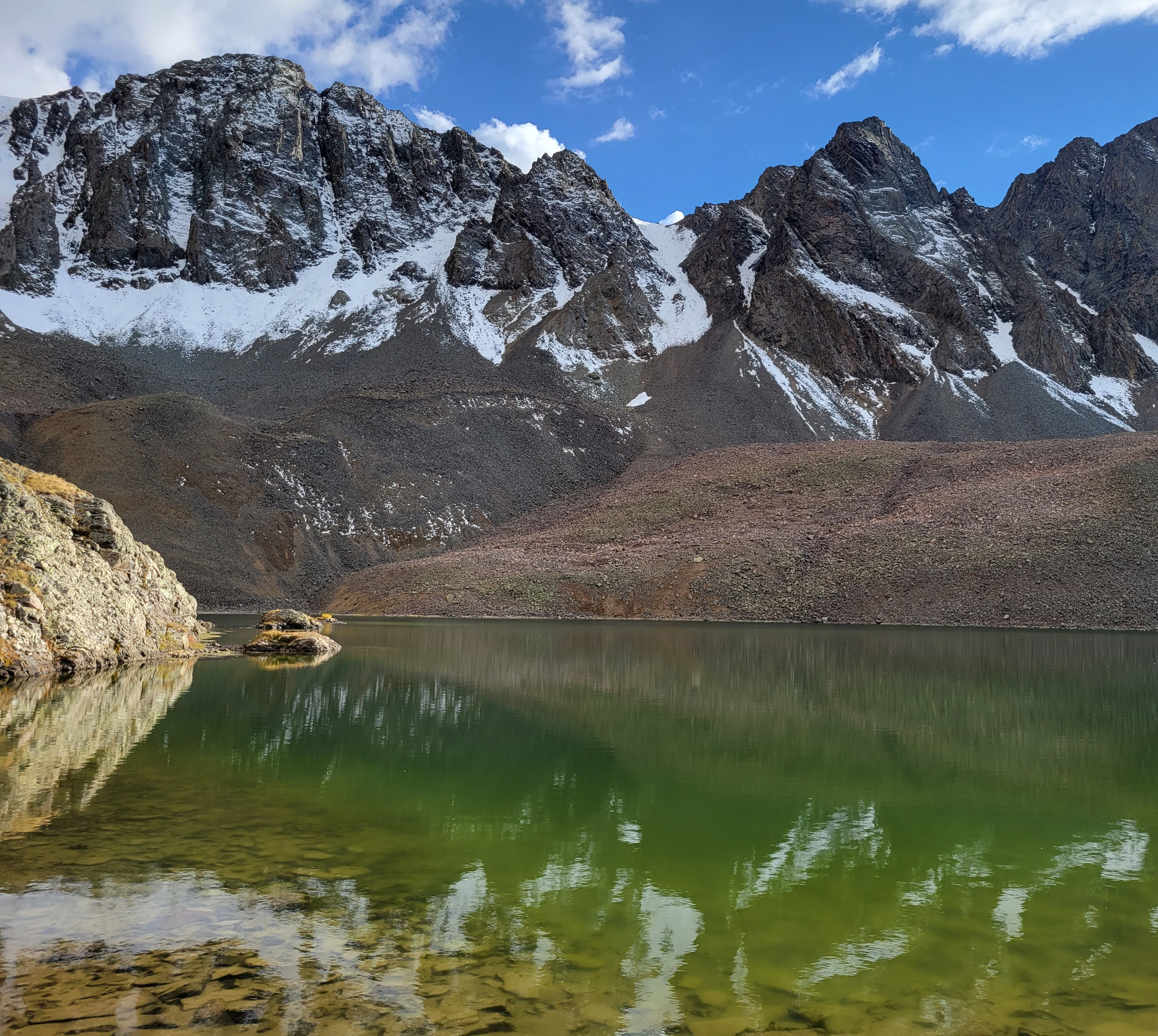
American Peak from Sloan Lake

== See also ==
- Mountains of Hinsdale County, Colorado
