= Jumbo Mountain (Powell County, Montana) =

Mountain in Montana, United States

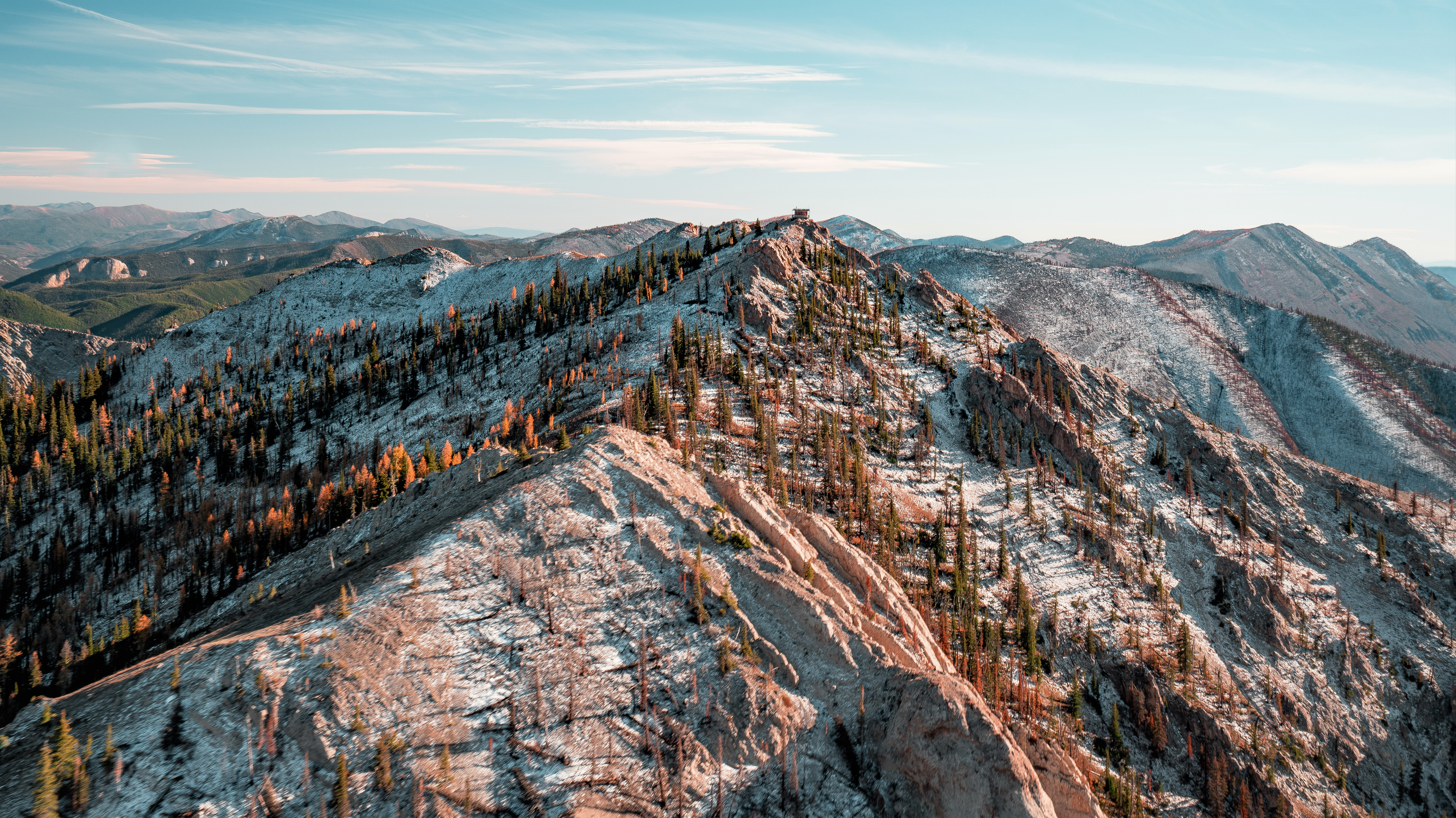
- Aerial view

Highest point
- Elevation: 8,284 ft (2,525 m)
- Prominence: 1,324 ft (404 m)
- Parent peak: Gordon Mountain (8,369 ft)
- Isolation: 3.96 mi (6.37 km)
- Coordinates: 47°23′45″N 113°09′54″W

Geography
- Location within Montana Location within the United States
- Location: Powell County, Montana, U.S.
- Parent range: Rocky Mountains; Swan Range
- Topo map: USGS Pilot Peak

Climbing
- Easiest route: trail

Jumbo Mountain is an 8,284-foot (2,525-metre) mountain summit located in Powell County of the U.S. state of Montana.

== Description ==
Jumbo Mountain is located in the Swan Range, which is a subset of the Rocky Mountains. It is situated in the Bob Marshall Wilderness, on land managed by Flathead National Forest. Precipitation runoff from the mountain drains into headwaters of the South Fork Flathead River. Topographic relief is significant as the west aspect rises 3,400 feet (1,000 meters) above Youngs Creek in 1.5 mile, and the south aspect rises 2,000 feet (610 meters) above Jumbo Creek in one-half mile. The active fire lookout at the top was built in 1957, having replaced a cabin originally built in 1937.

== Climate ==
Based on the Köppen climate classification, Jumbo Mountain is located in a subarctic climate zone characterized by long, usually very cold winters, and short, cool to mild summers. Winter temperatures can drop below −10 °F with wind chill factors below −30 °F.

== Gallery ==
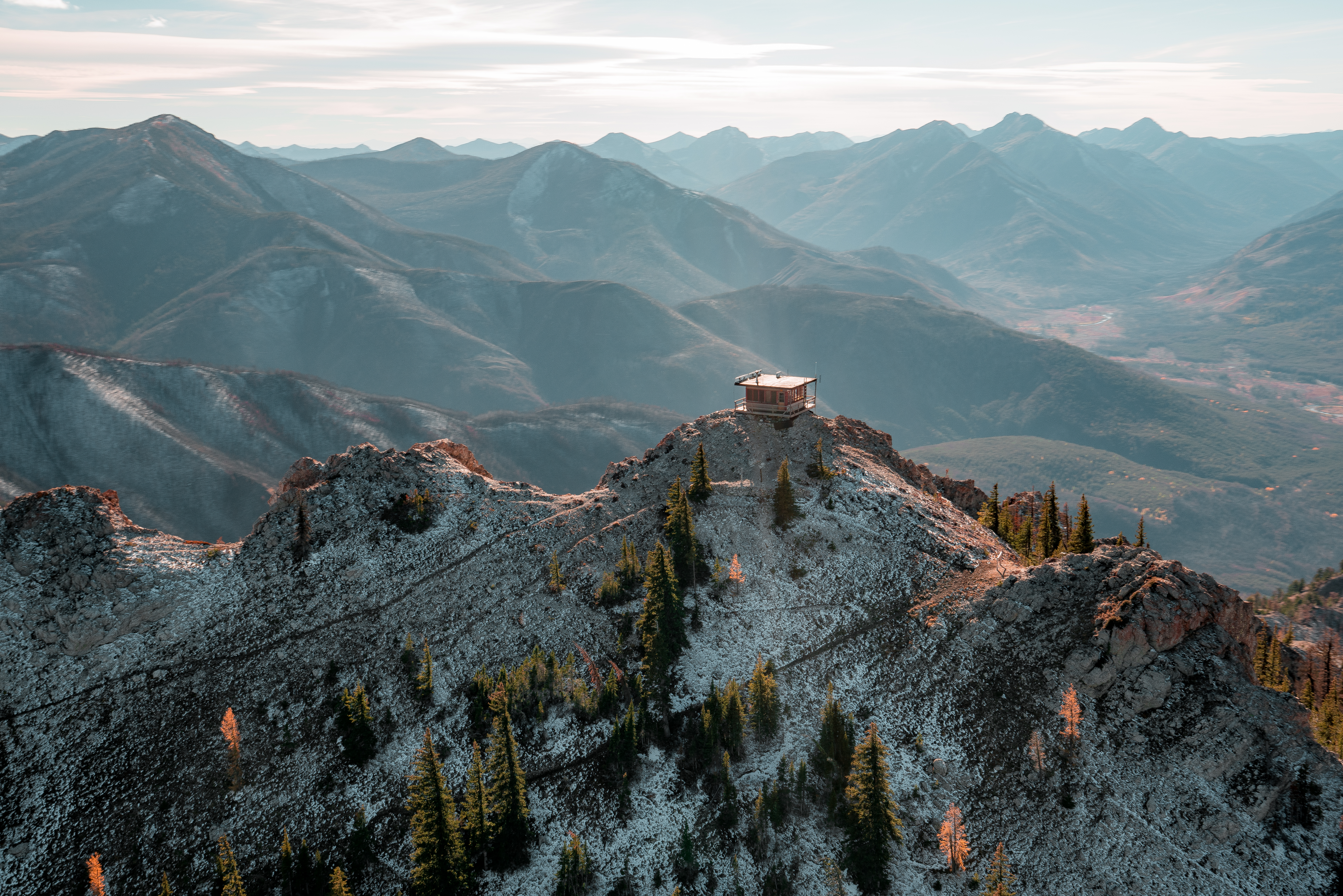

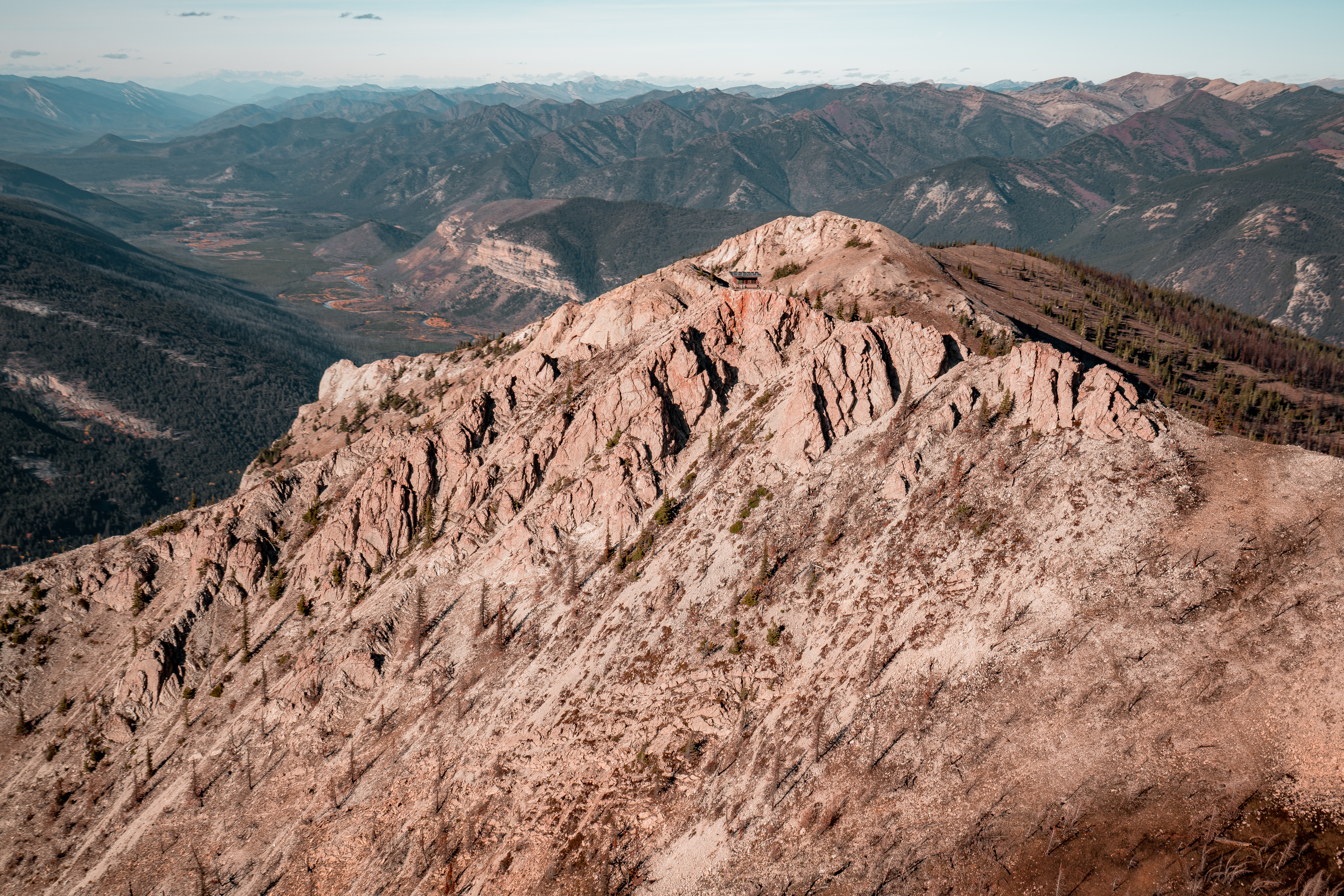

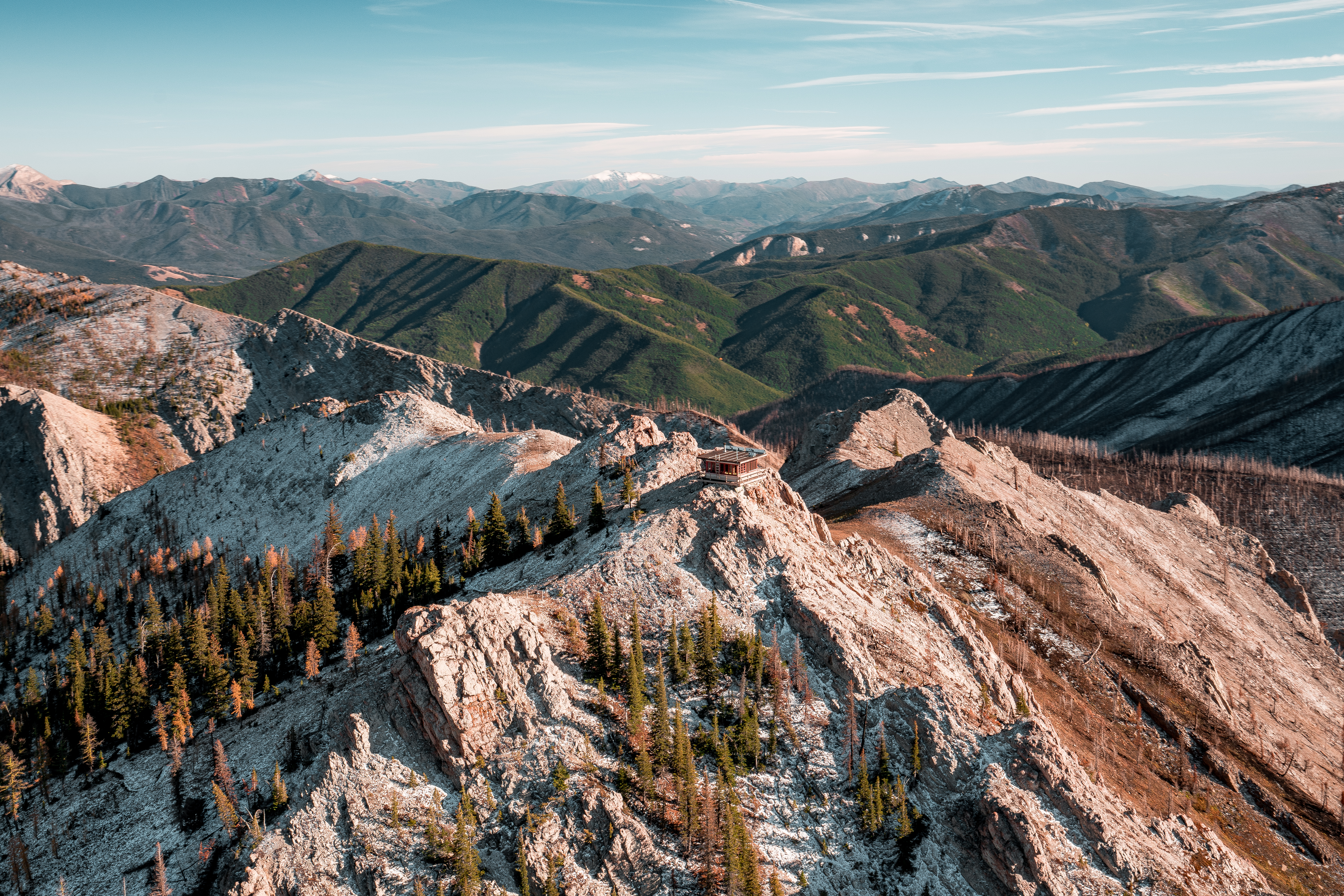

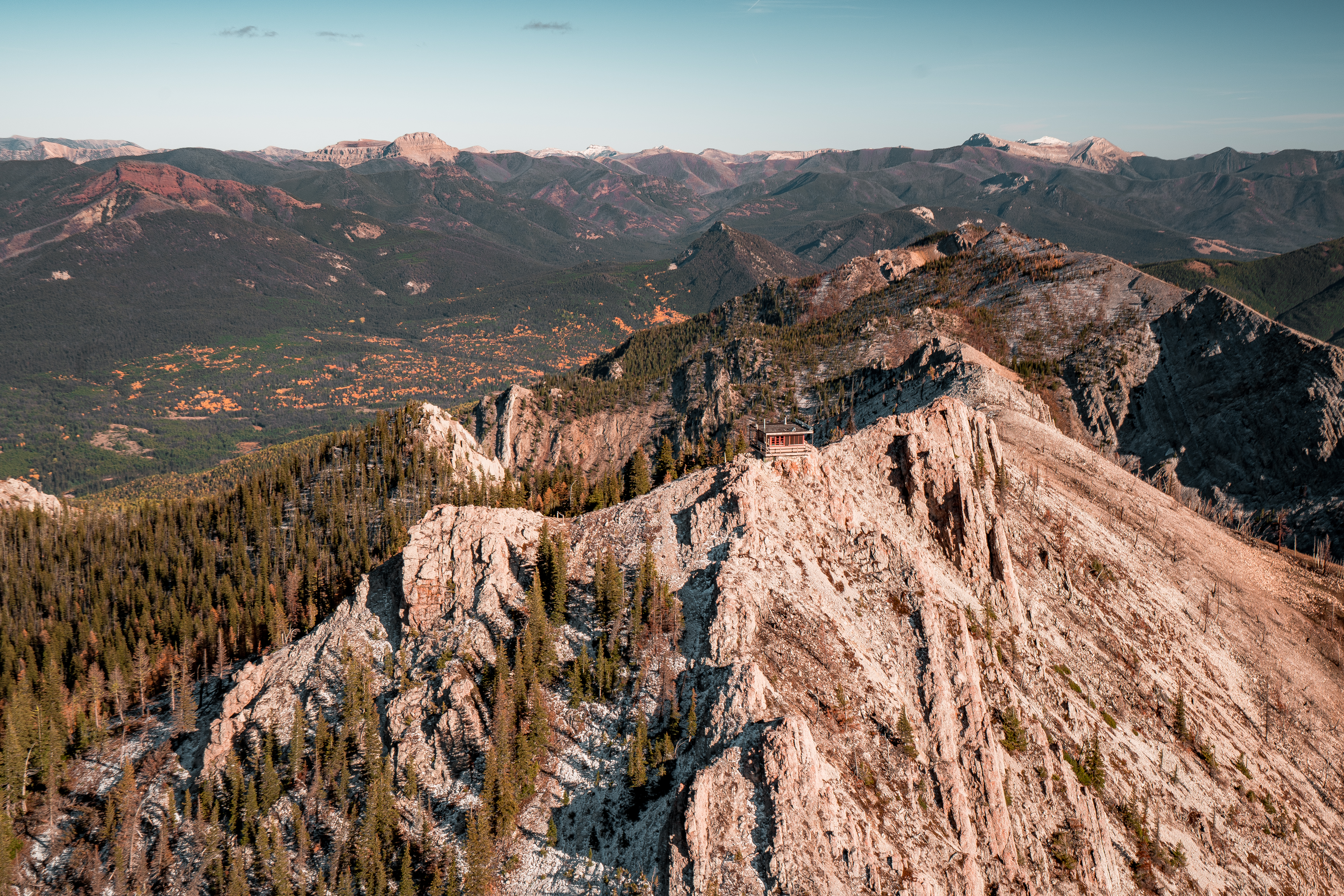

== See also ==
- Geology of the Rocky Mountains
