= Trap Mountain =

Mountain in Texas, United States

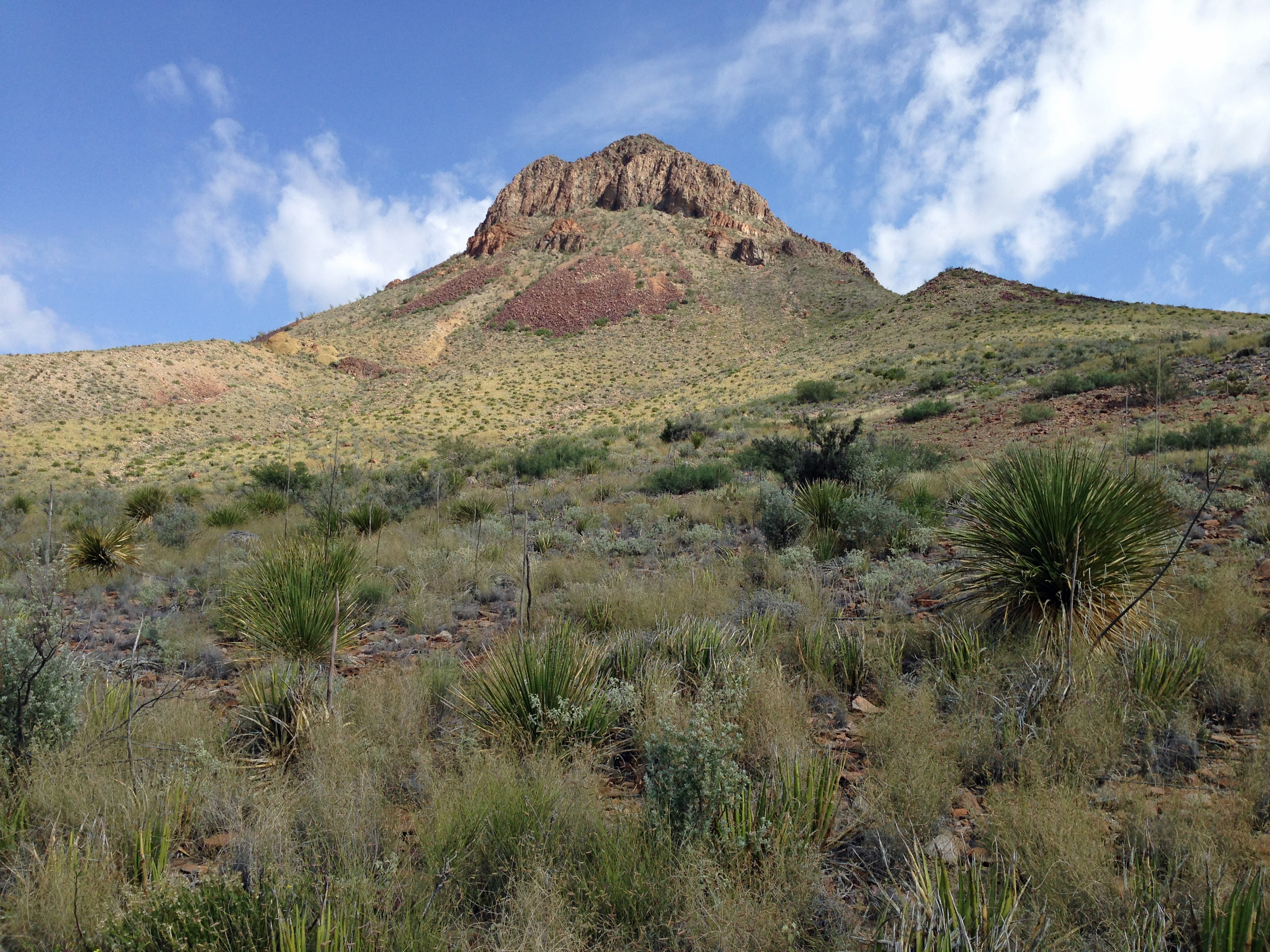
- Southwest aspect

Highest point
- Elevation: 4,122 ft (1,256 m)
- Prominence: 1,102 ft (336 m)
- Parent peak: Goat Mountain
- Isolation: 1.70 mi (2.74 km)
- Coordinates: 29°10′19″N 103°25′40″W

Naming
- Etymology: Trap rock

Geography
- Location within Texas Location within the United States
- Country: United States
- State: Texas
- County: Brewster
- Protected area: Big Bend National Park
- Parent range: Chisos Mountains
- Topo map: USGS Cerro Castellan

Geology
- Rock age: Oligocene
- Rock type: Igneous rock (Rhyolite)

Climbing
- Easiest route: class 2+

Trap Mountain is a 4,122-foot-elevation (1,256-meter) summit in Brewster County, Texas, United States.

== Description ==
Trap Mountain is part of the Chisos Mountains where it is set in the Chihuahuan Desert and Big Bend National Park. The mountain is composed chiefly of Burro Mesa Rhyolite (volcanic rock) which formed 29 million years ago during the Oligocene period. Based on the Köppen climate classification, the mountain is located in a hot arid climate zone with hot summers and mild winters. This climate supports plants on the slopes such as creosote bush, ocotillo, lechuguilla and yucca. Any scant precipitation runoff from the peak's slopes drains to the Rio Grande which is six miles to the southwest. Topographic relief is significant as the summit rises 1,300 feet (396 m) above Ross Maxwell Scenic Drive in one-half mile (0.8 km). The mountain's toponym has been officially adopted by the United States Board on Geographic Names, and has been listed in publications since at least 1914. The mountain's name refers to trap rock, which is any dark-colored, fine-grained, non-granitic intrusive or extrusive igneous rock. There are several large areas of dark rock on the west slope of the mountain visible from the Mule Ears Overlook below Trap Mountain.

== See also ==
- List of mountain peaks of Texas
- Geography of Texas

== Gallery ==
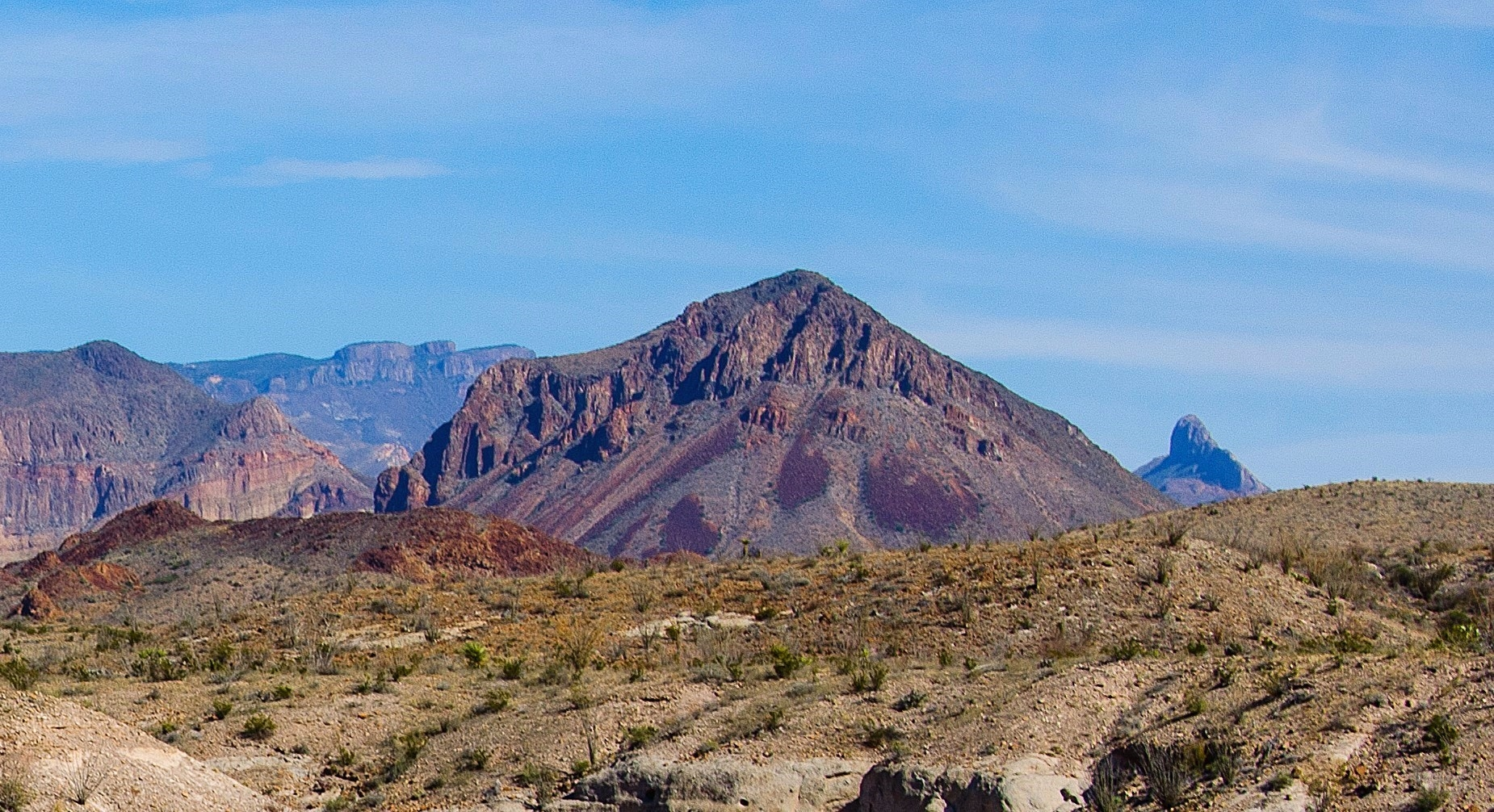
West-southwest aspect

Southwest aspect

Southwest aspect viewed from Mule Ears Overlook

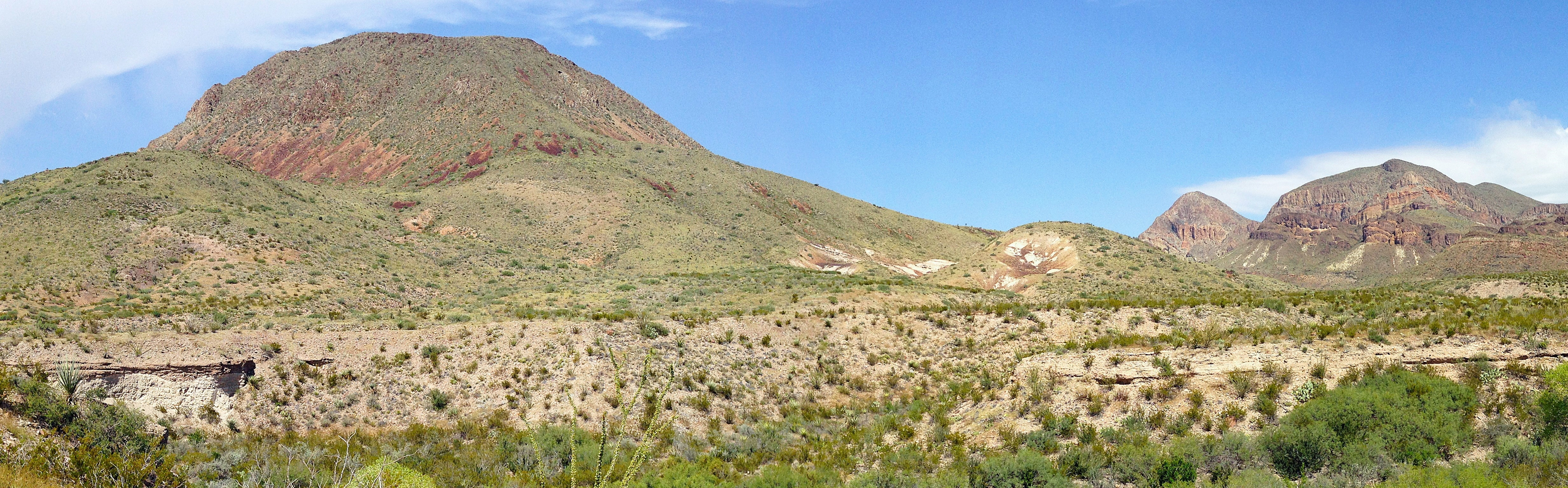
South aspect of Trap Mountain (left) and Goat Mountain (right)

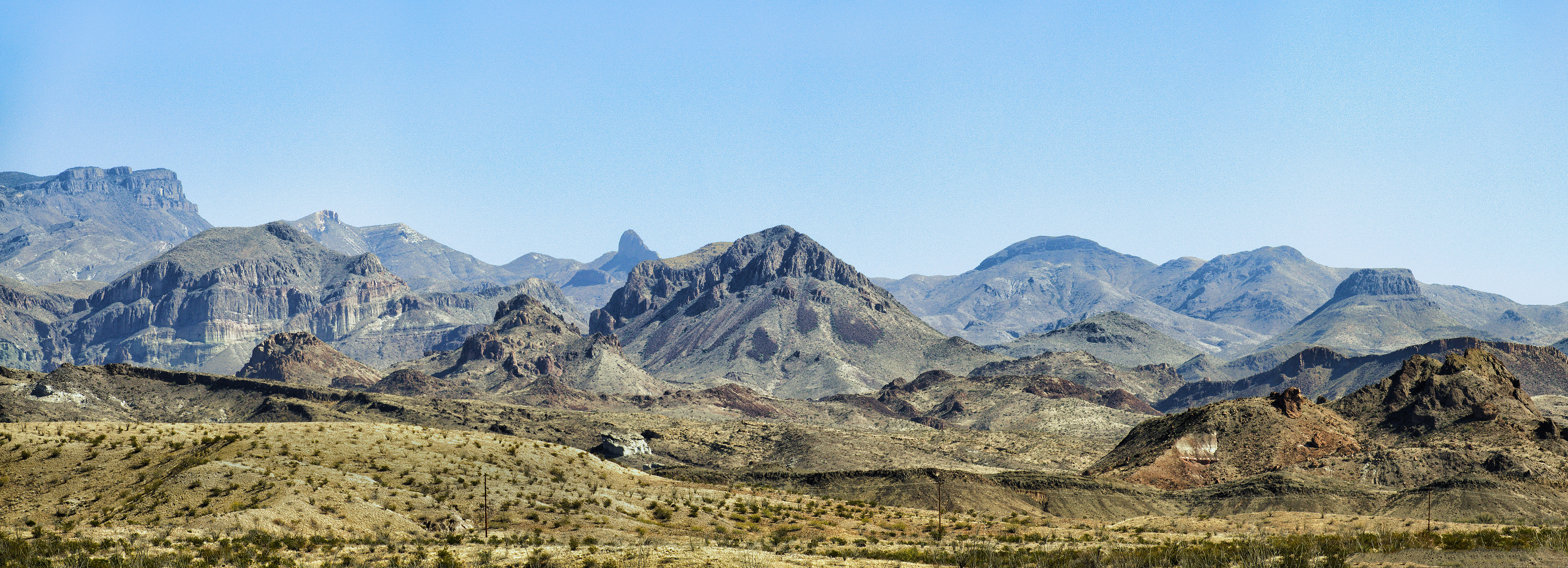
West aspect of Trap Mountain centered. (Goat Mountain to left)

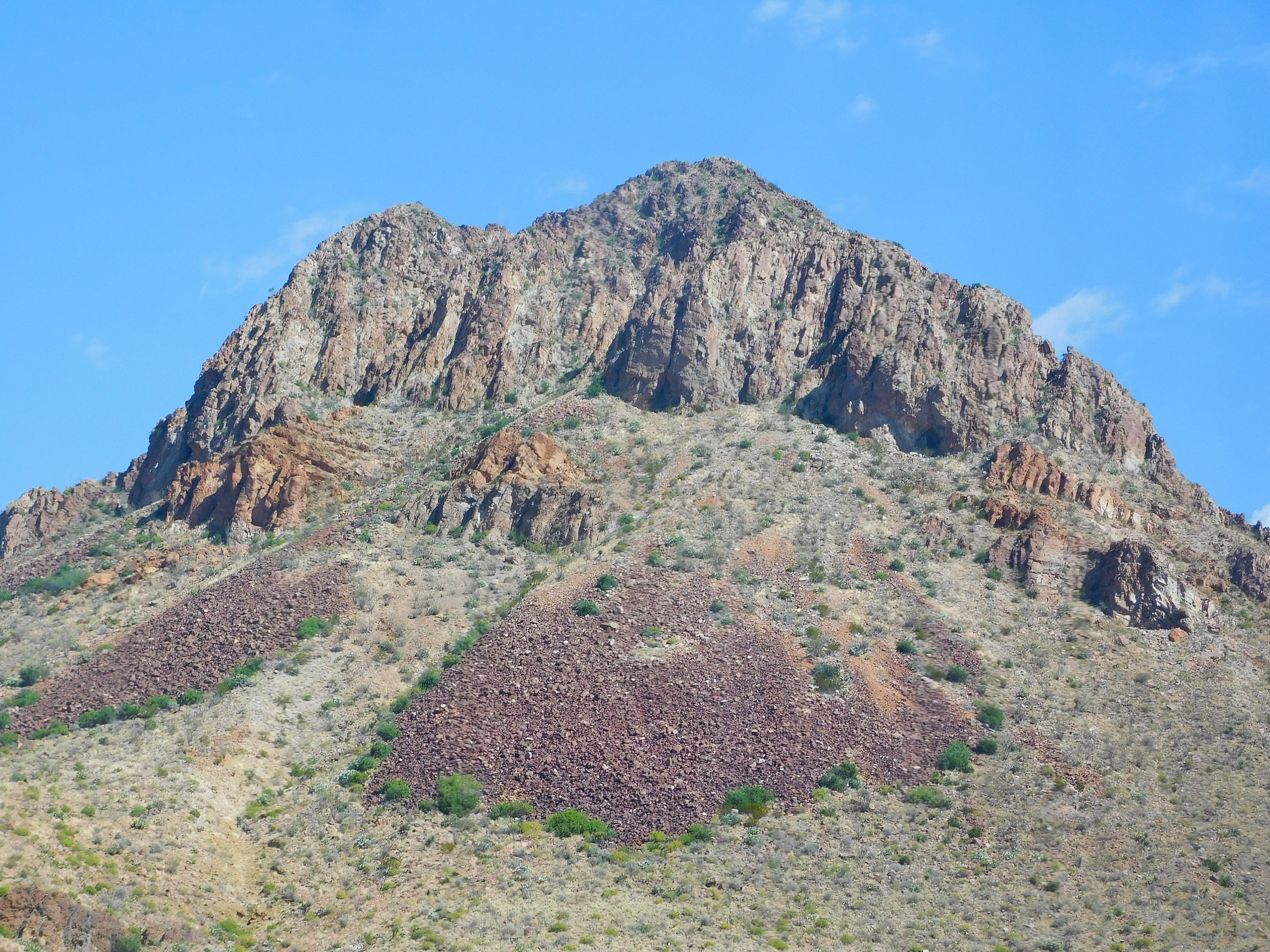
Summit detail, southwest aspect
