= Charlotte Peak =

Mountain in Montana, United States

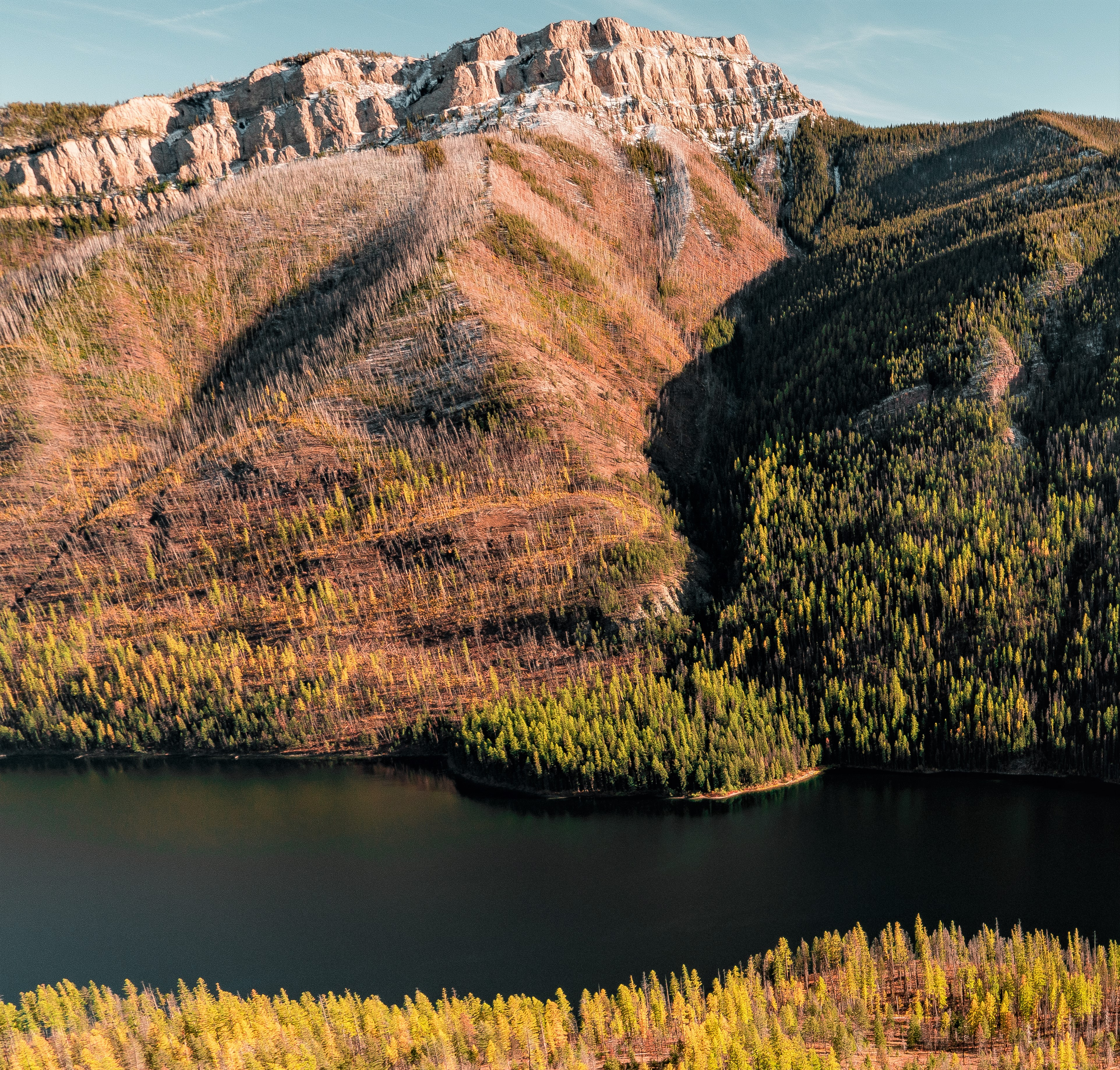
- Northwest aspect above Big Salmon Lake

Highest point
- Elevation: 8,065 ft (2,458 m)
- Prominence: 685 ft (209 m)
- Parent peak: Scarface Peak (8,346 ft)
- Isolation: 2.95 mi (4.75 km)
- Coordinates: 47°34′20″N 113°23′24″W

Geography
- Location within Montana Location within the United States
- Location: Powell County, Montana, U.S.
- Parent range: Rocky Mountains; Swan Range
- Topo map: USGS Big Salmon Lake West

Charlotte Peak is an 8,065-foot (2,458-metre) mountain summit located in Powell County of the U.S. state of Montana.

== Description ==
Charlotte Peak is located in the Swan Range, a subset of the Rocky Mountains. It is situated in the Bob Marshall Wilderness, on land managed by Flathead National Forest. Precipitation runoff from the mountain drains to Big Salmon Lake and the South Fork Flathead River. Topographic relief is significant as the summit rises 3,750 feet (1,140 meters) above Big Salmon Lake in one mile.

== Climate ==
Based on the Köppen climate classification, Charlotte Peak is located in a subarctic climate zone characterized by long, usually very cold winters, and short, cool to mild summers. Winter temperatures can drop below −10 °F with wind chill factors below −30 °F.

== See also ==
- Geology of the Rocky Mountains
