= Jones Mountain =

Mountain in Colorado, United States

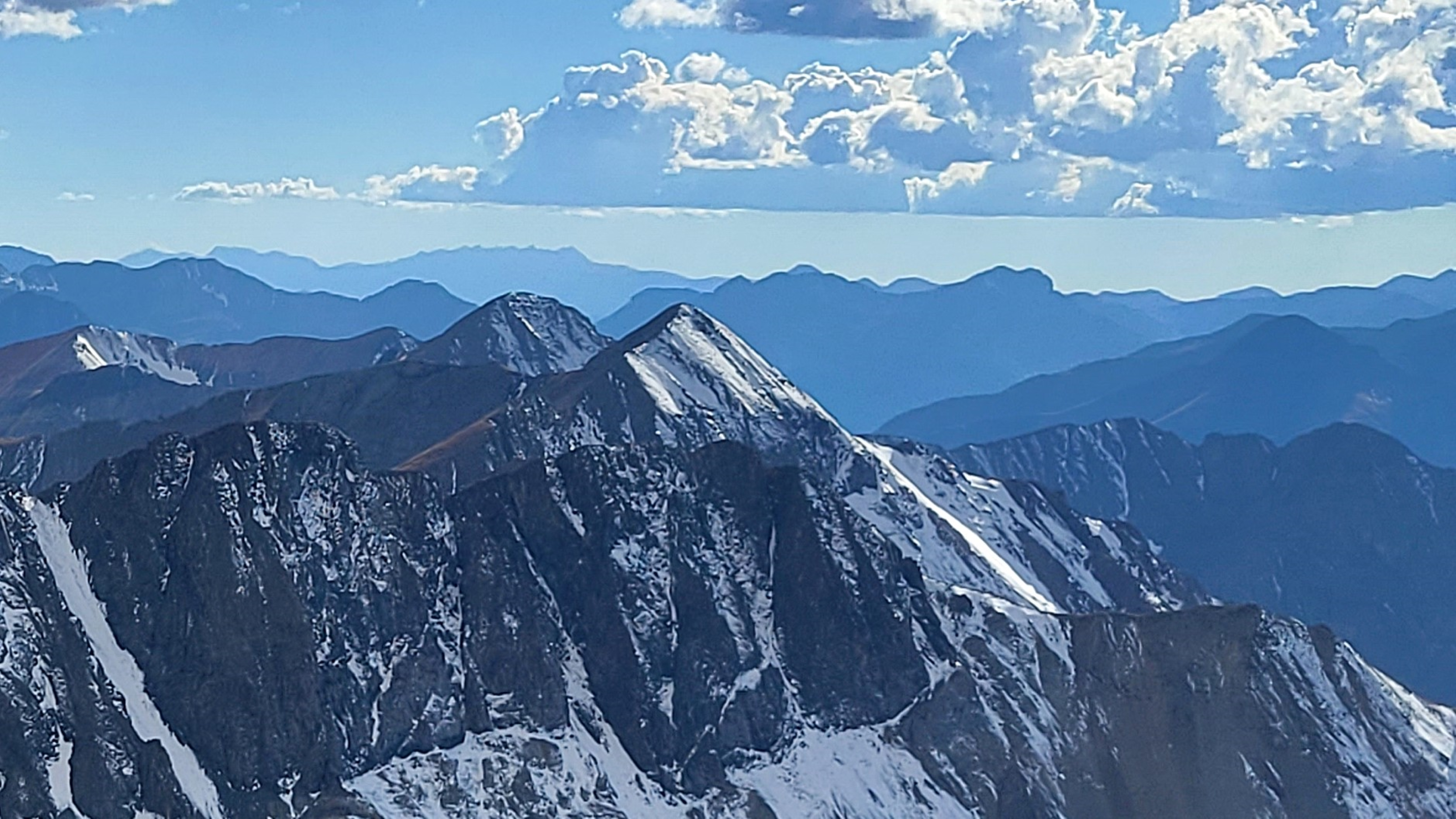
- Summit centered, northeast aspect

Highest point
- Elevation: 13,866 ft (4,226 m)
- Prominence: 500 ft (152 m)
- Parent peak: Handies Peak
- Isolation: 1.66 mi (2.67 km)
- Coordinates: 37°53′47″N 107°31′35″W

Geography
- Location within Colorado
- Location: Hinsdale and San Juan counties, Colorado, United States
- Parent range: San Juan Mountains
- Topo map(s): USGS 7.5' topographic map Handies Peak, Colorado

Jones Mountain is a high mountain summit in the San Juan Mountains range of the Rocky Mountains of North America. The 13,866-foot (4,226 m) thirteener is located 9.6 miles (15.4 km) northeast by east (bearing 52°) of the Town of Silverton, Colorado, United States, on the Continental Divide between Hinsdale and San Juan counties.

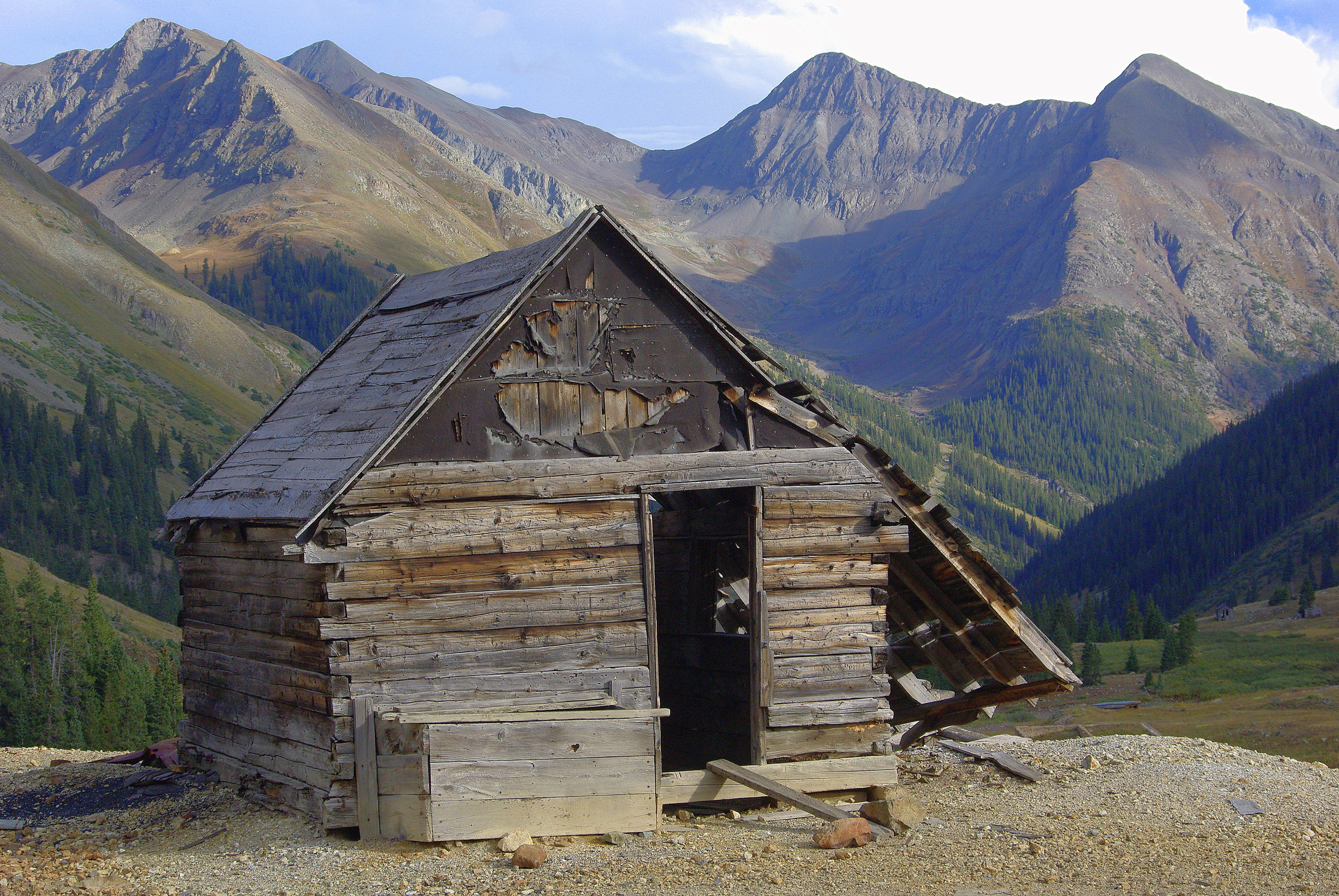
Jones Mountain to left in back. Niagara Peak to right.

== See also ==
- List of Colorado mountain ranges
- List of Colorado mountain summits
  - List of Colorado fourteeners
  - List of Colorado 4000 meter prominent summits
  - List of the most prominent summits of Colorado
- List of Colorado county high points
