= Academy Award for Best Supporting Actress =

Award presented annually by the Academy of Motion Picture Arts and Sciences

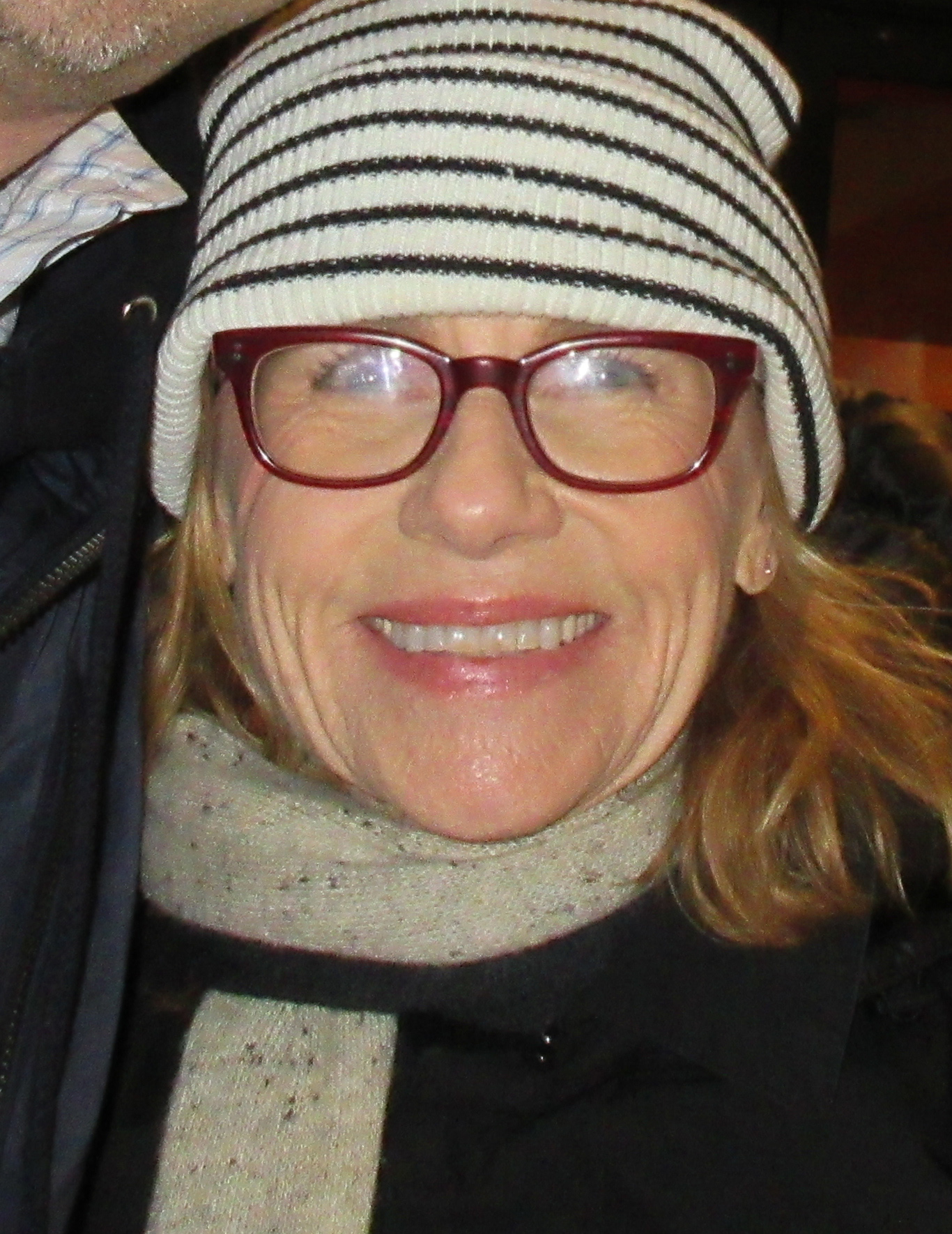
- The 2026 recipient: Amy Madigan
- Awarded for: Best Performance by an Actress in a Supporting Role
- Country: United States
- Presented by: Academy of Motion Picture Arts and Sciences (AMPAS)
- First award: March 4, 1937; 89 years ago (for films released in 1936)
- Most recent winner: Amy Madigan, Weapons (2025)

Highlights
- Most awards: Dianne Wiest and Shelley Winters (2)
- Most nominations: Thelma Ritter (6)
- Website: oscars.org

The Academy Award for Best Supporting Actress is an award presented annually by the Academy of Motion Picture Arts and Sciences (AMPAS). It has been awarded since the 9th Academy Awards to an actress who has delivered an outstanding performance in a supporting role in a film released that year. The award is traditionally presented by the previous year's Best Supporting Actor winner. However, in recent years, it has shifted towards being presented by previous years' Best Supporting Actress winners instead. In lieu of the traditional Oscar statuette, supporting acting recipients were given plaques up until the 16th Academy Awards, when statuettes were awarded to each category instead.

The Best Supporting Actress award has been presented a total of 90 times, to 88 actresses. The first winner was Gale Sondergaard for her role in Anthony Adverse (1936). The most recent winner is Amy Madigan for her role as Aunt Gladys in Weapons (2025). The record for most wins is two, held jointly by Dianne Wiest and Shelley Winters. Each other recipient has only won once, in this category. Thelma Ritter has received the most nominations in the category, with six, followed closely by Amy Adams with five, although neither has ever won—yet, in the latter's instance. Hattie McDaniel, whom the Academy sat in the back of the room, made history in 1940 when she became the first person of color to win an Oscar in any category, for her performance as Mammy in Gone with the Wind (1939).

Tatum O'Neal remains the youngest person to win a competitive acting Oscar at 10 years old, for her role in Paper Moon (1973). With five minutes and two seconds of screentime (the majority in one scene), Beatrice Straight's performance in Network (1976) holds the record for the shortest to win an Oscar. The 40-year gap between Madigan's nomination for Weapons and her previous one for Twice in a Lifetime (1985) set the record for longest gap between Oscar nominations for an actress.

== Nominations process ==
Nominees are currently determined by single transferable vote within the actors branch of AMPAS; winners are selected by a plurality vote from the entire eligible voting members of the Academy.

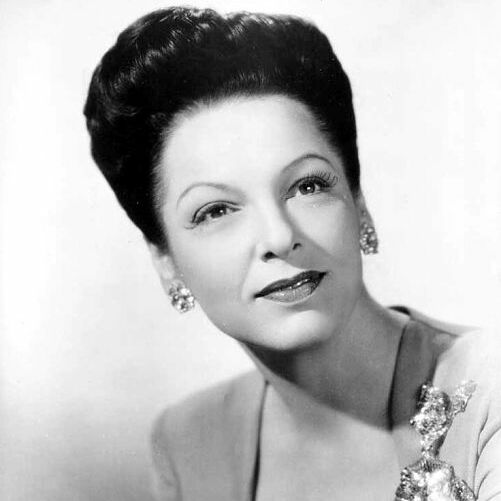
Gale Sondergaard was the inaugural winner, for Anthony Adverse (1936).

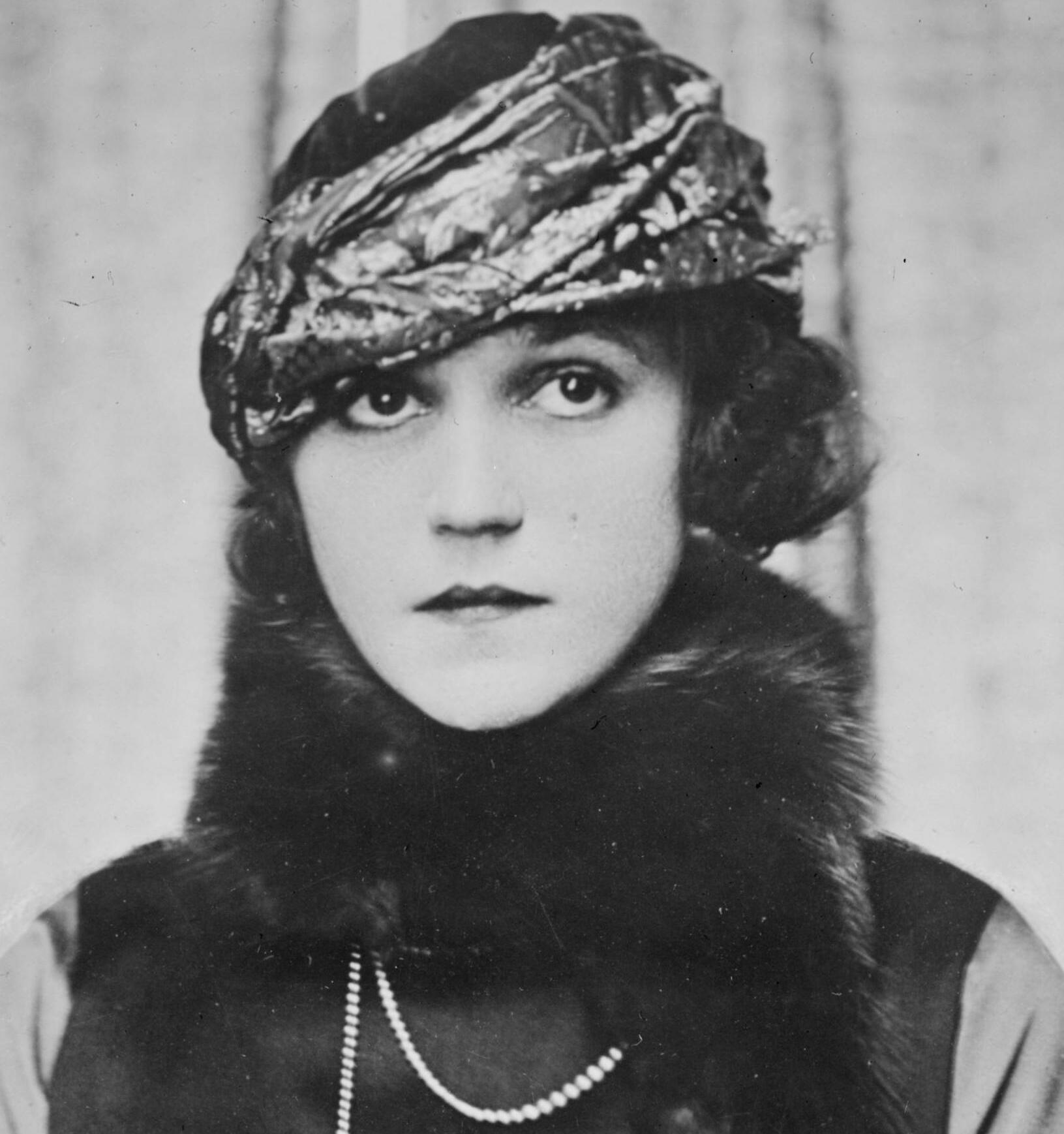
Alice Brady won for In Old Chicago (1938).

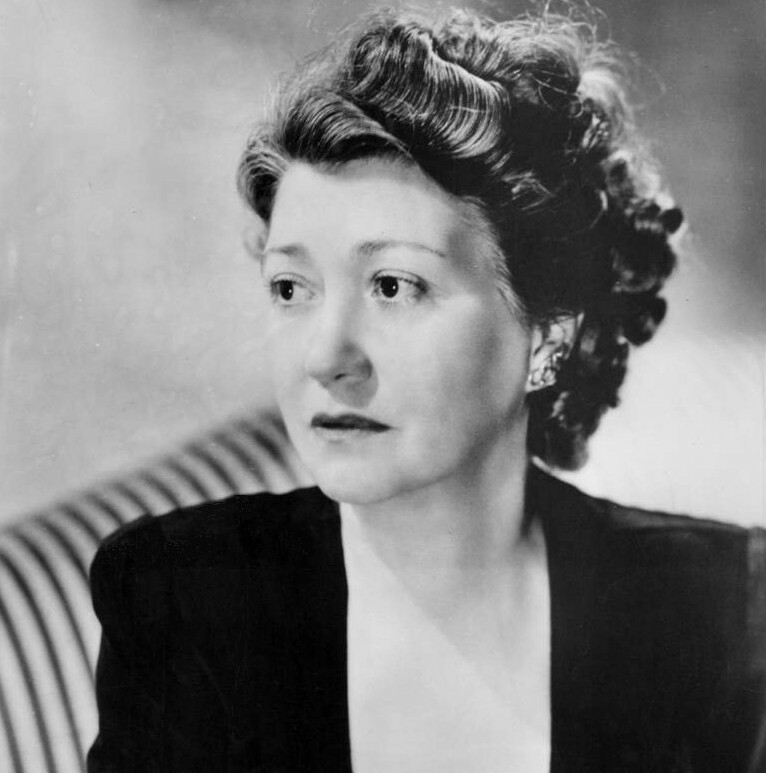
Fay Bainter won for Jezebel (1938); also the first person nominated in both supporting and lead in the same year.

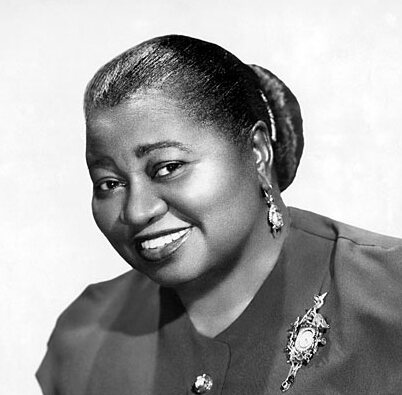
Hattie McDaniel won for Gone with the Wind (1939); first black person to ever win an Oscar.

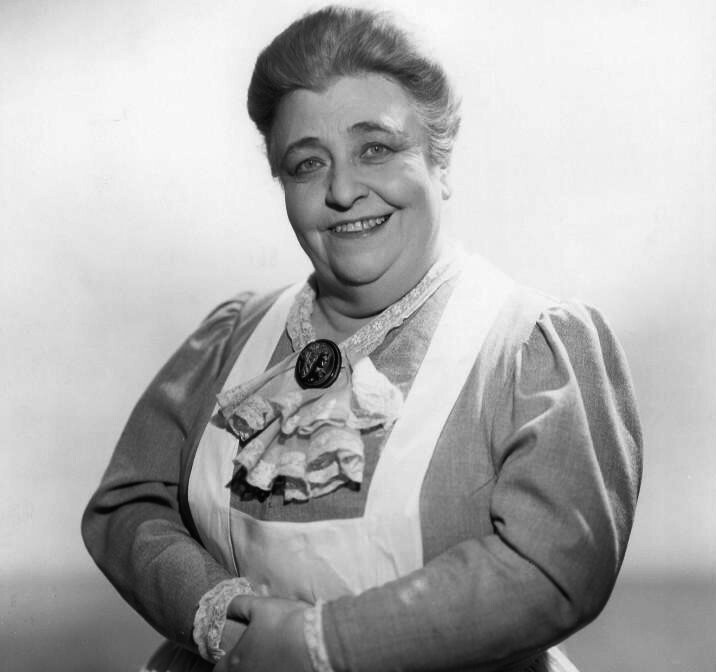
Jane Darwell won for The Grapes of Wrath (1940).

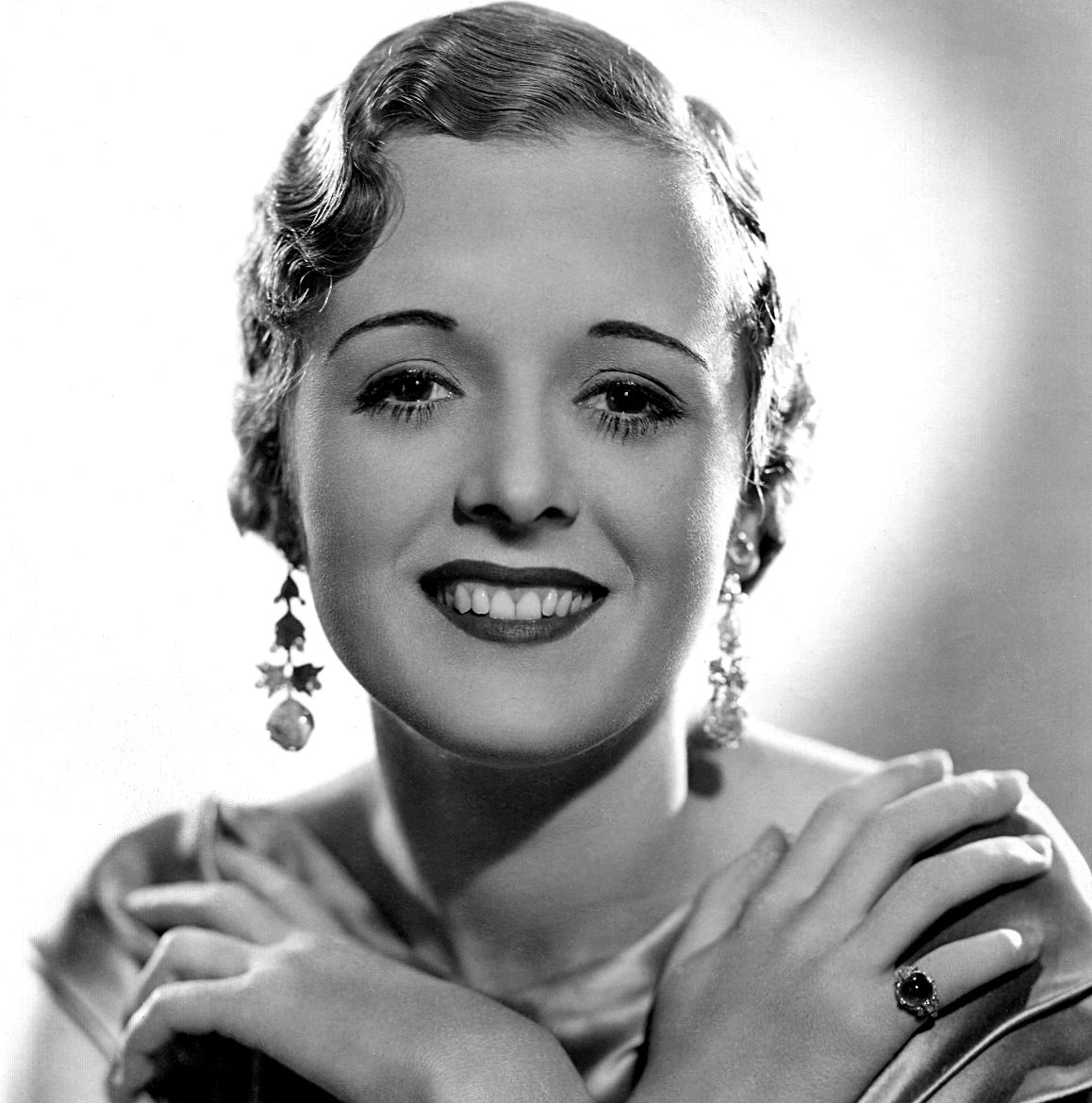
Mary Astor won for The Great Lie (1941).

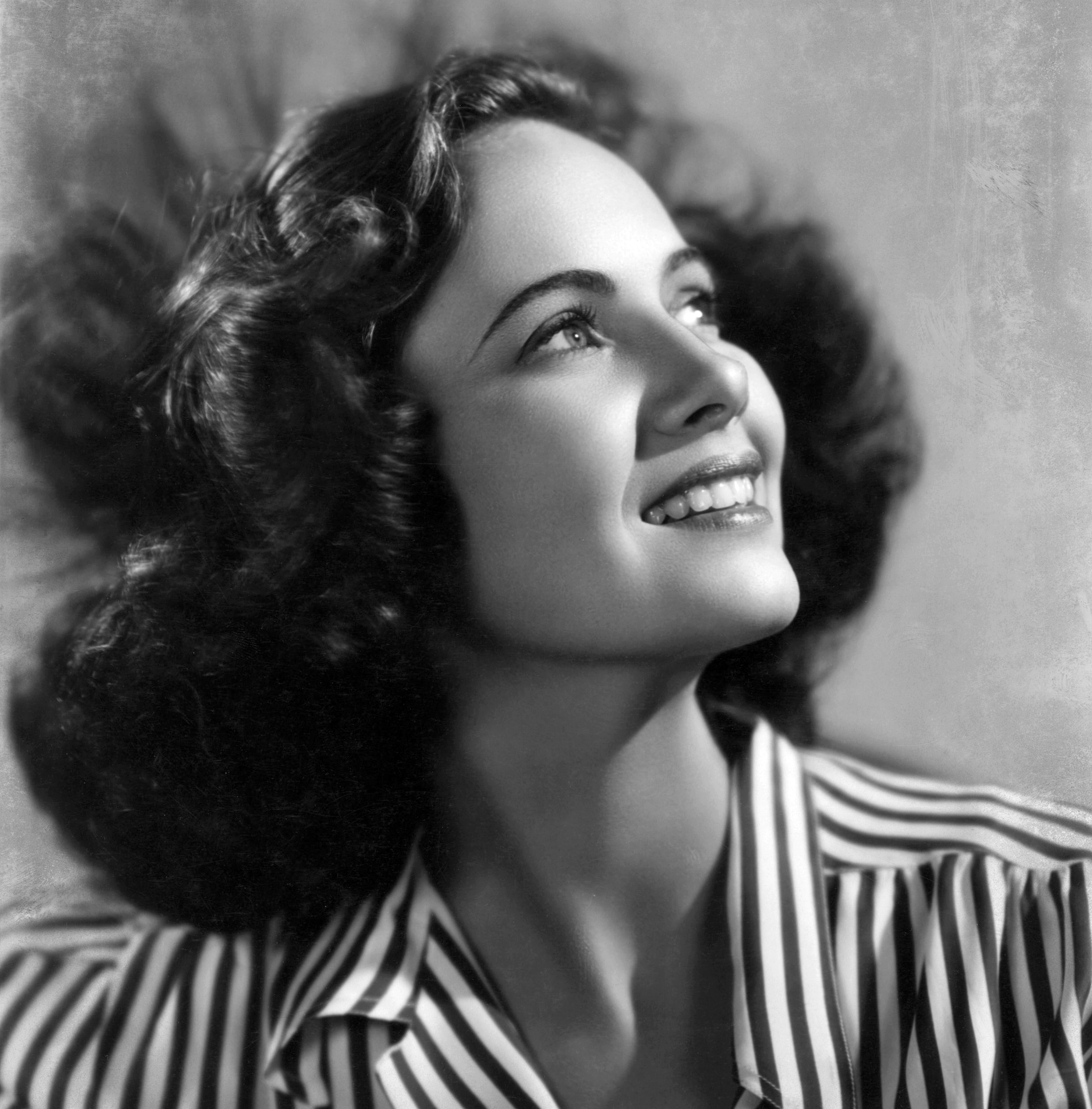
Teresa Wright won for Mrs. Miniver (1942).

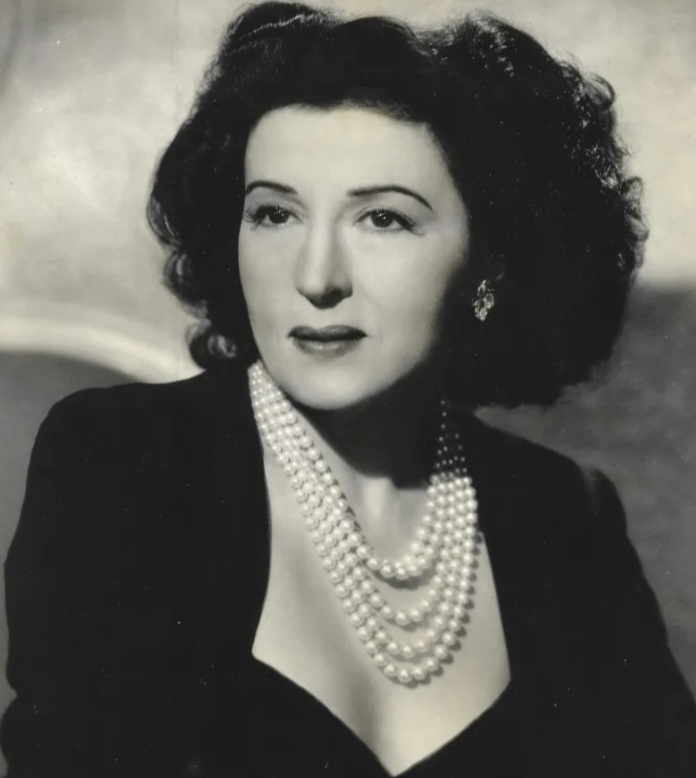
Katina Paxinou won for For Whom the Bell Tolls (1943).

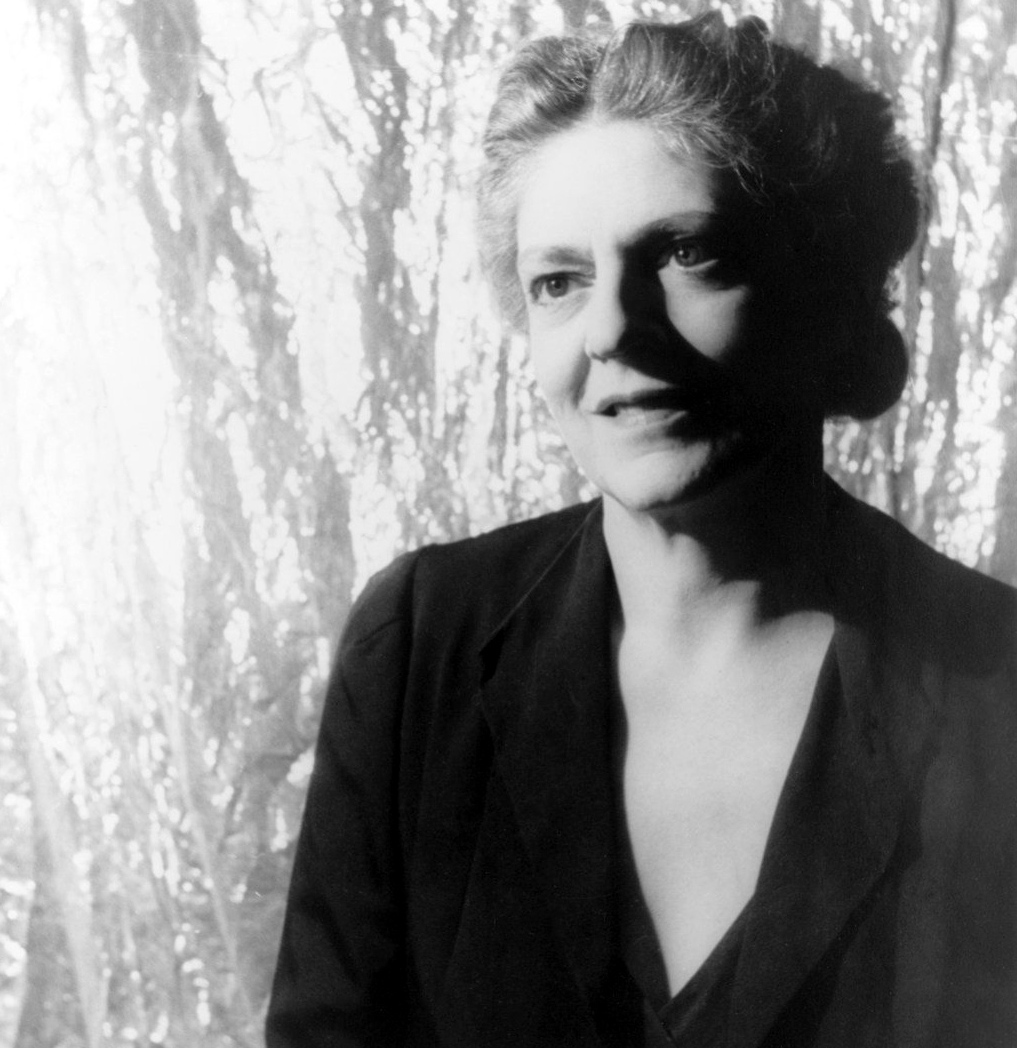
Ethel Barrymore won for None but the Lonely Heart (1944).

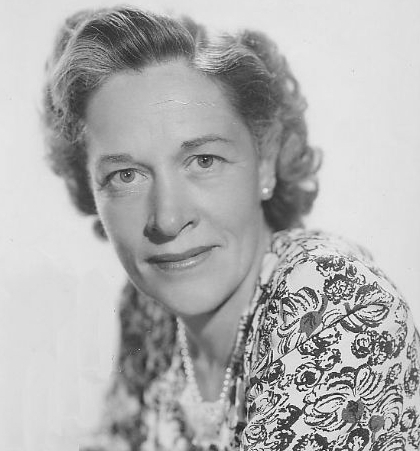
Anne Revere won for National Velvet (1945).

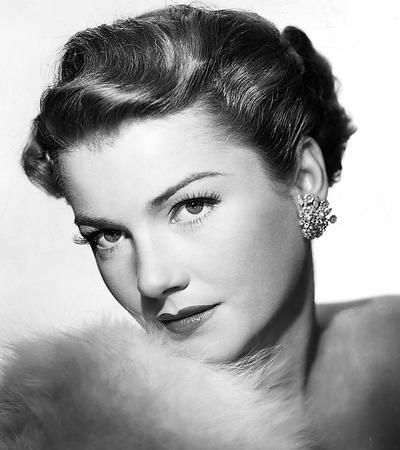
Anne Baxter won for The Razor's Edge (1946).

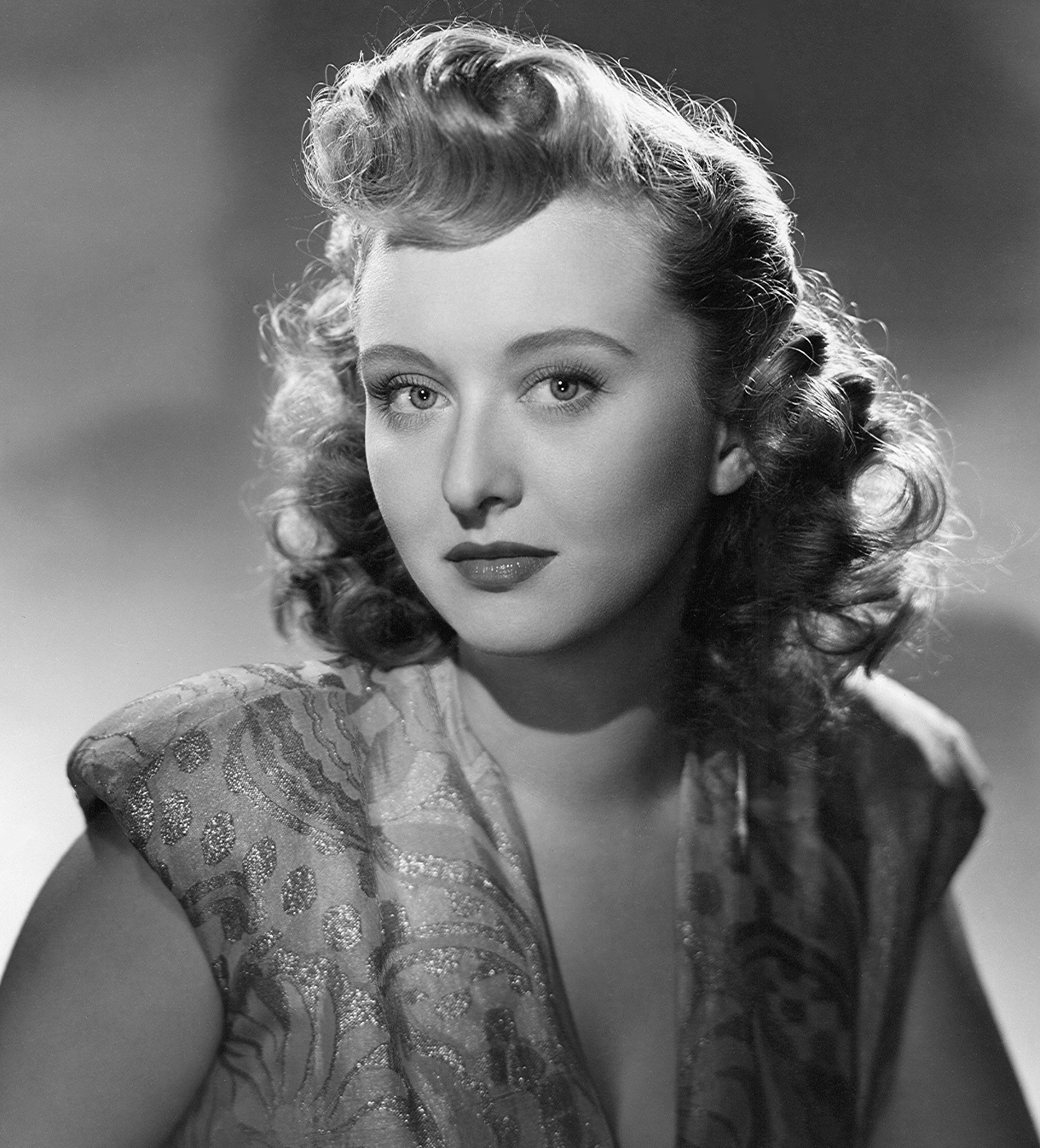
Celeste Holm won for Gentleman's Agreement (1947).

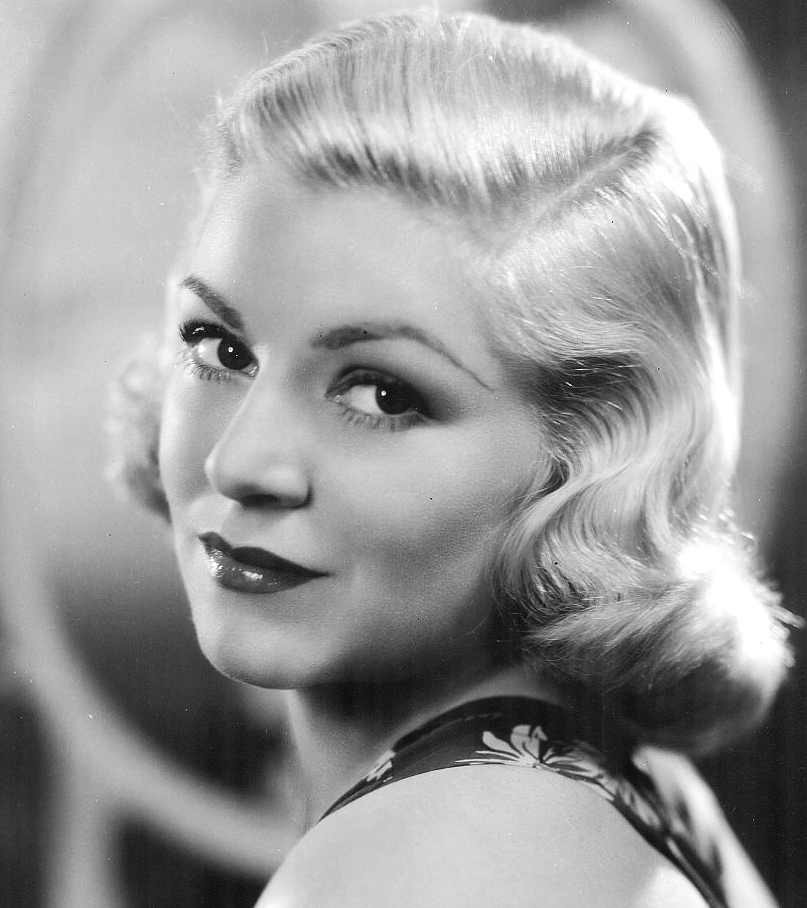
Claire Trevor won for Key Largo (1948).

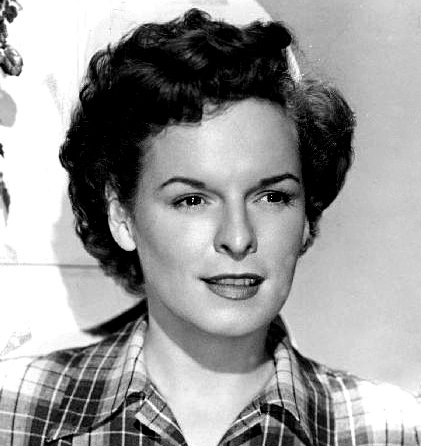
Mercedes McCambridge won for All the King's Men (1949).

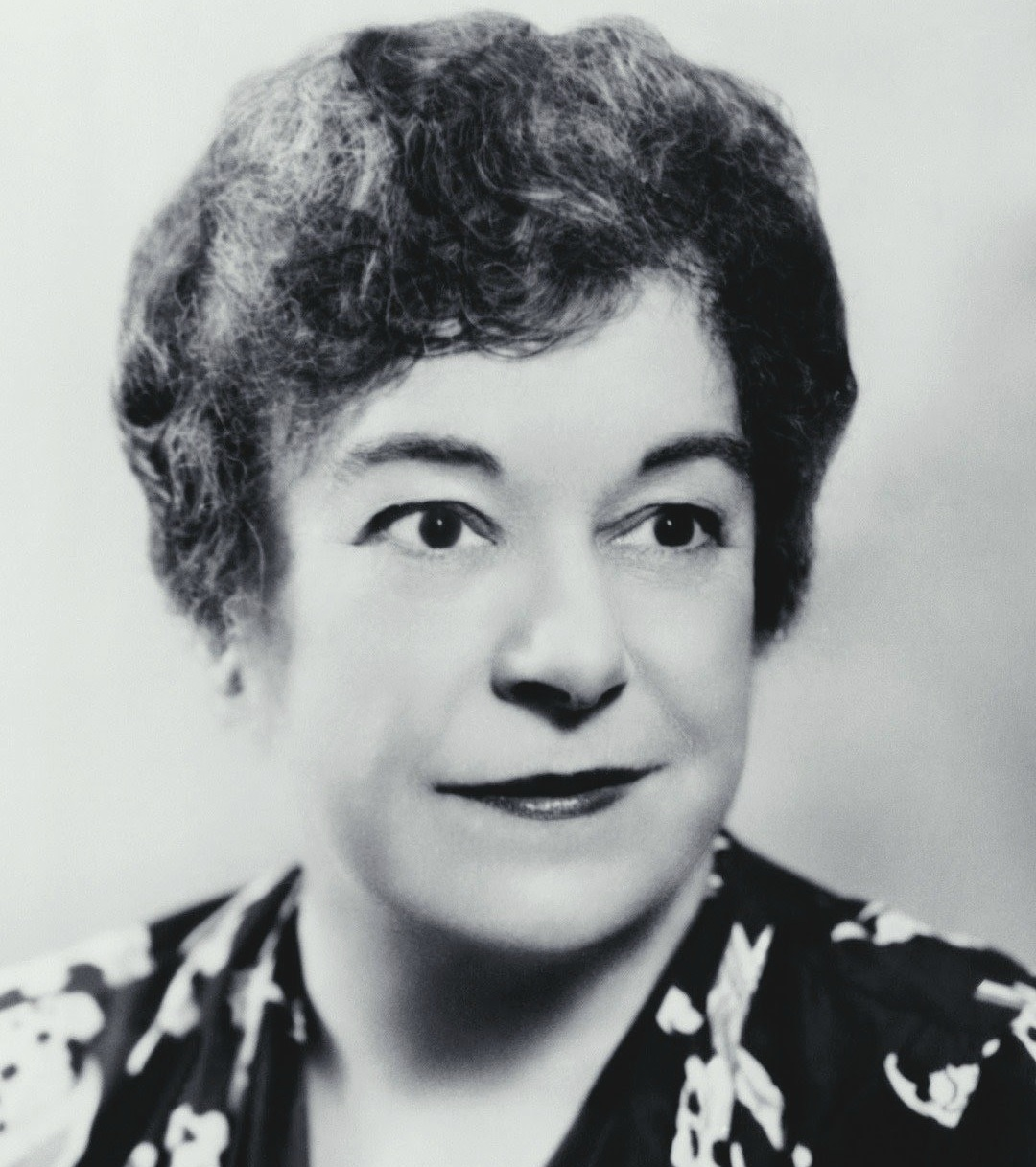
Josephine Hull won for Harvey (1950).

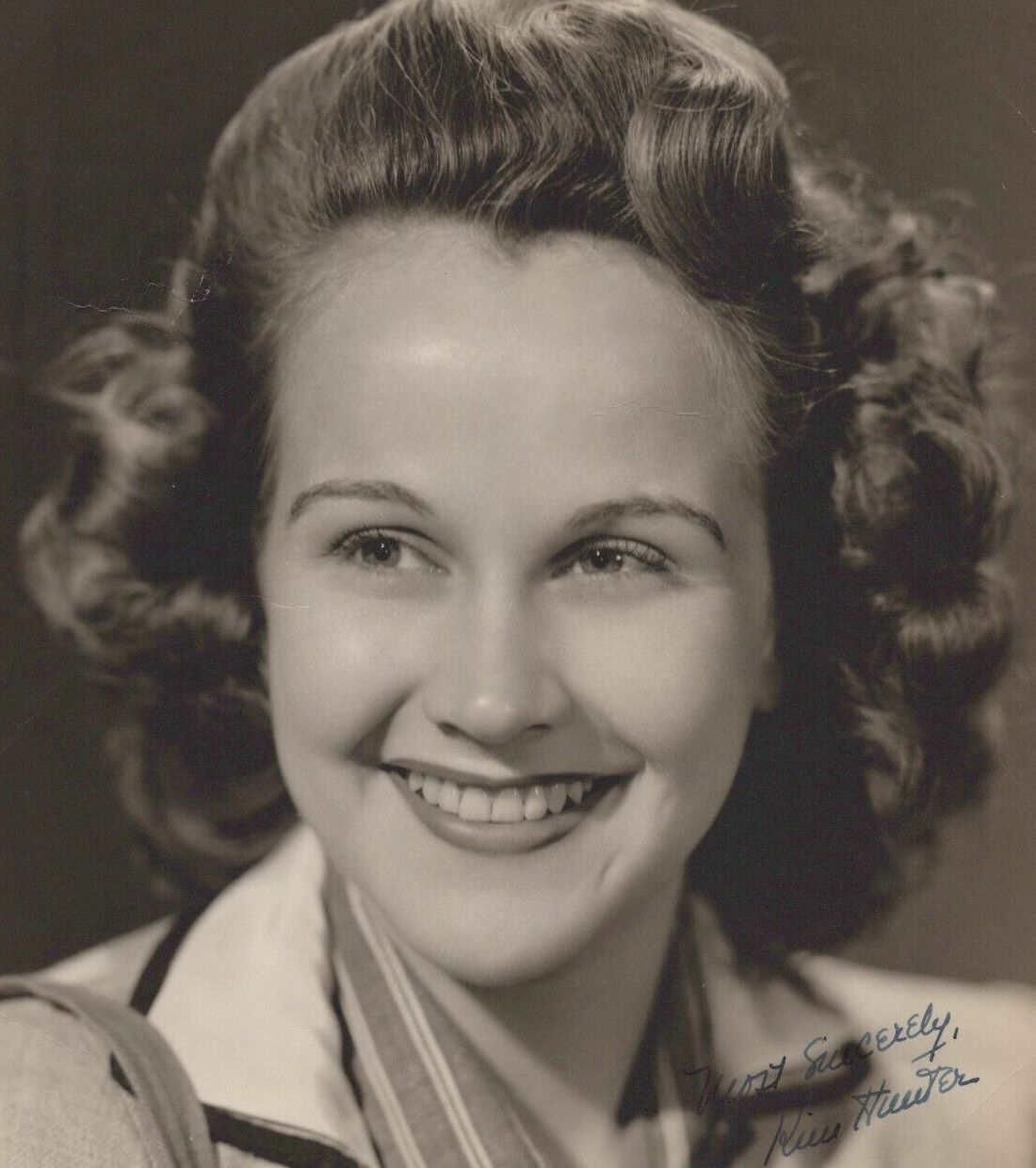
Kim Hunter won for A Streetcar Named Desire (1951).

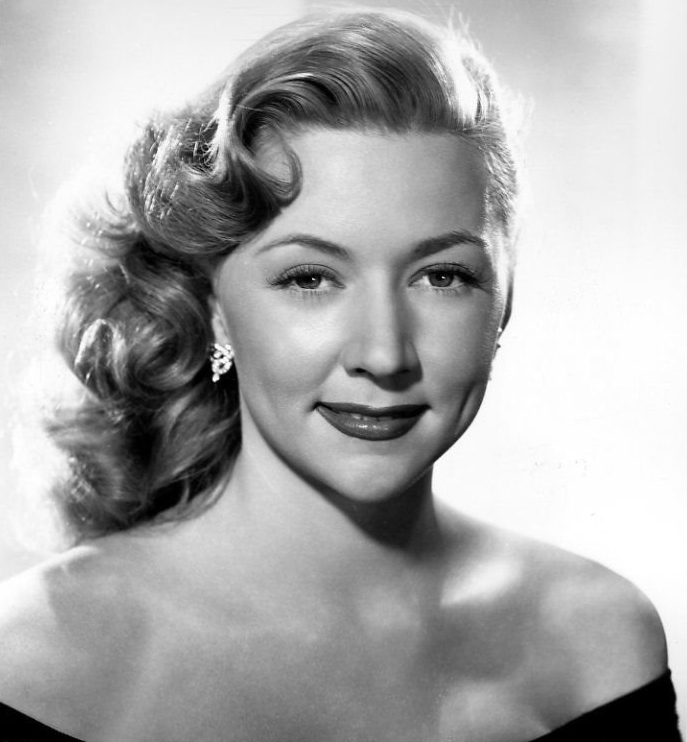
Gloria Grahame won for The Bad and the Beautiful (1952).

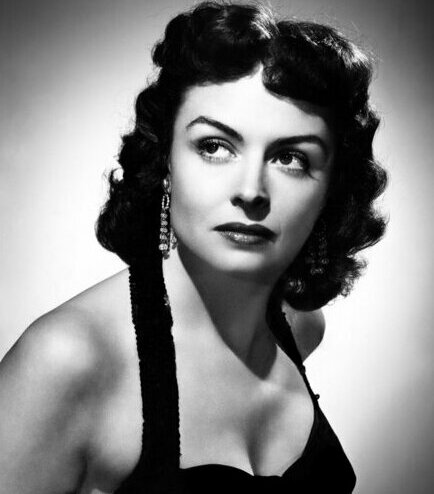
Donna Reed won for From Here to Eternity (1953).

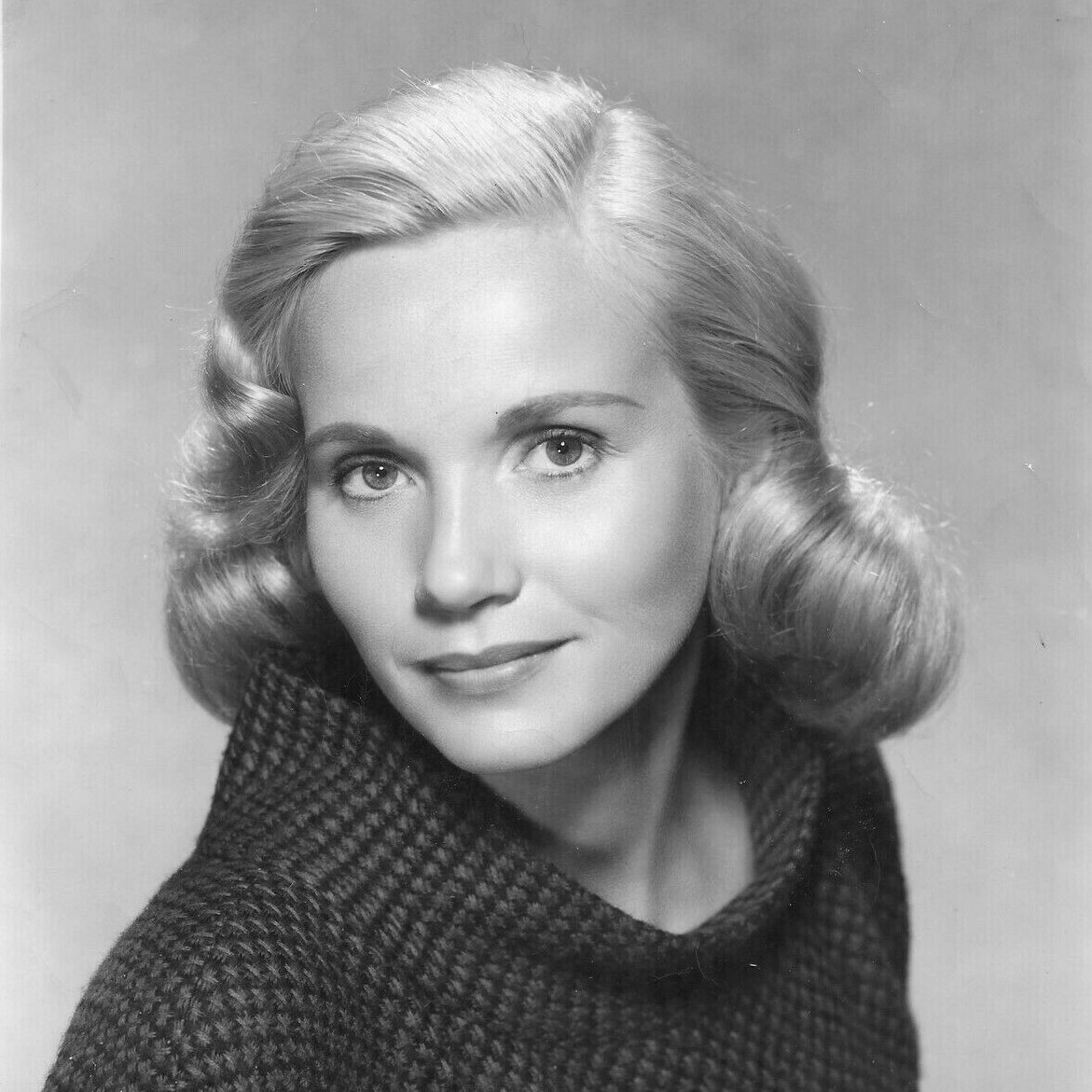
Eva Marie Saint won for On the Waterfront (1954).

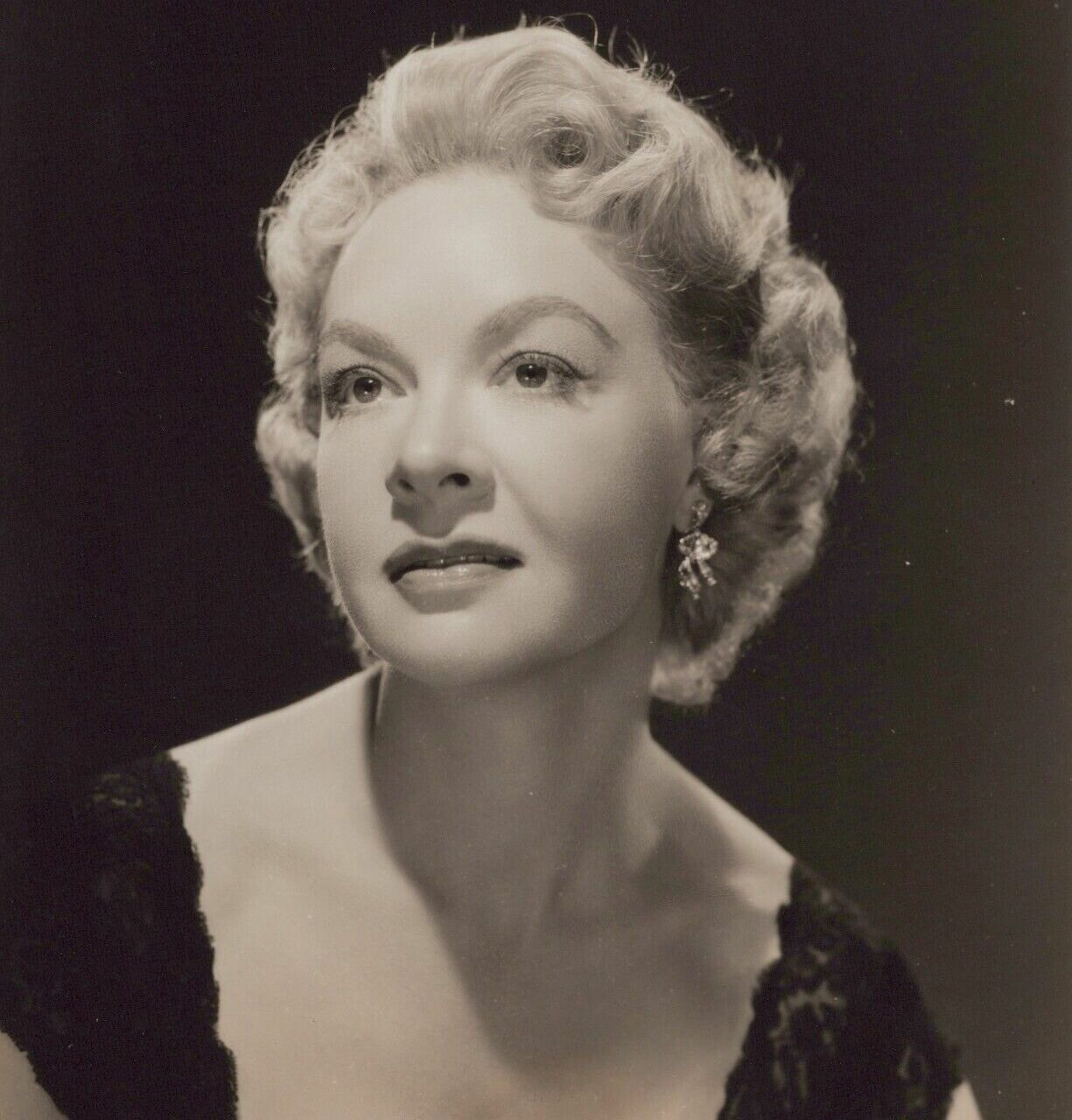
Jo Van Fleet won for East of Eden (1955).

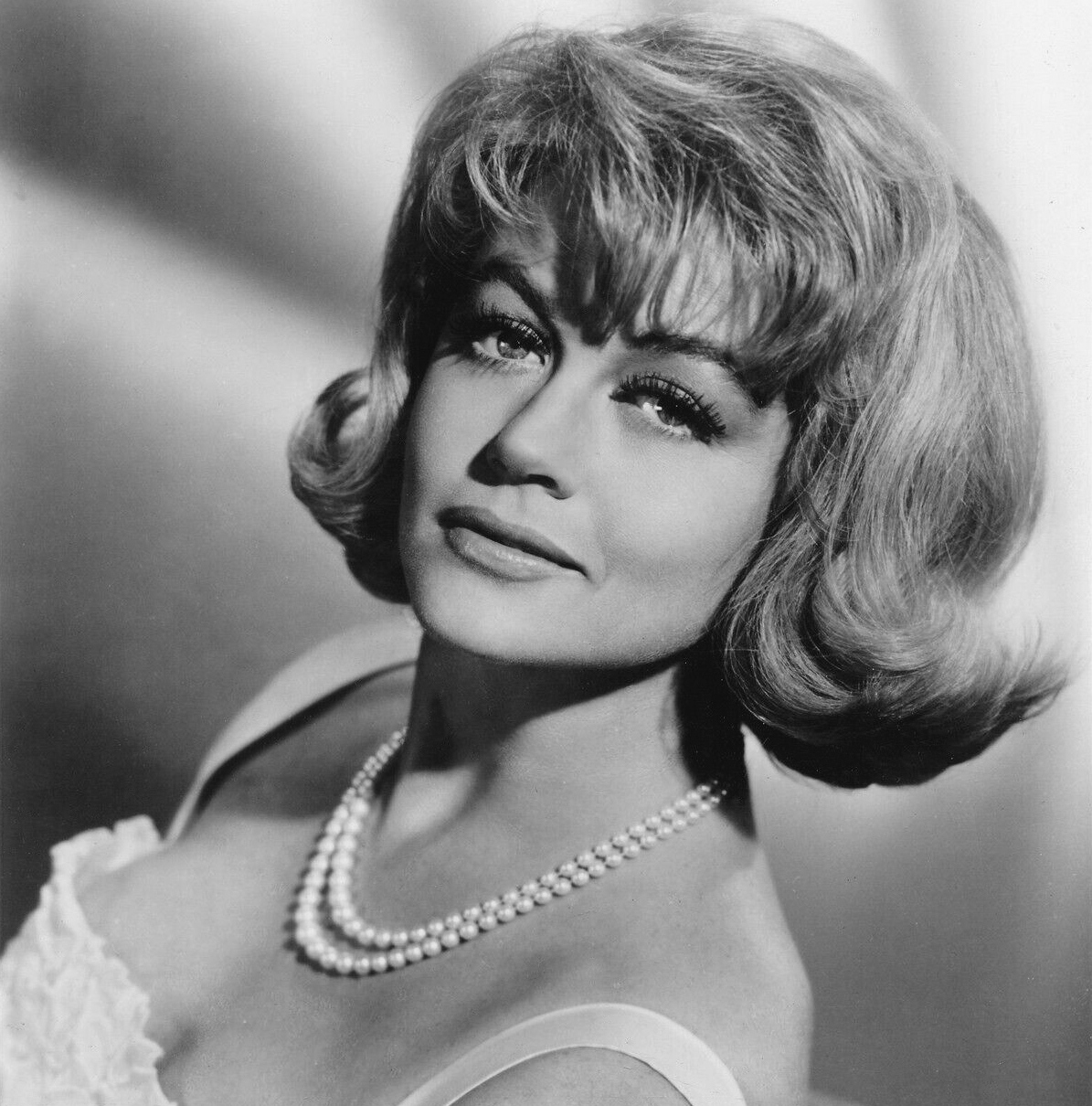
Dorothy Malone won for Written on the Wind (1956).

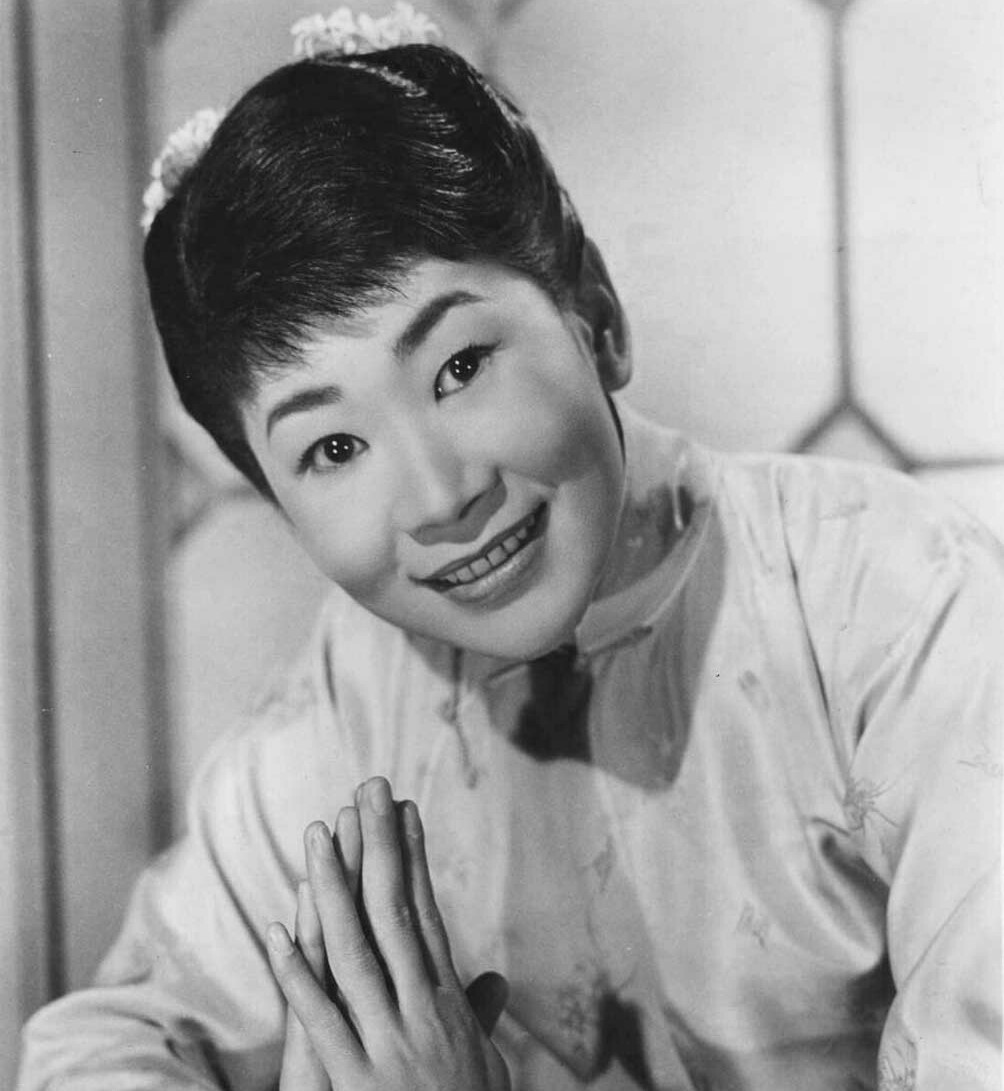
Miyoshi Umeki won for Sayonara (1957); first East Asian acting winner.

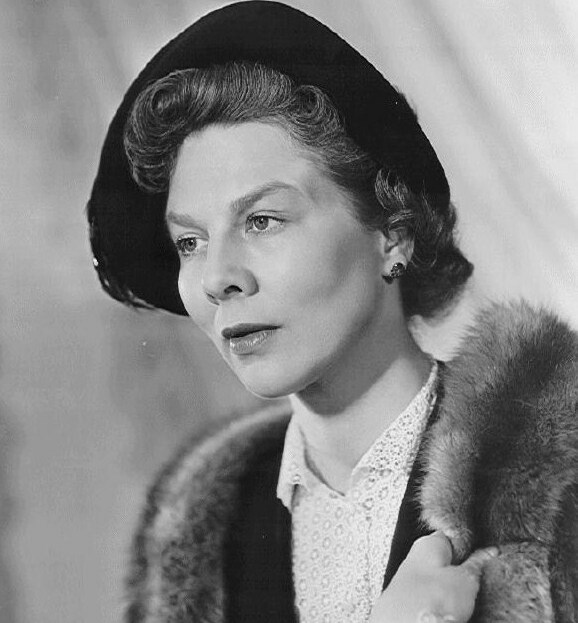
Wendy Hiller won for Separate Tables (1958).

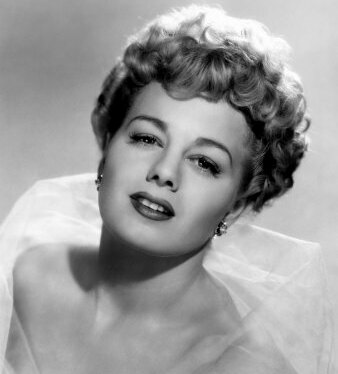
Shelley Winters won twice, for The Diary of Anne Frank (1959) and A Patch of Blue (1965).

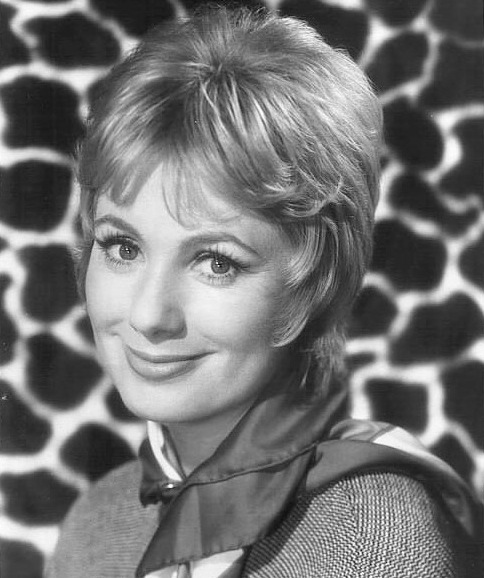
Shirley Jones won for Elmer Gantry (1960).

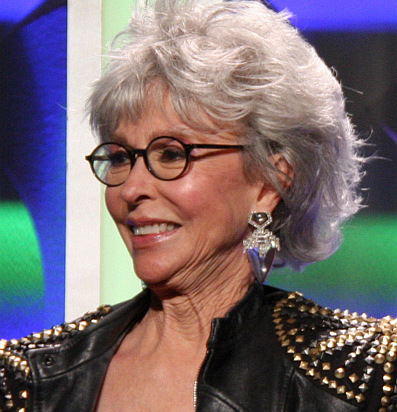
Rita Moreno won for West Side Story (1961); first Latina winner.

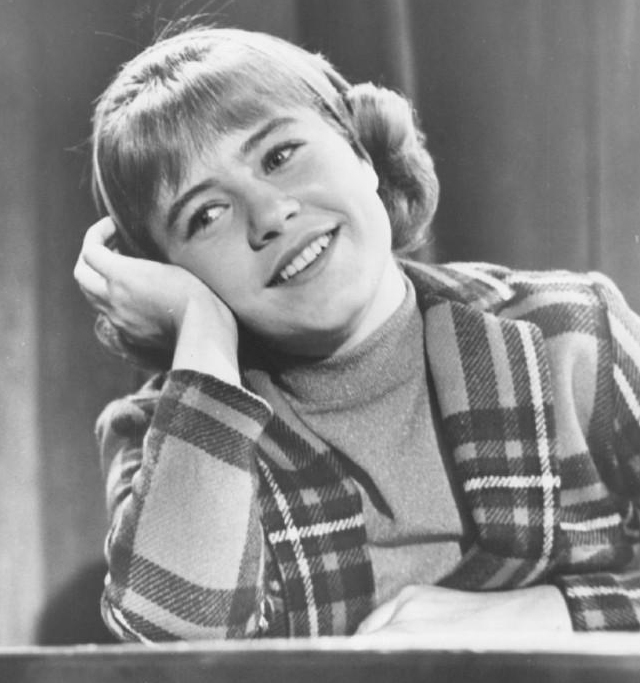
Patty Duke won for The Miracle Worker (1962).

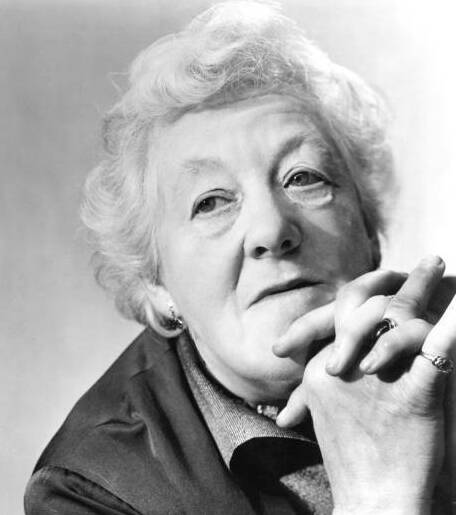
Margaret Rutherford won for The V.I.P.s (1963).

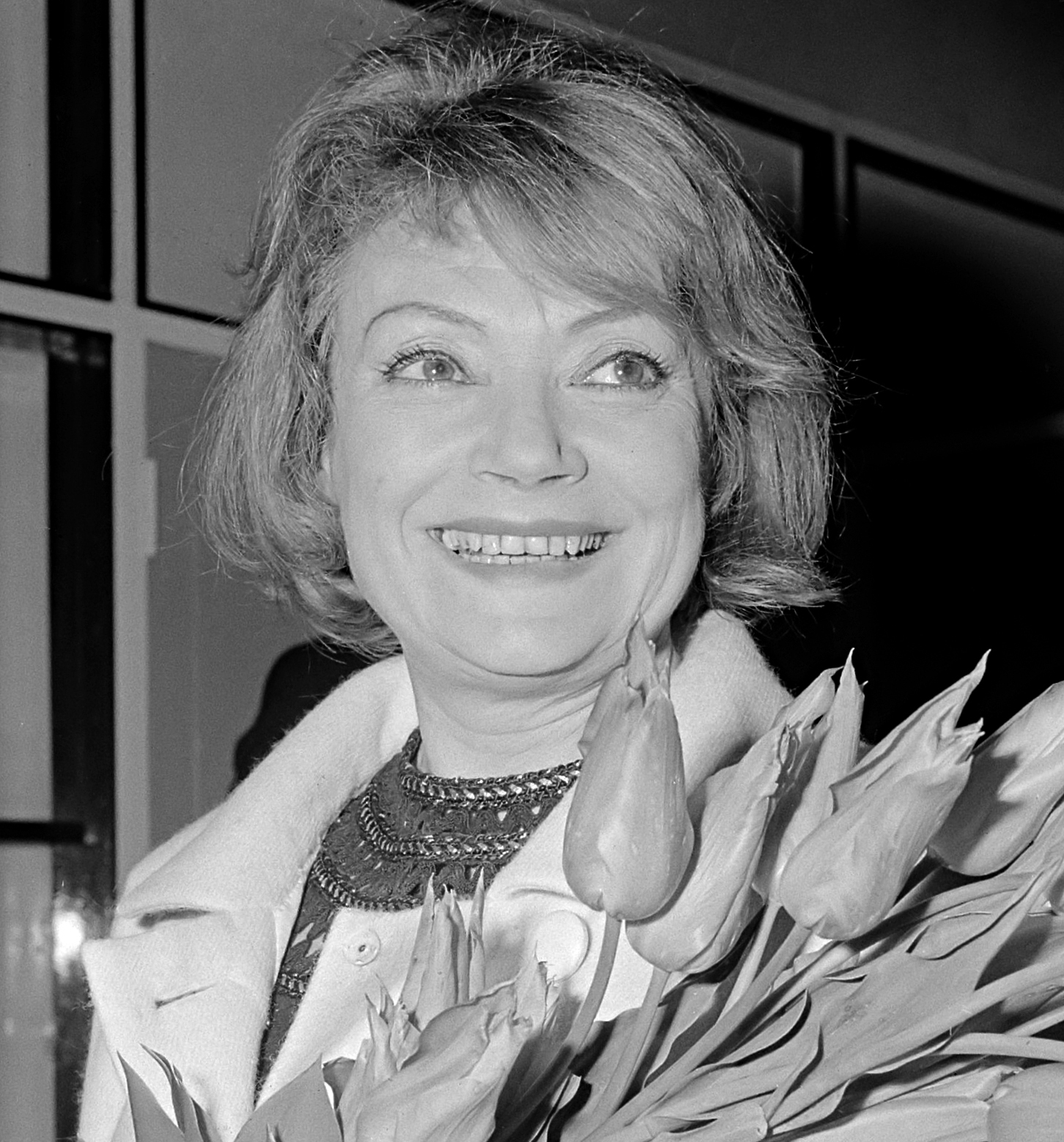
Lila Kedrova won for Zorba the Greek (1964).

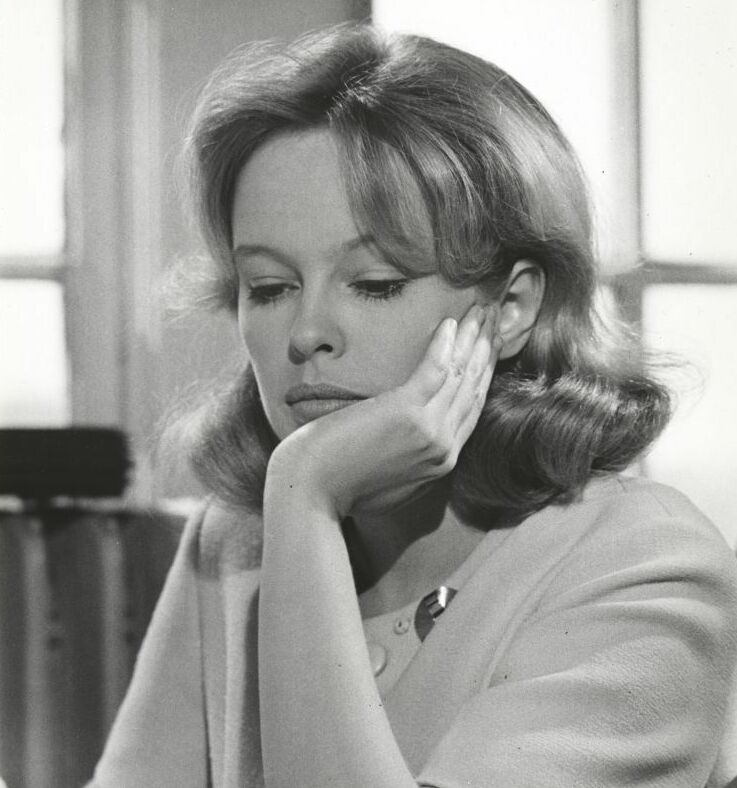
Sandy Dennis won for Who's Afraid of Virginia Woolf? (1966).

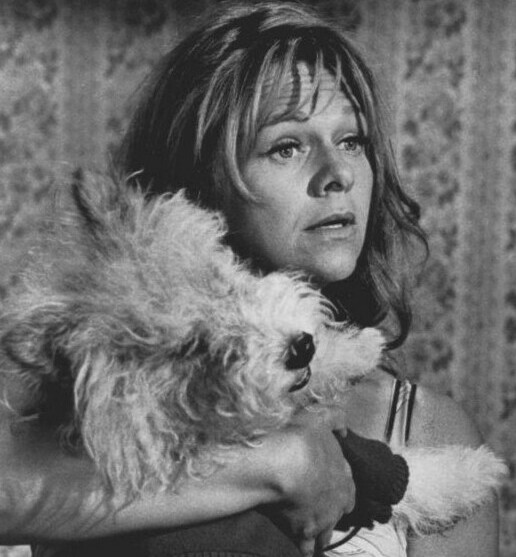
Estelle Parsons won for Bonnie and Clyde (1967).

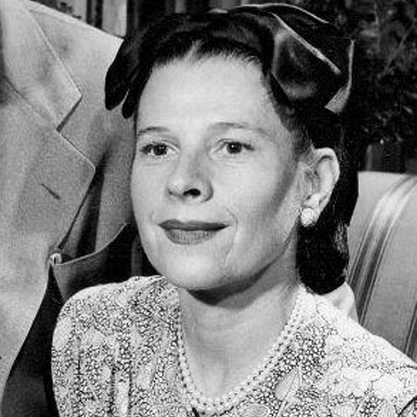
Ruth Gordon won for Rosemary's Baby (1968).

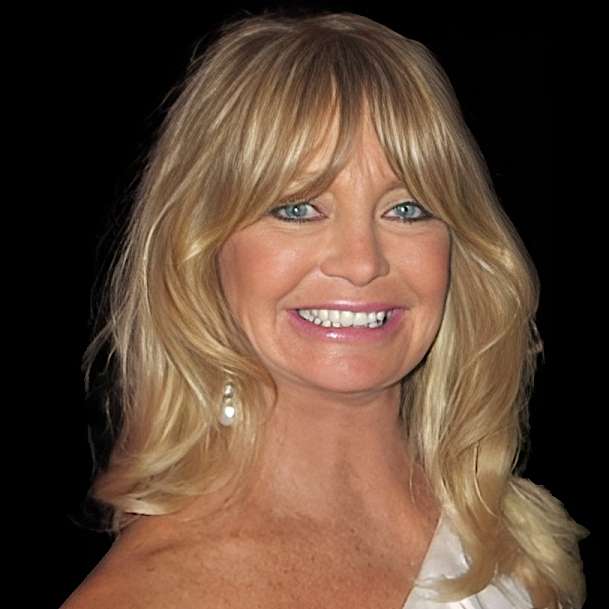
Goldie Hawn won for Cactus Flower (1969).

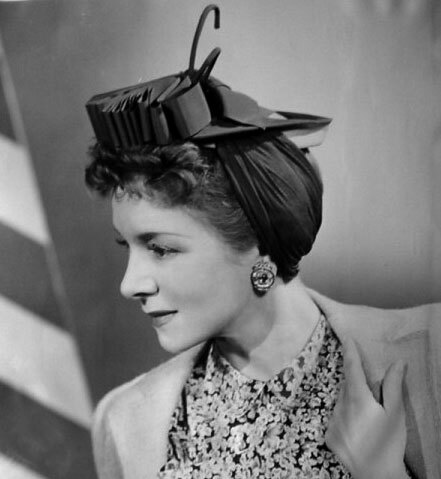
Helen Hayes won for Airport (1970); first to achieve the "Triple Crown of Acting".

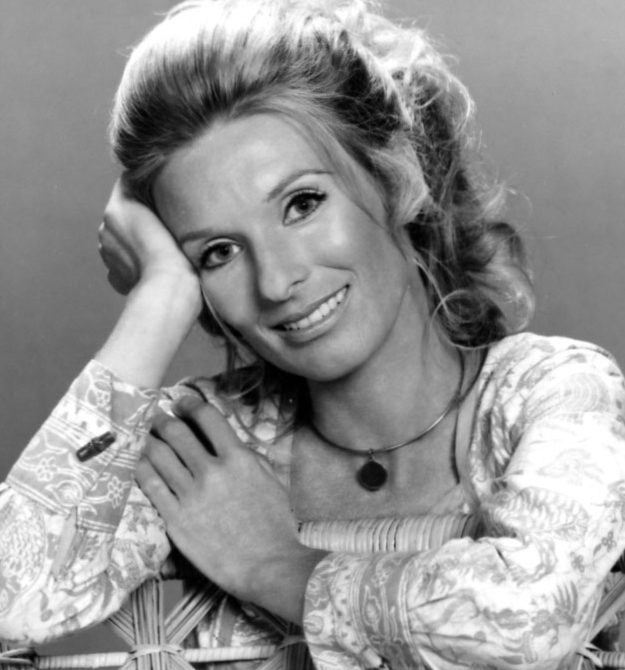
Cloris Leachman won for The Last Picture Show (1971).

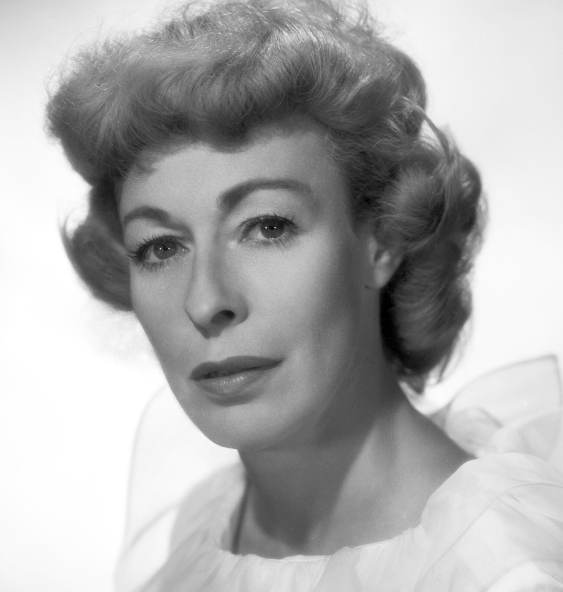
Eileen Heckart won for Butterflies Are Free (1972).

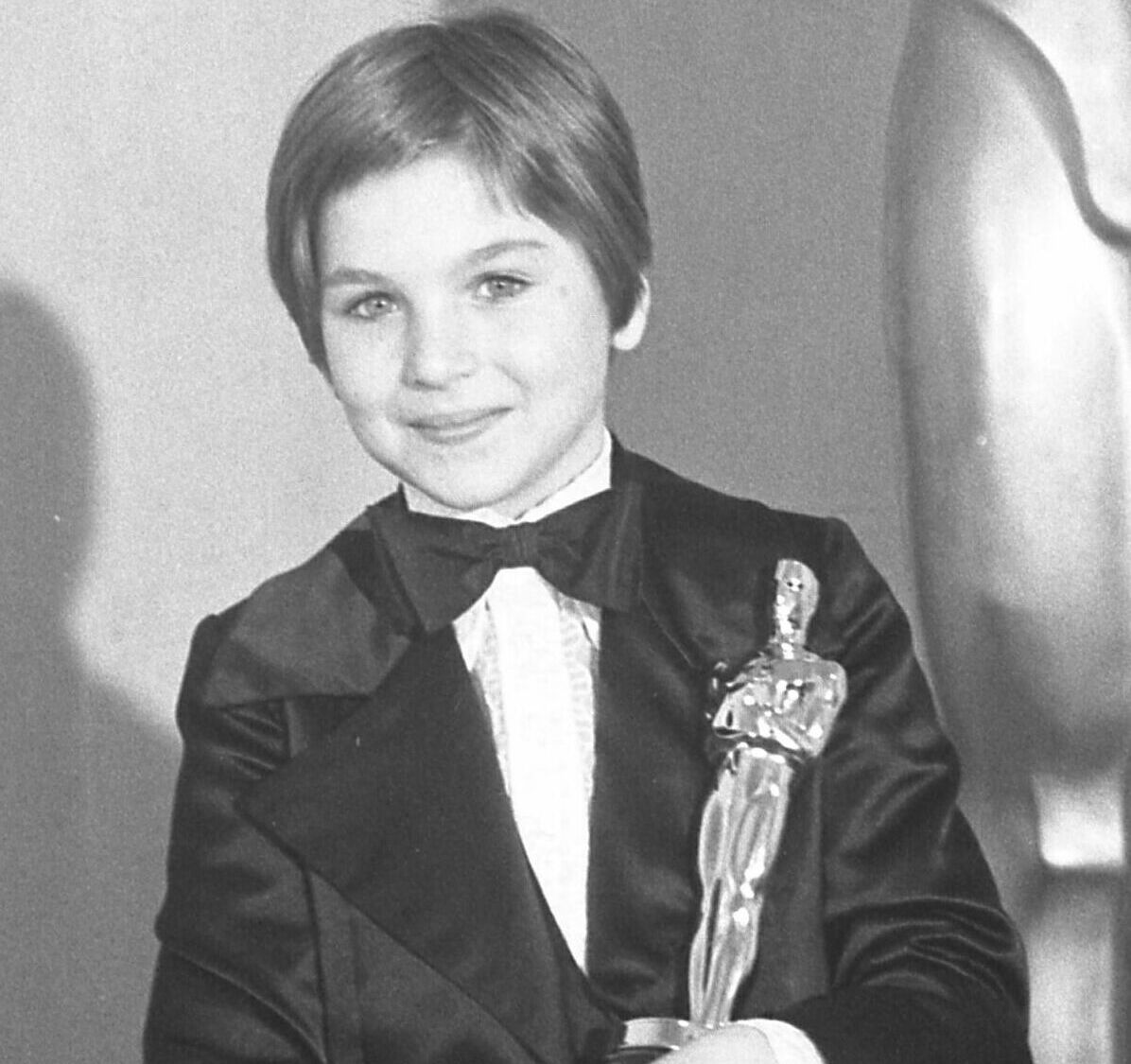
Tatum O'Neal won for Paper Moon (1973); at age 10, youngest winner of a competitive Oscar.

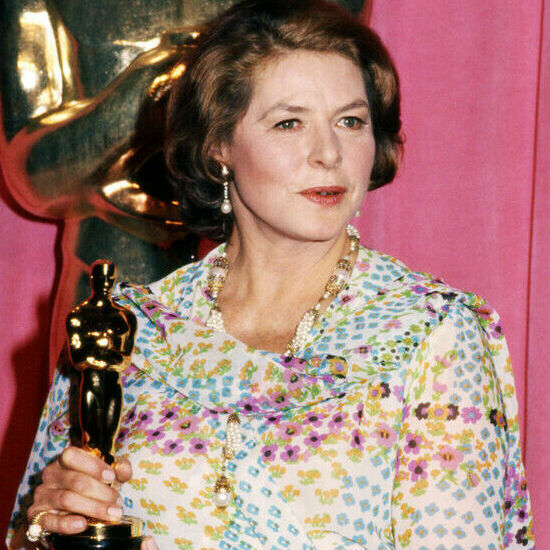
Ingrid Bergman won for Murder on the Orient Express (1974).

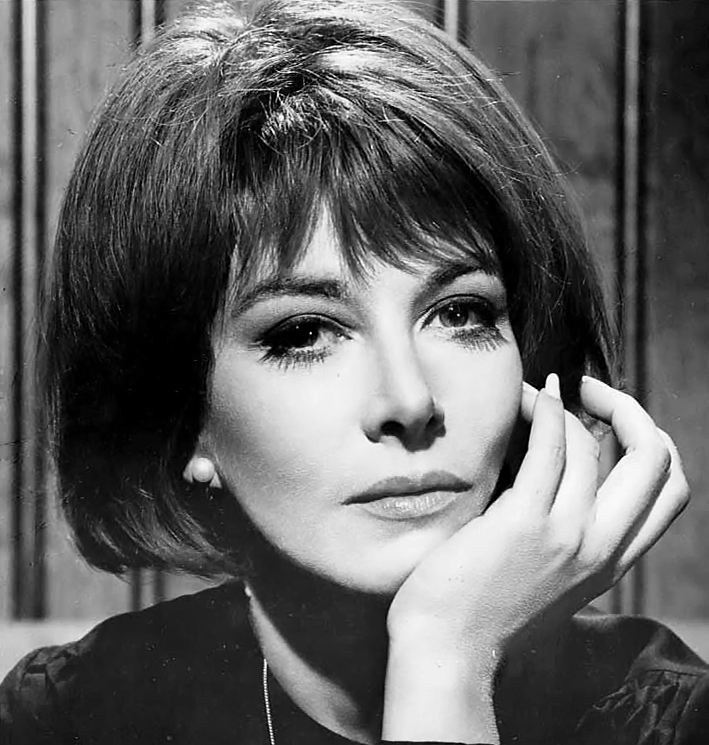
Lee Grant won for Shampoo (1975).

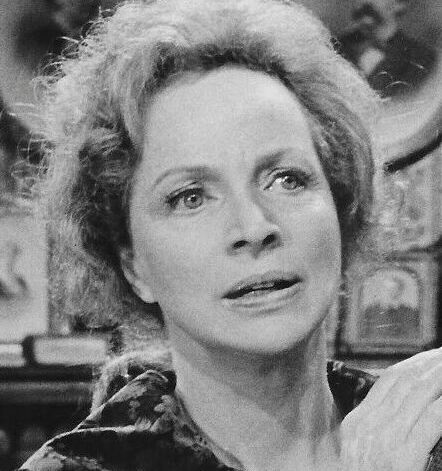
Beatrice Straight won for Network (1976); shortest performance ever to win, clocking 5m2s of screentime.

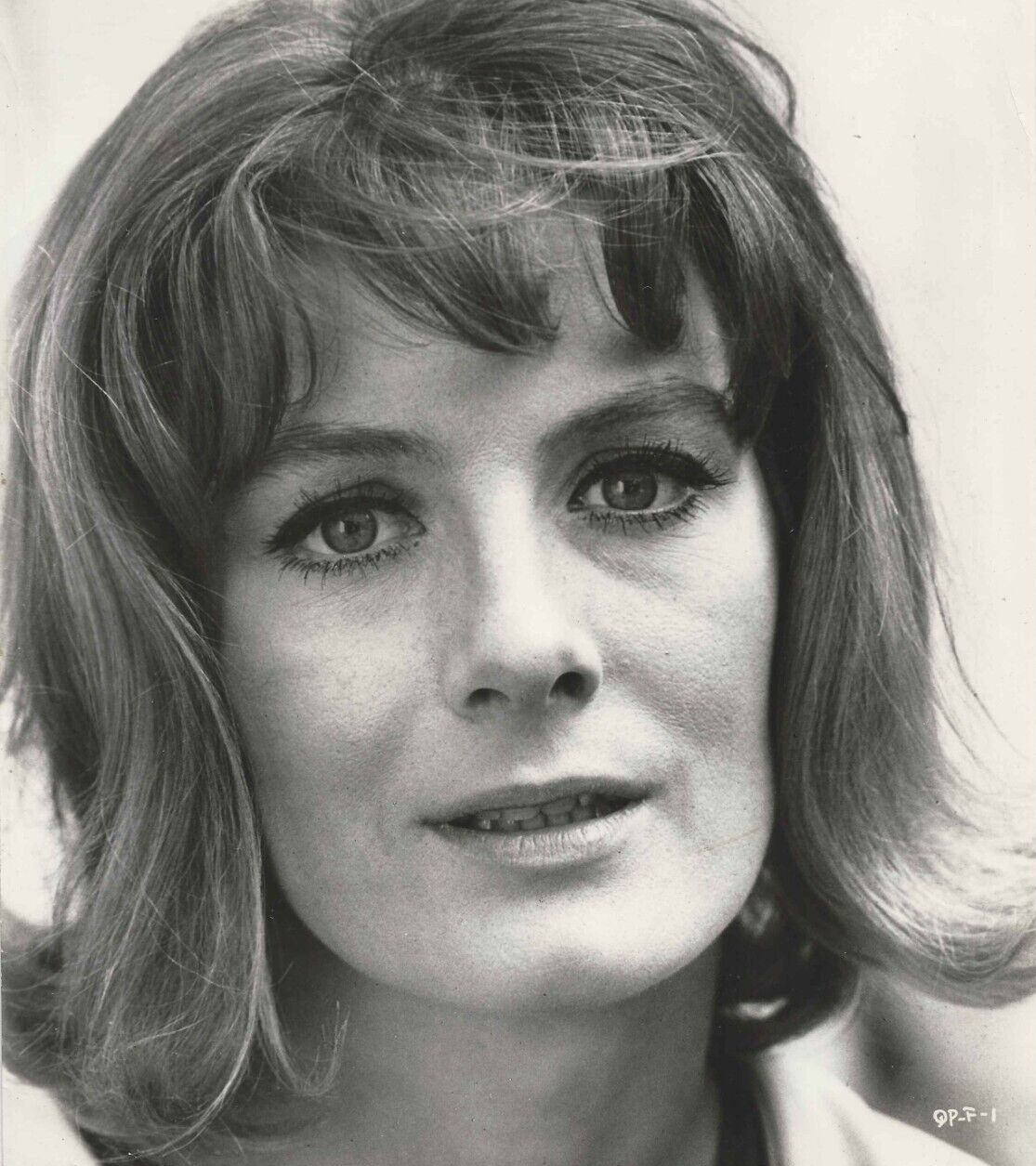
Vanessa Redgrave won for Julia (1977).

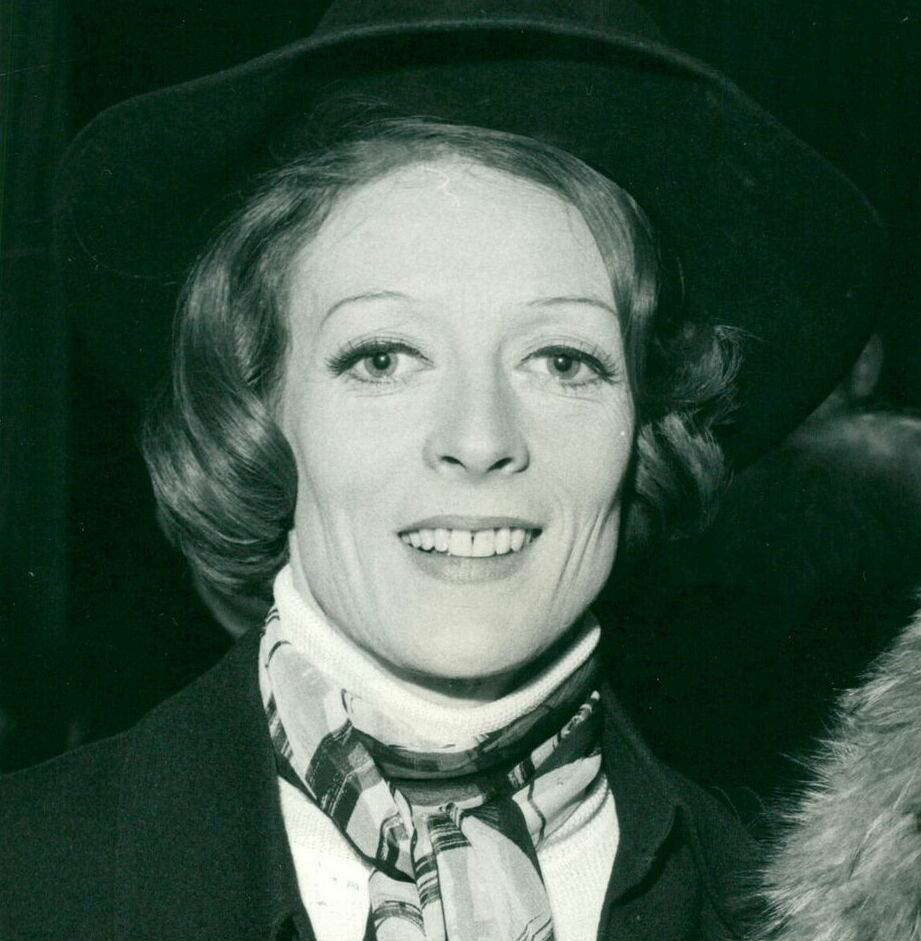
Maggie Smith won, playing an Oscar loser, for California Suite (1978).

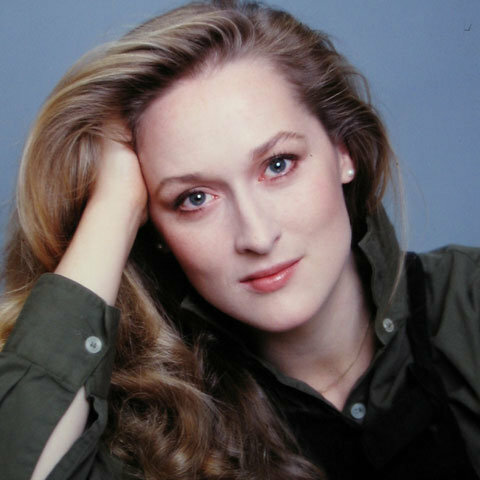
Meryl Streep won for Kramer vs. Kramer (1979).

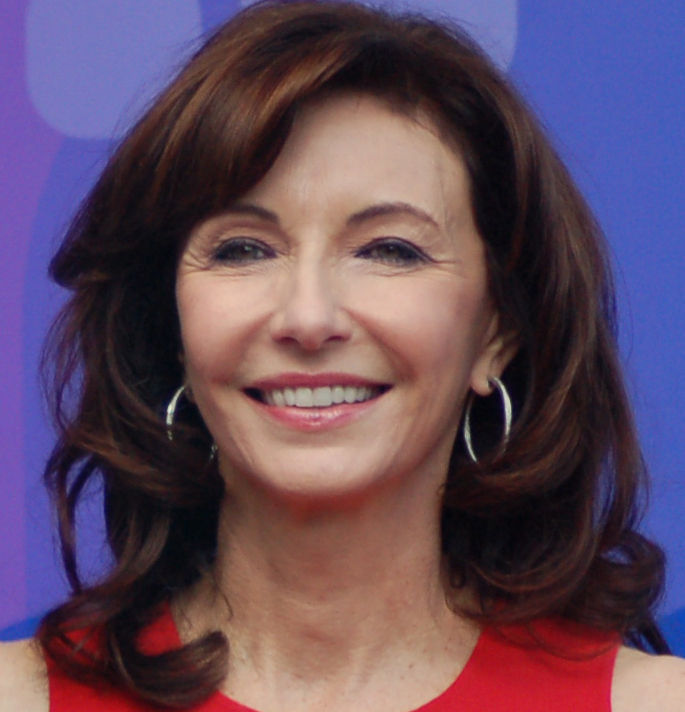
Mary Steenburgen won for Melvin (and Howard) (1980).

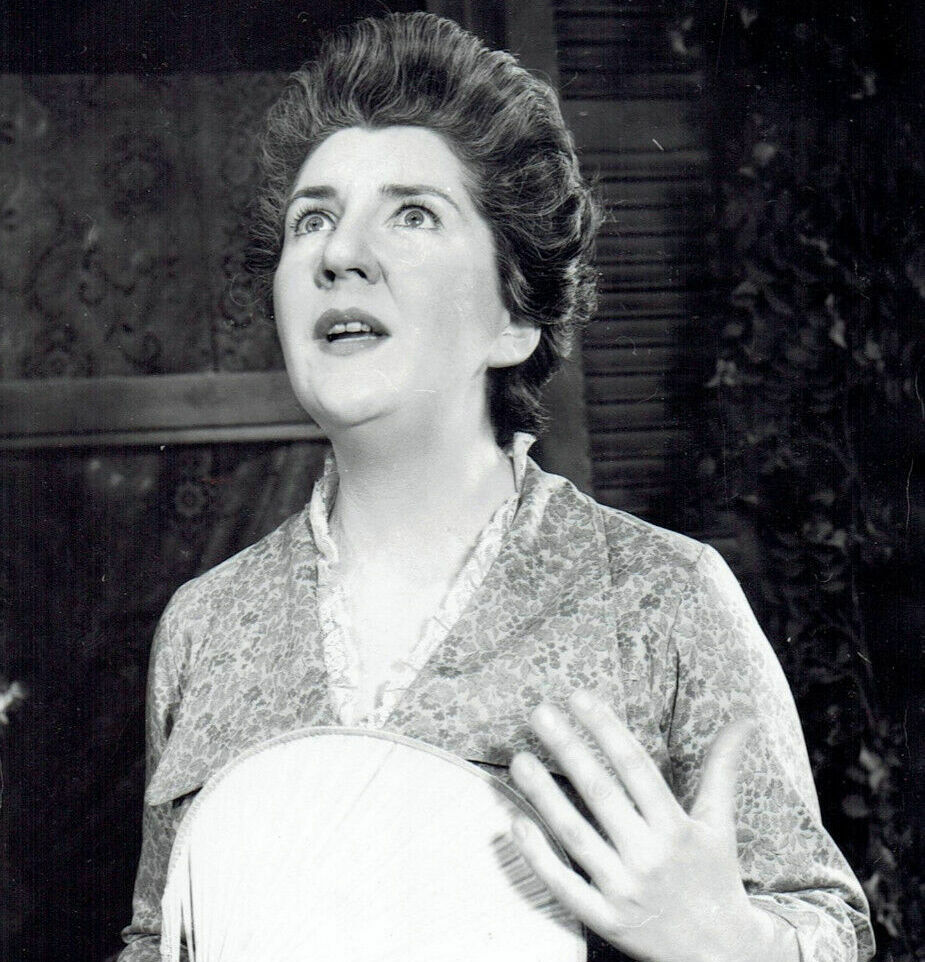
Maureen Stapleton won for Reds (1981).

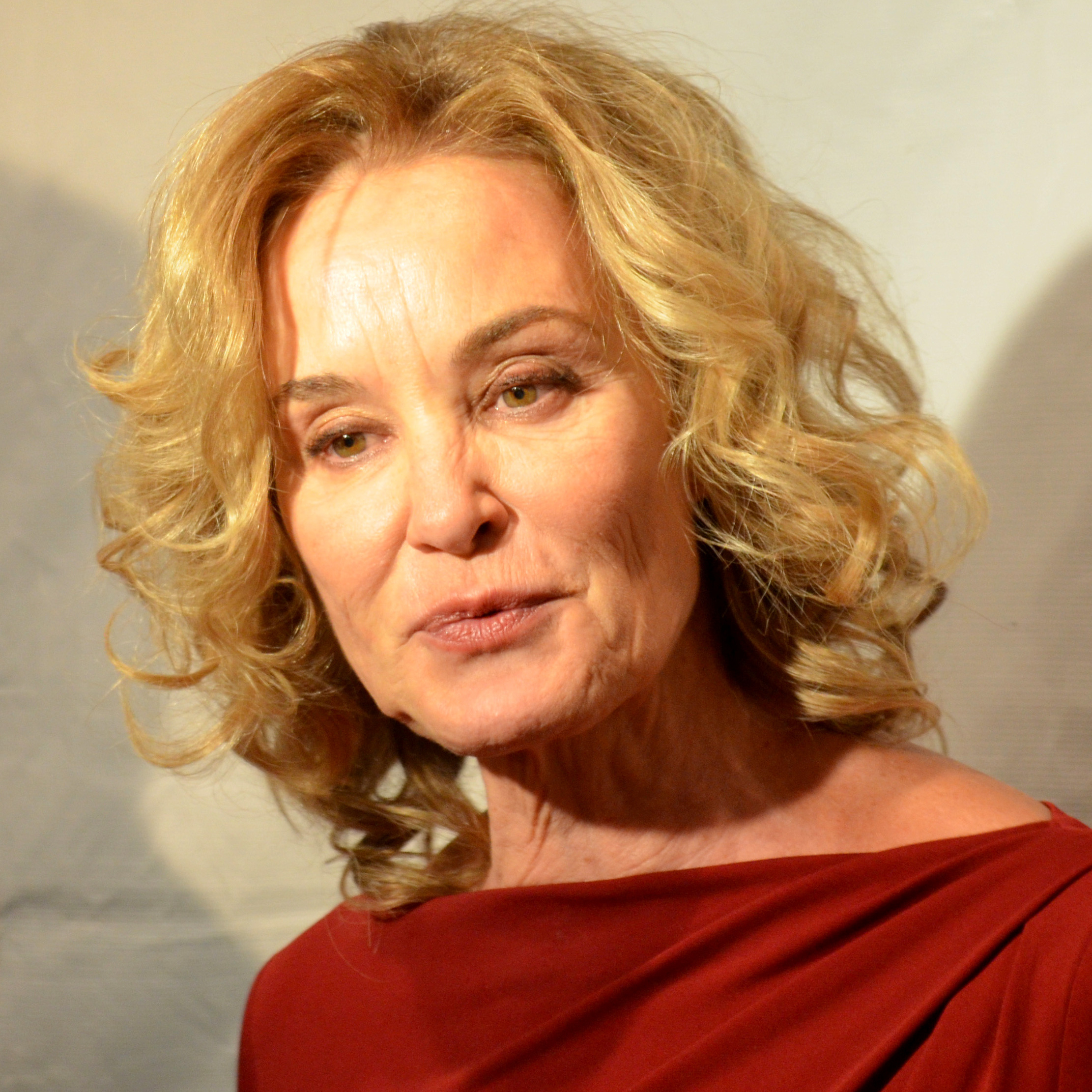
Jessica Lange won for Tootsie (1982).

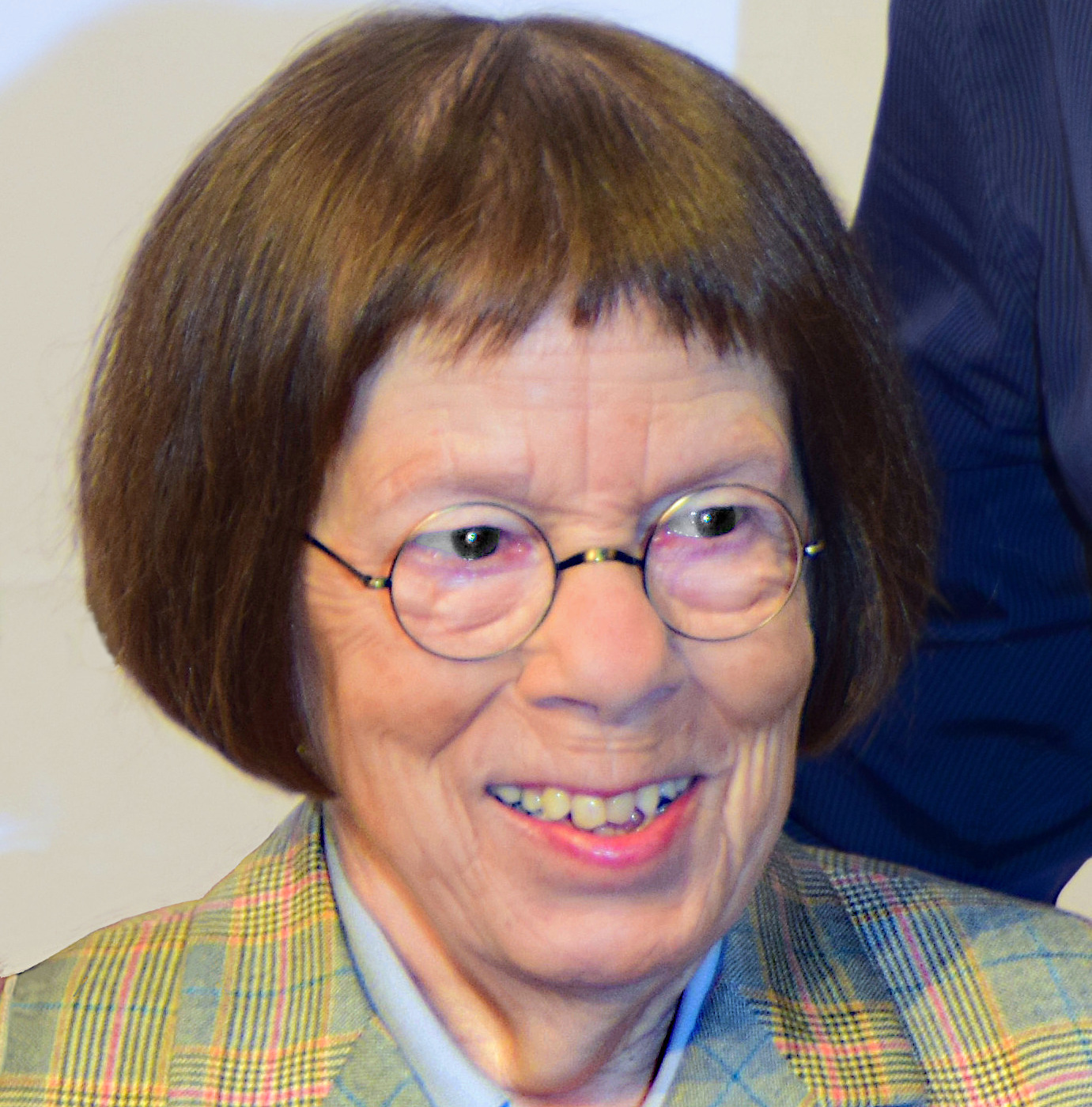
Linda Hunt won for portraying a male with dwarfism in The Year of Living Dangerously (1983).

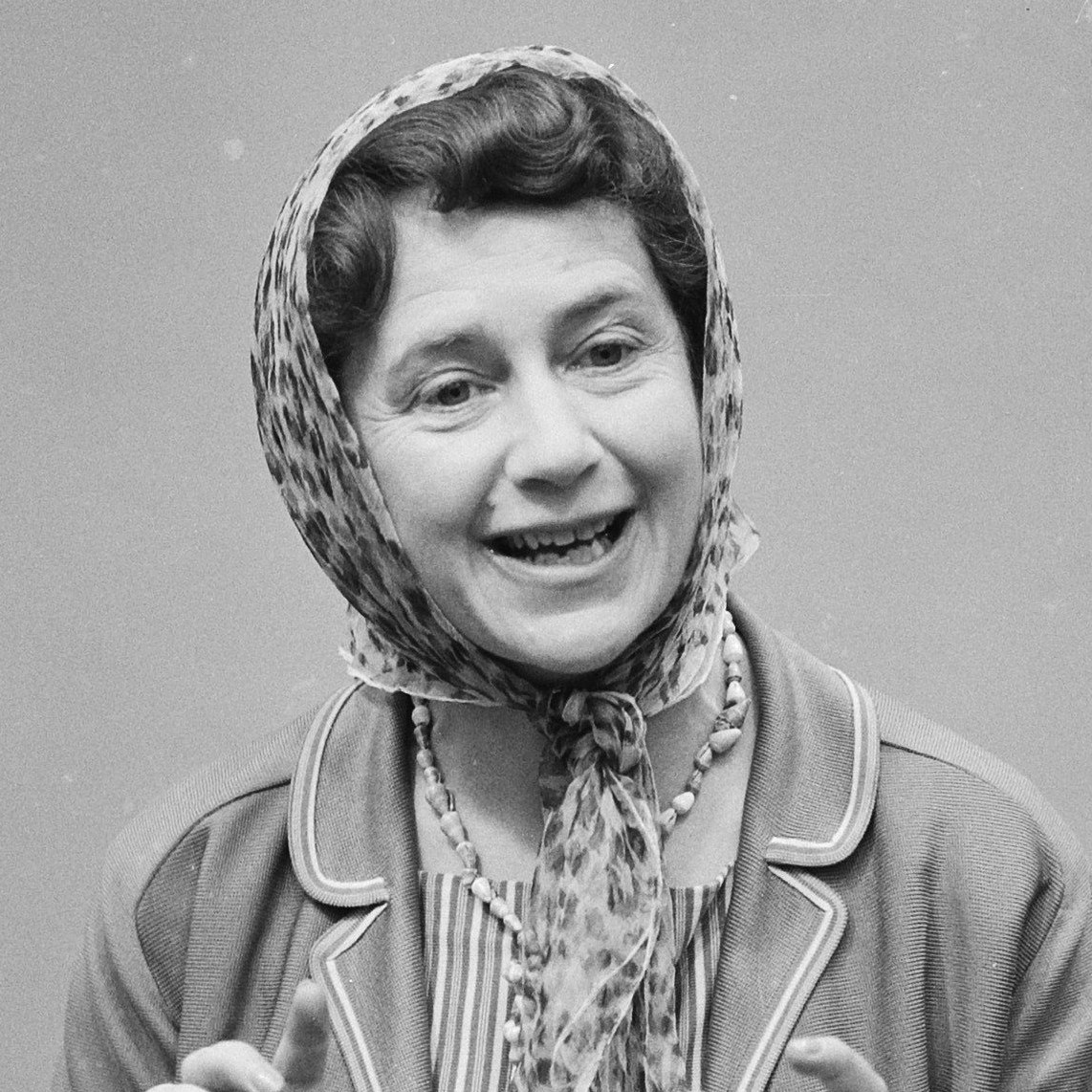
Peggy Ashcroft won for A Passage to India (1984); this category's oldest winner, at age 77.

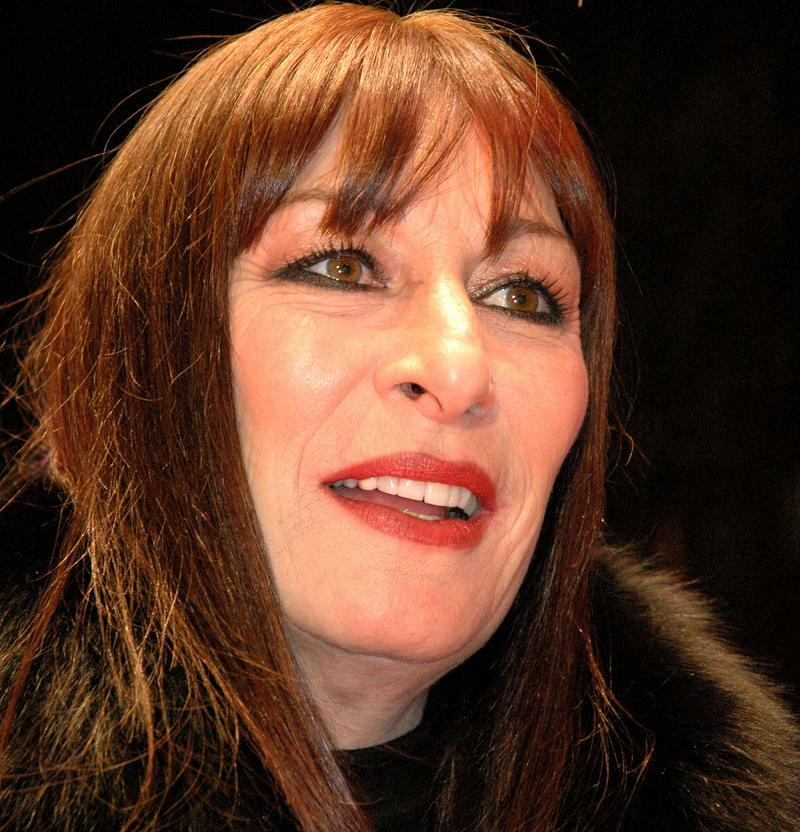
Anjelica Huston won for Prizzi's Honor (1985).

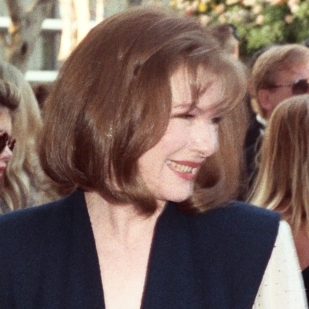
Dianne Wiest won twice, for Hannah and Her Sisters (1986) and Bullets Over Broadway (1994).

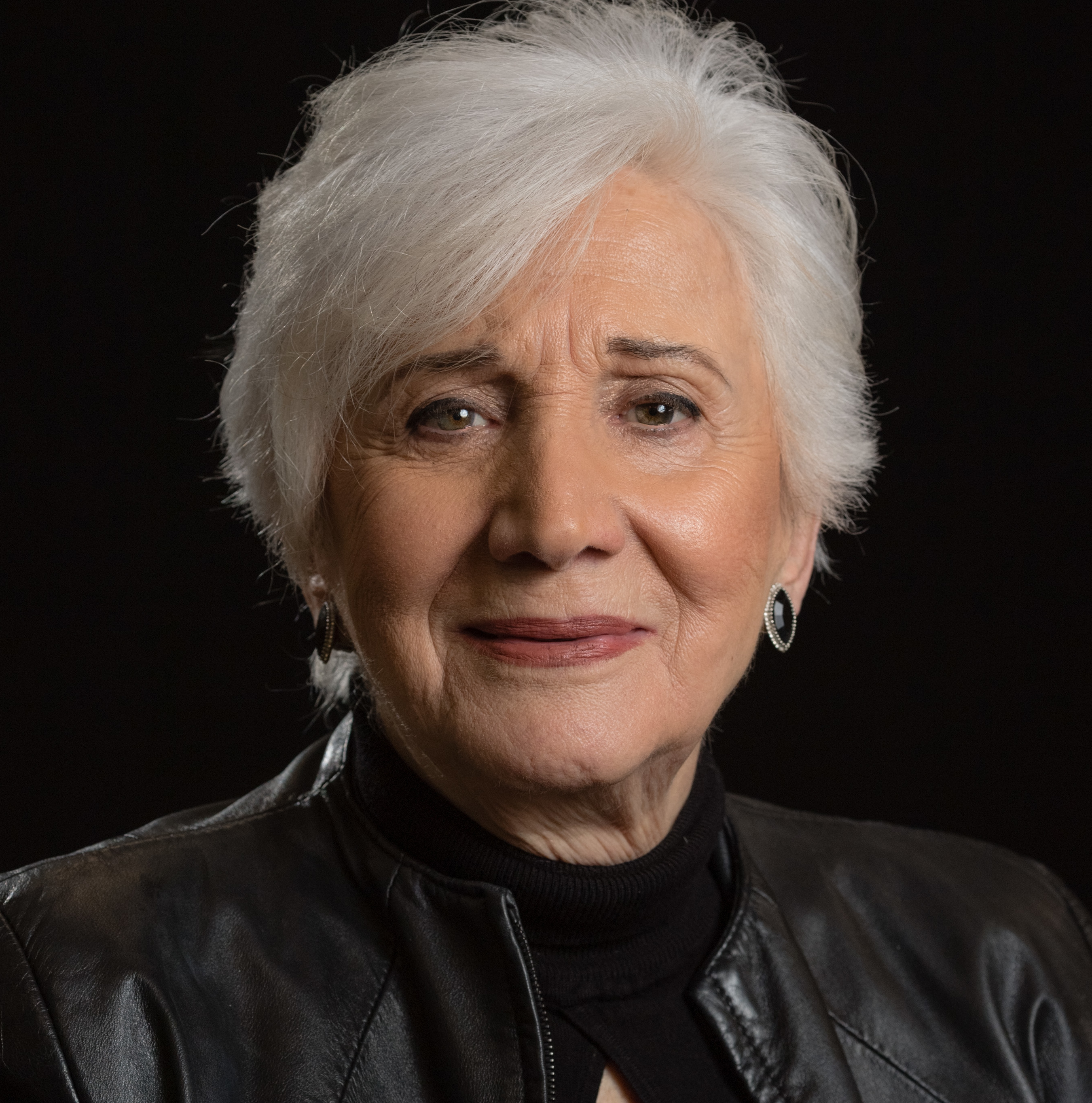
Olympia Dukakis won for Moonstruck (1987).

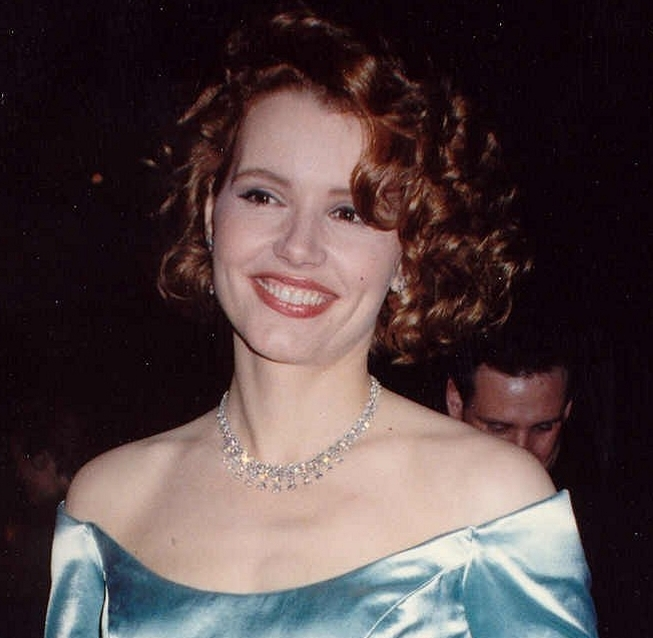
Geena Davis won for The Accidental Tourist (1988).

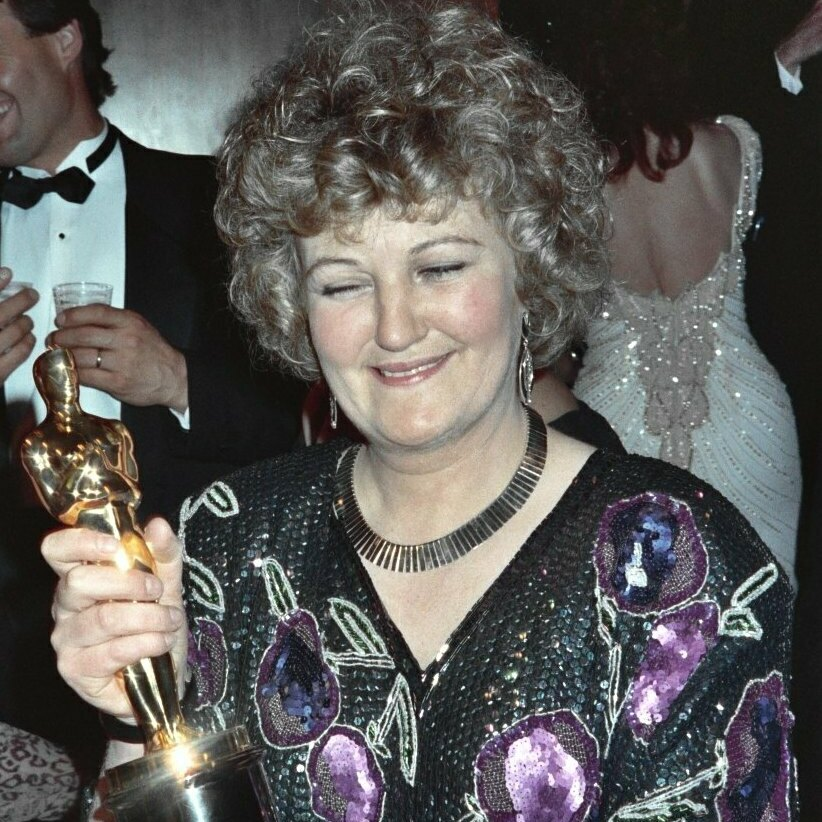
Brenda Fricker won for My Left Foot (1989).

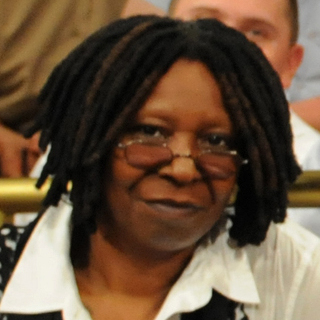
Whoopi Goldberg won for Ghost (1990).

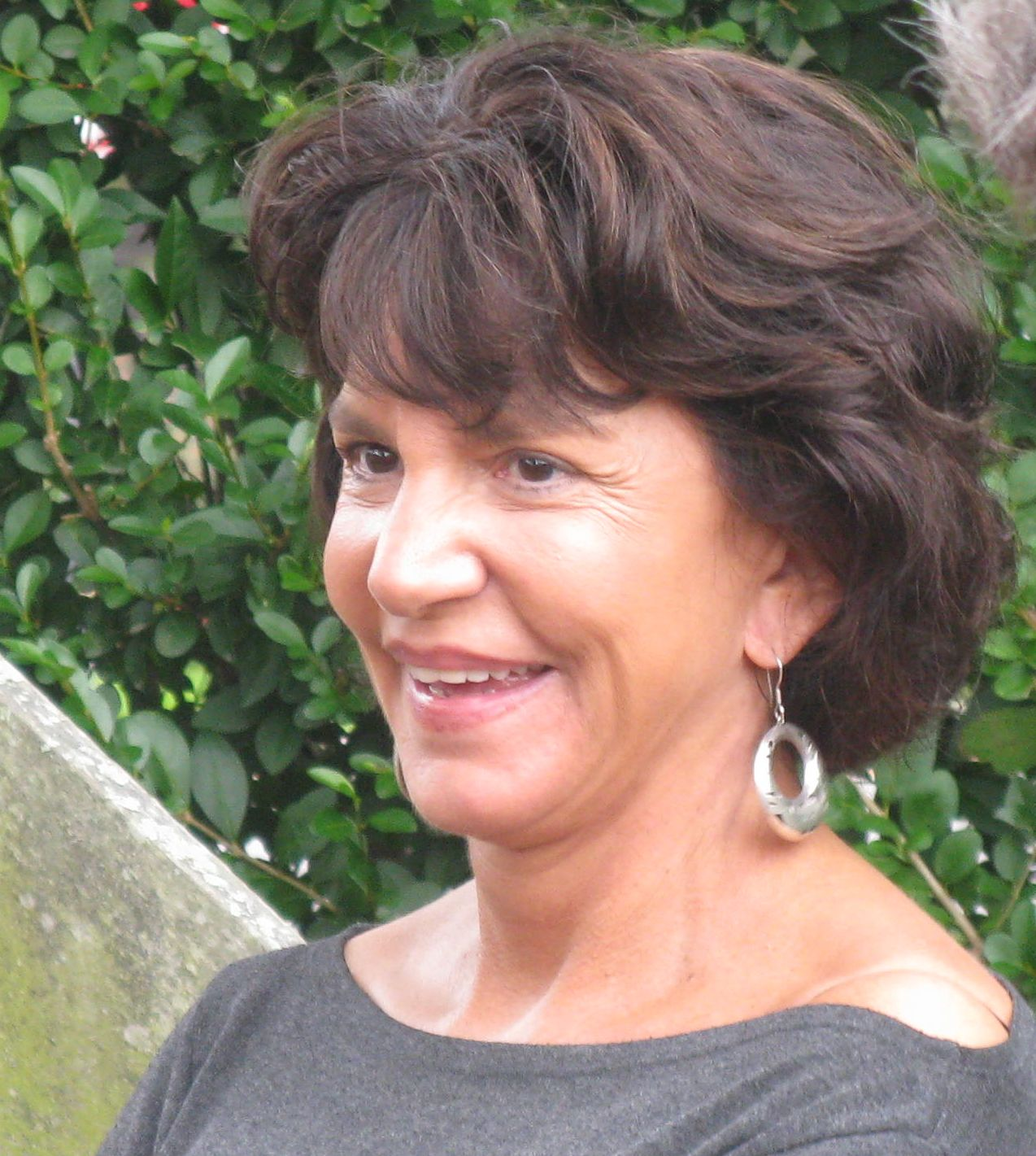
Mercedes Ruehl won for The Fisher King (1991).

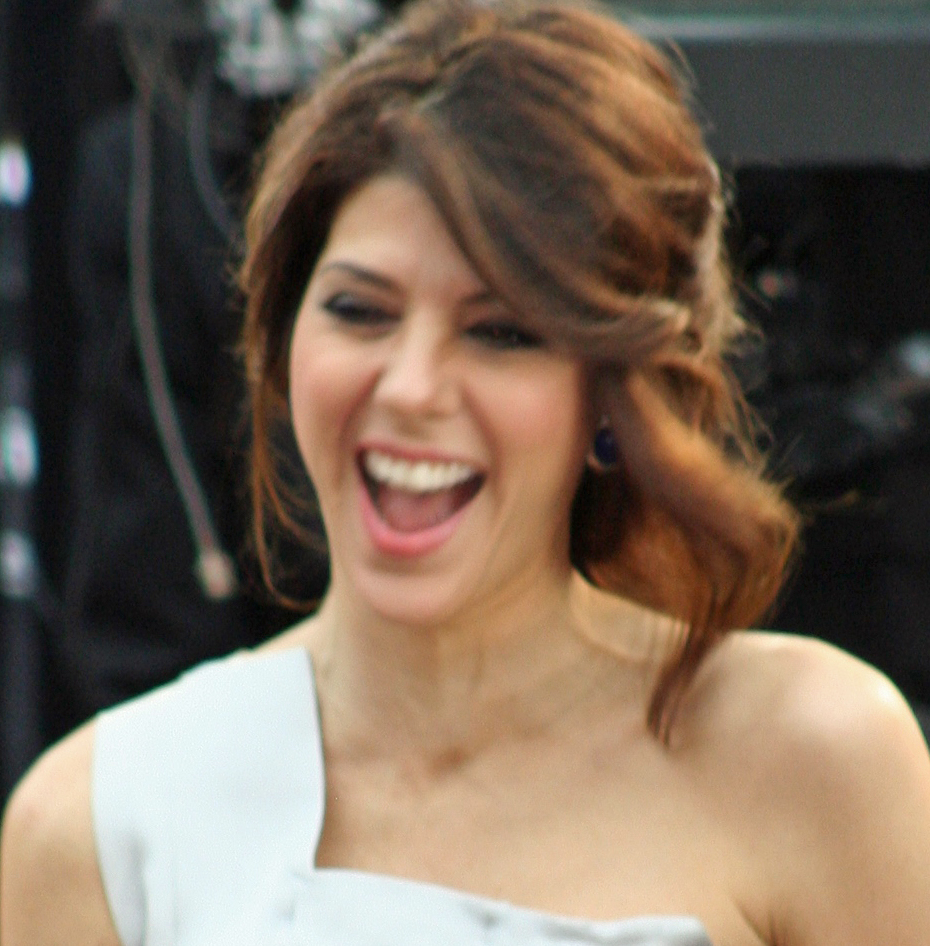
Marisa Tomei won for My Cousin Vinny (1992).

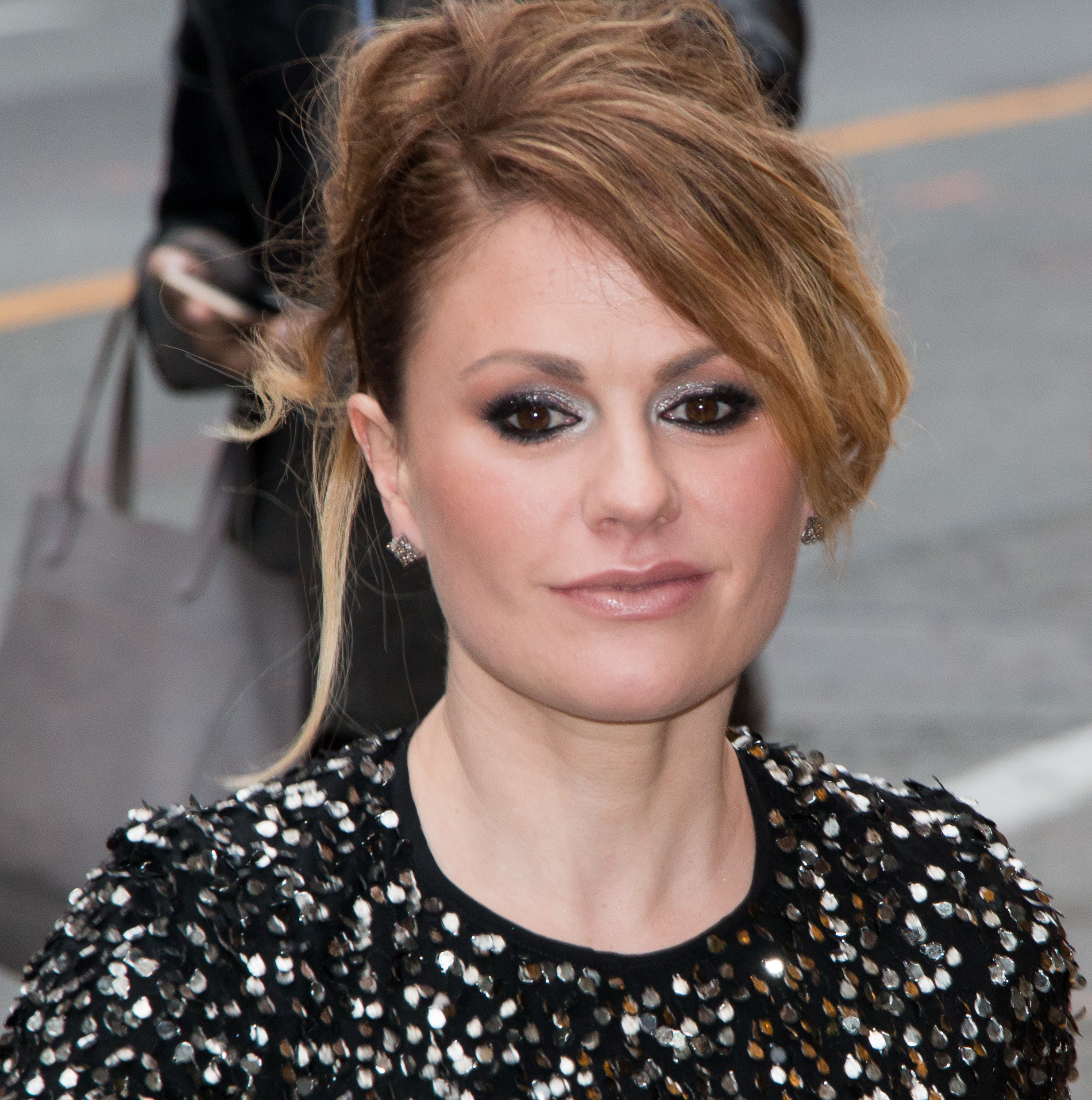
Anna Paquin won for The Piano (1993).

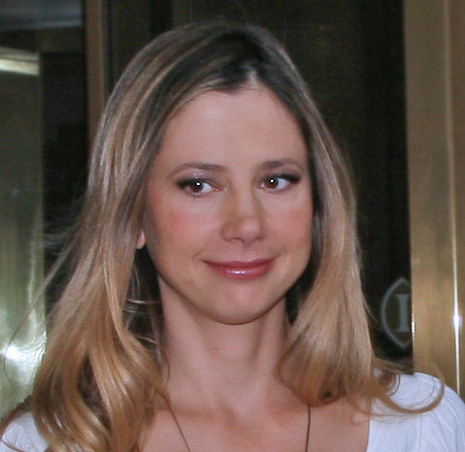
Mira Sorvino won for Mighty Aphrodite (1995).

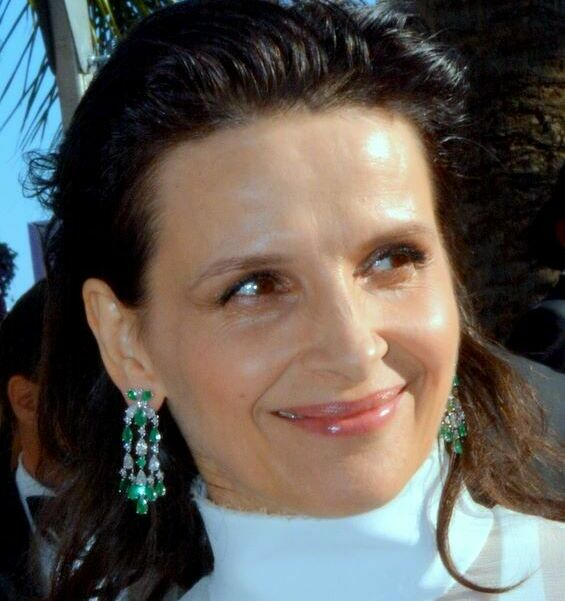
Juliette Binoche won for The English Patient (1996).

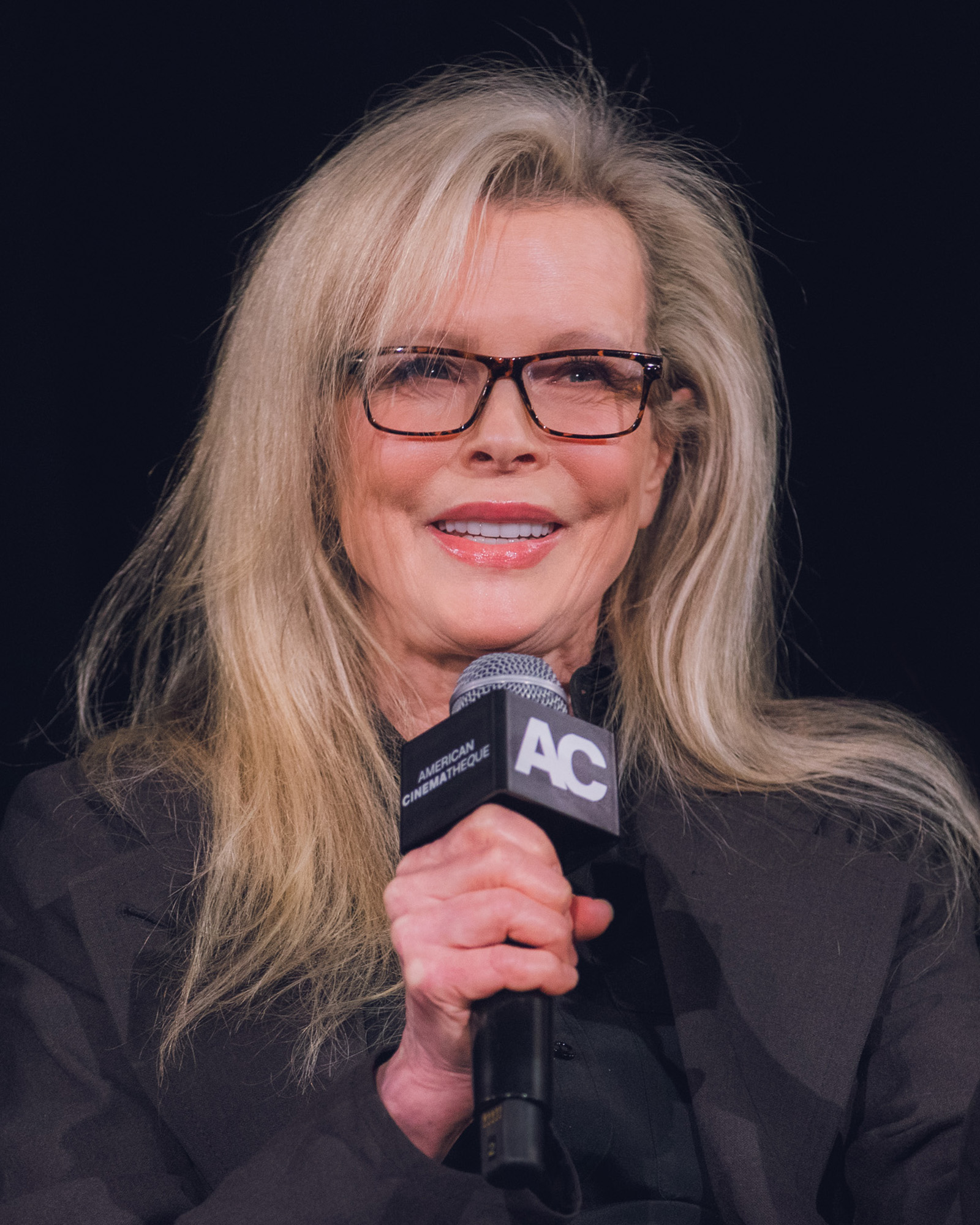
Kim Basinger won for L.A. Confidential (1997).

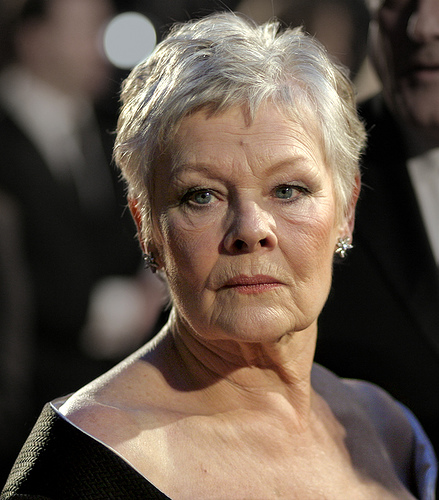
Judi Dench won for Shakespeare in Love (1998).

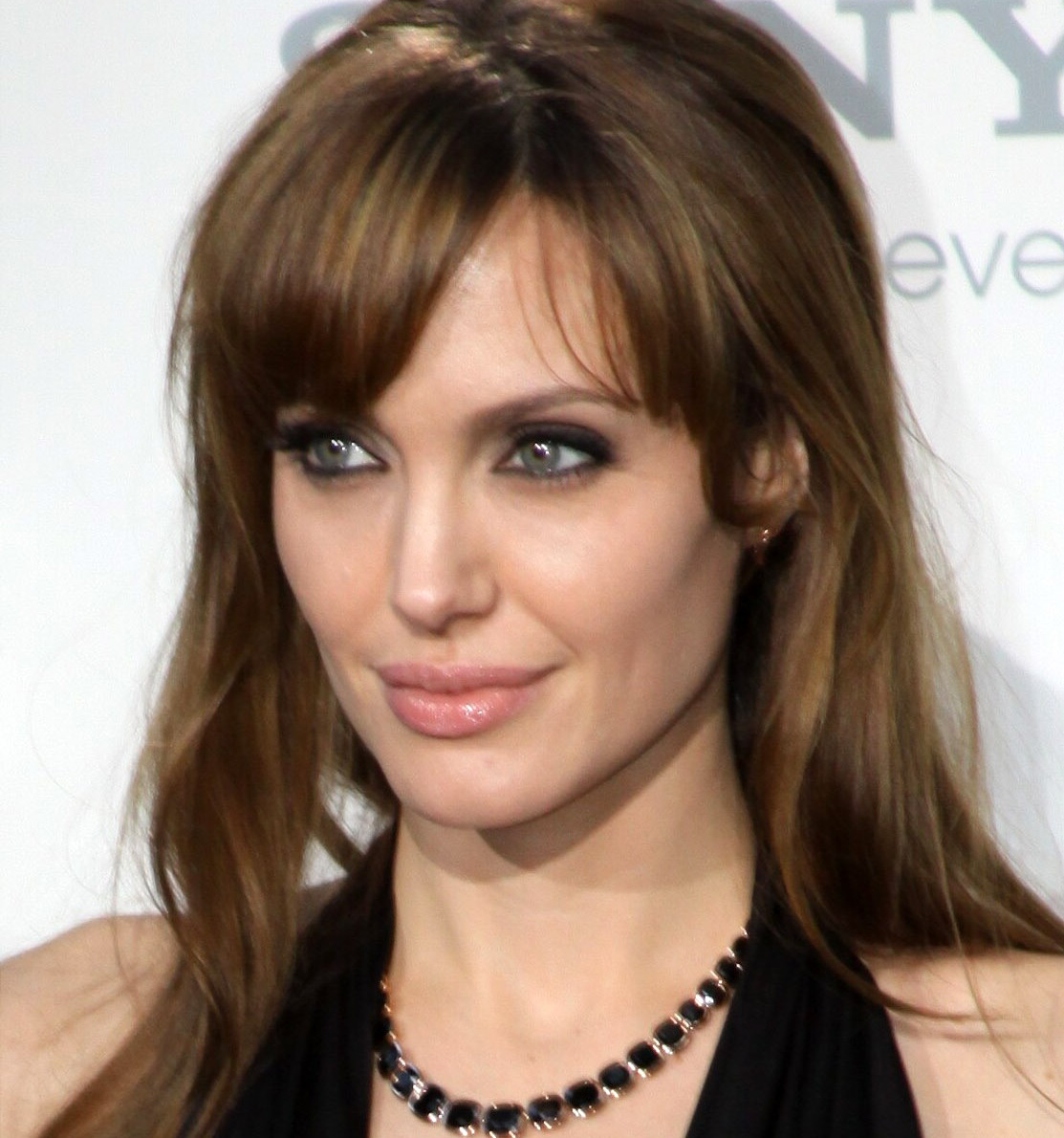
Angelina Jolie won for Girl, Interrupted (1999).

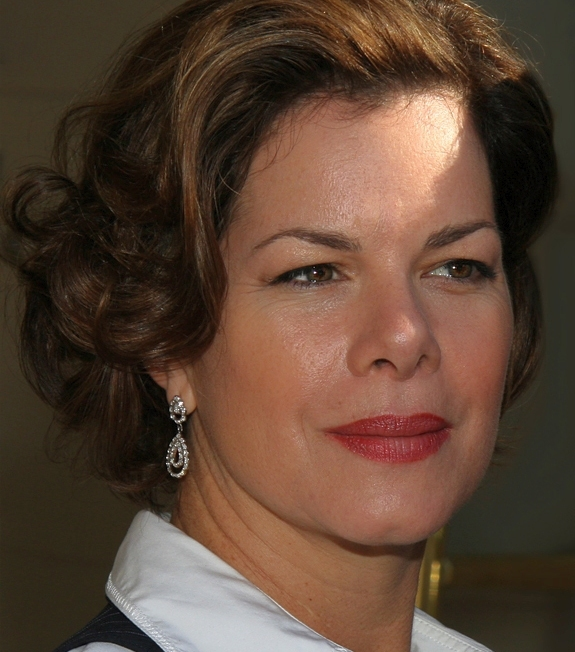
Marcia Gay Harden won for Pollock (2000).

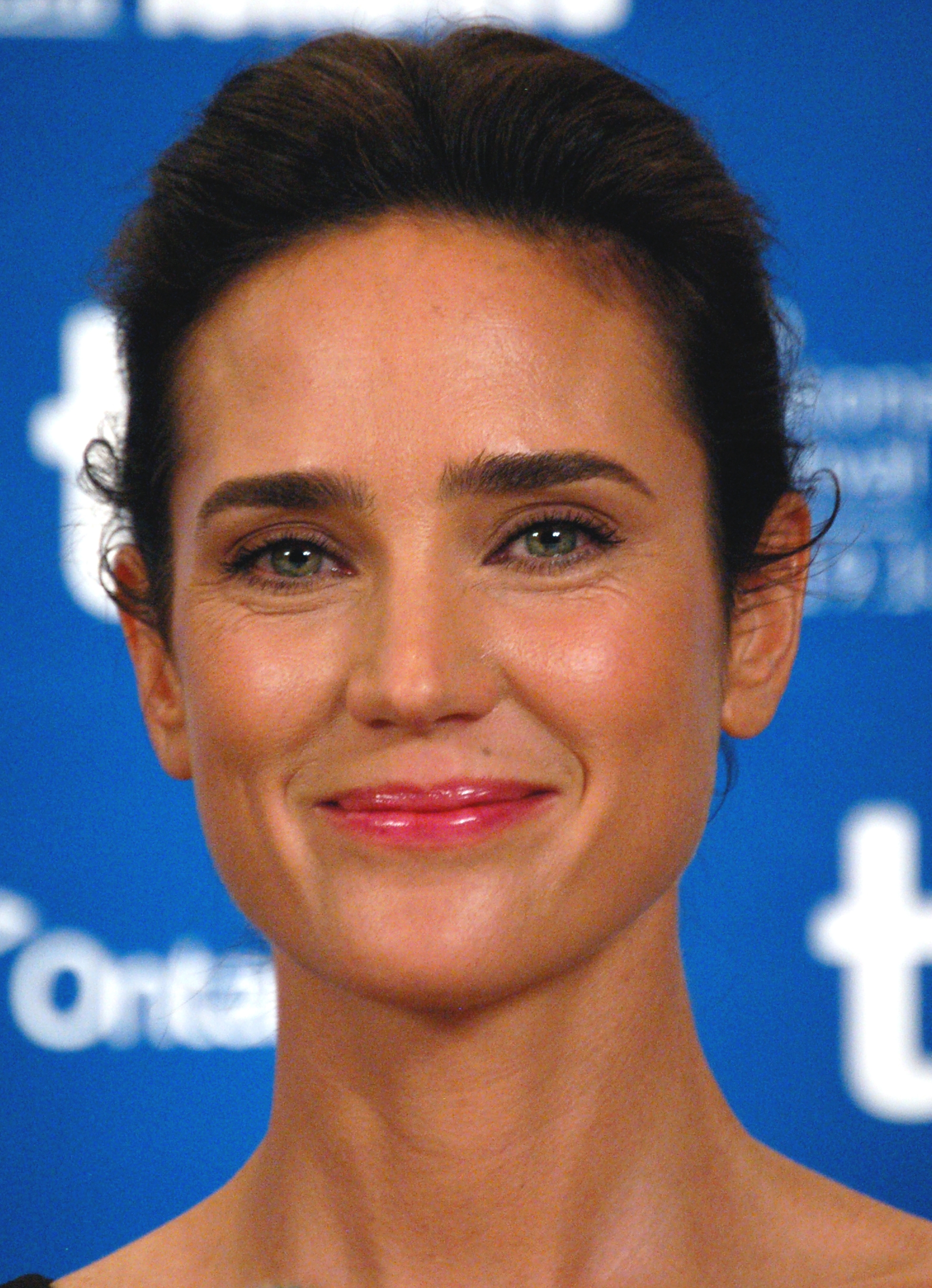
Jennifer Connelly won for A Beautiful Mind (2001).

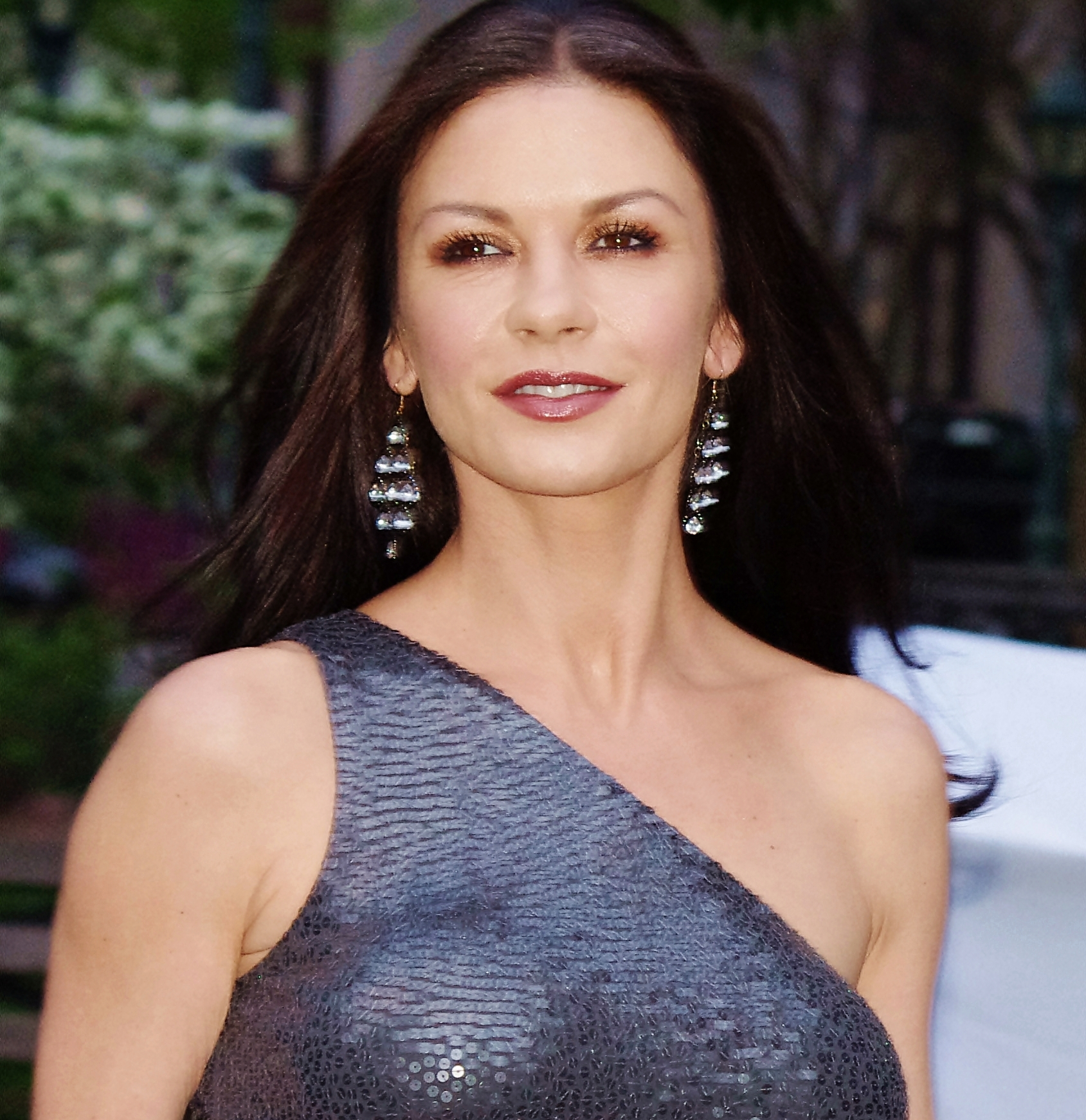
Catherine Zeta-Jones won for Chicago (2002).

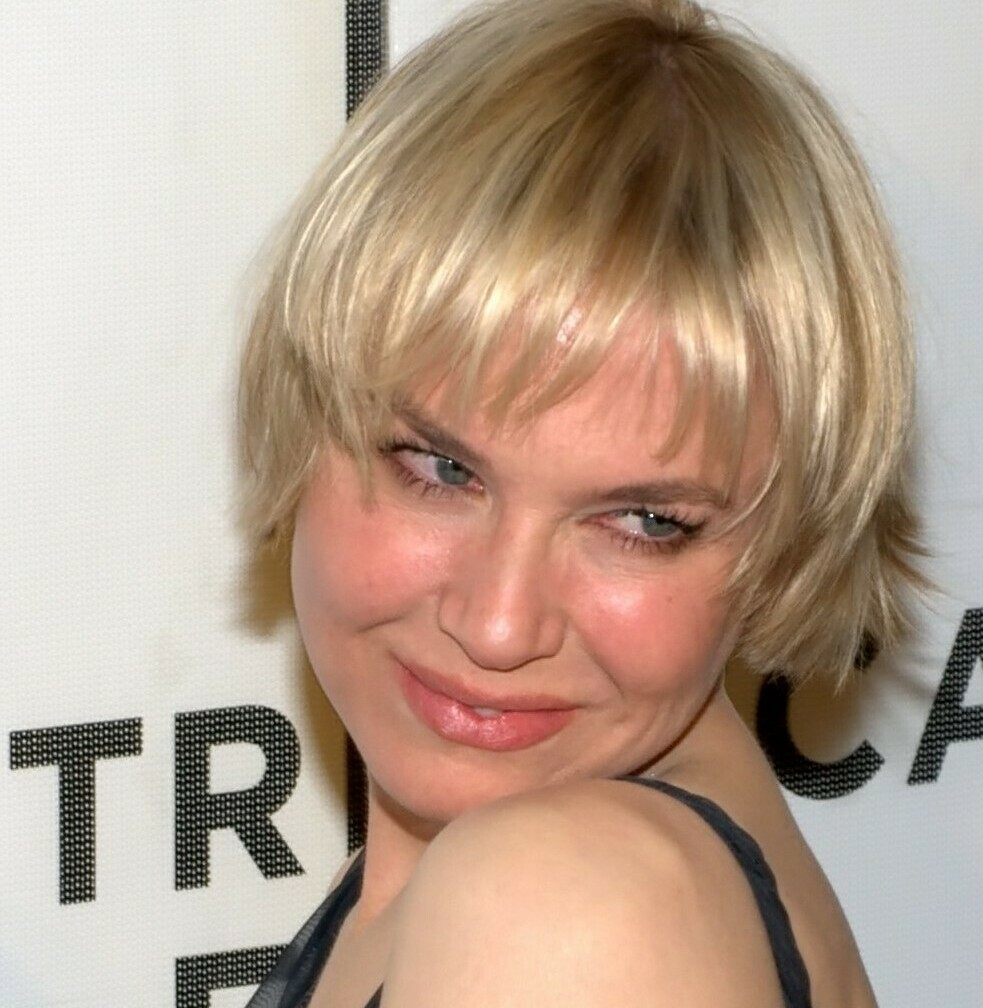
Renée Zellweger won for Cold Mountain (2003).

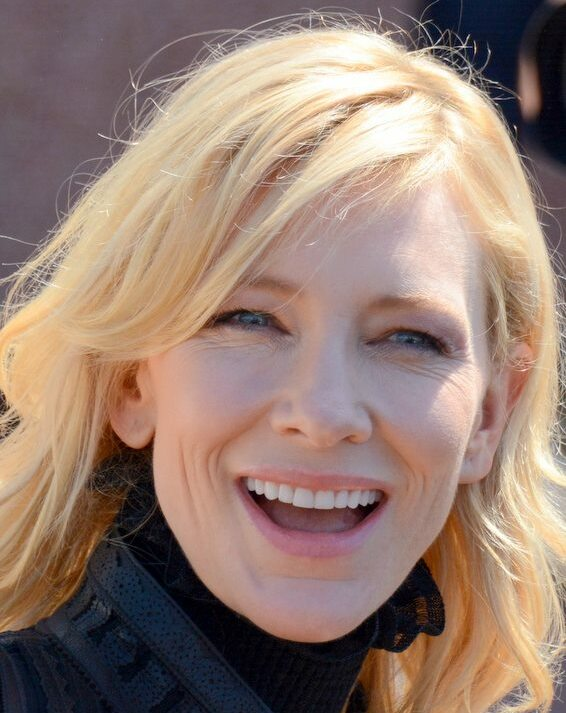
Cate Blanchett won for The Aviator (2004).

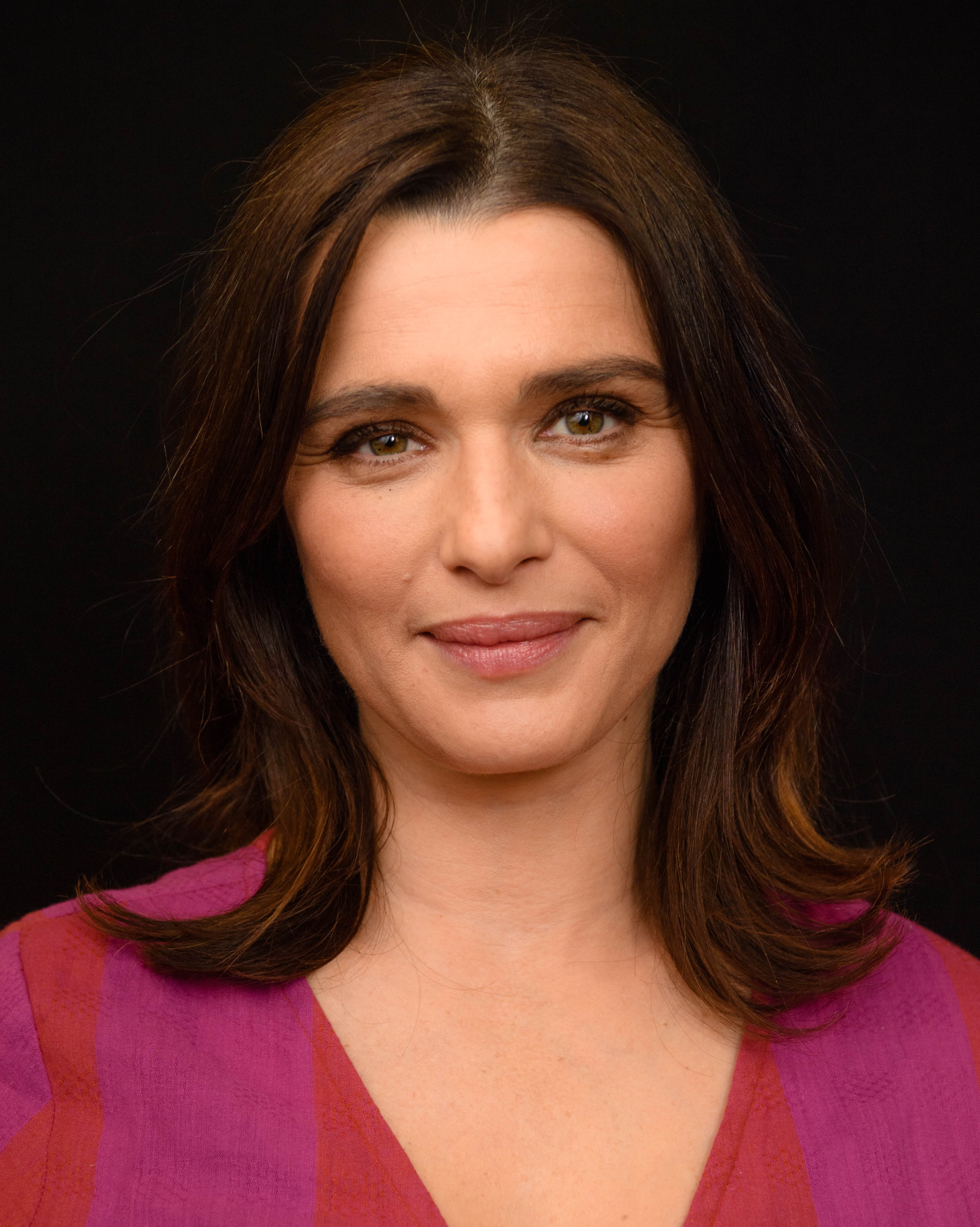
Rachel Weisz won for The Constant Gardener (2005).

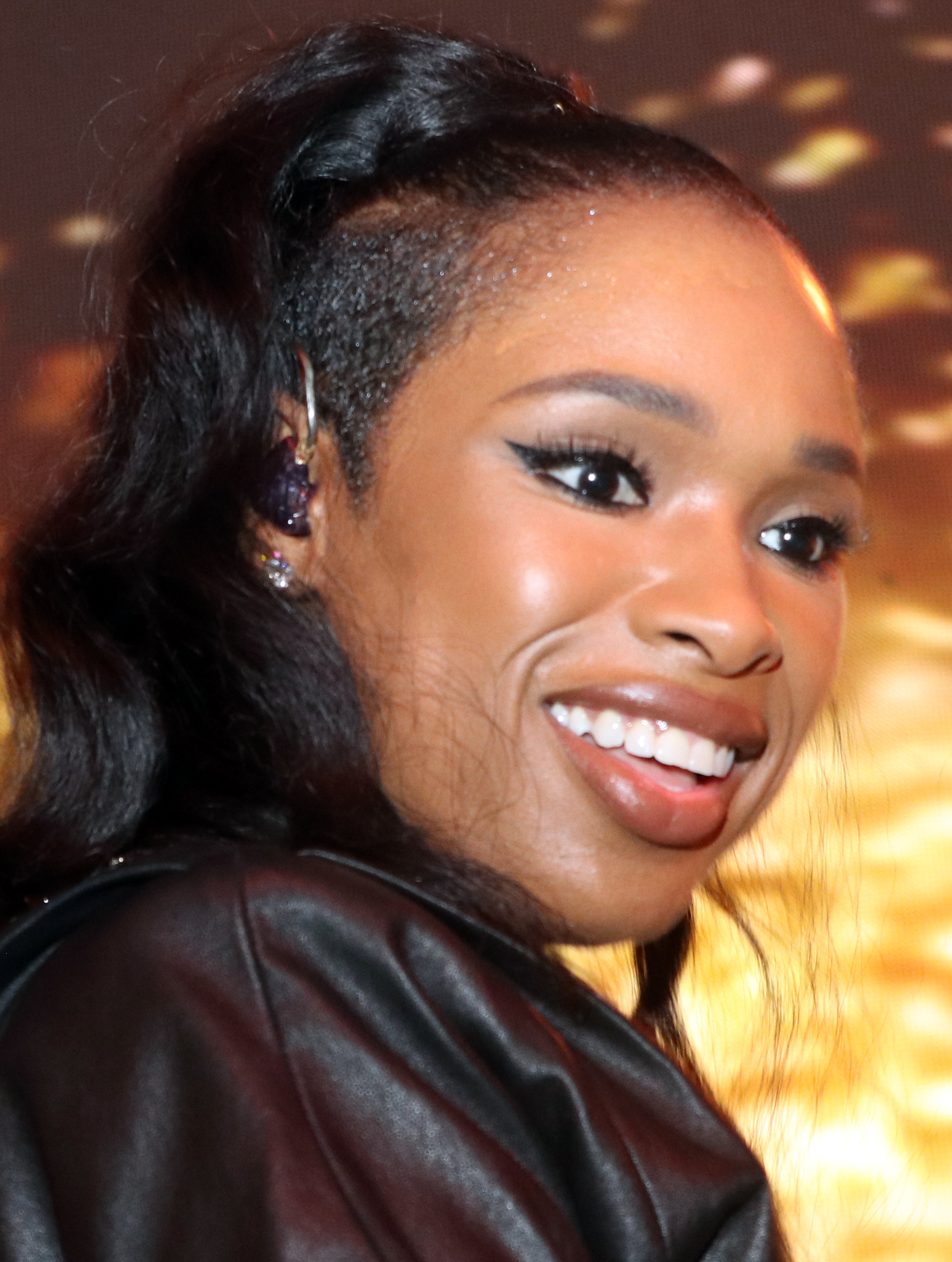
Jennifer Hudson won for Dreamgirls (2006).

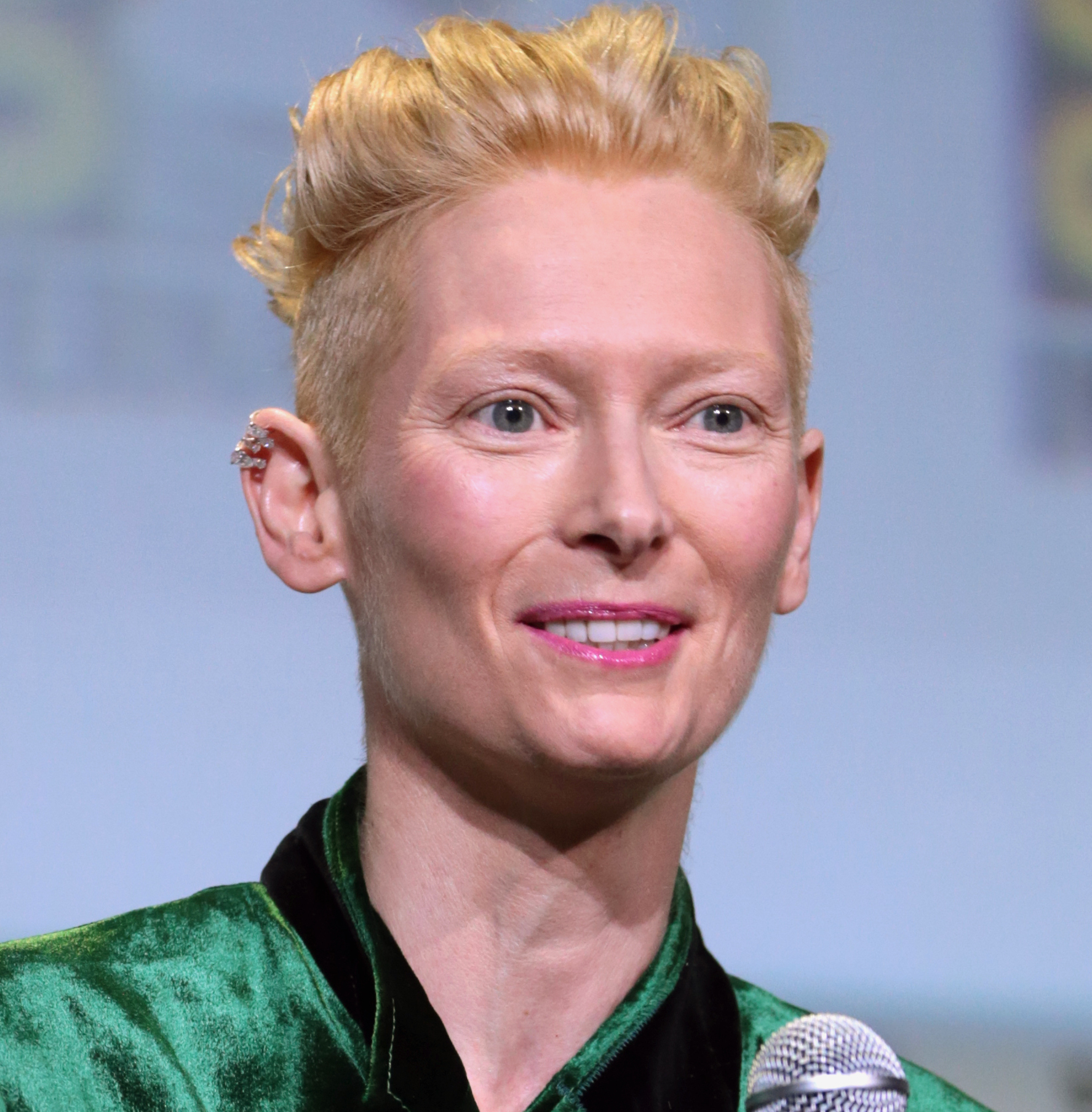
Tilda Swinton won for Michael Clayton (2007).

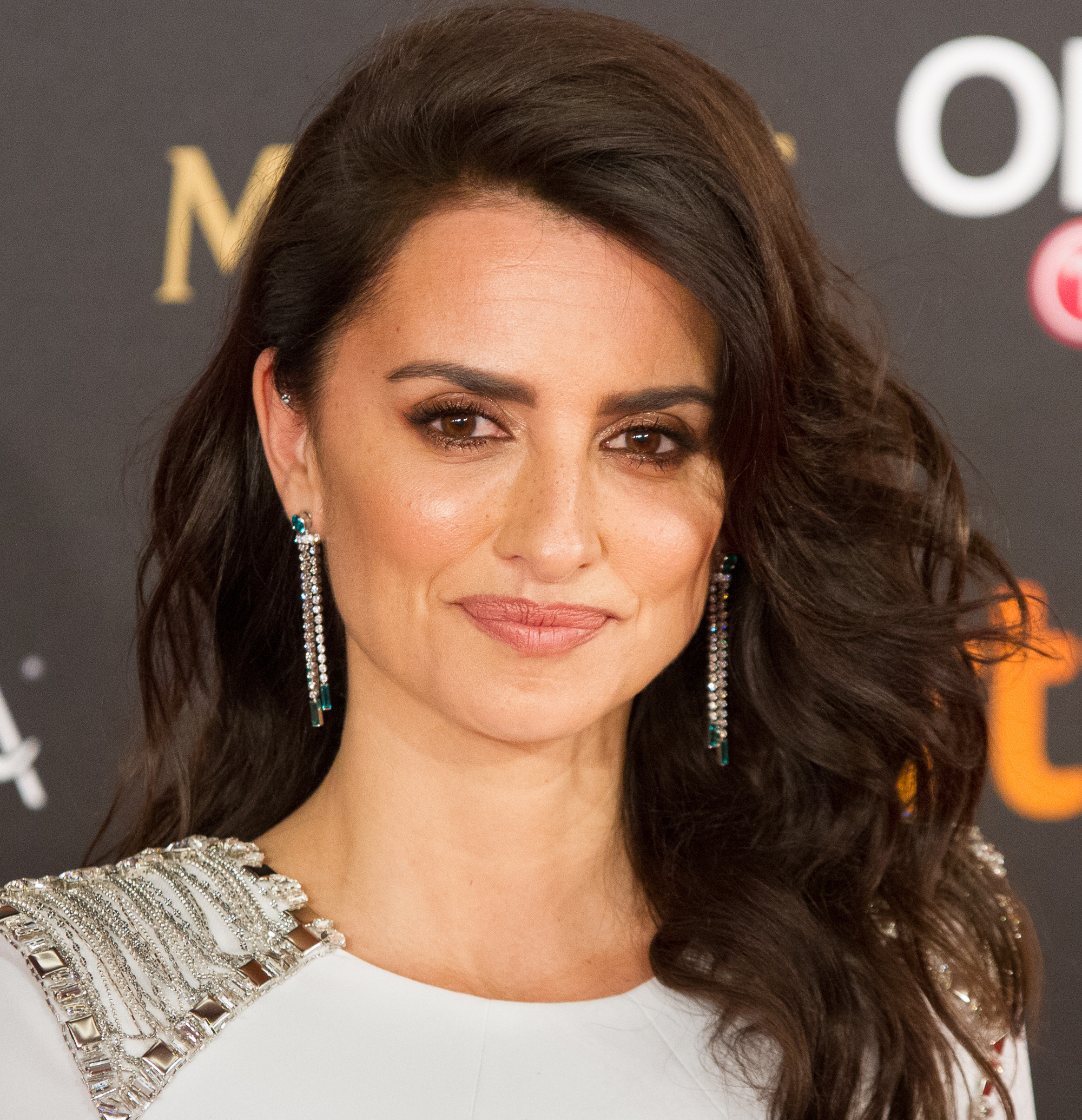
Penélope Cruz won for Vicky Cristina Barcelona (2008).

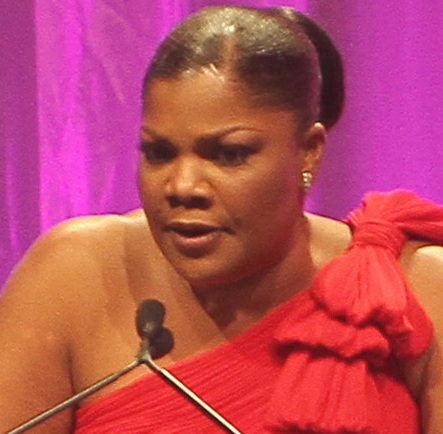
Mo'Nique won for Precious (2009).

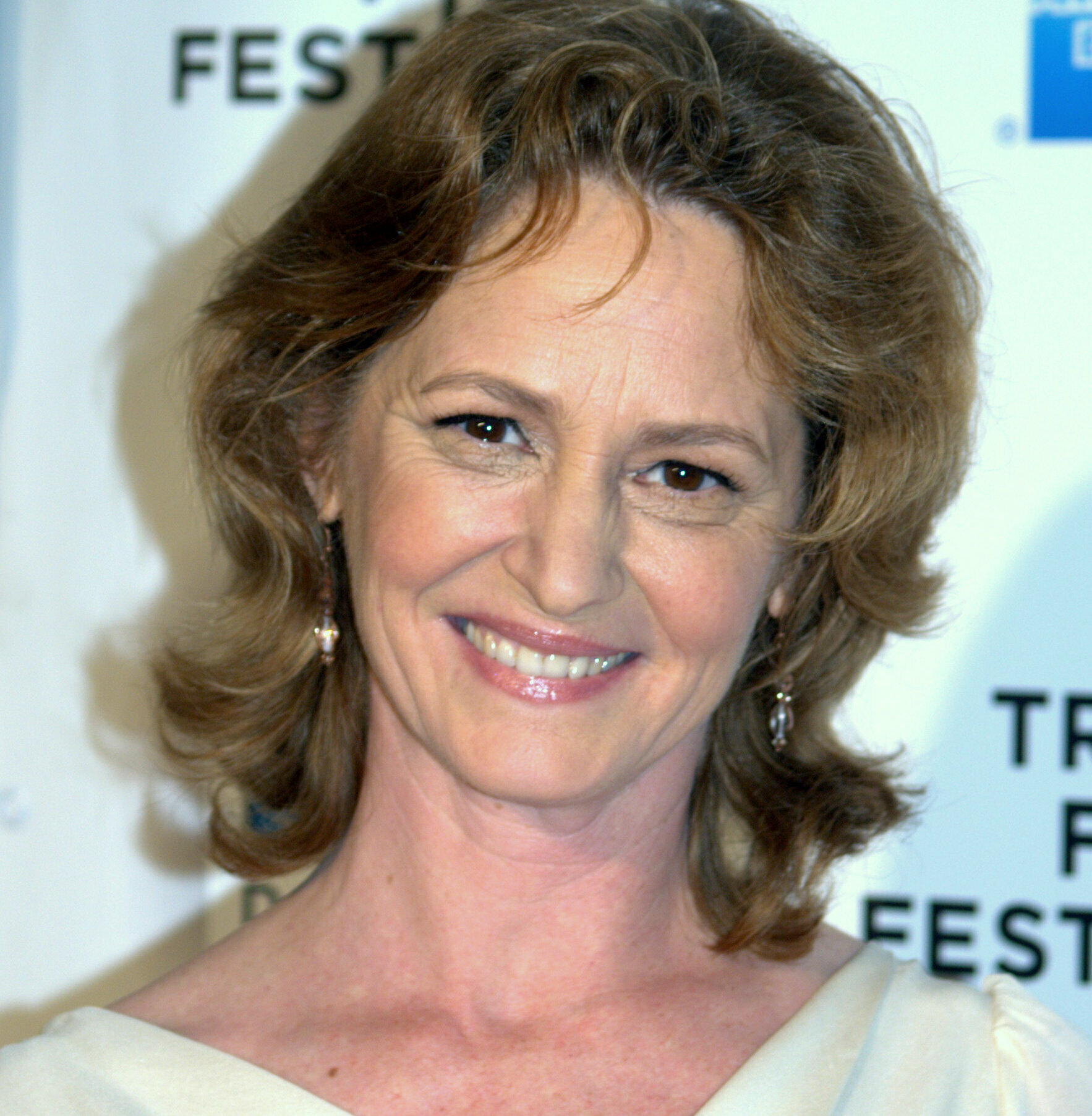
Melissa Leo won for The Fighter (2010).

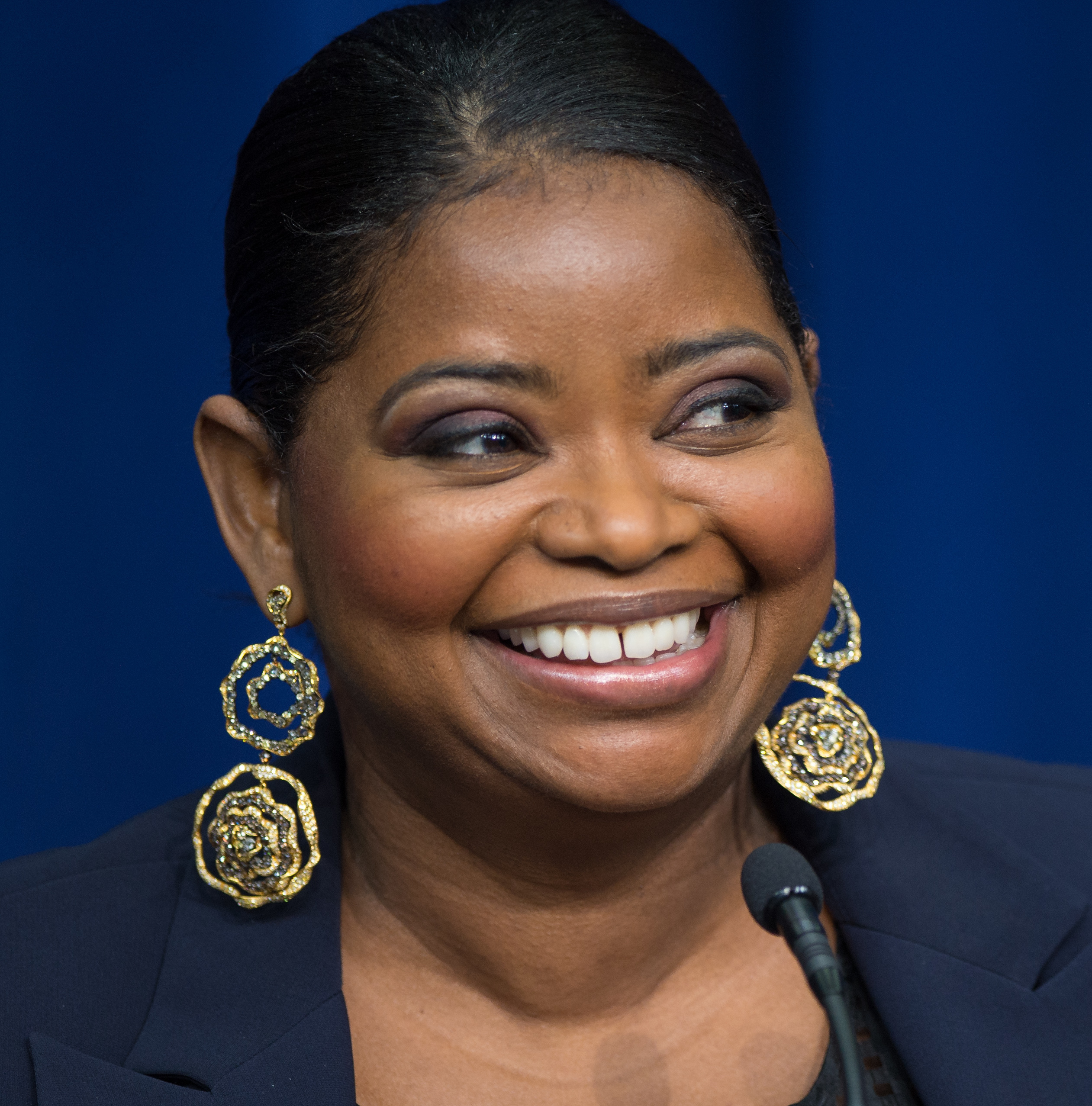
Octavia Spencer won for The Help (2011).

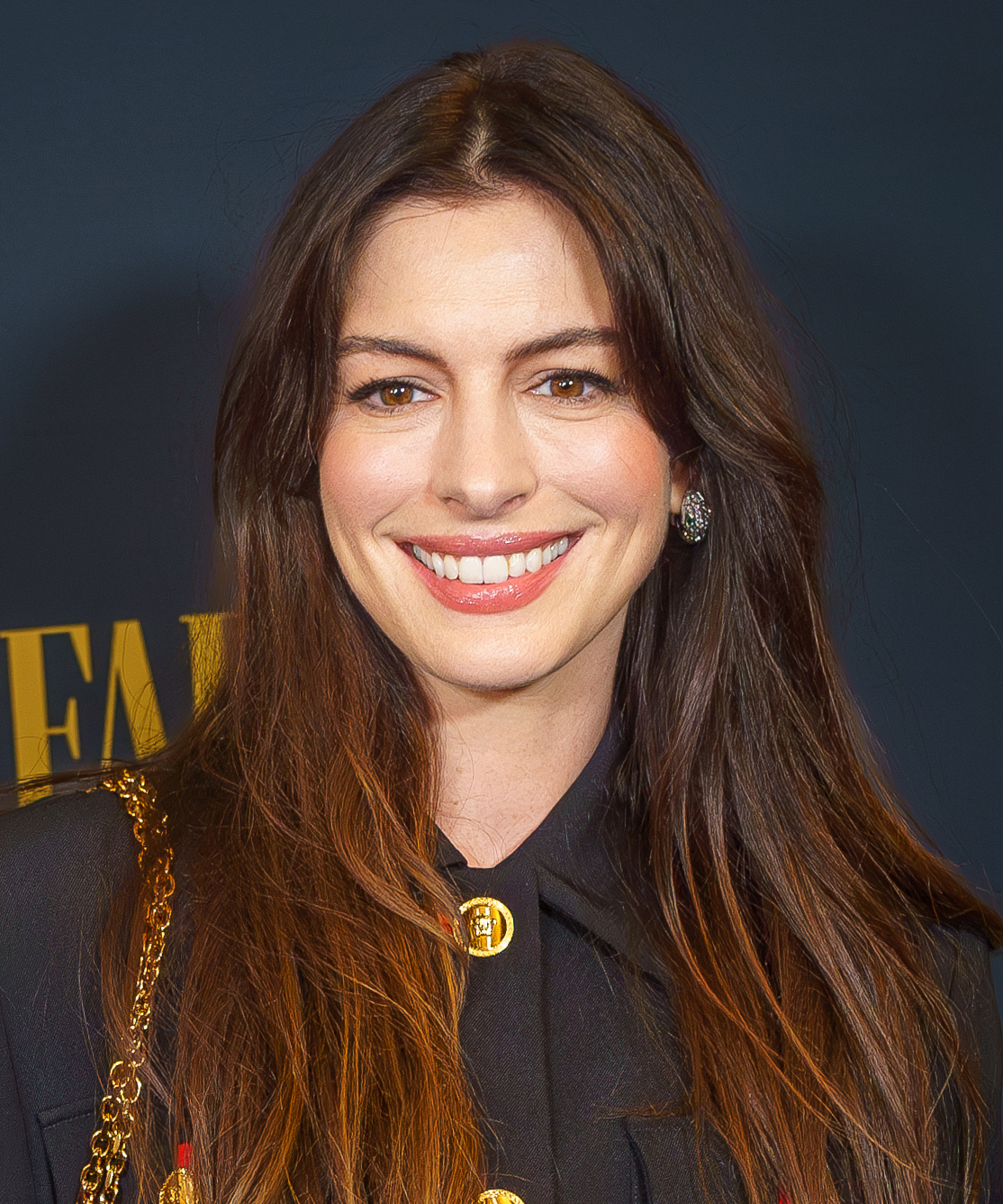
Anne Hathaway won for Les Misérables (2012).

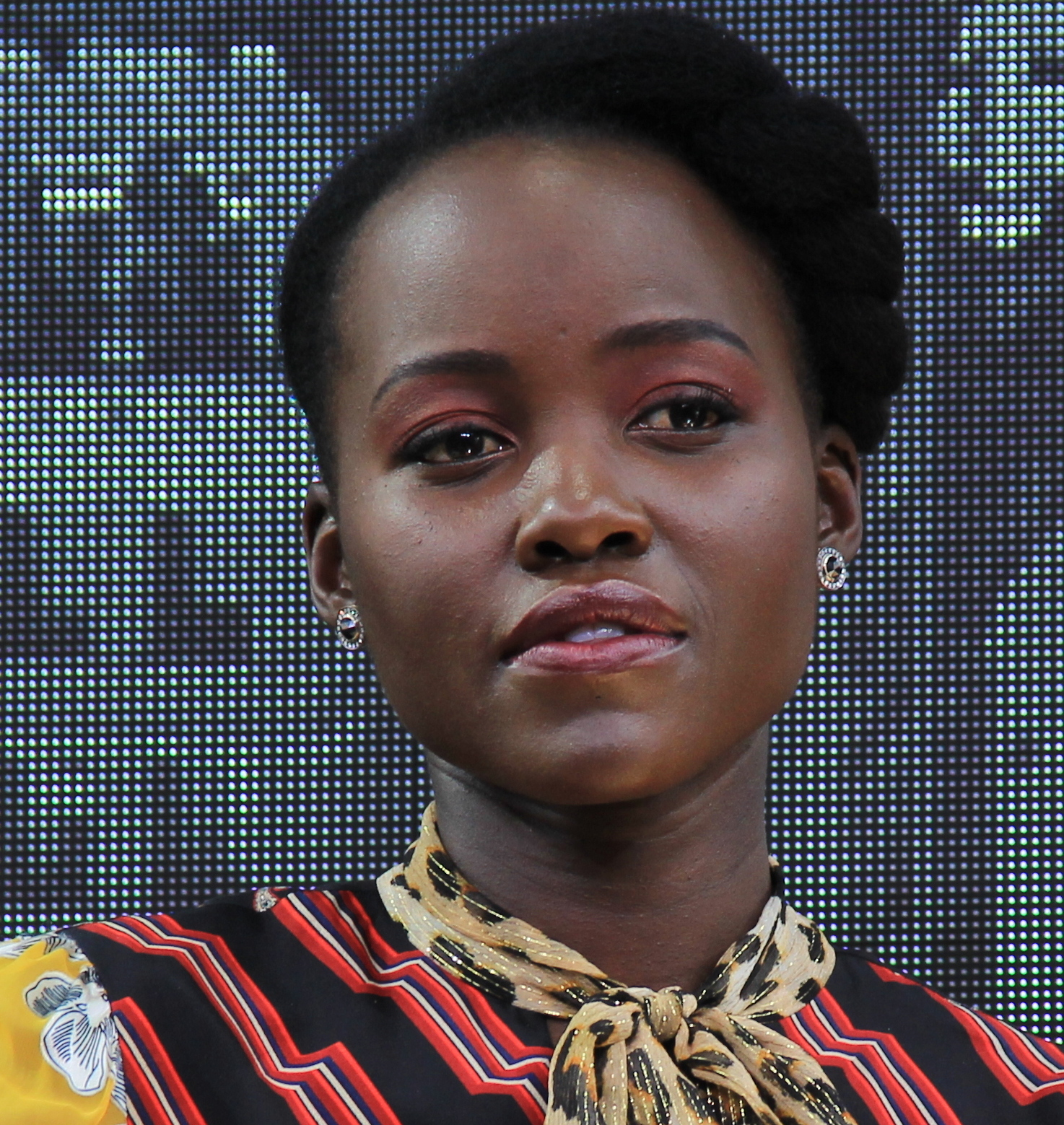
Lupita Nyong'o won for 12 Years a Slave (2013).

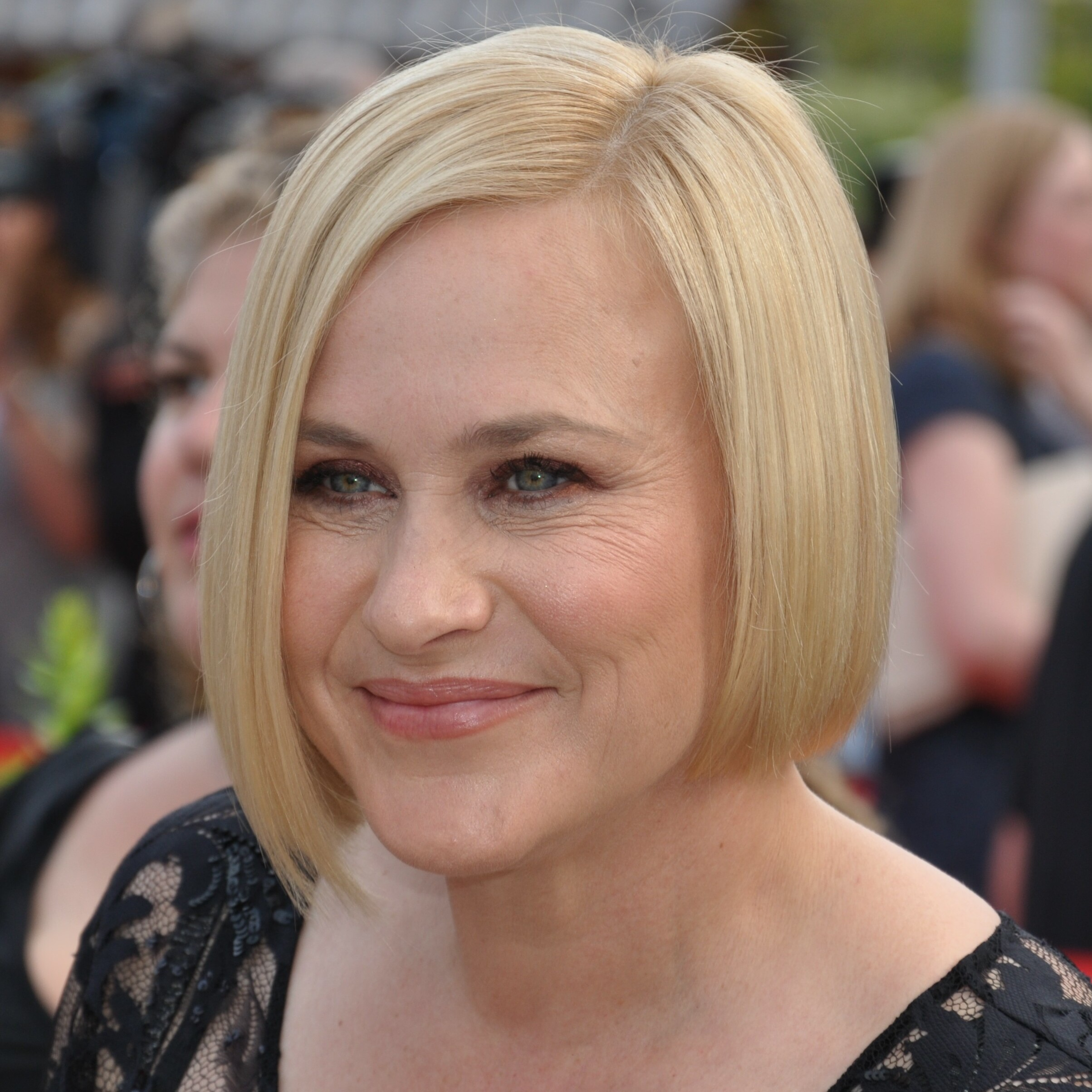
Patricia Arquette won for Boyhood (2014).

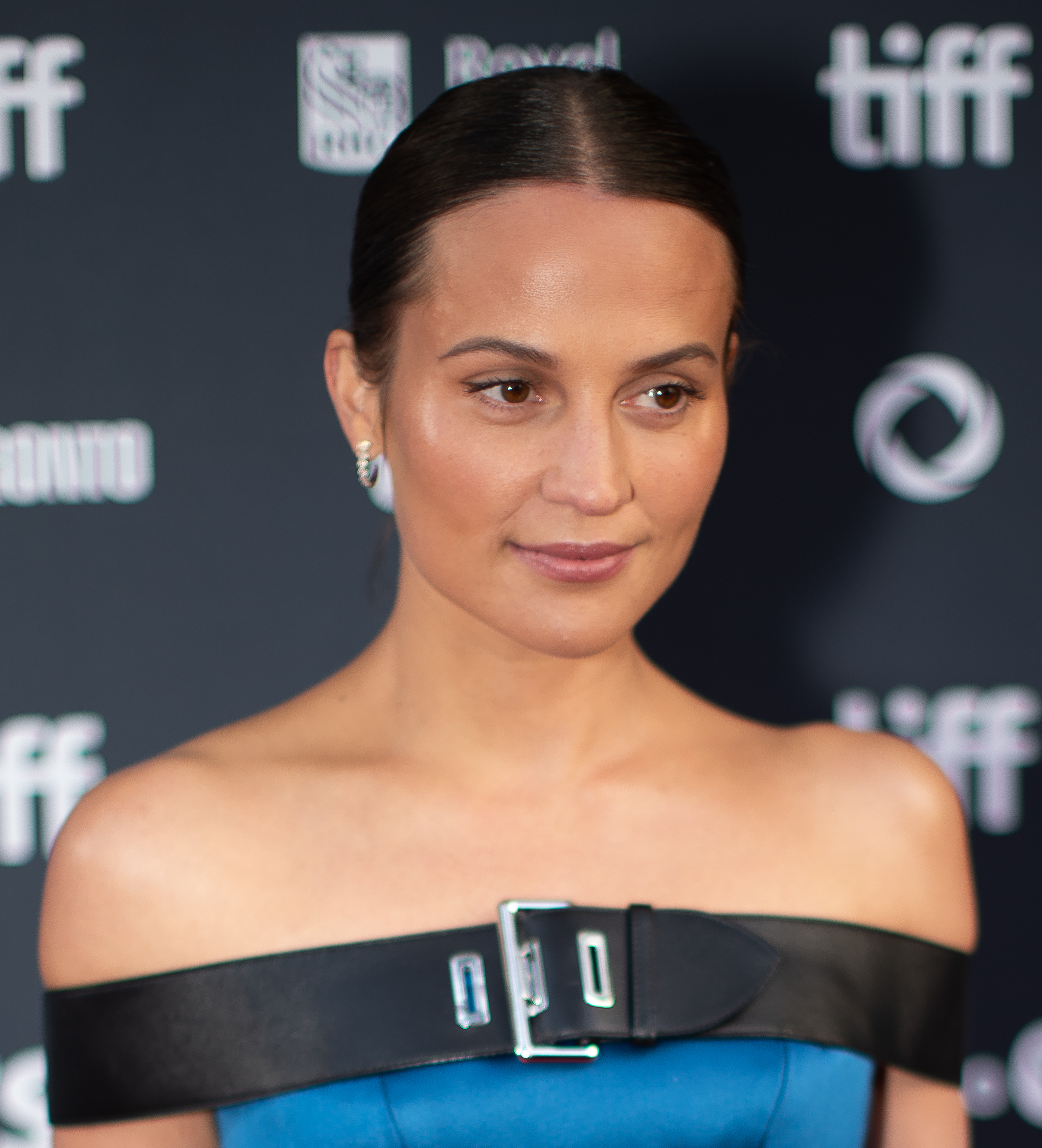
Alicia Vikander won for The Danish Girl (2015).

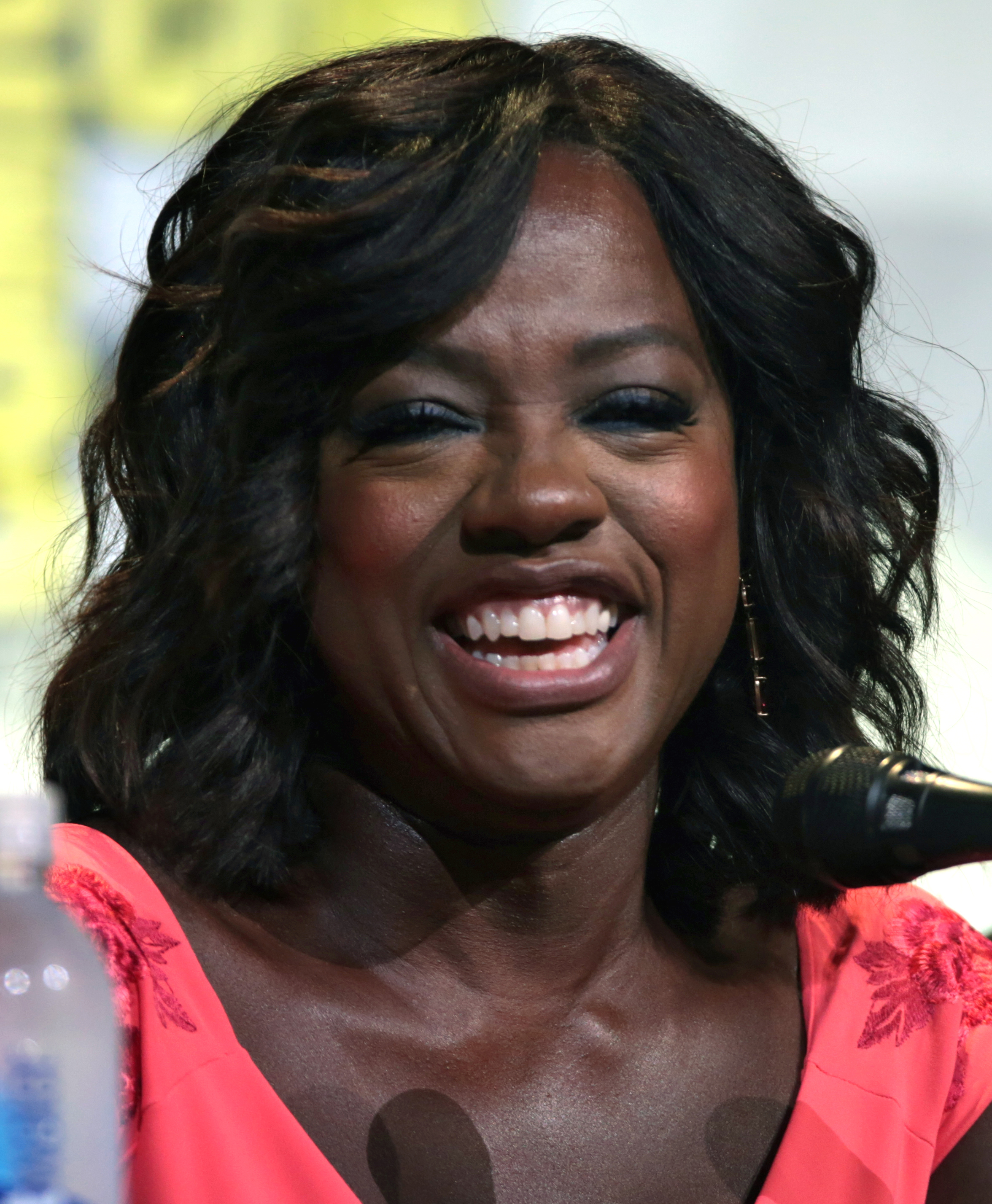
Viola Davis won for Fences (2016).

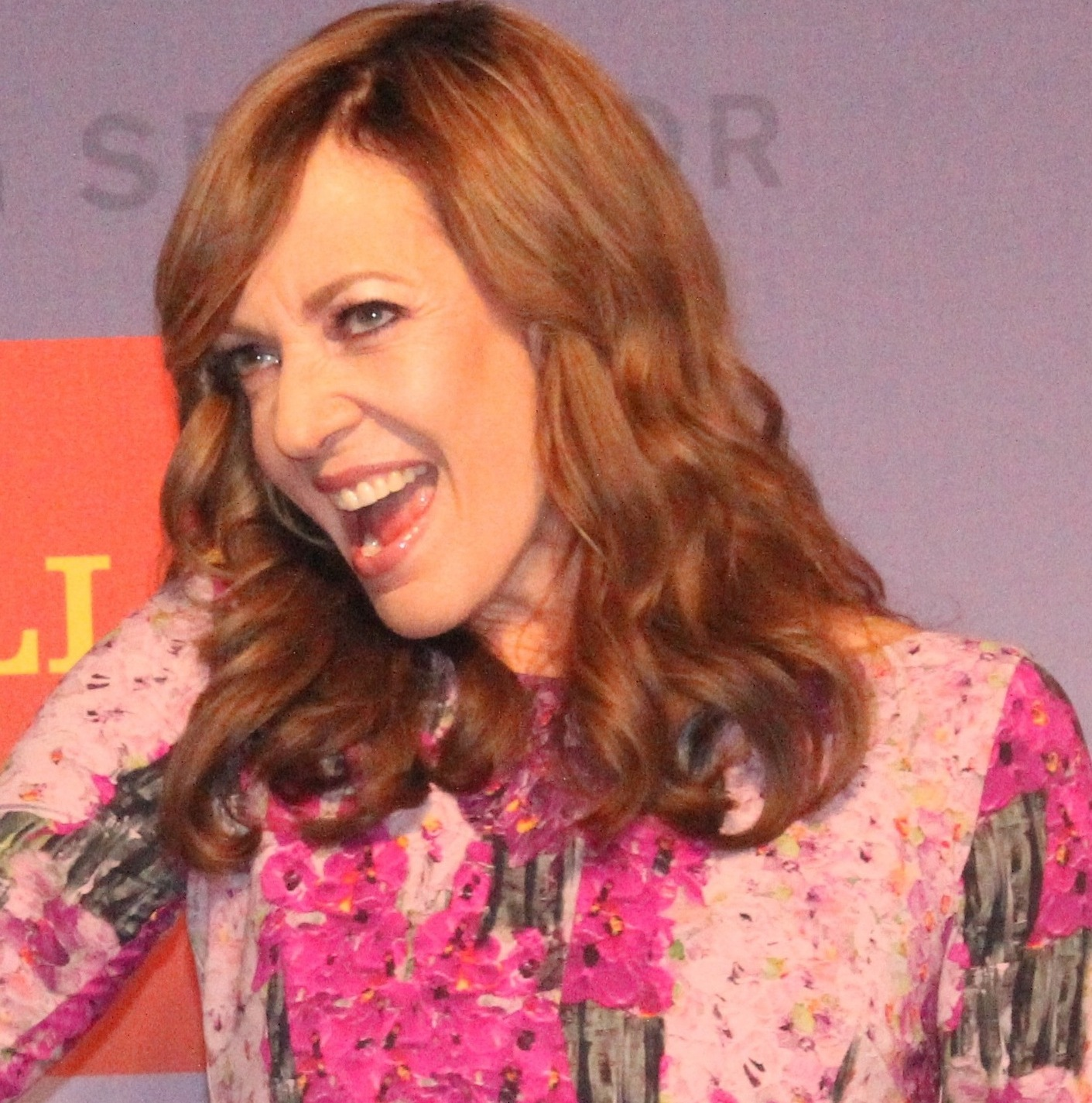
Allison Janney won for I, Tonya (2017).

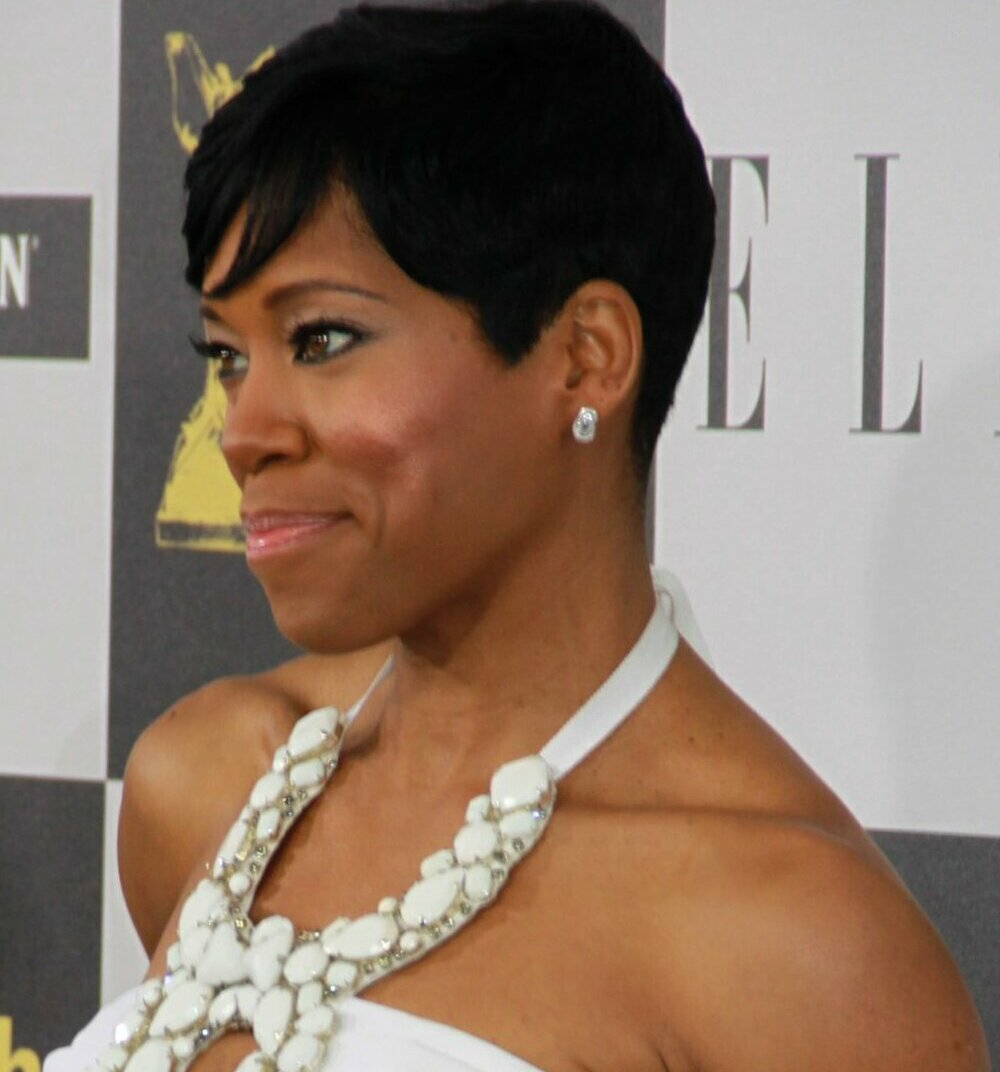
Regina King won for If Beale Street Could Talk (2018).

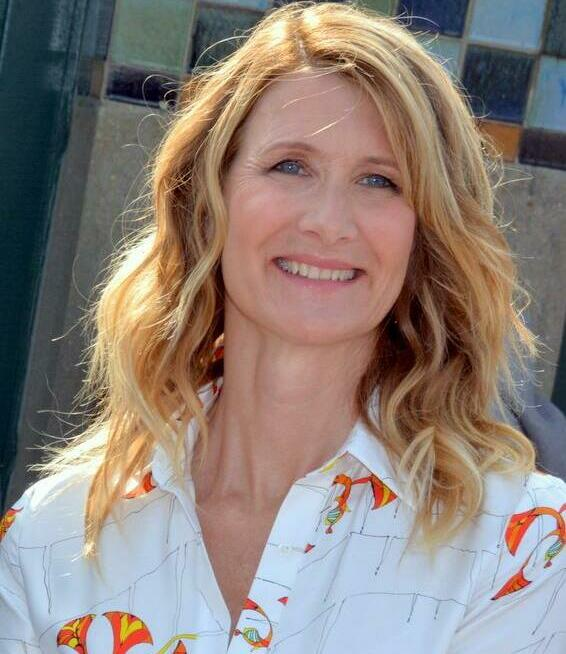
Laura Dern won for Marriage Story (2019).

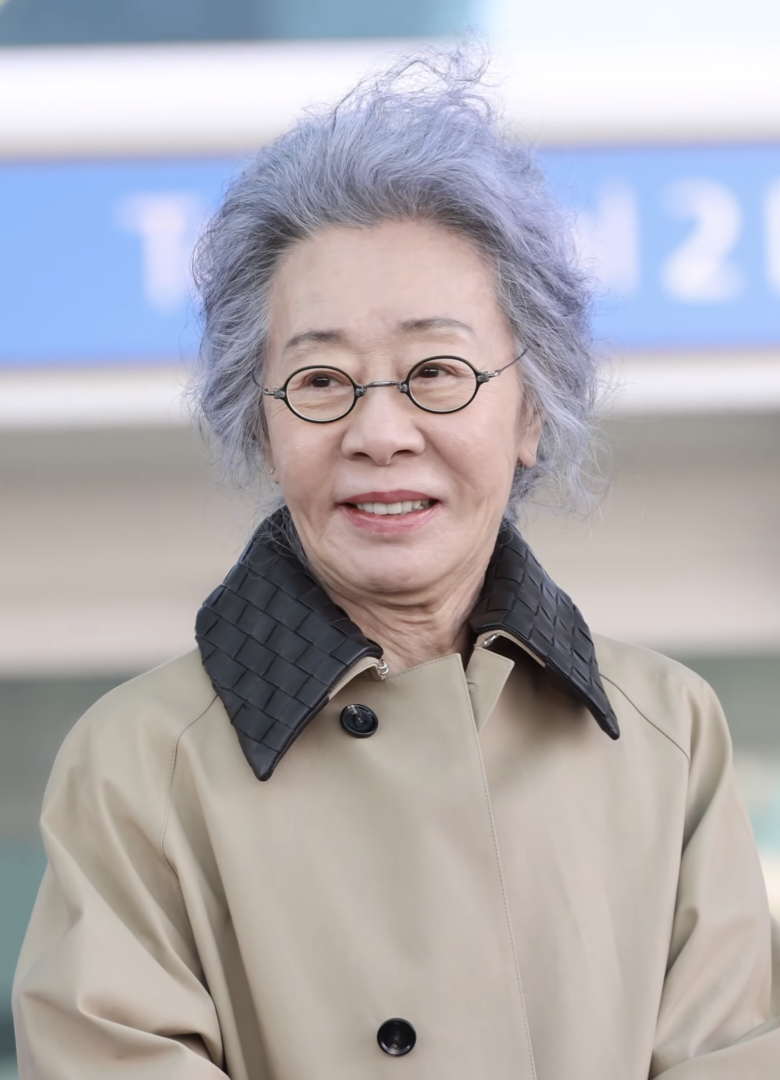
Youn Yuh-Jung won for Minari (2020); first Korean-dialogue win.

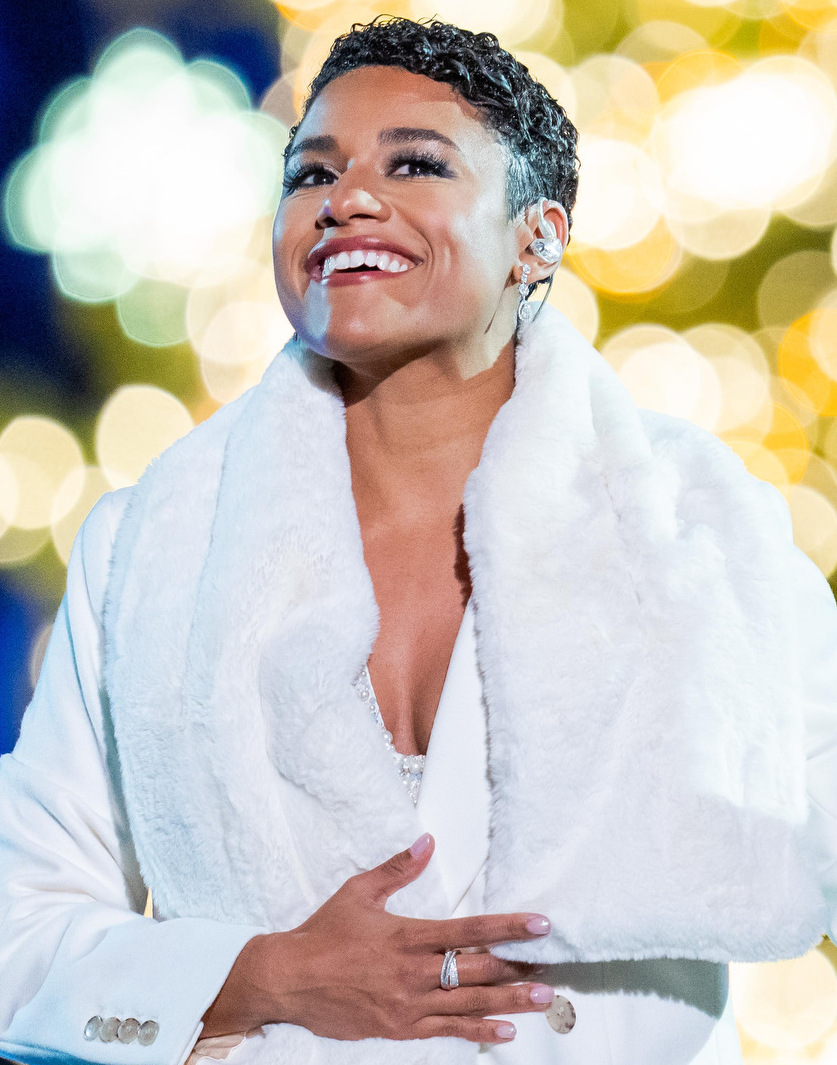
Ariana DeBose won for West Side Story (2021); first openly queer POC to win.

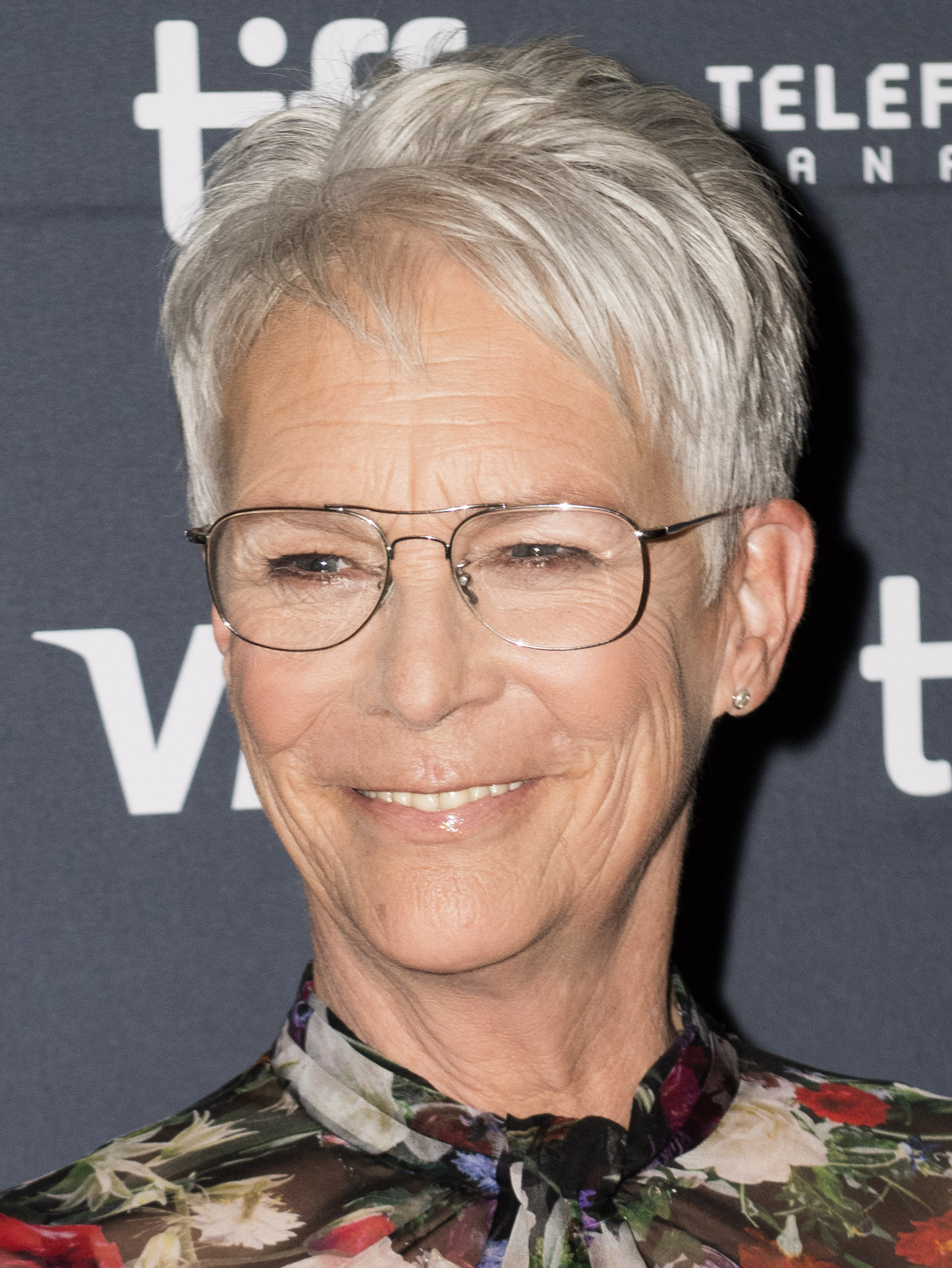
Jamie Lee Curtis won for Everything Everywhere All at Once (2022).

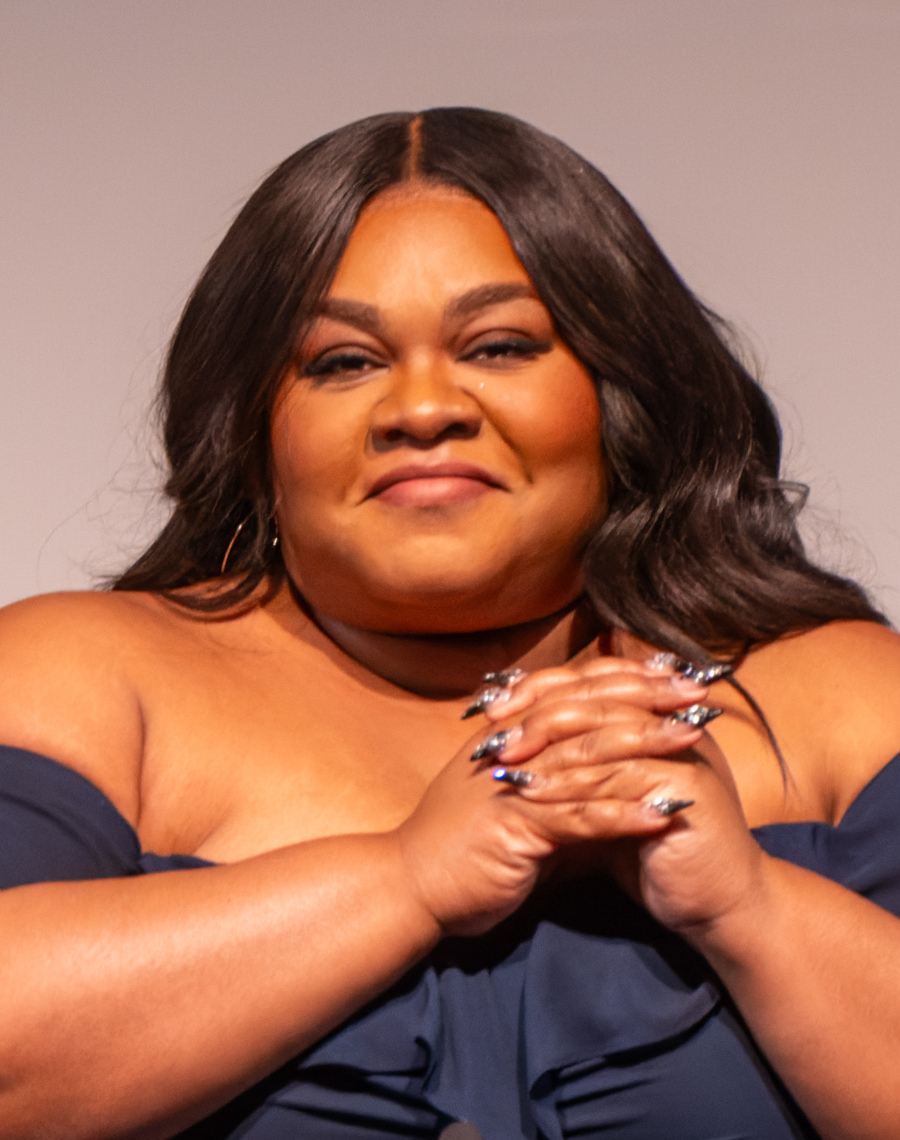
Da'Vine Joy Randolph won for The Holdovers (2023).

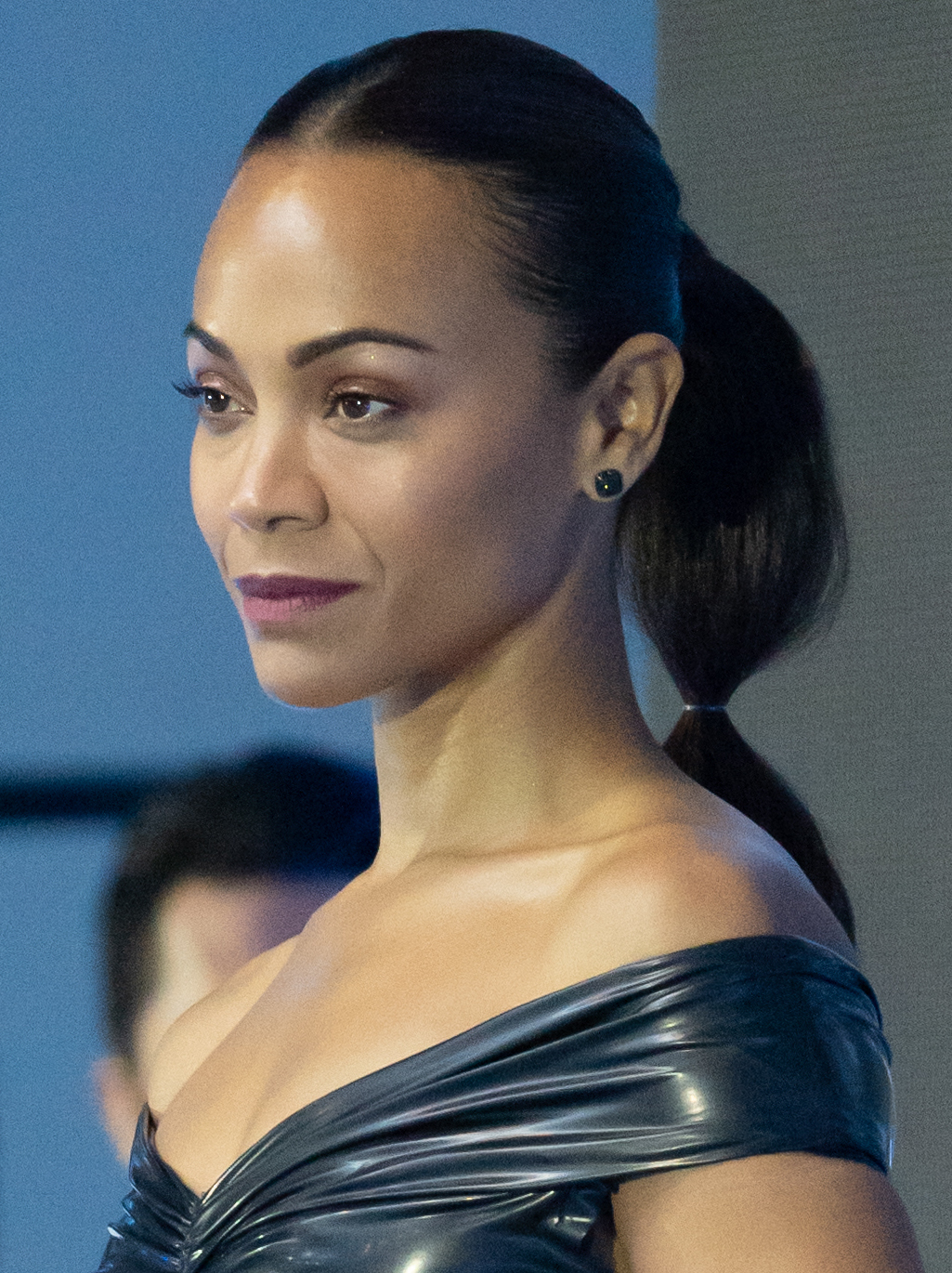
Zoe Saldaña won for Emilia Pérez (2024).

== Winners and nominees ==
In the following table, the years are listed as per Academy convention, and generally correspond to the year of film release in Los Angeles County; the ceremonies are always held the following year. For the first five ceremonies, the eligibility period spanned twelve months, from August 1 to July 31. For the 6th ceremony held in 1934, the extended eligibility period lasted from August 1, 1932, to December 31, 1933. Since the 7th ceremony held in 1935, the period of eligibility became the full previous calendar year from January 1 to December 31.

Table key
‡	Indicates the winner

=== 1930s ===
Year	Actress	Role(s)	Film	Ref.
1936 (9th)	Gale Sondergaard ‡	Faith Paleologus	Anthony Adverse	
1936 (9th)	Beulah Bondi	Rachel Jackson	The Gorgeous Hussy	
1936 (9th)	Alice Brady	Angelica Bullock	My Man Godfrey	
1936 (9th)	Bonita Granville	Mary Tilford	These Three	
1936 (9th)	Maria Ouspenskaya	Baroness Von Obersdorf	Dodsworth	
1937 (10th)	Alice Brady ‡	Molly O'Leary	In Old Chicago	
1937 (10th)	Andrea Leeds	Kay Hamilton	Stage Door	
1937 (10th)	Anne Shirley	Laurel 'Lollie' Dallas	Stella Dallas	
1937 (10th)	Claire Trevor	Francey	Dead End	
1937 (10th)	May Whitty	Mrs. Bramson	Night Must Fall	
1938 (11th)	Fay Bainter ‡	Aunt Belle Massey	Jezebel	
1938 (11th)	Beulah Bondi	Mary Wilkins	Of Human Hearts	
1938 (11th)	Billie Burke	Emily Kilbourne	Merrily We Live	
1938 (11th)	Spring Byington	Penelope 'Penny' Sycamore	You Can't Take It with You	
1938 (11th)	Miliza Korjus	Carla Donner	The Great Waltz	
1939 (12th)	Hattie McDaniel ‡	'Mammy'	Gone with the Wind	
1939 (12th)	Olivia de Havilland	Melanie Hamilton	Gone with the Wind	
1939 (12th)	Geraldine Fitzgerald	Isabella Linton	Wuthering Heights	
1939 (12th)	Edna May Oliver	Mrs. Sarah McKlennar	Drums Along the Mohawk	
1939 (12th)	Maria Ouspenskaya	Grandmother Janou	Love Affair	

=== 1940s ===
Year	Actress	Role(s)	Film	Ref.
1940 (13th)	Jane Darwell ‡	'Ma' Joad	The Grapes of Wrath	
1940 (13th)	Judith Anderson	Mrs. Danvers	Rebecca	
1940 (13th)	Ruth Hussey	Elizabeth 'Liz' Imbrie	The Philadelphia Story	
1940 (13th)	Barbara O'Neil	Duchess Françoise de Choiseul-Praslin	All This, and Heaven Too	
1940 (13th)	Marjorie Rambeau	Mamie Adams	Primrose Path	
1941 (14th)	Mary Astor ‡	Sandra Kovak	The Great Lie	
1941 (14th)	Sara Allgood	Beth Morgan	How Green Was My Valley	
1941 (14th)	Patricia Collinge	Birdie Hubbard	The Little Foxes	
1941 (14th)	Teresa Wright	Alexandra 'Zannie' Giddens	The Little Foxes	
1941 (14th)	Margaret Wycherly	Mama Mary York	Sergeant York	
1942 (15th)	Teresa Wright ‡	Carol Beldon	Mrs. Miniver	
1942 (15th)	Gladys Cooper	Mrs. Vale	Now, Voyager	
1942 (15th)	Agnes Moorehead	Fanny Minafer	The Magnificent Ambersons	
1942 (15th)	Susan Peters	Kitty Chilcet	Random Harvest	
1942 (15th)	May Whitty	Lady Beldon	Mrs. Miniver	
1943 (16th)	Katina Paxinou ‡	Pilar	For Whom the Bell Tolls	
1943 (16th)	Gladys Cooper	Sister Marie-Thérèse Vauzou	The Song of Bernadette	
1943 (16th)	Paulette Goddard	Joan O'Doul	So Proudly We Hail!	
1943 (16th)	Anne Revere	Louise (Casteròt) Soubirous	The Song of Bernadette	
1943 (16th)	Lucile Watson	Fanny Farrelly	Watch on the Rhine	
1944 (17th)	Ethel Barrymore ‡	'Ma' Mott	None but the Lonely Heart	
1944 (17th)	Jennifer Jones	Jane Deborah Hilton	Since You Went Away	
1944 (17th)	Angela Lansbury	Nancy Oliver	Gaslight	
1944 (17th)	Aline MacMahon	Mrs. Tan	Dragon Seed	
1944 (17th)	Agnes Moorehead	Baroness Aspasia Conti	Mrs. Parkington	
1945 (18th)	Anne Revere ‡	Mrs. Araminty Brown	National Velvet	
1945 (18th)	Eve Arden	Ida Corwin	Mildred Pierce	
1945 (18th)	Ann Blyth	Veda Pierce-Forrester	Mildred Pierce	
1945 (18th)	Angela Lansbury	Sibyl Vane	The Picture of Dorian Gray	
1945 (18th)	Joan Lorring	Bessie Watty	The Corn Is Green	
1946 (19th)	Anne Baxter ‡	Sophie MacDonald	The Razor's Edge	
1946 (19th)	Ethel Barrymore	Mrs. Warren	The Spiral Staircase	
1946 (19th)	Lillian Gish	Laura Belle McCanles	Duel in the Sun	
1946 (19th)	Flora Robson	Angelique Buiton	Saratoga Trunk	
1946 (19th)	Gale Sondergaard	Lady Thiang	Anna and the King of Siam	
1947 (20th)	Celeste Holm ‡	Anne Dettrey	Gentleman's Agreement	
1947 (20th)	Ethel Barrymore	Lady Sophie Horfield	The Paradine Case	
1947 (20th)	Gloria Grahame	Ginny Tremaine	Crossfire	
1947 (20th)	Marjorie Main	Phoebe 'Ma' Kettle	The Egg and I	
1947 (20th)	Anne Revere	Mrs. Green	Gentleman's Agreement	
1948 (21st)	Claire Trevor ‡	Gaye Dawn	Key Largo	
1948 (21st)	Barbara Bel Geddes	Katrin Hanson	I Remember Mama	
1948 (21st)	Ellen Corby	Aunt Trina Thorkelson	I Remember Mama	
1948 (21st)	Agnes Moorehead	Aggie MacDonald	Johnny Belinda	
1948 (21st)	Jean Simmons	Ophelia	Hamlet	
1949 (22nd)	Mercedes McCambridge ‡	Sadie Burke	All the King's Men	
1949 (22nd)	Ethel Barrymore	Miss Em	Pinky	
1949 (22nd)	Celeste Holm	Sister Scholastica	Come to the Stable	
1949 (22nd)	Elsa Lanchester	Amelia Potts	Come to the Stable	
1949 (22nd)	Ethel Waters	Dicey Johnson	Pinky	

=== 1950s ===
Year	Actress	Role(s)	Film	Ref.
1950 (23rd)	Josephine Hull ‡	Veta Louise Simmons	Harvey	
1950 (23rd)	Hope Emerson	Evelyn Harper	Caged	
1950 (23rd)	Celeste Holm	Karen Richards	All About Eve	
1950 (23rd)	Nancy Olson	Betty Schaefer	Sunset Boulevard	
1950 (23rd)	Thelma Ritter	Birdie Coonan	All About Eve	
1951 (24th)	Kim Hunter ‡	Stella Kowalski	A Streetcar Named Desire	
1951 (24th)	Joan Blondell	Annie Rawlins	The Blue Veil	
1951 (24th)	Mildred Dunnock	Linda Loman	Death of a Salesman	
1951 (24th)	Lee Grant	'Shoplifter'	Detective Story	
1951 (24th)	Thelma Ritter	Ellen McNulty	The Mating Season	
1952 (25th)	Gloria Grahame ‡	Rosemary Bartlow	The Bad and the Beautiful	
1952 (25th)	Jean Hagen	Lina Lamont	Singin' in the Rain	
1952 (25th)	Colette Marchand	Marie Charlet	Moulin Rouge	
1952 (25th)	Terry Moore	Marie Buckholder	Come Back, Little Sheba	
1952 (25th)	Thelma Ritter	Clancy	With a Song in My Heart	
1953 (26th)	Donna Reed ‡	Alma Burke / Lorene	From Here to Eternity	
1953 (26th)	Grace Kelly	Linda Nordley	Mogambo	
1953 (26th)	Geraldine Page	Angie Lowe	Hondo	
1953 (26th)	Marjorie Rambeau	Mrs. Stewart	Torch Song	
1953 (26th)	Thelma Ritter	Moe Williams	Pickup on South Street	
1954 (27th)	Eva Marie Saint ‡	Edie Doyle	On the Waterfront	
1954 (27th)	Nina Foch	Erica Martin	Executive Suite	
1954 (27th)	Katy Jurado	Señora Devereaux	Broken Lance	
1954 (27th)	Jan Sterling	Sally McKee	The High and the Mighty	
1954 (27th)	Claire Trevor	May Holst	The High and the Mighty	
1955 (28th)	Jo Van Fleet ‡	Cathy Ames / Kate Trask (Albey)	East of Eden	
1955 (28th)	Betsy Blair	Clara Snyder	Marty	
1955 (28th)	Peggy Lee	Rose Hopkins	Pete Kelly's Blues	
1955 (28th)	Marisa Pavan	Rosa Delle Rose	The Rose Tattoo	
1955 (28th)	Natalie Wood	Judy	Rebel Without a Cause	
1956 (29th)	Dorothy Malone ‡	Marylee Hadley	Written on the Wind	
1956 (29th)	Mildred Dunnock	Aunt Rose Comfort	Baby Doll	
1956 (29th)	Eileen Heckart	Hortense Daigle	The Bad Seed	
1956 (29th)	Mercedes McCambridge	Luz Benedict	Giant	
1956 (29th)	Patty McCormack	Rhoda Penmark	The Bad Seed	
1957 (30th)	Miyoshi Umeki ‡	Katsumi Kelly	Sayonara	
1957 (30th)	Carolyn Jones	'The Existentialist'	The Bachelor Party	
1957 (30th)	Elsa Lanchester	Miss Plimsoll	Witness for the Prosecution	
1957 (30th)	Hope Lange	Selena Cross	Peyton Place	
1957 (30th)	Diane Varsi	Allison MacKenzie	Peyton Place	
1958 (31st)	Wendy Hiller ‡	Miss Pat Cooper	Separate Tables	
1958 (31st)	Peggy Cass	Agnes Gooch	Auntie Mame	
1958 (31st)	Martha Hyer	Gwen French	Some Came Running	
1958 (31st)	Maureen Stapleton	Fay Doyle	Lonelyhearts	
1958 (31st)	Cara Williams	Billy's Mother	The Defiant Ones	
1959 (32nd)	Shelley Winters ‡	Petronella van Daan	The Diary of Anne Frank	
1959 (32nd)	Hermione Baddeley	Elspeth	Room at the Top	
1959 (32nd)	Susan Kohner	Sarah Jane Johnson	Imitation of Life	
1959 (32nd)	Juanita Moore	Annie Johnson	Imitation of Life	
1959 (32nd)	Thelma Ritter	Alma	Pillow Talk	

=== 1960s ===
Year	Actress	Role(s)	Film	Ref.
1960 (33rd)	Shirley Jones ‡	Lulu Bains	Elmer Gantry	
1960 (33rd)	Glynis Johns	Mrs. Firth	The Sundowners	
1960 (33rd)	Shirley Knight	Reenie Flood	The Dark at the Top of the Stairs	
1960 (33rd)	Janet Leigh	Marion Crane	Psycho	
1960 (33rd)	Mary Ure	Clara Dawes	Sons and Lovers	
1961 (34th)	Rita Moreno ‡	Anita	West Side Story	
1961 (34th)	Fay Bainter	Mrs. Amelia Tilford	The Children's Hour	
1961 (34th)	Judy Garland	Irene Hoffmann-Wallner	Judgment at Nuremberg	
1961 (34th)	Lotte Lenya	Contessa Magda Terribili-Gonzales	The Roman Spring of Mrs. Stone	
1961 (34th)	Una Merkel	Mrs. Winemiller	Summer and Smoke	
1962 (35th)	Patty Duke ‡	Helen Keller	The Miracle Worker	
1962 (35th)	Mary Badham	Jean Louise 'Scout' Finch	To Kill a Mockingbird	
1962 (35th)	Shirley Knight	Heavenly Finley	Sweet Bird of Youth	
1962 (35th)	Angela Lansbury	Eleanor Iselin	The Manchurian Candidate	
1962 (35th)	Thelma Ritter	Elizabeth (McCartney) Stroud	Birdman of Alcatraz	
1963 (36th)	Margaret Rutherford ‡	The Duchess of Brighton	The V.I.P.s	
1963 (36th)	Diane Cilento	Molly Seagrim	Tom Jones	
1963 (36th)	Edith Evans	Miss Western	Tom Jones	
1963 (36th)	Joyce Redman	Mrs. Waters / Jenny Jones	Tom Jones	
1963 (36th)	Lilia Skala	Mother Maria Marthe	Lilies of the Field	
1964 (37th)	Lila Kedrova ‡	Madame Hortense	Zorba the Greek	
1964 (37th)	Gladys Cooper	Mrs. Higgins	My Fair Lady	
1964 (37th)	Edith Evans	Mrs. St. Maugham	The Chalk Garden	
1964 (37th)	Grayson Hall	Judith Fellowes	The Night of the Iguana	
1964 (37th)	Agnes Moorehead	Velma Cruther	Hush...Hush, Sweet Charlotte	
1965 (38th)	Shelley Winters ‡	Rose-Ann D'Arcey	A Patch of Blue	
1965 (38th)	Ruth Gordon	Lucile Clover – 'The Dealer'	Inside Daisy Clover	
1965 (38th)	Joyce Redman	Emilia	Othello	
1965 (38th)	Maggie Smith	Desdemona	Othello	
1965 (38th)	Peggy Wood	The Mother Abbess	The Sound of Music	
1966 (39th)	Sandy Dennis ‡	Honey	Who's Afraid of Virginia Woolf?	
1966 (39th)	Wendy Hiller	Dame Alice More	A Man for All Seasons	
1966 (39th)	Jocelyne LaGarde	Ali'i Nui, Malama Kanakoa	Hawaii	
1966 (39th)	Vivien Merchant	Lily Clamacraft	Alfie	
1966 (39th)	Geraldine Page	Margery Chanticleer	You're a Big Boy Now	
1967 (40th)	Estelle Parsons ‡	Blanche Barrow	Bonnie and Clyde	
1967 (40th)	Carol Channing	Muzzy Van Hossmere	Thoroughly Modern Millie	
1967 (40th)	Mildred Natwick	Ethel Banks	Barefoot in the Park	
1967 (40th)	Beah Richards	Mary Prentice	Guess Who's Coming to Dinner	
1967 (40th)	Katharine Ross	Elaine Robinson	The Graduate	
1968 (41st)	Ruth Gordon ‡	Minnie Castevet	Rosemary's Baby	
1968 (41st)	Lynn Carlin	Maria Forst	Faces	
1968 (41st)	Sondra Locke	Margaret 'Mick' Kelly	The Heart Is a Lonely Hunter	
1968 (41st)	Kay Medford	Rose Brice	Funny Girl	
1968 (41st)	Estelle Parsons	Calla Mackie	Rachel, Rachel	
1969 (42nd)	Goldie Hawn ‡	Toni Simmons	Cactus Flower	
1969 (42nd)	Catherine Burns	Rhoda	Last Summer	
1969 (42nd)	Dyan Cannon	Alice Henderson	Bob & Carol & Ted & Alice	
1969 (42nd)	Sylvia Miles	Cass	Midnight Cowboy	
1969 (42nd)	Susannah York	Alice LeBlanc	They Shoot Horses, Don't They?	

=== 1970s ===
Year	Actress	Role(s)	Film	Ref.
1970 (43rd)	Helen Hayes ‡	Ada Quonsett	Airport	
1970 (43rd)	Karen Black	Rayette Dipesto	Five Easy Pieces	
1970 (43rd)	Lee Grant	Joyce Enders	The Landlord	
1970 (43rd)	Sally Kellerman	Major Margaret 'Hot Lips' Houlihan	M*A*S*H	
1970 (43rd)	Maureen Stapleton	Inez Guerrero	Airport	
1971 (44th)	Cloris Leachman ‡	Ruth Popper	The Last Picture Show	
1971 (44th)	Ann-Margret	Bobbie	Carnal Knowledge	
1971 (44th)	Ellen Burstyn	Lois Farrow	The Last Picture Show	
1971 (44th)	Barbara Harris	Allison Densmore	Who Is Harry Kellerman and Why Is He Saying Those Terrible Things About Me?	
1971 (44th)	Margaret Leighton	Mrs. Madeleine Maudsley	The Go-Between	
1972 (45th)	Eileen Heckart ‡	Mrs. Baker	Butterflies Are Free	
1972 (45th)	Jeannie Berlin	Lila Kolodny	The Heartbreak Kid	
1972 (45th)	Geraldine Page	Gertrude Wilson	Pete 'n' Tillie	
1972 (45th)	Susan Tyrrell	Oma Lee Greer	Fat City	
1972 (45th)	Shelley Winters	Belle Rosen	The Poseidon Adventure	
1973 (46th)	Tatum O'Neal ‡	Addie Loggins	Paper Moon	
1973 (46th)	Linda Blair	Regan MacNeil	The Exorcist	
1973 (46th)	Candy Clark	Debbie Dunham	American Graffiti	
1973 (46th)	Madeline Kahn	Trixie Delight	Paper Moon	
1973 (46th)	Sylvia Sidney	Mrs. Pritchett	Summer Wishes, Winter Dreams	
1974 (47th)	Ingrid Bergman ‡	Greta Ohlsson	Murder on the Orient Express	
1974 (47th)	Valentina Cortese	Séverine	Day for Night	
1974 (47th)	Madeline Kahn	Lili von Shtüpp	Blazing Saddles	
1974 (47th)	Diane Ladd	Florence Jean 'Flo' Castleberry	Alice Doesn't Live Here Anymore	
1974 (47th)	Talia Shire	Connie Corleone	The Godfather Part II	
1975 (48th)	Lee Grant ‡	Felicia Karpf	Shampoo	
1975 (48th)	Ronee Blakley	Barbara Jean	Nashville	
1975 (48th)	Sylvia Miles	Jessie Halstead Florian	Farewell, My Lovely	
1975 (48th)	Lily Tomlin	Linnea Reese	Nashville	
1975 (48th)	Brenda Vaccaro	Linda Riggs	Once Is Not Enough	
1976 (49th)	Beatrice Straight ‡	Louise Schumacher	Network	
1976 (49th)	Jane Alexander	Judy 'The Bookkeeper' Hoback	All the President's Men	
1976 (49th)	Jodie Foster	Iris 'Easy' Steensma	Taxi Driver	
1976 (49th)	Lee Grant	Lili Rosen	Voyage of the Damned	
1976 (49th)	Piper Laurie	Margaret White	Carrie	
1977 (50th)	Vanessa Redgrave ‡	Julia	Julia	
1977 (50th)	Leslie Browne	Emilia Rodgers	The Turning Point	
1977 (50th)	Quinn Cummings	Lucy McFadden	The Goodbye Girl	
1977 (50th)	Melinda Dillon	Jillian Guiler	Close Encounters of the Third Kind	
1977 (50th)	Tuesday Weld	Katherine Dunn	Looking for Mr. Goodbar	
1978 (51st)	Maggie Smith ‡	Diana Barrie	California Suite	
1978 (51st)	Dyan Cannon	Julia Farnsworth	Heaven Can Wait	
1978 (51st)	Penelope Milford	Vi Munson	Coming Home	
1978 (51st)	Maureen Stapleton	Pearl	Interiors	
1978 (51st)	Meryl Streep	Linda	The Deer Hunter	
1979 (52nd)	Meryl Streep ‡	Joanna (Stern) Kramer	Kramer vs. Kramer	
1979 (52nd)	Jane Alexander	Margaret Phelps	Kramer vs. Kramer	
1979 (52nd)	Barbara Barrie	Evelyn Stohler	Breaking Away	
1979 (52nd)	Candice Bergen	Jessica Potter	Starting Over	
1979 (52nd)	Mariel Hemingway	Tracy	Manhattan	

=== 1980s ===
Year	Actress	Role(s)	Film	Ref.
1980 (53rd)	Mary Steenburgen ‡	Lynda West-Dummar	Melvin and Howard	
1980 (53rd)	Eileen Brennan	Capt. Doreen Lewis	Private Benjamin	
1980 (53rd)	Eva Le Gallienne	Pearl Harper	Resurrection	
1980 (53rd)	Cathy Moriarty	Vikki LaMotta	Raging Bull	
1980 (53rd)	Diana Scarwid	Louise	Inside Moves	
1981 (54th)	Maureen Stapleton ‡	Emma Goldman	Reds	
1981 (54th)	Melinda Dillon	Teresa Perrone	Absence of Malice	
1981 (54th)	Jane Fonda	Chelsea Thayer-Wayne	On Golden Pond	
1981 (54th)	Joan Hackett	Toby Landau	Only When I Laugh	
1981 (54th)	Elizabeth McGovern	Evelyn Nesbit	Ragtime	
1982 (55th)	Jessica Lange ‡	Julie Nichols	Tootsie	
1982 (55th)	Glenn Close	Jenny Fields	The World According to Garp	
1982 (55th)	Teri Garr	Sandy Lester	Tootsie	
1982 (55th)	Kim Stanley	Lillian Farmer	Frances	
1982 (55th)	Lesley Ann Warren	Norma Cassidy	Victor/Victoria	
1983 (56th)	Linda Hunt ‡	Billy Kwan	The Year of Living Dangerously	
1983 (56th)	Cher	Dolly Pelliker	Silkwood	
1983 (56th)	Glenn Close	Dr. Sarah Cooper	The Big Chill	
1983 (56th)	Amy Irving	Hadass Vishkower	Yentl	
1983 (56th)	Alfre Woodard	Beatrice 'GeeChee'	Cross Creek	
1984 (57th)	Peggy Ashcroft ‡	Mrs. Moore	A Passage to India	
1984 (57th)	Glenn Close	Iris Gaines	The Natural	
1984 (57th)	Lindsay Crouse	Margaret Lomax	Places in the Heart	
1984 (57th)	Christine Lahti	Hazel Zanussi	Swing Shift	
1984 (57th)	Geraldine Page	Mrs. Ritter	The Pope of Greenwich Village	
1985 (58th)	Anjelica Huston ‡	MaeRose Prizzi	Prizzi's Honor	
1985 (58th)	Margaret Avery	'Shug' Avery	The Color Purple	
1985 (58th)	Amy Madigan	Sunny Mackenzie-Sobel	Twice in a Lifetime	
1985 (58th)	Meg Tilly	Sister Agnes Devereaux	Agnes of God	
1985 (58th)	Oprah Winfrey	Sofia Johnson	The Color Purple	
1986 (59th)	Dianne Wiest ‡	Holly	Hannah and Her Sisters	
1986 (59th)	Tess Harper	Chick Boyle	Crimes of the Heart	
1986 (59th)	Piper Laurie	Mrs. Norman	Children of a Lesser God	
1986 (59th)	Mary Elizabeth Mastrantonio	Carmen	The Color of Money	
1986 (59th)	Maggie Smith	Charlotte Bartlett	A Room with a View	
1987 (60th)	Olympia Dukakis ‡	Rose Castorini	Moonstruck	
1987 (60th)	Norma Aleandro	Florencia Sánchez Morales	Gaby: A True Story	
1987 (60th)	Anne Archer	Beth Gallagher	Fatal Attraction	
1987 (60th)	Anne Ramsey	'Momma' Lift	Throw Momma from the Train	
1987 (60th)	Ann Sothern	Letitia 'Tisha' Benson-Doughty	The Whales of August	
1988 (61st)	Geena Davis ‡	Muriel Pritchett	The Accidental Tourist	
1988 (61st)	Joan Cusack	'Cyn'	Working Girl	
1988 (61st)	Frances McDormand	Mrs. Pell	Mississippi Burning	
1988 (61st)	Michelle Pfeiffer	Madame Marie de Tourvel	Dangerous Liaisons	
1988 (61st)	Sigourney Weaver	Katharine Parker	Working Girl	
1989 (62nd)	Brenda Fricker ‡	Bridget Fagan Brown	My Left Foot	
1989 (62nd)	Anjelica Huston	Tamara Luria-Broder	Enemies, A Love Story	
1989 (62nd)	Lena Olin	Masha Bloch-Tortshiner	Enemies, A Love Story	
1989 (62nd)	Julia Roberts	Shelby Eatenton-Latcherie	Steel Magnolias	
1989 (62nd)	Dianne Wiest	Helen Buckman	Parenthood	

=== 1990s ===
Year	Actress	Role(s)	Film	Ref.
1990 (63rd)	Whoopi Goldberg ‡	Oda Mae Brown	Ghost	
1990 (63rd)	Annette Bening	Myra Langtry	The Grifters	
1990 (63rd)	Lorraine Bracco	Karen Hill	GoodFellas	
1990 (63rd)	Diane Ladd	Marietta Fortune	Wild at Heart	
1990 (63rd)	Mary McDonnell	Stands With A Fist	Dances With Wolves	
1991 (64th)	Mercedes Ruehl ‡	Anne Napolitano	The Fisher King	
1991 (64th)	Diane Ladd	Mrs. Hillyer	Rambling Rose	
1991 (64th)	Juliette Lewis	Danielle Bowden	Cape Fear	
1991 (64th)	Kate Nelligan	Lila Wingo-Newbury	The Prince of Tides	
1991 (64th)	Jessica Tandy	Virginia 'Ninny' Threadgoode	Fried Green Tomatoes	
1992 (65th)	Marisa Tomei ‡	Mona Lisa Vito	My Cousin Vinny	
1992 (65th)	Judy Davis	Sally Simmons	Husbands and Wives	
1992 (65th)	Joan Plowright	Mrs. Fisher	Enchanted April	
1992 (65th)	Vanessa Redgrave	Mrs. Ruth Wilcox	Howards End	
1992 (65th)	Miranda Richardson	Ingrid Thompson-Fleming	Damage	
1993 (66th)	Anna Paquin ‡	Flora McGrath	The Piano	
1993 (66th)	Holly Hunter	Tammy Hemphill	The Firm	
1993 (66th)	Rosie Perez	Carla Rodrigo	Fearless	
1993 (66th)	Winona Ryder	May Welland-Archer	The Age of Innocence	
1993 (66th)	Emma Thompson	Gareth Peirce	In the Name of the Father	
1994 (67th)	Dianne Wiest ‡	Helen Sinclair	Bullets Over Broadway	
1994 (67th)	Rosemary Harris	Rose Esther Haigh-Wood	Tom & Viv	
1994 (67th)	Helen Mirren	Queen Charlotte of Hanover	The Madness of King George	
1994 (67th)	Uma Thurman	Mia Wallace	Pulp Fiction	
1994 (67th)	Jennifer Tilly	Olive Neal	Bullets Over Broadway	
1995 (68th)	Mira Sorvino ‡	Leslie Ash / Linda	Mighty Aphrodite	
1995 (68th)	Joan Allen	First Lady Thelma 'Pat' Nixon	Nixon	
1995 (68th)	Kathleen Quinlan	Marilyn Lovell	Apollo 13	
1995 (68th)	Mare Winningham	Georgia Flood	Georgia	
1995 (68th)	Kate Winslet	Marianne Dashwood	Sense and Sensibility	
1996 (69th)	Juliette Binoche ‡	Hana	The English Patient	
1996 (69th)	Joan Allen	Elizabeth Proctor	The Crucible	
1996 (69th)	Lauren Bacall	Hannah Morgan	The Mirror Has Two Faces	
1996 (69th)	Barbara Hershey	Madame Serena Merle	The Portrait of a Lady	
1996 (69th)	Marianne Jean-Baptiste	Hortense Cumberbatch	Secrets & Lies	
1997 (70th)	Kim Basinger ‡	Lynn Bracken	L.A. Confidential	
1997 (70th)	Joan Cusack	Emily Montgomery	In & Out	
1997 (70th)	Minnie Driver	Skylar	Good Will Hunting	
1997 (70th)	Julianne Moore	Maggie / Amber Waves	Boogie Nights	
1997 (70th)	Gloria Stuart	Rose Dawson-Calvert	Titanic	
1998 (71st)	Judi Dench ‡	Queen Elizabeth I	Shakespeare in Love	
1998 (71st)	Kathy Bates	Libby Holden	Primary Colors	
1998 (71st)	Brenda Blethyn	Mari Hoff	Little Voice	
1998 (71st)	Rachel Griffiths	Hilary du Pré	Hilary and Jackie	
1998 (71st)	Lynn Redgrave	Hanna	Gods and Monsters	
1999 (72nd)	Angelina Jolie ‡	Lisa Rowe	Girl, Interrupted	
1999 (72nd)	Toni Collette	Lynn Sear	The Sixth Sense	
1999 (72nd)	Catherine Keener	Maxine Lund	Being John Malkovich	
1999 (72nd)	Samantha Morton	Hattie	Sweet and Lowdown	
1999 (72nd)	Chloë Sevigny	Lana Tisdel	Boys Don't Cry	

=== 2000s ===
Year	Actress	Role(s)	Film	Ref.
2000 (73rd)	Marcia Gay Harden ‡	Lee Krasner	Pollock	
2000 (73rd)	Judi Dench	Armande Voizin	Chocolat	
2000 (73rd)	Kate Hudson	Penny Lane	Almost Famous	
2000 (73rd)	Frances McDormand	Elaine Miller	Almost Famous	
2000 (73rd)	Julie Walters	Sandra Wilkinson	Billy Elliot	
2001 (74th)	Jennifer Connelly ‡	Alicia Nash	A Beautiful Mind	
2001 (74th)	Helen Mirren	Mrs. Wilson	Gosford Park	
2001 (74th)	Maggie Smith	Constance, Dowager Countess of Trentham	Gosford Park	
2001 (74th)	Marisa Tomei	Natalie Strout	In the Bedroom	
2001 (74th)	Kate Winslet	Iris Murdoch	Iris	
2002 (75th)	Catherine Zeta-Jones ‡	Velma Kelly	Chicago	
2002 (75th)	Kathy Bates	Roberta Hertzel	About Schmidt	
2002 (75th)	Julianne Moore	Laura Brown	The Hours	
2002 (75th)	Queen Latifah	Matron 'Mama' Morton	Chicago	
2002 (75th)	Meryl Streep	Susan Orlean	Adaptation.	
2003 (76th)	Renée Zellweger ‡	Ruby Thewes	Cold Mountain	
2003 (76th)	Shohreh Aghdashloo	Nadereh Behrani	House of Sand and Fog	
2003 (76th)	Patricia Clarkson	Joy Burns	Pieces of April	
2003 (76th)	Marcia Gay Harden	Celeste Boyle	Mystic River	
2003 (76th)	Holly Hunter	Melanie Freeland	Thirteen	
2004 (77th)	Cate Blanchett ‡	Katharine Hepburn	The Aviator	
2004 (77th)	Laura Linney	Clara McMillen	Kinsey	
2004 (77th)	Virginia Madsen	Maya Randall	Sideways	
2004 (77th)	Sophie Okonedo	Tatiana Rusesabagina	Hotel Rwanda	
2004 (77th)	Natalie Portman	Jane Jones /'Alice Ayres'	Closer	
2005 (78th)	Rachel Weisz ‡	Tessa Quayle	The Constant Gardener	
2005 (78th)	Amy Adams	Ashley Johnsten	Junebug	
2005 (78th)	Catherine Keener	Harper Lee	Capote	
2005 (78th)	Frances McDormand	Glory Dodge	North Country	
2005 (78th)	Michelle Williams	Alma Beers	Brokeback Mountain	
2006 (79th)	Jennifer Hudson ‡	Effie White	Dreamgirls	
2006 (79th)	Adriana Barraza	Amelia Hernández	Babel	
2006 (79th)	Cate Blanchett	Bathsheba 'Sheba' Hart	Notes on a Scandal	
2006 (79th)	Abigail Breslin	Olive Hoover	Little Miss Sunshine	
2006 (79th)	Rinko Kikuchi	Chieko Wataya	Babel	
2007 (80th)	Tilda Swinton ‡	Karen Crowder	Michael Clayton	
2007 (80th)	Cate Blanchett	Jude Quinn	I'm Not There	
2007 (80th)	Ruby Dee	Mahalee Lucas	American Gangster	
2007 (80th)	Saoirse Ronan	Briony Tallis	Atonement	
2007 (80th)	Amy Ryan	Helene McCready	Gone Baby Gone	
2008 (81st)	Penélope Cruz ‡	María Elena	Vicky Cristina Barcelona	
2008 (81st)	Amy Adams	Sister Marita James	Doubt	
2008 (81st)	Viola Davis	Mrs. Miller	Doubt	
2008 (81st)	Taraji P. Henson	'Queenie'	The Curious Case of Benjamin Button	
2008 (81st)	Marisa Tomei	Pam / 'Cassidy'	The Wrestler	
2009 (82nd)	Mo'Nique ‡	Mary Lee Johnston	Precious	
2009 (82nd)	Penélope Cruz	Carla Albanese	Nine	
2009 (82nd)	Vera Farmiga	Alex Goran	Up in the Air	
2009 (82nd)	Maggie Gyllenhaal	Jean Craddock	Crazy Heart	
2009 (82nd)	Anna Kendrick	Natalie Keener	Up in the Air	

=== 2010s ===
Year	Actress	Role(s)	Film	Ref.
2010 (83rd)	Melissa Leo ‡	Alice Eklund-Ward	The Fighter	
2010 (83rd)	Amy Adams	Charlene Fleming	The Fighter	
2010 (83rd)	Helena Bonham Carter	Queen Elizabeth	The King's Speech	
2010 (83rd)	Hailee Steinfeld	Mattie Ross	True Grit	
2010 (83rd)	Jacki Weaver	Janine 'Smurf' Cody	Animal Kingdom	
2011 (84th)	Octavia Spencer ‡	Minerva 'Minny' Jackson	The Help	
2011 (84th)	Bérénice Bejo	Peppy Miller	The Artist	
2011 (84th)	Jessica Chastain	Celia Rae Foote	The Help	
2011 (84th)	Melissa McCarthy	Megan Price	Bridesmaids	
2011 (84th)	Janet McTeer	Hubert Page	Albert Nobbs	
2012 (85th)	Anne Hathaway ‡	Fantine	Les Misérables	
2012 (85th)	Amy Adams	Peggy Dodd	The Master	
2012 (85th)	Sally Field	First Lady Mary Todd Lincoln	Lincoln	
2012 (85th)	Helen Hunt	Cheryl Cohen-Greene	The Sessions	
2012 (85th)	Jacki Weaver	Dolores Solitano	Silver Linings Playbook	
2013 (86th)	Lupita Nyong'o ‡	Patsey	12 Years a Slave	
2013 (86th)	Sally Hawkins	Ginger	Blue Jasmine	
2013 (86th)	Jennifer Lawrence	Rosalyn Rosenfeld	American Hustle	
2013 (86th)	Julia Roberts	Barbara Weston-Fordham	August: Osage County	
2013 (86th)	June Squibb	Kate Grant	Nebraska	
2014 (87th)	Patricia Arquette ‡	Olivia Evans	Boyhood	
2014 (87th)	Laura Dern	Barbara 'Bobbi' Grey	Wild	
2014 (87th)	Keira Knightley	Joan Clarke	The Imitation Game	
2014 (87th)	Emma Stone	Sam Thomson	Birdman	
2014 (87th)	Meryl Streep	'The Witch'	Into the Woods	
2015 (88th)	Alicia Vikander ‡	Gerda Wegener	The Danish Girl	
2015 (88th)	Jennifer Jason Leigh	'Crazy' Daisy Domergue	The Hateful Eight	
2015 (88th)	Rooney Mara	Therese Belivet	Carol	
2015 (88th)	Rachel McAdams	Sacha Pfeiffer	Spotlight	
2015 (88th)	Kate Winslet	Joanna Hoffman	Steve Jobs	
2016 (89th)	Viola Davis ‡	Rose Lee Maxson	Fences	
2016 (89th)	Naomie Harris	Paula	Moonlight	
2016 (89th)	Nicole Kidman	Sue Brierley	Lion	
2016 (89th)	Octavia Spencer	Dorothy Vaughan	Hidden Figures	
2016 (89th)	Michelle Williams	Randi Chandler	Manchester by the Sea	
2017 (90th)	Allison Janney ‡	LaVona Fay Golden	I, Tonya	
2017 (90th)	Mary J. Blige	Florence Jackson	Mudbound	
2017 (90th)	Lesley Manville	Cyril Woodcock	Phantom Thread	
2017 (90th)	Laurie Metcalf	Marion McPherson	Lady Bird	
2017 (90th)	Octavia Spencer	Zelda Delilah Fuller	The Shape of Water	
2018 (91st)	Regina King ‡	Sharon Rivers	If Beale Street Could Talk	
2018 (91st)	Amy Adams	Lynne Cheney	Vice	
2018 (91st)	Marina de Tavira	Sofía	Roma	
2018 (91st)	Emma Stone	Abigail Masham	The Favourite	
2018 (91st)	Rachel Weisz	Sarah Churchill	The Favourite	
2019 (92nd)	Laura Dern ‡	Nora Fanshaw	Marriage Story	
2019 (92nd)	Kathy Bates	Barbara 'Bobi' Jewell	Richard Jewell	
2019 (92nd)	Scarlett Johansson	Rosie Betzler	Jojo Rabbit	
2019 (92nd)	Florence Pugh	Amy Curtis March	Little Women	
2019 (92nd)	Margot Robbie	Kayla Pospisil	Bombshell	

=== 2020s ===
Year	Actress	Role(s)	Film	Ref.
2020/21 (93rd)	Yuh-jung Youn ‡	Soon-ja	Minari	
2020/21 (93rd)	Maria Bakalova	Tutar Sagdiyev	Borat Subsequent Moviefilm	
2020/21 (93rd)	Glenn Close	Bonnie 'Mamaw' Vance	Hillbilly Elegy	
2020/21 (93rd)	Olivia Colman	Anne	The Father	
2020/21 (93rd)	Amanda Seyfried	Marion Davies	Mank	
2021 (94th)	Ariana DeBose ‡	Anita	West Side Story	
2021 (94th)	Jessie Buckley	Young Leda Caruso	The Lost Daughter	
2021 (94th)	Judi Dench	Granny	Belfast	
2021 (94th)	Kirsten Dunst	Rose Gordon	The Power of the Dog	
2021 (94th)	Aunjanue Ellis-Taylor	Oracene 'Brandy' Price	King Richard	
2022 (95th)	Jamie Lee Curtis ‡	Deirdre Beaubeirdre	Everything Everywhere All at Once	
2022 (95th)	Angela Bassett	Queen Ramonda	Black Panther: Wakanda Forever	
2022 (95th)	Hong Chau	Liz	The Whale	
2022 (95th)	Kerry Condon	Siobhán Súilleabháin	The Banshees of Inisherin	
2022 (95th)	Stephanie Hsu	Joy Wang / Jobu Tupaki	Everything Everywhere All at Once	
2023 (96th)	Da'Vine Joy Randolph ‡	Mary Lamb	The Holdovers	
2023 (96th)	Emily Blunt	Katherine 'Kitty' Oppenheimer	Oppenheimer	
2023 (96th)	Danielle Brooks	Sofia	The Color Purple	
2023 (96th)	America Ferrera	Gloria	Barbie	
2023 (96th)	Jodie Foster	Bonnie Stoll	Nyad	
2024 (97th)	Zoe Saldaña ‡	Rita Mora Castro	Emilia Pérez	
2024 (97th)	Monica Barbaro	Joan Baez	A Complete Unknown	
2024 (97th)	Ariana Grande	Galinda 'Glinda' Upland	Wicked	
2024 (97th)	Felicity Jones	Erzsébet Tóth	The Brutalist	
2024 (97th)	Isabella Rossellini	Sister Agnes	Conclave	
2025 (98th)	Amy Madigan ‡	Aunt Gladys	Weapons	
2025 (98th)	Elle Fanning	Rachel Kemp	Sentimental Value	
2025 (98th)	Inga Ibsdotter Lilleaas	Agnes Borg Pettersen	Sentimental Value	
2025 (98th)	Wunmi Mosaku	Annie	Sinners	
2025 (98th)	Teyana Taylor	Perfidia Beverly Hills	One Battle After Another	

== Multiple wins and nominations ==
The following individuals received two Best Supporting Actress awards:

Wins	Actress	Nominations
2	Dianne Wiest	3
2	Shelley Winters	3

The following individuals received two or more Best Supporting Actress nominations:

Nominations	Actress
6	Thelma Ritter
5	Amy Adams
4	Ethel Barrymore
4	Glenn Close
4	Lee Grant
4	Agnes Moorehead
4	Geraldine Page
4	Maggie Smith
4	Maureen Stapleton
4	Meryl Streep
3	Kathy Bates
3	Cate Blanchett
3	Gladys Cooper
3	Judi Dench
3	Celeste Holm
3	Diane Ladd
3	Angela Lansbury
3	Frances McDormand
3	Anne Revere
3	Octavia Spencer
3	Marisa Tomei
3	Claire Trevor
3	Dianne Wiest
3	Kate Winslet
3	Shelley Winters
2	Jane Alexander
2	Joan Allen
2	Fay Bainter
2	Beulah Bondi
2	Alice Brady
2	Dyan Cannon
2	Penélope Cruz
2	Joan Cusack
2	Viola Davis
2	Laura Dern
2	Melinda Dillon
2	Mildred Dunnock
2	Edith Evans
2	Jodie Foster
2	Ruth Gordon
2	Gloria Grahame
2	Marcia Gay Harden
2	Eileen Heckart
2	Wendy Hiller
2	Holly Hunter
2	Anjelica Huston
2	Madeline Kahn
2	Catherine Keener
2	Shirley Knight
2	Elsa Lanchester
2	Piper Laurie
2	Amy Madigan
2	Mercedes McCambridge
2	Sylvia Miles
2	Helen Mirren
2	Julianne Moore
2	Maria Ouspenskaya
2	Estelle Parsons
2	Marjorie Rambeau
2	Vanessa Redgrave
2	Joyce Redman
2	Julia Roberts
2	Gale Sondergaard
2	Emma Stone
2	Jacki Weaver
2	Rachel Weisz
2	May Whitty
2	Michelle Williams
2	Teresa Wright

== Age superlatives ==
Record	Actress	Film	Age (in years)	Ref.
Oldest Winner	Peggy Ashcroft	A Passage to India	77	
Oldest Nominee	Gloria Stuart	Titanic	87	
Youngest Winner	Tatum O'Neal	Paper Moon	10	
Youngest Nominee	Tatum O'Neal	Paper Moon	10	

== Films with multiple Supporting Actress nominations ==
There have been 37 instances in which films have produced more than one nominee within this category. Tom Jones (1963) was the only film which garnered three nominations, while all others obtained two.

Winners are in bold.

- Gone with the Wind (1939) – Olivia de Havilland and **Hattie McDaniel**
- The Little Foxes (1941) – Patricia Collinge and Teresa Wright
- Mrs. Miniver (1942) – May Whitty and **Teresa Wright**
- The Song of Bernadette (1943) – Gladys Cooper and Anne Revere
- Mildred Pierce (1945) – Eve Arden and Ann Blyth
- Gentleman's Agreement (1947) – **Celeste Holm** and Anne Revere
- I Remember Mama (1948) – Barbara Bel Geddes and Ellen Corby
- Come to the Stable (1949) – Celeste Holm and Elsa Lanchester
- Pinky (1949) – Ethel Barrymore and Ethel Waters
- All About Eve (1950) – Celeste Holm and Thelma Ritter
- The High and the Mighty (1954) – Jan Sterling and Claire Trevor
- The Bad Seed (1956) – Eileen Heckart and Patty McCormack
- Peyton Place (1957) – Hope Lange and Diane Varsi
- Imitation of Life (1959) – Susan Kohner and Juanita Moore
- Tom Jones (1963) – Diane Cilento, Edith Evans, and Joyce Redman
- Othello (1965) – Joyce Redman and Maggie Smith
- Airport (1970) – **Helen Hayes** and Maureen Stapleton
- The Last Picture Show (1971) – Ellen Burstyn and **Cloris Leachman**
- Paper Moon (1973) – Madeline Kahn and **Tatum O'Neal**
- Nashville (1975) – Ronee Blakley and Lily Tomlin
- Kramer vs. Kramer (1979) – Jane Alexander and **Meryl Streep**
- Tootsie (1982) – Teri Garr and **Jessica Lange**
- The Color Purple (1985) – Margaret Avery and Oprah Winfrey
- Working Girl (1988) – Joan Cusack and Sigourney Weaver
- Enemies, A Love Story (1989) – Anjelica Huston and Lena Olin
- Bullets Over Broadway (1994) – Jennifer Tilly and **Dianne Wiest**
- Almost Famous (2000) – Kate Hudson and Frances McDormand
- Gosford Park (2001) – Helen Mirren and Maggie Smith
- Chicago (2002) – Queen Latifah and **Catherine Zeta-Jones**
- Babel (2006) – Adriana Barraza and Rinko Kikuchi
- Doubt (2008) – Amy Adams and Viola Davis
- Up in the Air (2009) – Vera Farmiga and Anna Kendrick
- The Fighter (2010) – Amy Adams and **Melissa Leo**
- The Help (2011) – Jessica Chastain and **Octavia Spencer**
- The Favourite (2018) – Emma Stone and Rachel Weisz
- Everything Everywhere All at Once (2022) – **Jamie Lee Curtis** and Stephanie Hsu
- Sentimental Value (2025) – Elle Fanning and Inga Ibsdotter Lilleaas

== Multiple character nominations ==
Winners are in bold.

- Anita from West Side Story (**Rita Moreno**, 1961) and West Side Story (**Ariana DeBose**, 2021)
- Sofia from The Color Purple (Oprah Winfrey, 1985) and The Color Purple (Danielle Brooks, 2023)

== See also ==
- Academy Award for Best Supporting Actor
- Actor Award for Outstanding Performance by a Female Actor in a Supporting Role
- BAFTA Award for Best Actress in a Supporting Role
- Critics' Choice Movie Award for Best Supporting Actress
- Golden Globe Award for Best Supporting Actress – Motion Picture
- Independent Spirit Award for Best Supporting Performance
- Lists of acting awards
- List of actors with Academy Award nominations
- List of actors with more than one Academy Award nomination in the acting categories
- List of actors with two or more Academy Awards in acting categories
- List of awards for supporting actor

== Bibliography ==
- Crouse, Richard (2005). Reel Winners: Movie Award Trivia. Toronto, Ontario, Canada: University of Toronto Press. ISBN 978-1-55002-574-3.
- Kinn, Gail; Piazza, Jim (2014), The Academy Awards: The Complete Unofficial History, New York, United States: Workman Publishing Company, ISBN 978-1-57912-986-6
- Levy, Emanuel (2003), All About Oscar: The History and Politics of the Academy Awards, New York, United States: Continuum International Publishing Group, ISBN 978-0-82641-452-6
- Thise, Mark (2008), Hollywood Winners & Losers A to Z, New York, United States: Limelight Editions, ISBN 978-0-87910-351-4
- Wiley, Mason; Bona, Damien (1996). Inside Oscar: The Unofficial History of the Academy Awards (5 ed.). New York, United States: Ballantine Books. ISBN 978-0-34540-053-6. OCLC 779680732.
