= Idealism =

Metaphysical position that reality is fundamentally mental

Idealism in philosophy, also known as philosophical idealism or metaphysical idealism, is the set of metaphysical perspectives asserting that mind (consciousness) is the ultimate basis of reality and that abstractions are more fundamental than sensory things. Because there are different types of idealism, it is difficult to define the term uniformly.

Indian philosophy contains some of the first defenses of idealism, such as in Vedanta and in Shaiva Pratyabhijña thought. These systems of thought argue for an all-pervading consciousness as the true nature and ground of reality. Idealism is also found in some streams of Mahayana Buddhism, such as in the Yogācāra school, which argued for a "mind-only" (cittamatra) philosophy on the analysis of subjective experience. In the West, idealism traces its roots back to Plato in ancient Greece, who proposed that absolute, unchanging, timeless ideas constitute the highest form of reality: Platonic idealism. This was revived and transformed in the early modern period by Immanuel Kant's arguments that our knowledge of reality is completely based on mental structures: transcendental idealism.

Epistemologically, idealism is accompanied by a rejection of the possibility of knowing the existence of any thing independent of mind. Ontologically, idealism asserts that the existence of all things depends upon the mind; thus, ontological idealism rejects the perspectives of physicalism and dualism. In contrast to materialism, idealism asserts the primacy of consciousness as the origin and prerequisite of all phenomena.

In some contexts, idealism is contrasted with realism. Idealism came under attack from proponents of analytic philosophy, such as G. E. Moore and Bertrand Russell, but its critics also included the new realists and Marxists. However, many aspects and paradigms of idealism still have a large influence on subsequent philosophy.

== Definitions ==
Idealism is a term with several related meanings. It comes via Latin idea from the Ancient Greek idea (ἰδέα) from idein (ἰδεῖν), meaning "to see". The term entered the English language by 1743. The term idealism was first used in the abstract metaphysical sense of the "belief that reality is made up only of ideas" by Christian Wolff in 1747. The term re-entered the English language in this abstract sense by 1796. A. C. Ewing gives this influential definition:

the view that there can be no physical objects existing apart from some experience...provided that we regard thinking as part of experience and do not imply by "experience" passivity, and provided we include under experience not only human experience but the so-called "Absolute Experience" or the experience of a God such as Berkeley postulates.

A more recent definition by Willem deVries sees idealism as "roughly, the genus comprises theories that attribute ontological priority to the mental, especially the conceptual or ideational, over the non-mental." As such, idealism entails a rejection of materialism (or physicalism) as well as the rejection of the mind-independent existence of matter (and as such, also entails a rejection of dualism).

There are two main metaphysical concepts on the position of idealism in contemporary philosophy, depending on whether its thesis is ontological or epistemic:

Ontological idealism is the view which holds that all of reality is in some way mental (or spirit, reason, or will) or at least ultimately grounded in a fundamental basis which is mental. This is a form of metaphysical monism because it holds that there is only one type of thing in existence. The modern paradigm of Western metaphysical idealism is Berkeley's immaterialism. Other such idealists are Hegel, and Bradley.

Epistemological idealism (or "formal" idealism) is a position in epistemology that holds that all knowledge is based on mental structures, not on "things in themselves". Whether a mind-independent reality is accepted or not, all that we have knowledge of are mental phenomena. The main source of Western epistemic idealist arguments is the transcendental idealism of Kant. Other thinkers who have defended epistemic idealist arguments include Ludwig Boltzmann and Brand Blanshard.

Thus, ontological idealism holds that reality itself is non-physical, immaterial, or experiential at its core, while epistemological idealist arguments merely affirm that reality can only be known through ideas and mental structures (without necessarily making metaphysical claims about things in themselves). Because of this, Ewing argued that instead of thinking about these two categories as forms of idealism proper, we should instead speak of epistemic and ontological arguments for idealism.

These two ways of arguing for idealism are sometimes combined to defend a specific type of idealism (as done by Berkeley), but they may also be defended as independent theses by different thinkers. For example, while F. H. Bradley and McTaggart focused on metaphysical arguments, Josiah Royce, and Brand Blanshard developed epistemological arguments.

Furthermore, one might use epistemic arguments, but remain neutral about the metaphysical nature of things in themselves. This metaphysically neutral position, which is not a form of metaphysical idealism proper, may be associated with figures like Rudolf Carnap, Quine, Donald Davidson, and perhaps even Kant himself (though he is difficult to categorize). The most famous kind of epistemic idealism is associated with Kantianism and transcendental idealism, as well as with the related Neo-Kantian philosophies. Transcendental idealists like Kant affirm epistemic idealistic arguments without committing themselves to whether reality as such, the "thing in itself", is ultimately mental.

=== Types of ontological idealism ===
Within ontological idealism, there are numerous further sub-types, including forms of pluralism, which hold that there are many independent mental substances or minds, such as Leibniz' monadology, and various forms of monism or absolute idealism (e.g. Hegelianism or Advaita Vedanta), which hold that the fundamental mental reality is a single unity or is grounded in some kind of singular Absolute. Beyond this, idealists disagree on which aspects of the mental are more metaphysically basic. Platonic idealism affirms that ideal forms are more basic to reality than the things we perceive, while subjective idealists and phenomenalists privilege sensory experiences. Personalism, meanwhile, sees persons or selves as fundamental.

A common distinction is between subjective and objective forms of idealism. Subjective idealists like George Berkeley reject the existence of a mind-independent or "external" world (though not the appearance of such phenomena in the mind). However, not all idealists restrict the real to subjective experience. Objective idealists make claims about a trans-empirical world, but simply deny that this world is essentially divorced from or ontologically prior to mind or consciousness as such. Thus, objective idealism asserts that the reality of experiencing includes and transcends the realities of the object experienced and of the mind of the observer.

Idealism is sometimes categorized as a type of metaphysical anti-realism or scepticism. However, idealists need not reject the existence of an objective reality that we can obtain knowledge of, and can merely affirm that this real natural world is mental. Thus, David Chalmers writes of anti-realist idealisms (which would include Berkeley's) and realist forms of idealism, such as "panpsychist versions of idealism where fundamental microphysical entities are conscious subjects, and on which matter is realized by these conscious subjects and their relations."

Chalmers further outlines the following taxonomy of idealism:

Micro-idealism is the thesis that concrete reality is wholly grounded in micro-level mentality: that is, in mentality associated with fundamental microscopic entities (such as quarks and photons). Macro-idealism is the thesis that concrete reality is wholly grounded in macro-level mentality: that is, in mentality associated with macroscopic (middle-sized) entities such as humans and perhaps non-human animals. Cosmic idealism is the thesis that concrete reality is wholly grounded in cosmic mentality: that is, in mentality associated with the cosmos as a whole or with a single cosmic entity (such as the universe or a deity).

Guyer et al. also distinguish between forms of idealism which are grounded in substance theory (often found in the Anglophone idealisms of the late nineteenth and twentieth centuries) and forms of idealism which focus on activities or dynamic processes (favoured in post-Kantian German philosophy).

== Classical Greek idealism ==
=== Pre-Socratic philosophy ===
There are some precursors of idealism in Ancient Greek Philosophy, though scholars disagree on whether any of these thinkers could be properly labelled "idealist" in the modern sense. One example is Anaxagoras (480 BC), who taught that all things in the universe (apeiron) were set in motion by nous ("mind"). In the Phaedo, Plato quotes him as saying, "it is intelligence [nous] that arranges and causes all things". Similarly, Parmenides famously stated that "thinking and being are the same" in fragment B3 (DK 28B3), where he writes: "For thinking and being are the same" (τὸ γὰρ αὐτὸ νοεῖν ἐστίν τε καὶ εἶναι), which more accurately can be translated as "For apprehending and being are the same" or "For being aware and being are the same" This has led some scholars, such as Hegel and E. D. Phillips, to label Parmenides an idealist.

=== Platonism and neoplatonism ===
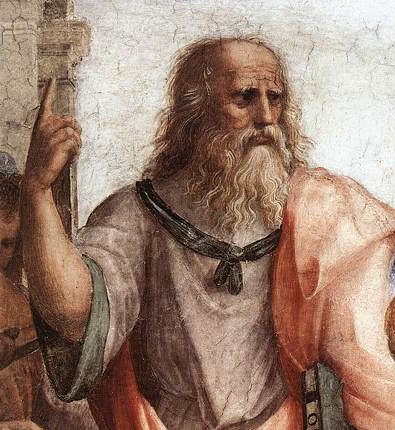
Detail of Plato in The School of Athens, by Raphael

Plato's theory of forms or "ideas" (eide) as described in dialogues like Phaedo, Parmenides and Sophist, describes ideal forms (for example the platonic solids in geometry or abstracts like Goodness and Justice), as perfect beings which "exists-by-itself" (Greek: auto kath' auto), that is, independently of any particular instance (whether physical or in the individual thought of any person). Anything that exists in the world exists by participating in one of these unique ideas, which are nevertheless interrelated causally with the world of becoming, with nature. Arne Grøn calls this doctrine "the classic example of a metaphysical idealism as a transcendent idealism". Nevertheless, Plato holds that matter as perceived by us is real, though transitory, imperfect, and dependent on the eternal ideas for its existence. Because of this, some scholars have seen Plato as a dualist, though others disagree and favor a monist account.

The thought of Plato was widely influential, and later Late Platonist (or Neoplatonist) thinkers developed Platonism in new directions. Plotinus, the most influential of the later Platonists, wrote "Being and Intellect are therefore one nature" (Enneads V.9.8). According to scholars like Nathaniel Alfred Boll and Ludwig Noiré, with Plotinus, a true idealism which holds that only soul or mind exists appears for the first time in Western philosophy. Similarly, for Maria Luisa Gatti, Plotinus' philosophy is a "'contemplationist metaphysics', in which contemplation, as creative, constitutes the reason for the being of everything". For Neoplatonist thinkers, the first cause or principle is the Idea of the Good, i.e. The One, from which everything is derived a hierarchical procession (proodos) (Enn. VI.7.15).

== Idealism in Christianity and Judaism ==
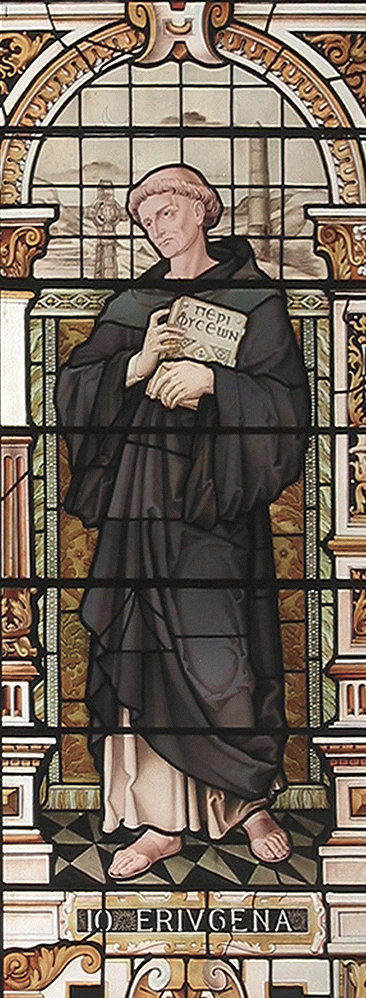
John Scotus Eriugena depicted in a stained glass window

Some Christian theologians have held idealist views, often based on neoplatonism. Christian neoplatonism included figures like Pseudo-Dionysius the Areopagite, and influenced numerous Christian thinkers, including the Cappadocian Fathers and Augustine. Despite the influence of Aristotelian scholasticism from the 12th century onward, there is certainly a sense in which some medieval scholastic philosophers retained influences from the Platonic idealism that came via Augustine. For example, the work of John Scotus Eriugena (c. 800 – c. 877) has been interpreted as an idealistic philosophy by Dermot Moran who writes that for Scotus "all spatiotemporal reality is understood as immaterial, mind dependent, and lacking in independent existence". Scotus thus wrote: "the intellection of all things...is the being of all things".

Idealism was also defended in medieval Jewish philosophy. According to Samuel Lebens, early Mystical rabbis like Yitzchak Luria (1534–72) defended a form of Kabbalistic idealism in which the world was God's dream or a fictional tale told by God.

Later Western theistic idealism such as that of Hermann Lotze offers a theory of the "world ground" in which all things find their unity: it has been widely accepted by Protestant theologians.

Several modern religious movements such as, for example, the organizations within the New Thought Movement and the Unity Church, may be said to have a particularly idealist orientation. The theology of Christian Science includes a form of idealism: it teaches that all that truly exists is God and God's ideas; that the world as it appears to the senses is a distortion of the underlying spiritual reality, a distortion that may be corrected (both conceptually and in terms of human experience) through a reorientation (spiritualization) of thought.

== Idealism in Eastern philosophy ==
There are currents of idealism throughout Indian philosophy, ancient and modern. Some forms of Hindu idealism (like Advaita) defend a type of monism or non-dualism, in which a single consciousness (brahman) is all that exists. However, other traditions defend a theistic pluralism (e.g. Shaiva Siddhanta), in which there are many selves (atman) and one God.

Buddhist idealism, on the other hand, is non-theistic and does not accept the existence of eternal selves (due to their adherence to the theory of not-self).

=== Hindu philosophy ===
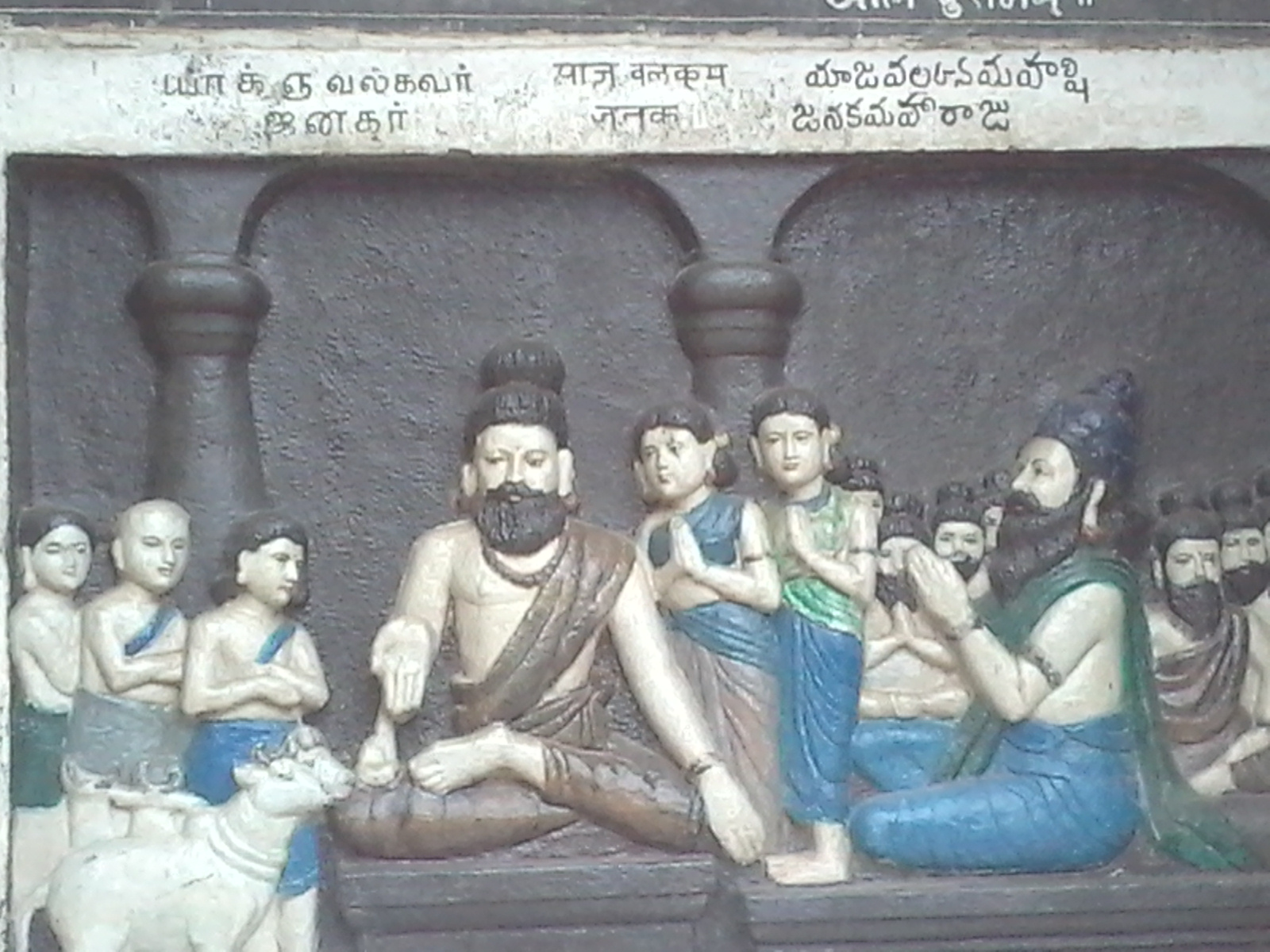
The Upanishadic sage Yājñavalkya (c. possibly 8th century BC) is one of the earliest exponents of idealism, and is a major figure in the Bṛhadāraṇyaka Upaniṣad.

A type of idealistic monism can be seen in the Upanishads, which often describe the ultimate reality of brahman as "being, consciousness, bliss" (Saccidānanda). The Chāndogya Upaniṣad teaches that everything is an emanation of the immortal brahman, which is the essence and source of all things, and is identical with the self (atman). The Bṛhadāraṇyaka Upaniṣad also describes brahman as awareness and bliss, and states that "this great being (mahad bhūtam) without an end, boundless (apāra), [is] nothing but vijñāna [consciousness]".

Idealist notions can be found in different schools of Hindu philosophy, including some schools of Vedanta. Other schools like the Samkhya and Nyaya-Vaisheshika, Mimamsa, Yoga, Vishishtadvaita, Dvaita, and others opposed idealism in favour of realism.

Different schools of Vedanta have different interpretations of brahman-atman, their foundational theory. Advaita Vedanta posits an absolute idealistic monism in which reality is one single absolute existence. Thus, brahman (the ultimate ground of all) is absolutely identical with all atmans (individual selves). Other forms of Vedanta like the Vishishtadvaita of Ramanuja and the Bhedabheda of Bhāskara are not as radical in their non-dualism, accepting that there is a certain difference between individual souls and brahman.

==== Advaita ====
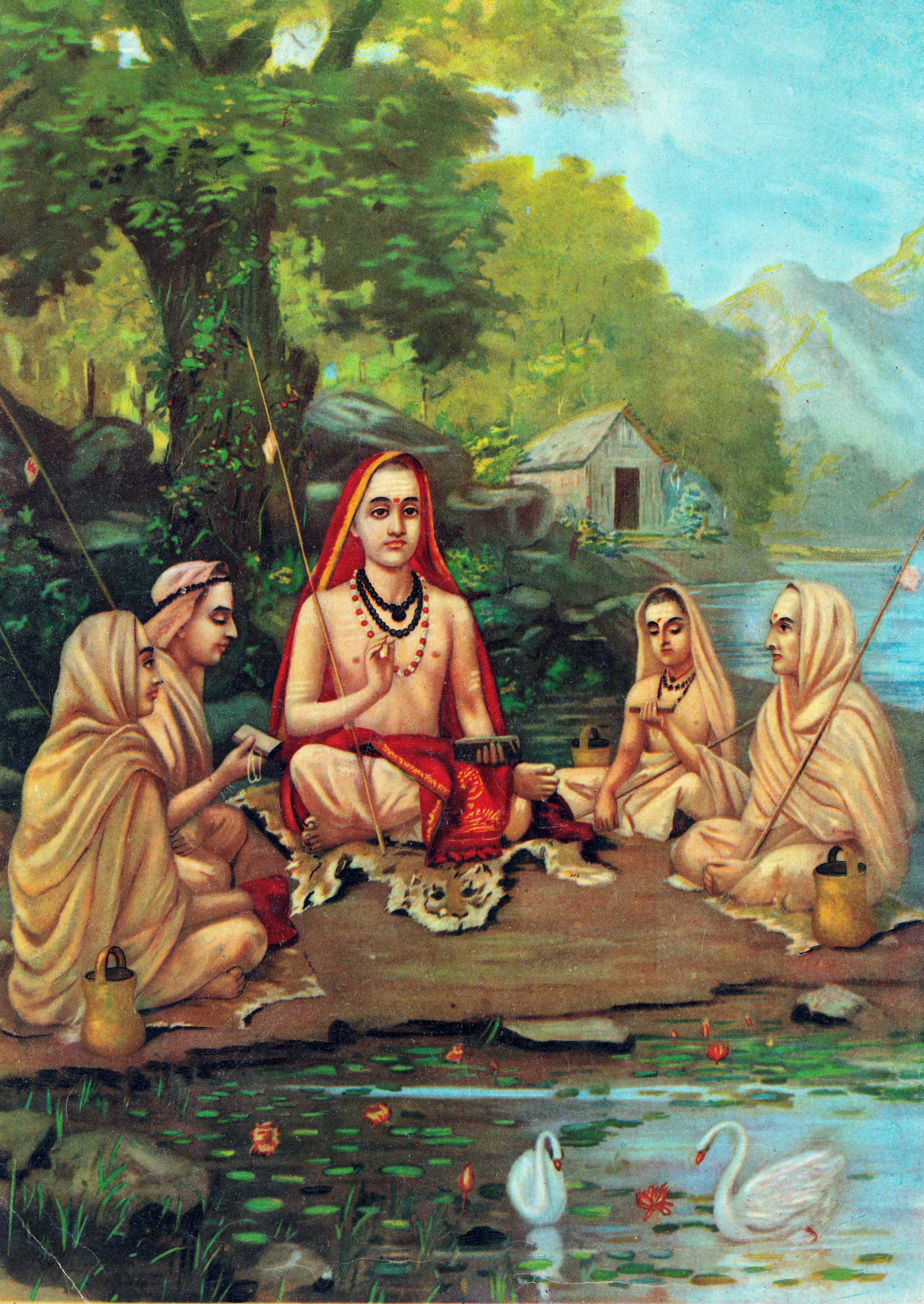
Śaṅkara, by Raja Ravi Varma

The most influential Advaita philosopher was Ādi Śaṅkara (788–820). In his philosophy, brahman is the single non-dual foundation (adhiṣṭhana) for all existence. This reality is independent, self-established, irreducible, immutable, and free of space, time, and causation. In comparison to this reality, the world of plurality and appearances is illusory (maya), an unreal cognitive error (mithya). This includes all individual souls or selves, which are actually unreal and numerically identical to the one brahman.

Śaṅkara did not believe it was possible to prove the view that reality is "one only, without a second" (Chandogya 6.2.1) through independent philosophical reasoning. Instead, he accepts non-duality based on the authority of the Upaniṣads. As such, most of his extant works are scriptural commentaries.

Nevertheless, he did provide various new arguments to defend his theories. A major metaphysical distinction for Śaṅkara is between what changes and may thus be negated (the unreal) and what does not (which is what is truly real). He compares the real to clay (the substantial cause, analogous to brahman) and the unreal to a pot which depends on the clay for its being (analogous to all impermanent things in the universe). By relying on dependence relations and on the reality of persistence, Śaṅkara concludes that metaphysical foundations are more real than their impermanent effects, and that effects are fully reducible and indeed identical to their metaphysical foundation. Through this argument from dependence, Śaṅkara concludes that since all things in the universe undergo change, they must depend on some really existent cause for their being, and this is the one primordial undifferentiated existence (Chandogya Bhāṣya, 6.2.1–2). This one reality is the single cause that is in every object, and everything is not different from this brahman since all things borrow their existence from it. Śaṅkara also provides a cosmogony in which the world arises from an unmanifest state which is like deep dreamless sleep into a state in which īśvara (God) dreams the world into existence. As such, the world is not separate from God's mind.

Śaṅkara's philosophy, along with that of his contemporary Maṇḍana Miśra (c. 8th century AD), is at the foundation of Advaita school. The opponents of this school, however, labelled him a māyāvādin (illusionist) for negating the reality of the world. They also criticized what they saw as a problematic explanation for how the world arises from māyā as an error. For them, if māyā is in brahman, then brahman has ignorance, but if it is not in brahman, then this collapses into a dualism of brahman and māyā.

==== Other idealist schools ====
Perhaps the most influential critic of Advaita was Rāmānuja (c. 1017 – c. 1137), the main philosopher of the competing Viśiṣṭādvaita (qualified non-dual) school. His philosophy affirms the reality of the world and individual selves as well as affirming an underlying unity of all things with God. One of Rāmānuja's critiques of advaita is epistemological. If, as Advaita argues, all cognition other than pure undifferentiated consciousness is based in error, then it follows we would have no knowledge of the very fact that all individual cognition is error (Śrī Bhāṣya, I.i.1).

Furthermore, Rāmānuja also argues against Advaita that individual selves are real and not illusory. This is because the very idea that an individual can be ignorant presupposes the very existence of that individual. Furthermore, since all Vedāntins agree that brahman's nature is knowledge, consciousness and being, to say that brahman is ignorant is absurd, and so it must be individual souls which are ignorant. Thus, there must be individual selves with a metaphysically prior existence who then fall into ignorance (Śrī Bhāṣya, I.i.1.). Selves might be individual, but as the Vedas state, they still share a sense of unity with brahman. For Rāmānuja, this is because selves are distinct modes or qualities in the cosmic body of brahman (and are thus different and yet united with brahman). Brahman, meanwhile, is like the soul in the body of the world. Furthermore, brahman is a theistic creator God for Rāmānuja, who really exists as the union of two deities: Vishnu, and Lakṣmī.

The philosophy of the Tantric tradition of Trika Shaivism is a non-dual theistic idealism. The key thinkers of this philosophical tradition, known as the Pratyabhijñā (Recognition) school, are the Kashmirian philosophers Utpaladeva (c. 900–950 AD) and Abhinavagupta (975–1025 AD). This tradition affirms a non-dual monism which sees God (Shiva) as a single cosmic consciousness. All selves (atman) are one with God, but they have forgotten this, and must recognize their true nature in order to reach liberation.

Unlike in Advaita Vedanta however, the one cosmic consciousness is active and dynamic, consisting of spontaneous vibration (spanda) since it has the quality of absolute freedom (svātāntrya). Through the power (Śakti) of dynamic vibrations, the absolute (Shiva-Śakti, consciousness and its power) creates the world, and so, the world is a real manifestation of absolute consciousness. Thus, in this system, the world and individual selves (which are dynamic, not an unchanging witness) are not an unreal illusion, but are seen as real and active expressions of God's creative freedom.

Idealism has remained influential in modern Hindu philosophy, especially in Neo-Vedanta modernism. Prominent modern defenders include Ram Mohan Roy (1772–1833), Vivekananda (1863–1902), Sarvepalli Radhakrishnan (An Idealist View of Life, 1932) and Aurobindo (1872–1950).

=== Buddhist philosophy ===
Buddhist views reminiscent of idealism appear in Mahayana scriptures like the Explanation of the Profound Secrets, Descent into Laṅka, and Ten Stages Sutra. These theories, known as "mind-only" (cittamatra) or "the consciousness doctrine" (vijñanavada) were mostly associated with the Indian Buddhist philosophers of the Yogācāra school and the related epistemological school (Pramāṇavāda). These figures include: Vasubandhu, Asaṅga, Dignāga, Dharmakīrti, Sthiramati, Dharmapāla, Jñānaśrīmitra, Śaṅkaranandana, and Ratnākaraśānti. Their arguments were a lively subject of debate for Buddhist and non-Buddhist philosophers in India for centuries. These discussions had a lasting influence on the later Buddhist philosophy of East Asian Buddhism and Tibetan Buddhism.

There is some modern scholarly disagreement about whether Indian Yogācāra Buddhism can be said to be a form of idealism. Some writers like philosopher Jay Garfield and German philologist Lambert Schmithausen argue that Indian Yogacarins are metaphysical idealists that reject the existence of a mind independent external world. Others see them as closer to an epistemic idealist like Kant, who holds that our knowledge of the world is simply knowledge of our own concepts and perceptions. However, a major difference here is that while Kant holds that the thing-in-itself is unknowable, Indian Yogacarins held that ultimate reality is knowable, but only through the non-conceptual yogic perception of a highly trained meditative mind. Other scholars like Dan Lusthaus and Thomas Kochumuttom see Yogācāra as a kind of phenomenology of experience which seeks to understand how suffering (dukkha) arises in the mind, not provide a metaphysics.

==== Vasubandhu ====
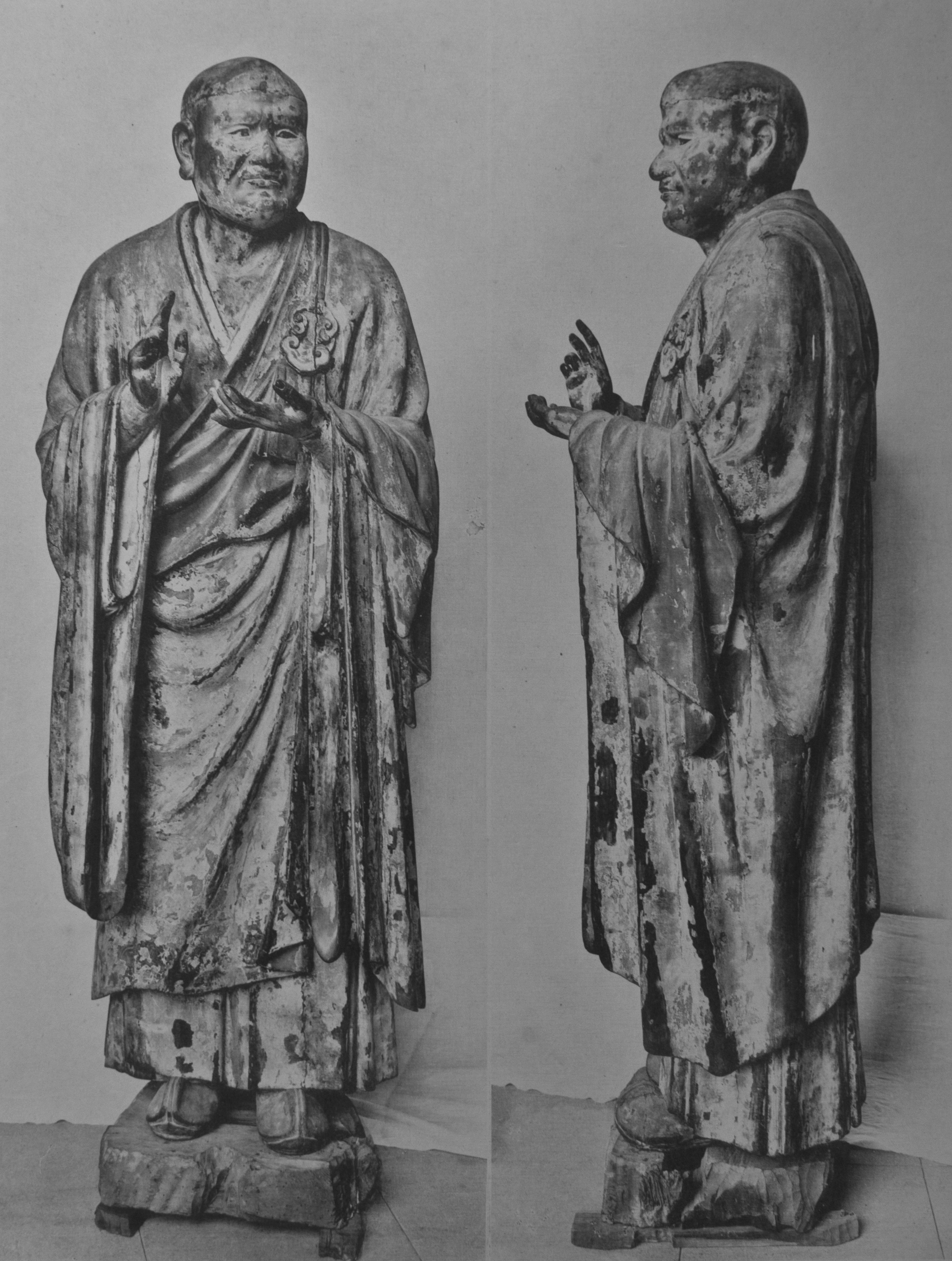
Statue of Vasubandhu (jp. Seshin), Kōfuku-ji, Nara, Japan

Whatever the case, the works of Vasubandhu (fl. c.360) certainly include a refutation of mind-independent "external" objects (Sanskrit: bāhyārtha) and argue that the true nature of reality is beyond subject-object distinctions. He views ordinary conscious experience as deluded in its perceptions of an external world separate from itself (which does not exist), and instead argues that all there is vijñapti (ideas, mental images, conscious appearances, representations). Vasubandhu begins his Twenty verses (Viṃśikā) by affirming that "all this [everything we take to exist] is mere appearance of consciousness [vijñapti], because of the appearance of non-existent objects, just as a man with an eye disease sees non-existent hairs" (Viṃś.1). His main argument against external objects is a critique of the atomist theories of his realist opponents (Nyāya and Abhidharma theorists).

Vasubandhu also responds to three objections to idealism which indicate his view that all appearances are caused by mind: (1) the issue of spatio-temporal continuity, (2) accounting for intersubjectivity, and (3) the causal efficacy of matter on subjects. For the first and third objections, Vasubandhu responds by arguing that dreams can also include spatio-temporal continuity, regularity and causal efficacy. Regarding intersubjectivity, Vasubandhu appeals to shared karma as well as mind-to-mind causation. After answering these objections, Vasubandhu argues that idealism is a better explanation than realism for everyday experiences. To do this, he relies on the Indian "Principle of Lightness" (an appeal to parsimony like Occam's Razor) and argues that idealism is the "lighter" theory since it posits a smaller number of entities. This is thus an argument from simplicity and an inference to the best explanation (i.e. an abductive argument).

As such, he affirms that our usual experience of being a self (ātman) that knows objects is an illusory construct, and this constitutes what he calls the "imagined nature" aspect of reality.

Thus, for Vasubandhu, there is a more fundamental "root consciousness" that is empty of subject-object distinctions and yet originates all experiences "just as waves originate on water" (Thirty Verses, Triṃś.17). However, Vasubandhu sees this philosophy as a mere conventional description, since ultimate reality is "inconceivable" (Triṃś.29), an ineffable and non-conceptual "thusness" which cannot be fully captured in words and can only be known through meditative realization by yogis ("yogacaras", hence the name of his school). This is why certain modern interpreters, like Jonathan Gold, see Vasubandhu's thought as a "conventionalist idealism" or even a type of epistemic idealism like Kant's (and not a full blown objective idealism).

==== The Buddhist epistemologists ====
Buddhist arguments against external objects were further expanded and sharpened by later figures like Dignāga (fl. 6th century) and Dharmakīrti (fl. 7th century) who led an epistemological turn in medieval Indian philosophy.

Dignāga's main arguments against external objects (specifically, atomic particles) are found in his Ālambanaparīkṣā (Examination of the Object of Consciousness). Dignāga argues that for something to be an object (ālambana) of a conscious state, that object must be causally related to the consciousness and it must resemble that consciousness (in appearance or content). Dignāga then attempts to show that realism about external particulars cannot satisfy these two conditions. Since individual atoms lack a resemblance to the conscious state they supposedly cause, they cannot be the object of cognition. Furthermore, aggregates of atoms also cannot be the object, since they are merely a conceptual grouping of individual atoms (and thus, unreal), and only atoms have causal efficacy.

Dharmakīrti's view is summed up in the Pramānaṿārttika (Commentary on Epistemology) as follows: "cognition experiences itself, and nothing else whatsoever. Even the particular objects of perception, are by nature just consciousness itself". One of his main arguments for idealism is the inference from "the necessity of things only ever being experienced together with experience" (Sanskrit: sahopalambhaniyama). Dharmakīrti consicely states this argument in the Ascertainment of Epistemology (Pramāṇaviniścaya): "blue and the consciousness of blue are not different, because they must always be apprehended together". Since an object is never found independently of consciousness, objects cannot be mind-independent. This can be read as an epistemological argument for idealism which attempts to show there is no good reason (empirically or inferentially) to accept the existence of external objects.

Most of the Yogācāra thinkers and epistemologists (including Dharmakīrti) defended the existence of multiple mindstreams, and even tackled the problem of other minds. As such, thinkers like Dharmakīrti were pluralists who held there were multiple minds in the world (in this they differ from Hindu Advaita thinkers who held there was a single cosmic consciousness). However, there was a certain sub-school of Indian Buddhists, exemplified by Prajñakaragupta, Jñānaśrīmitra (fl. 975–1025 C.E.) and Ratnakīrti (11th century AD) who were not pluralists. In his Refutation of Other mindstreams (Santānāntaradūṣaṇa), Ratnakīrti argues that the existence of other minds cannot be established ultimately, and as such ultimate reality must be an undifferentiated non-dual consciousness (vijñānādvaita). This monistic interpretation of Yogācāra is known as the Citrādvaitavāda school (the view of variegated non-duality) since it sees reality as a single multifaceted non-dual luminosity (citrādvaitaprakāśa).

=== Chinese philosophy ===
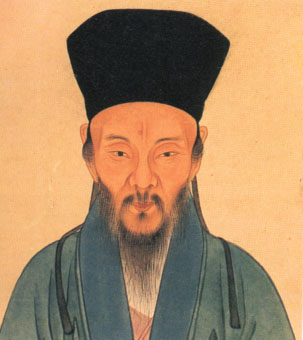
Wang Yangming, a leading Neo-Confucian scholar during the Ming and a founder of the "school of mind"

In Chinese philosophy, Yogācāra idealism was defended by Chinese Buddhists like Xuanzang (602–664) and his students Kuiji (632–682) and Wŏnch'ŭk (613–696). Xuanzang had studied Yogācāra Buddhism at the great Indian university of Nalanda under the Indian philosopher Śīlabhadra. His work, especially The Demonstration of Consciousness-only, was pivotal in the establishment of East Asian Yogācāra Buddhism (also known as "consciousness only", Ch: Weishi 唯識), which in turn influenced East Asian Buddhist thought in general.

Yogācāra Buddhism also influenced the thought of other Chinese Buddhist philosophical traditions, such as Huayan, Tiantai, Pure Land, and Zen. Many Chinese Buddhist traditions like Huayan, Zen, and Tiantai were also strongly influenced by an important text called the Awakening of Faith in the Mahāyāna, which synthesized consciousness-only idealism with buddha-nature thought. This text promoted an influential theory of mind which holds that all phenomena are manifestations of the "One Mind". Some scholars have seen this as an ontological monism. One passage from the text states: "the three worlds are illusory constructs, created by the mind alone" and "all dharmas are produced from the mind's giving rise to false thoughts". Jorgensen et al. note that this indicates metaphysical idealism. The new philosophical trend ushered in by the Awakening of Faith was resisted by some Chinese Yogācāra thinkers, and the debates between the Yogācāra school of Xuanzang and those who instead followed the doctrines of the Awakening of Faith continued until the modern era. These debates happened in China as well as in Japan and Korea.

The doctrine that all phenomena arise from an ultimate principle, the One Mind, was adapted by the influential Huayan school, whose thought is exemplified by thinkers such as Fazang (643–712) and Zongmi (780–841). This tradition also promoted a kind of holism which sees every phenomenon in the cosmos as interfused and interconnected with every other phenomenon. Chinese scholars like Yu-lan Fung and Wing-tsit Chan see Huayan philosophy as a form of idealism, though other scholars have defended alternative interpretations. According to Wing-tsit Chan, since Huayan patriarch Fazang sees the One Mind as the basis for all things, including the external world, his system is one of objective idealism. A key distinction between Huayan's view of the world and that of the Yogācāra school is that in Huayan, there is a single intersubjective world (which nevertheless arises from mind), while Yogācāra holds that each mindstream projects its own world out of its underlying root consciousness.

Chinese Buddhist idealism also influenced Confucian philosophy through the work of thinkers like the Ming era (1368–1644) neo-confucian Wang Yangming (1472–1529). Wang's thought has been interpreted as a kind of idealism. According to Wang, the ultimate principle or pattern (lǐ) of the whole universe is identical with the mind, which forms one body or substance (yì tǐ) with "Heaven, Earth, and the myriad creatures" of the world. Wang argues that only this view can explain the fact that human beings experience innate care and benevolence for others as well as a sense of care for inanimate objects. Wang's thought, along with that of Lu Xiangshan, led to the creation of the School of Mind, an important Neo-Confucian tradition which emphasized these idealist views.

Yogācāra idealism saw a revival in the 20th century, associated figures like Yang Wenhui (1837–1911), Taixu, Liang Shuming, Ouyang Jingwu (1870–1943), Wang Xiaoxu (1875–1948), and Lu Cheng. Modern Chinese thinkers associated with consciousness-only linked the philosophy with Western philosophy (especially Hegelian and Kantian thought) and modern science. A similar trend occurred among some Japanese philosophers like Inoue Enryō, who linked East Asian philosophies like Huayan with the philosophy of Hegel.

Both modern Chinese Buddhists and New Confucian thinkers participated in this revival of consciousness-only studies. The thought of New Confucians like Xiong Shili, Ma Yifu, Tang Junyi and Mou Zongsan, was influenced by Yogācāra consciousness-only philosophy, as well as by the metaphysics of the Awakening of Faith in the Mahāyāna, though their thought also contained many critiques of Buddhist philosophy.

== Modern philosophy ==
It is only in the modern era that idealism became a central topic of argumentation among Western philosophers. This was also when the term "idealism" was coined by Christian Wolff (1679–1754), though previous thinkers like Berkeley had argued for it under different names.

Idealistic tendencies can be found in the work of some rationalist philosophers, like Leibniz and Nicolas Malebranche (though they did not use the term). Malebranche argued that Platonic ideas (which exist only in the mind of God) are the ultimate ground of our experiences and of the physical world, a view that prefigures later idealist positions. Some scholars also see Leibniz' philosophy as approaching idealism. Guyer et al. write that "his view that the states of monads can be only perceptions and appetitions (desires) suggests a metaphysical argument for idealism, while his famous thesis that each monad represents the entire universe from its own point of view might be taken to be an epistemological ground for idealism, even if he does not say as much." However, there is still much debate in the contemporary scholarly literature on whether Leibniz can be considered an idealist.

=== Subjective idealism ===
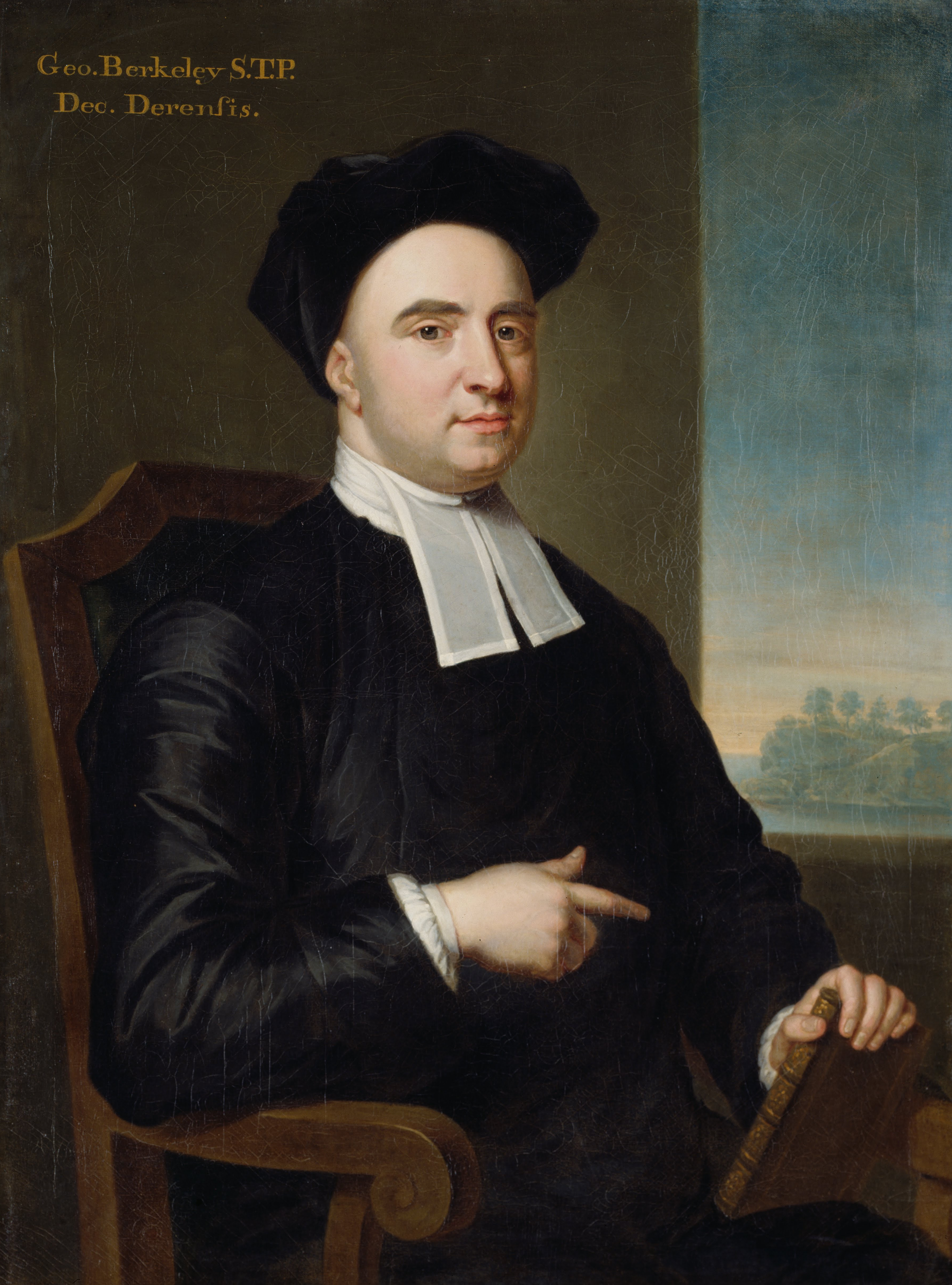
1727 portrait of George Berkeley by John Smibert

One famous proponent of modern idealism was George Berkeley (1685–1753), an Anglo-Irish philosopher who defended a theory he called immaterialism. This kind of idealism is sometimes also called subjective idealism (also known as phenomenalistic idealism).

Berkeley held that objects exist only to the extent that a mind perceives them and thus the physical world does not exist outside of mind. Berkeley's epistemic argument for this view (found in his A Treatise Concerning the Principles of Human Knowledge) rests on the premise that we can only know ideas in the mind. Thus, knowledge does not extend to mind-independent things (Treatise, 1710: Part I, §2). From this, Berkeley holds that "the existence of an idea consists in being perceived", thus, regarding ideas "their esse is percipi", that is, to be is to be perceived (1710: Part I, §3).

Based on this restriction of existence to only what is being perceived, Berkeley holds that it is meaningless to think that there could exist objects that are not being perceived. This is the basic idea behind what has been called Berkeley's "master argument" for idealism, which states that "one cannot conceive of anything existing unconceived because in trying to do so one is still conceiving of the object" (1710: Part I, §23). As to the question of how objects which are currently not being perceived by individual minds persist in the world, Berkeley answers that a single eternal mind keeps all of physical reality stable (and causes ideas in the first place), and this is God.

Berkeley also argued for idealism based on a second key premise: "an idea can be like nothing but an idea" and as such there cannot be any things without or outside mind. This is because for something to be like something else, there must be something they have in common. If something is mind-independent, then it must be completely different from ideas. Thus, there can be no relation between ideas in the mind and things "without the mind", since they are not alike. As Berkeley writes, "...I ask whether those supposed originals or external things, of which our ideas are the pictures or representations, be themselves perceivable or no? if they are, then they are ideas, and we have gained our point; but if you say they are not, I appeal to any one whether it be sense, to assert a colour is like something which is invisible; hard or soft, like something which is intangible; and so of the rest." (1710: Part I, §8).

A similar idealistic philosophy was developed at around the same time as Berkeley by Anglican priest and philosopher Arthur Collier (Clavis Universalis: Or, A New Inquiry after Truth, Being a Demonstration of the Non-Existence, or Impossibility, of an External World, 1713). Collier claimed to have developed his view that all matter depends on mind independently of Berkeley. Paul Brunton, a British philosopher and mystic, also taught a similar type of idealism called "mentalism".

A. A. Luce and John Foster are other subjective idealists. Luce, in Sense without Matter (1954), attempts to bring Berkeley up to date by modernizing his vocabulary and putting the issues he faced in modern terms, and treats the Biblical account of matter and the psychology of perception and nature. Foster's The Case for Idealism argues that the physical world is the logical creation of natural, non-logical constraints on human sense-experience. Foster's latest defence of his views (phenomenalistic idealism) is in his book A World for Us: The Case for Phenomenalistic Idealism.

Critics of subjective idealism include Bertrand Russell's popular 1912 book The Problems of Philosophy, Australian philosopher David Stove, Alan Musgrave, and John Searle.

=== Epistemic idealism ===
==== Kant's Transcendental idealism ====
Transcendental idealism was developed by Immanuel Kant (1724–1804), who was the first philosopher to label himself an "idealist". In his Critique of Pure Reason, Kant was clear in distinguishing his view (which he also called "critical" and "empirical realism") from Berkeley's idealism and from Descartes's views. Kant's philosophy holds that we only have knowledge of our experiences, which consist jointly of intuitions and concepts. As such, our experiences reflect our cognitive structures, not the intrinsic nature of mind-independent things. This means even time and space are not properties of things in themselves (i.e., mind-independent reality underlying appearances).

Since it focuses on the mind-dependent nature of knowledge and not on metaphysics per se, transcendental idealism is a type of epistemological idealism. Unlike metaphysical forms of idealism, Kant's transcendental idealism does not deny the existence of mind-independent things or affirm that they must be mental. He thus accepts that we can conceive of external objects as distinct from our representations of them. However, he argues that we cannot know what external objects are "in themselves". As such, Kant's system can be called idealist in some respects (e.g. regarding space and time) and also realist in that he accepts there must be some mind-independent reality (even if we cannot know its ultimate nature and thus must remain agnostic about this). Kant's system also affirms the reality of a free truly existent self and of a God, which he sees as being possible because the non-temporal nature of the thing-in-itself allows for a radical freedom and genuine spontaneity.

Kant's main argument for his idealism, found throughout the Critique of Pure Reason, is based on the key premise that we always represent objects in space and time through our a priori intuitions (knowledge which is independent from any experience). Thus, according to Kant, space and time can never represent any "property at all of any things in themselves nor any relations of them to each other, i.e., no determination of them that attaches to objects themselves and that would remain even if one were to abstract from all subjective conditions of intuition" (CPuR A 26/B 42).

Kant's main point is that since our mental representations have spatio-temporal structure, we have no real grounds for positing that the real objects our mind represents in this way also have spatio-temporal structure in themselves. Kant makes this argument in different parts of the Critique, such as when he asks rhetorically:

If there did not lie in you a faculty for intuiting a priori; if this subjective condition were not at the same time the universal a priori condition under which alone the object of ... intuition is possible; if the object ([e.g.,] the triangle) were something in itself without relation to your subject: then how could you say that what necessarily lies in your subjective conditions for constructing a triangle must also necessarily pertain to the triangle in itself. (A 48/B 65)

Throughout his career, Kant laboured to distinguish his philosophy from metaphysical idealism, as some of his critics charged him with being a Berkeleyan idealist. He argued that even if we cannot know how things are in themselves, we do know they must exist, and that we know this "through the representations which their influence on our sensibility provides for us." In the second edition of his Critique, he even inserted a "refutation of idealism". For Kant, "the perception of this persistent thing is possible only through a thing outside me and not through the mere representation of a thing outside me."

==== Neo-Kantianism ====
Kant's philosophy was extremely influential on European enlightenment thinkers (and counter-enlightenment ones as well), and his ideas were widely discussed and debated. Transcendental idealism was also defended by later Kantian philosophers who adopted his method, such as Karl Leonhard Reinhold and Jakob Sigismund Beck.

The mid-19th century saw a revival of Kantian philosophy, which became known as Neo-Kantianism, with its call of "Back to Kant". This movement was especially influential on 19th-century German academic philosophy (and also continental philosophy as a whole). Some important figures include: Hermann Cohen (1842–1918), Wilhelm Windelband (1848–1914), Ernst Cassirer, Hermann von Helmholtz, Eduard Zeller, Leonard Nelson, Heinrich Rickert, and Friedrich Albert Lange. A key concern of the Neo-Kantians was to update Kantian epistemology, particularly in order to provide an epistemic basis for the modern sciences (all while avoiding ontology altogether, whether idealist or materialist). Neo-Kantianism rejected metaphysical idealism while also accepting the basic Kantian premise that "our experience of reality is always structured by the distinctive features of human mentality." Hence, Cassirer defended an epistemic worldview that held that one cannot reduce reality to any independent or substantial object (physical or mental), instead, there are only different ways of describing and organizing experience.

Neo-Kantianism influenced the work of the Vienna Circle and its ambassadors to the Anglophone world, Rudolf Carnap (1891–1970) and Hans Reichenbach. Charles Bernard Renouvier was the first philosopher in France to formulate a system based on Kant's critical idealism, which he termed Neo-criticism (néo-criticisme). It is a transformation rather than a continuation of Kantianism.

=== German idealism ===
Several important German thinkers who were deeply influenced by Kant are the German idealists: Johann Gottlieb Fichte (1762–1814), Friedrich Wilhelm Joseph Schelling (1775–1854), and Georg Friedrich Hegel (1770–1831). Though heavily drawing on Kant, these thinkers were not transcendental idealists as such, and they sought to move beyond the idea that things in themselves are unknowable –an idea they considered as opening the door to scepticism and nihilism.

Post-Kantian German idealists thus rejected transcendental idealism by arguing against the opposition of a mind-independent world of being and a subjective world of mental constructs (or the separation between the knowledge and what is known, between subject and object, real and ideal). This new German idealism was distinguished by an "inseparability of being and thinking" and "a dynamic conception of self-consciousness" that sees reality as spontaneous conscious activity and its expressions. As such, this kind of metaphysical idealism, focused on dynamic processes and forces, was opposed to older forms of idealism, which based itself on substance theory (which these Germans labelled "dogmatism").

The first thinker to elaborate this type of dynamic idealism was J. G. Fichte (Doctrine of Wissenschaft, 1810–1813). For Fichte, the primordial act at the ground of being is called "self-positing". Fichte argues that self-consciousness or the I is a spontaneous, unconditioned self-creating act which he also called the deed-act (tathandlung). Fichte argues that positing something unconditioned and independent at the ground of all is the only way to avoid an epistemic infinite regress. According to Fichte, this "I am" or "absolute subject" which "originally posits its own being absolutely" (Doctrine I, 2: 261), "is at the same time the actor and the product of the act; the actor, and that which the activity brings forth; act and deed are one and the same" (Doctrine I, 2: 259). Fichte also argues that this "I" has the capacity to "counter-posit" a "not-I", leading to a subject-object relationship. The I also has a third capacity Fichte calls "divisibility", which allows for the existence of plurality in the world, which however, must be understood as manifestations of the "I-activity", and as being "within the I".

Fichte's philosophy was adopted by Schelling, who defended this new idealism as a full monistic ontology which tried to account for all of nature which he would eventually name "absolute idealism". For Schelling, reality is an "original unity" (ursprüngliche Einheit) or a "primordial totality" (uranfängliche Ganzheit) of opposites. This is an absolute which he described as an "eternal act of cognition" is disclosed in subjective and objective modes, the world of ideas and nature.

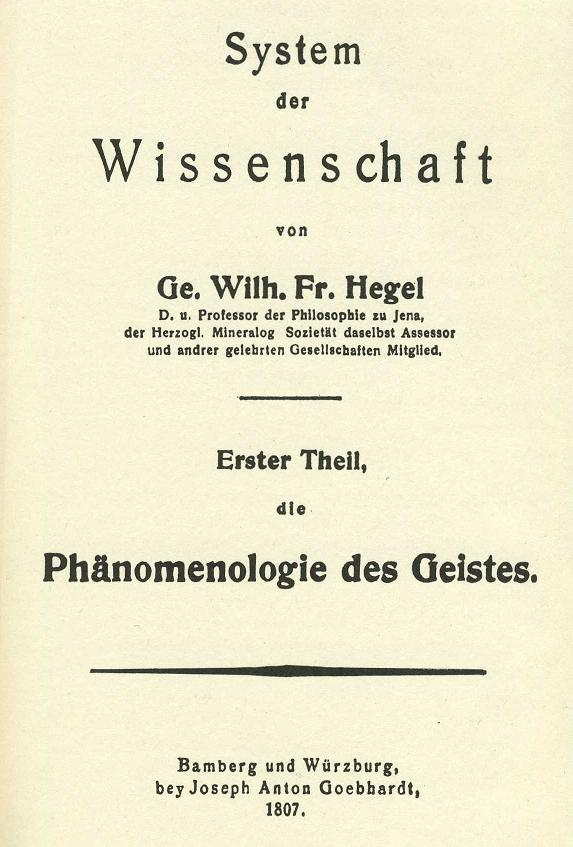
Hegel's The Phenomenology of Spirit was a pivotal work of German absolute idealism.

G. W. F. Hegel also defended a dynamic absolute idealism that sees existence as an all-inclusive whole. However, his system differs from his predecessors' in that it is not grounded on some initial subject, mind, or "I" and tries to move beyond all bifurcation subject and object, of the dualism between thinking and being (which for Hegel just leads to various contradictions). As such, Hegel's system is an ontological monism fundamentally based on a unity between being and thought, subject and object, which he saw as being neither materialistic realism nor subjective idealism (which still stands in opposition to materialism and thus remains stuck in the subject-object distinction).

In his Phenomenology of Spirit (1807), Hegel provides an epistemological argument for idealism, focusing on proving the "metaphysical priority of identities over and against their opposed elements". Hegel's argument begins with his conception of knowledge, which he holds is a relation between a claim about a subject and an object that allows for a correspondence between their structural features (and is thus a type of correspondence theory). Hegel argues that if knowledge is possible, real objects must also have a similar structure as thought (without, however, being reduced to thoughts). If not, there could be no correspondence between what the object is and what a subject believes to be true about the object. For Hegel, any system in which the subject that knows and the object which is known are structurally independent would make the relations necessary for knowledge impossible. Hegel also argues that finite qualities and objects depend on other finite things to determine them. An infinite thinking being, on the other hand, would be more self-determining and hence most fully real.

Hegel argued that a careful analysis of the act of knowledge would eventually lead to an understanding of the unity of subjects and the objects in a single all-encompassing whole. In this system, experiences are not independent of the thing in itself (as in Kant) but are manifestations grounded in a metaphysical absolute, which is also experiential (but since it resists the experiential subject, can be known through this resistance). Thus, our own experiences can lead us to an insight into the thing in itself. Furthermore, since reality is a unity, all knowledge is ultimately self-knowledge, or as Hegel puts it, it is the subject being "in the other with itself" (im Anderen bei sich selbst sein). Since all things have spirit (Geist), a philosopher can attain what he termed "absolute knowing" (absolutes Wissen), which is the knowledge that all things are ultimately manifestations of an infinite absolute spirit.

Later, in his Science of Logic (1812–1814), Hegel further develops a metaphysics in which the real and objective activity of thinking unfolds itself in numerous ways (as objects and subjects). This ultimate activity of thought, which is not the activity of specific subjects, is an immediate fact, a given (vorhandenes), which is self-standing and self-organizing. In manifesting the entire world, the absolute enacts a process of self-actualization through a grand structure or master logic, which is what Hegel calls "reason" (Vernunft), and which he understands as a teleological reality.

Hegelianism was deeply influential throughout the 19th century, even as some Hegelians (like Marx) rejected idealism. Later idealist Hegelians include Friedrich Adolf Trendelenburg (1802–72) and Rudolf Hermann Lotze (1817–81).

=== Schopenhauer's philosophy ===
The philosophy of Arthur Schopenhauer owes much to the thought of Kant and to that of the German idealists, which he nevertheless strongly criticizes. Schopenhauer maintains Kant's idealist epistemology which sees even space, time and causality as mere mental representations (vorstellungen) conditioned by the subjective mind. However, he replaces Kant's unknowable thing-in-itself with an absolute reality underlying all ideas that is a single irrational Will, a view that he saw as directly opposed to Hegel's rational Spirit. This philosophy is laid out in The World as Will and Representation (WWR 1818, 2nd ed. 1844).

Schopenhauer accepts Kant's view that there can be no appearances without there being something which appears. However, unlike Kant, Schopenhauer writes that "we have immediate cognition of the thing in itself when it appears to us as our own body". (WWR §6, pp. 40–1). Schopenhauer argues that, even though we do experience our own bodies through the categories of space, time and causality, we also experience it in another more direct and internal way through the experience of willing. This immediate experience reveals that it is will alone which "gives him the key to his own appearance, reveals to him the meaning and shows him the inner workings of his essence, his deeds, his movements" (WWR §18, p. 124). Thus, for Schopenhauer, it is desire, a "dark, dull driving", which is at the root of action, not reason. Furthermore, since this is the only form of insight we have of the inner essence of any reality, we must apply this insight "to [the] appearances in the inorganic [and organic] world as well." Schopenhauer compares willing with many natural forces. As such, Will is "a name signifying the being in itself of every thing in the world and the sole kernel of every appearance" (WWR §23, pp. 142–3).

According to Schopenhauer, irrational willing is the most foundational reality, and as a result, life is filled with frustration, irrationality, and disappointment. This is the metaphysical foundation of his pessimistic philosophy of life. He argued the best humans can hope for is to deny, and briefly escape, the incessant force of the Will, through art, aesthetic experience, asceticism, and compassion.

=== Gentile's actual idealism ===
Actual idealism is a form of idealism developed by Giovanni Gentile which argues that reality is the ongoing act of thinking, or in Italian "pensiero pensante," and thus, only thoughts exist. He further argued that our combined thoughts defined and produced reality. Gentile also nationalizes this idea, holding that the state is a composition of many minds coming together to construct reality. Giovanni Gentile was a key supporter of fascism, regarded by many as the "philosopher of fascism". His idealist theory argued for the unity of all society under one leader, which allows it to act as one body.

=== Anglo-American Idealism ===
Idealism was widespread in Anglo-American philosophy during the nineteenth and twentieth centuries. It was the dominant metaphysics in the English-speaking world during the last decades of the nineteenth century and the beginning of the twentieth century. During this time, the defenders of British idealism made significant contributions to all fields of philosophy. However, other philosophers, like McTaggart, broke from this trend and instead defended a pluralistic idealism in which the ultimate reality is a plurality of minds.

Many Anglo-American idealists were influenced by Hegelianism, but they also drew on Kant, Plato and Aristotle. Key figures of this transatlantic movement include many of the British idealists, such as T. H. Green (1836–1882), F. H. Bradley (1846–1924), Bernard Bosanquet (1848–1923), J. H. Muirhead (1855–1940), H. H. Joachim (1868–1938), A. E. Taylor (1869–1945), R. G. Collingwood (1889–1943), G. R. G. Mure (1893–1979) and Michael Oakeshott. American idealist philosophers include Josiah Royce (1855–1916) and Brand Blanshard (1892–1987).

==== British absolute idealism ====
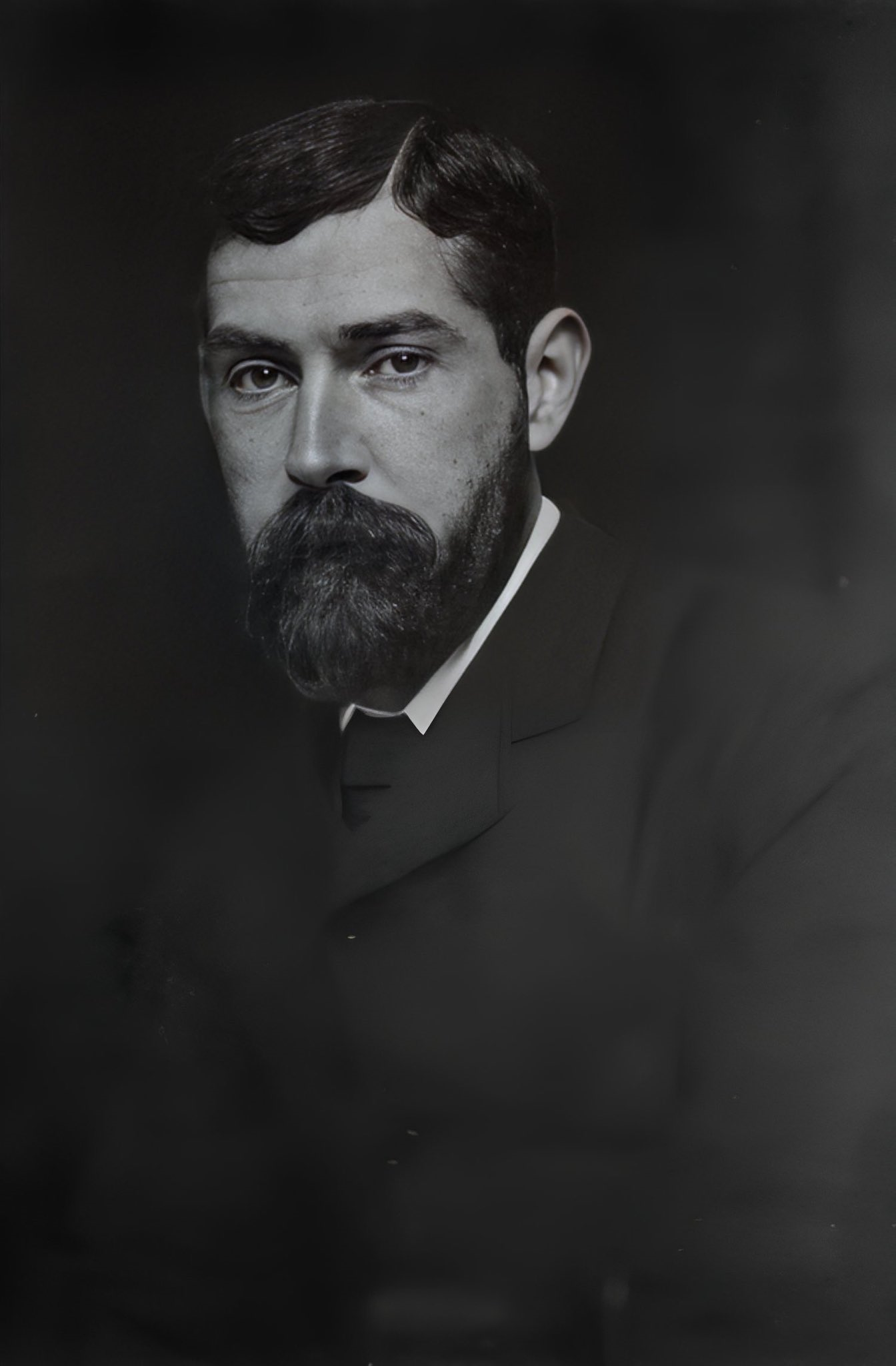
F.H. Bradley, a leading British absolute idealist

One of the early influential British idealists was Thomas Hill Green, known for his posthumous Prolegomena to Ethics. Green argues for an idealist metaphysics in this text as a foundation for free will and ethics. In a Kantian fashion, Green first argues that knowledge consists in seeing relations in consciousness, and that any sense of something being "real" or "objective" has no meaning outside of consciousness. He then argues that experience as consciousness of related events "cannot be explained by any natural history, properly so called" and thus "the understanding which presents an order of nature to us is in principle one with an understanding which constitutes that order itself."

Green then further argues that individual human beings are aware of an order of relations which extends beyond the bounds of their individual mind. For Green, this greater order must be in a larger transpersonal intelligence, while the world is "a system of related facts" which is made possible and revealed to individual beings by the larger intelligence. Furthermore, Green also holds that participation in the transpersonal mind is constituted by the apprehension of a portion of the overall order by animal organisms. As such, Green accepts the reality of biological bodies when he writes that "in the process of our learning to know the world, an animal organism, which has its history in time, gradually becomes the vehicle of an eternally complete consciousness."

Another paradigmatic British absolute idealist is Francis Herbert Bradley, who affirms that "the Absolute is not many; there are no independent reals". This absolute reality "is one system, and ... its contents are nothing but sentient experience. It will hence be a single and all-inclusive experience, which embraces every partial diversity in concord." Bradley presents an anti-realist idealism which rejects the ultimate reality of relations, which for him are mere appearance, "a makeshift, a mere practical compromise, most necessary, but in the end most indefensible."

Bradley presented his idealism in his Appearance and Reality (1893) by arguing that the ideas we use to understand reality are contradictory. He deconstructs numerous ideas, including primary and secondary qualities, substances and attributes, quality and relation, space, time and causality and the self. Most famously, Bradley argued that any ultimate distinction between qualities and relations is untenable since "qualities are nothing without relations" since "their plurality depends on relation, and, without that relation, they are not distinct. But, if not distinct, then not different, and therefore not qualities." Furthermore, for Bradley, the same thing turns out to be true of relations, and of both taken together, since for a relation to relate to a quality, it would then require a further relation. As such, qualities and relations are appearance, not ultimate truth, since "ultimate reality is such that it does not contradict itself".

Even though all appearances are "not truth", it is still possible to have true knowledge of ultimate reality, which must be a unity beyond contradictions but which still allows for diversity. Bradley thinks that this character of reality as a diverse unity is revealed to us in sentient experience, since our various experiences must be grounded and caused by some undifferentiated and pre-abstract reality. However, he also admits "our complete inability to understand this concrete unity in detail".

==== American idealism ====
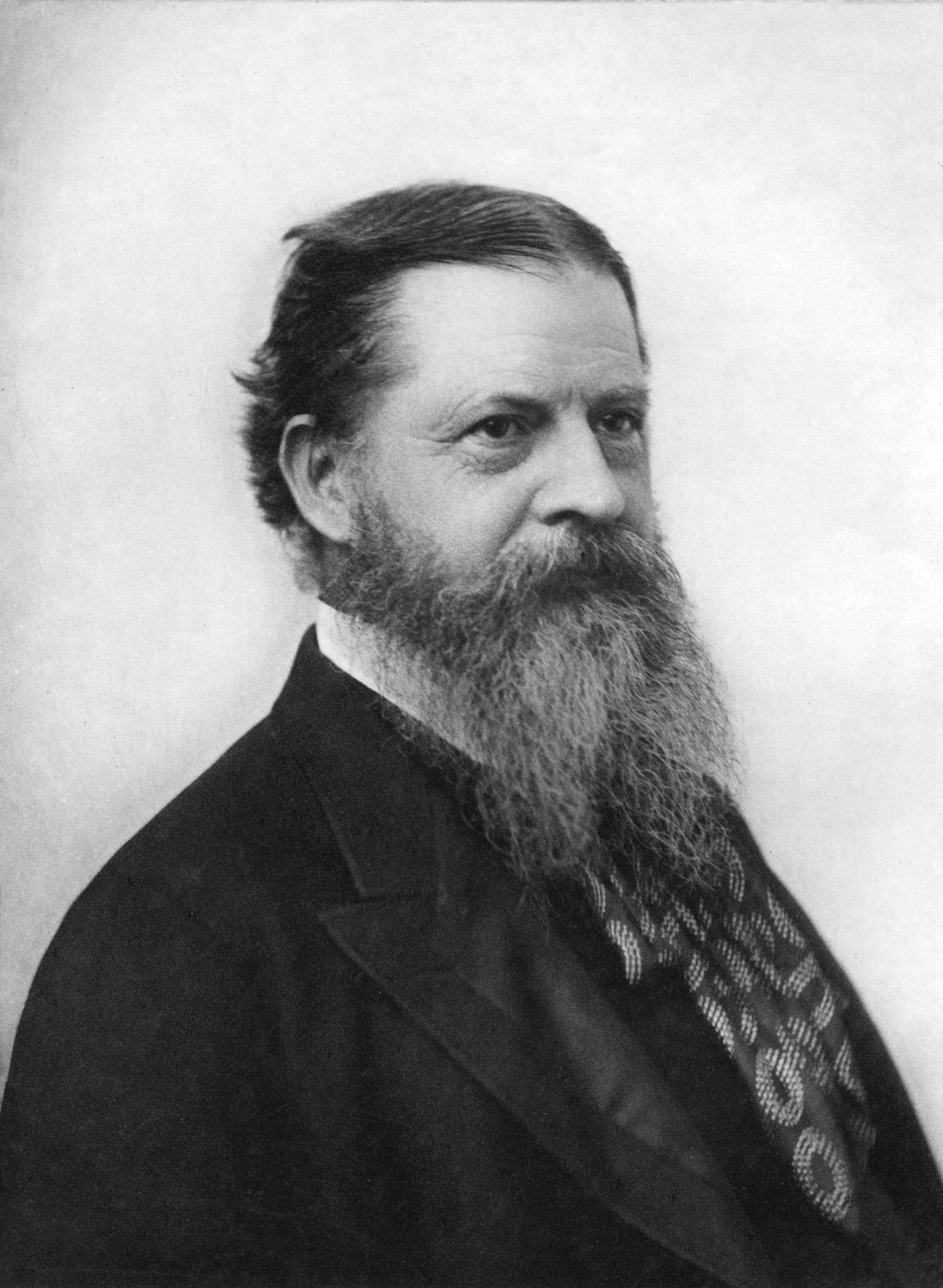
Charles Sanders Peirce

Idealism also became popular in the United States with thinkers like Charles Sanders Peirce (1839–1914), who defended an "objective idealism" in which, as he put it, "matter is effete mind, inveterate habits becoming physical laws". Peirce initially defended a type of representationalism alongside his form of Pragmatism which was metaphysically neutral since it is "no doctrine of metaphysics". However, in later years (after c.1905), Peirce defended an objective idealism which held that the universe evolved from a state of maximum spontaneous freedom (which he associated with mind) into its present state where matter were merely "congealed" mind. In arguing for this view, he followed the classic idealist premise that states there must be a metaphysical equality (an isomorphism) between thought and being, and as such, "the root of all being is One". A key feature of Peirce's idealism is "Tychism", which he defined as "the doctrine that absolute chance is a factor of the universe." This allows for an element of chance or indeterminism in the universe which allows for cosmological evolution.

Under the influence of Peirce, it was Josiah Royce (1855–1916) who became the leading American idealist at the turn of the century. Royce's idealism incorporated aspects of Peirce's Pragmatism and is defended in his The Spirit of Modern Philosophy (1892). One of Royce's arguments for idealism is his argument from meaning, which states the possibility of there being meaning at all requires an identity between what is meant (ordinary objects) and what makes meaning (ordinary subjects).

In his The World and the Individual (2 vols, 1899 and 1901), Royce also links meaning with purpose, seeing the meaning of a term as its intended purpose. Royce was an absolute idealist who held that ultimately reality was a super-self, an absolute mind. Royce argues that for a mind to be able to represent itself and its representations (and not lead to a vicious infinite regress), it must be complex and capacious enough, and only an absolute mind has this capacity.

The American philosopher Brand Blanshard (1892–1987) was also a proponent of idealism who accepted a "necessary isomorphism between knowledge and its object". His idealism is most obvious in The Nature of Thought (1939), where he discusses how all perception is infused with concepts. He then argues from a coherence theory of truth that the "character of reality" must also include coherence itself, and thus, knowledge must be similar to what it knows. Not only that, but knowledge must be part of a single system with the world it knows, and causal relations must be also involve logical relations. These considerations lead to an idealism which sees the world as system of relations that cannot be merely physical.

=== Pluralistic idealism ===
Pluralistic idealism takes the view that there are many individual minds, monads, or processes that together underlie the existence of the observed world and which make possible the existence of the physical universe. Pluralistic idealism does not assume the existence of a single ultimate mind or absolute as with the total monism of absolute idealism; instead it affirms an ultimate plurality of ideas or beings.

==== Personalism ====
Personalism is the view that the individual minds of persons or selves are the basis for ultimate reality and value and as such, emphasizes the fundamentality and inherent worth of persons. Modern personalist idealism emerged during the reaction against what was seen as a dehumanizing impersonalism of absolute idealism, a reaction which was led by figures like Hermann Lotze (1817–1881). Personalists affirmed personal freedom against what they saw as a monism that led to totalitarianism by subordinating the individual to the collective.

Some idealistic personalists defended a theistic personalism (often influenced by Aquinas) in which reality is a society of minds ultimately dependent on a supreme person (God). Defenders of a Theistic and idealistic personalism include Borden Parker Bowne (1847–1910), Andrew Seth Pringle-Pattison (1856–1931), Edgar S. Brightman and George Holmes Howison (1834–1916). These theistic personalists emphasize the dependence of all individual minds on God.

However, other personalists like British idealist J. M. E. McTaggart and Thomas Davidson merely argued for a community of individual minds or spirits, without positing a supreme personal deity who creates or grounds them.<refenberg uncertainty princ p. 202, "Ontologically I am an idealist, since i believe that all that exists is spiritual. I am also, in one sense of the term, a Personal Idealist" (McTaggart).</ref> Similarly, James Ward (1843–1925) was inspired by Leibniz to defend a form of pluralistic idealism in which the universe is composed of "psychic monads" of different levels, interacting for mutual self-betterment.

American personalism was particularly associated with idealism and with Boston university, where Bowne (who had studied with Lotze) developed his personalist idealism and published his Personalism (1908). Bowne's students, like Edgar Sheffield Brightman, Albert C. Knudson (1873–1953), Francis J. McConnell (1871–1953), and Ralph T. Flewelling (1871–1960), continued to develop his personal idealism after his death. The "Boston personalism" tradition also influenced the later work of Peter A. Bertocci (1910–1989), as well as the ideas of Martin Luther King Jr., who studied at Boston University with personalist philosophers and was shaped by their worldview.

George Holmes Howison meanwhile, developed his own brand of "California personalism". Howison argued that both impersonal monistic idealism and materialism run contrary to the experience of moral freedom, while "personal idealism" affirms it. To deny freedom to pursue truth, beauty, and "benign love" is to undermine every profound human venture, including science, morality, and philosophy. Howison, in his book The Limits of Evolution and Other Essays Illustrating the Metaphysical Theory of Personal Idealism, developed a democratic idealism that extended all the way to God, who instead of a monarch, was seen as the ultimate democrat in eternal relation to other eternal persons.

Another pluralistic idealism was Thomas Davidson's (1840–1900) "apeirotheism", which he defined as "a theory of Gods infinite in number". The theory was indebted to Aristotle's view of the eternal rational soul and the nous. Identifying Aristotle's God with rational thought, Davidson argued, contrary to Aristotle, that just as the soul cannot exist apart from the body, God cannot exist apart from the world.

Another influential British idealist, J. M. E. McTaggart (1866–1925), defended a theory in which reality is a community of individual spirits connected by the relation of love. McTaggart defends ontological idealism through a mereological argument which argues only spirits can be substances, as well as through an argument for the unreality of time (a position he also defends in The Unreality of Time).

In The Nature of Existence (1927), McTaggart's argument relies on the premise that substances are infinitely divisible and cannot have simple parts. Furthermore, each of their infinite parts determines every other part. He then analyses various characteristics of reality such as time, matter, sensation, and cogitation and attempts to show they cannot be real elements of real substances, but must be mere appearances. For example, the existence of matter cannot be inferred based on sensations, since they cannot be divided to infinity (and thus cannot be substances). Spirits, on the other hand, are truly infinitely divisible substances. They have "the quality of having content, all of which is the content of one or more selves", and know themselves through direct perception as substances persisting through time. For McTaggart, there is a multiplicity of spirits, which are nevertheless related to each other harmoniously through their love for each other.

McTaggart also criticizes Hegel's view of the state in his Studies in Hegelian Cosmology (1901), arguing that metaphysics can give very little guidance to social and political action, just like it can give us very little guidance in other practical matters, like engineering.

=== Contemporary idealism ===
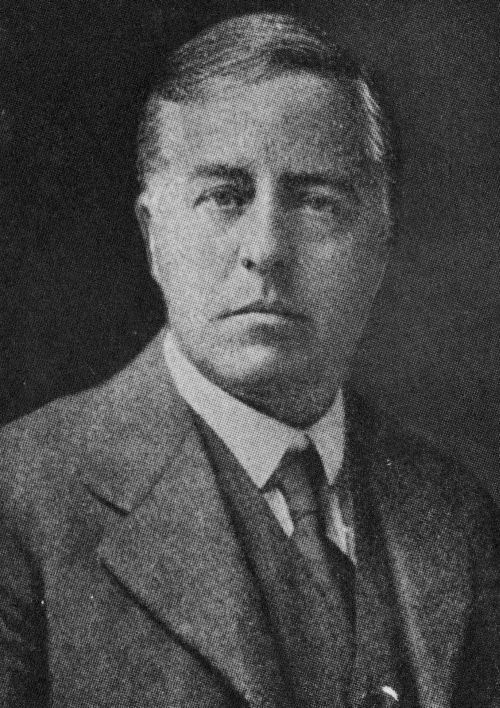
The 20th-century British scientist James Jeans wrote that "the universe begins to look more like a great thought than like a great machine"

Today, idealism remains a minority view in Western analytic circles. In spite of this, the study of the work of the Anglo-American idealists saw a revival in the 21st century with an increase in publications at the turn of the century, and they are now considered to have made important contributions to philosophy.

Several modern figures continue to defend idealism. Recent idealist philosophers include A. A. Luce (Sense without Matter, 1954), Timothy Sprigge (The Vindication of Absolute Idealism, 1984), Leslie Armour, Vittorio Hösle (Objective Idealism, 1998), John Andrew Foster (A World for Us, 2008), John A. Leslie (Infinite Minds: A Philosophical Cosmology, 2002), and Bernardo Kastrup (The Idea of the World, 2018). In 2022, Howard Robinson authored Perception and Idealism.

Both Foster and Sprigge defend idealism through an epistemic argument for the unity of the act of perception with its object. Sprigge also made an argument from grounding, which held that our phenomenal objects presuppose some noumenal ground. As such, for Sprigge, the physical world "consists in innumerable mutually interacting centres of experience, or, what comes to the same, of pulses and flows of experience." Thus, the noumenal ground is the totality of all experiences, which are one "concrete universal", that resembles Bradley's absolute.

Helen Yetter-Chappell has defended nontheistic (quasi-)Berkeleyan idealism.

==== Analytic idealism ====
A recent strand of idealist metaphysics has been developed within analytic philosophy (analytic idealism) by Bernardo Kastrup. In his doctoral dissertation Analytic Idealism (2019), he argues that reality is constituted by universal consciousness and introduces the notion of dissociation as a mechanism to explain how individual conscious agents arise within a single underlying mind. His later work Analytic Idealism in a Nutshell has been the subject of reviews and discussion in contemporary philosophy (e.g. Sjöstedt-Hughes 2025). Building on this approach, Bruno Tonetto's Return to Consciousness (2025) synthesizes consciousness-first arguments from science, metaphysics, and cultural analysis, presenting idealism as a unifying worldview. These contributions exemplify a small but ongoing effort to revive idealist metaphysics in analytic philosophy of mind.

=== Idealistic theories based on 20th-century science ===
Idealist notions took a strong hold among physicists of the early 20th century confronted with the paradoxes of quantum physics and the theory of relativity.

Arthur Eddington, a British astrophysicist of the early 20th century, wrote in his book The Nature of the Physical World that the stuff of the world is mind-stuff, adding that "The mind-stuff of the world is, of course, something more general than our individual conscious minds." Ian Barbour, in his book Issues in Science and Religion, cites Arthur Eddington's The Nature of the Physical World (1928) as a text that argues the Heisenberg uncertainty principle provides a scientific basis for "the defense of the idea of human freedom" and his Science and the Unseen World (1929) for support of philosophical idealism, "the thesis that reality is basically mental."

The physicist Sir James Jeans wrote: "The stream of knowledge is heading towards a non-mechanical reality; the Universe begins to look more like a great thought than like a great machine. Mind no longer appears to be an accidental intruder into the realm of matter... we ought rather hail it as the creator and governor of the realm of matter."

The chemist Ernest Lester Smith, a member of the occult movement Theosophy, wrote a book Intelligence Came First (1975) in which he claimed that consciousness is a fact of nature and that the cosmos is grounded in and pervaded by mind and intelligence.

== Criticism ==
In the Western world, the popularity of idealism as a metaphysical view declined severely in the 20th century, especially in English-language analytic philosophy. This was partly due to the criticisms of British philosophers like G. E. Moore and Bertrand Russell and also due to the critiques of the American "new realists" like E.B. Holt, Ralph Barton Perry and Roy Wood Sellars.

Moore famously critiqued idealism and defended realism in The Refutation of Idealism (1903), and A Defence of Common Sense (1925). In the Refutation, Moore argues that arguments for idealism most often rely on the premise that to be is to be perceived (esse est percipi), but that if this is true "how can we infer that anything whatever, let alone everything, is an inseparable aspect of any experience?". Bertrand Russell's popular 1912 book The Problems of Philosophy also contained a similar critique. Their main objection is that idealists falsely presuppose that the mind's relation to any object is a necessary condition for the existence of the object. Russell thinks this fallacy fails to make "the distinction between act and object in our apprehending of things" (1912 [1974: 42]). Guyer et al. write that the success of these arguments might be controversial and that "the charge that they simply conflate knowledge and object hardly seems to do justice to the elaborate arguments of the late nineteenth-century idealists." It also relies on a realist epistemology in which knowledge stands "in an immediate relation to an independent individual object".

Regarding positive arguments, Moore's most famous argument for the existence of external matter (found in Proof of an External World, 1939) was an epistemological argument from common sense facts, sometimes known as "Here is one hand". Idealism was also more recently critiqued in the works of Australian philosopher David Stove, and by Alan Musgrave, and John Searle.

Physicist Milton A. Rothman has written that idealism is incompatible with science and is not considered an empirical system of knowledge, unlike realism, which is pragmatic and makes testable predictions. Rothman commented that "idealism saying nothing about why ten different observers in different parts of the world measure the speed of light to be the same. If the light beam exists only a construct in my mind, then how does an experimenter in Moscow always get the same result that I do in, say Princeton".

Philosopher and physicist Mario Bunge has written that idealistic thinking is often found in pseudosciences as it postulates immaterial entities that disregard scientific laws.

== See also ==
- Egocentric predicament
- French spiritualism
- Hard problem of consciousness
- Innatism
- Qualia
