= L. Harold DeWolf =

American Methodist minister and theologian (1905–1986)

The Reverend L. Harold DeWolf
- Born: Lotan Harold DeWolf; 31 January 1905; Columbus, Nebraska, US
- Died: 24 March 1986 (aged 81); Lakeland, Florida, US

Ecclesiastical career
- Religion: Christianity (Methodist)
- Church: Methodist Episcopal Church

Academic background
- Education: Nebraska Wesleyan University; Boston University
- Thesis: Premises of the Arguments Concerning Immortality in Thirty Ingersoll Lectures (1896–1934) (1935)
- Doctoral advisor: Edgar S. Brightman
- Influences: Edgar S. Brightman; Friedrich Schleiermacher

Academic work
- Discipline: Theology; philosophy
- Sub-discipline: Systematic theology
- School or tradition: Boston personalism; theological liberalism
- Institutions: Boston University; Wesley Theological Seminary
- Doctoral students: Martin Luther King Jr.

Lotan Harold DeWolf (31 January 1905 – 24 March 1986), usually cited as L. Harold Dewolf, was an American Methodist minister and professor of systematic theology at Boston University where he was Martin Luther King Jr.'s "primary teacher and mentor".

== Early life and education ==
DeWolf was born on 31 January 1905 in Columbus, Nebraska. He obtained a Bachelor of Arts degree from Nebraska Wesleyan University in 1924, then pursued theological studies at Boston University where, in 1926, he obtained a Bachelor of Sacred Theology degree. He received the Borden Parker Bowne Fellowship in Philosophy at Boston University in 1933–1934, and received his Doctor of Philosophy degree in philosophy in 1935 studying under Edgar S. Brightman. His dissertation was titled Premises of the Arguments Concerning Immortality in Thirty Ingersoll Lectures (1896–1934).

== Academic career ==
After graduating, DeWolf served, from 1926 to 1936, as a minister of the Methodist Episcopal Church in Nebraska and Massachusetts. He taught in the philosophy department at Boston University from 1934 to 1944, when he joined the faculty of Boston University School of Theology as professor of systematic theology. He also taught twice in Central and East Africa, in 1955–1956 and 1962–1963. From 1965, until his retirement in 1972, DeWolf was Dean of Wesley Theological Seminary in Washington, DC. In the 1970s he moved to Lakeland, Florida, where he gave periodic lectures at Florida Southern College.

He died on 24 March 1986.

== Martin Luther King Jr. ==
DeWolf became Martin Luther King Jr.'s dissertation adviser at Boston University following the death of Brightman. In his 1955 reader's report, DeWolf concluded that King's work promised to be "an excellent and useful scholarly achievement." In a 1955 letter to his former adviser King wrote: "Both your stimulating lectures and your profound ideas will remain with me so long as the cords of memory shall lengthen. I have discovered that both theologically and philosophically much of my thinking is DeWolfian".

In a 1956 letter to King during the Montgomery bus boycott, DeWolf wrote, "Your letter is a renewing inspiration to me as has been the marvelous leadership which you have given to our people in the south land during these last months." He concluded his letter by saying, "may He bring to you victory for all the people, for which you are making such great sacrifices." King remained friends with DeWolf throughout his life and DeWolf supported King's efforts in the civil rights movement. King invited DeWolf to help with his desegregation campaign in St. Augustine, Florida, and, with three colleagues from Boston University, DeWolf was part of the tense civil rights discussions there. DeWolf spoke at King's funeral on 9 April 1968, calling him "an exemplar of faith, hope, and love." DeWolf later testified before the United States Congress as part of the efforts to have a national holiday honoring King established.

== Published works ==
- The Religious Revolt Against Reason (1949) Harper & Brothers Publishers
- Trends and Frontiers of Religious Thought (1955)
- The Case for Theology in Liberal Perspective (1959) Westminster Press
- The Enduring Messages of the Bible (1960)
- Present Trends in Christian Thought (1960)
- A Theology of the Living Church (rev. ed.; 1960) Harper & Row Publishers [Available at Internet Archive]
- Teaching Our Faith in God (1963)
- A Hard Rain and a Cross (1966)
- Reasonable Freedom: Guidelines to Christian Action (1971)
- Crime and Justice in America: A Paradox of Conscience (1975) Harper & Row
- What Americans Should Do About Crime (1976) Harper & Row
- Eternal Life: Why We Believe (1980) Westminster Press

== See also ==
- Walter George Muelder
