= Theistic finitism =

Belief in a deity that is not omnipotent

Theistic finitism, also known as finitistic theism or finite godism, is the belief in a deity that is limited. It has been proposed by some philosophers and theologians to solve the problem of evil. Most finitists accept the absolute goodness of God but reject omnipotence.

== Definition ==
Finitistic theism denies that God is omnipotent. Ray Harbaugh Dotterer in his book The Argument for a Finitist Theology (1917) summarized the argument for theistic finitism:

God can not be thought to be at once omnipotent and perfectly good. If we say that he is omnipotent, that his sovereignty is complete, that all events that occur are willed by him; then it follows that he is responsible for the actual world, which is partly evil, and, accordingly, that he is not perfectly good. If we begin at the other end, and say God is perfectly good, then we must deny that he is omnipotent.

The idea that God is and must be infinite has been a nearly universal belief amongst monotheists. Only a minority of thinkers have advanced the idea of a finite deity.

== History ==
The idea of a finite God has been traced to Plato's Timaeus. Plato's God was not an omnipotent Creator but a Demiurge struggling to control recalcitrant "stuff" or "matter". To Plato, matter was infected with evil, uncreated by God.

William James (1842–1910) was a believer in a finite God which he used to explain the problem of evil. James rejected the divine authorship of the Bible and the idea of a perfect God. He defined God as a "combination of ideality and (final) efficacity" and preferred a finite God that is "cognizant and responsive in some way". James's finite God was not omnipotent, omnipresent, omniscient or a creator of the universe.

Theologian Clarence Beckwith (1849–1931) suggested that Horace Bushnell (1802–1876) was a finitist. According to Beckwith "one of the earliest attempts in America to show that God was finite was made by Horace Bushnell in his God in Christ (1849).

A minority of historical freethinkers and rationalists advocated a finite God in opposition to the God in Abrahamic religions. H. G. Wells advocated a finite God in his book God the Invisible King (1917). Rannie Belle Baker in his book The Concept of a Limited God (1934) identified Gustav Fechner, Charles Renouvier, William James and John Stuart Mill as admitting the concept of a finite God. F. C. S. Schiller conceived of a finite, evolving God that is limited in power.

Another advocate of theistic finitism was Peter Bertocci (1910–1989) who proposed that "God is all-good but not all-powerful". Most finitists have held that God is personal, although a few such as Henry Nelson Wieman (1884–1975) have stated God is impersonal.

Philosopher Edgar S. Brightman (1884–1953) defended theistic finitism in his book A Philosophy of Religion, published in 1940. Brightman stated that theistic finitism began with Plato and he traced the idea through history to Marcion, Mani and Manichaeism, Pierre Bayle, John Stuart Mill, H. G. Wells and others. Brightman developed the concept of a finite God to solve the problem of evil. He held the view that God is an infinite personal spirit but his power is limited. Brightman suggested that Wells was first "to devote an entire book to the concept of God's finiteness". Wells dissociated his God in any respect from the biblical God. Albert C. Knudson stated that John Stuart Mill was the first modern writer to advocate a finite God.

Philosopher Peter Geach (1916–2013) argued in Omnipotence (1973) that God should not be understood as "omnipotent", but as "almighty", taking the term "omnipotent" to mean "the ability to do anything" and taking the term "almighty" to mean "God's power over all things."

Rufus Burrow Jr. a professor of Christian thought, has argued (2012) that Brightman was different from most other finitists as he held the view that God remains infinite in many ways. This was in opposition to Plato and H. G. Wells. Burrow noted that Brightman characterized God as a "finite-infinite God". Charles Hartshorne who rejected omnipotence also argued for a finite-infinite God.

Other advocates of theistic finitism were Hartley Burr Alexander, John Elof Boodin, Dewitt H. Parker, William Pepperell Montague and W. T. Stace.

== Recent ==
Conservative rabbi Harold Kushner defended theistic finitism in his book When Bad Things Happen to Good People, published in 1981.

Philosopher Frank B. Dilley noted in 2000 that theistic finitism is rarely discussed in modern philosophical literature.

== See also ==
- Process theology
- Theodicy
