= Akhilananda =

Swami Akhilananda

Personal life
- Born: 1894
- Died: 1962 (Aged 68)
- Notable work(s): Hindu Psychology, Hindu View of Christ

Religious life
- Religion: Hinduism
- Philosophy: Vedanta

Religious career
- Teacher: Swami Brahmananda

Swami Akhilananda was born on 25 February 1894 as Nirode Chandra Sanyal in Netrakona in British India (now in Bangladesh).

At the age of 25, Akhilananda joined the Ramakrishna Order, he was initiated by Swami Brahmananda, a direct disciple of Sri Ramakrishna. In November 1926, he went to Boston to assist Swami Paramananda. He established the Vedanta Society of Providence in 1928 and the Ramakrishna Vedanta Society of Boston in 1941.

Akhilanaanda wrote several books, including Hindu Psychology, Its Meaning for the West. This book had a significant impact on the inter-faith dialogue of the US of that time. In his review, Seward Hiltner wrote about the methods described in the book: "These methods, and the conceptions which underlie them, revolve about 'how lower human propensities can be transformed into higher qualities'." Concluding his review, he said, "This is a fascinating book. But we should not be beguiled into overlooking the extent to which its fundamental assumptions clash with our best understanding of the Christian view of life."

Akhilananda also authored the Hindu View of Christ, which fostered greater understanding of the teachings of Jesus from the standpoint of Vedanta. Jan Jongeneel has highlighted these intersections while referring to Akhilananda's Hindu View of Christ alongside works of a number of other swamis of the Ramakrishna Mission. In addition Akhilananda maintained longstanding personal friendships with Edgar S. Brightman and Walter George Muelder, both prominent American philosophers and Christian theologians in the Methodist tradition.

Akhilananda died on 23 September 1962.

== Works ==
- Akhilananda (1946). Hindu Psychology: Its Meaning for the West. Routledge.
- Hindu View of Christ, Branden Books, 1949.ISBN 978-1428603387.
- Modern Problems and Religion, Bruce Humphries, 1964.ISBN 0828311463.
- —— (1972). Spiritual Practices. Boston: Branden Press. SBN 8283-1350-4.
