= Charles Griswold =

Charles Griswold may refer to:

- Charles L. Griswold, American philosopher
- Charles E. Griswold (born 1945), American arachnologist, specializing in the phylogeny of spiders
