= Bogumił Gacka =

Polish Catholic priest and professor (born 1955)

Bogumił Zygmunt Gacka (born 1955) is a Polish Catholic priest, member of the Marian Fathers and the Professor of Christian Personalism at the Cardinal Stefan Wyszyński University in Warsaw, Poland.

== Biography ==
Bogumil Gacka received the Doctorate in Systematic Theology from the John Paul II Catholic University of Lublin, Poland, in 1987. The promoter of his doctoral thesis was Professor Czeslaw S. Bartnik.

He was the vice-rector of the major seminary of the Congregation of Marian Fathers of the Immaculate Conception of the Most Blessed Virgin Mary (Marian Fathers). His Christian formation of faith is related to the Neocatechumenal Way, he has been walking since 1976.

== Publications ==
- Bibliography of American Personalism, Lublin 1994.
- American Personalism, Lublin 1995.
- Personalism Biannual Journal (editor) - 2001–2006, ISSN 1643-0468.
