= Juan Manuel Burgos =

Spanish philosopher (born 1961)

Juan Manuel Burgos Velasco (born 1961, Valladolid) is a Spanish Personalist philosopher. He holds a PhD in physics, (Barcelona, 1988) and a PhD in philosophy (Rome, 1992). He is professor at the University San Pablo CEU, Madrid and at the John Paul II Institute, Madrid, a member of the Jacques Maritain International Institute, and distinguished guest professor at Galileo University (2007, Guatemala). In 2007, he became an honorary professor at the Institute of Family Sciences (Guatemala) for his contribution to family sciences through his anthropology studies.

He is founder and president of Spain's Asociación Española de Personalismo, an institution dedicated to develop and promote personalism through publications and seminaries. The editor of Palabra Editorials, Madrid, Burgos has published books and articles on specialized magazines on diverse topics on Personalism, philosophical anthropology, bioethics, and sociology of the family.

== Published works ==
- La inteligencia ética. La propuesta de Jacques Maritain, 1995, ISBN 3-906754-26-X.
- El personalismo. Autores y temas de una filosofía nueva, 2000, (2ª ed. 2003) ISBN 84-8239-440-1.
- Antropología: una guía para la existencia, 2003 (2ª ed. 2005), ISBN 84-8239-745-1.
- Diagnóstico sobre la familia, 2004, ISBN 84-8239-848-2.
- Para comprender a Jacques Maritain. Un ensayo histórico-crítico, 2006, ISBN 84-95334-96-8.
- Hacia una definición de la filosofía personalista, (editor, en colaboración con José Luis Cañas y Urbano Ferrer), 2006, ISBN 84-8239-998-5.
- La filosofía personalista de Karol Wojtyła, (editor), 2007, ISBN 978-84-9840-098-4.
- Repensar la naturaleza humana, 2007, ISBN 978-84-8469-206-5.
- El vuelo del alción, (editor en colaboración con José Luis Cañas), 2009, ISBN 978-84-8393-026-7.

=== General references ===
- The personalist method, J.M. Burgos, Una cuestión de método: el uso de la analogía en el personalismo y en el tomismo, 2007, Dialogo filosófico No. 68; ISSN 0213-1196, pp. 251-268
- AN ADEQUATE CONCEPT OF "HUMAN NATURE" IS KEY AGAINST RELATIVISTIC DRIFT, Zenit.org. Accessed 12 November 2022.
- Profile: Juan Manuel Burgos, personalismo.org. Accessed 12 November 2022.
