= Walter George Muelder =

American academic (1907–2004)

The Reverend Walter George Muelder
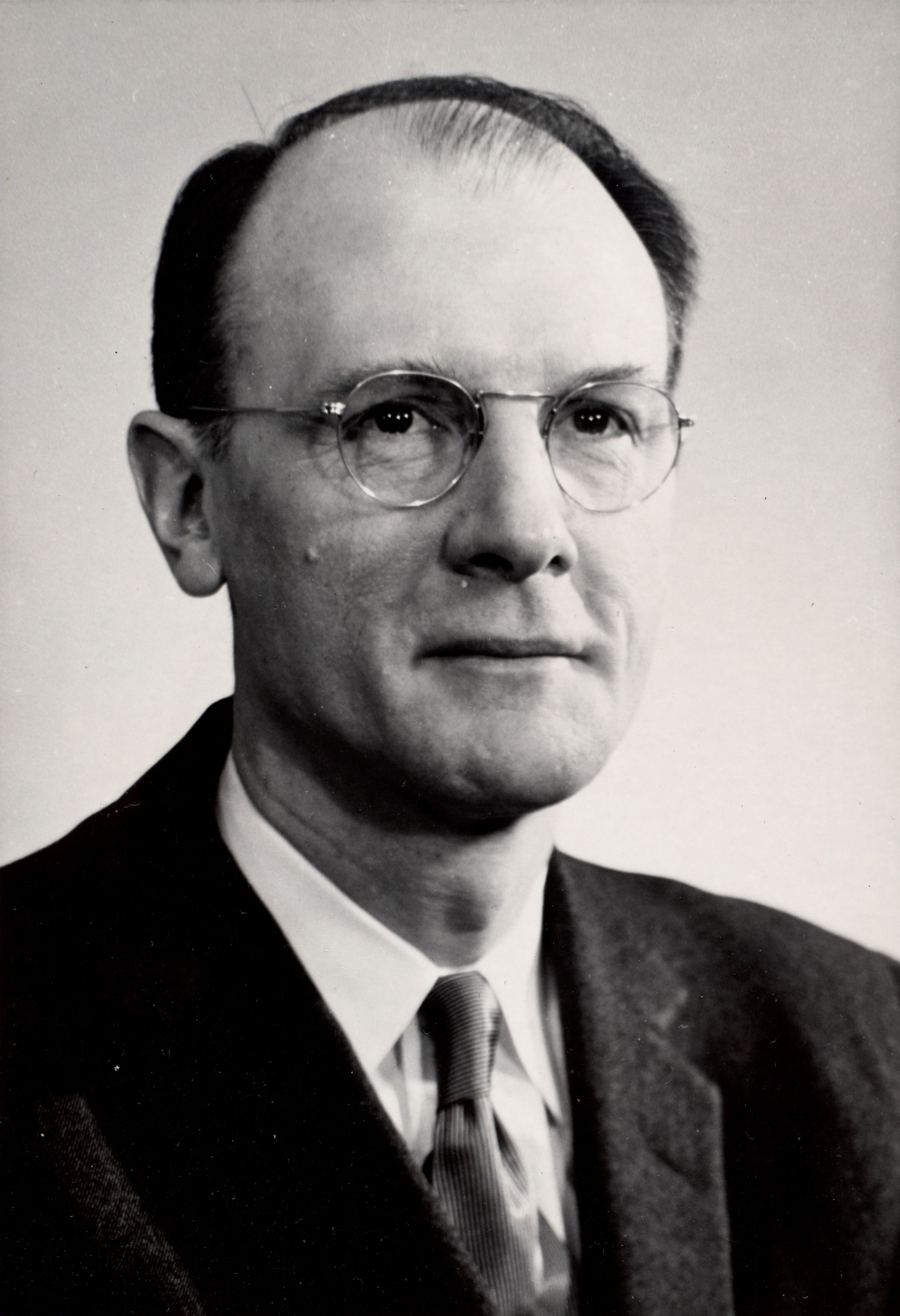
- Muelder c. 1972
- Born: March 1, 1907; Boody, Illinois, U.S.
- Died: June 12, 2004 (aged 97); Boston, Massachusetts, U.S.

Ecclesiastical career
- Religion: Christianity (Methodist)

Academic background
- Education: Knox College; Boston University
- Thesis: Individual Totalities in Ernst Troeltsch's Philosophy of History (1933)
- Doctoral advisor: Edgar S. Brightman
- Influences: Borden Parker Bowne; Edgar S. Brightman; Harry Emerson Fosdick; Mahatma Gandhi; Max Horkheimer; William James; Albert C. Knudson; Karl Mannheim; Rudolf Otto; Kirby Page; James Bissett Pratt; Walter Rauschenbusch; Paul Tillich; Ernst Troeltsch

Academic work
- Discipline: Philosophy; theology
- Sub-discipline: Ethics
- School or tradition: Boston personalism; Christian socialism; Social Gospel
- Institutions: Berea College; University of Southern California; Boston University
- Influenced: Stanley Hallett; Martin Luther King Jr.

Walter George Muelder (March 1, 1907 – June 12, 2004) was an American social ethicist, public theologian, ecumenist, and Methodist minister. He studied under Edgar S. Brightman at Boston University and began his teaching career at Berea College and the University of Southern California. He served as Dean of Boston University School of Theology from 1945 to 1972, and was known as the "Red Dean" because of his socialist and pacifist leanings.

== Biography ==
Muelder was born on March 1, 1907, in Boody, Illinois, to the Methodist minister Epke Muelder and Minne Muelder. Epke Mueller was a social gospeller who had studied at Boston University under Borden Parker Bowne and Albert C. Knudson. Walter Muelder completed his undergraduate education at Knox College in Galesburg, Illinois, in 1927 before earning a Bachelor of Sacred Theology degree and a Doctorate of Philosophy in philosophy at the Boston University School of Theology in 1930 and 1933 respectively. His doctoral dissertation, written under the supervision of Edgar S. Brightman, was titled Individual Totalities in Ernst Troeltsch's Philosophy of History.

As a theologian he helped develop the Boston school of personalism into a Christian social ethic at a time when social ethics was still a relatively new term. As an ecumenist he was involved in forming early social statements of the World Council of Churches. During his tenure at Boston University, he was responsible for the training of more African-American PhD students than any single university in the country. He was credited by Martin Luther King Jr., a student of his at Boston (as well as Coretta Scott King in later years), as being an important influence in King's pilgrimage to nonviolence as a philosophy of social change. Among his major works are Foundations of the Responsible Society (1959) and Moral Law and Christian Ethics (1966). He was elected a Fellow of the American Academy of Arts and Sciences in 1965.

Muelder died on June 12, 2004, in Boston, Massachusetts.
