= Charles L. Griswold =

American philosopher

Charles Griswold
- Awards: American Council of Learned Societies Fellowship (2009/10), Stanford Humanities Center Fellowship (2004/05)

Education
- Education: Pennsylvania State University (PhD)

Philosophical work
- Era: 21st-century philosophy
- Region: Western philosophy
- Institutions: Boston University
- Main interests: Ancient Philosophy, Moral and Political Philosophy, Eighteenth-Century Philosophy, Philosophy and Literature, Metaphilosophy

Charles Griswold, also known as Charles L. Griswold Jr., is an American philosopher and Professor of Philosophy Emeritus at Boston University. His research addresses various themes, figures, and historical periods. He is particularly known for his work on Plato, Adam Smith, and forgiveness. Griswold joined the Boston University faculty in 1991, and was named Borden Parker Bowne Professor of Philosophy in 2010.

== Books ==
- Jean-Jacques Rousseau and Adam Smith: a Philosophical Encounter. Routledge, 2018
- Forgiveness: a Philosophical Exploration. Cambridge University Press, 2007
- Adam Smith and the Virtues of Enlightenment. Cambridge University Press, 1999
- Self-knowledge in Plato’s Phaedrus. Yale University Press, 1986, paperback 1988
- Ancient Forgiveness: Classical, Judaic, and Christian (co-edited with David Konstan). Cambridge University Press, 2012.
- Platonic Writings, Platonic Readings (ed.). Routledge, Chapman and Hall, 1988
