= Peter Anthony Bertocci =

American philosopher (1910-1989)

Peter Bertocci
- Born: May 13, 1910
- Died: October 13, 1989 (aged 79)

Philosophical work
- Era: 21st-century philosophy
- Region: Western philosophy

Peter Bertocci (1910–1989) was an American philosopher and Borden Parker Bowne professor of philosophy, emeritus, at Boston University. He was a president of the Metaphysical Society of America.

Bertocci was an advocate of theistic finitism, proposing that "God is all-good but not all-powerful".

== Selected publications ==
- The Empirical Argument for God in Late British Thought (1935)
- Introduction to the Philosophy of Religion (1951)
- Can the Goodness of God Be Empirically Grounded? (1957)
- Sex, Love, and the Person (1967)
- The Person God Is (1970)
- Is God for Real (1971)
- The Goodness of God (1981)
