= George Holmes Howison =

American philosopher (1834–1916)

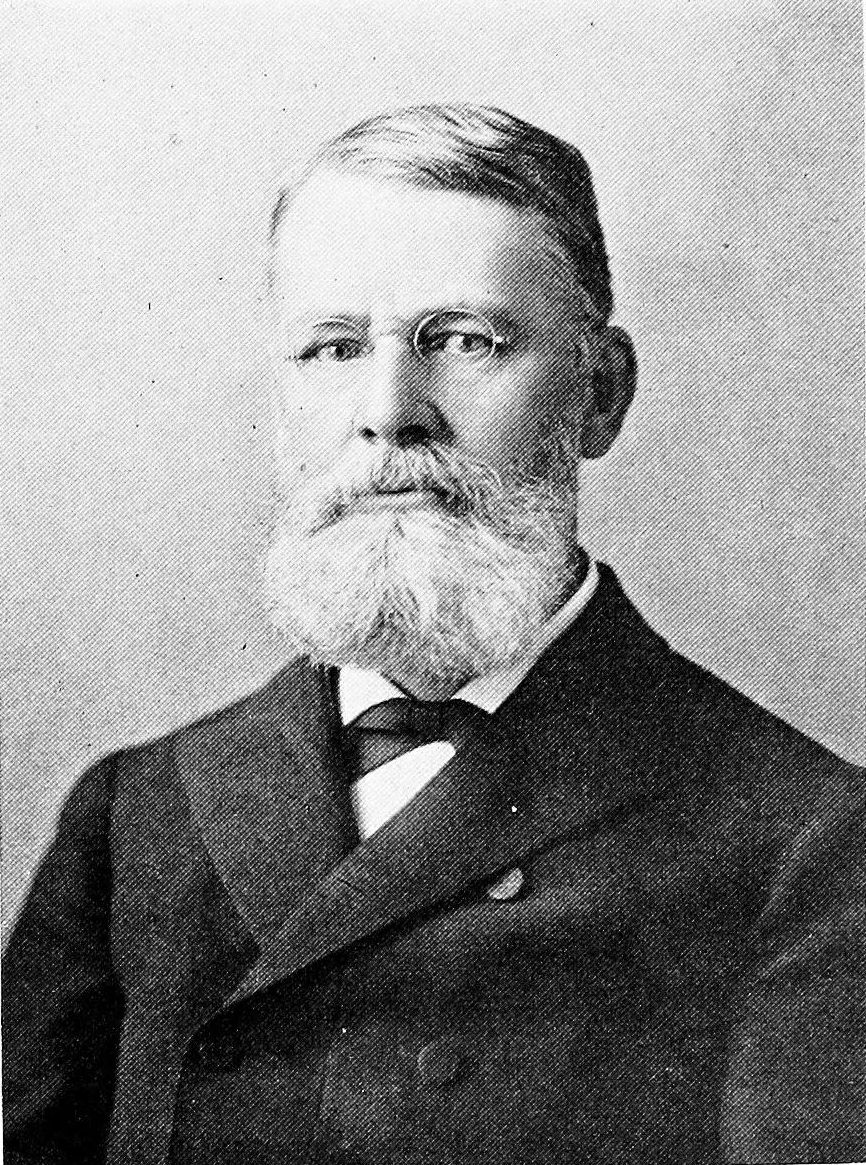
- Born: 29 November 1834; Montgomery County, Maryland, U.S.
- Died: 31 December 1916 (aged 82); Berkeley, California, U.S.

Education
- Education: Marietta College

Philosophical work
- Era: Western philosophy
- Region: 20th-century philosophy
- School: California personalism
- Institutions: University of California, Berkeley
- Main interests: Theology
- Notable ideas: Personal idealism

George Holmes Howison (29 November 1834 – 31 December 1916) was an American philosopher who established the philosophy department at the University of California, Berkeley and held the position there of Mills Professor of Intellectual and Moral Philosophy and Civil Polity. He also founded the Philosophical Union, one of the oldest philosophical organizations in the United States.

Howison's philosophy is set forth almost entirely in his volume entitled The Limits of Evolution, and other essays, illustrating the metaphysical theory of personal idealism (1901, 2nd ed.: 1905). Friends and former students of Howison established the Howison Lectures in Philosophy in 1919. Over the years, the lecture series has included talks by distinguished philosophers such as Michel Foucault and Noam Chomsky.

== Life ==
George Holmes Howison was born on November 29, 1834, in Montgomery County, Maryland, and died in Berkeley, California on December 31, 1916. His parents were Robert Howison of Virginia and Eliza Holmes Howison of Maryland. These were old and distinguished Southern families, Presbyterians and slaveholders. Howison's biography is eclectic and the basis of Howison's later devotion to pluralism. Howison was the primary originator of philosophical pluralism in America, which was his most enduring contribution to philosophy. Although he was widely recognized during his lifetime, Howison's ideas have spread and come into the present mainly through influence on other notable philosophers whose names have continued to attract attention, especially Josiah Royce, William James, and Borden Parker Bowne. Howison was, by the accounts of those who knew him, a very persuasive philosopher.

When Howison was four years of age his parents freed their slaves and moved to Marietta, Ohio, for the improved educational and cultural life it offered at that time. The various Christian sects there had worked out a consensus and ecumenism, creating a co-operative community in which even Protestants and Catholics worked together. This religious pluralism was exceedingly rare in 19th century North America. Howison attended Marietta Academy and later Harmar Academy where he received a classical education, including ancient languages. He entered Marietta College at 14 and studied German. He studied philosophy in his senior year. After graduating, Howison pursued Christian ministry, graduating from Lane Seminary in Cincinnati and being licensed to preach. Howison did not take a church, however, and served as a schoolteacher and principal several Ohio towns. In 1862 he moved to Salem, Massachusetts as a school principal. There he met and married Lois Caswell, an English teacher, who was related to several prominent academic families associated with Yale University and Brown University. Howison continued to educate himself, especially in mathematics.

Having moved to better and better schools and having made a name for himself as an educator, in 1864 (when he was 30) Howison was offered a post as professor at Washington University in St. Louis. During the following years Howison taught in all the branches of mathematics, including applied fields such as mechanics and astronomy, but also in political economy and Latin. Howison wrote a treatise on analytic geometry (1869) and an algebra primer (1870). In St. Louis Howison also came into contact with a subdivision of the St. Louis Philosophical Society called The Kant Club, which met at the home of William Torrey Harris. With this group he read G. W. F. Hegel's The Phenomenology of Spirit. His association with Harris and the St. Louis Hegelians turned Howison's main interest to philosophy. Harris' The Journal of Speculative Philosophy was started during this time and Howison published an important paper on the relations among the branches of mathematics in one of its early numbers. The Kant Club hosted speeches by both Ralph Waldo Emerson and Bronson Alcott. Washington University offered no opportunity for Howison to pursue philosophy, so he returned to New England to become headmaster at English High School in Boston. In 1872 Howison moved to the new Massachusetts Institute of Technology as its Professor of Logic and Philosophy of Science, remaining until 1878, when financial problems forced M.I.T. to eliminate his position. It was during these years that Howison began writing philosophy. He held various teaching positions and lectured for money between 1878 and 1882, including courses at Harvard Divinity School and the Concord School of Philosophy, where he became better acquainted with Emerson and Alcott.

Also during these years he attended every two weeks the informal philosophical meetings in the Temple Street rooms of Thomas Davidson with a small group that included William James and Bowne. American philosophical pluralism and American personalism began here. These views were differently articulated and defended by James, Bowne, Davidson, and Howison, but their commonalities are many.

Beginning in 1880 Howison traveled and studied in Europe. In 1881 he enrolled at the University of Berlin, studying Kant with Jules Michelet which moderated Howison's enthusiasm for Hegel and planted a predilection for Kantian thinking in Howison's mind which remained for the rest of his life.

Howison returned to the US in 1882, and hoped to teach at Harvard while James was on sabbatical, but Royce, being younger and very promising, was given preference. Howison taught privately for a year and although he did not want to leave Boston, he accepted a position at the University of Michigan, which turned out to be not to his liking. At this time, the University of California decided to begin a philosophy program and recruited Howison, now 50 and a prominent voice in academia, as the Mills Professor of Mental and Moral Philosophy and Civil Polity, and they invited Howison to create a philosophy program according to his own vision. Howison's extensive administrative experience along with his connections to the eastern and mid-western intellectual lights led to great success. Howison was also an inspiring teacher and so the program attracted students easily. Howison's Philosophical Union became a prominent host for public lectures and even debates, hosting such speakers as James, Royce, and John Dewey.

Howison became a popular and controversial speaker and became the progenitor of the California school of American personalism. His heterodox teachings about the nature of God placed him at odds with the theological community, but his incisive ability to defend it against all challenges and his personal charity and moral excellence kept him safe from serious personal attacks. Despite Howison's dissatisfaction with other contemporary and historical metaphysicians, he did continue to profess Christianity. He recognized that his support of Jesus' position was not accepted as he might have hoped by his Christian peers, but maintained that his theory of personal idealism was in line with Jesus' teaching, particularly as presented by "the 4th gospeler", John. He said: "I feel the strongest assurance that my new interpretation of the name of God is the genuine fulfilment of the highest and profoundest prescience in the historic religious life."

While he was well known and widely respected in the young professional discipline of philosophy, Howison did not publish prolifically. Most of those who have written on Howsion attribute his reluctance to publish to his perfectionism regarding language and writing. He was exacting, as is indicated by his revision of a widely used dictionary of English synonyms (1892).

== Royce's The Conception of God ==
In 1897 Josiah Royce gave a talk which, along with the arguments of Sidney Edward Mezes, Joseph LeConte, and Howison (presaging his later definitive opus), and the follow-up replies by Royce Himself, was published in the book entitled "The Conception of God: A philosophical discussion concerning the nature of the divine idea as a demonstrable reality" (edited by Howison). Howison's section, entitled "The City of God, and the True God as its Head", spans pages 79–132.

Howison characterized Royce's God:

Strictly construed, it is, as I have just endeavoured to show, simply the vindication of that active sovereign judgment which is the light of every mind, which organises even the most elementary perceptions, and which goes on in its ceaseless critical work of reorganisation after reorganisation, building all the successive stages of science, and finally mastering those ultimate implications of science that constitute the insights of philosophy. In other words, the conception is a philosophical and real account of the nature of an isolated human being, or created spirit, the numerical unit in the created universe, viewed as such a spirit appears in what has well been called its natural aspect; viewed, that is, as the organising subject of a natural-scientific experience, marked by fragmentariness that is forever being tentatively overcome and enwholed, — if I may coin a word to match the excellent German one ergänzt.

== See also ==
- American philosophy
- List of American philosophers
- "all knowledge is personal", Michael Polanyi
- Wikiquote
