= Personalism =

Philosophical and theological school of thought

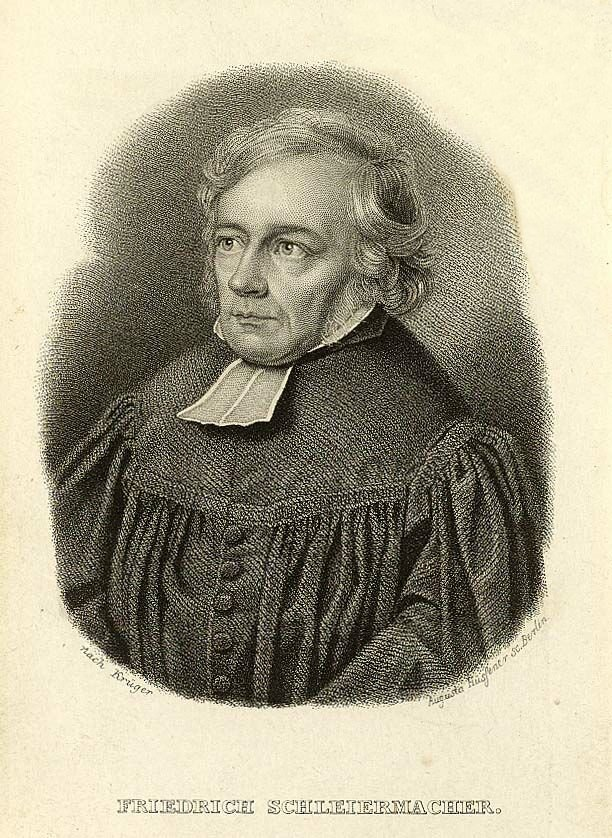
Friedrich Schleiermacher

Max Scheler

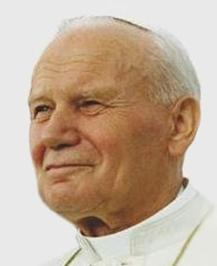
John Paul II

Personalism is an intellectual stance that emphasizes the importance of the human person. Personalism exists in many different versions, and this makes it somewhat difficult to define as a philosophical and theological movement. Friedrich Schleiermacher first used the term personalism (German: Personalismus) in print in 1799. One can trace the concept back to earlier thinkers in various parts of the world.

== Overview ==
Writing in the Stanford Encyclopedia of Philosophy, Thomas D. Williams and Jan Olof Bengtsson cite a plurality of "schools" holding to a "personalist" ethic and "Weltanschauung", arguing:

Personalism exists in many different versions, and this makes it somewhat difficult to define as a philosophical and theological movement. Many philosophical schools have at their core one particular thinker or even one central work which serves as a canonical touchstone. Personalism is a more diffused and eclectic movement and has no such common reference point. It is, in point of fact, more proper to speak of many personalisms than one personalism. In 1947 Jacques Maritain could write that there are at least "a dozen personalist doctrines, which at times have nothing more in common than the word 'person.'" Moreover, because of their emphasis on the subjectivity of the person, some of the more important exponents of personalism have not undertaken systematic treatises of their theories.

It is perhaps more proper to speak of personalism as a "current" or a broader "worldview", since it represents more than one school or one doctrine while at the same time the most important forms of personalism do display some central and essential commonalities. Most important of the latter is the general affirmation of the centrality of the person for philosophical thought. Personalism posits ultimate reality and value in personhood – human as well as (at least for most personalists) divine. It emphasizes the significance, uniqueness and inviolability of the person, as well as the person's essentially relational or social dimension. The title "personalism" can therefore legitimately be applied to any school of thought that focuses on the centrality of persons and their unique status among beings in general, and personalists normally acknowledge the indirect contributions of a wide range of thinkers throughout the history of philosophy who did not regard themselves as personalists. Personalists believe that the person should be the ontological and epistemological starting point of philosophical reflection. Many are concerned to investigate the experience, the status, and the dignity of the human being as person, and regard this as the starting-point for all subsequent philosophical analysis.

— Thomas D. Williams

Thus, according to Williams, one ought to keep in mind that although there are many theorists and activists in the West adhering to the rubric of "personalism," their particular foci may not align with each other and, in fact, might even diverge considerably.

== Variants ==
=== Nikolai Alexandrovich Berdyaev ===
Nikolai Alexandrovich Berdyaev (1874–1948) was a Russian religious and political philosopher who emphasized human freedom, subjectivity and creativity.

=== Emmanuel Mounier ===
In France, philosopher Emmanuel Mounier (1905–1950) was the leading proponent of personalism, around which he founded the review Esprit, which exists to this day. Under Jean-Marie Domenach's direction, it criticized the use of torture during the Algerian War. Personalism was seen as an alternative to both liberalism and Marxism, which respected human rights and the human personality without indulging in excessive collectivism. Mounier's personalism had an important influence in France, including in political movements, such as Marc Sangnier's Ligue de la jeune République (Young Republic League) founded in 1912.

=== Catholic personalism ===
Following on the writings of Dorothy Day, a distinctively Christian personalism developed in the 20th century. Its main theorist was the Polish philosopher Karol Wojtyła (later Pope John Paul II). In his work, Love and Responsibility, first published in 1960, Wojtyła proposed what he termed 'the personalistic norm':

This norm, in its negative aspect, states that the person is the kind of good which does not admit of use and cannot be treated as an object of use and as such the means to an end. In its positive form the personalistic norm confirms this: the person is a good towards which the only proper and adequate attitude is love

This brand of personalism has come to be known as "Thomistic" because of its efforts to square modern notions regarding the person with the teachings of Thomas Aquinas. Wojtyła was influenced by the ethical personalism of German phenomenologist Max Scheler.

A first principle of Christian personalism is that persons are not to be used, but to be respected and loved. In Gaudium et spes, the Second Vatican Council formulated what has come to be considered the key expression of this personalism: "man is the only creature on earth that God willed for its own sake and he cannot fully find himself except through a sincere gift of himself".

This formula for self-fulfillment offers a key for overcoming the dichotomy frequently felt between personal "realization" and the needs or demands of social life. Personalism also implies inter-personalism, as Benedict XVI stresses in Caritas in veritate:

As a spiritual being, the human creature is defined through interpersonal relations. The more authentically he or she lives these relations, the more his or her own personal identity matures. It is not by isolation that man establishes his worth, but by placing himself in relation with others and with God.

Renowned laity contribute significantly to the modern Catholic disposition on personalism as well. For example, Dietrich von Hildebrand noted:

[Moral values] can only grow out of conscious, free attitudes; man himself must essentially cooperate for their realization. They can only develop through his conscious, free abandonment of himself to genuine values. In proportion to man’s capacity to grasp values, in so far as he sees the fullness of the world of values with a clear and fresh vision, in so far as his abandonment to this world is pure and unconditional, will he be rich in moral values.

=== Boston personalism ===
Personalism flourished in the early 20th century at Boston University in a movement known as Boston personalism led by theologian Borden Parker Bowne. Bowne emphasized the person as the fundamental category for explaining reality and asserted that only persons are real. He stood in opposition to certain forms of materialism which would describe persons as mere particles of matter. For example, against the argument that persons are insignificant specks of dust in the vast universe, Bowne would say that it is impossible for the entire universe to exist apart from a person to experience it. Ontologically speaking, the person is "larger" than the universe because the universe is but one small aspect of the person who experiences it. Personalism affirms the existence of the soul. Most personalists assert that God is real and that God is a person (or as in Christian trinitarianism, three 'persons', although the nonstandard meaning of the word 'person' in this theological context is significantly different from Bowne's usage).

Bowne also held that persons have value (see axiology, value theory, and ethics). In declaring the absolute value of personhood, he stood firmly against certain forms of philosophical naturalism (including social Darwinism) which sought to reduce the value of persons. He also stood against certain forms of positivism which sought to render ethical and theological discourse meaningless and dismiss talk of God a priori.

Georgia Harkness was a major Boston personalist theologian. Francis John McConnell was a major second-generation advocate of Boston personalism who sought to apply the philosophy to social problems of his time.

=== California personalism ===
George Holmes Howison taught a metaphysical theory called personal idealism or California personalism. Howison maintained that both impersonal, monistic idealism and materialism run contrary to the moral freedom experienced by persons. To deny the freedom to pursue the ideals of truth, beauty, and "benignant love" is to undermine every profound human venture, including science, morality, and philosophy. Thus, even the personalistic idealism of Borden Parker Bowne and Edgar S. Brightman and the realistic personal theism of Thomas Aquinas are inadequate, for they make finite persons dependent for their existence upon an infinite Person and support this view by an unintelligible doctrine of creatio ex nihilo.

The Personal Idealism of Howison was explained in his book The Limits of Evolution and Other Essays Illustrating the Metaphysical Theory of Personal Idealism. Howison created a radically democratic notion of personal idealism that extended all the way to God, who was no more the ultimate monarch, no longer the only ruler and creator of the universe, but the ultimate democrat in eternal relation to other eternal persons. Howison found few disciples among the religious, for whom his thought was heretical; the non-religious, on the other hand, considered his proposals too religious; only J. M. E. McTaggart's idealist atheism or Thomas Davidson's apeirotheism seem to resemble Howison's personal idealism.

=== Critical personalism ===
Critical personalism is a German development. Based on humanistic considerations (e.g. Spaemann), African Theories on Personhood (e.g. Wiredu) receptions of communitarian theories (e.g. Taylor) and empirical findings of developmental, social and personality psychology it addresses the issue of the development of personhood in community. Each person does not only reach a certain position within community but also forms an individual personality over his or her life span. In doing so, they determine a relationship to their selves and to other people. The development of personality appears as a way to take responsibility in community. Communities are thought of as by nature infinitely diverse associations, which are not characterised by fixed values, but rather by the fact that they constantly communicate about values as they constantly arise due to actual praxis. On the basis of discourse ethics (Habermas, Apel) and the methodology of critical mediation, critical personalism in given social contexts reflects on communication practices and the societal conditions for personality development.

=== Tartu school of personalism ===
German philosopher Gustav Teichmüller (1832–1888) founded the personalism school when he came to Tartu in 1871. The core of the group consisted of the first Latvian philosopher Jēkabs Osis (1860–1920), the Russian philosopher Yevgeni Bobrov (1867–1933), the Lithuanian Włodzimierz Szyłkarski (1884–1960), and the Polish thinker Wincenty Lutosławski (1863–1954). This group of philosophers came together to revise German idealism and fight materialistic tendencies. Teichmüller criticised Hegel and Kant's followers. He believed in a new doctrine that would reveal and justify the importance of an individual personality as the only true source of existence. Teichmüller significantly influenced Russian and Latvian philosophical thought.

== Antecedents and influence ==
Philosopher Immanuel Kant, though not formally considered a personalist, made an important contribution to the personalist cause by declaring that a person is not to be valued merely as a means to the ends of other people, but that he possesses dignity (an absolute inner worth) and is to be valued as an end in himself.

Catholic philosopher and theologian John Henry Newman, has been posited as a main proponent of personalism by John Crosby of Franciscan University in his book Personalist Papers. Crosby notes Newman's personal approach to faith, as outlined in Grammar of Assent as a main source of Newman's personalism.

Martin Luther King Jr. was greatly influenced by personalism in his studies at Boston University. King came to agree with the position that only personality is real. It solidified his understanding of God as a personal god. It also gave him a metaphysical basis for his belief that all human personality has dignity and worth. In fact, Rufus Burrow highlights King:

"I think I have discovered the highest good," he said. "It is love. This principle stands at the center of the cosmos. As John says, 'God is love.' He who loves is participating in the being of God. He who hates does not know God."

Paul Ricœur explicitly sought to support personalist movement by developing its theoretical foundation and expanding it with a new personalist social ethic. However, he later had significant disagreements with Mounier and criticized other personalist writers for insufficient conceptual clarity. Ricœur also disagreed with the other personalists in asserting the significance of justice as a value in its own right and gave this primary in the public sphere, whereas Mounier characterized all relationships including public and political ones in terms of love and friendship.

Pope John Paul II was also influenced by the personalism advocated by Christian existentialist philosopher Søren Kierkegaard. Before his election to the Roman papacy, he wrote The Acting Person (sometimes mistranslated as Person and Act), a philosophical work suffused with personalism. Though he remained well within the traditional stream of Catholic social and individual morality, his explanation of the origins of moral norms, as expressed in his encyclicals on economics and on sexual morality, for instance, was largely drawn from a personalist perspective. His writings as Roman pontiff, of course, influenced a generation of Catholic theologians who have since taken up personalist perspectives on the theology of the family and social order.

== Notable personalists ==
Start your work from where you live, with the small concrete needs right around you. Help ease tension in your workplace. Help feed the person right in front of you. Personalism holds that we each have a deep personal obligation to live simply, to look after the needs of our brothers and sisters, and to share in the happiness and misery they are suffering.

— David Brooks, The Road to Character. 2015.
- Randall Auxier
- Willem Banning
- Borden Parker Bowne
- Edgar S. Brightman
- Martin Buber
- Bernard Charbonneau
- Dorothy Day
- Jacques Ellul
- Ralph Tyler Flewelling
- George Holmes Howison
- Bogumil Gacka
- Albert C. Knudson
- Edvard Kocbek
- Milan Komar
- Feliks Koneczny
- Edwin Lewis
- Nikolay Lossky
- John Macmurray
- Gabriel Marcel
- Peter Maurin
- J. M. E. McTaggart
- Walter George Muelder
- A. J. Muste
- Ngô Đình Diệm
- Ngô Đình Nhu
- Madame Ngô Đình Nhu
- Michael O'Brien
- Constantin Rădulescu-Motru
- Charles Renouvier
- Herman Van Rompuy (Note: Herman Van Rompuy, former Prime Minister of Belgium and President of the European Council, frequently referred to personalism and wrote extensively about Catholic personalist philosophy.)
- Denis de Rougemont
- Francisco de Sá Carneiro
- Robert Spaemann
- F. C. S. Schiller
- William Stern
- Gustav Teichmüller
- Pierre Trudeau
- Max Stirner
- Dietrich von Hildebrand
- Pope John Paul II

== See also ==
- Juan Manuel Burgos
- Christian and atheistic existentialism
- Communitarianism
- Existential Thomism
- Individualism
- Charles Liebman on Jewish personalism
- The Personalist, a journal dedicated to personalism from about 1920 to 1979, now the Pacific Philosophical Quarterly
- Personalist Labor Revolutionary Party (Can Lao Party), a South Vietnamese party founded and led by Ngô Đình Nhu for use as an instrument of control for the presidency of his brother Ngô Đình Diệm
- Francisco Rolão Preto
- Speculative theism
