= Borden Parker Bowne =

American philosopher and Methodist clergyman (1847–1910)

The Reverend Borden Parker Bowne
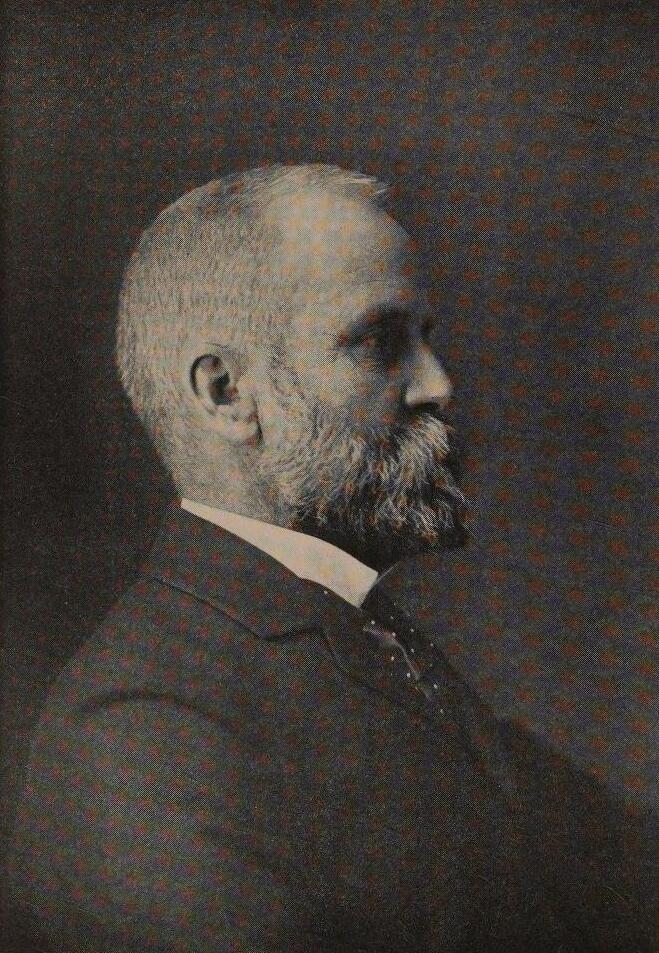
- Portrait of Bowne in a 1929 publication
- Born: January 14, 1847; Monmouth County, New Jersey, U.S.
- Died: April 1, 1910 (aged 63); Boston, Massachusetts, U.S.
- Spouse: Kate Morrison

Ecclesiastical career
- Religion: Christianity (Methodist)
- Church: Methodist Episcopal Church
- Ordained: 1882 (elder)

Academic background
- Education: New York University
- Influences: George Berkeley; René Descartes; Immanuel Kant; Gottfried Wilhelm Leibniz; Hermann Lotze

Academic work
- Discipline: Philosophy
- Sub-discipline: Metaphysics; philosophy of religion
- School or tradition: Boston personalism
- Institutions: Boston University
- Doctoral students: Edgar S. Brightman; Ralph Tyler Flewelling; Albert C. Knudson; Francis John McConnell
- Notable students: George Albert Coe
- Notable works: Metaphysics (1882)
- Influenced: Randall Auxier; John W. E. Bowen Sr.; T. C. Chao; Walter George Muelder

Borden Parker Bowne (Note: Pronounced /ˈboʊn/.) (January 14, 1847 – April 1, 1910) was an American Christian philosopher, Methodist minister and theologian. He was nominated for the Nobel Prize in Literature nine times.

== Life ==
Bowne was born on January 14, 1847, near Leonardville in Monmouth County, New Jersey. In 1876 he became a professor of philosophy at Boston University, where he taught for more than thirty years. He later served as the first dean of the graduate school. Bowne was an acute critic of mechanistic determinism, positivism, and naturalism. He categorized his views as Kantianized Berkeleyanism, transcendental empiricism, and, finally, personalism, emphasizing freedom and the importance of the self, a philosophical branch of liberal theology: of this branch Bowne is the dominant figure; this personalism is sometimes called Boston personalism, in contrast with the California personalism of George Holmes Howison. Bowne's magnum opus, Metaphysics, was published in 1882. Bowne was chiefly influenced by Hermann Lotze. He died on April 1, 1910, in Boston, Massachusetts.

== Legacy ==
Bowne has influenced philosophy in various ways. For instance, there has been a direct line of personalists from Bowne through his student, Edgar Sheffield Brightman (1884–1954), through Brightman's student, Peter Anthony Bertocci (1910–1989), to Bertocci's student, Thomas O. Buford (born 1932).

There has also been a more general influence, as with Martin Luther King Jr., who studied at Boston University, and spoke in his Stride Toward Freedom of having gained "a metaphysical basis for the dignity and worth of all human personality."

Bowne received nine nominations for the Nobel Prize in Literature between 1906 and 1909—one from his own sister.

Boston University named a professorship in Bowne's honor. The named professors are:

- Edgar S. Brightman (1925 - 1953)
- Peter Anthony Bertocci
- Stanley Rosen
- Charles L. Griswold
- Juliet Floyd (2023-)

== Published works ==
- The Philosophy of Herbert Spencer (New York, 1874).
- Studies in Theism (New York, 1882).
- Metaphysics: A Study in First Principles (New York, 1882; revised ed., 1898).
- Introduction to Psychological Theory (New York, 1886).
- Philosophy of Theism (New York, 1887; revised ed. 1902).
- The Principles of Ethics (New York, 1892).
- Theory of Thought and Knowledge (New York, 1899).
- The Christian Revelation (Cincinnati, 1898).
- The Christian Life (Cincinnati, 1899).
- The Atonement (Cincinnati, 1900).
- The Immanence of God (Boston, 1905).
- Personalism (Boston, 1908).
- Studies in Christianity (1909).
- A Man's View of Woman Suffrage (Boston, 1910).
- The Essence of Religion (Boston, 1910).
- Kant and Spencer: A Critical Exposition (Boston, 1912).

== See also ==
- George Holmes Howison
- List of American philosophers
- Max Scheler, the primary figure in German personalism
