= Albert C. Knudson =

American theologian (1873–1953)

- Born: Albert Cornelius Knudson; January 23, 1873; Grand Meadow, Minnesota, US
- Died: August 28, 1953 (aged 80); Cambridge, Massachusetts, US
- Spouse: Mathilde Johnson (m. 1899; died 1948)

Academic background
- Education: University of Minnesota; Boston University
- Doctoral advisor: Borden Parker Bowne

Academic work
- Discipline: Theology
- Sub-discipline: Systematic theology
- School or tradition: Boston personalism; Methodism
- Institutions: Boston University

Albert Cornelius Knudson (1873–1953) was a Christian theologian in the Methodist tradition, associated with Boston University and the school of liberal theology known as Boston personalism.

== Biography ==
Albert Cornelius Knudson was born on January 23, 1873, in Grand Meadow, Minnesota. He was the son of the Rev. Asle Knudsen (1844–1939) and Synnove (Fosse) Knudsen (1842–1916), both of whom were immigrants from Norway. The family eventually moved to Minneapolis, Minnesota. Asle Knudsen regularly traveled by train to Lake Mills, Iowa, to minister at the Danish-Norwegian Methodist Church there until shortly before his death in 1939.

Albert Knudson studied at the University of Minnesota, Minneapolis (AB 1893) and Boston University (STB 1896, Ph.D. 1900). He attended Jena University and Berlin University (honorary Th.D. 1923). After teaching briefly at the University of Denver and Baker University, Baldwin City, Kansas, and at Allegheny College, Meadville, Pennsylvania, he began his long career in Boston University where he later became dean of the Boston University School of Theology (1926–1938).

== Personal life ==
Albert Knudson was married to Mathilde Johnson (1872–1948) in 1899. He died on August 28, 1953, at his home in Cambridge, Massachusetts.

== Selected works ==
- The Old Testament Problem (1908)
- Present Tendencies in Religious Thought (1924)
- The Philosophy of Personalism: A Study in the Metaphysics of Religion (1927)
- The Beacon Lights of Prophecy: An Interpretation of Amos Hosea, Isiah, Jeremiah, Ezekiel and Deutero-Isiah (1929)
- The Doctrine of God (1930)
- The Doctrine of Redemption (1933)
- The Validity of Religious Experience (The Fondren lectures) (1937)
- The Principles of Christian Ethics (1943)
- Personalism in Theology with Edgar Sheffield Brightman (1943)
- Basic Issues in Christian Thought (1950)

== Other sources ==
- Deats, Paul (Ed.) (1986) The Boston Personalist Tradition (Mercer University Press) ISBN 978-0865541771
- Brightman, Edgar Sheffield (1979) Personalism in Theology: a Symposium in Honor of Albert Cornelius Knudson by Associates and Former Students (New York: AMS Press. reprint of the 1943 ed. published by Boston University Press) ISBN 0404590861
