= Edgar S. Brightman =

American philosopher and theologian

- Born: Edgar Sheffield Brightman; September 20, 1884; Holbrook, Massachusetts, US
- Died: February 25, 1953 (aged 68); Boston, Massachusetts, US

Education
- Education: Brown University; Boston University; University of Berlin; Marburg University

Philosophical work
- Era: Western philosophy
- Region: Contemporary philosophy
- School: Boston personalism
- Institutions: Nebraska Wesleyan University; Wesleyan University; Boston University
- Doctoral students: L. Harold DeWolf; Georgia Harkness; Martin Luther King Jr.; Warren E. Steinkraus
- Main interests: Theology
- Notable ideas: Transcendent empiricism; rational empiricism; finitistic theism

Edgar Sheffield Brightman (September 20, 1884 – February 25, 1953) was an American philosopher and Christian theologian in the Methodist tradition, associated with Boston University and liberal theology, and promulgated the philosophy known as Boston personalism.

Elected a Fellow of the American Academy of Arts and Sciences in 1928, Brightman served as president of the Eastern Division of the American Philosophical Association in 1936 and the American Academy of Religion in 1942 and 1943.

== Early life and education ==
Brightman was born on September 20, 1884, in Holbrook, Massachusetts, the only child of a Methodist pastor. He studied at Brown University from which he graduated with a BA degree in 1907, and then with an MA degree in 1908. He then proceeded to Boston University where he was awarded the Bachelor of Sacred Theology degree in 1910, followed by a PhD in 1912. He undertook further studies in Germany at the University of Berlin and Marburg University between 1901 and 1910.

While at Brown, Brightman became a brother of Kappa Sigma fraternity.

He was ordained a Methodist minister in 1912.

== Career ==
Brightman was a professional philosopher who taught the subject at Nebraska Wesleyan University between 1912 and 1915. He then took up a post as lecturer in ethics and religion at the Wesleyan University in Connecticut from 1915 to 1919. Finally, he moved to Boston University in 1919 and taught philosophy there until he died on February 25, 1953. From 1925 to 1953 he occupied the Borden Parker Bowne chair of Philosophy.

One of his earliest publications reflected the findings of higher criticism in Old Testament studies concerning the identification of sub-sources and sub-documents within the first six books of the Bible (the Hexateuch). The Documentary Hypothesis that Brightman drew upon had developed in Nineteenth Century German Biblical studies and had received their definitive form in the writings of Julius Wellhausen. Wellhausen, and those who built on his theories, argued that the first five books of the Bible (the Pentateuch) were a composite creation drawing on four original sources and edited into their final form in the fourth century BC. These conclusions ran counter to the traditional Jewish and Christian position that Moses received the Pentateuch from God, with little if any further modification. Brightman was attacked for his pro-Wellhausian views by conservative and fundamentalist Methodists, and blacklisted.

In his involvement with the Methodist Church in America, Brightman joined the Methodist Federation for Social Action. He also supported conscientious objectors in war, was a member of the American Civil Liberties Union, and also the Committee on Peace through Justice.

== Philosophical stance ==
Brightman's philosophical views were influenced by the thought of Borden Parker Bowne (1847–1910). Bowne, who was a Methodist philosopher, emphasized the importance of personality and self-image, and encapsulated his ideas in the expression "transcendental empiricism". By this Bowne meant that there was an existent reality beyond mere human sensory perceptions. He held to the importance of intuition in understanding reality, and upheld the role of human free will. In many ways Bowne's work on personality anticipated some of the views of Sigmund Freud, and even Albert Einstein's findings on the relativity of time and space. Bowne's emphasis on personality led to his philosophical views being known by the term personalism.

Brightman was an advocate of Bowne's position on personality, and those who gathered around both Bowne's and Brightman's writings became known as a movement called Boston personalism. In Brightman's system of thought the human self is the dominant metaphysical reality. His philosophical method in argument is known as rational empiricism.

In addition to building on Bowne's position, Brightman is credited with developing a metaphysical view in the philosophy of religion called finitistic theism. He developed the concept of a finite God to solve the problem of evil. He held the view that God is an infinite personal spirit but his power is limited. For Brightman God is a self-limited being whose good will though perfect is constrained by God's own nature. There is a dynamic relationship between God and the world that grows and develops, or is in process. In Brightman's thought God's purposes intend good for the world, yet pain and suffering occur. He did not argue for God having unlimited power over evil and suffering, but rather maintained that through the processes of the world and history evil will be overcome. In effect, God uses the tragedies of the creation as instruments that enable the world to reach its final goal.

Brightman's views about the growing and developing relationship between God and the world has strong affinities with process philosophy as espoused by Alfred North Whitehead and Charles Hartshorne. Indeed, Hartshorne and Brightman maintained a lengthy and lively correspondence on these matters for a period of some twenty three years. Another important (yet in this case almost entirely overlooked) influence on Brightman’s later thinking was Akhilananda. As Brightman’s colleague L. Harold DeWolf noted in his contribution to a 1972 festschrift for Akhilananda: “Dr. Brightman had a deep and personal appreciation and affection for the gifted leader of the Ramakrishna Mission in Boston.” And as Brightman himself went on to conclude (1952), “mystical experience and the God realized in that experience are of the highest possible consciousness. The language of super consciousness may be used, but that is not to convey the idea of a stage that is absolutely unconscious. On the contrary it always refers to sat-chit-ananda, a combination of being, knowledge, and bliss, which utterly transcends ordinary consciousness, yet is itself consciousness of the highest possible kind. This, of course, is what Western personalists and theists mean by divine personality.“

Brightman was a teacher and mentor to Martin Luther King Jr. as King pursued his PhD at Boston University in the early 1950s. (Following Brightman's death, DeWolf, who had himself received his 1935 PhD in philosophy studying under Brightman, became King's dissertation adviser and another key influence on King's theological and philosophical thinking). King stated: “How I long now for that religious experience which Dr. Brightman so cogently speaks of throughout his book A Philosophy of Religion. It seems to be an experience, the lack of which life becomes dull and meaningless” (Papers 1:415–416); in his application to the PhD program in systematic theology at Boston University King had noted, “my thinking in philosophical areas has been greatly influenced by some of the faculty members there, particularly Dr. Brightman” (Papers 1:390). Brightman's influence is also reflected in King's philosophy of Nonviolence, most markedly in the sixth and most fundamental principle of King's philosophy of Nonviolence, "The arc of the moral universe is long, but it bends toward justice" (the restatement of a metaphysical and ethical position articulated earlier by the Unitarian minister and abolitionist Theodore Parker (1810 - 1860)).

== Death ==
Brightman died from a heart attack on 25 February 1953. His memorial service was held at Newton Center Methodist Church and he was buried in Mystic, Connecticut.

== Bibliography ==
- The Sources of the Hexateuch (New York: Abingdon, 1918)
- Introduction to Philosophy (New York: H. Holt, 1925)
- Immortality in Post-Kantian Idealism (the Ingersoll Lecture, Cambridge, Massachusetts: Harvard University Press, 1925)
- Religious Values (New York: Abingdon, 1925)
- Philosophy of Ideals (New York: H. Holt, 1928)
- Problem of God (New York: Abingdon, 1930)
- The Finding of God (New York: Abingdon, 1931)
- Is God A Person? (New York: Association Press, 1932)
- Moral Laws (New York: Abingdon, 1933)
- Personality and Religion (New York: Abingdon, 1934)
- The Future of Christianity (New York: Abingdon, 1937)
- A Philosophy of Religion (New York: Prentice-Hall, 1940)
- The Spiritual Life (New York: Abingdon-Cokesbury, 1942)
- Nature and Values (New York: Abingdon-Cokesbury, 1945)
- Persons and Values (Boston: Boston University Press, 1952)
- ed., Personalism in Theology: A Symposium in Honor of Albert Cornelius Knudson (Boston: Boston University Press, 1943)
- Studies in Personalism: Selected Writings of Edgar Sheffield Brightman; edited by Warren Steinkraus (Utica: Meridian, 1987)
