= 28th Academy Awards =

- Date: March 21, 1956
- Site: RKO Pantages Theatre, Hollywood, California, NBC Century Theatre; New York City, New York
- Hosted by: Jerry Lewis (Los Angeles), Claudette Colbert (New York) and Joseph L. Mankiewicz (New York)
- Produced by: Robert Emmett Dolan
- Directed by: George Seaton

Highlights
- Best Picture: Marty
- Most awards: Marty (4)
- Most nominations: Love Is a Many-Splendored Thing, Marty, and The Rose Tattoo (8)

TV in the United States
- Network: NBC

The 28th Academy Awards were held on March 21, 1956, to honor the films of 1955, at the RKO Pantages Theatre in Los Angeles, California. In this year, Jerry Lewis became the host, replacing Bob Hope.

At just 90 minutes, Marty became the shortest film to win Best Picture, as well as the second to have also won the Palme d'Or at the Cannes Film Festival (after The Lost Weekend in 1945). All of the various winners, with the exception of Anna Magnani, collected their Oscars.

Grace Kelly, soon to be Princess of Monaco, attended the ceremony as a presenter on her way toward retirement from acting. She was chided by Louella Parsons for failing to acknowledge Lewis' tribute to her from the film business. Parsons wrote, "it seems she might have taken a moment to thank him, give him a little kiss or something before leaving the stage so abruptly."

For the first time in history, all four acting winners were first-time nominees.

This was the final year in which the Best Foreign Language Film was a Special/Honorary award. Beginning with the 29th Academy Awards, it became a competitive category.

== Winners and nominees ==
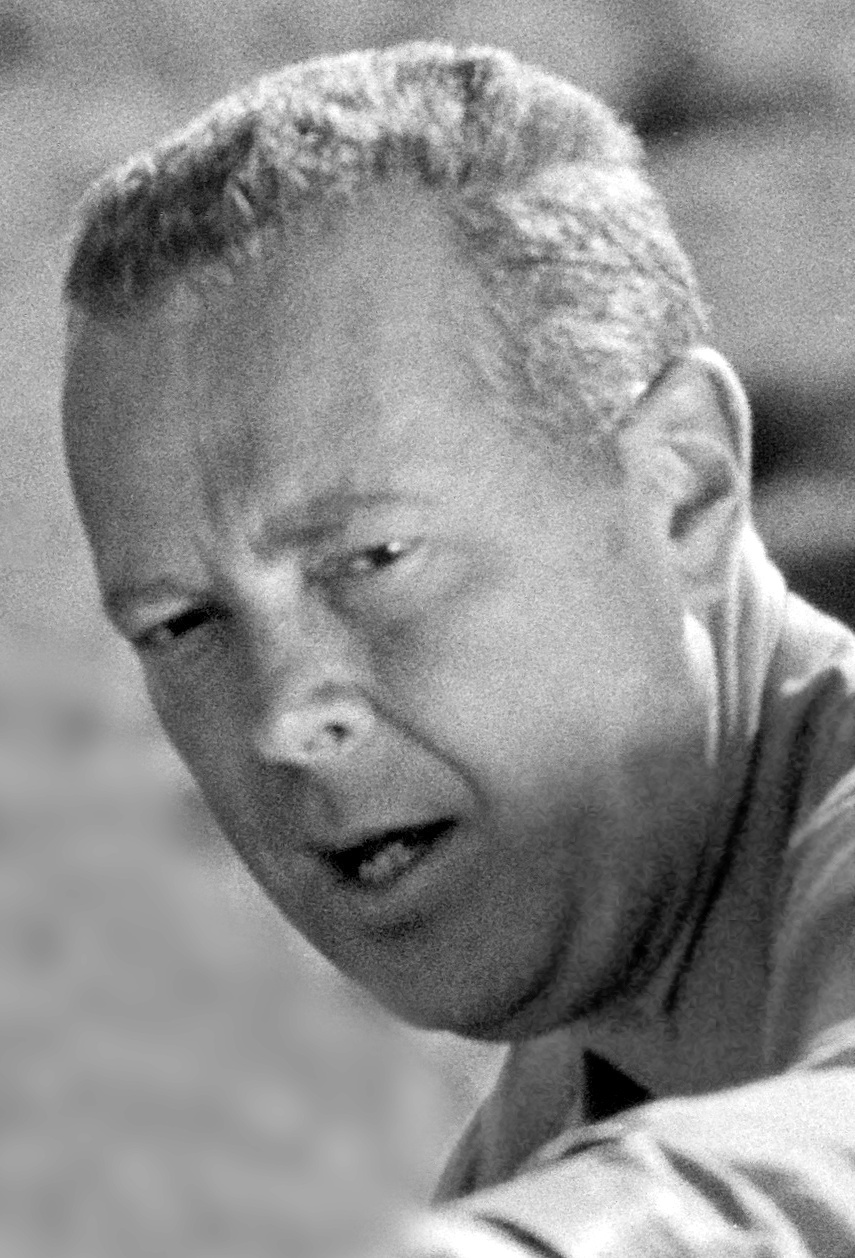
Delbert Mann, Best Director winner

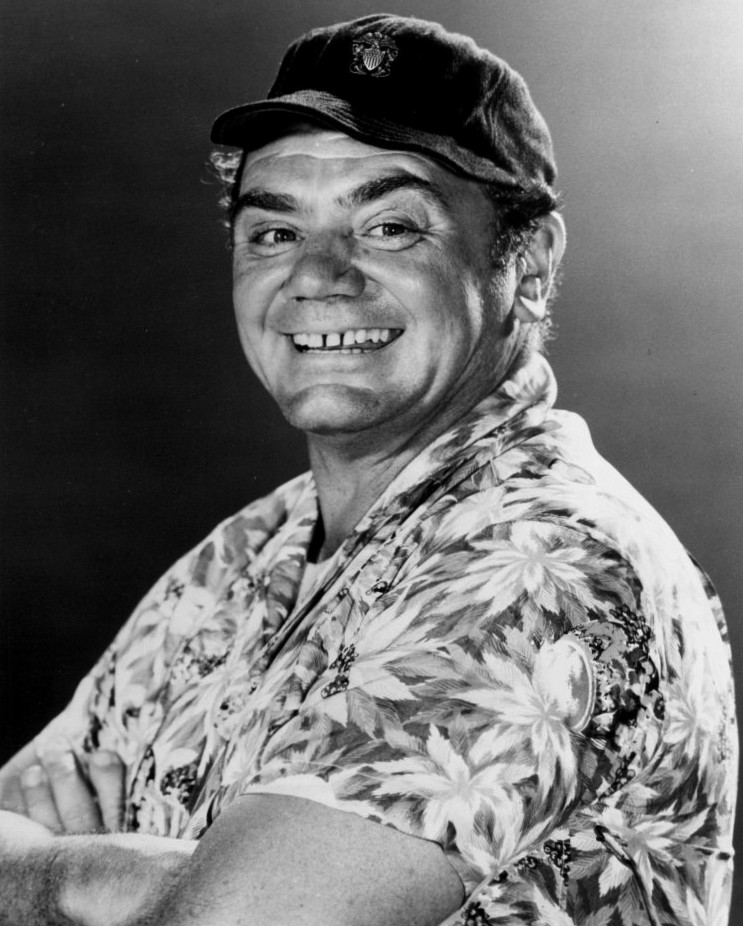
Ernest Borgnine; Best Actor winner

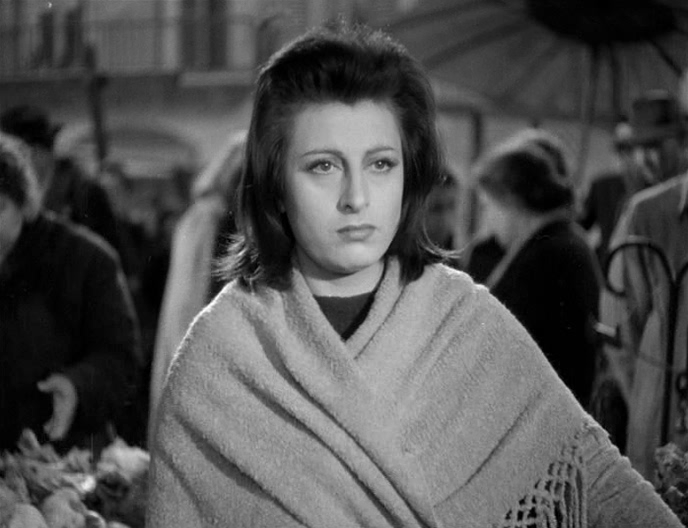
Anna Magnani; Best Actress winner

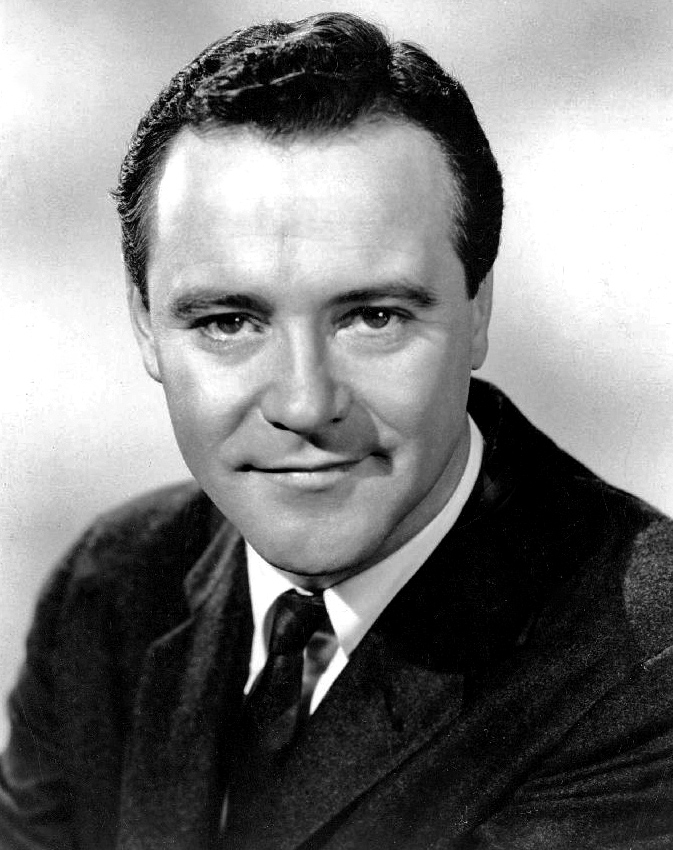
Jack Lemmon; Best Supporting Actor winner

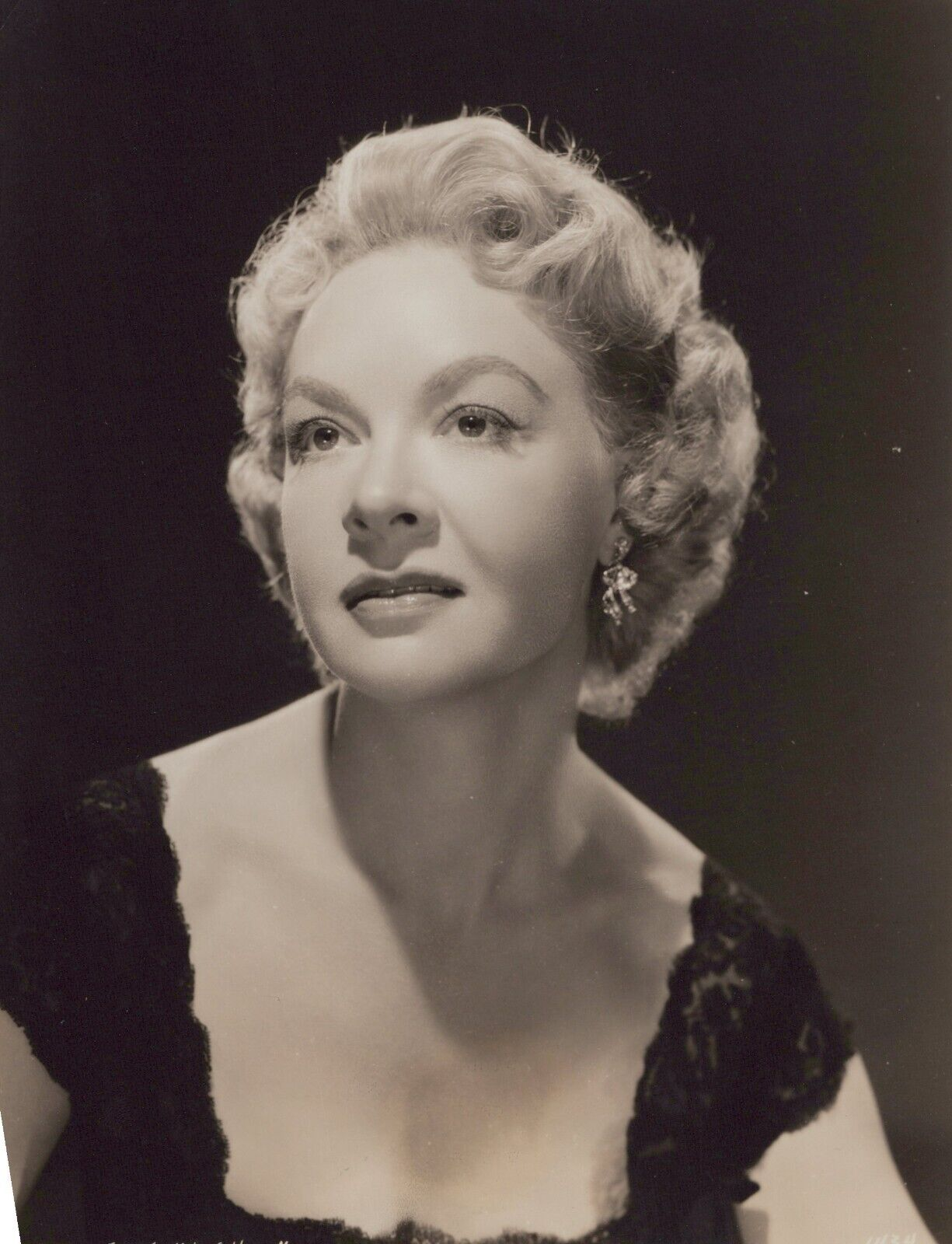
Jo Van Fleet; Best Supporting Actress winner

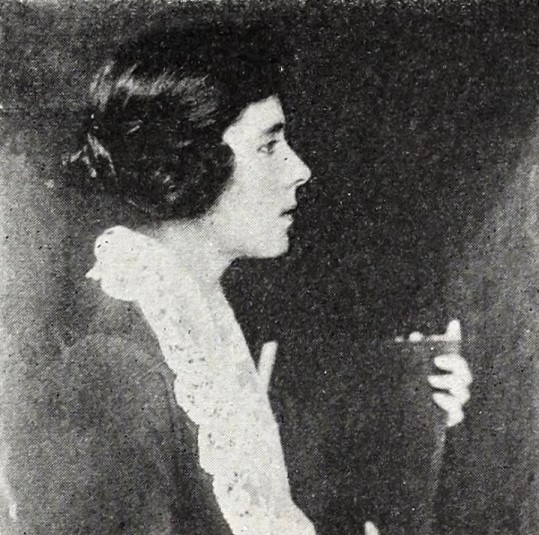
Sonya Levien, Best Story and Screenplay co-winner

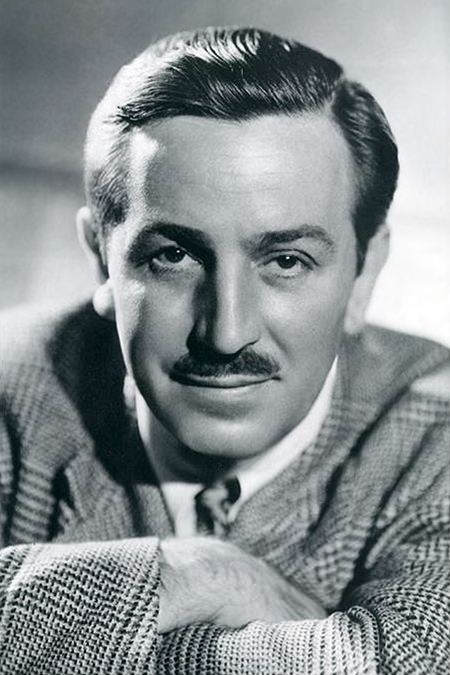
Walt Disney; Best Documentary Short Subject winner

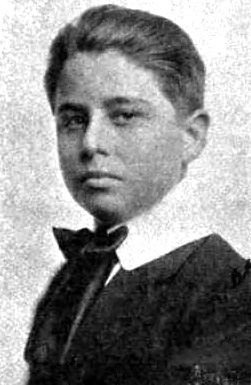
Alfred Newman, Best Scoring of a Dramatic or Comedy Picture winner

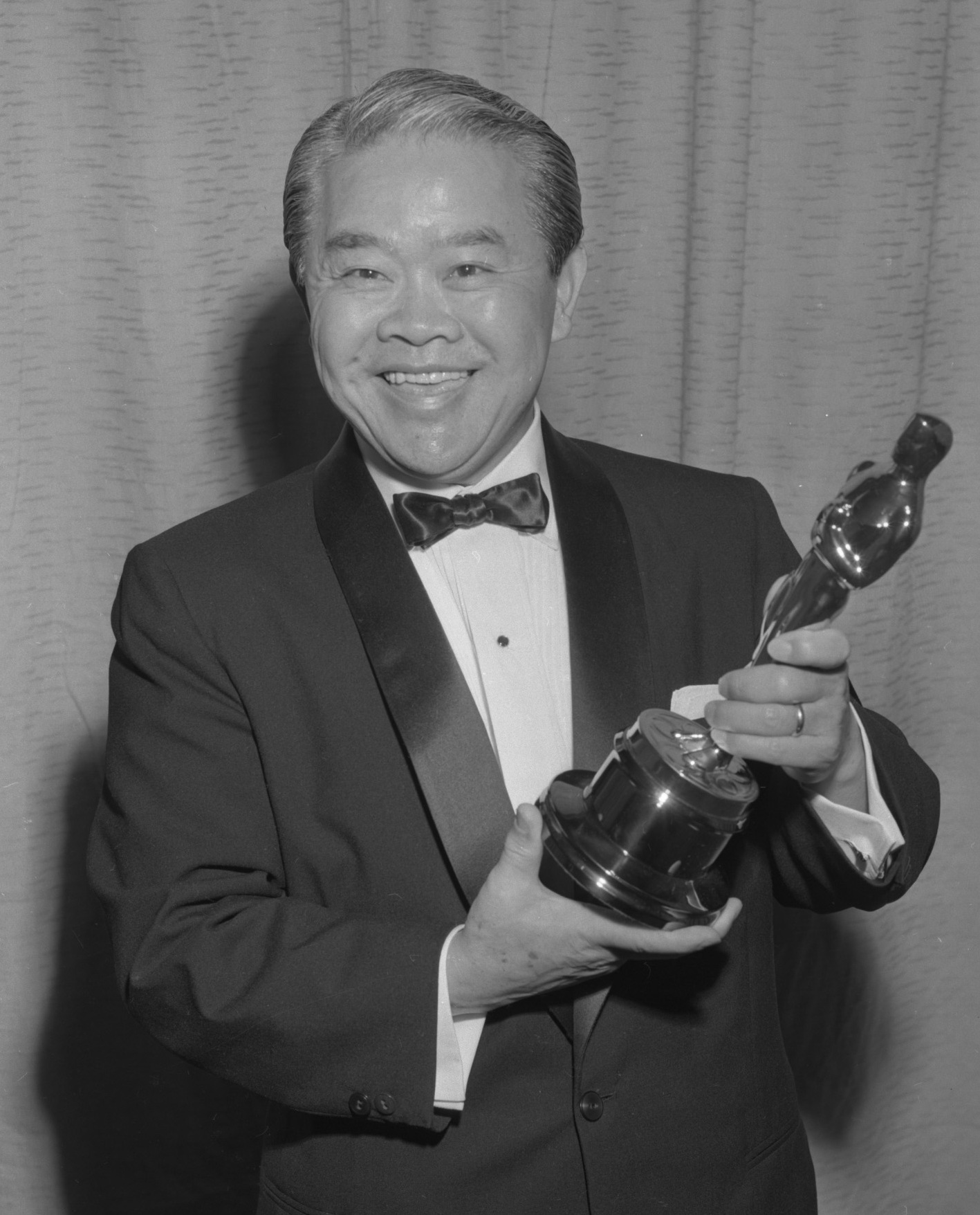
James Wong Howe; Best Cinematography, Black-and-White winner

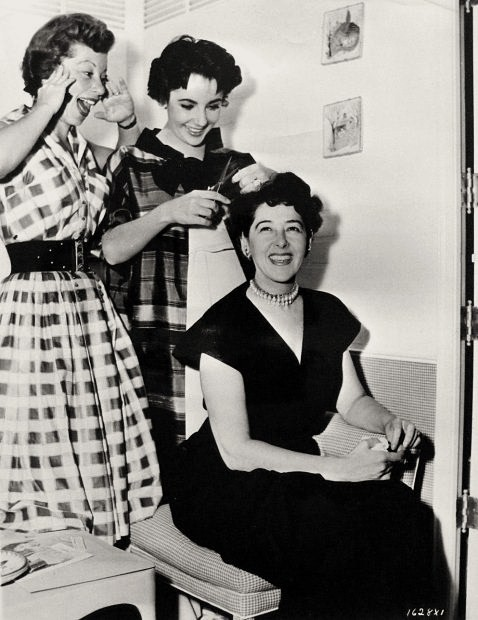
Helen Rose, Best Costume Design, Black-and-White winner

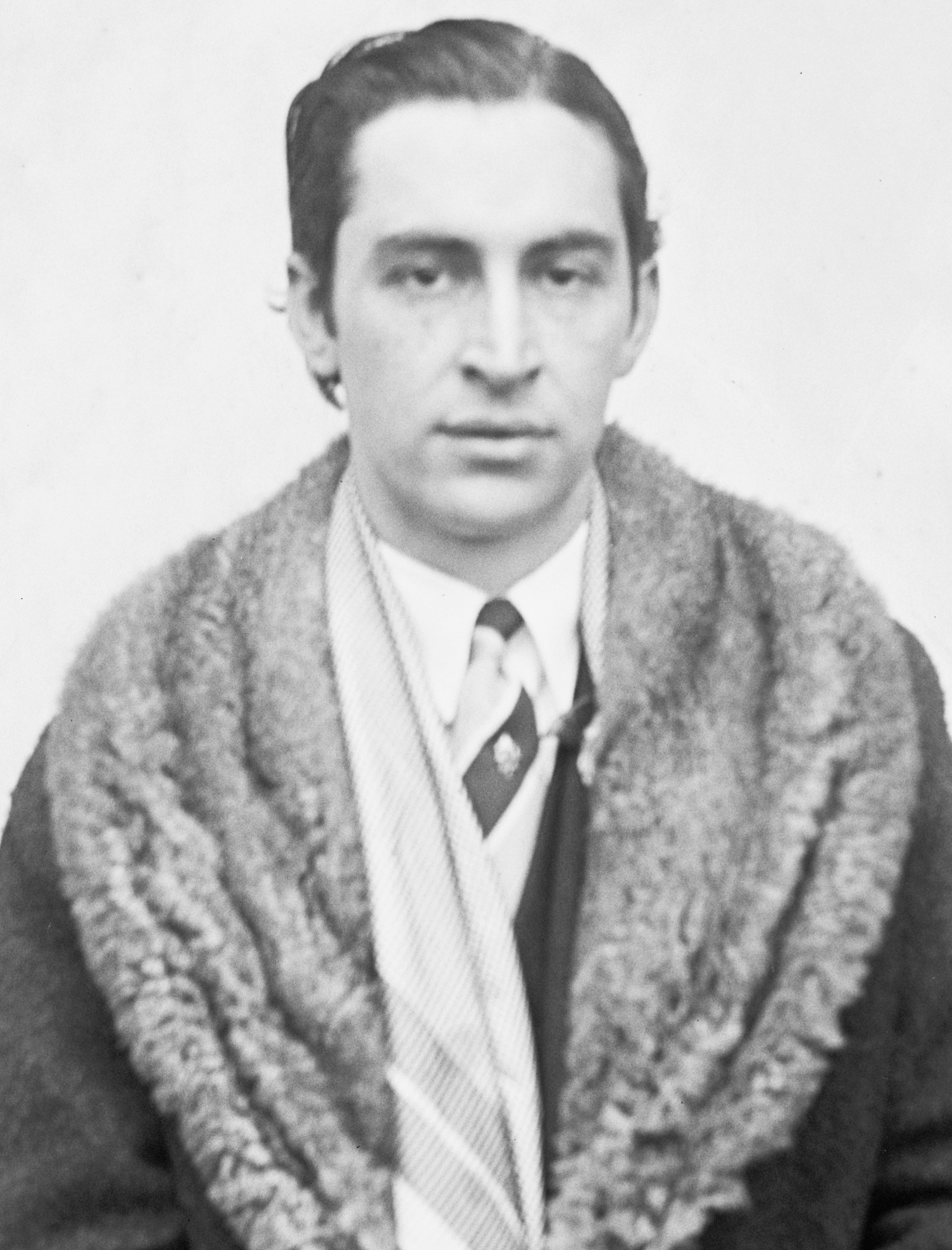
Charles LeMaire; Best Costume Design, Color winner

=== Awards ===
Nominees were announced on February 18, 1956. Winners are listed first and highlighted in boldface.

**Best Motion Picture**: **Marty – Harold Hecht for United Artists**; Love Is a Many-Splendored Thing – Buddy Adler for 20th Century Fox; Mister Roberts – Leland Hayward for Warner Bros.; Picnic – Fred Kohlmar for Columbia Pictures; The Rose Tattoo – Hal B. Wallis for Paramount Pictures	**Best Directing**: **Delbert Mann – Marty**; John Sturges – Bad Day at Black Rock; Elia Kazan – East of Eden; Joshua Logan – Picnic; David Lean – Summertime
**Best Actor**: **Ernest Borgnine – Marty as Marty Piletti**; James Cagney – Love Me or Leave Me as Martin Snyder; James Dean (posthumous nomination) – East of Eden as Caleb Trask; Frank Sinatra – The Man with the Golden Arm as Frankie "Dealer" Machine; Spencer Tracy – Bad Day at Black Rock as John J. Macreedy	**Best Actress**: **Anna Magnani – The Rose Tattoo as Serafina Delle Rose**; Susan Hayward – I'll Cry Tomorrow as Lillian Roth; Katharine Hepburn – Summertime as Jane Hudson; Jennifer Jones – Love Is a Many-Splendored Thing as Dr. Han Suyin; Eleanor Parker – Interrupted Melody as Marjorie Lawrence
**Best Actor in a Supporting Role**: **Jack Lemmon – Mister Roberts as Ensign Frank Thurlowe Pulver**; Arthur Kennedy – Trial as Bernard Castle; Joe Mantell – Marty as Angie; Sal Mineo – Rebel Without a Cause as John "Plato" Crawford; Arthur O'Connell – Picnic as Howard Bevans	**Best Actress in a Supporting Role**: **Jo Van Fleet – East of Eden as Cathy Ames/Kate Trask**; Betsy Blair – Marty as Clara; Peggy Lee – Pete Kelly's Blues as Rose Hopkins; Marisa Pavan – The Rose Tattoo as Rosa Delle Rose; Natalie Wood – Rebel Without a Cause as Judy
**Best Writing (Motion Picture Story)**: **Love Me or Leave Me – Daniel Fuchs**; The Private War of Major Benson – Joe Connelly and Bob Mosher; Rebel Without a Cause – Nicholas Ray; The Sheep Has Five Legs – Jean Marsan, Henri Troyat, Jacques Perret, Henri Verneuil, and Raoul Ploquin; Strategic Air Command – Beirne Lay Jr.	**Best Writing (Story and Screenplay)**: **Interrupted Melody – William Ludwig and Sonya Levien**; The Court-Martial of Billy Mitchell – Milton Sperling and Emmet Lavery; It's Always Fair Weather – Betty Comden and Adolph Green; Mr. Hulot's Holiday – Jacques Tati and Henri Marquet; The Seven Little Foys – Melville Shavelson and Jack Rose
**Best Writing (Screenplay)**: **Marty – Paddy Chayefsky from Marty by Paddy Chayefsky**; Bad Day at Black Rock – Millard Kaufman from "Bad Time at Honda" by Howard Breslin; Blackboard Jungle – Richard Brooks from Blackboard Jungle by Evan Hunter; East of Eden – Paul Osborn from East of Eden by John Steinbeck; Love Me or Leave Me – Daniel Fuchs and Isobel Lennart	**Best Documentary (Feature)**: **Helen Keller in Her Story – Nancy Hamilton**; Heartbreak Ridge – René Risacher
**Best Documentary (Short Subject)**: **Men Against the Arctic** – **Walt Disney**; The Battle of Gettysburg – Dore Schary; The Face of Lincoln – Wilbur T. Blume	**Best Short Subject (One-Reel)**: **Survival City – Edmund Reek**; 3rd Ave. El – Carson Davidson; Gadgets Galore – Robert Youngson; Three Kisses – Justin Herman
**Best Short Subject (Two-Reel)**: **The Face of Lincoln – Wilbur T. Blume**; 24 Hour Alert – Cedric Francis; The Battle of Gettysburg – Dore Schary; On the Twelfth Day – George K. Arthur; Switzerland – Walt Disney	**Best Short Subject (Cartoon)**: **Speedy Gonzales – Edward Selzer**; Good Will to Men – Fred Quimby, William Hanna, and Joseph Barbera; The Legend of Rockabye Point – Walter Lantz; No Hunting – Walt Disney
**Best Music (Music Score of a Dramatic or Comedy Picture)**: **Love Is a Many-Splendored Thing – Alfred Newman**; Battle Cry – Max Steiner; The Man with the Golden Arm – Elmer Bernstein; Picnic – George Duning; The Rose Tattoo – Alex North	**Best Music (Scoring of a Musical Picture)**: **Oklahoma! – Robert Russell Bennett, Jay Blackton and Adolph Deutsch**; Daddy Long Legs – Alfred Newman; Guys and Dolls – Jay Blackton and Cyril J. Mockridge; It's Always Fair Weather – André Previn; Love Me or Leave Me – Percy Faith and Georgie Stoll
**Best Music (Song)**: **"Love Is a Many-Splendored Thing" from Love Is a Many-Splendored Thing – Music by Sammy Fain; Lyrics by Paul Francis Webster**; "I'll Never Stop Loving You" from Love Me or Leave Me – Music by Nicholas Brodszky; Lyrics by Sammy Cahn; "Something's Gotta Give" from Daddy Long Legs – Music and Lyrics by Johnny Mercer; "The Tender Trap" from The Tender Trap – Music by Jimmy Van Heusen; Lyrics by Sammy Cahn; "Unchained Melody" from Unchained – Music by Alex North; Lyrics by Hy Zaret	**Best Sound Recording**: **Oklahoma! – Fred Hynes**; Love Is a Many-Splendored Thing – Carlton W. Faulkner; Love Me or Leave Me – Wesley C. Miller; Mister Roberts – William A. Mueller; Not as a Stranger – Watson Jones
**Best Art Direction (Black-and-White)**: **The Rose Tattoo – Art Direction: Hal Pereira and Tambi Larsen; Set Decoration: Samuel M. Comer and Arthur Krams**; Blackboard Jungle – Art Direction: Cedric Gibbons and Randall Duell; Set Decoration: Edwin B. Willis and Henry Grace; I'll Cry Tomorrow – Art Direction: Cedric Gibbons and Malcolm Brown; Set Decoration: Edwin B. Willis and Hugh Hunt; The Man with the Golden Arm – Art Direction: Joseph C. Wright; Set Decoration: Darrell Silvera; Marty – Art Direction: Ted Haworth and Walter M. Simonds; Set Decoration: Robert Priestley	**Best Art Direction (Color)**: **Picnic – Art Direction: William Flannery and Jo Mielziner; Set Decoration: Robert Priestley**; Daddy Long Legs – Art Direction: Lyle R. Wheeler and John DeCuir; Set Decoration: Walter M. Scott and Paul S. Fox; Guys and Dolls – Art Direction: Oliver Smith and Joseph C. Wright; Set Decoration: Howard Bristol; Love Is a Many-Splendored Thing – Art Direction: Lyle R. Wheeler and George Davis; Set Decoration: Walter M. Scott and Jack Stubbs; To Catch a Thief – Art Direction: Hal Pereira and Joseph McMillan Johnson; Set Decoration: Samuel M. Comer and Arthur Krams
**Best Cinematography (Black-and-White)**: **The Rose Tattoo – James Wong Howe**; Blackboard Jungle – Russell Harlan; I'll Cry Tomorrow – Arthur Arling; Marty – Joseph LaShelle; Queen Bee – Charles Lang	**Best Cinematography (Color)**: **To Catch a Thief – Robert Burks**; Guys and Dolls – Harry Stradling; Love Is a Many-Splendored Thing – Leon Shamroy; A Man Called Peter – Harold Lipstein; Oklahoma! – Robert Surtees
**Best Costume Design (Black-and-White)**: **I'll Cry Tomorrow – Helen Rose**; The Pickwick Papers – Beatrice Dawson; Queen Bee – Jean Louis; The Rose Tattoo – Edith Head; Ugetsu – Tadaoto Kainosho	**Best Costume Design (Color)**: **Love Is a Many-Splendored Thing – Charles LeMaire**; Guys and Dolls – Irene Sharaff; Interrupted Melody – Helen Rose; To Catch a Thief – Edith Head; The Virgin Queen – Charles LeMaire and Mary Wills
**Best Film Editing**: **Picnic – Charles Nelson and William Lyon**; Blackboard Jungle – Ferris Webster; The Bridges at Toko-Ri – Alma Macrorie; Oklahoma! – Gene Ruggiero and George Boemler; The Rose Tattoo – Warren Low	**Best Special Effects**: **The Bridges at Toko-Ri – Paramount Studio**; The Dam Busters – Associated British Picture Corporation, Ltd.; The Rains of Ranchipur – 20th Century-Fox Studio

=== Honorary Foreign Language Film Award ===
- To Samurai, The Legend of Musashi (Japan) - Best Foreign Language Film first released in the United States during 1955.

== Presenters and performers ==
=== Presenters ===
- Eva Marie Saint (Presenter: Best Supporting Actor)
- Ernest Borgnine (Presenter: Best Story & Screenplay)
- James Cagney (Presenter: Best Special Effects)
- Cantinflas (Presenter: Cinematography Awards)
- Maurice Chevalier (Presenter: Best Original Song)
- Mel Ferrer and Claire Trevor (Presenter: Scientific and Technical Awards)
- Susan Hayward (Presenter: Costume Design Awards)
- Audrey Hepburn (Presenter: Best Motion Picture)
- Jennifer Jones (Presenter: Best Director)
- Grace Kelly (Presenter: Best Actor)
- Peggy Lee and Jack Lemmon (Presenters: Art Direction Awards)
- Marlon Brando (Presenter: Best Actress—reading from a film clip shot in Manila)
- Jerry Lewis (Presenter: Best Film Editing and Best Actress)
- Anna Magnani (Presenter: Best Screenplay)
- Sal Mineo (Presenter: Best Sound Recording)
- Edmond O'Brien (Presenter: Best Supporting Actress)
- Eleanor Parker (Presenter: Documentary Awards)
- Marisa Pavan, Arthur O'Connell and Jo Van Fleet (Presenters: Short Subjects Awards)
- Frank Sinatra and Jerry Lewis (Presenters: Best Music Score Awards)

=== Performers ===
- André Previn – Conductor the Academy Awards orchestra
- Harry Belafonte ("Unchained Melody" from Unchained)
- Maurice Chevalier ("Something's Gotta Give" from Daddy Long Legs)
- Eddie Fisher ("Love Is a Many-Splendored Thing" from Love Is a Many-Splendored Thing)
- Dean Martin ("(Love Is) The Tender Trap" from The Tender Trap)
- Jane Powell ("I'll Never Stop Loving You" from Love Me or Leave Me)

== Multiple nominations and awards ==
Films with multiple nominations
Nominations	Film
8	Love Is a Many-Splendored Thing
8	Marty
8	The Rose Tattoo
6	Love Me or Leave Me
6	Picnic
4	Blackboard Jungle
4	East of Eden
4	Guys and Dolls
4	I'll Cry Tomorrow
4	Oklahoma!
3	Bad Day at Black Rock
3	Daddy Long Legs
3	Interrupted Melody
3	The Man with the Golden Arm
3	Mister Roberts
3	Rebel Without a Cause
3	To Catch a Thief
2	The Battle of Gettysburg
2	The Bridges at Toko-Ri
2	The Face of Lincoln
2	It's Always Fair Weather
2	Queen Bee
2	Summertime

Films with multiple awards
Awards	Film
4	Marty
3	Love Is a Many-Splendored Thing
3	The Rose Tattoo
2	Oklahoma!
2	Picnic

== See also ==
- 13th Golden Globe Awards
- 1955 in film
- 7th Primetime Emmy Awards
- 8th Primetime Emmy Awards
- 9th British Academy Film Awards
- 10th Tony Awards
