= Ralph Flewelling =

Ralph Flewelling may refer to:

- Ralph Tyler Flewelling (1871–?), American philosophy professor
- Ralph Carlin Flewelling (1894–1975), American architect
