= Love Is a Many-Splendored Thing (film) =

1955 film by Henry King

- Original film poster
- Directed by: Henry King
- Screenplay by: John Patrick
- Based on: A Many-Splendoured Thing; 1952 book by Han Suyin
- Produced by: Buddy Adler
- Starring: Jennifer Jones; William Holden
- Cinematography: Leon Shamroy
- Edited by: William H. Reynolds
- Music by: Alfred Newman; Sammy Fain title song
- Distributed by: Twentieth Century-Fox Film Corporation
- Release date: August 18, 1955
- Running time: 102 minutes
- Country: United States
- Language: English
- Budget: $1.78 million
- Box office: $4 million (US and Canada rentals)

Love Is a Many-Splendored Thing is a 1955 Deluxe color American romantic drama in CinemaScope. Set in 1949–50 in Hong Kong, it tells the story of a married, but separated, American reporter Mark Elliot (played by William Holden), who falls in love with a Eurasian doctor originally from China, Han Suyin (played by Jennifer Jones), only to encounter prejudice from her family and from Hong Kong society.

The film was adapted by John Patrick from the 1952 autobiographical novel A Many-Splendoured Thing by Han Suyin. The film was directed by Henry King.

The film later inspired a television soap opera in 1967, though without the hyphen in the show's title.

== Plot ==
A widowed Eurasian doctor Han Suyin (Jones) falls in love with a married-but-separated American correspondent Mark Elliott (Holden) in Hong Kong, during the period of China's Civil War in the late 1940s. Although they find brief happiness together, she is ostracized by the greater Chinese community. After losing her position at the hospital, Suyin and her adopted daughter go to live with a friend while Mark is on an assignment during the Korean War. They write to each other constantly. She receives word that Mark was killed and she goes to visit their favorite hilltop meeting place. In his last letter, which she receives that same day, he reminds her to be grateful, no matter what happens to him, because they got to experience "that many-splendored thing" which many people never do.

== Cast ==
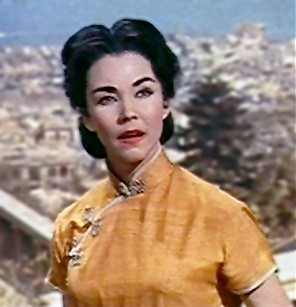
Jennifer Jones as Dr. Han Suyin

- William Holden as Mark Elliott
- Jennifer Jones as Dr. Han Suyin
- Torin Thatcher as Humphrey Palmer-Jones
- Isobel Elsom as Adeline Palmer-Jones
- Murray Matheson as Dr. John Keith
- Virginia Gregg as Anne Richards
- Richard Loo as Robert Hung
- Soo Yong as Nora Hung
- Philip Ahn as Third Uncle
- Jorja Curtright as Suzanne
- Donna Martell as Suchen, Suyin's sister
- James Hong (uncredited)
- Keye Luke (uncredited)

== Production ==
The rights to the novel were bought by David Brown of 20th Century Fox for the producer Sol C. Siegel. However, when he left the company the project was given to Buddy Adler. The screenplay struggled to get Motion Picture Production Code approval because of its themes of adultery and miscegenation.

Parts of the film were shot on location in Hong Kong by second-unit director Otto Lang, which was unusual for its time. Two weeks of location filming in Hong Kong had been completed before the final screenplay had been finished by screenwriter John Patrick. He then had to adapt the screenplay to include as many of the shots as possible.

Despite the film's romantic subject and their chemistry on the screen, Holden and Jones could barely stand each other on set. Holden was turned off by Jones's obsessive involvement with her character and complaints about her makeup (which she said made her "look old"), about her costumes and about her dialogue. Soon, they were barely speaking to one another. According to Holden's biography, Jones was also generally rude and abrasive to everyone involved in the production. Their relationship was also not helped by Jones's worries about Holden's reputation as a womanizer. Holden claimed that she chewed garlic before her love scenes, which she may have done to discourage him. Once, Holden tried to make peace, offering Jones a bouquet of white roses, which she tossed back in his face.

The film was completed on time, within the planned three-months schedule. Indonesian director, J. Cabin Joe, made an uncredited role in the film where he appeared along with Holden.

=== Locations ===
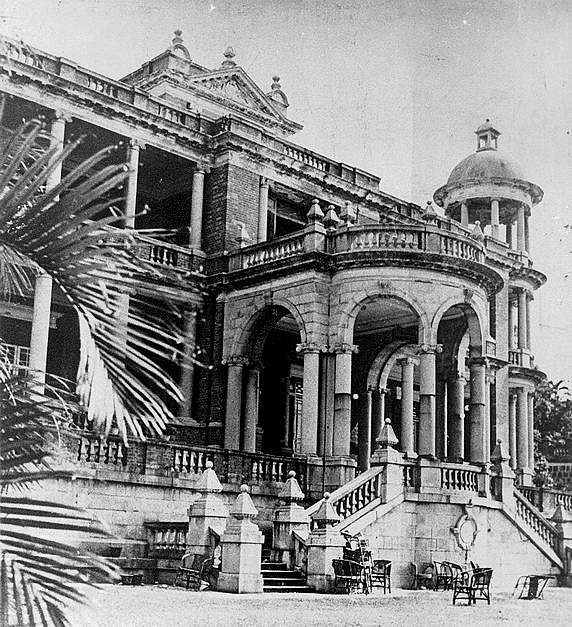
The Foreign Correspondents' Club, then located at 41A Conduit Road, is portrayed in the film as a hospital. The building was demolished in the late 1960s.

- The former Mok residence located at 41A Conduit Road became the Foreign Correspondents' Club in 1951. In the film it is portrayed as a hospital. The building is now demolished and Realty Gardens apartment complex has occupied the site since 1970.
- The former colonial-style Repulse Bay Hotel, demolished in 1982, and now the site of The Repulse Bay apartment building.
- The Tai Pak Floating Restaurant, now part of the Jumbo Kingdom.
- The famous hill-top meeting place where the lovers used to meet was filmed in rural California at Fox Ranch Malibu, and the backdrop was filmed in Repulse Bay, Hong Kong.

== Reception ==
Variety characterized it as "beautiful, absorbing."

The film earned rentals of $4 million in the United States of America and Canada.

In Ireland and the Canadian province of Quebec, local censors did not like the suggestions of divorce and cut the film to make it appear that Holden was single.

On the review aggregator website Rotten Tomatoes, 53% of 17 critics' reviews are positive.

== Awards and nominations ==
Award	Category	Nominee(s)	Result	Ref.
Academy Awards	Best Motion Picture	Buddy Adler	Nominated	
Academy Awards	Best Actress	Jennifer Jones	Nominated	
Academy Awards	Best Art Direction – Color	Art Direction: Lyle R. Wheeler and George Davis; Set Decoration: Walter M. Scott and Jack Stubbs	Nominated	
Academy Awards	Best Cinematography – Color	Leon Shamroy	Nominated	
Academy Awards	Best Costume Design – Color	Charles LeMaire	Won	
Academy Awards	Best Scoring of a Dramatic or Comedy Picture	Alfred Newman	Won	
Academy Awards	Best Song	"Love Is a Many-Splendored Thing"; Music by Sammy Fain; Lyrics by Paul Francis Webster	Won	
Academy Awards	Best Sound Recording	Carlton W. Faulkner	Nominated	
Golden Globe Awards	Best Film Promoting International Understanding	Henry King	Won	
New York Film Critics Circle Awards	Best Actress	Jennifer Jones	Nominated	
Photoplay Awards	Gold Medal		Won	

- In 2002, the film ranked #85 on AFI's 100 Years... 100 Passions.

== Soundtrack ==
The music was commissioned from Sammy Fain and Paul Francis Webster as background music. It was extensively developed and woven into the film's orchestral score by Alfred Newman and his choral director Ken Darby. To make it eligible for the Best Original Song category of the Academy Awards lyrics were subsequently added. The original lyrics were rejected by the studio so new ones were written. The resulting sentimental and upbeat song, "Love is a Many-Splendored Thing" was one of the first songs written for a movie to reach No. 1 in the charts in the same year.

The song was subsequently recorded by The Four Aces and also by Jerry Vale, Nat King Cole, Danny Williams, and Frank Sinatra, among others. Italian-language versions were recorded by Nancy Cuomo, Neil Sedaka, and Connie Francis. Francis also recorded the song with its original English lyrics, and a German-language version, Sag, weißt du denn, was Liebe ist.

The song's lyrics relate:

Love is nature's way of giving
a reason to be living,
The golden crown that makes a man a king.

During the film, charged romantic moments occur on a high grassy, windswept hill in Hong Kong. In the bittersweet final scene on the hilltop, the song (heard on the soundtrack) recalls the earlier encounters:

Once on a high and windy hill,
In the morning mist, Two lovers kissed,
And the world stood still.

The theme song won the Academy Award for Best Song, and the recording by The Four Aces went to #1 on the charts for three weeks in 1955, shortly before rock and roll became a dominant force on the charts. Newman's orchestral score, which made heavy use of Fain's tune, also received an Oscar.

Varèse Sarabande made the complete original soundtrack available on compact disc in 2002, limiting the pressing to 2,000 copies.

== See also ==
- List of American films of 1955
- List of films set in Hong Kong

== Bibliography ==
- Epstein, Edward Z. (1995). Portrait of Jennifer Jones (Hardback). New York: Simon & Schuster. ISBN 0-671-74056-3.
- Biran, Misbach Yusa, ed. (1979). Apa Siapa Orang Film Indonesia 1926–1978 [What and Who: Film Figures in Indonesia, 1926–1978]. Sinematek Indonesia. OCLC 6655859.
