= Bust of Sherman Minton =

Public artwork by Robert Merrell Gage

Sherman Minton
- Artist: Robert Merrell Gage
- Year: 1956
- Type: Sculpture
- Dimensions: 61 cm × 76.8 cm × 32.4 cm (24 in × 30.25 in × 12.75 in)
- Location: Indiana Statehouse; Indianapolis, Indiana, United States; 39°46′7.54″N 86°9′45.54″W
- Owner: State of Indiana

The bust of Sherman Minton is a public artwork by American artist Robert Merrell Gage, located on the main floor of the Indiana Statehouse, which is in Indianapolis, Indiana, United States. Cast in bronze in 1956, it was commissioned to honor politician — a United States senator from Indiana and later an Associate Justice of the Supreme Court of the United States.— and Indiana native Sherman Minton.

== Description ==
The bust is made from cast bronze and depicts the subject from the lower shoulders up, clad in a judicial robe. Minton is depicted as middle-aged, mustached, with a moderately receded hairline. His head is rotated slightly to the proper left. Slightly larger than life-size, the piece is 30.25 inches wide at the shoulders, 11.5 inches wide at the head, 24 inches high, and 11.75 inches deep. It is mounted on a stone block in a semi-cylindrical niche. Affixed to the front of the block is a bronze plaque which reads:

SHERMAN MINTON
ASSOCIATE JUSTICE
SUPREME COURT oF THE UNITED STATES
1949–1956
THE FIRST JUSTICE APPOINTED TO THE SUPREME COURT
oF THE UNITED STATES FROM THE STATE oF INDIANA

== Subject ==
Sherman Minton (October 20, 1890 – April 9, 1965) was primarily noted for being a Democratic United States Senator representing Indiana and an Associate United States Supreme Court justice. The first U.S. Supreme Court justice from Indiana, he was a supporter of New Deal legislation as a senator and an advocate of judicial restraint as a court justice. He retired in 1956 due to poor health.

== Historical information ==
The bust was commissioned shortly after Minton's retirement by then-governor of Indiana George N. Craig, paid for out of the governor's contingency fund. It was dedicated on December 21, 1956, at an unveiling ceremony which featured as speakers both Gov. Craig and William T. Fitzgerald, president of the Indiana State Bar Association at that time, in addition to Minton himself.

=== Location history ===
Cast in New York and transported to Indianapolis, the bust was originally housed in a prominent niche outside the governor's office at the statehouse rotunda, displacing a bust of George Washington, which was moved to an upper floor. A statement by the governor's private secretary at the time suggested that this was simply because the Washington bust was made of plaster and the Minton bust of bronze, and that the Minton bust would be a better aesthetic match for an adjoining bronze piece. A 1976 catalog lists the bust's location at the statehouse as the southwest corner pier of the central rotunda, facing south. This continues to be its current location as of 2011.

== Artist ==
A native of Topeka, Kansas, sculptor Robert Merrell Gage (December 26, 1892 – October 30, 1981, often referred to as Merrell Gage) was noted for his numerous public art commissions. His first such commission was for a statue of Abraham Lincoln that is now on the grounds of the Kansas State Capitol. He eventually became a professor of sculpture at the University of Southern California, and it was during his tenure there that he was commissioned to produce the Sherman Minton bust.

== See also ==
- Benjamin Harrison (Peglow)
- Colonel Richard Owen (Kinney Scholz)
- Frank O'Bannon (Ryden)
- Henry F. Schricker (Rubins)
- Matthew E. Welsh (Edwards)
- Otis Bowen (Lanagan)
- Robert D. Orr (Ingle)
- Stephen Neal (Leonard)
