= Pearl Louise Weber =

American philosopher and educator

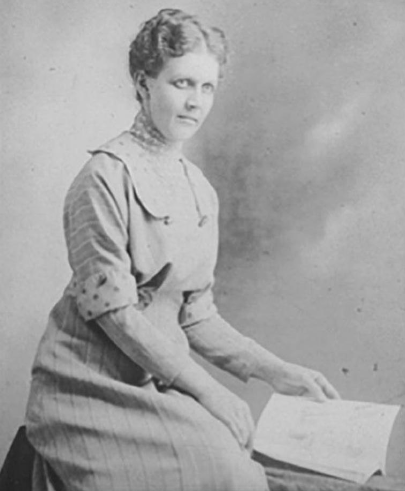
Pearl Louise Hunter in 1916

Pearl Louise Hunter Weber (1878–1975) was an American philosopher and educator.

== Biography ==
Weber was born in Toledo, Ohio in 1878. Her maiden name was Pearl Louise Hunter. She earned a philosophy degree from the University of Chicago in 1899, where she was the first woman to graduate with Phi Beta Kappa honors. Weber entered Cornell University in 1901 with a Sage Fellowship in philosophy and ethics. She married in 1902, and had four children, but eventually separated from her husband and returned to her career. Weber conducted graduate work under John Dewey and received a masters degree in philosophy from the University of Chicago in 1920.

Weber became a department head at Illinois Woman's College and various scattered academic posts before taking a faculty position at the University of Nebraska Omaha in 1923, where she was the head of the philosophy department from 1929 to 1946. She was paid less than half what her male counterparts were paid throughout her career in Omaha. She retired in California, where she died in 1972. In old age, Weber often wore her Phi Beta Kappa key as a necklace.

== Philosophy ==
Weber criticized John B. Watson's psychological theory of behaviorism. A biographer of Weber, Lara Handsfield of Illinois State University, has written that Weber made use of emotionality that society would accept from women of the day as a philosophical example to challenge assertions of Watson's about how the mind works, a clever yet socially acceptable means of critiquing one of the world's foremost psychologists.

== Personal life ==
Weber was a feminist who supported women's suffrage. She enjoyed bicycling and basketball.

== Works ==
- University and personality, University of Chicago Magazine, Vol. 2, January 1910
- The Function of Sympathy in Moral Knowledge dissertation at University of Chicago, 1920
- Behaviorism and Indirect Responses, The Journal of Philosophy, Psychology and Scientific Methods, Vol. 17, No. 24, 1920
- General Examinations, Educational Review, Volume 63, 1922
- Universities and first principles, Education, Vol. 60, 1939
- Significance of Whitehead's philosophy for psychology, The Personalist, Vol. 21, Issue 2, April 1940
