= Beverly Gardens Park =

Park in California, United States

Coordinates: 34°4′20″N 118°24′12″W

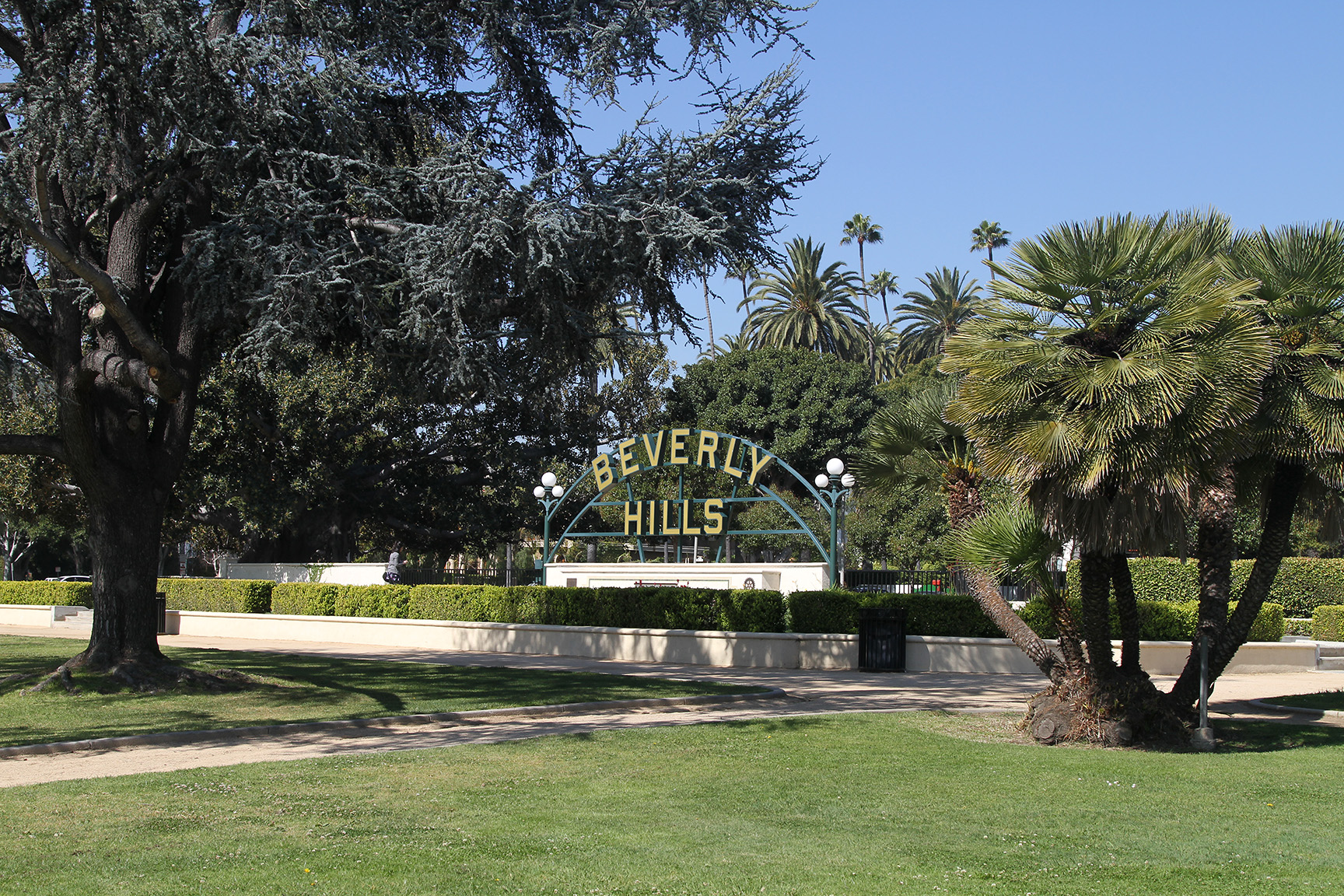
- Beverly Gardens Park and the Beverly Hills sign
- Interactive map of Beverly Gardens Park
- Location: Beverly Hills, California
- Created: 1911
- Open: All year

Beverly Gardens Park is a public park in Beverly Hills, California.

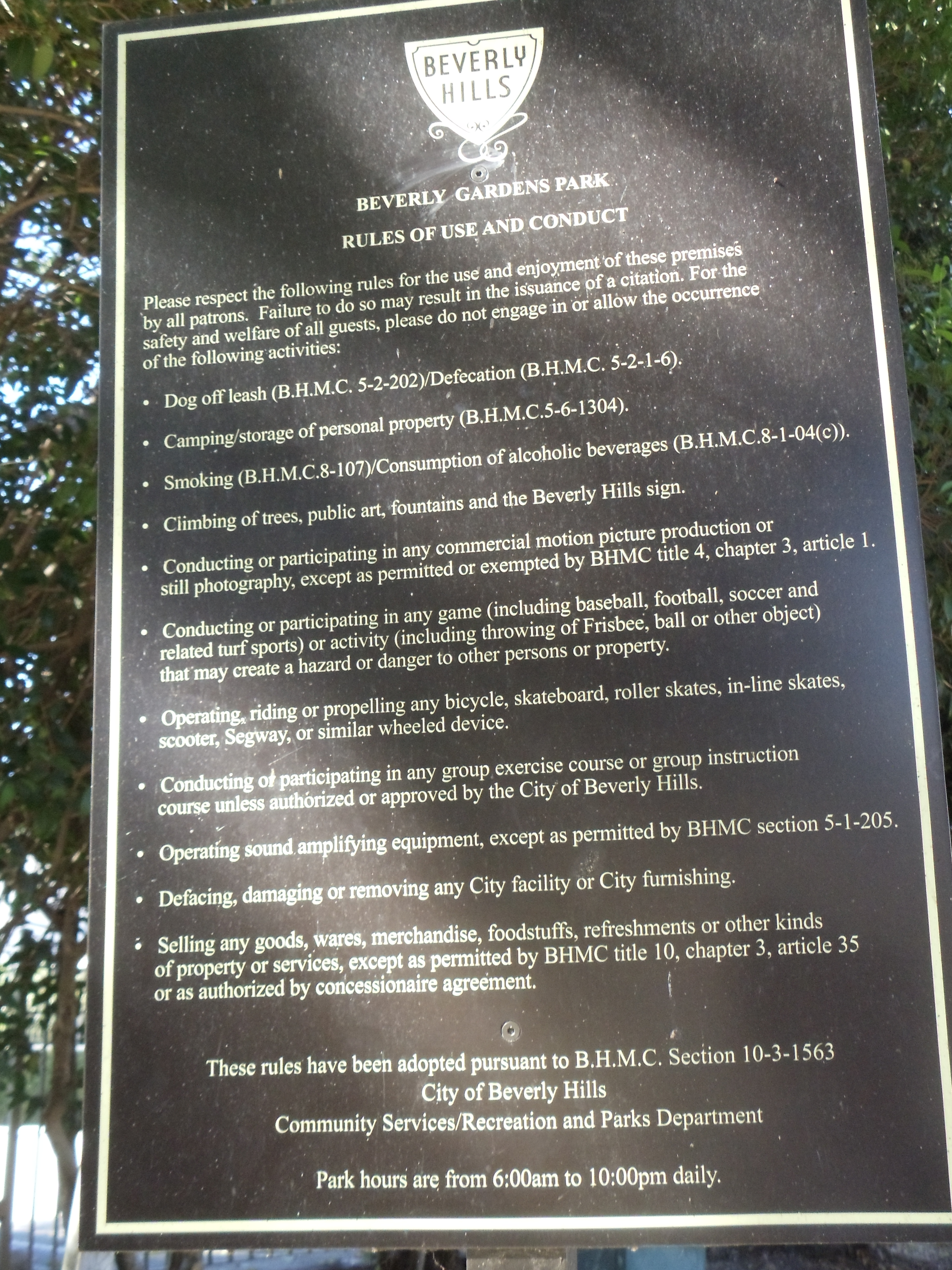
Rules of Use and Conduct sign of Beverly Gardens Park in Beverly Hills, California

== History ==
The land is built on a portion of Rancho Rodeo de las Aguas. It was opened in 1911.

== Overview ==
Beverly Gardens Park is 22 blocks long and stretches along Santa Monica Boulevard in Beverly Hills, California for 1.9 miles (3.1 km). It was designed by landscape architect Ralph D. Cornell.

The park serves to provide a lengthy green swath between the northern residential area and the commercial sections of the city. It features a two-mile jogging path, many hundred-year-old cypress and ficus trees, gardens, sculpture, and the big, iconic Beverly Hills sign, a re-creation of the original arching, lighted historic sign, built near the city's center.

The semiannual art fair, The Beverly Hills Art Show, is held on the park's central blocks, during the third weekend of every May and the third weekend of each October. Approximately 250 artists from around Los Angeles and throughout the United States are selected to display work, and up to 50,000 patrons attend throughout the weekend.

A permanent collection of Public Art includes the Electric Fountain at the far west end of the linear park, at the intersection of Santa Monica and Wilshire Boulevards. Near Rodeo Drive stands a sculpture of psychedelic tulips by Yayoi Kusama, called Hymn to Life, sculpted and produced in the art department at Ironwood by Mat McKim and Nick Petronzio. Other contemporary public art by sculptors such as Barry Flanagan, Tony Smith and Magdalena Abramovicz are installed on the garden grounds in the vicinity of Beverly Hills City Hall. Historic fountains, historic arbors, and specialty gardens devoted to roses, cacti, succulents, and palms are also visible to drivers and pedestrians along the north side of Santa Monica Boulevard, from Doheny Drive to Whittier Drive.
