= The Midnight Story =

1957 film by Joseph Pevney

- 1957 film poster by Reynold Brown
- Directed by: Joseph Pevney
- Screenplay by: John Robinson; Edwin Blum
- Story by: Edwin Blum
- Produced by: Robert Arthur
- Starring: Tony Curtis; Marisa Pavan; Gilbert Roland
- Cinematography: Russell Metty
- Edited by: Ted J. Kent
- Color process: Black and white
- Production company: Universal Pictures
- Distributed by: Universal Pictures
- Release date: June 4, 1957
- Running time: 90 minutes
- Country: United States
- Language: English

The Midnight Story is a 1957 American CinemaScope film noir crime film directed by Joseph Pevney and starring Tony Curtis, Marisa Pavan and Gilbert Roland. The film was originally slated to be titled The Eyes of Father Tomasino, after the 1955 Lux Video Theatre TV episode it was based on.

== Plot ==
Father Tomasino is stabbed to death. San Francisco traffic cop Joe Martini felt the priest was like an actual father to him. He speaks to homicide Lieutenant Kilrain about his hunch that restaurant owner Sylvio Malatesta could be involved and asks to assist with the investigation. His request is refused, so he quits the force in order to look into Malatesta on his own.

Sylvio and his family warmly welcome Joe into their home. He hides his police past from them. He falls in love with a cousin, Anna.

Something is troubling Sylvio, but the family believes he still misses a sweetheart killed in Italy during the war. He has an alibi for the night of the priest's murder, but Sergeant Gillen, who is sympathetic to Joe, gets word to him that the alibi is a fake.

In a ploy to encourage Sylvio to confide in him, Joe pretends that he is a suspect in the murder. Sylvio breaks down and admits to having killed his own sweetheart. Joe deduces the rest. The two men engage in a vicious punch-up. Sylvio subsequently runs into the street and is struck by a vehicle.

Just before he dies, he begs for Joe's forgiveness. Sylvio had confessed the murder to Father Tomasino, who insisted he go to the police. Sylvio felt he could never do this and the anguish and guilt tormented him until he snapped and killed the priest.

== Cast ==
- Tony Curtis as Joe Martini
- Marisa Pavan as Anna Malatesta
- Gilbert Roland as Sylvio Malatesta
- Jay C. Flippen as Sergeant Jack Gillen
- Argentina Brunetti as Mama Malatesta
- Ted de Corsia as Lieutenant Kilrain
- Richard Monda as "Peanuts" Malatesta
- Kathleen Freeman as Rosa Cuneo
- Herb Vigran as Charlie Cuneo (as Herburt Vigran)
- Peggy Maley as Veda Pinelli
- John Cliff as Father Giuseppe
- Russ Conway as Det. Sgt. Sommers
- Chico Vejar as Frankie Pellatrini
- Tito Vuolo as Grocer
- Helen Wallace as Mother Catherine
- James Hyland as Frank Wilkins

== Production ==
The film was shot on location in San Francisco in August 1956. At Tony Curtis's request, the shoot followed a "French" shooting schedule, whereby filming would begin at noon and run continuously until 7 p.m.

== See also ==
- List of American films of 1957
