= Beverly Hills Women's Club =

- U.S. National Register of Historic Places
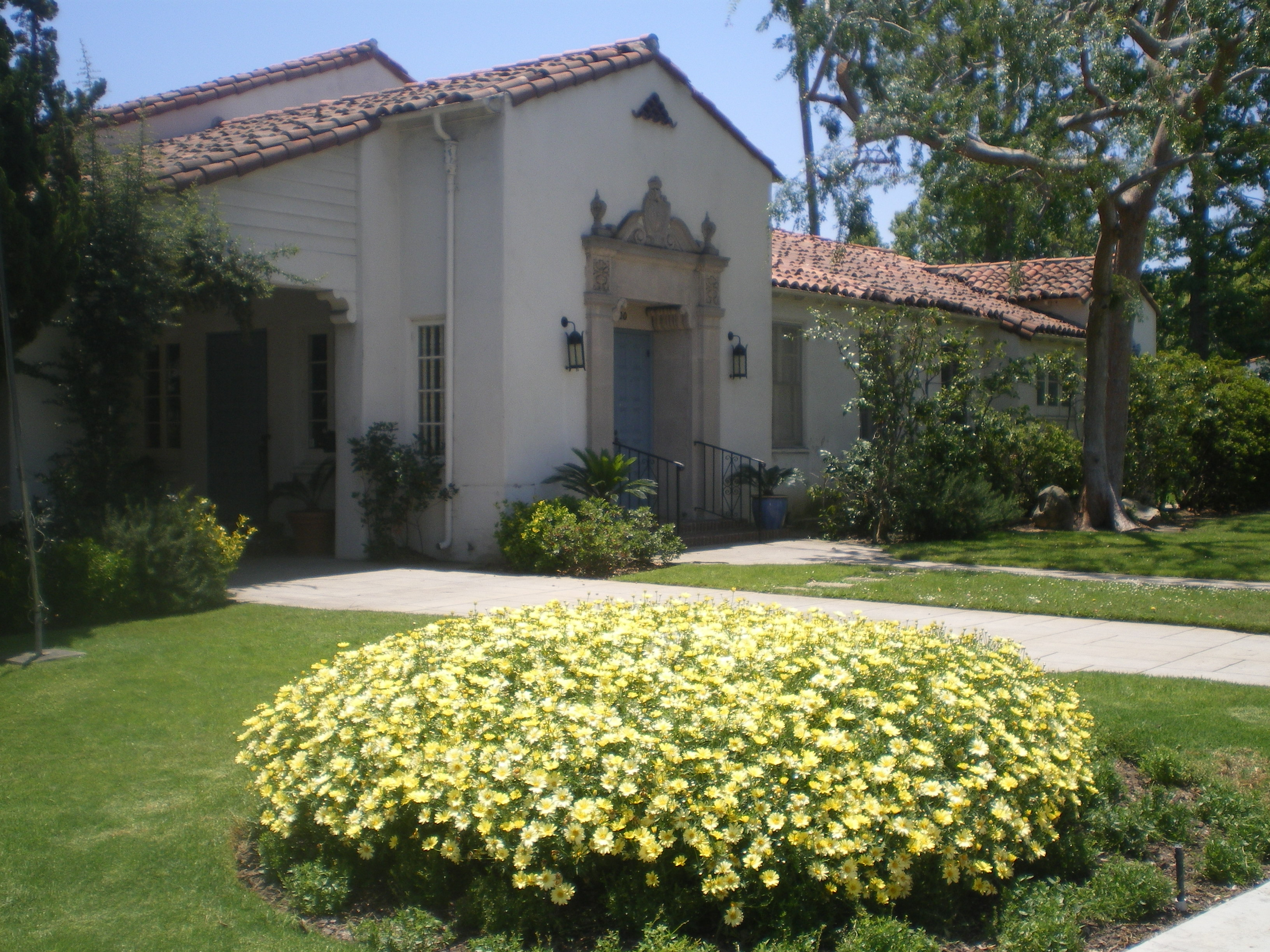

- Location within the Los Angeles metropolitan area Location within California Location within the United States
- Location: 1700 Chevy Chase Dr., Beverly Hills, California
- Coordinates: 34.08423°N 118.42161°W
- Area: less than one acre
- Built: 1925
- Architect: Gable & Wyant
- NRHP reference No.: 06000914
- Added to NRHP: October 4, 2006

The Beverly Hills Women's Club is an historic clubhouse and social club in Beverly Hills, California.

== History ==
=== Beginnings ===
The club was founded in October 1916, and it served as a unit for the American Red Cross during the First World War.

=== The clubhouse ===
In 1925, they raised US$4,000 at a horse show attended by the likes of Hobart Bosworth, Douglas Fairbanks, Mary Pickford, Stanley S. Anderson (owner of the Beverly Hills Hotel), Cecilia DeMille (daughter of Cecil B. DeMille), Charles E. Toberman, Silsby Spalding (Mayor of Beverly Hills), and Alphonzo Bell (developer of Bel Air, California). Later that year, they used that money to move into the newly constructed clubhouse. The clubhouse is a one-story, stucco-clad Spanish Colonial Revival with a tiled hip roof. It features pilasters, scrolled brackets, an entablature topped by a pediment with a shield and urn motif surrounding the main door, and casement windows. It was designed by the architectural team Gable & Wyant, who also designed Hangar One.

The clubhouse has been listed on the National Register of Historic Places listings in Los Angeles County, California since October 4, 2006.

=== The social club ===
Early members, who rode horses to make their way to the club, included Mrs Burton E. Green and actress Norma Shearer. Special guests included Amelia Earhart and Gloria Swanson. It sponsored the Will Rogers Horse Show and exhibited art such as El Greco's Saint Francis of Assisi and, in 2007, Roland Muri. In 1930, they created the Electric Fountain in Beverly Hills through efforts from Harold Lloyd's mother.

In 1963, they published a cookbook, Beverly Hills Women's Club Cook Book: Fashions in Food.

Recent guests include Stephen J. Cannell. One former president is Jill Tavelman, ex-wife of singer Phil Collins and mother of actress Lily Collins.
