= Marty (film) =

1955 American romantic drama film directed by Delbert Mann

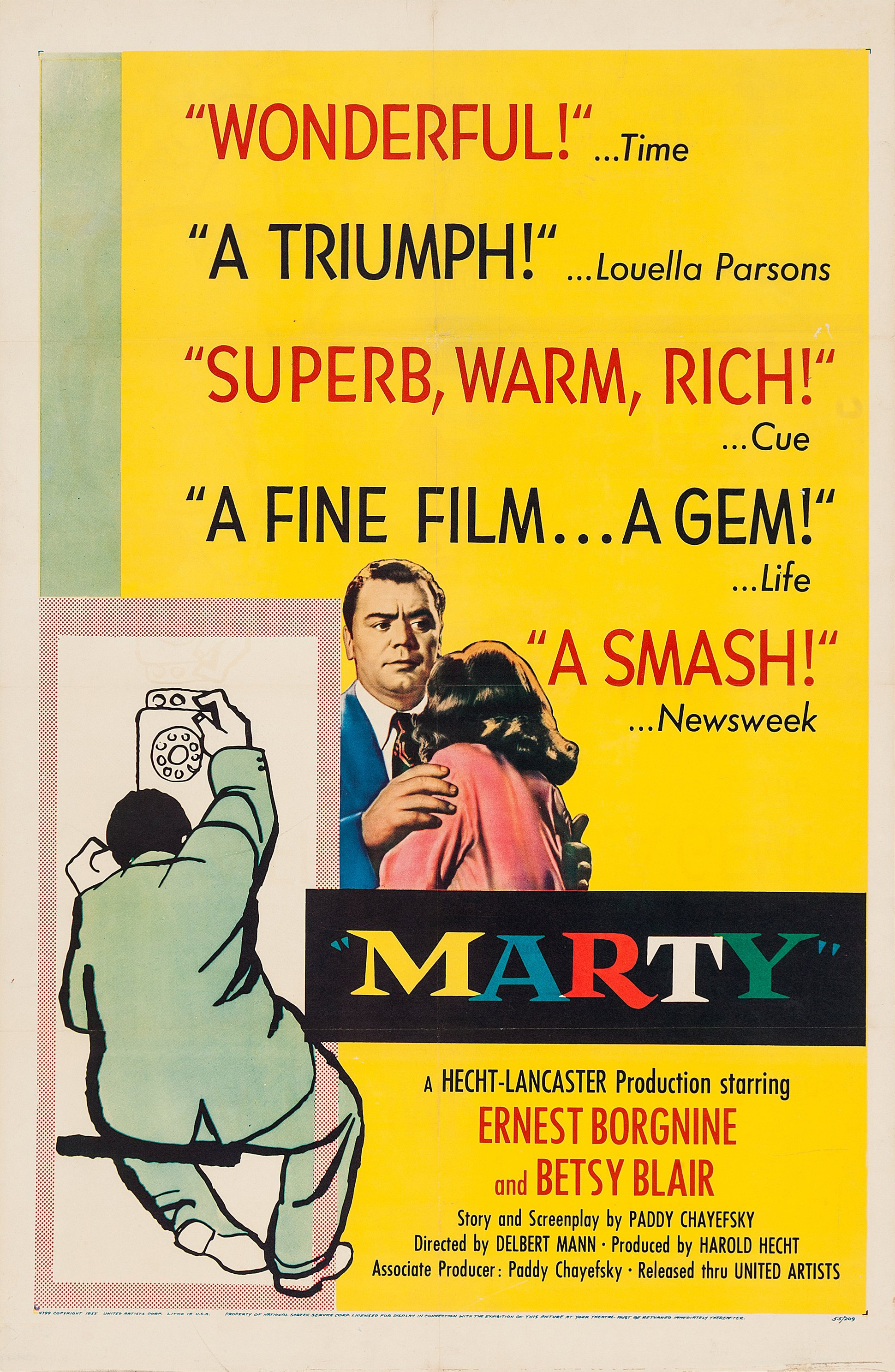
- Theatrical release poster
- Directed by: Delbert Mann
- Written by: Paddy Chayefsky
- Produced by: Harold Hecht
- Starring: Ernest Borgnine; Betsy Blair
- Cinematography: Joseph LaShelle
- Edited by: Alan Crosland, Jr. (editorial supervision)
- Music by: Roy Webb
- Production companies: Hecht-Lancaster Productions; Steven Productions
- Distributed by: United Artists
- Release date: April 11, 1955
- Running time: 93 minutes
- Country: United States
- Language: English
- Budget: $350,000
- Box office: $2,000,000 (U.S./Canada rentals) $1,500,000 (overseas rentals)

Marty is a 1955 American romantic drama film directed by Delbert Mann in his directorial debut. The screenplay was written by Paddy Chayefsky, expanding upon his 1953 teleplay, which was broadcast on The Philco-Goodyear Television Playhouse and starred Rod Steiger in the title role.

The film stars Ernest Borgnine, who won the Academy Award for Best Actor, and Betsy Blair. It won both the Academy Award for Best Picture and the Cannes Film Festival's Palme d'Or. The Lost Weekend (1945), Parasite (2019), and Anora (2024) are the only other films to win both awards.

In 1994, Marty was deemed "culturally, historically or aesthetically significant" and selected for preservation in the Library of Congress' National Film Registry.

== Plot ==
Marty Piletti is an Italian-American butcher who lives in The Bronx with his widowed mother. Unmarried at 34, the good-natured but socially awkward Marty faces constant badgering from customers, family, and friends to settle down as they point out that all of his brothers and sisters are married, most of them with children. Not averse to marriage but disheartened by his lack of prospects, Marty has reluctantly resigned himself to bachelorhood.

After being badgered by his mother into going to the Stardust Ballroom one Saturday night, Marty connects with Clara, a plain high school science teacher, who is weeping outside on the roof after her blind date abandoned her. Marty and Clara spend the evening together dancing, walking the busy streets, and talking in a diner. Marty eagerly spills out his life story and ambitions, and they encourage each other. He takes Clara to his house, where he awkwardly tries to kiss her and is rebuffed. Clara explains that she just did not know how to handle the situation; she likes Marty and wants to see him again. They kiss briefly and embrace.

Marty's mother returns, displeased to see her son with a strange woman. Marty takes Clara home by bus, promising to call her at 2:30 the next afternoon, after Mass. Overjoyed on his way back home, he punches the bus stop sign and weaves between the cars, looking for a cab instead.

Meanwhile, Marty's Aunt Catherine reluctantly moves in with Marty and his mother. Catherine privately warns her sister that Marty will soon marry and cast her aside. Fearing that Marty's new romance could spell her abandonment, his mother belittles Clara to Marty the next day before Mass.

Marty's friends, with an undercurrent of envy, deride Clara for her plainness. They try to convince Marty to forget her and remain with them, unmarried, in their fading youth. Harangued into submission by his friends, Marty fails to call Clara.

That night, back in the same lonely rut, Marty realizes that he is giving up a woman he not only likes but who makes him happy. Over his friends' objections, he dashes to a phone booth to call Clara. When his friend Ange asks what he is doing, Marty bursts out:

You don't like her, my mother don't like her, she's a dog and I'm a fat, ugly man! Well, all I know is I had a good time last night! I'm gonna have a good time tonight! If we have enough good times together, I'm gonna get down on my knees and I'm gonna beg that girl to marry me! If we make a party on New Year's, I got a date for that party. You don't like her? That's too bad!

Meanwhile, Clara sits with her family watching television, silently crying. Just before calling her, Marty needles Ange with the same words he has heard so often himself: "Hey, Ange, when are *you* gonna get married? You should be ashamed of yourself." Marty closes the phone booth door when Clara answers the phone.

In the last line of the film, Marty says, "Hello...Hello, Clara?"

== Cast ==
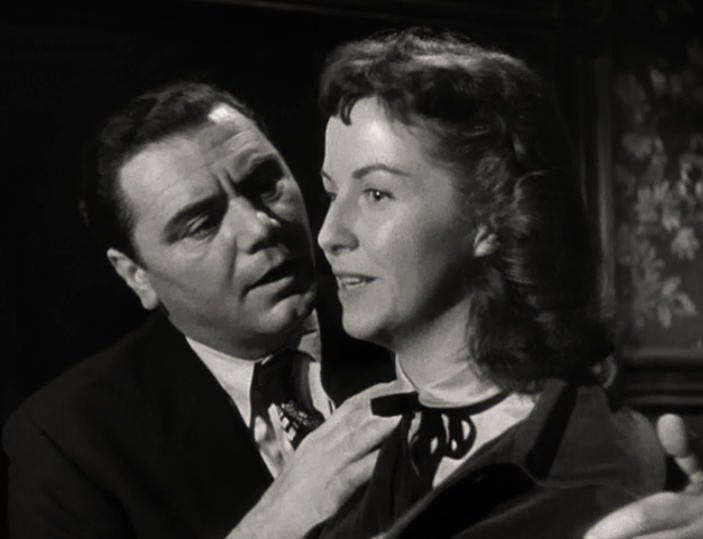
Ernest Borgnine with Betsy Blair in the trailer for Marty, 1955

- Ernest Borgnine as Marty Piletti
- Betsy Blair as Clara Snyder
- Esther Minciotti as Mrs. Teresa Piletti, Marty's mother
- Augusta Ciolli as Aunt Catherine, Mrs. Piletti's sister
- Joe Mantell as Ange, Marty's best friend
- Karen Steele as Virginia, Aunt Catherine's daughter-in-law
- Jerry Paris as Tommy, Aunt Catherine's son
- Frank Sutton as Ralph (uncredited)

== Production ==
For the film, Esther Minciotti, Augusta Ciolli and Joe Mantell reprised their roles from the live television production. The screenplay changed the name of the Waverly Ballroom to the Stardust Ballroom. The film expanded the role of Clara, and added subplots about Marty's career, his mother, and her sister.

Rod Steiger, who had played Marty in the teleplay, declined an offer to reprise the role after Harold Hecht and Burt Lancaster, the film's producers, demanded Steiger sign a multiple-picture commitment as a condition of retaining his role. Ernest Borgnine assumed the title role in Steiger's stead.

Shooting for the film began on September 7, 1954, in The Bronx and depicted many aspects of the borough, such as Grand Concourse, Arthur Avenue, Gun Hill Road, White Plains Road, and several Bronx subway and elevated train lines, including the Concourse, Third Avenue, White Plains Road, and Jerome Avenue lines. On-set filming took place at Samuel Goldwyn Studios on November 1, 1954. Bronx native Jerry Orbach made his film debut in an uncredited role as a ballroom patron. Chayefsky had an uncredited cameo as Leo.

The role of Clara initially was going to be reprised by actress Nancy Marchand, later of Lou Grant and The Sopranos fame, who had portrayed the character in the television version. However, actress Betsy Blair was interested in playing the role and lobbied for it. At the time, Blair, who was married to actor Gene Kelly, had been blacklisted due to her Marxist and Communist sympathies. Kelly used his status as a major star with Metro-Goldwyn-Mayer and his studio connections to pressure United Artists to give Blair the role. Reportedly, Kelly threatened to withdraw from the film It's Always Fair Weather if Blair did not get the role of Clara.

Mann shot the film in sixteen days and an additional three days for retakes.

Borgnine reported that the film was intended to be partially completed and written off. “That way, the producers could pay themselves a salary, yet not have to show a corporate profit.” Fortunately, “the tax man said no. In order to do that, they had to finish the picture, show it once, and then take a loss.”

== Reception ==
Upon its premiere on April 11, 1955 (followed by a wide release on July 15), Marty received overwhelmingly positive reviews from critics. Ronald Holloway of Variety wrote "If Marty is an example of the type of material that can be gleaned, then studio story editors better spend more time at home looking at television." Time described the film as "wonderful". Louella Parsons enjoyed the film, but she felt that it would not likely be nominated for Oscars. At a budget of $343,000, the film generated revenues of $3 million in the U.S., making it a box-office success.

Rotten Tomatoes gives it a 96% rating based on 77 reviews, with an average rating of 8.1/10. The site's consensus reads: "Scriptwriter Paddy Chayefsky's solid dialogue is bolstered by strong performances from Ernest Borgnine and Betsy Blair in this appealingly low-key character study."

The film is recognized by the American Film Institute.

- 2002: AFI's 100 Years ... 100 Passions – 64

== Awards and nominations ==
| Award | Category | Nominee(s) | Result | Ref. |
|---|---|---|---|---|
| Academy Awards | Best Motion Picture | Harold Hecht | Won | |
| Academy Awards | Best Director | Delbert Mann | Won | |
| Academy Awards | Best Actor | Ernest Borgnine | Won | |
| Academy Awards | Best Supporting Actor | Joe Mantell | Nominated | |
| Academy Awards | Best Supporting Actress | Betsy Blair | Nominated | |
| Academy Awards | Best Screenplay | Paddy Chayefsky | Won | |
| Academy Awards | Best Art Direction – Black-and-White | Art Direction: Ted Haworth and Walter M. Simonds; Set Decoration: Robert Priestley | Nominated | |
| Academy Awards | Best Cinematography – Black-and-White | Joseph LaShelle | Nominated | |
| Bodil Awards | Best American Film | Delbert Mann | Won | |
| British Academy Film Awards | Best Film from any Source | | Nominated | |
| British Academy Film Awards | Best Foreign Actor | Ernest Borgnine | Won | |
| British Academy Film Awards | Best Foreign Actress | Betsy Blair | Won | |
| Cannes Film Festival | Palme d'Or | Delbert Mann | Won | |
| Cannes Film Festival | OCIC Award | Delbert Mann | Won | |
| Directors Guild of America Awards | Outstanding Directorial Achievement in Motion Pictures | Delbert Mann | Won | |
| Golden Globe Awards | Best Actor in a Motion Picture – Drama | Ernest Borgnine | Won | |
| Karlovy Vary International Film Festival | Best Film | Delbert Mann | Nominated | |
| National Board of Review Awards | Top Ten Films | | Won | |
| National Board of Review Awards | Best Film | | Won | |
| National Board of Review Awards | Best Actor | Ernest Borgnine | Won | |
| National Film Preservation Board | National Film Registry | | Inducted | |
| New York Film Critics Circle Awards | Best Film | | Won | |
| New York Film Critics Circle Awards | Best Actor | Ernest Borgnine | Won | |
| Online Film & Television Association Awards | Film Hall of Fame: Productions | | Inducted | |
| Writers Guild of America Awards | Best Written American Drama | Paddy Chayefsky | Won | |

- Marty received the first Palme d'Or ever awarded. Marty, The Lost Weekend, Parasite and Anora are the only films ever to win both the Academy Award for Best Picture and the highest award at the Cannes Film Festival (Marty, Parasite and Anora received the Palme d'Or, which, beginning at the 1955 festival, replaced the Grand Prix du Festival International du Film as the highest award). Marty and Annie Hall are the shortest films ever to win Best Picture, at only 93 minutes each.

== See also ==
- List of American films of 1955
