= The Rose Tattoo (film) =

1955 American film by Daniel Mann

- Original film poster
- Directed by: Daniel Mann
- Screenplay by: Tennessee Williams
- Adaptation by: Hal Kanter
- Based on: The Rose Tattoo by Tennessee Williams
- Produced by: Hal B. Wallis
- Starring: Anna Magnani; Burt Lancaster; Marisa Pavan; Ben Cooper; Virginia Grey; Jo Van Fleet; Sandro Giglio
- Cinematography: James Wong Howe
- Edited by: Warren Low
- Music by: Alex North
- Distributed by: Paramount Pictures
- Release date: December 12, 1955 (New York City)
- Running time: 117 minutes
- Country: United States
- Languages: English; Italian
- Box office: $4.2 million (US and Canada)

The Rose Tattoo is a 1955 American film adaptation of the Tennessee Williams play of the same name. It was adapted by Williams and Hal Kanter and directed by Daniel Mann, with stars Anna Magnani, Burt Lancaster, Marisa Pavan and Jo Van Fleet. Williams originally wrote the play for Italian Anna Magnani to play on Broadway in 1951, but she declined the offer because of her difficulty with the English language at the time. By the time of this film adaptation, she was ready.

Anna Magnani won the Academy Award for Best Actress for her performance, and the film won Best Art Direction and Best Cinematography receiving five other nominations including Best Picture and Best Supporting Actress for Pavan.

== Plot ==
Serafina Delle Rose, a Sicilian seamstress, living in a community in proximity to the Gulf of Mexico, fiercely proud of and loyal to her truck-driving husband Rosario, is pregnant with their second child. Estelle asks Serafina to make a rose-colored shirt for her lover from expensive silk; Serafina does not know that the lover is Rosario and that Estelle has recently gotten a tattoo of a rose on her chest to match his.

That night, Rosario is killed in an accident while trying to evade police during a smuggling run. Serafina collapses, and the doctor informs her daughter Rosa that Serafina has miscarried.

Three years later, Serafina has become a recluse, allowing her appearance and reputation to deteriorate. She decides to attend her daughter's graduation, but two prostitutes arrive demanding that she quickly mend their bandanas for a political convention. She reluctantly does but is appalled by their talk of men and reprimands them. One of the women, Bessie, takes offense and mocks Serafina with Rosario's infidelity. Serafina is infuriated when Rosa introduces her to her new sailor boyfriend Jack Hunter. She forces him to vow before a statue of the Virgin Mary that he will respect Rosa's innocence.

Determined to find out the truth about Rosario, Serafina heads to the church to ask the priest if her husband had confessed to an affair with another woman. When he refuses to answer, she attacks him, and a truck driver named Alvaro pulls her off. He drives her home, where she offers to repair his torn shirt. She loans Alvaro the rose silk shirt that she had sewn the night of her husband's death until she is able to repair his, and they agree to meet later that night.

Alvaro returns, having impulsively gotten a rose tattooed on his chest. Serafina is disgusted and tries to throw him out, then demands that Alvaro drive her to a club her husband used to attend. Once there, she meets Estelle, who confesses and shows Serafina the rose tattooed on her chest as a symbol of her love for Rosario. Returning home, Serafina smashes the urn containing Rosario's ashes and invites Alvaro to return in the night.

Alvaro turns up hours later severely intoxicated, and Serafina leaves him in a drunken stupor and retires to bed. That night, Rosa returns home and falls asleep on the sofa; Alvaro mistakes her for Serafina and tries to kiss her. Rosa screams, and Serafina gets rid of Alvaro.

The following morning, Serafina finds Alvaro on top of a boat mast outside her house begging for forgiveness. Jack arrives and asks Serafina if he can marry Rosa. She gives her consent, and they leave to be married. Serafina then calls Alvaro down from the boat mast before declaring in front of her neighbors that they have to pick up from where they left off the night before. They enter her house and shut the door. A lively tune is heard on Serafina's player piano, along with the sounds of their partying and laughter.

== Cast ==
- Anna Magnani as Serafina Delle Rose
- Burt Lancaster as Alvaro Mangiacavallo
- Marisa Pavan as Rosa Delle Rose
- Ben Cooper as Seaman Jack Hunter
- Virginia Grey as Estelle Hohengarten
- Jo Van Fleet as Bessie
- Sandro Giglio as Father De Leo
- Mimi Aguglia as Assunta
- Florence Sundstrom as Flora
- Jeanne Hart as Violetta

== Production and release ==
The play was successful on Broadway and Hal Wallis bought the film rights. He wrote in his memoirs that he saw it on its opening night and "knew at once that I had to buy it. It was sure to be a great success. Audiences would identify with its earthiness, its sexuality, its deeply felt emotions and naturalistic dialogue."

Tennessee Williams insisted Magnani be given the female lead and Wallis agreed, feeling Maureen Stapleton was "too young and too American." Burt Lancaster was cast under an old agreement he had with Wallis.

Much of the film was shot on location in Key West, Florida, although the setting is not specifically mentioned in the film. The house featured in the film stands to this day and is known, appropriately, as the "Rose Tattoo House".

The house was given Italian furniture and objects, as well as wallpaper not characteristic of houses in Key West at the time.

== Release ==
The premiere of the film was held in New York City at the Astor Theatre on December 12, 1955, with Arthur Miller, Marlon Brando, Marilyn Monroe and Jayne Mansfield among the celebrities in attendance.

Variety called it "an offbeat 'A' that must be sold hard."

The movie was very successful commercially.

Wallis and Magnani later collaborated on Wild Is the Wind (1957) but it was not as successful—albeit earning her a second Oscar nomination for Best Actress.

== Awards and nominations ==
Award	Category	Nominee(s)	Result	Ref.
Academy Awards	Best Motion Picture	Hal B. Wallis	Nominated	
Academy Awards	Best Actress	Anna Magnani	Won	
Academy Awards	Best Supporting Actress	Marisa Pavan	Nominated	
Academy Awards	Best Art Direction – Black-and-White	Art Direction: Hal Pereira and Tambi Larsen; Set Decoration: Samuel M. Comer and Arthur Krams	Won	
Academy Awards	Best Cinematography – Black-and-White	James Wong Howe	Won	
Academy Awards	Best Costume Design – Black-and-White	Edith Head	Nominated	
Academy Awards	Best Film Editing	Warren Low	Nominated	
Academy Awards	Best Scoring of a Dramatic or Comedy Picture	Alex North	Nominated	
British Academy Film Awards	Best Foreign Actress	Anna Magnani	Won	
British Academy Film Awards	Best Foreign Actress	Marisa Pavan	Nominated	
Directors Guild of America Awards	Outstanding Directorial Achievement in Motion Pictures	Daniel Mann	Nominated	
Golden Globe Awards	Best Actress in a Motion Picture – Drama	Anna Magnani	Won	
Golden Globe Awards	Best Supporting Actress – Motion Picture	Marisa Pavan	Won	
Golden Goblet Awards	Special Mention	Anna Magnani	Won	
National Board of Review Awards	Top Ten Films		6th Place	
National Board of Review Awards	Best Actress	Anna Magnani	Won	
New York Film Critics Circle Awards	Best Actress	Anna Magnani	Won	

== Notes ==
- Wallis, Hal B.; Higham, Charles (1980). Starmaker : the autobiography of Hal Wallis.
