= Robert Merrell Gage =

American sculptor

- Born: December 26, 1892; Topeka, Kansas, United States
- Died: October 30, 1981 (aged 88)
- Other name: Merrell Gage
- Education: Washburn University
- Occupation: sculptor
- Known for: professor and head of sculpture at USC
- Notable work: statue of Abraham Lincoln on the grounds of the Kansas State Capitol
- Spouse: Marian Gage
- Awards: Academy Award for Best Live Action Short Film, The Face of Lincoln (1955)

Robert Merrell Gage (December 26, 1892 – October 30, 1981) was an American sculptor, frequently credited and better known as Merrell Gage.

== Biography ==
Gage was born in Topeka, Kansas and studied in the Topeka public schools and at Washburn University. He worked on ranches in the Midwest before settling on an art career. He studied art in New York and France and worked in the studio of Gutzon Borglum as an assistant. In 1916, he set up a sculpture studio in a barn behind his house in Topeka. His first public commission was for a statue of Abraham Lincoln that is now on the grounds of the Kansas State Capitol.

He married Marian Gage, a painter, shortly after World War I when he was in the medical corps and lived in Kansas City. He began teaching sculpture at Washburn and at the Kansas City Art Institute. They moved to Los Angeles from New York in 1924 and built a studio in their home in the Santa Monica Canyon. He was appointed professor of sculpture at the University of Southern California and rose to the head of the department. Gage's mother and sister lived in La Jolla, San Diego, California. His work was also part of the sculpture event in the art competition at the 1932 Summer Olympics.

== Academy Award Winning Short Film ==
Gage executed likenesses of Lincoln in many stages of the president's life. In 1955 Gage starred in a short film The Face of Lincoln, in which he modeled Lincoln's features while narrating the story of his life. The film, produced by Wilber T. Blume, won an Academy Award for Best Live Action Short Film. Gage executed numerous commissions in the Los Angeles area and served on the sculpture commission for the 1936 Olympics. His film The Face of Jesus was nominated for Academy Awards in 1962.

== Works ==
- seated Lincoln, Kansas State Capitol grounds, Topeka, Kansas (circa 1915)
- American Legion Memorial, Kansas City, Missouri (1921)
- Police Monument, Kansas City, Missouri ( 1921)
- Electric Fountain, Beverly Hills, California (1931)
- the Edison Building, Los Angeles, California, (1931)
- Facade of the Los Angeles Times Building, Los Angeles, California (1935)
- Pioneer Mother Memorial, Kansas State Capitol grounds, Topeka, Kansas (1937)
- Allan J. Hancock Foundation, University of Southern California, Los Angeles, California, (1940)
- Bust of Sherman Minton, Indiana Statehouse, Indianapolis, Indiana (1956)
- Bust of Abraham Lincoln, 110 Grand Avenue, Los Angeles, California (1961)
- many schools and churches
