= The Face of Lincoln =

1955 film

- Directed by: Edward Freed
- Produced by: Wilbur T. Blume
- Starring: Merrell Gage
- Production company: University of Southern California
- Distributed by: Universal Pictures
- Release date: 1955
- Running time: 20 minutes
- Country: United States
- Language: English

The Face of Lincoln is a 1955 short documentary film in which sculptor Robert Merrell Gage models the features of Abraham Lincoln while narrating the story of Lincoln's life. It won an Oscar at the 28th Academy Awards in 1956 for Best Short Subject (Two-Reel) and was also nominated for Documentary Short Subject. The film was directed by Edward Freed and produced by USC School of Cinematic Arts instructor Wilbur T. Blume.
