= Electric Fountain =

Public art

Coordinates: 34.06707°N 118.410419°W

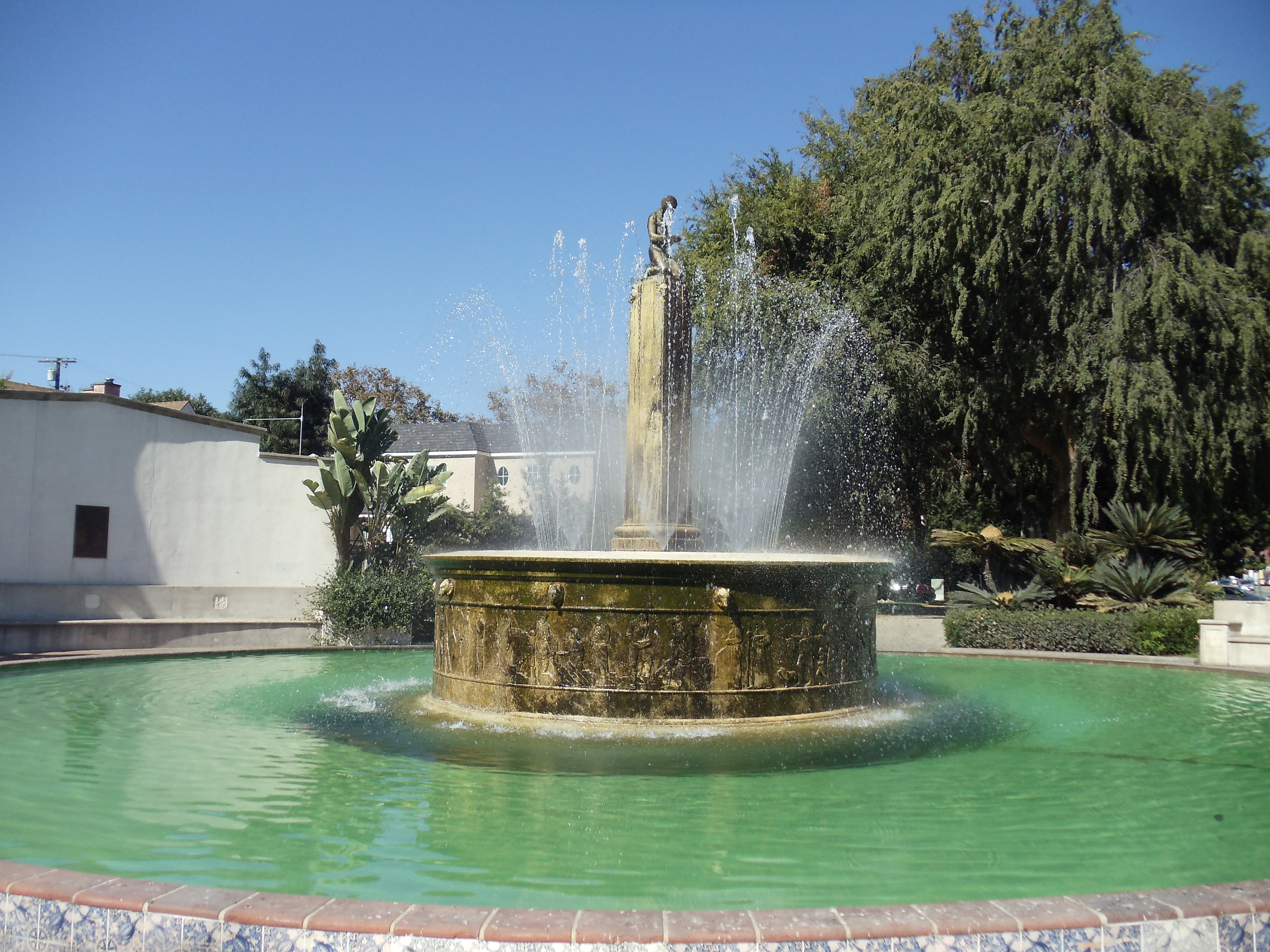
Electric Fountain in Beverly Hills, California

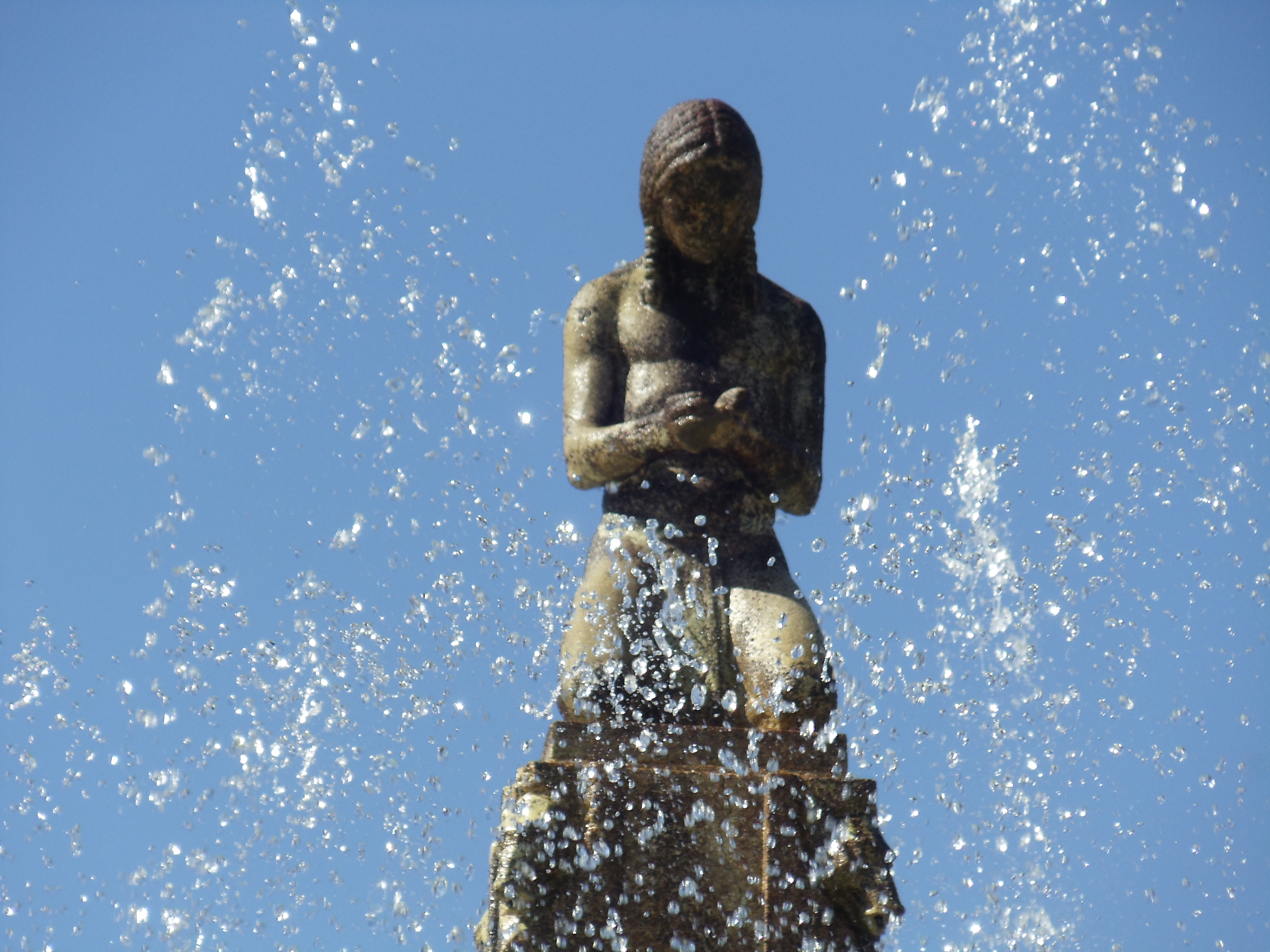
Sculpture at the top of the Electric Fountain in Beverly Hills, California

The Electric Fountain is a water fountain with public art sculptures and evening lighting, surrounded by mosaic pavement, seating, and landscaping. It is located in Beverly Gardens Park on the corner of Santa Monica and Wilshire Boulevards in Beverly Hills, California.

== The fountain ==
The two-level circular fountain includes a circular raised fountain spray area surrounded by a 30-foot (9.1 m) diameter pool. It was designed by architect Ralph Carlin Flewelling in 1931, in partnership with sculptor Robert Merrell Gage, who created the center sculpture and bas relief.

== Public art components ==
The Electric Fountain contains several individual public art components. These components include sculpture, bas relief, mosaics, landscaping, and lighting program.

=== Sculpture ===
Robert Merrell Gage placed the 6-foot (1.8 m) granite sculpture of a Tongva/Gabrieleno tribe member, kneeling in prayer, on a 20-foot (6.1 m) stone column. According to Peter James Holliday, the image was "said to be modeled after Gradin Newsom, who was part Cherokee". The sculpture sits in the center of the smaller circular raised fountain.

=== Bas relief ===
The sides of the circular raised stone fountain are carved with 3-foot (0.91 m) high bas relief sculptures by Robert Merrell Gage as a companion piece to the Tongva/Gabrieleno tribe member sculpture. The bas relief images depict scenes of the area's early history and development.

=== Ceramic tile and mosaic pavement ===
The surrounding 30 foot (9.1 m) diameter pool is edged with ceramic tile. Terra cotta mosaic pavement tiles show images from the early history of the area and the founding of the city.

=== Landscaping and lighting program ===
Landscaping and benches surround the pool and have been modified throughout the decades. The most recent addition to the Electric Fountain was the multi-colored nighttime lighting program for the pool, fountain, and sculpture. Installed in 2016, the lighting program made the Electric Fountain highly visible after dark.

== History ==
The fountain was a gift to the City of Beverly Hills from Sarah Elizabeth (Fraser) Lloyd, mother of silent-screen actor Harold Lloyd in 1931, and the original installation was funded by the Beverly Hills Women's Club. It was built on land donated by the Rodeo Land and Water Company.

In 2014-2015, Chinese businessman Wang Jianlin donated US$200,000 for the restoration of the fountain, and in 2016 the fountain, sculptures, and surrounding public space received a major restoration and renovation.

It was featured in the 1995 movie Clueless and The Go-Go's 1981 music video for "Our Lips Are Sealed".

== See also ==
- Beverly Hills - 20th Century
