= Ralph D. Cornell =

American landscape architect

- Born: January 11, 1890; Holdrege, Nebraska, U.S.
- Died: April 6, 1972 (aged 82); Los Angeles, California, U.S.
- Education: Pomona College; Harvard University
- Occupation: Landscape architect

Ralph Dalton Cornell (January 11, 1890 – April 6, 1972) was an American landscape architect based in Los Angeles, California. He is best known for his long-term impact on the landscapes of Pomona College, University of Hawaii Honolulu, and the University of California Los Angeles as well as his early use of native California plants.

== Biography ==
=== Early life ===
Ralph Dalton Cornell was born on January 11, 1890, in Holdrege, Nebraska. He moved to Long Beach, California with his family in 1908. He graduated from Pomona College in 1914 and received an M.L.A. from Harvard University in 1917. During World War I, he served in the United States Army.

=== Career ===
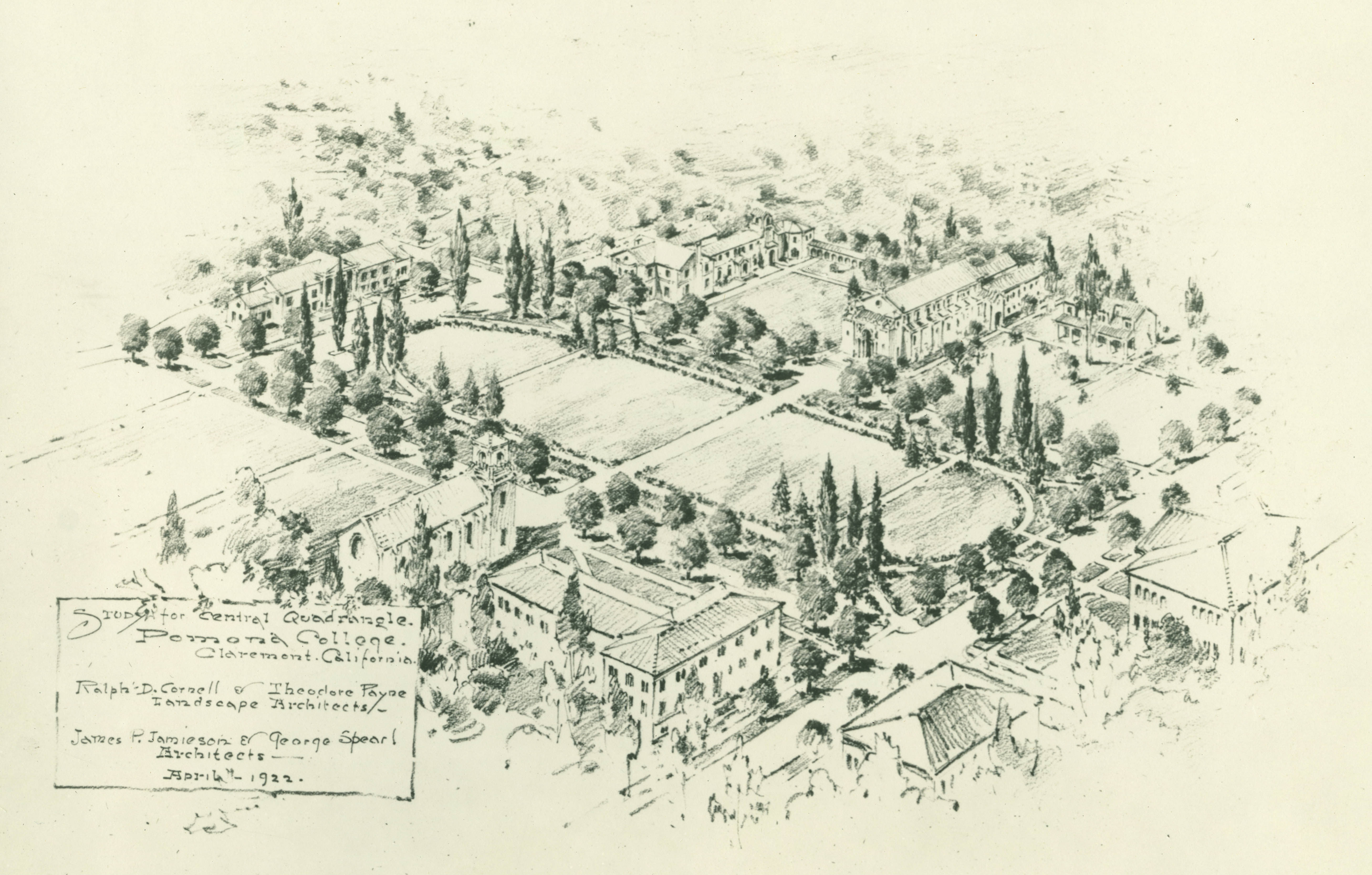
Cornell's 1922 study for the design of Marston Quadrangle at his alma mater, Pomona College

In 1919, he established a practice as a landscape architect in Los Angeles, California. Pomona College hired Cornell as its supervising landscape architect, which he continued throughout his career. His first major job In 1922, he designed the master plan for Torrey Pines State Natural Reserve in La Jolla with Theodore Payne. His design avoided alterations to the original landscape and the introduction of non-native plants, resulting in a protecting a unique microclimate. In 1928, the University of Hawaii in Honolulu hired Cornell as its supervising landscape architect.

In the 1930s, Avis and Llewellyn Bixby had hired Cornell to plan the landscape as part of a larger project to rehabilitate the 1840s adobe at the Rancho Los Cerritos in Long Beach. Cornell created an informal front yard with a lawn surrounded by mature trees, landscaped the inner courtyard with a pond, and added a native garden and a fruit orchard along with driveways and walkways. In 1937, the University of California Los Angeles hired Cornell as its supervising landscape architect, the third of his long-term collegiate projects, which resulted in awards for the Franklin D. Murphy Sculpture Garden and the Sunset Canyon Recreation Center.

He also designed the Hillside Memorial Park Cemetery, the grounds of the Civic Center and the La Brea Tar Pits in Los Angeles, the Beverly Gardens Park in Beverly Hills, and the Glen Haven Memorial Park in Sylmar.

He was a trustee and Fellow of the American Society of Landscape Architects.

=== Death ===
He died on April 6, 1972.
