= Marisa Pavan =

Italian and French actress (1932–2023)

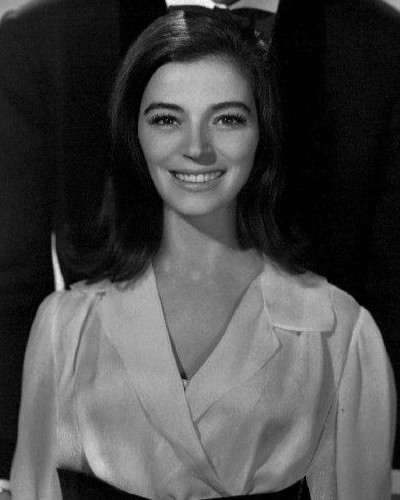
- Pavan in 1965
- Born: Maria Luisa Pierangeli; 19 June 1932; Cagliari, Sardinia, Kingdom of Italy
- Died: 6 December 2023 (aged 91); Gassin, Var, France
- Occupation: Actress
- Years active: 1952–1992
- Spouse: Jean-Pierre Aumont (m. 1956; died 2001)
- Children: 2
- Relatives: Pier Angeli (sister)

Maria Luisa Pierangeli (19 June 1932 – 6 December 2023), known professionally as Marisa Pavan, was an Italian and French actress who first became known as the twin sister of film star Pier Angeli (Anna Maria Pierangeli) before achieving success in her screen career. She received an Academy Award nomination and won a Golden Globe Award for her performance in the 1955 film The Rose Tattoo.

== Early life and career ==
Pavan and her fraternal twin sister, Anna Maria, were born in 1932 in Cagliari, Sardinia, the children of Enrichetta (née Romiti) and Luigi Pierangeli, a construction engineer, both from Pesaro, Marche. The two girls also had a younger sister, Patrizia Pierangeli, who became an actress as well. Her stage name, Pavan, was the surname of a Jewish general in the Italian Army she and her family hid during the Nazi occupation of Rome in World War II.

Pavan had no dramatic training when she signed a Hollywood contract with Paramount at age 19. Although her screen debut was in 1952 in What Price Glory, Pavan's breakthrough role came three years later, when she was cast as Anna Magnani's daughter in The Rose Tattoo. That part was initially assigned to her twin sister, but by the time production began, Angeli was unavailable for the role. Pavan's performance earned an Oscar nomination for Best Supporting Actress. She also won the Golden Globe Award for (Best Supporting Actress) for her performance in the film.

Pavan co-starred in films such as Diane (1956), The Man in the Gray Flannel Suit (1956), The Midnight Story (1957) and John Paul Jones (1959). She also played Abishag in King Vidor's biblical epic Solomon and Sheba (1959). Her later films included A Slightly Pregnant Man (1973), Antoine and Sebastian (1974) and the television miniseries The Moneychangers (1976). In 1985, she played Chantal Dubujak on Ryan's Hope.

== Personal life and death ==
On 27 March 1956, Pavan married French actor Jean-Pierre Aumont in Santa Barbara, California, and the couple remained together until Aumont's death in 2001. They had two sons.

Pavan died at her home in Gassin, France on 6 December 2023, aged 91.

== Selected filmography ==
- What Price Glory (1952)
- I Chose Love (1953)
- Down Three Dark Streets (1954)
- Drum Beat (1954)
- The Rose Tattoo (1955)
- Alfred Hitchcock Presents (1956) (Season 1 Episode 16: "You Got to Have Luck") as Mary Schaffner
- Diane (1956)
- The Man in the Gray Flannel Suit (1956)
- The Midnight Story (1957)
- John Paul Jones (1959)
- Solomon and Sheba (1959)
- Shangri-La (TV movie, 1960)
- Naked City – "Requiem for a Sunday Afternoon" as Josephine (1961)
- Combat! – Season 2 Episode 12 "Ambush" as Marie Marchand (1963)
- The F.B.I. – Season 1 Episode 9 "The Exiles" as Maria Blanca (1965)
- The Diary of Anne Frank (TV movie, 1967)
- Cutter's Trail (TV movie) (1970)
- A Slightly Pregnant Man (1973)
- Antoine and Sebastian (1974)
- Hawaii Five-O (TV, 1977) "East Wind, Ill Wind" – Madame Sandanarik
- The Trial of Lee Harvey Oswald (TV movie, 1977)
- Wonder Woman "Formula 407" (TV, 1977)
- The Rockford Files "With the French Heel Back, Can the Nehru Jacket Be Far Behind" (TV, 1979)
