= Pacific Philosophical Quarterly =

- Discipline: Philosophy
- Language: English
- Edited by: Collis Tahzib, Gabriel Uzquiano

Publication details
- Former name: The Personalist
- History: 1920–present
- Publisher: Wiley-Blackwell on behalf of the School of Philosophy at the University of Southern California (United States)
- Frequency: Quarterly

Standard abbreviations
- ISO 4: Pac. Philos. Q.

Indexing
- CODEN: PPHQEJ
- ISSN: 0279-0750 (print); 1468-0114 (web)
- LCCN: 83641258
- OCLC no.: 06272734

Links
- Journal homepage; Online access; Online archive

The Pacific Philosophical Quarterly is a quarterly peer-reviewed academic journal of philosophy published by Wiley-Blackwell on behalf of the School of Philosophy (University of Southern California) and is edited by Collis Tahzib and Gabriel Uzquiano. The journal covers all major areas of philosophy in the analytic tradition, sometimes as special issues aimed at a particular topic.

== History ==
The journal was established in 1920 as The Personalist by Ralph Tyler Flewelling and focused on the philosophy of personalism. It obtained its current name in 1980 and "devoted itself exclusively to analytical and logical philosophy".
