= Ralph Carlin Flewelling =

American architect

- Born: May 4, 1894; St. Louis, Michigan, U.S.
- Died: December 30, 1975 (aged 81); Los Angeles County, California, U.S.
- Education: Wesleyan University; Massachusetts Institute of Technology
- Occupation: Architect
- Children: Ralph Hunter Flewelling born 1930
- Parent: Ralph Tyler Flewelling

Ralph Carlin Flewelling FAIA (May 4, 1894 – December 30, 1975) was an American architect. He designed many buildings in Los Angeles County, California.

== Early life ==
Flewelling was born on May 4, 1894, in St. Louis, Michigan. His father was Ralph Tyler Flewelling. He graduated from Wesleyan University in Middletown, Connecticut and he received a Master's degree from the Massachusetts Institute of Technology in Cambridge, Massachusetts in 1917.

== Career ==
Flewelling started his career as a draftsman for Henry M. Patterson, a Los Angeles-based architect, from 1921 to 1923. He then worked for William Lee Woollett (1874-1955) from 1924 to 1925. He opened his own architectural practise in 1925.

Flewelling designed the Hawthorne School in Beverly Hills, California in 1928. He designed the Electric Fountain in Beverly Hills in 1931. He also designed the Beverly Hills Post Office in 1932 and 1933. Later, he designed the city hall and police station in Newport Beach, California in 1949. He also designed the All Saints' Episcopal Church in Riverside, California.

Flewelling became a Fellow of the American Institute of Architects in 1941.

=== With Walter Leland Moody ===
Together with Walter Leland Moody, Flewelling designed Santa Ana College located at 1530 West 17th Street in Santa Ana, California in 1947. Two years later, in 1949, they designed Paradise Canyon Elementary School located at 471 Knight Way in La Canada, California.

They designed Morningside High School located at 10500 Yukon Avenue in Inglewood, California in 1953. The following year, in 1954, they designed the Center Street School located at 700 Center Street in El Segundo, California. That year, they also designed the Del Norte School in West Covina, California. A year later, in 1955, they designed the Hawthorne High School in Hawthorne, California.

They designed the Seeley W. Mudd Library located at 640 North College Avenue in Claremont, California in 1970; it is named for Seeley W. Mudd.

== Personal life and death ==
Flewelling married twice, first in 1925 and then in 1951. He had a child in 1930. He died on December 30, 1975, in Los Angeles County, California.
