= Watson Jones =

American sound engineer

- Occupation: Sound engineer
- Years active: 1955

Watson Jones was an American sound engineer. He was nominated for an Academy Award in the category Best Sound Recording for the film Not as a Stranger.

== Selected filmography ==
- Not as a Stranger (1955)
