= Bust of Matthew E. Welsh =

Public artwork by Daniel Edwards

Matthew E. Welsh
- Artist: Daniel Edwards
- Year: 1996
- Type: Bronze portrait bust on wooden base
- Dimensions: 60 cm × 32.4 cm × 30 cm (23.5 in × 12.75 in × 12 in)
- Location: Indiana State House; Indianapolis; 39°46′7.5″N 86°9′45.5″W
- Owner: State of Indiana

Matthew E. Welsh is a public artwork by American artist Daniel Edwards. It is located on the third floor of the Indiana State House, which is in Indianapolis, Indiana, United States. The bronze bust depicts Matthew E. Welsh, the 41st governor of Indiana (1961–1965). The bust measures 23.5 x 12.75 x 12 inches and has a wooden base which measures 4 x 14.75 x 10.5 inches. In 1996, one year after Welsh's death, the Indianapolis law firm of Bingham, Summers, Welsh & Spilman commissioned artist Daniel Edwards to sculpt the bust of Welsh. The bust was dedicated in a ceremony at the Indiana Statehouse on December 20, 1996.

== Description ==
The Matthew E. Welsh bust is a bronze, life-sized portrait sculpture of Welsh's head, neck, shoulders, and bare collarbone. Welsh's head is turned to the proper right, and he is gazing to the right. The bust is attached to a bronze base that lists Welsh's name in large block letters. The entire sculpture rests on a wooden base.

The bust is 23.5 inches tall, 12.75 inches wide, and 12 inches long. Its wooden base measures 4 inches tall, 14.75 inches wide, and 10.5 inches long. The bust is located in a limestone alcove on the third floor of the Indiana Statehouse, near the Senate Chambers. A black plaque is attached to the limestone under the bust. The plaque reads as follows: "Matthew E. Welsh/ 1912-1995/ Indiana State Representative/ 1940-1943/ Lieutenant U.S. Navy/ 1943-1946/ United States Attorney/ 1950-1952/ Indiana State Senator/ 1954-1960/ 41st Governor of Indiana/ 1961-1965". At the bottom of the plaque is the inscription, "The Law Firm of Bingham, Summers, Welsh & Spilman celebrates the life of one of Indiana's most distinguished public servants." The bust does not contain a foundry mark, nor does it contain the signature of the artist. The bust is in very good condition, according to a condition report done by the Indiana State Museum.

Daniel Edwards created the bust by first sculpting a clay model. A foundry then made a mold, which it used to cast the final bronze version of the bust.

== Historical information ==
Matthew E. Welsh (1912–1995) was the 41st governor of Indiana. Prior to becoming governor, Welsh served in the Indiana House of Representatives, the U.S. Navy, as U.S. Attorney, and in the Indiana State Senate. Welsh was elected governor of Indiana in 1960 and held the office until 1965. During his time in office, he implemented the state's first sales tax. Welsh was also a civil rights advocate, and signed a 1963 civil rights bill. Welsh ran for governor a second time in 1972, but lost to Otis R. Bowen; he then returned to his law practice. Welsh lived by the motto, "It never costs you to be a gentleman."

The bust of Matthew E. Welsh was commissioned by Welsh's law firm, Bingham, Summers, Welsh & Spilman. The law firm commissioned the bust in 1996, one year after Welsh's death (in 1995, at the age of 82). D. William Moreau, a partner in the firm, stated, "He [Welsh] was instrumental in the growth of our firm....We wanted to try to establish a permanent memorial to him" (qtd. in). In early 1996, the firm commissioned sculptor Daniel Edwards to create the bust. Edwards, a native of Indiana (he was born in La Porte, Indiana in 1965), also sculpted the Workers' Memorial Sculpture at the Indiana Government Center.

=== Acquisition ===
Bingham, Summers, Welsh & Spilman, the law firm that commissioned the bust, wanted it placed in the Indiana Statehouse. Obtaining permission to do so required working with multiple government officials, including the Senate President Pro Tempore, the House Minority Leader, the House Speaker, the Governor, and the Commissioner of the Indiana Department of Administration. The bust was finally dedicated on December 20, 1996, in a ceremony on the third floor of the Indiana Statehouse. Speakers at the ceremony included then-governor Evan Bayh, as well as Welsh's Lieutenant Governor, Richard Ristine, and Welsh's granddaughter, Kathryn Clendenin. Other attendees included Vincennes, Indiana Mayor Howard Hatcher and his legislative liaison, Matthew Hopper. (Welsh had lived much of his life in Vincennes.) Of the dedication, Hatcher stated, "It was very warming to see this bronze bust." (qtd. in) The bust remains on the third floor of the Indiana Statehouse, near the Senate Chambers.
