= Walter M. Simonds =

American art director

- Born: January 31, 1911
- Died: December 11, 1992 (aged 81)
- Occupation: Art director
- Years active: 1955-1976

Walter M. Simonds (January 31, 1911 - December 11, 1992) was an American art director. He was nominated for an Academy Award in the category Best Art Direction for the film Marty.

== Selected filmography ==
- Marty (1955)
