= Ralph Tyler Flewelling =

American philosopher

- Born: November 23, 1871; Michigan, US
- Died: March 31, 1960 (aged 88); Glendale, California, US
- Spouse: Jennie Carlin (m. 1893)
- Children: Ralph Carlin Flewelling

Ecclesiastical career
- Church: Methodist Episcopal Church
- Ordained: 1896

Academic background
- Education: Alma College; Boston University
- Doctoral advisor: Borden Parker Bowne

Academic work
- Discipline: Philosophy
- School or tradition: Personalism
- Institutions: University of Southern California

Ralph Tyler Flewelling (1871–1960) was an American philosopher.

== Biography ==
=== Early life ===
He was born on November 23, 1871, near De Witt, Michigan, and educated at the University of Michigan, Alma College (Mich.). the Garrett Biblical Institute (Evanston, Ill.), and Boston University.

=== Career ===
He was ordained in the Methodist Episcopal ministry in 1896, holding pastorates from 1903 to 1917, and in the latter year becoming professor and head of the department of philosophy in the University of Southern California. In 1918 he was at the Sorbonne, Paris, and was appointed head of the department of philosophy at the American Expeditionary Force University at Beaune, France.

He wrote four books. He also contributed to the Hastings Encyclopœdia of Religion and Ethics (1917), and founded and edited The Personalist (1920). In 1919–1920 he was president of the Celtic Club.

He died on March 31, 1960, in Glendale, California.

== Bibliography ==
- Christ and the Dramas of Doubt (1913)
- Personalism and the Problems of Philosophy (1915)
- Philosophy and the War (1918)
- Bergson and Personal Realism (1919)
- The Survival of Western Culture (1942)
