= Not as a Stranger =

1955 film by Stanley Kramer

- Theatrical release poster
- Directed by: Stanley Kramer
- Screenplay by: Edna Anhalt; Edward Anhalt
- Based on: Not as a Stranger; 1954 novel by Morton Thompson
- Produced by: Stanley Kramer
- Starring: Olivia de Havilland; Robert Mitchum; Frank Sinatra; Gloria Grahame; Broderick Crawford; Lee Marvin
- Cinematography: Franz Planer
- Edited by: Frederic Knudtson
- Music by: George Antheil
- Color process: Black and white
- Production company: Stanley Kramer Productions
- Distributed by: United Artists
- Release date: June 28, 1955
- Running time: 135 minutes
- Country: United States
- Language: English
- Budget: $1.5 million
- Box office: $6.2 million (US and Canada rentals)

Not as a Stranger is a 1955 American film noir drama film produced and directed by Stanley Kramer, starring Olivia de Havilland, Robert Mitchum, Frank Sinatra and Gloria Grahame. It is based on the 1954 novel of the same name by Morton Thompson, which topped that year's list of bestselling novels in the United States. The film's supporting cast features Broderick Crawford, Charles Bickford, Lon Chaney Jr., Lee Marvin, Harry Morgan and Mae Clarke.

== Plot ==
Lucas Marsh is a brilliant and dedicated medical student who has aspired to be a doctor since childhood. His mother is dead and he is estranged from his alcoholic father, who has squandered the family's money, leaving Lucas unable to pay for medical school. In order to get the needed tuition money, Lucas marries older nurse Kristina "Kris" Hedvigson, who has substantial savings. Although Kris loves Lucas and helps him in a variety of ways, he is indifferent toward her and considers her "stupid" although she is an excellent nurse. Lucas cares only about his medical work and frequently clashes with other doctors whom he considers incompetent; he even heavily criticizes his best friend, the wealthy Alfred Boone. Kris, Alfred, and Lucas' mentor Dr. Aarons try to humanize him and teach him that all doctors sometimes make mistakes.

Lucas looks down on doctors who focus on making money, and after completing his internship, he accepts a position working with Dr. Dave Runkleman in his busy practice in rural Greenville, where many patients lack the money to pay. Runkleman, who has a life-threatening heart condition, hired Lucas to help with the workload and perhaps take over the practice. Lucas is overworked and frustrated with the incompetent head of the local hospital. He has an affair with rich widow Harriet Lang, causing Kris, who is secretly pregnant, to finally leave him. When Runkleman's heart condition flares up, Lucas performs surgery to save his life, but makes a mistake during the surgery and Runkleman dies. Struggling to cope with his failure, Lucas begs Kris to help him, and the two reconcile.

== Cast ==
- Olivia de Havilland as Kristina Hedvigson
- Robert Mitchum as Dr. Lucas Marsh
- Frank Sinatra as Dr. Alfred Boone
- Gloria Grahame as Harriet Lang
- Broderick Crawford as Dr. Aarons
- Charles Bickford as Dr. Dave W. Runkleman
- Myron McCormick as Dr. Clem Snider
- Lon Chaney Jr. as Job Marsh
- Jesse White as Ben Cosgrove
- Harry Morgan as Oley
- Lee Marvin as Brundage
- Virginia Christine as Bruni
- Eve McVeagh as Mrs Ferris
- Mae Clarke as Nurse Odell
- Whit Bissell as Dr. Dietrich
- Jerry Paris as Thompson (uncredited)
- Nancy Kulp as Greenville patient (uncredited)
- Robert Bailey as patient Charlie (uncredited)
- Gertrude Hoffman as Mrs. Payton (uncredited)
- Paul Guilfoyle as Mr. Burke (uncredited)

== Production ==
The picture was Stanley Kramer's first time directing a theatrical film.

== Reception ==
In a contemporary review for The New York Times, critic Bosley Crowther panned the film, including Kramer's directing and Mitchum's acting: "The delineator of this exegesis is a stolid young medical man whose personality and fierce determination should make a feature-length study in themselves. And the fact that Mr. Kramer has not managed to force a clear understanding of his man is quite as much a shortcoming of the picture as is the flat performance of Robert Mitchum in the role. ... With so much dissecting in his picture—and so much of it being good—it is too bad that Mr. Kramer couldn't have done a little on his characters."

The Philadelphia Inquirer, citing the huge sales of the source novel, thought the film had "perhaps the largest ready-made audience since Gone With the Wind", though "Whether this audience will be satisfied with the compressed, considerably altered version Kramer has given them remains to be seen….a disturbing lack of courage in the script which treads timidly in dealing with the seamier side of medicine…badly miscast in its two key roles…. Mitchum is, bluntly, a shattering disappointment…. Expressionless, ill at ease, Mitchum moves stolidly through a series of episodes which should certainly have revealed him as more than a robot. Equally at sea is Olivia de Havilland, bleached and with a Swedish accent that comes and goes….she even, following her husband's infidelity, orders Luke from the house, a thing Thompson's devoted doormat of a woman would never have dreamed of doing…. far better than the stars are Charles Bickford…and Broderick Crawford…. Lon Chaney is grotesque as Luke's alcoholic father; Gloria Grahame a conventional movie siren…and Myron McCormick far too pleasant as the unethical, incompetent head of Greenville's mismanaged hospital."

The Citizen-News praised the film's authenticity: "There is a fine ring of authenticity to every scene involving the story's medical aspects, and the fast 'shock' clip showing the beating heart of a patient takes you, scalpel in hand, into the surgical center of the hospital." However, the paper's review was critical of the acting and casting: "... Bickford's acting was the one bright spot in a set of standard performances. ... [T]he principal roles were miscast, with the exception of Bickford and Miss Grahame."

The Los Angeles Times described the film's premiere at the Stanley-Warner Beverly Hills Theatre as "... truly festive ... with an especially large street crowd, and a mood of celebration that was all prevailing." The newspaper's critic Edwin Schallert praised the film, calling it "... one of the strongest dramatic pictures exhibited to the public thus far this year."

== Release ==
Not as a Stranger earned a worldwide distribution gross of over $8 million, and a profit of $1.8 million. It was United Artists' highest-grossing film at the time.

The film was released on Blu-ray disc by Kino Lorber in 2018.

== Awards ==
Not as a Stranger was nominated for an Academy Award for Best Sound Recording (Watson Jones). Frank Sinatra was nominated for a BAFTA Award for Best Foreign Actor, and Charles Bickford won the National Board of Review award for Best Supporting Actor.

== See also ==
- List of American films of 1955
