= The Battle of Gettysburg (1955 film) =

1955 documentary film by Herman Hoffman

- Directed by: Herman Hoffman
- Written by: Dore Schary
- Narrated by: Leslie Nielsen
- Cinematography: Eastmancolor, CinemaScope
- Distributed by: MGM
- Release date: 1955
- Running time: 30 minutes
- Country: United States
- Language: English

The Battle of Gettysburg is a 1955 American documentary film about the Battle of Gettysburg during the American Civil War. The film was nominated for two Academy Awards.

The documentary was filmed in Cinemascope and Eastmancolor entirely on location at the Gettysburg National Military Park in south-central Pennsylvania. Leslie Nielsen provides narration, while songs from the Civil War era are played in the background with the sound effects of battle. At the end of the film, Nielsen reads the Gettysburg Address.

No actors appear onscreen. Memorial statues and bas-reliefs already present on the battlefield were photographed from various angles and distances, then the footage was juxtaposed to suggest that the static images were actual characters taking part in a dramatic re-enactment of the battle. In some scenes, the turbulence created by an off-screen helicopter is used to press down tall grasses, suggesting the passage of invisible soldiers.

In 1956, the film was nominated for Oscars for Best Documentary, Short Subject (Dore Schary) and Best Short Subject, Two-reel (also for Dore Schary).

== See also ==
- List of American films of 1955
