= 13th Golden Globe Awards =

Film award ceremony in 1956

- Date: February 23, 1956

Highlights
- Best Picture: East of Eden

The 13th Golden Globe Awards, honoring the best in film for 1955 films, were held on February 23, 1956.

== Winners ==
=== Best Motion Picture - Drama ===
East of Eden directed by Elia Kazan

=== Best Motion Picture - Comedy or Musical ===
Guys and Dolls directed by Joseph L. Mankiewicz

=== Best Performance by an Actor in a Motion Picture - Drama ===
Ernest Borgnine - Marty

=== Best Performance by an Actress in a Motion Picture - Drama ===
Anna Magnani - The Rose Tattoo

=== Best Performance by an Actor in a Motion Picture - Comedy or Musical ===
Tom Ewell - The Seven Year Itch

=== Best Performance by an Actress in a Motion Picture - Comedy or Musical ===
Jean Simmons - Guys and Dolls

=== Best Performance by an Actor in a Supporting Role in a Motion Picture ===
Arthur Kennedy - Trial

=== Best Performance by an Actress in a Supporting Role in a Motion Picture ===
Marisa Pavan - The Rose Tattoo

=== Best Director - Motion Picture ===
Joshua Logan - Picnic

=== Best Foreign Language Film ===
Curvas peligrosas (Dangerous Curves) from Mexico

Eyes of Children from Japan

Sons, Mothers, and a General from West Germany

Stella from Greece

The Word from Denmark

=== Henrietta Award (World Film Favorites) Male ===
Marlon Brando

=== Henrietta Award (World Film Favorites) Female ===
Grace Kelly

=== Special Achievement Award ===
James Dean Award given posthumously for Best Dramatic Actor.

=== Cecil B. DeMille Award ===
Jack L. Warner

=== Best Motion Picture - Outdoor Drama ===
Wichita

=== Television Achievement ===
Desi Arnaz for American Comedy

Dinah Shore for Walt Disney anthology television series episode Davy Crockett.

=== Promoting International Understanding ===
Love Is a Many-Splendored Thing- directed by Henry King

=== New Star of the Year Actor ===
(Two way tie)

Ray Danton in I'll Cry Tomorrow

Russ Tamblyn in Hit the Deck

=== New Star of the Year Actress ===
(Three way tie)

Anita Ekberg in Blood Alley

Victoria Shaw in The Eddy Duchin Story

Dana Wynter in The View from Pompey's Head

=== Hollywood Citizenship Award ===
Esther Williams
