= Jack Stubbs =

American set decorator

- Born: April 6, 1913; Scotland
- Died: February 2, 1997 (aged 83); Los Angeles, California, USA
- Occupation: Set decorator
- Years active: 1937-1978

Jack Stubbs (April 6, 1913 – February 2, 1997) was an American set decorator, who was born in Scotland. He was nominated for an Academy Award in the category Best Art Direction for the film Love Is a Many-Splendored Thing.

== Selected filmography ==
- Love Is a Many-Splendored Thing (1955)
