= 1955 New York Film Critics Circle Awards =

21st New York Film Critics Circle Awards

21st New York Film Critics Circle Awards

January 21, 1956
(announced December 27, 1955)

Marty

The 21st New York Film Critics Circle Awards honored the best filmmaking of 1955.

== Winners ==
- Best Film:
  - Marty
- Best Actor:
  - Ernest Borgnine – Marty
- Best Actress:
  - Anna Magnani – The Rose Tattoo
- Best Director:
  - David Lean – Summertime
- Best Foreign Language Film (tie):
  - Diabolique (Les diaboliques) • France
  - Umberto D. • Italy
