= Academy Award for Best Supporting Actor =

Award presented annually by the Academy of Motion Picture Arts and Sciences

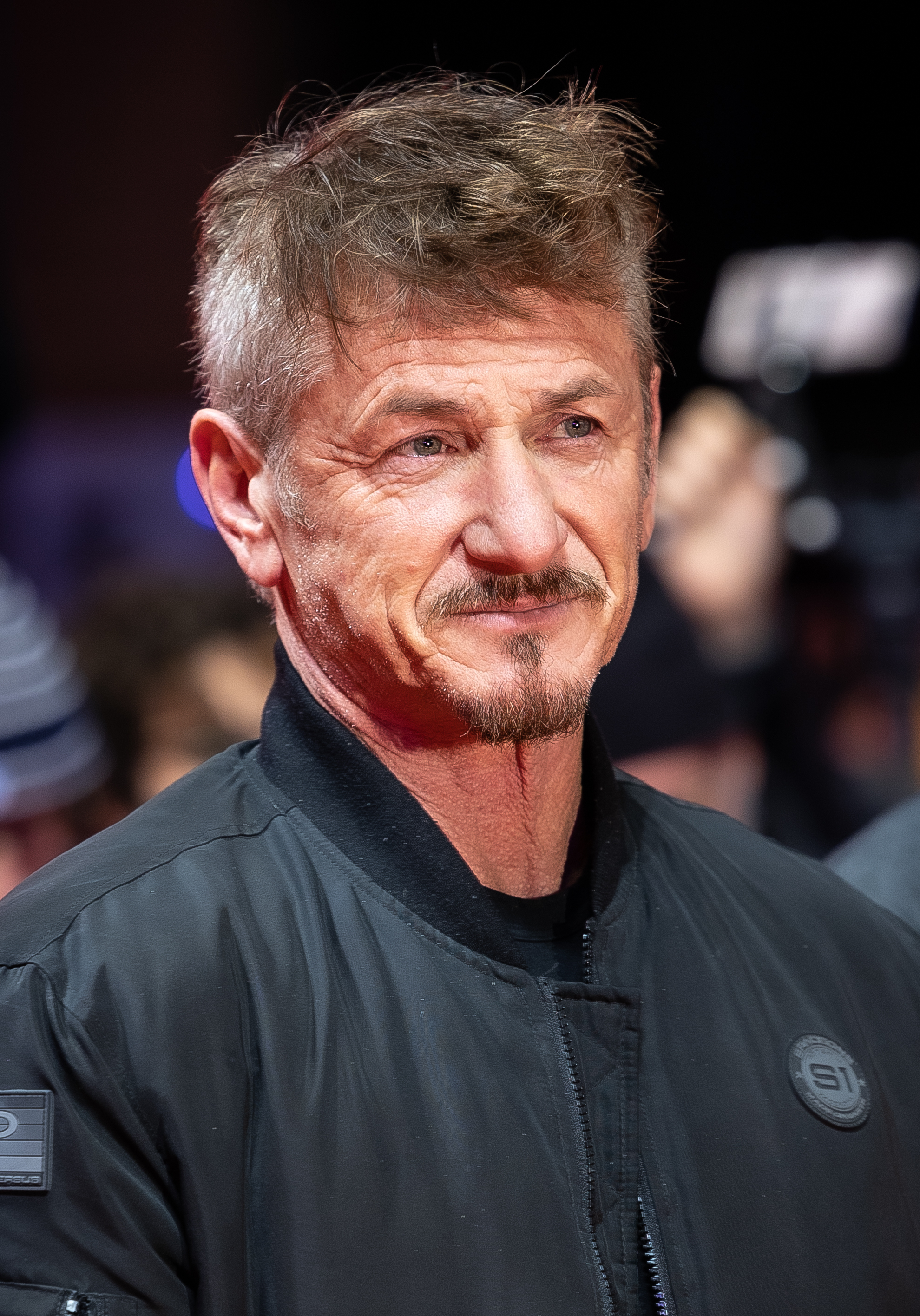
- The 2026 recipient: Sean Penn
- Awarded for: Best Performance by an Actor in a Supporting Role
- Country: United States
- Presented by: Academy of Motion Picture Arts and Sciences (AMPAS)
- First award: March 4, 1937; 89 years ago (for films released in 1936)
- Most recent winner: Sean Penn, One Battle After Another (2025)

Highlights
- Most awards: Walter Brennan (3)
- Most nominations: Walter Brennan, Jeff Bridges, Robert Duvall, Arthur Kennedy, Jack Nicholson, Al Pacino, Claude Rains, and Mark Ruffalo (4)
- Website: oscars.org

The Academy Award for Best Supporting Actor is an award presented annually by the Academy of Motion Picture Arts and Sciences (AMPAS). It has been awarded since the 9th Academy Awards to an actor who has delivered an outstanding performance in a supporting role in a film released that year. The award is traditionally presented by the previous year's Best Supporting Actress winner. However, in recent years, it has shifted towards being presented by previous years' Best Supporting Actor winners instead. In lieu of the traditional Oscar statuette, supporting acting recipients were given plaques up until the 16th Academy Awards, when statuettes were awarded to each category instead.

The Best Supporting Actor award has been presented a total of 90 times, to 81 actors. The first winner was Walter Brennan for his role in Come and Get It (1936). The most recent winner is Sean Penn for One Battle After Another (2025). The record for most wins is three, held by Brennan–who won every other year within a succession of the first five years. Seven other actors have won twice. Brennan is also tied for receiving the most nominations in the category (with four altogether) along with Jeff Bridges, Robert Duvall, Arthur Kennedy, Jack Nicholson, Al Pacino, Claude Rains, and Mark Ruffalo. For his performance in The Dark Knight (2008), Heath Ledger became the first actor to win posthumously in this category—and second overall. Christopher Plummer is the oldest actor to receive a nomination in any category at age 88, for All the Money in the World (2017).

== Nominations process ==
Nominees are currently determined by single transferable vote within the actors branch of AMPAS; winners are selected by a plurality vote from the entire eligible voting members of the Academy.

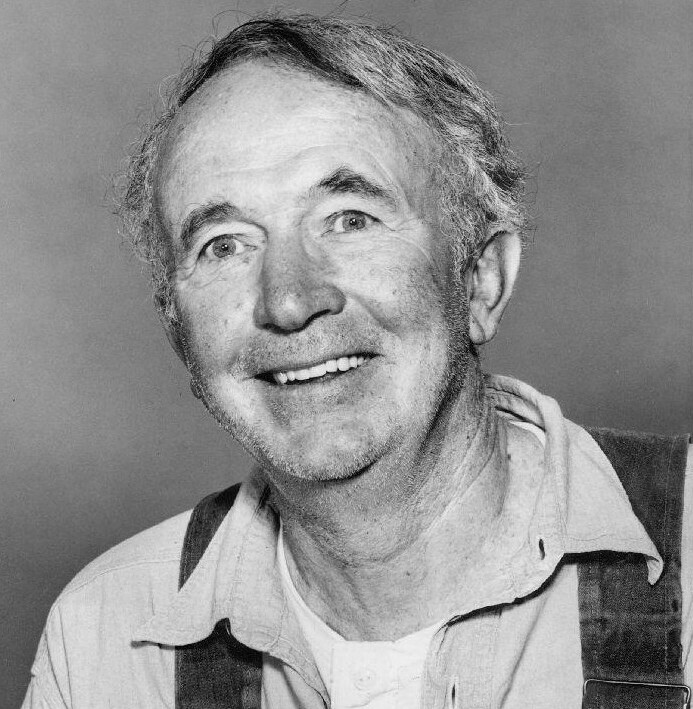
Walter Brennan was the inaugural winner, thrice over, for: Come and Get It (1936), Kentucky (1938), and The Westerner (1940).

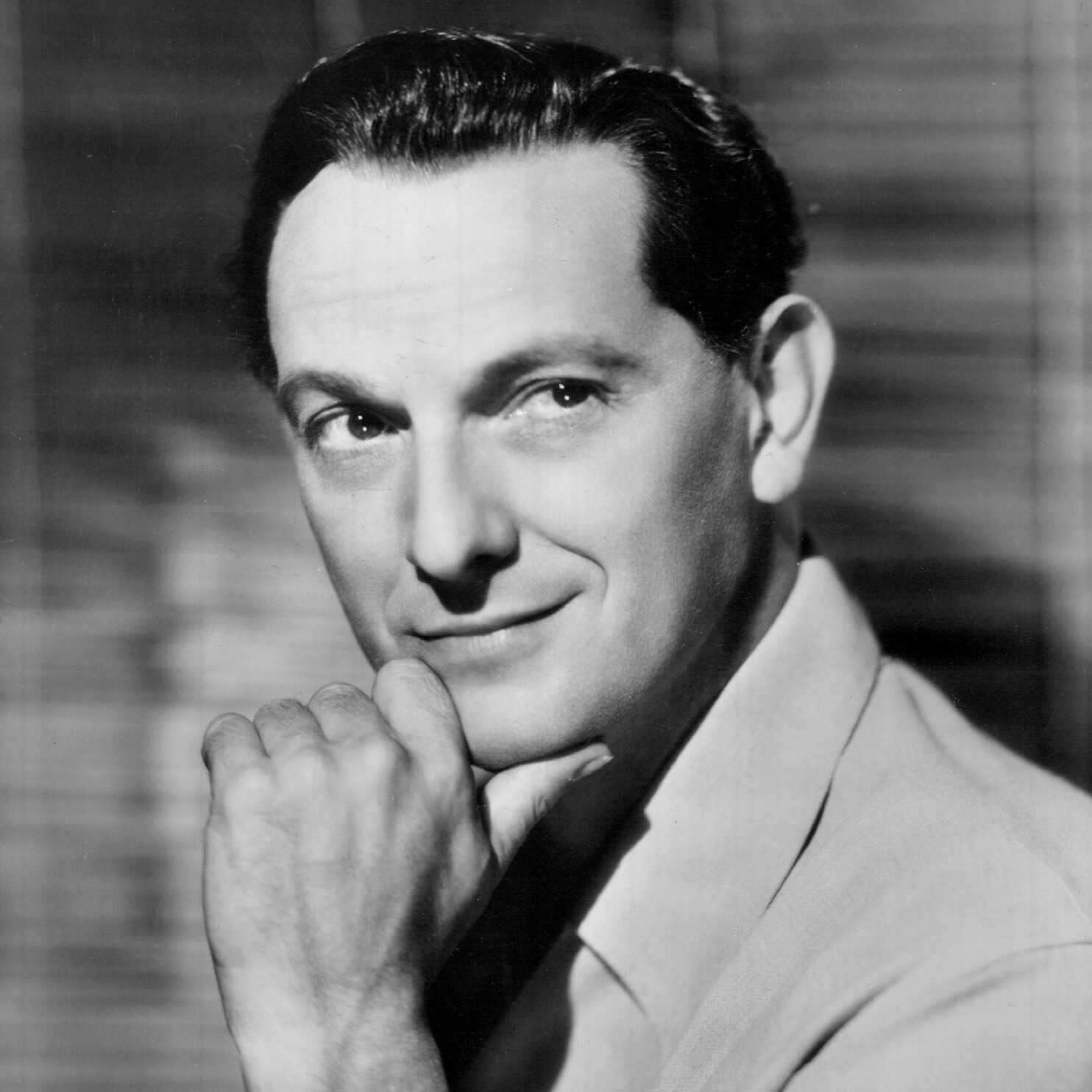
Joseph Schildkraut won for The Life of Émile Zola (1937).

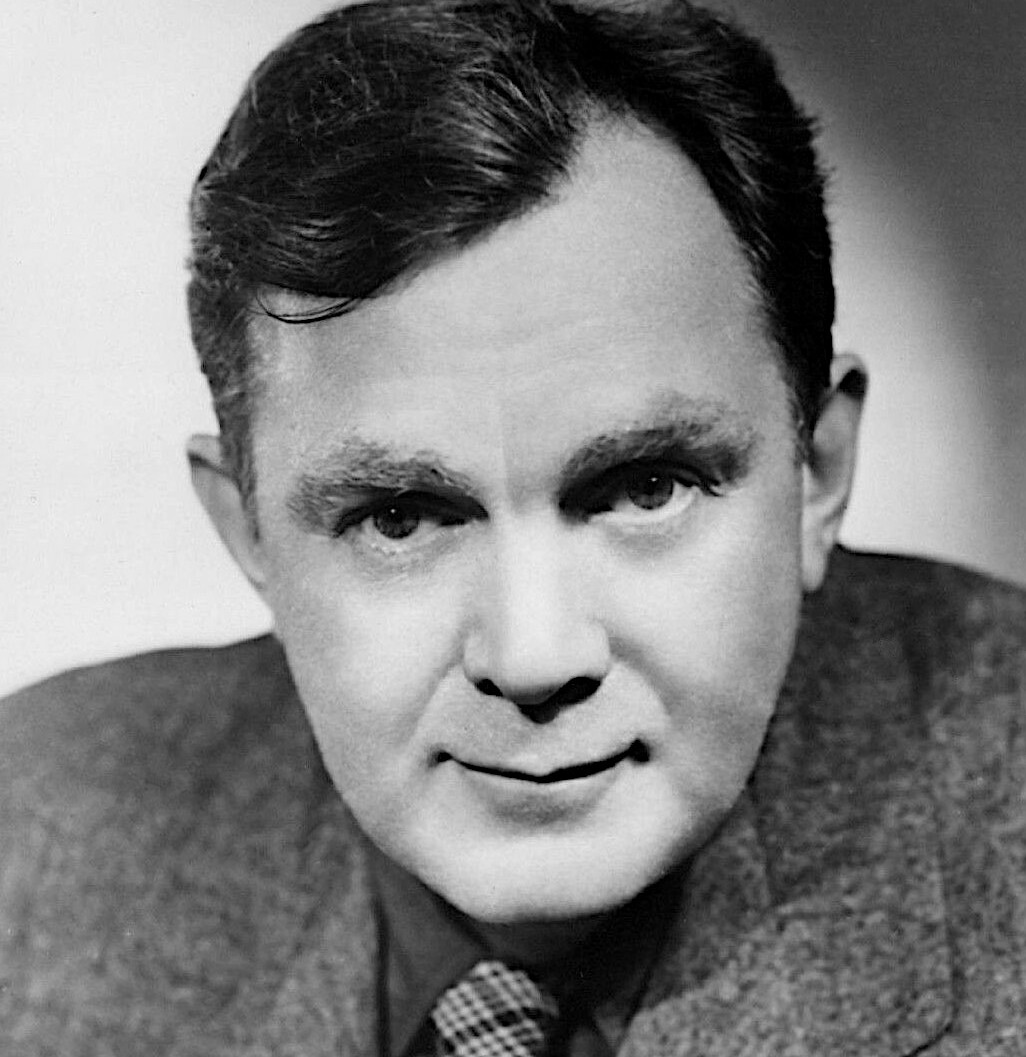
Thomas Mitchell won for Stagecoach (1939); first male to achieve the "Triple Crown of Acting".

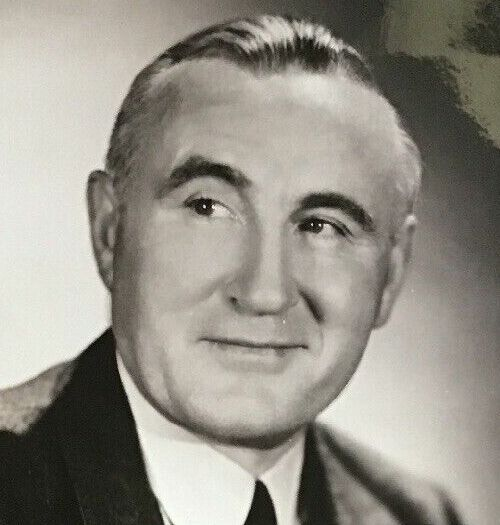
Donald Crisp won for How Green Was My Valley (1941).

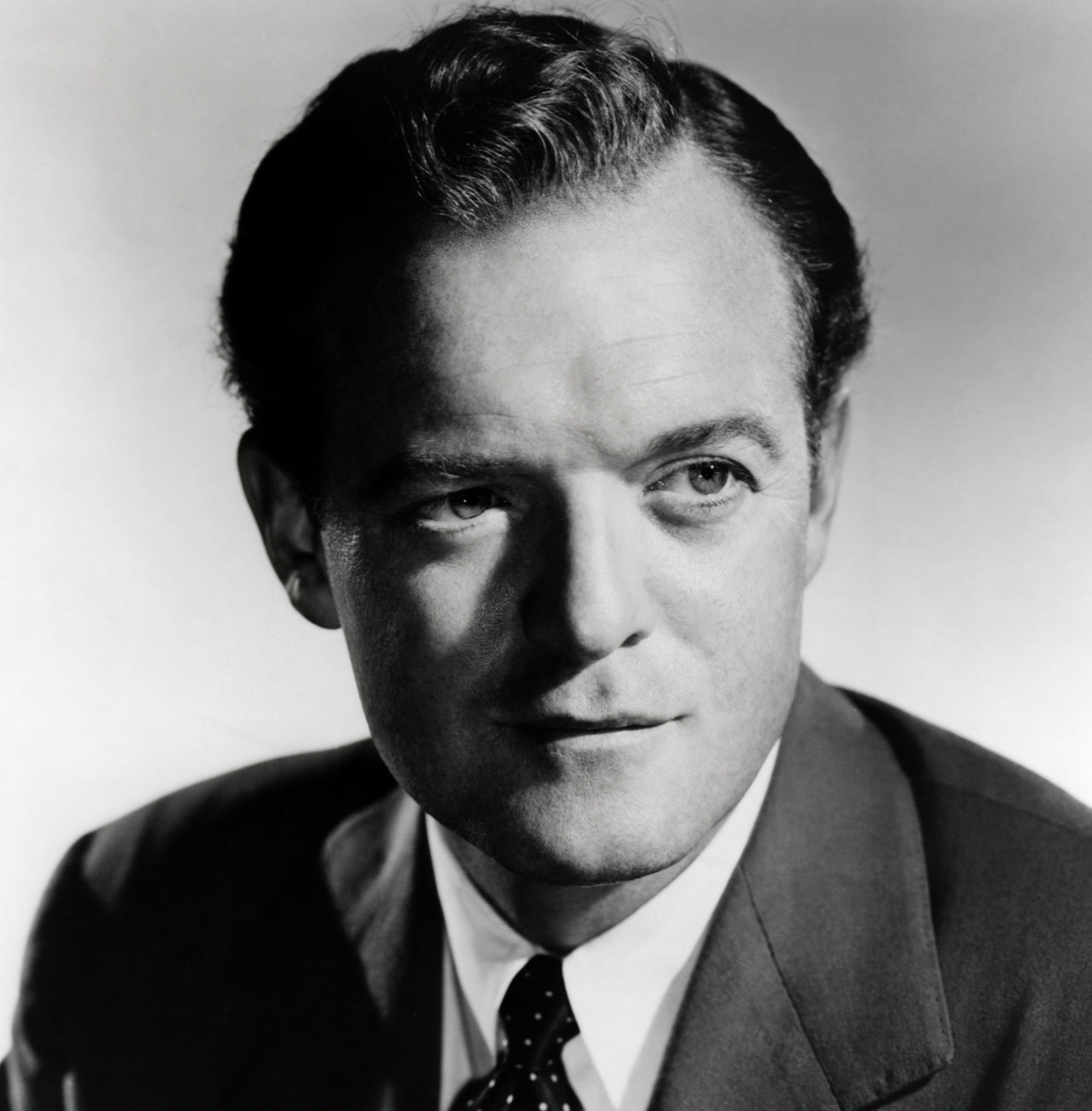
Van Heflin won for Johnny Eager (1942).

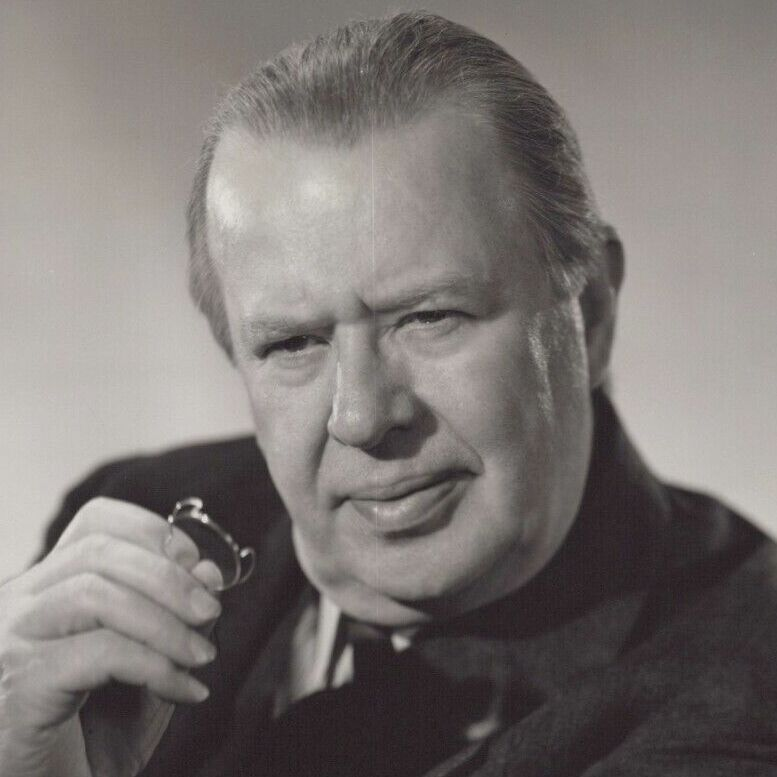
Charles Coburn won for The More the Merrier (1943).

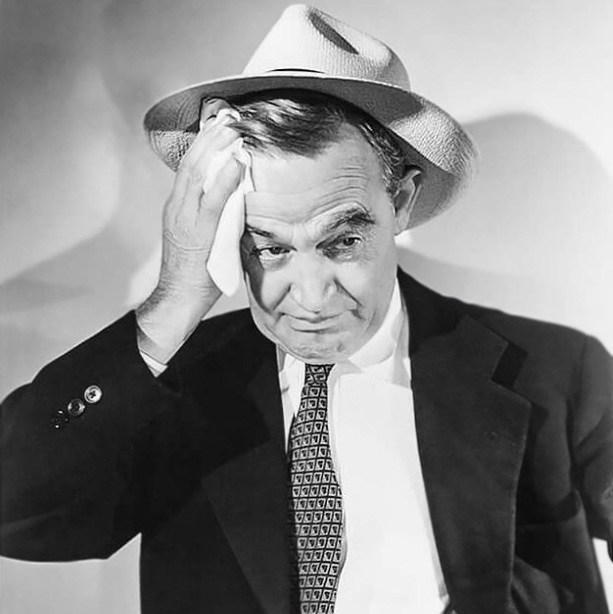
Barry Fitzgerald won for Going My Way (1944); only actor nommed in both lead + supporting for the same performance.

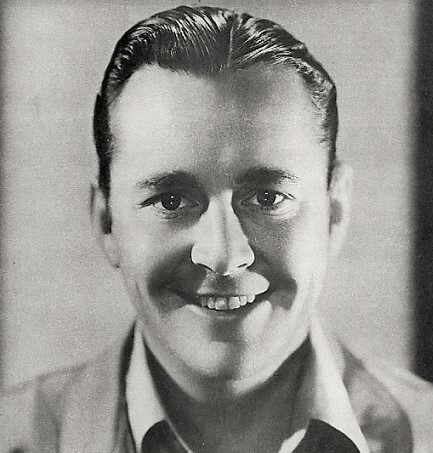
James Dunn won for A Tree Grows in Brooklyn (1945).

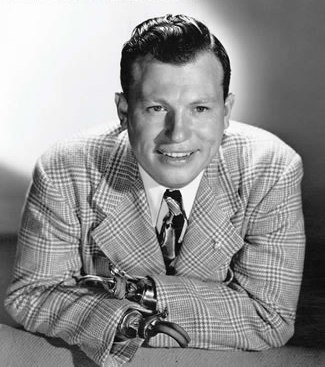
Harold Russell won for The Best Years of Our Lives (1946); w/ an Honorary bonus, became only person to earn two Oscars for the same role.

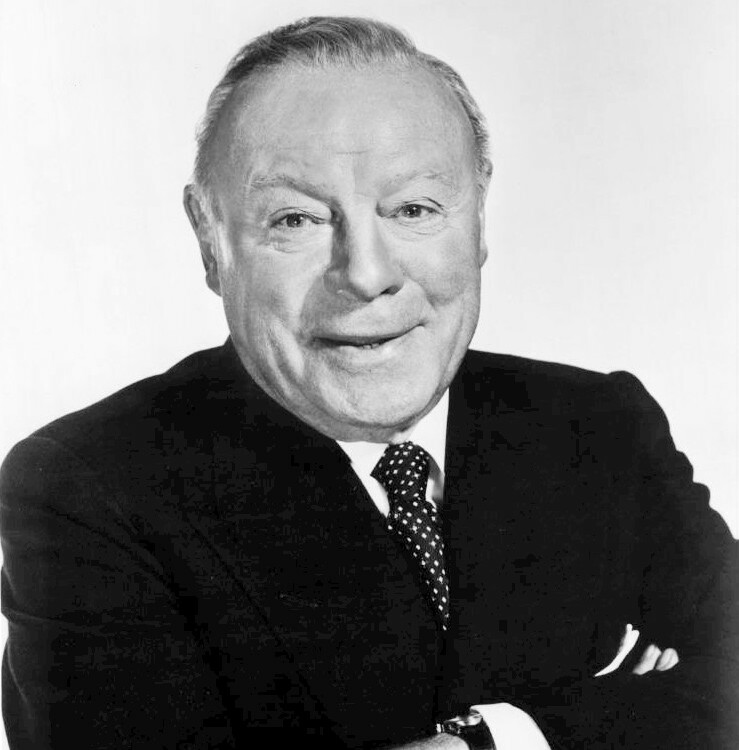
Edmund Gwenn won for Miracle on 34th Street (1947).

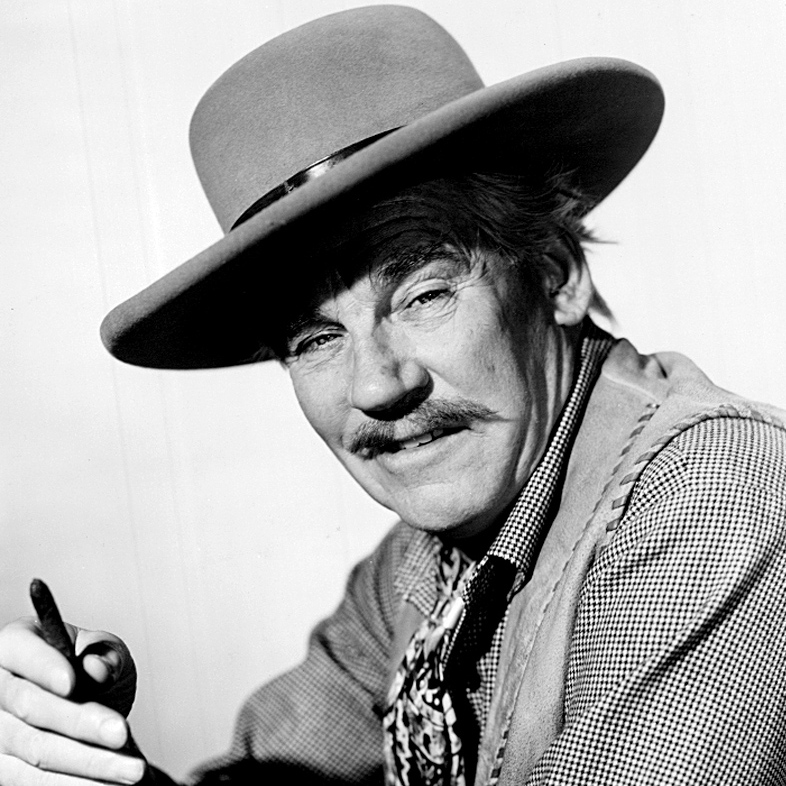
Walter Huston won for The Treasure of the Sierra Madre (1948).

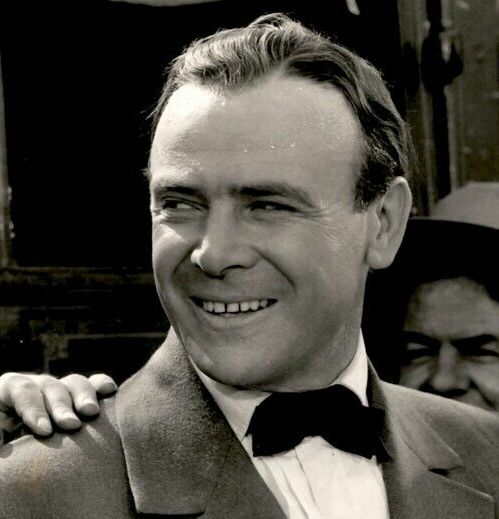
Dean Jagger won for Twelve O'Clock High (1949).

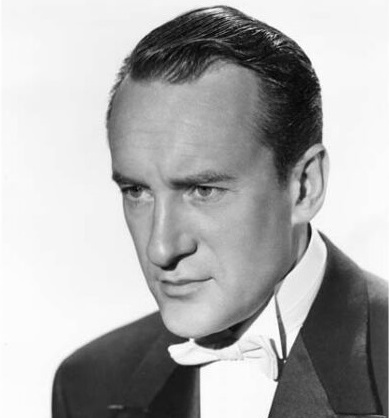
George Sanders won for All About Eve (1950).

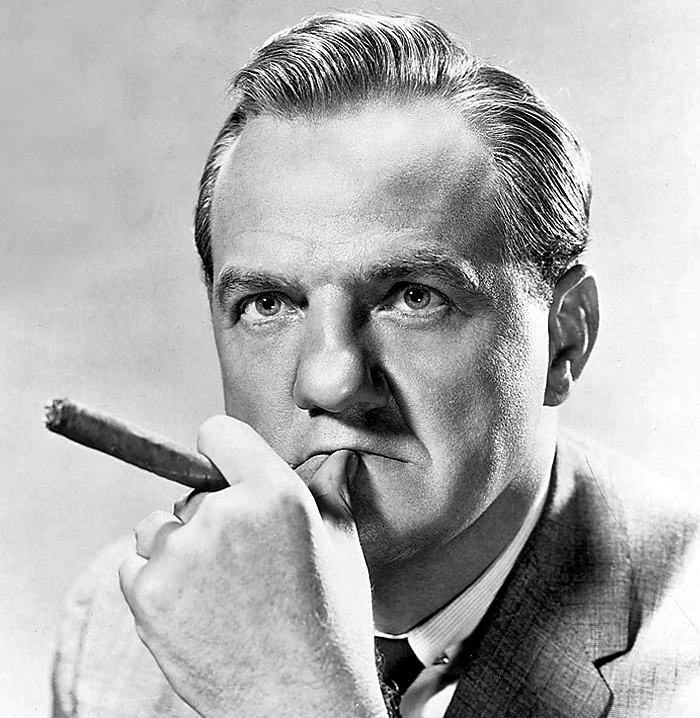
Karl Malden won for A Streetcar Named Desire (1951).

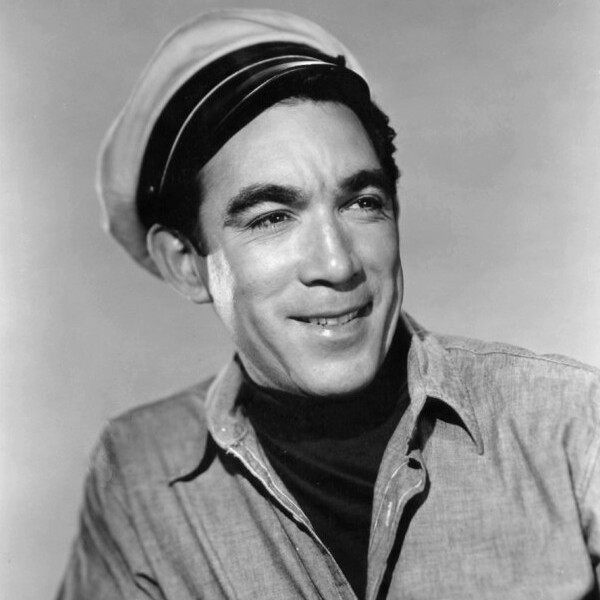
Anthony Quinn won twice, for Viva Zapata! (1952) and Lust for Life (1956); first Latino to win in this category.

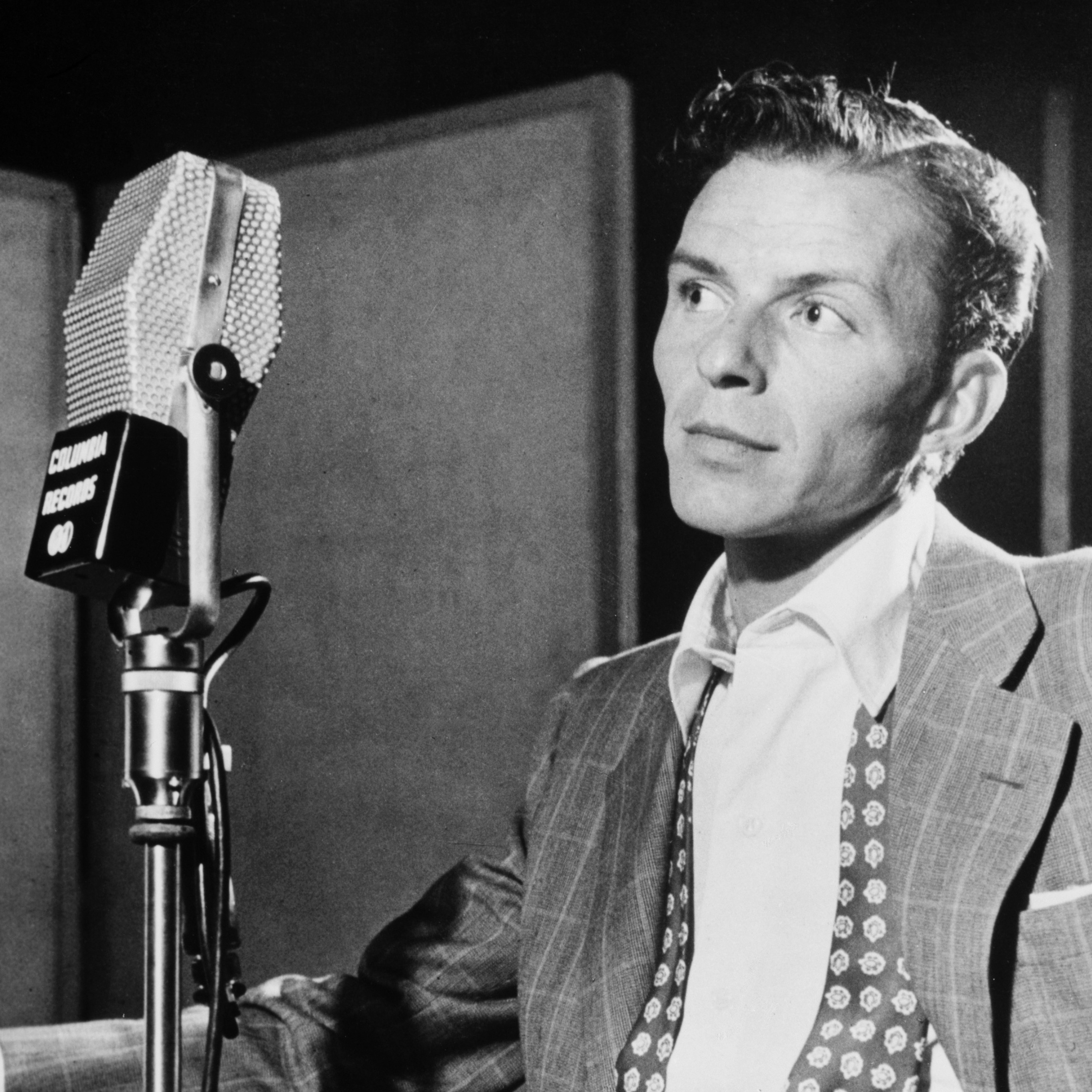
Frank Sinatra won for From Here to Eternity (1953).

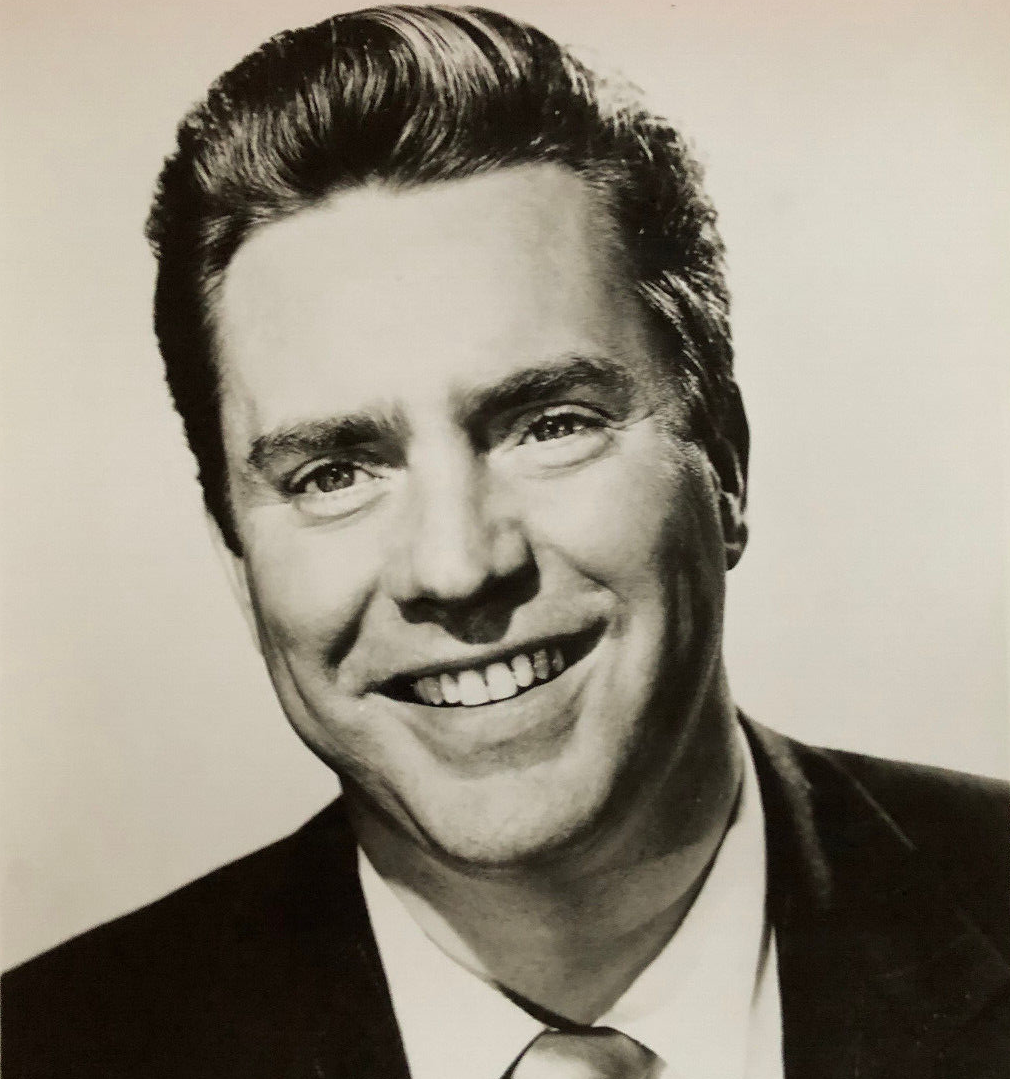
Edmond O'Brien won for The Barefoot Contessa (1954).

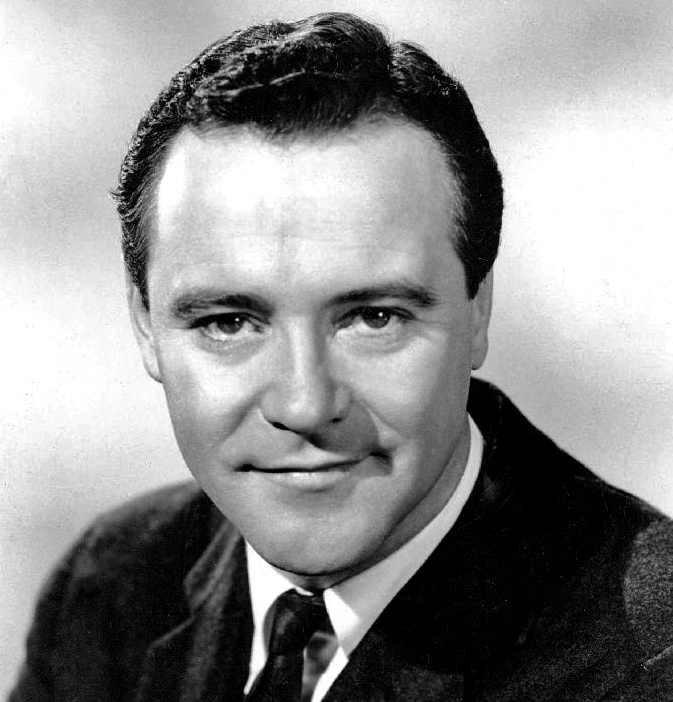
Jack Lemmon won for Mister Roberts (1955).

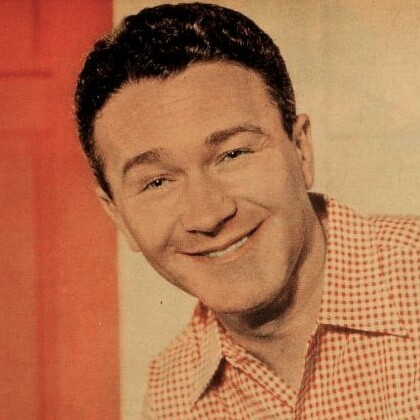
Red Buttons won for Sayonara (1957).

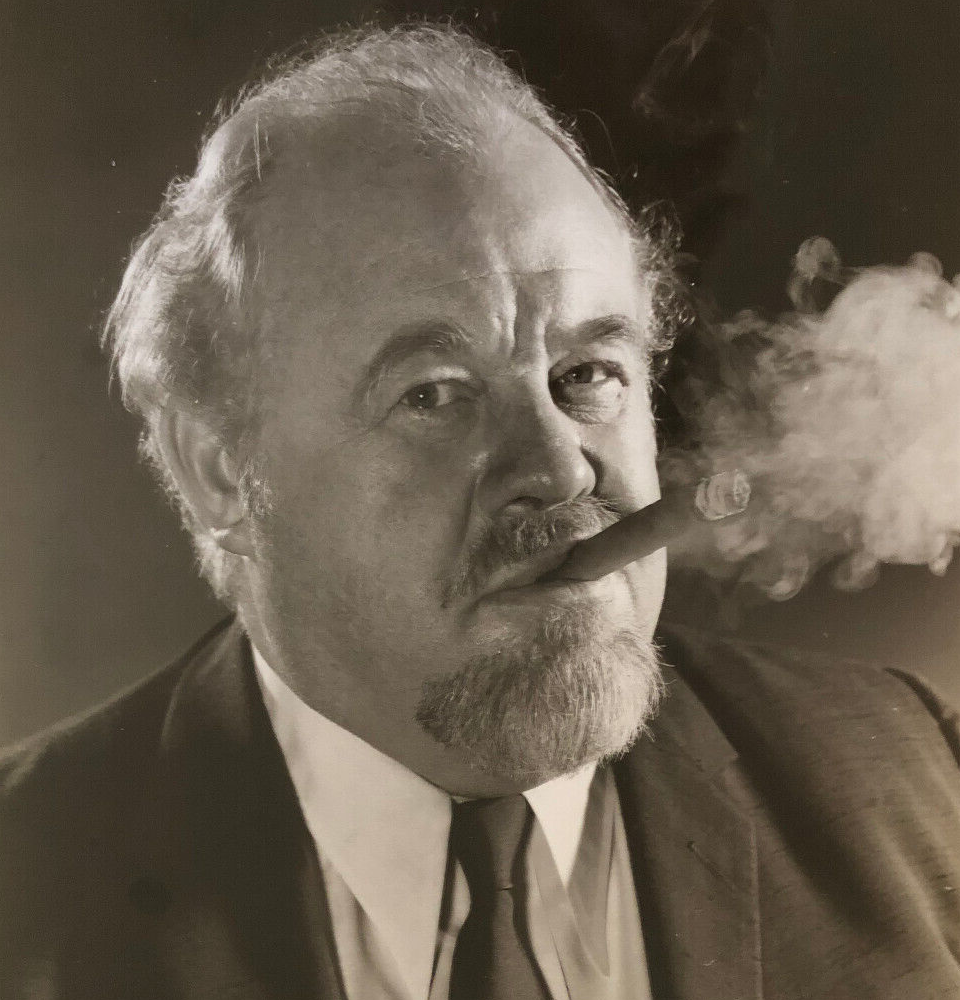
Burl Ives won for The Big Country (1958).

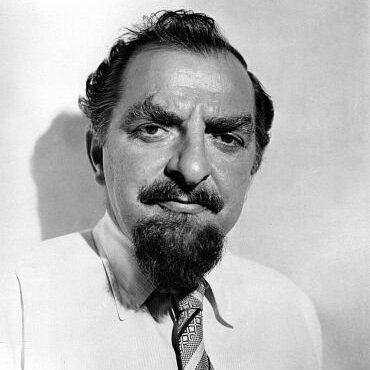
Hugh Griffith won for Ben-Hur (1959).

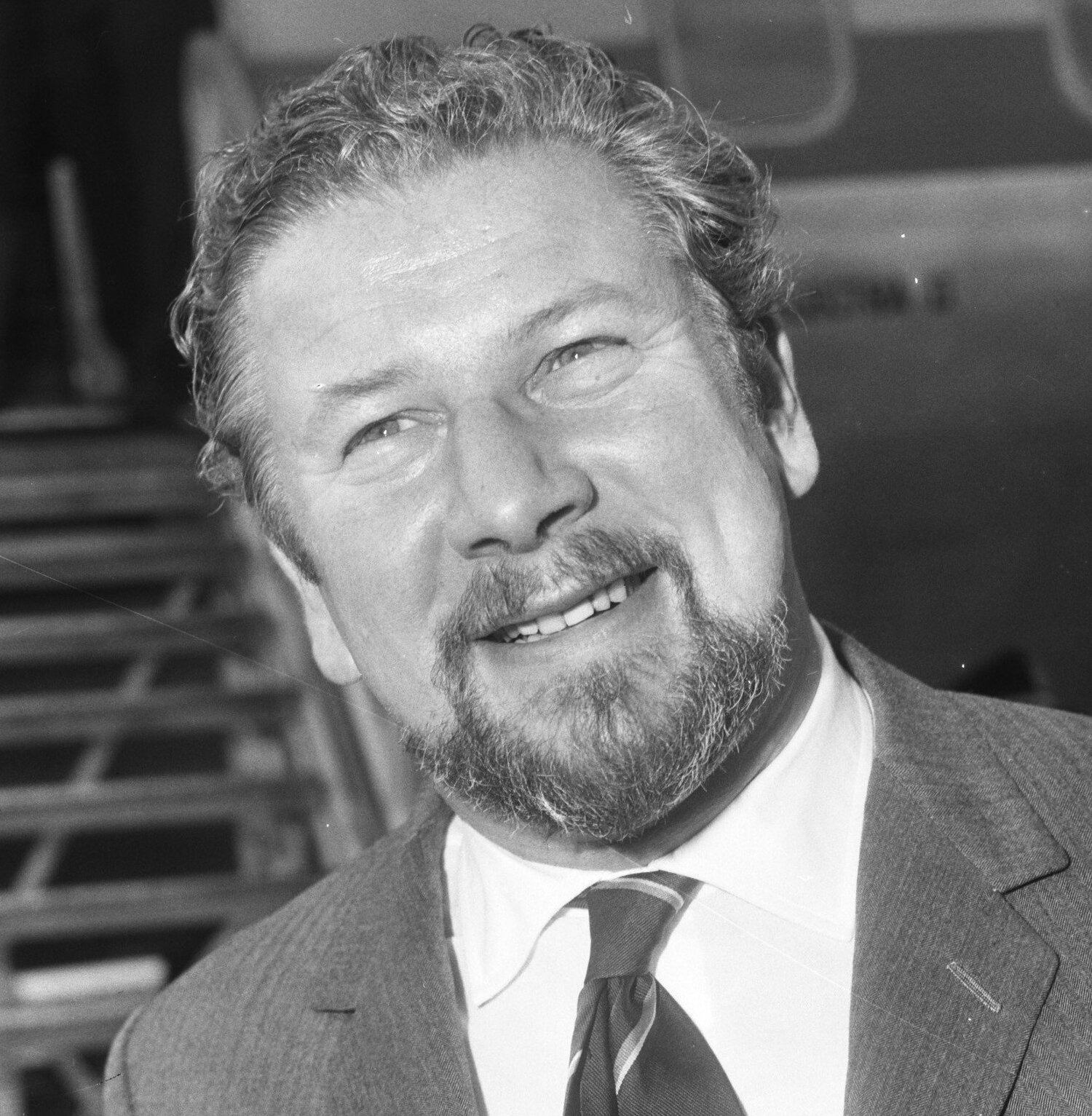
Peter Ustinov won twice, for Spartacus (1960) and Topkapi (1964).

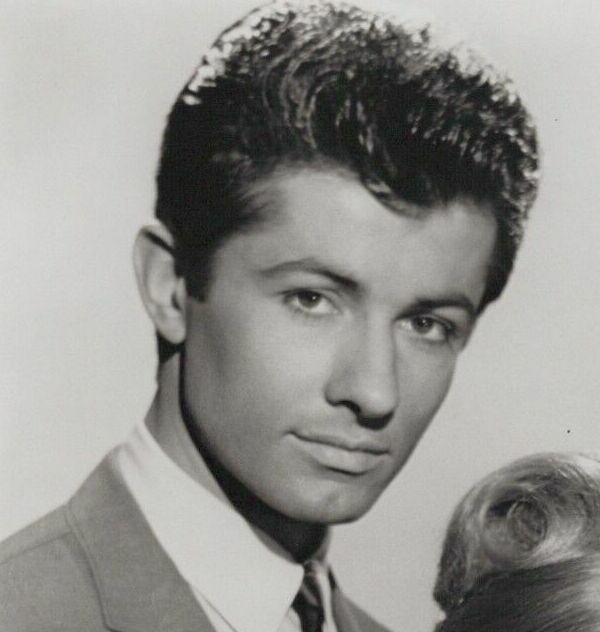
George Chakiris won for West Side Story (1961).

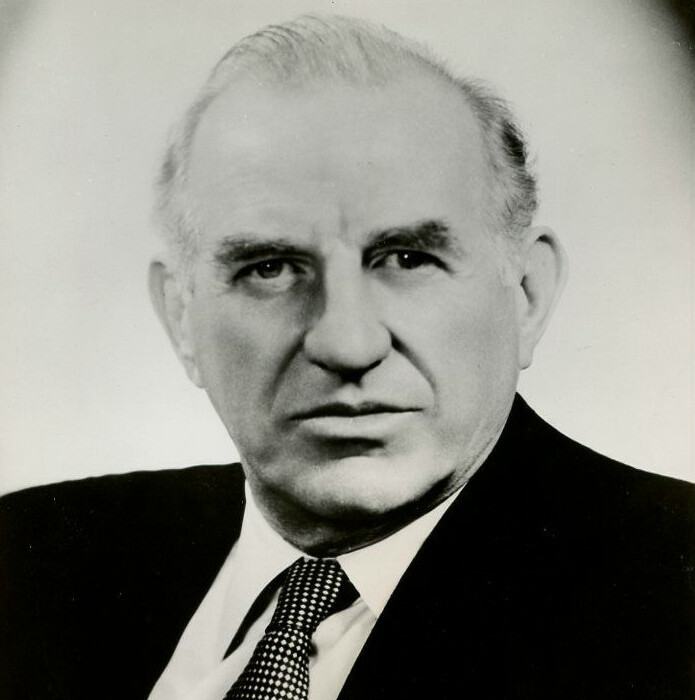
Ed Begley Sr. won for Sweet Bird of Youth (1962).

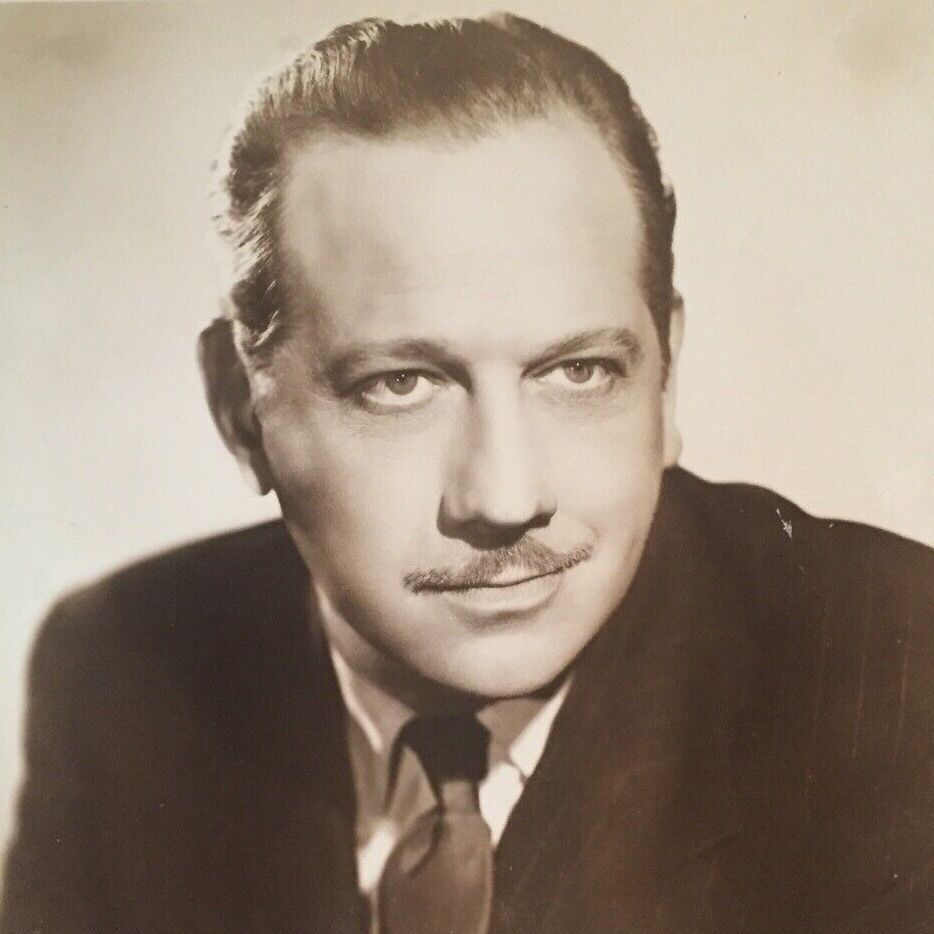
Melvyn Douglas won twice, for Hud (1963) and Being There (1979).

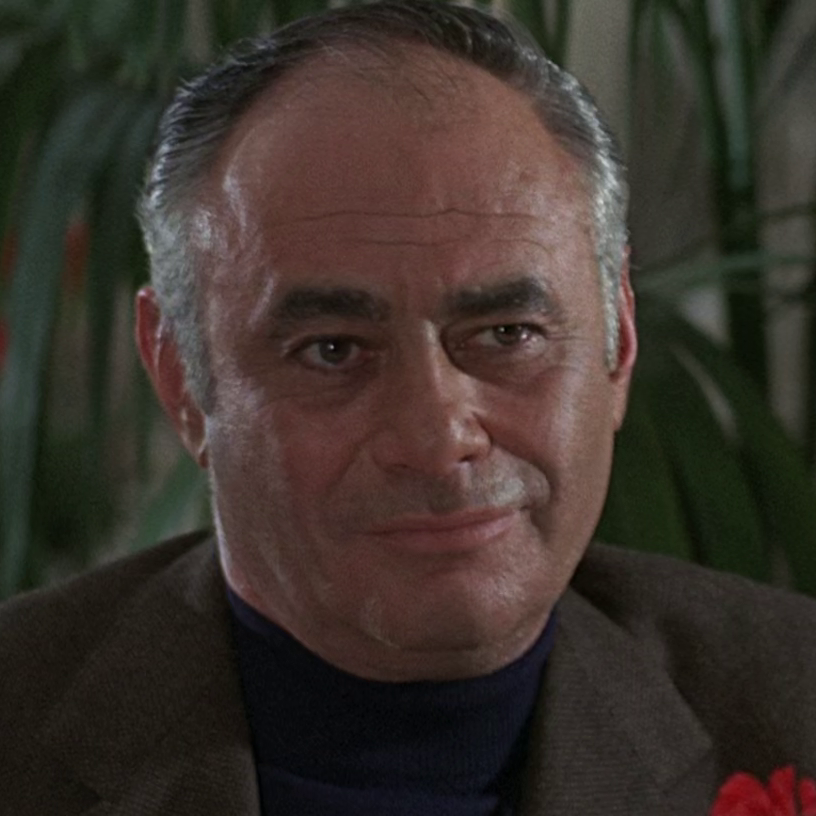
Martin Balsam won for A Thousand Clowns (1965).

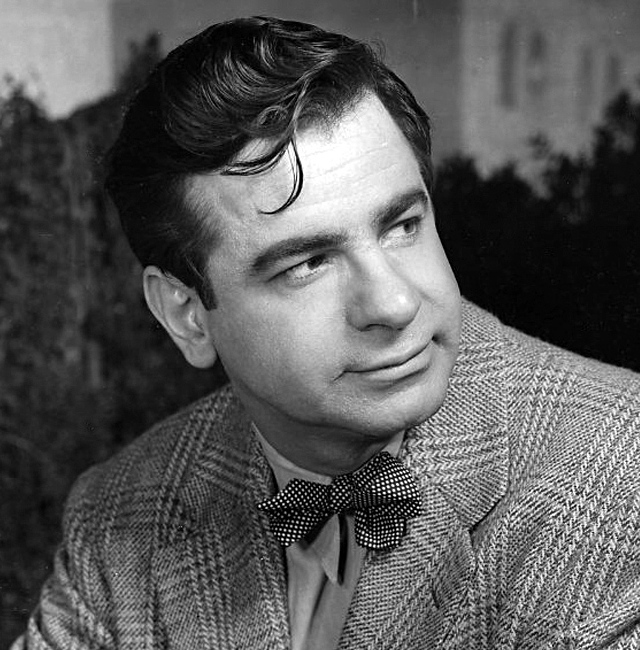
Walter Matthau won for The Fortune Cookie (1966).

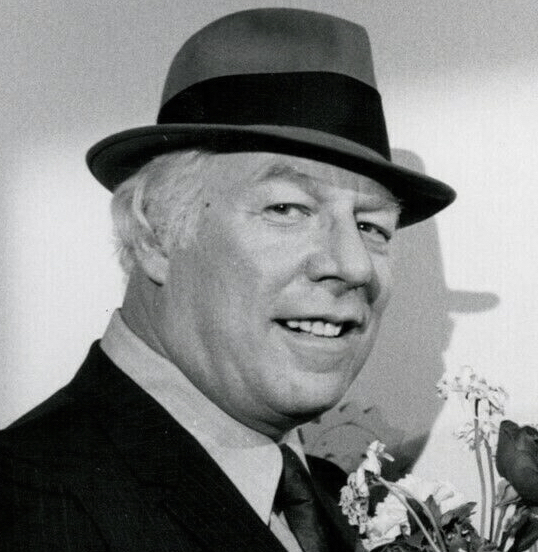
George Kennedy won for Cool Hand Luke (1967).

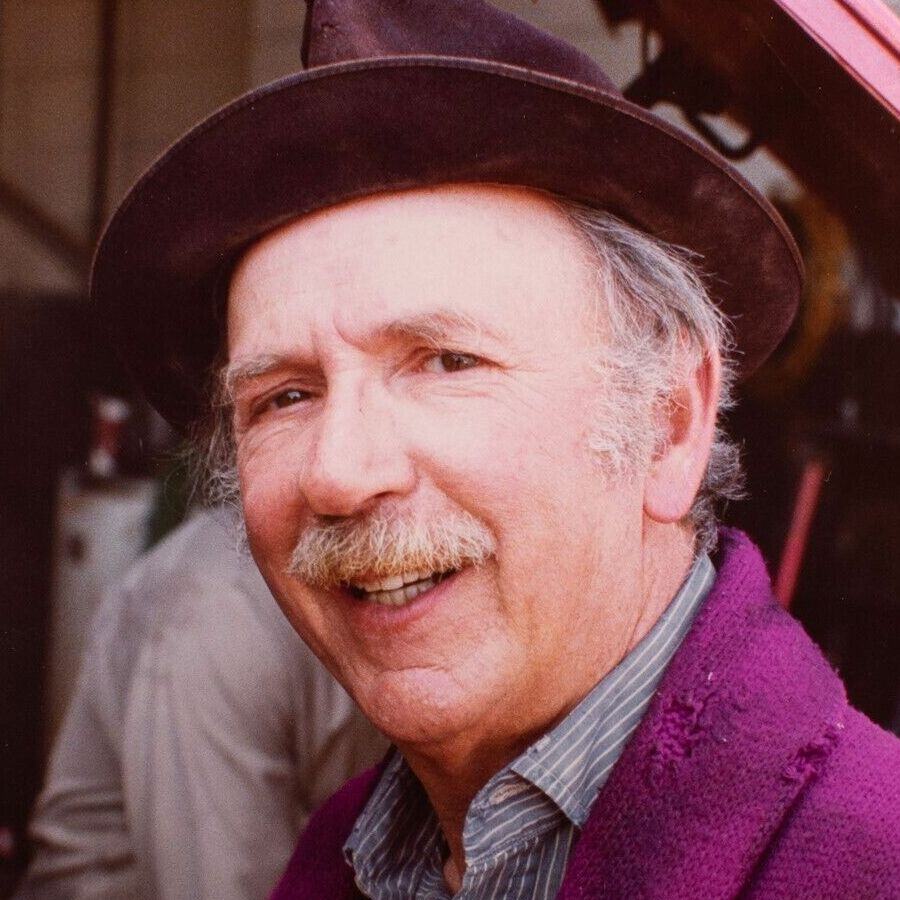
Jack Albertson won for The Subject Was Roses (1968).

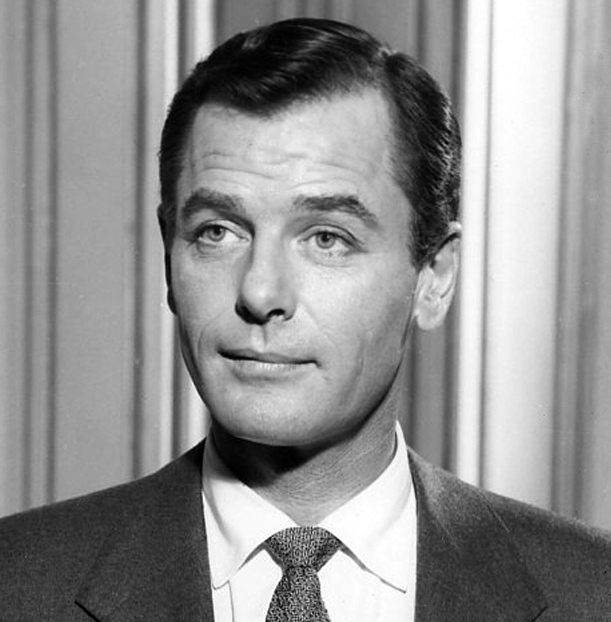
Gig Young won for They Shoot Horses, Don't They? (1969).

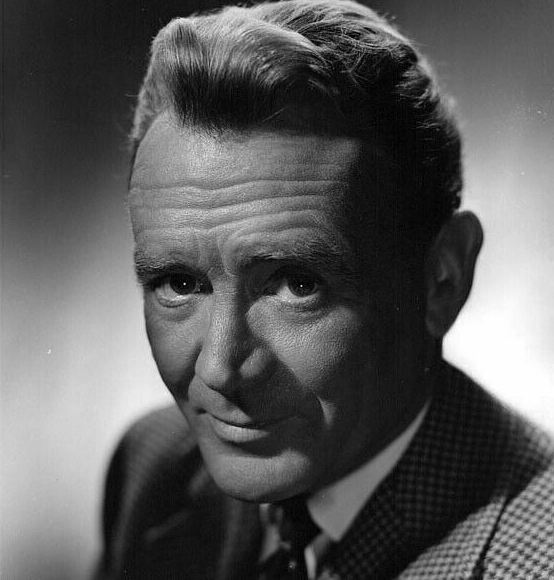
John Mills won for Ryan's Daughter (1970); first winner using BSL.

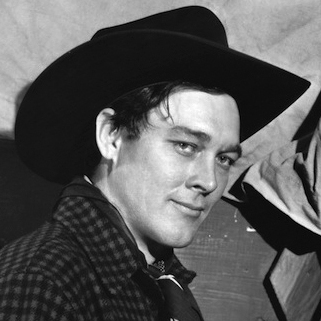
Ben Johnson won for The Last Picture Show (1971); this category's shortest winning performance, at 9m54s.

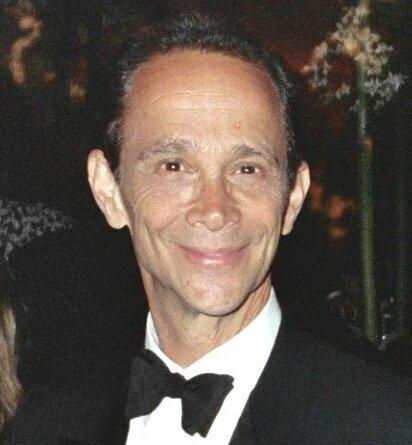
Joel Grey won for Cabaret (1972).

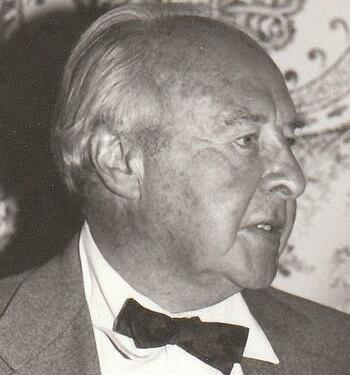
John Houseman won for The Paper Chase (1973).

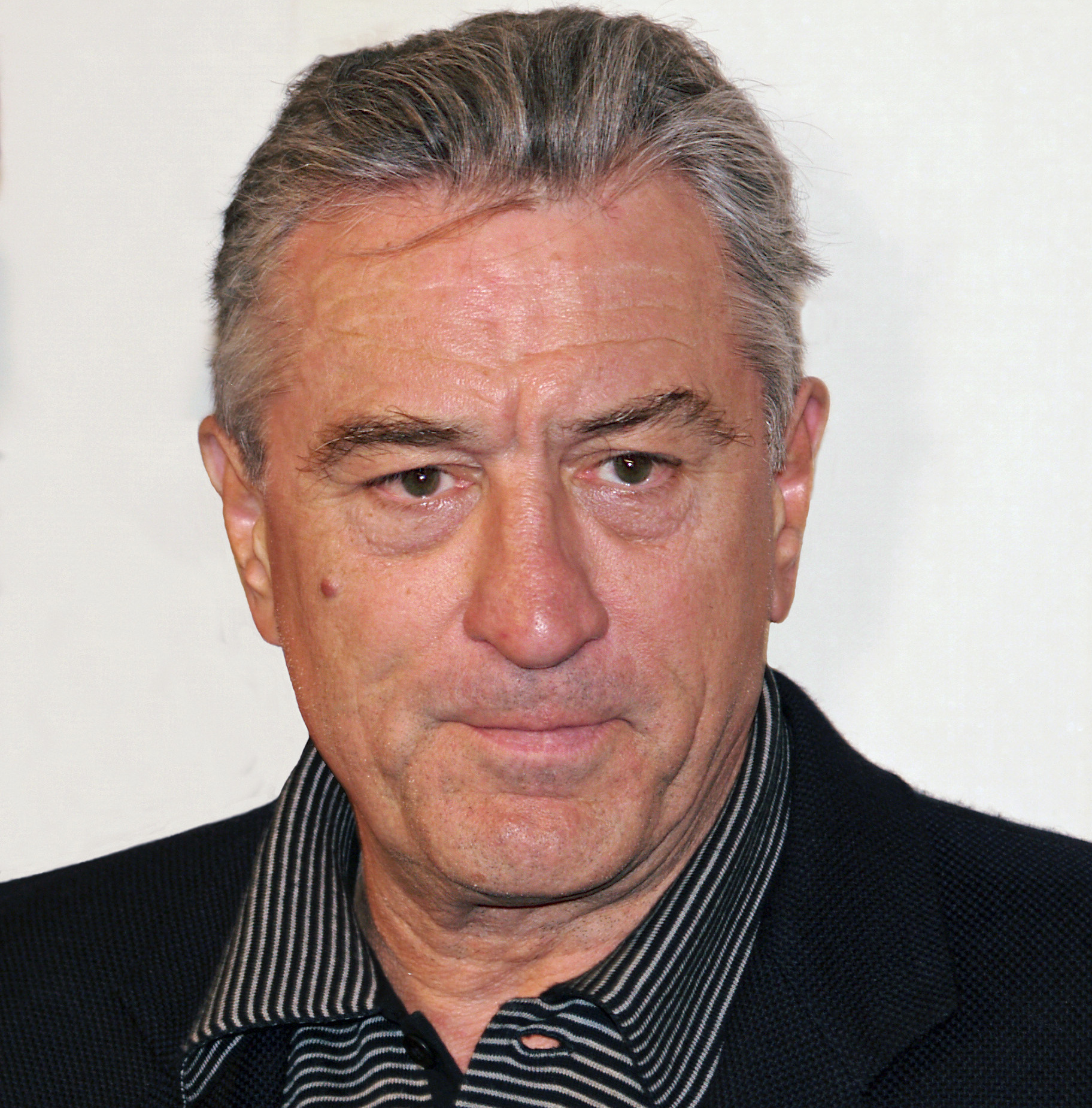
Robert De Niro won for The Godfather Part II (1974); first non-English dialogue role (Italian) in this category to win.

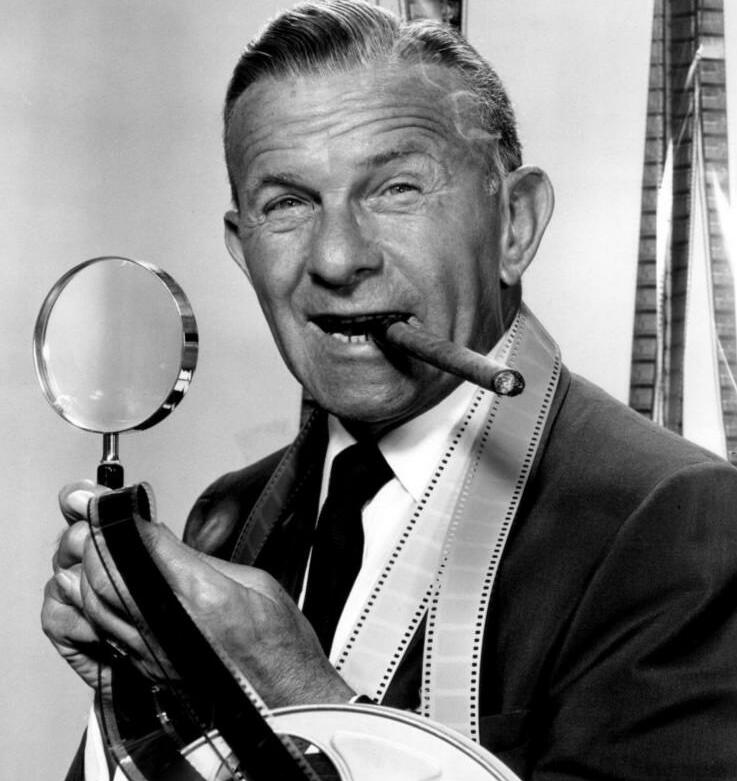
George Burns won for The Sunshine Boys (1975).

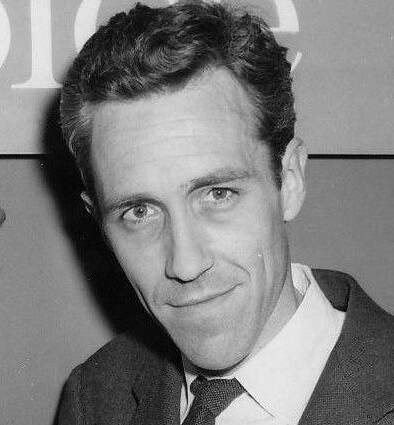
Jason Robards Jr. won twice consecutively—for All the President's Men (1976) and Julia (1977).

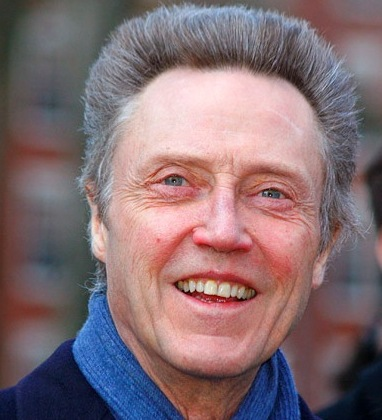
Christopher Walken won for The Deer Hunter (1978).

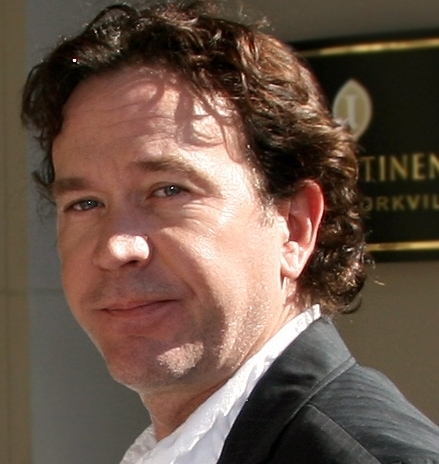
Timothy Hutton won for Ordinary People (1980); this category's youngest winner, at age 20.

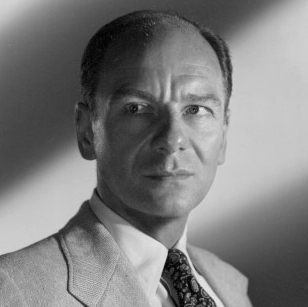
John Gielgud won for Arthur (1981); first out LGBTQ+ winner in this category.

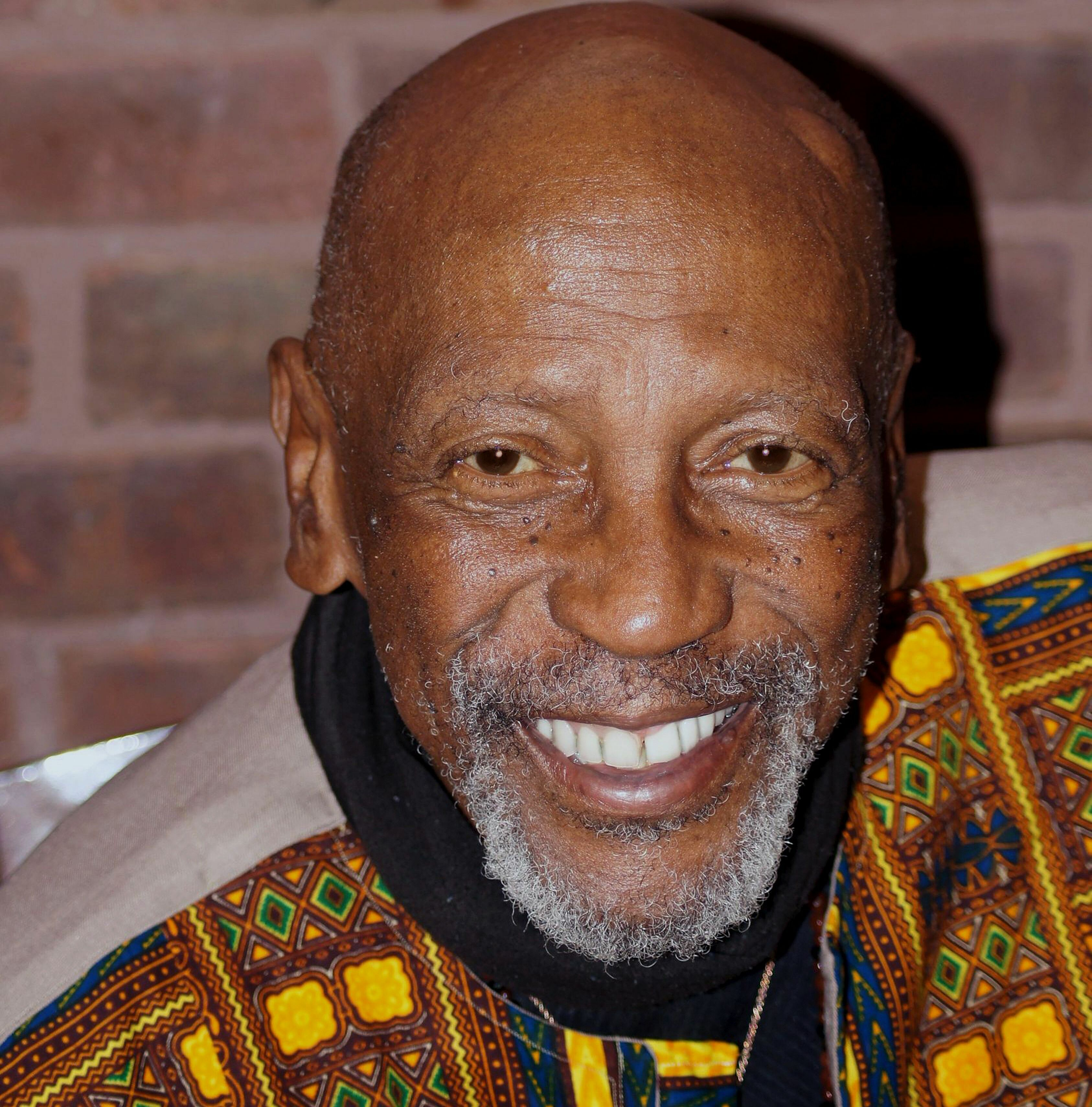
Louis Gossett Jr. won for An Officer and a Gentleman (1982); first black winner for this category.

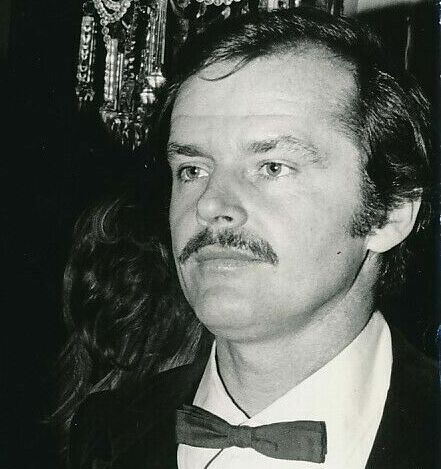
Jack Nicholson won for Terms of Endearment (1983).

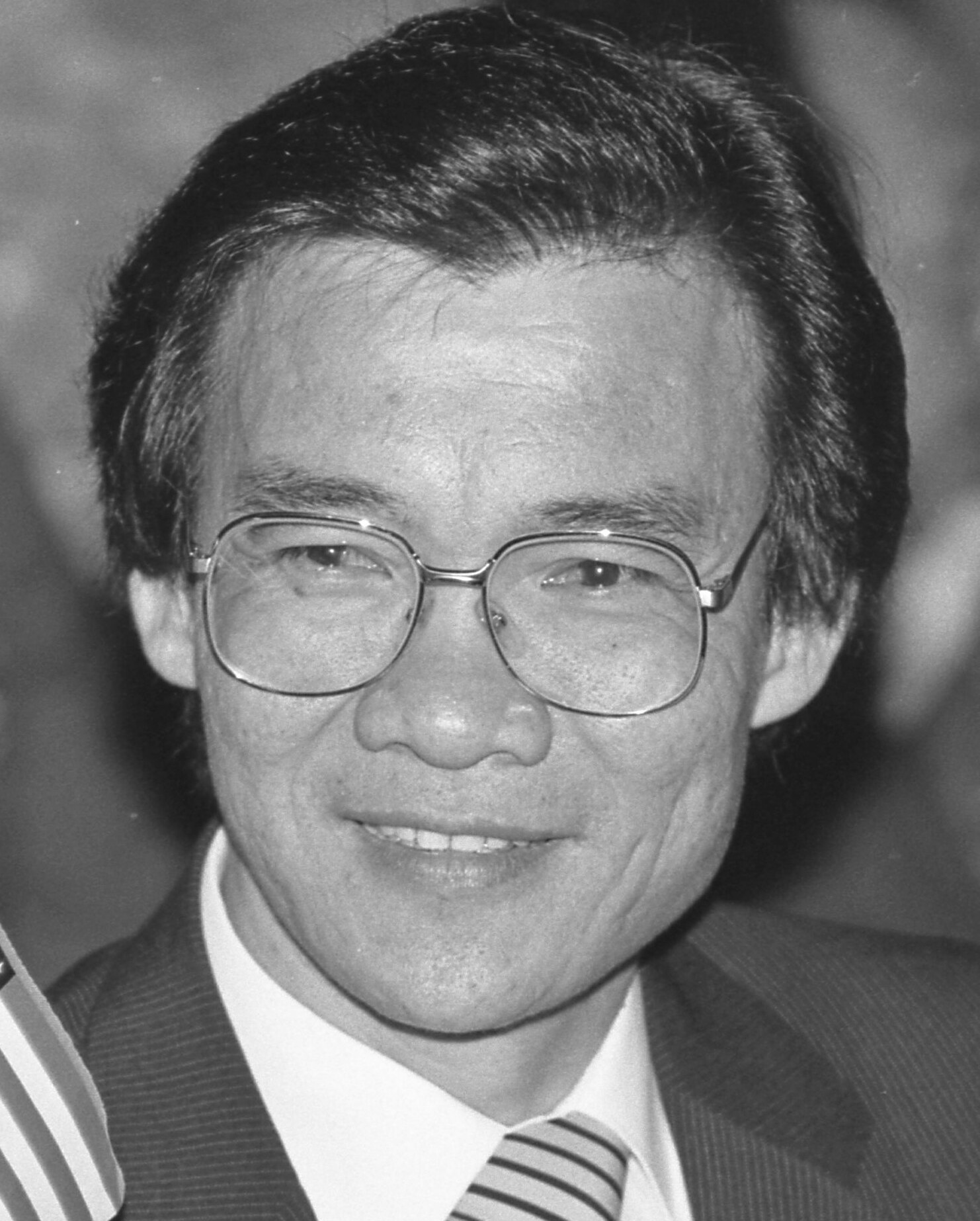
Haing S. Ngor won for The Killing Fields (1984); first Asian to win in the category.

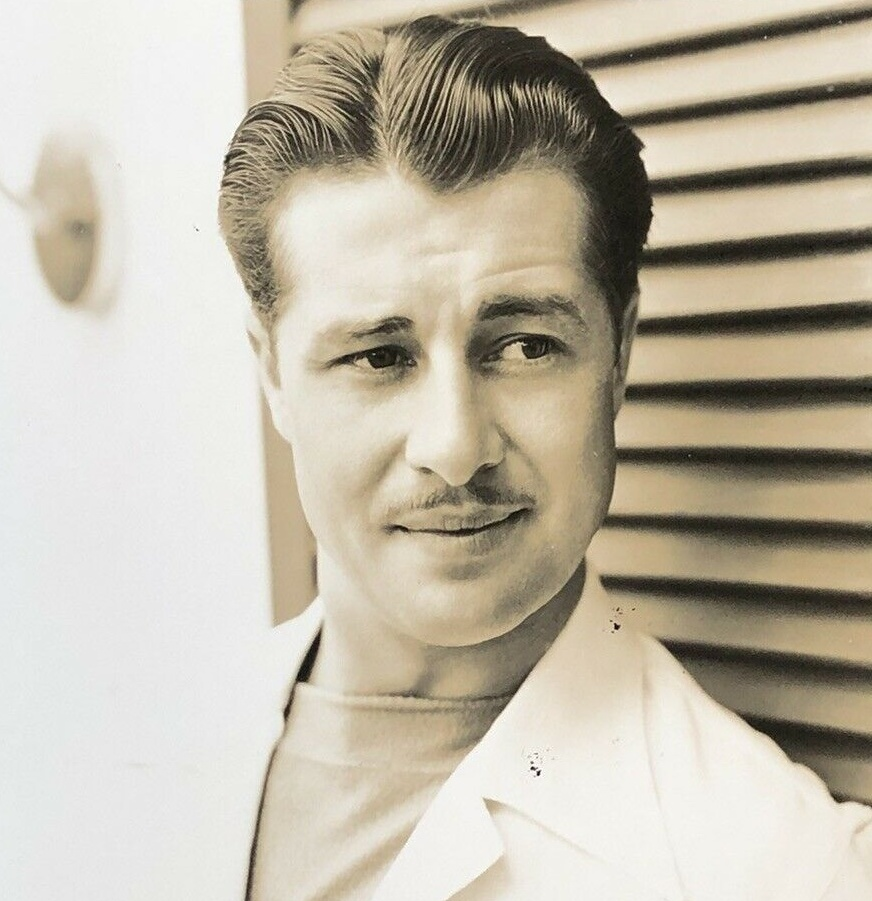
Don Ameche won for Cocoon (1985).

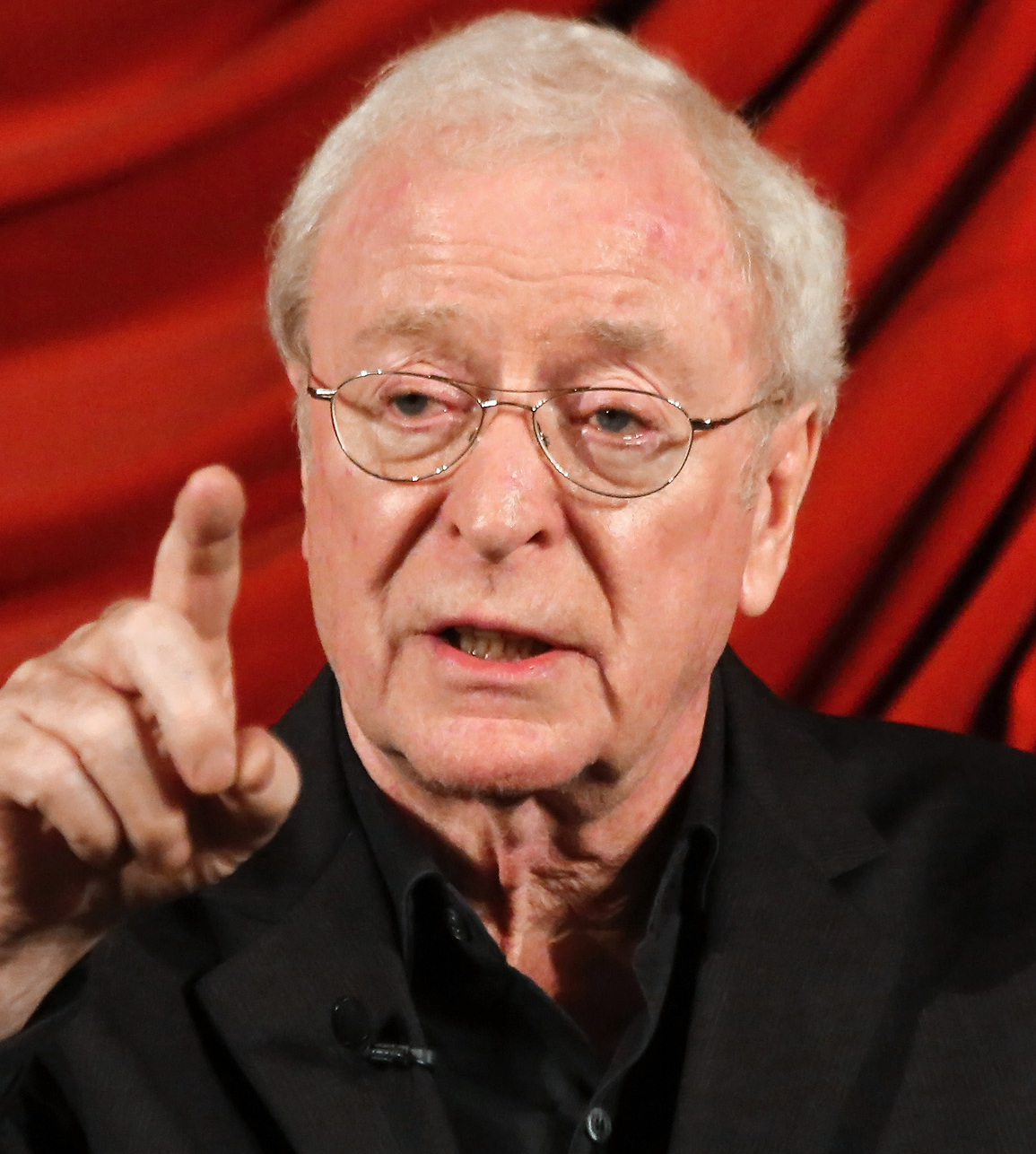
Michael Caine won twice, for Hannah and Her Sisters (1986) and The Cider House Rules (1999).

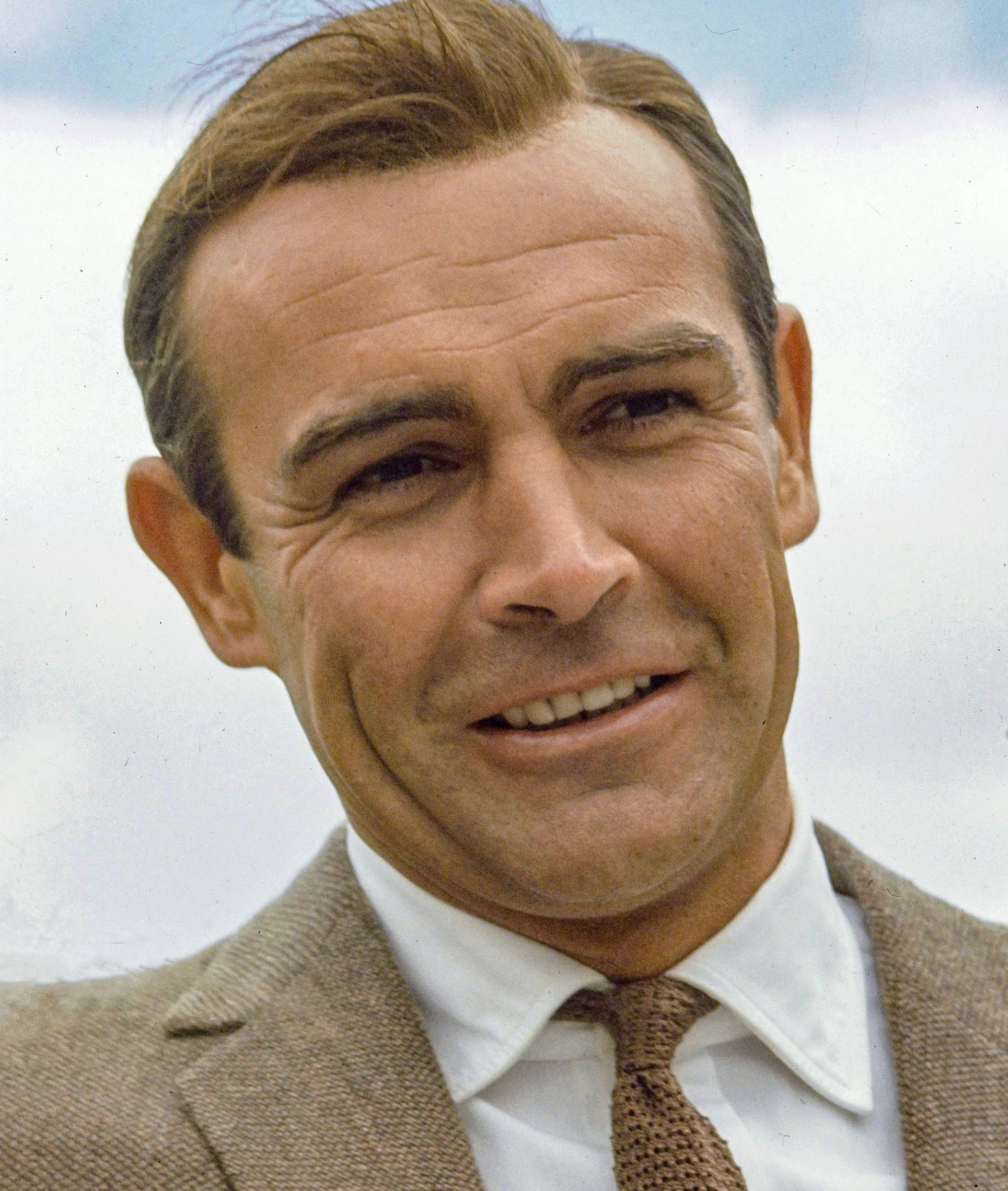
Sean Connery won for The Untouchables (1987).

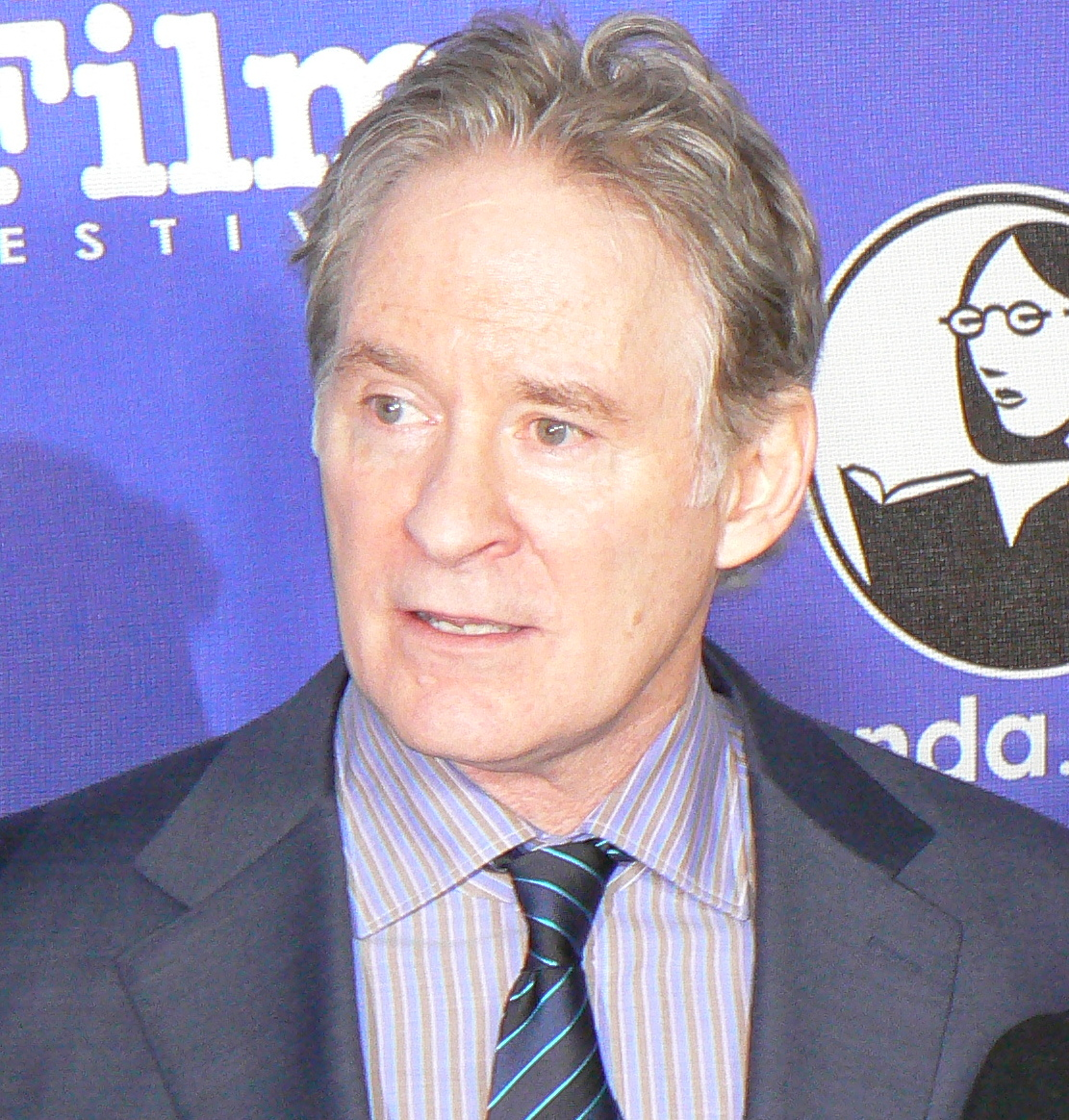
Kevin Kline won for A Fish Called Wanda (1988).

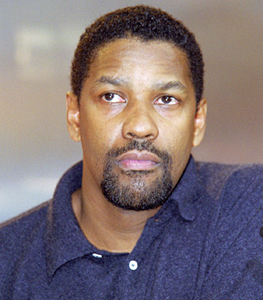
Denzel Washington won for Glory (1989).

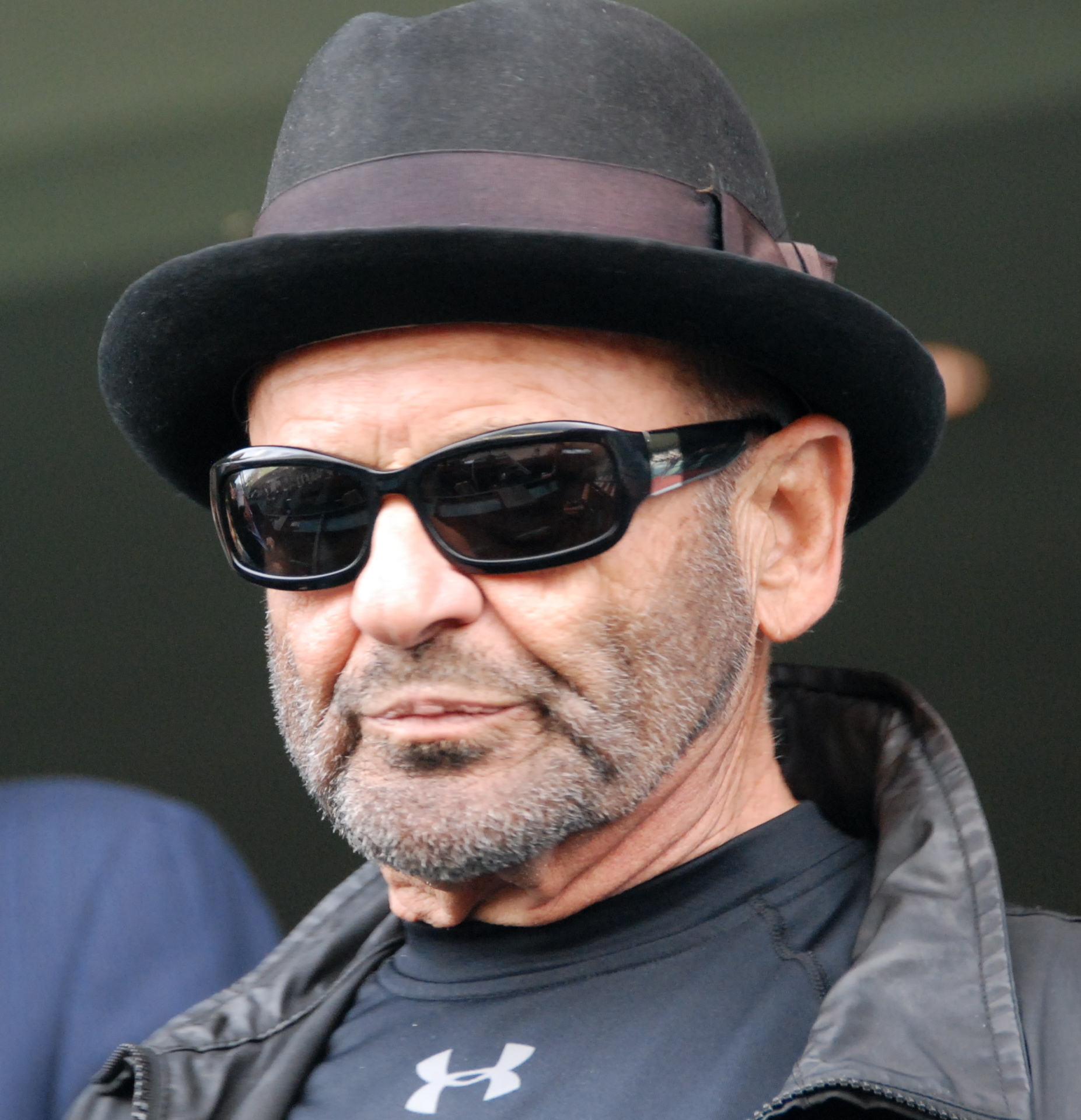
Joe Pesci won for GoodFellas (1990).

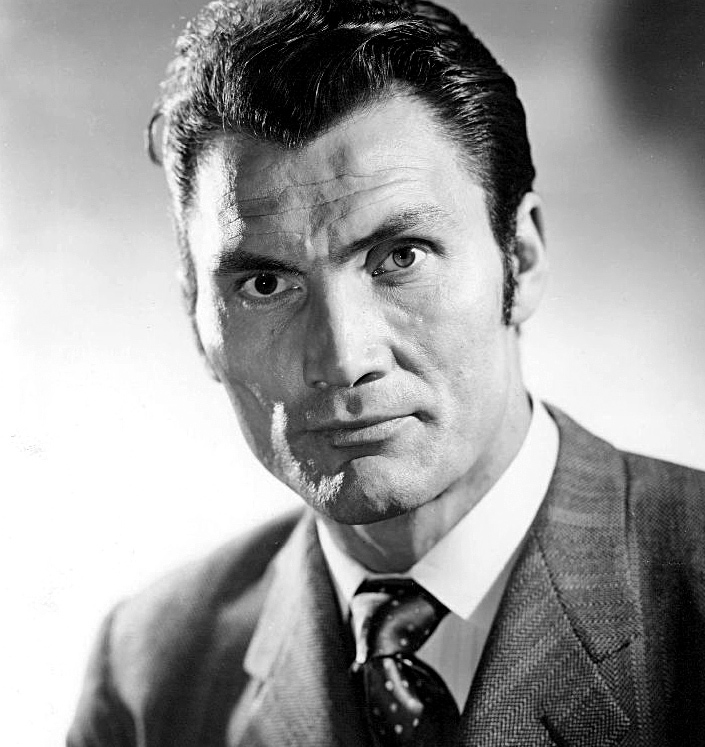
Jack Palance won for City Slickers (1991).

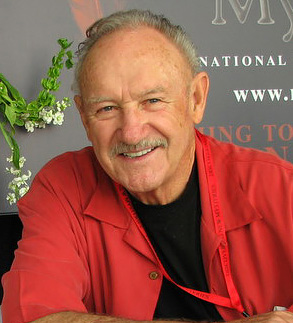
Gene Hackman won for Unforgiven (1992).

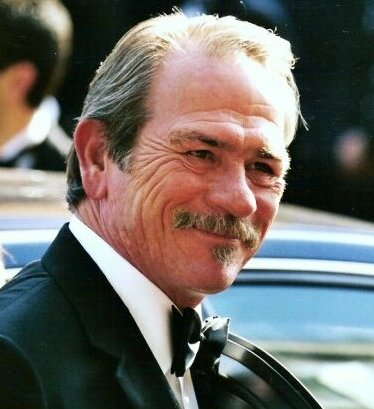
Tommy Lee Jones won for The Fugitive (1993).

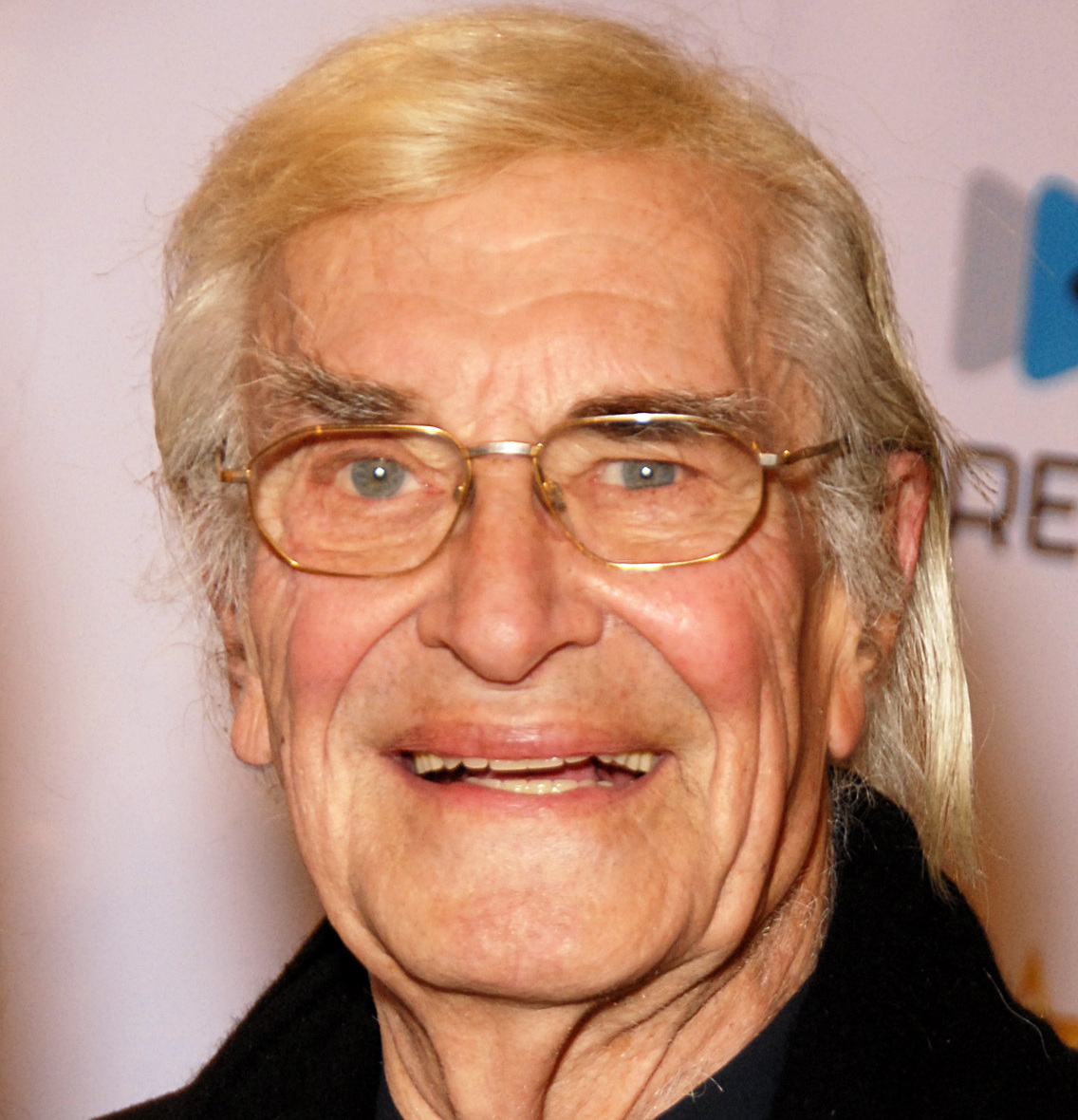
Martin Landau won for Ed Wood (1994).

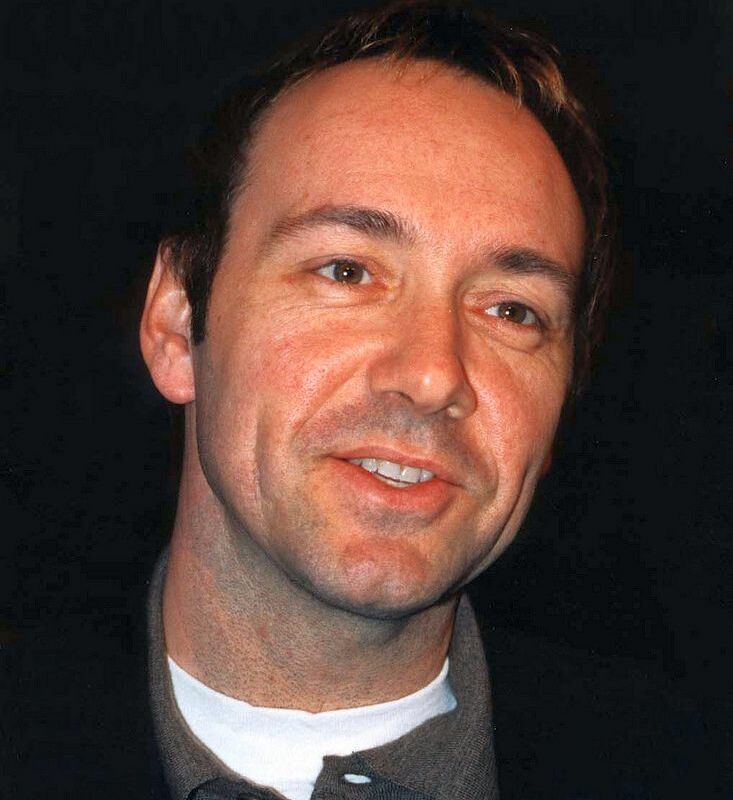
Kevin Spacey won for The Usual Suspects (1995).

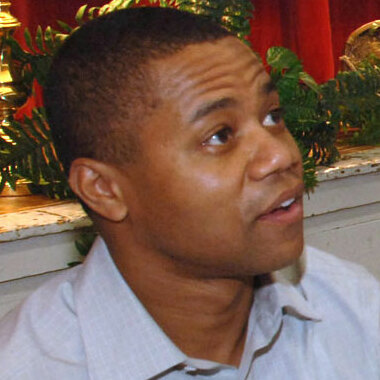
Cuba Gooding Jr. won for Jerry Maguire (1996).

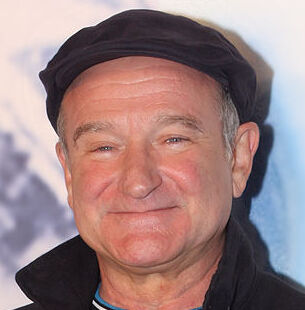
Robin Williams won for Good Will Hunting (1997).

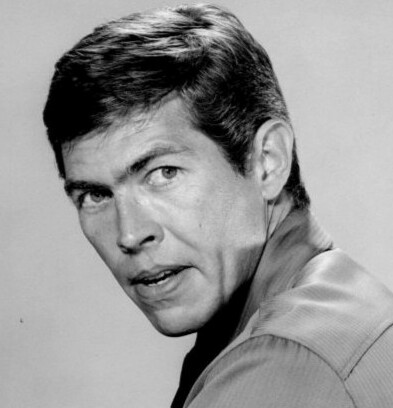
James Coburn won for Affliction (1998).

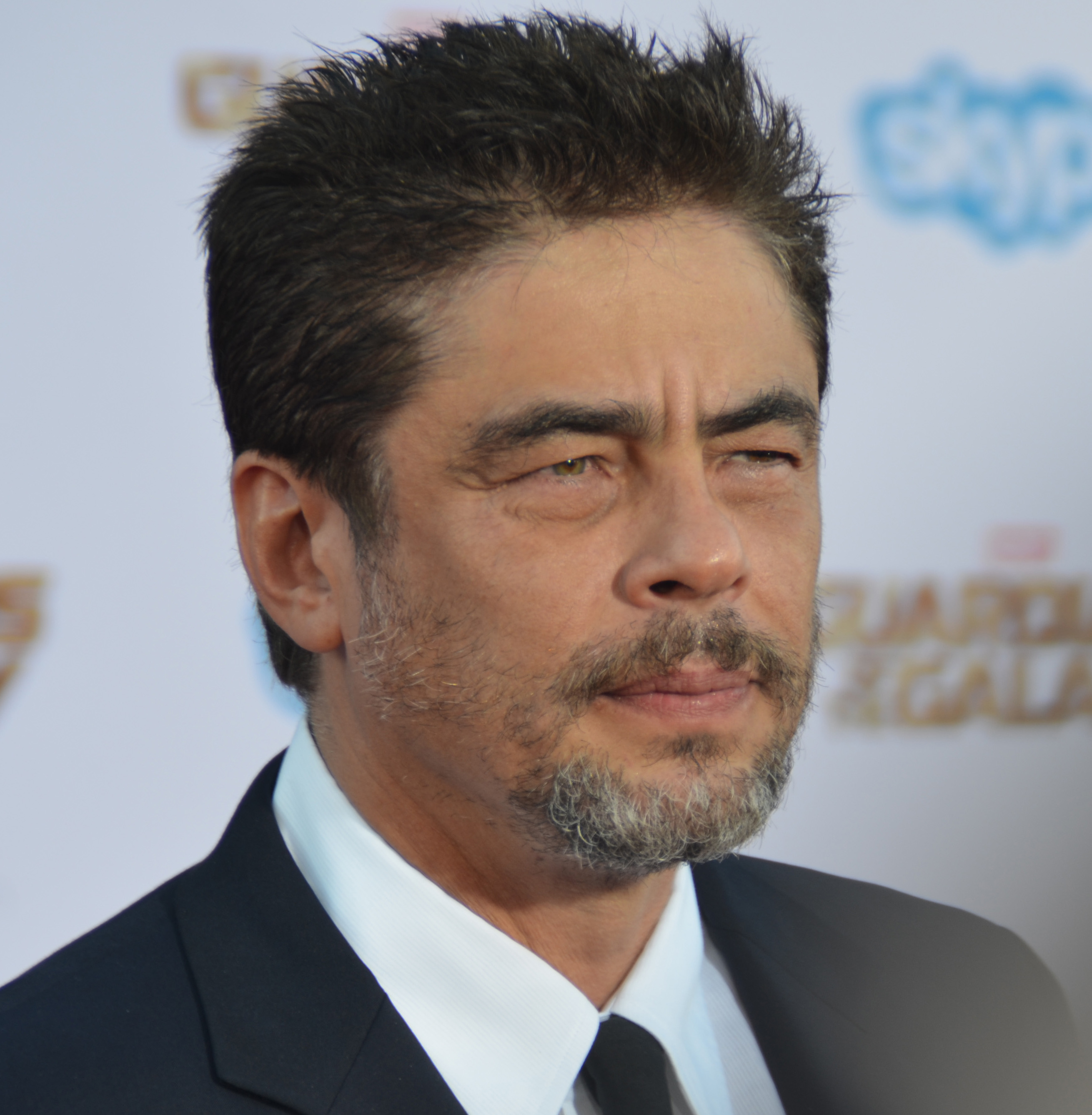
Benicio del Toro won for Traffic (2000); first Spanish-language performance to win.

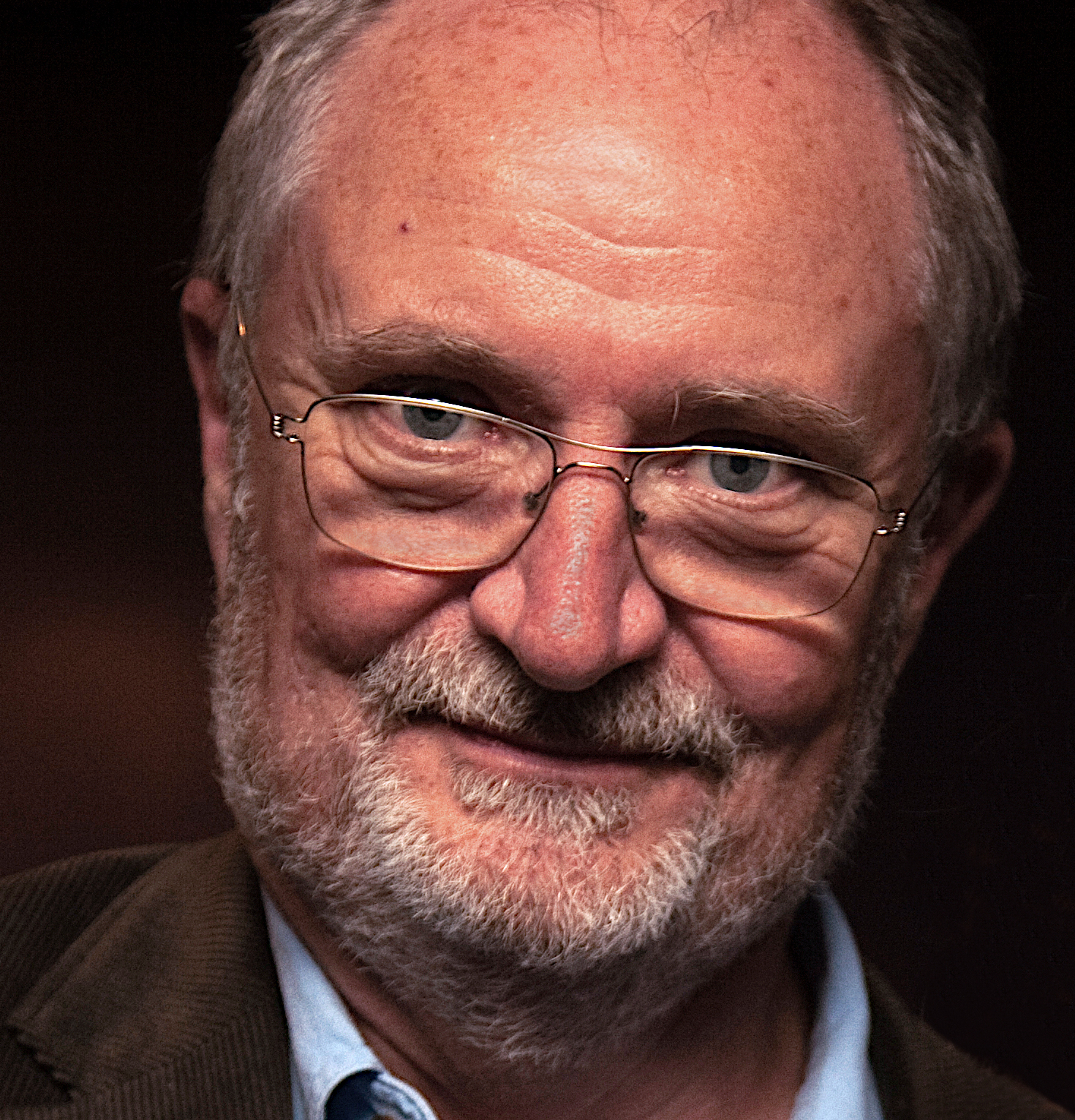
Jim Broadbent won for Iris (2001).

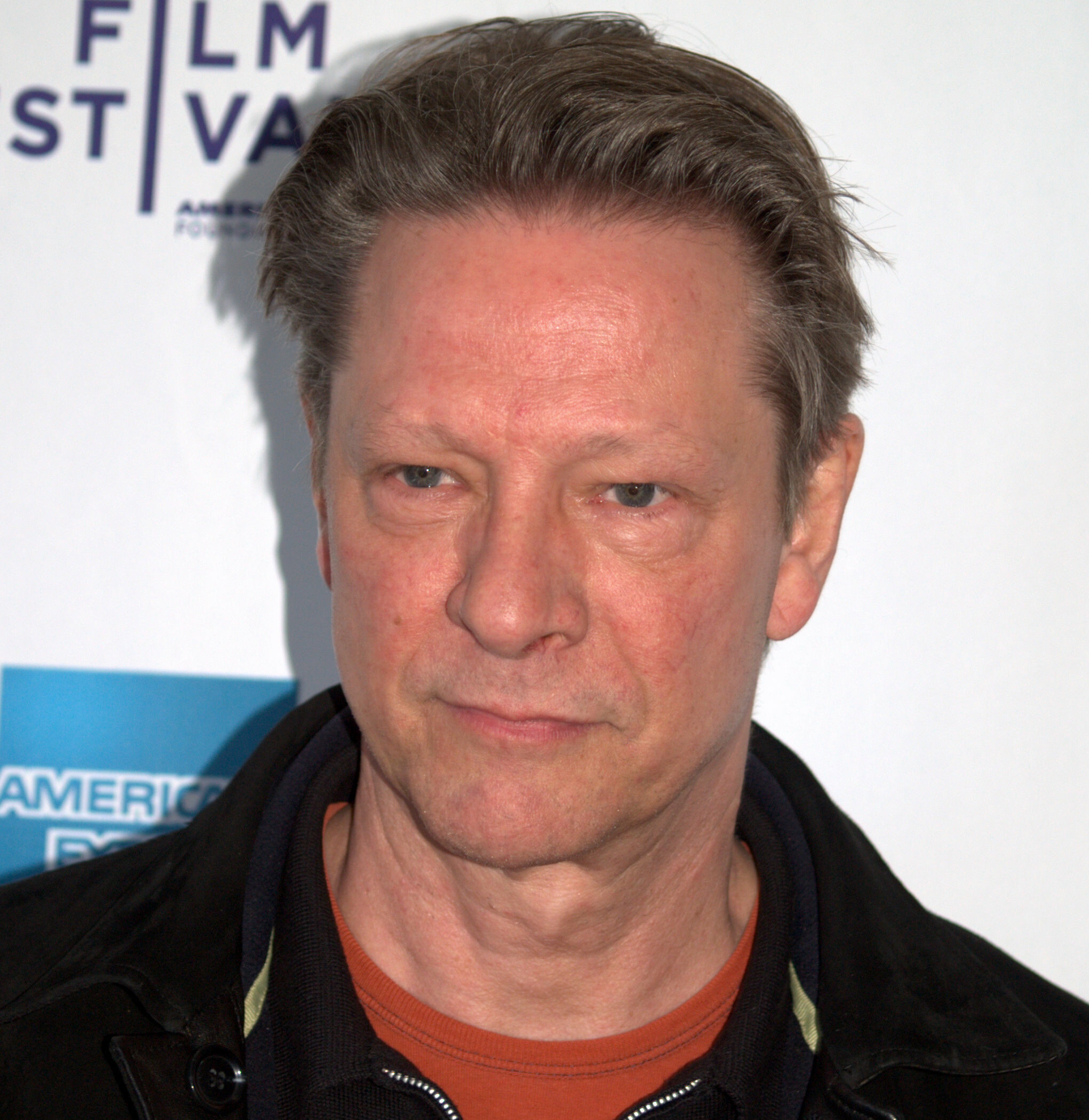
Chris Cooper won for Adaptation. (2002).

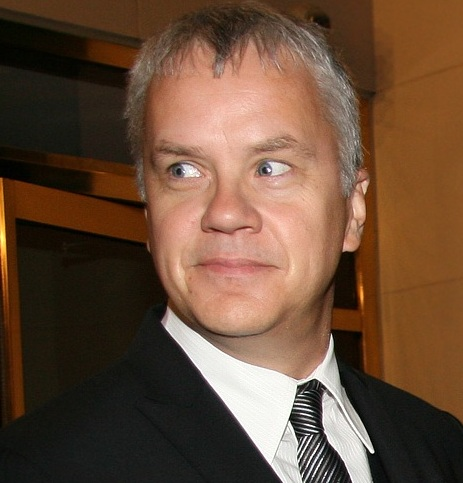
Tim Robbins won for Mystic River (2003).

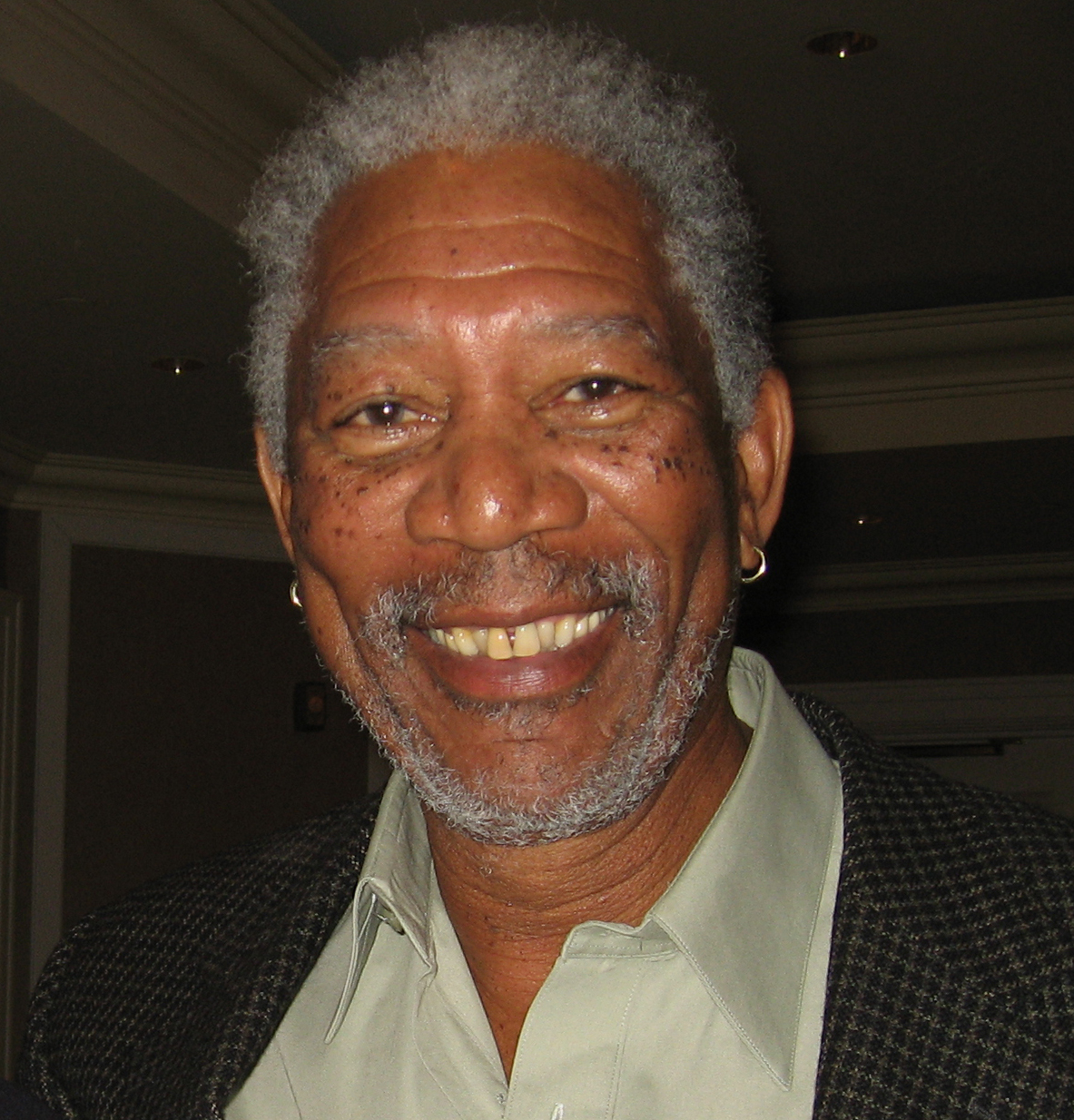
Morgan Freeman won for Million Dollar Baby (2004).

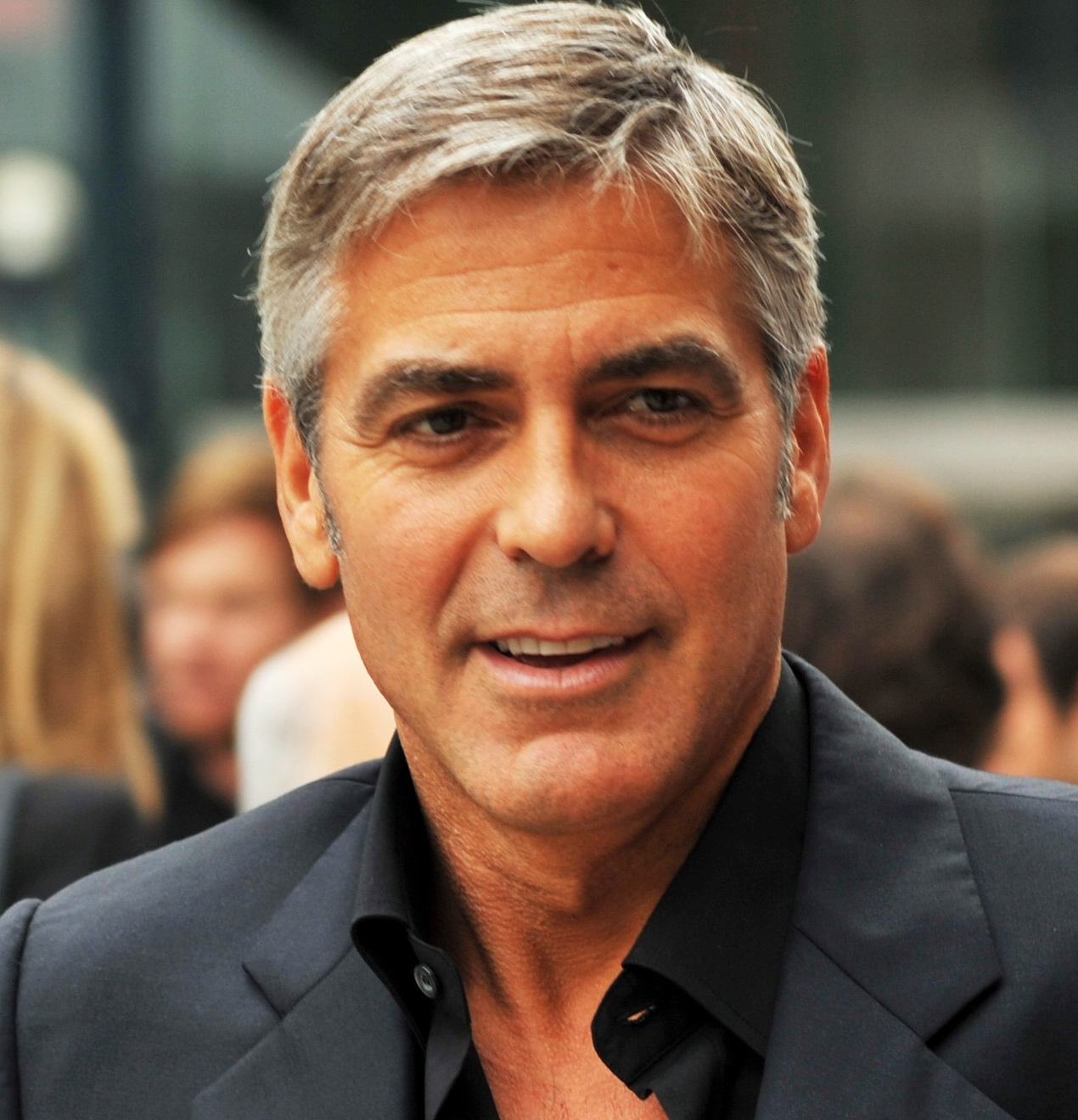
George Clooney won for Syriana (2005).

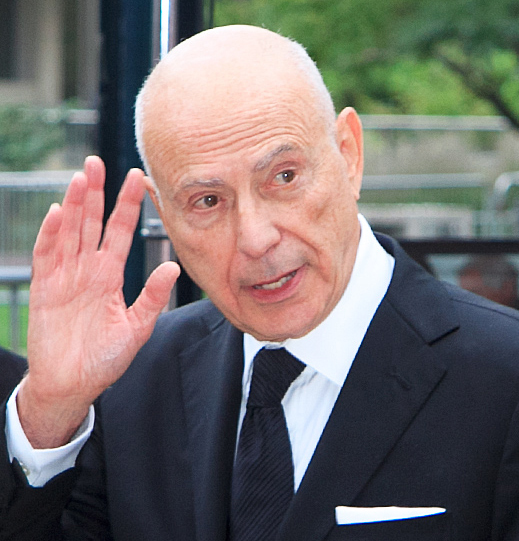
Alan Arkin won for Little Miss Sunshine (2006).

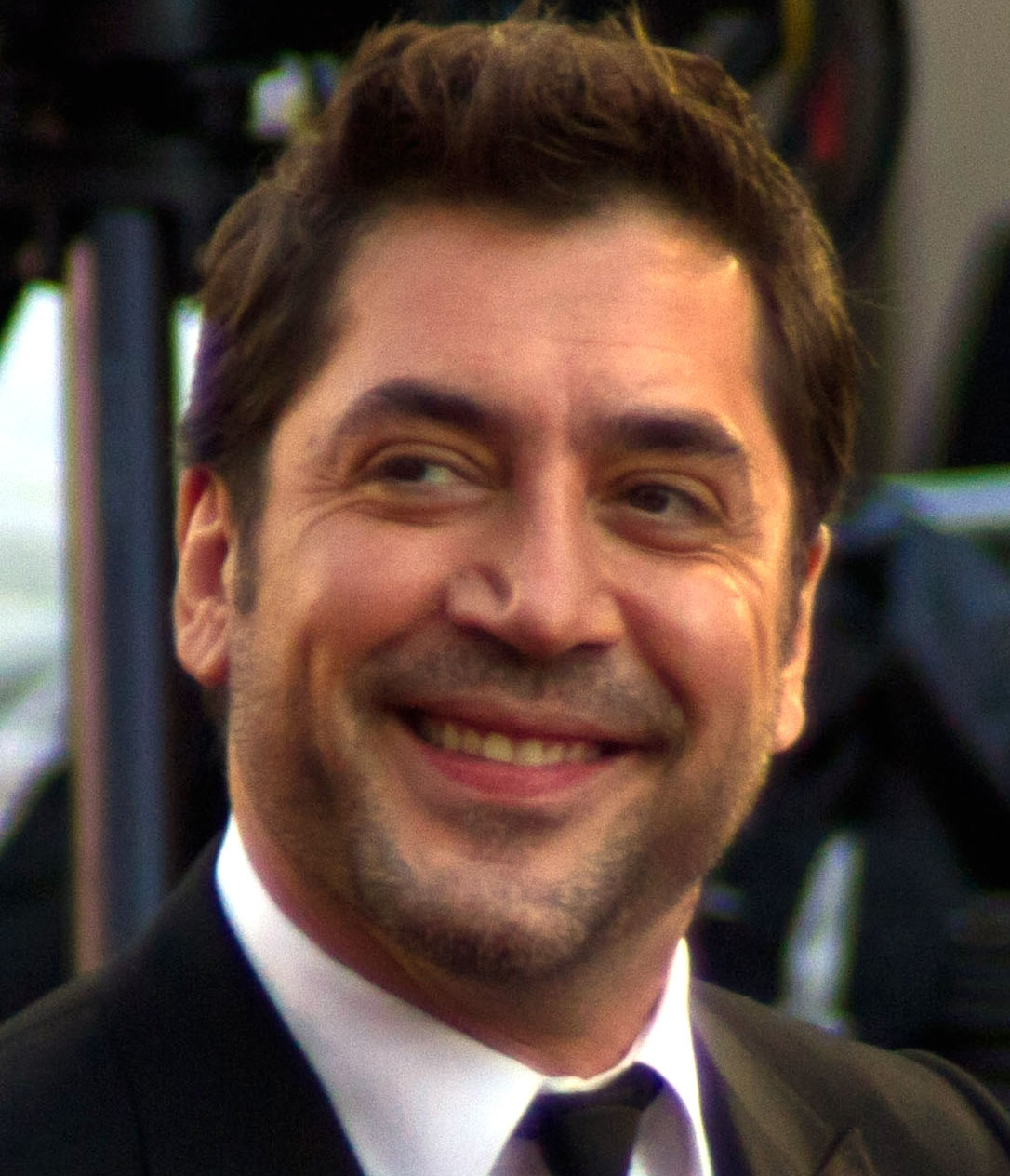
Javier Bardem won for No Country for Old Men (2007).

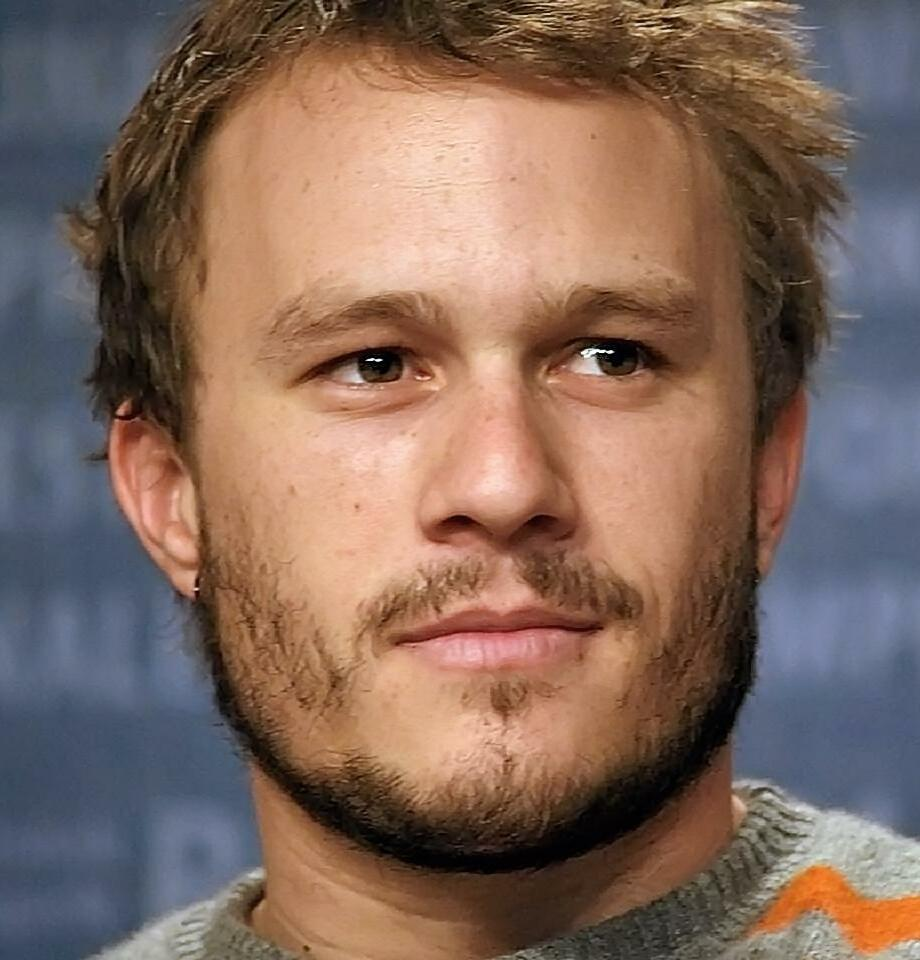
Heath Ledger won for The Dark Knight (2008); category's first posthumous win, and the first ever for a comic book role.

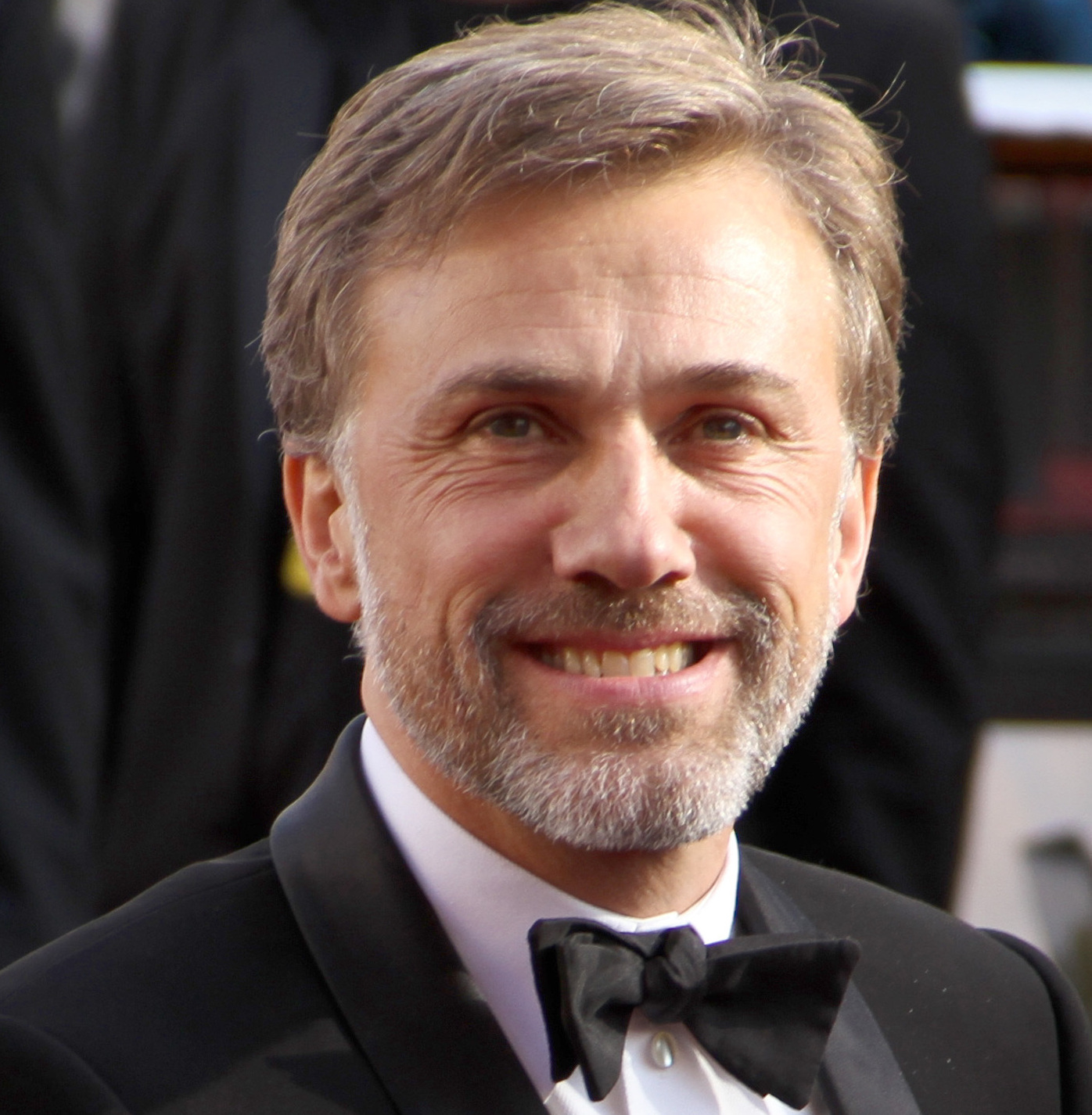
Christoph Waltz won twice, for Inglourious Basterds (2009) and Django Unchained (2012).

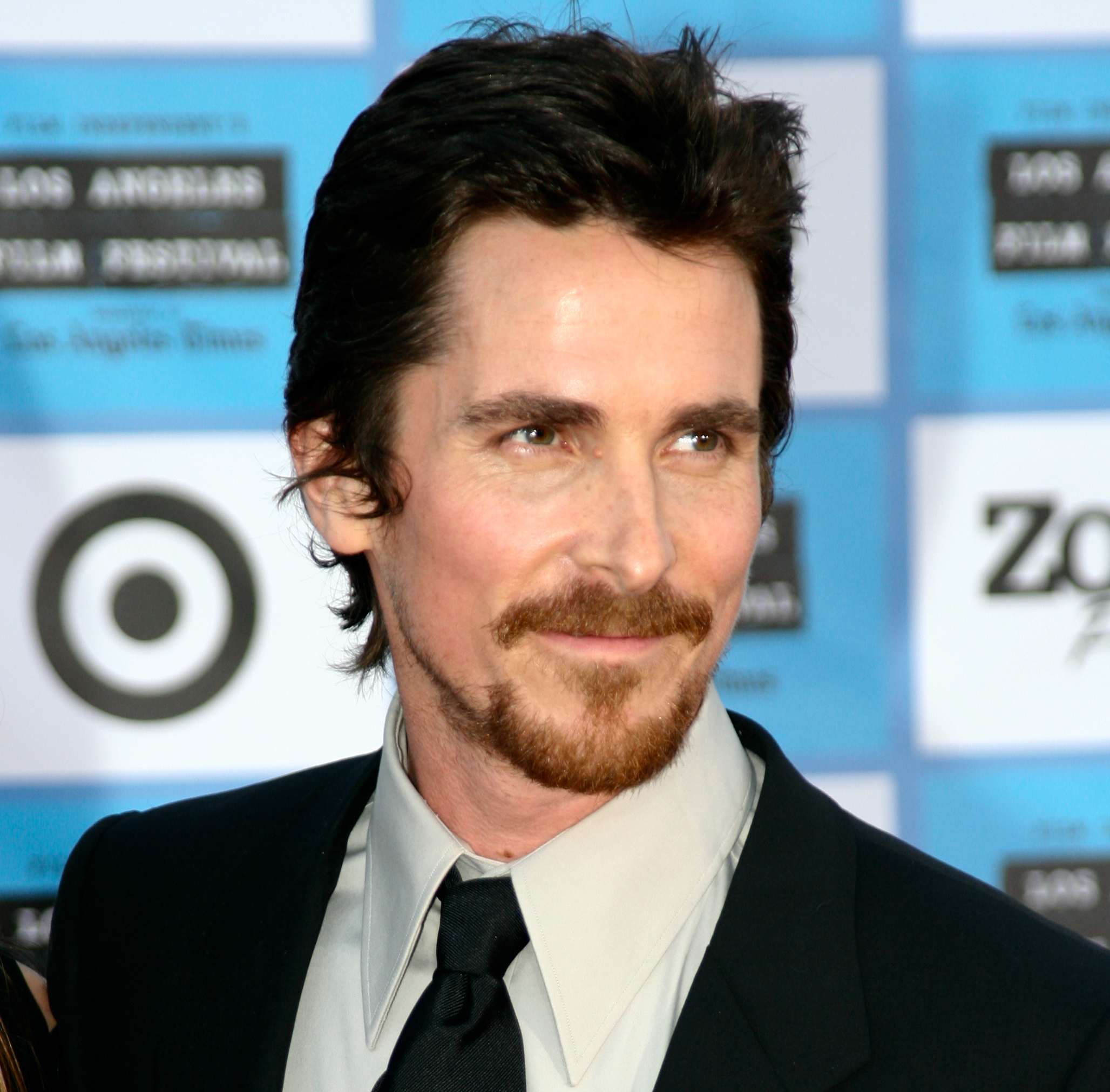
Christian Bale won for The Fighter (2010).

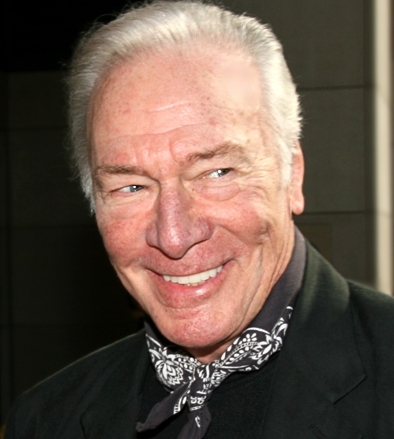
Christopher Plummer won for Beginners (2011); this category's oldest winner, at age 82.

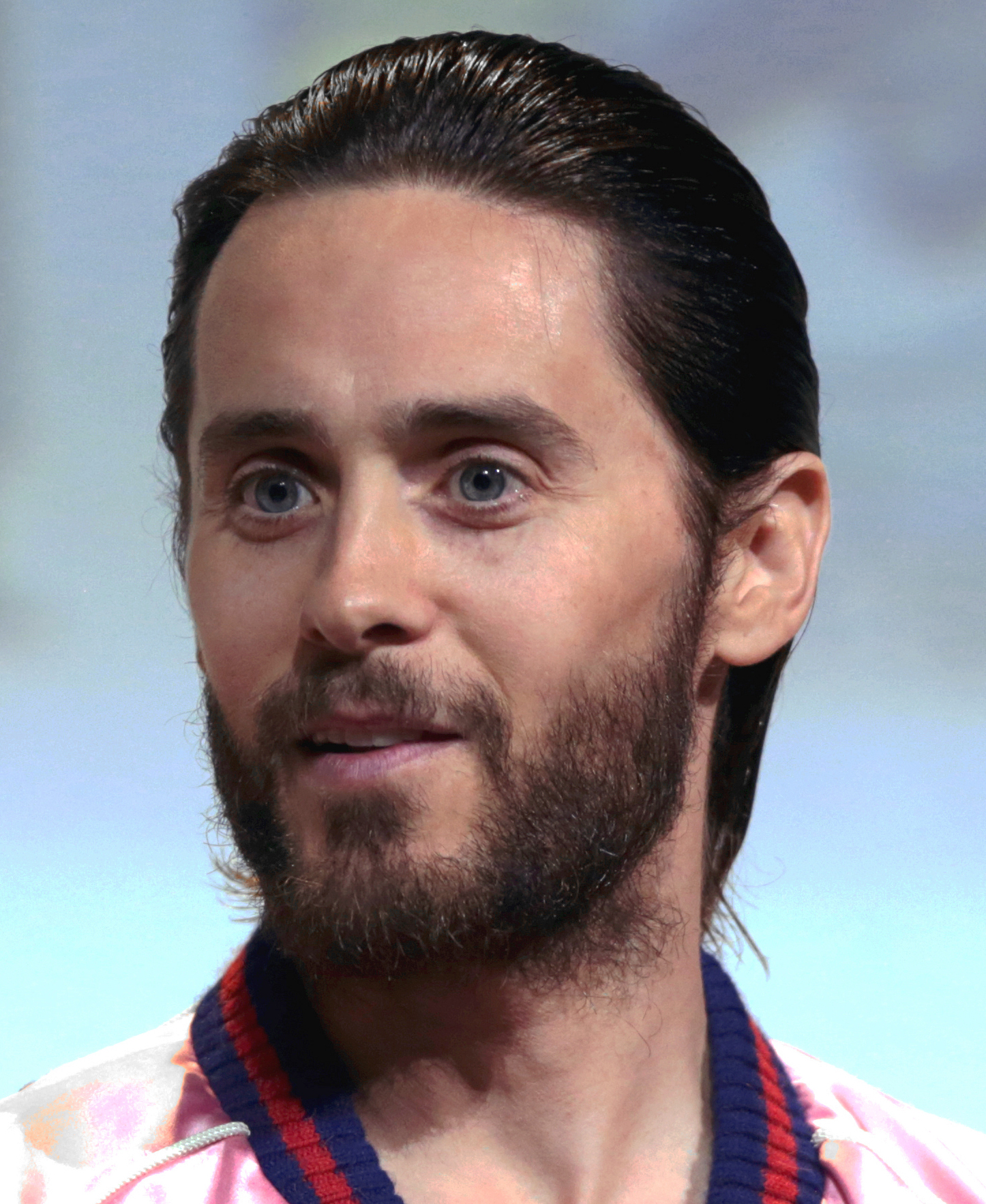
Jared Leto won for Dallas Buyers Club (2013).

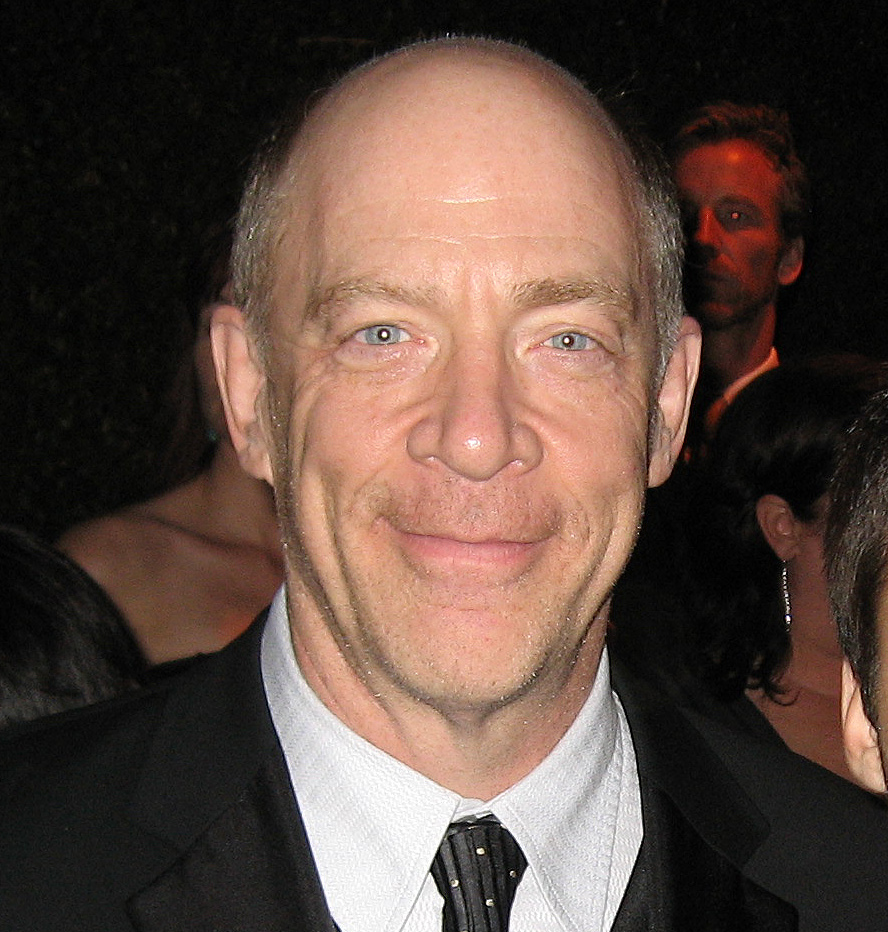
J. K. Simmons won for Whiplash (2014).

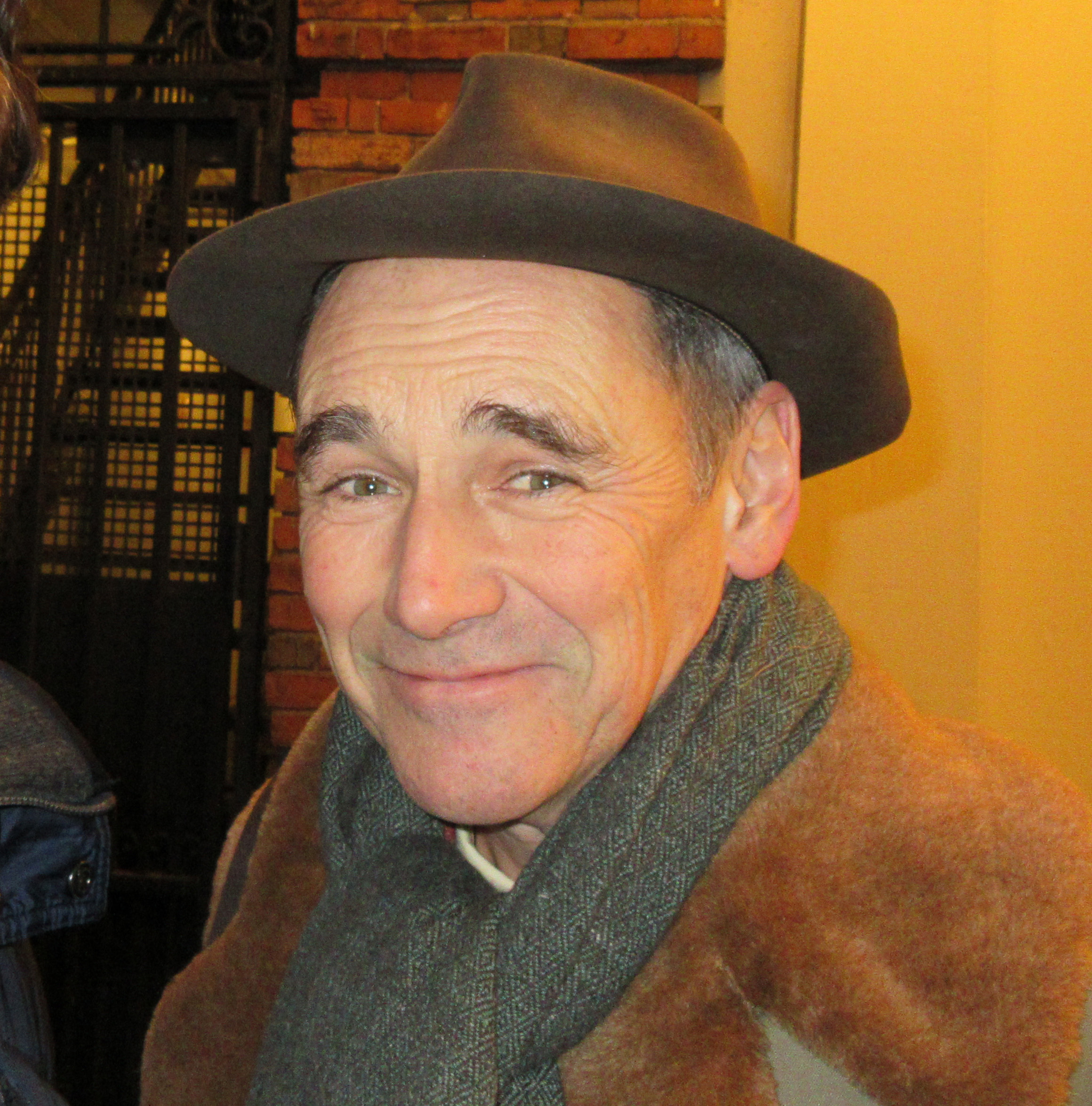
Mark Rylance won for Bridge of Spies (2015).

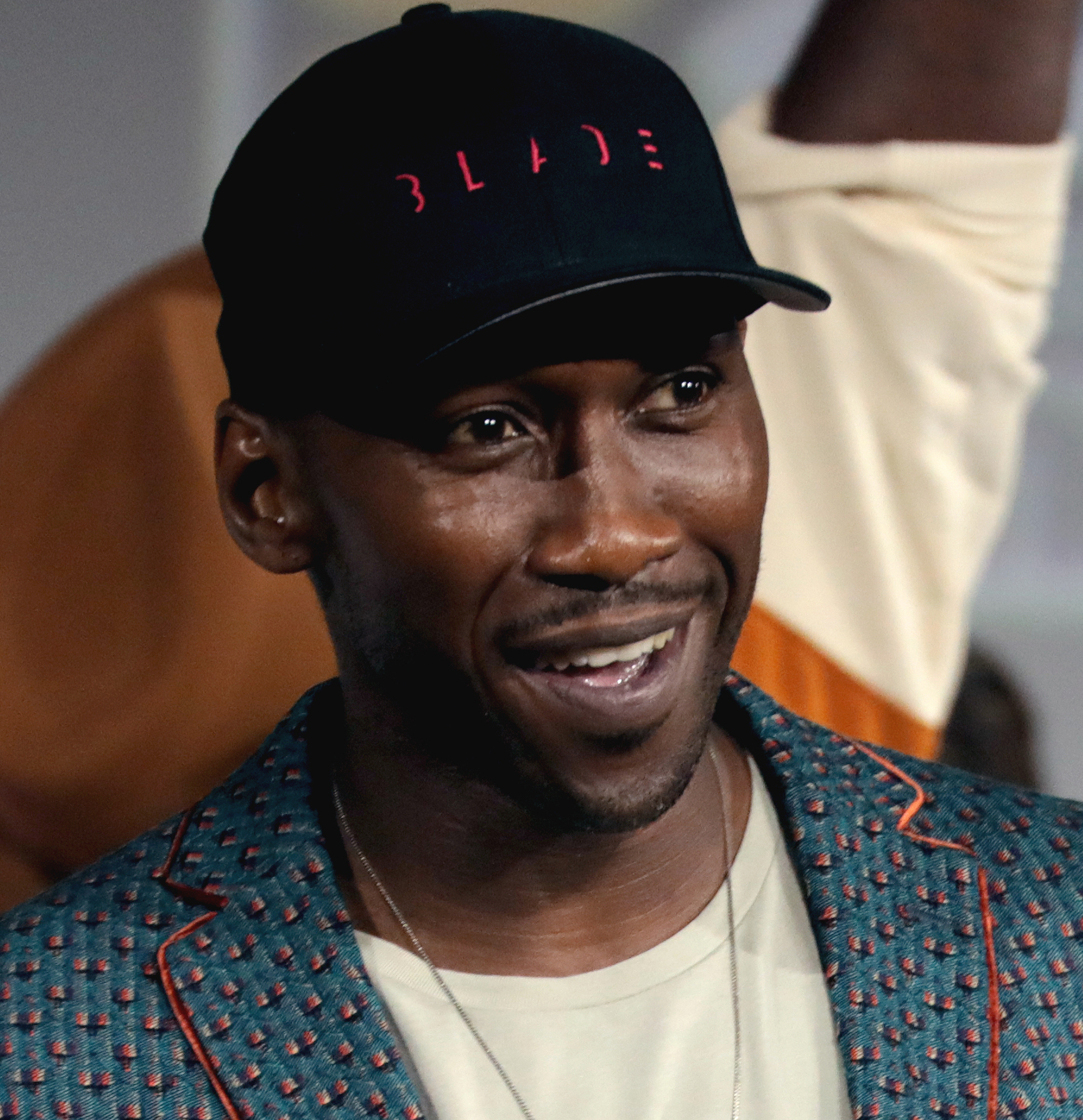
Mahershala Ali won twice, for Moonlight (2016) and Green Book (2018).

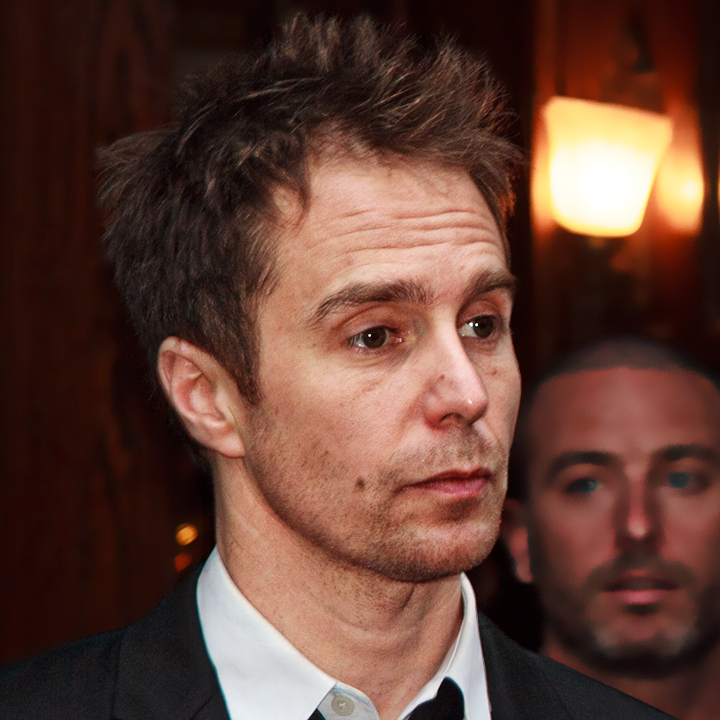
Sam Rockwell won for Three Billboards Outside Ebbing, Missouri (2017).

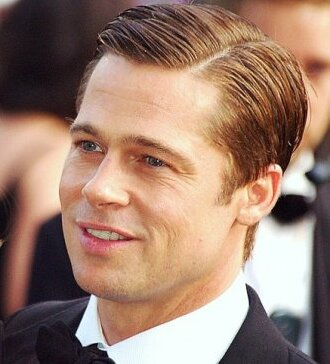
Brad Pitt won for Once Upon a Time in Hollywood (2019).

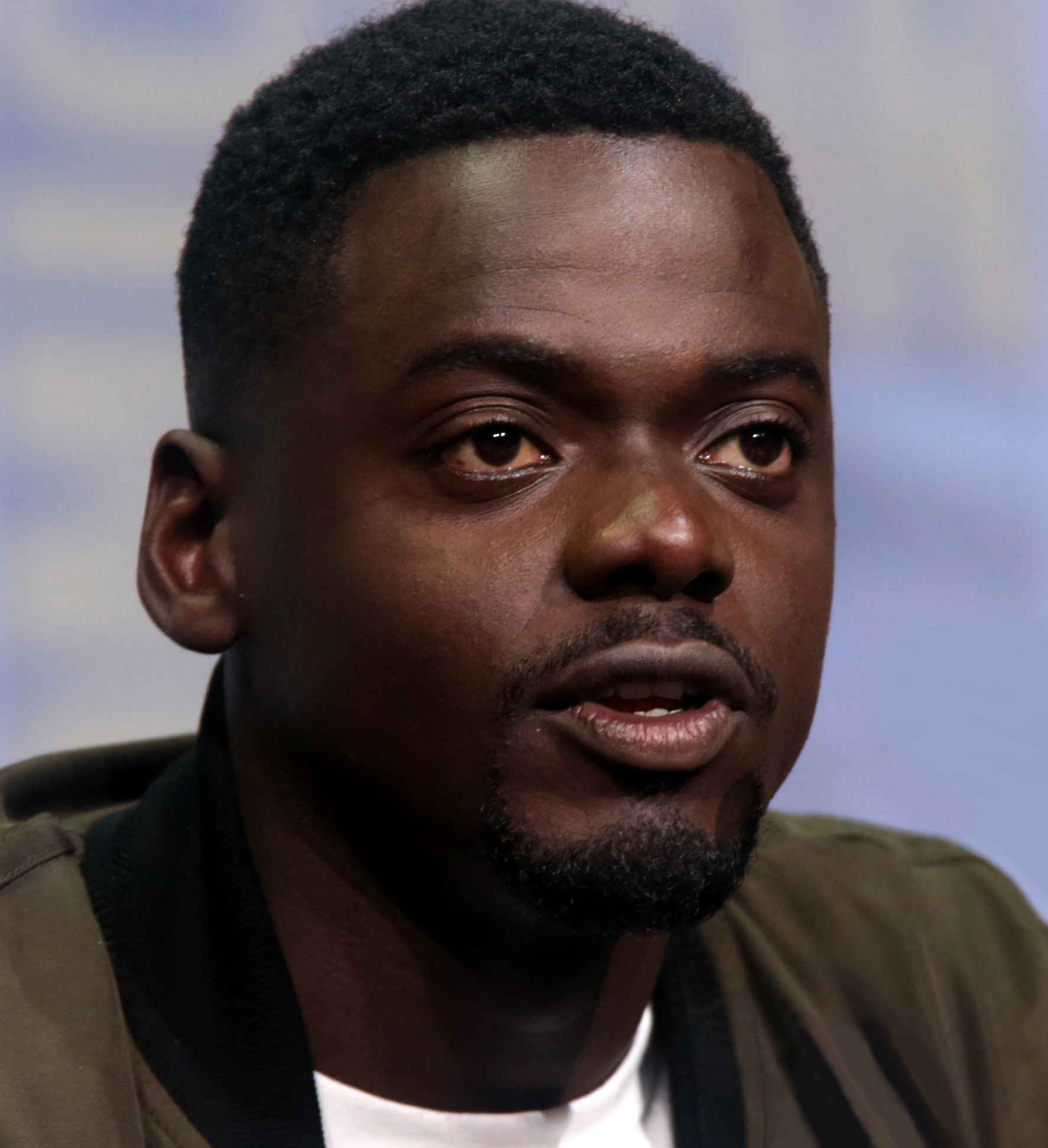
Daniel Kaluuya won for Judas and the Black Messiah (2021).

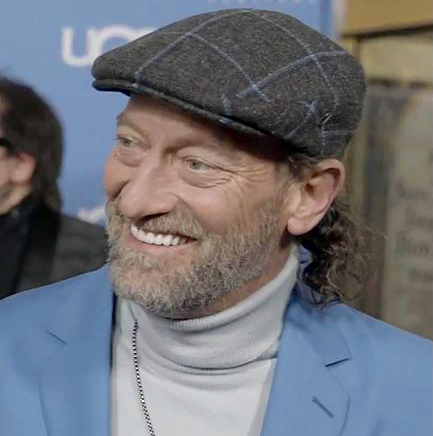
Troy Kotsur won for CODA (2021); first deaf male win.

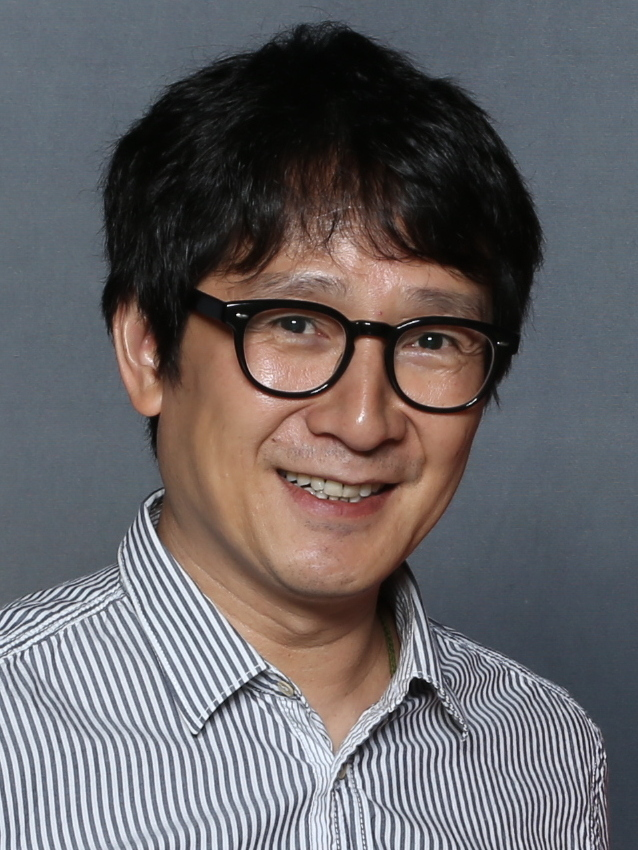
Ke Huy Quan won for Everything Everywhere All At Once (2022).

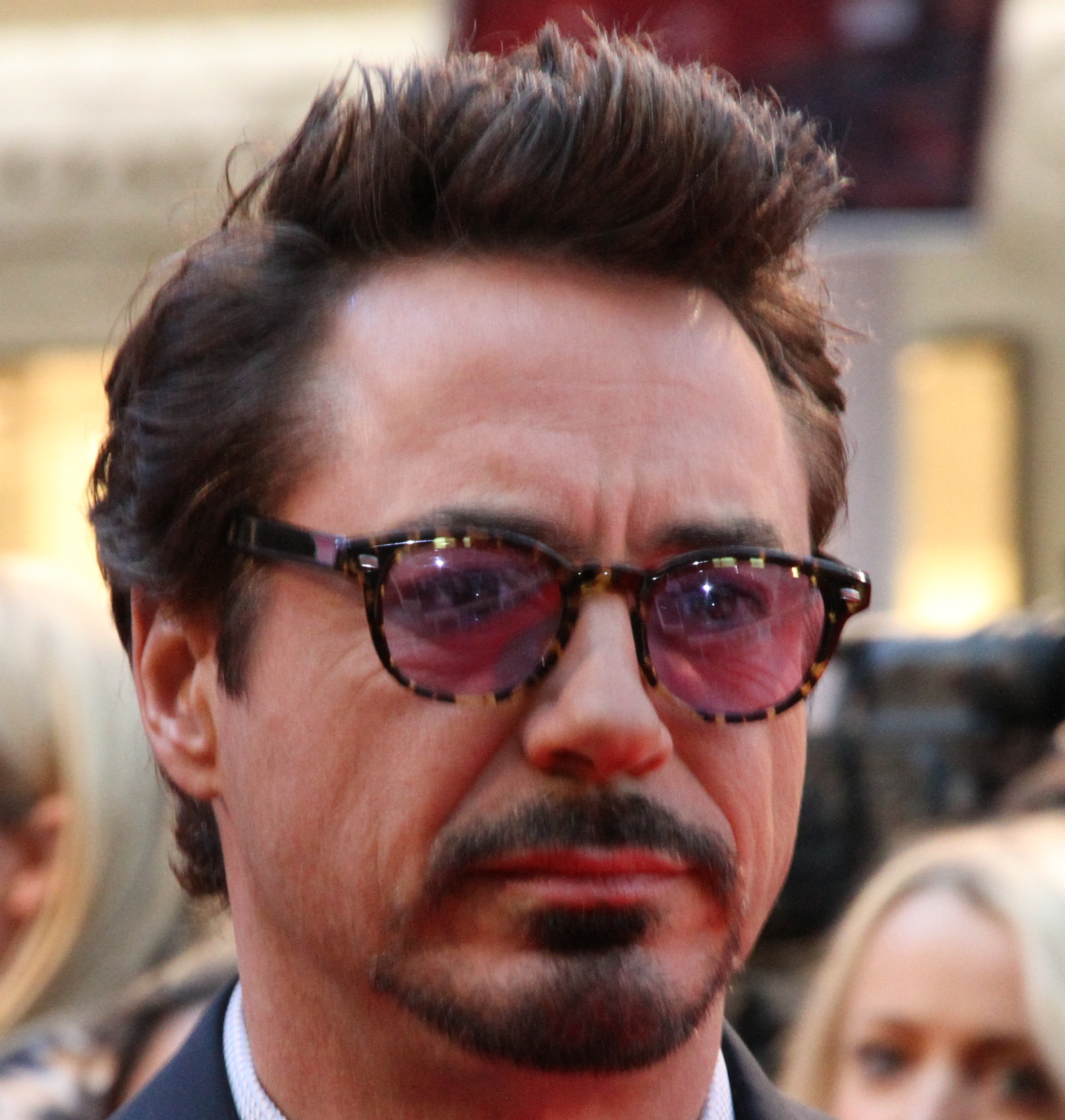
Robert Downey Jr. won for Oppenheimer (2023).

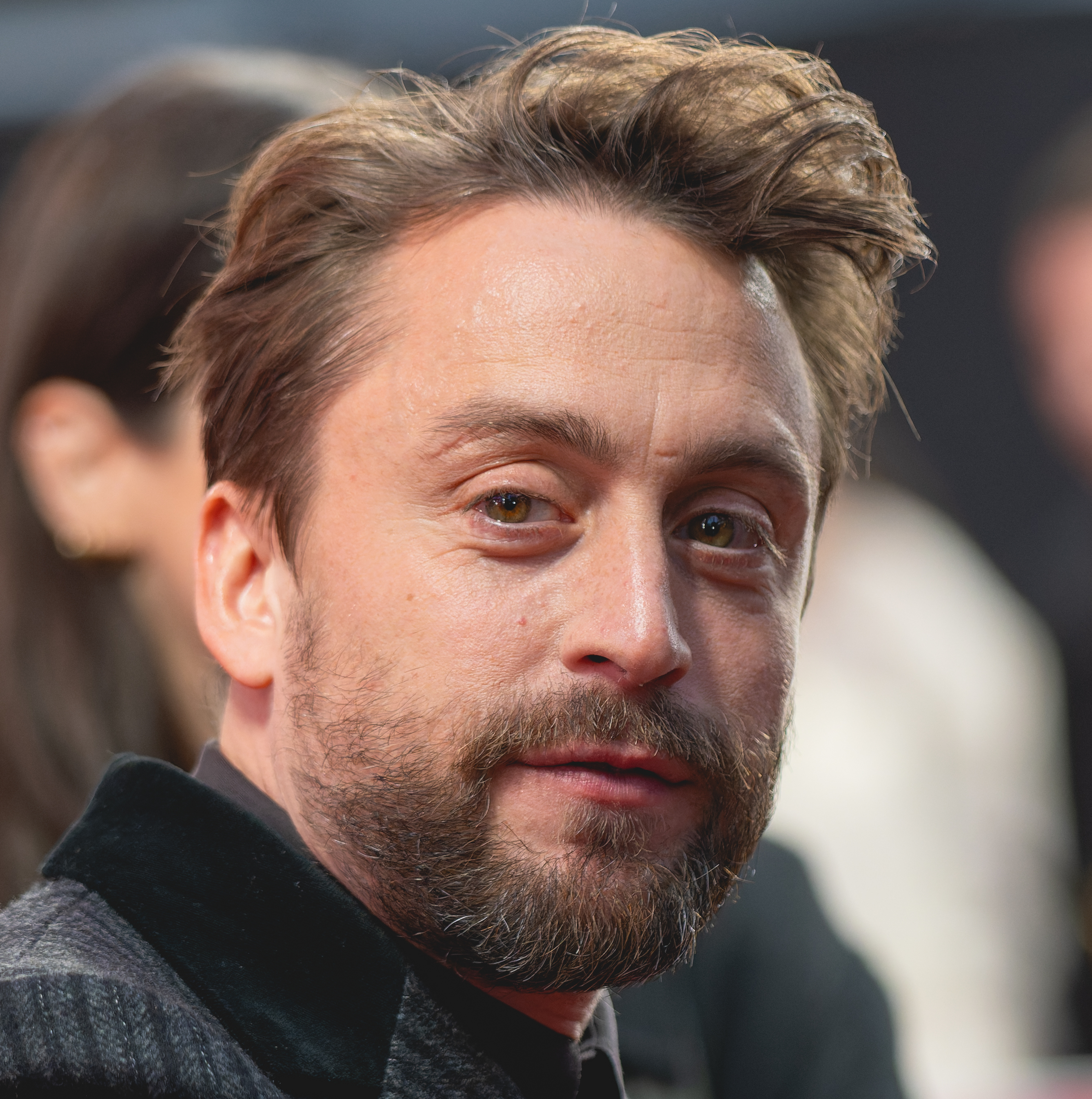
Kieran Culkin won for A Real Pain (2024).

== Winners and nominees ==
In the following table, the years are listed as per Academy convention, and generally correspond to the year of film release in Los Angeles County; the ceremonies are always held the following year. For the first five ceremonies, the eligibility period spanned twelve months, from August 1 to July 31. For the 6th ceremony held in 1934, the eligibility period lasted from August 1, 1932, to December 31, 1933. Since the 7th ceremony held in 1935, the period of eligibility became the full previous calendar year from January 1 to December 31.

Table key
‡	Indicates the winner
†	Indicates a posthumous winner
†	Indicates a posthumous nominee
§	Indicates actor who refused the nomination

=== 1930s ===
Year	Actor	Role(s)	Film	Ref.
1936 (9th)	Walter Brennan ‡	Swan Bostrom	Come and Get It	
1936 (9th)	Mischa Auer	Carlo	My Man Godfrey	
1936 (9th)	Stuart Erwin	Amos Dodd	Pigskin Parade	
1936 (9th)	Basil Rathbone	Tybalt	Romeo and Juliet	
1936 (9th)	Akim Tamiroff	General Yang	The General Died at Dawn	
1937 (10th)	Joseph Schildkraut ‡	Captain Alfred Dreyfus	The Life of Emile Zola	
1937 (10th)	Ralph Bellamy	Dan Leeson	The Awful Truth	
1937 (10th)	Thomas Mitchell	Dr. Kersaint	The Hurricane	
1937 (10th)	H. B. Warner	Chang	Lost Horizon	
1937 (10th)	Roland Young	Cosmo Topper	Topper	
1938 (11th)	Walter Brennan ‡	Peter Goodwin	Kentucky	
1938 (11th)	John Garfield	Mickey Borden	Four Daughters	
1938 (11th)	Gene Lockhart	Regis	Algiers	
1938 (11th)	Robert Morley	King Louis XVI	Marie Antoinette	
1938 (11th)	Basil Rathbone	King Louis XI	If I Were King	
1939 (12th)	Thomas Mitchell ‡	Dr. Josiah Boone	Stagecoach	
1939 (12th)	Brian Aherne	Emperor Maximilian von Habsburg	Juarez	
1939 (12th)	Harry Carey Sr.	President of the Senate	Mr. Smith Goes to Washington	
1939 (12th)	Brian Donlevy	Sgt. Markoff	Beau Geste	
1939 (12th)	Claude Rains	Sen. Joseph Harrison Paine	Mr. Smith Goes to Washington	

=== 1940s ===
Year	Actor	Role(s)	Film	Ref.
1940 (13th)	Walter Brennan ‡	Judge Roy Bean	The Westerner	
1940 (13th)	Albert Bassermann	Van Meer	Foreign Correspondent	
1940 (13th)	William Gargan	Joe	They Knew What They Wanted	
1940 (13th)	Jack Oakie	Benzino Napaloni (Dictator of Bacteria)	The Great Dictator	
1940 (13th)	James Stephenson	Howard Joyce	The Letter	
1941 (14th)	Donald Crisp ‡	Gwilym Morgan	How Green Was My Valley	
1941 (14th)	Walter Brennan	Pastor Rosier Pile	Sergeant York	
1941 (14th)	Charles Coburn	John P. Merrick	The Devil and Miss Jones	
1941 (14th)	James Gleason	Max Corkle	Here Comes Mr. Jordan	
1941 (14th)	Sydney Greenstreet	Kasper Gutman	The Maltese Falcon	
1942 (15th)	Van Heflin ‡	Jeff Hartnett	Johnny Eager	
1942 (15th)	William Bendix	Pvt. Aloysius "Smacksie" Randall	Wake Island	
1942 (15th)	Walter Huston	Jerry Cohan	Yankee Doodle Dandy	
1942 (15th)	Frank Morgan	The Pirate	Tortilla Flat	
1942 (15th)	Henry Travers	James Ballard	Mrs. Miniver	
1943 (16th)	Charles Coburn ‡	Benjamin Dingle	The More the Merrier	
1943 (16th)	Charles Bickford	Father Peyramale	The Song of Bernadette	
1943 (16th)	J. Carrol Naish	Giuseppe	Sahara	
1943 (16th)	Claude Rains	Capt. Louis Renault	Casablanca	
1943 (16th)	Akim Tamiroff	Pablo	For Whom the Bell Tolls	
1944 (17th)	Barry Fitzgerald ‡	Father Fitzgibbon	Going My Way (Note: Due to category confusion, Barry Fitzgerald received nominations in both lead actor and supporting for this same role, winning the latter award. To prevent this from occurring in the future, the Academy revised its rules so that if ever a single actor/actress was submitted in both categories for the same performance, they would only get nominated for whichever one had the higher overall percentage within that respective category.)	
1944 (17th)	Hume Cronyn	Paul Roeder	The Seventh Cross	
1944 (17th)	Claude Rains	Job Skeffington	Mr. Skeffington	
1944 (17th)	Clifton Webb	Waldo Lydecker	Laura	
1944 (17th)	Monty Woolley	Colonel William G. Smollett	Since You Went Away	
1945 (18th)	James Dunn ‡	Johnny Nolan	A Tree Grows in Brooklyn	
1945 (18th)	Michael Chekhov	Dr. Alexander "Alex" Brulov	Spellbound	
1945 (18th)	John Dall	Morgan Evans	The Corn Is Green	
1945 (18th)	Robert Mitchum	Lt. Capt. Bill Walker	The Story of G.I. Joe	
1945 (18th)	J. Carrol Naish	Charley Martin	A Medal for Benny	
1946 (19th)	Harold Russell ‡	Homer Parrish	The Best Years of Our Lives	
1946 (19th)	Charles Coburn	Alexander Gow	The Green Years	
1946 (19th)	William Demarest	Steve Martin	The Jolson Story	
1946 (19th)	Claude Rains	Alexander Sebastian	Notorious	
1946 (19th)	Clifton Webb	Elliott Templeton	The Razor's Edge	
1947 (20th)	Edmund Gwenn ‡	Kris Kringle	Miracle on 34th Street	
1947 (20th)	Charles Bickford	Joseph Clancy	The Farmer's Daughter	
1947 (20th)	Thomas Gomez	Pancho	Ride the Pink Horse	
1947 (20th)	Robert Ryan	Montgomery	Crossfire	
1947 (20th)	Richard Widmark	Tommy Udo	Kiss of Death	
1948 (21st)	Walter Huston ‡	Howard	The Treasure of the Sierra Madre	
1948 (21st)	Charles Bickford	Black McDonald	Johnny Belinda	
1948 (21st)	José Ferrer	The Dauphin – Charles VII, later King of France	Joan of Arc	
1948 (21st)	Oskar Homolka	Uncle Chris Halverson	I Remember Mama	
1948 (21st)	Cecil Kellaway	Horace (A Leprechaun)	The Luck of the Irish	
1949 (22nd)	Dean Jagger ‡	Major Harvey Stovall	Twelve O'Clock High	
1949 (22nd)	John Ireland	Jack Burden	All the King's Men	
1949 (22nd)	Arthur Kennedy	Connie Kelly	Champion	
1949 (22nd)	Ralph Richardson	Dr. Austin Sloper	The Heiress	
1949 (22nd)	James Whitmore	Sgt. Kinnie	Battleground	

=== 1950s ===
Year	Actor	Role(s)	Film	Ref.
1950 (23rd)	George Sanders ‡	Addison DeWitt	All About Eve	
1950 (23rd)	Jeff Chandler	Cochise	Broken Arrow	
1950 (23rd)	Edmund Gwenn	"Skipper" Miller	Mister 880	
1950 (23rd)	Sam Jaffe	Dr. Erwin Riedenschneider	The Asphalt Jungle	
1950 (23rd)	Erich von Stroheim	Max von Meyerling	Sunset Boulevard	
1951 (24th)	Karl Malden ‡	Harold "Mitch" Mitchell	A Streetcar Named Desire	
1951 (24th)	Leo Genn	Petronius	Quo Vadis	
1951 (24th)	Kevin McCarthy	Biff Loman	Death of a Salesman	
1951 (24th)	Peter Ustinov	Nero	Quo Vadis	
1951 (24th)	Gig Young	Boyd Copeland	Come Fill the Cup	
1952 (25th)	Anthony Quinn ‡	Eufemio Zapata	Viva Zapata!	
1952 (25th)	Richard Burton	Philip Ashley	My Cousin Rachel	
1952 (25th)	Arthur Hunnicutt	Zeb Calloway; Narrator	The Big Sky	
1952 (25th)	Victor McLaglen	Will "Red" Danaher	The Quiet Man	
1952 (25th)	Jack Palance	Lester Blaine	Sudden Fear	
1953 (26th)	Frank Sinatra ‡	Pvt. Angelo Maggio	From Here to Eternity	
1953 (26th)	Eddie Albert	Irving Radovich	Roman Holiday	
1953 (26th)	Brandon deWilde	Joey Starrett	Shane	
1953 (26th)	Jack Palance	Jack Wilson	Shane	
1953 (26th)	Robert Strauss	Sgt. Stanislas "Animal" Kasava	Stalag 17	
1954 (27th)	Edmond O'Brien ‡	Oscar Muldoon	The Barefoot Contessa	
1954 (27th)	Lee J. Cobb	Johnny Friendly	On the Waterfront	
1954 (27th)	Karl Malden	Father Barry	On the Waterfront	
1954 (27th)	Rod Steiger	Charley "The Gent" Malloy	On the Waterfront	
1954 (27th)	Tom Tully	Commander DeVriess	The Caine Mutiny	
1955 (28th)	Jack Lemmon ‡	Ensign Frank Thurlowe Pulver	Mister Roberts	
1955 (28th)	Arthur Kennedy	Barney Castle	Trial	
1955 (28th)	Joe Mantell	Angie	Marty	
1955 (28th)	Sal Mineo	John "Plato" Crawford	Rebel Without a Cause	
1955 (28th)	Arthur O'Connell	Howard Bevans	Picnic	
1956 (29th)	Anthony Quinn ‡	Paul Gauguin	Lust for Life	
1956 (29th)	Don Murray	Beauregard "Bo" Decker	Bus Stop	
1956 (29th)	Anthony Perkins	Josh Birdwell	Friendly Persuasion	
1956 (29th)	Mickey Rooney	Dooley	The Bold and the Brave	
1956 (29th)	Robert Stack	Kyle Hadley	Written on the Wind	
1957 (30th)	Red Buttons ‡	Airman Joe Kelly	Sayonara	
1957 (30th)	Vittorio De Sica	Major Alessandro Rinaldi	A Farewell to Arms	
1957 (30th)	Sessue Hayakawa	Colonel Saito	The Bridge on the River Kwai	
1957 (30th)	Arthur Kennedy	Lucas Cross	Peyton Place	
1957 (30th)	Russ Tamblyn	Norman Page	Peyton Place	
1958 (31st)	Burl Ives ‡	Rufus Hannassey	The Big Country	
1958 (31st)	Theodore Bikel	Sheriff Max Muller	The Defiant Ones	
1958 (31st)	Lee J. Cobb	Fyodor Karamazov	The Brothers Karamazov	
1958 (31st)	Arthur Kennedy	Frank Hirsh	Some Came Running	
1958 (31st)	Gig Young	Dr. Hugo Pine	Teacher's Pet	
1959 (32nd)	Hugh Griffith ‡	Sheik Ilderim	Ben-Hur	
1959 (32nd)	Arthur O'Connell	Parnell Emmett McCarthy	Anatomy of a Murder	
1959 (32nd)	George C. Scott	Asst. State Atty. Gen. Claude Dancer	Anatomy of a Murder	
1959 (32nd)	Robert Vaughn	Chester "Chet" Gwynn	The Young Philadelphians	
1959 (32nd)	Ed Wynn	Albert Dussell	The Diary of Anne Frank	

=== 1960s ===
Year	Actor	Role(s)	Film	Ref.
1960 (33rd)	Peter Ustinov ‡	Lentulus Batiatus	Spartacus	
1960 (33rd)	Peter Falk	Abe "Kid Twist" Reles	Murder, Inc.	
1960 (33rd)	Jack Kruschen	Dr. David Dreyfuss	The Apartment	
1960 (33rd)	Sal Mineo	Dov Landau	Exodus	
1960 (33rd)	Chill Wills	Beekeeper	The Alamo	
1961 (34th)	George Chakiris ‡	Bernardo Nuñez	West Side Story	
1961 (34th)	Montgomery Clift	Rudolph Petersen	Judgment at Nuremberg	
1961 (34th)	Peter Falk	Joy Boy	Pocketful of Miracles	
1961 (34th)	Jackie Gleason	Minnesota Fats	The Hustler	
1961 (34th)	George C. Scott (Note: George C. Scott refused his nomination.) §	Bert Gordon	The Hustler	
1962 (35th)	Ed Begley ‡	Tom "Boss" Finley	Sweet Bird of Youth	
1962 (35th)	Victor Buono	Edwin Flagg	What Ever Happened to Baby Jane?	
1962 (35th)	Telly Savalas	Feto Gomez	Birdman of Alcatraz	
1962 (35th)	Omar Sharif	Sherif Ali ibn el Kharish	Lawrence of Arabia	
1962 (35th)	Terence Stamp	Billy Budd	Billy Budd	
1963 (36th)	Melvyn Douglas ‡	Homer Bannon	Hud	
1963 (36th)	Nick Adams	Ben Brown	Twilight of Honor	
1963 (36th)	Bobby Darin	Corporal Jim Tompkins	Captain Newman, M.D.	
1963 (36th)	Hugh Griffith	Squire Western	Tom Jones	
1963 (36th)	John Huston	Cardinal Glennon	The Cardinal	
1964 (37th)	Peter Ustinov ‡	Arthur Simon Simpson	Topkapi	
1964 (37th)	John Gielgud	King Louis VII	Becket	
1964 (37th)	Stanley Holloway	Alfred Doolittle	My Fair Lady	
1964 (37th)	Edmond O'Brien	Senator Raymond Clark	Seven Days in May	
1964 (37th)	Lee Tracy	President Art Hockstader	The Best Man	
1965 (38th)	Martin Balsam ‡	Arnold Burns	A Thousand Clowns	
1965 (38th)	Ian Bannen	"Ratbags" Crow	The Flight of the Phoenix	
1965 (38th)	Tom Courtenay	Pavel "Pasha" Antipov / Strelnikov	Doctor Zhivago	
1965 (38th)	Michael Dunn	Carl Glocken	Ship of Fools	
1965 (38th)	Frank Finlay	Iago	Othello	
1966 (39th)	Walter Matthau ‡	"Whiplash Willie" Gingrich	The Fortune Cookie	
1966 (39th)	Mako	Po-han	The Sand Pebbles	
1966 (39th)	James Mason	James Leamington	Georgy Girl	
1966 (39th)	George Segal	Nick	Who's Afraid of Virginia Woolf?	
1966 (39th)	Robert Shaw	King Henry VIII	A Man for All Seasons	
1967 (40th)	George Kennedy ‡	Dragline	Cool Hand Luke	
1967 (40th)	John Cassavetes	Victor R. Franko	The Dirty Dozen	
1967 (40th)	Gene Hackman	Buck Barrow	Bonnie and Clyde	
1967 (40th)	Cecil Kellaway	Monsignor Mike Ryan	Guess Who's Coming to Dinner	
1967 (40th)	Michael J. Pollard	C.W. Moss	Bonnie and Clyde	
1968 (41st)	Jack Albertson ‡	John Cleary	The Subject Was Roses	
1968 (41st)	Seymour Cassel	Chet	Faces	
1968 (41st)	Daniel Massey	Noël Coward	Star!	
1968 (41st)	Jack Wild	The Artful Dodger	Oliver!	
1968 (41st)	Gene Wilder	Leo Bloom	The Producers	
1969 (42nd)	Gig Young ‡	Rocky Graver	They Shoot Horses, Don't They?	
1969 (42nd)	Rupert Crosse	Ned McCaslin	The Reivers	
1969 (42nd)	Elliott Gould	Ted Henderson	Bob & Carol & Ted & Alice	
1969 (42nd)	Jack Nicholson	George Hanson	Easy Rider	
1969 (42nd)	Anthony Quayle	Cardinal Thomas Wolsey	Anne of the Thousand Days	

=== 1970s ===
Year	Actor	Role(s)	Film	Ref.
1970 (43rd)	John Mills ‡	Michael	Ryan's Daughter	
1970 (43rd)	Richard S. Castellano	Frank Vecchio	Lovers and Other Strangers	
1970 (43rd)	Chief Dan George	Old Lodge Skins	Little Big Man	
1970 (43rd)	Gene Hackman	Gene Garrison	I Never Sang for My Father	
1970 (43rd)	John Marley	Phil Cavalleri	Love Story	
1971 (44th)	Ben Johnson ‡	Sam the Lion	The Last Picture Show	
1971 (44th)	Jeff Bridges	Duane Jackson	The Last Picture Show	
1971 (44th)	Leonard Frey	Motel Kamzoil	Fiddler on the Roof	
1971 (44th)	Richard Jaeckel	Joe Ben Stamper	Sometimes a Great Notion	
1971 (44th)	Roy Scheider	Buddy "Cloudy" Russo	The French Connection	
1972 (45th)	Joel Grey ‡	The Master of Ceremonies	Cabaret	
1972 (45th)	Eddie Albert	Mr. Corcoran	The Heartbreak Kid	
1972 (45th)	James Caan	Santino "Sonny" Corleone	The Godfather	
1972 (45th)	Robert Duvall	Tom Hagen	The Godfather	
1972 (45th)	Al Pacino	Michael Corleone	The Godfather	
1973 (46th)	John Houseman ‡	Charles W. Kingsfield Jr.	The Paper Chase	
1973 (46th)	Vincent Gardenia	Dutch Schnell	Bang the Drum Slowly	
1973 (46th)	Jack Gilford	Phil Greene	Save the Tiger	
1973 (46th)	Jason Miller	Father Damien Karras	The Exorcist	
1973 (46th)	Randy Quaid	Larry Meadows	The Last Detail	
1974 (47th)	Robert De Niro ‡	Vito Corleone	The Godfather Part II	
1974 (47th)	Fred Astaire	Harlee Claiborne	The Towering Inferno	
1974 (47th)	Jeff Bridges	Lightfoot	Thunderbolt and Lightfoot	
1974 (47th)	Michael V. Gazzo	Frank Pentangeli	The Godfather Part II	
1974 (47th)	Lee Strasberg	Hyman Roth	The Godfather Part II	
1975 (48th)	George Burns ‡	Al Lewis	The Sunshine Boys	
1975 (48th)	Brad Dourif	Billy Bibbit	One Flew Over the Cuckoo's Nest	
1975 (48th)	Burgess Meredith	Harry Greener	The Day of the Locust	
1975 (48th)	Chris Sarandon	Leon Shermer	Dog Day Afternoon	
1975 (48th)	Jack Warden	Lester Karpf	Shampoo	
1976 (49th)	Jason Robards ‡	Ben Bradlee	All the President's Men	
1976 (49th)	Ned Beatty	Arthur Jensen	Network	
1976 (49th)	Burgess Meredith	Mickey Goldmill	Rocky	
1976 (49th)	Laurence Olivier	Dr. Christian Szell	Marathon Man	
1976 (49th)	Burt Young	Paulie Pennino	Rocky	
1977 (50th)	Jason Robards ‡	Dashiell Hammett	Julia	
1977 (50th)	Mikhail Baryshnikov	Yuri Kopeikine	The Turning Point	
1977 (50th)	Peter Firth	Alan Strang	Equus	
1977 (50th)	Alec Guinness	Obi-Wan "Ben" Kenobi	Star Wars	
1977 (50th)	Maximilian Schell	Johann	Julia	
1978 (51st)	Christopher Walken ‡	Nikanor "Nick" Chevotarevich	The Deer Hunter	
1978 (51st)	Bruce Dern	Captain Bob Hyde	Coming Home	
1978 (51st)	Richard Farnsworth	Dodger	Comes a Horseman	
1978 (51st)	John Hurt	Max	Midnight Express	
1978 (51st)	Jack Warden	Max Corkle	Heaven Can Wait	
1979 (52nd)	Melvyn Douglas ‡	Benjamin Rand	Being There	
1979 (52nd)	Robert Duvall	Lt. Col. Bill Kilgore	Apocalypse Now	
1979 (52nd)	Frederic Forrest	Houston Dyer	The Rose	
1979 (52nd)	Justin Henry	Billy Kramer	Kramer vs. Kramer	
1979 (52nd)	Mickey Rooney	Henry Dailey	The Black Stallion	

=== 1980s ===
Year	Actor	Role(s)	Film	Ref.
1980 (53rd)	Timothy Hutton ‡	Conrad Jarrett	Ordinary People	
1980 (53rd)	Judd Hirsch	Dr. Tyrone C. Berger	Ordinary People	
1980 (53rd)	Michael O'Keefe	Ben Meechum	The Great Santini	
1980 (53rd)	Joe Pesci	Joey LaMotta	Raging Bull	
1980 (53rd)	Jason Robards	Howard Hughes	Melvin and Howard	
1981 (54th)	John Gielgud ‡	Hobson	Arthur	
1981 (54th)	James Coco	Jimmy Perrino	Only When I Laugh	
1981 (54th)	Ian Holm	Sam Mussabini	Chariots of Fire	
1981 (54th)	Jack Nicholson	Eugene O'Neill	Reds	
1981 (54th)	Howard Rollins	Coalhouse Walker Jr.	Ragtime	
1982 (55th)	Louis Gossett Jr. ‡	Gunnery Sgt. Emil Foley	An Officer and a Gentleman	
1982 (55th)	Charles Durning	The Governor of Texas	The Best Little Whorehouse in Texas	
1982 (55th)	John Lithgow	Roberta Muldoon	The World According to Garp	
1982 (55th)	James Mason	Ed Concannon	The Verdict	
1982 (55th)	Robert Preston	Carroll 'Toddy' Todd	Victor/Victoria	
1983 (56th)	Jack Nicholson ‡	Garrett Breedlove	Terms of Endearment	
1983 (56th)	Charles Durning	Colonel Erhardt	To Be or Not to Be	
1983 (56th)	John Lithgow	Sam Burns	Terms of Endearment	
1983 (56th)	Sam Shepard	Chuck Yeager	The Right Stuff	
1983 (56th)	Rip Torn	Marsh Turner	Cross Creek	
1984 (57th)	Haing S. Ngor ‡	Dith Pran	The Killing Fields	
1984 (57th)	Adolph Caesar	Sgt. Vernon Waters	A Soldier's Story	
1984 (57th)	John Malkovich	Mr. Will	Places in the Heart	
1984 (57th)	Pat Morita	Mr. Miyagi	The Karate Kid	
1984 (57th)	Ralph Richardson †	The Sixth Earl of Greystoke	Greystoke: The Legend of Tarzan, Lord of the Apes	
1985 (58th)	Don Ameche ‡	Arthur Selwyn	Cocoon	
1985 (58th)	Klaus Maria Brandauer	Baron Bror von Blixen-Finecke and Baron Hans von Blixen-Finecke	Out of Africa	
1985 (58th)	William Hickey	Don Corrado Prizzi	Prizzi's Honor	
1985 (58th)	Robert Loggia	Sam Ransom	Jagged Edge	
1985 (58th)	Eric Roberts	Buck McGeehy	Runaway Train	
1986 (59th)	Michael Caine ‡	Elliott Daniels	Hannah and Her Sisters	
1986 (59th)	Tom Berenger	Sgt. Bob Barnes	Platoon	
1986 (59th)	Willem Dafoe	Sgt. Elias Grodin	Platoon	
1986 (59th)	Denholm Elliott	Mr. Emerson	A Room with a View	
1986 (59th)	Dennis Hopper	Wilbur "Shooter" Flatch	Hoosiers	
1987 (60th)	Sean Connery ‡	Jimmy Malone	The Untouchables	
1987 (60th)	Albert Brooks	Aaron Altman	Broadcast News	
1987 (60th)	Morgan Freeman	Leo "Fast Black" Smalls Jr.	Street Smart	
1987 (60th)	Vincent Gardenia	Cosmo Castorini	Moonstruck	
1987 (60th)	Denzel Washington	Steve Biko	Cry Freedom	
1988 (61st)	Kevin Kline ‡	Otto West	A Fish Called Wanda	
1988 (61st)	Alec Guinness	William Dorrit	Little Dorrit	
1988 (61st)	Martin Landau	Abe Karatz	Tucker: The Man and His Dream	
1988 (61st)	River Phoenix	Danny Pope	Running on Empty	
1988 (61st)	Dean Stockwell	Tony "The Tiger" Russo	Married to the Mob	
1989 (62nd)	Denzel Washington ‡	Pvt. Silas Trip	Glory	
1989 (62nd)	Danny Aiello	Sal Frangione	Do the Right Thing	
1989 (62nd)	Dan Aykroyd	Boolie Werthan	Driving Miss Daisy	
1989 (62nd)	Marlon Brando	Ian Mackenzie	A Dry White Season	
1989 (62nd)	Martin Landau	Judah Rosenthal	Crimes and Misdemeanors	

=== 1990s ===
Year	Actor	Role(s)	Film	Ref.
1990 (63rd)	Joe Pesci ‡	Tommy DeVito	GoodFellas	
1990 (63rd)	Bruce Davison	David Elders	Longtime Companion	
1990 (63rd)	Andy García	Vincent Mancini	The Godfather Part III	
1990 (63rd)	Graham Greene	Kicking Bird	Dances With Wolves	
1990 (63rd)	Al Pacino	Alphonse "Big Boy" Caprice	Dick Tracy	
1991 (64th)	Jack Palance ‡	Curly Washburn	City Slickers	
1991 (64th)	Tommy Lee Jones	Clay Shaw	JFK	
1991 (64th)	Harvey Keitel	Mickey Cohen	Bugsy	
1991 (64th)	Ben Kingsley	Meyer Lansky	Bugsy	
1991 (64th)	Michael Lerner	Jack Lipnick	Barton Fink	
1992 (65th)	Gene Hackman ‡	"Little" Bill Daggett	Unforgiven	
1992 (65th)	Jaye Davidson	Dil	The Crying Game	
1992 (65th)	Jack Nicholson	Col. Nathan R. Jessep	A Few Good Men	
1992 (65th)	Al Pacino	Richard "Ricky" Roma	Glengarry Glen Ross	
1992 (65th)	David Paymer	Stan Young	Mr. Saturday Night	
1993 (66th)	Tommy Lee Jones ‡	U.S. Marshal Samuel Gerard	The Fugitive	
1993 (66th)	Leonardo DiCaprio	Arnold "Arnie" Grape	What's Eating Gilbert Grape	
1993 (66th)	Ralph Fiennes	Amon Göth	Schindler's List	
1993 (66th)	John Malkovich	Mitch Leary	In the Line of Fire	
1993 (66th)	Pete Postlethwaite	Giuseppe Conlon	In the Name of the Father	
1994 (67th)	Martin Landau ‡	Béla Lugosi	Ed Wood	
1994 (67th)	Samuel L. Jackson	Jules Winnfield	Pulp Fiction	
1994 (67th)	Chazz Palminteri	Cheech	Bullets Over Broadway	
1994 (67th)	Paul Scofield	Mark Van Doren	Quiz Show	
1994 (67th)	Gary Sinise	Lt. Dan Taylor	Forrest Gump	
1995 (68th)	Kevin Spacey ‡	Roger "Verbal" Kint	The Usual Suspects	
1995 (68th)	James Cromwell	Arthur Hoggett	Babe	
1995 (68th)	Ed Harris	Gene Kranz	Apollo 13	
1995 (68th)	Brad Pitt	Jeffrey Goines	12 Monkeys	
1995 (68th)	Tim Roth	Archibald Cunningham	Rob Roy	
1996 (69th)	Cuba Gooding Jr. ‡	Rod Tidwell	Jerry Maguire	
1996 (69th)	William H. Macy	Jerry Lundegaard	Fargo	
1996 (69th)	Armin Mueller-Stahl	Peter Helfgott	Shine	
1996 (69th)	Edward Norton	Aaron Stampler	Primal Fear	
1996 (69th)	James Woods	Byron De La Beckwith	Ghosts of Mississippi	
1997 (70th)	Robin Williams ‡	Sean Maguire	Good Will Hunting	
1997 (70th)	Robert Forster	Max Cherry	Jackie Brown	
1997 (70th)	Anthony Hopkins	John Quincy Adams	Amistad	
1997 (70th)	Greg Kinnear	Simon Bishop	As Good as It Gets	
1997 (70th)	Burt Reynolds	Jack Horner	Boogie Nights	
1998 (71st)	James Coburn ‡	Glen Whitehouse	Affliction	
1998 (71st)	Robert Duvall	Jerome Facher	A Civil Action	
1998 (71st)	Ed Harris	Christof	The Truman Show	
1998 (71st)	Geoffrey Rush	Philip Henslowe	Shakespeare in Love	
1998 (71st)	Billy Bob Thornton	Jacob Mitchell	A Simple Plan	
1999 (72nd)	Michael Caine ‡	Dr. Wilbur Larch	The Cider House Rules	
1999 (72nd)	Tom Cruise	Frank T.J. Mackey	Magnolia	
1999 (72nd)	Michael Clarke Duncan	John Coffey	The Green Mile	
1999 (72nd)	Jude Law	Dickie Greenleaf	The Talented Mr. Ripley	
1999 (72nd)	Haley Joel Osment	Cole Sear	The Sixth Sense	

=== 2000s ===
Year	Actor	Role(s)	Film	Ref.
2000 (73rd)	Benicio del Toro ‡	Javier Rodriguez	Traffic	
2000 (73rd)	Jeff Bridges	Jackson Evans	The Contender	
2000 (73rd)	Willem Dafoe	Max Schreck	Shadow of the Vampire	
2000 (73rd)	Albert Finney	Edward L. Masry	Erin Brockovich	
2000 (73rd)	Joaquin Phoenix	Emperor Commodus	Gladiator	
2001 (74th)	Jim Broadbent ‡	John Bayley	Iris	
2001 (74th)	Ethan Hawke	Jake Hoyt	Training Day	
2001 (74th)	Ben Kingsley	Don Logan	Sexy Beast	
2001 (74th)	Ian McKellen	Gandalf the Grey	The Lord of the Rings: The Fellowship of the Ring	
2001 (74th)	Jon Voight	Howard Cosell	Ali	
2002 (75th)	Chris Cooper ‡	John Laroche	Adaptation	
2002 (75th)	Ed Harris	Richard "Richie" Brown	The Hours	
2002 (75th)	Paul Newman	John Rooney	Road to Perdition	
2002 (75th)	John C. Reilly	Amos Hart	Chicago	
2002 (75th)	Christopher Walken	Frank Abagnale Sr.	Catch Me If You Can	
2003 (76th)	Tim Robbins ‡	Dave Boyle	Mystic River	
2003 (76th)	Alec Baldwin	Shelly Kaplow	The Cooler	
2003 (76th)	Benicio del Toro	Jack Jordan	21 Grams	
2003 (76th)	Djimon Hounsou	Mateo Kuamey	In America	
2003 (76th)	Ken Watanabe	Lord Moritsugu Katsumoto	The Last Samurai	
2004 (77th)	Morgan Freeman ‡	Eddie "Scrap-Iron" Dupris	Million Dollar Baby	
2004 (77th)	Alan Alda	Owen Brewster	The Aviator	
2004 (77th)	Thomas Haden Church	Jack Cole	Sideways	
2004 (77th)	Jamie Foxx	Max Durocher	Collateral	
2004 (77th)	Clive Owen	Larry Gray	Closer	
2005 (78th)	George Clooney ‡	Bob Barnes	Syriana	
2005 (78th)	Matt Dillon	John Ryan	Crash	
2005 (78th)	Paul Giamatti	Joe Gould	Cinderella Man	
2005 (78th)	Jake Gyllenhaal	Jack Twist	Brokeback Mountain	
2005 (78th)	William Hurt	Richie Cusack	A History of Violence	
2006 (79th)	Alan Arkin ‡	Edwin Hoover	Little Miss Sunshine	
2006 (79th)	Jackie Earle Haley	Ronald James McGorvey	Little Children	
2006 (79th)	Djimon Hounsou	Solomon Vandy	Blood Diamond	
2006 (79th)	Eddie Murphy	James "Thunder" Early	Dreamgirls	
2006 (79th)	Mark Wahlberg	Staff Sergeant Sean Dignam	The Departed	
2007 (80th)	Javier Bardem ‡	Anton Chigurh	No Country for Old Men	
2007 (80th)	Casey Affleck	Robert Ford	The Assassination of Jesse James by the Coward Robert Ford	
2007 (80th)	Philip Seymour Hoffman	Gust Avrakotos	Charlie Wilson's War	
2007 (80th)	Hal Holbrook	Ron Franz	Into the Wild	
2007 (80th)	Tom Wilkinson	Arthur Edens	Michael Clayton	
2008 (81st)	Heath Ledger †	The Joker	The Dark Knight	
2008 (81st)	Josh Brolin	Dan White	Milk	
2008 (81st)	Robert Downey Jr.	Kirk Lazarus	Tropic Thunder	
2008 (81st)	Philip Seymour Hoffman	Father Brendan Flynn	Doubt	
2008 (81st)	Michael Shannon	John Givings Jr.	Revolutionary Road	
2009 (82nd)	Christoph Waltz ‡	SS Colonel Hans Landa	Inglourious Basterds	
2009 (82nd)	Matt Damon	Francois Pienaar	Invictus	
2009 (82nd)	Woody Harrelson	Captain Tony Stone	The Messenger	
2009 (82nd)	Christopher Plummer	Leo Tolstoy	The Last Station	
2009 (82nd)	Stanley Tucci	George Harvey	The Lovely Bones	

=== 2010s ===
Year	Actor	Role(s)	Film	Ref.
2010 (83rd)	Christian Bale ‡	Dicky Eklund	The Fighter	
2010 (83rd)	John Hawkes	Teardrop Dolly	Winter's Bone	
2010 (83rd)	Jeremy Renner	James "Jem" Coughlin	The Town	
2010 (83rd)	Mark Ruffalo	Paul Hatfield	The Kids Are All Right	
2010 (83rd)	Geoffrey Rush	Lionel Logue	The King's Speech	
2011 (84th)	Christopher Plummer ‡	Hal Fields	Beginners	
2011 (84th)	Kenneth Branagh	Laurence Olivier	My Week with Marilyn	
2011 (84th)	Jonah Hill	Peter Brand	Moneyball	
2011 (84th)	Nick Nolte	Paddy Conlon	Warrior	
2011 (84th)	Max von Sydow	The Renter	Extremely Loud & Incredibly Close	
2012 (85th)	Christoph Waltz ‡	Dr. King Schultz	Django Unchained	
2012 (85th)	Alan Arkin	Lester Siegel	Argo	
2012 (85th)	Robert De Niro	Patrizio Solitano Sr.	Silver Linings Playbook	
2012 (85th)	Philip Seymour Hoffman	Lancaster Dodd	The Master	
2012 (85th)	Tommy Lee Jones	Thaddeus Stevens	Lincoln	
2013 (86th)	Jared Leto ‡	Rayon	Dallas Buyers Club	
2013 (86th)	Barkhad Abdi	Abduwali Muse	Captain Phillips	
2013 (86th)	Bradley Cooper	Richie DiMaso	American Hustle	
2013 (86th)	Michael Fassbender	Edwin Epps	12 Years a Slave	
2013 (86th)	Jonah Hill	Donnie Azoff	The Wolf of Wall Street	
2014 (87th)	J. K. Simmons ‡	Terence Fletcher	Whiplash	
2014 (87th)	Robert Duvall	Joseph Palmer	The Judge	
2014 (87th)	Ethan Hawke	Mason Evans Sr.	Boyhood	
2014 (87th)	Edward Norton	Mike Shiner	Birdman	
2014 (87th)	Mark Ruffalo	David Schultz	Foxcatcher	
2015 (88th)	Mark Rylance ‡	Rudolf Abel	Bridge of Spies	
2015 (88th)	Christian Bale	Michael Burry	The Big Short	
2015 (88th)	Tom Hardy	John Fitzgerald	The Revenant	
2015 (88th)	Mark Ruffalo	Michael Rezendes	Spotlight	
2015 (88th)	Sylvester Stallone	Rocky Balboa	Creed	
2016 (89th)	Mahershala Ali ‡	Juan	Moonlight	
2016 (89th)	Jeff Bridges	Marcus Hamilton	Hell or High Water	
2016 (89th)	Lucas Hedges	Patrick Chandler	Manchester by the Sea	
2016 (89th)	Dev Patel	Saroo Brierley	Lion	
2016 (89th)	Michael Shannon	Bobby Andes	Nocturnal Animals	
2017 (90th)	Sam Rockwell ‡	Jason Dixon	Three Billboards Outside Ebbing, Missouri	
2017 (90th)	Willem Dafoe	Bobby Hicks	The Florida Project	
2017 (90th)	Woody Harrelson	Bill Willoughby	Three Billboards Outside Ebbing, Missouri	
2017 (90th)	Richard Jenkins	Giles	The Shape of Water	
2017 (90th)	Christopher Plummer	J. Paul Getty	All the Money in the World	
2018 (91st)	Mahershala Ali ‡	Don Shirley	Green Book	
2018 (91st)	Adam Driver	Philip "Flip" Zimmerman	BlacKkKlansman	
2018 (91st)	Sam Elliott	Bobby Maine	A Star Is Born	
2018 (91st)	Richard E. Grant	Jack Hock	Can You Ever Forgive Me?	
2018 (91st)	Sam Rockwell	George W. Bush	Vice	
2019 (92nd)	Brad Pitt ‡	Cliff Booth	Once Upon a Time in Hollywood	
2019 (92nd)	Tom Hanks	Fred Rogers	A Beautiful Day in the Neighborhood	
2019 (92nd)	Anthony Hopkins	Pope Benedict XVI	The Two Popes	
2019 (92nd)	Al Pacino	Jimmy Hoffa	The Irishman	
2019 (92nd)	Joe Pesci	Russell Bufalino	The Irishman	

=== 2020s ===
Year	Actor	Role(s)	Film	Ref.
2020/21 (93rd)	Daniel Kaluuya ‡	Fred Hampton	Judas and the Black Messiah (Note: An anomaly occurred when both LaKeith Stanfield and Daniel Kaluuya received nominations in the supporting category, despite the former being campaigned for the lead race. This occurrence is likely a direct effect of the AMPAS rule enacted after Fitzgerald's nominations at the 17th ceremony. Stanfield and Kaluuya received votes in both categories, but each of them had more nominations in supporting, thus each making the top five nominees in this category.)	
2020/21 (93rd)	Sacha Baron Cohen	Abbie Hoffman	The Trial of the Chicago 7	
2020/21 (93rd)	Leslie Odom Jr.	Sam Cooke	One Night in Miami...	
2020/21 (93rd)	Paul Raci	Joe	Sound of Metal	
2020/21 (93rd)	LaKeith Stanfield	William O'Neal	Judas and the Black Messiah	
2021 (94th)	Troy Kotsur ‡	Frank Rossi	CODA	
2021 (94th)	Ciarán Hinds	Pop	Belfast	
2021 (94th)	Jesse Plemons	George Burbank	The Power of the Dog	
2021 (94th)	J. K. Simmons	William Frawley	Being the Ricardos	
2021 (94th)	Kodi Smit-McPhee	Peter Gordon	The Power of the Dog	
2022 (95th)	Ke Huy Quan ‡	Waymond Wang	Everything Everywhere All at Once	
2022 (95th)	Brendan Gleeson	Colm Doherty	The Banshees of Inisherin	
2022 (95th)	Brian Tyree Henry	James Aucoin	Causeway	
2022 (95th)	Judd Hirsch	Boris Podgorny	The Fabelmans	
2022 (95th)	Barry Keoghan	Dominic Kearney	The Banshees of Inisherin	
2023 (96th)	Robert Downey Jr. ‡	Lewis Strauss	Oppenheimer	
2023 (96th)	Sterling K. Brown	Clifford "Cliff" Ellison	American Fiction	
2023 (96th)	Robert De Niro	William King Hale	Killers of the Flower Moon	
2023 (96th)	Ryan Gosling	Ken	Barbie	
2023 (96th)	Mark Ruffalo	Duncan Wedderburn	Poor Things	
2024 (97th)	Kieran Culkin ‡	Benjamin "Benji" Kaplan	A Real Pain	
2024 (97th)	Yura Borisov	Igor	Anora	
2024 (97th)	Edward Norton	Pete Seeger	A Complete Unknown	
2024 (97th)	Guy Pearce	Harrison Lee Van Buren Sr.	The Brutalist	
2024 (97th)	Jeremy Strong	Roy Cohn	The Apprentice	
2025 (98th)	Sean Penn ‡	Col. Steven J. Lockjaw	One Battle After Another	
2025 (98th)	Benicio del Toro	Sensei Sergio St. Carlos	One Battle After Another	
2025 (98th)	Jacob Elordi	The Creature	Frankenstein	
2025 (98th)	Delroy Lindo	Delta Slim	Sinners	
2025 (98th)	Stellan Skarsgård	Gustav Borg	Sentimental Value	

== Multiple wins and nominations ==
The following individuals received two or more Best Supporting Actor awards:

Wins	Actor	Nominations
3	Walter Brennan	4
2	Jason Robards	3
2	Peter Ustinov	3
2	Mahershala Ali	2
2	Michael Caine	2
2	Melvyn Douglas	2
2	Anthony Quinn	2
2	Christoph Waltz	2

The following individuals received two or more Best Supporting Actor nominations:

Nominations	Actor
4	Walter Brennan
4	Jeff Bridges
4	Robert Duvall
4	Arthur Kennedy
4	Jack Nicholson
4	Al Pacino
4	Claude Rains
4	Mark Ruffalo
3	Charles Bickford
3	Charles Coburn
3	Willem Dafoe
3	Benicio Del Toro
3	Robert De Niro
3	Gene Hackman
3	Ed Harris
3	Philip Seymour Hoffman
3	Tommy Lee Jones
3	Martin Landau
3	Edward Norton
3	Jack Palance
3	Joe Pesci
3	Christopher Plummer
3	Jason Robards
3	Peter Ustinov
3	Gig Young
2	Eddie Albert
2	Mahershala Ali
2	Alan Arkin
2	Christian Bale
2	Michael Caine
2	Lee J. Cobb
2	Robert Downey Jr.
2	Charles Durning
2	Peter Falk
2	Morgan Freeman
2	Vincent Gardenia
2	John Gielgud
2	Hugh Griffith
2	Alec Guinness
2	Edmund Gwenn
2	Woody Harrelson
2	Ethan Hawke
2	Jonah Hill
2	Judd Hirsch
2	Anthony Hopkins
2	Djimon Hounsou
2	Walter Huston
2	Cecil Kellaway
2	Ben Kingsley
2	John Lithgow
2	Karl Malden
2	John Malkovich
2	James Mason
2	Burgess Meredith
2	Sal Mineo
2	Thomas Mitchell
2	J. Carrol Naish
2	Edmond O'Brien
2	Arthur O'Connell
2	Brad Pitt
2	Anthony Quinn
2	Basil Rathbone
2	Ralph Richardson
2	Sam Rockwell
2	Mickey Rooney
2	Geoffrey Rush
2	George C. Scott
2	Michael Shannon
2	J. K. Simmons
2	Akim Tamiroff
2	Christopher Walken
2	Christoph Waltz
2	Jack Warden
2	Denzel Washington
2	Clifton Webb

== Age superlatives ==
Record	Actor	Film	Year	Age (in years)	Ref.
Oldest winner	Christopher Plummer	Beginners	2012	82	
Oldest nominee	Christopher Plummer	All the Money in the World	2018	88	
Youngest winner	Timothy Hutton	Ordinary People	1981	20	
Youngest nominee	Justin Henry	Kramer vs. Kramer	1980	8	

== Films with multiple Supporting Actor nominations ==
There have been 23 instances in which films have produced more than one nominee within this category. All resulted in two nominations, with the exceptions of On the Waterfront (1954), The Godfather (1972), and The Godfather Part II (1974), which each obtained three.

Winners are in bold.

- Mr. Smith Goes to Washington (1939) – Harry Carey Sr. and Claude Rains
- Quo Vadis (1951) – Leo Genn and Peter Ustinov
- Shane (1953) – Brandon deWilde and Jack Palance
- On the Waterfront (1954) – Lee J. Cobb, Karl Malden, and Rod Steiger
- Peyton Place (1957) – Arthur Kennedy and Russ Tamblyn
- Anatomy of a Murder (1959) – Arthur O'Connell and George C. Scott
- The Hustler (1961) – Jackie Gleason and George C. Scott
- Bonnie and Clyde (1967) – Gene Hackman and Michael J. Pollard
- The Last Picture Show (1971) – Jeff Bridges and **Ben Johnson**
- The Godfather (1972) – James Caan, Robert Duvall, and Al Pacino
- The Godfather Part II (1974) – **Robert De Niro**, Michael V. Gazzo, and Lee Strasberg
- Rocky (1976) – Burgess Meredith and Burt Young
- Julia (1977) – **Jason Robards** and Maximilian Schell
- Ordinary People (1980) – Judd Hirsch and **Timothy Hutton**
- Terms of Endearment (1983) – John Lithgow and **Jack Nicholson**
- Platoon (1986) – Tom Berenger and Willem Dafoe
- Bugsy (1991) – Harvey Keitel and Ben Kingsley
- Three Billboards Outside Ebbing, Missouri (2017) – Woody Harrelson and **Sam Rockwell**
- The Irishman (2019) – Al Pacino and Joe Pesci
- Judas and the Black Messiah (2020) (Note: Judas and the Black Messiah was not released in theaters until 2021, due to the COVID-19 pandemic disrupting theatrical releases. However, Academy guidelines were adjusted for 2020, thus allowing this and several other films to be submitted for the 2020 calendar year of nominees/winners.) – **Daniel Kaluuya** and LaKeith Stanfield
- The Power of the Dog (2021) – Jesse Plemons and Kodi Smit-McPhee
- The Banshees of Inisherin (2022) – Brendan Gleeson and Barry Keoghan
- One Battle After Another (2025) – Benicio Del Toro and **Sean Penn**

== Multiple character nominations ==
- Max "Pop" Corkle from Here Comes Mr. Jordan (James Gleason, 1941) and Heaven Can Wait (Jack Warden, 1978)

Thus far, this is the only instance of the same character producing two nominated performances within this particular same category.

== See also ==
- Academy Award for Best Supporting Actress
- Actor Award for Outstanding Performance by a Male Actor in a Supporting Role
- BAFTA Award for Best Actor in a Supporting Role
- Critics' Choice Movie Award for Best Supporting Actor
- Golden Globe Award for Best Supporting Actor – Motion Picture
- Independent Spirit Award for Best Supporting Performance
- Lists of acting awards
- List of actors with Academy Award nominations
- List of actors with more than one Academy Award nomination in the acting categories
- List of actors with two or more Academy Awards in acting categories
- List of awards for supporting actor

== Bibliography ==
- Crouse, Richard (2005). Reel Winners: Movie Award Trivia. Toronto, Ontario, Canada: University of Toronto Press. ISBN 978-1-55002-574-3.
- Kinn, Gail; Piazza, Jim (2014). The Academy Awards: The Complete Unofficial History (5 ed.). New York, United States: Workman Publishing Company. ISBN 978-1-57912-986-6.
- Levy, Emanuel (2003). All About Oscar: The History and Politics of the Academy Awards. New York, United States: Continuum International Publishing Group. ISBN 978-0-8264-1452-6.
- Thise, Mark (2008). Hollywood Winners & Losers A to Z. New York, United States: Limelight Editions. ISBN 978-0-87910-351-4.
