= William Franklin Anderson =

American Methodist pastor, writer and educator

William F. Anderson
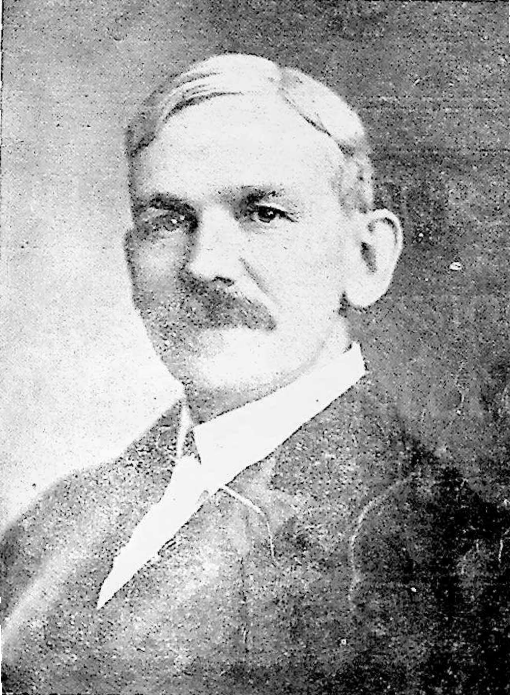

Acting President of Boston University
- In office 1925–1926
- Preceded by: Lemuel Herbert Murlin
- Succeeded by: Daniel L. Marsh

Methodist Episcopal Bishop of Boston
- In office 1924–1932
- Preceded by: Edwin Holt Hughes
- Succeeded by: Charles Wesley Burns

Methodist Episcopal Bishop of Cincinnati
- In office 1912–1924
- Preceded by: David Hastings Moore
- Succeeded by: Theodore Sommers Henderson

Personal details
- Born: William F. Anderson; April 22, 1860 Morgantown, West Virginia
- Died: July 22, 1944 (aged 84) Buzzards Bay, Massachusetts
- Spouse: Jennie Lulah Ketcham
- Education: Ohio Wesleyan University; Drew Theological Seminary; New York University
- Profession: Pastor; Educator

William Franklin Anderson (1860–1944) was an American Methodist pastor, writer, and educator who served as Bishop of Chattanooga, Cincinnati, and Boston and was Acting President of Boston University from January 1, 1925, to May 15, 1926.

== Early life ==
Anderson was born on April 22, 1860, in Morgantown, West Virginia. As a child he had a passion for law and politics, but his religious upbringing led him to enter the church. He attended West Virginia University for three years before transferring to Ohio Wesleyan University. He then went on to Drew Theological Seminary, where he earned a bachelor's degree in divinity in 1887. In 1887 Anderson was ordained a minister of the Methodist Episcopal Church. That same year he married Jennie Lulah Ketcham, the daughter of a Cincinnati minister and a classmate of his from Ohio Wesleyan. They would go on to have seven children.

== Methodist ministry ==
Anderson's first pastorate was the Mott Avenue Church in New York City. He then served at St. James' Church in Kingston, New York, the Washington Square Church in New York City, and at a church in Ossining, New York.

In 1898 his interest in teaching landed him the job of recording secretary to the board of education of the Methodist Church. That same year he graduated from New York University with a master's degree in philosophy. In 1904 he was promoted to corresponding secretary.

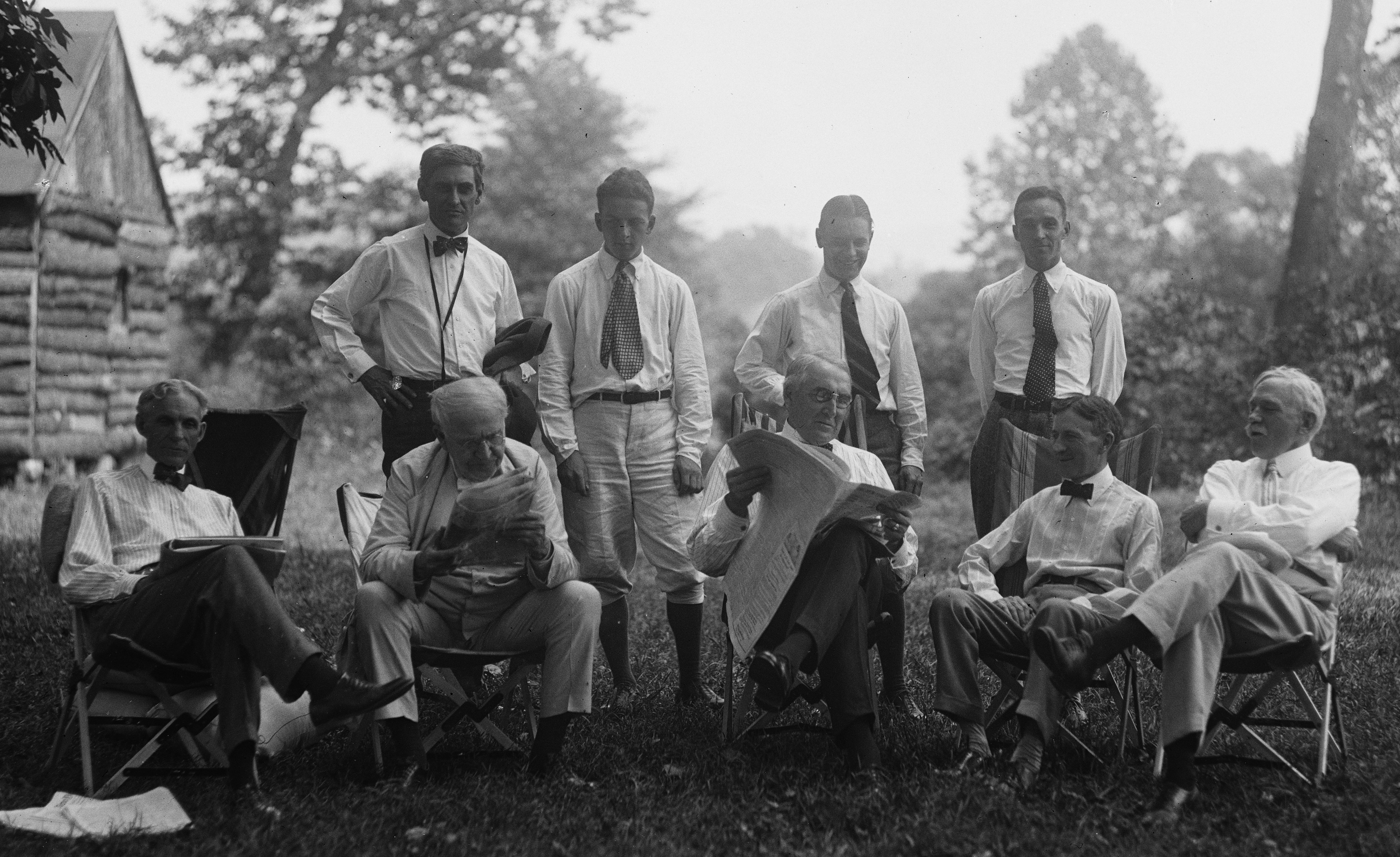
Henry Ford, Thomas Edison, Warren G. Harding, Harvey S. Firestone, and Anderson

In 1908 he was made a bishop. His first assignment was at Chattanooga, Tennessee where he served until 1912. He then transferred to Cincinnati, Ohio. During World War I, he made five trips to Europe. He made frequent visits to the battlefronts with the French and Italian armies. From 1915 to 1918, he was the church's official supervisor of its missions in Italy, France, Finland, Norway, North Africa, and Russia. In 1922 he was made a Chevalier of the Legion of Honour.

In 1921 he accompanied Henry Ford, Harvey S. Firestone, and Thomas Edison on their camping trip. He also had a friendship with U.S. President Warren G. Harding, who joined them on their camping trip in 1922.

On June 10, 1924, he offered a lengthy invocation at the opening of the 1924 Republican National Convention. His words were broadcast on radio and published verbatim in newspapers around the country. Among other things, he called for "stricter observance of the law and the preservation of the Constitution of the United States," in other words, for more zealous enforcement of Prohibition.

== Academic career ==
In 1924, Anderson was assigned to the Boston area. Soon thereafter, he was elected to the Boston University Board of Trustees. On January 1, 1925, he was named acting president of the university after Lemuel Herbert Murlin resigned to accept the same position at De Pauw University. He remained acting president until May 15, 1926, when Daniel L. Marsh was inaugurated. While serving as president, Anderson was elected president of the Methodist Episcopal Church's board of education. He also held trusteeships at Drew Theological Seminary, Ohio Wesleyan University, Goucher College, Ohio Northern University, Baldwin–Wallace College, and Meharry Medical College.

In 1932, church regulations forced Anderson into retirement and he became chair of religion and college chaplain at Carleton College, where he remained until 1935. During the 1937 spring semester he taught religion at Tennessee Wesleyan College. From 1937 to 1941 he was an associate professor of religion at Florida Southern College.

== Death ==
Anderson died on July 22, 1944, at his summer home in Buzzards Bay, Massachusetts.
