= Arsenal Technical High School =

Public high school in Indianapolis, Indiana, US

Location
- 1500 East Michigan Street; Indianapolis, Indiana 46201; United States

Information
- School type: Public
- Motto: Arsenal of Education
- Established: 1912
- School district: Indianapolis Public Schools
- Superintendent: Aleesia Johnson
- School number: 716
- Principal: Corye Franklin
- Grades: 9–12
- Enrollment: 2,524 (2023-2024)
- Campus size: 78 acres (320,000 m^{2})
- Campus type: multi-building
- Color
- Song: Oh, Technical!
- Fight song: The Tech Student
- Athletics conference: North Central Conference
- Sports: Basketball, Football, Track & Field, Soccer, Golf, Volleyball, Tennis, Swimming, Softball, Baseball, Wrestling, and Rugby
- Nickname: Titans
- Rival: Broad Ripple High School
- Newspaper: The Arsenal Cannon
- Yearbook: The Arsenal Cannon
- Feeder schools: Harshman Middle School
- Website: arsenaltech.myips.org
- U.S. Arsenal (Arsenal Technical High School)
- U.S. National Register of Historic Places
- U.S. Historic district
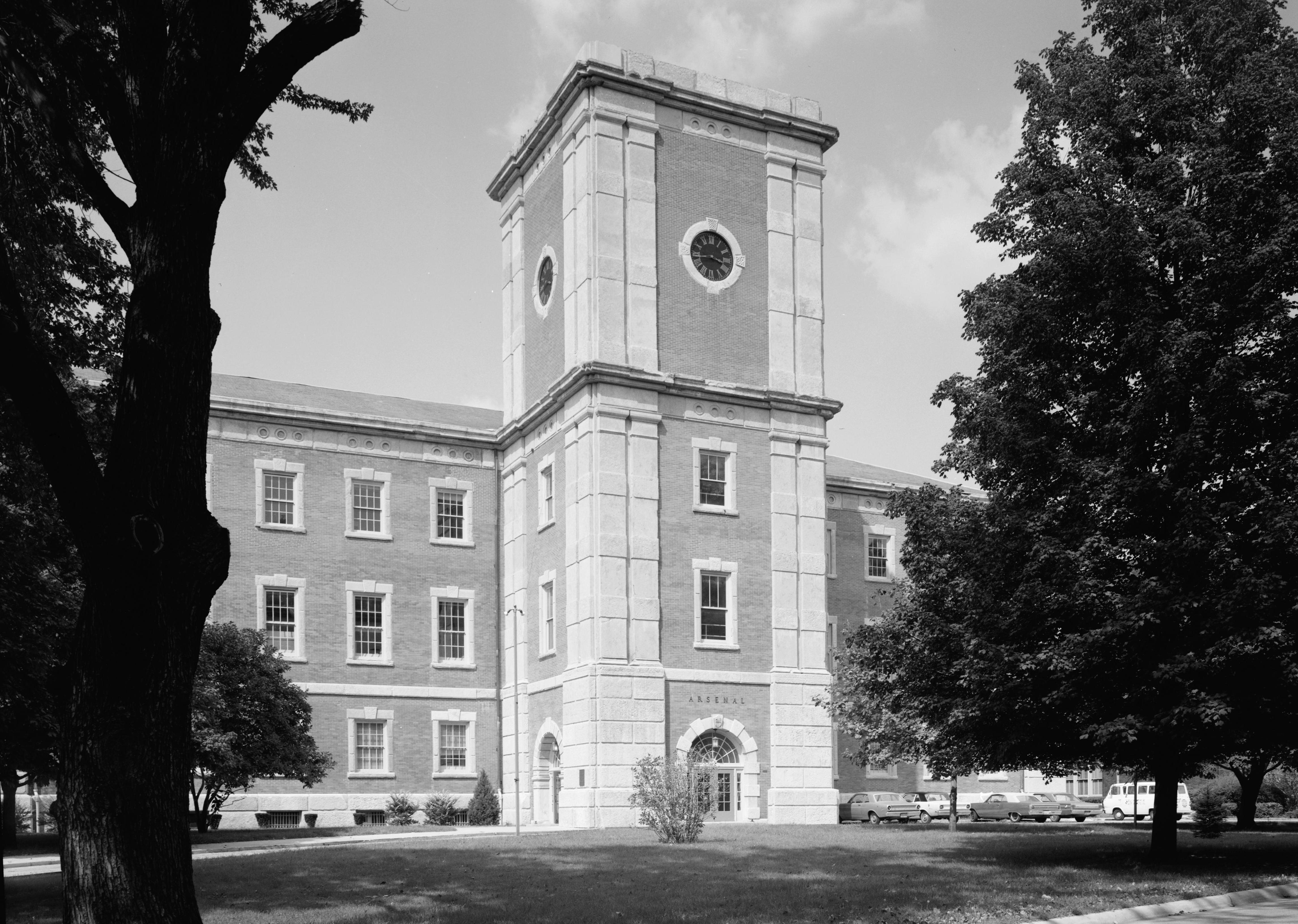
- Front of the original arsenal building, which is now used for school administrative purposes

- Location within Indianapolis Location within Indiana Location within the United States
- Location: 1500 E. Michigan St., Indianapolis, Indiana
- Coordinates: 39°46′40″N 86°7′59″W
- Area: 79.4 acres (32.1 ha)
- Built: 1863
- Architect: Multiple
- NRHP reference No.: 76000034
- Added to NRHP: May 19, 1976

Arsenal Technical High School, commonly referred to as Tech or Arsenal Tech, is a public high school in Indianapolis, Indiana, United States, which is run by the Indianapolis Public Schools district. The school is located on a 76-acre (31 ha), multiple building campus east of downtown Indianapolis, and is the only such type school in Indiana.

The school's campus originally served as a U.S. Civil War era arsenal from 1864 until 1903, when it was closed following the Spanish–American War. A few years later, the school opened in 1912 under founder Milo H. Stuart. A number of extant buildings dating back to military use are still open and serve academic purposes for the school, such as the Arsenal building and the Barracks. In addition, a number of additional buildings were built in the following decades to accommodate the school's functions. Due to the significance of the school's campus, facilities, and history, Arsenal Technical was placed on the National Register of Historic Places in 1976.

Arsenal Technical offers four academic programs at the school. These include the New Tech program, the Math and Science program, the Law and Public Policy program, and the Career Technology Center.

== History ==
Arsenal Technical High School, once a United States Arsenal, includes a Civil War armory complex and 20th-century buildings on its campus. The campus has dual significance as the oldest military installation in central Indiana, and the third oldest high school in Indianapolis (of which it is the second oldest high school to still operate at its original location).

=== United States arsenal ===
Following the election of Abraham Lincoln to the presidency of the United States, the prospect of civil war was evident. Indiana governor Oliver P. Morton ordered the temporary creation of an Indiana arsenal in 1861 on the present grounds of the Indiana State House. However, it soon became clear that the location would not suffice, and in 1862, Congress passed an act "providing for a permanent National Arsenal at Indianapolis". The current location was chosen by army planners because it had close access to downtown Indianapolis, but was also far enough outside the city limits that it would not disrupt any neighborhoods.

The first soldiers arrived in 1865. The location was used to store heavy artillery, lighter arms, and some munitions, and was maintained by the United States government until 1903. About fifteen different commanders and fifty soldiers were stationed at the Arsenal during its years of operation.

=== Winona Technical Institute ===
After the Spanish–American War, arsenals were considered obsolete for military needs, and there was a nationwide trend towards their abandonment; in addition, the city of Indianapolis had fully encroached on the site at the time. As a result, in 1903, the title to the Arsenal grounds was sold at public auction to an Indianapolis public trust, which aimed to keep the property intact as the site of a school or park.

In 1904, the Winona Agricultural and Technical Institute established an Indianapolis school on the site. The Indianapolis public trust planned to execute the deed to the Institute upon proof of sufficient endowment; however, a 1909 investigation made it clear that the institute was insolvent. As a result, a case was filed and venued to the Hendricks County Circuit Court by the Indianapolis public trust. Following years of litigation, including an appeal to the Indiana Supreme Court, a 1916 ruling gave the site to the Indianapolis Public Schools district, which had expressed interest in the site.

=== Arsenal Technical High School ===
The Indianapolis Public Schools district had been leasing the site since 1912, although it was granted the site's title in 1916. The school district operated Arsenal Technical Schools (now known as Arsenal Technical High School). Milo H. Stuart, the principal of Manual Training High School, opened Arsenal Technical High School on the grounds as the school's inaugural principal.

The school occupies many extant buildings original to the days of the site's usage as an Arsenal. Regardless, in the decades following the opening of the school, many new buildings were added to accommodate the school's functions. These buildings include Stuart Hall and the Howard Longshore Stadium, which were built using New Deal funds. The most recent building addition to the campus was in 2012, with the opening of a community center known as the Chase Legacy Building.

== Academic programs ==
Arsenal Technical offers four academic programs at the school. These include the New Tech program, the Math and Science program, the Law and Public Policy program, and the Career Technology Center.

=== New Tech ===
The New Tech program is a project-based program in a technology-driven, college preparatory environment, with resources provided by the New Tech Network. Students can take both dual credit and Advanced Placement courses, and are provided with individual laptops.

=== Math and Science ===
The Math and Science program is a traditional college-preparatory program with a focus on the STEM field. Students are offered double blocks in science as well as Advanced Placement courses. Students can explore a number of pathways ranging from engineering to biomedical sciences to information technology.

=== Law and Public Policy ===
The Law and Public Policy program is a humanities program with a focus on law-based education. Students can take Advanced Placement courses, participate in mock trial and student court programs, and take specific courses in the law field such as Street Law, Law Education, Speech, and Debate. The program also has partnerships with several institutions of high education including Butler University, the Indiana University McKinney School of Law, and Vincennes University.

=== Career Technology Center ===
The Career Technology Center is a vocational program offering both academic- and career-based pathways. These programs range from Fire and Rescue to Automotive Services. Certain pathways operate businesses on the school campus; the Cosmetology pathway operates a salon, and the Culinary Arts pathway operates a restaurant in the West Residence known as the Colonel's Cupboard.

== Buildings ==
=== 19th century ===
A number of extant buildings date back to the history of the site's usage as a U.S. Civil War arsenal. As a result of the age, history, and significance of these buildings, the school is listed on the National Register of Historic Places.

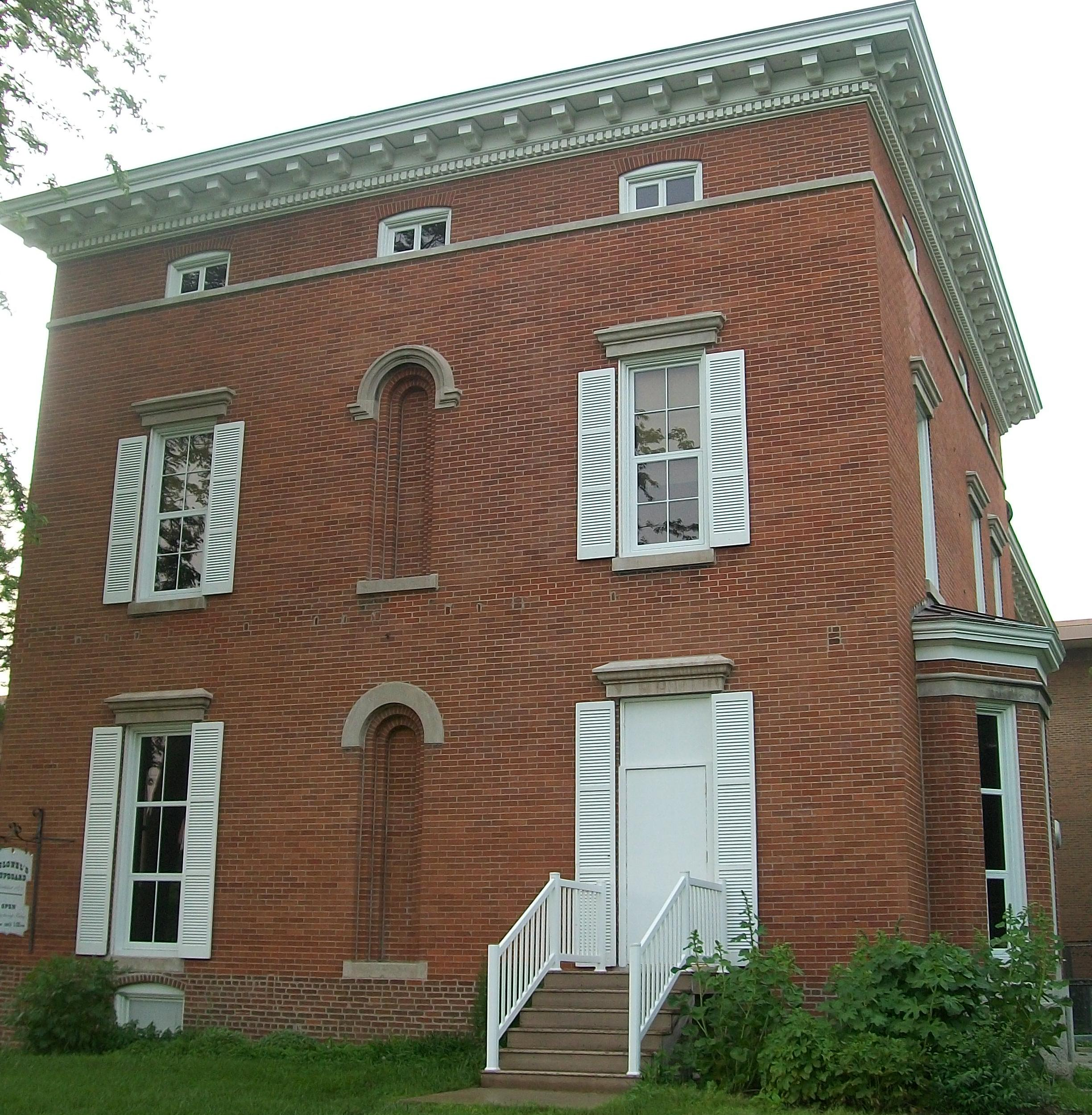
The West Residence

The guardhouse

The Arsenal building, also known as the Main building, was constructed in 1864. It is a three-story building which originally served as a storehouse. Wagons would pull up under the seven-story tower and be hoisted up by a platform lift. Once in place, rifles, cannon, or other materiel was unloaded at the appropriate floor.

The Powder Magazine was built in 1866, and was used to store gunpowder and other volatile substances. According to stories at the time, children along the nearby street would run past when they neared the building, fearing an explosion.

The Barracks were constructed in 1867, and housed the detachment of fifty soldiers that staffed the Arsenal. The building now houses the school's Junior Reserve Officer Training Corps (JROTC) program.

The Barn, later renamed Allen Hall, housed the horses used by the military.

The West Residence, constructed in 1870, accommodated officers, and now houses the Colonel's Cupboard, a public, student-run restaurant.

The Guard House, constructed in 1872, also contains cells used to house military offenders.

=== 20th and 21st century ===
In the decades following the opening of the campus as Arsenal Technical High School, a number of additional buildings were built to accommodate the school's functions.

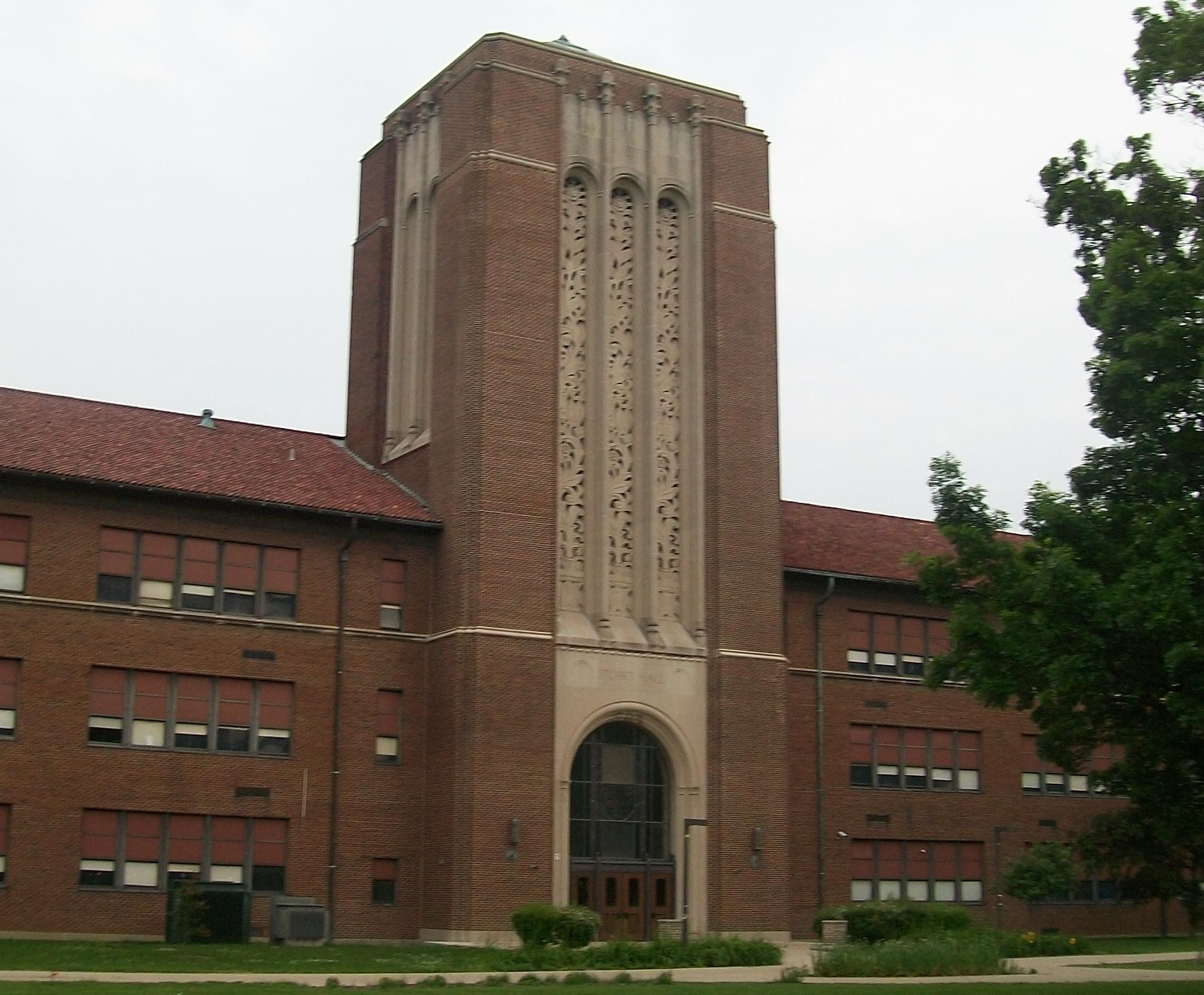
The Stuart Hall bell tower is one of the tallest structures on campus, matched only by the Arsenal.

Treadwell Hall was constructed in 1921 and was the second building addition to the new school, and the only one still standing. The original officer's East Residence was demolished in 1929 after two wings were added to Treadwell Hall in 1928.

Lone Hall was constructed in 1922, and was originally known as the Power and Shop Building. It housed the school's power plant and vocational classes.

Stuart Hall was built in 1939. The building holds a resemblance to the Arsenal building, with red brick walls accented by white stone trim. The building also contains a memorial entrance tower with stained glass, commemorative wall artwork, and a bust depicting the building's namesake, Milo H. Stuart. On the third floor of the tower is a carillon, which plays during the school's passing periods.

The Howard Longshore Stadium is where the school's football team has its games and where the marching band, track and field, and cross country teams practice. It includes a running track which circumscribes it, as well as concrete bleachers on each side.

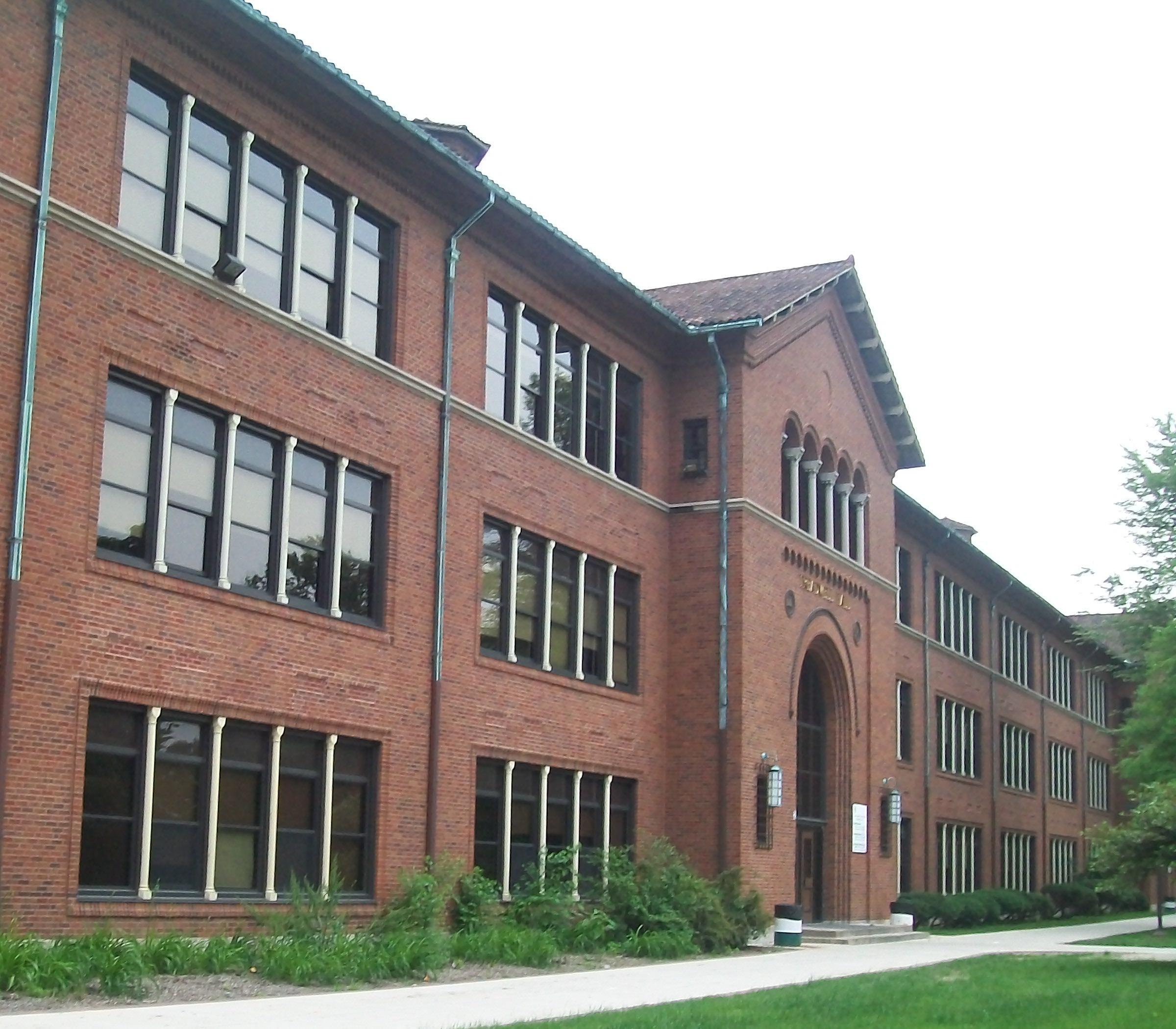
Part of the front facade of Treadwell Hall

Morgan Hall, named after former principal DeWitt S. Morgan, was dedicated in 1958. The building was created to house additional vocational classes.

Moon Hall, constructed in 1965, houses the kitchen and cafeteria on the first floor, and the music department on the second.

The Hanson H. Anderson Auditorium, constructed in 1978, is the school's main auditorium, and the school's plays and special classes, such as set design, are held.

The East Gym, which includes a swimming pool, was constructed in 1978, then known as the Girl's Gym.

The Cecil L. McClintock Media Center was constructed in 1978, and consists of a library, bookstore, and an outdoor amphitheater adjacent to the building. The building also contains the Tech Centennial Museum, which opened in 2012.

The Legacy Center, formally known as the Chase Legacy Building, opened in 2012. The community center has a fitness facility, art studio, garden, greenhouse, and instructional kitchen. The funds used for the construction of the building were included in Indianapolis' successful bid for the 2012 Super Bowl.

== Former principals ==
- Milo H. Stuart was the founder and first principal of Arsenal Technical High School, serving from 1912 until 1930. When Stuart opened the school in 1912, he was also serving as the principal of Manual Training High School. In 1916, however, Stuart was "relieved of his double responsibility" and formally appointed as the first principal of Arsenal Technical, following an Indiana State Supreme Court which gave Indianapolis Public Schools the deed to the Arsenal site. Under his tenure, Stuart oversaw the development of the Arsenal Technical curriculum; the remodeling of old government buildings on the site; the construction of the Arsenal, the Shops, and the Gymnasium; and the development of a lasting vision and direction for the school's operation. In 1930, Milo Stuart became assistant superintendent of Indianapolis Public Schools. He died three years later, and Stuart Hall was dedicated in his honor in 1940.
- DeWitt S. Morgan was the second principal of Arsenal Technical High School, serving from 1930 until 1937, when he was appointed superintendent of Indianapolis Public Schools. Prior to his appointment as Arsenal Tech principal, he served as a history teacher, and later vice principal, at the school. Morgan Hall is named in his honor.
- Hanson H. Anderson was the third principal of Arsenal Technical High School, serving from 1937 until 1958. Anderson was one of the first teachers employed at the school in 1912, although he was later the head of the Mathematics department as well as a vice principal. Under his tenure, Anderson oversaw the erection and dedication of Stuart Hall. The Hanson H. Anderson auditorium is named in his honor.

== Notable alumni ==
- Howard H. Aiken (1919), a "father of the computer age" who conceived then helped create world's first large-scale computer, IBM's Harvard Mark I
- Frank Baird (1930), All-American basketball player at Butler, professional with the Indianapolis Kautskys
- André Carson (c. 1992), U.S. Congressman Indiana's 7th Congressional District (Indianapolis / Marion County) 2009–present
- Enoch DeMar (c. 1998), NFL football player
- Leroy Edwards (1933), NCAA basketball All-American at Kentucky, six-time all-league center in National Basketball League
- Mike Epps (c. 1988), comedian and actor
- Mel Garland (1960), Purdue Boilermakers basketball player, IUPUI Jaguars men's basketball head coach
- Howard Garns (1922), creator of the Sudoku numbers puzzle
- Joseph Hayes (1936) The Desperate Hours best-selling novelist, Tony Award-winning playwright, Edgar Award-winning screenwriter
- Freddie Hubbard (b. 1938), Grammy Award-winning modern jazz and bebop trumpeter
- Robert Indiana (b. Robert Clark) (1946), Love (sculpture) artist associated with Pop Art movement
- Jimmy Jackson (1930), racing driver, finished 2nd in the 1946 Indianapolis 500.
- Bill Justice (1931), Disney animator of Thumper the rabbit and chipmunks Chip 'n' Dale, programmed figures for Disney attractions Pirates of the Caribbean, the Haunted Mansion, and Country Bear Jamboree
- Frank Kendrick (1970), Purdue University, NBA basketball player; college and CBA coach
- Durward Kirby (1930), TV personality, The Garry Moore Show and co-host of Candid Camera television shows
- Sylvia Likens (attended c. 1965), victim of torture-murderer Gertrude Baniszewski
- Peter Lupus (1950), actor in original Mission: Impossible television show and champion bodybuilder
- Trey Lyles (2014), Indiana Mr. Basketball; former basketball player at University of Kentucky, Tech's all-time leading scorer and rebounder.
- Bill Peet (b. William Bartlett Peed) (1933), Disney animator/story writer, Dumbo character creator, 101 Dalmatians screenwriter, best-selling children's author
- Mike Price (1966), University of Illinois basketball player, 17th pick of 1970 NBA draft; brother of Jim Price
- Jim Price, NBA basketball player; head coach of IUPUI Jaguars women's basketball team; brother of Mike Price
- Bruce Charles Savage (c. 1924), headed U.S. Public Housing Administration (now HUD) in Eisenhower Administration
- Joe Sexson (1952), Indiana Mr. Basketball; basketball and baseball player, coach; Purdue, Butler
- Alan B. Somers (1959), All American swimming competitor for Indiana University and for the U.S. Olympic team in the 1960 Rome Olympics in the 400 and 1500-meter freestyle events. Later served as a greater Bloomington, Indiana area neurologist.
- Jay Stewart (b. Jay Fix) (1934), announcer on Let's Make a Deal and other television game shows
- John Townsend, University of Michigan basketball player
- Landon Turner (1978), Indiana Hoosiers basketball player and National Basketball Association draft pick
- Thelma Van Norte (1927), medical records librarian in Georgia
- Dick Weber (b. 1929), professional bowler, founding member of Professional Bowlers Association (PBA)

== See also ==
- List of schools in Indianapolis
- National Register of Historic Places listings in Center Township, Marion County, Indiana
- List of high schools in Indiana
