= Bruce Savage (disambiguation) =

Bruce Savage may refer to:

- Bruce Savage (born 1960), American soccer player
- Bruce Savage (sailor) (born 1962), South African sailor
- Bruce Charles Savage (1906–1993), American businessman
