= Edwin Holt Hughes =

American bishop

Edwin Holt Hughes (December 7, 1866 – February 12, 1950) was an American bishop of the Methodist Episcopal Church, elected in 1908.

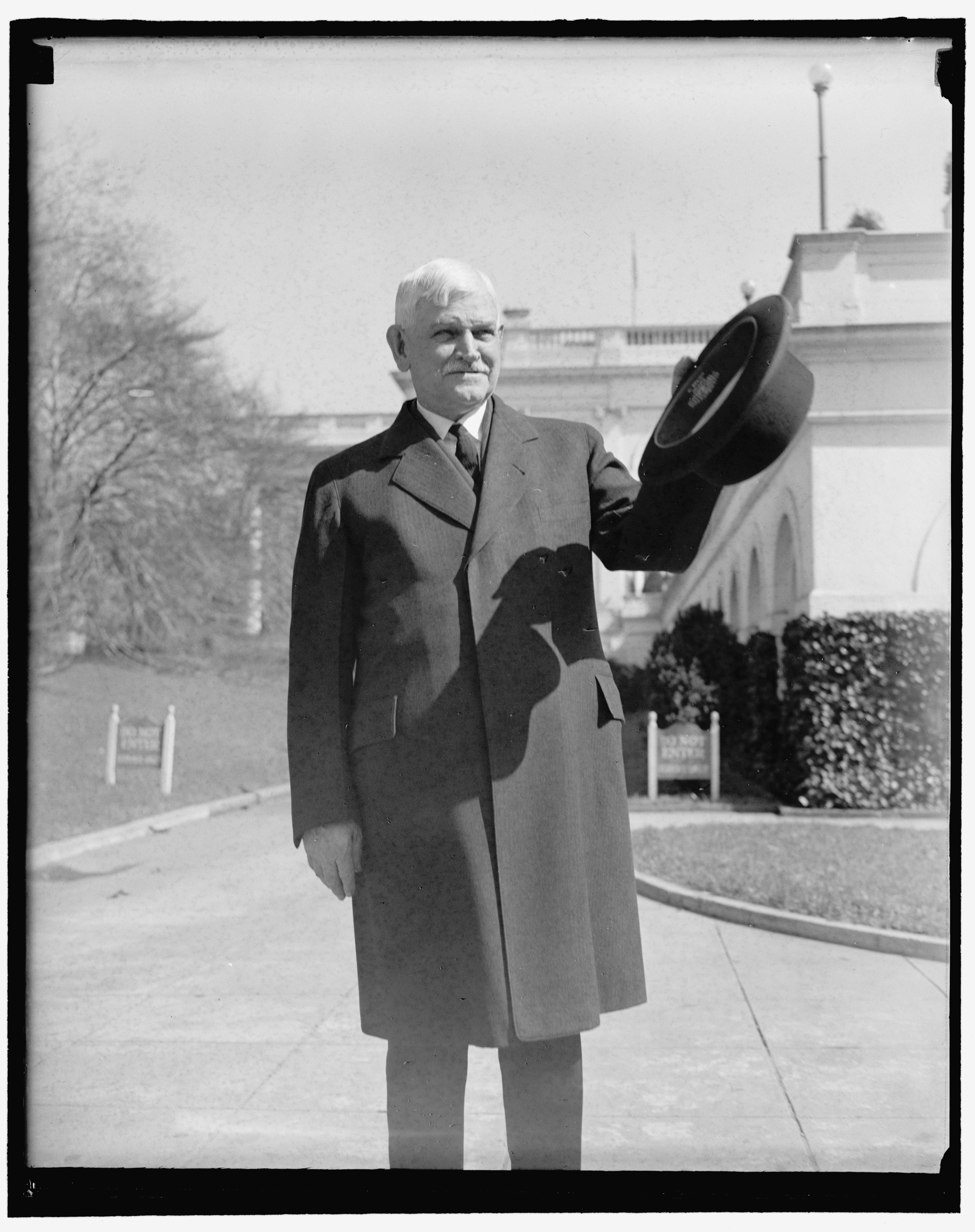

== Birth and family ==
Edwin was born in Moundsville, West Virginia, the son of the Rev. Thomas B. and Louisa (Holt) Hughes. One of his brothers, Matthew Simpson Hughes, was also a Methodist bishop. He married Isabel Ebbert on 8 June 1892. She predeceased him. They had six children: Isabel, Holt, Ebbert, Caroline, Anna Louise, and Francis.

== Education ==
He studied at West Virginia University beginning in 1887, graduating from Ohio Wesleyan University in 1889 (A.B. degree) and 1892 (A.M. degree). He then attended Boston University School of Theology, 1889–92.

== Ministry ==
Rev. Hughes began preaching in 1886. He was pastor at Newton Centre, Massachusetts (1892–96), and at Malden, Massachusetts (1896–1903).

He then became the president of DePauw University, Greencastle, Indiana, in 1903. As president he worked on promoting student discipline and reducing the university's financial deficits. By the time Hughes left office, the university's endowment had more than doubled, from $231,000 to $530,000. His term as president ended in 1909 shortly after assuming the work of a bishop.

Rev. Hughes was elected president of the State Teachers' Association of Indiana for the year 1904.

Hughes was made a bishop in 1908 and assigned to the San Francisco area. In 1916, he was transferred to Boston. From 1924 to 1932, he was the bishop of Chicago. He then served as the bishop of Washington, D.C. until his retirement in 1940. Following the death of his successor, Adna Wright Leonard, Hughes served as bishop of the D.C. area for another two years.

In addition, he served as a trustee of Boston University, American University, Dickinson College, Ohio Wesleyan, Northwestern University, and DePauw. He was the president of the Religious Committee of the Panama Pacific Exposition (1910–11). Hughes served as acting chancellor of American University in 1923, where the dormitory building Hughes Hall is now named in his honor. From 1936 to 1941, he was the head of the Methodist Board of Temperance, Prohibition, and Public Morals. In 1941, he was chairman of the church's war commission. He also served as a member of the Muhlenberg Bicentennial Commission in 1942.

He was a fraternal delegate to Irish and English Methodism in 1930, representing American Methodism. He was the senior chairman of the Methodist Unification Commission (1938–40), that ultimately accomplished the reunion of the three major Methodist bodies in the U.S. in 1939.

In retirement, Bishop Hughes lived in Chevy Chase, Maryland. He was taken ill for the final time while on a speaking engagement in Muncie, Indiana. He died on February 12, 1950, of viral pneumonia after two weeks in a hospital in Washington, D.C.

== Literary work ==
- Letters on Evangelism (New York, 1906)
- Thanksgiving Sermons (1909)
- The Teaching of Citizenship (1909)
- A Boy's Religion (1914)
- The Bible and Life (1914)

He edited:

- Hauréau, J. B., Les Œuvres de Hugues de Saint Victor (Paris 1886)
- Harnack, Dogma (vol. VI)

== See also ==
- List of bishops of the United Methodist Church

Academic offices
Preceded by Hillary Asbury Gobin	President of DePauw University; 1903–1909	Succeeded by Francis John McConnell
Methodist Church titles
Preceded by John William Hamilton	Methodist Episcopal Bishop of San Francisco; 1908–1916	Succeeded by Adna Wright Leonard
Preceded by John William Hamilton	Methodist Episcopal Bishop of Boston; 1916–1924	Succeeded by William Franklin Anderson
Preceded by Thomas Nicholson	Methodist Episcopal Bishop of Chicago; 1924–1932	Succeeded by Ernest Lynn Waldorf
Preceded by William Fraser McDowell	Methodist Episcopal Bishop of Washington, D.C. 1932–1940	Succeeded by Adna Wright Leonard
Preceded by Adna Wright Leonard	Methodist Episcopal Bishop of Washington, D.C. 1943–1945	Succeeded by Charles Wesley Flint
