= Daniel L. Marsh =

American academic

Daniel L. Marsh (April 12, 1880 – May 20, 1968) was the president of Boston University from 1926 to 1951.

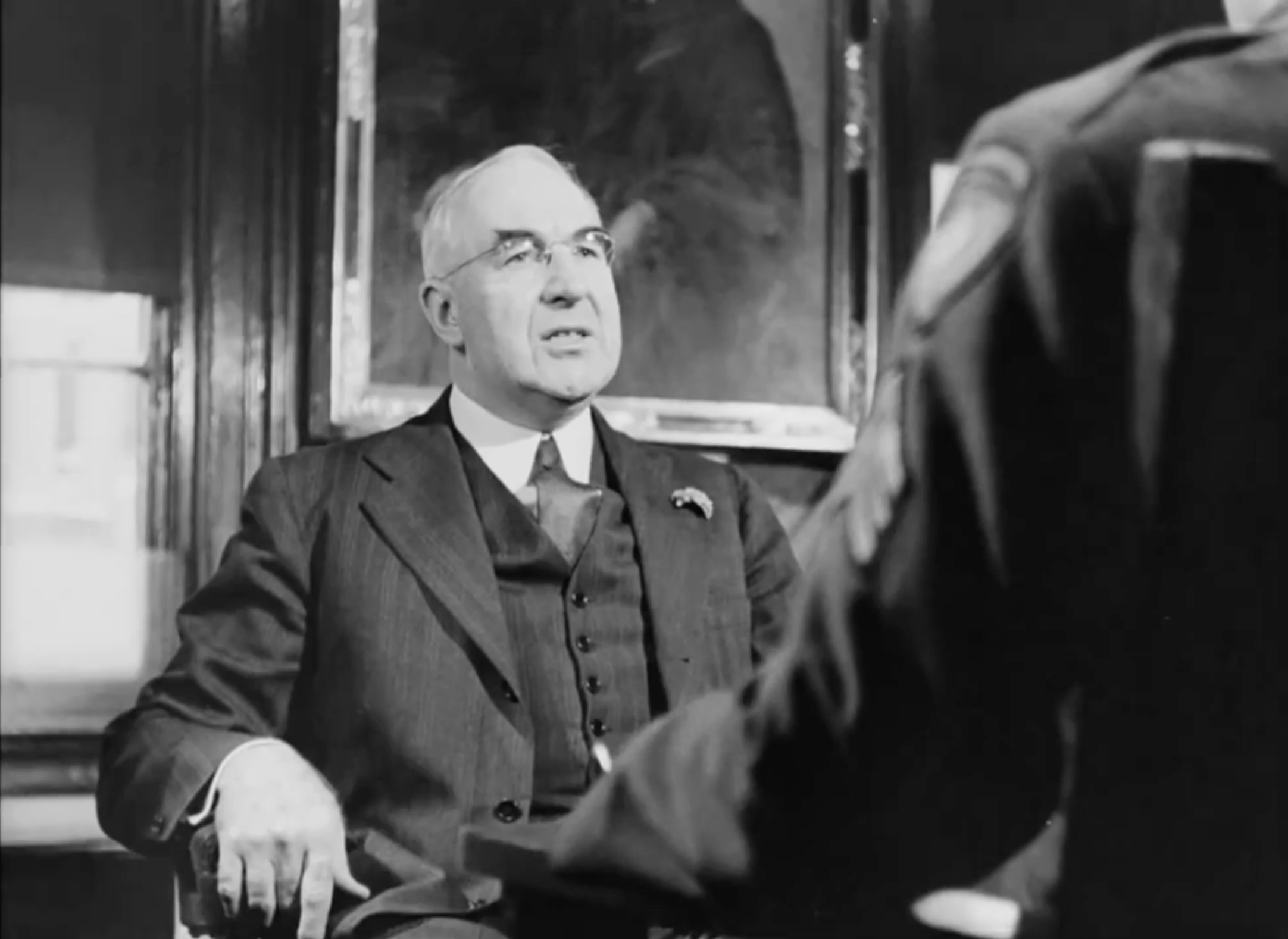
Daniel L. Marsh, third president of Boston University, with Sgt. Harold Russell in the 1945 short film Diary of a Sergeant

== Biography ==
Marsh was raised in Pennsylvania. He became a Methodist preacher before going to study at Northwestern University, where he got an undergraduate degree in 1906 and a master's degree in 1907. He later also studied at Garrett Biblical Institute and Boston University School of Theology.

As president of Boston University, Marsh oversaw the building of a new campus, the merger of Sargent College into the university, and the founding of the School of Social Work the School of Nursing, the School of Public Relations (now the College of Communication), and the General College.

Marsh was a strong proponent of prohibition and advocated for its retention in the 1920s. He was also not a fan of New York (much preferring Boston), so much so that his comments on the city once caused New York Mayor Jimmy Walker to hold a press conference to condemn them.

Marsh Chapel is named after him.

== Sources ==
- Boston University bio of Marsh
- Healea, Christopher Daryl, “The Builder and Maker of the Greater University: A History of Daniel L. Marsh’s Presidency at Boston University, 1926–1951” (Boston University, 2011). Order No. DA3463124.
