= Alexander Graham Bell tower =

Coordinates: 42°21′3.47″N 71°6′22.97″W

The Alexander Graham Bell tower refers to a planned 375-foot (114 m) tower that would have been constructed at Boston University as a tribute to former faculty member Alexander Graham Bell, who invented the telephone while at the university. Intended to sit behind Marsh Chapel on the Charles River, the Collegiate Gothic masonry spire was to be modeled on the tower of St. Botolph's Church in Boston, England, the town from which Boston, Massachusetts takes its name. The tower at St. Botolph's is commonly known as "the Boston Stump."

The tower was first planned in 1920 as part of a unified campus plan, which would have allowed for around 30,000 students, but was cancelled for unknown reasons sometime after 1928, and was still mentioned as being planned in a Works Progress Administration book from 1937. Today, an engraving exists on the theology building that shows the likeness of the planned bell tower.

Another collegiate tower modeled after the Boston stump, Harkness Tower at Yale University, was completed around the time that the Alexander Graham Bell tower was planned.
