= Marsh Chapel =

Coordinates: 42.3507°N 71.1064°W

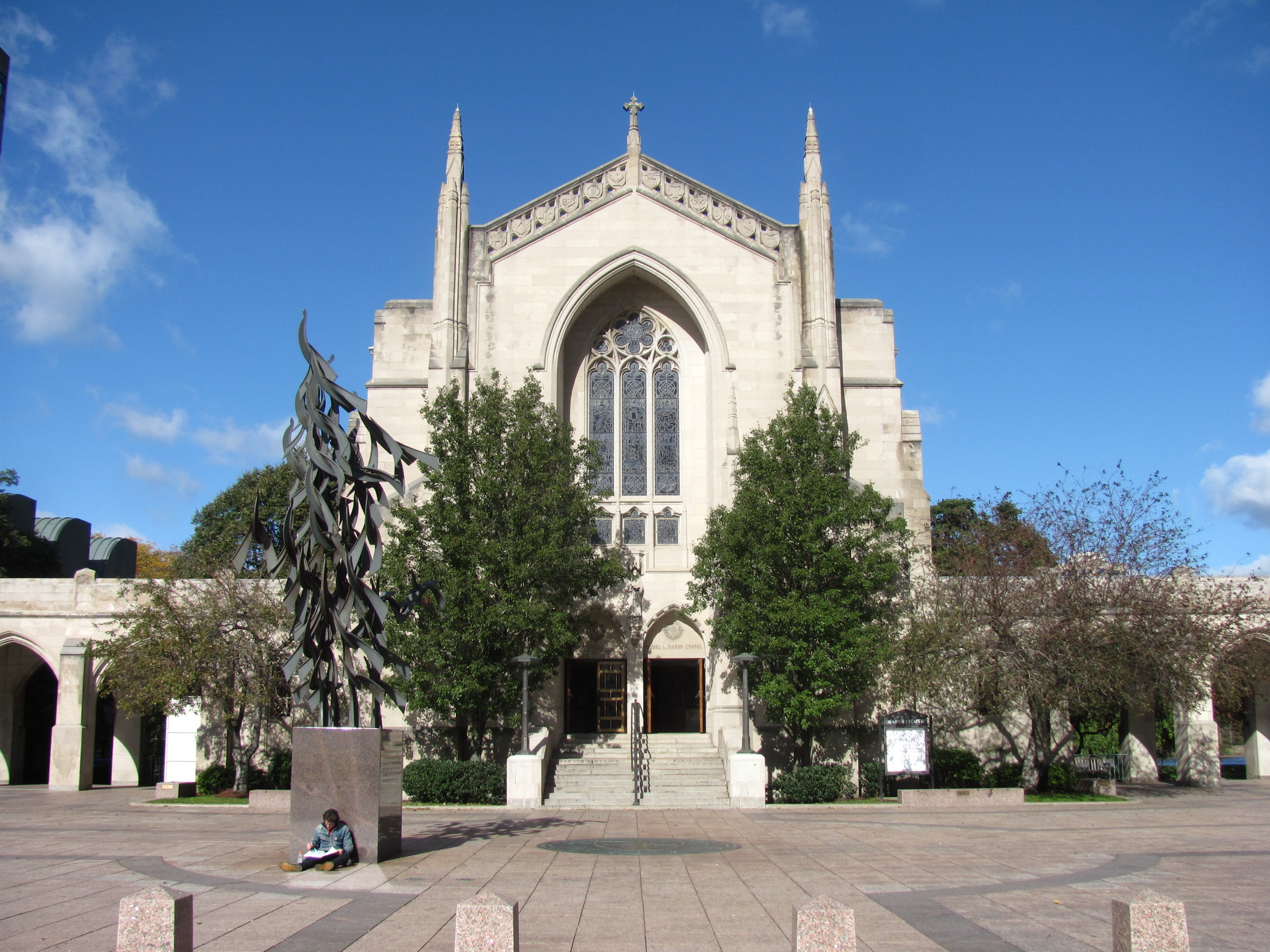
- Exterior of chapel
- Marsh Chapel
- Location: Boston, Massachusetts
- Country: United States
- Denomination: Non-denominational

Architecture
- Functional status: Active
- Architect: Ralph Adams Cram
- Architectural type: Chapel
- Style: Gothic revival
- Groundbreaking: 1949
- Completed: 1950

Clergy
- Dean: Robert Hill

Marsh Chapel is a building on the campus of Boston University used as the official place of worship of the school. It was named for Daniel L. Marsh, a former president of BU and a Methodist minister. The building is Gothic in style.

While Methodism, the university's historical denomination, exerts a great influence on the chapel, it is formally non-denominational. The current dean of Marsh Chapel is Rev. Dr. Robert Hill, an ordained elder in The United Methodist Church.

== History ==
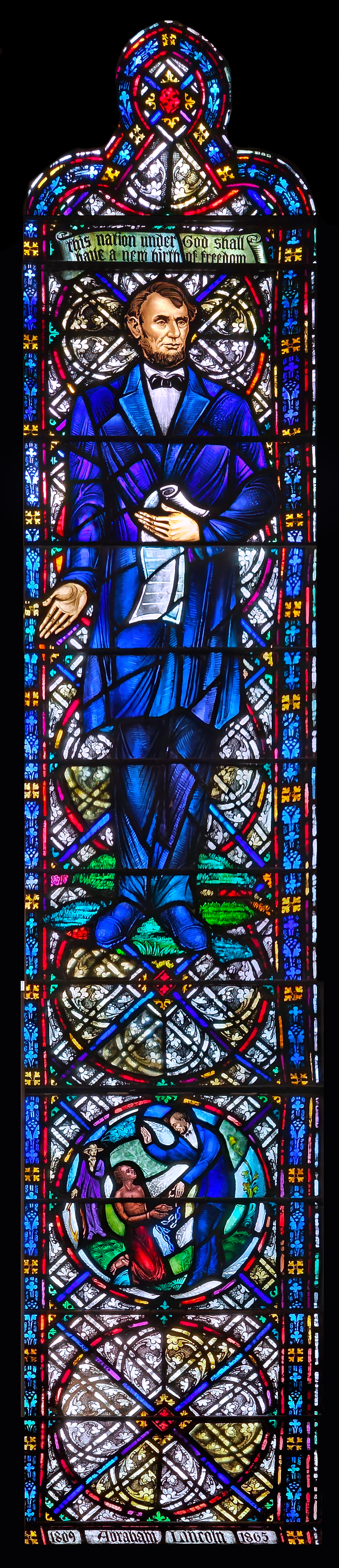
Lincoln Window by Charles Connick

Plans for a riverside chapel at the university were made as early as 1920, when the university purchased the 15-acre (0.061 km^{2}) Charles River Campus and commissioned a master plan from architect Ralph Adams Cram. Originally, the chapel was to be complemented by the Alexander Graham Bell tower, a Gothic Revival administrative structure named for the inventor of the telephone and other innovations.

The chapel was not constructed until after the Great Depression and Second World War. Ralph Adams Cram was selected as its architect. He designed the building in the Gothic style. The building was dedicated in 1950. Because of competition from Modernist and other architectural influences, the chapel marked the end of a period of Collegiate Gothic construction on American campuses.

== Good Friday experiment ==
The chapel was the site of the Marsh Chapel Experiment on Good Friday in 1962. Researchers studying human thought included Walter Pahnke; Timothy Leary, a Harvard professor and later psychedelic guru; and Richard Alpert (who would later become known as Ram Dass).

== Influence on Civil Rights Movement ==
Between 1953 and 1965, African-American theologian Howard Thurman presided the chapel as its dean. Thurman exerted an enormous influence on the work of Civil Rights Movement leader Martin Luther King Jr., who studied at Boston University.

== Other notable figures associated with Marsh Chapel ==
- Robert Cummings Neville, one of the Boston Confucians, served as a dean of the chapel
