= Thelma Van Norte =

American medical librarian

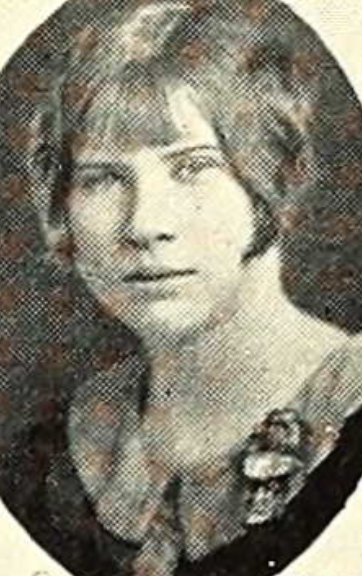
- Thelma Augostat (later Van Norte), from the 1927 yearbook of Arsenal Technical High School in Indianapolis
- Born: Thelma Louise Augostat; January 12, 1912; Indianapolis, Indiana, U.S.
- Died: August 9, 1985 (aged 73); Sandersville, Georgia, U.S.
- Other name: Thelma Schindledecker
- Occupations: Medical librarian, medical transcriptionist

Thelma Louise Van Norte (née Augostat; January 12, 1912 – August 9, 1985) was an American medical records librarian. She received the National Public Personnel Award in 1966, from the President's Committee on Employment of the Handicapped, for her work in training blind medical transcriptionists.

== Early life and education ==
Thelma Louise Augostat was born in Indianapolis, the daughter of Otto Augostat and Maud Wilson Augostat. Her father was a plumber. She graduated from Arsenal Technical High School in 1927, at age 15. She earned a bachelor's degree from Indiana University and a master's degree from Georgia Women's College. She trained as a medical records librarian at Emory University Hospital. She held an Bachelor of Laws degree from the Woodrow Wilson College of Law.

== Career ==
Thelma Augostat played violin in a trio as a young woman. She became medical records librarian at a hospital in Macon, Georgia in 1959. There, Van Norte established a training program for blind medical transcriptionists. She was also a consultant to USAID, and spent time in British Guiana, teaching and establishing a medical records library at a hospital for leprosy patients. In the 1970s, she worked on contacting families of deceased Central State Hospital patients. "We just hunt, hunt, hunt until we get a clue," she explained in a 1973 newspaper article.

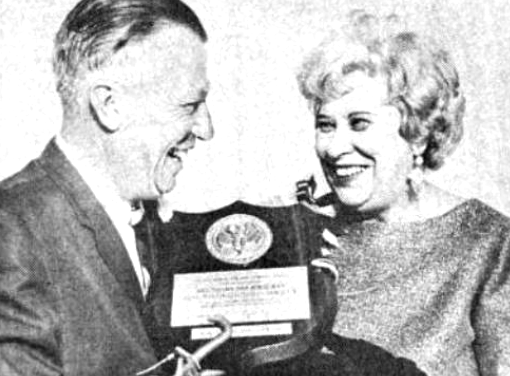
Harold Russell and Thelma Van Norte, from a 1966 publication of the President's Committee on Employment of the Handicapped

Van Norte received the 1966 Georgia State Public Personnel Award, and the National Public Personnel Award from the President's Committee on Employment of the Handicapped. The national award was presented to her by actor Harold Russell at a banquet in Milwaukee.

== Personal life ==
Thelma Augostat married physician William M. Schindledecker in 1932; they had two sons, Samuel and Robert, and divorced in 1946. She married again, to Lloyd F. Van Norte, before 1950. He was postmaster of Edisto Island, South Carolina. She died in 1985, at the age of 73, at a hospital in Sandersville, Georgia.
