= Neptune, Ohio =

Unincorporated community in Ohio, U.S.

Coordinates: 40°36′11″N 84°29′30″W

Neptune is an unincorporated community in Center Township, Mercer County, Ohio, United States.

== History ==
Neptune was laid out in 1837. A post office was established at Neptune in 1839, and remained in operation until 1905.

== Notable person ==
- Lemuel Herbert Murlin, a president of Boston University, was born near Neptune in 1861.
