= Lemuel Herbert Murlin =

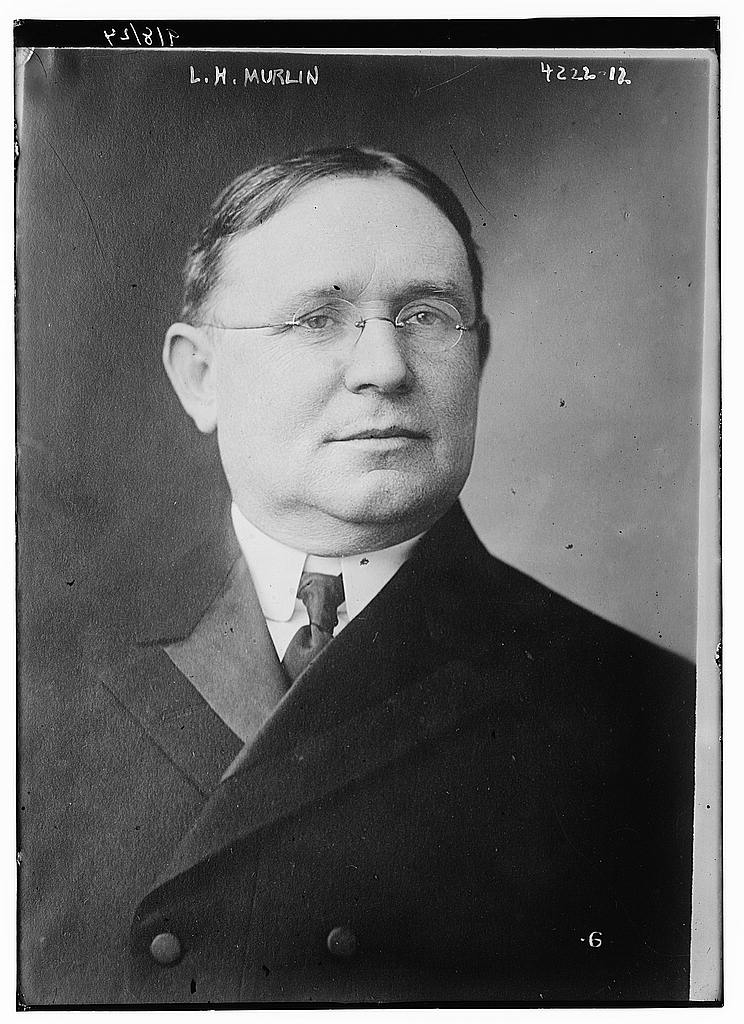
- Murlin in 1917

President of Depauw University
- In office 1924–1928
- Preceded by: George Richmond Grose
- Succeeded by: Garfield Bromley Oxnam

President of Boston University
- In office 1911–1924
- Preceded by: William Edwards Huntington
- Succeeded by: Daniel Lash Marsh

President of Baker University
- In office 1893–1911

Personal details
- Born: November 16, 1861 Neptune, Ohio
- Died: June 20, 1935 (aged 73) Wayland, Michigan

Lemuel Herbert Murlin (November 16, 1861 – June 20, 1935), was the third president of Boston University.

== Biography ==
He was born on November 16, 1861, in Neptune, Ohio, to Orlando Murlin and Esther Hankins.

He became president of Baker University in Kansas in 1893. He was named the third president of Boston University in 1911.

In 1924 he became the president of DePauw University and served until 1928 when he retired due to ill health, and was replaced by Garfield Bromley Oxnam.

He died on June 20, 1935, in Wayland, Michigan, predeceasing by four years his wife, whom he had married in 1893.
