= St Botolph's Church, Boston =

Church in Boston, Lincolnshire, England

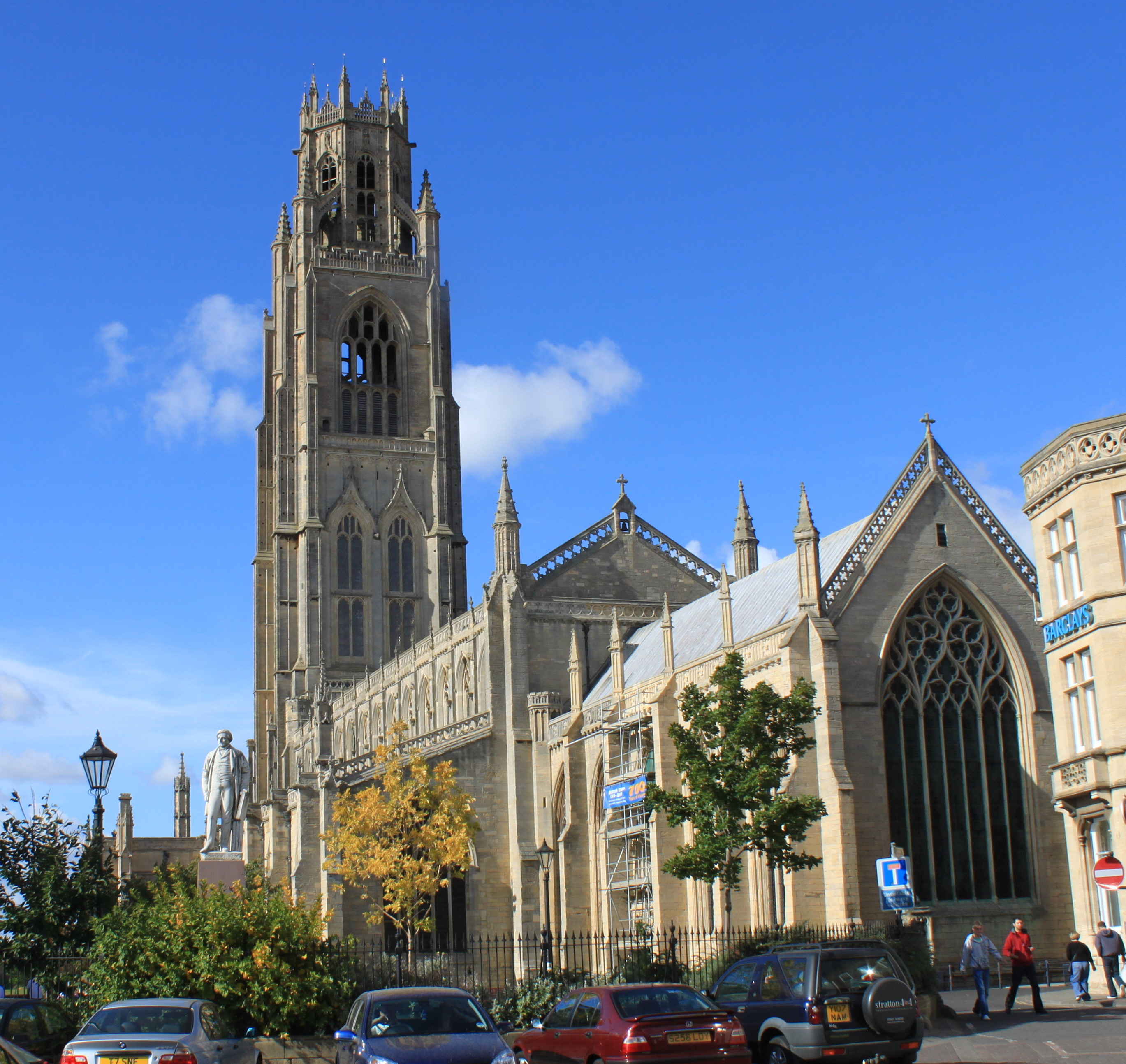
- St Botolph's Church, Boston
- St Botolph's Church, Boston
- 52°58′43″N 0°1′33″W
- OS grid reference: TF 32692 44184
- Location: Boston, Lincolnshire
- Country: England
- Denomination: Church of England
- Previous denomination: Roman Catholic
- Churchmanship: Broad church
- Website: www.parish-of-boston.org.uk

History
- Status: Parish church
- Dedication: St Botolph

Architecture
- Functional status: Active
- Heritage designation: Grade I listed
- Designated: 27 May 1949
- Style: Gothic
- Completed: 1510–1520

Specifications
- Length: 245 feet (75 m)

Administration
- Province: Canterbury
- Diocese: Lincoln
- Archdeaconry: Boston
- Deanery: Holland
- Benefice: Boston
- Parish: Boston

Clergy
- Rector: David Stephenson

St Botolph's Church is the Anglican parish church of Boston, Lincolnshire, England. It has been referred to as "Boston Stump" since it was constructed in the 16th century. Its tower is 266 feet 9 inches (81.31 m) tall, (Note: The figure quoted by Kelly's Directory (1919) was 272 feet and six inches. It has been re-surveyed recently at 266 feet and 9 inches.) and was long used as a landmark for the Boston fishermen; on a clear day it can be seen from Norfolk. The church is a Grade I listed building.

== Background ==
The church has one of the tallest medieval towers in the country, with a height of approximately 266 feet 9 inches (81.31m).

It can be seen for miles around; its prominence accentuated by the flat surrounding countryside known as the Fens. On a clear day, it can be seen from East Anglia on the other side of the Wash. The nickname, Boston Stump (also known as "the Stump"), is often used as a reference to the whole church building or for the parish community housed by it. The formal name is Saint Botolph's Parochial Church of Boston. The name "Boston" is thought to have evolved from "Botolph's Town".

== Earlier buildings ==
Early English legends say that the church was built on the site of a monastery founded by Saint Botolph in 654. As the main source of this account is the Anglo-Saxon Chronicle, it is strongly disputed. Modern historians believe it much more likely that Botolph's monastery was located at Iken in Suffolk.

The Boston Stump is not the first church to have been built on this site. Archaeological evidence indicates that a smaller wooden and stone Norman church had existed on the location of the south aisle of the present building. William Stukeley, the 18th-century antiquary, mentions large stone remains to the south of the church. Excavations during the mid 19th century revealed a Norman stone pillar and a number of coffins from the period.

The small church was inadequate for a booming town with trading revenues to rival London. Trade was across the North Sea with the Low Countries. The town also became a theological centre, with no fewer than four religious houses. In the beginning of the 14th century, the parish began work on a much grander building, more fitting for a prosperous town.

Historically, the transformation from a small church to the equivalent of a continental European cathedral was begun in 1309 under Sir John Truesdale, Vicar of St Botolph's (‘Sir’ being a title of priests at the time). In this period there was change and upheaval across the continent and England following the arrests of the Knights Templar by King Philip the Fair of France on Friday, 13 October 1307.

England became a refuge for many individuals with ties on both sides of the English Channel, and there was a surge in building construction across England. For about the next 20 years, theological determination was disputed among the crown, nobility, and clergy in England. Political turmoil from these events led to the Hundred Years' War and the eventual formation of the Church of England in the 16th century.

== Foundation and architecture ==
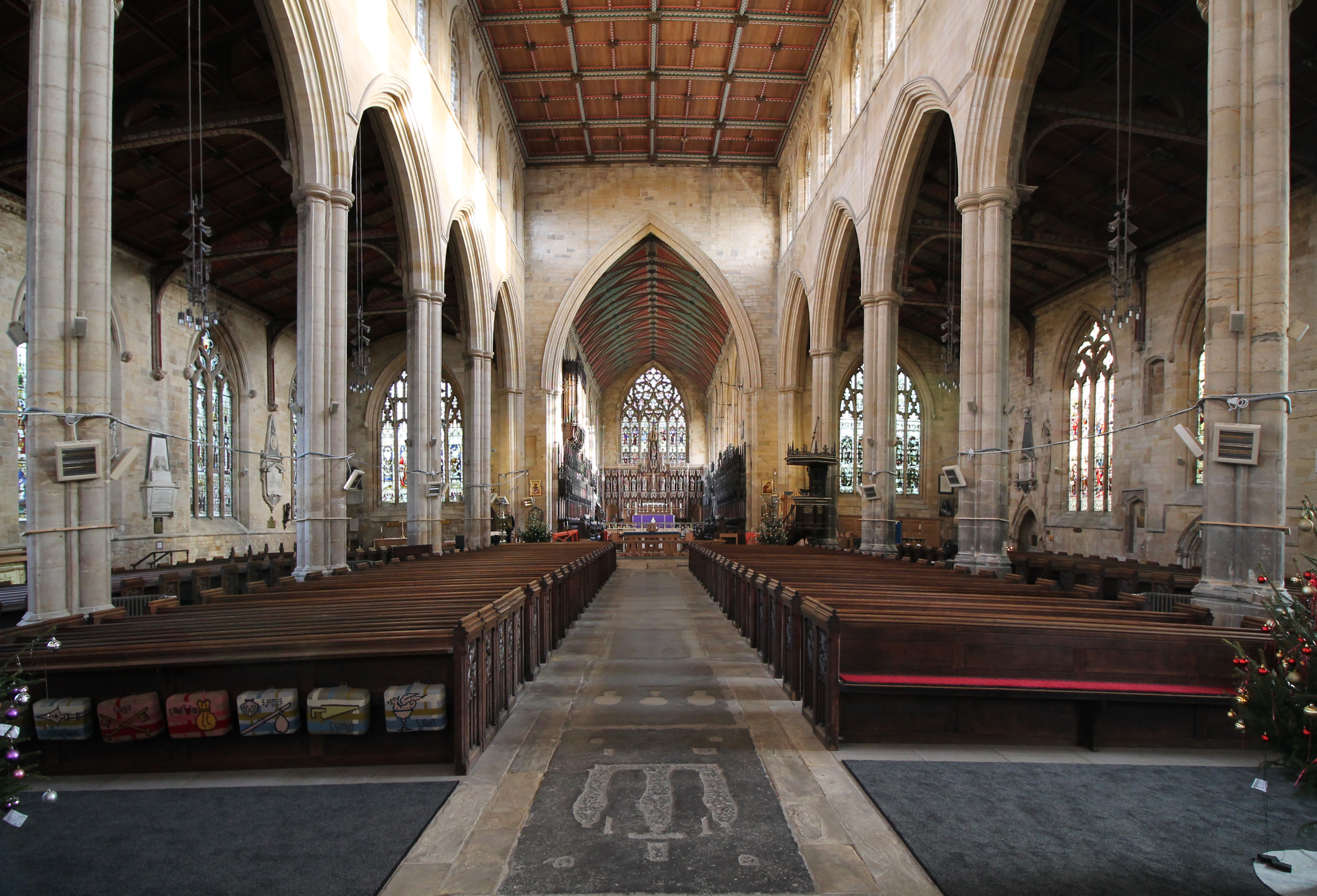
The nave and chancel

The existing church was begun in 1309 at the east end, as was customary. With the chancel built, work reached the south aisle and moved on through the nave until its completion around 1390. Foundation trouble, because of proximity to the river, delayed progress while the chancel was extended to prop the building up and create a greater level of structural stability. The nave piers had been leaning dangerously to the east. This work was successful to the extent that today the tower leans by less than half a centimetre, despite its great height.

The tower was not begun until 1450, by excavation of a deep, wide hole. Indicating the architectural skill employed by the builders at the time, the tower remains structurally solid and has not required any restoration work to realign it despite The Haven being only 33 feet (10 m) away and the original foundations built under water level.

It was completed between 1510 and 1520 in the Perpendicular style that had become popular during much of the 15th century. A walkway at roughly two thirds of the height of the tower encircles the edges, giving great views from the Wash in the east toward Lincoln in the west. Reached by 209 steps, the walkway also provides access to the tower level with the bells.

The tower is topped with a highly decorated octagonal lantern ringed with pinnacles, one of fewer than half a dozen medieval examples surviving in England. Others, including the church of Bury St Edmunds Abbey, are now ruined.

The nave is 242 feet (74 m) long and 104 feet (32 m) wide, making the internal space of the building impressive by its sheer size. It terminates in the vaulted chancel containing the high altar at the extreme eastern end of the church. The church was vaulted in wood in the 18th century, but the nave vaults were removed in the 20th century.

The relatively short period of construction for such a large church is fairly unusual in England, and an indication of the wealth of Boston. Most similarly sized churches, largely cathedrals, took hundreds of years to build due to constant fund shortages, giving them a variety of different styles as exhibited by other East Anglian churches, such as Ely or Peterborough. The Stump was built in less than 150 years, giving it a rare sense of architectural coherence and unity.

=== Misericords ===
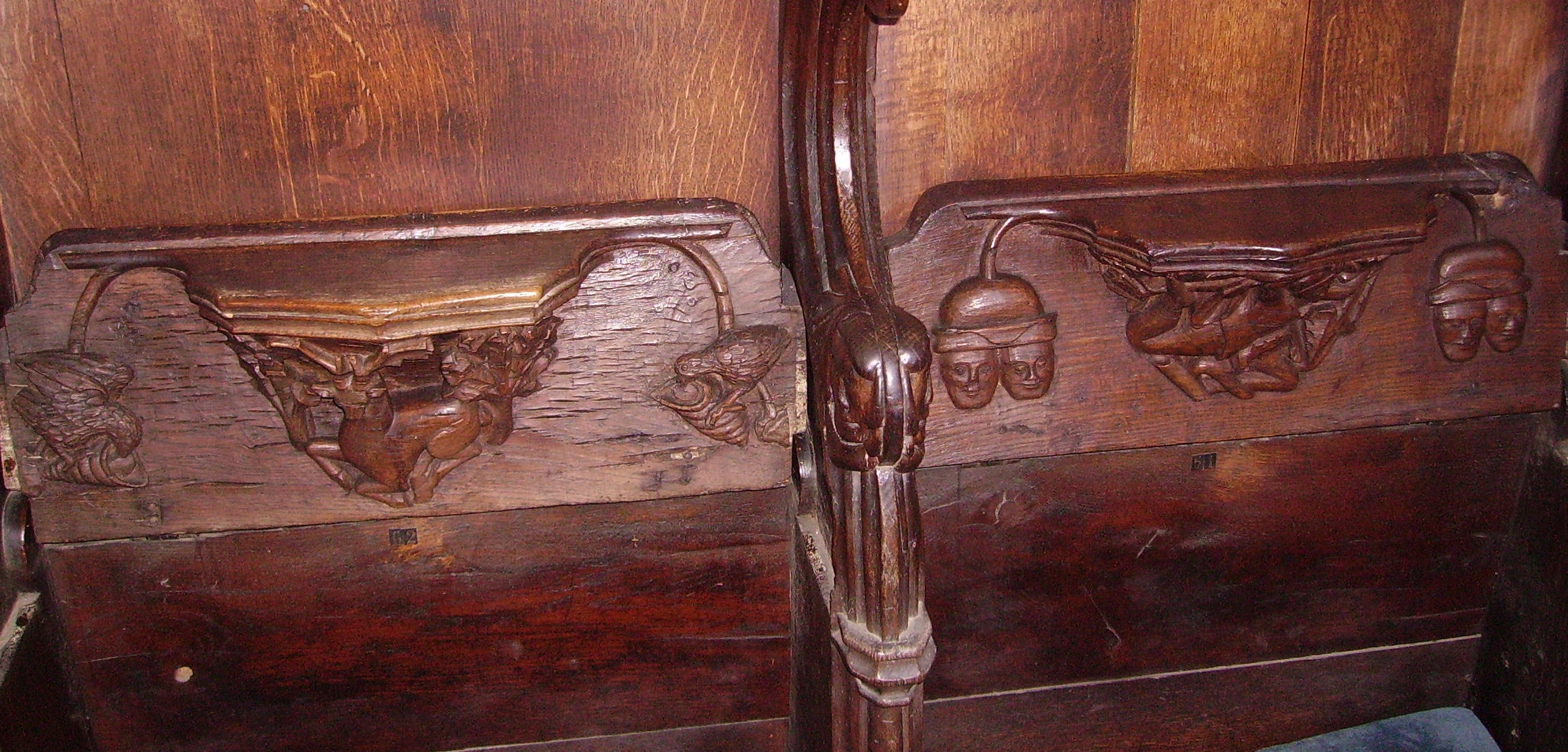
Some misericords

St Botolph's has an array of sixty-two misericords dating from 1390. Subject matter includes mythology, heraldry, and some everyday scenes - NB-02, for instance "Master seated birching a boy who is trying to protect himself with a book. Three other boys are looking on," and NB-03 "Two jesters, each squeezing a cat under its arm and biting its tail".

== Dimensions and statistics ==
St Botolph's Church is the widest parish church in England, the tallest to roof, and also one of the largest by floor area. The very largest by floor area is Holy Trinity Church in Hull, now known as Hull Minster.

- The tower is 266 feet 6 inches (81.23 m) high.
- The walls of the tower are 40 feet (12.2 m)
- Ground level interior height of the tower is 137 feet (41.8 m).
- Views from the top of the tower reach 32 miles (51.5 km).
- Interior space is 20,070 square feet (1,865 m^{2})
- Nave length is 242 feet (74 m).
- Nave width is 104 feet (32 m).

There are many dimensions of the church that correspond with dates in the calendar. The roof is supported by 12 pillars (months), the church has 52 windows (weeks), and 7 doors (days of the week). There are a total of 365 steps to the tip of the tower (days of the year). There are 24 steps to the library (hours) and 60 steps to the roof (minutes and seconds).

== Significance of the tower ==
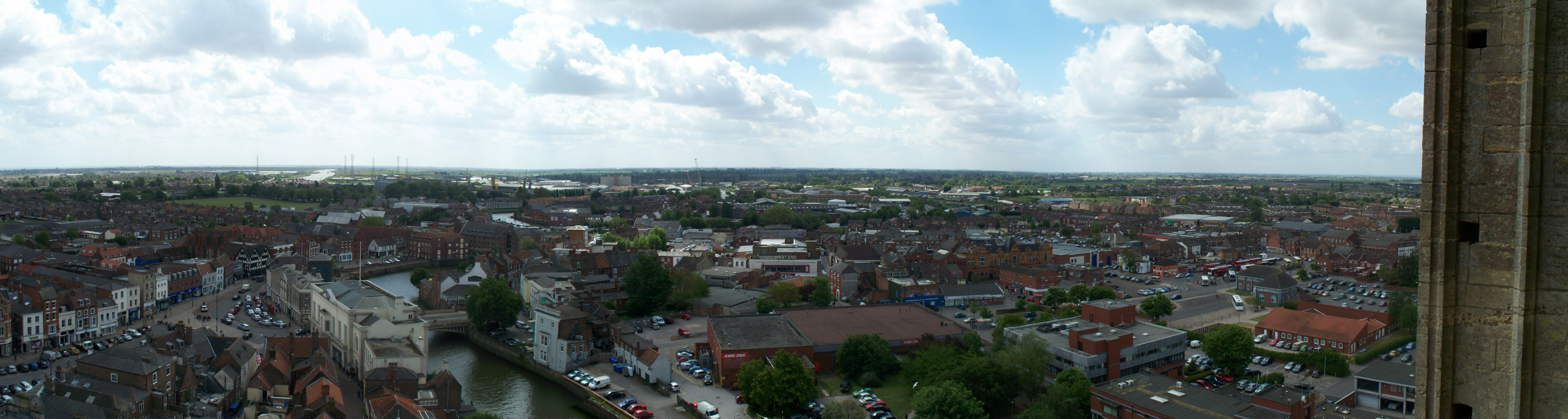
Panorama of Boston taken from the Tower

The tower of St Botolph's Church is 266 feet 6 inches (81.23 m) high, making it the tallest parish church in England to its roof. For the last one hundred and thirty odd years, there have only been 26 bells at the Stump: 15 carillon bells, 10 bells hung for full circle ringing, and the sanctuary bell (or 27 if one includes the old ship's bell).

The tower was used as a marker for travellers on The Fens and in The Wash. It is commonly believed that it was once lit from inside the tower in order to serve this purpose at night as well as during the day. George Jebb's Guide to the Church of St Botolph, with Notes on the History of Boston mentions rings in the tower from which lights could be hung, pointing out that it was a popular practice. The accuracy of this reference is not known. Pishey Thompson, in The History and Antiquities of Boston, quotes from Britton, editor of The Lincolnshire Churches, in the Division of Holland:

The lantern, no doubt, was intended to be lighted at night for a sea-mark. The church of All Saints at York has a lantern very much resembling this of Boston; 'and tradition tells us that anciently a large lamp hung in it, which was lighted in the night time, as a mark for travellers to aim at, in this city. There is still the hook of the pulley on which the lamp hung in the steeple.'

— Drake's York, p. 292.

And Stow tells us that the steeple had five lanterns; to wit, one at each corner, and 'It seemeth that the lanterns on the top of this steeple were meant to have been glazed, and lights in them to have been placed nightly in the winter; whereby travellers to the city might have the better sight thereof, and not miss their way.'

— Survey, p. 542.

The tower became important again in World War II, when Lincolnshire was known as "Bomber County" for its proliferation of air bases. British and American pilots would use The Stump as a signpost to guide them back to base. It also appears that the German Luftwaffe used the tower as a marker, but the town of Boston suffered few bombings.

When floodlighting was recently fitted at The Stump, a great deal of research was done. The yellow lighting of the octagonal lantern was specially put in place to represent the historic use as a marker to guide travellers on land and sea.

=== Architectural influence abroad ===
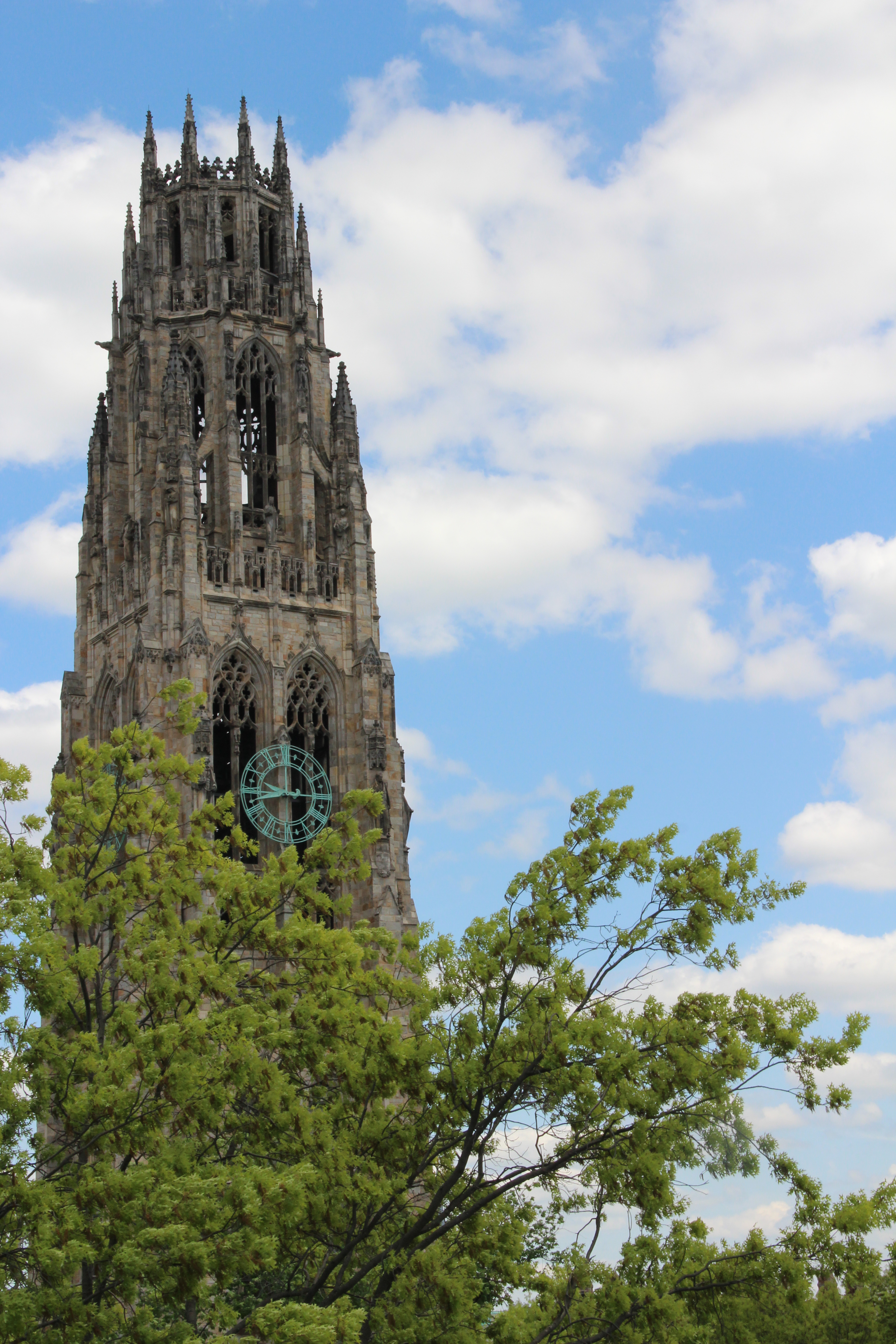
Harkness Tower at Yale University

In the 1920s, the truncated tower inspired the form of several structures during a resurgence of Gothic Revival buildings in the United States. The spire of Harkness Tower at Yale University in New Haven, Connecticut (1921) and Riverside Church (1930) in New York City were the closest exemplars of the original masonry structure. Skyscrapers such as the Chicago Tribune Tower (1925) and New York's American Radiator Building (1926) also took formal cues. In Boston, Massachusetts, so named for St Botolph's parish, Boston University planned its own "Boston stump" in the form of the Alexander Graham Bell tower, but these plans were never realized.

== Clock and chimes ==
The church had chimes which played for around a hundred years until the chiming machinery was allowed to fall out of repair in 1833.

In around 1822 a new clock by Mr. Wynn of Dean Street, London was installed in the church tower.

In 1863, the Mayor of Boston, W. Simonds, initiated a scheme to install chimes in the church tower. In 1864 the celebrated firm of Van Aerschodt, Ainé & Co., bell founders from Louvain, Belgium visited the church to inspect the bells and the capabilities of installing extra bells to implement a complete change of chimes or carillons, using as a model those installations in Antwerp, Liege and other cathedrals.

Once the money had been raised, a contract was placed with Van Aerschodt, Aine & Co. for 36 new bells for the sum of £1,400 (equivalent to £135,520 in 2025). The treble bell dating from 1785 was sent to Louvain to provide the new bells with the key-note.

The clock which was proving unreliable was repaired in 1868 by Gillett and Bland of Croydon who also provided the mechanism to play the chimes and carillon bells. The new bells for the chimes and carillon were installed in the tower on March 1868.

They were not altogether successful and there were complaints that when they had operated, they were inaudible. By 1897 they had been out of order for several years and a scheme was proposed to mark the Diamond Jubilee of Queen Victoria with a new set of chimes and carillon. Gillett & Johnston wrote a report which criticised the small size of the 1868 bells. The largest of the peal only measured 2 feet (0.61 m) across the mouth, and weighed about 3 long hundredweight (150 kg). After an overhaul, the overhaul the chimes were reinstated in 1898 to play every three hours during the day. However, the bells were out of tune, so a decision was taken in 1899 to get the bells recast by Gillett and Johnson of Croydon. The bells were returned to the church from London on the SS Lizzie and Annie and chimed again on 5 November 1899.

The chimes and carillon were silenced at the outbreak of the First World War and were not heard again until after the Second World War. A generous bequest from Councillor Mrs E. L Mawer provided the funds for restoration by Taylor of Loughborough. Eleven new bells with the four existing clock bells provided a chime of 15 bells. The new mechanism provided 35 tunes.

A new tower clock by Gillett & Johnston of Croydon was installed in 1933. It was the first mains-driven A.C. synchronous Westminster chiming clock to be erected in a parish church.

== Bells ==
The old bells were taken to Taylor of Loughborough by train in 1932 for recasting. The tower contains a full circle ring of 10 bells The tenor weight is 2,390 pounds (1,080 kg) and the bells ring in the key of E flat.

== Name ==
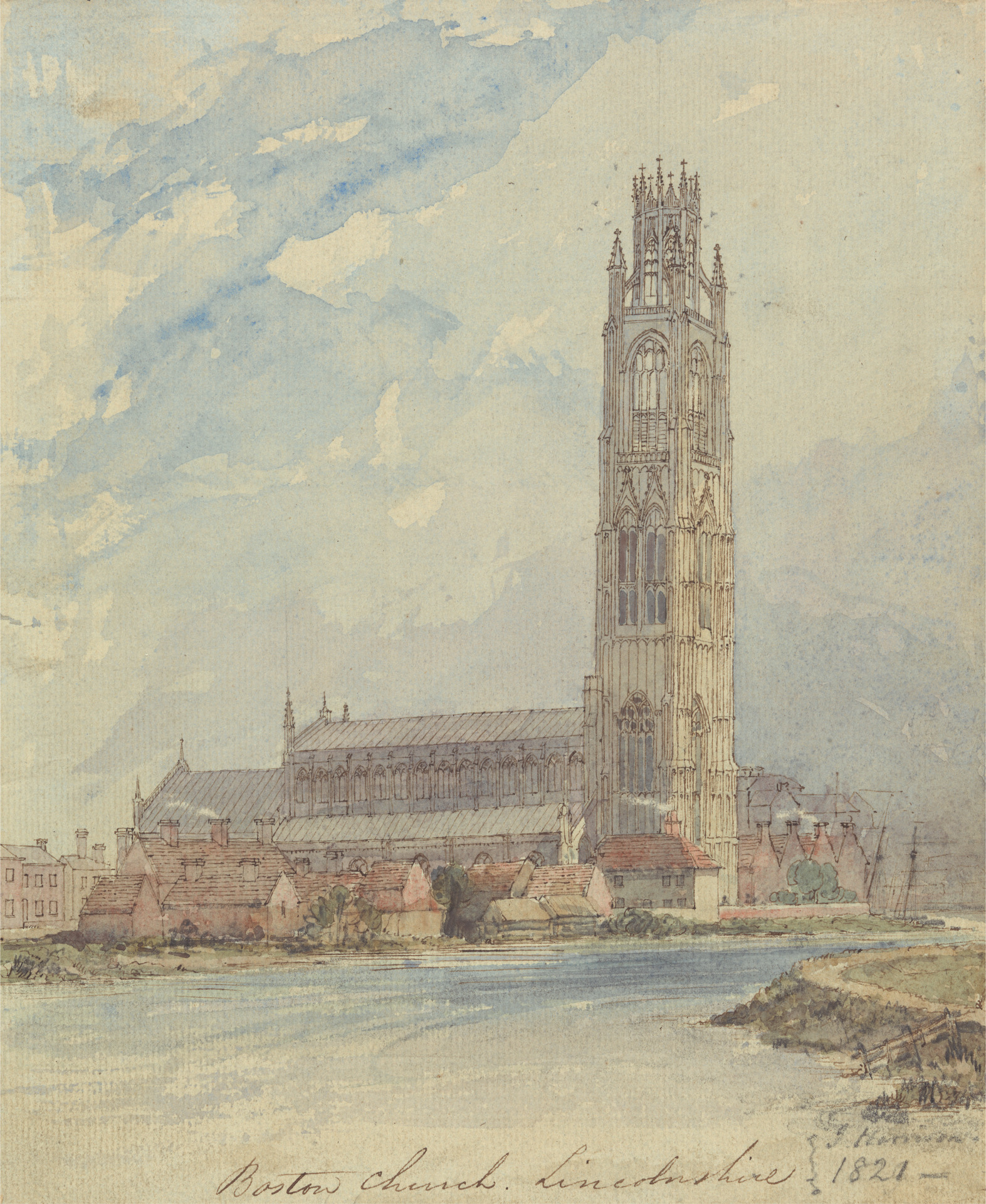
Boston Church, Lincolnshire. Watercolour by James Harrison, 1821. Yale Center for British Art, New Haven, Connecticut.

The official title of the church is "St Botolph's Church of the Parish of Boston", but it is more commonly known as the "Boston Stump", and more simply by locals "the Stump" ever since it was completed. In what is still a matter of debate, there are a number of believed origins of this nickname that at first applied to the tower and is now frequently used to describe the whole church. What is certain is the real roots have long since faded from memory.

The first is that the tower took so long to build it resembled a stump during the construction phase. Seventy years was not, however, a particularly long time for a tower of such height to be built. Many similarly tall structures would be built a level at a time over hundreds of years.

Secondly, it was intended to be completed with a spire. This seems unlikely, as there has not been a single recorded lantern tower in England that has been topped with a spire. It is possible that a spire was originally intended to rest on the first phase of the tower. It would have looked rather like St James' Church, Louth.

The third explanation is that it is named after the dramatic appearance it creates rising from the flat fenlands that surround it for miles. Other churches, including Ely Cathedral, also derive nicknames from their appearance when viewed from the Fens.

== Library ==
As a centre of learning, St Botolph's has a library that is located above the porch. The height of this above ground level is perhaps to protect the precious books contained within from flooding, an event that was frequent when the church was originally built.

The library was re-founded in 1634, as a result of the metropolitical visitation the previous year. The books from that period were mostly donated, with donors' names recorded on the fly leaf. A later 17th-century vicar left his books to the library, about doubling its size. The bookshelves date from 1766. Indications from the book bindings show the library was not chained, although some books have been held in chained libraries. Catalogues were produced before the Archdeacon got rid of numerous books in 1819.

By 1950 this collection had more than 1,500 volumes. The majority of books (about 1,200) date to the 17th century, but about 150 books were printed before 1600, and there are a small number of incunabula dating from 1501 or earlier. Many of these books are believed to be a gift of Anthony Tuckney (1599–1670), who was vicar when the library was first established.

The most notable titles are a 12th-century manuscript, St Augustine's Commentary on Genesis, and a 1542 edition of the works of Geoffrey Chaucer. Religious books from the time of the early printing press include the Book of Common Prayer from 1549, and also a collection of books by Dutch philosopher and theologian Erasmus, published from 1545 to 1548.

Many sermons were recorded and are held by the library. Some considered to be of political and religious importance were given by preacher Robert Sanderson, a royalist during the English Civil War. At one point, he served as the personal chaplain to King Charles I. Such preachers who combined religion with politics, provided a unique viewpoint into the Royalist mindset.

Although the parish records from before 1900 were moved to Lincoln in 1988 for safe keeping, the parish library remains one of the ten biggest in England today. A dedicated cataloguer has been hired, and the library is being recorded and restored.

== Political climate and its effects ==
The Reformation in England resulted in a reduction of the cathedral-like complex. At its peak the church was larger than it is today, including a number of attached buildings: the Corpus Christi Chapel to the south-western edge of the porch, and Charnel House on the eastern side of the nave opposite the Cotton Chapel. Together these extensions created a traditional cruciform shape to the building.

But in 1612 the church was damaged by militant local puritans. This is the year when the present pulpit was erected. Its grand style and prominence indicate the importance accorded to preaching in the time of the Pilgrims. More damage was done by Parliamentary forces during the English Civil War. They are said to have used the church as their camp in 1643. The Parliamentary forces destroyed stained-glass windows that they found politically or religiously offensive, as happened in many other churches in Lincolnshire.

John Cotton was a 17th-century vicar of Boston. A Puritan, he was noted as a preacher and attracted new members to the congregation. He wanted to change the Anglican Church from within, and simplify its liturgy & practice. He moved to Massachusetts in 1633 as a leader of settlers who had already emigrated (some had spent time in the Netherlands for religious freedom), as well as his own followers. He was instrumental in founding and naming Boston, Massachusetts. The "Cotton Chapel" at St Botolph's was named for him. At one time it was used as a school, and later as the fire station. It was restored in 1857.

== Restoration ==
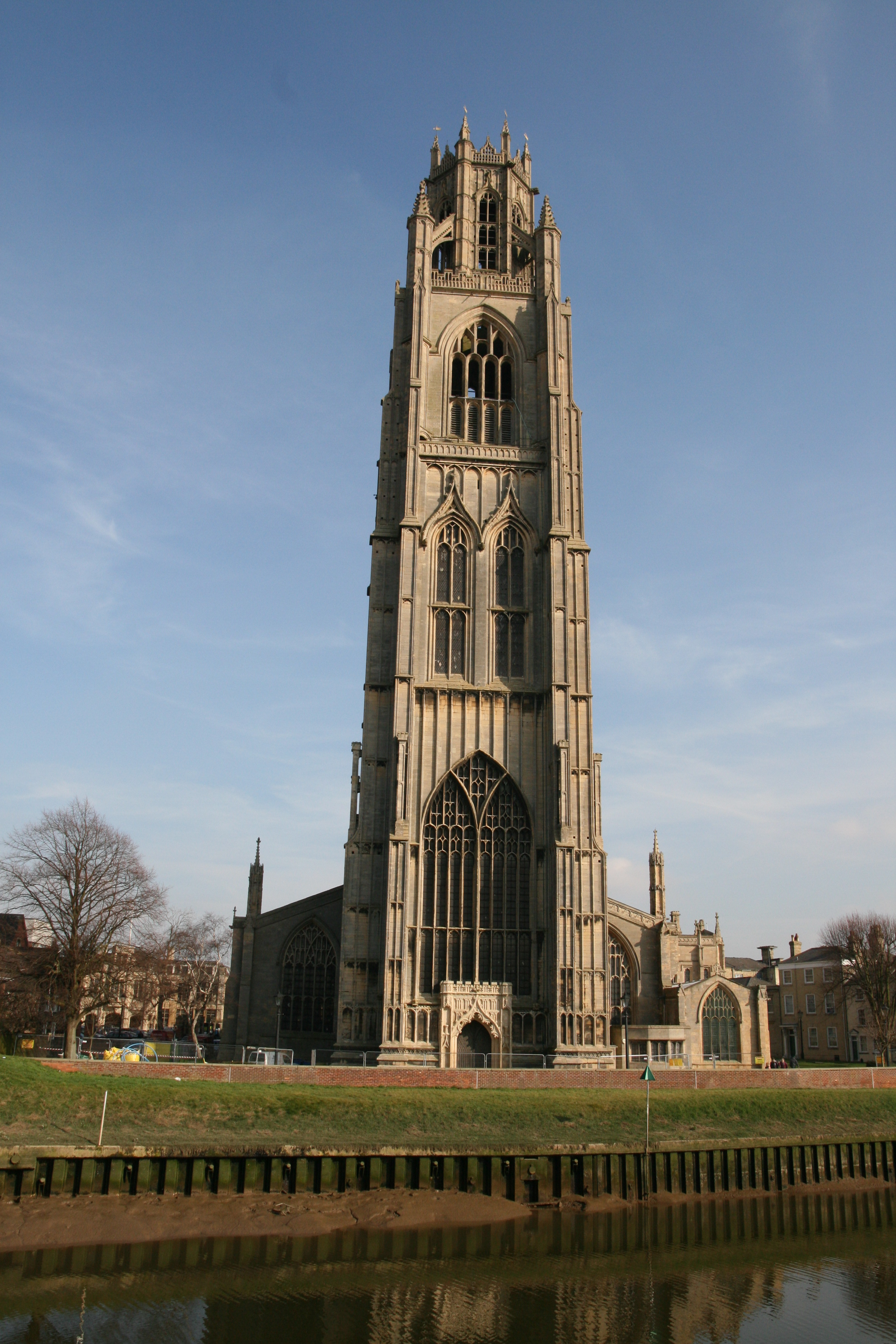
The stump in March 2012

Early restoration work to repair war damage was carried out during the 17th and the 18th centuries. The organ, lost in the Reformation, was replaced in 1715.

From 1851 to 1853, a major period of Victorian restoration occurred. Nottingham architect George Place worked on the church as lead architect, under the direction of Gilbert Scott. The changes they oversaw included the removal of the tower ceiling and the addition of stone vaulting, as originally featured in the medieval plans. Place was responsible for the design of the east window, based on that of All Saints' Church, Hawton in Nottinghamshire, and the original design for the choir stall canopies. The high quality of craftmanship at the end of the 19th and the early 20th centuries is demonstrated here, particularly in the carved wood and stained glass. The works comprised the substitution of elegant oak benches in the place of the old pews, the removal of the organ from its gallery to an external chamber at the north-west angle of the chancel, the restoration of the fine oak stall of the chancel and the addition of seven new carved canopies. The chancel was paved with Minton encaustic tiles. A the west end of the nave, opposite the south door, a new font designed by Augustus Welby Pugin was installed, the gift of A.J.B. Hope, Esq. A new altar of oak weighing about one ton was installed on a dais approached by eleven steps from the chancel. The contractors were Messrs. Cooper of Derby.

Starting in 1929 a major restoration project took place under the supervision of Sir Charles Nicholson. The work included replacement of the nave roof and the installation of a new flat wooden ceiling, and strengthening of the tower. That entailed wooden scaffolding being erected up its entire height. Significant financial support for the restoration work came from the citizens of Boston, Massachusetts. The peal of bells in the tower was restored with a new bell frame, increasing the number of bells from eight to ten. The gas lighting was replaced with electric lighting for the first time. The main restoration project was completed in December 1932. The lady chapel was restored and provided with new fittings in 1933 and the formal restoration scheme came to an end later in 1933. The work had been supported with substantial financial aid from the United States of America.

The ring of ten bells was increased again in 1951 to 15. The bells are now fitted on three racks of five, and were funded by a legacy.

Some restoration work began in 1979 in preparation for the 700th anniversary of the church. This programme, led by architect Nicholas Rank, was expected to cost something in the region of £3 million. In 2005, The Boston Stump Restoration Trust and Development Appeal was launched to carry out restoration and development of Saint Botolph's Church. The process of restoring this ancient landmark is underway and to date (2013) has included cleaning and conservation of the tower and West Door, cleaning and restoration of the chancel and Cotton Chapel, and the building of new visitor facilities. The latter were officially opened by Anne, Princess Royal in July 2012.

== Burials ==
- John Taverner

== Events ==
In addition to regular worship services, the church holds regular fundraising events, and events for various schools. Every year, Boston Grammar School celebrates the giving of the Royal Charter to the School by holding a Charter Day service in the church.

The Restoration Trust also holds several fundraising concerts. Artists who have performed at the church include Lesley Garrett, The Black Dyke Band, and The Pontarddulais Male Voice Choir. On 26 June 2013, the Boston Stump Restoration Trust held their annual dinner in the nave in St Botolph's Church. In September 2013, the Restoration Trust held a Grand Celebrity Concert with the St Botolph's Singers, featuring Caroline Trutz and Special Guest, Aled Jones.

== Environment ==
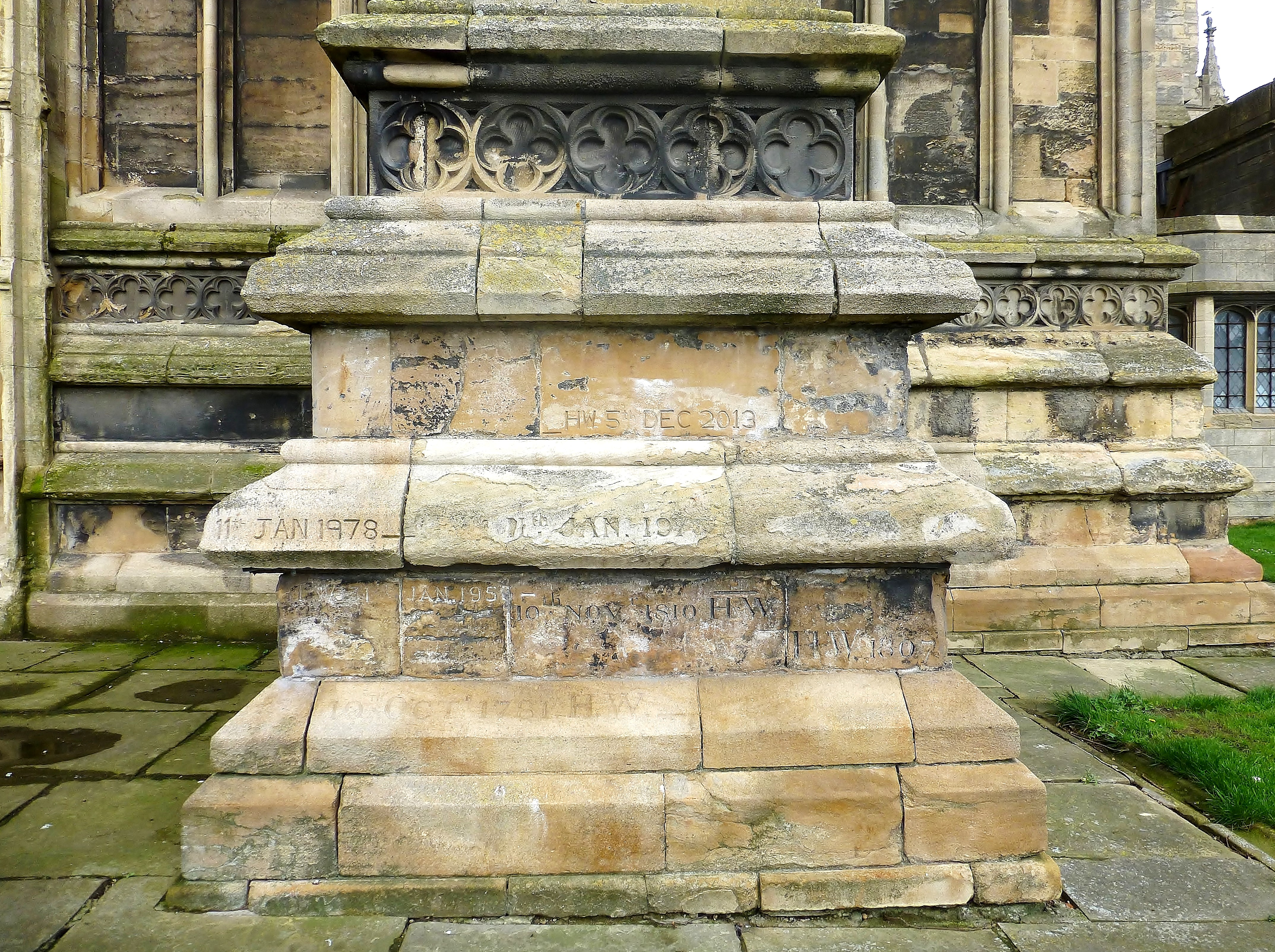
Buttress attached to the west side showing high water flood marks dating back to the 18th century.

Due to its location in flat, low-lying fenland near the sea, the town of Boston has always been at risk of flooding. The buttress on the south-west corner of the tower has been used since the 18th century for keeping a record of the heights and dates of flooding of the church by the River Witham. Flood defences were improved following the North Sea flood of 1953. The church was flooded in 1978 and again on 5 December 2013, when the North Sea flood of 2013 resulted in 2 feet (0.61 m) of water inside and 4 feet (1.2 m) outside the building.

A folk tale tells that the strong winds blowing around the Stump are caused by the breath of the Devil. After an exhausting struggle with St Botolph, the Devil was breathing so heavily that the wind has not yet died down.

== Present day ==
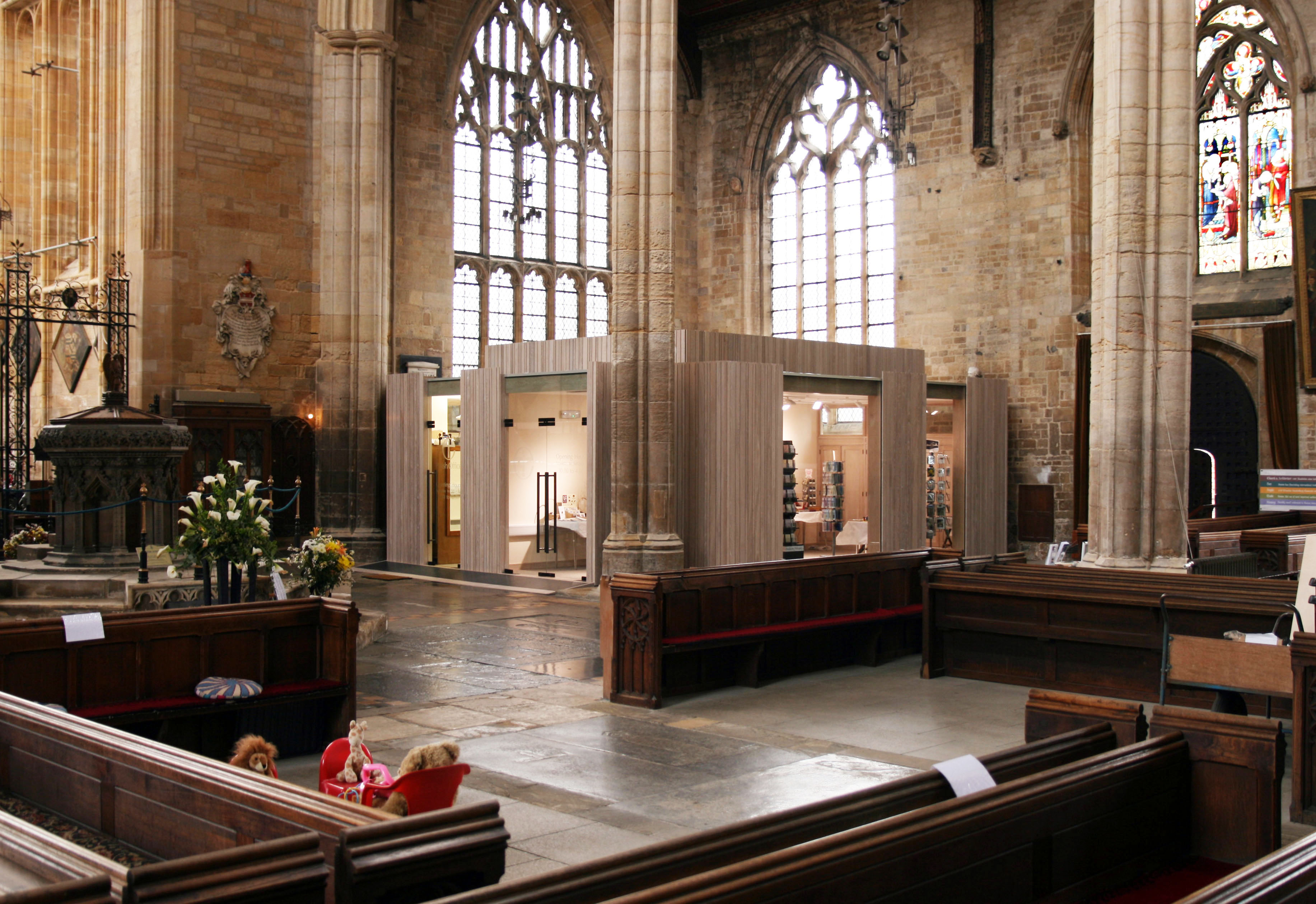
The interior, with bookshop

Simon Jenkins, in his book, England's Thousand Best Churches, ranks St Botolph's among the top 18. Architectural historian Nikolaus Pevsner describes it is "a giant among English parish churches".

As befits the size and architectural importance, St Botolph's is a member of the Anglican Major Churches Network, established for the small number of parish churches that have cathedral-like proportions without the title to match.

A full 3D model of the Stump can be viewed on Google Earth.

== Stained-glass windows ==
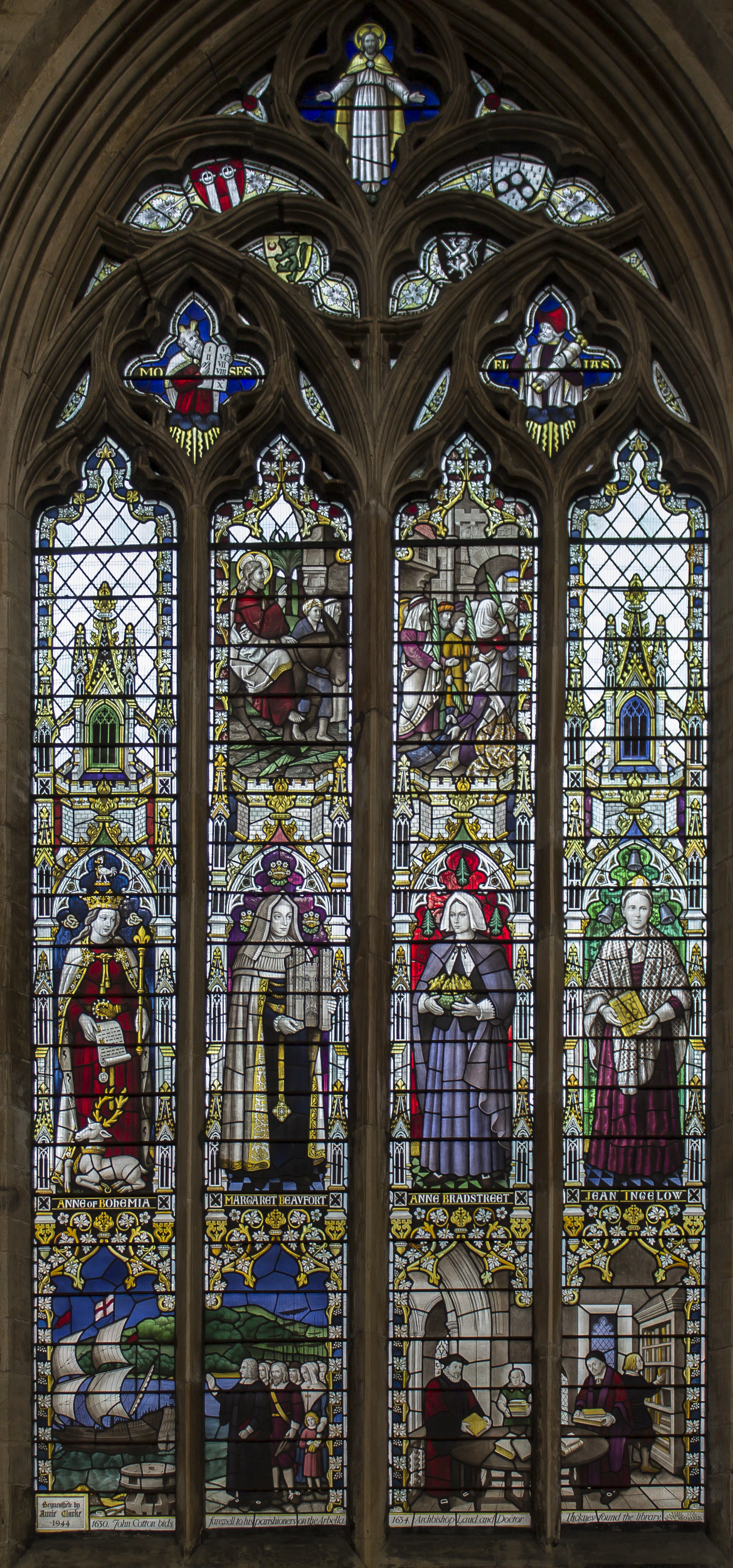
Stained-glass window, St Botolph's Church

One of the large stained-glass windows commemorates important figures in the history of Boston. The figures represent: Anne of Bohemia, Lady Margaret Beaufort, Anne Bradstreet (who went to New England in 1630 and became America's first poet) and Jean Ingelow. The bottom pictures portray John Cotton witnessing the sailing of the Arbella in 1630, and Archbishop William Laud and Anthony Tuckney founding the library in 1634.

== Organ ==
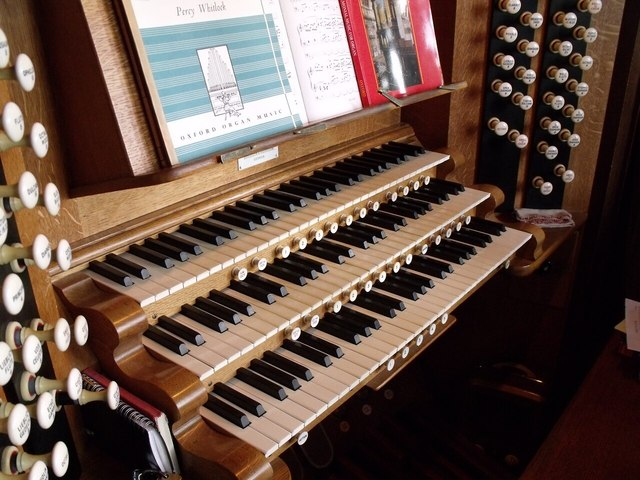
The organ console

The church has a large three-manual pipe organ by Harrison & Harrison. A specification of the organ can be found on the National Pipe Organ Register. In the church's early days each of the various guilds had their own organ but the guilds were suppressed in 1547 and by 1589 all existing organs in the church had been disposed of.

The church was subsequently without an organ for more than a century and a quarter during Puritan days, until Christian Smith was engaged to build one in 1717. Some of Smith's pipes still survive in the present instrument but, over the years, various builders have had a hand in its development, namely Nicholls, Hill, Bishop, Brindley, Norman & Beard and Henry Willis. The last major rebuild was in 1940 by Harrison & Harrison of Durham. In 1987, Harrisons carried out a restoration making some slight tonal changes and taking advantage of modern solid-state technology to increase the facilities. In April 2007, they carried out some routine maintenance and cleaning, and upgraded the combination capture system to include 64 separate channels. The number of general pistons was increased from three to eight. It has three manuals and pedals, with 41 speaking stops and 12 couplers. The action is electro pneumatic.

The chamber organ is a ‘Premier’ model built by the firm of Cousans (Lincoln) Ltd in the 1960s. It is used for more intimate choral performances, where the main organ is not always appropriate, and with an orchestra, as a continuo organ.

=== List of organists ===
- John Taverner 1500 - 1525
- Thomas Wendon ca. 1538
- Unknown 1640 - 1716
- John Webber 1717 - 1741
- James Allen 1741 - 1774
- Robert Lysons 1774 - 1820
- Josiah Ferdinand Reddie 1820 - 1826
- Thomas Kerfoot 1827 - 1832
- Unknown 1832 - 1834
- William Binfield 1834 - 1846
- William Richard Bexfield 1846 - 1848
- Edward Thirtle 1848 - 1867 (afterwards organist of Christ Church, Streatham)
- Walter Bond Gilbert 1867 - 1869
- Daniel Joseph Wood 1869 - 1875 (later Organist of Chichester Cathedral and Exeter Cathedral)
- George Herbert Gregory 1876 - 1919 (formerly organist of Tamworth Parish Church)
- Alan James Derrick 1910 (acting organist)
- Gordon Archbold Slater 1919 - 1927 (later organist of Lincoln Cathedral)
- Joseph Bernard Jackson 1927 - 1951
- Philip Marshall 1951 - 1957 (later organist of Lincoln Cathedral)
- David Arthur Wright 1957 - 1999 (continuing after retirement and in 2007 being appointed Organist Emeritus)
- David Shepherd 2002 - 2013
- Marc Murray 2010 - May 2015
- John Lyon 2015 -
- George Ford 2016 - July 2018

Directors of Music:

- Gary Sieling 1997 - 1999
- Eric Wayman 1999 - 2001
- John Lyon 2001 - 2006
- Eric Wayman 2006 - 2009
- Marc Murray 2010 - May 2015
- George Ford 2016 - July 2018
- John Lyon 2019-

== Bibliography ==
- Jebb, George (1903). A Guide to the Church of S. Botolph: With Notes on the History and Antiquities of Boston and Skirbeck. Dodds.
- Jenkins, Simon (1999). England's Thousand Best Churches. Penguin. p. 299. ISBN 978-0-14-029795-9.
- Parish of Boston. Boston Stump Guide Book
- Spurrell, Mark (1987). Boston Parish Church (3rd ed.).
- Thompson, Pishey (1856). The history and antiquities of Boston, and the villages of Skirbeck, Fishtoft, Freiston, Butterwick, Benington, Leverton, Leake, and Wrangle; comprising the Hundred of Skirbeck, in the County of Lincoln: Illustrated with one hundred engravings. J. Noble, Jun. p. 1.
