= Dogtown (film) =

- DVD cover
- Directed by: George Hickenlooper
- Written by: George Hickenlooper
- Produced by: Donald Zuckerman; Michael Beugg; Bradford L. Schlei
- Starring: Mary Stuart Masterson; Jon Favreau; Rory Cochrane; Harold Russell; Natasha Gregson Wagner
- Cinematography: Kramer Morgenthau
- Edited by: Valerie Remy-Milora
- Music by: Steve Stevens
- Distributed by: Vanguard Films
- Release date: April 3, 1997 (LAIFF)
- Running time: 99 minutes
- Country: United States
- Language: English

Dogtown is a 1997 American drama film by George Hickenlooper about life in the small town of Cuba, Missouri starring Mary Stuart Masterson, Jon Favreau, Rory Cochrane, Natasha Gregson Wagner and Harold Russell in his final film role.

== Plot ==
A failed actor returns to his small hometown, unaware that he has become a local celebrity. Taking advantage of his newfound fame, he attempts to impress an old unrequited crush who has fallen on hard times.

== Cast ==
- Trevor St. John as Phillip Van Horn, failed actor who returns to his hometown, had crush on Dorothy in high school
- Mary Stuart Masterson as Dorothy Sternen, former beauty queen, now an alcoholic and depressed hairdresser in off/on relationship with Ezra
- Jon Favreau as Ezra Good, racist bully from Phillip's past; off/on relationship with Dorothy
- Karen Black as Rose Van Horn, Phillip's mother who sings in a local band
- Harold Russell as Blessed William, a war veteran who runs the cigar store
- Natasha Gregson Wagner as Sara Ruth Van Horn, Phillip's sister and Rose's daughter who is mentally handicapped
- Rory Cochrane as Curtis Lasky, bully from Phillip's past; close friends with Ezra

== Production ==
The film was shot entirely in Torrance, California. Hickenlooper intentionally tried to make Ezra Good, Jon Favreau's character, compelling and worthy of the audience's interest despite his racism. Shooting took 24 days. Russell's part was written for him, though he had to be persuaded to take the role.

== Release ==
Dogtown premiered at the Los Angeles Independent Film Festival in April 1997.

== Reception ==
Todd McCarthy of Variety described the film as an "occasionally amusing" melodrama, but also noted that "while a largely excellent cast keeps viewer interest from flagging, this [...] low-key melodrama has too soft a center," that "Masterson injects the one note of genuine feeling into a film whose portrait of small-town denizens perilously comes to resemble a freak show," and that Hickenlooper "pushes everything too far into caricature and, near the end, needless melodrama."

=== Awards ===
- 1998 Hermosa Beach Film Festival: Best Director (George Hickenlooper); Best Screenplay (George Hickenlooper); Best Actress (Karen Black)
- 1998 Newport Beach Film Festival: Best Director (George Hickenlooper)
