= Methodist Board of Temperance, Prohibition, and Public Morals =

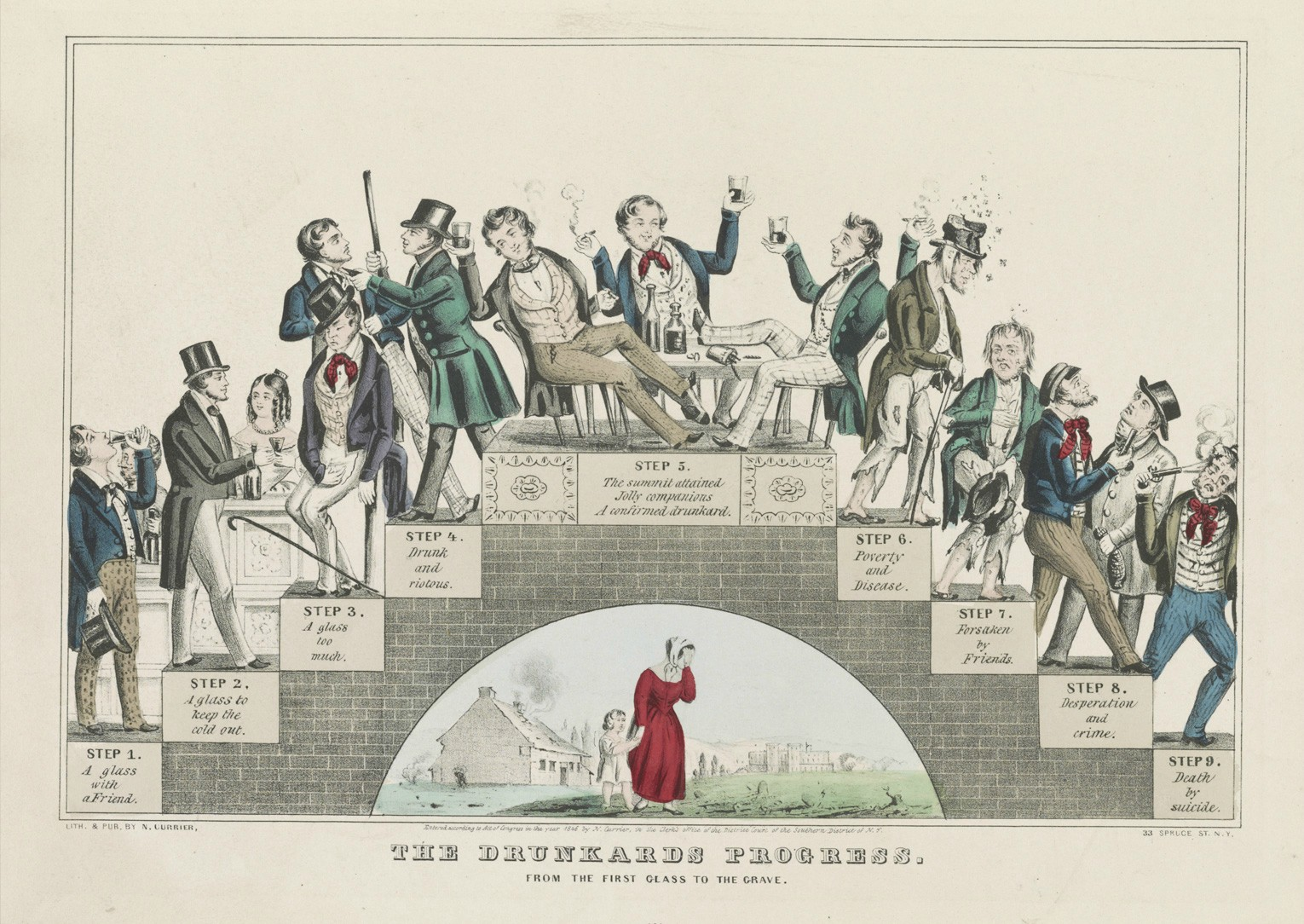
The Drunkard's Progress: A lithograph by Nathaniel Currier supporting the temperance movement, January 1846.

The Methodist Episcopal Church Board of Temperance, Prohibition, and Public Morals was a major organization in the American temperance movement which led to the introduction of prohibition in 1920. It was headed for many years by Clarence True Wilson.

The Methodist Episcopal Church South had a similar agency called the Board of Temperance and Social Service, with which Bishop James Cannon, Jr. was long associated.

The success of Temperance movement would never have happened without the leadership of another Methodist, Frances Willard, leader of the Women's Christian Temperance Union (WCTU), a mighty force, with chapters located throughout the United States and beyond.

The Board of Temperance, Prohibition and Public Morals constructed the Methodist Building on Capitol Hill in Washington, DC in the 1920s to further increase its influence and lobbying power in public policy matters regarding alcoholic beverages. It was dedicated on January 16, 1924 Robert Dean McNeal, Valiant for Truth: Clarence True Wilson and Prohibition, 1992 ISBN 0-9632048-0-7 p. 47 with the famed orator and former presidential candidate William Jennings Bryan serving as a primary speaker. Located at 100 Maryland Ave NE, it faces the east side of the United States Capitol Building with the Supreme Court Building across the street to its south.

After ratification of the Eighteenth Amendment to the United States Constitution established Prohibition, the Methodist Board promoted its aggressive enforcement. It also attempted to eliminate any criticism or opposition to what many called the Noble Experiment. In 1925, it charged that vaudeville acts and comic strips were being used to dispense wet (anti-prohibition) propaganda in New York City, which it called "a foreign city, run by foreigners for foreigners according to foreign ideas." Clarence True Wilson led the way and traveled widely promoting temperance and prohibition. He and his wife often traveled with Clarence Darrow, the famed agonistic, and Darrow's wife. They found that hearing both of them debate the wisdom and merits of Prohibition drew much attention and lively crowds. After about a dozen years, and many unintended consequences, Prohibition was repealed.

In 1964 The Methodist Board of Temperance was merged with the Methodist Board of Social and Economic Relations and the Methodist Board of World Peace to create the Board of Christian Social Concerns. After the 1968 merger of The Methodist Church with the Evangelical United Brethren Church the name became The General Board of Church and Society (GBCS). A debate ensued over who would have use of the funds from leasing space in the building. Some said the 1965 trust contract required all principal and income from the trust's assets to be used exclusively for "work in the areas of temperance and alcohol problems." However, copies of the original pledge cards found at the United Methodist Archives, Drew University, indicated that the building was being built as Protestant presence on Capitol Hill.

Some United Methodists have pointed out that the General Board of Church and Society supports programs on antiwar, care for creation, human rights, racism, healthcare, economic justice, and dozens of other activities unrelated to reducing the consumption of alcohol. GBCS officials responded that they interpret the trust's language to include a variety of social causes.

The General Board of Church and Society petitioned the D.C. Superior Court to ratify its interpretation of the 1965 trust document. At trial the District of Columbia Superior Court ruled in favor of GBCS. The United Methodist Building now houses the Washington offices of a number of faith related organizations as they work in is issue based coalitions to address critical social concerns and present a common voice to congressional offices and the US administration.

== See also ==
- Bishop James Cannon, Jr.

== Sources ==
- Kyvig, David. Repealing National Prohibition. Chicago, IL: University of Chicago Press, 1979.
- Sali, Sean. Methodist building transfer delayed. Washington Times, May 6, 2004.
- Sann, Paul. Lawless Decade. NY: Bonanza, 1957.
- McNeil, Robert Dean. "Valiant for Truth". Portland, OR: Oregonians Concerned about Addition Problems, 1992. ISBN 0-9632048-0-7
