= Diary of a Sergeant =

1945 film by Joseph M. Newman

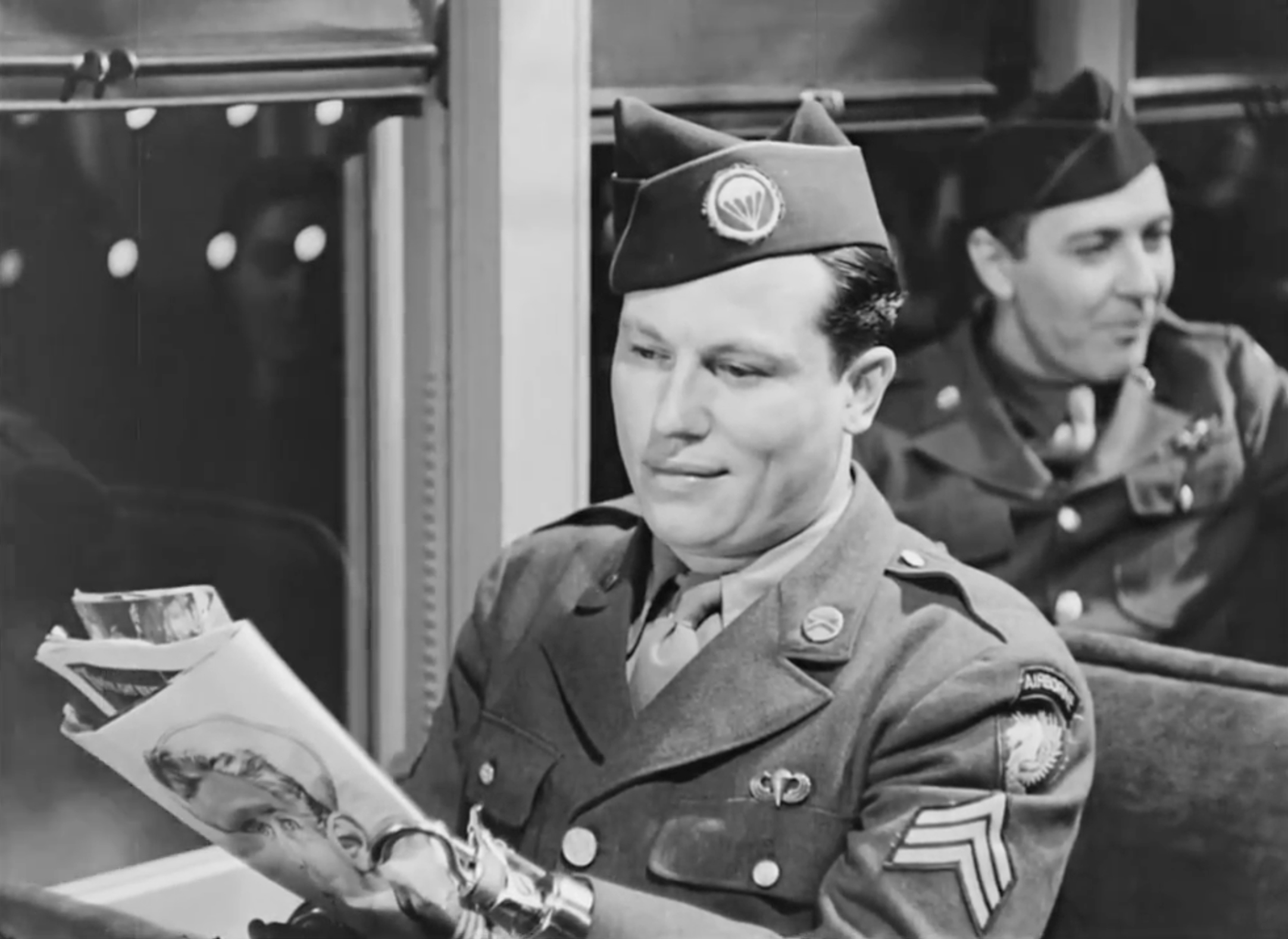
- Sgt. Harold Russell in Diary of a Sergeant
- Directed by: Joseph M. Newman
- Starring: Harold Russell
- Production company: Army Pictorial Service Signal Corps
- Release date: 1945
- Running time: 22 mins
- Country: United States
- Language: English

Diary of a Sergeant is a 1945 American short film produced by the United States Army Pictorial Service. It stars Harold Russell, who lost his hands in a military training accident in 1944. The film tells the story of his medical rehabilitation at Walter Reed Army Medical Center in Washington, D.C.

Diary of a Sergeant (1945).

After seeing the film, director William Wyler cast Russell in The Best Years of Our Lives (1946). Russell received two Academy Awards for his work in the film, becoming the only actor to receive two Oscars for the same role.
