= Harold Russell =

American veteran and actor (1914–2002)

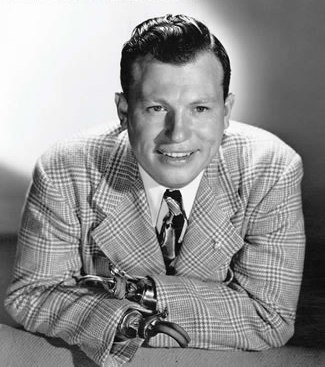
- Russell in 1946
- Born: Harold John Avery Russell; January 14, 1914; North Sydney, Nova Scotia, Canada
- Died: January 29, 2002 (aged 88); Needham, Massachusetts, U.S.
- Resting place: Lakeview Cemetery; Wayland, Massachusetts
- Spouses: Rita Russell-Nixon (m. 1944; died 1978) Betty Marshalsea (m. 1981)
- Children: 2
- Military service
- Allegiance: United States of America
- Branch: United States Army
- Service years: 1941–1945
- Rank: Sergeant
- Unit: 13th Airborne Division
- Conflicts: World War II

Harold John Avery Russell (January 14, 1914 – January 29, 2002) was an American World War II veteran and actor. After losing his hands during his military service, Russell was cast in the epic drama film The Best Years of Our Lives (1946), which earned him the Academy Award for Best Supporting Actor. He was the first non-professional actor to win an Academy Award for acting and the first Oscar recipient to sell his award.

== Early life ==
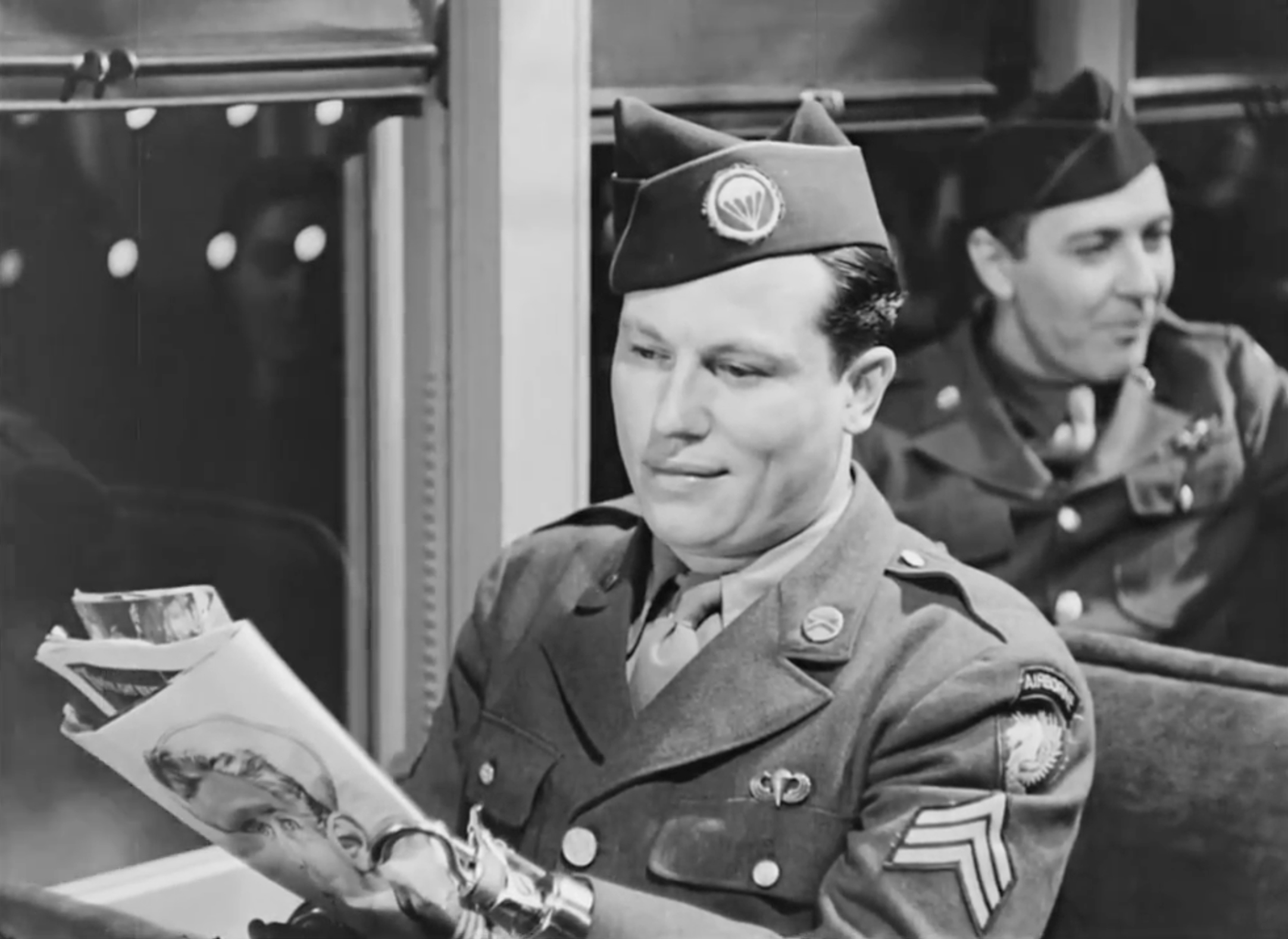
Sgt. Harold Russell in Diary of a Sergeant (1945)

Harold Russell was born in North Sydney, Nova Scotia, Canada, and moved to Massachusetts, United States, with his family in 1921, after his father's death in 1920.

At the time of the December 7, 1941 attack on Pearl Harbor, Russell was living in Cambridge, Massachusetts, working at a food market. In his 1949 autobiography Victory in My Hands he wrote that he rushed to enlist in the United States Army because he considered himself a failure.

On June 6, 1944, while he was an Army instructor teaching demolition work with the U.S. 13th Airborne Division at Camp Mackall, North Carolina, a defective fuse detonated TNT explosives that he was handling. He lost both hands and was given two hooks to serve as hands. After his recovery, while attending Boston University, Russell was featured in Diary of a Sergeant, an Army film about rehabilitating war veterans.

== The Best Years of Our Lives ==
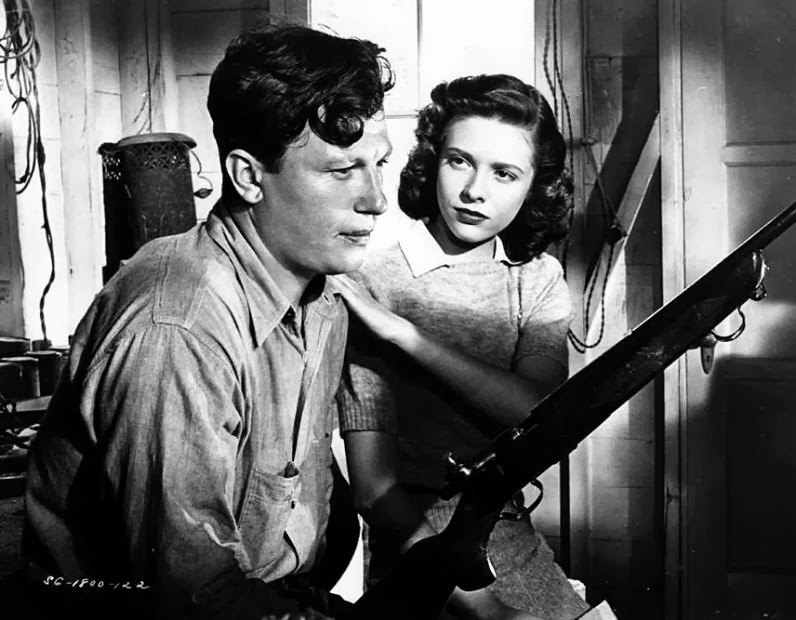
Russell and Cathy O'Donnell in The Best Years of Our Lives (1946)

When film director William Wyler saw the film on Russell, he cast him in The Best Years of Our Lives with Fredric March and Dana Andrews. Russell played the role of Homer Parrish, a United States Navy sailor who lost both hands during the war.

For his role as Parrish, Russell won the Academy Award for Best Supporting Actor in 1947. Earlier in the ceremony, he was awarded an honorary Oscar for ''bringing aid and comfort to disabled veterans through the medium of motion pictures.'' The special award had been created because the board of governors wanted to salute Russell, a non-professional actor, but assumed that he had little chance for a competitive win. It was the only time in Oscar history that the academy awarded two Oscars for the same performance.

Wyler called it "the finest performance I have ever seen on the screen.'' However, Russell earned less than $10,000 for his performance (equivalent to $167,500 in 2023 dollars) and did not receive any residual profits.

== Later years ==
Diary of a Sergeant (1945)

Upon completion of the film, Russell returned to school at Wyler's urging and earned a business degree from Boston University. Speaking with the Los Angeles Times in 1996, Russell recalled:

Wyler told me I should go back to college because there wasn't much call for a guy with no hands in the motion picture industry. I figured he was right. [In the few roles I've taken since then,] I always play a disabled veteran. And this is what Wyler said—'After a while they're going to run out of ideas'—and he was absolutely right. How many times can you play the same role?

Russell became active in AMVETS (American Veterans), serving three terms as National Commander. He was first elected in 1949 and was elected to his third term in 1960. He was also vice-president of the World Veterans Fund, Inc., the fundraising branch of the World Veterans Federation.

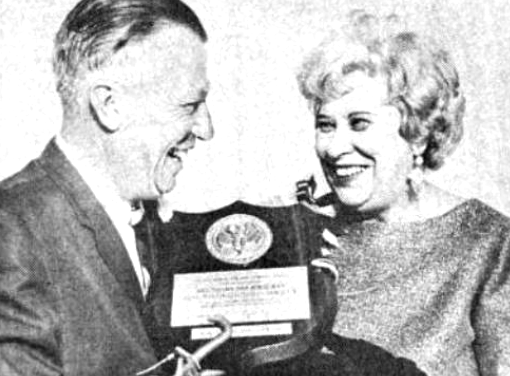
Russell presents an award to Thelma Van Norte in 1966, in his role as a chair of the President's Committee on Employment of the Handicapped.

As head of AMVETS, Russell wrote to President Truman in 1951 supporting his decision to dismiss General Douglas MacArthur during the Korean War. Russell's telegram to Truman cited MacArthur's "repeated insubordination in violation of basic American principles governing civil versus military authority." His telegram asserted that those were "obvious grounds" to relieve MacArthur. Erle Cocke, Jr., commander of the American Legion, said that he was "shocked by the news" that AMVETS and the American Veterans Committee supported MacArthur's firing.

From the early 1960s to the late 1980s, Russell served as chairman of the President's Commission on Employment of the Handicapped, an unpaid position.

In 1965, Russell received the Golden Plate Award of the American Academy of Achievement.

Russell appeared in two films after his debut, Inside Moves in 1980 and Dogtown in 1997. He also appeared in an episode of Trapper John, M.D., in 1981 and a two-part episode of the television series China Beach in 1989.

Russell authored two autobiographies, Victory in My Hands (1949) and The Best Years of My Life (1981).

In 1992, Russell consigned his Oscar for Best Supporting Actor to Herman Darvick Autograph Auctions, and, on August 6, 1992, in New York City, the Oscar was sold to a private collector for $60,500. Russell defended his action by saying that he needed money for his wife's medical expenses, though this was later disputed. Russell did not sell the special Oscar. After his death, the unknown collector was identified as studio executive and talent agent Lew Wasserman, who donated it back to the Academy. (Wasserman died five months after Russell.)

On January 29, 2002, Russell died 15 days after his 88th birthday at a nursing home in Needham, Massachusetts. His body was interred in Lakeview Cemetery in the nearby town of Wayland.

== Filmography ==
Year	Title	Role	Notes
1945	Diary of a Sergeant	himself	Official Film of the United States War Department
1946	The Best Years of Our Lives	Homer Parrish	Academy Award for Best Supporting Actor; Honorary Academy Award; Golden Globes – Special Award for Non-professional acting
1980	Inside Moves	Wings	
1981	Trapper John, M.D.	Leo Hopkins	TV episode – "The Days of Wine and Leo" aka: "Harold Russell Story"
1989	China Beach	Uncle Conal	TV episodes – "The World, Pts. 1 & 2"
1997	Dogtown	Blessed William	(final film role)
