= Bruce Charles Savage =

Bruce Charles Savage (July 30, 1906 – February 4, 1993) was the United States Public Housing Administration (PHA) (defunct) Commissioner under President Dwight D. Eisenhower, serving from 1960 to 1961. In 1965, under President Lyndon B. Johnson, the PHA became the present-day United States Department of Housing and Urban Development (HUD). A Rockefeller Republican, Savage sought to expand the services of national public housing at a time when public housing was limited in most areas and discouraged by many in both political parties. He was largely seen as a hands-on commissioner whose appointment was considered by others as an indication that Eisenhower was becoming serious about expanding public housing.

Savage was born in Indianapolis and attended Indiana, Northwestern, and Butler universities. In 1944, he founded the Bruce Savage Company (later called Savage/Landrigan Inc., Realtors, after his son-in-law joined the firm), a residential real estate brokerage that was the largest such firm in Indiana until the mid-1960s. The firm closed in 1984, following the death of his successor.

Savage was keenly aware of the needs of elderly housing and served on several related national, state, and local governmental and private groups. In addition, he served as the president of the Indianapolis Board of Realtors (1950) and the Greater Indianapolis Progress Commission (GIPC). A Presbyterian, he was a member of various clubs and organizations including the Indianapolis Columbia Club, the Indianapolis Athletic Club, Kiwanis, Meridian Hills Country Club, and Beta Theta Pi fraternity. He was married to Marabeth Thomas Savage (1908–1994) and was the father of Lynne Penelope Savage Landrigan and Sarah Anne Savage.
