= 1946 in film =

The year 1946 in film involved some significant events, most notably the releases of The Best Years of Our Lives and It's a Wonderful Life.

== Top-grossing films (U.S.) ==
The top ten 1946 released films by box office gross in North America are as follows:

Highest-grossing films of 1946
Rank	Title	Distributor	Domestic rentals
1	Duel in the Sun	Selznick International	$10,000,000
2	The Best Years of Our Lives	RKO	$7,675,000
3	The Jolson Story	Columbia	$7,600,000
4	Blue Skies	Paramount	$5,700,000
5	Saratoga Trunk	Warner Bros.	$5,148,000
6	The Razor's Edge	20th Century Fox	$5,000,000
7	Night and Day	Warner Bros.	$4,990,000
8	Notorious	RKO	$4,850,000
9	The Yearling	MGM	$4,768,000
10	Till the Clouds Roll By	MGM	$4,748,000

== Events ==
- February 14 – Charles Vidor's Gilda starring Rita Hayworth and Glenn Ford shows audiences one of the most famous scenes of the 20th century: Rita Hayworth singing "Put The Blame On Mame".
- April 22 – The Allies in Japan begin burning the prints of Japanese films banned for non-democratic or "feudal" content.
- November 21 – William Wyler's The Best Years of Our Lives premieres in New York featuring an ensemble cast including Fredric March, Myrna Loy, Dana Andrews, Teresa Wright, and Harold Russell.
- December 20 – Frank Capra's It's a Wonderful Life, featuring James Stewart, Donna Reed, Lionel Barrymore, Henry Travers, and Thomas Mitchell opens in New York.

== Awards ==
Category/Organization	4th Golden Globe Awards February 26, 1947	19th Academy Awards March 13, 1947
Best Film	The Best Years of Our Lives	
Best Director	Frank Capra; It's a Wonderful Life	William Wyler; The Best Years of Our Lives
Best Actor	Gregory Peck; The Yearling	Fredric March; The Best Years of Our Lives
Best Actress	Rosalind Russell; Sister Kenny	Olivia de Havilland; To Each His Own
Best Supporting Actor	Clifton Webb; The Razor's Edge	Harold Russell; The Best Years of Our Lives
Best Supporting Actress	Anne Baxter; The Razor's Edge	

== Notable films released in 1946 ==
United States unless stated

=== A ===
- Angel on My Shoulder
- Anna and the King of Siam, starring Irene Dunne, Rex Harrison and Linda Darnell
- Aru yo no Tonosama

=== B ===
- Bad Bascomb, starring Wallace Beery, Margaret O'Brien and Marjorie Main
- The Bandit of Sherwood Forest, starring Cornel Wilde
- The Beast with Five Fingers, starring Robert Alda and Peter Lorre
- Beauty and the Beast (La Belle et la Bête), directed by Jean Cocteau, starring Jean Marais and Josette Day
- The Best Years of Our Lives, directed by William Wyler, starring Fredric March, Myrna Loy, Dana Andrews and Harold Russell – winner of 8 Oscars
- Beware, directed by Bud Pollard, starring Louis Jordan
- The Big Sleep, directed by Howard Hawks, starring Humphrey Bogart and Lauren Bacall
- Black Beauty, starring Mona Freeman and Richard Denning
- The Blue Dahlia, starring Alan Ladd and Veronica Lake
- Blue Skies, starring Bing Crosby and Fred Astaire
- Boom in the Moon, starring Buster Keaton
- A Boy and His Dog, starring Harry Davenport

=== C ===
- The Captive Heart, the first Prisoner of War film from World War II
- Canyon Passage, starring Dana Andrews
- Centennial Summer
- The Chase
- Children of Paradise (U.S. release)
- Cloak and Dagger
- Cluny Brown, starring Charles Boyer and Jennifer Jones

=== D ===
- The Dark Corner, starring Lucille Ball and Mark Stevens
- The Dark Mirror, starring Olivia de Havilland
- Deception
- Decoy, a film noir starring Jean Gillie
- Devotion
- The Diary of a Chambermaid
- Dragonwyck, starring Gene Tierney
- Dressed to Kill, a Sherlock Holmes mystery directed by Roy William Neill, starring Basil Rathbone as Holmes, and Nigel Bruce as Watson (released in U.K. as Sherlock Holmes and the Secret Code)
- Duel in the Sun, starring Jennifer Jones, Gregory Peck, Joseph Cotten and Lillian Gish

=== G ===
- Gallant Journey, directed by William A. Wellman
- Gilda, starring Rita Hayworth and Glenn Ford
- Great Expectations, directed by David Lean, starring John Mills, Jean Simmons and Valerie Hobson
- Green for Danger, starring Alastair Sim and Trevor Howard
- The Green Years

=== H ===
- The Harvey Girls, directed by George Sidney, starring Judy Garland and John Hodiak
- Henry V (U.S. release)
- Humoresque, starring Joan Crawford and John Garfield

=== I ===
- I See a Dark Stranger
- It's a Wonderful Life, directed by Frank Capra, starring James Stewart, Donna Reed and Lionel Barrymore
- Ivan the Terrible

=== J ===
- The Jolson Story, a biopic of Al Jolson starring Larry Parks

=== K ===
- The Kid from Brooklyn
- The Killers, directed by Robert Siodmak, starring Burt Lancaster and Ava Gardner

=== L ===
- Let There Be Light, documentary directed by John Huston
- Little Giant, starring Bud Abbott and Lou Costello

=== M ===
- Make Mine Music
- Magnificent Doll, starring Ginger Rogers and David Niven
- A Matter of Life and Death, written and directed by Powell and Pressburger, starring David Niven
- Monsieur Beaucaire, starring Bob Hope
- The Murderers Are Among Us (Die Mörder sind unter uns), starring Hildegard Knef
- My Darling Clementine, directed by John Ford, starring Henry Fonda and Linda Darnell

=== N ===
- Night and Day
- A Night in Casablanca with the Marx Brothers
- No Regrets for Our Youth (Waga seishun ni kuinashi)
- Nobody Lives Forever
- Notorious, directed by Alfred Hitchcock, starring Cary Grant and Ingrid Bergman

=== O ===
- The Outlaw (re-release)
- The Overlanders

=== P ===
- Paisan, directed by Roberto Rossellini (Italy)
- Patrie, directed by Louis Daquin (France)
- People Are Funny, starring Jack Haley
- The Postman Always Rings Twice, starring Lana Turner and John Garfield

=== R ===
- The Razor's Edge, starring Tyrone Power and Gene Tierney
- Renegade Girl, starring Ann Savage
- The Return of Monte Cristo, starring Louis Hayward
- Road to Utopia, starring Bing Crosby, Dorothy Lamour and Bob Hope

=== S ===
- The Seventh Veil (U.S. release)
- She-Wolf of London. starring June Lockhart
- Shoeshine (Sciuscià), directed by Vittorio De Sica
- Shock, directed by Alfred L. Werker, starring Vincent Price and Lynn Bari
- Sister Kenny, starring Rosalind Russell
- Somewhere In The Night, starring John Hodiak
- Song of the South by Walt Disney, combines animation and live action.
- The Spiral Staircase, starring Dorothy McGuire
- A Stolen Life, starring Bette Davis
- The Strange Love of Martha Ivers, starring Barbara Stanwyck
- The Strange Woman, starring Hedy Lamarr and George Sanders
- The Stranger, directed by and starring Orson Welles, Loretta Young and Edward G. Robinson

=== T ===
- Terror by Night, a Sherlock Holmes mystery directed by Roy William Neill, starring Basil Rathbone as Holmes, and Nigel Bruce as Watson
- Theirs Is the Glory
- Three Strangers
- Three Wise Fools, starring Margaret O'Brien and Lionel Barrymore
- The Time of Their Lives, starring Bud Abbott and Lou Costello
- To Each His Own, starring Olivia de Havilland
- Tomorrow Is Forever, starring Orson Welles
- Two Sisters from Boston, starring Kathryn Grayson, June Allyson, Lauritz Melchior, Jimmy Durante and Peter Lawford.

=== U ===
- Utamaro and His Five Women (Utamaro o meguru gonin no onna)

=== V ===
- The Verdict

=== W ===
- Wake Up and Dream
- Wanted for Murder
- The Wife of Monte Cristo, directed by Edgar G. Ulmer
- Without Reservations

=== Y ===
- The Yearling, starring Gregory Peck and Jane Wyman

== Serials ==
- Daughter of Don Q
- Chick Carter, Detective
- The Crimson Ghost
- Hop Harrigan
- King of the Forest Rangers, starring Larry Thompson
- Lost City of the Jungle
- The Mysterious Mr. M
- The Phantom Rider, starring Robert Kent and Peggy Stewart
- The Scarlet Horseman
- Son of the Guardsman

== Short film series ==
- Shirley Temple (1932–1946)
- The Three Stooges (1934–1959)
- Popular Science (1935–1950)

== Animated short film series ==
- Mickey Mouse (1928–1953)
- Looney Tunes (1930–1969)
- Terrytoons (1930–1964)
- Merrie Melodies (1931–1969)
- Popeye (1933–1957)
- Color Rhapsodies (1934–1949)
- Donald Duck (1936–1956)
- Pluto (1937–1951)
- Andy Panda (1939–1949)
- Goofy (1939–1953)
- Bugs Bunny (1940–1964)
- Tom and Jerry (1940–1958)
- The Fox and the Crow (1941–1950)
- Woody Woodpecker (1941–1949)
- Mighty Mouse (1942–1955)
- Droopy (1943–1958)
- Chip and Dale (1943–1956)
- Screwball Squirrel (1944–1946)
- Yosemite Sam (1945–1963)
- George and Junior (1946–1948)

== Births ==
- January 1 – Rick Hurst, American actor (d. 2025)
- January 5 – Diane Keaton, American actress, producer and director (d. 2025)
- January 6 – Cheng Pei-Pei, Chinese actress (d. 2024)
- January 7 – Arnis Līcītis, Latvian actor (d. 2022)
- January 9 – Ursula Mohan, British actress
- January 14 – John F. O'Donohue, American actor (d. 2026)
- January 16 – Kabir Bedi, Indian actor
- January 19 – Dolly Parton, American country singer and actress (d. 2026)
- January 20
  - David Lynch, American director (d. 2025)
  - Samm-Art Williams, American screenwriter, producer and actor (d. 2024)
- January 26
  - Christopher Hampton, British director and screenwriter
  - Gene Siskel, American film critic and journalist (d. 1999)
- February 2
  - Blake Clark, American stand-up comedian, actor and voice actor
  - J. E. Freeman, American actor (d. 2014)
- February 4 – Ivano Marescotti, Italian actor (d. 2023)
- February 5 – Charlotte Rampling, English actress
- February 7 – Pete Postlethwaite, English actor (d. 2011)
- February 8 – Alex Diakun, Canadian actor
- February 13 – Joe Estevez, American actor, director and producer
- February 20 – Brenda Blethyn, English actress
- February 21
  - Tyne Daly, American actress
  - Anthony Daniels, English actor, voice actor and mime artist
  - Alan Rickman, English actor (d. 2016)
- March 1 – Lana Wood, American actress and producer
- March 6 – Martin Kove, American actor and martial artist
- March 7
  - Dan Grimaldi, American actor
  - John Heard, American actor (d. 2017)
- March 9 – Alexandra Bastedo, British actress (d. 2014)
- March 12
  - Dean Cundey, American cinematographer and filmmaker
  - Liza Minnelli, American singer and actress
  - Frank Welker, American actor, voice actor and former stand-up comedian
- March 14 – Steve Kanaly, American actor
- March 21 – Timothy Dalton, British actor
- March 27 – Carl Weintraub, American actor
- March 29 – Paul Herman, American actor (d. 2022)
- April 3 – Nicholas Jones, English character actor
- April 5
  - Jane Asher, English actress
  - Björn Granath, Swedish actor (d. 2017)
- April 8
  - Stuart Pankin, American actor
  - Tim Thomerson, American actor and comedian
- April 12 – Ed O'Neill, American actor and comedian
- April 15
  - Bob DeSimone, American actor
  - Michael Tucci, American actor
- April 18 – Hayley Mills, English actress
- April 19 – Tim Curry, English actor and singer (d. 2026)
- April 20 – Haruhiko Yamanouchi, Japanese actor
- April 22 – John Waters, American filmmaker, writer and actor
- April 23 – Blair Brown, American actress
- April 25
  - Andrzej Seweryn, Polish actor and director
  - Talia Shire, American actress
- April 29 – Wayne Robson, Canadian actor (d. 2011)
- May 1 – Joanna Lumley, British actress
- May 2 – David Suchet, English actor
- May 9 – Candice Bergen, American actress
- May 10 – Maureen Lipman, English actress and comedian
- May 11 – Ago Roo, Estonian actor
- May 13 – Tim Pigott-Smith, English actor (d. 2017)
- May 18 – Andreas Katsulas, American actor (d. 2006)
- May 19 – André the Giant, French professional wrestler and actor (d. 1993)
- May 20 – Cher, American singer and actress
- May 22 – Jack Kehler, American character actor (d. 2022)
- May 23 – Anthony May, English actor (d. 2021)
- June 1 – Brian Cox, Scottish actor
- June 2 – Lasse Hallström, Swedish director
- June 3
  - Tristan Rogers, Australian actor (d. 2025)
  - Penelope Wilton, English actress
- June 5 – John Bach, British-born New Zealand actor
- June 8 – Alan Scarfe, British-Canadian actor (d. 2024)
- June 12 – Jack Thibeau, American actor
- June 15
  - Angela Down, English actress
  - Roy Holder, English actor (d. 2021)
- June 26
  - Ricky Jay, American actor and writer (d. 2018)
  - Leo Rossi, American actor, writer and producer
- June 28
  - Bruce Davison, American actor and director
  - Gilda Radner, American comedian and actress (d. 1989)
- July 2 – Ron Silver, American actor (d. 2009)
- July 6 – Sylvester Stallone, American actor and director
- July 7 – Joe Spano, American actor
- July 9 – Norbert Weisser, German actor
- July 10 – Sue Lyon, American actress (d. 2019)
- July 11 – Beverly Todd, American actress
- July 13 – Cheech Marin, American actor and comedian
- July 14 – Vincent Pastore, American actor (d. 2026)
- July 16
  - Dave Goelz, American puppeteer and actor
  - Richard LeParmentier, American actor (d. 2013)
- July 17 – Alun Armstrong, English actor
- July 18 – Dicken Ashworth, English actor
- July 20 – Randal Kleiser, American director, producer, screenwriter and actor
- July 22 – Danny Glover, American actor and director
- July 27 – Rade Šerbedžija, Croatian actor, director and musician
- August 1 – David Calder, English actor
- August 6 – Peter Simonischek, Austrian actor (d. 2023)
- August 9 – Alain Dorval, French voice actor of Sylvester Stallone, from 1976 to 2024 (d 2024).
- August 14 – Antonio Fargas, American actor
- August 15 – Tony Robinson, English actor
- August 16 – Lesley Ann Warren, American actress and singer
- August 19
  - Ti Lung, Hong Kong actor
  - Christopher Malcolm, Scottish actor, director and producer (d. 2014)
- August 20 – José Wilker, Brazilian actor (d. 2014)
- August 24 – BP Fallon, Irish actor
- August 26 – Alison Steadman, English actress
- August 29 – Lindy Davies, Australian actress and director
- August 30 – Peggy Lipton, American actress, model and singer (d. 2019)
- September 1 – Susan Backlinie, American actress and stuntwoman (d. 2024)
- September 5 – Dennis Dugan, American director, actor, writer and comedian
- September 13 – Frank Marshall, American producer and director
- September 15
  - Tommy Lee Jones, American actor
  - Oliver Stone, director and producer
- September 18 – Struan Rodger, British actor
- September 19 – Michael Elphick, English actor (d. 2002)
- September 22 – John Woo, Hong Kong director, producer and screenwriter
- September 25
  - Mary Beth Hurt, American actress (d. 2026)
  - Drew Snyder, American actor
- September 26 – Togo Igawa, Japanese character actor
- September 28
  - Peter Egan, British actor
  - Jeffrey Jones, American actor
- October 2 – Dale Soules, American actress
- October 3 – William Hall Jr., American actor (d. 2025)
- October 4 – Susan Sarandon, American actress
- October 6 – John Hostetter, American actor and visual artist (d. 2016)
- October 10
  - Charles Dance, English actor
  - Ben Vereen, American actor
- October 14 – Katy Manning, British actress
- October 15 – John Getz, American actor
- October 16 – Suzanne Somers, American actress and singer (d. 2023)
- October 22 – Richard McGonagle, American actor
- October 26 – Philip Sayer, Welsh actor (d. 1989)
- October 27 – Ivan Reitman, Slovak-born Canadian director and producer (d. 2022)
- October 31 – Stephen Rea, Northern Irish actor
- November 3
  - Michael Champion, American singer, musician and actor (d. 2021)
  - Tom Savini, American prosthetic makeup artist, actor, stunt performer and director
- November 4 – John Callen, English-born New Zealand actor and director
- November 6 – Sally Field, American actress
- November 7 – John Aylward, American actor (d. 2022)
- November 10 – Alaina Reed Hall, American actress and singer (d. 2009)
- November 16 – Dan Shor, American actor, director and writer
- November 20
  - Sullivan Walker, Trinidadian actor (d. 2012)
  - Samuel E. Wright, American actor and singer (d. 2021)
- November 21 – Andrew Davis, American director, producer and writer
- November 22 – Paul A. Partain, American actor (d. 2005)
- November 26 – Mark L. Lester, American director, screenwriter and producer
- November 29 – Nathan Jung, American actor and stuntman (d. 2021)
- December 1 – Maggie Steed, English actress and comedian
- December 8
  - Frank Pesce, American actor (d. 2022)
  - John Rubinstein, American actor, composer and director
- December 14
  - Patty Duke, American actress (d. 2016)
  - Lynne Marie Stewart, American actress (d. 2025)
- December 16 – Charles Dennis, Canadian actor, director and screenwriter
- December 17
  - Jayne Eastwood, Canadian actress and comedian
  - Eugene Levy, Canadian actor
- December 18 – Steven Spielberg, American director and producer
- December 19 – Robert Urich, American actor and producer (d. 2002)
- December 20 – John Spencer, American actor (d. 2005)
- December 21 – Josh Mostel, American actor
- December 23 – Susan Lucci, American actress
- December 24 – Daniel Beretta, French voice actor and singer (d. 2024)
- December 25 – Stuart Wilson, English actor
- December 29 – Marianne Faithfull, British actress and singer (d. 2025)
- December 31 – Margaret Travolta, American actress

== Deaths ==
- January 13 – Enid Stamp Taylor, English actress
- February 5 – George Arliss, English actor
- April 1 – Noah Beery Sr., American actor
- June 23 – William S. Hart, American actor
- July 10 – Slim Summerville, American actor and director
- August 8 – Paul Porcasi, Italian actor
- August 10 – Léon Gaumont, French film pioneer
- August 12 – Egon Brecher, Austrian actor, director
- August 13 – H. G. Wells, British science fiction writer
- August 26 – Jeanie MacPherson, American actress and screenwriter
- August 28 – Florence Turner, American actress
- September 21 – Olga Engl, Austrian actress
- October 8 – John St. Polis, American actor
- November 2 – Gabriel Gabrio, French actor
- November 18 – Donald Meek, Scottish-American actor
- December 12 – Renée Jeanne Falconetti, French actress
- December 25 – W. C. Fields, American comedian and actor

== Film debuts ==
- Rodolfo Acosta – Soy un prófugo
- Patricia Barry – Her Kind of Man
- Raymond Burr – Without Reservations
- Eddie Byrne – I See a Dark Stranger
- Hamilton Camp – Bedlam
- Gianna Maria Canale – The Black Eagle
- Paul Carpenter – This Man Is Mine
- Adolfo Celi – A Yank in Rome
- Kirk Douglas – The Strange Love of Martha Ivers
- William Fawcett – Stars Over Texas
- John Hoyt – O.S.S.
- Martha Hyer – The Locket
- Erland Josephson – It Rains on Our Love
- Sam Kydd – The Captive Heart
- Burt Lancaster – The Killers
- Norman Leavitt – The Harvey Girls
- Gina Lollobrigida – The Black Eagle
- Lois Maxwell – A Matter of Life and Death
- Michael Medwin – Piccadilly Incident
- Slim Pickens – Smoky
- Liam Redmond – I See a Dark Stranger
- Enrico Maria Salerno – Unknown Man of San Marino
- Yvonne Sanson – The Black Eagle
- Emil Sitka – One Exciting Week
- José Luis López Vázquez – María Fernanda la Jerezana
- Yves Vincent – Devil and the Angel
- Georges Wilson – Martin Roumagnac
