= The Razor's Edge =

1944 novel by William Somerset Maugham

- First edition
- Author: W. Somerset Maugham
- Language: English
- Publisher: Doubleday, Doran
- Publication date: 1944
- Publication place: United States
- Media type: Print (hardback and paperback)
- Pages: 314 (paperback)
- ISBN: 1-4000-3420-5
- OCLC: 53054407
- Dewey Decimal: 813.54

The Razor's Edge is a 1944 novel by W. Somerset Maugham. It tells the story of Larry Darrell, an American pilot traumatized by his experiences in World War I, who sets off in search of some transcendent meaning in his life. Maugham is the narrator whose narration takes the form of relating his conversations and reactions to the characters. He finds Larry both mystifying and compelling. The story begins through the eyes of Larry's friends and acquaintances as they witness his personality change after the war. His rejection of conventional life and search for meaningful experience allows him to thrive while the more materialistic characters suffer reversals of fortune.

The novel's title comes from a translation of a verse in the Katha Upanishad, paraphrased in the book's epigraph as: "The sharp edge of a razor is difficult to pass over; thus the wise say the path to Salvation is hard."

The book has twice been adapted into film; first in 1946 starring Tyrone Power and Gene Tierney, with Herbert Marshall as Maugham and Anne Baxter as Sophie, and then a 1984 adaptation starring Bill Murray.

== Plot ==
Wounded and traumatised by the death of a comrade in the War, Larry Darrell returns to Chicago and his fiancée Isabel Bradley, only to announce that he does not plan to seek paid employment and instead will "loaf" on his small inheritance. He wants to delay their marriage and refuses to take up a job as a stockbroker offered to him by Henry Maturin, the father of his friend Gray. Meanwhile, Sophie, Larry's childhood friend, settles into a happy marriage, only to later tragically lose her husband and baby in a car accident.

Larry moves to Paris and immerses himself in study and bohemian life. After two years of this "loafing", Isabel visits and Larry asks her to join his life of wandering and searching, living in Paris and traveling with little money. She cannot accept his vision of life and breaks their engagement to go back to Chicago. There she marries the millionaire Gray, who provides her a rich family life. Meanwhile, Larry begins a sojourn through Europe, taking a job at a coal mine in Lens, France, where he befriends a former Polish army officer named Kosti. Kosti's influence encourages Larry to look toward things spiritual for his answers rather than in books. Larry and Kosti leave the coal mine and travel together for a time before parting ways. Larry then meets a Benedictine monk named Father Ensheim in Bonn, Germany, while Father Ensheim is on leave from his monastery doing academic research. After spending months with the Benedictines and being unable to reconcile their conception of God with his own, Larry takes a job on an ocean liner and finds himself in Bombay.

Larry has spiritual adventures in India and comes back to Paris. What he actually found in India and what he finally concluded are held back from the reader for a considerable time until, in a scene late in the book, Maugham discusses India and spirituality with Larry in a café long into the evening. He starts off the chapter by saying "I feel it right to warn the reader that he can very well skip this chapter without losing the thread of the story as I have to tell, since for most part it is nothing more than the account of a conversation that I had with Larry. However, I should add that except for this conversation, I would perhaps not have thought it worthwhile to write this book." Maugham then initiates the reader to Advaita philosophy and reveals how, through deep meditation and contact with Bhagawan Ramana Maharshi, disguised as Sri Ganesha in the novel, Larry goes on to realise God through the experience of samadhi—thus becoming a saint—and in the process gains liberation from the cycle of human suffering, birth, and death that the rest of the earthly mortals are subject to.

The 1929 stock market crash has ruined Gray, and he and Isabel are invited to live in her uncle Elliott Templeton's grand Parisian house. Gray is often incapacitated with agonising migraines due to a general nervous collapse. Larry is able to help him using an Indian form of hypnotic suggestion. Sophie has also drifted to the French capital, where her friends find her reduced to alcohol, opium, and promiscuity—empty and dangerous liaisons that seem to help her to bury her pain. Larry first sets out to save her and then decides to marry her, a plan which displeases Isabel, who is still in love with him.

Isabel tempts Sophie back into alcoholism with a bottle of zubrovka and she disappears from Paris. Maugham deduces this after seeing Sophie in Toulon, where she has returned to smoking opium and promiscuity. He is drawn back into the tale when police interrogate him after Sophie has been found murdered with an inscribed book from him in her room, along with volumes by Baudelaire and Rimbaud.

Meanwhile, in Antibes, Elliott Templeton is on his deathbed. Despite the fact that he has throughout his life compulsively sought out aristocratic society, none of his titled friends come to see him, which makes him alternately morose and irate. But his outlook on death is somewhat positive: "I have always moved in the best society in Europe, and I have no doubt that I shall move in the best society in heaven."

Isabel inherits his fortune, but genuinely grieves for her uncle. Maugham confronts her about Sophie, having figured out Isabel's role in Sophie's downfall. Isabel's only punishment will be that she will never get Larry, who has decided to return to the United States of America and live as a common working man. He is uninterested in the rich and glamorous world that Isabel will move in. Maugham ends his narrative by suggesting that all the characters got what they wanted in the end: "Elliott social eminence; Isabel an assured position...Sophie death; and Larry happiness."

== Influences and critical reception ==
1946 hardcover edition promoting the first film adaptation

Maugham, like Hermann Hesse, anticipated a fresh embrace of Eastern culture by Americans and Europeans almost a decade before the Beats were to popularise it. (Americans had explored Eastern philosophy before these authors, in the nineteenth century through the Transcendentalists, Theosophists, the visit of Vivekananda in 1893, and then Yogananda's move to the US in 1920.) Maugham visited Sri Ramana Ashram, where he had a direct interaction with Ramana Maharshi in Tamil Nadu, India in 1938. Maugham's suggestion that he "invented nothing" was a source of annoyance for Christopher Isherwood, who helped him translate the verse (1.3.14) from the Katha Upanishad for the novel's epigraph – उत्तिष्ठ जाग्रत प्राप्य वरान्निबोधत| क्षुरस्य धारा निशिता दुरत्यया दुर्गं पथस्तत्कवयो वदन्ति|| (uttiṣṭha jāgrata prāpya varān nibodhata| kṣurasya dhārā niśitā duratyayā durga pathas tat kavayo vadanti|| ) – which means "Rise, wake up, seek the wise and realize. The path is difficult to cross like the sharpened edge of the razor (knife), so say the wise."

Many thought Isherwood, who had built his own literary reputation by then and was studying Indian philosophy, was the basis for the book's hero. Isherwood went so far as to write to Time denying this speculation. It has been suggested that Guy Hague was an important influence in the character of Darrell, although it now appears that he was not at Ramanasramam when Maugham visited. The English poet and translator Lewis Thompson is thought to be a more likely candidate. David Haberman has pointed out that Ronald Nixon, an Englishman who took monastic vows and became known as Krishna Prem, served as a fighter pilot in the First World War and experienced a crisis of meaninglessness that was "strikingly similar" to that experienced by Larry.

Another distinct possibility for influence is raised by the anglicised American, British MP Chips Channon in his diaries. During a trip to New York in August 1944, Channon wrote "I saw much of Somerset Maugham, who never before was a friend. He has put me into a book, 'the Razor's Edge' and when I dined with him, I asked him why he had done it, and he explained, with some embarrassment, that he had split me into three characters, and then written a book about all three. So I am Elliott Templeton, Larry, himself the hero of the book, and another: however I am flattered, and the book is a masterpiece ...".
