= 19th Academy Awards =

- Official pamphlet cover
- Date: March 13, 1947
- Site: Shrine Auditorium, Los Angeles, California, USA
- Hosted by: Jack Benny

Highlights
- Best Picture: The Best Years of Our Lives
- Most awards: The Best Years of Our Lives (7)
- Most nominations: The Best Years of Our Lives (8)

The 19th Academy Awards were held on March 13, 1947, honoring the best in film of 1946. The top awards portion of the ceremony was hosted by Jack Benny.

The Best Years of Our Lives won seven of its eight nominations, including Best Picture, Best Director, and both male acting Oscars. The academy awarded Harold Russell—a World War II veteran who had lost both hands in the war—an Honorary Academy Award for "bringing hope and courage to his fellow veterans" for his role as Homer Parrish, believing that, as a non-actor, he would not win the Best Supporting Actor award for which he was nominated. Russell also won the competitive award, making him the only person in Academy history to receive two Oscars for the same performance.

When Olivia de Havilland won the Best Actress Oscar, her sister, Joan Fontaine, attempted to shake her hand, but she refused the handshake, saying "I don't know why she does that when she knows how I feel."

This was the first time since the 2nd Academy Awards that every category had, at most, five nominations.

== Winners and nominees ==
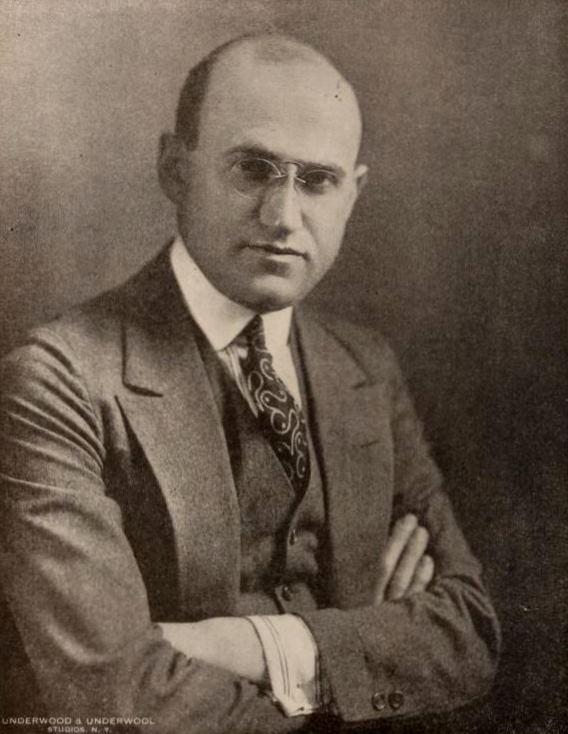
Samuel Goldwyn; Best Picture winner

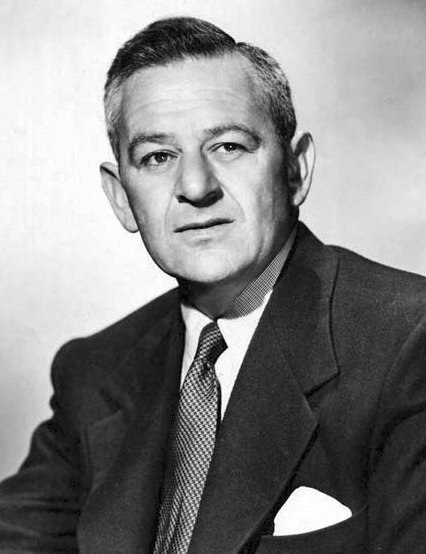
William Wyler; Best Director winner

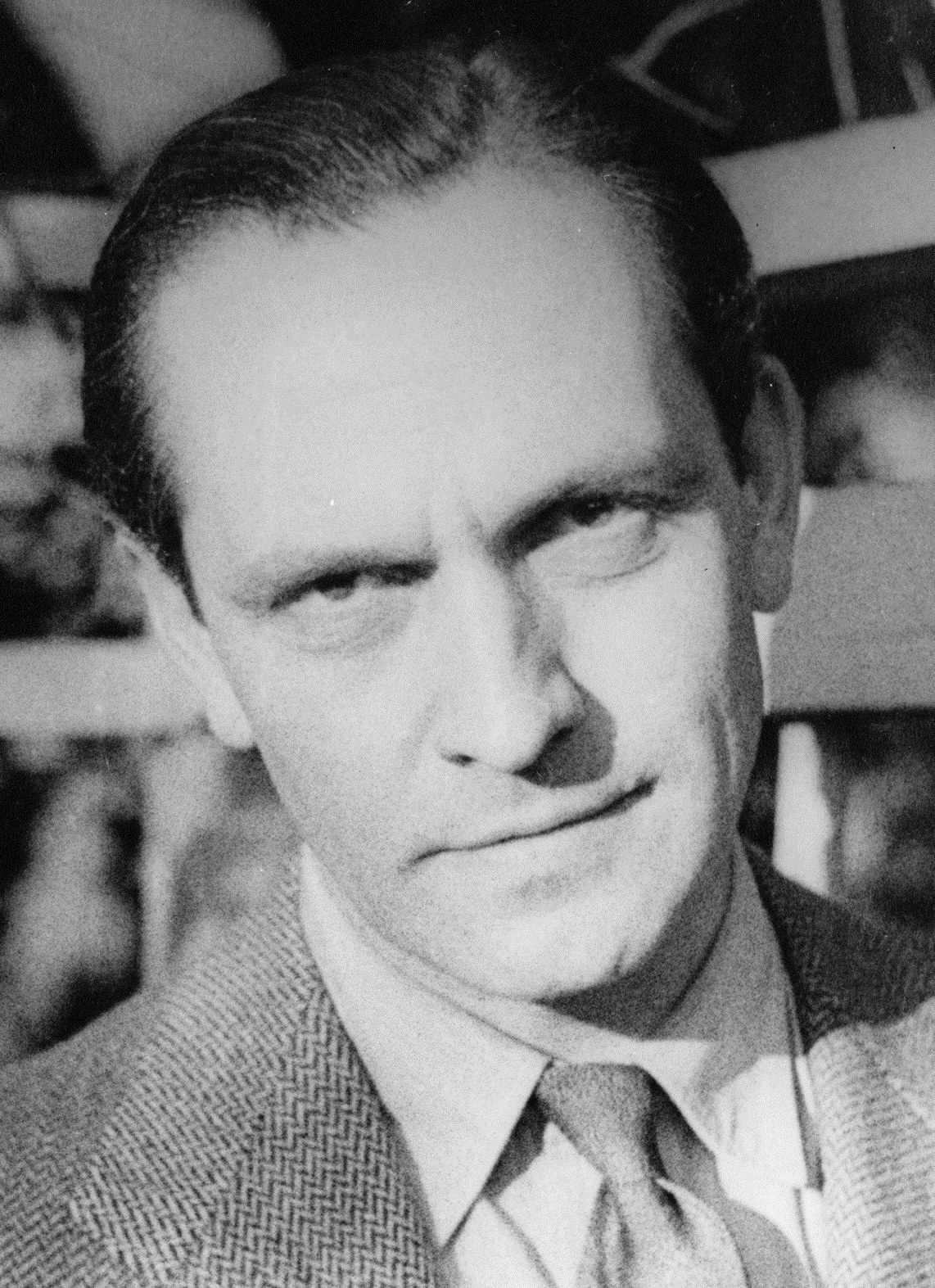
Fredric March; Best Actor winner

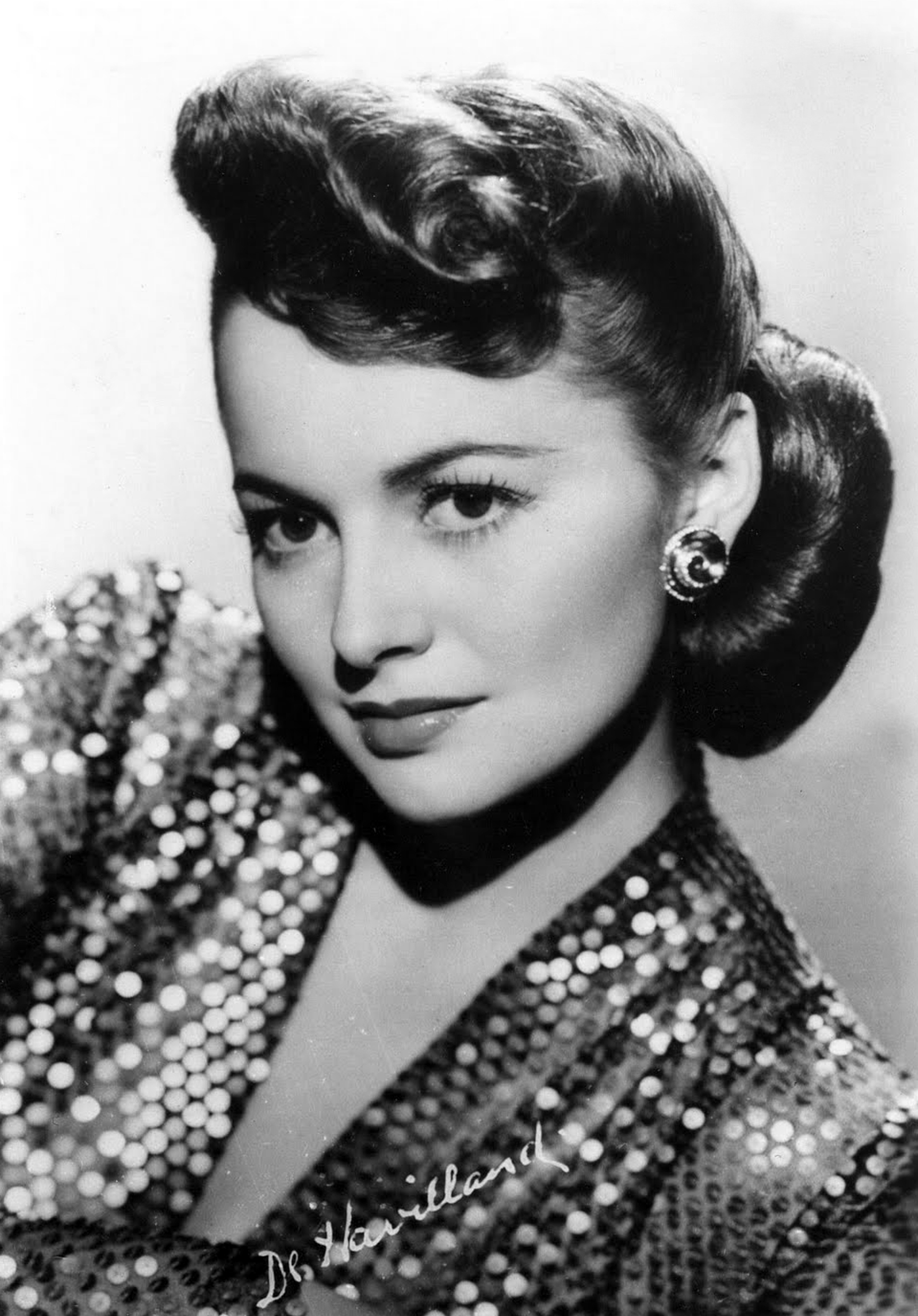
Olivia de Havilland; Best Actress winner

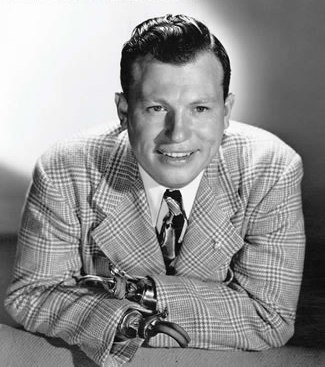
Harold Russell; Best Supporting Actor winner and Honorary Academy Award recipient

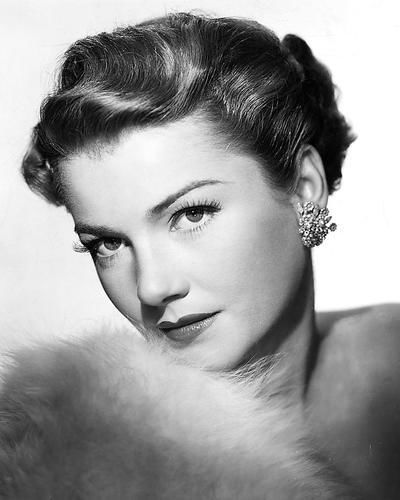
Anne Baxter; Best Supporting Actress winner

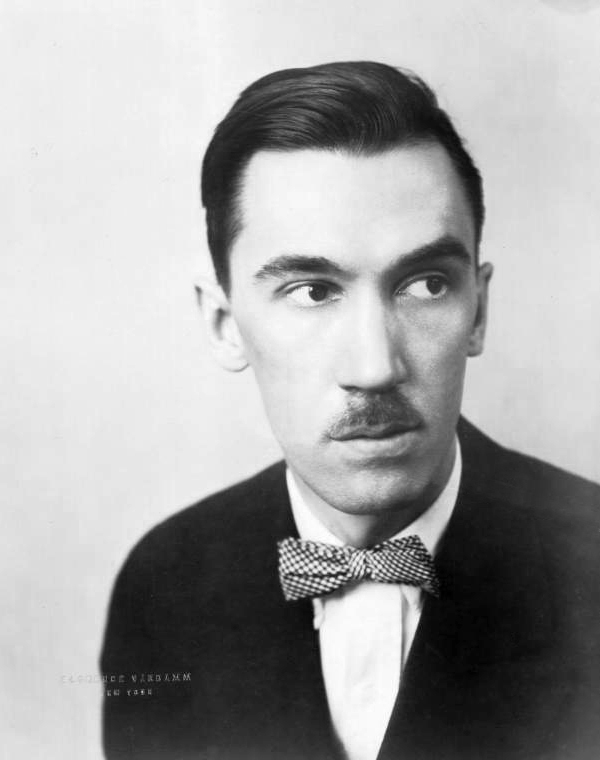
Robert E. Sherwood; Best Screenplay winner

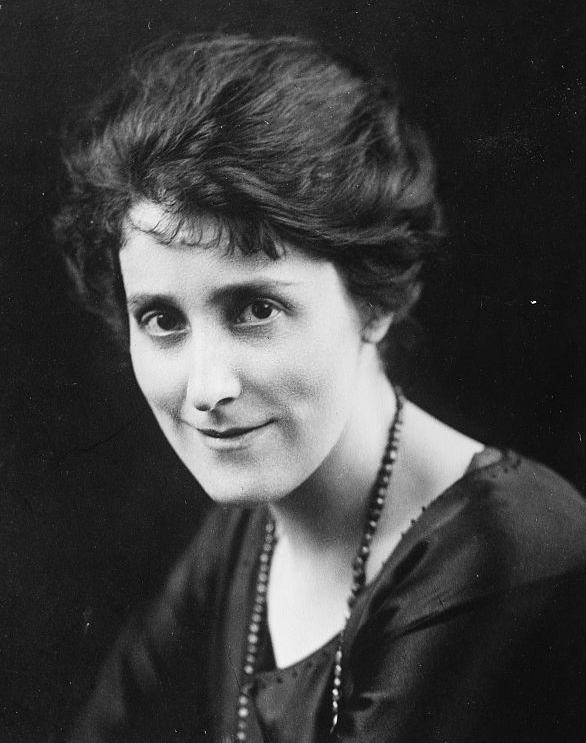
Winifred Ashton (as Clemence Dane); Best Story winner

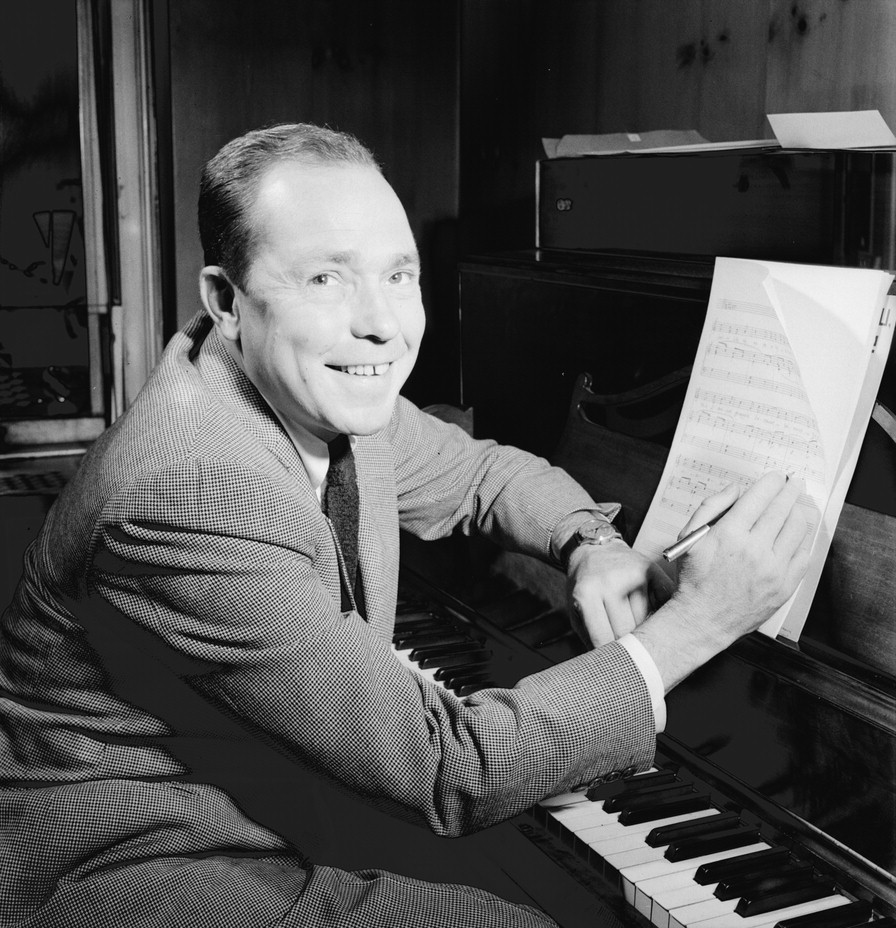
Johnny Mercer; Best Original Song co-winner

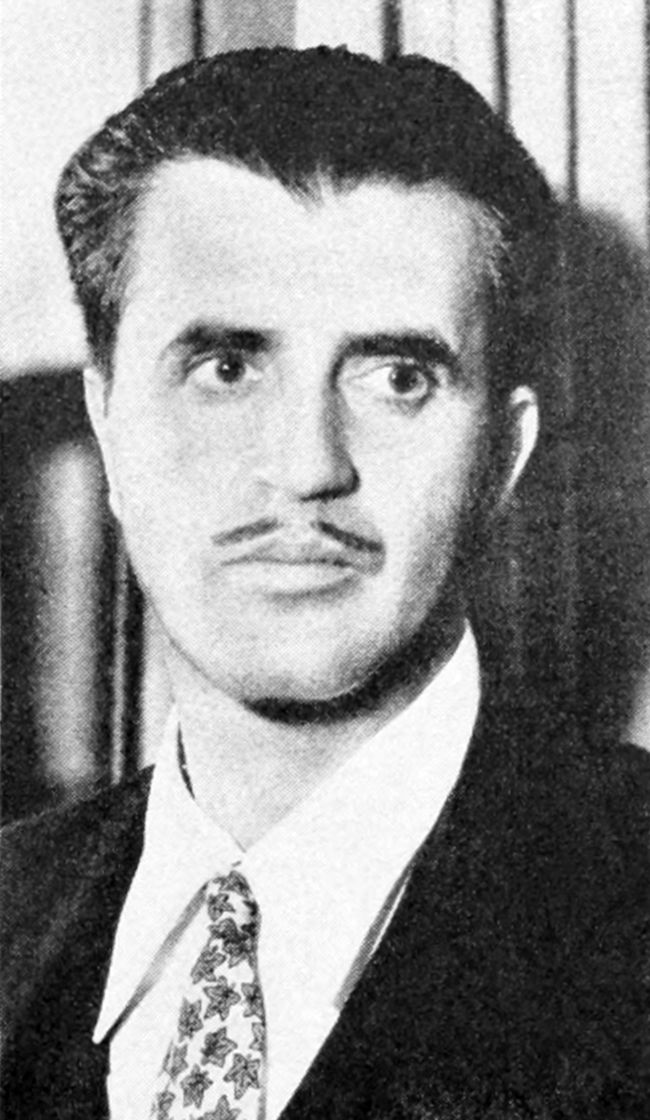
Cedric Gibbons; Best Art Direction, Color co-winner

Charles Rosher; Best Cinematography, Color co-winner

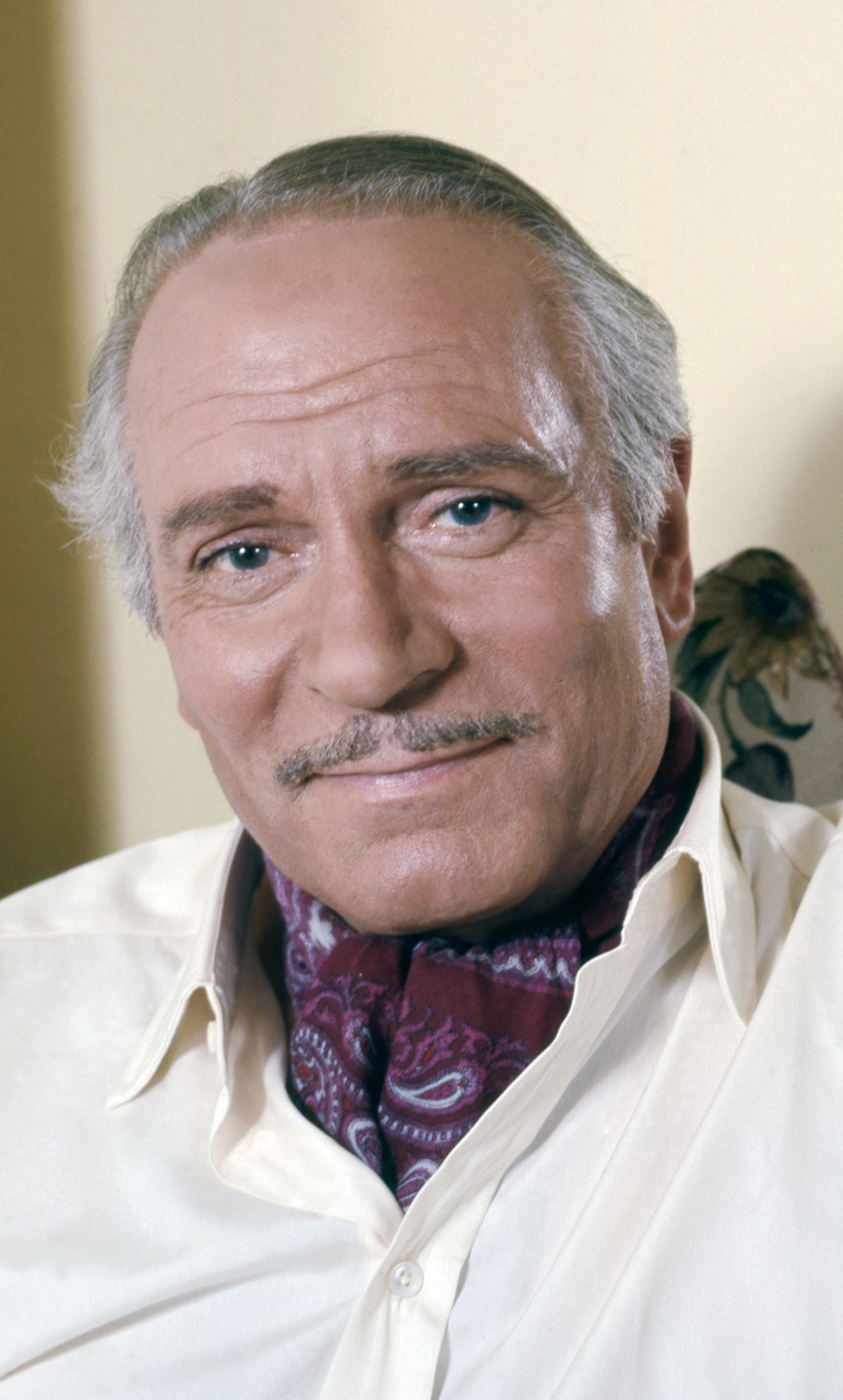
Laurence Olivier; Honorary Academy Award recipient

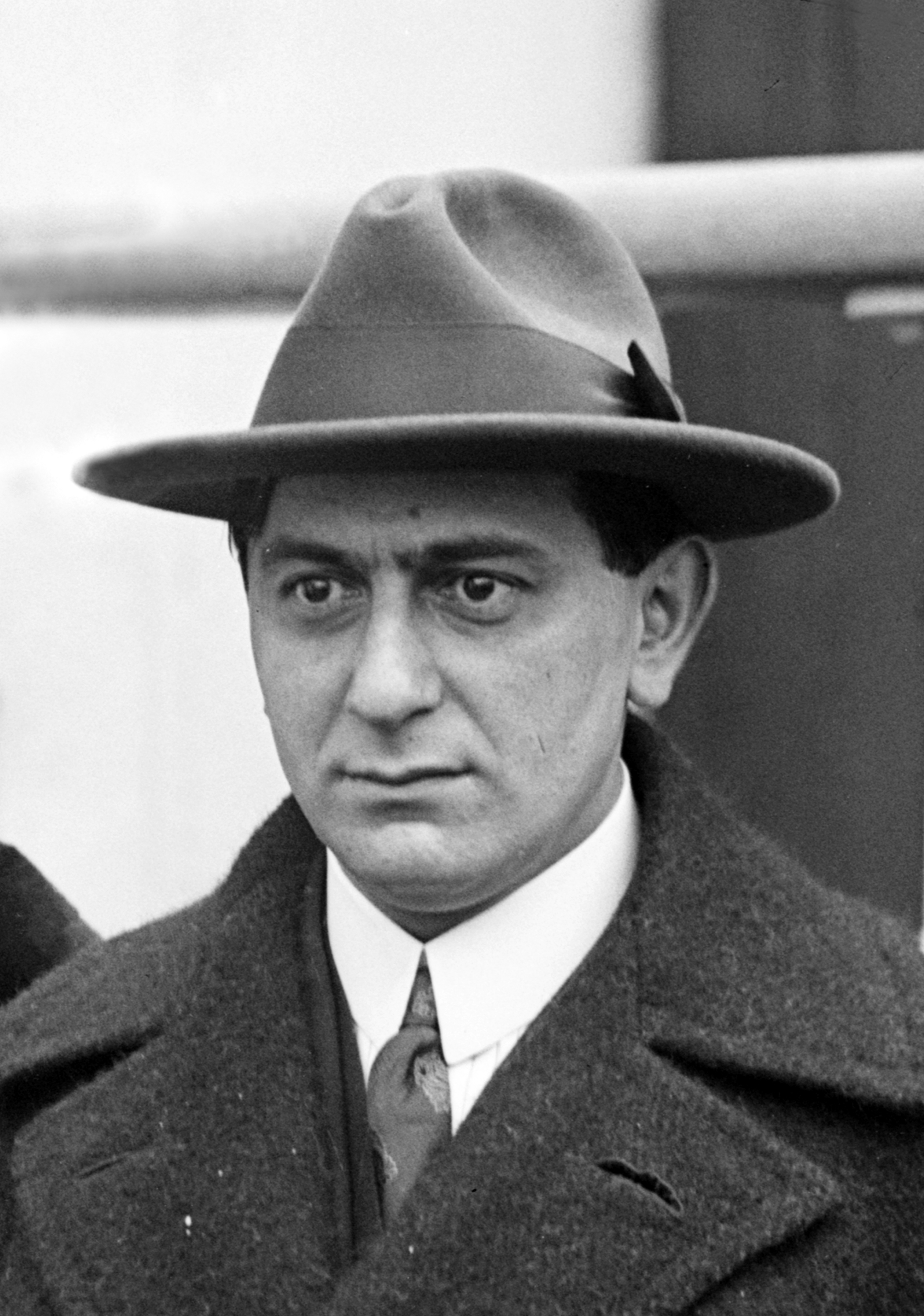
Ernst Lubitsch; Honorary Academy Award recipient

=== Awards ===
Nominees were announced on February 9, 1947. Winners are listed first and highlighted in boldface.

**Best Motion Picture**: **The Best Years of Our Lives – Samuel Goldwyn for RKO Radio Pictures**; Henry V – Laurence Olivier for United Artists; It's a Wonderful Life – Frank Capra for RKO Radio Pictures; The Razor's Edge – Darryl F. Zanuck for 20th Century Fox; The Yearling – Sidney Franklin for Metro-Goldwyn-Mayer	**Best Directing**: **William Wyler – The Best Years of Our Lives**; David Lean – Brief Encounter; Frank Capra – It's a Wonderful Life; Robert Siodmak – The Killers; Clarence Brown – The Yearling
**Best Actor**: **Fredric March – The Best Years of Our Lives as Platoon Sergeant Al Stephenson**; Laurence Olivier – Henry V as King Henry V of England; Larry Parks – The Jolson Story as Al Jolson; Gregory Peck – The Yearling as Ezra "Penny" Baxter; James Stewart – It's a Wonderful Life as George Bailey	**Best Actress**: **Olivia de Havilland – To Each His Own as Miss Josephine "Jody" Norris**; Celia Johnson – Brief Encounter as Laura Jesson; Jennifer Jones – Duel in the Sun as Pearl Chavez; Rosalind Russell – Sister Kenny as Elizabeth Kenny; Jane Wyman – The Yearling as Ora Baxter
**Best Actor in a Supporting Role**: **Harold Russell – The Best Years of Our Lives as Petty Officer 2nd Class Homer Parrish**; Charles Coburn – The Green Years as Alexander Gow; William Demarest – The Jolson Story as Steve Martin; Claude Rains – Notorious as Alexander Sebastian; Clifton Webb – The Razor's Edge as Elliott Templeton	**Best Actress in a Supporting Role**: **Anne Baxter – The Razor's Edge as Sophie MacDonald**; Ethel Barrymore – The Spiral Staircase as Mrs Warren; Lillian Gish – Duel in the Sun as Laura Belle McCanles; Flora Robson – Saratoga Trunk as Angelique Buiton; Gale Sondergaard – Anna and the King of Siam as Lady Thiang
**Best Writing (Original Motion Picture Story)**: **Vacation From Marriage – Clemence Dane**; The Dark Mirror – Vladimir Pozner; The Strange Love of Martha Ivers – Jack Patrick; The Stranger – Victor Trivas; To Each His Own – Charles Brackett	**Best Writing (Original Screenplay)**: **The Seventh Veil – Muriel Box and Sydney Box**; The Blue Dahlia – Raymond Chandler; Children of Paradise – Jacques Prévert; Notorious – Ben Hecht; Road to Utopia – Norman Panama and Melvin Frank
**Best Writing (Screenplay)**: **The Best Years of Our Lives – Robert E. Sherwood from Glory For Me by MacKinlay Kantor**; Anna and the King of Siam – Sally Benson and Talbot Jennings from Anna and the King of Siam by Margaret Landon; Brief Encounter – Anthony Havelock-Allan, David Lean and Ronald Neame from Still Life by Noël Coward; The Killers – Anthony Veiller from "The Killers" by Ernest Hemingway; Rome, Open City – Sergio Amidei and Federico Fellini from a story by Sergio Amidei and Alberto Consiglio	**Best Documentary (Short Subject)**: **Seeds of Destiny – United States Department of War**; Atomic Power – The March of Time; Life at the Zoo – Artkino; Paramount News Issue#37 – Paramount; Traffic with the Devil – Herbert Morgan
**Best Short Subject (One-Reel)**: **Facing Your Danger – Gordon Hollingshead**; Dive-Hi Champs – Jack Eaton; Golden Horses – Edmund Reek; Smart as a Fox – Gordon Hollingshead; Sure Cures – Pete Smith	**Best Short Subject (Two-Reel)**: **A Boy and His Dog – Gordon Hollingshead**; College Queen – George B. Templeton; Hiss and Yell – Jules White; The Luckiest Guy in the World – Jerry Bresler
**Best Short Subject (Cartoon)**: **The Cat Concerto – Fred Quimby**; John Henry and the Inky-Poo – George Pal; Musical Moments from Chopin – Walter Lantz; Squatter's Rights – Walt Disney; Walky Talky Hawky – Edward Selzer	**Best Music (Music Score of a Dramatic or Comedy Picture)**: **The Best Years of Our Lives – Hugo Friedhofer**; Anna and the King of Siam – Bernard Herrmann; Henry V – William Walton; Humoresque – Franz Waxman; The Killers – Miklós Rózsa
**Best Music (Scoring of a Musical Picture)**: **The Jolson Story – Morris Stoloff**; Blue Skies – Robert Emmett Dolan; Centennial Summer – Alfred Newman; The Harvey Girls – Lennie Hayton; Night and Day – Ray Heindorf and Max Steiner	**Best Music (Song)**: **"On the Atchison, Topeka and the Santa Fe" from The Harvey Girls – Music by Harry Warren; Lyrics by Johnny Mercer**; "All Through the Day" from Centennial Summer – Music by Jerome Kern (posthumous nomination); Lyrics by Oscar Hammerstein II; "I Can't Begin to Tell You" from The Dolly Sisters – Music by James V. Monaco (posthumous nomination); Lyrics by Mack Gordon; "Ole Buttermilk Sky" from Canyon Passage – Music by Hoagy Carmichael; Lyrics by Jack Brooks; "You Keep Coming Back Like a Song" from Blue Skies – Music and Lyrics by Irving Berlin; ~~"This Is Always" from Three Little Girls in Blue – Music by Harry Warren and Lyrics by Mack Gordon~~ (nomination revoked)
**Best Sound Recording**: **The Jolson Story – John P. Livadary**; The Best Years of Our Lives – Gordon E. Sawyer; It's a Wonderful Life – John O. Aalberg	**Best Art Direction (Black-and-White)**: **Anna and the King of Siam – Art Direction: Lyle R. Wheeler and William S. Darling; Interior Decoration: Thomas Little and Frank E. Hughes**; Kitty – Art Direction: Hans Dreier and Walter Tyler; Interior Decoration: Samuel M. Comer and Ray Moyer; The Razor's Edge – Art Direction: Richard Day and Nathan H. Juran; Interior Decoration: Thomas Little and Paul S. Fox
**Best Art Direction (Color)**: **The Yearling – Art Direction: Cedric Gibbons and Paul Groesse; Interior Decoration: Edwin B. Willis**; Caesar and Cleopatra – Art Direction and Interior Decoration: John Bryan; Henry V – Art Direction and Interior Decoration: Paul Sheriff and Carmen Dillon	**Best Cinematography (Black-and-White)**: **Anna and the King of Siam – Arthur Miller**; The Green Years – George J. Folsey
**Best Cinematography (Color)**: **The Yearling – Charles Rosher, Leonard Smith and Arthur Arling**; The Jolson Story – Joseph Walker	**Best Film Editing**: **The Best Years of Our Lives – Daniel Mandell**; It's a Wonderful Life – William Hornbeck; The Jolson Story – William Lyon; The Killers – Arthur Hilton; The Yearling – Harold F. Kress
**Best Special Effects**: **Blithe Spirit – Tom Howard**; A Stolen Life – William C. McGann; Special Audible Effects: Nathan Levinson

=== Special awards ===
- To Laurence Olivier for his outstanding achievement as actor, producer and director in bringing Henry V to the screen.
- To Harold Russell for bringing hope and courage to his fellow veterans through his appearance in The Best Years of Our Lives.
- To Ernst Lubitsch for his distinguished contributions to the art of the motion picture.
- To Claude Jarman, Jr., outstanding child actor of 1946.

=== Irving G. Thalberg Memorial Award ===
- Samuel Goldwyn

== Presenters and performers ==
=== Presenters ===
(in order of appearance)

- Jean Hersholt (Presenter: Academy Honorary Award to Laurence Olivier)
- Douglas Fairbanks Jr. (Presenter: Short Subject & Scientific & Technical Awards)
- Rex Harrison (Presenter: Production Awards)
- Lana Turner (Presenter: Scoring Awards)
- Greer Garson (Presenter: Best Art Direction-Interior Decoration)
- Ann Sheridan (Presenter: Best Cinematography)
- Van Johnson (Presenter: Best Original Song)
- Robert Montgomery (Presenter: Writing Awards)
- Shirley Temple (Presenter: Academy Juvenile Award to Claude Jarman Jr. and Academy Honorary Award to Harold Russell)
- Mervyn LeRoy (Presenter: Academy Honorary Award to Ernst Lubitsch)
- Ronald Reagan (Presenter: Academy Cavalcade of Past Oscar Winners and Academy Parade of Stars)
- Billy Wilder (Presenter: Best Director)
- Eric Johnston (Presenter: Best Motion Picture)
- Donald Nelson (Presenter: Irving G. Thalberg Memorial Award to Samuel Goldwyn)
- Anne Revere (Presenter: Best Supporting Actor)
- Lionel Barrymore (Presenter: Best Supporting Actress)
- Joan Fontaine (Presenter: Best Actor)
- Ray Milland (Presenter: Best Actress)

=== Performers ===
- Hoagy Carmichael (who was accidentally introduced by Sam Goldwyn as Hugo Carmicheal)
- Dick Haymes
- Andy Russell
- Dinah Shore

== Multiple nominations and awards ==
Films with multiple nominations
Nominations	Film
8	The Best Years of Our Lives
7	The Yearling
6	The Jolson Story
5	Anna and the King of Siam
5	It's a Wonderful Life
4	Henry V
4	The Killers
4	The Razor's Edge
3	Brief Encounter
2	Blue Skies
2	Centennial Summer
2	Duel in the Sun
2	The Green Years
2	The Harvey Girls
2	Notorious
2	To Each His Own

Films with multiple awards
Awards	Film
7	The Best Years of Our Lives
2	Anna and the King of Siam
2	The Jolson Story
2	The Yearling

== See also ==
- 4th Golden Globe Awards
- 1946 in film
- 1st Tony Awards
