= Life at the Zoo =

1946 film

- Release date: 1946
- Country: Russia
- Language: Russian

Life at the Zoo (Russian: Жизнь в зоопарке, romanized: Zhizn v zooparke) is a 1946 Soviet short documentary film. At the 19th Academy Awards, it was nominated for Best Documentary Short.
