= 4th Golden Globe Awards =

Film award ceremony in 1947

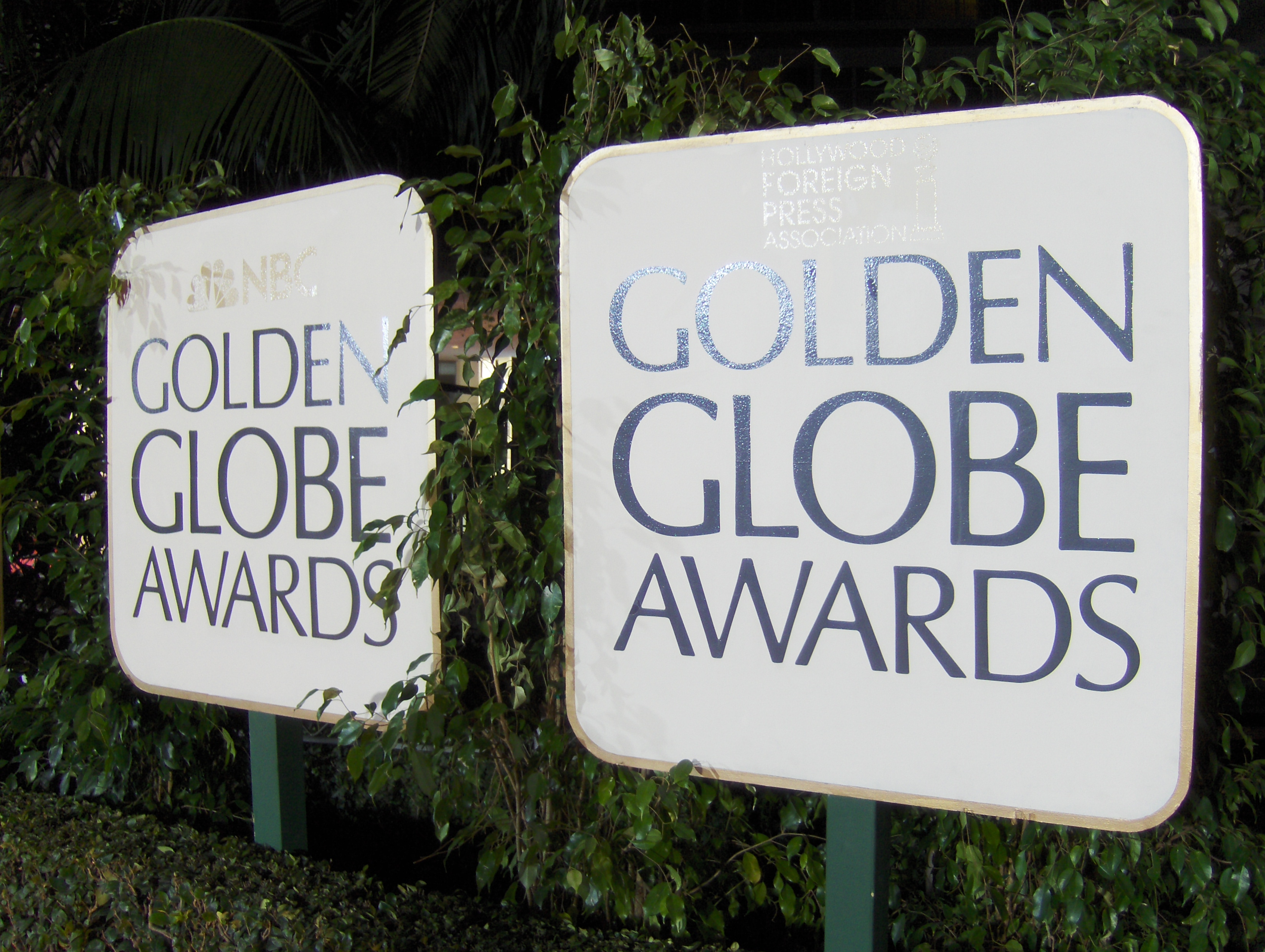
- Date: February 26, 1947
- Site: Hollywood Roosevelt Hotel

Highlights
- Best Picture: The Best Years of Our Lives
- Most awards: The Best Years of Our Lives; The Razor's Edge (2)

The 4th Golden Globe Awards, honoring the best achievements in 1946 filmmaking, were held on February 26, 1947 at the Hollywood Roosevelt Hotel in Los Angeles, California.

== Winners ==
=== Best Picture ===
- The Best Years of Our Lives directed by William Wyler

=== Best Actor in a Leading Role ===
- Gregory Peck – The Yearling

=== Best Actress in a Leading Role ===
- Rosalind Russell – Sister Kenny

=== Best Performance by an Actor in a Supporting Role in a Motion Picture ===
- Clifton Webb – The Razor's Edge

=== Best Performance by an Actress in a Supporting Role in a Motion Picture ===
- Anne Baxter – The Razor's Edge

=== Best Director-Motion Picture ===
- Frank Capra – It's a Wonderful Life

=== Best Film Promoting International Understanding ===
- The Last Chance directed by Leopold Lindtberg

=== Special Achievement Award ===
- Harold Russell – The Best Years of Our Lives

== See also ==
- Hollywood Foreign Press Association
- 1st Cannes Film Festival
- 19th Academy Awards
- 1946 in film
