= The Razor's Edge (1984 film) =

American historical drama film by John Byrum

- Theatrical release poster by Tom Jung
- Directed by: John Byrum
- Screenplay by: John Byrum; Bill Murray
- Based on: The Razor's Edge; 1944 novel by W. Somerset Maugham
- Produced by: Robert P. Marcucci; Harry Benn
- Starring: Bill Murray; Theresa Russell; Catherine Hicks; Denholm Elliott; James Keach
- Cinematography: Peter Hannan
- Edited by: Peter Boyle
- Music by: Jack Nitzsche
- Distributed by: Columbia Pictures
- Release date: October 19, 1984
- Running time: 129 minutes
- Country: United States
- Language: English
- Budget: $12 million–$13 million
- Box office: $6.6 million

The Razor's Edge is a 1984 American historical drama film directed and co-written by John Byrum starring Bill Murray, Theresa Russell, Catherine Hicks, Denholm Elliott, Brian Doyle-Murray, and James Keach. The film follows Larry Darrell, a traumatized World War I veteran who goes on a quest for meaning that leads him through Paris and to the Indian Himalayas. It is an adaptation of W. Somerset Maugham's 1944 novel of the same name, the second after Edmund Goulding's 1946 film. The book's epigraph is dramatized as advice from the Katha Upanishad: "The path to salvation is narrow and as difficult to walk as a razor's edge."

Development of The Razor's Edge began in the early 1980s, with Byrum and Murray collaborating on the film's screenplay. The film marked the first starring role in a dramatic film for Murray, known primarily for his comedic roles. Principal photography began in the summer of 1983, with filming taking place on location in Paris and the Indian Himalayas, as well as at EMI-Elstree Studios in England.

The Razor's Edge was released by Columbia Pictures on October 19, 1984. It was met with largely unfavorable reviews from film critics, and was a box-office bomb, grossing $6.6 million against a budget of approximately $12 million.

== Plot ==
In 1917 Illinois, before the United States joins World War I, a fair is planned to raise money to support Gray Maturin and Larry Darrell, who are joining the war in Europe as ambulance drivers. At the front, commanding officer Piedmont has both of them armed. Larry witnesses the deaths of soldiers and fellow ambulance drivers. By the time the United States enters the war, Larry's unit is down to a few men. During an unexpected encounter with German soldiers, Piedmont dies saving Larry's life. After the war ends the two friends return to the United States. Larry rejects plans to work for Gray's father as a stockbroker, delays his engagement to his sweetheart Isabel, and travels to Paris to find meaning in his life.

Larry lives a simple life in Paris, and saves the life of an elder miner who lends him a copy of the Upanishads, and suggests that he travel to India to broaden his perspective on life's meaning. Larry joins a Buddhist monastery in India. He finds inner peace meditating atop a snow-covered mountain, but a monk informs him his journey isn't over. Returning to Paris, Larry learns Isabel has married Gray, had two children, and suffered due to the Great Depression. Larry finds his friend Sophie lost her husband and child and turned to alcohol, opium, and prostitution.

Larry attempts to reform Sophie, and they become engaged though Isabel reveals she still loves Larry. She confronts Sophie, who goes missing. Larry finds her at an opium den, having relapsed, and Larry is unable to rescue her. When she is found murdered, Larry confronts Isabel who admits responsibility for the relapse and chastises Larry for ruining their lives. Larry comforts Isabel by explaining his journey had been to honour Piedmont's sacrifice. Isabel and Larry part peacefully, and plans to return to the United States, which he calls "home".

== Cast ==
- Bill Murray as Larry Darrell
- Theresa Russell as Sophie MacDonald
- Catherine Hicks as Isabel Bradley
- Denholm Elliott as Elliott Templeton
- James Keach as Gray Maturin
- Peter Vaughan as Mackenzie
- Brian Doyle-Murray as Piedmont
- Faith Brook as Louisa Bradley
- Saeed Jaffrey as Raaz
- Richard Oldfield as Doug Van Allen
- André Maranne as Joseph, the Butler
- Bruce Boa as Maturin

== Production ==
=== Development ===
According to an interview with director John Byrum published on August 8, 2006, in the San Francisco Bay Guardian, he had wanted to film an adaptation of Maugham's book in the early 1980s. The director brought a copy of the book to his friend Margaret "Mickey" Kelley, who was in the hospital after giving birth. Byrum remembers getting a call the next day at 4:00 am, "and it was Mickey's husband, Bill [Murray]. He said, 'This is Larry, Larry Darrell.'"

Byrum and Murray drove across America while writing the screenplay. What they had written did not resemble the previous film version. Murray included a farewell speech to his recently deceased friend John Belushi in the script; this appears as Larry Darrell's farewell speech to Piedmont, a fellow ambulance driver in World War I.

While Murray was attached to the project, Byrum had trouble finding a studio to finance it. At one stage, 20th Century Fox planned to make it. Murray wanted to play the part because "it was a different kind of character, calmer, more self-aware."

Dan Aykroyd suggested that Murray could appear in Ghostbusters for Columbia Pictures in exchange for the studio's approving to make The Razor's Edge; Murray agreed and a deal was made with Columbia.

=== Filming ===
Principal photography began on July 4, 1983 and continued through that fall, with shooting taking place in London, Paris, and the Indian Himalayas. The film's budget was estimated at "slightly under" $12 million, though other sources indicate $13 million.

Executive Producer Rob Cohen said, "It's a timeless story about someone looking for values in this world. It's about a transition. Well, who can make a more extreme transition, somebody like Bill Hurt, who looks pensive to begin with, and will wind up simply a little more spiritual than he was in the first place, or a Bill Murray, who can begin as the class clown, go to war, come back, and having had traumatic experiences, start to question?"

== Release ==
The Razor's Edge was released theatrically by Columbia Pictures on October 19, 1984.

=== Home media ===
RCA/Columbia Pictures Home Video released The Razor's Edge on VHS in 1985. Columbia TriStar Home Entertainment issued a DVD edition in 2002. The film was released for the first time on Blu-ray by Sony Pictures Home Entertainment on October 18, 2022.

== Reception ==
=== Box office ===
The film was a commercial failure, grossing a little more than $6 million.

=== Critical response ===
Janet Maslin of The New York Times called the film "slow, overlong, and ridiculously overproduced," as well as "so disjointed that Mr. Murray, for all his wise-cracking inappropriateness, is all that holds it together." Roger Ebert gave the film two-and-a-half stars out of four and judged the movie "flawed," pointing to the hero as "too passive, too contained, too rich in self-irony, to really sweep us along in his quest." He placed the blame on Murray's shoulders, saying he "plays the hero as if fate is a comedian and he is the straight man".

Todd McCarthy of Variety wrote, "Conceived as a major career departure for comic star Bill Murray, The Razor's Edge emerges as a minimally acceptable adaptation of W. Somerset Maugham's superb novel. Tonally inconsistent and structurally awkward, film does develop some dramatic interest in the second half, but inherent power of the material is never realized." Gene Siskel of the Chicago Tribune gave the film three stars out of four and remarked that "the movie stands or falls on whether Murray is able to disappear into his character of a young man searching for meaning in life after experiencing the horror of World War I. The feeling here is that Murray successfully meets that challenge by playing his character with both a quick comic tongue and with soulful eyes. His character's sense of humor is vintage Murray; his soulfulness is deep and genuine."

Patrick Goldstein of the Los Angeles Times wrote, "It's possible that moviegoers will find this mystic glider ride to the snowcapped peaks of the Himalayas painfully earnest, especially for a comic of Murray's wise-guy gifts. But Murray, in his first serious role, is anything but miscast. He's perhaps the best thing about this intriguing but stubbornly ineffectual drama that only fitfully revives the dated charm of Maugham's rambling, meditative novel." Paul Attanasio of The Washington Post wrote that "this longtime pet project of Murray's will only disappoint his fans," finding the juxtaposition of Murray's comedic sensibility with the 1920s setting "jarringly bizarre" and the supporting cast "uniformly lousy."

==== Retrospective reviews ====
Since its release, The Razor's Edge has developed a small cult following. In a 2014 poll by readers of Rolling Stone, the film ranked as Murray's tenth-best feature film. On the review aggregator website Rotten Tomatoes, 47% of 19 critics' reviews are positive. Metacritic, which uses a weighted average, assigned the film a score of 47 out of 100, based on 9 critics, indicating "mixed or average" reviews.

Nathan Rabin of The A.V. Club, reviewing the film in 2007, felt, "If The Razor's Edge is ultimately a failure, it's an honest, noble one", and that there were "all manner of minor pleasures to be gleaned along the way."

Murray stated he deluded himself that there would be major interest in the film as a period piece, while the studio wanted to make a modern movie. Afterwards Murray realized his mistake, but said he still would have found the experience worth it even if the film had never been released.

== See also ==
- The Razor's Edge, a 1946 adaptation with Tyrone Power and Gene Tierney

== Sources ==
- Schnakenberg, Robert (2015). The Big Bad Book of Bill Murray: A Critical Appreciation of the World's Finest Actor. Philadelphia, Pennsylvania: Quirk Books. ISBN 978-1-594-74822-6.
