= Sister Kenny =

1946 American film by Dudley Nichols

- Film poster
- Directed by: Dudley Nichols; Jack Gage (dialogue director)
- Screenplay by: Dudley Nichols; Alexander Knox; Mary McCarthy
- Based on: And They Shall Walk; 1943 book by Elizabeth Kenny; Martha Ostenso
- Produced by: Dudley Nichols
- Starring: Rosalind Russell; Alexander Knox; Dean Jagger
- Cinematography: George Barnes
- Edited by: Roland Gross
- Music by: Alexander Tansman
- Distributed by: RKO Radio Pictures
- Release dates: September 29, 1946 (Premiere-New York City); October 10, 1946 (U.S.)
- Running time: 116 min
- Language: English

Sister Kenny is a 1946 American biographical film about Sister Elizabeth Kenny, an Australian bush nurse, who fought to help people who suffered from polio, despite opposition from the medical establishment. The film stars Rosalind Russell, Alexander Knox, and Philip Merivale.

The film was adapted by Alexander Knox, Mary McCarthy, Milton Gunzburg (uncredited), and Dudley Nichols from the book And They Shall Walk, by Elizabeth Kenny and Martha Ostenso, and directed by Dudley Nichols.

== Plot ==
In 1911, Elizabeth Kenny returns from nursing school in Brisbane, Australia, to her home in the bush of Queensland. Her mentor, Dr. McDonnell, is chief at the nearest hospital, 50 miles away. He wants her to work with him, but she wants to be a bush nurse. He says she will not last six months. Three years later, Elizabeth visits a ranch to treat a young girl, Dorrie, who is contorted in agony. She describes the symptoms in a telegram to McDonnell. His reply: infantile paralysis, no known treatment, "do the best you can with the symptoms..." Elizabeth treats "spasming" muscles with heat, wrapping Dorrie in steaming flannel. After the contractions subside, Dorrie cannot move her legs or sit up. Through close observation, Elizabeth realizes that she is not paralyzed. Her muscles have become "alienated". After her muscles are "re-educated", Dorrie makes a complete recovery, as do five other cases of polio that Elizabeth treats.

Elizabeth takes Dorrie to see McDonnell. She assumes that she has done the usual thing in treating polio and is horrified to learn that infantile paralysis is a deadly, crippling disease and that the standard treatment is agonizing immobilization. McDonnell believes that Elizabeth has discovered an entirely new way of treating polio. He takes her to Dr. Brack, the most senior expert. Brack scoffs at her theory and refuses to consider the possibility that the science of the past 50 years may be wrong. When Dorrie does cartwheels, Brack contends that she never had polio.

McDonnell suggests that Elizabeth treat the patients that doctors have given up on. At that time, Australian nurses had to be single; she is about to marry Captain Kevin Connors. Elizabeth's clinic shuts down. She took 12 "paralyzed" patients, and seven walked out. Doctors argue that they never had polio. Kevin leaves to fight in World War I. Elizabeth joins the Army and finds him in a hospital at the front.

She returns to Australia with the rank of Sister to wait for Kevin. Then she reads about an outbreak in Townsville and goes there. Kevin appears. She has written to him, ending their engagement. She does not think she will ever be done with polio. Kevin watches as she talks to a new patient and leaves without another word.

In the 1920s, Sister Kenny heads to Brisbane. Some time later, the Elizabeth Kenny Clinic is being closed. She confronts Dr. Brack while he is lecturing on polio to a group of orthopedists. Brack invites her to speak and then belittles her and her treatment. One of the doctors is from the Queensland Health Department. He invites her to his office. Another interested orthopedist arrives, followed by McDonnell. They have been working on getting a Royal Commission to investigate the Kenny treatment. She has an invitation from England. She feels hopeless, but a crowd outside cheers for her.

She travels around Europe, becoming famous. Kevin meets her at Croydon airport. He is glad it turned out this way. He hands her a paper with news of the Munich Agreement.

The Royal Commission condemns her. Reviews of her book are scathing. However, all the younger men are using the Kenny Treatment, whether they call it that or not. In America, she is "given the runaround". Out of money, she plans to go home. A reporter reads her a press release from the University of Minnesota, stating that the Kenny method will form the basis of all future treatment. She is wanted in Minneapolis, where there is a polio epidemic. After three years' work in Minneapolis, Sister Kenny dictates a letter to Dr. McDonnell. A national committee is about to report on her work in the U.S. She is about to lecture to orthopedic surgeons. The new book is out. She receives three honorary degrees. A cable arrives: Dr. McDonnell has died.

The lecture hall is full. The medical director of the institute introduces her. The news broadcast of the committee report is piped in. It is devastating. Furious, the director points to the real results. The lecture continues. At the end, a crowd of children gathers outside the Institute, singing "Happy Birthday" to Sister Kenny.

== Cast ==
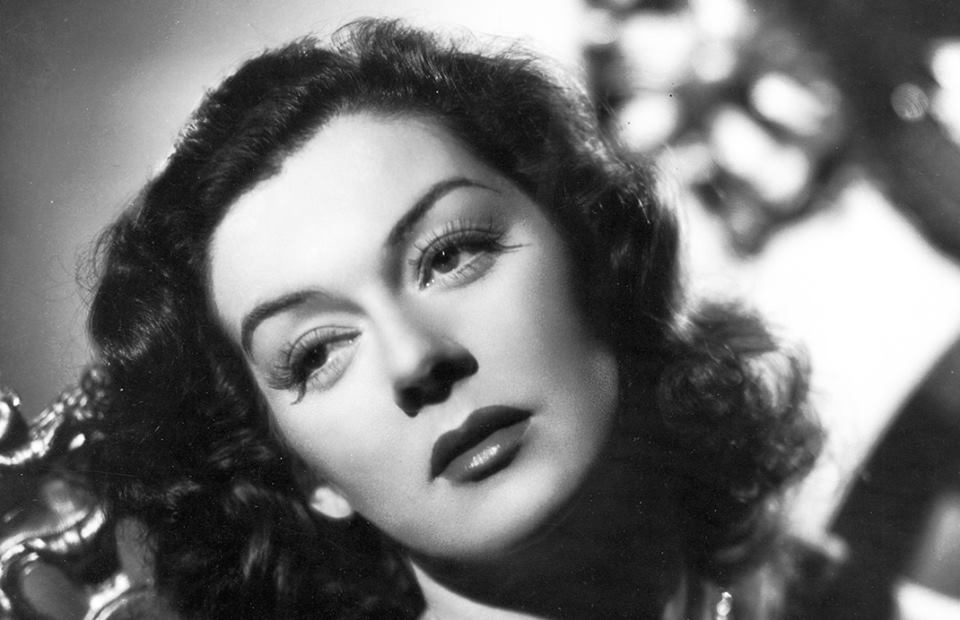
Russell in 1940

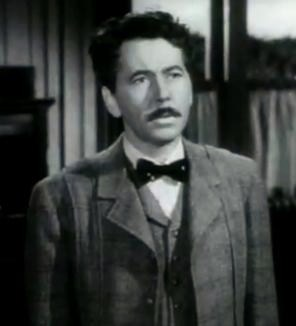
Alexander Knox in the trailer of Sister Kenny

- Rosalind Russell as Elizabeth Kenny
- Alexander Knox as Dr. McDonnell
- Dean Jagger as Kevin Connors
- Philip Merivale as Dr. Brack
- Beulah Bondi as Mary Kenny
- Charles Dingle as Michael Kenny
- John Litel as Medical Director
- Doreen McCann as Dorrie
- Regis Toomey as a reporter
- Fay Helm as Mrs. McIntyre
- Charles Kemper as Mr. McIntyre
- Dorothy Peterson as Agnes
- Ray Walker as Doctor at Minneapolis Lecture

== Reception ==
The film recorded a loss of $660,000 for RKO.

Box office returns were disappointing even in Australia. It flopped in Brisbane, Kenny's hometown.

== Awards and nominations ==
Award	Category	Nominee	Result	Ref.
Academy Awards	Best Actress	Rosalind Russell	Nominated	
Golden Globe Awards	Best Actress in a Leading Role	Rosalind Russell	Won	
Venice Film Festival	Best Feature Film	Dudley Nichols	Nominated	
