= The Razor's Edge (1946 film) =

1946 film by Edmund Goulding

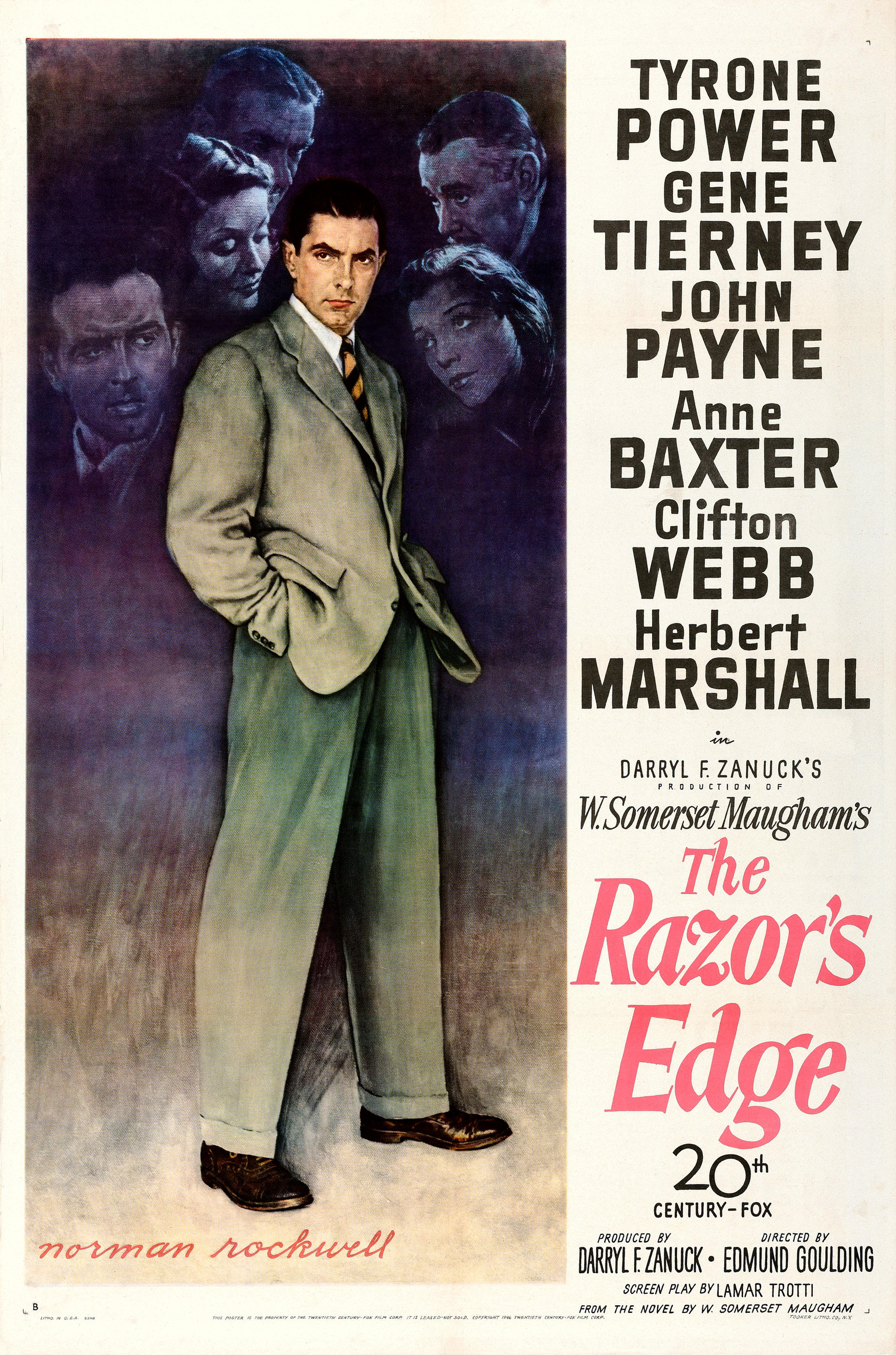
- Theatrical release poster by Norman Rockwell
- Directed by: Edmund Goulding
- Screenplay by: Lamar Trotti; Darryl F. Zanuck (uncredited)
- Based on: The Razor's Edge by W. Somerset Maugham
- Produced by: Darryl F. Zanuck
- Starring: Tyrone Power; Gene Tierney; John Payne; Herbert Marshall; Anne Baxter; Clifton Webb
- Cinematography: Arthur C. Miller
- Edited by: J. Watson Webb Jr.
- Music by: Alfred Newman; Edmund Goulding (uncredited)
- Distributed by: 20th Century-Fox
- Release dates: November 19, 1946 (Roxy Theatre); December 25, 1946 (United States)
- Running time: 145 minutes
- Country: United States
- Language: English
- Budget: $1.2 million
- Box office: $5 million (est. US/ Canada rentals)

The Razor's Edge is a 1946 American drama film based on W. Somerset Maugham's 1944 novel of the same name. It stars Tyrone Power, Gene Tierney, John Payne, Anne Baxter, Clifton Webb, and Herbert Marshall, with a supporting cast including Lucile Watson, Frank Latimore, and Elsa Lanchester. Marshall plays Somerset Maugham. The film was directed by Edmund Goulding.

The Razor's Edge tells the story of Larry Darrell, an American pilot traumatized by his experiences in World War I, who sets off in search of some transcendent meaning in his life. The story begins through the eyes of Larry's friends and acquaintances as they witness his personality change after the war. His rejection of conventional life and search for meaningful experience allows him to thrive while the more materialistic characters suffer reversals of fortune.

The Razor's Edge was nominated for four Academy Awards, including Best Motion Picture, with Anne Baxter winning the Academy Award for Best Supporting Actress.

== Plot ==
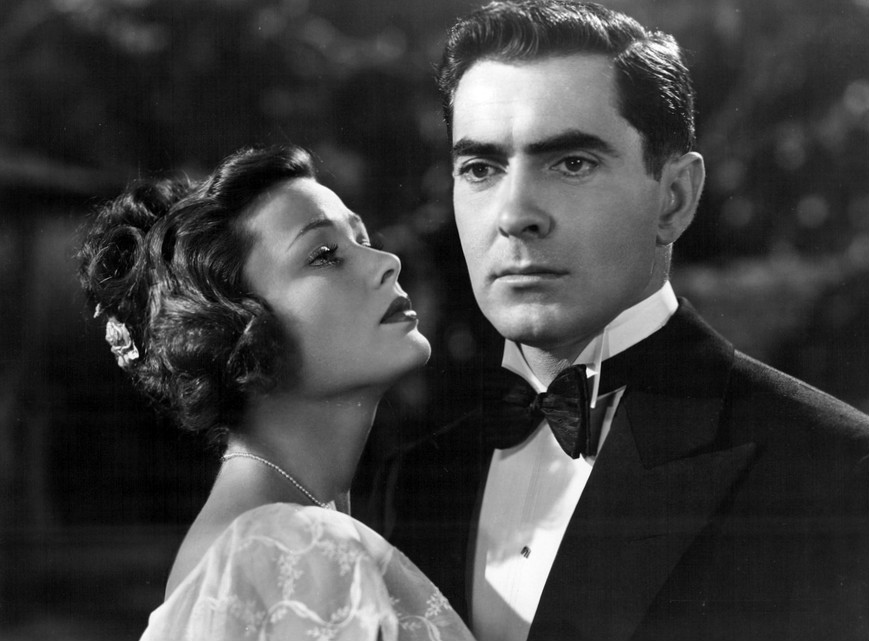
Gene Tierney and Tyrone Power in The Razor's Edge

Elliott Templeton, an American expatriate living in France, returns to the United States after the Great War. His niece Isabel is engaged to marry Larry Darrell, recently returned from the war. Traumatized by his war service, Larry is uninterested in working to support Isabel and plans to live on a $3,000 annual inheritance. Larry and Isabel postpone their wedding so he can go to Paris to discover the meaning of life.

Larry lives the life of a student in Paris for a year. When Isabel and her mother arrive, Larry asks her to marry him, but she breaks off the engagement, unwilling to live in poverty. She marries millionaire Gray Maturin instead, acquiring wealth and status. A drunk defrocked priest working with Larry in a coal mine convinces him to travel to India to learn from a mystic. Larry experiences a moment of enlightenment at a Himalayan monastery, and is urged to return to society with his newfound spiritual awareness.

Larry learns Isabel and her family were ruined by the stock market crash of 1929 and are living with Elliott. Writer W. Somerset Maugham arranges for Elliott and his household to meet Larry. They encounter Larry's childhood friend Sophie Nelson, who turned to drugs, alcohol and prostitution following the death of her husband and child. Isabel has chosen estrangement from Sophie but when Larry proposes marriage to her, Isabel begins to act charitably toward her.

At a group luncheon at the Ritz, Elliott drinks Persovka, and Isabel has more sent to the apartment. She arranges to meet Sophie to arrange the gift of a wedding dress, and manipulates Sophie into relapsing by invoking memories of her dead daughter and leaving her alone with the Persovka. When Sophie subsequently disappears, Larry searches through seedy bars, following the trail of a woman demanding Persovka. When he finds Sophie at an opium den she flees. A year later, she is murdered in Toulon.

Maugham and Larry visit Elliott on his deathbed in Nice. He tells Gray that he can repay his father's debts and rebuild the family business. Larry plans to leave France after Elliott's death, by working on a tramp steamer. Isabel professes her love to Larry and confesses to instigating Sophie's relapse, as a way of saving Larry from Sophie's weakness. Larry feels consolation that Sophie would have preferred to be reunited with her dead husband and child. Isabel is left confused by Larry who she feels still does not understand what he wants. Maugham explains that in fact, Larry found exactly what most people desire but fail to achieve.

The film closes on a shot of Larry hoisting cargo on the deck of a storm-tossed ship.

== Cast ==
- Tyrone Power as Larry Darrell
- Gene Tierney as Isabel Bradley
- John Payne as Gray Maturin
- Anne Baxter as Sophie MacDonald
- Clifton Webb as Elliott Templeton
- Herbert Marshall as W. Somerset Maugham
- Lucile Watson as Louisa Bradley
- Frank Latimore as Bob MacDonald
- Elsa Lanchester as Miss Keith
- Cecil Humphreys as the Holy Man
- Fritz Kortner as Kosti
- Ted Billings as Miner (uncredited)
- Eugene Borden as Sea Captain (uncredited)
- Reed Hadley as Party Waiter (voice, uncredited)
- Stanislas Bielski as Man at Bar (uncredited)

== Production history ==
20th Century Fox purchased the film rights from Maugham in March 1945 for $50,000 plus 20% of the film's net profits. The contract stipulated that Maugham would receive an additional $50,000 if the film did not start shooting by February 2, 1946. In August 1945, producer Darryl F. Zanuck had the second unit begin shooting in the mountains around Denver, Colorado, which were to portray the Himalayas in the film. The stars had not yet been cast; Larry Darrell was played by a stand-in and was filmed in extreme long shot. Zanuck wanted Tyrone Power to star and delayed casting until Power finished his service in the Marines in January 1946.

Zanuck originally hired George Cukor to direct, but creative differences led to Cukor's removal. Although Maugham wanted his friend (whom he had in mind when he created the character) Gene Tierney for Isabel, Zanuck chose Maureen O'Hara but told her not to tell anyone. As O'Hara recounted in her autobiography, she shared the secret with Linda Darnell, but Zanuck found out, fired O'Hara, and hired Tierney. Betty Grable and Judy Garland were originally considered for the role of Sophie before Baxter was cast. Maugham wrote an early draft of the screenplay but not one word of his version was used in the final script, and as a result Maugham declined Zanuck's request to write a sequel, and never worked in Hollywood again.

== Release ==
On November 19, 1946, the film had its New York premiere at the Roxy Theatre in Manhattan. Motion Picture Herald described it as New York's "largest and most star-studded motion picture premiere since the war" with crowds of onlookers causing a traffic-blocking jam on 50th Street and Seventh Avenue. The premiere was screened to a capacity audience of 5,886 featuring "screen, stage and radio stars, UN delegates, New York society, top-flight film executives and out of-town film critics." The opening at Roxy grossed $165,000 in its first week, surpassing the previous Roxy record set by The Cock-Eyed World in 1929 which grossed $160,000. An extensive advertising campaign had been launched to promote the film's premiere, which Motion Picture Herald dubbed "impressive in scope, even for so blasé a city as New York." Twentieth Century Fox's advertising director Charles Schlaifer helmed the campaign, organizing expansive outdoor billboards, posters on transportation lines, window displays and electric signs — alongside a sweeping newspaper and radio campaign. The publication further noted: "One was continuously conscious of promotion over the airwaves every time the radio was turned on."

The film was released wide by Twentieth Century Fox on December 25, 1946, in 300 locations across the United States.

== Reception ==
New York Times film critic Bosley Crowther panned The Razor's Edge, complaining of its inability to explain the protagonist's spiritual awakening, and of "glib but vacuous dialogue" that hamstrung the actors, shortcomings he blamed on the limitations of the underlying Maugham story, which, said Crowther, was "a vague and uncertain encroachment upon a mystical moral realm, more emotional than intellectual."

== Awards and nominations ==
Award	Category	Nominee(s)	Result	Ref.
Academy Awards	Best Motion Picture	20th Century Fox	Nominated	
Academy Awards	Best Supporting Actor	Clifton Webb	Nominated	
Academy Awards	Best Supporting Actress	Anne Baxter	Won	
Academy Awards	Best Art Direction – Black-and-White	Art Direction: Richard Day and Nathan Juran; Interior Decoration: Thomas Little and Paul S. Fox	Nominated	
Golden Globe Awards	Best Supporting Actor – Motion Picture	Clifton Webb	Won	
Golden Globe Awards	Best Supporting Actress – Motion Picture	Anne Baxter	Won	

== See also ==
- The Razor's Edge, a 1984 adaptation with Bill Murray, Theresa Russell, Catherine Hicks, Denholm Elliott, and James Keach
