= The Best Years of Our Lives =

1946 American drama film directed by William Wyler

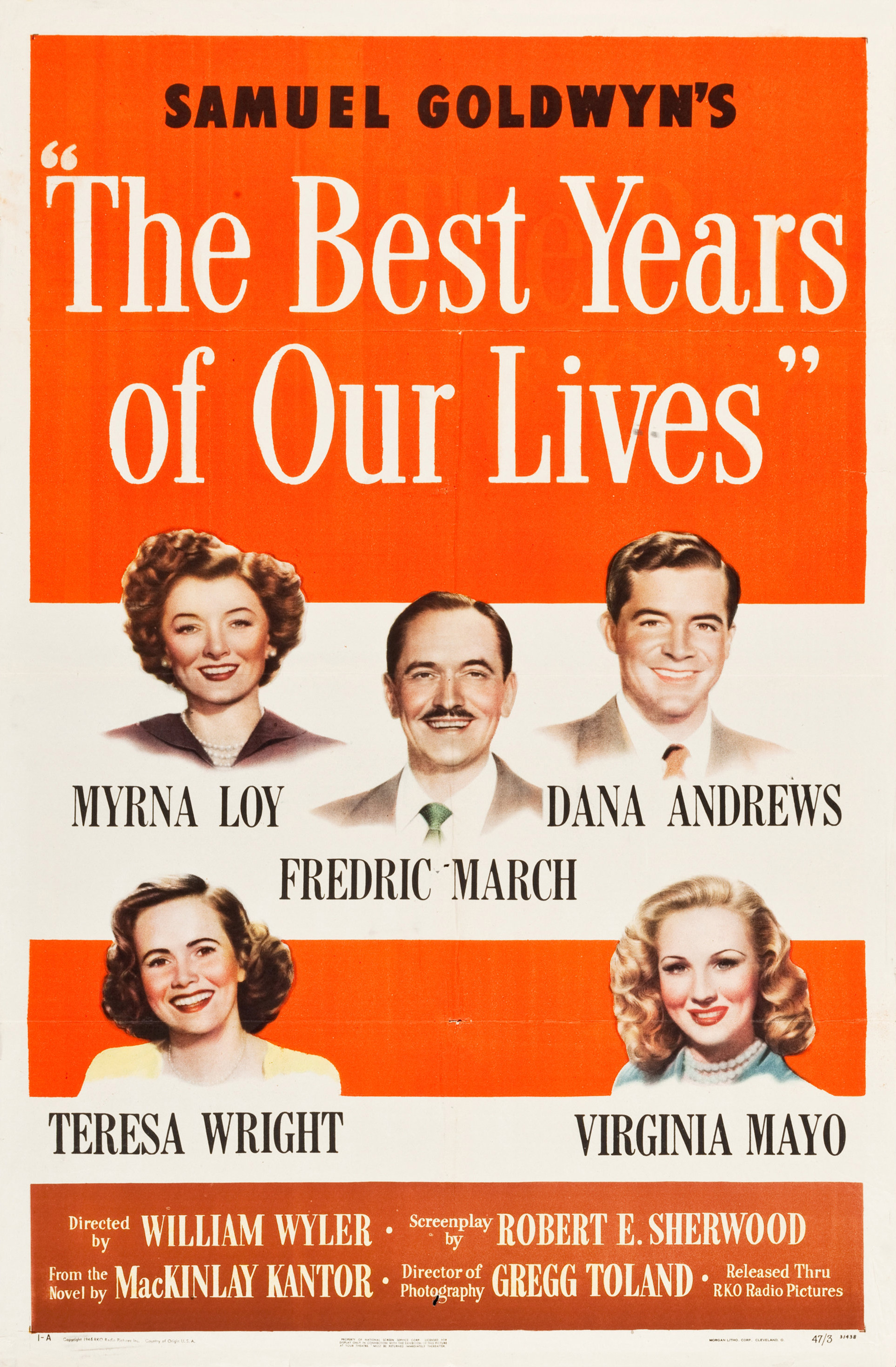
- Theatrical release poster
- Directed by: William Wyler
- Screenplay by: Robert E. Sherwood
- Based on: Glory for Me; 1945 novella by MacKinlay Kantor
- Produced by: Samuel Goldwyn
- Starring: Myrna Loy; Fredric March; Dana Andrews; Teresa Wright; Virginia Mayo; Harold Russell
- Cinematography: Gregg Toland
- Edited by: Daniel Mandell
- Music by: Hugo Friedhofer (composer); Emil Newman (musical director)
- Production company: Samuel Goldwyn Productions
- Distributed by: RKO Radio Pictures
- Release dates: November 21, 1946 (New York City, premiere)
- Running time: 172 minutes
- Country: United States
- Language: English
- Budget: $2.1 million or $3 million
- Box office: $23.7 million

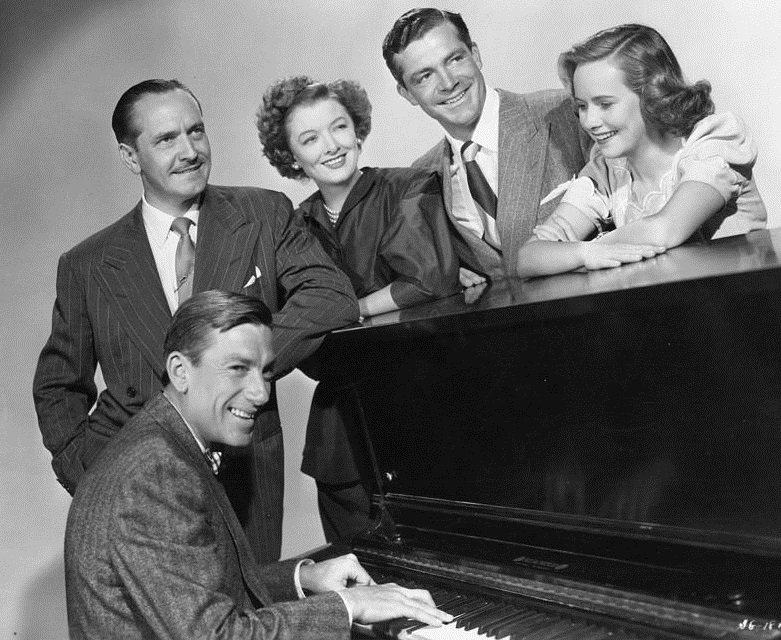
Standing (left to right): Fredric March, Myrna Loy, Dana Andrews, Teresa Wright; seated at piano: Hoagy Carmichael

The Best Years of Our Lives (also known as Glory for Me and Home Again) is a 1946 American epic drama film directed by William Wyler and starring Myrna Loy, Fredric March, Dana Andrews, Teresa Wright, Virginia Mayo and Harold Russell. The film depicts three United States servicemen returning from World War II and re-adjusting to societal changes and civilian life. The men come from different military branches, with different ranks that do not correspond with their civilian social class backgrounds.

The film is credited for its portrayal of post-World War II era hardships and of reincorporation of veterans into society after their often traumatic terms in the US military. It is one of the earliest films to address such issues, dealing with concerns such as PTSD and a resurgence of isolationist policy. There are prescient references to nuclear destruction, and to reintegration policies with veterans that extended into the Vietnam War era and beyond.

The Best Years of Our Lives was a critical and commercial success, winning seven Academy Awards: Best Picture, Best Director (William Wyler), Best Actor (Fredric March), Best Film Editing (Daniel Mandell), Best Adapted Screenplay (Robert E. Sherwood), and Best Original Score (Hugo Friedhofer). In addition, for his role as Parrish, Russell won the Academy Award for Best Supporting Actor. He had received an honorary Oscar for ''bringing aid and comfort to disabled veterans through the medium of motion pictures.'' The special award was created because the Board of Governors wanted to salute Russell, a non-professional actor, but assumed he had little chance for a competitive win. It was the only time in Oscar history that the academy awarded two Oscars for the same performance.

In 1989, The Best Years of Our Lives was one of the first 25 films selected by the Library of Congress for preservation in the United States National Film Registry for being "culturally, historically, or aesthetically significant". It was the highest-grossing film in both the United States and United Kingdom since the release of Gone with the Wind. In 2004, it was named the sixth most-attended film of all time in the UK, with over 20 million tickets sold.

== Plot ==
Three returning World War II veterans meet on a flight to their midwestern hometown of Boone City. USAAF bombardier captain Fred Derry had been a drugstore soda jerk who lived with his father and stepmother on the wrong side of the tracks. Before shipping out, Fred married Marie after a whirlwind romance. Marie has since been working in a nightclub to fill her time despite receiving Fred's combat pay as an Air Force officer. U.S. Army sergeant Al Stephenson is a bank executive; he, his wife Milly and their children Peggy and Rob live in a luxury apartment. U.S. Navy petty officer Homer Parrish was a star high school athlete living with his middle-class parents and younger sister, and dating his next-door neighbor Wilma, whom he intended to marry upon his return from the war.

Each man faces challenges integrating back into civilian life. Homer lost both hands in the war; he is reluctant to return home and face his well-meaning parents and their friends, who have a hard time seeing past his disability. Homer can deftly use his mechanical hooks, but hesitates to display affection for Wilma as he cannot believe she will still want to marry him. Al, tired and jaded, returns to the bank and is given a promotion, but wrestles with alcohol. Fred suffers from PTSD flashbacks and struggles to find a job beyond menial work, befitting a military officer.

Fred arrives home and cannot locate his party girl wife, who does not expect him. The Stephensons and Peggy invite Fred to join them, bar-hopping to celebrate Al's return. An inebriated Fred keeps asking Peggy who she is; she humorously reminds him she's "Al's daughter." When Fred can't get into his apartment, the Stephensons offer him a bed for the night. Later, Peggy calms Fred during a nightmare and they develop a mutual attraction. After meeting Marie during an outing orchestrated by Peggy, she concludes Marie is shallow and materialistic. Peggy determines to break up Fred's marriage, much to Al's consternation.

Frustrated and depressed by his loss of independence; and concerned that Wilma doesn't fully understand the difficulties of being married to him, Homer demonstrates how she'll need to assist him when he removes his prosthetic hands at bedtime, leaving him helpless. Wilma reaffirms her love and vows her commitment to a grateful and emotional Homer, who finally embraces her.

Widely respected by the bank's senior management for his past business acumen, Al is admonished after approving an unsecured loan to a farmer and fellow veteran without collateral (never realizing the land the farmer wishes to purchase could be collateral for the loan). With inhibitions lowered by excessive drinking, Al gives a speech at a work banquet that satirizes requiring a veteran to provide collateral before risking his life to take a hill in battle.

With little work experience and unable to find a better job than soda jerk, Fred returns to the same drugstore and is now supervised by his former protege. Fred and Peggy's attraction grows stronger, increasing tensions with Al. When Homer visits Fred at the drugstore, another customer criticizes US involvement in the war, telling Homer his injuries were unnecessary. Homer responds angrily, and Fred punches the customer, for which he's fired. Marie, frustrated with Fred's lack of financial success and missing her past nightlife, seeks a divorce.

Bitter and seeing no future in Boone City, especially with Al telling him to stay away from Peggy, Fred decides to catch the next plane out. While waiting at the airport, Fred walks into an aircraft graveyard, climbing into the bombardier's seat of a decommissioned B-17 bomber. He's roused from a painful flashback by a work crew foreman, who tells him the planes are being demolished for use in the growing prefab housing industry. Fred asks if they need help in the budding business and is hired.

Al, Milly, and Peggy attend Homer and Wilma's wedding, where Fred is best man. Now divorced, Fred reunites with Peggy after the ceremony and expresses his love but says things may be financially difficult if she stays with him. Peggy's smile expresses her joy and she and Fred kiss.

== Cast ==
- Myrna Loy as Milly Stephenson
- Fredric March as Technical Sergeant Al Stephenson
- Dana Andrews as Captain Fred Derry
- Teresa Wright as Peggy Stephenson
- Virginia Mayo as Marie Derry
- Cathy O'Donnell as Wilma Cameron
- Hoagy Carmichael as Butch Engle, Homer's uncle
- Harold Russell as Petty Officer 2nd Class Homer Parrish
- Gladys George as Hortense Derry
- Roman Bohnen as Pat Derry
- Ray Collins as Mr. Milton
- Minna Gombell as Mrs. Parrish
- Walter Baldwin as Mr. Parrish
- Steve Cochran as Cliff
- Dorothy Adams as Mrs. Cameron
- Don Beddoe as Mr. Cameron
- Marlene Aames as Luella Parrish
- Charles Halton as Prew
- Ray Teal as Mr. Mollett
- Howland Chamberlain as Thorpe
- Dean White as Novak
- Erskine Sanford as Bullard
- Michael Hall as Rob Stephenson
- Victor Cutler as Woody Merrill
- Leo Penn as ATC Corporal (uncredited)

Casting brought together established stars as well as character actors and relative unknowns. Jazz drummer Gene Krupa was seen in archival footage, while Tennessee Ernie Ford, later a TV star, appeared as an uncredited "hillbilly singer" (in the first of his only three film appearances). (Note: At the time the film was shot, Ford was unknown as a singer. He worked in San Bernardino as a radio announcer-disc jockey.)

Blake Edwards, later a film producer and director, appeared fleetingly as an uncredited "Corporal". Wyler's daughters, Catherine and Judy, were cast as uncredited customers seen in the drug store where Fred Derry works. Sean Penn's father, Leo, played the uncredited part of the soldier working as a scheduling clerk in the Air Transport Command Office at the beginning of the film.

Teresa Wright was only 13 years younger than her on-screen mother, played by Myrna Loy.

Michael Hall (1926–2020), who played Rob Stephenson, was the last surviving credited cast member at the time of his death. However, he is only seen in the first third of the film. Hall's contract with Goldwyn ended during filming, but the producer was reluctant to pay extra money to rehire him.

== Production ==
Samuel Goldwyn was inspired to produce a film about veterans after reading an August 7, 1944, article in Time about the difficulties experienced by men returning to civilian life. Goldwyn hired former war correspondent MacKinlay Kantor to write a screenplay. His work was first published as a novella, Glory for Me, which Kantor wrote in blank verse. Robert E. Sherwood then adapted the novella as a screenplay.

Director Wyler had flown combat missions over Europe in filming Memphis Belle (1944), and worked hard to get accurate depictions of the combat veterans he had encountered. Wyler changed the original casting, which had featured a veteran suffering from post-traumatic stress disorder, and sought out Harold Russell, a non-actor, to take on the exacting role of Homer Parrish.

For The Best Years of Our Lives, he asked the principal actors to purchase their own clothes, in order to connect with daily life and produce an authentic feeling. Other Wyler touches included constructing life-size sets, which went against the standard larger sets that were more suited to camera positions. The impact for the audience was immediate, as each scene played out in a realistic, natural way.

Recounting the interrelated story of three veterans right after the end of World War II, The Best Years of Our Lives began filming just over seven months after the war's end, starting on April 15, 1946, at a variety of locations, including the Los Angeles County Arboretum and Botanic Garden, Ontario International Airport in Ontario, California, Raleigh Studios in Hollywood, and the Samuel Goldwyn/Warner Hollywood Studios.

In The Best Years of Our Lives cinematographer Gregg Toland used deep focus photography, in which objects both close to and distant from the camera are in sharp focus. For the passage of Fred Derry's reliving a combat mission while sitting in the remains of a former bomber, Wyler used "zoom" effects to simulate Derry's subjective state.

The fictional Boone City was patterned after Cincinnati, Ohio. The "Jackson High" football stadium seen early in aerial footage of the bomber flying over the Boone City is Corcoran Stadium located at Xavier University in Cincinnati. A few seconds later Walnut Hills High School with its dome and football field can be seen along with the downtown Cincinnati skyline (Carew Tower and Fourth and Vine Tower) in the background.

After the war, the combat aircraft featured in the film were being destroyed and disassembled for reuse as scrap material. The scene of Derry's walking among aircraft ruins was filmed at the Ontario Army Air Field in Ontario, California. The former training facility had been converted into a scrap yard, housing nearly 2,000 former combat aircraft in various states of disassembly and reclamation.

== Reception ==
=== Critical response ===
Upon its release, The Best Years of Our Lives received extremely positive reviews from critics. Shortly after its premiere at the Astor Theater, New York, Bosley Crowther, film critic for The New York Times, hailed the film as a masterpiece. He wrote,

It is seldom that there comes a motion picture which can be wholly and enthusiastically endorsed not only as superlative entertainment, but as food for quiet and humanizing thought... In working out their solutions, Mr. Sherwood and Mr. Wyler have achieved some of the most beautiful and inspiring demonstrations of human fortitude that we have had in films." He also said the ensemble casting gave the "'best' performance in this best film this year from Hollywood".

Director Wyler and cinematographer Toland used deep focus to keep Fred visible in the phone booth in the far background of the frame.

French film critic André Bazin used examples of Toland's and Wyler's deep-focus visual style to illuminate his theory of realism in film—going into detail about the scene in which Fred uses the phone booth in the far background while Homer and Butch play piano in the foreground. Bazin explains how deep focus functions in this scene:

The action in the foreground is secondary, although interesting and peculiar enough to require our keen attention since it occupies a privileged place and surface on the screen. Paradoxically, the true action, the one that constitutes at this precise moment a turning point in the story, develops almost clandestinely in a tiny rectangle at the back of the room—in the left corner of the screen.... Thus the viewer is induced actively to participate in the drama planned by the director.

Professor and author Gabriel Miller discusses briefly the use of deep-focus in both the bar scene and the wedding scene at the end of the picture in an article written for the National Film Preservation Board.

From The Nation in 1946, critic James Agee wrote, "In fact, it would be possible, I don't doubt, to call the whole picture just one long pious piece of deceit and self-deceit, embarrassed by hot flashes of talent, conscience, truthfulness, and dignity. And it is anyhow more than possible, it is unhappily obligatory, to observe that a good deal which might have been very fine, even great, and which is handled mainly by people who could have done, and done perfectly, all the best that could have been developed out of the idea, is here either murdered in its cradle or reduced to manageable good citizenship in the early stages of grade school. Yet I feel a hundred times more liking and admiration for the film than distaste or disappointment."

Several decades later, film critic David Thomson offered tempered praise: "I would concede that Best Years is decent and humane... acutely observed, despite being so meticulous a package. It would have taken uncommon genius and daring at that time to sneak a view of an untidy or unresolved America past Goldwyn or the public." Pauline Kael wrote, "Despite its seven Academy Awards, it's not a great picture; it's too schematic and it drags on after you get the points. However, episodes and details stand out and help to compensate for the soggy plot strands and there's something absorbing about the banality of its large-scale good intentions; it's compulsively watchable."

The Best Years of Our Lives has a 97% "Fresh" rating at Rotten Tomatoes, based on 105 reviews. The critical consensus states: "An engrossing look at the triumphs and travails of war veterans, The Best Years of Our Lives is concerned specifically with the aftermath of World War II, but its messages speak to the overall American experience." On Metacritic, the film holds a weighted average score of 93 out of 100 based on 17 critics, indicating "universal acclaim".

Chicago Sun-Times film critic Roger Ebert put the film on his "Great Movies" list in 2007, calling it "modern, lean, and honest".

=== Popular response ===
The Best Years of Our Lives was a massive commercial success. It opened to the public at the Astor Theatre in New York City on November 22, 1946, and grossed $52,236 in its first week. Its length restricted the film to six shows a day, cutting down on total ticket sales, and initially suffered by having a top midweek ticket price of $2.40, ($37.75 today) reducing gross revenue. It opened at the Woods Theatre in Chicago on December 18 before a roadshow theatrical release in Boston and Los Angeles, starting on the evening of Christmas Day. After 12 weeks at the Astor, the film had grossed $584,000 and at that point had grossed $1.37 million from six theatres in five cities from 45 play weeks.

The picture earned $7.65 million in theatrical rentals at the U.S. and Canadian box office during its initial theatrical run, ultimately benefiting from much larger admission prices (reflecting its exceptional length) than the majority of films released that year, which accounted for almost 70% of its earnings. When box office figures are adjusted for inflation, it remains one of the top 100 grossing films in U.S. history.

Among films released before 1950, only Gone With the Wind, The Bells of St. Mary's, The Big Parade and four Disney titles have done more total business, in part due to later re-releases. (Reliable box office figures for certain early films such as The Birth of a Nation and Charlie Chaplin's comedies are unavailable.)

However, because of the distribution arrangement RKO had with Goldwyn, RKO recorded a loss of $660,000 on the film.

== Awards and honors ==
In spite of his role, Harold Russell was not a professional actor. As the Academy Board of Governors considered him a long shot to win the Best Supporting Actor Oscar he had been nominated for, they gave him an Academy Honorary Award "for bringing hope and courage to his fellow veterans through his appearance". When Russell in fact won as supporting actor, there was an enthusiastic response. He is the only actor to have received two Academy Awards for the same performance. In 1992, Russell sold his Best Supporting Actor statuette at auction for $60,500 ($138,800 today), to pay his wife's medical bills.

Award	Category	Nominee(s)	Result	Ref.
Academy Awards	Best Motion Picture	Samuel Goldwyn Productions	Won	
Academy Awards	Best Director	William Wyler	Won	
Academy Awards	Best Actor	Fredric March	Won	
Academy Awards	Best Supporting Actor	Harold Russell	Won	
Academy Awards	Best Screenplay	Robert E. Sherwood	Won	
Academy Awards	Best Film Editing	Daniel Mandell	Won	
Academy Awards	Best Scoring of a Dramatic or Comedy Picture	Hugo Friedhofer	Won	
Academy Awards	Best Sound Recording	Gordon E. Sawyer	Nominated	
Academy Awards	Academy Honorary Award	Harold Russell	Won	
Academy Awards	Irving G. Thalberg Memorial Award	Samuel Goldwyn	Won	
Bodil Awards	Best American Film	William Wyler	Won	
British Academy Film Awards	Best Film from any Source		Won	
Brussels World Film Festival	Best Actress	Myrna Loy	Won	
Cinema Writers Circle Awards	Best Foreign Film		Won	
Golden Globe Awards	Best Picture		Won	
Golden Globe Awards	Special Achievement Award	Harold Russell	Won	
Karlovy Vary International Film Festival	Crystal Globe	William Wyler	Nominated	
Karlovy Vary International Film Festival	Best Director	William Wyler	Won	
Karlovy Vary International Film Festival	Best Screenplay	Robert E. Sherwood	Won	
National Board of Review Awards	Top Ten Films		3rd Place	
National Board of Review Awards	Best Director	William Wyler	Won	
National Film Preservation Board	National Film Registry		Inducted	
New York Film Critics Circle Awards	Best Film		Won	
New York Film Critics Circle Awards	Best Director	William Wyler	Won	
New York Film Critics Circle Awards	Best Actor	Fredric March	Nominated	
Online Film & Television Association Awards	Film Hall of Fame: Productions		Won	

=== American Film Institute ===
- AFI's 100 Years...100 Movies: #37
- AFI's 100 Years...100 Cheers: #11
- AFI's 100 Years...100 Movies (10th Anniversary Edition): #37

In 2006, Writers Guild of America West ranked its screenplay 44th in WGA's list of 101 Greatest Screenplays.

== Radio adaptations ==
The picture received four half-hour radio adaptations during 1947 and 1949: on Hedda Hopper's This Is Hollywood, The Screen Guild Theater (two) and Screen Directors Playhouse. In each case various actors reprised their film roles.
