= Anne Baxter =

American actress (1923–1985)

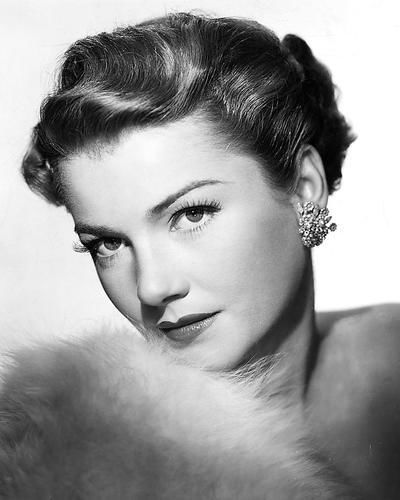
- Baxter in You're My Everything (1949)
- Born: May 7, 1923; Michigan City, Indiana, U.S.
- Died: December 12, 1985 (aged 62); New York City, U.S.
- Resting place: Lloyd Jones Cemetery, Spring Green, Wisconsin
- Occupation: Actress
- Years active: 1936–1985
- Known for: The Razor's Edge; All About Eve; The Ten Commandments; Batman
- Political party: Republican
- Spouses: John Hodiak (m. 1946; div. 1953) Randolph Galt (m. 1960; div. 1969) David Klee (m. 1977; died 1977)
- Children: 3
- Relatives: Frank Lloyd Wright (grandfather); Lloyd Wright (uncle); John Lloyd Wright (uncle); Eric Lloyd Wright (cousin); Elizabeth Wright Ingraham (cousin)
- Awards: Academy Award for Best Supporting Actress (1947); Golden Globe Award for Best Supporting Actress (1947); Laurel Award for Topliner Female Dramatic Performance (1951, 1957)

Anne Baxter (May 7, 1923 – December 12, 1985) was an American actress, star of Hollywood films, Broadway productions, and television series. She won an Academy Award, a Golden Globe, and seven Photoplay Awards, and was nominated for an Emmy and two Laurel Awards.

A granddaughter of Frank Lloyd Wright, Baxter studied acting with Maria Ouspenskaya and had some stage experience before making her film debut in 20 Mule Team (1940). She became a contract player of 20th Century-Fox and was loaned to RKO Pictures for the role of Lucy Morgan in Orson Welles's The Magnificent Ambersons (1942). She was the leading lady in Billy Wilder's Five Graves to Cairo (1943). In 1947, she won both the Academy Award and the Golden Globe Award for Best Supporting Actress for her role as Sophie MacDonald in The Razor's Edge (1946).

Baxter played the title role in Joseph L. Mankiewicz's All About Eve (1950), for which she received an Academy Award nomination for Best Actress and won her first Laurel Award for Topliner Female Dramatic Performance. She worked with several of Hollywood's greatest directors, including Alfred Hitchcock in I Confess (1953), Fritz Lang in The Blue Gardenia (1953), and Cecil B. DeMille in The Ten Commandments (1956), for which she won her second Laurel Award for Topliner Female Dramatic Performance.

== Early life ==
Baxter was born May 7, 1923, in Michigan City, Indiana, to Catherine Dorothy Baxter (née Wright; 1894–1979), whose father was the architect and designer Frank Lloyd Wright, and Kenneth Stuart Baxter (1893–1977), an executive with the Seagram Company.

When Baxter was five, she appeared in a school play. When she was six, her family moved to New York, where she continued to act. She was raised in Westchester County, New York and attended The Brearley School.

At age 10, Baxter attended a Broadway play starring Helen Hayes where she was so impressed she declared to her family she wanted to become an actress. By age 13, she had appeared on Broadway in Seen but Not Heard. During this period, Baxter learned her acting craft as a student of actress and teacher Maria Ouspenskaya.

In 1939, she was cast as Katharine Hepburn's younger sister in the play The Philadelphia Story, Hepburn did not like Baxter's acting style so Baxter was replaced during the show's pre-Broadway run. Rather than giving up, she turned to Hollywood.

== Career ==
=== 20th Century Fox ===
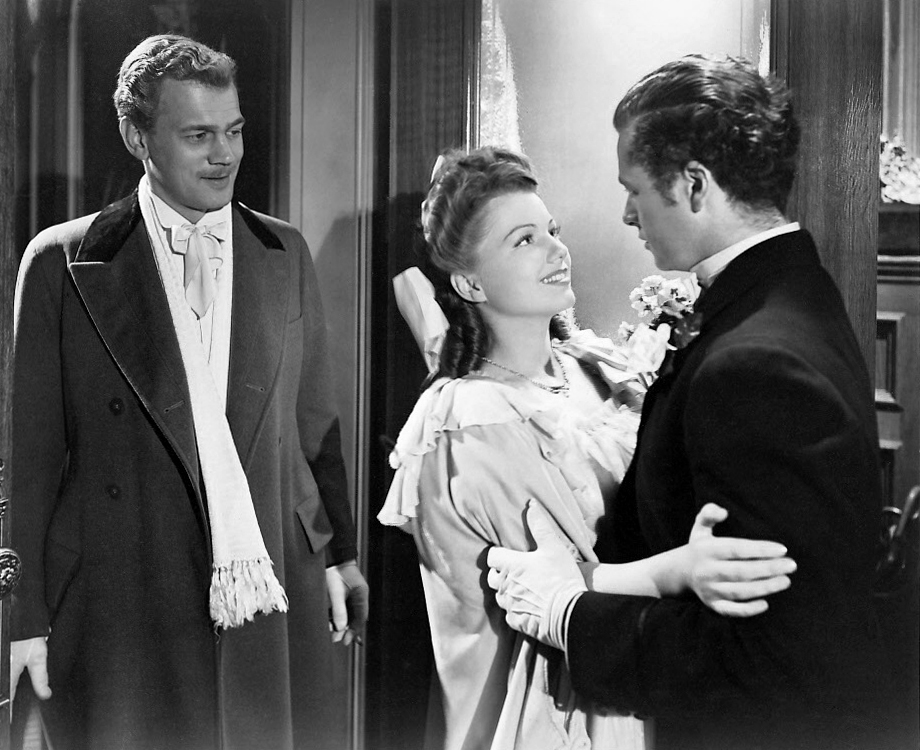
Joseph Cotten, Baxter and Tim Holt in The Magnificent Ambersons (1942)

At 16, Baxter screen-tested for the role of Mrs. DeWinter in Rebecca. Director Alfred Hitchcock deemed Baxter too young for the role, but the screen test brought her offers from MGM and 20th Century Fox. She chose to sign a contract with Fox because of their higher salary. In 1940, she was loaned to MGM for her first film 20 Mule Team, in which she was billed fourth after Wallace Beery, Leo Carrillo, and Marjorie Rambeau. She worked with John Barrymore in her next film The Great Profile (1940) and appeared as the ingénue in the Jack Benny vehicle Charley's Aunt (1941). She received star billing in Swamp Water (1941) and The Pied Piper (1942), which was nominated for the Academy Award for Best Picture.

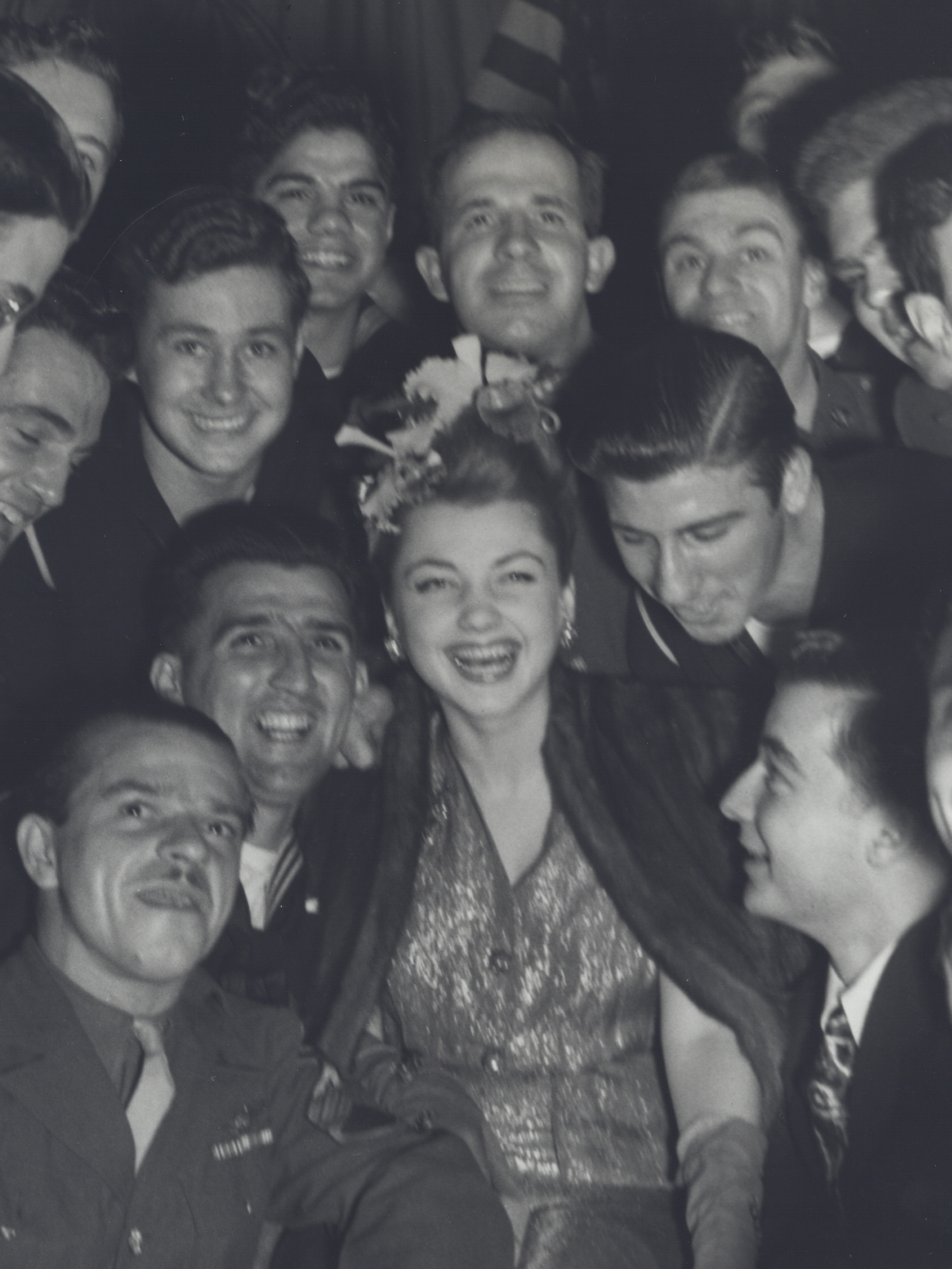
Anne Baxter in 1943 with United States Army soldiers

Baxter was loaned to RKO to appear in director Orson Welles's The Magnificent Ambersons (1942). She was Tyrone Power's leading lady in Crash Dive (1943), her first Technicolor film. In 1943, she played a French maid in a North African hotel (with a French accent) in Billy Wilder's Five Graves to Cairo, a Paramount production. She became a popular star in World War II dramas and received top billing in The North Star (1943), The Sullivans (1944), The Eve of St. Mark (1944), and Sunday Dinner for a Soldier (1944), co-starring her future husband John Hodiak. Baxter later recalled, "I was getting almost as much mail as Betty Grable. I was our boys' idealized girl next door."

She was loaned to United Artists for the leading role in the film noir Guest in the House (1944), and appeared in A Royal Scandal (1945), with Tallulah Bankhead and Charles Coburn; Smoky (1946), with Fred MacMurray; and Angel on My Shoulder (1946), with Paul Muni and Claude Rains.

Baxter co-starred with Tyrone Power and Gene Tierney in 1946's The Razor's Edge, for which she won both the Academy Award and the Golden Globe Award for Best Supporting Actress. Baxter later recounted that The Razor's Edge contained her only great performance, a hospital scene where the character Sophie "loses her husband, child and everything else." She said she relived the death of her brother, who had died at age three.

She was loaned to Paramount for a top-billed role opposite William Holden in Blaze of Noon (1947) and to MGM for a supporting role as Clark Gable's wife in Homecoming (1948). Back at 20th Century Fox, she played a wide variety of roles: a lawyer in love with Cornel Wilde in The Walls of Jericho (1948); Tyrone Power's Irish romantic interest in The Luck of the Irish (1948); a tomboy in Yellow Sky (1948), with Gregory Peck and Richard Widmark; a 1920s flapper in You're My Everything (1949), with Dan Dailey; and another tomboy in A Ticket to Tomahawk (1950), again with Dailey.

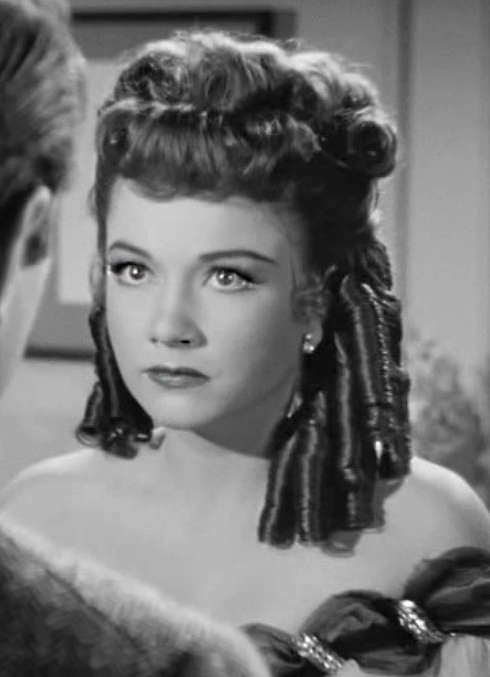
Baxter as Eve Harrington in All About Eve (1950), for which she was nominated for the Academy Award for Best Actress and won her first Laurel Award for Topliner Female Dramatic Performance

In 1950, Baxter was chosen to co-star in All About Eve largely because of a resemblance to Claudette Colbert, who originally was cast, with the idea to have Baxter's character gradually come to mirror Colbert's over the course of the film. However, Colbert dropped out and was replaced by Bette Davis and the idea was dropped. Baxter received an Academy Award nomination for Best Actress for the title role of Eve Harrington, but lost to Judy Holliday in Born Yesterday. She said she modeled the role on a bitchy understudy she had for her debut performance in the Broadway play Seen but Not Heard at the age of 13 and who had threatened to "finish her off."

Her next Fox film Follow the Sun (1951) co-starred Glenn Ford as champion golfer Ben Hogan; Baxter played Hogan's wife Valerie. She was top-billed in the western The Outcasts of Poker Flat (1950), with Dale Robertson. Her final acting assignments at Fox were My Wife's Best Friend, with MacDonald Carey, and a segment in O. Henry's Full House (1952), which featured an ensemble cast.

=== Freelance ===
In 1953, Baxter contracted a two-picture deal for Warner Brothers. Her first was opposite Montgomery Clift in Alfred Hitchcock's I Confess; the second was the Fritz Lang whodunit The Blue Gardenia, in which she played a woman accused of murder.

She traveled to Germany to star in a drama film titled Carnival Story (1954). For MGM, she went to France to play the leading role in the crime drama Bedevilled (1955). At Universal-International, she made two films set in the Old West: One Desire (1955), with Rock Hudson and Julie Adams, and The Spoilers (1955), with Jeff Chandler and Rory Calhoun. Baxter was directed by her publicist and boyfriend, Russell Birdwell, in the independent film noir The Come On (1956), co-starring Sterling Hayden as her leading man.

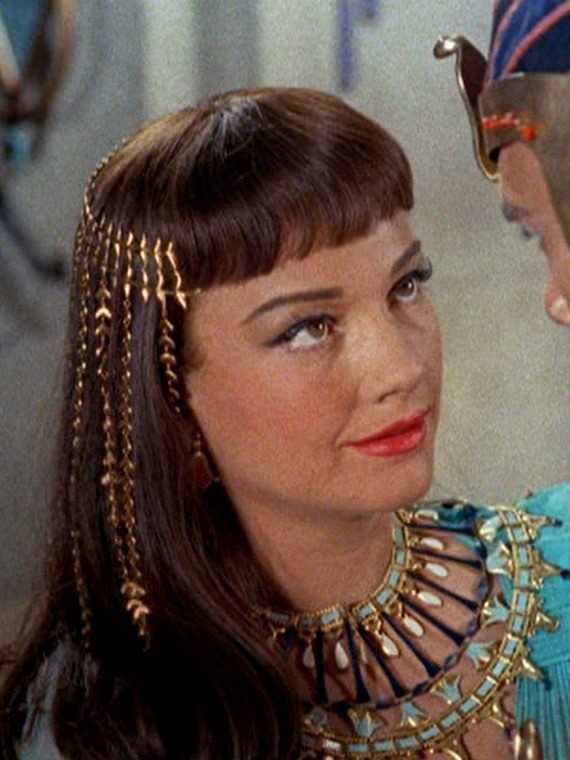
Baxter as Nefretiri in The Ten Commandments (1956), for which she won her second Laurel Award for Topliner Female Dramatic Performance

Baxter won the part of the Egyptian princess and queen Nefertari (spelled Nefretiri in the film) in Cecil B. DeMille's award-winning biblical epic The Ten Commandments (1956). Her co-stars included Charlton Heston as Moses and Yul Brynner as Rameses. Her scenes were shot on Paramount's sound stages in 1955, and she attended the film's New York and Los Angeles premieres in November 1956. Despite criticisms of her interpretation of Nefertari, DeMille and The Hollywood Reporter both thought her performance was "very good", and The New York Daily News described her as "remarkably effective". For her work in The Ten Commandments, she won a Laurel Award for Topliner Female Dramatic Performance. She later remembered the film in an interview:

DeMille asked me to come in. His office at Paramount was bursting with books, props, rolls of linens. I told him I'd have to wear an Egyptian false nose and he pounded the table. "No. Baxter, your Irish nose stays in this picture." He acted out my part and I kept nodding, and I walked out with the part. The sound stage sets were magnificent. It was all corny, sure, but DeMille knew it was corny—that's what he wanted, what he loved. I loved slinking around—really, this was silent film acting but with dialogue.

She was reteamed with Heston in Paramount's Three Violent People (1956), co-starring Gilbert Roland and Tom Tryon. In the British mystery film Chase a Crooked Shadow (1958), she shared star billing with Richard Todd and Herbert Lom. She travelled to Australia to make Summer of the Seventeenth Doll playing a part originally intended for Rita Hayworth.

In 1960, Baxter received a motion pictures star on the Hollywood Walk of Fame at 6741 Hollywood Boulevard. She played the role of Dixie Lee in the 1960 film adaptation of Edna Ferber's 1930 novel Cimarron.

=== Later career ===
Baxter worked regularly in television in the 1960s. She appeared as one of the mystery guests on What's My Line? She also starred as guest villain Zelda The Great in episodes 9 and 10 of the Batman series. She appeared as another villain, Olga, Queen of the Cossacks, opposite Vincent Price's Egghead in three episodes of the show's third season. She played an old flame of Raymond Burr on his crime series Ironside. Baxter made a guest appearance on My Three Sons season 8 episode 10, aired on November 4, 1967, called "Designing Woman", portraying a glamorous female engineer who wanted Steve Douglas (Fred MacMurray) as a love interest and possible future husband.

Baxter returned to Broadway during the 1970s in Applause, the musical version of All About Eve, but this time as Margo Channing (succeeding Lauren Bacall).

In the 1970s, Baxter was a frequent guest and guest host on The Mike Douglas Show. She portrayed a murderous film star on an episode of Columbo, titled "Requiem for a Falling Star". In 1971, she had a role in Fools' Parade as an aging prostitute. In 1983, Baxter starred in the television series Hotel, replacing her All About Eve costar Bette Davis after the latter became ill.

== Personal life ==
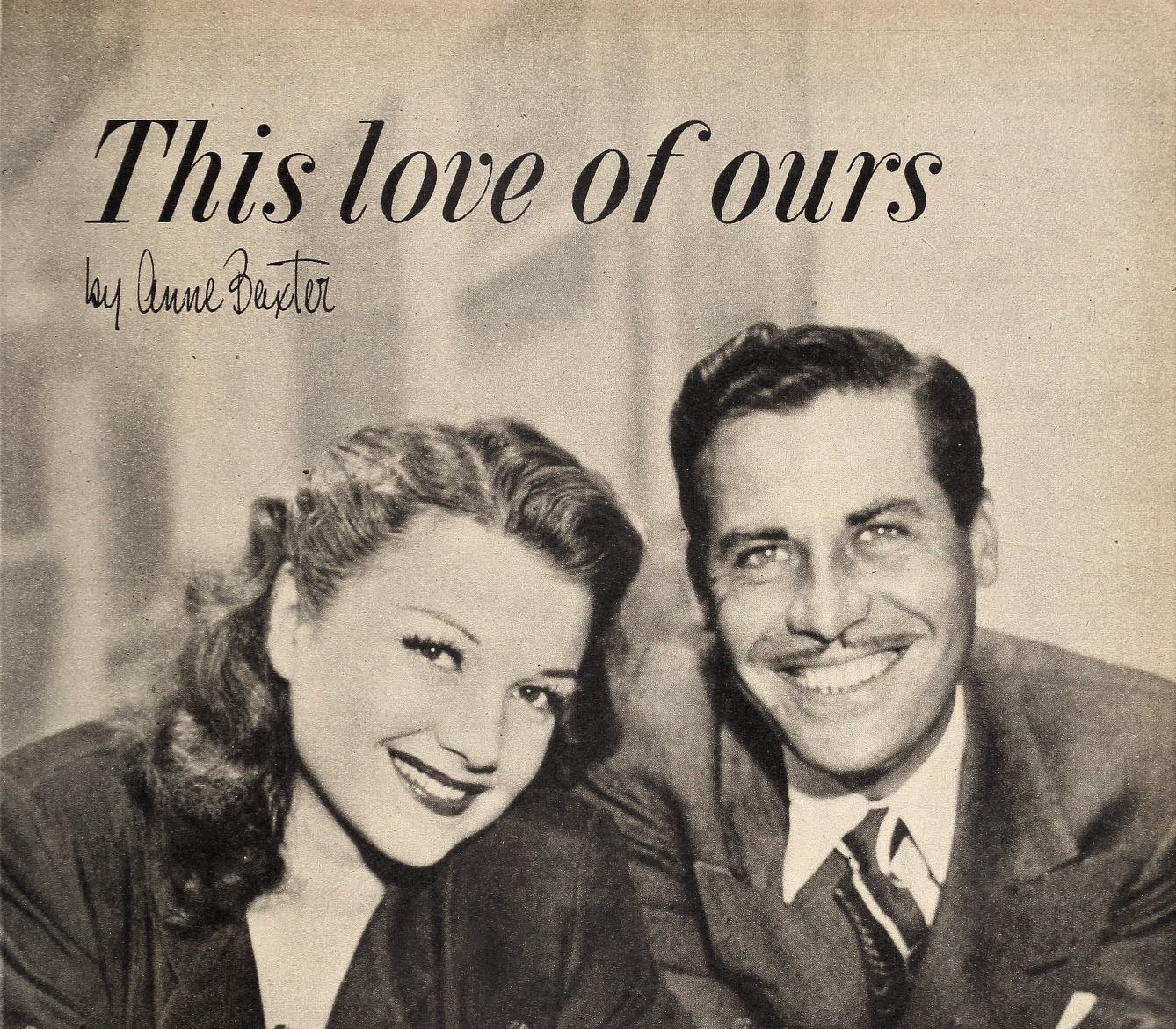
Baxter with her first husband, actor John Hodiak, in 1950

Baxter married actor John Hodiak on July 7, 1946, at her parents' home in Burlingame, California. The couple had one daughter, Katrina, born in 1951. They divorced in 1953. At the time, she said they were "basically incompatible", but in her book she blamed herself for the separation:

I had loved John as much. But we'd eventually congealed in the longest winter in the world. Daily estrangement. Things unsaid. Even a fight would have warmed us. To my shame, I'd picked one at last in order to unfreeze the word "divorce".

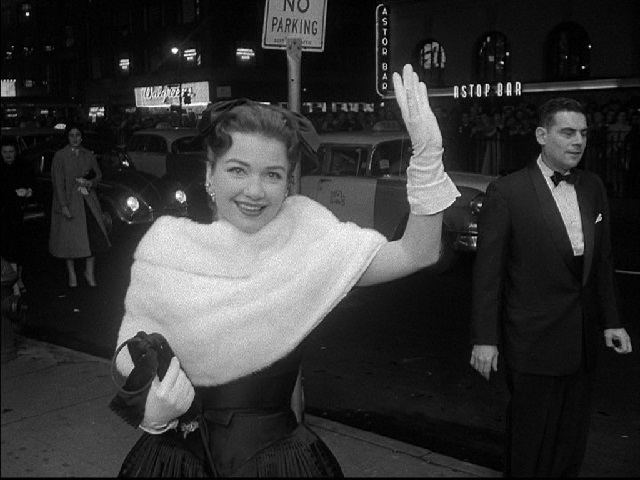
Baxter at the New York premiere of The Ten Commandments (1956)

In the mid-1950s, Baxter began a relationship with her publicist Russell Birdwell, who took control of her career and directed her in The Come On (1956). The couple formed Baxter-Birdwell Productions to make films on a 10-year plan; Baxter would star in the films and Birdwell would work behind the camera. Princeton University Library has a collection of 175 letters by Baxter to Birdwell.

In 1960, Baxter married a second time to Randolph Galt, an American owner of a cattle station at Gloucester, New South Wales where she was filming Summer of the Seventeenth Doll. After the birth of their second daughter, Maginel, back in California, Galt unexpectedly announced that they were moving to a 4,452 hectares (11,000 acres) ranch south of Grants, New Mexico. They then moved to Hawaii, his home state, before settling back in the Brentwood neighborhood of Los Angeles. Baxter and Galt were divorced in 1969. In 1976, Baxter recounted her courtship with Galt (whom she called "Ran") in a well-received book called Intermission. Melissa Galt, Baxter's first daughter with Galt, became an interior designer and then a business coach, speaker, and seminar provider. Maginel became a cloistered Catholic nun, reportedly living in Rome. After 11 years in Italy and 20 years living monastic life, Maginel left religion altogether.

In 1977, Baxter married David Klee, a stockbroker. It was a brief marriage; Klee died unexpectedly from illness. The newlywed couple had purchased a sprawling property in Easton, Connecticut, which they extensively remodeled; however, Klee did not live to see the renovations completed. Although she maintained a residence in West Hollywood, Baxter considered her Connecticut home to be her primary residence.

Baxter was a Republican who was active in the campaigns of Thomas E. Dewey and Dwight D. Eisenhower.

== Death ==
Baxter had a stroke on December 4, 1985, while hailing a taxi on Madison Avenue in New York City. She remained on life support for eight days in New York's Lenox Hill Hospital, until family members agreed that brain function had ceased, and she died on December 12, at the age of 62.

== Radio appearances ==
Year	Program	Episode/source
1945	Old Gold Comedy Theatre	Nothing but the Truth
1948	Lux Radio Theatre	The Luck of the Irish
1951	Lux Radio Theater	All About Eve
1952	Suspense (radio drama)	The Death of Barbara Allen
1953	Theatre Guild on the Air	Trial by Forgery
1953	The Martin and Lewis Show	Episode #100 (May 5)

== Awards and nominations ==
Year	Award	Category	Nominated work	Result	Ref.
1946	Academy Awards	Best Supporting Actress	The Razor's Edge	Won	
1950	Academy Awards	Best Actress	All About Eve	Nominated	
1946	Golden Globe Awards	Best Supporting Actress – Motion Picture	The Razor's Edge	Won	
1950	Laurel Awards	Top Female Dramatic Performance	All About Eve	2nd Place	
1956	Laurel Awards	Top Female Dramatic Performance	The Ten Commandments	5th Place	
1969	Primetime Emmy Awards	Outstanding Single Performance by an Actress in a Leading Role	The Name of the Game (Episode: "The Bobby Currier Story")	Nominated	

== See also ==
- List of actors with Academy Award nominations

== Bibliography ==
- Bawden, James; Miller, Ron (2016). "Anne Baxter". Conversations with Classic Film Stars. University Press of Kentucky. ISBN 9780813167121.
