= Academy Award for Best Original Screenplay =

Best screenplay not based upon previously published material

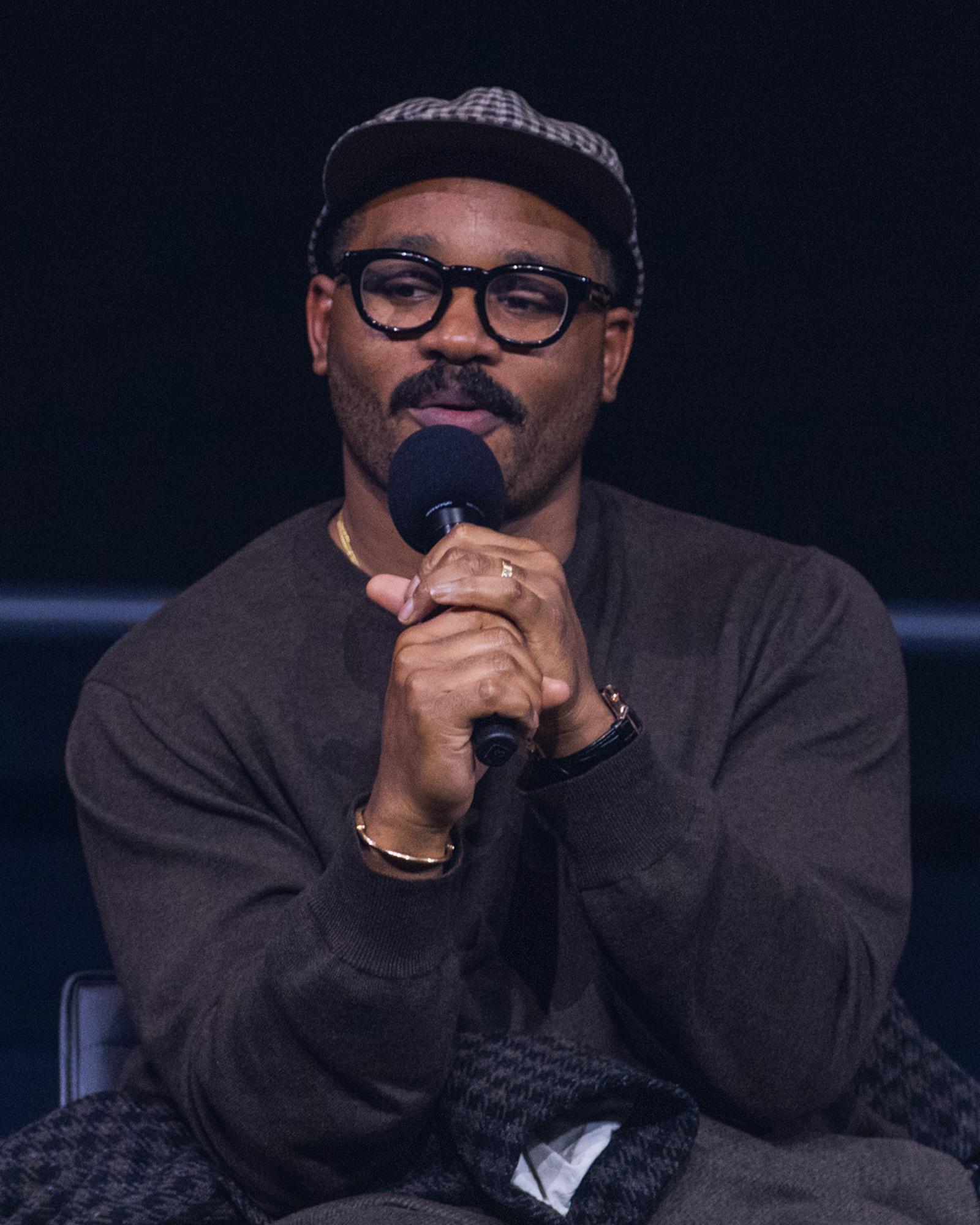
- The 2026 recipient: Ryan Coogler
- Presented by: Academy of Motion Picture Arts and Sciences (AMPAS)
- First award: February 27, 1941; 85 years ago (for films released in 1940)
- Most recent winner: Ryan Coogler; Sinners (2025)
- Website: oscars.org

The Academy Award for Best Original Screenplay is the Academy Award (also known as an Oscar) for the best screenplay not based upon previously published material; writers with "written by", "screenplay" or "story" credits are all collectively recognized as recipients for each nomination.

The category was created in 1940, and has always existed concurrently with the Best Adapted Screenplay category (conversely for films based on pre-existing intellectual properties); originally, it also co-existed with a third writing category, Best Story, which had been active since the original Academy Awards ceremony in 1929; this latter award was meant to reward specifically writers who originated a film's plot and characters rather than those who wrote the dialogue and final screenplay, although Best Story would later be merged into Best Original Screenplay in 1956.

== Eligibility ==
Screenplays are eligible if they are not based on "previously published material". The Writer's Branch of the academy determines if a screenplay is adapted or original, based on possible sources in question, interviews given about the film and the film's publicity materials, and sometimes places screenplays in a different category than the Writers Guild of America. For the 75th Academy Awards, Gangs of New York was nominated as an original screenplay despite being based on the book The Gangs of New York because the writers based the film on the book's historical research but largely invented the characters and plot. For the 89th Academy Awards, Moonlight was campaigned as an original screenplay, being based on an unpublished play, but was ultimately placed in the adapted screenplay category, which it won. Similarly, Whiplash was considered an adapted screenplay at the 87th Academy Awards despite being written as an original screenplay because a scene from the script was produced as a proof-of-concept short film. However, 2008's Frozen River, which similarly had a proof-of-concept short film screened at film festivals, was nominated as an original screenplay. Another similar case was with Barbie in 2023, which was nominated for Best Adapted Screenplay at the 96th Academy Awards despite campaigning for Best Original Screenplay during the awards season. This was because its use of existing characters (like Barbie and Ken) and its partial setting (Barbieland) were considered controversial.

== Superlatives ==
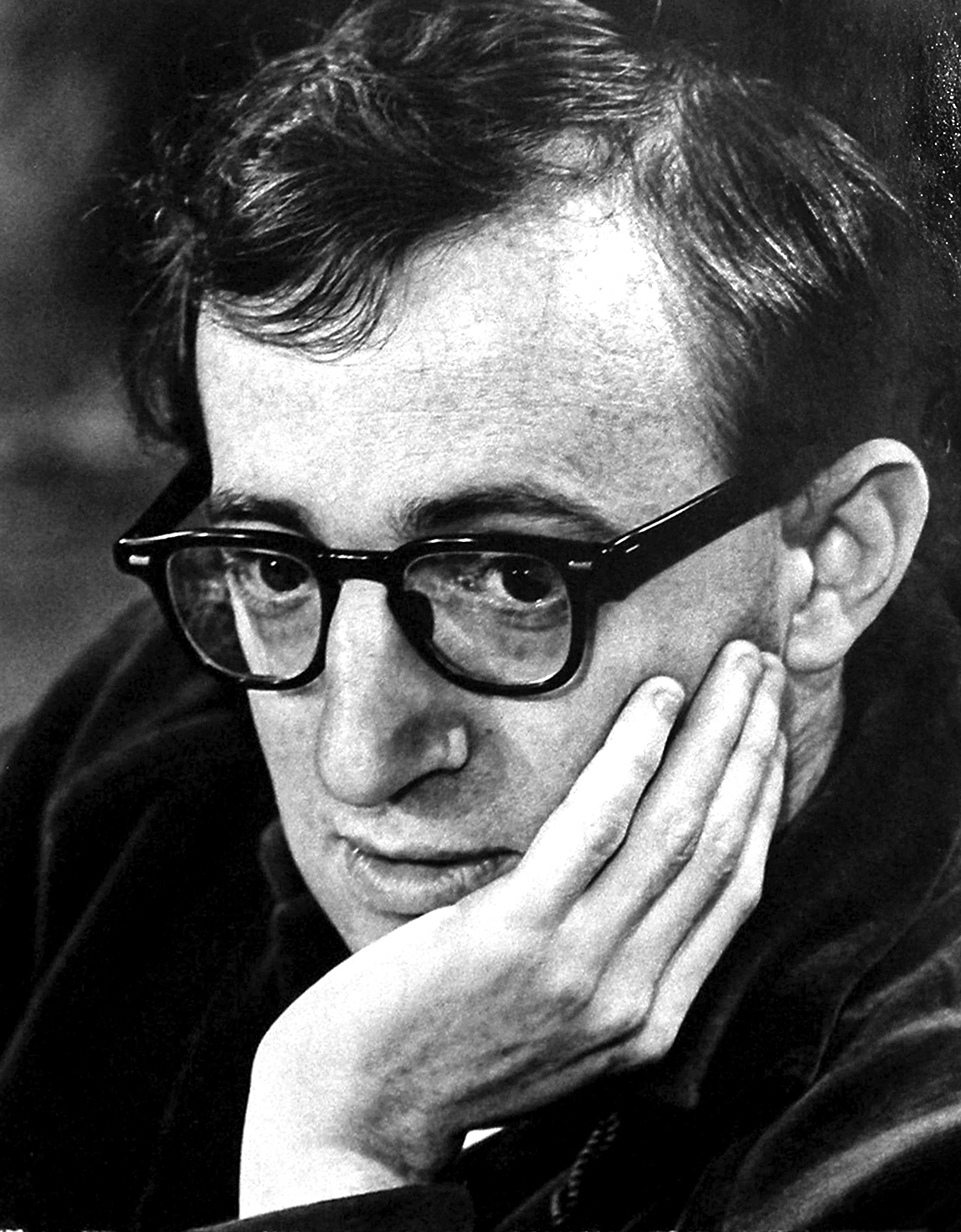
Woody Allen has received the most Oscar nominations in this category with 16, winning three times: for Annie Hall, Hannah and Her Sisters and Midnight in Paris

Woody Allen has the most nominations in this category with 16, and the most awards with 3 (for Annie Hall (1977), Hannah and Her Sisters (1986), and Midnight in Paris (2011)). Paddy Chayefsky and Billy Wilder have also won three screenwriting Oscars: Chayefsky won two for Original Screenplay (The Hospital and Network) and one for Adapted Screenplay (Marty), while Wilder won one for Adapted Screenplay (The Lost Weekend, shared with Charles Brackett), and two for Original Screenplay (Sunset Boulevard, shared with Brackett and D. M. Marshman Jr., and The Apartment, shared with I. A. L. Diamond)

Woody Allen also holds the record as the oldest winner (76) for Midnight in Paris. Ben Affleck is the youngest winner (25) for Good Will Hunting, co-written with Matt Damon (27).

Richard Schweizer was the first to win the award for a foreign-language film, Marie-Louise (French). Other winners for a non-English screenplay include Albert Lamorisse (The Red Balloon; French), Pietro Germi (Divorce Italian Style; Italian), Claude Lelouch (A Man and A Woman; French), Pedro Almodóvar (Talk to Her; Spanish), Bong Joon-ho and Han Jin-won (Parasite, Korean), and Justine Triet and Arthur Harari (Anatomy of a Fall, French). Lamorisse is the only person to win or even be nominated for Best Original Screenplay for a short film.

Frances Marion (The Big House) was the first woman to win for her original script, although she won Best Writing, which then included both original and adapted screenplays before a separate award for Best Original Screenplay was introduced. Muriel Box (The Seventh Veil) was the first woman to win in this category; she shared the award with her husband, Sydney Box. They are also the first of two married couples to win in this category; Earl W. Wallace and Pamela Wallace (Witness) are the others.

In 1996, Joel Coen and Ethan Coen became the only siblings to win in this category (for Fargo). Francis Ford Coppola (Patton, 1970) and Sofia Coppola (Lost in Translation, 2003) are the only father-daughter pair to win. Kenny and Keith Lucas are the only African-American siblings to receive a nomination in this category (Judas and the Black Messiah, 2020/21).

Frank Butler was nominated for two different films in the same year, both with a co-writer (1942): Road to Morocco, with Don Hartman, and Wake Island, with W.R. Burnett. Preston Sturges was nominated solo for two different films in the same year (1944): Hail the Conquering Hero and The Miracle of Morgan's Creek. Oliver Stone achieved the same distinction in 1986, for Platoon and Salvador. Maurice Richlin and Stanley Shapiro were nominated in 1959 for both Operation Petticoat and Pillow Talk and won for the latter.

Jordan Peele became the first African-American to win in this category for 2017's Get Out.

Bong Joon-ho and Han Jin-won became the first Asian writers to win either Screenplay award, for 2019's Parasite. This was also the most recent of 10 occasions when Oscars in this category have been awarded to writers for both screenplay AND story on one film (sometimes they have been completely different, and sometimes the credited screenplay author also contributed to the story alongside at least one other credited scribe).

== Winners and nominees ==
Winners are listed first in the colored row, followed by the other nominees.

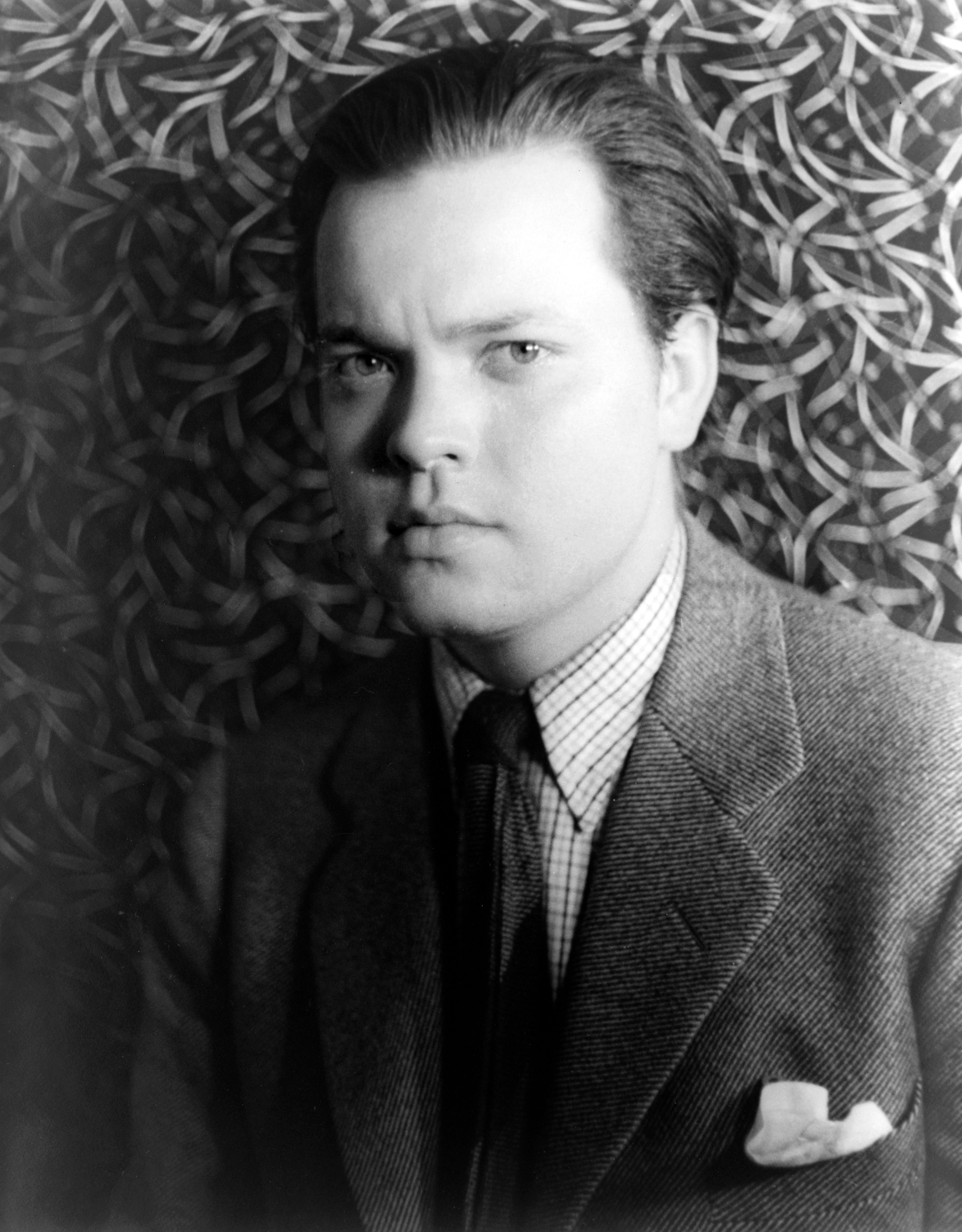
Orson Welles co-won the award for Citizen Kane in 1942.

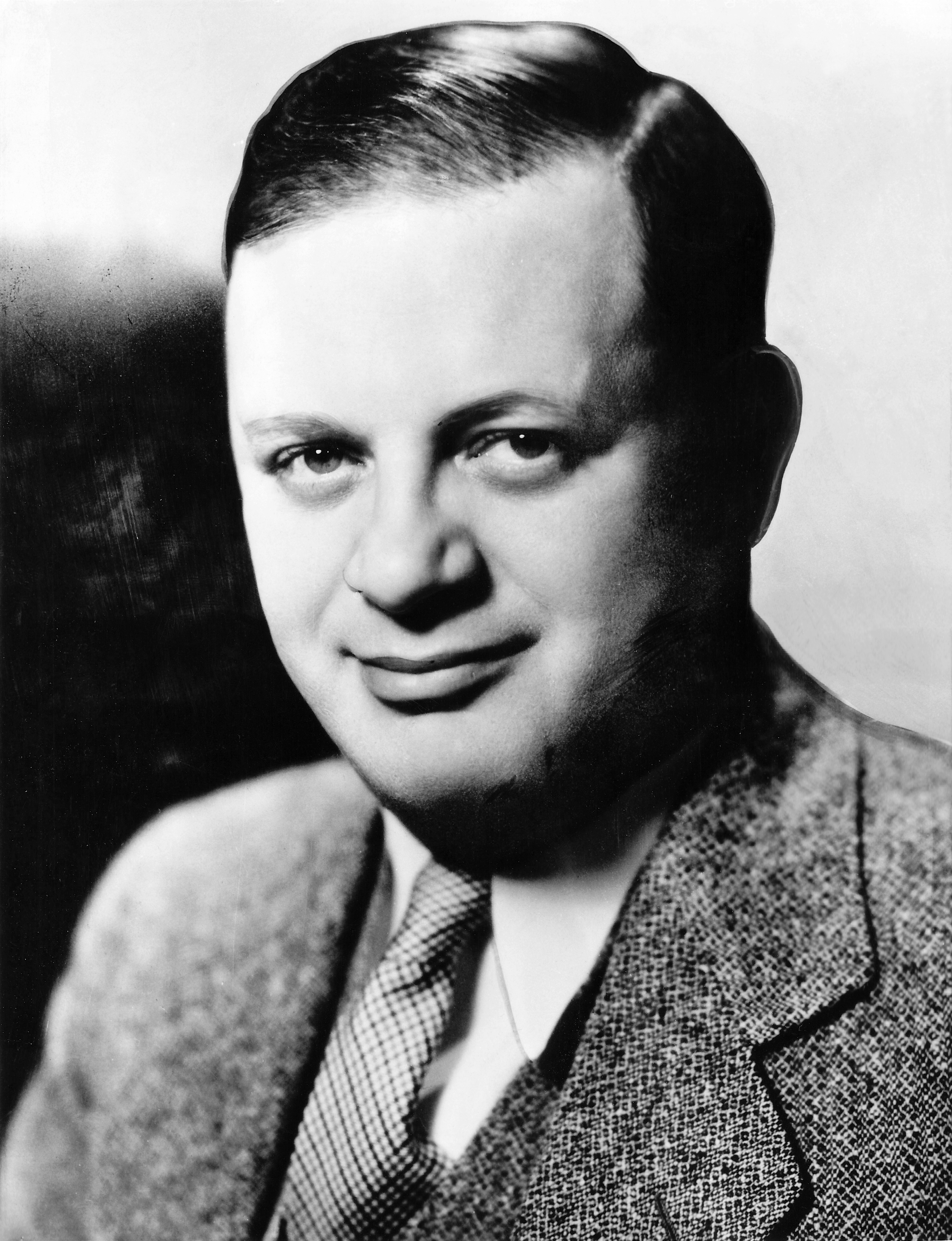
Herman J. Mankiewicz won for Citizen Kane (1941) alongside Orson Welles.

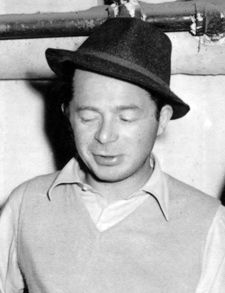
Billy Wilder won twice for Sunset Boulevard (1950) and The Apartment (1960). (Note: Wilde, a director and screenwriter, won each time with co-writers a decade apart)

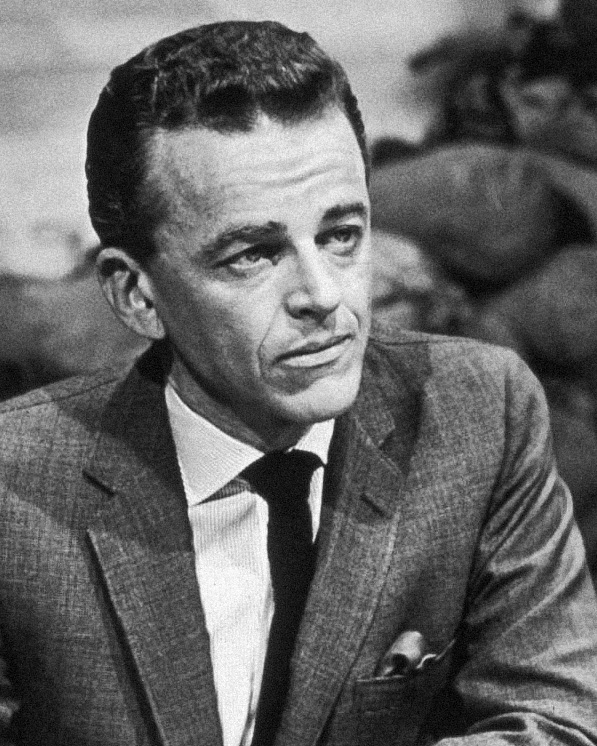
Alan Jay Lerner won for An American in Paris (1951)

Budd Schulberg won for On the Waterfront (1954)

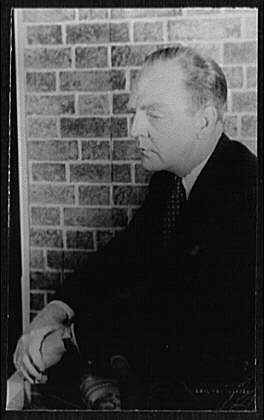
William Inge won for Splendor in the Grass (1961).

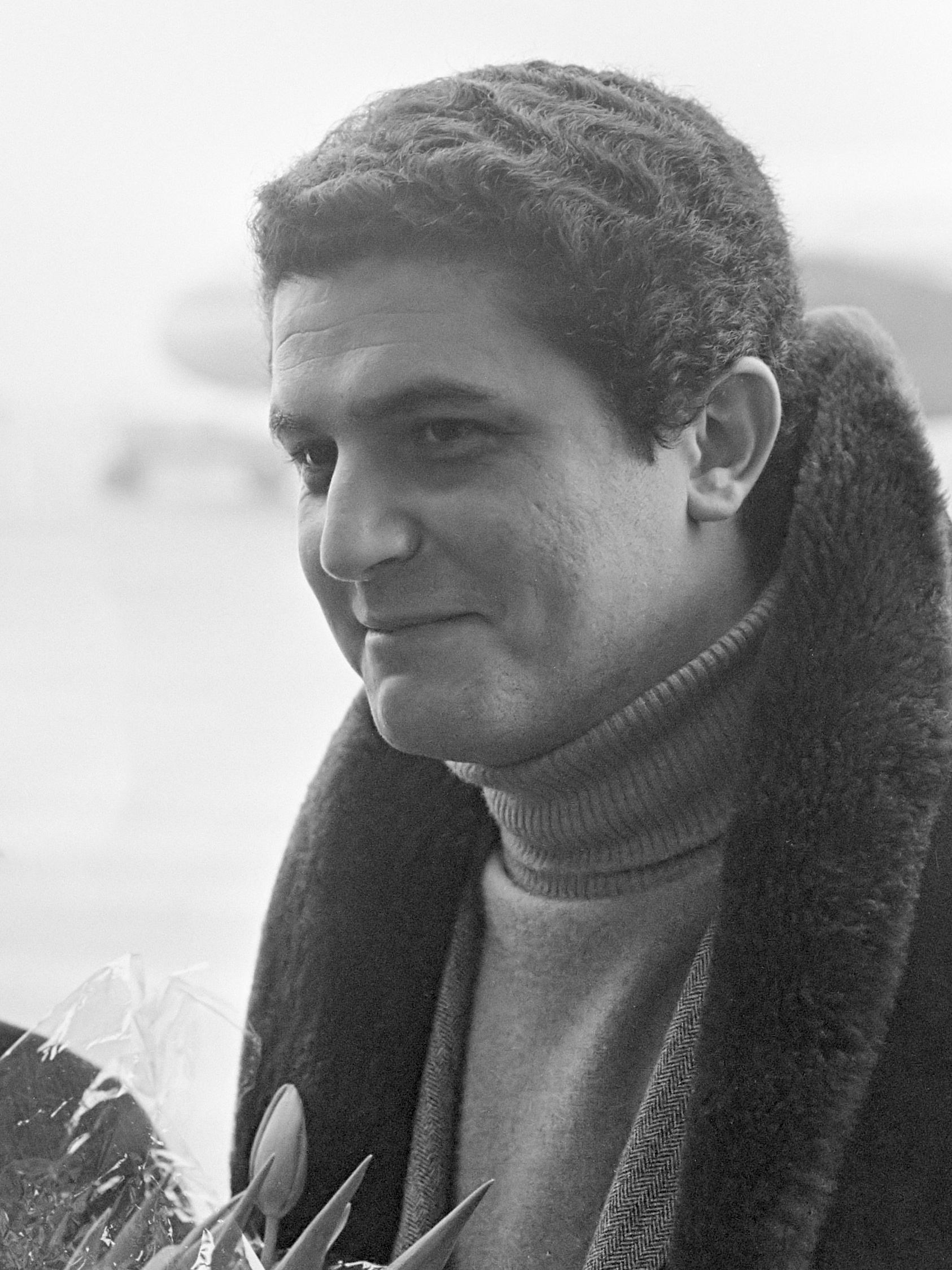
Claude Lelouch won for A Man and a Woman (1966)

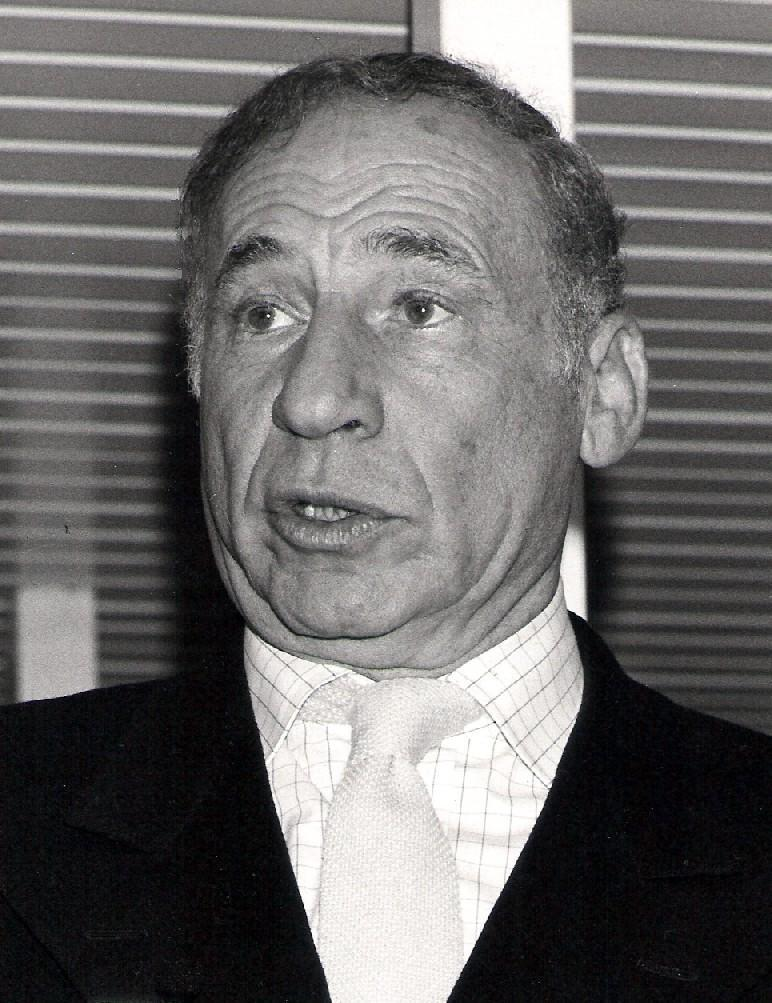
Mel Brooks won for his comedy The Producers (1968).

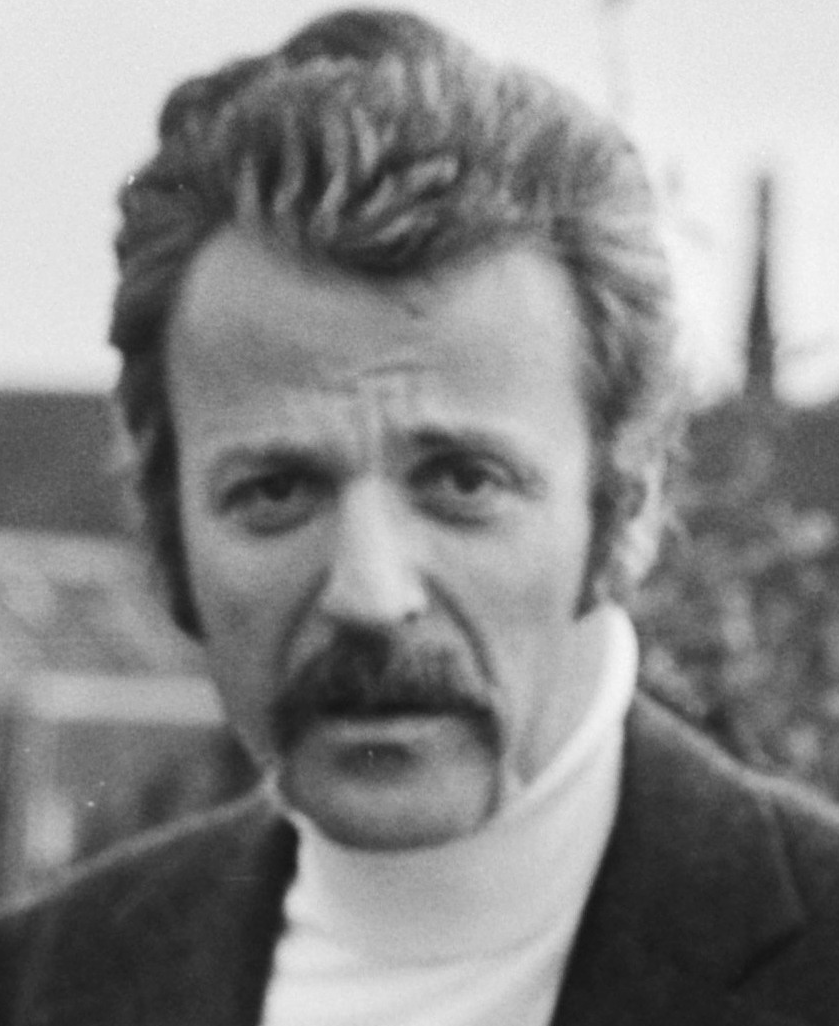
William Goldman, winner in 1969 for Butch Cassidy and the Sundance Kid.

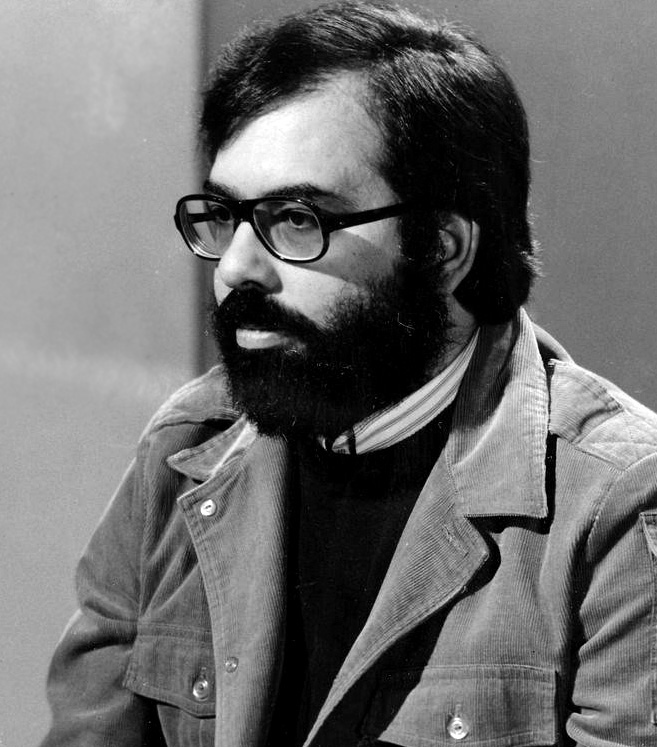
Francis Ford Coppola won for Patton (1970). (Note: Director Francis Ford Coppola won his first Oscar for this award alongside co-writer Edmund H. North)

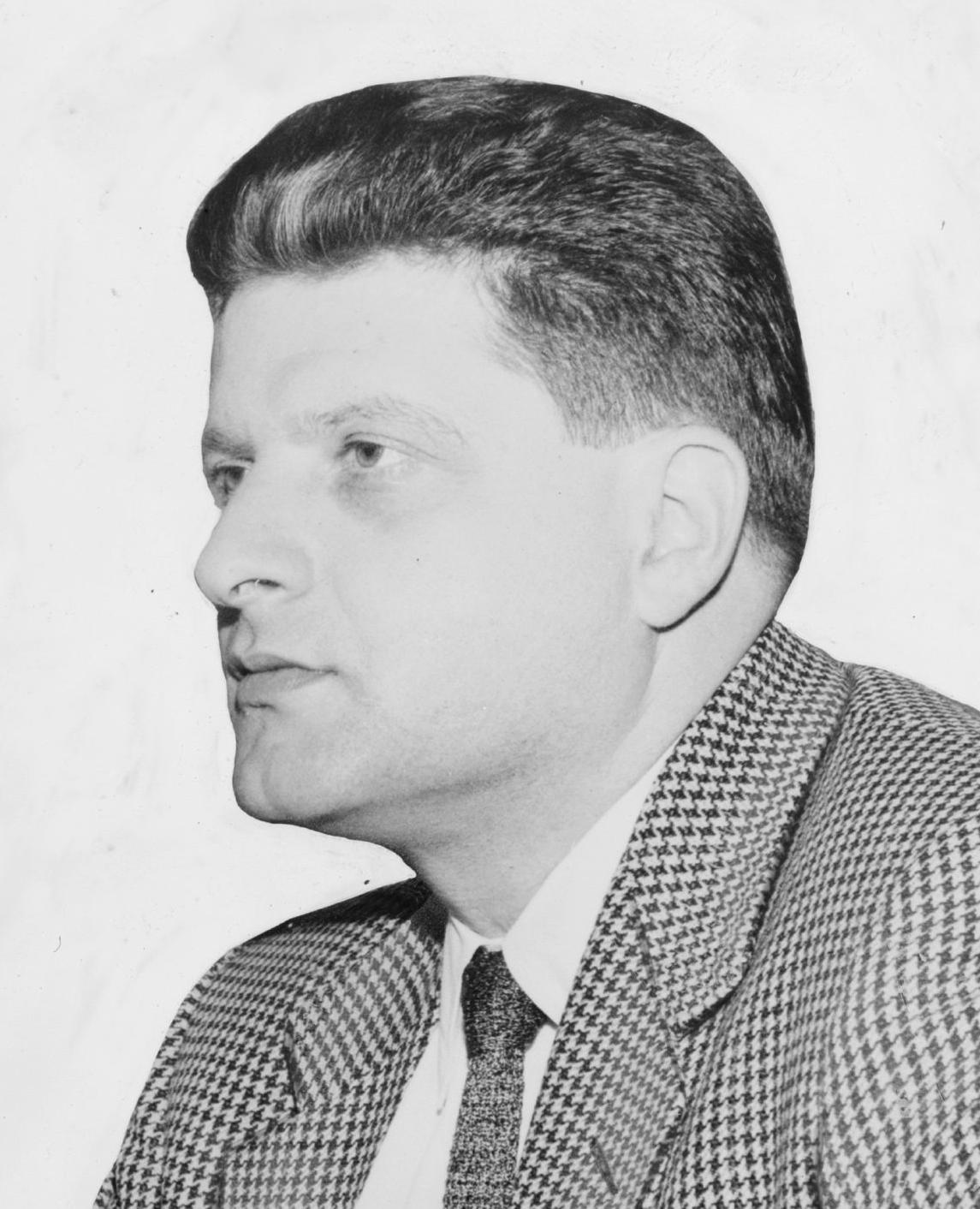
Paddy Chayefsky won twice for The Hospital (1971) and Network (1976)

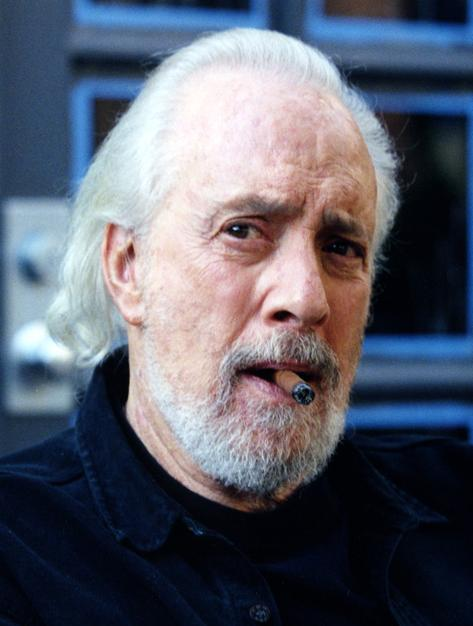
Robert Towne won for Chinatown (1975).

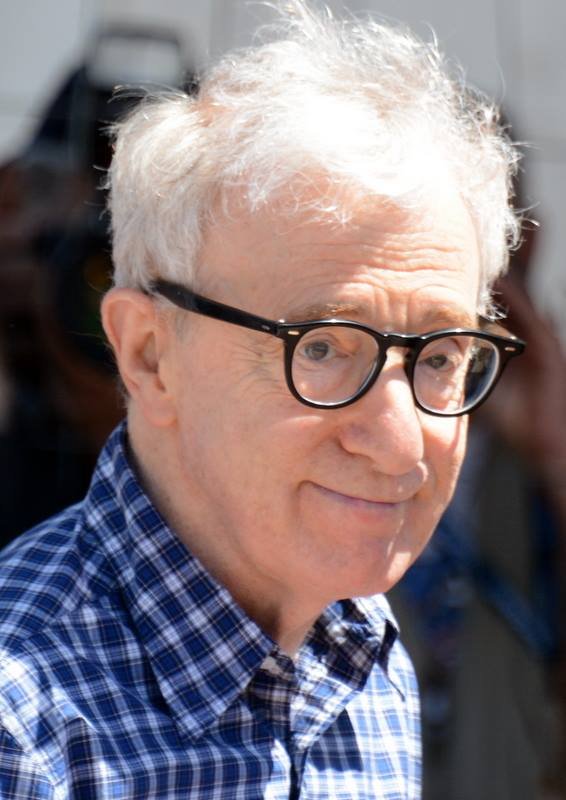
Woody Allen won thrice for Annie Hall (1977), Hannah and Her Sisters (1986), and Midnight in Paris (2011). He has received sixteen nominations total, the most of any writer. (Note: Allen won for Annie Hall along with Marshall Brickman and by himself for Hannah and Her Sisters and Midnight in Paris)

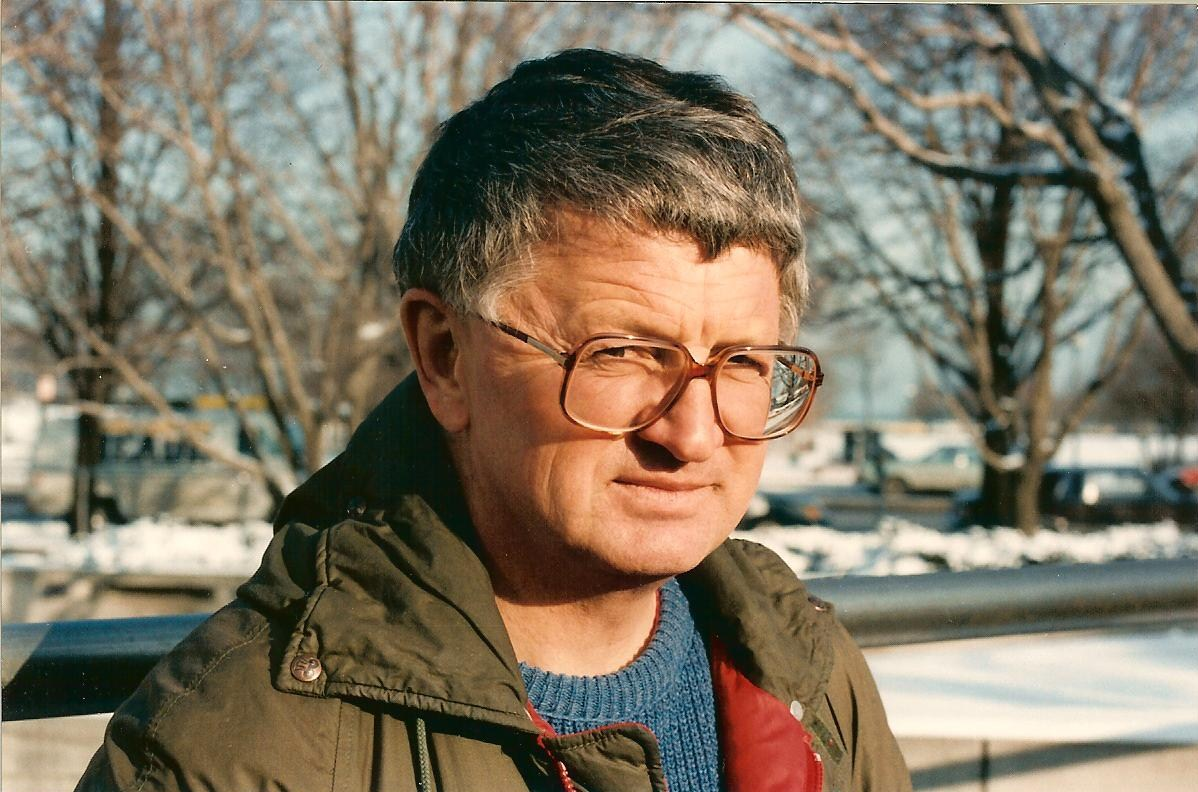
Steve Tesich won for Breaking Away (1979).

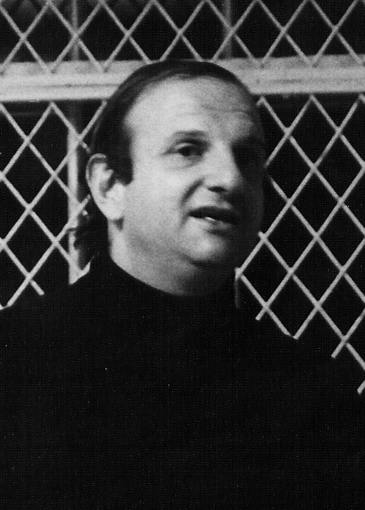
Bo Goldman won for Melvin and Howard (1980).

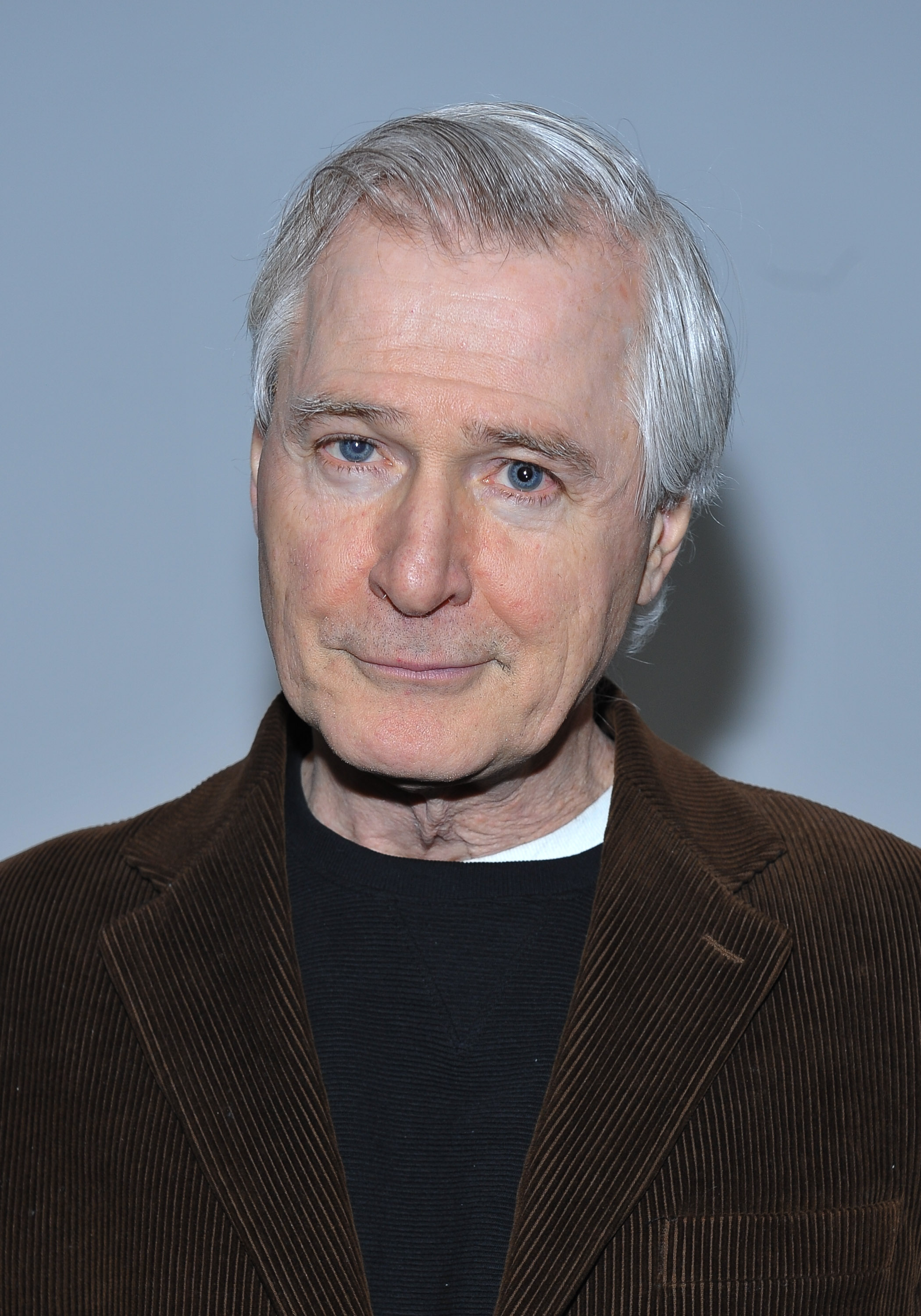
John Patrick Shanley won for Moonstruck (1987).

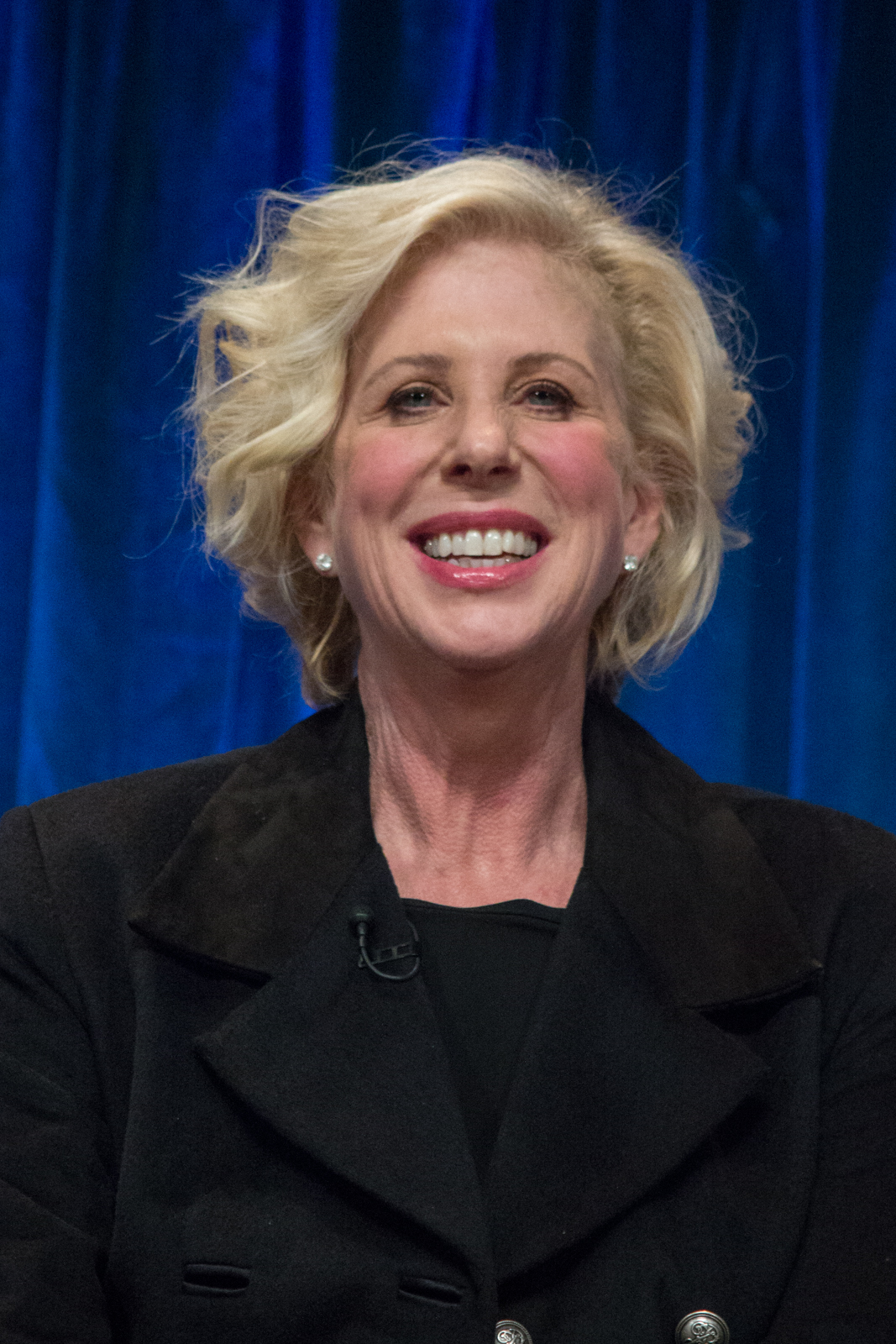
Callie Khouri won for Thelma & Louise (1991)

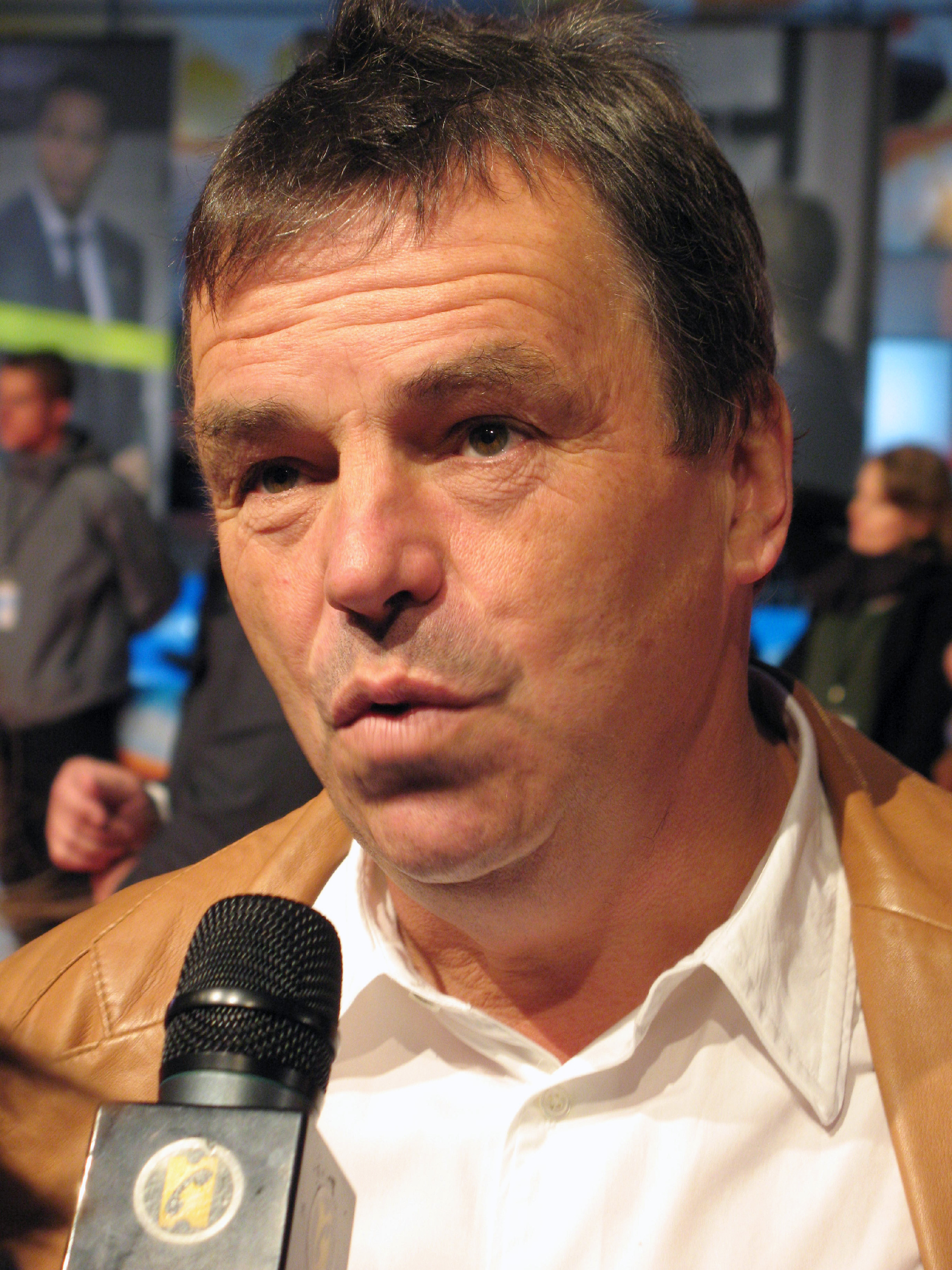
Neil Jordan won for The Crying Game in 1992.

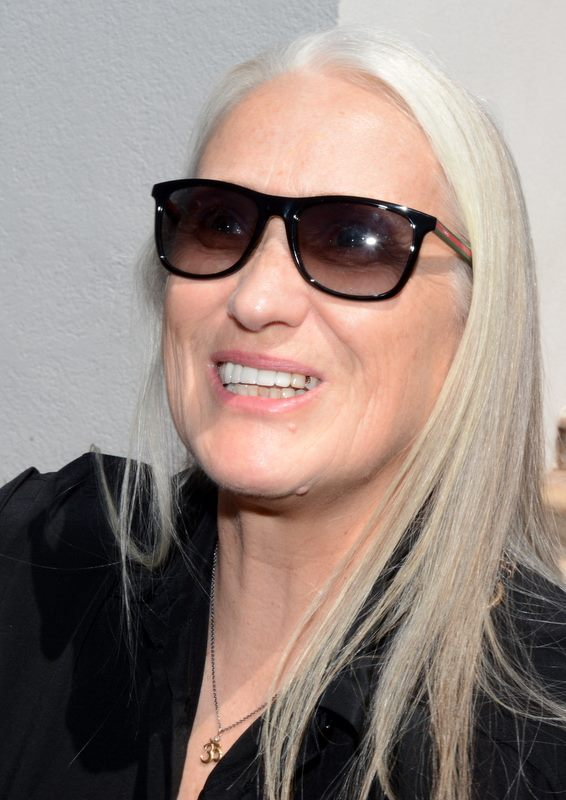
Jane Campion won for The Piano in 1993.

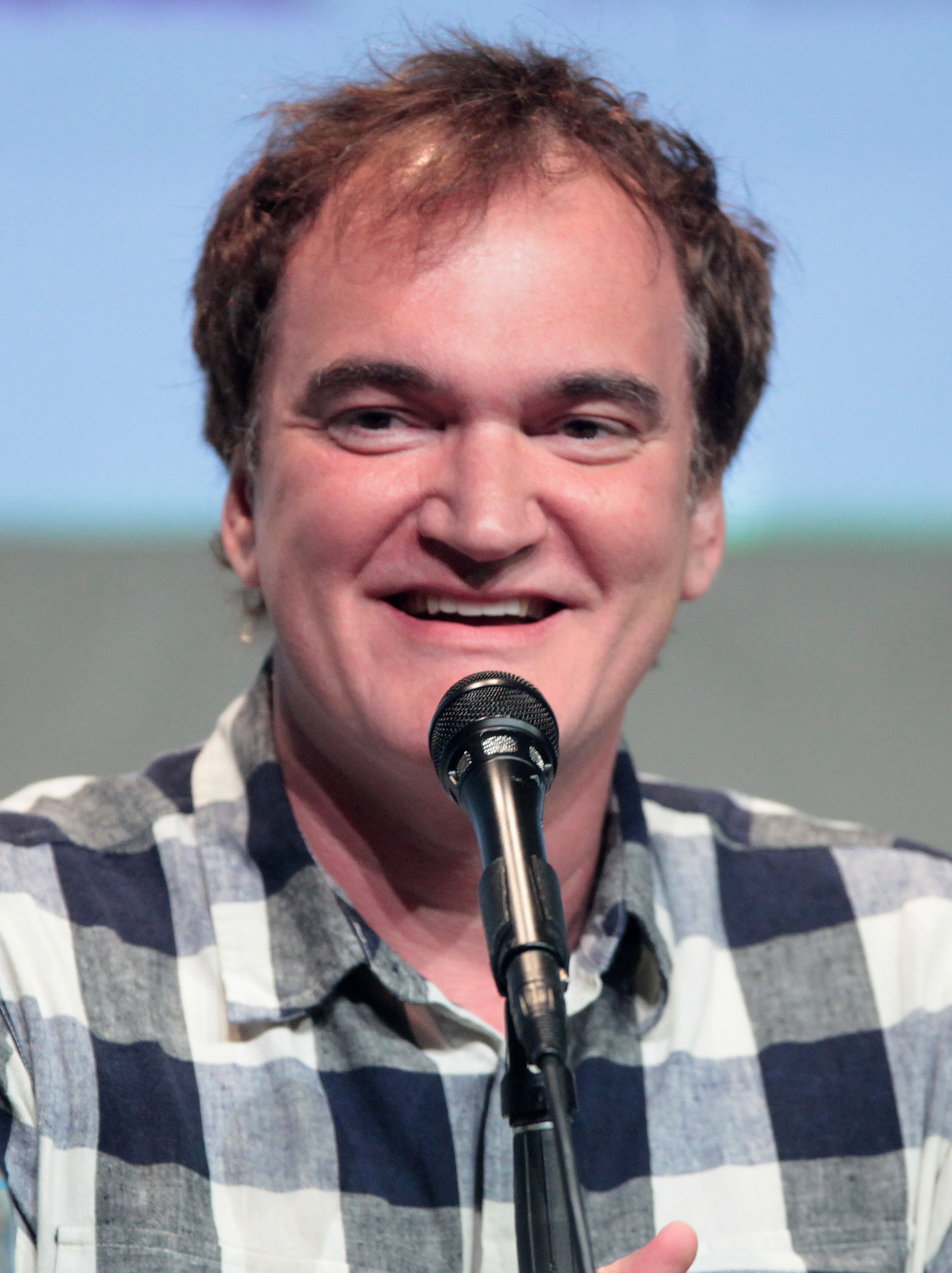
Quentin Tarantino won twice for Pulp Fiction (1994), and Django Unchained (2012)

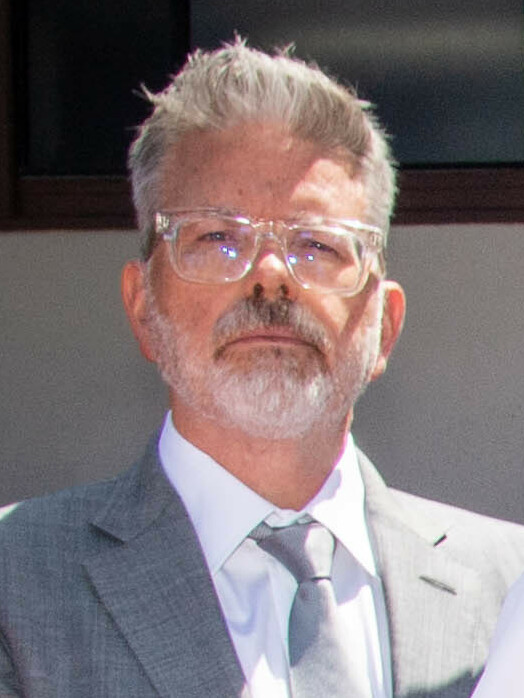
Christopher McQuarrie won for The Usual Suspects in 1995.

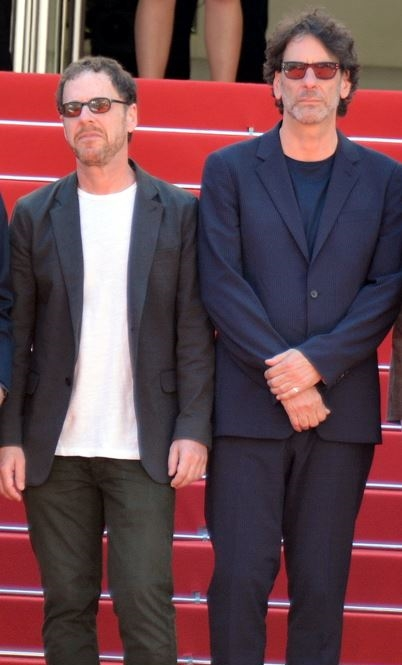
Writer-director pair the Coen brothers won for Fargo (1996)

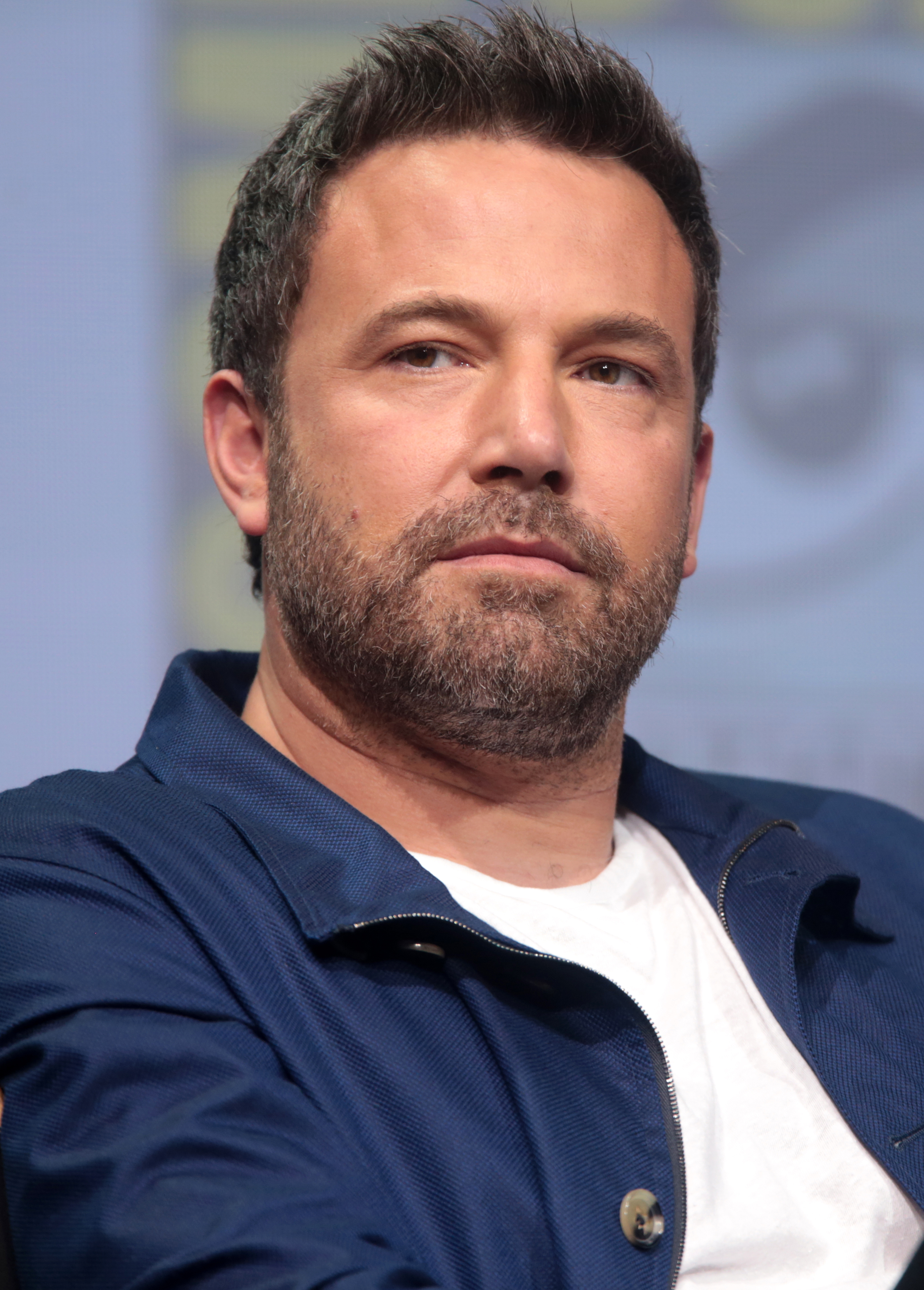
Ben Affleck won for co-writing Good Will Hunting (1997)

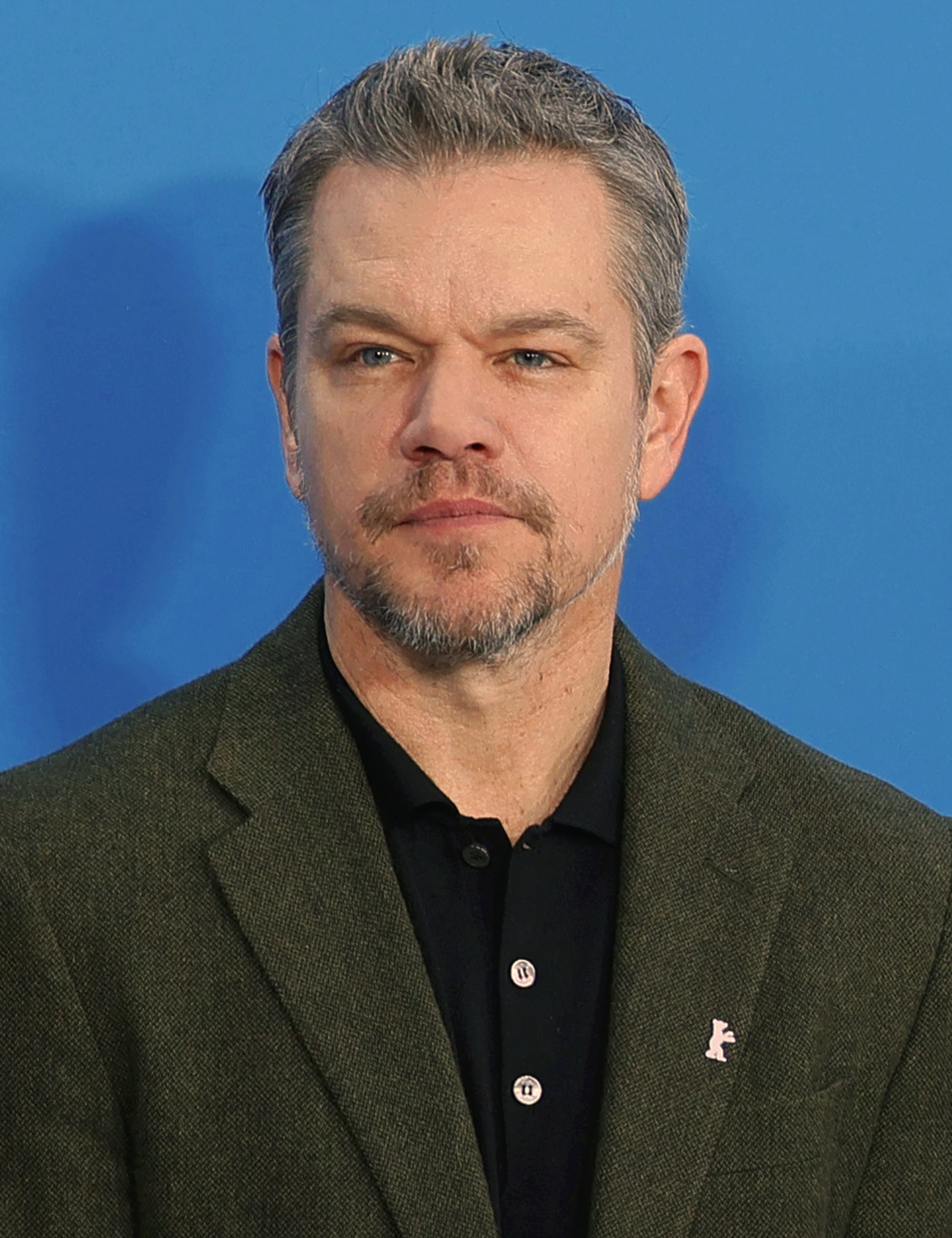
Matt Damon won for co-writing Good Will Hunting (1997)

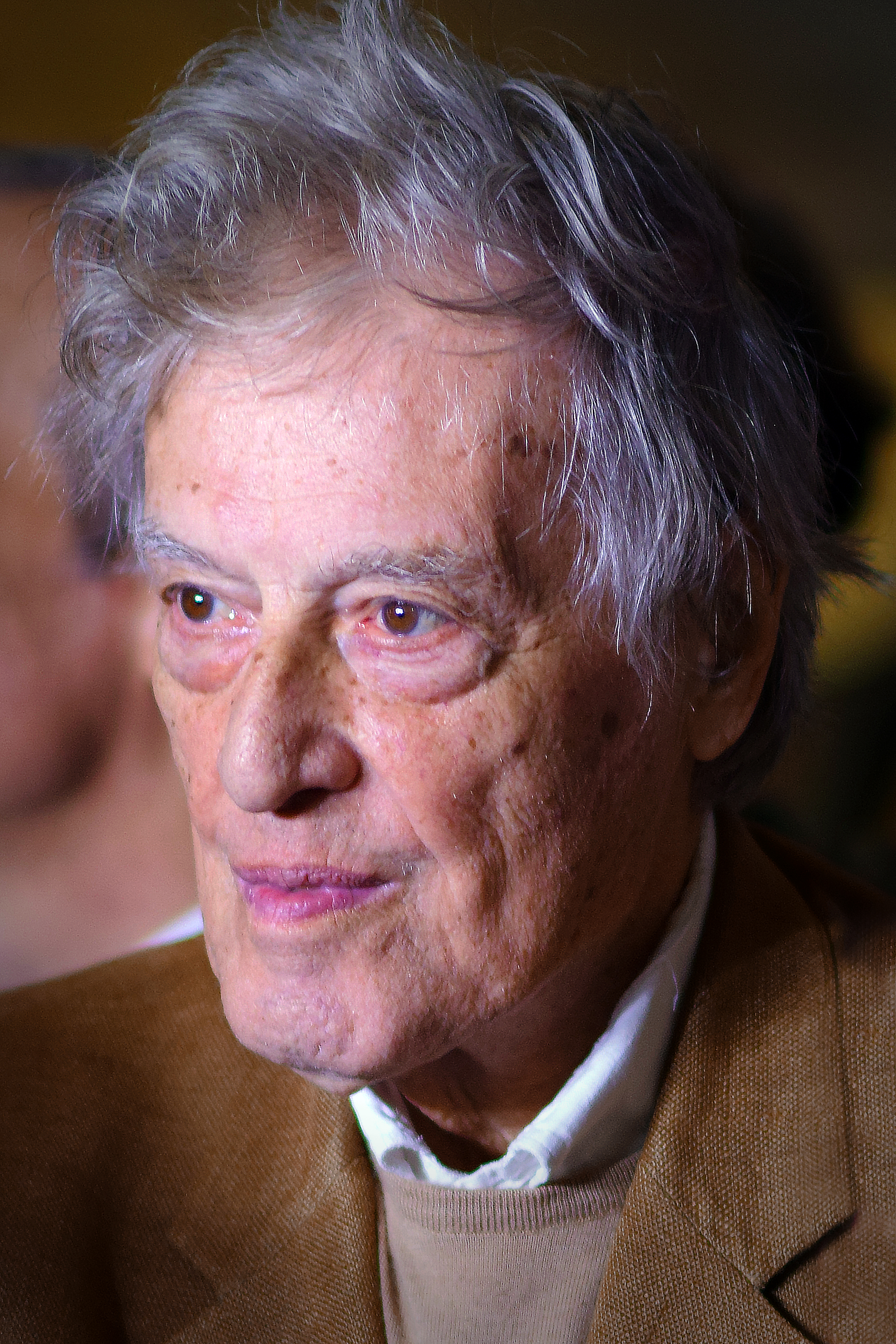
Tom Stoppard won for Shakespeare in Love (1998)

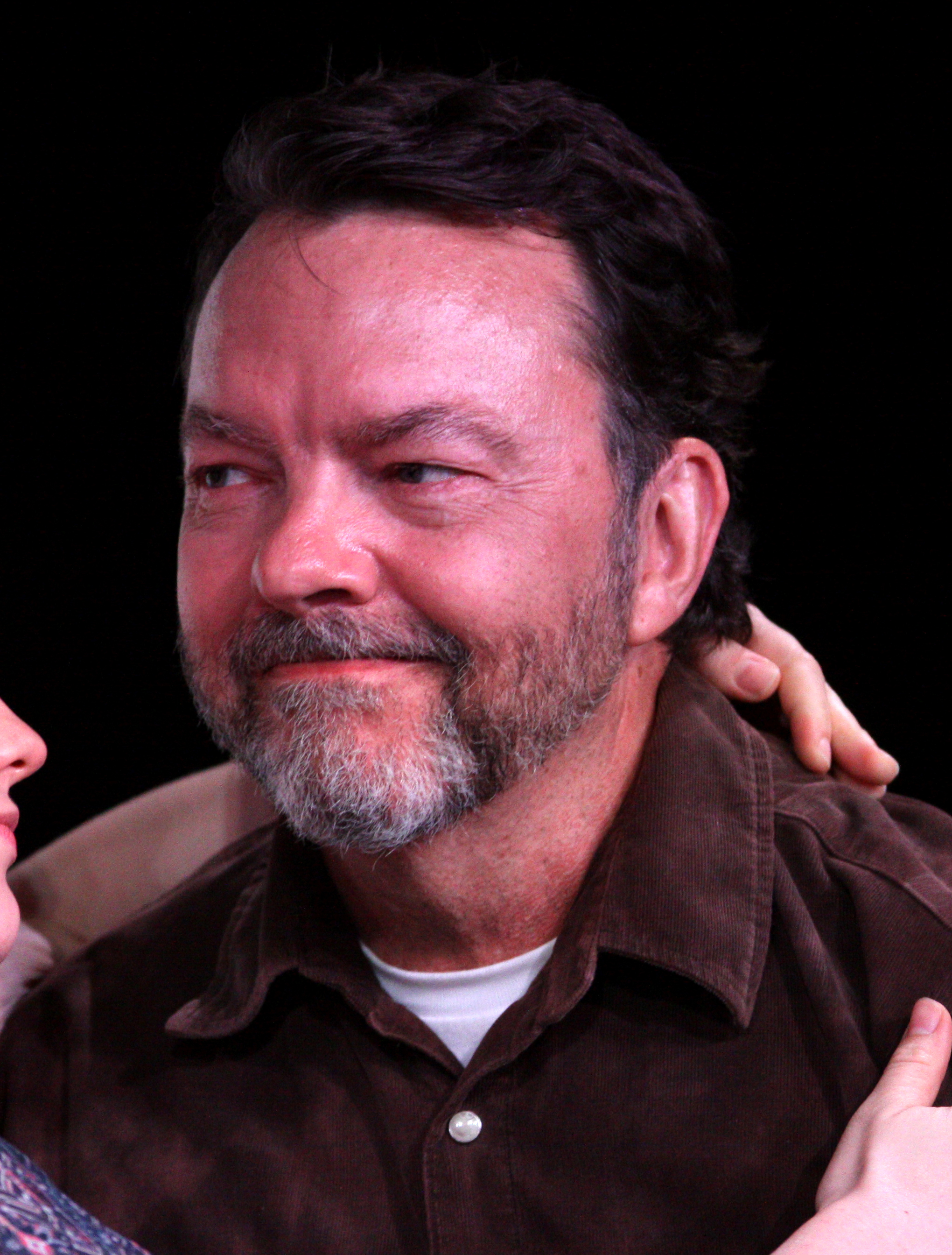
Alan Ball won for American Beauty (1999)

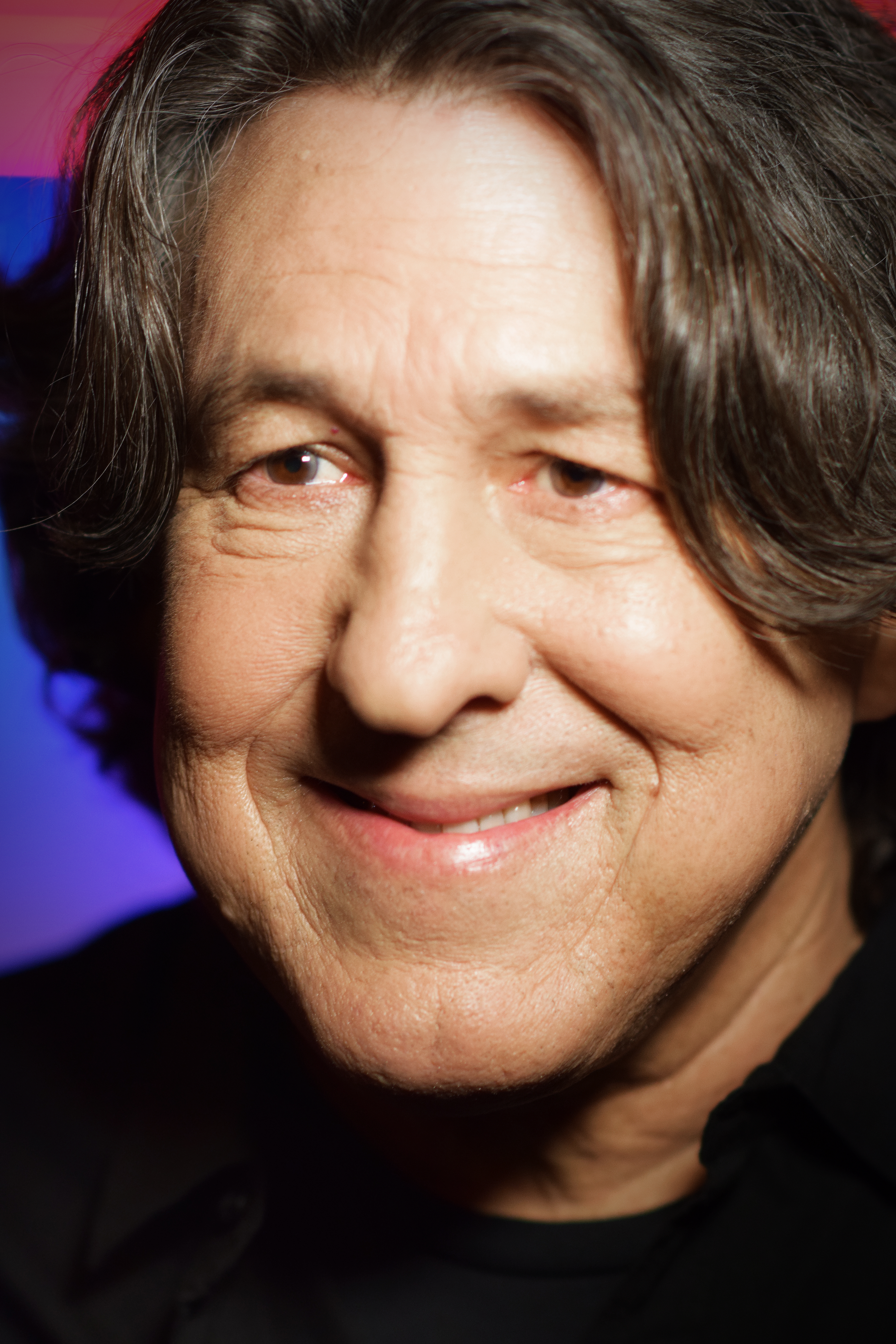
Cameron Crowe won for Almost Famous (2000)

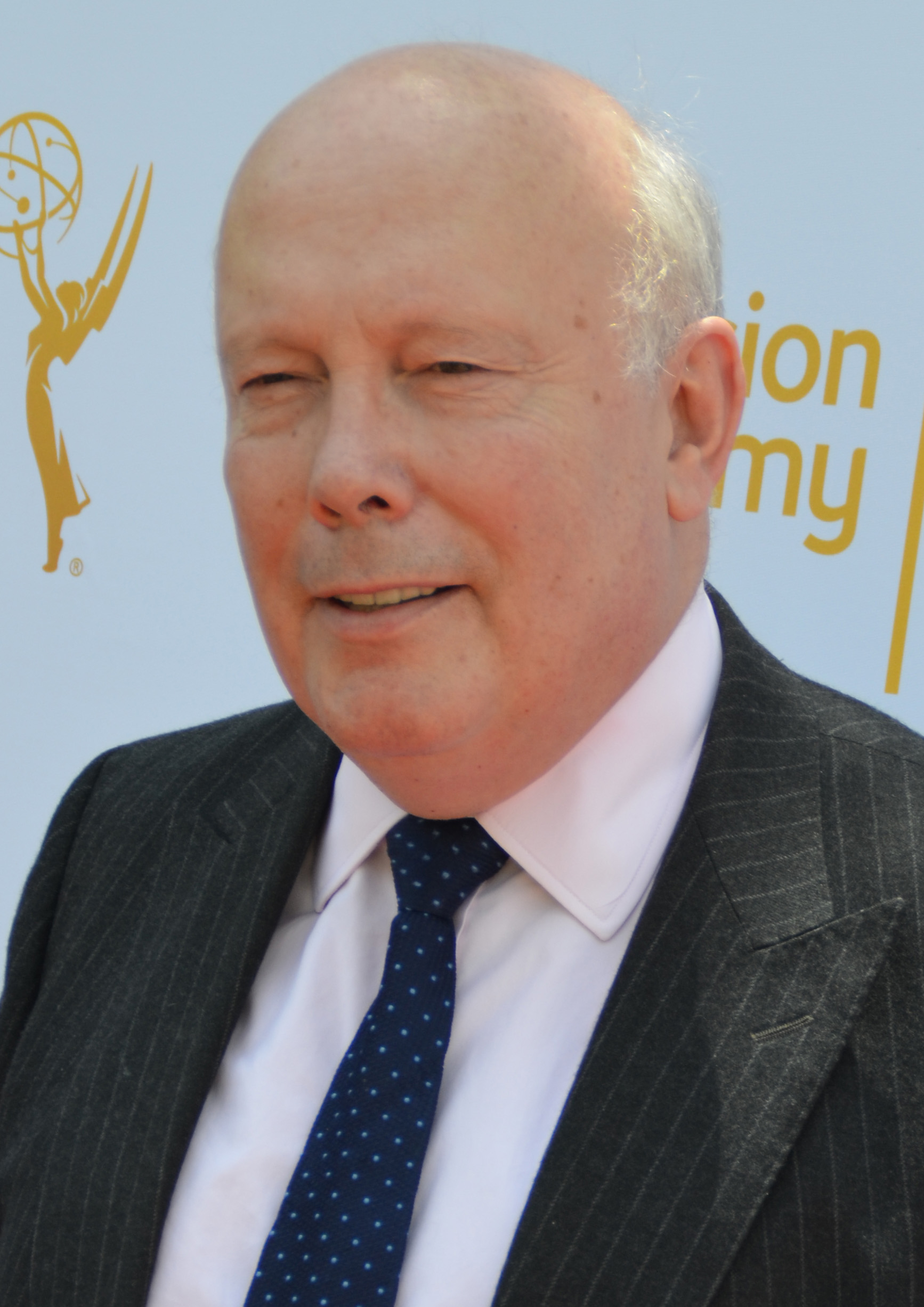
Julian Fellowes won for Gosford Park (2001)

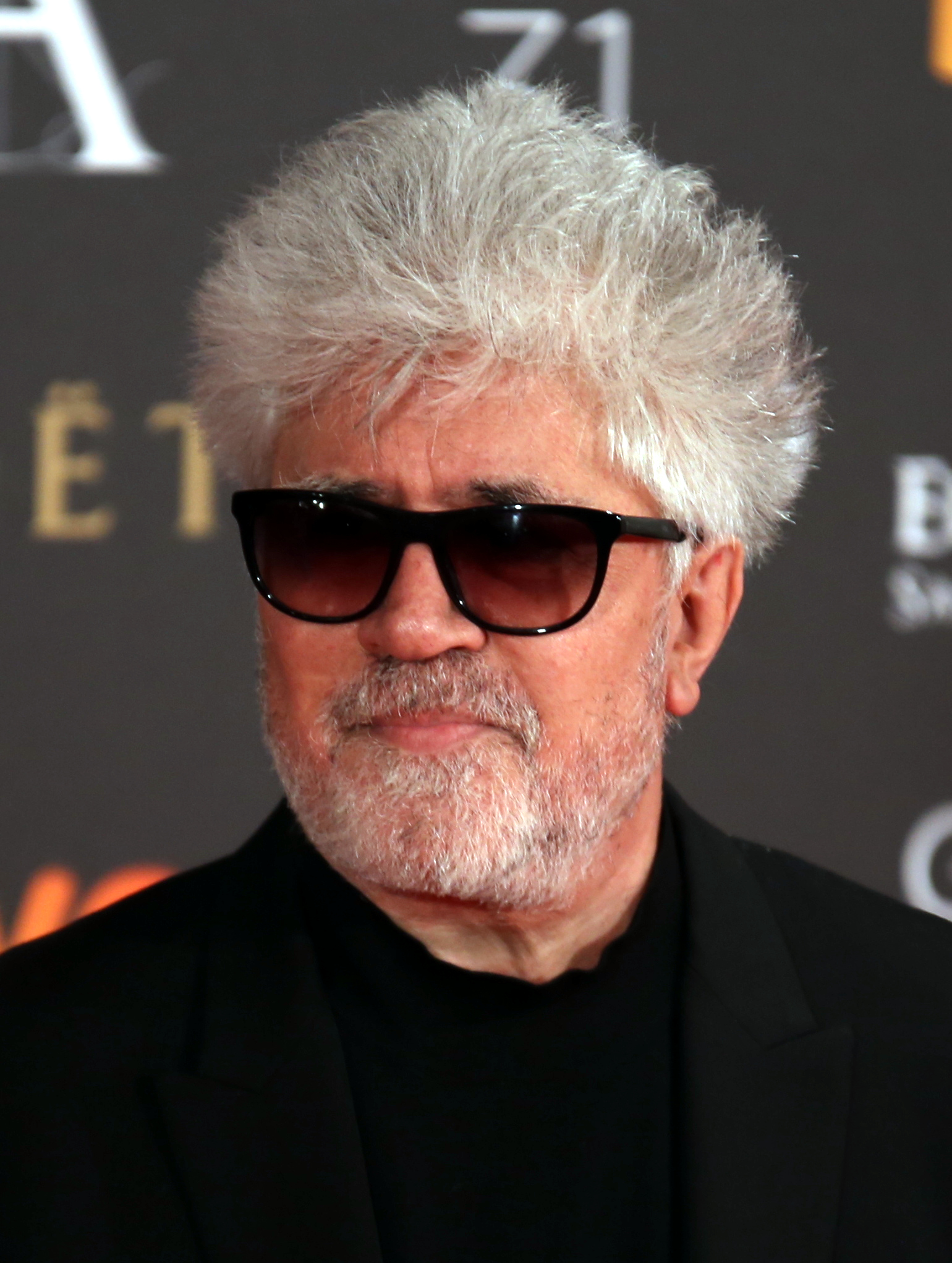
Pedro Almodóvar won for Talk to Her (2002)

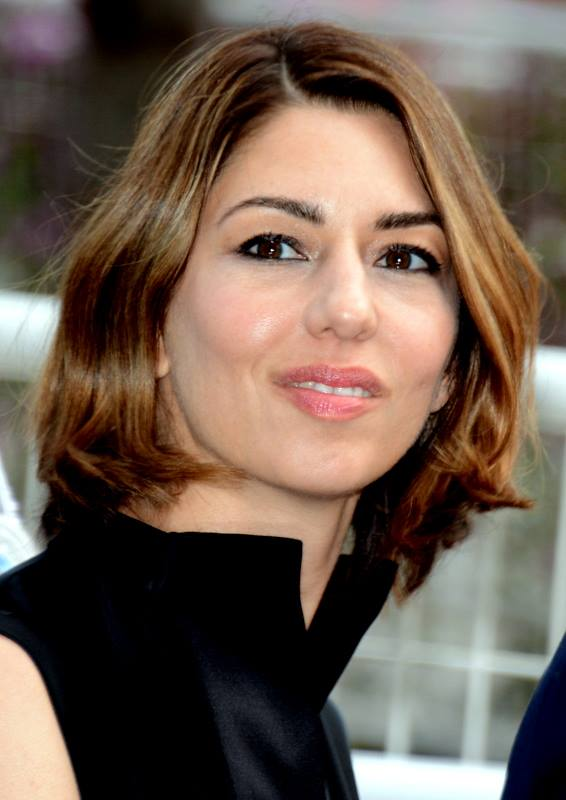
Sofia Coppola won for 2003's Lost in Translation. Her father previously won for Patton. (Note: The Coppolas are the only father-daughter pair to have won this category)

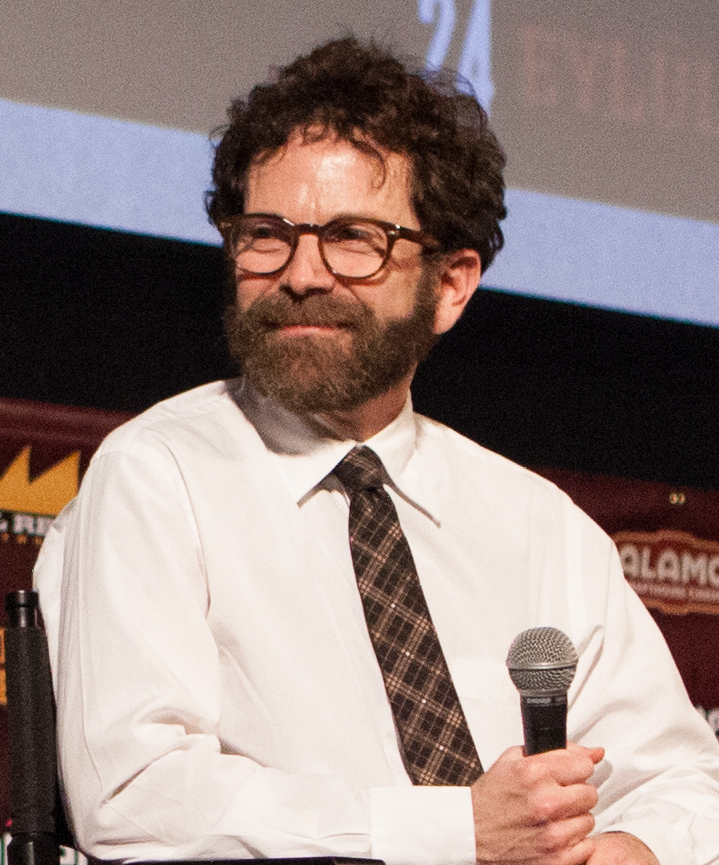
Charlie Kaufman won for Eternal Sunshine of the Spotless Mind (2004)

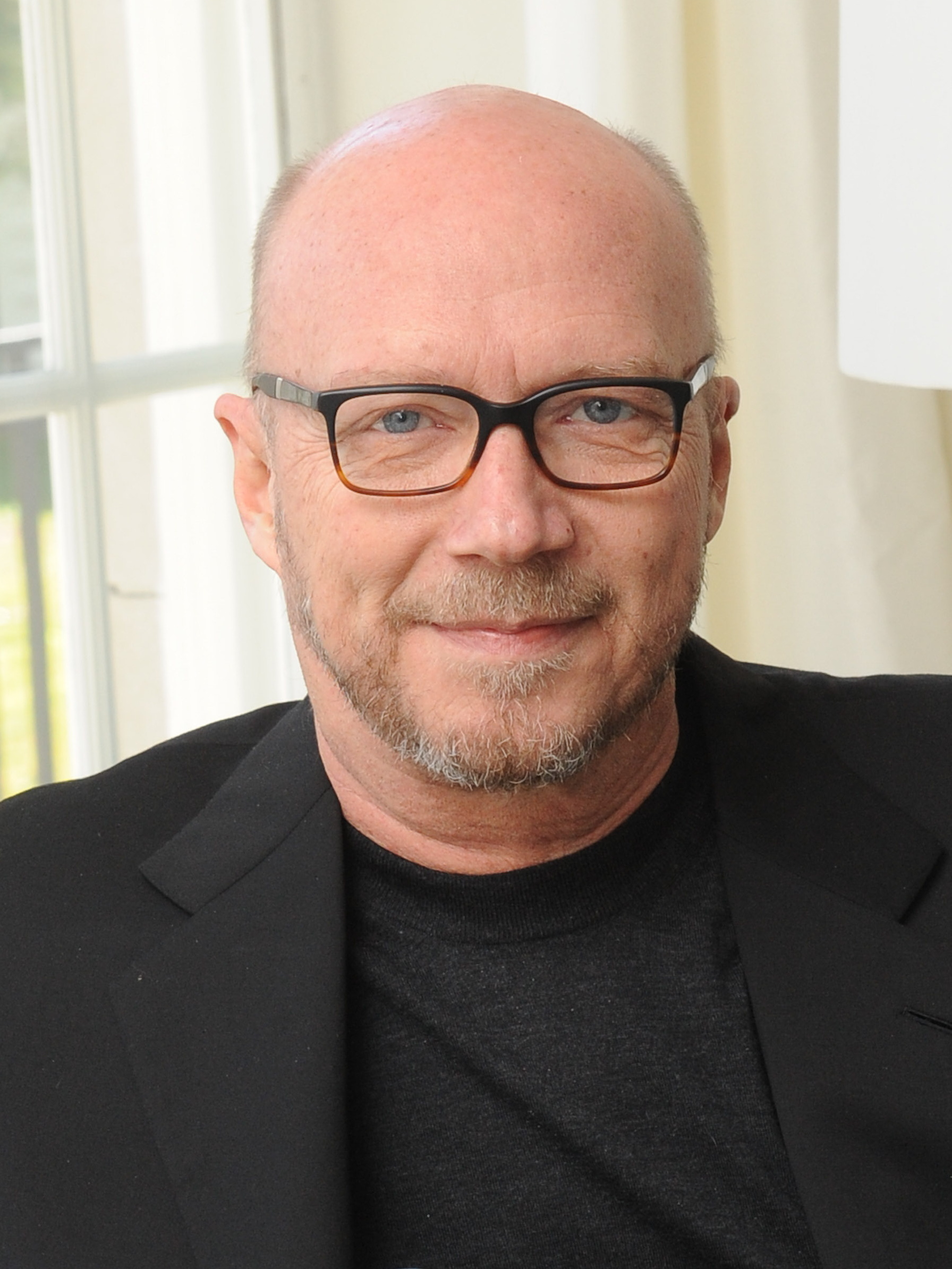
Paul Haggis won for Crash (2005)

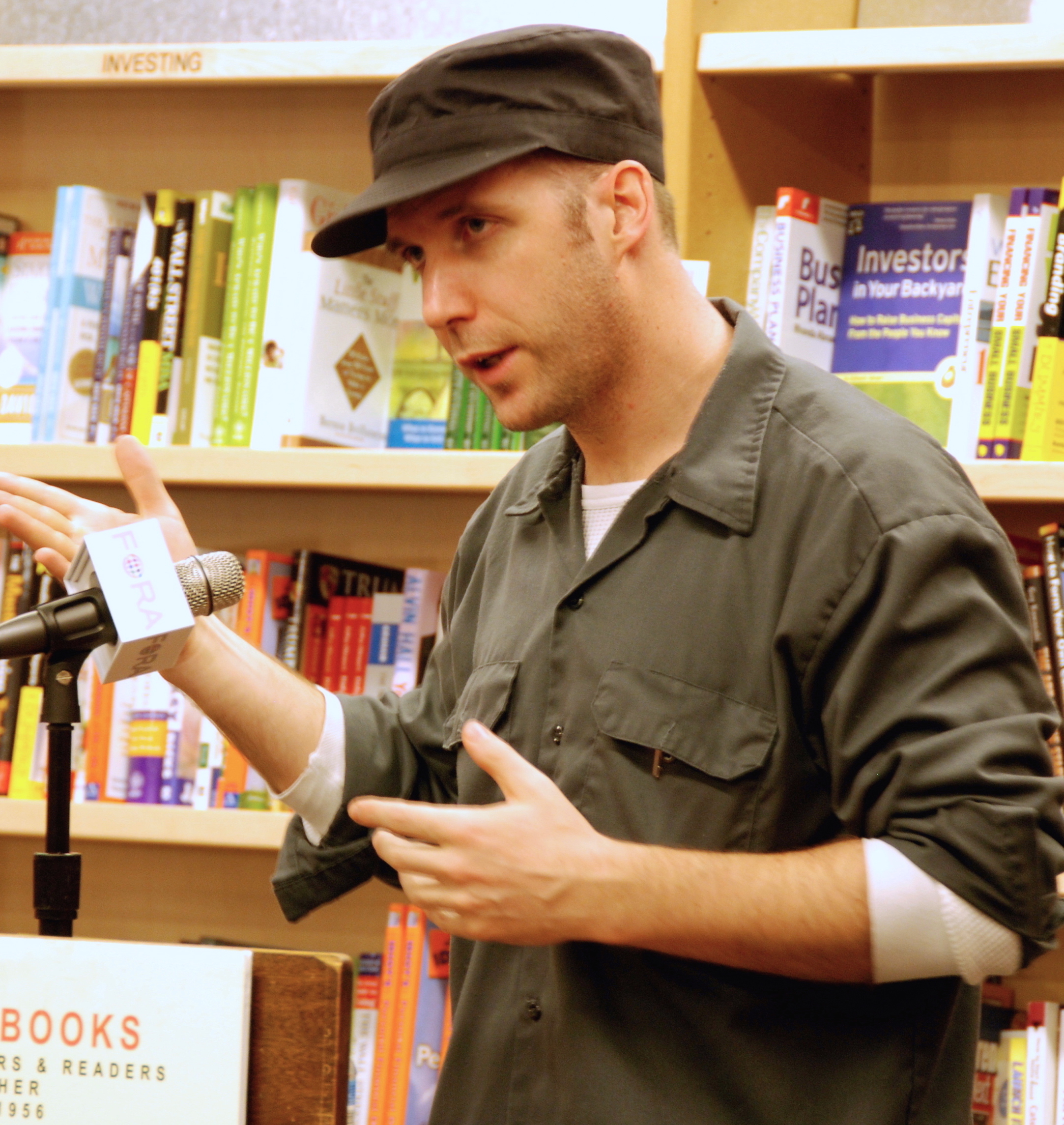
Michael Arndt won for Little Miss Sunshine (2006)

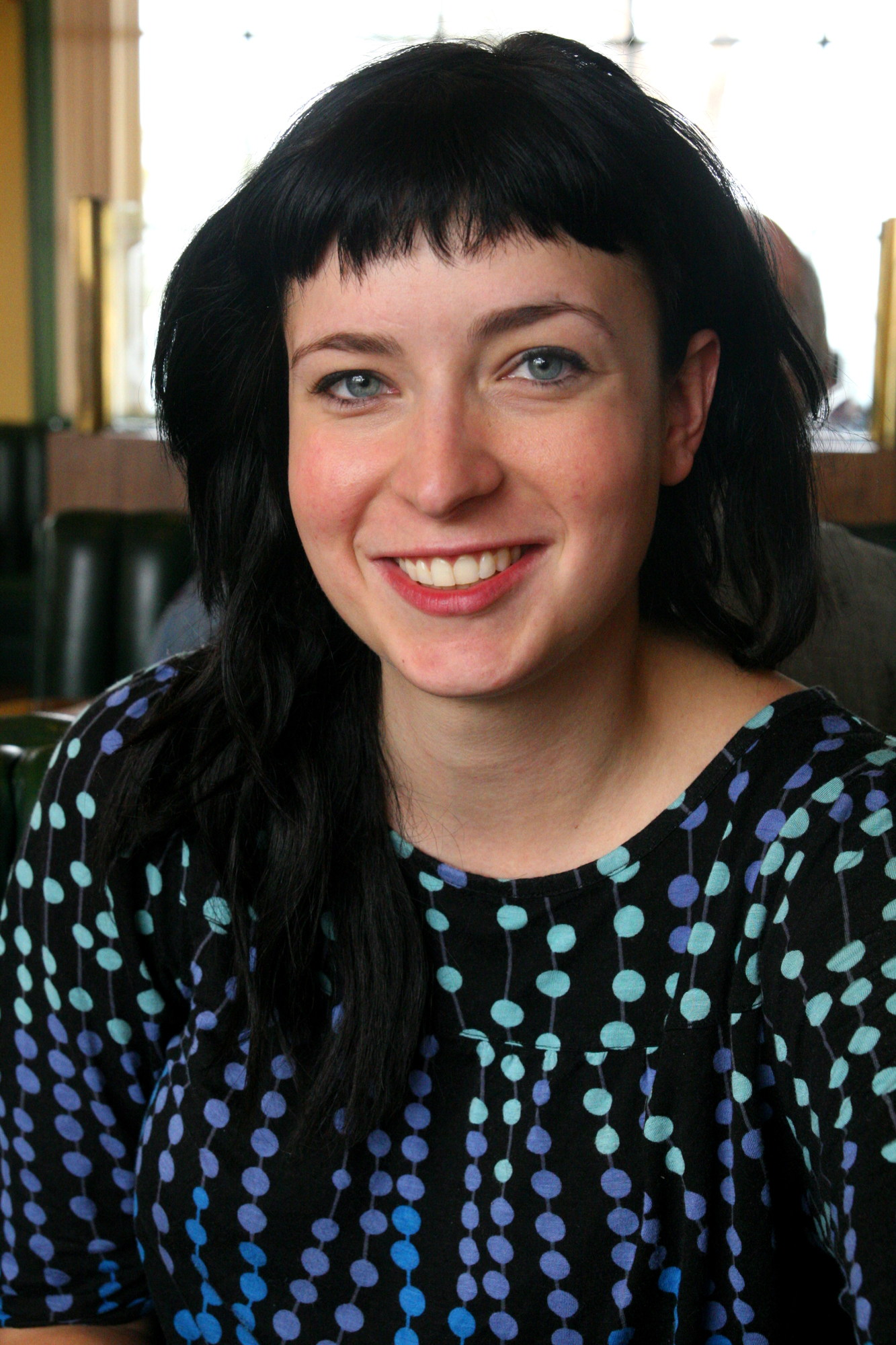
Diablo Cody won for 2007's Juno.

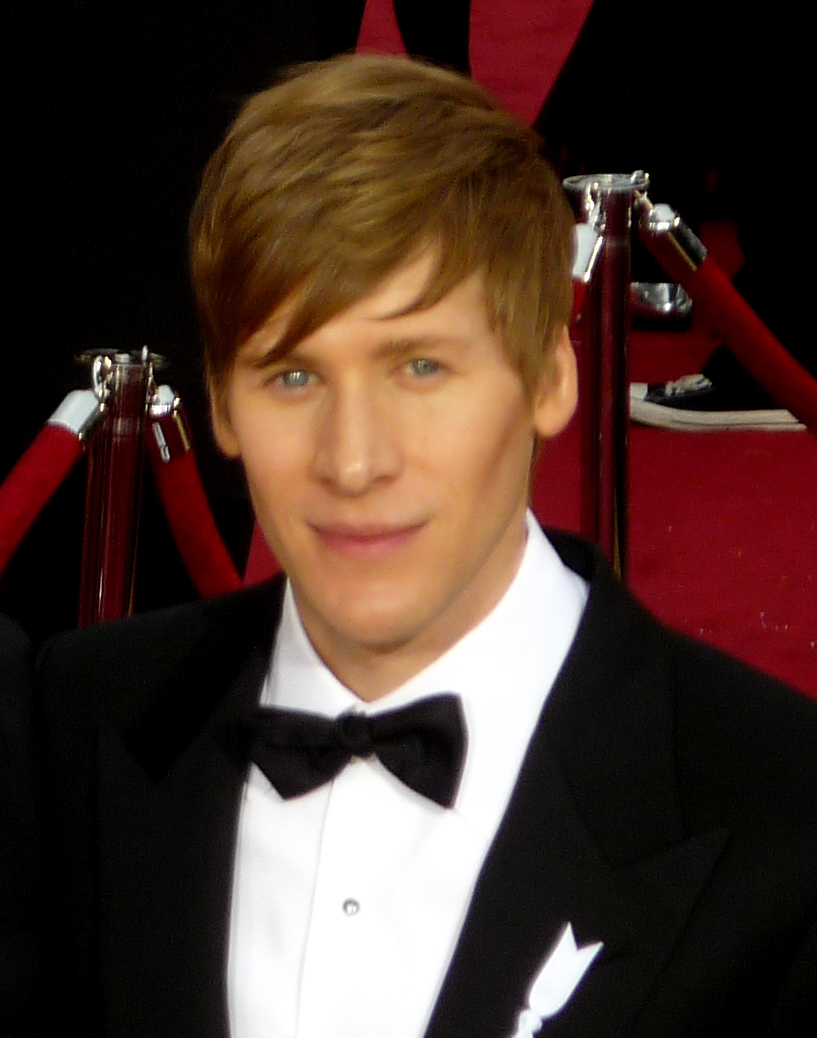
Dustin Lance Black won for 2008's Milk.

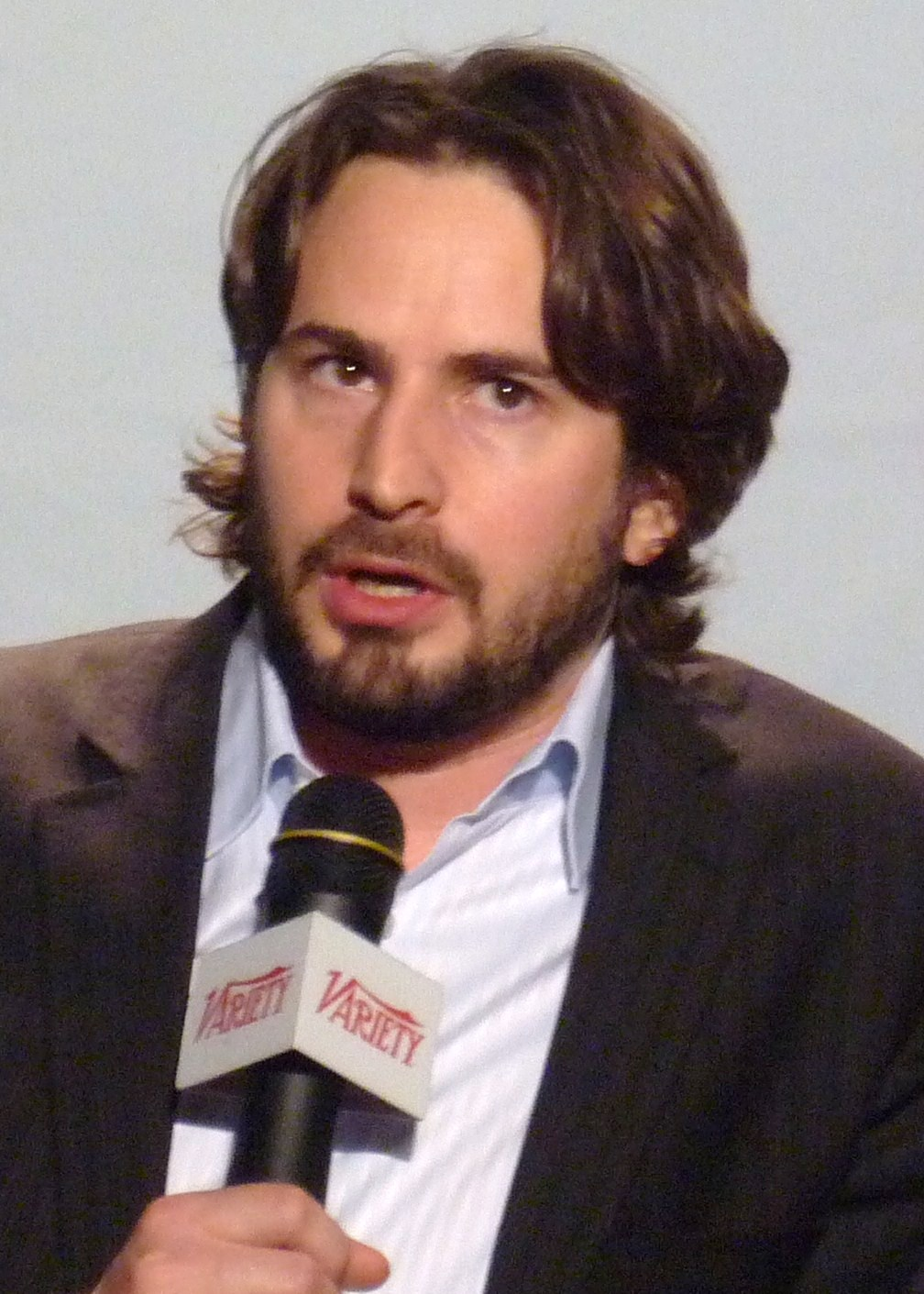
Mark Boal won for 2009's The Hurt Locker.

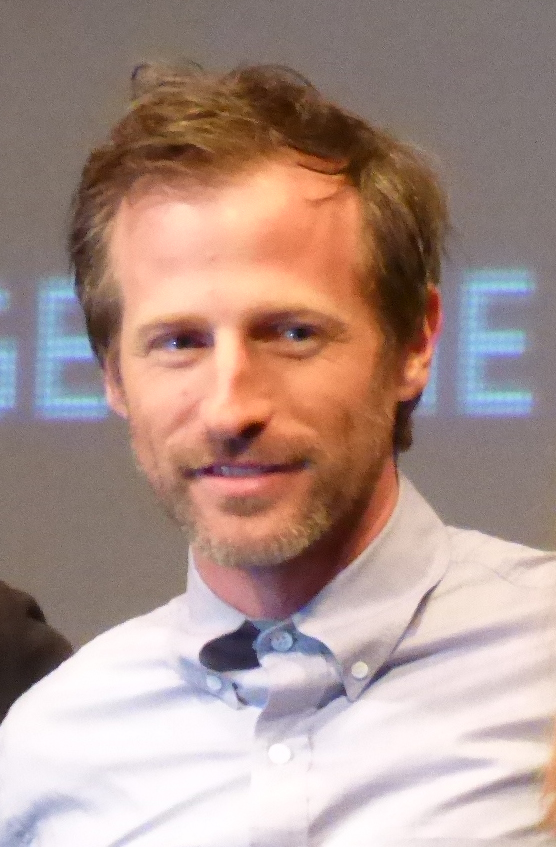
Spike Jonze won for Her (2013).

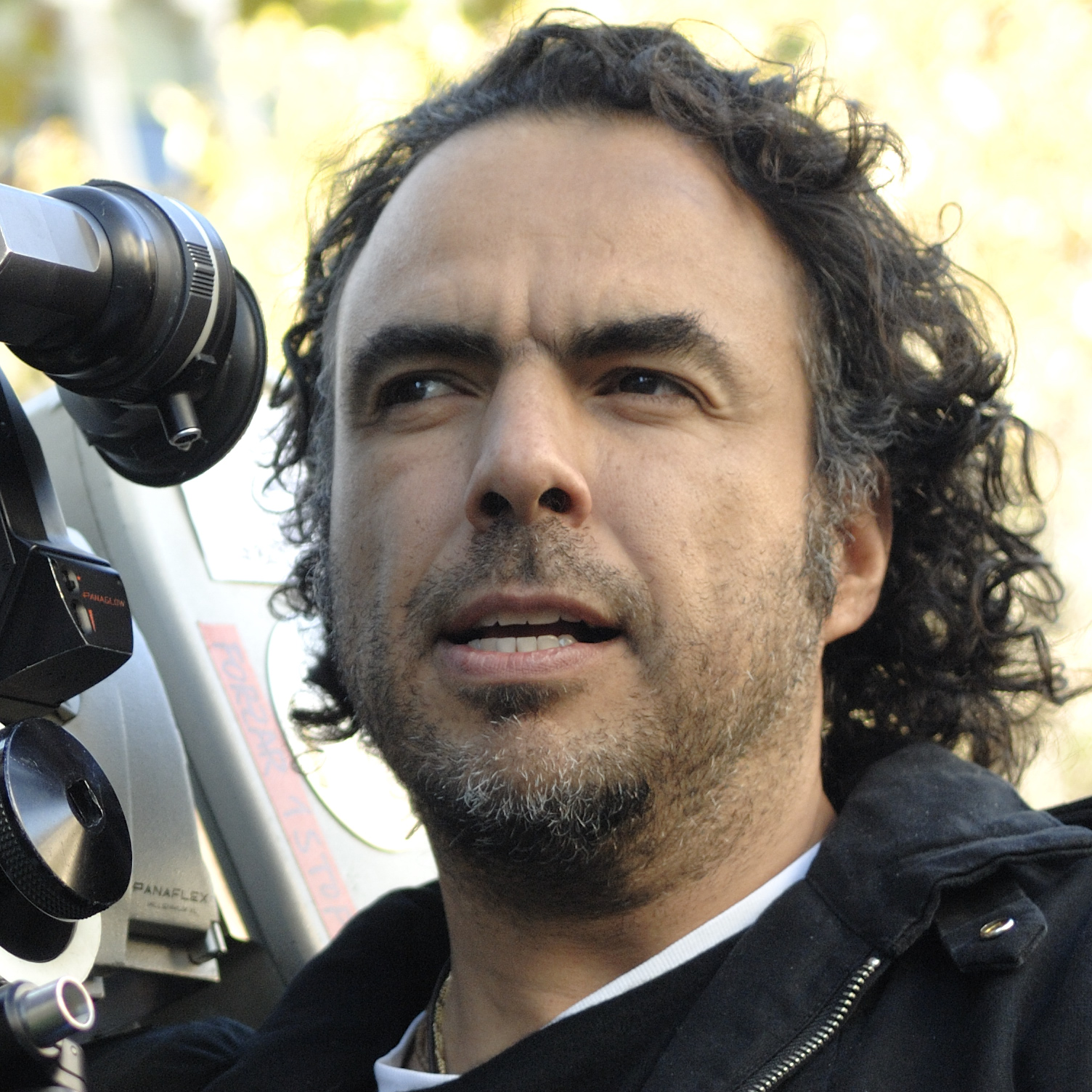
Alejandro G. Iñárritu won for Birdman (2014).

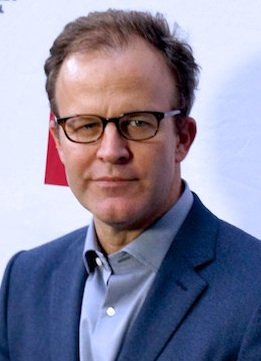
Tom McCarthy won for Spotlight (2015).

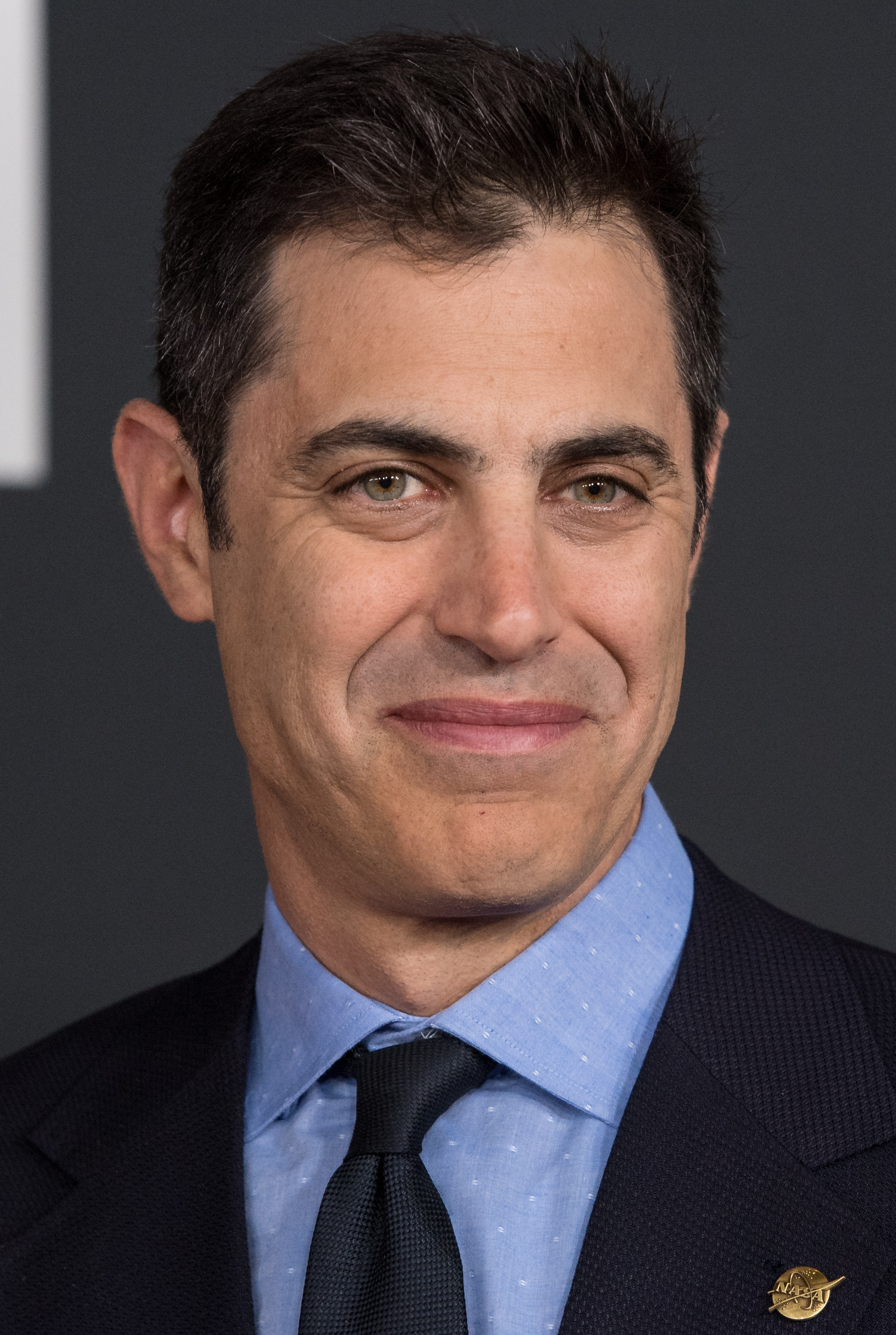
Josh Singer won for co-writing Spotlight (2015)

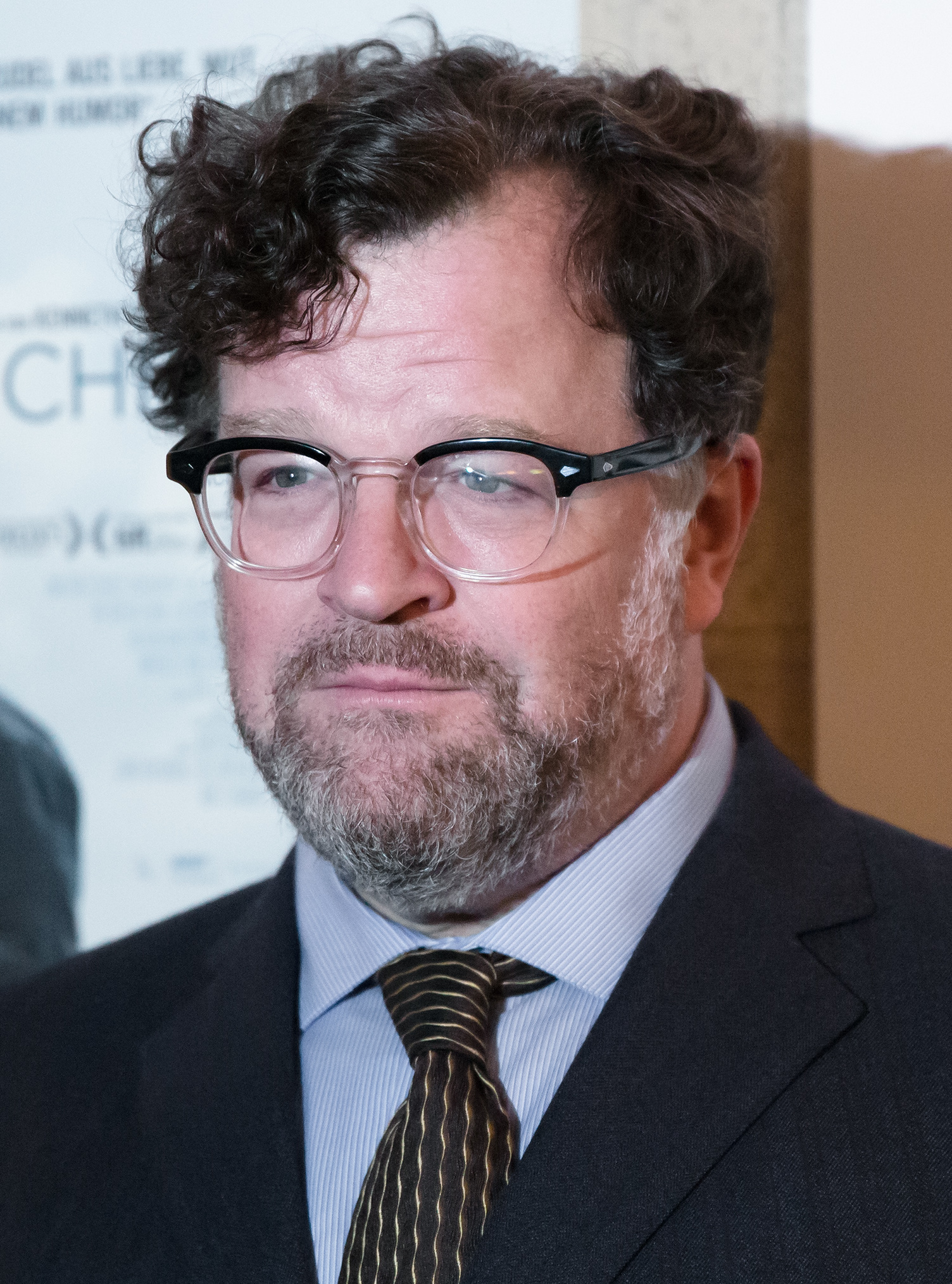
Kenneth Lonergan won for Manchester by the Sea (2016).

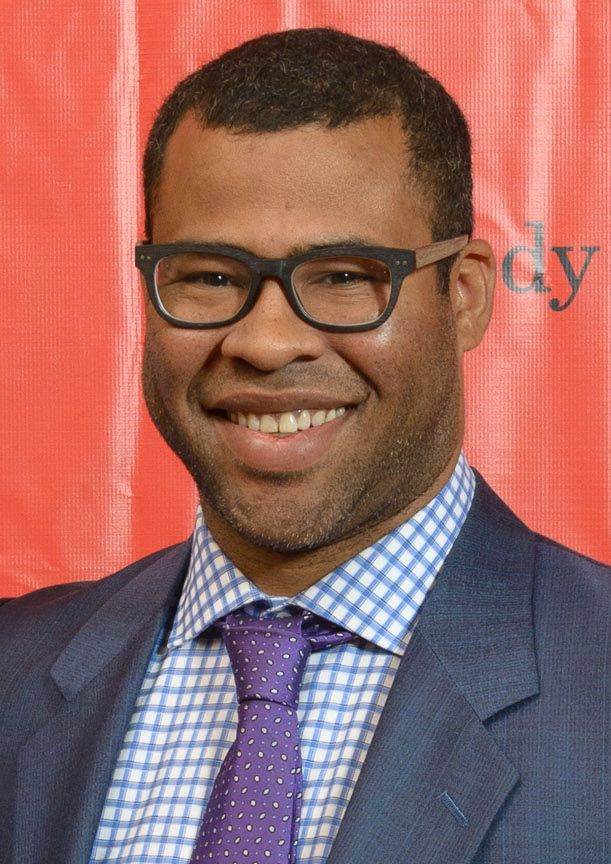
Jordan Peele became the first African-American to win with Get Out (2017).

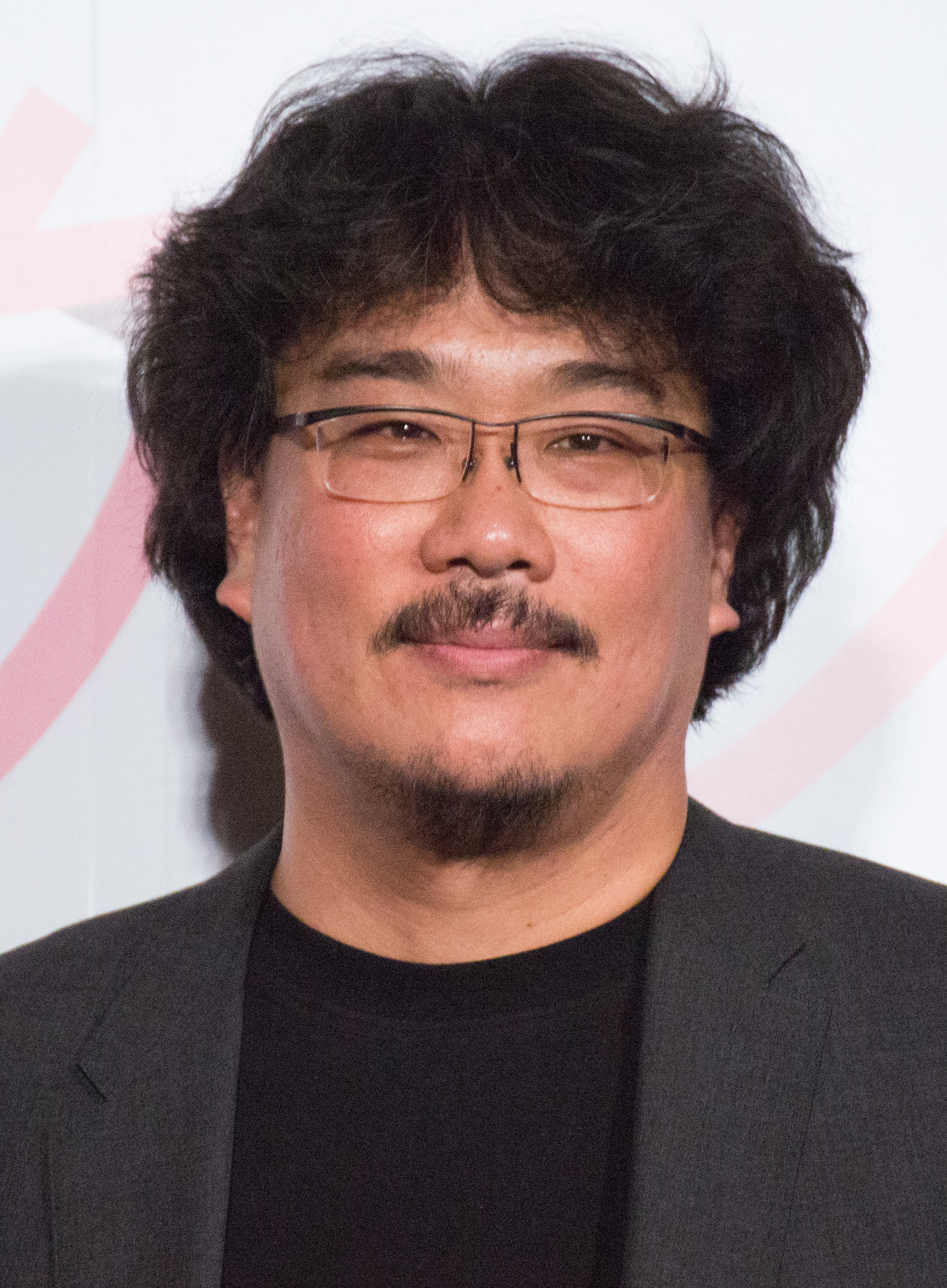
Bong Joon-ho won for Parasite (2019), co-written with Han Jin-won.

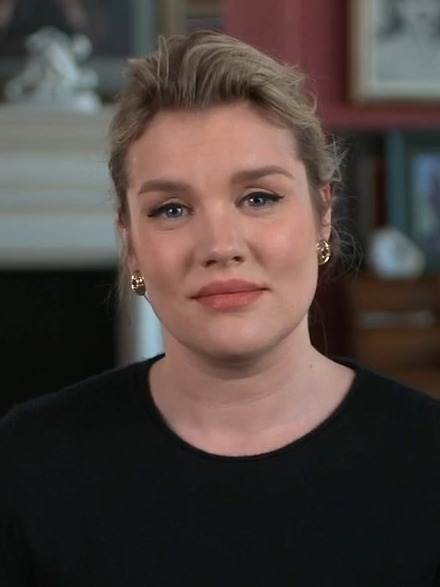
Emerald Fennell won for Promising Young Woman (2020).

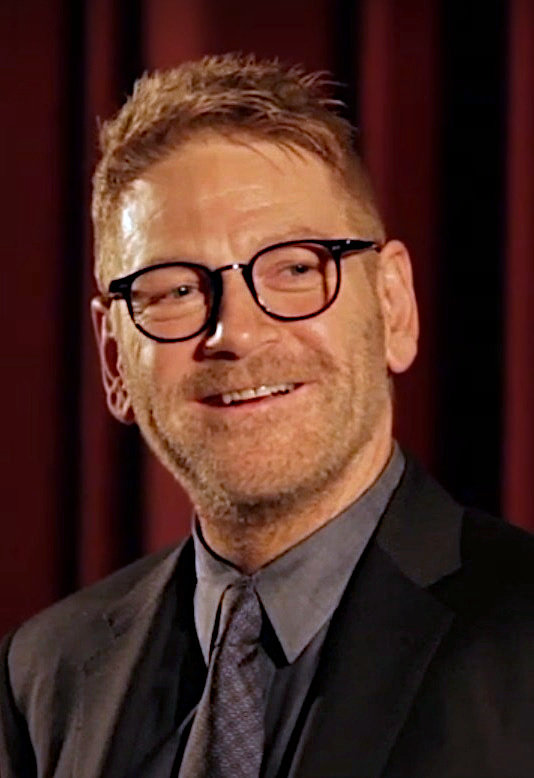
Kenneth Branagh won for Belfast (2021)

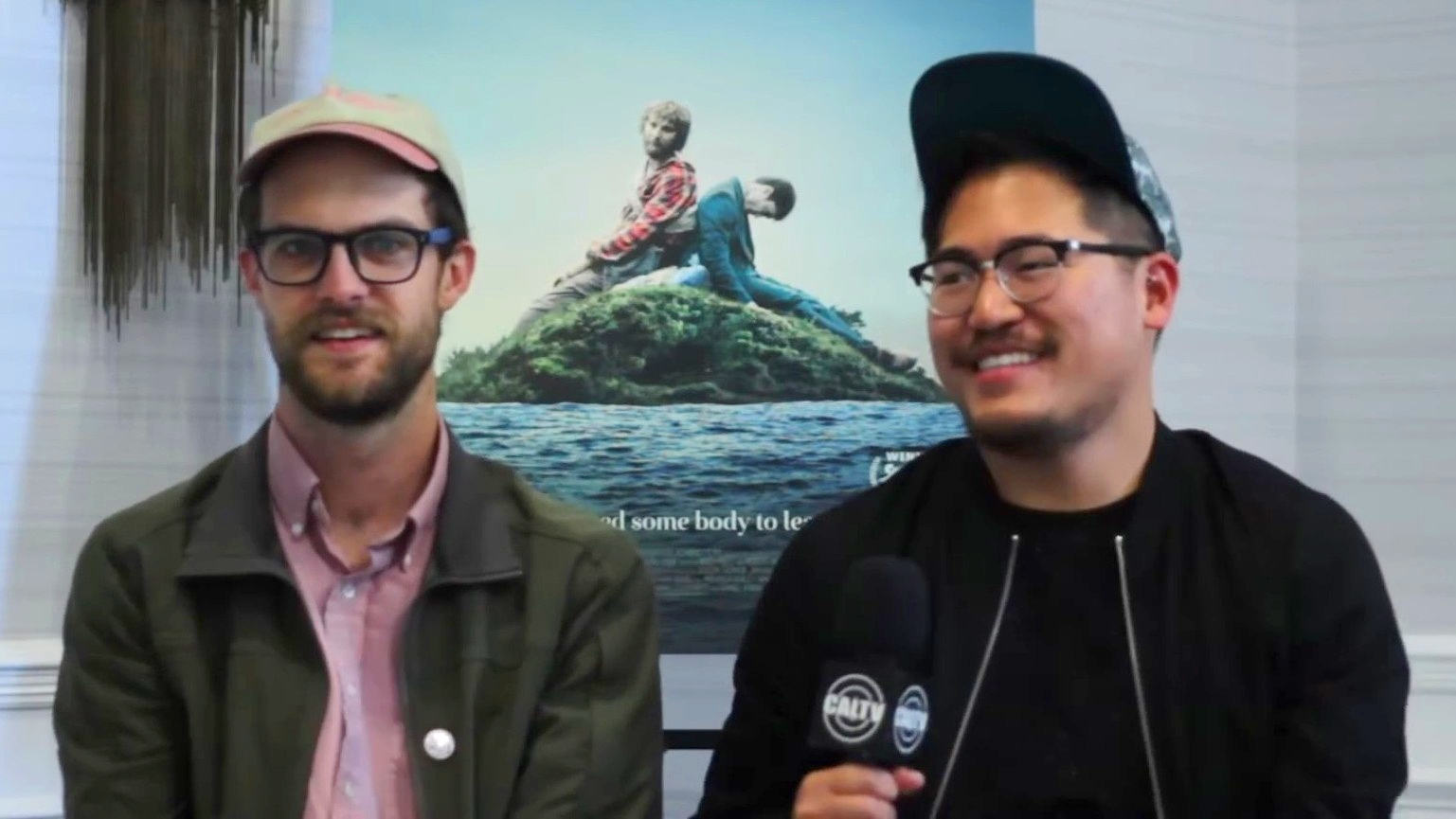
Daniels won for Everything Everywhere All at Once (2022).

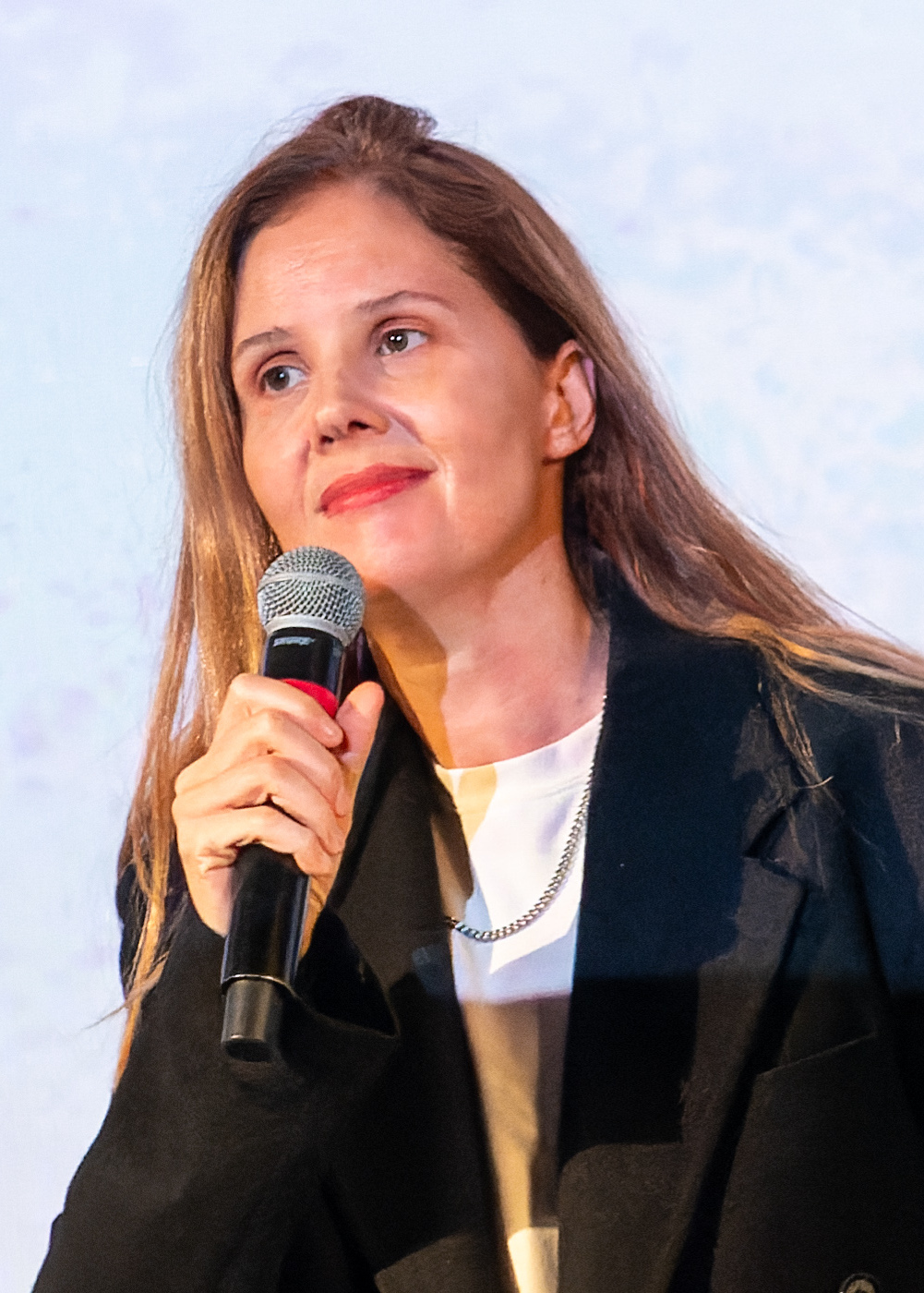
Justine Triet co-won for Anatomy of a Fall (2023).

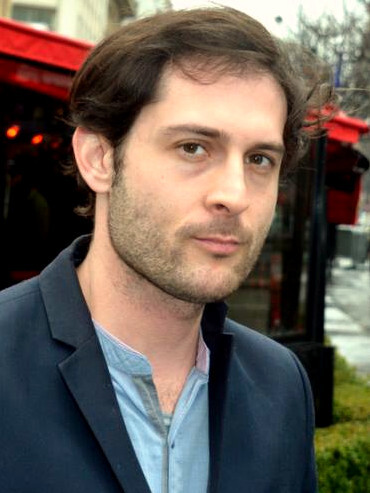
Arthur Harari co-won for Anatomy of a Fall (2023).

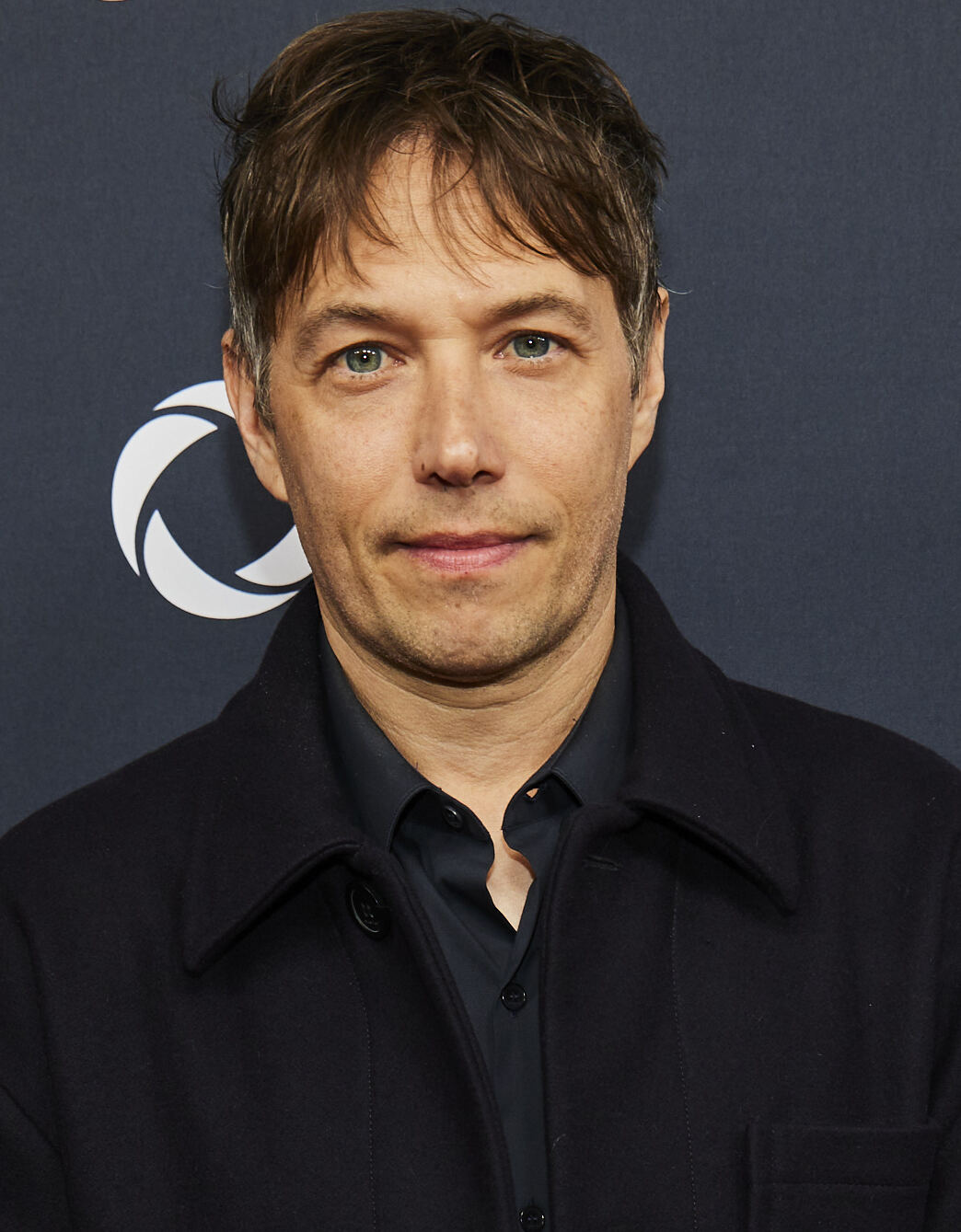
Sean Baker won for Anora (2024).

=== 1940s ===
Year	Film	Nominee
1940 (13th)	The Great McGinty	Preston Sturges
1940 (13th)	Angels Over Broadway	Ben Hecht
1940 (13th)	Dr. Ehrlich's Magic Bullet	Norman Burnside, Heinz Herald & John Huston
1940 (13th)	Foreign Correspondent	Charles Bennett & Joan Harrison
1940 (13th)	The Great Dictator	Charlie Chaplin
1941 (14th)	Citizen Kane	Herman J. Mankiewicz & Orson Welles
1941 (14th)	The Devil and Miss Jones	Norman Krasna
1941 (14th)	Sergeant York	Harry Chandlee, Abem Finkel, John Huston & Howard Koch
1941 (14th)	Tall, Dark and Handsome	Karl Tunberg & Darrell Ware
1941 (14th)	Tom, Dick and Harry	Paul Jarrico
1942 (15th)	Woman of the Year	Ring Lardner Jr. & Michael Kanin
1942 (15th)	One of Our Aircraft Is Missing	Michael Powell & Emeric Pressburger
1942 (15th)	Road to Morocco	Frank Butler & Don Hartman
1942 (15th)	Wake Island	W. R. Burnett & Frank Butler
1942 (15th)	The War Against Mrs. Hadley	George Oppenheimer
1943 (16th)	Princess O'Rourke	Norman Krasna
1943 (16th)	Air Force	Dudley Nichols
1943 (16th)	In Which We Serve	Noël Coward
1943 (16th)	The North Star	Lillian Hellman
1943 (16th)	So Proudly We Hail!	Allan Scott
1944 (17th)	Wilson	Lamar Trotti
1944 (17th)	Hail the Conquering Hero	Preston Sturges
1944 (17th)	The Miracle of Morgan's Creek	Preston Sturges
1944 (17th)	Two Girls and a Sailor	Richard Connell & Gladys Lehman
1944 (17th)	Wing and a Prayer	Jerome Cady
1945 (18th)	Marie-Louise	Richard Schweizer
1945 (18th)	Dillinger	Philip Yordan
1945 (18th)	Music for Millions	Myles Connolly
1945 (18th)	Salty O'Rourke	Milton Holmes
1945 (18th)	What Next, Corporal Hargrove?	Harry Kurnitz
1946 (19th)	The Seventh Veil	Muriel & Sydney Box
1946 (19th)	The Blue Dahlia	Raymond Chandler
1946 (19th)	Children of Paradise	Jacques Prévert
1946 (19th)	Notorious	Ben Hecht
1946 (19th)	Road to Utopia	Melvin Frank & Norman Panama
1947 (20th)	The Bachelor and the Bobby-Soxer	Sidney Sheldon
1947 (20th)	Body and Soul	Abraham Polonsky
1947 (20th)	A Double Life	Ruth Gordon & Garson Kanin
1947 (20th)	Monsieur Verdoux	Charlie Chaplin
1947 (20th)	Shoeshine	Sergio Amidei, Adolfo Franci, Cesare Giulio Viola & Cesare Zavattini
1948 (21st)	N/A (Note: Best Original Screenplay was consolidated in 1948 for a singular Best Screenplay award. The winner was The Treasure of the Sierra Madre, adapted from the novel of same name.)	—
1949 (22nd)	Battleground	Robert Pirosh
1949 (22nd)	Jolson Sings Again	Sidney Buchman
1949 (22nd)	Paisan	Sergio Amidei, Federico Fellini, Alfred Hayes, Marcello Pagliero & Roberto Rossellini
1949 (22nd)	Passport to Pimlico	T. E. B. Clarke
1949 (22nd)	The Quiet One	Helen Levitt, Janice Loeb & Sidney Meyers

=== 1950s ===
Year	Film	Nominees
1950 (23rd)	Sunset Boulevard	Charles Brackett, D. M. Marshman Jr. & Billy Wilder
1950 (23rd)	Adam's Rib	Ruth Gordon & Garson Kanin
1950 (23rd)	Caged	Virginia Kellogg & Bernard C. Schoenfeld
1950 (23rd)	The Men	Carl Foreman
1950 (23rd)	No Way Out	Joseph L. Mankiewicz & Lesser Samuels
1951 (24th)	An American in Paris	Alan Jay Lerner
1951 (24th)	Ace in the Hole	Walter Newman, Lesser Samuels & Billy Wilder
1951 (24th)	David and Bathsheba	Philip Dunne
1951 (24th)	Go for Broke!	Robert Pirosh
1951 (24th)	The Well	Clarence Greene & Russell Rouse
1952 (25th)	The Lavender Hill Mob	T. E. B. Clarke
1952 (25th)	The Atomic City	Sydney Boehm
1952 (25th)	Breaking the Sound Barrier	Terence Rattigan
1952 (25th)	Pat and Mike	Ruth Gordon & Garson Kanin
1952 (25th)	Viva Zapata!	John Steinbeck
1953 (26th)	Titanic	Charles Brackett, Richard L. Breen & Walter Reisch
1953 (26th)	The Band Wagon	Betty Comden & Adolph Green
1953 (26th)	The Desert Rats	Richard Murphy
1953 (26th)	The Naked Spur	Harold Jack Bloom & Sam Rolfe
1953 (26th)	Take the High Ground!	Millard Kaufman
1954 (27th)	On the Waterfront	Budd Schulberg
1954 (27th)	The Barefoot Contessa	Joseph L. Mankiewicz
1954 (27th)	Genevieve	William Rose
1954 (27th)	The Glenn Miller Story	Oscar Brodney & Valentine Davies
1954 (27th)	Knock on Wood	Melvin Frank & Norman Panama
1955 (28th)	Interrupted Melody	Sonya Levien & William Ludwig
1955 (28th)	The Court-Martial of Billy Mitchell	Emmet Lavery & Milton Sperling
1955 (28th)	It's Always Fair Weather	Betty Comden & Adolph Green
1955 (28th)	Mr. Hulot's Holiday	Henri Marquet & Jacques Tati
1955 (28th)	The Seven Little Foys	Melville Shavelson & Jack Rose
1956 (29th)	The Red Balloon	Albert Lamorisse
1956 (29th)	The Bold and the Brave	Robert Lewin
1956 (29th)	Julie	Andrew L. Stone
1956 (29th)	La Strada	Federico Fellini & Tullio Pinelli
1956 (29th)	The Ladykillers	William Rose
1957 (30th)	Designing Woman	George Wells
1957 (30th)	Funny Face	Leonard Gershe
1957 (30th)	Man of a Thousand Faces	Screenplay: Robert Campbell, Ivan Goff & Ben Roberts; Story: Ralph Wheelwright
1957 (30th)	The Tin Star	Screenplay: Dudley Nichols; Story: Joel Kane & Barney Slater
1957 (30th)	I Vitelloni	Screenplay: Federico Fellini & Ennio Flaiano; Story: Fellini, Flaiano & Tullio Pinelli
1958 (31st)	The Defiant Ones	Nedrick Young & Harold Jacob Smith (Note: In 1958, Nedrick Young was blacklisted and writing under the pseudonym Nathan E. Douglas. The Academy's Board of Governors voted in 1993 to restore Young's nomination and award.)
1958 (31st)	The Goddess	Paddy Chayefsky
1958 (31st)	Houseboat	Melville Shavelson & Jack Rose
1958 (31st)	The Sheepman	Screenplay: William Bowers & James Edward Grant; Story: Grant
1958 (31st)	Teacher's Pet	Fay Kanin & Michael Kanin
1959 (32nd)	Pillow Talk	Screenplay: Stanley Shapiro & Maurice Richlin; Story: Clarence Greene & Russell Rouse
1959 (32nd)	The 400 Blows	Marcel Moussy & François Truffaut
1959 (32nd)	North by Northwest	Ernest Lehman
1959 (32nd)	Operation Petticoat	Screenplay: Shapiro & Richlin; Story: Paul King & Joseph Stone
1959 (32nd)	Wild Strawberries	Ingmar Bergman

=== 1960s ===
Year	Film	Nominees
1960 (33rd)	The Apartment	I. A. L. Diamond & Billy Wilder
1960 (33rd)	The Angry Silence	Screenplay: Bryan Forbes; Story: Michael Craig & Richard Gregson
1960 (33rd)	The Facts of Life	Melvin Frank & Norman Panama
1960 (33rd)	Hiroshima, Mon Amour	Marguerite Duras
1960 (33rd)	Never on Sunday	Jules Dassin
1961 (34th)	Splendor in the Grass	William Inge
1961 (34th)	Ballad of a Soldier	Grigory Chukhray & Valentin Yezhov
1961 (34th)	General Della Rovere	Sergio Amidei, Diego Fabbi & Indro Montanelli
1961 (34th)	La Dolce Vita	Federico Fellini, Ennio Flaiano, Tullio Pinelli & Brunello Rondi
1961 (34th)	Lover Come Back	Paul Henning & Stanley Shapiro
1962 (35th)	Divorce Italian Style	Ennio De Concini, Pietro Germi & Alfredo Giannetti
1962 (35th)	Freud	Screenplay: Charles Kaufman & Wolfgang Reinhardt; Story: Kaufman
1962 (35th)	Last Year at Marienbad	Alain Robbe-Grillet
1962 (35th)	That Touch of Mink	Nate Monaster & Stanley Shapiro
1962 (35th)	Through a Glass Darkly	Ingmar Bergman
1963 (36th)	How the West Was Won	James R. Webb
1963 (36th)	America America	Elia Kazan
1963 (36th)	8½	Federico Fellini, Ennio Flaiano, Tullio Pinelli & Brunello Rondi
1963 (36th)	The Four Days of Naples	Screenplay: Carlo Bernari, Pasquale Festa Campanile, Massimo Franciosa & Nanni Loy; Story: Campanile, Franciosa, Loy & Vasco Pratolini
1963 (36th)	Love with the Proper Stranger	Arnold Schulman
1964 (37th)	Father Goose	Screenplay: Peter Stone & Frank Tarloff; Story: S. H. Barnett
1964 (37th)	A Hard Day's Night	Alun Owen
1964 (37th)	One Potato, Two Potato	Screenplay: Orville H. Hampton; Story: Raphael Hayes
1964 (37th)	The Organizer	Age, Mario Monicelli & Furio Scarpelli
1964 (37th)	That Man from Rio	Daniel Boulanger, Philippe de Broca, Ariane Mnouchkine & Jean-Paul Rappeneau
1965 (38th)	Darling	Frederic Raphael
1965 (38th)	Casanova 70	Age, Suso Cecchi d'Amico, Tonino Guerra, Mario Monicelli, Giorgio Salvioni & Furio Scarpelli
1965 (38th)	Those Magnificent Men in Their Flying Machines	Ken Annakin & Jack Davies
1965 (38th)	The Train	Franklin Coen & Frank Davis
1965 (38th)	The Umbrellas of Cherbourg	Jacques Demy
1966 (39th)	A Man and a Woman	Screenplay: Claude Lelouch & Pierre Uytterhoeven; Story: Lelouch
1966 (39th)	Blowup	Screenplay: Michelangelo Antonioni, Edward Bond & Tonino Guerra; Story: Antonioni
1966 (39th)	The Fortune Cookie	I. A. L. Diamond & Billy Wilder
1966 (39th)	Khartoum	Robert Ardrey
1966 (39th)	The Naked Prey	Clint Johnston & Don Peters
1967 (40th)	Guess Who's Coming to Dinner	William Rose
1967 (40th)	Bonnie and Clyde	Robert Benton & David Newman
1967 (40th)	Divorce American Style	Screenplay: Norman Lear; Story: Robert Kaufman
1967 (40th)	La Guerre Est Finie	Jorge Semprún
1967 (40th)	Two for the Road	Frederic Raphael
1968 (41st)	The Producers	Mel Brooks
1968 (41st)	The Battle of Algiers	Gillo Pontecorvo & Franco Solinas
1968 (41st)	Faces	John Cassavetes
1968 (41st)	Hot Millions	Peter Ustinov & Ira Wallach
1968 (41st)	2001: A Space Odyssey	Arthur C. Clarke & Stanley Kubrick
1969 (42nd)	Butch Cassidy and the Sundance Kid	William Goldman
1969 (42nd)	Bob & Carol & Ted & Alice	Paul Mazursky & Larry Tucker
1969 (42nd)	The Damned	Screenplay: Nicola Badalucco, Enrico Medioli & Luchino Visconti; Story: Badalucco
1969 (42nd)	Easy Rider	Peter Fonda, Dennis Hopper & Terry Southern
1969 (42nd)	The Wild Bunch	Screenplay: Walon Green & Sam Peckinpah; Story: Green & Roy N. Sickner

=== 1970s ===
Year	Film	Nominees
1970 (43rd)	Patton	Francis Ford Coppola & Edmund H. North
1970 (43rd)	Five Easy Pieces	Screenplay: Carole Eastman; Story: Eastman & Bob Rafelson
1970 (43rd)	Joe	Norman Wexler
1970 (43rd)	Love Story	Erich Segal
1970 (43rd)	My Night at Maud's	Éric Rohmer
1971 (44th)	The Hospital	Paddy Chayefsky
1971 (44th)	Investigation of a Citizen Above Suspicion	Elio Petri & Ugo Pirro
1971 (44th)	Klute	Andy & David Lewis
1971 (44th)	Summer of '42	Herman Raucher
1971 (44th)	Sunday Bloody Sunday	Penelope Gilliatt
1972 (45th)	The Candidate	Jeremy Larner
1972 (45th)	The Discreet Charm of the Bourgeoisie	Screenplay & Story: Luis Buñuel; Collaboration: Jean-Claude Carrière
1972 (45th)	Lady Sings the Blues	Chris Clark, Suzanne de Passe & Terrence McCloy
1972 (45th)	Murmur of the Heart	Louis Malle
1972 (45th)	Young Winston	Carl Foreman
1973 (46th)	The Sting	David S. Ward
1973 (46th)	American Graffiti	Willard Huyck, George Lucas & Gloria Katz
1973 (46th)	Cries and Whispers	Ingmar Bergman
1973 (46th)	Save the Tiger	Steve Shagan
1973 (46th)	A Touch of Class	Melvin Frank & Jack Rose
1974 (47th)	Chinatown	Robert Towne
1974 (47th)	Alice Doesn't Live Here Anymore	Robert Getchell
1974 (47th)	The Conversation	Francis Ford Coppola
1974 (47th)	Day for Night	Jean-Louis Richard, Suzanne Schiffman & François Truffaut
1974 (47th)	Harry and Tonto	Josh Greenfeld & Paul Mazursky
1975 (48th)	Dog Day Afternoon	Frank Pierson
1975 (48th)	Amarcord	Federico Fellini & Tonino Guerra
1975 (48th)	And Now My Love	Claude Lelouch & Pierre Uytterhoeven
1975 (48th)	Lies My Father Told Me	Ted Allan
1975 (48th)	Shampoo	Robert Towne & Warren Beatty
1976 (49th)	Network	Paddy Chayefsky
1976 (49th)	Cousin Cousine	Screenplay & Story: Jean-Charles Tacchella; Adaptation: Daniele Thompson
1976 (49th)	The Front	Walter Bernstein
1976 (49th)	Rocky	Sylvester Stallone
1976 (49th)	Seven Beauties	Lina Wertmüller
1977 (50th)	Annie Hall	Woody Allen & Marshall Brickman
1977 (50th)	The Goodbye Girl	Neil Simon
1977 (50th)	The Late Show	Robert Benton
1977 (50th)	Star Wars	George Lucas
1977 (50th)	The Turning Point	Arthur Laurents
1978 (51st)	Coming Home	Screenplay: Robert C. Jones & Waldo Salt; Story: Nancy Dowd
1978 (51st)	Autumn Sonata	Ingmar Bergman
1978 (51st)	The Deer Hunter	Screenplay: Deric Washburn; Story: Michael Cimino, Louis Garfinkle, Quinn Redeker & Washburn
1978 (51st)	Interiors	Woody Allen
1978 (51st)	An Unmarried Woman	Paul Mazursky
1979 (52nd)	Breaking Away	Steve Tesich
1979 (52nd)	All That Jazz	Robert Alan Aurthur & Bob Fosse
1979 (52nd)	...And Justice for All.	Valerie Curtin & Barry Levinson
1979 (52nd)	The China Syndrome	James Bridges, T. S. Cook & Mike Gray
1979 (52nd)	Manhattan	Woody Allen & Marshall Brickman

=== 1980s ===
Year	Film	Nominees
1980 (53rd)	Melvin and Howard	Bo Goldman
1980 (53rd)	Brubaker	Screenplay: W. D. Richter; Story: Richter & Arthur A. Ross
1980 (53rd)	Fame	Christopher Gore
1980 (53rd)	Mon oncle d'Amérique	Jean Gruault
1980 (53rd)	Private Benjamin	Nancy Meyers, Harvey Miller & Charles Shyer
1981 (54th)	Chariots of Fire	Colin Welland
1981 (54th)	Absence of Malice	Kurt Luedtke
1981 (54th)	Arthur	Steve Gordon
1981 (54th)	Atlantic City	John Guare
1981 (54th)	Reds	Trevor Griffiths & Warren Beatty
1982 (55th)	Gandhi	John Briley
1982 (55th)	Diner	Barry Levinson
1982 (55th)	E.T. the Extra-Terrestrial	Melissa Mathison
1982 (55th)	An Officer and a Gentleman	Douglas Day Stewart
1982 (55th)	Tootsie	Screenplay: Larry Gelbart & Murray Schisgal; Story: Gelbart & Don McGuire
1983 (56th)	Tender Mercies	Horton Foote
1983 (56th)	The Big Chill	Barbara Benedek & Lawrence Kasdan
1983 (56th)	Fanny and Alexander	Ingmar Bergman
1983 (56th)	Silkwood	Alice Arlen & Nora Ephron
1983 (56th)	WarGames	Lawrence Lasker & Walter Parkes
1984 (57th)	Places in the Heart	Robert Benton
1984 (57th)	Beverly Hills Cop	Screenplay: Daniel Petrie Jr.; Story: Danilo Bach & Petrie
1984 (57th)	Broadway Danny Rose	Woody Allen
1984 (57th)	El Norte	Gregory Nava & Anna Thomas
1984 (57th)	Splash	Screenplay: Bruce Jay Friedman, Lowell Ganz & Babaloo Mandel; Story: Friedman & Brian Grazer
1985 (58th)	Witness	Screenplay: William Kelley & Earl W. Wallace; Story: Kelley, E. Wallace & Pamela Wallace
1985 (58th)	Back to the Future	Bob Gale & Robert Zemeckis
1985 (58th)	Brazil	Terry Gilliam, Charles McKeown & Tom Stoppard
1985 (58th)	The Official Story	Aída Bortnik & Luis Puenzo
1985 (58th)	The Purple Rose of Cairo	Woody Allen
1986 (59th)	Hannah and Her Sisters	Woody Allen
1986 (59th)	Crocodile Dundee	Screenplay: John Cornell, Paul Hogan & Ken Shadie; Story: Hogan
1986 (59th)	My Beautiful Laundrette	Hanif Kureishi
1986 (59th)	Platoon	Oliver Stone
1986 (59th)	Salvador	Richard Boyle & Stone
1987 (60th)	Moonstruck	John Patrick Shanley
1987 (60th)	Au Revoir Les Enfants (Goodbye, Children)	Louis Malle
1987 (60th)	Broadcast News	James L. Brooks
1987 (60th)	Hope and Glory	John Boorman
1987 (60th)	Radio Days	Woody Allen
1988 (61st)	Rain Man	Screenplay: Ronald Bass & Barry Morrow; Story: Morrow
1988 (61st)	Big	Gary Ross & Anne Spielberg
1988 (61st)	Bull Durham	Ron Shelton
1988 (61st)	A Fish Called Wanda	Screenplay: John Cleese; Story: Cleese & Charles Crichton
1988 (61st)	Running on Empty	Naomi Foner Gyllenhaal
1989 (62nd)	Dead Poets Society	Tom Schulman
1989 (62nd)	Crimes and Misdemeanors	Woody Allen
1989 (62nd)	Do the Right Thing	Spike Lee
1989 (62nd)	Sex, Lies, and Videotape	Steven Soderbergh
1989 (62nd)	When Harry Met Sally...	Nora Ephron

=== 1990s ===
Year	Film	Nominees
1990 (63rd)	Ghost	Bruce Joel Rubin
1990 (63rd)	Alice	Woody Allen
1990 (63rd)	Avalon	Barry Levinson
1990 (63rd)	Green Card	Peter Weir
1990 (63rd)	Metropolitan	Whit Stillman
1991 (64th)	Thelma & Louise	Callie Khouri
1991 (64th)	Boyz n the Hood	John Singleton
1991 (64th)	Bugsy	James Toback
1991 (64th)	The Fisher King	Richard LaGravenese
1991 (64th)	Grand Canyon	Lawrence Kasdan & Meg Kasdan
1992 (65th)	The Crying Game	Neil Jordan
1992 (65th)	Husbands and Wives	Woody Allen
1992 (65th)	Lorenzo's Oil	Nick Enright & George Miller
1992 (65th)	Passion Fish	John Sayles
1992 (65th)	Unforgiven	David Peoples
1993 (66th)	The Piano	Jane Campion
1993 (66th)	Dave	Gary Ross
1993 (66th)	In the Line of Fire	Jeff Maguire
1993 (66th)	Philadelphia	Ron Nyswaner
1993 (66th)	Sleepless in Seattle	Screenplay: Jeff Arch, Nora Ephron & David S. Ward; Story: Arch
1994 (67th)	Pulp Fiction	Screenplay: Quentin Tarantino; Story: Roger Avary & Tarantino
1994 (67th)	Bullets Over Broadway	Woody Allen & Douglas McGrath
1994 (67th)	Four Weddings and a Funeral	Richard Curtis
1994 (67th)	Heavenly Creatures	Peter Jackson & Frances Walsh
1994 (67th)	Three Colours: Red	Krzysztof Kieślowski & Krzysztof Piesiewicz
1995 (68th)	The Usual Suspects	Christopher McQuarrie
1995 (68th)	Braveheart	Randall Wallace
1995 (68th)	Mighty Aphrodite	Woody Allen
1995 (68th)	Nixon	Stephen J. Rivele, Oliver Stone & Christopher Wilkinson
1995 (68th)	Toy Story	Screenplay: Joel Cohen, Alec Sokolow, Andrew Stanton & Joss Whedon; Story: Pete Docter, John Lasseter, Joe Ranft & Stanton
1996 (69th)	Fargo	Coen Brothers
1996 (69th)	Jerry Maguire	Cameron Crowe
1996 (69th)	Lone Star	John Sayles
1996 (69th)	Secrets & Lies	Mike Leigh
1996 (69th)	Shine	Screenplay: Jan Sardi; Story: Scott Hicks
1997 (70th)	Good Will Hunting	Ben Affleck & Matt Damon
1997 (70th)	As Good as It Gets	Screenplay: Mark Andrus & James L. Brooks; Story: Andrus
1997 (70th)	Boogie Nights	Paul Thomas Anderson
1997 (70th)	Deconstructing Harry	Woody Allen
1997 (70th)	The Full Monty	Simon Beaufoy
1998 (71st)	Shakespeare in Love	Marc Norman & Tom Stoppard
1998 (71st)	Bulworth	Screenplay: Warren Beatty & Jeremy Pikser; Story: Beatty
1998 (71st)	Life Is Beautiful	Roberto Benigni & Vincenzo Cerami
1998 (71st)	Saving Private Ryan	Robert Rodat
1998 (71st)	The Truman Show	Andrew Niccol
1999 (72nd)	American Beauty	Alan Ball
1999 (72nd)	Being John Malkovich	Charlie Kaufman
1999 (72nd)	Magnolia	Paul Thomas Anderson
1999 (72nd)	The Sixth Sense	M. Night Shyamalan
1999 (72nd)	Topsy-Turvy	Mike Leigh

=== 2000s ===
Year	Film	Nominees
2000 (73rd)	Almost Famous	Cameron Crowe
2000 (73rd)	Billy Elliot	Lee Hall
2000 (73rd)	Erin Brockovich	Susannah Grant
2000 (73rd)	Gladiator	Screenplay: David Franzoni, John Logan & William Nicholson; Story: Franzoni
2000 (73rd)	You Can Count on Me	Kenneth Lonergan
2001 (74th)	Gosford Park	Julian Fellowes
2001 (74th)	Amélie	Screenplay: Jean-Pierre Jeunet & Guillaume Laurant; Dialogue: Laurant
2001 (74th)	Memento	Screenplay: Christopher Nolan; Story: Jonathan Nolan
2001 (74th)	Monster's Ball	Milo Addica & Will Rokos
2001 (74th)	The Royal Tenenbaums	Wes Anderson & Owen Wilson
2002 (75th)	Talk to Her	Pedro Almodóvar
2002 (75th)	Far from Heaven	Todd Haynes
2002 (75th)	Gangs of New York	Screenplay: Jay Cocks, Kenneth Lonergan & Steven Zaillian; Story: Cocks
2002 (75th)	My Big Fat Greek Wedding	Nia Vardalos
2002 (75th)	Y Tu Mamá También	Alfonso & Carlos Cuarón
2003 (76th)	Lost in Translation	Sofia Coppola
2003 (76th)	The Barbarian Invasions	Denys Arcand
2003 (76th)	Dirty Pretty Things	Steven Knight
2003 (76th)	Finding Nemo	Screenplay: Bob Peterson, David Reynolds & Andrew Stanton; Story: Stanton
2003 (76th)	In America	Jim, Kirsten & Naomi Sheridan
2004 (77th)	Eternal Sunshine of the Spotless Mind	Screenplay: Charlie Kaufman; Story: Pierre Bismuth, Michel Gondry & Kaufman
2004 (77th)	The Aviator	John Logan
2004 (77th)	Hotel Rwanda	Terry George & Keir Pearson
2004 (77th)	The Incredibles	Brad Bird
2004 (77th)	Vera Drake	Mike Leigh
2005 (78th)	Crash	Screenplay: Paul Haggis & Bobby Moresco; Story: Haggis
2005 (78th)	Good Night, and Good Luck	George Clooney & Grant Heslov
2005 (78th)	Match Point	Woody Allen
2005 (78th)	The Squid and the Whale	Noah Baumbach
2005 (78th)	Syriana	Stephen Gaghan
2006 (79th)	Little Miss Sunshine	Michael Arndt
2006 (79th)	Babel	Guillermo Arriaga
2006 (79th)	Letters from Iwo Jima	Screenplay: Iris Yamashita; Story: Yamashita & Paul Haggis
2006 (79th)	Pan's Labyrinth	Guillermo del Toro
2006 (79th)	The Queen	Peter Morgan
2007 (80th)	Juno	Diablo Cody
2007 (80th)	Lars and the Real Girl	Nancy Oliver
2007 (80th)	Michael Clayton	Tony Gilroy
2007 (80th)	Ratatouille	Screenplay: Brad Bird; Story: Jan Pinkava, Jim Capobianco & Bird
2007 (80th)	The Savages	Tamara Jenkins
2008 (81st)	Milk	Dustin Lance Black
2008 (81st)	Frozen River	Courtney Hunt
2008 (81st)	Happy-Go-Lucky	Mike Leigh
2008 (81st)	In Bruges	Martin McDonagh
2008 (81st)	WALL-E	Screenplay: Andrew Stanton & Jim Reardon; Original story: Stanton & Pete Docter
2009 (82nd)	The Hurt Locker	Mark Boal
2009 (82nd)	Inglourious Basterds	Quentin Tarantino
2009 (82nd)	The Messenger	Alessandro Camon & Oren Moverman
2009 (82nd)	A Serious Man	Coen Brothers
2009 (82nd)	Up	Screenplay: Bob Peterson & Pete Docter; Story: Docter, Peterson & Tom McCarthy

=== 2010s ===
Year	Film	Nominees
2010 (83rd)	The King's Speech	David Seidler
2010 (83rd)	Another Year	Mike Leigh
2010 (83rd)	The Fighter	Screenplay: Scott Silver and Paul Tamasy & Eric Johnson; Story: Keith Dorrington, Tamasy & Johnson
2010 (83rd)	Inception	Christopher Nolan
2010 (83rd)	The Kids Are All Right	Lisa Cholodenko & Stuart Blumberg
2011 (84th)	Midnight in Paris	Woody Allen
2011 (84th)	The Artist	Michel Hazanavicius
2011 (84th)	Bridesmaids	Annie Mumolo & Kristen Wiig
2011 (84th)	Margin Call	J. C. Chandor
2011 (84th)	A Separation	Asghar Farhadi
2012 (85th)	Django Unchained	Quentin Tarantino
2012 (85th)	Amour	Michael Haneke
2012 (85th)	Flight	John Gatins
2012 (85th)	Moonrise Kingdom	Wes Anderson & Roman Coppola
2012 (85th)	Zero Dark Thirty	Mark Boal
2013 (86th)	Her	Spike Jonze
2013 (86th)	American Hustle	Eric Warren Singer & David O. Russell
2013 (86th)	Blue Jasmine	Woody Allen
2013 (86th)	Dallas Buyers Club	Craig Borten & Melisa Wallack
2013 (86th)	Nebraska	Bob Nelson
2014 (87th)	Birdman	Alejandro G. Iñárritu, Nicolás Giacobone, Alexander Dinelaris Jr. & Armando Bo
2014 (87th)	Boyhood	Richard Linklater
2014 (87th)	Foxcatcher	E. Max Frye & Dan Futterman
2014 (87th)	The Grand Budapest Hotel	Screenplay: Wes Anderson; Story: Anderson & Hugo Guinness
2014 (87th)	Nightcrawler	Dan Gilroy
2015 (88th)	Spotlight	Josh Singer & Tom McCarthy
2015 (88th)	Bridge of Spies	Matt Charman & Coen Brothers
2015 (88th)	Ex Machina	Alex Garland
2015 (88th)	Inside Out	Screenplay: Pete Docter, Meg LeFauve & Josh Cooley; Original story: Docter & Ronnie del Carmen
2015 (88th)	Straight Outta Compton	Screenplay: Jonathan Herman & Andrea Berloff; Story: S. Leigh Savidge & Alan Wenkus and Berloff
2016 (89th)	Manchester by the Sea	Kenneth Lonergan
2016 (89th)	Hell or High Water	Taylor Sheridan
2016 (89th)	La La Land	Damien Chazelle
2016 (89th)	The Lobster	Yorgos Lanthimos & Efthymis Filippou
2016 (89th)	20th Century Women	Mike Mills
2017 (90th)	Get Out	Jordan Peele
2017 (90th)	The Big Sick	Emily V. Gordon & Kumail Nanjiani
2017 (90th)	Lady Bird	Greta Gerwig
2017 (90th)	The Shape of Water	Screenplay: Guillermo del Toro & Vanessa Taylor; Story: del Toro
2017 (90th)	Three Billboards Outside Ebbing, Missouri	Martin McDonagh
2018 (91st)	Green Book	Nick Vallelonga, Brian Currie & Peter Farrelly
2018 (91st)	The Favourite	Deborah Davis & Tony McNamara
2018 (91st)	First Reformed	Paul Schrader
2018 (91st)	Roma	Alfonso Cuarón
2018 (91st)	Vice	Adam McKay
2019 (92nd)	Parasite	Screenplay: Bong Joon-ho & Han Jin-won; Story: Bong
2019 (92nd)	Knives Out	Rian Johnson
2019 (92nd)	Marriage Story	Noah Baumbach
2019 (92nd)	1917	Sam Mendes & Krysty Wilson-Cairns
2019 (92nd)	Once Upon a Time in Hollywood	Quentin Tarantino

=== 2020s ===
Year	Film	Nominees
2020/21 (93rd) (Note: The eligibility period for the 93rd ceremony was extended through to February 28, 2021, due to the impact of the COVID-19 pandemic.)	Promising Young Woman	Emerald Fennell
2020/21 (93rd)	Judas and the Black Messiah	Screenplay: Will Berson & Shaka King; Story: Berson & King and Kenny Lucas & Keith Lucas
2020/21 (93rd)	Minari	Lee Isaac Chung
2020/21 (93rd)	Sound of Metal	Screenplay: Darius Marder & Abraham Marder; Story: D. Marder & Derek Cianfrance
2020/21 (93rd)	The Trial of the Chicago 7	Aaron Sorkin
2021 (94th)	Belfast	Kenneth Branagh
2021 (94th)	Don't Look Up	Screenplay: Adam McKay; Story: McKay & David Sirota
2021 (94th)	King Richard	Zach Baylin
2021 (94th)	Licorice Pizza	Paul Thomas Anderson
2021 (94th)	The Worst Person in the World	Eskil Vogt & Joachim Trier
2022 (95th)	Everything Everywhere All at Once	Daniel Kwan and Daniel Scheinert
2022 (95th)	The Banshees of Inisherin	Martin McDonagh
2022 (95th)	The Fabelmans	Steven Spielberg & Tony Kushner
2022 (95th)	Tár	Todd Field
2022 (95th)	Triangle of Sadness	Ruben Östlund
2023 (96th)	Anatomy of a Fall	Justine Triet & Arthur Harari
2023 (96th)	The Holdovers	David Hemingson
2023 (96th)	Maestro	Bradley Cooper & Josh Singer
2023 (96th)	May December	Screenplay: Samy Burch; Story: Burch & Alex Mechanik
2023 (96th)	Past Lives	Celine Song
2024 (97th)	Anora	Sean Baker
2024 (97th)	The Brutalist	Brady Corbet & Mona Fastvold
2024 (97th)	A Real Pain	Jesse Eisenberg
2024 (97th)	September 5	Moritz Binder, Alex David & Tim Fehlbaum
2024 (97th)	The Substance	Coralie Fargeat
2025 (98th)	Sinners	Ryan Coogler
2025 (98th)	Blue Moon	Robert Kaplow
2025 (98th)	It Was Just an Accident	Jafar Panahi, in collaboration with Mehdi Mahmoudian, Shadmehr Rastin & Nader Saïvar
2025 (98th)	Marty Supreme	Ronald Bronstein & Josh Safdie
2025 (98th)	Sentimental Value	Joachim Trier & Eskil Vogt

== Multiple wins and nominations ==
=== Multiple wins ===
Wins	Screenwriter
3
3	Woody Allen
2
2	Charles Brackett
2	Paddy Chayefsky
2	Quentin Tarantino
2	Billy Wilder

=== Multiple nominations ===
Nominations	Screenwriter
16	Woody Allen
6	Federico Fellini
5	Ingmar Bergman
5	Mike Leigh
4	Pete Docter
4	Melvin Frank
4	Tullio Pinelli
4	Stanley Shapiro
4	Quentin Tarantino
4	Billy Wilder
3	Sergio Amidei
3	Paul Thomas Anderson
3	Wes Anderson
3	Warren Beatty
3	Robert Benton
3	Paddy Chayefsky
3	Ethan Coen
3	Joel Coen
3	Nora Ephron
3	Ennio Flaiano
3	Ruth Gordon
3	Tonino Guerra
3	Garson Kanin
3	Barry Levinson
3	Kenneth Lonergan
3	Paul Mazursky
3	Martin McDonagh
3	Norman Panama
3	Jack Rose
3	William Rose
3	Andrew Stanton
3	Oliver Stone
3	Preston Sturges
2	Noah Baumbach
2	Brad Bird
2	Mark Boal
2	Charles Brackett
2	Marshall Brickman
2	James L. Brooks
2	Frank Butler
2	Charlie Chaplin
2	T. E. B. Clarke
2	Betty Comden
2	Francis Ford Coppola
2	Cameron Crowe
2	Alfonso Cuarón
2	Guillermo del Toro
2	I. A. L. Diamond
2	Carl Foreman
2	Adolph Green
2	Clarence Greene
2	Paul Haggis
2	Ben Hecht
2	John Huston
2	Agenore Incrocci
2	Michael Kanin
2	Lawrence Kasdan
2	Charlie Kaufman
2	Norman Krasna
2	Claude Lelouch
2	John Logan
2	George Lucas
2	Louis Malle
2	Joseph L. Mankiewicz
2	Tom McCarthy
2	Adam McKay
2	Mario Monicelli
2	Dudley Nichols
2	Christopher Nolan
2	Bob Peterson
2	Robert Pirosh
2	Frederic Raphael
2	Brunello Rondi
2	Gary Ross
2	Russell Rouse
2	John Sayles
2	Lesser Samuels
2	Furio Scarpelli
2	Melville Shavelson
2	Josh Singer
2	Tom Stoppard
2	Robert Towne
2	Joachim Trier
2	François Truffaut
2	Pierre Uytterhoeven
2	Eskil Vogt
2	David S. Ward

== Age superlatives ==
Record	Writer	Film	Age (in years)	Ref.
Oldest winner	Woody Allen	Midnight in Paris	76	
Oldest nominee	Charles Crichton	A Fish Called Wanda	78	
Youngest winner	Ben Affleck	Good Will Hunting	25	
Youngest nominee	John Singleton	Boyz n the Hood	24	

== See also ==
- Academy Award for Best Story
- Golden Globe Award for Best Screenplay
- BAFTA Award for Best Original Screenplay
- Independent Spirit Award for Best Screenplay
- Critics' Choice Movie Award for Best Screenplay
- List of Big Five Academy Award winners and nominees
- List of Academy Award–nominated films
- Writers Guild of America Award for Best Original Screenplay
