= List of Robert Benchley collections and film appearances =

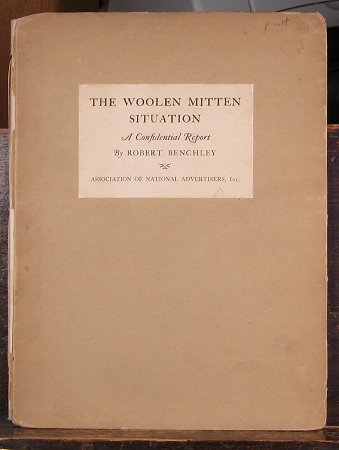
Robert Benchley The Woolen Mitten Situation (1926)

Humorist Robert Benchley (1889–1945) produced over 600 essays, initially compiled in over twelve volumes, during his writing career. He was also featured in a number of films, including 48 short treatments that he mostly wrote or co-wrote, and numerous feature films.

The following is a list of those compilations and appearances.

== Books ==
Benchley produced twelve compilation books of his work for the various publications he wrote and freelanced for, and numerous posthumous compilations of his work have been produced since his death. Unless otherwise indicated, all volumes featuring illustrations were drawn by Gluyas Williams.

=== Collections During His Lifetime ===
- Of All Things - Henry Holt & Company, 1921. 234p. - 22 essays by Robert Benchley published in Vanity Fair, The New York Tribune, Collier's Weekly, Life, and Motor Print.
- Love Conquers All - Henry Holt & Company, 1922. 310p. - 63 essays published in Life, The New York World, The New York Tribune, The Detroit Athletic Club News, and The Consolidated Press Association.
- Pluck And Luck - Henry Holt & Company, 1925. 295 p. - 50 essays published in Life, The Detroit Athletic Club News, The Bookman, College Humor, and The Theatre Guild Program.
- The Early Worm - Henry Holt & Company, 1927. 263p. - 47 essays published in Life, The Detroit Athletic Club News, The New Yorker, College Humor, and The Bell Syndicate.
- 20,000 Leagues under the Sea, or David Copperfield - Henry Holt & Company, 1928. 233p. - 40 essays by Robert Benchley published in The Bookman, The Detroit Athletic Club News, The Forum, Life, The New Yorker, and The Yale Review.
- The Treasurer's Report & Other Aspects of Community Singing - Harper and Brothers, 1930.
- No Poems, Or Around the World Backwards and Sideways - Harper and Brothers, 1932. 330p. - 45 essays.
- From Bed to Worse, or Comforting Thoughts about the Bison - Harper and Brothers, 1934. 286p. - 60 essays.
- My Ten Years in a Quandary, and How They Grew - Harper and Brothers, 1936. 361p - 105 essays.
- After 1903 - What? - Harper and Brothers, 1938.
- Inside Benchley - Harper and Brothers, 1942. 316p. - 50 previously published essays.
- Benchley Beside Himself - Harper and Brothers, 1943. 304p. - 47 previously published essays. Williams illustrations and still photos from Benchley's short films.

=== Book Prefaces, Introductions, and Forewords ===
- Ellison Hoover Cartoons From Life - Simon & Schuster, 1925.
- Justin Stafford Lucien Esty Ask Me Another! The Question Book - Viking Press, 1927.
- Gluyas Williams The Gluyas Williams Book - Doubleday, Doran, 1929.
- Peter Arno Peter Arno's Hullabaloo - Horace Liveright, 1930.
- The Fourth New Yorker Album - Doubleday, Doran, 1931.
- Dwight Fiske (and Dawn Powell) Without Music - The Chatham Press, 1933.
- S. J. Perelman Strictly From Hunger - Random House, 1937.
- Gluyas Williams Fellow Citizens - Doubleday, Doran, 1940.
- Morton Thompson Joe, The Wounded Tennis Player - Doubleday, Doran, 1945.

=== Posthumous ===
- Benchley--Or Else - Harper and Brothers, 1947. 273p - 71 essays, six of which were originally published in The New Yorker.
- Chips off the Old Benchley - Harper and Brothers, 1949. 360p. - Collection of 77 essays compiled by Gertrude Benchley, Robert's wife. Many of the illustrations were previously unpublished in book form.
- The "Reel" Benchley - A. A. Wyn, Inc., 1950. 96p - No Williams illustrations, instead consisting of stills and scripts from many of Benchley's short films.
- The Benchley Roundup - Harper and Brothers, 1954. 288p- A collection of essays, written between 1915 and 1945, edited by Nathaniel Benchley
- Benchley Lost and Found: Thirty-Nine Prodigal Pieces - Dover Publications, 1970. 183p.
- The Benchley Omnibus - University of Chicago Press, 1983. 353p - Edited by Nathaniel Benchley.
- The Best of Robert Benchley - Avenel Books, 1983. 353p.
- Benchley at the Theatre: Dramatic Criticism, 1920-1940 by Robert Benchley - Ipswich Press, 1985. - Edited by Charles Getchell, the volume contains 84 of Benchley's theatrical reviews written for Life and The New Yorker over his career.
- Robert Benchley's Wayward Press: The Complete Collection of his The New Yorker Columns written as Guy Fawkes (S.L. Harrison, ed.) - Wolf Den Books, 2008. 341p - Collection of all Wayward Press columns, with a Prologue by Nat Benchley.
- The Athletic Benchley-105 Exercises from The Detroit Athletic Club News - Glendower Media, 2010. ISBN 978-0914303022

== Film and television ==
Benchley filmed for Fox Film Corporation, Universal Pictures, RKO Radio Pictures, and then primarily for Metro-Goldwyn-Mayer and Paramount Pictures. Toward the end of his career, he did freelance acting around Hollywood. The films are listed by release date, not by production date.

=== Short films ===
- The Treasurer's Report (1928, Fox Film Corporation) as Treasurer
- The Sex Life of the Polyp (1928, Fox) as Lecturer
- The Spellbinder (1928, Fox) as himself
- Furnace Trouble (1929, Fox) as himself
- Lesson No. 1 (1929, Fox) as Lecturer
- Stewed, Fried, and Boiled (1929, Fox) as Lecturer
- Your Technocracy and Mine (1933, Universal Pictures) as himself
- How to Break 90 at Croquet (1935, RKO Radio Pictures) as Joe Doakes
- How to Sleep (1935, Metro-Goldwyn-Mayer - Written and acted by Benchley, the short was based on a study on sleep and won the Academy Award in 1935 for Best Short Film, Benchley played narrator and sleeper) as Lecturer
- David O. Selznick: 'Your New Producer' (1935, MGM) as Master of Ceremonies
- How to Behave (1936, MGM) as himself
- How to Train a Dog (1936, MGM) as Lecturer / Dog Owner
- How to Vote (1936, MGM) as himself
- How to Be a Detective (1936, MGM) as Lecturer
- The Romance of Digestion (1937, MGM) as Joe Doakes
- How to Start the Day (1937, MGM) as Lecturer
- A Night at the Movies (1937, MGM - Written and acted by Benchley, this short was his most well-received since How to Sleep. About a man going to the movies, the short was nominated for an Academy Award) as Husband
- How to Figure Income Tax (1938, MGM) as Joe Doakes
- Music Made Simple (1938, MGM) as Robert Benchley
- An Evening Alone (1938, MGM) as Doakes
- How to Raise a Baby (1938, MGM) as Lecturer Father
- The Courtship of the Newt (1938, MGM) as Zoology professor
- How to Read (1938, MGM) as Lecturer
- How to Watch Football (1938, MGM) as Football Fan
- Opening Day (1938, MGM) as City Treasurer Benchley
- Mental Poise (1938, MGM) as Psychoanalyst / Mr. Ostegraf
- How to Sub-Let (1939, MGM) as Joseph A. Doakes
- An Hour for Lunch (1939, MGM) as Lecturer / Joe
- Dark Magic (1939, MGM) as Joseph A. Doakes
- Home Early (1939, MGM) as Joe Doakes
- How to Eat (1939, MGM) as Lecturer / Joe Doakes
- The Day of Rest (1939, MGM) as Joe Doakes
- See Your Doctor (1939, MGM) as Lecturer / Joseph H. Doakes
- That Inferior Feeling (1940, MGM - Also known as That Inferior Feeling) as Joseph H. 'Joe' Doake
- Home Movies (1940, MGM) as Joe Doakes
- The Trouble with Husbands (1940, Paramount Pictures - Written by and starring Benchley) as Joe Doakes
- Waiting for Baby (1941, Paramount - Written by and starring Benchley) as Joseph Doakes
- Crime Control (1941, Paramount - Written by and starring Benchley) as Sgt. Benchley / Joe Doakes
- The Forgotten Man (1941, Paramount - Written by and starring Benchley) as Joe Doakes
- How To Take a Vacation (1941, Paramount - Written by and starring Benchley) as The Husband
- Nothing But Nerves (1941, Paramount - Written by and starring Benchley) as Mr. Benchley
- The Witness (1941, Paramount - Written by and starring Benchley) as Joe Doakes
- Keeping In Shape (1941, Paramount - Written by and starring Benchley) as Lecturer / Joe Doakes
- The Man's Angle (1942, Paramount - Written by and starring Benchley) as Joe Doakes
- My Tomato (1943, MGM - Starring Benchley) as Joseph A. Doakes
- No News Is Good News (1943, MGM - Written by and starring Benchley) as Answer Man / Newscaster
- Important Business (1944, MGM - Written by and starring Benchley) as Joseph A. Doakes
- Why, Daddy? (1944, MGM - Written by and starring Benchley - his last short film for MGM) as Joseph A. Doakes
- Boogie Woogie (1945, Paramount - Written by and starring Benchley) as Frederick Stumplefinger, Father
- Hollywood Victory Caravan (1945, Paramount and the United States Treasury Department - Starring Benchley, a film version of the touring show) as himself
- I'm a Civilian Here Myself (1945, United States Navy - Written by and starring Benchley) as Joe Doakes

=== Feature films ===
- You'd Be Surprised (1926, Paramount - Writer of intertitles for the film)
- The American Venus (1926, Paramount - writer of intertitles for the film) (uncredited)
- Sky Devils (1932, RKO - Featuring Benchley as a writer)
- The Sport Parade (1932, RKO - Written by and starring Benchley) as Radio Announcer
- Secrets of the French Police (1932, RKO - additional dialogue)
- Headline Shooter (1933, RKO - Starring Benchley) as Radio Announcer
- Rafter Romance (1933, RKO - Starring Ginger Rogers and Benchley) as Hubbell
- Dancing Lady (1933, MGM - Written by and starring Benchley) as Ward King
- Social Register (1934, Columbia Pictures - Starring Benchley in a bit part) as himself
- The Gay Divorcee (1934, RKO - Featuring Benchley as a writer; it was nominated for an Academy Award for Best Picture)
- The Gay Bride (1934, MGM - Featuring Benchley as a writer)
- Murder on a Honeymoon (1935, RKO - Featuring Benchley as a writer)
- China Seas (1935, MGM - Starring Benchley) as Charlie McCaleb
- Pursuit (1935, MGM - Featuring Benchley as a writer)
- The Perfect Gentleman (1935, MGM - Featuring Benchley as a writer)
- Dancing Pirate (1936, RKO - Featuring Benchley as a writer)
- Riffraff (1936, MGM - Featuring Benchley as a writer)
- Piccadilly Jim (1936, MGM - Featuring Benchley as a writer and actor; based on the novel of the same name by P. G. Wodehouse) as Bill Macon
- Broadway Melody of 1938 (1937, MGM - Starring Benchley in a bit part) as Duffy
- Live, Love and Learn (1938, MGM -Featuring Benchley as a writer) as Oscar
- Foreign Correspondent (1940, United Artists / Walter Wanger Productions - Directed by Alfred Hitchcock and featuring dialogue written by Benchley. Benchley also acted in the film) as Stebbins
- Hired Wife (1940, Universal - Starring Benchley) as Roger Van Horn
- The Reluctant Dragon (1941) - Walt Disney/RKO - Benchley played himself in the live action portions of this feature, giving a tour of the then-new Walt Disney Studios facility. Benchley was unhappy with the final product, as the writers relied too much (in his opinion) on pratfalls and visual gags) as himself
- Nice Girl? (1941, A dramatic film, and a straight role for Benchley, often considered his finest straight performance) as Oliver Wendall Holmes Dana
- You'll Never Get Rich (1941, Columbia - Starring Benchley) as Martin Cortland
- Three Girls About Town (1941, Columbia - Starring Benchley) as Wilburforce Puddle
- Bedtime Story (1941, Columbia - Starring Benchley) as Eddie Turner
- Take a Letter, Darling (1942, Paramount - Starring Benchley) as G.B. Atwater
- Syncopation (1942, RKO - Starring Benchley) as Doakes
- The Major and the Minor (1942, Paramount - Starring Benchley in a film directed by Billy Wilder) as Albert Osborne
- I Married a Witch (1942, United Artists - Starring Benchley in a film directed by René Clair) as Dr. Dudley White
- Young and Willing (1943, United Artists - Starring Benchley) as Arthur Kenny
- The Sky's the Limit (1943, RKO - Starring Benchley) as Phil Harriman
- Flesh and Fantasy (1943, Universal - Benchley narrated) as Doakes (Framing Story)
- Song of Russia (1944, MGM - Starring Benchley) as Hank Higgins
- See Here, Private Hargrove (1944, MGM - Starring Benchley) as Mr. Holliday (uncredited)
- Her Primitive Man (1944 - Starring Benchley) as Martin Osborne
- Janie (1944, Warner Bros. - Starring Benchley) as John Van Brunt
- National Barn Dance (1944, Paramount - Starring Benchley, a fictional account of the radio show of the same name) as J.B. Mitcham
- Practically Yours (1944, Paramount - Starring Benchley) as Judge Robert Simpson
- Pan-Americana (1945, RKO - Starring Benchley) as Charlie Corker
- It's in the Bag! (1945, United Artists - Starring Benchley) as Parker
- Duffy's Tavern (1945, Paramount - Starring Benchley as narrator in the film version of the show of the same name) as Robert Benchley
- Kiss and Tell (1945, Columbia - Starring Benchley) as Uncle George Archer
- Week-End at the Waldorf (1945, MGM - Starring Benchley) as Randy Morton
- Snafu (1945, Columbia - Starring Benchley) as Ben Stevens
- Road to Utopia (1945, Paramount - Benchley narrated) as narrator
- The Stork Club (1945, Paramount - Starring Benchley) as Tom P. Curtis
- The Bride Wore Boots (1946, Paramount - Starring Benchley) as Uncle Todd Warren
- Janie Gets Married (1946, Warner Bros. - Starring Benchley) as John Van Brunt (final film role)

=== Television ===
- Light's Diamond Jubilee (1954) TV special broadcast on all 4 TV networks, archive footage (from How to Raise a Baby)

== Works cited ==
- Billy Altman, Laughter's Gentle Soul: The Life of Robert Benchley. (New York City: W. W. Norton, 1997. ISBN 0-393-03833-5).
- Robert Benchley at IMDb. URL accessed 6 May 2007.
- The Robert Benchley Society: The Annotated Bibliography of Robert Benchley Writings. David Trumbull, URL accessed 20 May 2007.
- Norris W. Yates, Robert Benchley. (New York City, Twayne Publishers, 1968.).
