= Giant (1956 film) =

1956 American epic Western drama film

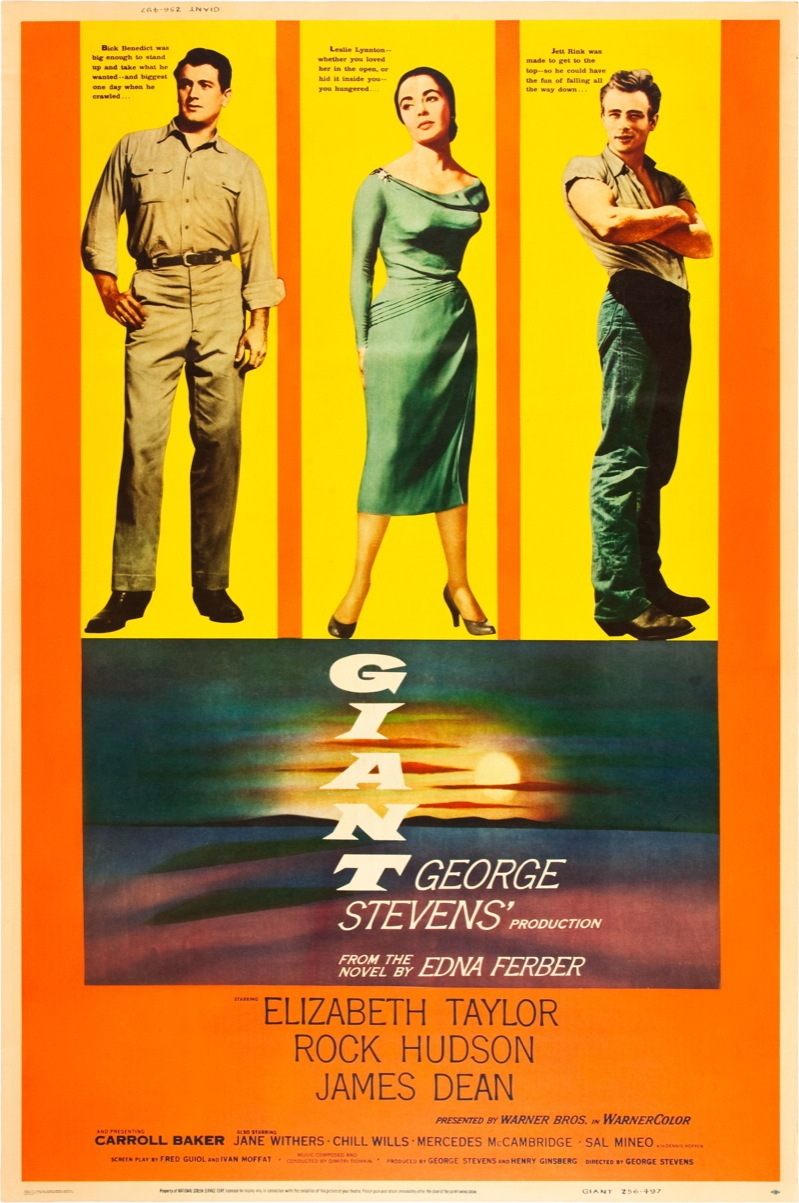
- Theatrical release poster by Bill Gold
- Directed by: George Stevens
- Screenplay by: Fred Guiol; Ivan Moffat
- Based on: Giant; 1952 novel by Edna Ferber
- Produced by: George Stevens; Henry Ginsberg
- Starring: Elizabeth Taylor; Rock Hudson; James Dean; Carroll Baker; Jane Withers; Chill Wills; Mercedes McCambridge; Sal Mineo; Dennis Hopper; Elsa Cárdenas; Earl Holliman
- Cinematography: William C. Mellor
- Edited by: William Hornbeck; Philip W. Anderson; Fred Bohanan
- Music by: Dimitri Tiomkin
- Distributed by: Warner Bros. Pictures
- Release dates: October 10, 1956 (New York City); November 24, 1956 (United States)
- Running time: 201 minutes
- Country: United States
- Language: English
- Budget: $5.4 million
- Box office: $39 million

Giant is a 1956 American epic drama film directed by George Stevens, from a screenplay adapted by Fred Guiol and Ivan Moffat from Edna Ferber's 1952 novel. The film stars Elizabeth Taylor, Rock Hudson, and James Dean; and features Carroll Baker, Jane Withers, Chill Wills, Mercedes McCambridge, Dennis Hopper, Sal Mineo, Rod Taylor, Elsa Cárdenas, and Earl Holliman.

Giant was the last of Dean's three films as a leading actor, and earned him his second and final Academy Award nomination – he was killed in a car crash before the film was released. His friend Nick Adams was called in to do some voice dubbing for Dean's role.

In 2005, the film was selected for preservation in the United States National Film Registry by the Library of Congress as being "culturally, historically or aesthetically significant".

== Plot ==
Trailer for Giant

In the mid-1920s, wealthy Texas rancher Jordan "Bick" Benedict Jr. travels to Maryland to purchase a prized stallion and meets socialite Leslie Lynnton. The two marry and return to the Benedict family's expansive cattle ranch, Reata, in Texas. Upon arrival, Leslie clashes with Bick's strong-willed sister, Luz, who resents her presence and tries to maintain control over the household. Leslie gradually discovers the deeply rooted patriarchal norms and racial hierarchies in Texas society, particularly the systemic discrimination against the region's Hispanic population. After escorting Leslie on a tour of the ranch, Jett Rink, a ranch hand infatuated with Leslie, points out the harsh living conditions of the Hispanic workers at the rundown village of Biendecito, where the Mexican laborers at Bick's ranch live in poverty. Leslie urges Bick to improve their circumstances. Her efforts include arranging medical care for Ángel Obregón II, the infant son of one of the workers, though Bick is initially reluctant to allow their family doctor to treat non-white patients.

Luz is killed after being thrown from Leslie's horse, War Winds. In her will, she bequeaths a small parcel of land to Jett, angering Bick. Jett declines Bick's offer to purchase the property and names it "Little Reata." Leslie and Bick have twins, Jordan III ("Jordy") and Judy, followed by a daughter, Luz II. Marital tensions lead Leslie to take the children to her parents in Maryland for an extended stay. Bick follows, and the couple reconciles and returns to Texas. Meanwhile, Jett works his land and eventually strikes oil. With his newfound wealth, he attempts to persuade Bick to permit oil drilling on Reata, but Bick refuses, determined to preserve the ranch's cattle legacy.

By 1941, the Benedict children have grown, and new tensions emerge. Bick expects Jordy to take over the ranch, but Jordy wishes to become a doctor. Leslie wants Judy to attend finishing school in Switzerland, though Judy aspires to study animal husbandry at Texas Tech. Each child successfully convinces one parent to support their goals.

At the family's Christmas gathering shortly after the attack on Pearl Harbor, Bick offers Judy's husband, Bob Dace, a postwar position on the ranch, which he declines in favor of building an independent life with Judy. Realizing his children are unlikely to continue the family ranching tradition, Bick finally agrees to allow oil drilling on Reata. Jordy later marries Juana, a collaborator of the Hispanic doctor who had treated Ángel Obregón II as a child. The family grows wealthier, but Ángel is killed in the war.

Jett, now a powerful oilman, hosts a lavish event at his Emperador hotel for the grand opening of The Jett Rink Airport at the fictional city of Hermoso and invites the Benedicts. A flirtation between Jett and Luz II ends after she rejects his awkward marriage proposal. Jett becomes intoxicated and orders that Hispanics not be served at his hotel, resulting in Juana being ignored at the beauty salon. When Jordy confronts Jett, he is assaulted and removed from the premises. Bick challenges Jett but, recognizing his inebriated state, refrains from physical retaliation. Jett later collapses during an attempt to deliver a speech at the event. Luz II overhears his lament over his long-unrequited love for Leslie and departs, visibly affected.

The next day, while driving home, the Benedicts stop at a diner where the owner, Sarge, insults Juana and her and Jordy's young son. When Sarge attempts to eject a Hispanic family, Bick intervenes and engages in a fight, ultimately being knocked unconscious. Back at Reata, he reflects on his perceived failure to uphold the family legacy. Leslie reassures him, stating that his actions at the diner made him her hero and that their legacy is embodied in their two grandsons—one white and one Hispanic.

== Cast ==
- Elizabeth Taylor as Leslie Lynnton Benedict
- Rock Hudson as Jordan "Bick" Benedict Jr.
- James Dean as Jett Rink
- Carroll Baker as Luz Benedict II, Leslie and Bick's younger daughter
- Jane Withers as Vashti Hake Snyth, the Benedicts' neighbor
- Chill Wills as Uncle Bawley, Bick's uncle
- Mercedes McCambridge as Luz Benedict, Bick's sister
- Dennis Hopper as Jordan "Jordy" Benedict III, Leslie and Bick's son
- Sal Mineo as Ángel Obregón II
- Rodney Taylor as Sir David Karfrey, Lacy's husband
- Judith Evelyn as Mrs. Nancy Lynnton, Leslie's mother
- Earl Holliman as Robert "Bob" Dace, Judy's husband
- Robert Nichols as Mort "Pinky" Snyth, Vashti's husband
- Paul Fix as Dr. Horace Lynnton, Leslie's father
- Alexander Scourby as Old Polo
- Fran Bennett as Judy Benedict, Leslie and Bick's older daughter
- Charles Watts as Judge Oliver Whiteside
- Elsa Cárdenas as Juana Villalobos Benedict, Jordan III's wife
- Carolyn Craig as Lacy Lynnton, Leslie's sister
- Monte Hale as Bale Clinch
- Sheb Wooley as Gabe Target
- Mary Ann Edwards as Adarene Clinch
- Victor Millan as Ángel Obregón
- Mickey Simpson as Sarge
- Pilar Del Rey as Mrs. Obregón
- Maurice Jara as Dr. Guerra
- Noreen Nash as Lona Lane
- Ray Whitley as Watts
- Napoleon Whiting as Swazey
- Tex Driscoll as Clay Hodgin Sr., oil millionaire

== Production ==
=== Writing ===
The character of Jordan Benedict II and the depiction of the Reata Ranch in Giant were inspired by Robert "Bob" J. Kleberg Jr. (1896–1974) and the King Ranch, located in Kingsville, Texas. Similar to the fictional Reata—which spans over half a million acres—the King Ranch encompasses approximately 825,000 acres (3,340 km^{2}; 1,289 sq mi) and extends across six Texas counties, including the majority of Kleberg County and a significant portion of Kenedy County. Historically, the King Ranch operated primarily as a livestock enterprise before the discovery of oil on the property.

The character of Jett Rink was partially based on Glenn McCarthy (1907–1988), a flamboyant Texas wildcatter whose rags-to-riches rise to wealth and notoriety helped shape the character. Author Edna Ferber met McCarthy while staying at his Shamrock Hotel in Houston, Texas, an encounter that contributed to the creation of the fictional Emperador Hotel featured in both the novel and its film adaptation.

The late Ivan Moffat who co-wrote the script with George Stevens remembered how he and the director labored over the job. Moffat told Martin Pitts of American Legends website: "Stevens attended every story conference. He paid more attention than any director I worked with. And most of the writing was done at George's house on Riverside Drive. We spent a lot of time making tea in the morning to avoid getting down to work. We took our time. We started the script in March 1954 and did not finish until December."

=== Casting ===
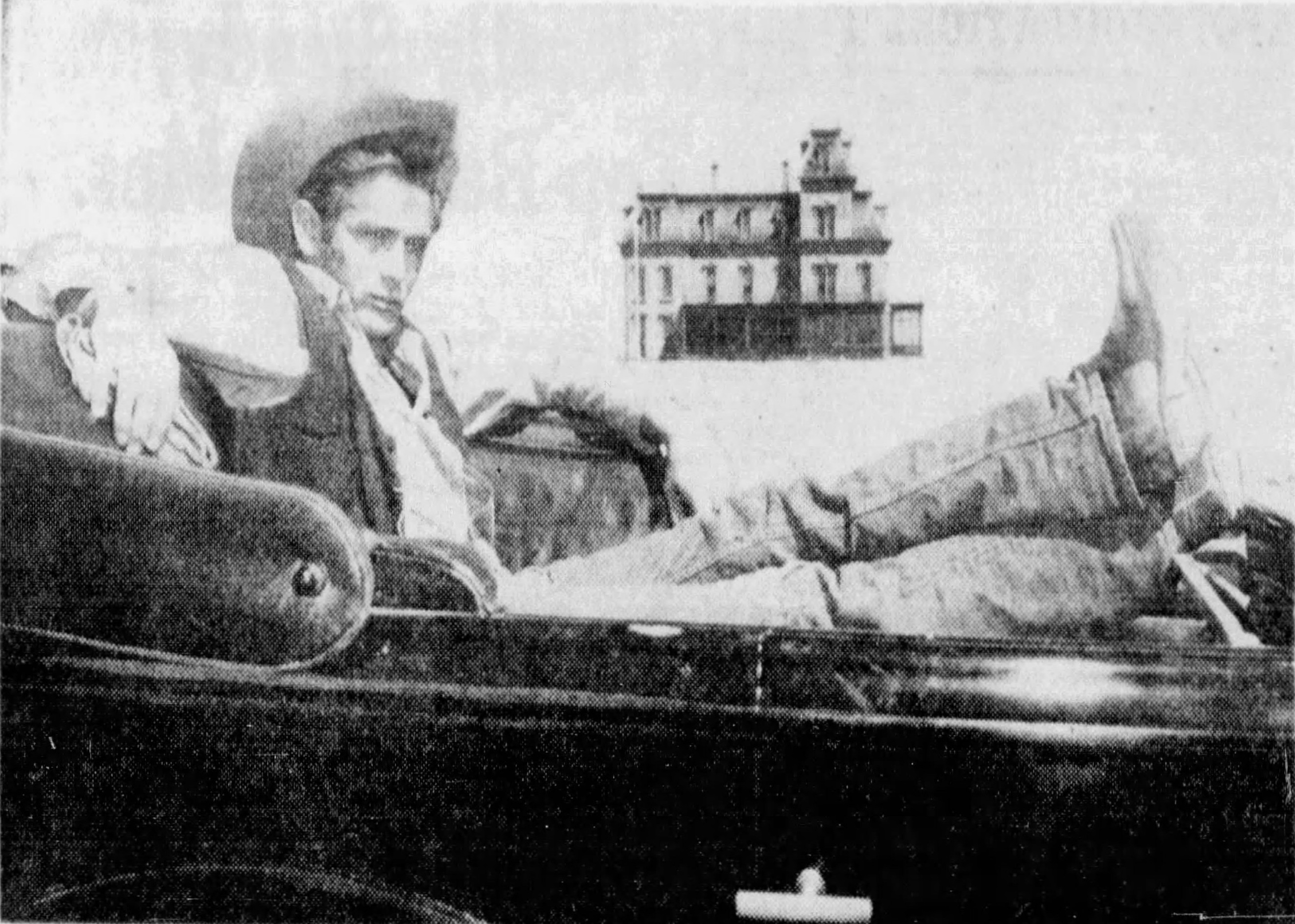
Dean on the set of Giant in June 1955

Australian actor Rod Taylor was cast in one of his early Hollywood film roles after being noticed in an episode of Studio 57 titled "The Black Sheep's Daughter".

Director George Stevens offered Rock Hudson a choice between Elizabeth Taylor and Grace Kelly for the role of Leslie; Hudson selected Taylor.

Stevens, known for his meticulous approach to filmmaking, spent an entire year editing the film. Following the death of James Dean late in production, actor Nick Adams was brought in to overdub several of Dean's lines as Jett Rink, which were deemed nearly inaudible during post-production.

=== Filming ===
Cast members and crew at work on the Reata mansion set. The Second-empire Victorian mansion facade designed by Boris Leven became an iconic image for the film.

The film begins with Jordan "Bick" Benedict, played by Hudson, arriving at Ardmore, Maryland, to purchase a stallion from the Lynnton family. The first part of the picture was actually shot in Albemarle County, Virginia, and used the Keswick, Virginia, railroad station as the Ardmore railway depot. Much of the subsequent film, depicting "Reata", the Benedict ranch, was shot in and around the town of Marfa, Texas, and the remote, dry plains found nearby, with interiors filmed at the Warner Bros. studios in Burbank, California. The "Jett Rink Day" parade and airport festivities were filmed at the Burbank Airport.

Don Graham, a scholar of Texas literature, film, and popular culture, writes that Elizabeth Taylor and Rock Hudson did not interact with the townspeople of Marfa. He quotes a citizen, Marcos Peña, who worked as a porter at the El Paisano Hotel, where the cast stayed during filming, as saying that Dean was the friendliest of the film's stars and shot pool with the locals in the hotel's basement.

=== Music ===
The Oscar-nominated musical score was by Russian-born composer and conductor Dimitri Tiomkin, who conducted the Warner Brothers Studio Orchestra.

=== Themes ===
The movie is an epic portrayal of a powerful Texas ranching family challenged by changing times and the coming of big oil. A major subplot concerns the racism of many Anglo-European Americans in Texas during the mid-twentieth century, and the discriminatory social segregation enforced against Mexican Americans. In the first third of the film, Bick and Luz treat the Mexicans who work on their ranch condescendingly, which upsets the more socially conscious Leslie. Bick eventually comes to realize his moral shortcomings – in a climactic scene at a roadside diner he loses a fistfight to the racist owner, but earns Leslie's respect for defending the human rights of his brown-skinned daughter-in-law and grandson. Another subplot involves Leslie's own striving for women's equal rights as she defies the patriarchal social order, asserting herself and expressing her own opinions when the men talk. She protests being expected to suppress her beliefs in deference to Bick's; this conflict leads to their temporary separation.

Giant is Edna Ferber's third novel dealing with racism; the first was Show Boat (1926), which was adapted into the legendary Broadway musical Show Boat (1927); her second was Cimarron (1929), which was adapted to film twice, in 1931 and 1960. Ferber's Giant was a blockbuster, selling 52 million books by 1956.

== Release ==
Giant premiered in New York City on October 10, 1956, with the local DuMont station, WABD, televising the arrival of cast and crew, as well as other celebrities and studio chief Jack L. Warner. The picture was released to nationwide distribution on November 24, 1956.

Capitol Records, which had issued some of Dimitri Tiomkin's music from the soundtrack (with the composer conducting the Warner Brothers studio orchestra) on an LP, later digitally remastered the tracks and issued them on CD, including two tracks conducted by Ray Heindorf. Both versions used a monaural blend of the multi-channel soundtrack recording.

=== Home media ===
The film was released on DVD on June 10, 2003. The DVD includes more than three hours of documentaries. The out of print Blu-ray was released on November 5, 2013, as part of the James Dean Ultimate Collector's Edition set, and as an individual DigiBook release followed by a non-DigiBook Blu-ray on March 11, 2014. Those releases contained three discs including two DVDs with all the extras from the 2004 release. The full length George Stevens: A Filmmaker's Journey documentary is also included on one of the DVD discs. The manufacture-on-demand 4K Ultra HD release of the film released on June 21, 2022, through Studio Distribution Services.

== Reception ==
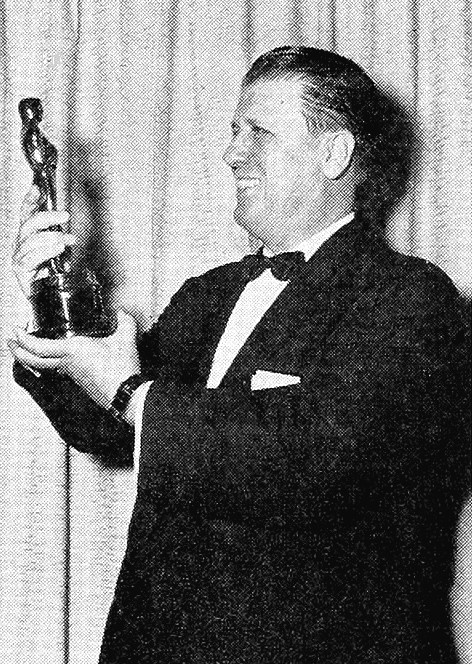
George Stevens with the Academy Award he received for directing Giant

As of October 2024, Giant holds an 86% fresh rating on Rotten Tomatoes based on 51 reviews, with an average rating of 7.7/10. The critical consensus reads, "Giant earns its imposing name with a towering narrative supported by striking cinematography, big ideas, and powerful work from a trio of legendary Hollywood leads." Metacritic, which uses a weighted average, assigned the film a score of 84 out of 100, based on 15 critics, indicating "universal acclaim".

Giant won praise from both critics and the public, and according to the Texan author Larry McMurtry, was especially popular with Texans, even though it was sharply critical of Texan society. Bosley Crowther of the New York Times wrote that "George Stevens takes three hours and seventeen minutes to put his story across. That's a heap of time to go on about Texas, but Mr. Stevens has made a heap of film." He continued to write that "Giant, for all its complexity, is a strong contender for the year's top-film award."

Variety claimed that Giant was "for the most part, an excellent film which registers strongly on all levels, whether it's in its breathtaking panoramic shots of the dusty Texas plains; the personal, dramatic impact of the story itself, or the resounding message it has to impart."

In the 21st century, TV Guide gave the film four stars out of five, writing of James Dean's performance: "This was the last role in Dean's all-too-brief career – he was dead when the film was released – and his presence ran away with the film. He performs his role in the overwrought method manner of the era, and the rest of the cast seems to be split between awe of his talent and disgust over his indulgence."

Less complimentary was director and critic Francois Truffaut, who said in his 1956 review of Giant that it was "Three hours and twenty minutes of deadly boredom tinted with disgust" and a "silly, solemn, sly, paternalistic, demagogic movie without any boldness, rich in all sorts of concessions, pettiness, and contemptible actions."

=== Box office ===
Giant was a huge box-office success. The film earned $35 million in ticket sales during its original studio release in 1956, a record for a Warner Brothers film until that time. This record was not surpassed until the Warner film Superman in the late 1970s.

The movie earned $12 million in rentals in the United States and Canada during its initial release. It did not perform as well in other markets where it made around half as much, but it was one of the biggest hits of the year in France, with admissions of 3,723,209.

=== Accolades ===
Award	Category	Nominee(s)	Result	Ref.
Academy Awards	Best Motion Picture	George Stevens and Henry Ginsberg	Nominated	
Academy Awards	Best Director	George Stevens	Won	
Academy Awards	Best Actor	James Dean (Note: Posthumous nomination.)	Nominated	
Academy Awards	Best Actor	Rock Hudson	Nominated	
Academy Awards	Best Supporting Actress	Mercedes McCambridge	Nominated	
Academy Awards	Best Screenplay – Adapted	Ivan Moffat and Fred Guiol	Nominated	
Academy Awards	Best Art Direction – Color	Art Direction: Boris Leven; Set Decoration: Ralph S. Hurst	Nominated	
Academy Awards	Best Costume Design – Color	Moss Mabry and Marjorie Best	Nominated	
Academy Awards	Best Film Editing	William Hornbeck, Philip W. Anderson, and Fred Bohanan	Nominated	
Academy Awards	Best Music Score of a Dramatic or Comedy Picture	Dimitri Tiomkin	Nominated	
David di Donatello Awards	Best Foreign Producer		Won (Note: Tied with Richard III.)	
Directors Guild of America Awards	Outstanding Directorial Achievement in Motion Pictures	George Stevens	Won	
Golden Globe Awards	Best Motion Picture – Drama		Nominated	
Golden Globe Awards	Best Director – Motion Picture	George Stevens	Nominated	
Golden Globe Awards	Most Promising Newcomer – Female	Carroll Baker (also for Baby Doll)	Won	
National Film Preservation Board	National Film Registry		Inducted	
New York Film Critics Circle Awards	Best Film		Nominated	
New York Film Critics Circle Awards	Best Screenplay	Ivan Moffat and Fred Guiol	Nominated	
Online Film & Television Association Awards	Film Hall of Fame: Productions		Inducted	
Photoplay Awards	Gold Medal		Won	
Saturn Awards	Best DVD or Blu-ray Collection	Giant (as part of "The James Dean Ultimate Collector's Collection")	Nominated	
Writers Guild of America Awards	Best Written American Drama	Ivan Moffat and Fred Guiol	Nominated	

=== Other honors ===
American Film Institute recognition

- AFI's 100 Years...100 Movies – #82

== Legacy ==
Giant is considered to be the inspiration for the hit 1980s television drama Dallas. Both productions focus on the struggle between wealthy oilmen and cattlemen in Texas in the mid to late 20th century. In addition, both productions have an antagonist with the initials J.R.

In 1978, Martin Scorsese wrote about the movie as a guilty pleasure:

I've seen this film over forty times. I don't like the obvious romanticism, and it's very studied, but there's more here than people have seen. It has to do with the depiction of a life style through the passage of so many years. You see people grow. I like James Dean; I like the use of music, even though Dimitri Tiomkin did it; I like Boris Leven's image of the house, and the changes in the house; I like the wide image of Mercedes McCambridge riding the bronco, then cut to an extreme closeup of her hitting the bronco with her spur, then back to the wide image. As far as filmmaking goes, Giant is an inspiring film. I don't mean morally, but visually. It's all visual.

The making of Giant was the background to the play and movie Come Back to the 5 & Dime, Jimmy Dean, Jimmy Dean.

In 1981, in a Levi Strauss ad campaign and television commercial that launched the 501 Jeans for women, an actress says: "Travis, you're years too late", evoking a scene from the movie with James Dean.

In April 2015, LGBTQ magazine The Advocate stated that the film "gets some kind of an award for the most gay and bisexual actors ever in one film," noting that James Dean, Rock Hudson, Sal Mineo, and Earl Holliman were all either bisexual or homosexual. The Advocate also noted that Mercedes McCambridge's character Luz hinted she was a homosexual through at least her name, also noting how despite never personally coming out, McCambridge "played the most fiercely dykey roles on-screen to perfection."

The February 2020 issue of New York Magazine selected Giant as among "The Best Movies That Lost Best Picture at the Oscars."

== See also ==
- List of American films of 1956
- "Pest of the West", the sixteenth episode of the fifth season of SpongeBob SquarePants, featuring stock footage from Giant (1956) depicting Sandy's paternal great-aunt Rosie Cheeks, who was the first squirrel to discover oil in Texas.
