= Philip W. Anderson (film editor) =

American film editor (1915–1980)

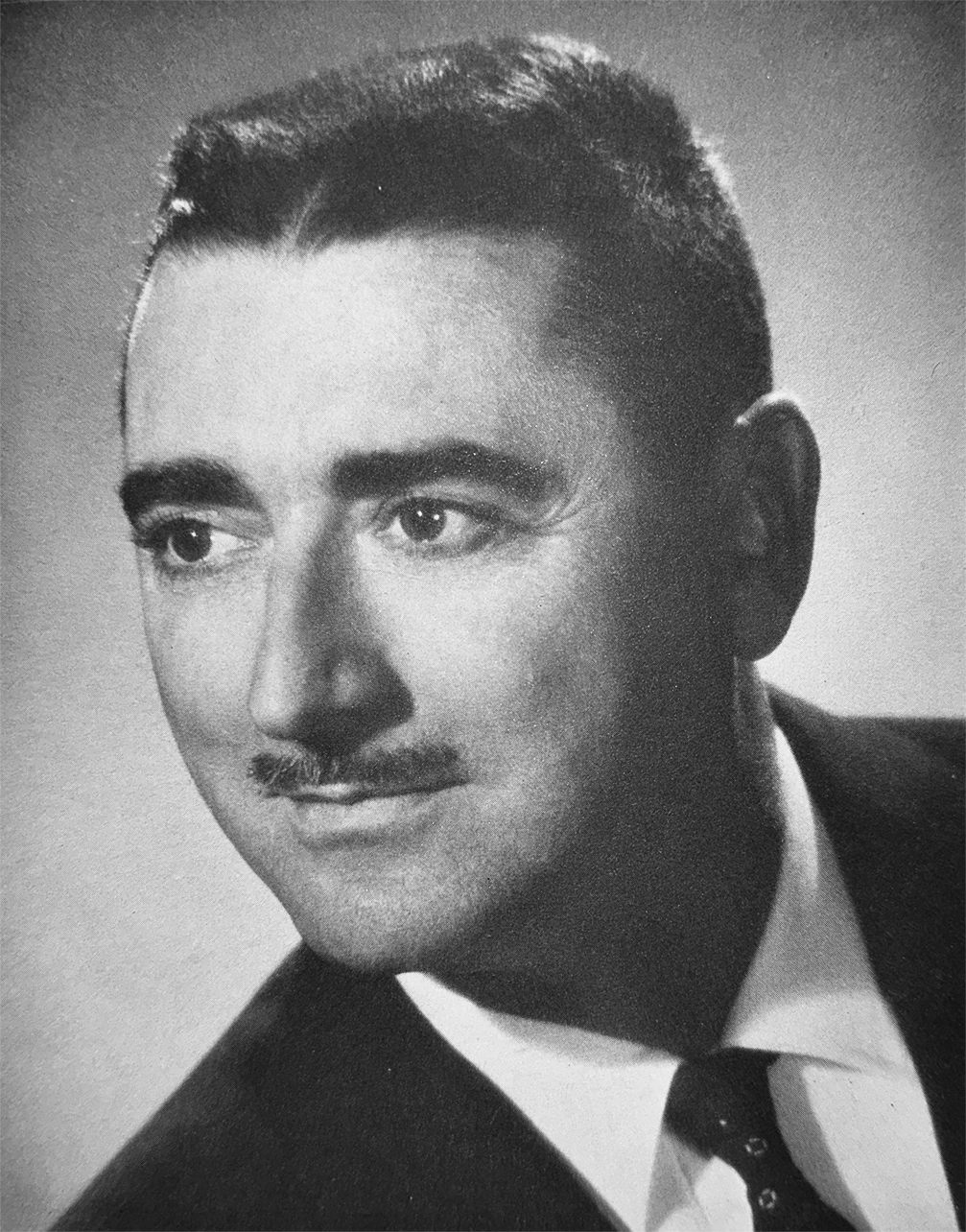
- Born: Philip William Anderson; June 23, 1915; New York City, New York, U.S.
- Died: March 27, 1980 (aged 64); Granada Hills, Los Angeles, U.S.
- Occupation: Film editor
- Years active: 1939–1971

Philip W. Anderson (June 23, 1915 – March 27, 1980) was an American film editor with more than fifty film credits commencing with the 1939 films, Marine Circus and Dark Magic.

He was nominated for the Academy Award for Best Film Editing for three films: Giant (directed by George Stevens - 1956; with William Hornbeck and Fred Bohanan), Sayonara (directed by Joshua Logan - 1957; with Arthur P. Schmidt), and The Parent Trap (directed by David Swift - 1961). His final credit is for A Man Called Horse (directed by Elliot Silverstein - 1970).

== Filmography ==
Editor
| Year | Film | Director | Notes |
|---|---|---|---|
| 1956 | Giant | George Stevens | |
| 1957 | Sayonara | Joshua Logan | First collaboration with Joshua Logan |
| 1958 | Westbound | Budd Boetticher | |
| 1958 | Home Before Dark | Mervyn LeRoy | First collaboration with Mervyn LeRoy |
| 1959 | The FBI Story | Mervyn LeRoy | Second collaboration with Mervyn LeRoy |
| 1960 | Cash McCall | Joseph Pevney | First collaboration with Joseph Pevney |
| 1960 | Tall Story | Joshua Logan | Second collaboration with Joshua Logan |
| 1960 | Ocean's 11 | Lewis Milestone | |
| 1961 | The Parent Trap | David Swift | |
| 1961 | A Majority of One | Mervyn LeRoy | Third collaboration with Mervyn LeRoy |
| 1962 | Gypsy | Mervyn LeRoy | Fourth collaboration with Mervyn LeRoy |
| 1963 | One Man's Way | Denis Sanders | |
| 1965 | Mister Moses | Ronald Neame | |
| 1966 | Moment to Moment | Mervyn LeRoy | Fifth collaboration with Mervyn LeRoy |
| 1966 | The Night of the Grizzly | Joseph Pevney | Second collaboration with Joseph Pevney |
| 1967 | The Happening | Elliot Silverstein | First collaboration with Elliot Silverstein |
| 1968 | How to Save a Marriage and Ruin Your Life | Fielder Cook | |
| 1968 | The Sweet Ride | Harvey Hart | |
| 1970 | A Man Called Horse | Elliot Silverstein | Second collaboration with Elliot Silverstein |
| 1971 | Mrs. Pollifax-Spy | Leslie H. Martinson | Uncredited |

Editorial department
| Year | Film | Director | Role |
|---|---|---|---|
| 1956 | Giant | George Stevens | Associate film editor |

Actor
| Year | Film | Director | Role | Notes |
|---|---|---|---|---|
| 1927 | Man, Woman and Sin | Monta Bell | Al Whitcomb (as a Child) | |
| 1929 | Redskin | Victor Schertzinger | Young Wing Foot | Uncredited |

Short documentaries

Editor
| Year | Film | Director |
|---|---|---|
| 1939 | Marine Circus | James A. FitzPatrick |
| 1939 | Set 'em Up | Felix E. Feist |
| 1940 | Quicker'n a Wink | George Sidney |
| 1941 | Football Thrills of 1940 | Pete Smith |
| 1941 | Army Champions | Paul C. Vogel |
| 1942 | It's a Dog's Life | Robert Wohlmuth |
| 1942 | Football Thrills of 1941 | Pete Smith |
| 1942 | Marines in the Making | Herbert Polesie |
| 1943 | Wild Horses | —N/a |
| 1943 | Sky Science | Will Jason |
| 1943 | Dog House | Robert Wohlmuth |
| 1943 | Football Thrills of 1942 | Pete Smith |
| 1943 | Water Wisdom | —N/a |
| 1944 | Grandpa Called It Art | Walter Hart |
| 1944 | Football Thrills of 1943 | Pete Smith |
| 1945 | Football Thrills of 1944 | Pete Smith |
| 1946 | Fala at Hyde Park | Gunther von Fritsch |

Director
| Year | Film |
|---|---|
| 1942 | Self Defense |

Shorts

Editor
| Year | Film | Director |
|---|---|---|
| 1939 | Dark Magic | Roy Rowland |
| 1939 | Radio Hams | Felix E. Feist |
| 1939 | Culinary Carving | Felix E. Feist |
| 1939 | Take a Cue | Felix E. Feist |
| 1939 | Let's Talk Turkey | Felix E. Feist |
| 1939 | Romance of the Potato | Sammy Lee |
| 1940 | Maintain the Right | Joseph M. Newman; Willard Van der Veer |
| 1940 | Stuffie | Fred Zinnemann |
| 1940 | The Domineering Male | Johnny Hines |
| 1940 | Spots Before Your Eyes | Johnny Hines |
| 1940 | Social Sea Lions | Johnny Hines |
| 1940 | 'What's Your 'I.Q.'?': Number Two | George Sidney |
| 1941 | Penny to the Rescue | Will Jason |
| 1941 | Quiz Biz | Will Jason |
| 1941 | Murder in 3-D | George Sidney |
| 1941 | Memory Tricks | Will Jason |
| 1941 | Aeronutics | Francis Corby; S.B. Harrison |
| 1941 | Cuban Rhythm | Will Jason |
| 1941 | Water Bugs | Will Jason |
| 1941 | Flicker Memories | —N/a |
| 1941 | Fancy Answers | Basil Wrangell |
| 1941 | How to Hold Your Husband - BACK | Johnny Hines |
| 1942 | Aqua Antics | Louis Lewyn |
| 1942 | What About Daddy? | Will Jason |
| 1942 | Acro-Batty | Louis Lewyn |
| 1942 | Victory Quiz | Will Jason |
| 1942 | Pete Smith's Scrapbook | —N/a |
| 1942 | Barbee-Cues | Will Jason |
| 1942 | Victory Vittles | Will Jason |
| 1942 | Calling All Pa's | Will Jason |
| 1943 | First Aid | Will Jason |
| 1943 | Hollywood Daredevils | Louis Lewyn |
| 1943 | Fala: The President's Dog | Gunther von Fritsch |
| 1943 | Seeing Hands | Gunther von Fritsch |
| 1943 | Seventh Column | Will Jason |
| 1943 | Scrap Happy | Will Jason |
| 1943 | Tips on Trips | Will Jason |
| 1944 | Practical Joker | Will Jason |
| 1944 | Home Maid | Will Jason |
| 1944 | Groovie Movie | Will Jason |
| 1944 | Easy Life | Walter Hart |
| 1944 | Movie Pests | Will Jason |

Director
| Year | Film |
|---|---|
| 1945 | Badminton |
| 1946 | Gettin' Glamour |

Second unit or assistant director
| Year | Film | Director | Role | Notes |
|---|---|---|---|---|
| 1946 | Treasures from Trash | Dave O'Brien | Assistant director | Uncredited |
| 1946 | I Love My Husband, But! | Dave O'Brien | Assistant director | Uncredited |

Writer
| Year | Film | Director |
|---|---|---|
| 1946 | Treasures from Trash | Dave O'Brien |

TV movies

Editor
| Year | Film | Director |
|---|---|---|
| 1971 | Goodbye, Raggedy Ann | Fielder Cook |

TV series

Editor
| Year | Title | Notes |
|---|---|---|
| 1955 | The Stu Erwin Show | 2 episodes |
| 1963 | The Great Adventure | 1 episode |
| 1970 | My World and Welcome to It | 2 episodes |
