= Dark Magic (film) =

1939 film by Roy Rowland

- Directed by: Roy Rowland
- Written by: Robert Benchley
- Produced by: Jack Chertok
- Starring: Robert Benchley; Ruth Lee; John Scarne
- Edited by: Philip W. Anderson
- Production company: Metro-Goldwyn-Mayer
- Distributed by: Metro-Goldwyn-Mayer
- Release date: May 13, 1939 (United States)
- Running time: 10 minutes
- Country: United States
- Language: English

Dark Magic (1939) is a short comedy film produced by Robert Benchley for Metro-Goldwyn-Mayer. Benchley appears as Joe Doakes, who goes to a magic shop to see a magician perform magic tricks. Sharp-eyed viewers will recognize "Mr. Calypso", the magic demonstrator, as none other than sleight-of-hand master John Scarne.

== Cast ==
- Robert Benchley as Joseph A. Doakes
- Ruth Lee as Mrs. Doakes
- John Scarne as Mr. Calypso

== See also ==
- List of Robert Benchley collections and film appearances
