= That Inferior Feeling =

Short comedy film

- Directed by: Basil Wrangell
- Written by: Basil Wrangell; Robert Benchley
- Starring: Robert Benchley; William Bailey; May Beatty
- Cinematography: Robert H. Planck
- Music by: Albert Akst
- Color process: Black and White
- Production company: Metro-Goldwyn-Mayer
- Distributed by: MGM
- Release date: January 20, 1940
- Running time: 9 minutes
- Country: United States
- Language: English

That Inferior Feeling (1940) is a short comedy film produced by Robert Benchley for Metro-Goldwyn-Mayer. Benchley appears as Joe Doakes in a series of scenes demonstrating the symptoms of inferiority, Benchley also serves as narrator.

== Premise ==
A man is unable to cope with personal emergencies or deal with people in positions of authority.

== Cast ==
- Robert Benchley as Joseph H. 'Joe' Doakes
- William Bailey as Guard (uncredited)
- May Beatty as Woman (uncredited)
- Barbara Bedford as Bride (uncredited)
- John Butler as Desk Clerk (uncredited)
- Charles Irwin as Tailor (uncredited)
- Ruth Lee as Mrs. Joseph H. Doakes (uncredited)
- Jack Mulhall as Bank Teller (uncredited)
- William Tannen as Man (uncredited)

== Scenes ==
- Introductory monologue - Benchley introduces the inferiority feelings of men.
- Wedding - where the groom is concerned if someone will speak up against the marriage. The groom acts like he's guilty although he has nothing to fear.
- Asking Directions - A man acts embarassaed, too embarrassed to ask directions from an official at a railway station.
- New suit - Nervous when being measured by a tailor, and too self-conscious to be seen in a 'conspicuous' suit.
- Hotel - How men act guilty when booking a hotel room for himself and his wife.
- Bank - How men act guilty around bank security and officials.
- Concluding monologue - Developing a sense around others. Benchley is disturbed during his monologue by the cleaning staff.

== See also ==
- List of Robert Benchley collections and film appearances
