= Robert Lees =

American actor (1912–2004)

- Born: July 10, 1912; San Francisco, California, United States
- Died: June 13, 2004 (aged 91); Los Angeles, California, United States
- Cause of death: Decapitation
- Other names: J.E. Selby; Jay Selby
- Occupation: Screenwriter
- Years active: 1931–1983
- Spouse: Jean Abel (m.?–1982)

Robert Lees (July 10, 1912 – June 13, 2004) was an American television and film screenwriter. Lees was best known for writing comedy, including several Abbott and Costello films.

== Life and career ==
Lees was born in San Francisco, California, the son of Edward Lees (1870–1940) and Beatrice Lees (née Badt, 1874–1970). Lees graduated from Lowell High School in 1929. He started in show business as a dancer before becoming a writer for MGM Studios, where he was paired with the writer Frederic Rinaldo. Their first screenplay was for the 1936 short film, The Perfect Set-Up. The short film was the first in the "Crime Does Not Pay" series. The series, which was produced by MGM in the 1930s and 1940s, were based on real life crime cases. Lees and Rinaldo continued to work on comedy shorts including, A Night At The Movies, starring Robert Benchley, and Penny Wisdom. The duo also worked on the 1937 films Decathlon Champions and Candid Cameramaniacs from the Pete Smith Specialty series. In 1939, Lees and Rinaldo were nominated for an Academy Award for the 1939 biographical short film Prophet Without Honor.

After completing the comedy short An Hour For Lunch, in 1939, Lees and Rinaldo moved on to feature-length films with the 1940 drama, Street Of Memories. The pair worked on the sci-fi/horror films, The Invisible Woman and The Black Cat. In 1941, they wrote their first comedy for Abbott and Costello entitled, Hold That Ghost. In the following years, Lees and Rinaldo would go on to write six more movies for the comedy duo, namely, Hit the Ice, Buck Privates Come Home, The Wistful Widow of Wagon Gap, Abbott and Costello Meet Frankenstein, Abbott and Costello Meet the Invisible Man, and Comin' Round the Mountain (1951). In 1952, an unused treatment they wrote for a service comedy at Paramount around 1943 was later adapted as Jumping Jacks for another comic duo, Martin and Lewis.

In the early 1950s, Lees' career was virtually destroyed when he was put on the Hollywood blacklist by movie studio bosses during the McCarthy Era for alleged Communist activities. As a result of his blacklisting, he had associates submit manuscripts to the studios under the pseudonym "J. E. Selby." Lees also wrote pseudonymously for the British television series The Adventures of Robin Hood during the blacklist. At age 91 he declared that the speech he delivered in 1951 to the House Committee on UnAmerican Activities was the best thing he ever wrote.

== Retirement ==
After retiring from screenwriting in 1983 and becoming associated with sexologist Helen Colton (1918–2014), who would become his girlfriend to the end of his life, he became active in atheist and humanist circles, sometimes speaking at events.

== Murder ==
On June 13, 2004, sometime around 11 a.m., Keven Lee Graff, a 27-year-old homeless man, broke into Lees' home. Graff attacked the 91-year-old Lees and decapitated him. Graff then left the home, carrying Lees's severed head, and broke into a neighboring house. The occupant of the home was a 69-year-old retired doctor, Morley Engleson. Graff then attacked and killed Engleson, who was on the telephone making a plane reservation. The Southwest Airlines ticketing agent heard the attack and phoned police. Before police could arrive, Graff stole Engleson's 2001 Mercedes-Benz and left the scene.

During a search through Engleson's house, police discovered Lees' severed head lying on a bed. Lees' longtime girlfriend, Helen Colton, discovered Lees' headless body, covered by blankets, in his bedroom some five hours later when she arrived to pick Lees up for an event at the Academy headquarters in Beverly Hills.

The following day, Graff caught the attention of security guards at the gates of Paramount Pictures when he began behaving erratically; talking to himself and yelling at passing cars. One security guard identified Graff from a picture that was shown on a televised news conference about the double murders, and phoned police. When questioned about the crimes, Graff claimed that a man on the streets of Hollywood gave him methamphetamine and Ecstasy the night before the murders claiming he had no memory of committing the murders.

In February 2008, Graff, under a plea bargain, pleaded guilty to ten felonies for the murders of Lees and Engelson. Under the plea agreement, Graff received two consecutive life terms without the possibility of parole.

== Filmography ==
=== Writer ===
- The Perfect Set-up (1936)
- How to Behave (1936)
- How to Train a Dog (1936)
- How to Be a Detective (1936)
- Penny Wisdom (1937)
- How to Start the Day (1937)
- A Night at the Movies (1937)
- Decathlon Champion: The Story of Glenn Morris a.k.a. Decathlon Champion (1937)
- Candid Cameramaniacs (1937)
- Music Made Simple (1938)
- An Evening Alone (1938)
- The Story of Doctor Carver (1938)
- It's in the Stars (1938)
- An Hour for Lunch (1939)
- Weather Wizards (1939)
- Prophet Without Honor a.k.a. Carey Wilson's Prophet Without Honor (1939)
- Let's Talk Turkey (1939)
- Street of Memories (1940)
- The Invisible Woman (1940)
- The Black Cat (1941)
- Bachelor Daddy (1941)
- Hold That Ghost a.k.a. Oh Charlie (1941)
- Juke Box Jenny (1942)
- No Time For Love (1943)
- Hit the Ice a.k.a. Oh Doctor (1943)
- Crazy House (1943)
- Hell-Bent for Election (1943)
- Buck Privates Come Home a.k.a. Rookies Come Home (1947)
- The Wistful Widow of Wagon Gap a.k.a. The Wistful Widow (1947)
- Abbott and Costello Meet Frankenstein (1948)
- Holiday in Havana (1949)
- You Asked For It (Unknown episodes, 1950)
- Abbott and Costello Meet the Invisible Man (1951)
- Comin' Round the Mountain (1951)
- Jumping Jacks (1952)
- Gunsmoke (Unknown episodes, 1955)
- The Adventures of Robin Hood (Unknown episodes, 1955)
- The Adventures of Sir Lancelot (Unknown episodes, 1955)
- Hotel de Paree (Unknown episodes, 1959)
- Alfred Hitchcock Presents (1 episode, 1959)
- Lassie (14 episodes, 1957–1961)
- Rawhide (3 episodes, 1961–1962)
- Flipper (Unknown episodes, 1964)
- Gilligan's Island (1 episode, 1966)
- Daktari (Unknown episodes, 1966)
- Please Don't Eat the Daisies (1 episode, 1966)
- The Green Hornet (1 episode, 1967)
- The Second Hundred Years (2 episodes, 1967)
- Land of the Giants (1 episode, 1968)
- The New Scooby and Scrappy-Doo Show (1 episode, 1983)

=== Actor ===
- The Sin of Madelon Claudet a.k.a. The Lullaby (Uncredited, 1931)
- Grand Hotel (Uncredited, 1932)
- Rasputin and the Empress a.k.a. Rasputin the Mad Monk (Uncredited, 1932)
- Dancing Lady (Uncredited, 1933)
