= How to Train a Dog =

- Directed by: Arthur Ripley
- Written by: Mitzi Cummings; Felix E. Feist; Robert Lees; Frederic I. Rinaldo; Pete Smith; Walter Wise
- Starring: Robert Benchley
- Narrated by: Robert Benchley
- Distributed by: Metro-Goldwyn-Mayer
- Release date: 1936
- Running time: 8 minutes
- Country: United States
- Language: English

How to Train a Dog is a 1936 short film released through MGM Studios starring Robert Benchley. The short film reveals how not to train a dog, as the character Benchley gets the dog from a pet store.

== Cast ==
- Robert Benchley
