= Kate Carew =

American cartoonist and caricaturist

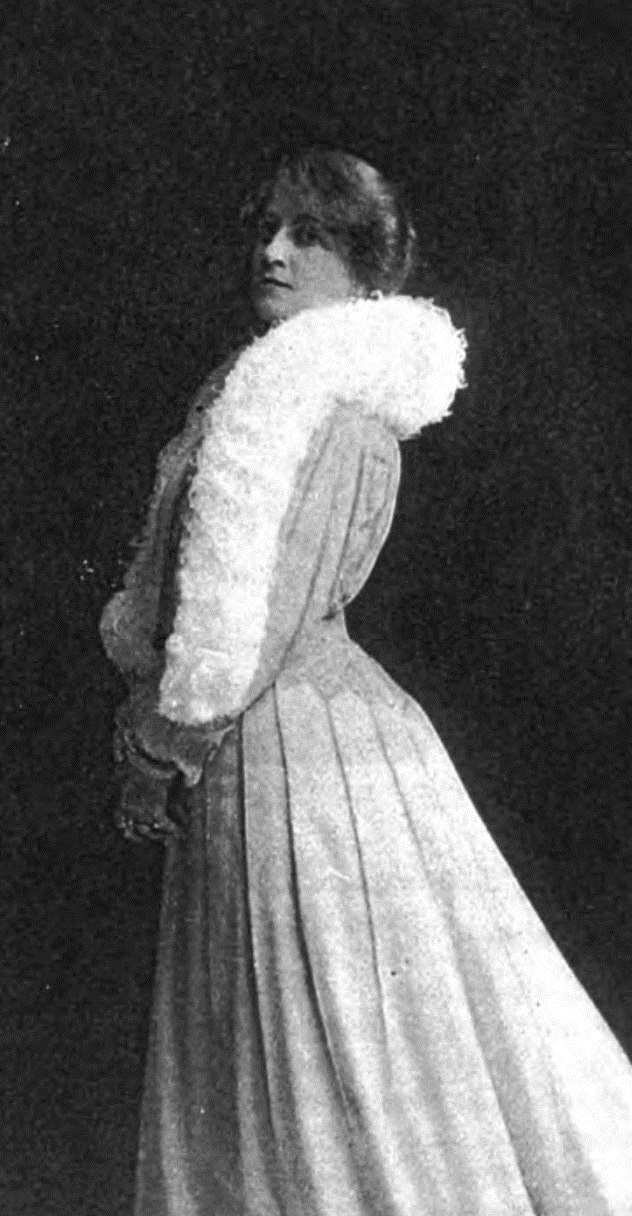
Kate Carew in 1903

Mary Williams (June 27, 1869 – February 11, 1961), who wrote pseudonymously as Kate Carew, was an American caricaturist self-styled as "The Only Woman Caricaturist". She worked at the New York World, providing illustrated celebrity interviews.

== Education ==
Convent of Notre Dame, San Jose, Cal.; Mark Hopkins Institute of Art, University of California.; awarded gold medal for painting, 1891; Studied at the Atelier Colarossi, Paris, and the N.Y. School of Art.

== Biography ==
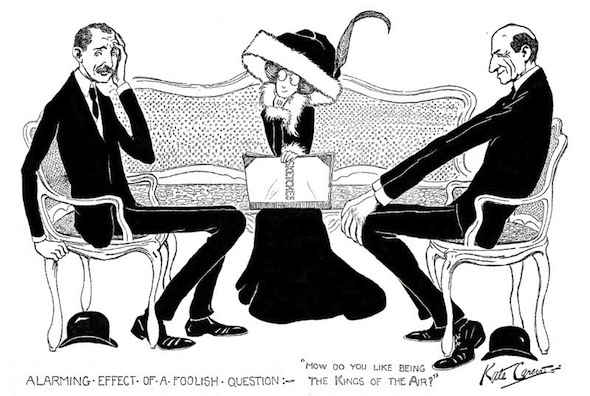
The Wright Brothers and Kate Carew (before 1912)

Mary Williams (pseudonym "Kate Carew") was born in Oakland, California, and began her art training at San Francisco’s School of Design under the esteemed Arthur Mathews and received the school’s “Special Medal for Excellence in Painting” at the local Art Association’s 1891 Winter Annual. Her brother was Gluyas Williams.

From 1891 to 1895 her art received awards at the California State Fair. She exhibited at the World’s Columbian Exposition in Chicago in 1893. After the death of her first husband, Seymour Chapin Davison, in 1897 she became, under the sponsorship of Ambrose Bierce, a staff illustrator of portrait sketches at The San Francisco Examiner. In 1899 Mary Williams Davison moved to New York City and established a studio-residence on West Twenty-Fourth Street. She was hired by Joseph Pulitzer to publish her caricature drawings and interviews of celebrities under the pseudonym “Kate Carew” for his Sunday World and Evening World, divisions of the New York World. In 1901 she married the Australian journalist and playwright Henry Kellett Chambers. In September 1910 she gave birth to a son, Colin Chambers, and the following year divorced her husband for his infidelities with the Mexican writer Maria Cristina Mena.

In 1911 she was sent to Europe by the Sunday World to publish the series Kate Carew Abroad. She traveled to London and Paris, where she interviewed Pablo Picasso and Rostand, John Galsworthy, George Moore, Émile Zola, Bret Harte (who happened to be in England), Lady Sackville-West, and many others. She wrote about 500 pieces for New York City newspapers and later for the Tatler (London), The Patrician, and Eve.

She was among those who visited `Abdu'l-Bahá, then head of the Baháʼí Faith, during his visit to the States and travelled with him for a number of days. On April 16, 1912, with Mary Williams still travelling with him, `Abdu'l-Bahá visited the Bowery. Mary Williams noted that she was impressed with `Abdu'l-Bahá's generosity of spirit in bringing people of social standing to the Bowery as well as that he then gave money to the poor rather than accepting it.

She became severely ill in December 1913 and returned to the States after surgery. While conducting interviews in Hollywood for the London Strand Magazine she met and married the British-born John A. Reed in December 1916. The following spring they moved to Carmel-by-the-Sea, California. She became an exhibiting member of the Carmel Arts & Crafts Club and staged a solo exhibit at Monterey’s Hotel Del Monte with over two dozen caricatures, including Woodrow Wilson, Mark Twain, and Ethel Barrymore, to rave reviews. Beginning in the early 1920s, when a severe wrist injury temporarily limited her career, the Reeds resided primarily at Guernsey in the Channel Islands or in France. She exhibited at the Salon des Artistes of Paris in 1924 and 1928; on the latter date she displayed Farm at Hyeres. In June 1938 they returned to the Monterey Peninsula. John Reed died in June 1941 at a sanatorium in St. Helena. Mary Williams returned to Monterey in the spring of 1943, purchased the former home of the painter Lucy Valentine Pierce, and devoted herself to seascapes and landscapes. She died at the age of 91 in a Pacific Grove rest home and is buried in Oakland.
