= The Black Cat (1941 film) =

1941 film by Albert S. Rogell

- Theatrical release poster
- Directed by: Albert S. Rogell
- Screenplay by: Robert Lees; Frederic I. Rinaldo; Eric Taylor; Robert Neville
- Based on: The Black Cat; 1843 story by Edgar Allan Poe
- Starring: Basil Rathbone; Hugh Herbert; Broderick Crawford; Bela Lugosi
- Cinematography: Stanley Cortez
- Edited by: Ted Kent
- Production company: Universal Pictures Company, Inc.
- Distributed by: Universal Pictures Company, Inc.
- Release date: 2 May 1941
- Running time: 70 minutes
- Country: United States
- Language: English
- Budget: $176,000

The Black Cat is a 1941 American comedy horror and mystery film directed by Albert S. Rogell and starring Basil Rathbone. The film was a stylistic hybrid, inspired by comedy "Old Dark House" films of the era as well as the 1843 short story "The Black Cat" by Edgar Allan Poe. It stars Basil Rathbone as Montague Hartley, the head of a greedy family who await the death of Henrietta Winslow (played by Cecilia Loftus) so that they can inherit her fortune. When she is found murdered, an investigation begins into who might be the culprit. Alongside Rathbone and Loftus, the film's cast includes Hugh Herbert, Broderick Crawford, and Bela Lugosi.

Initially set to start filming in January 1941, the film was delayed twice with the script being re-written by comedy writers Robert Lees and Frederic I. Rinaldo and having some last minute cast changes. It officially began filming on February 17 and finished filming on March 10. It was released to indifferent reviews from The Hollywood Reporter, The Film Daily and The New York Daily News.

== Plot ==
Henrietta Winslow, a cat lady, calls her family to her estate. Seeing their arrival, realtor Gil Smith and antiques dealer Mr. Penny sneak onto the estate. She leaves half her fortune to her niece Myrna, the other half to her granddaughter Margaret, and the estate to her granddaughter Elaine. Myrna's husband Montague gets $10,000. The interlopers are brought inside after Gil's cat allergy exposes their presence.

Henrietta is furious when she realizes that Montague sent for them and intends to break up the estate. Gil prevents Henrietta from being poisoned. She then reveals that the money will not be distributed until the servant Abigail also dies. That night, one of Henrietta's cats is poisoned. She cremates it, and is herself killed. Abigail orders everyone off the estate, but they refuse.

Montague's son Richard discovers that he is having an affair with Margaret and threatens to tell Myrna. Abigail is attacked, and Gil suspects that secret passages are allowing the murderer to move around. Gil and Elaine investigate several nighttime disturbances, all of which are red herrings. Abigail is found murdered. Gil, Montague, and Richard find Myrna hanged, but save her life. Gil and Montague chase the butler, but Elaine accuses Myrna of faking her attack. Myrna drags Elaine to the furnace, but Gil saves her. A black cat knocks over a candle, setting Myrna on fire. Afterwards, Elaine lets Gil sell the estate.

== Cast ==
- Basil Rathbone as Montague Hartley
- Hugh Herbert as Mr. Penny
- Broderick Crawford as Hubert "A. Gilmore" Smith
- Bela Lugosi as Eduardo Vigos
- Anne Gwynne as Elaine
- Gale Sondergaard as Abigail Doone
- Cecilia Loftus as Henrietta Winslow
- Claire Dodd as Margaret Gordon
- John Eldredge as Stanley Borden
- Gladys Cooper as Myrna Hartley
- Alan Ladd as Richard Hartley
- Erville Alderson as Doctor Williams (uncredited)

== Production ==
In 1939, the production company Paramount Pictures had a hit film with their version of The Cat and the Canary, a film featuring an "old dark house" setting that was humorous with comedy star Bob Hope. Universal followed this film with an adaptation of Edgar Allan Poe's short story "The Black Cat", recycling the story to fit the mold of The Cat and the Canary. Screenwriters Eric Taylor and Robert Neville were hired to produce the script. Associate producer Burt Kelly brought in new writers on the film as he had done previously with The Invisible Woman, bringing in the writers of Hold That Ghost (Robert Lees and Frederic I. Rinaldo) to work on the script.

The film was initially given a $176,000 budget with director Albert S. Rogell signing on to direct on January 22, 1941, five days before production was set to start. Delays halted the beginning of the production until February 24. Several cast members were changed at the last minute before filming began, including Paul Cavanagh as Montague Hartley which went to Basil Rathbone. Production started on February 17 and finished on March 10.

== Release ==
The Black Cat was released by Universal Pictures on May 2, 1941. The authors of the books Universal Horrors noted that the film was marketed in advertising and trailers as an all-out horror film, despite its overt comedic tone. The Black Cat was re-released theatrically after Paramount's success with This Gun for Hire in 1942 which also featured Alan Ladd. Following the release of the film, Rathbone was to be teamed with the writers Lees and Rinaldo for one more project in an Abbott and Costello comedy titled By Candlelight which did not go into development.

== Reception ==
"I hated doing the thing. It was beneath me".

— Gale Sondergaard on The Black Cat

From contemporary reviews, an anonymous reviewer in The Hollywood Reporter noted that Al Rogell directed the film "with a keen eye towards giving all possible comedy in the piece, and he misses no trick in underscoring the laughs". The Film Daily noted the direction and screenplay as good and that "the cast is fine, the horror element in the story is sufficient". One Harrison's Reports reviewer found the film was "somewhat slow in getting started; as a matter of fact, it is not until the closing scenes where the murderer's identity becomes known and the heroine's life is endangered that the action is really exciting".

From retrospective reviews, the authors of the book Universal Horrors stated that the primary interest in the film how it was "squandering a fine cast and the considerable skills of a top technical crew on bottom-drawer material. That such a patchwork script ever made it out of the story department in the first place to become the most polished genre piece Universal produced in 1941 (including The Wolf Man) is amazing". Hal Erickson of AllMovie declared the film as "Hardly one of the classic Universal horror efforts", noting its primary interest was "the advantage of some spook camerawork, courtesy of Stanley Cortez".
