= Mrs. Pollifax-Spy =

1971 comedy film by Leslie H. Martinson

- Film poster by Frank Frazetta
- Directed by: Leslie H. Martinson
- Written by: Dorothy Gilman (novel) "C. A. McKnight" (actually Rosalind Russell) (screenplay)
- Starring: Rosalind Russell
- Cinematography: Joseph Biroc
- Edited by: Fred Bohanan; Gene Milford
- Music by: Lalo Schifrin
- Distributed by: United Artists
- Release dates: February 17, 1971 (Premiere); May 12, 1971
- Running time: 110 min.
- Country: United States
- Language: English

Mrs. Pollifax–Spy is a 1971 American comedy film directed by Leslie H. Martinson, starring Rosalind Russell, Darren McGavin, and Nehemiah Persoff. It was released by United Artists. Russell wrote the screenplay for the film, which she adapted from the novel The Unexpected Mrs. Pollifax by Dorothy Gilman. Russell used the pen name "C. A. McKnight," which was taken from her mother's maiden name. It was Russell's last role in a theatrically released film.

== Plot ==
Mrs. Emily Pollifax, a widow from New Jersey, volunteers to be a spy for the CIA, believing she is "expendable" now that her children are grown. Being just what the agency needed (someone who looks and acts completely unlike a spy), Mrs. Pollifax is assigned to simple courier duty to pick up a book in Mexico City. However, things do not unfold as planned. She is kidnapped and finds herself imprisoned in communist Albania, and must use her wits to escape.

== Cast ==
- Rosalind Russell as Mrs. Pollifax
- Darren McGavin as Farrell
- Nehemiah Persoff as Berisha
- Harold Gould as Nexhdet
- Albert Paulsen as Perdido

== Release ==
The film had its premiere in London on February 17, 1971. It premiered in the United States on March 11, 1971, in Des Moines.
