= How to Behave =

- Directed by: Arthur Ripley
- Written by: Robert Lees; Frederic I. Rinaldo; Robert Benchley
- Starring: Robert Benchley
- Narrated by: Robert Benchley
- Distributed by: Metro-Goldwyn-Mayer
- Release date: 1936
- Running time: 10 minutes
- Country: United States
- Language: English

How to Behave is a short film released through MGM Studios starring Robert Benchley. The short, released in 1936, spoofs social etiquette films and norms of the time.
