= Arthur Ripley =

American screenwriter (1897–1961)

- Born: January 12, 1897; New York City, USA
- Died: February 13, 1961 (aged 64)

Arthur DeWitt Ripley (January 12, 1897 – February 13, 1961) was an American film screenwriter, editor, producer, and director.

== Biography ==
In 1923, he joined the Mack Sennett studio as a comedy writer. In the 1920s, he worked closely with Frank Capra churning out screenplays for many movies. After breaking with Capra and the Sennett studio, Ripley again returned to being a gag-writer, screenwriter, and occasional director, making short films with such comedians as W. C. Fields and Edgar Kennedy. His directorial work in the 1940s, Voice in the Wind (1944) and The Chase (1946), were both critical successes, but neither film was a box office hit.

Ripley entered the world of academia, helping to establish the Film Center at U.C.L.A. while also working occasionally on TV. Ripley returned to directing one more time, at the request of Robert Mitchum, for Thunder Road (1958) before returning to U.C.L.A. and working until his death in 1961.

== Selected filmography ==
- Alias Jimmy Valentine (1920) starring Bert Lytell
- Life's Darn Funny (1921)
- A Lady of Quality (1924)
- Hooked at the Altar (1926) short
- The Chaser (1928)
- Heart Trouble (1928)
- Barnum Was Right (1929)
- Captain of the Guard (1930)
- Crimes Square (1931) short
- A Wrestler's Bride (1933) short
- The Pharmacist (1933) short with W. C. Fields
- The Barber Shop (1933) short with W. C. Fields
- Counsel on De Fence (1934) short
- In the Dog House (1934) short
- Shivers (1934) short
- South Seasickness (1935) short
- The Leather Necker (1935) short
- Edgar Hamlet (1935) short
- In Love at 40 (1935) short
- Happy Tho' Married (1935) short
- Gasoloons (1936) short
- Will Power (1936) short
- How to Behave (1936) short
- How to Train a Dog (1936) short
- I Met My Love Again (1938)
- Scrappily Married (1940) short
- Twincuplets (1940) short
- Voice in the Wind (1944)
- The Chase (1946)
- Thunder Road (1958)
