= Henry Ginsberg =

- Born: April 29, 1897
- Died: June 10, 1979 (aged 82); Palm Beach, Florida, U.S.
- Known for: Head of production at Paramount Studios

Henry Ginsberg (April 29, 1897 – June 10, 1979) was an American film studio executive who was head of production at Paramount Studios in the late 1940s and early 1950s. He subsequently produced Giant (1956).

Born to a Jewish family, he arrived at Paramount in 1940 and replaced Buddy DeSylva as head of production in 1944. He resigned in 1950, after leading the studio during a particularly successful period.

Ginsberg died in Palm Beach, Florida on June 10, 1979, at the age of 82.
