= Dorothy Gilman =

American novelist

- Born: Dorothy Edith Gilman; June 25, 1923; New Brunswick, New Jersey, U.S.
- Died: February 2, 2012 (aged 88); Rye Brook, New York, U.S.
- Occupation: Novelist
- Writing career
- Notable work: The Mrs. Pollifax series

Dorothy Edith Gilman (June 25, 1923 – February 2, 2012) was an American writer. She is best known for the Mrs. Pollifax series of spy novels, about spy and grandmother Emily Pollifax, who becomes a spy in her 60s. In 2010, Gilman was the Mystery Writers of America's Grand Master Award recipient.

== Biography ==
Dorothy Gilman was born in New Brunswick, New Jersey, to minister James Bruce and Essa (Starkweather) Gilman. She started writing when she was 9. At 11, she competed against 10- to 16-year-olds in a story contest and won first place. Planning to write and illustrate books for children, she attended Pennsylvania Academy of the Fine Arts from 1940 to 1945. She married teacher Edgar A. Butters, Jr. September 15, 1945; they divorced in 1965. The couple had two children, Christopher and Jonathan. Gilman attended the University of Pennsylvania and Art Students' League from 1963 to 1964. She was Unitarian.

Gilman worked as an art teacher and telephone operator before becoming an author. She wrote children's stories for more than ten years under the name Dorothy Gilman Butters and then began writing adult novels about Mrs. Pollifax, a retired grandmother who becomes a CIA agent. The Mrs. Pollifax series made Gilman famous.

Gilman's life is strongly reflected in her writing. She traveled extensively, and her travels became the settings for her Mrs. Pollifax books. In the 1970s, she moved to a property in a small town in Nova Scotia where she grew most of her own vegetables and herbs. This period was the focus of her memoir, A New Kind of Country. Her knowledge of medicinal herbs informed several of her stories, including A Nun in the Closet and Thale's Folly. Thale's Folly is one of her few books featuring a male protagonist; most of her books feature strong women having adventures around the world. In addition to Nova Scotia, Gilman spent much of her life in Connecticut, Maine, and New Mexico.

In 2010 Gilman was awarded the annual Grand Master Award by the Mystery Writers of America.

In 2012, she died at age 88 of complications of Alzheimer's disease.

== Works ==
=== As Dorothy Gilman Butters ===
Under her married name, Dorothy Gilman Butters, she wrote books for young adults (except as noted) beginning in the late 1940s:

- Enchanted Caravan (1949) (ASIN B0006ary4y)
- Carnival Gypsy (1950) (ASIN B000jkb0oq)
- Ragamuffin Alley (1951) (ASIN B0006astpm)
- The Calico Year (1953) (ASIN B000gabx14)
- Four Party Line (1954) (ASIN B001k36208)
- Papa Dolphin's Table (1955; for children) (ASIN B000moc1qk)
- Girl in Buckskin (1956) (ISBN 978-0-449-70380-9)
- Heartbreak Street (1958) (ASIN B00209ktic)
- Witch's Silver (1959) (ASIN B0006avz6m)
- Masquerade (1961) (ASIN B0006ax1im)
- Heart's Design (Masquerade Republished) (1963) (ASIN B000ts8al4)
- Ten Leagues to Boston Town (1963) (ASIN B0006ay2v2)
- The Bells of Freedom (1963) (ASIN B001u11ad4)

She also contributed to Good Housekeeping, Jack and Jill, Redbook, Ladies' Home Journal, Cosmopolitan, The Writer, and other magazines.

She also contributed a chapter to the book, On Creative Writing, edited by Paul Engle (1964).

=== The Mrs. Pollifax series ===
Gilman began writing under her maiden name for the first book of the Mrs. Pollifax series, The Unexpected Mrs. Pollifax. The heroine, the eccentric Emily Pollifax, is a 60-ish, bored, garden-clubbing grandmother, and widow. Considering her life without real purpose, and after briefly contemplating suicide, she presents herself to the CIA, offering to serve as an agent. Initially recruited through a misunderstanding, she is excited, and a bit clueless about her role, but she quickly adapts to an unfortunate turn of events, and displays the common sense and grit that will guide her through future intrigues.

The series, which ended in 2000 with Mrs. Pollifax Unveiled, consists of fast-paced escapades filled with danger and intrigue in Mexico, Turkey, Thailand, China, Morocco, Zambia, Sicily, and elsewhere.

- The Unexpected Mrs. Pollifax (1966) (ISBN 978-0-449-20828-1)
- The Amazing Mrs. Pollifax (1970) (ISBN 978-0-449-20912-7)
- The Elusive Mrs. Pollifax (1971) (ISBN 978-0-449-21523-4)
- A Palm for Mrs. Pollifax (1973) (ISBN 978-0-449-20864-9)
- Mrs. Pollifax on Safari (1977) (ISBN 978-0-449-21524-1)
- Mrs. Pollifax on the China Station (1983) (ISBN 978-0-449-20840-3)
- Mrs. Pollifax and the Hong Kong Buddha (1985) (ISBN 978-0-449-20983-7)
- Mrs. Pollifax and the Golden Triangle (1988) (ISBN 978-0-449-21515-9)
- Mrs. Pollifax and the Whirling Dervish (1990) (ISBN 978-0-449-14760-3)
- Mrs. Pollifax and the Second Thief (1993) (ISBN 978-0-449-14905-8)
- Mrs. Pollifax Pursued (1995) (ISBN 978-0-449-14956-0)
- Mrs. Pollifax and the Lion Killer (1996) (ISBN 978-0-449-15004-7)
- Mrs. Pollifax, Innocent Tourist (1997) (ISBN 978-0-449-18336-6)
- Mrs. Pollifax Unveiled (2000) (ISBN 978-0-449-00670-2)

=== Other books ===
Additional books she wrote under the name Dorothy Gilman:

- Uncertain Voyage (1967) (ISBN 978-0-449-21628-6)
- Clairvoyant Countess (1975) (ISBN 978-0-449-21318-6)
- A Nun in the Closet (1975), Winner of the Catholic Book Award (ISBN 978-0-449-21167-0)
- A New Kind of Country (1978) (reissued by Fawcett in 1989) (ISBN 978-0-449-21627-9); (memoir), memoir of her life in a Nova Scotia village
- The Tightrope Walker (1979) (ISBN 978-0-449-21177-9)
- The Maze in the Heart of the Castle (1983; for young adults) (ISBN 978-0-449-70398-4)
- Incident at Badamya (1989) (ISBN 978-0-449-21721-4)
- Caravan (1992) (ISBN 978-0-345-49237-1)
- Thale's Folly (1999) (ISBN 978-0-449-00365-7)
- Kaleidoscope: A Countess Karitska Novel (2002) (ISBN 978-0-345-44820-0)

== Film/TV adaptations ==
The Unexpected Mrs. Pollifax was filmed by United Artists in 1970 as Mrs. Pollifax-Spy starring Rosalind Russell. Angela Lansbury starred in the made-for-TV movie The Unexpected Mrs. Pollifax in 1999.

== Sources ==
- Contemporary Authors Online, Gale, 2006. Reproduced in Biography Resource Center. Farmington Hills, Mich.: Thomson Gale Fan website
