= Ralph S. Hurst =

American set decorator

- Born: February 18, 1917; Georgia
- Died: July 26, 1972 (aged 55); Ventura, California
- Occupation: Set decorator
- Years active: 1937-1972

Ralph S. Hurst (February 18, 1917 – July 26, 1972) was an American set decorator. He was nominated for an Academy Award in the category Best Art Direction for the film Giant.

== Selected filmography ==
- Giant (1956)
