= The Pharmacist (1933 film) =

- Directed by: Arthur Ripley
- Written by: W.C. Fields
- Produced by: Mack Sennett
- Starring: W.C. Fields
- Cinematography: Frank B. Good; George Unholz
- Production company: Mack Sennett Productions
- Distributed by: Paramount Pictures
- Release date: April 21, 1933
- Running time: 20 minutes
- Country: United States
- Language: English

The Pharmacist is a 1933 American pre-Code comedy film directed by Arthur Ripley and starring W. C. Fields.

== Plot ==
Mr. Dilweg, a weary but patient pharmacist, struggles to balance his demanding life, enduring a nagging wife, self-absorbed daughters, and an endless stream of difficult customers. To cope with his frustrations, he finds solace in frequent martinis while secretly selling bootleg liquor under the counter to keep his business afloat—despite the watchful eye of the local sheriff.

His day begins at the firehouse playing cards before returning home for a chaotic family dinner. His younger daughter, Priscilla, throws tantrums, while his older daughter, Ooleota, is absorbed in a never-ending phone call with her boyfriend, Cuthbert Smith. As if his home life weren’t stressful enough, his pharmacy becomes a revolving door of absurd interruptions: a man needing a single postage stamp, a customer ordering cough drops for delivery, an elderly woman searching for a restroom, a federal agent looking for illegal liquor, a fainting customer, and, in the ultimate escalation, a gunman taking refuge in the store during a shootout with police.

The chaos culminates when a seemingly oblivious customer using the pay phone knocks the gunman unconscious with the receiver—only for Dilweg to realize that the unexpected hero is none other than his daughter's boyfriend, Cuthbert Smith. The film blends farcical comedy with social satire, portraying the overwhelmed pharmacist as a man beset by both family and professional obligations, navigating an absurdly tumultuous day with weary endurance.

== Cast ==
- W.C. Fields as Mr. Dilweg
- Marjorie Kane as Priscilla Dilweg
- Elise Cavanna as Mrs. Grace Dilweg
- Grady Sutton as Cuthbert Smith
- Lorena Carr as Ooleota Dilweg

== Reception ==
On review aggregator website Rotten Tomatoes, the film holds 100% approval rating based on 5 reviews, with an average rating of 7.3/10.
