= The Treasurer's Report =

1928 film

- Directed by: Thomas Chalmers
- Written by: Robert Benchley
- Produced by: William Fox
- Starring: Robert Benchley
- Distributed by: Fox Film Corporation
- Release date: March 12, 1928
- Running time: 10 minutes
- Country: United States
- Language: English

The Treasurer's Report (1928) is a comedy sketch, made into a short film, written and performed by Robert Benchley. The film, made in the then-new Fox Movietone, documents an assistant treasurer of an organization struggling to present its yearly report. This was the first of Benchley's 46 comedy short films, with six made for Fox, one each for Universal Pictures and RKO Radio Pictures, 29 for Metro-Goldwyn-Mayer, and nine for Paramount Pictures.

The short was adapted from a stage scene of the same name that Benchley wrote and performed for No Sirree!, a revue staged in April 1922 by Benchley and other members of the Algonquin Round Table.

A number of Round Tablers were contributing new material for the revue and Benchley wanted to do his part, but as often happened he procrastinated. According to fellow Round Tabler Donald Ogden Stewart, Benchley didn't start writing the sketch until about a week before the revue, and then only scribbled rough notes on the back of an envelope (Benchley would not commit a full script to paper until 1930). Benchley's disjointed parody so delighted those in attendance that Irving Berlin hired Benchley in 1923 to deliver the Report as part of Berlin's Music Box Revue for $500 a week. The Report was later filmed in 1928 and kicked off a second career for Benchley in Hollywood.

Benchley would continue to perform the sketch periodically throughout his life, with his final Report delivered on October 27, 1945 (just a few weeks prior to his death) for CBS Radio's Report to the Nation.

The film was included in the compilation Robert Benchley and the Knights of the Algonquin.
