= Fred Bohanan =

American film and story editor

- Born: November 29, 1907
- Died: June 15, 1980 (aged 72); North Hollywood, California, U.S.
- Occupation(s): Film and story editor

Fred Bohanan (November 29, 1907 – June 15, 1980) was an American film and story editor. He was nominated for an Academy Award in the category Best Film Editing for the film Giant.

== Selected filmography ==
- Giant (1956; co-nominated with William Hornbeck and Philip W. Anderson)
