= How to Sleep =

- Directed by: Nick Grinde
- Written by: Robert Benchley
- Produced by: Jack Chertok
- Starring: Robert Benchley
- Narrated by: Robert Benchley
- Distributed by: MGM
- Release date: September 14, 1935
- Running time: 11 minutes
- Country: United States
- Language: English

How to Sleep is a short comedy film written by and starring humorist Robert Benchley. Filmed and released by MGM in 1935 (as part of their "Miniatures" series), it features Benchley as a narrator as well as film subject, discussing four parts of sleep—causes, methods, avoiding sleep, and waking up.

== Plot ==
Robert Benchley as the Lecturer introduces the topic of how to sleep, explaining that since sleep is caused by blood leaving the brain, the best way to induce sleep is to engage in activities that draw blood away from the brain. He first suggests a pine-scented bath, narrating over footage of himself as the Sleeper dipping a toe in. However, the outside voiceover narration quickly turns into the Sleeper's internal monologue as he thinks better of the bath. The film then follows the Sleeper through other traditional sleep aids, such as a drink of warm milk and counting sheep, all of which go humorously awry.

In the next section of the film, the Lecturer explains several nuisances which can prevent sleep, such as ambient noises, tangled bedsheets, and the effects of alcohol, with the Sleeper suffering each in turn. The Lecturer then outlines the various poses taken by the Sleeper over the course of a night, commenting on each and remarking that with so much tossing and turning, "it makes one wonder what the idea is of getting into bed at all".

Finally, the Sleeper is awoken by a late-night thirst and unsuccessfully tries to stay half-asleep while stumbling to the bathroom for a drink of water. The Lecturer notes that he will remain awake until just before his alarm clock rings, when he finally drifts off just in time to be awoken. With the ringing of the clock, the Lecturer (who himself was starting to drowse) announces the end of the program.

== Cast ==
Robert Benchley as Lecturer

== Production ==
The production was inspired by a Mellon Institute study on sleep commissioned by the Simmons Mattress Company. It was filmed in two days, and featured Benchley as both the narrator and sleeper, the latter a role Benchley claimed was "not much of a strain, as [he] was in bed most of the time." Benchley was in fact a last-minute participant. As his son Nathaniel Benchley recalled, "How to Sleep was supposed to be a Pete Smith short, but Pete Smith was sick. It was going to be a thing on Simmons mattresses; they had this film of quick shots showing how many positions you take during an evening's sleep. They tried to have somebody else do it, who couldn't make it, and they finally came to my father and asked if he would try to do it. That's what finally wound up being How to Sleep."

The film was well received in previews and was promoted heavily, with a still from the film being used in Simmons advertisements. The only group not pleased was the Mellon Institute, which did not approve of the studio mocking their study.

How to Sleep won an Academy Award for Best Live-Action Short Subject in 1935. MGM kicked off an entire series of situation-comedy reels, each 10 minutes in length, showing Benchley giving mock-instructional lectures (How to Be a Detective, How to Rest, etc.) or coping with household situations (An Evening Alone, Home Movies, etc.).

How to Sleep is included as an extra on the DVD of the 1935 Marx Brothers feature film, A Night at the Opera, and is also available on the DVD set The Robert Benchley Miniatures Collection.

== See also ==
- List of American films of 1935

== Notes ==
- Billy Altman, Laughter's Gentle Soul: The Life of Robert Benchley. (New York City: W. W. Norton, 1997. ISBN 0-393-03833-5).
- Nathaniel Benchley, Robert Benchley, a biography. (New York City, McGraw-Hill, 1955).
