= Mary Ann Edwards =

American actress (1931–2021)

- Born: December 27, 1931; Georgetown, Texas, U.S.
- Died: July 31, 2021 (aged 89); Valencia, California, U.S.
- Education: University of Texas
- Occupation: Actress
- Spouses: Ralph Stirling Hodges (m. 1954, divorced) James P. Hart (m. 1963; died 2010)

Mary Ann Edwards (December 27, 1931 – July 31, 2021) was an American actress.

== Early years ==
Edwards was born on December 27, 1931, in Georgetown Texas, the daughter of Mr. and Mrs. Marvin Edwards. During her high school years, she was a rodeo queen and a majorette. After graduating from Georgetown High School, she attended the University of Texas (UT), majoring in drama and acting in theatrical productions. She also graduated from a modeling school and worked as a model for photographers and fashion shows.

In 1952, judges in a contest sponsored by Modern Screen Magazine selected her as one of 10 winners in a year-long national contest. She and the other young women were supposed to make their film debuts together in Size 12, an RKO production, but the studio postponed production of the film, enabling her to continue her studies. Back at UT, she acted primarily on radio and won the university's Radio House Best Actress Award.

== Career ==
In 1953, Edwards was one of six young women selected to be "T-Venuses" who would appear on the NBC television programs The Colgate Comedy Hour, All-Star Revue, and The Bob Hope Show. Jimmy Durante, Groucho Marx, and Harpo Marx selected the six from approximately 200 contestants. When RKO's production problems were resolved, Edwards appeared in the film Son of Sinbad (1955). She also appeared on Eddie Fisher's, George Gobel's, and Lawrence Welk's TV shows and made commercials.

In 1956, Edwards had a program on KLAS-TV in Las Vegas, a show that was named the "most popular multi-weekly show in Nevada". The program's weather reports provided a way for Edwards to use her knowledge of meteorology, which she had studied at UT. She portrayed Adarene Clinch in the film Giant. She initially was hired to coach actors in the film on how to talk like Texans, but director George Stevens put her in the film instead.

In 1962, Edwards joined the Pat Holmes Agency, a theatrical artist management venture in Sherman Oaks, California. Andrews was in charge of the children's department and TV commercials for the agency, which was composed entirely of women—an unusual characteristic for talent agencies at that time.

== Other accomplishments ==
Edwards was queen of the Williamson County Centennial Rodeo, sweetheart of Wolters Air Force Base, and "Golden Girl", representing Hollywood for the Hollywood Chamber of Commerce's golden anniversary. She also was named Most Beautiful Cowgirl of the Bandera Stampede and Miss Golden Gloves for Austin.

== Personal life and death ==
Edwards married Ralph Stirling Hodges on July 20, 1954, in Georgetown, Texas. He was a former child actor who became a television executive. They divorced, and in 1963 she married James P. Hart. They remained wed until 2010, when he died. She died on July 31, 2021, in Valencia, California, at the age of 89.
