= Gluyas Williams =

American cartoonist

Gluyas Williams ca.1940s

Gluyas Williams (July 23, 1888 – February 13, 1982) was an American cartoonist, notable for his contributions to The New Yorker and other major magazines. He was also syndicated in a number of newspapers, including the Boston Globe.

Born in San Francisco, California, son of Robert and Virginia Williams, his name (pronounced GLUE-yass) reflected his Cornish ancestry. He received a Bachelor of Arts degree from Harvard in 1911. In college, he was a member of the Harvard Lampoon.

His cartoons employed a clean black-and-white style and often dealt with prevailing themes of the day such as Prohibition. His strip, as of 1924, was titled “The World At Its Worst.” His work appeared in Life, Collier's, Century and The New Yorker. He was also syndicated to such newspapers as The Plain Dealer. According to his obituary in The New York Times (15 February 1982, p. D7), by the time he retired in 1953, about five million regular readers had seen his cartoons, which ran in more than 70 newspapers.

During the 1940s, he worked in Boston at 194 Boylston Street. When he died at the age of 93, he was living in Newton, Massachusetts.

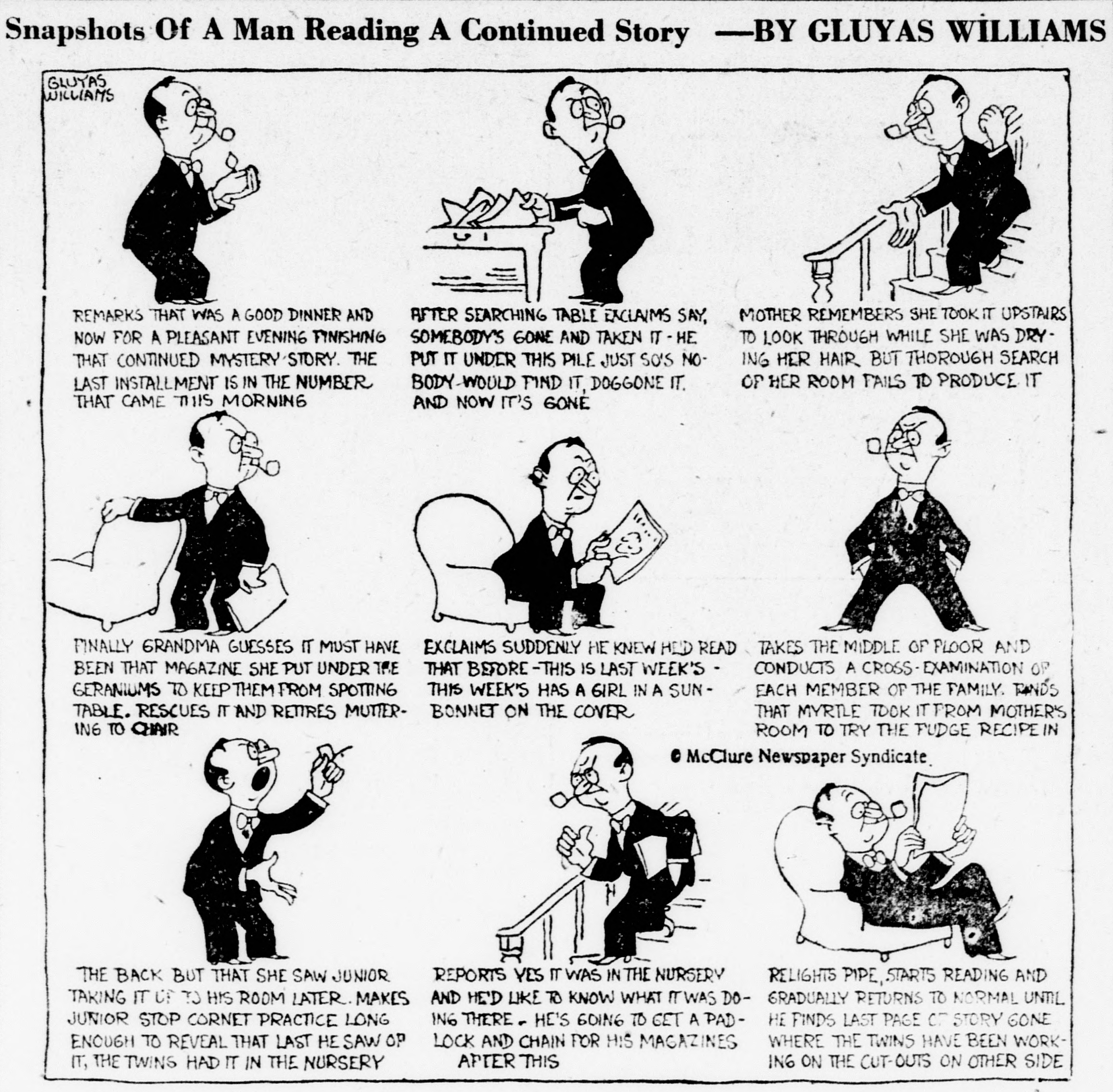
Snapshots of a Man Reading a Continued Story, by Williams (1924)

== Reprints ==
Published collections of his work include The Gluyas Williams Book (1929), Fellow Citizens (1940) and The Gluyas Williams Gallery (1957). He also illustrated books by Robert Benchley and Father of the Bride by Edward Streeter.

== Family ==
Williams' sister was Kate Carew.
