= Robert Benchley =

American writer and actor (1889–1945)

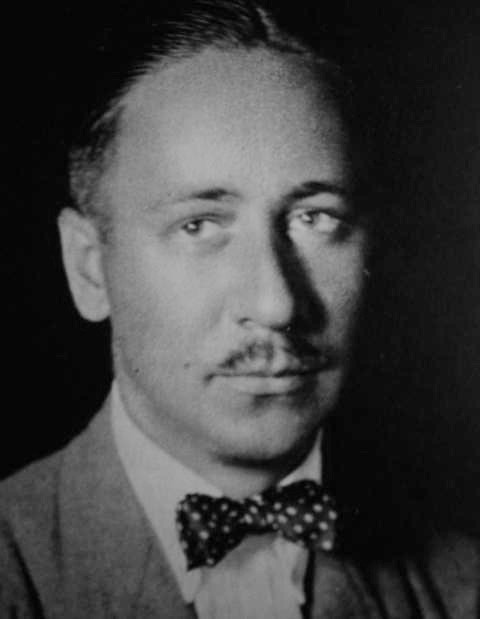
- Benchley photographed for Vanity Fair
- Born: Robert Charles Benchley; September 15, 1889; Worcester, Massachusetts, U.S.
- Died: November 21, 1945 (aged 56); New York City, U.S.
- Occupations: Writer, critic, actor, film director
- Spouse: Gertrude Darling (m. 1914)
- Children: 2, including Nathaniel
- Relatives: Peter Benchley and Nat Benchley (grandsons)
- Writing career
- Years active: 1914–1945
- Genres: Deadpan, parody, surreal humor

Robert Charles Benchley (September 15, 1889 – November 21, 1945) was an American humorist, newspaper columnist and actor. From his beginnings at The Harvard Lampoon while attending Harvard University, through his many years writing essays and articles for Vanity Fair and The New Yorker and his acclaimed short films, Benchley's style of humor brought him respect and success during his life, from his peers at the Algonquin Round Table in New York City to contemporaries in the burgeoning film industry.

Benchley is remembered best for his contributions to the magazine The New Yorker; his essays for that publication, whether topical or absurdist, influenced many modern humorists. He also made a name for himself in Hollywood, when his short movie How to Sleep was a popular success and won Best Short Subject at the 1935 Academy Awards. He also made many memorable appearances acting in movies such as Alfred Hitchcock's Foreign Correspondent (1940) and Nice Girl? (1941). Also, Benchley appeared as himself in Walt Disney's behind-the-scenes movie, The Reluctant Dragon (1941). His legacy includes written work and numerous short movie appearances.

== Life and career ==
=== Early life ===
Robert Benchley was born on September 15, 1889, in Worcester, Massachusetts, the second son of Charles Henry Benchley and Maria Jane (Moran). They were of Welsh and Northern Irish (Protestant) ancestry, respectively, both from colonial stock. His brother Edmund was thirteen years older. Benchley was later known for writing elaborately fanciful autobiographical statements about himself (at one time asserting that he wrote A Tale of Two Cities before being buried at Westminster Abbey).

His father served with the Union army for two years during the Civil War and had a four-year hitch in the Navy before settling again in Worcester, marrying and working as a town clerk. Benchley's grandfather, Henry Wetherby Benchley, a member of the Massachusetts Senate and Lieutenant Governor during the mid-1850s, went to Houston, Texas and became an activist for the Underground Railroad for which he was arrested and jailed.

=== Brother Edmund's death ===
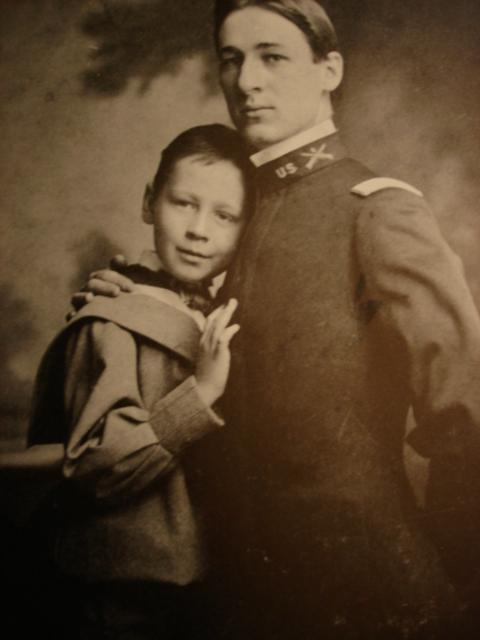
Robert with elder brother Edmund, who was killed in the Battle of San Juan Hill when Robert was age nine

Robert's older brother Edmund (born March 3, 1876) (Note: https://www.robertbenchley.org/sob/edmund.htm) was a fourth-year cadet at West Point in 1898 when his class was graduated early to support preparations for the Spanish–American War; he was killed July 1, 1898, at the Battle of San Juan Hill. When news reached the family, Maria's stunned reaction was to cry out, "Why couldn't it have been Robert?!"; accounts conflict as to whether Robert (who was nine years old at the time) heard this. (Note: https://archive.nytimes.com/www.nytimes.com/books/first/a/altman-laughter.html)

Edmund's fiancée Lillian Duryea, a wealthy heiress, doted on Robert for many years, and Edmund's death may have encouraged the pacifist sympathies present in Robert's writing. Additionally, because the news about Edmund had arrived during a July 4th celebration, Robert for the rest of his life associated fireworks with Edmund's death.

=== Meeting his wife ===
Robert Benchley met Gertrude Darling in high school in Worcester. They became engaged during his senior year at Harvard University, and they married in June 1914. Their first child, Nathaniel Benchley, was born a year later. A second son, Robert Benchley Jr., was born in 1919.

=== Education ===
Robert grew up and attended South High School in Worcester and was involved in academic and traveling theatrical productions during high school. Thanks to financial aid from his late brother's fiancée, Lillian Duryea, he could attend Phillips Exeter Academy in Exeter, New Hampshire for his final year of high school. Benchley reveled in the atmosphere at the academy, and he remained active in creative extracurricular activities, thereby damaging his academic credentials toward the end of his term.

Benchley enrolled at Harvard University in 1908, again with Duryea's financial help. He joined the Delta Upsilon fraternity in his first year, and continued to partake in the camaraderie that he had enjoyed at Phillips Exeter while still doing well in school. He did especially well in his English and government classes. His humor and style began to reveal themselves during this time: Benchley was often called upon to entertain his fraternity brothers, and his impressions of classmates and professors became very popular. His performances gave him some local fame, and most entertainment programs on campus and many off-campus meetings recruited Benchley's talents.

During his first two years at Harvard, Benchley worked with the publications Harvard Advocate and the Harvard Lampoon. He was elected to the Lampoon's board of directors in his third year. The election of Benchley was unusual, as he was the publication's art editor and the board positions typically fell to the foremost writers on the staff. The Lampoon position opened a number of other doors for Benchley, and he was quickly nominated to the Signet Society meeting club as well as becoming the only undergraduate member of the Boston Papyrus Club at the time.

Along with his duties at the Lampoon, Benchley acted in a number of theatrical productions, including Hasty Pudding productions of The Crystal Gazer and Below Zero. He also had the position of κροκόδιλος (Crocodilos) for the Pudding in 1912. Benchley kept these achievements in mind as he began to contemplate a career for himself after college. Charles Townsend Copeland, an English professor, recommended that Benchley become a writer, and Benchley and future Benchley illustrator Gluyas Williams from the Lampoon considered doing freelance work writing and illustrating theatrical reviews. Another English professor recommended that Benchley speak with the Curtis Publishing Company; but Benchley was initially against the idea, and ultimately accepted a job at a civil service office in Philadelphia. Owing to an academic failure during his senior year due to an illness, Benchley would not receive his Bachelor of Arts from Harvard until the completion of his credits in 1913. His shortcoming was the submission of a "scholarly paper"—which Benchley eventually rectified by a treatise on the U.S.–Canadian Fisheries Dispute, written from the point of view of a cod. He took a position with Curtis soon after he received his diploma.

=== Early professional career ===
Benchley did copy work for the Curtis Company during the summer following graduation, while doing other odd service jobs, such as translating French catalogs for the Boston Museum of Fine Arts. In September, he was hired by Curtis as a full-time staff member, preparing copy for its new house publication, Obiter Dicta. The first issue was criticized by management, who felt it was "too technical, too scattering, and wholly lacking in punch." Things did not improve for Benchley and Obiter Dicta, and a failed practical joke at a company banquet further strained the relationship between Benchley and his superiors. He continued his attempts to develop his own voice within the publication, but Benchley and Curtis were not a good match, and he eventually quit, as Curtis was considering eliminating Benchley's role and he had been offered a job in Boston with a better salary

Benchley had a number of similar jobs during the following years. His re-entry into public speaking followed the annual Harvard–Yale football game in 1914, where he presented a practical joke involving "Professor Soong" giving a question-and-answer session on football in Chinese. In what the local press dubbed "the Chinese professor caper," Soong was played by a Chinese-American who had lived in the United States for more than thirty years, and pretended to answer questions in Chinese while Benchley "translated". While his fame increased, Benchley continued with freelance work, which included his first paid piece for Vanity Fair in 1914, titled "Hints on Writing a Book," a parody of the non-fiction pieces then popular. While Benchley's pieces were bought by Vanity Fair from time to time, his work was sporadic, and he accepted a job with the New York Tribune.

Benchley started at the Tribune as a reporter. He was a very poor one, unable to get statements from people quoted in other papers, and eventually had greater success covering lectures around the city. He was promised a job with the Tribune's Sunday magazine when it launched, and he was transferred to the magazine's staff soon after he was hired, eventually becoming chief writer. He wrote two articles a week: the first a review of non-literary books, the other a feature-style article about whatever he wanted. The liberty gave his work new life, and the success of his pieces in the magazine convinced his editors to give him a signed byline column in the Tribune proper.

Benchley filled in for P. G. Wodehouse at Vanity Fair at the beginning of 1916, reviewing theatre in New York. This inspired staff at the Tribune magazine to creativity for articles (such as arranging for the producers of The Thirteenth Chair to cast Benchley as a corpse), but the situation at the magazine deteriorated as the pacifist Benchley became unhappy with the Tribune's rhetoric concerning World War I, and the Tribune editors were unhappy with the evolving style and irreverence of the magazine. In 1917, the Tribune terminated the magazine, and Benchley was out of work again. When a rumored vacancy for an editorial job at Vanity Fair failed to happen, Benchley decided he would continue freelancing, having made a name for himself at the magazine.

This freelancing attempt did not start out well, with Benchley selling just one piece to Vanity Fair and accumulating countless rejections in two months. When a position as press agent for Broadway producer William A. Brady was offered, Benchley accepted it, against the advice of many of his peers. This experience was a poor one, as Brady was extremely difficult to work for. Benchley resigned to become a publicity director for the federal government's Aircraft Board at the beginning of 1918. His experience there was not much better, and when an opportunity was offered to return to the Tribune with new editorial management, Benchley accepted it.

At the Tribune, Benchley, along with new editor Ernest Gruening, was in charge of a twelve-page pictorial supplement titled the Tribune Graphic. The two were given a good deal of freedom, but Benchley's coverage of the war and emphasis on African-American regiments as well as provocative pictorials about lynching in the southern United States earned him and Gruening scrutiny from management. Amid accusations that both were pro-German (the United States was fighting Germany at the time), Benchley tendered his resignation in a terse letter, citing the lack of "rational proof that Dr. Gruening was guilty of...charges made against him..." and management's attempts to "smirch the character and the newspaper career of the first man in three years who has been able to make the Tribune look like a newspaper".

Benchley was forced to take a publicity job with the Liberty Loan program, and he continued to freelance until Collier's magazine offered him an associate editor job. Benchley mentioned this offer to Vanity Fair to see if they would match it, as he felt Vanity Fair was the better magazine, and Vanity Fair offered him the job of managing editor. He accepted and began work there in 1919.

An influence upon Benchley's early professional career was the admiration and friendship of the Canadian economist, academic, and humorist Dr. Stephen Leacock. Leacock closely followed the increasing body of Benchley's published humor and wit, and began correspondence between them. He admitted to occasional borrowing of a Benchley topic for his own writings. Eventually, he began lobbying gently for Benchley to compile his columns into book form, and, in 1921, was delighted when the result of his nagging—Of All Things—was published. The British edition of the book included a Leacock introduction, and Benchley, for his part—in a tribute to Leacock—later said he read everything Leacock ever wrote.

=== Vanity Fair and its aftermath ===
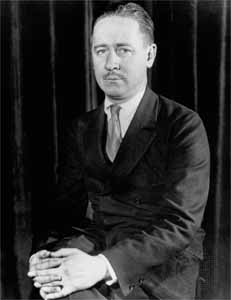
Benchley circa 1935

Benchley began at Vanity Fair with fellow Harvard Lampoon and Hasty Pudding Theatricals alumnus Robert Emmet Sherwood and future friend and collaborator Dorothy Parker, who had taken over theatre criticism from P. G. Wodehouse years earlier. The format of Vanity Fair fit Benchley's style very well, allowing his columns to have a humorous style, often as parodies. Benchley's work was published typically twice a month. Some of Benchley's columns, featuring a character he created, were attributed to his pseudonym Brighton Perry, but he took credit for most of them himself. Sherwood, Parker, and Benchley became friendly, often having long lunches at the Algonquin Hotel. When the editorial managers went on a European journey, the three took advantage of the situation, writing articles mocking the local theatre establishment and offering parodic commentary on a variety of topics, such as the effect of Canadian ice hockey on United States fashion. This worried Sherwood, as he felt it could jeopardize his forthcoming raise.

The situation at Vanity Fair deteriorated upon management's return. They distributed a memo forbidding the discussion of salaries in an attempt to control the staff. Benchley, Parker, and Sherwood responded with a memo of their own, followed by placards around their necks detailing their exact salaries for all to see. Management attempted to issue "tardy slips" for staff who were late. On one of these, Benchley wrote, in very small handwriting, an elaborate excuse involving a herd of elephants on 44th Street. These issues contributed to a general deterioration of morale in the offices, culminating in Parker's termination, allegedly due to complaints by the producers of the plays she criticized in her theatrical reviews. Upon learning of her termination, Benchley tendered his own resignation. It was mentioned in Time by Alexander Woollcott, who was at a lunch with Benchley, Parker, and others. Given that Benchley had two children at the time of his resignation, Parker referred to it as "the greatest act of friendship I'd ever seen".

After Benchley's resignation, he received many freelance offers. He worked constantly while claiming he was intensely lazy. He was offered $200 per basic subject article for The Home Sector, and a weekly freelance salary from New York World to write a book review column three times per week for the same salary he received at Vanity Fair. The column, titled "Books and Other Things," was published for one year and included mundane topics such as Bricklaying In Modern Practice. Unfortunately for Benchley, however, his writing a syndicated column for David Lawrence drew the ire of his World bosses, and "Books and Other Things" was terminated.

Benchley continued to freelance, submitting humor columns to a variety of publications, including Life (fellow humorist James Thurber stated that Benchley's columns were the only reason the magazine was read). He continued meeting with his friends at the Algonquin Hotel, and the group became popularly known as the Algonquin Round Table. In April 1920, Benchley obtained a job with Life writing theatre reviews, which he would continue doing regularly through 1929, eventually taking complete control of the drama section. His reviews were known for their flair, and he often used them to publicise issues of concern to him, whether petty (people who cough during plays) or more important (such as racial intolerance).

Things changed again for Benchley a number of years into the arrangement. A theatrical production by the members of the Round Table was put together in response to a challenge from actor J. M. Kerrigan, who was tired of the Table's complaints about the ongoing theatre season. The result, which played for one night April 30, 1922 at the 49th Street Theatre, was No Sirree! (the name being a pun of the European revue La Chauve-Souris), "An Anonymous Entertainment by the Vicious Circle of the Hotel Algonquin." Benchley's contribution to the program, "The Treasurer's Report," featured Benchley as a nervous, disorganized man attempting to summarize an organization's yearly expenses. The revue was applauded by both spectators and fellow actors, with Benchley's performance receiving the biggest laughs. A reprise of "The Treasurer's Report" was often requested for future events, and Irving Berlin (who had been musical director for No Sirree!) prompted producer Sam H. Harris to request Benchley to perform it as part of Berlin's Music Box Revue. Reluctant to appear onstage as a regular performer, Benchley decided to ask Harris for the outlandish sum of $500 a week for his brief act in order to get out of the situation entirely; when Harris replied "OK, Bob. But for $500 you better be good," Benchley was completely surprised. The Music Box Revue began in September 1921 and played until September 1922, with Benchley appearing in his eleven-minute skit eight times a week (evening performances on Monday through Saturday and matinees on Wednesday and Saturday).

=== The movies and The New Yorker ===
Benchley had continued to receive positive responses from his performing, and in 1925 he accepted a standing invitation from movie producer Jesse L. Lasky for a six-week term writing screenplays at $500. While the session did not yield significant results, Benchley did get writing credit for producing the title cards on the Raymond Griffith silent movie You'd Be Surprised (released September 1926), and was invited to do some titling for two other movies.

Benchley was also hired to help with the book for a George Gershwin musical, Smarty, featuring Fred Astaire—Benchley's name and Fred Thompson's were listed as the book writers on the sheet music issued during the tryout period. This experience was not as positive, as most of Benchley's contributions were excised and the final product, Funny Face, did not have Benchley's name attached.

Worn down, Benchley began his next commitment, motion-picture versions of his pieces The Treasurer's Report and The Sex Life of the Polyp, filmed in 1928 by Fox with its new Movietone sound system. The filming went quickly, and though he was convinced he didn't perform well as a screen performer, both shorts were financial and critical successes—especially when considering that talking short-subject comedies were then in their infancy, and Benchley's pioneer efforts helped to establish them. Benchley featured in a third short not written by him, The Spellbinder. As Life would say after his eventual resignation in 1929, "Mr. Benchley has left Dramatic Criticism for the Talking Movies".

During the time that Benchley was filming various short movies, he also began working at The New Yorker, which had started in February 1925 under the control of Benchley's friend Harold Ross. While Benchley, along with many of his Algonquin acquaintances, was wary of getting involved with another publication for various reasons, he completed some freelance work for The New Yorker during the first few years, and was later invited to be newspaper critic. Benchley initially wrote the column using the pseudonym Guy Fawkes (the main conspirator in the English Gunpowder Plot), and the column was well received. Benchley discussed issues ranging from careless reporting to European fascism, and the publication flourished. He was invited to be theatre critic for The New Yorker in 1929, quitting Life, and contributions from Woollcott and Parker became regular features of the magazine. The New Yorker published an average of forty-eight Benchley columns per year during the early 1930s.

With the emergence of The New Yorker, Benchley was able to stay away from Hollywood work for a number of years. In 1931, he was persuaded to do voice work for RKO Radio Pictures for a movie that would eventually be titled Sky Devils, and he acted in his first feature movie, The Sport Parade (1932) with Joel McCrea. The work on The Sport Parade caused Benchley to miss the autumn theatre openings, which embarrassed him (even if the relative success of The Sport Parade was often credited to Benchley's role), but the lure of moviemaking did not disappear, since RKO offered him a writing and acting contract for the next year for more money than he was making writing for The New Yorker.

=== Benchley on film and "How to Sleep" ===
Benchley re-entered Hollywood at the height of the Great Depression and the large-scale introduction of the talkie movies he had begun working with years before. His arrival put him on the scene of a number of productions almost instantly. While Benchley was more interested in writing than acting, one of his more important roles as an actor was as a salesman in Rafter Romance, and his work attracted the interest of Metro-Goldwyn-Mayer (MGM). Benchley took a role in the feature movie Dancing Lady (1933), which also featured Joan Crawford, Clark Gable, Fred Astaire, Nelson Eddy, and the Three Stooges. That same year, Benchley appeared in the short movies Your Technocracy and Mine for Universal Pictures and How to Break 90 at Croquet for RKO. He continued to work in Hollywood as a writer and performer, contributing dialogue for the Stuart Palmer mystery Murder on a Honeymoon (1935) and appearing in the lavish feature-length production China Seas for MGM, featuring Clark Gable, Jean Harlow, Wallace Beery, and Rosalind Russell; Benchley's character was a slurring drunk throughout the movie.

Upon its completion, MGM invited Benchley to write and perform in a short production inspired by a Mellon Institute study on sleep commissioned by the Simmons Mattress Company. The resulting movie, How to Sleep, was filmed in two days, and it featured Benchley as both the narrator and sleeper—the latter a role Benchley claimed was "not much of a strain, as [he] was in bed most of the time." Benchley was in fact a last-minute participant. As his son Nathaniel Benchley recalled, "How to Sleep was supposed to be a Pete Smith short, but Pete Smith was sick. It was going to be a thing on Simmons mattresses; they had this film of quick shots showing how many positions you take during an evening's sleep. They tried to have somebody else do it, who couldn't make it, and they finally came to my father and asked if he would try to do it. That's what finally wound up being How to Sleep." The film was well received at previews and was promoted heavily, with a still from the film being used in Simmons advertisements. The only group not pleased was the Mellon Institute, which did not approve of the studio mocking their study.

How to Sleep was named Best Short Subject at the 1935 Academy Awards, and MGM kicked off an entire series of situation-comedy reels, each 10 minutes in length, showing Benchley giving mock-instructional lectures (How to Be a Detective, How to Rest, etc.) or coping with household situations (An Evening Alone, Home Movies, etc.).

While starring in his short subjects Benchley returned to feature films, cast in the revue Broadway Melody of 1938 and in his largest role to that point, the lightweight comedy Live, Love and Learn. The latter film is actually more notable for its coming-attractions trailer, "The Glamorous Robert Benchley in How to Make a Movie Trailer," staged like one of his comedy shorts and even using the shorts' theme song.

Benchley's 1937 short A Night at the Movies, showing Mr. B.'s disastrous evening at the neighborhood moviehouse, was his greatest success since How to Sleep: it was Oscar-nominated, and secured him a contract for more short subjects. These films were produced more quickly than his previous efforts (while How to Sleep needed two days, the later short How to Vote needed less than twelve hours), and took their toll on Benchley. He still completed two shoots in one day (one of which was The Courtship of the Newt), but rested for a while following the 1937 schedule.

Benchley's return yielded two more short films, and his high-profile prompted negotiations for sponsorship of a Benchley radio program and numerous appearances on television shows, including the first television entertainment program ever broadcast, an untitled test program using an experimental antenna on the Empire State Building. The radio program, Melody and Madness—with the "Melody" provided by Artie Shaw—was a showcase for Benchley's acting, as he did not participate in writing it. It was not well received and it was removed from the schedule, although television was still in its experimental stages and few people saw the program, doing little or no damage to Benchley's reputation.

=== Later life ===
The year 1939 was a bad year for Benchley's career. Besides the cancellation of his radio show, Benchley learned that MGM did not plan to renew his shorts contract, and The New Yorker, frustrated with Benchley's film career taking precedence over his theatre column, appointed Wolcott Gibbs to take over in his stead. Following his final New Yorker column in 1940, Benchley signed with Paramount Pictures for a new series of one-reel shorts, all filmed at Paramount's Long Island studio in Astoria, New York. Most of them were adapted from his old essays. The Witness was based on his 1935 essay "Take the Witness!," with Benchley fantasizing about conquering a tough cross-examination; Crime Control was taken from his 1931 story "The Real Public Enemies," showing the criminal tendencies of sinister household objects.

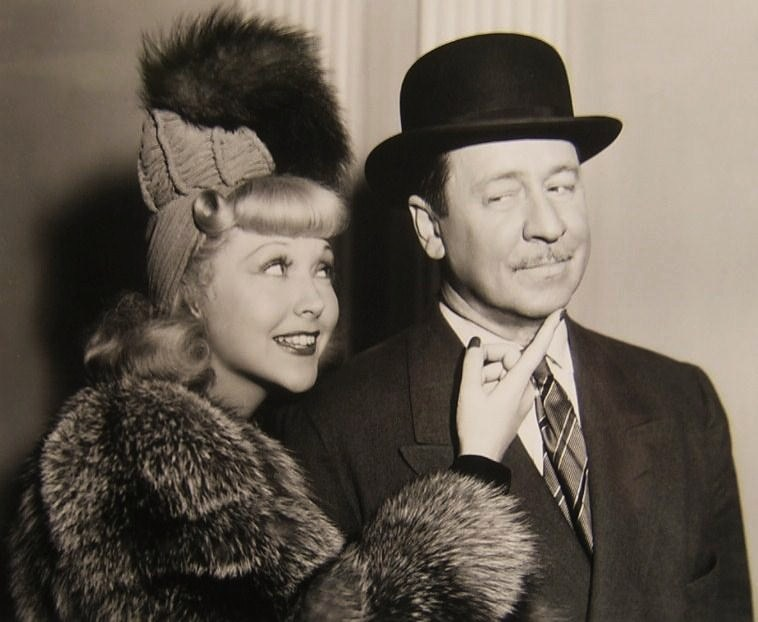
Joyce Compton and Robert Benchley in Bedtime Story (1941)

In 1940 Benchley appeared in Alfred Hitchcock's Foreign Correspondent for which he is also credited as one of the dialogue writers. In 1941 Benchley received more feature-length roles: Walt Disney's The Reluctant Dragon, in which Benchley tours the various departments of the Disney studio;, Nice Girl? with Deanna Durbin, noteworthy for a rare dramatic performance by Benchley; and three for Columbia Pictures, Bedtime Story starring Fredric March and Loretta Young, I Married a Witch starring Fredric March and Veronica Lake, and the farce comedy Three Girls About Town, starring Joan Blondell and featuring Benchley.

Benchley's roles primarily came as a freelance actor, as his Paramount shorts contract didn't pay as well as feature films. Benchley was cast in minor roles for various romantic comedies, some shoots going better than others. He appeared in prominent roles with Fred Astaire in You'll Never Get Rich (1941) and The Sky's the Limit (1943). Paramount did not renew his shorts contract when it lapsed in 1942—no fault of Benchley; the studio was suspending all short-subject production in New York.

Benchley signed with MGM with an exclusive contract to work in Hollywood. The situation was not positive for Benchley, as the studio "mishandled" him and kept Benchley too busy to complete his own work. His contract concluded with only four short films completed and no chance of signing another contract. Following the printing of two books of his old New Yorker columns, Benchley gave up writing for good in 1943, signing one more contract with Paramount for feature films in December of that year.

While Benchley's books and Paramount contract were giving him financial security, he was still unhappy with the turn his career had taken. By 1944 he was taking thankless roles in the studio's least distinguished films, like the rustic musical National Barn Dance. He also appeared as a guest November 10, 1944 on radio's 'Duffy's Tavern'.

By this time Robert Benchley's screen image was established as a comic lecturer who tried but failed to clarify any given topic. In this capacity Paramount cast him in the 1945 Bob Hope-Bing Crosby comedy Road to Utopia; Benchley interrupts the action periodically to "explain" the nonsensical storyline. On April 22, 1945, he guest starred on the Blue Network's (soon to be ABC) top-rated radio series The Andrews Sisters Show, sponsored by Nash motor cars & Kelvinator home appliances. His final radio appearances was as a guest on Hildegarde's Raleigh Room (NBC) on October 30, 1945.

=== Death ===
Though Benchley had been a teetotaler in his youth, in later life he drank with increasing frequency, and eventually he was diagnosed with cirrhosis of the liver. While he completed his year's work, his condition continued to deteriorate, and he died in a New York hospital on November 21, 1945. His funeral was private, and his body was cremated and interred in a family plot in Prospect Hill Cemetery on the island of Nantucket.

The 1954 publication of The Benchley Roundup, a collection of favorite Robert Benchley essays edited by Nathaniel Benchley, prompted MGM to re-release Benchley's movie shorts to theaters in 1955.

In 1960, Benchley was posthumously inducted into the Hollywood Walk of Fame with a motion pictures star at 1724 Vine Street.

A street in Co-op City, Bronx, New York is named for Benchley (Benchley Place).

=== Family ===
Nathaniel Benchley also became an author, and he published a biography of his father in 1955. He was also a well-respected fiction and children's book author. Nathaniel married and also had sons who became writers: Peter Benchley was known best for the book Jaws (which was adapted as the movie of the same name), and Nat Benchley wrote and performed in an acclaimed one-man production based on their grandfather Robert's life.

== Algonquin Round Table ==
The Algonquin Round Table was a group of New York City writers and actors who met regularly between 1919 and 1929 at the Algonquin Hotel. Initially consisting of Benchley, Dorothy Parker, and Alexander Woollcott during their time at Vanity Fair, the group eventually expanded to over a dozen regular members of the New York media and entertainment, such as playwrights George S. Kaufman and Marc Connelly and journalist/critic Heywood Broun, who gained prominence due to his positions during the Sacco and Vanzetti trial. The table gained prominence due to the media attention the members drew as well as their collective contributions to their respective areas.

Mrs. Parker and the Vicious Circle is a 1994 American film that depicts the Round Table from the perspective of Dorothy Parker. Campbell Scott portrays Robert Benchley.

== Humor style ==
Benchley's humor was molded during his time at Harvard. While his skills as an orator were already known by classmates and friends, it was not until his work at the Lampoon that his style formed. The prominent styles of humor were then "crackerbarrel"—which relied on devices such as dialects and a disdain for formal education, in the style of humorists like Artemus Ward and David Ross Locke, through his alter-ego Petroleum Vesuvius Nasby—and a more "genteel" style of humor, very literary and upper-class in nature, a style popularized by Oliver Wendell Holmes. While the two styles were, at first glance, diametrically opposed, they coexisted in magazines such as Vanity Fair and Life. The Lampoon primarily used the latter style, which suited Benchley. While some of his pieces would not have been out of place in a crackerbarrel-style presentation, Benchley's reliance on puns and wordplay resonated more with the literary humorists, as shown by his success with The New Yorker, known for the highbrow tastes of its readers.

Benchley's definition of humor was simple: "Anything that makes people laugh."

Benchley's characters were typically exaggerated representations of the common man. They were designed to create a contrast between himself and the masses; the character is often befuddled by society and is often neurotic in a "different" way—the character in How to Watch Football, for instance, finds it sensible for a normal fan to forgo the live experience and read the recap in the local papers. This character, labeled the "Little Man" and in some ways similar to many of Mark Twain's protagonists, was based on Benchley himself; the character did not persist in Benchley's writing past the early 1930s, but survived in his speaking and acting roles. This character was apparent in Benchley's Ivy Oration during his Harvard graduation ceremonies, and would appear throughout his career, such as during "The Treasurer's Report" in the 1920s and his work in feature films in the 1930s.

Topical, current-event style pieces written for Vanity Fair during the war did not lose their levity, either. He was not afraid to poke fun at the establishment (one piece he wrote was titled "Have You a Little German Agent in Your Home?"), and his common man observations often veered into angry rants, such as his piece "The Average Voter," where the namesake of the piece "[F]orgets what the paper said...so votes straight Republicrat ticket." His lighter fare did not hesitate to touch upon topical issues, drawing analogies between a football game and patriotism, or chewing gum and diplomacy and economic relations with Mexico.

In his films, the common man exaggerations continued. Much of his time in the films was spent spoofing himself, whether it was the affected nervousness of the treasurer in The Treasurer's Report or the discomfort in explaining The Sex Life of the Polyp to a women's club. The longer, plot-driven shorts, such as Lesson Number One, Furnace Trouble, and Stewed, Fried and Boiled, likewise show a Benchley character overmatched by seemingly mundane tasks. Even the more stereotypical characters held these qualities, such as the incapable sportscaster Benchley played in The Sport Parade. Critic Leslie Halliwell praised him "For assuming a subtly fantasticated screen version of his own cosmopolitan personality, and delighting the world by doing so."

Benchley's humor inspired a number of later humorists and filmmakers. Dave Barry, author, onetime humor writer for the Miami Herald, and judge of the 2006 and 2007 Robert Benchley Society Award for Humor, has called Benchley his "idol" and he "always wanted to write like [Benchley]." Horace Digby claimed that, "[M]ore than anyone else, Robert Benchley influenced [his] early writing style." Outsider filmmaker Sidney N. Laverents lists Benchley as an influence as well, and James Thurber used Benchley as a reference point, citing Benchley's penchant for presenting "the commonplace as remarkable" in "The Secret Life of Walter Mitty". In 1944, Benchley starred as Mitty in an adaptation of the story for the radio anthology series, This Is My Best.

== Works ==
Benchley produced over 600 essays, which were initially compiled in twelve volumes, during his writing career. He also appeared in a number of films, including 48 short treatments that he mostly wrote or co-wrote and numerous feature films.

Posthumously, Benchley's works continue to be released in books such as the 1983 Random House compilation The Best of Robert Benchley, and the 2005 collection of short films Robert Benchley and the Knights of the Algonquin, which compiled many of Benchley's popular short films from his years at Paramount with other works from fellow humorists and writers Alexander Woollcott and Donald Ogden Stewart.
