= Scarecrow (disambiguation) =

A scarecrow is a decoy used to discourage birds from disturbing crops.

Scarecrow(s) or The Scarecrow(s) may also refer to:

== Comics ==
- Scarecrow (DC Comics), a supervillain in the Batman series
- Scarecrow (Marvel Comics), a supervillain
- Straw Man (comics), originally Scarecrow, a Marvel Comics character

== Film and television ==
=== Films ===
- The Scarecrow (1920 film), an American silent short film starring Buster Keaton
- The Scarecrow (Hollywood Television Theatre), a 1972 American television film presentation of the play by Percy MacKaye (see below)
- Scarecrow (1973 film), an American film starring Gene Hackman and Al Pacino
- The Scarecrow (1982 film), a New Zealand film
- Scarecrow (1984 film), a Russian drama film by Rolan Bykov
- The Scarecrow (1985 film), an Iranian film
- Scarecrows (1988 film), an American horror film
- The Scarecrow (2000 film), an American animated fantasy film
- Kakashi (translated as Scarecrow), a 2001 Japanese horror film
- Scarecrow (2002 film), an American direct-to-video horror film
- The Scarecrow (2013 film), an American animated short film and advertisement
- Scarecrow (2013 film), an American television horror film
- Scarecrows (2017 film), a Canadian horror film
- Scarecrow (2020 film), a Russian drama film

=== Television ===
- Scarecrow and Mrs. King, a 1980s American TV series
- The Scarecrow (TV series), a 2026 South Korean TV series
- "Scarecrow" (The Adventures of the Galaxy Rangers), an episode
- "Scarecrow" (Supernatural), an episode
- "Scarecrow" (This Country), a 2017 episode
- "The Scarecrow" (Gotham episode), the fifteenth episode of the television series Gotham
- Scarecrow (Doctor Who), a fictional race

== Literature ==
- Scarecrow (Oz), one of the main protagonists in L. Frank Baum's The Wonderful Wizard of Oz
- The Scarecrow (play), a 1908 play by Percy MacKaye
- Doctor Syn, a smuggler who operated under the costumed alias, “The Scarecrow”, in the 1915 novel, Doctor Syn, a Tale of the Romney Marsh, by Russell Thorndike
- Scarecrow & Other Anomalies, a poetry collection by Oliverio Girondo
- The Scarecrows, a 1981 young-adult novel by Robert Westall
- Scarecrow Press, an imprint of Rowman & Littlefield founded in 1995
- "The Scarecrow" (short story), a short story by R. L. Stine
- Scarecrow (novel), a 2003 novel by Matthew Reilly
  - Shane Schofield, or Scarecrow, the protagonist of Scarecrow and other novels by Reilly
- The Scarecrow (Connelly novel), a 2009 crime novel by Michael Connelly
- The Scarecrow, a 2009 novel by Sean Williams

== Music ==
- The Scarecrow (opera), a 2006 opera by Joseph Turrin, based on the MacKaye play

=== Performers ===
- Scarecrow (band), an American heavy metal band
- Lord Infamous (1973–2013), also known as The Scarecrow, American rapper
- X Marks the Pedwalk, originally Scarecrow, a German band

=== Albums ===
- Scarecrow (Decyfer Down album) or the title song, 2013
- Scarecrow (Garth Brooks album), 2001
- Scarecrow (John Craigie album), 2018
- Scarecrow (John Mellencamp album), 1985
- The Scarecrow (album) or the title song, by Avantasia, 2008
- Scarecrow, by Cats in Space, 2017
- Scarecrow or the title song, by Citizen Soldier (band), 2022

=== Songs ===
- "Scarecrow" (song), by Melissa Etheridge, 1999
- "The Scarecrow" (song), by Pink Floyd, 1967
- "Scare Crow", by Ministry from Psalm 69: The Way to Succeed and the Way to Suck Eggs, 1992
- "S/C/A/R/E/C/R/O/W" by My Chemical Romance from Danger Days: The True Lives of the Fabulous Killjoys, 2010
- "Scarecrow", by Beck from Guero, 2005
- "Scarecrow", by Counting Crows from Somewhere Under Wonderland, 2014
- "Scarecrow", by the Pillows from Wake Up! Wake Up! Wake Up!, 2007
- "Scarecrow", by Wand from Laughing Matter, 2019
- "Scarecrows", by Luke Bryan from Kill the Lights, 2015
- "Scarecrow", by +/- from You Are Here, 2003

== Other ==
- Scarecrow (wine), a California wine producer
- Scarecrow Video, a video sales and rental store in Seattle, Washington, US
- Scarecrow, a fictional monster in Dungeons & Dragons
