= Name, Age and Occupation =

- Directed by: Pare Lorentz
- Screenplay by: Pare Lorentz
- Based on: radio play Ecce Homo by Pare Lorentz
- Produced by: Pare Lorentz
- Starring: Robert Ryan; Frances Dee
- Cinematography: Floyd Crosby
- Production company: RKO Pictures
- Country: United States
- Language: English
- Budget: $300,000 (est.)

Name, Age and Occupation is an unfinished 1942 American feature film from Pare Lorentz, and would have been, if completed, his first "entertainment feature". Lorentz started filming in 1939 under contract to RKO Pictures, but RKO stopped production in 1942 for various reasons. The film was itself based on two other unfinished projects of Lorentz—a novel and a documentary. Although the story was fictional, the film "was to document popular participation in the war effort".

The movie helped launch the film career of Robert Ryan, who was cast in the lead role. Although the film was never made, it led to Ryan staying in Hollywood and becoming a film star at RKO.

== Background ==
=== Ecce Homo ===
By the late 1930s Lorentz was one the most famous documentary filmmakers in the world, having made films such as The River and The Plow That Broke the Plains.

In 1938 he produced a radio play about four unemployed workers, Ecce Homo, which was the basis for the film. (Ecce Homo—which meant "behold the man"—was one of the film's working titles.) The radio play was first broadcast on CBS in May 1938.

=== Film ===
By the end of 1938 Lorentz announced he would be making a film based on the radio play, sponsored by the Departments of the Interior, Agriculture and Works. It would focus on unemployment. Filming began in 1939, and by May 1940 newspaper reports claimed it was two-thirds completed but that work had been halted so more research could be done. Another reason given was that Congress decided to abolish the United States Film Service.

In 1941, George J. Schaefer, then head of RKO Pictures, offered Lorentz a two-film contract at the studio. The first film would be Ecce Homo, now retitled Name, Age and Occupation.

The film was to star Robert Ryan and Frances Dee. As it would have been Lorentz's first dramatic film, Ryan felt insecure about the project. John Houseman worked on the film until he entered the armed services.

Filming took place throughout the US with limited studio work at RKO. According to director Edward Dmytryk, after 90 days of filming, Lorentz proved unable to respect the schedule and production was cancelled by RKO.

According to a later legal case involving the film, by 16 May 1942 Lorentz had been working on the film for forty weeks at a salary of $1,250 a week. On that date RKO stopped paying him. About eight weeks later he was fired, with the film an estimated twelve weeks short of completion. RKO claims $400,000 had been spent on the film and that $400,000 more would be required to complete it.

The footage ("several tens of thousand feet of industrial footage") was repurposed for propaganda films.

The film was cancelled at RKO around the same time the studio cancelled It's All True from Orson Welles. George J. Schaefer, who had supported this new ambitious project encouraged by the success of Citizen Kane, had already resigned when the decision was known in July 1942.

The film remained "Lorentz's first and last Hollywood production". He later sued RKO for breach of contract and defamation.

As for Ryan, The Reading Eagle commented "When plans for that picture were shelved, studio bosses forgot Ryan and he twiddled his thumbs for ten months before being assigned bits in Bombardier and The Sky's the Limit.

== Premise ==
The film would have told the "25-year odyssey" of a typical American between 1917 and 1942: from his experience as a North-Carolina teenager fighting overseas during World War I, until World War II, focusing on the migration of the family from the South and the problems of unemployment during the Great Depression.

== Cast ==
- Robert Ryan, presented as "a stage actor discovered by Lorentz in the East" at the early stage of pre-production
- Frances Dee
- Dudley Digges
- Erford Gage
