= Rat race =

Metaphor for career pursuits and attainment

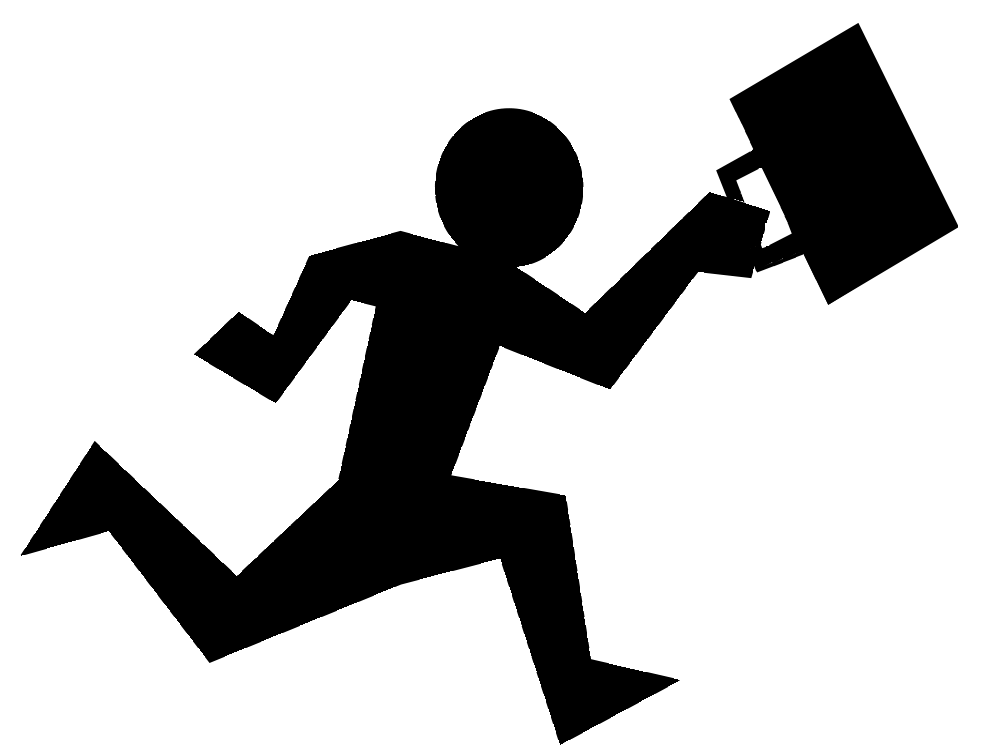
The term may be applied to an exhausting working lifestyle

A rat race is a metaphor used to describe an endless, self-defeating, or pointless pursuit.

The phrase is sometimes used to relate the human life to that of rats attempting to earn an ultimately pointless reward when death is inevitable. While rats pursue cheese, humans pursue financial and competitive gain. While both often compete and struggle for existence, both humans and rats eventually reach the same fate: death. This ultimately represents a nihilistic philosophical approach to life and society. The term is also commonly associated with an exhausting, repetitive lifestyle that leaves no time for relaxation or enjoyment.

== Etymology ==
In the late 1800s, the term "rat-run" was used meaning "maze-like passages by which rats move about their territory", commonly used in a derogatory sense.

By the 1930s, actual rat races of some sort are frequently mentioned among carnival and gambling attractions.

By 1934, "rat-race" was also used in reference to aviation training, referring to a "follow-the-leader" game in which a trainee fighter pilot had to copy all the actions (loops, rolls, spins, Immelmann turns etc.) performed by an experienced pilot.

From 1939, the phrase took on the meaning of "competitive struggle" referring to a person's work and life.

== Historical usage ==
The Rat Race was used as a title for a novel written by Jay Franklin in 1947 for Colliers Magazine and first published in book form in 1950. It is dedicated To those few rats in Washington who do not carry brief-cases.

The term "rat race" was used in an article about Samuel Goudsmit published in 1953 entitled: A Farewell to String and Sealing Wax~I in which Daniel Lang wrote:

Sometimes when his sardonic mood is on him, he wonders whether the synchrotrons, the betatrons, the cosmotrons, and all the other contrivances physicists have lately rigged up to create energy by accelerating particles of matter aren't playing a wry joke on their inventors. "They are accelerating us too," he says, in a voice that still betrays a trace of the accent of his native Holland. In protesting against the speedup, Goudsmit can speak with authority, for in the course of only a few years, he, like many other contemporary physicists, has seen his way of life change from a tranquil one of contemplation to a rat race.

Philip K. Dick used the term in "The Last of the Masters" published in 1954:

"Maybe," McLean said softly, "you and I can then get off this rat race. You and I and all the rest of us. And live like human beings." "Rat race," Fowler murmured. "Rats in a maze. Doing tricks. Performing chores thought up by somebody else." McClean caught Fowler's eye. "By somebody of another species."

Jim Bishop used the term rat race in his book The Golden Ham: A Candid Biography of Jackie Gleason. The term occurs in a letter Jackie Gleason wrote to his wife in which he says: "Television is a rat race, and remember this, even if you win you are still a rat."

William H. Whyte used the term rat race in The Organization Man published in 1956:

The word collective most of them can't bring themselves to use—except to describe foreign countries or organizations they don't work for—but they are keenly aware of how much more deeply beholden they are to organization than were their elders. They are wry about it, to be sure; they talk of the "treadmill," the "rat race," of the inability to control one's direction.

Merle A. Tuve used the term rat race in a 1959 article entitled "Is Science Too Big for the Scientist?", writing:

There is a growing conviction among many of my friends in academic circles that the university today is no place for a scholar in science. A professor's life nowadays is a rat-race of busyness and activity, managing contracts and projects, guiding teams of assistants, bossing crews of technicians, making numerous trips, sitting on committees for government agencies, and engaging in other distractions necessary to keep the whole frenetic business from collapse.

David Foster Wallace used the term rat race in his 2005 commencement speech entitled "The Most Precious Freedom":

The really important kind of freedom involves attention and awareness and discipline, and being able truly to care about other people and to sacrifice for them over and over in myriad petty, (unglamorous) ways every day. That is real freedom. That is being educated, and understanding how to think. The alternative is unconsciousness, the default setting, the rat race, the constant gnawing sense of having had, and lost, some infinite thing.

== Music ==
- Elton John's I Think I'm Going to Kill Myself ("This race is a waste of time")
- "Rat Race" by British rock band Enter Shikari (2013)
- Have a Blast Periphery II by Periphery (2012)
- "Slave to the Wage" by English alternative rock band Placebo (2000)
- "Escape (Free Yo Mind From This Rat Race)" by American singer Prince
- "Rat Race" by English ska band The Specials (1980)
- "Mice Race" by British anarcho-punk band Rudimentary Peni (1982)
- "Rat Race" by Billy Idol (2005)
- "Rat Race" by Bob Marley (1976)
- "Rat Race" by Babbu Maan (2020)
- "The Clockwise Witness" by DeVotchKa describes the futility of the rat race (2008)
- "Even if You Win, You're Still a Rat" by British metalcore band Architects (2012)
- RatRace by English metal band Skindred (2007)
- "The Racing Rats" by English rock band Editors (2007)
- Mentioned in the song "Mr. Briefcase" by American jazz guitarist Lee Ritenour (1981)
- Mentioned in the song "Country House" by English rock band Blur (1995)

== See also ==
- Abilene paradox
- Crab bucket
- Downshifting (lifestyle)
- Neijuan
- Sisyphus, a Greek mythological figure
- The Myth of Sisyphus, an essay by Albert Camus
- Work–life balance
