= Fight for Life =

Fight for Life may refer to:

- The Fight for Life, a 1940 American movie directed by Pare Lorentz.
- Fight for Life (film), a 1987 American TV movie.
- Fight for Life (TV series), a 2007 UK health series.
- Fight for Life (video game), a 1996 game for the Atari Jaguar.
- Fight for Life (New Zealand charity), a charity whose boxing events are promoted by Dean Lonergan.
- Fight for Life (UK charity), a children's cancer charity whose onetime patron was Gary Lineker.
