= Ralph Steiner =

American photographer (1899–1986)

- Ralph Steiner (left) and Pare Lorentz
- Born: Ralph Steiner; February 8, 1899; Cleveland, Ohio, US
- Died: July 13, 1986 (aged 87)
- Occupation: Photographer

Ralph Steiner (February 8, 1899 – July 13, 1986) was an American photographer, pioneering documentarian, and leading figure among avant-garde filmmakers in the 1930s.

== Early life and education ==
Ralph Steiner was born to a Jewish family in Cleveland, Ohio, on February 8, 1899.

In 1917, Steiner gained admission to Dartmouth College in New Hampshire, at a time when Ivy League schools limited the number of Jewish students who were allowed to attend. He would later tell an interviewer, "to be at Dartmouth, Jewish, neurotic, and shy was like being a Martian with a green head and four eyes." Steiner, who was a chemistry major, had the good fortune to find a biology professor, Leland Griggs, who was also a nature photographer. Griggs offered to teach a photography course, and Steiner was the only student in the class.

== Photographer ==
After graduating from Dartmouth in 1921, Steiner went to the Clarence H. White School of Modern Photography in New York City. White helped Steiner to find a job at the Manhattan Photogravure Company, where he worked on making photogravure plates of scenes from Robert Flaherty's 1922 film Nanook of the North.

Not long after that, Steiner's career as a freelance photographer in New York began, working mostly in advertising and for publications like Ladies' Home Journal. Steiner and fellow graduate Anton Bruehl opened a studio on 47th Street in 1925. They produced a narrative series of amusing table-top shots of three cut‑out figures dressed in suits for The New Yorker magazine, and advertisements for Weber and Heilbroner menswear in a running weekly series. Their client was wiped out in the Wall Street Crash.

Through the encouragement of fellow photographer Paul Strand, Steiner joined the left-of-center Film and Photo League around 1927. He was also to influence the photography of Walker Evans, giving him guidance, technical assistance, and one of his view cameras.

== Filmmaker ==
H2O (1929)

In 1929, Steiner made his first film, H2O, a poetic evocation of water that captured the abstract patterns generated by waves. Although it was not the only film of its kind at the time – Joris Ivens made Regen (Rain) that same year, and Henwar Rodakiewicz worked on his similar film Portrait of a Young Man (1931) through this whole period – it made a significant impression in its day and since has become recognized as a classic: H2O was added to the National Film Registry in December 2005. Among Steiner's other early films, Surf and Seaweed (1931) expands on the concept of H2O as Steiner turns his camera to the shoreline; Mechanical Principles (1930) was an abstraction based on gears and machinery.

In 1930, Steiner joined the faculty of the so-called Harry Alan Potamkin Film School, which folded shortly before Potamkin's death in 1933; there he met Leo Hurwitz and, inspired by Hurwitz' ideas of utilizing film as a means of social action, left the Film and Photo League and joined Nykino, a loose coalition of New York-based cinematographers who pooled footage for use in left-wing newsreels shown at workers' rallies and conventions, and during strikes. Precious few of these films have survived, most having been destroyed in a warehouse fire in 1935. During this period, Steiner also worked on some topical, fictional "pool" film satires, including Pie in the Sky (1935), the earliest film to involve the talents of Elia Kazan.

Steiner spent summers at the Pine Brook Country Club located in the countryside of Nichols, Connecticut, which became the summer rehearsal headquarters of the Group Theatre (New York) working with Felicia Sorel and Gluck Sandor among others.

Steiner worked, alongside Strand, Hurwitz and Paul Ivano as a cinematographer on Pare Lorentz' The Plow That Broke the Plains (1936) and likewise joined Lorentz on The River (1938) but did not receive credit. Although Steiner remained with Nykino throughout their transition into Frontier Films, he left in 1938, taking the footage of The City (1939) with him. The City, which Steiner co-directed with Willard Van Dyke and featuring original music by Aaron Copland, opened at the New York World's Fair in 1939 and ran for two years. Henwar Rodakiewicz moved from Los Angeles in August 1938 to assist Steiner in the production of The City, contributing his editing, writing, and organizational skills to the project.

Despite his own stated disdain of Hollywood and the shared sentiments of his colleagues, in the 1940s Steiner went to Hollywood to work as a writer-producer, but returned to New York after only four years spent there. Then he plunged back into the world of freelance and fashion photography, working for Vogue, Look Magazine and others before retiring in 1962. Steiner then settled in Thetford, Vermont and he spent summers on a Maine island.

== Late films ==
After a lengthy break from filmmaking, Steiner resumed the activity on a private basis, creating eight films between 1960 and 1975 grouped under an umbrella title, "The Joy of Seeing." According to Scott MacDonald, these films are marred by inappropriate soundtracks and compromised by Steiner's own desire to avoid artistic pretension at all costs, yet "contain much of Steiner's most beautiful and memorable imagery." Nathaniel Dorsky, who helped edit Steiner's later films, stated that Steiner "didn't want to make anything fancy but was an old man who appreciated life itself and wanted his film to simply show the special magic there was in our visual world in the most ordinary circumstances."

== Legacy ==
Gypsy Rose Lee and Her Girls

Steiner's still photographs are notable for their odd angles, abstraction and sometimes bizarre subject matter; the 1944 image Gypsy Rose Lee and Her Girls is sometimes mistaken for Weegee.

Steiner's experimental films, however, are considered central to the literature of early American avant-garde cinema, and the influence of his visual style continues to assert itself. For example, contemporary avant-garde filmmaker Timoleon Wilkins cites Steiner as an inspiration. In his appreciation of Steiner, author Scott McDonald expands that list to include Dorsky, Andrew Noren, Larry Gottheim and Peter Hutton. The links between the first generation of American avant-garde filmmakers such as Steiner with the second – exemplified by Maya Deren, Stan Brakhage and others – are few, but Steiner is among those who managed to bridge the gap.

== Filmography ==
- H2O (1929; cinematographer/director)
- Mechanical Principles (1930; cinematographer/director)
- Surf and Seaweed (1931; cinematographer/director)
- Panther Woman of the Needle Trades, or The Lovely Life of Little Lisa (1931; cinematographer/director)
- May Day in New York (1931; cinematographer/co-director)
- Dance Film (1931; cinematographer/director)
- Harbor Scenes (1932; cinematographer/director)
- Granite, a.k.a. The Quarry (1932; cinematographer/director)
- G-3 (1933; cinematographer/director)
- Café Universal (1934; cinematographer/director)
- Hands (1934; cinematographer/co-director)
- Pie in the Sky (1935; cinematographer/co-director)
- The People's March of Time (1935; cinematographer/co-director)
- The World Today: Black Legion (1936; cinematographer/co-director)
- The World Today: Sunnyside (1936; cinematographer/co-director)
- The Plow That Broke the Plains (1936; cinematographer)
- People of the Cumberland (1938; cinematographer)
- The River (1938; cinematographer)
- The City (1939; cinematographer/co-director)
- New Hampshire Heritage (1940; cinematographer/director)
- Youth Gets a Break (1941; cinematographer)
- Troop Train (1942; cinematographer/director)
- The Joy of Seeing (1960-1975; cinematographer/director), includes:
- Seaweed, a Seduction (1960)
- One Man's Island (1969)
- Glory, Glory (1971)
- A Look at Laundry (1971)
- Beyond Niagara (1973)
- Look Park (1974)
- Hooray for Light! (1975)
- Showdown (1975)

== See also ==
- Cloudscape photography
