= List of Academy Award winners and nominees from Belarus =

This is a list of Academy Award winners and nominees from Belarus.

== Best Actor in a Leading Role ==
Best Actor
Year	Name	Film	Status	Milestone / Notes
1949	Kirk Douglas	Champion	Nominated	
1952	Kirk Douglas	The Bad and the Beautiful	Nominated	
1956	Kirk Douglas	Lust for Life	Nominated	

== Best Adapted Screenplay ==
Best Adapted Screenplay
Year	Name	Film	Status	Milestone / Notes
1934	Ben Hecht	Viva Villa!	Nominated	
1939	Ben Hecht	Wuthering Heights	Nominated	

== Best Original Screenplay ==
Best Original Screenplay
Year	Name	Film	Status	Milestone / Notes
1940	Ben Hecht	Angels Over Broadway	Nominated	
1946	Ben Hecht	Notorious	Nominated	

== Best Story ==
Best Story
Year	Name	Film	Status	Milestone / Notes
1928	Ben Hecht	Underworld	Won	
1935	Ben Hecht	The Scoundrel	Won	

== Best Original Score ==
Best Original Music Score
Year	Name	Film	Status	Milestone / Notes
1940	Louis Gruenberg	The Fight for Life	Nominated	
1941	Louis Gruenberg	So Ends Our Night	Nominated	
1943	Louis Gruenberg	Commandos Strike at Dawn	Nominated	

== Nominations and Winners ==
No. of wins	No. of nominations
2	9
