= Symphony on a Hymn Tune =

Symphony by Virgil Thomson

Symphony on a Hymn Tune is a four-movement orchestral composition by the American composer Virgil Thomson. The work was Thomson's first symphony and was composed between 1926 and 1928 while Thomson studied with the composer Nadia Boulanger in Paris. However, the work was not premiered until February 22, 1945, with Thomson leading the Philharmonic Symphony Society in New York City.

== Style and composition ==
Lasting roughly twenty minutes in performance, Symphony on a Hymn Tune is composed in four movements:

1. Introduction & Allegro
2. Andante cantabile
3. Allegretto
4. Alla breve

The first three movements were composed between 1926 and spring 1927, though Thomson, daunted by the finale, did not begin work on the fourth movement until July 1928. The piece was completed in late 1928 and was lightly revised by Thomson before its premiere in 1945. The Protestant hymns "Jesus Loves Me" and "How Firm a Foundation" serve as a thematic basis for the symphony, but the work is also influenced by other historic sacred music styles. Additionally, the piece occasionally references the popular tune used in the song "For He's a Jolly Good Fellow".

=== Instrumentation ===
The work is scored for two flutes (one doubling on piccolo), two oboes, two clarinets, two bassoons, contrabassoon, four French horns, two trumpets, three trombones, tuba, timpani, snare drums, rattle, tambourine, triangle, cymbals, tamtam, bass drum, and strings (violins I & II, violas, violoncellos, and double basses).

== Reception ==
The music critic John von Rhein of the Chicago Tribune called the work "a kind of homespun-sophisticated musical analogue to a Currier and Ives print." Writing in The Weekly Standard, Algis Valiunas opined that the work "stands worthily beside the far more famous orchestral music of Aaron Copland." Richard Buell of The Boston Globe further praised that the work's "peculiar procedures somehow suggest that Thomson has given both a kit for a symphony and the improbable assembled thing itself. There's nothing extraneous, it's strong as hell and the parts fit, but you could swear that some of them have deliberately been put in upside down." Carol J. Oja of NPR especially praised the fourth movement, "Alla breve", saying, "The fourth movement reveals how Thomson transforms melodic material. Sometimes he does so transparently, sometimes with intentional 'wrong' notes. In an era when his modernist colleagues often revered complexity, Thomson took a radical turn to simpler writing, and his cinematically sweeping melodies evoke vast expanses of the American prairie."

== Legacy ==
Significant passages from Symphony on a Hymn Tune were reused by Thomson in his score to the 1938 documentary The River by Pare Lorentz. Movements from The River were later used to score the 1983 television film The Day After by the director Nicholas Meyer. Symphony on a Hymn Tune was also arranged for piano duet by American pianist John Kirkpatrick.

== Partial discography ==
- 1965: Virgil Thomson, Symphony on a Hymn Tune, The Feast of Love; Howard Hanson, Four Psalms, Eastman-Rochester Orchestra, Howard Hanson (dir.) – Mercury Records LP: SR 90429 (1965); Thomson reissued on CD 434 310-2 (1992).
- 1989: Virgil Thomson: Orchestral Works, performed by the Monadnock Festival Orchestra, James Bolle (dir.) – Albany Records.
- 2000: Virgil Thomson: Symphony on a Hymn Tune; Symphonies Nos. 2 & 3; Pilgrims and Pioneers, performed by the New Zealand Symphony Orchestra, James Sedares (dir.) – Naxos Records.

== Bibliography ==
- Tommasini, Anthony (1997). Virgil Thomson: Composer on the Aisle. W. W. Norton & Company. ISBN 0-393-04006-2.
