= Thomas Hardie Chalmers =

American opera singer

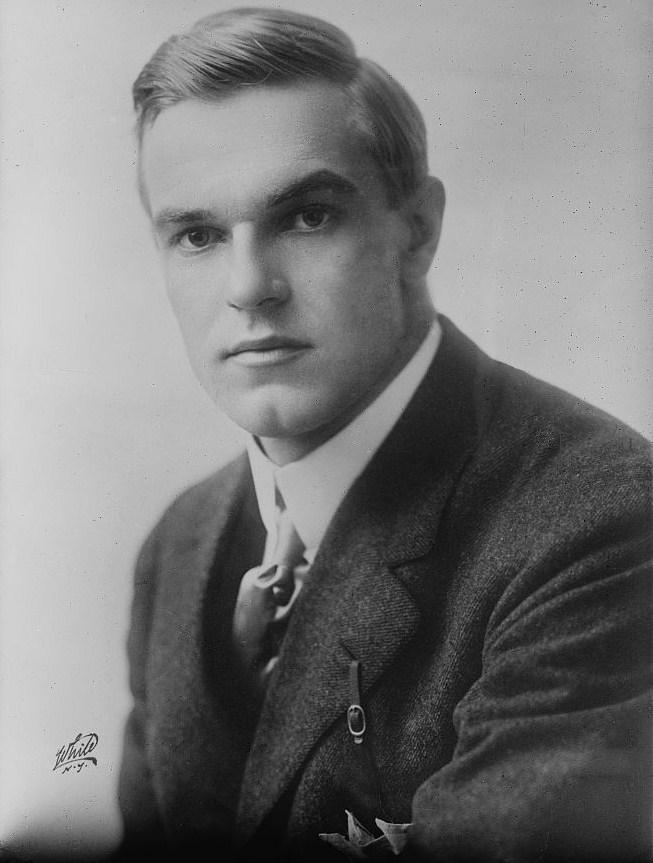
- Chalmers in the 1910s
- Born: October 20, 1884; New York City, U.S.
- Died: June 11, 1966 (aged 81); Greenwich, Connecticut, U.S.
- Other name: Thomas Chalmers
- Occupations: Opera singer; actor
- Spouse: Vilma Fiorelli
- Children: 2

Thomas Hardie Chalmers (October 20, 1884 – June 11, 1966) was an American opera singer and actor.

== Biography ==
"Vivra! Contende Il Giubilo" from Verdi's Il trovatore. Sung by Thomas Chalmers and Agnes Kimball. Edison Records, 1912.

Chalmers was born on October 20, 1884, in New York City, the son of Thomas Hardie and Sophia Amanda (De Bann) Chalmers. In 1909, he went to Florence to study singing with Vincenzo Lombardi and made his operatic debut in May 1911 in Fossombrone as Marcello in La bohème. His first appearance in the United States was as Jack Rance in The Girl of the Golden West with Henry Wilson Savage's English Grand Opera Company. Chalmers toured the United States with the company from 1911 to 12. He then sang as the leading baritone with the Boston National Opera Company and the Century Opera Company before making his Metropolitan Opera debut on November 17, 1917, as Valentin in Faust. He went on to appear regularly at the Met until 1922 and sang in the world premiere of Shanewis, the US premiere of Mârouf, and the first Met performances of La forza del destino and Crispino e la Comare. His recordings were all made for Edison and covered a wide range of repertoire from folk songs to opera; he recorded both on cylinder and the Edison Disc Record formats.

(Note: A Zonophone 78 has been found by Chalmers. Because 5522-A and Believe Me If All Those Endearing Young Charms 5522-B)

Following a throat operation, Chalmers withdrew from opera and became a stage and film actor. His many stage roles included several Broadway premieres such as Landolfo in Pirandello's The Living Mask (Henry IV), 1924; Doctor Schindler in Schnitzler's The Call of Life (Der Ruf des Lebens), 1925; Captain Adam Brant in O'Neill's Mourning Becomes Electra, 1931; Ben Loman in Miller's Death of a Salesman, 1949; and Richard Bravo in Maxwell Anderson's The Bad Seed, 1954.

One of Chalmers's earliest film roles was The Minister in the 1923 silent film Puritan Passions, based on Percy MacKaye's play The Scarecrow, which was in turn based on Feathertop, by Nathaniel Hawthorne. His last film role was The Judge in Martin Ritt's The Outrage, released in 1964. Chalmers also produced and directed several short comedy films written by Robert Benchley, including The Sex Life of the Polyp and The Treasurer's Report, both released in 1928. His voice can be heard as the narrator in two documentary films by Pare Lorentz, The Plow That Broke the Plains (1936) and The River (1938), both with scores by Virgil Thomson.

In the 1950s and '60s, Chalmers appeared on television as an actor in several drama anthology series including Westinghouse Studio One, CBS Television Workshop, Kraft Television Theatre, The DuPont Show of the Month, and Play of the Week. He also appeared in single episodes of The Further Adventures of Ellery Queen, The Defenders, Mister Peepers, and several other weekly series.

Chalmers' wife, Vilma Fiorelli, was originally from Florence. They were married in London on June 24, 1913. One of the couple's daughters, Vilma Fiora Chalmers, married the banker Alfred Hayes in 1937. Thomas Hardie Chalmers died on June 11, 1966, at the Laurelton Nursing Home in Greenwich, Connecticut. He was survived by his wife and his daughter, Vilma Hayes, wife of Alfred Hayes.

== Filmography ==
Year	Title	Role	Notes
1923	Puritan Passions	The Minister	
1927	Blind Alleys	Dr. Webster	
1936	The Plow That Broke the Plains	Narrator	
1952	Anything Can Happen	Judge	Uncredited
1953	Roots of Happiness	Narrator	From the Puerto Rico Department of Public Health and the Mental Health Film Board
1957	The Love Specialist		
1961	Romanoff and Juliet	Chief Executive	
1963	All the Way Home	Joel	
1964	The Outrage	Judge	(final film role)

== Sources ==
- Barnouw, Erik, Documentary: A History of the Non-fiction Film, Oxford University Press US, 1993, pp. 116–120. ISBN 0-19-507898-5
- Metropolitan Opera, Chalmers, Thomas (Baritone), MetOpera Database
- New York Times, "Carmen Sung at Century", December 24, 1913, p. 11.
- New York Times, "Vilma F. Chalmers Has Church Bridal", December 31, 1937.
- New York Times, "Thomas Chalmers, 82, Dead; Actor, Singer and Filmmaker", June 12, 1966, p. 87
- Saerchinger, César (ed.), International who's who in music and musical gazetteer, Current Literature Pub. Co., 1918, p. 3.
- Thompson, Oscar, The American Singer A Hundred Years Of Success In Opera, The Dial Press, Inc., 1937, p. 246.
