= Heart to Heart (1949 film) =

1949 film

- Directed by: Gunther von Fritsch
- Written by: Herbert Morgan
- Produced by: Herbert Morgan
- Cinematography: Floyd Crosby
- Edited by: Chester W. Schaeffer
- Production company: Fact Film Organization
- Distributed by: Metro-Goldwyn-Mayer
- Release date: 1949
- Running time: 21 minutes
- Country: United States
- Language: English

Heart to Heart is a 1949 American short documentary film about heart disease directed by Gunther von Fritsch. It was nominated for an Academy Award for Best Documentary Short.
