= Redes (film) =

Mexican film

- Directed by: Fred Zinnemann; Emilio Gómez Muriel
- Written by: Agustín Velázquez Chávez; Paul Strand; Emilio Gómez Muriel; Fred Zinnemann; Henwar Rodakiewicz
- Produced by: Carlos Chávez (for the Secretaría de Educación Pública)
- Starring: Silvio Hernández; David Valle González; Rafael Hinojosa; Antonio Lara; Miguel Figueroa; David Valles Gonzales
- Cinematography: Paul Strand
- Edited by: Emilio Gómez Muriel; Gunther von Fritsch
- Music by: Silvestre Revueltas
- Release dates: 1936 (Mexico); 1937 (USA)
- Running time: 65 minutes
- Country: Mexico
- Language: Spanish

Redes is a Mexican film, released in 1936, about the fishing community of Alvarado on the Gulf Coast of Mexico, near the city of Veracruz. The film's title comes from the Spanish word redes ("nets") in reference to fishing nets. The English-language edition's title is The Wave (apparently referring to imagery at the end of the film). Redes was made with a mainly non-professional cast and has been seen as anticipating Italian neorealism. It concerns the struggle of poor fishermen to overcome exploitation. The film was directed by Fred Zinnemann and Emilio Gómez Muriel who were both also among the co-writers.

== Production ==
Paul Strand began work on the project, which was originally conceived as a documentary, in 1933. He had come to Mexico at the invitation of the Mexican composer Carlos Chávez, who had a government job promoting the arts under the socialist education minister Narciso Bassols. The film developed into a work of fiction with a scenario by Strand and Agustín Chávez, nephew of the composer.

Towards the end of 1933, Henwar Rodakiewicz, a friend of Strand's from the Camera Club of New York, arrived to assist in the production. Rodakiewicz determined that the scenario was ragged and incoherent. Before returning to the US for a few months, he wrote a shooting script for the film and made arrangements for his friend, Fred Zinnemann, to travel to Alvarado to take on the role of director. Zinnemann did not speak Spanish, while his co-director Emilio Gómez Muriel worked directly with the actors. The crew included still photographer Ned Scott. Filming was done on location in Alvarado, and the sound was added later.

Strand had left-wing views and was influenced by Eisenstein (whose Battleship Potemkin includes imagery of waves). Zinnemann cited Robert Flaherty as an influence.

The production was affected by political developments in 1934. Bassols resigned as minister of education in May and Carlos Chávez was replaced. Work on Redes continued under Chávez' successor, Antonio Castro Leal. However, Strand was warned that funding could not be guaranteed beyond the end of the year, when a new president was due to take office. He left Mexico early in 1935 with the film still unreleased.

== Film music ==
The Mexican composer Silvestre Revueltas, who had not previously written film music, was commissioned to provide the score in 1934. Revueltas was a protégé of Carlos Chávez, who had appointed him as assistant conductor of the Symphony Orchestra of Mexico: however, the two men fell out around the time of the commission (possibly because Chávez had expected to write the music). Revueltas visited Alvarado during the shooting, and composed quickly.

The score is considered a classic of film music. As the music rarely overlaps with dialogue, it has been possible to show the film with live orchestral accompaniment. Redes is one of the few pieces of Mexican film music to have entered the concert repertory. Revueltas made an orchestral suite from the Redes score, which he premiered in 1936. However, in concert performance the music is usually heard in an arrangement by Erich Kleiber, made in the 1940s after the composer's death. Kleiber's version is in two parts and lasts about 16 minutes.

== Release ==
Despite the problems in making the film, it appears to have been more or less finished in 1935. More editing was done before its release in Mexico in 1936. The film was released in France and the US in 1937. It was restored in 2009 by the World Cinema Foundation.

== Critical reception ==
The New York Times' film reviewer was dismissive of the quality of the narrative, but acknowledged the merits of the photography and music. The New York Times also published an article by Aaron Copland praising Revueltas' music. Copland said that for the Mexican Government to choose Revueltas to supply the music for The Wave is very much like the U.S.S.R. asking Shostakovich to supply sound for its best pictures.
