= Scarecrow (comics) =

Scarecrow in comics, may refer to:

- Scarecrow (DC Comics), supervillain from DC Comics who fought Batman
- Scarecrow (Marvel Comics), supervillain from Marvel Comics who fought heroes such as Spider-Man and Ghost Rider
- Straw Man (comics), superhero from Marvel Comicsoriginally named Scarecrow

== See also ==
- Scarecrow (disambiguation)
