= The City (1939 film) =

1939 film by Ralph Steiner and Willard Van Dyke

- Directed by: Ralph Steiner; Willard Van Dyke
- Narrated by: Morris Carnovsky
- Release date: 1939
- Running time: 43 minutes
- Country: United States
- Language: English

The City is a pioneering short documentary film from 1939 that contrasts the problems of the contemporary urban environment with the superior social and physical conditions that can be provided in a planned community. It was directed and photographed by Ralph Steiner and Willard Van Dyke based on a treatment by Lewis Mumford, which was in turn based on an outline by Pare Lorentz. Aaron Copland wrote the musical score, and Morris Carnovsky provided the narration.

== Summary ==
The film follows a historical sequence and uses the following locations:

1. In the Beginning – New England (a rural 18th-Century community)
2. The Industrial City (Pittsburgh)
3. The Metropolis – Men into Steel (Manhattan)
4. The Highway – The Endless City (Sunday traffic congestion in New York and New Jersey)
5. The Green City (Greenbelt, Maryland, and Radburn, New Jersey)

Greenbelt, Maryland, had been constructed a few years earlier as a New Deal project.

Length: 43 minutes and 43 seconds

== Production ==
The film was the idea of Catherine Bauer, an urban planner and public housing advocate. It was produced for the American Institute of Planners (predecessor of the APA) to be shown at the 1939 New York World's Fair as part of the "City of Tomorrow" exhibit. Bauer's original idea was to commission a full-scale mini-neighborhood on a 10-acre (4.0 ha) site to showcase innovative housing design and community planning. This was to be done in conjunction with MoMA. When the plan was dropped for lack of time and resources, Bauer came up with the idea of the film. Robert Kohn agreed and commissioned it. At the end of 1937, Henwar Rodakiewicz moved to New York to assist Steiner in the production, including participating in writing and editing.

== Soundtrack ==
The score, for narrator and orchestra, was written by Aaron Copland and conducted by Max Goberman. The narrator was the New York stage and Hollywood film actor Morris Carnovsky. Writing in the New York Times in 2000, Anthony Tommasini described the score as "by turns beguiling and trenchant." In The Los Angeles Times, Mark Swed has called The City's score "an astonishing missing link not only in the genesis of Copland’s Americana style but in American music and cinema." The complete musical score, without narration, was recorded by the PostClassical Ensemble and was issued on CD in 2022.

This was the first of eight movie scores that Copland would write throughout his career. In 1942, he assembled a five-song suite for small orchestra, consisting of excerpts from his first three film scores, entitled "Music for Movies," which included the compositions "New England Countryside" and "Sunday Traffic" from The City.

The title of this piece is not to be confused with Quiet City, the 1940 work by Aaron Copland, nor with his 1964 orchestral work Music for a Great City.

== Legacy ==
The film was well received when shown at the fair. One study of the fair summarized the film's reception:

The documentary was idealistic, framed with a Ruskinian tragic view of technological modernity in which the early 20th-century industrial city became a wasteland of dehumanizing machines, environmental pollution, and anonymous masses. Critics interpreted the film as a panacea for the unhygenic growth of the modern city, as well as the small but influential Regional Planners of America's promotion of a pastoralist greenbelt idea. The good life could be ensured not by wholesale mechanization, automobiles, and sprawling infrastructures, but by restoring to modern city life a semblance of healthy living and social wellbeing associated with Ebenezer Howard-style community-based garden cities.

In 1998, The City was selected for preservation in the United States National Film Registry by the Library of Congress as being "culturally, historically, or aesthetically significant."

The planned community envisioned in the film— with its attention to scale and shared green space—is sometimes confused by later viewers as representative of suburban development, which was not envisioned when the film was made.

== See also ==
- List of films preserved in the United States National Film Registry
