= How Firm a Foundation =

Christian hymn

- Genre: Hymn
- Written: 1787
- Based on: 1 Peter 1:23 Isaiah 41:10
- Meter: 11.11.11.11
- Melody: "Foundation" by Joseph Funk

"How Firm a Foundation" is a Christian hymn, published in 1787 by John Rippon in A Selection of Hymns from the Best Authors, Intended to be an Appendix to Dr. Watts's Psalms and Hymns, known as "Rippon's Selection." How Firm a Foundation is number 128 in the 1787 first printing. It is attributed only to "K", which probably refers to Robert Keen(e), precentor at Rippon's church, though other names suggested include Richard or John Keene, Kirkham, John Keith or Words by G. Keith and Music by J. Reading as cited in the 1884 publication of Asa Hull's Jewels of Praise. It is most often sung to the tune "Foundation" (or "Protection") which first appeared in A Compilation of Genuine Church Music (1832) edited by Joseph Funk, though the original tune may be Keen(e)'s "Geard".

In 1835, the hymn was included in the first hymnbook introduced by the Church of Jesus Christ of Latter Day Saints. Although officially organized by Joseph Smith, founder of the Latter Day Saint movement, in 1830, his wife, Emma, was charged early-on with collecting hymns for and establishing a hymnbook for the new church. The first hymnbook was published in 1835 in Kirtland, Ohio, by William W. Phelps. This hymn also appeared in the first printing of the Manchester Hymnal in England, making it one of the few hymns published in every edition of the official hymnals of the Church of Jesus Christ of Latter-day Saints, the largest denomination in the Latter Day Saint movement.

In addition, this was the favorite hymn of General Robert E. Lee and has been played at the funerals of several US politicians. On Christmas Eve 1898, American units involved in the Spanish–American War joined to sing the hymn. The units were from the North and the South.

The hymn, along with "Jesus Loves Me," served as the thematic material for Virgil Thomson's Symphony on a Hymn Tune, which was later incorporated into his score for the 1938 documentary film The River. Sections of The River's score were reused in the 1983 television film The Day After.

Don Gillis interspersed the hymn tune throughout his Symphony No. 7 "Saga of a Prairie School", written in honor of his alma mater, Texas Christian University.

== Original lyrics ==
As published in 1787, punctuation and capitalization preserved:

1: How firm a Foundation, ye Saints of the Lord,
Is laid for your Faith in His excellent Word;
What more can he say than to you he hath said?
You, who unto JESUS for Refuge have fled.

2: In every Condition, in Sickness, in Health,
In Poverty's Vale, or abounding in Wealth;
At Home and Abroad, on the Land on the Sea,
"As thy Days may demand, shall thy Strength ever be.

3: "Fear not, I am with thee, oh be not dismay'd,
"I, I am thy GOD, and will still give thee Aid;
"I'll strengthen thee, help thee, and cause thee to stand,
"Upheld by my righteous omnipotent Hand.

4: "When thro' the deep Waters I call thee to go,
"The Rivers of Woe shall not thee overflow;
"For I will be with thee, thy Troubles to bless,
"And sanctify to thee, thy deepest Distress.

5: "When thro' fiery Trials thy Pathway shall lie,
"My Grace all sufficient shall be thy supply;
"The Flame shall not hurt thee, I only design
"Thy Dross to consume, and thy gold to refine.

6: "Even down to old Age, all my People shall prove
"My sovereign, eternal, unchangeable Love;
"And then hoary Hairs shall their Temples adorn,
"Like lambs they shall still in my bosom be borne.

7: "The Soul that on JESUS has leaned for Repose,
"I will not, I will not desert to his Foes;
"That Soul, tho' all Hell should endeavor to shake,
"I'll never—no never—no never forsake.
