= Leo Hurwitz =

Documentary film director

- Born: June 23, 1909; Wiliamsburg, Brooklyn, New York City, U.S.
- Died: January 18, 1991 (aged 81); Manhattan, New York City, U.S.
- Education: Harvard University
- Occupation: Documentary filmmaker
- Years active: 1936–1981
- Spouse(s): Jane Dudley; Peggy Lawson; Nelly Burlingham

Leo Hurwitz (June 23, 1909 – January 18, 1991) was an American documentary filmmaker. Among the films he directed were Native Land (1942) and Verdict for Tomorrow (1961), the Peabody Award-winning and Emmy Award-nominated film of the Eichmann trial. He was blacklisted during the McCarthy period for his strong left-wing political beliefs.

== Background ==
Hurwitz was born on June 23, 1909, in Brooklyn, New York City, to Jewish Lithuanian immigrants. He grew up in the Williamsburg section of Brooklyn. He had four sisters, including dancer Sophia Delza and psychoanalyst Marie Briehl.

Hurwitz saw his first film at the age of four. Mesmerized by this medium of expression, he subsequently immersed himself in it. While in high school, he discovered the Harvard Club scholarship and decided to sit for the exam. Highly gifted and hard working, Hurwitz won the scholarship and attended Harvard University. Although he graduated summa cum laude, he was not granted an international merit-based fellowship for which he'd applied. His tutor, among others, attributed this rejection to his Jewish roots.

== Career ==
Despite his achievements and education, Hurwitz then struggled to secure employment during the Great Depression. In his first few postgraduate years, he was the editor of New Theater Magazine and cameraman and co-writer of the acclaimed film The Plow That Broke the Plains (1936), among others.

=== Workers Film and Photo League ===
Eventually, Hurwitz discovered the Workers Film and Photo League. The League, created in March 1930, included directors and photographers such as Paul Strand, Irving Lerner, Willard Van Dyke, Ralph Steiner, Lionel Berman, Ben Maddow, Sidney Meyers, Jay Leyda, and Lewis Jacobs. The organization was formed in the midst of the Depression and in response to the widespread social and economic disparities and despair of the era. There was a wealth of young intellectuals who, regardless of their education, had no outlet for their creativity. Between 1931 and 1934, there was an enormous increase in workers' art movements across the US. Dozens of leagues formed to support dancers, artists, and eventually filmmakers whose roots were in the working class. Although the Film and Photo League did provide a creative outlet, its main goal was not artistic, and many of the filmmakers aimed to provoke audiences through their work without much regard to the aesthetic value of their films.

=== Nykino ===
Disregard for film aesthetics was something that Hurwitz opposed; after studying the techniques employed by many of the Soviet filmmakers of the time, Hurwitz recognized the importance of editing and the complex beauty of the juxtaposition of shots (in filmic montage) to convey an otherwise undecipherable message. Hurwitz joined with a few other members of the League to create Nykino, an organization that strove to use artistic measures to appeal to audiences while still conveying a meaningful message.

The formation of Nykino was not well received by the League, many of whose members saw the group as elitist, and veering away from the mission of the Workers Film and Photo League. The formation of Nykino also came while the League itself was in decline. As Nykino continued growing and attracting new filmmakers, the League faded to obscurity. Nykino, in producing films that emphasized aesthetic beauty in the interest of affecting audiences, allowed Hurwitz to create a new method of storytelling unlike that of conventional American films of the time.

=== Frontier Films ===
In 1936, Nykino transformed into Hurwitz's co-founded company, Frontier Films, the first nonprofit documentary production company in the United States. While at Frontier Films, Hurwitz made Heart of Spain, a film on the Spanish Civil War, and Native Land about American labor struggles of the 1930s.

During World War II, Hurwitz worked on films for the Office of War Information, the British Information Service, and other government agencies. After the war, in the early days of commercial television, he was a producer-director and chief of news and special events for CBS television. In 1947, he produced Strange Victory, a documentary that dealt with racism in the United States after the war. The film won awards at the Karlovy Vary and Venice Film Festivals.

=== Blacklisted ===
In the 1950s and 1960s, while blacklisted for his strong left-wing political beliefs, Hurwitz continued to work as an independent film maker and, without credit, co-produced, directed and edited several segments for the Omnibus series on CBS. In 1953, he was hired as a consulting director and later editor of Salt of the Earth (1954), but left due to creative differences.

In the mid-1960s, he and six other directors brought a lawsuit against the Directors Guild of America that resulted in a United States Supreme Court decision forcing the guild to remove a loyalty oath from its membership application.

=== Eichmann trial and 1960s work ===
In 1961, Hurwitz directed the television coverage of the Adolf Eichmann trial in Jerusalem for producer Milton Fruchtman and Capital Cities Broadcasting Corporation, including the summary documentary Verdict for Tomorrow. Fruchtman and Capital Cities won a Peabody Award for the Eichmann trial in 1961, while Capital Cities was nominated for an Emmy Award for the trial in 1962. In the 2015 BBC television film The Eichmann Show, a dramatization of the trial and making of Verdict for Tomorrow, Hurwitz was played by Anthony LaPaglia.

From 1964 to 1966 he made a group of films for National Educational Television, including Essay on Death, dealing with the assassination of President John F. Kennedy, The Sun and Richard Lippold and In Search of Hart Crane.

=== NYU ===
From 1969 to 1974, Hurwitz was professor of film and chairman of the Graduate Institute of Film and Television at New York University. His work has been the subject of several retrospectives showings, including ones at the Museum of Modern Art, the Public Theater and the Cinemathique Francaise in Paris. At his death he was working on a script for a film on the abolitionist John Brown.

== Personal life and death ==
Hurwitz married then later divorced choreographer Jane Dudley; their son, Tom Hurwitz, is a documentary cinematographer. His second marriage was to Peggy Lawson who died in 1971. His third wife, Nelly Burlingham, died in 2019.

Leo Hurwitz died age 81 on January 18, 1991, of colon cancer at his home in New York City.

== Filmography ==
As Director:

- Dialogue with a Woman Departed (1980)
- Verdict for Tomorrow (1961)
- The Museum and the Fury (1956)
- U.S.A. (1955), a travelogue that presents a tour of the United States for USIA
- Strange Victory (1948)
- Native Land (1942)

As (Co-)Producer:

- Dialogue with a Woman Departed (1980)
- Discovery in a Landscape (1970)
- Light and the City (1970)
- The Museum and the Fury (1956)
- Strange Victory (1948)
- Native Land (1942)
- Heart of Spain (1936)

As Cinematographer:

- The Specialist (1999)
- Dialogue with a Woman Departed (1980)
- The Plow That Broke the Plains (1936)

In the 2015 British drama film The Eichmann Show, Anthony LaPaglia portrayed Leo Hurwitz.

== See also ==
- Paul Strand
- Workers Film and Photo League (USA)
- The Plow That Broke the Plains (1936)
- Native Land (1942)
