= Feathertop (film) =

1916 film by Henry Vernot

- Directed by: Henry Vernot
- Screenplay by: Paul M. Bryan
- Based on: "Feathertop" by Nathaniel Hawthorne
- Starring: Marguerite Courtot; James Levering
- Cinematography: Andre Balatier
- Production company: Gaumont Co.
- Distributed by: Mutual Film Corp.
- Release date: April 17, 1916
- Running time: 5 reels
- Country: United States
- Language: Silent (English intertitles)

Feathertop is a 1916 American silent comedy-drama film directed by Henry Vernot. The film adapts the 1852 Nathaniel Hawthorne short story of the same name. The film stars Marguerite Courtot. Produced by Gaumont, it was released by Mutual on April 17, 1916.

== Cast ==
- Marguerite Courtot as Elsie Green/Polly Goodkin
- James Levering as Tom Green
- Gerald Griffin as Captain Dick Green
- Mathilde Baring as Aunt Sarah Green
- Charles Graham as Henry Green
- Sidney Mason as Ward Roberts
- John Reinhard as Percy Morleigh/Feathertop
- Lucille Taft as Society girl
- Richard Garrick (role unspecified)

== Preservation ==
Feathertop is currently presumed lost. In February of 2021, the film was cited by the National Film Preservation Board on their Lost U.S. Silent Feature Films list.
