= H2O (1929 film) =

1929 film

H_{2}O
- Directed by: Ralph Steiner
- Release date: 1929 (U.S.)
- Running time: 13 minutes
- Country: United States
- Languages: Silent film English intertitles

H_{2}O (1929) is a short silent film by photographer Ralph Steiner. It is a cinepoem showing water in its many forms.

Through innovative camera techniques and editing, H_{2}O captures the element of water in its various forms, from tranquil lakes and flowing rivers to cascading waterfalls and crashing waves. The film immerses viewers in a visual journey, revealing the beauty and power of this essential element.

H_{2}O was created outside narrative structure, opting instead for a poetic and impressionistic approach to storytelling. It invites viewers to contemplate the intrinsic qualities of water and its significance in the natural world.

H_{2}O is a landmark in experimental filmmaking, showcasing the artistic potential of cinema as a medium for exploring elemental themes and abstract concepts.

In 2005, H_{2}O was selected for preservation in the United States National Film Registry by the Library of Congress as being "culturally, historically, or aesthetically significant".

The film can be seen on the Library of Congress website.
