= John Franklin Carter =

American novelist (1897–1967)

- Born: April 27, 1897; Fall River, Massachusetts; United States
- Died: November 28, 1967 (aged 70); Washington, D.C. United States
- Other names: Jay Franklin; Diplomat; Unofficial Observer
- Education: Yale University
- Occupations: Journalist; columnist; novelist; biographer; speech writer
- Employer(s): London Daily Chronicle; New York Times; Liberty; Vanity Fair; Harry S. Truman
- Known for: We The People (1936–1948)
- Parent: Rev. John Franklin Carter

John Franklin Carter a.k.a. Jay Franklin a.k.a. Diplomat a.k.a. Unofficial Observer (1897–1967) was an American journalist, columnist, biographer and novelist. He wrote the syndicated column, "We The People", using his pseudonym Jay Franklin. He produced more than 30 books on a variety of topics, including detective novels about the character Dennis Tyler. In his column, he was one of the few who predicted Truman's victory in the 1948 presidential election.

== Biography ==
Carter was born in Fall River, Massachusetts on April 27, 1897, as one of seven children of The Rev. John Franklin Carter. He attended Yale University, where he served as chairman of the campus humor magazine The Yale Record.

He quit Yale early to serve as a representative of the Williamstown Institute of Politics in Italy. Afterwards, he became the Rome correspondent for the newspapers London Daily Chronicle and the New York Times.

In 1928, Carter began working for the United States Department of State as an economic specialist.

In 1935, he was hired by Rexford Tugwell as information chief for the newly created Resettlement Administration. The documentary moviemaker Pare Lorentz was supervised by him.

Carter then became a correspondent for the magazines Liberty and Vanity Fair.

In 1941, Carter was appointed by President Franklin Delano Roosevelt to investigate the loyalty of Japanese Americans in communities on the West Coast of the United States. Carter hired Curtis B. Munson to compile the Report on Japanese on the West Coast of the United States. Carter summarized Muson's report and sent it to President Franklin Delano Roosevelt on November 7, 1941, about two months before the complete report reached FDR on January 9, 1942. The summarized version emphasized the disloyalty of Japanese Americans and allegedly represented the complete report inaccurately.

He wrote the syndicated column, "We, The People" from 1936 to 1948 using his pseudonym "Jay Franklin". It commented on the administrations of Presidents Franklin D. Roosevelt and Harry S. Truman.

In 1948, Carter worked as a speech writer for Harry S. Truman.

Carter died in Washington, D.C., on November 28, 1967, at the age of 70. His books The New Dealers (1934) and American Messiahs (1935) remain valuable sources for historians of the New Deal era.

== Works ==
Detective novels written as "Diplomat"

- Murder in the Embassy (1930)
- Murder in the State Department (1930)
- Scandal in the Chancery (1931)
- The Corpse on the White House Lawn (1932)
- Death in the Senate (1933)
- Slow Death At Geneva (1934)
- The Brain Trust Murder (1935)

Partial list of other novels

- The Rat Race (1950)
- Champagne Charlie (1950)

Political Narrative written as "Unofficial Observer"

- The New Dealers (1934)
- American Messiahs (1935)

Non-fiction

- Remaking America. Boston, Houghton Mifflin Company, 1942. Also available from HathiTrust.
