= Traffic with the Devil =

1946 film

- Directed by: Gunther von Fritsch
- Written by: Herbert Morgan
- Produced by: Herbert Morgan
- Starring: Charles Reineke; Ben Hall (uncredited); Ralph Montgomery (uncredited)
- Narrated by: Charles Reineke
- Cinematography: Floyd Crosby
- Music by: William Lava
- Distributed by: MGM
- Release date: August 31, 1946
- Running time: 19 minutes
- Country: United States
- Language: English

Traffic with the Devil is a 1946 American short drama-documentary film about traffic problems in Los Angeles, directed by Gunther von Fritsch. It was written by Herbert Morgan and produced in cooperation with the Associated Press as part of MGM's Theatre of Life series.

== Plot summary ==
Motorcycle cop Sgt. Charles Reineke of the L.A. Police Department links and narrates a collection of dramatised and real-life incidents to highlight the dangers of driving in the Los Angeles area.

== Cast ==
- Charles Reineke as narrator (as Police Sgt. Charles Reineke)
- Ben Hall as out-of-gas motorist (uncredited)
- Ralph Montgomery as motorist (uncredited)
- Eva Puig as driver of Ford Deluxe convertible (uncredited)
- Jason Robards Sr. as irate motorist(uncredited)
- Ray Spiker as irate motorist, honking horn (uncredited)

== Reception ==
The Hollywood Reporter wrote: "Attempting to adapt techniques of wartime training films to civilian educational use, MGM's two-reel 'fact-film' in the Theatre of Life series, Traffic with the Devil is a worthy effort in the right direction which unfortunately becomes entangled at times in the traffic of unfolding. ... Utilizing Sgt. Charles Reineke of the L.A. police department in his rounds as a connecting link, the two-reeler often blends with easy good humor the day-to-day relations of a motorcycle cop with motorists. Credit a job well begun in public-interest filmizations by writer-producer Herbert Morgan and director Gunther Fritsch."

The Monthly Film Bulletin wrote: "We are shown a speed-cop with a motor-bicycle on the watch. He explains that his search is not purely for delinquents, although he is regarded as everyone's enemy: he is also ready to assist with advice and warning. He cautions a young man whose mascot is the devil. His warning, however, is entirely disregarded and later we see the remains of a car and later still the young man again, who shows signs of having suffered severe injuries. There are close-ups of the various types of driver and the mistakes to which each is prone. We are also shown the results of various types of accident."

== Accolades ==
The film was nominated for an Academy Award for Best Documentary Short.
