= The Scarecrow (opera) =

The Scarecrow, an opera, premiered at the University of Texas at Austin in February–March 2006. The music was written by Joseph Turrin and libretto by Bernard Stambler. The opera is based on Percy MacKaye's play, which was in turn based on Nathaniel Hawthorne's last short story, “Feathertop.”

The Scarecrow was commissioned by a consortium of twelve universities: Eastman School of Music, Hartt School of Music, Yale University, University of Michigan, University of Minnesota, University of North Texas, Baylor University, University of Oklahoma, Arizona State, University of New Mexico, Michigan State, and the University of Texas at Austin. Honorable mention by the American Academy of Arts and Letters Richard Rodgers Award in 2006 and chosen as a finalist in both 2006 and 2017 by the National Opera Association.

== Performance history ==
The world premiere was performed at the McCullough Theatre, University of Texas at Austin Performing Arts Center on February 24, 26 and March 3, 2006. During these performances, a studio recording of the opera was recorded and produced by Mark Sarisky as one of the four initial releases on the University of Texas at Austin School of Music's recording label, Longhorn Music. The recording can be purchased from the following link: https://web.archive.org/web/20091027194901/http://www.music.utexas.edu/longhornmusic/Catalog/Details.aspx?ID=126 . A second staging was presented by the Lyric Opera Theatre at Arizona State University on November 17–18 and December 1–2, 2006.

The work was originally started in 1976 but was not orchestrated until 2006.

== Instrumentation ==
Orchestra: Two flutes (piccolo double), oboe, two clarinets (bass clarinet double), two bassoons (contra bassoon double), two horns, two trumpets, two trombones, harp, piano (harpsichord and celesta double), four cello, bass and two percussionists

== Cast ==
The following includes the premiere cast (also featured on the premiere recording):

- Mother Rigby (mezzo-soprano) - Alta Boover Dantzler
- Feathertop (baritone) - Yoon-Sang Lee
- Justice Goodkin (tenor) - Drake Dantzler
- Polly Goodkin (soprano) - Deanna Waldon
- Governor (bass) - Damon Passmore
- Lady Governor (alto) - Keely Rhodes
- Man 1 (tenor)- Sheldon Alexander
- Man 2 (baritone) - Benjamin Bear
- Man 3 (bass) - Stephen Long
- Woman 1 (soprano) - Juliann Albaugh
- Woman 2 (alto) - Holly Schwartz
- Woman 3 (mezzo-soprano) - Nicole Taylor
- Dickon (optional character*) - Matthew Neumann

Note: *There are two optional monologues at the beginning of each Act, both of which are recited by Dickon. Aside from that, the character is silent but almost always present on stage.
