= Mechanical Principles =

1930 short film by Ralph Steiner

Mechanical Principles (1930)

Mechanical Principles is a 1930 experimental short film directed by Ralph Steiner.

The short explores various mechanical concepts and principles through visual storytelling and cinematography.

== Description ==
The film shows the inner workings of machines, capturing the precision of mechanical motion in detail. Each frame is crafted to showcase various particularities of in the mechanical world.

== Production ==
The film was shot partly at the Chicago Museum of Science.

== Reception ==
The film is considered to border "pure cinema". Jan-Christopher Horak wrote that "Mechanical Principles reveals that for Steiner any aspect of the visual world can fuel a fascination with sight." The film, part of the director's abstract trilogy, has been found "fascinating and more striking than Surf and Seaweed".
