= Native Land =

- Directed by: Leo Hurwitz; Paul Strand
- Written by: Leo Hurwitz; Ben Maddow
- Produced by: Leo Hurwitz
- Starring: Paul Robeson (Narrator/Vocalist); Fred Johnson
- Cinematography: Paul Strand
- Edited by: Lionel Berman; Leo Hurwitz; Bob Stebbins
- Music by: Marc Blitzstein
- Production company: Frontier Films
- Distributed by: Frontier Films
- Release date: 11 May 1942
- Running time: 79 minutes
- Country: United States
- Language: English

Native Land is a 1942 docudrama film directed by Leo Hurwitz and Paul Strand.

== Synopsis ==
A combination of a documentary format and staged reenactments (influenced by the cinematic works of Sergei Eisenstein and Aleksandr Dovzhenko), the independently produced film depicted the struggle of trade unions against union-busting corporations, their spies and contractors. It was based on the 1938 report of the La Follette Committee's investigation of the repression of labor organizing.

Famous African-American singer, actor and activist Paul Robeson participated as an off-screen narrator and vocalist.

== Cast ==
- Paul Robeson as Narrator and vocalist (voice)
- Fred Johnson as Fred Hill, a farmer
- Mary George as Hill's wife
- John Rennick as Hill's son
- Amelia Romano as Window scrubber
- Houseley Stevenson as White sharecropper
- Louis Grant as Black sharecropper
- James Hanney as Mack, Union president
- Howard Da Silva as Jim, an informer
- Art Smith as Harry Carlyle
- John Marley as Thug with crowbar

== Legacy ==
=== Restoration and re-release ===
A restored version of the film was released in 2011. The film was restored by the UCLA Film & Television Archive, funded by the Packard Humanities Institute.

The new print was made “from the original 35mm nitrate picture negative, a 35mm safety duplicate negative, and a 35mm safety up-and-down track negative.”

The restoration premiered at the UCLA Festival of Preservation on March 26, 2011 and was screened at other North American cities in 2011, including Vancouver.
