= Sophia Delza =

American dancer, choreographer, author, and tai chi teacher

- Born: 1903; Brooklyn, New York City, USA
- Died: June 27, 1996 (aged 92); New York City, USA
- Education: Hunter College
- Occupations: dancer, choreographer, author, and tai chi teacher
- Spouse: A. Cook Glassgold

Sophia Delza Glassgold (1903 – June 27, 1996), born Sophie Hurwitz, was an American modern dancer, choreographer, author, and practitioner of Wu-style tai chi, which she taught at her school in New York City. She authored the first English language book on tai chi, T'ai Chi Ch'uan: Body and Mind in Harmony. Through her books, articles, lectures, and television appearances, Delza promoted the practice of tai chi for health and fitness, and was one of the first popularizers of Chinese martial arts in the United States.

== Early life and education ==
Delza was born in Brooklyn into a Jewish family. She was a sibling of documentary filmmaker Leo Hurwitz, and psychoanalyst Marie Briehl. She initially learned to dance from her sister, Elizabeth Delza, who also went on to a successful career as a dancer. She performed with her sister at the Neighborhood Playhouse in the 1920s. In 1924, she graduated with a degree in science from Hunter College and entered graduate school at Columbia University. She later travelled to Paris to continue her studies in dance.

== Career ==
After returning to the United States, Delza worked in vaudeville, and in stage and film productions. She danced opposite James Cagney in the Grand Street Follies of 1928. She also studied Spanish dance and received a grant to study folk dance forms in Mexico. When Anna Sokolow's Dance Unit needed a new space to rehearse in, Delza made her studio on West 16th Street available to them. In 1937, after the Spanish Civil War broke out, Delza created two anti-fascist works, We Weep for Spain and We March for Spain. She also performed in a "Dances for Spain" concert at the Adelphi Theatre that year, alongside fellow modern dancers Sokolow and Helen Tamiris.

In 1948, Delza accompanied her husband, A. Cook Glassgold, to Shanghai. There, Glassgold worked for the American Jewish Joint Distribution Committee, coordinating post-war relief for Jewish refugees in the Shanghai Ghetto. While in Shanghai, Delza studied Wu-style tai chi under Ma Yueliang. She worked as a dance instructor, and was the first American to teach modern dance in China. During this period, she also studied Chinese theater and Chinese theatrical dancing.

Delza and her husband returned to America in 1951. They lived the rest of their lives in an apartment at the Chelsea Hotel in Manhattan. In 1954, she gave the first documented public demonstration of tai chi in America at the Museum of Modern Art. That same year, she founded the Delza School of Tai Chi Chuan at Carnegie Hall. She subsequently began teaching tai chi as a form of exercise at the United Nations and the Actors Studio. Among her students at the Actors Studio was John Strasberg (son of Lee and Paula Strasberg), who noted that Delza's teaching of the art did not focus on its martial aspects. She also performed demonstrations on television. In 1961 she wrote T'ai Chi Ch'uan: Body and Mind in Harmony, the first English language book on the subject of tai chi.

In 1996, Sophia Delza died at the age of 92 at Beth Israel Medical Center in New York City, soon after publishing her last book, The T'ai-Chi Ch'uan Experience.
