= The Sex Life of the Polyp =

1928 film

- The full film
- Directed by: Thomas Chalmers
- Written by: Robert Benchley
- Produced by: William Fox
- Starring: Robert Benchley
- Distributed by: Fox Film Corporation
- Release date: July 25, 1928
- Running time: 11 minutes
- Country: United States
- Language: English

The Sex Life of the Polyp is a 1928 short film written and performed by Robert Benchley, based on a routine he first did in 1922. The short, which was adapted from an essay by Benchley, documents a dim-witted doctor attempting to discuss the sex life of a polyp to a women's club. This was the second of Benchley's 46 comedy short films, with six made for Fox, one each for Universal Pictures and RKO Radio Pictures, 29 for Metro-Goldwyn-Mayer, and nine for Paramount Pictures.

The film, made in the then-new Fox Movietone sound-on-film process, was a success and was later included in the compilation Robert Benchley and the Knights of the Algonquin.

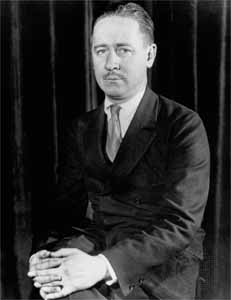
Robert Benchley

In 2007, the film was selected for preservation in the United States National Film Registry by the Library of Congress as being "culturally, historically, or aesthetically significant".
