= Henwar Rodakiewicz =

Henwar Rodakiewicz (1903–1976) was an American filmmaker.

== Career ==
The Roots of Happiness, a 1953 documentary directed by Rodakiewicz

Rodakiewicz made the 1931 experimental documentary Portrait of a Young Man in Three Movements. It structures visual elements such as smoke, water, and plants into an abstract montage. He considered adding a soundtrack but decided against it, feeling it would be redundant to the montage. The Amateur Cinema League named it one of the ten best films of 1932, calling it "beautiful, exciting, workmanlike and distinguished."

Rodakiewicz worked on Paul Strand's 1936 film Redes and Ralph Steiner's 1939 film The City.

== Personal life ==
Rodakiewicz married twice, first to poet and ranch ownder Marie Tudor Garland and second to Peggy Bok.
