= Puritan Passions =

1923 film by Frank Tuttle

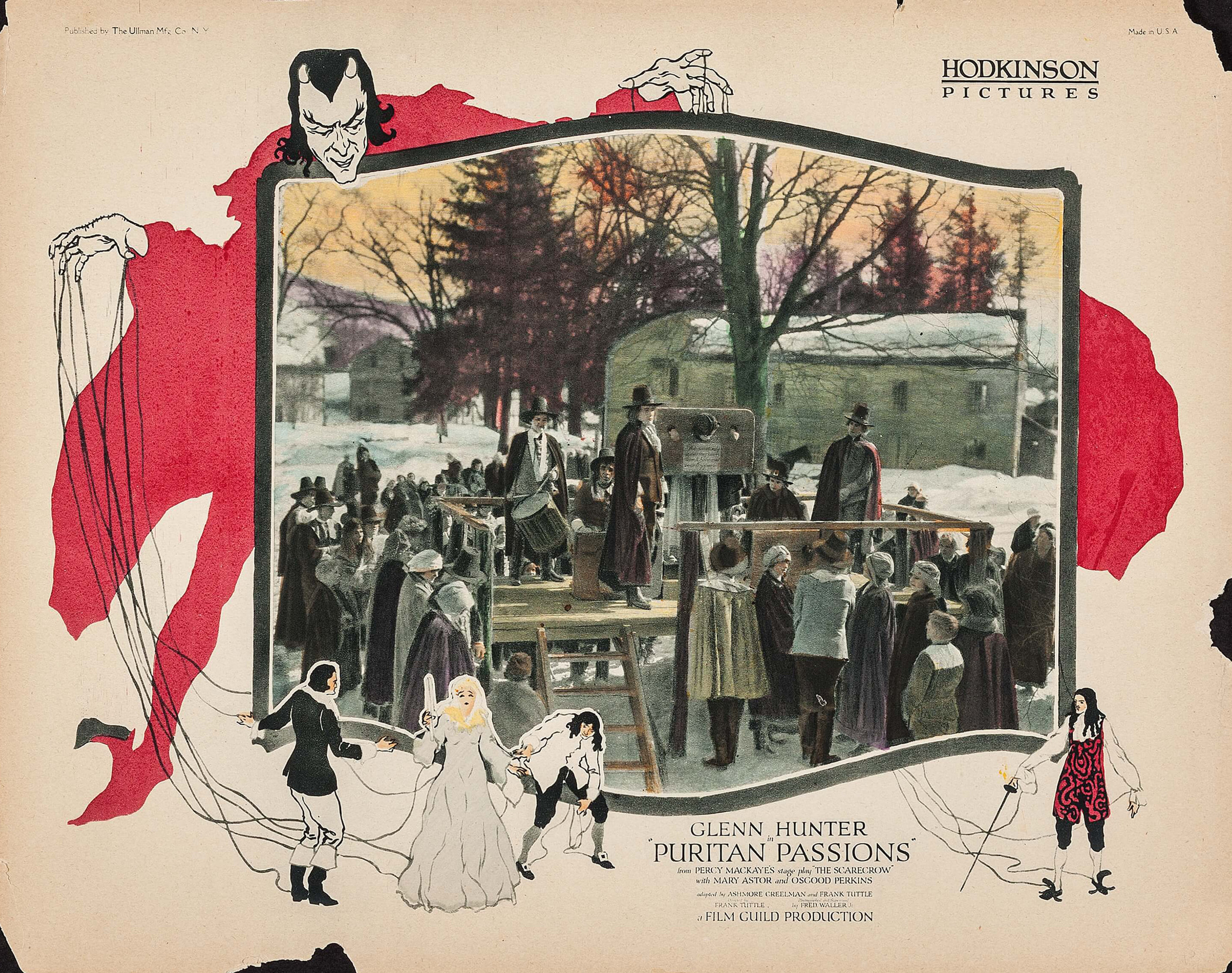
- Lobby card
- Directed by: Frank Tuttle
- Written by: Frank Tuttle; James Ashmore Creelman
- Starring: Maude Hill; Glenn Hunter; Osgood Perkins; Thomas Chalmers; Mary Astor
- Cinematography: Fred Waller
- Distributed by: W. W. Hodkinson Corporation
- Release date: September 9, 1923
- Running time: 70 minutes
- Country: United States
- Language: Silent

Puritan Passions is a 1923 silent film directed by Frank Tuttle, based on Percy MacKaye's 1908 play The Scarecrow, which was itself based on Nathaniel Hawthorne's short story "Feathertop". The film stars Glenn Hunter, Mary Astor, and stage actor Osgood Perkins. It follows the play faithfully, except that Osgood Perkins' character is called Dickon in the play and Dr. Nicholas in the movie, and Justice Gilead Merton is renamed Justice Gilead Wingate in the film. It is the only theatrical film version – so far – of Percy MacKaye's play, though there were previously two silent film versions of Hawthorne's original story.

== Plot ==
Goody Rickby is impregnated by the wealthy Gilead Wingate, after which he refuses to accept the responsibility of fatherhood. Rickby decides to use black magic to get revenge on Wingate. She succeeds in summoning Satan before her, and together they concoct a scheme to punish the man who wronged her. Satan creates a living being from a scarecrow and the creature adopts the human identity of "Lord Ravensbane" so that he can function unsuspected in society. Satan instructs his creature to seduce Wingate's niece Rachel and fool the villagers into believing the Wingates are all witches. Ravensbane develops emotions and a soul, however, and genuinely falls in love with the young lady, foiling the Devil's plans.

== Cast ==
- Glenn Hunter - Lord Ravensbane/The Scarecrow
- Mary Astor - Rachel
- Osgood Perkins - Dr. Nicholas
- Maude Hill - Goody Rickby
- Frank Tweed - Gillead Wingate
- Dwight Wiman - Bugby
- Thomas Chalmers - The Minister
- Elliot Cabot - Richard Talbot

== Preservation status ==
- This film is now lost.
