= Resettlement Administration =

US federal agency, 1935 to 1937

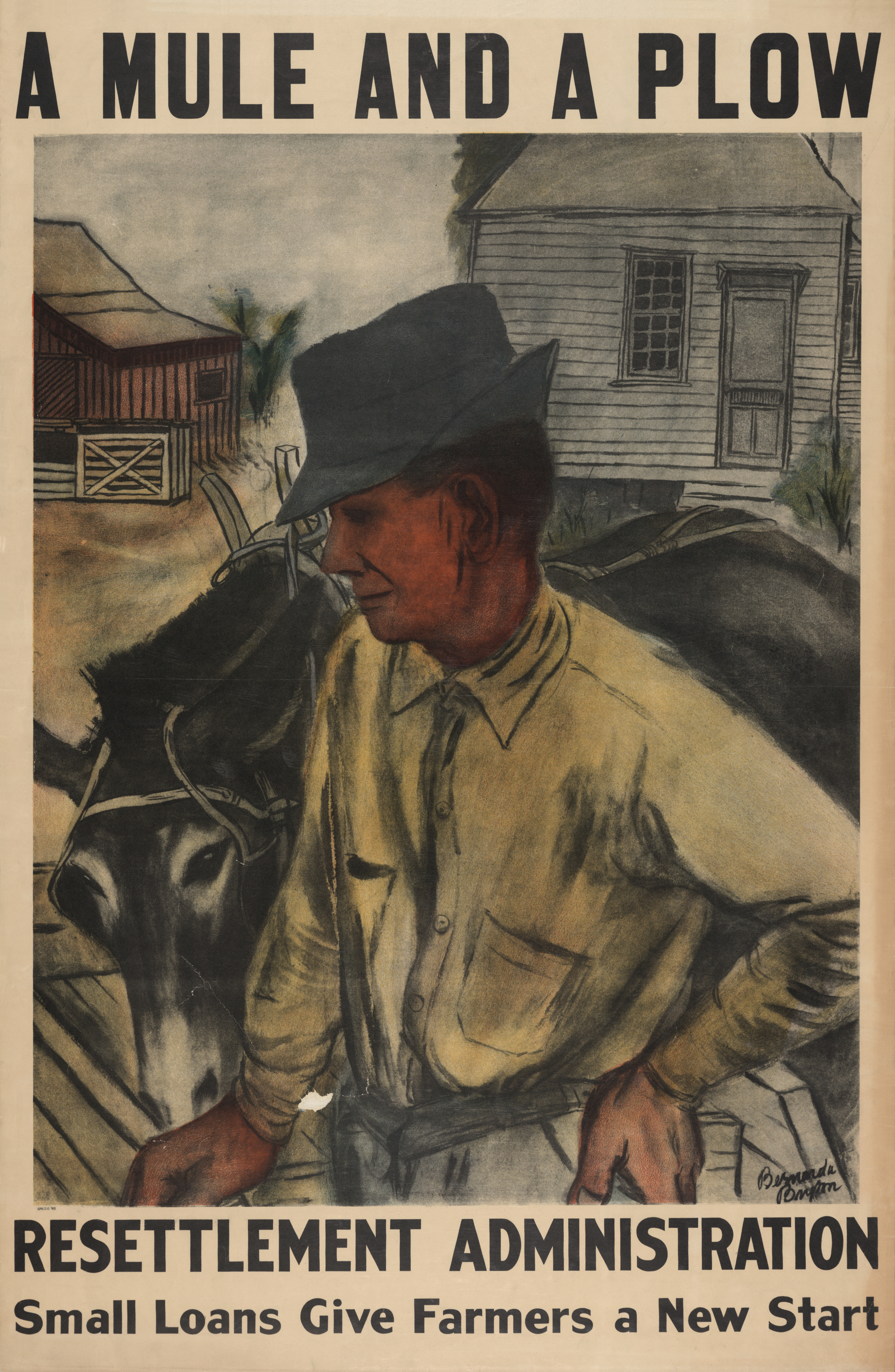
- Resettlement Administration poster by Bernarda Bryson Shahn (c. 1936)

Agency overview
- Formed: May 1, 1935
- Preceding agency: Subsistence Homesteads Division (DSH or SHD), United States Department of the Interior
- Dissolved: September 1, 1937
- Superseding agency: Farm Security Administration
- Agency executive: Rexford G. Tugwell, Head

The Resettlement Administration (RA) was a New Deal U.S. federal agency created May 1, 1935. It relocated struggling urban and rural families to communities planned by the federal government. On September 1, 1937, it was succeeded by the Farm Security Administration.

== History ==
The RA was the brainchild of Rexford G. Tugwell, an economics professor at Columbia University who became an advisor to Franklin D. Roosevelt during the latter's successful campaign for the presidency in 1932 and then held positions in the United States Department of Agriculture. Roosevelt established the RA under Executive Order 7027, as one of the New Deal's "alphabet agencies", and Tugwell became its head.

The divisions of the new organization included Rural Rehabilitation, Rural Resettlement, Land Utilization, and Suburban Resettlement. Roosevelt transferred the Federal Emergency Relief Administration land program to the Resettlement Administration under Executive Order 7028 on May 1, 1935.

However, Tugwell's goal of moving 650,000 people from 100 million acres (400,000 km^{2}) of agriculturally exhausted, worn-out land was unpopular among the majority in Congress. This goal seemed socialistic to some and threatened to deprive influential farm owners of their tenant workforce. The RA was thus left with enough resources to relocate only a few thousand people from 9 million acres (36,000 km^{2}) and build several greenbelt cities, which planners admired as models for a cooperative future that never arrived.

== Relief camps for migrant workers ==
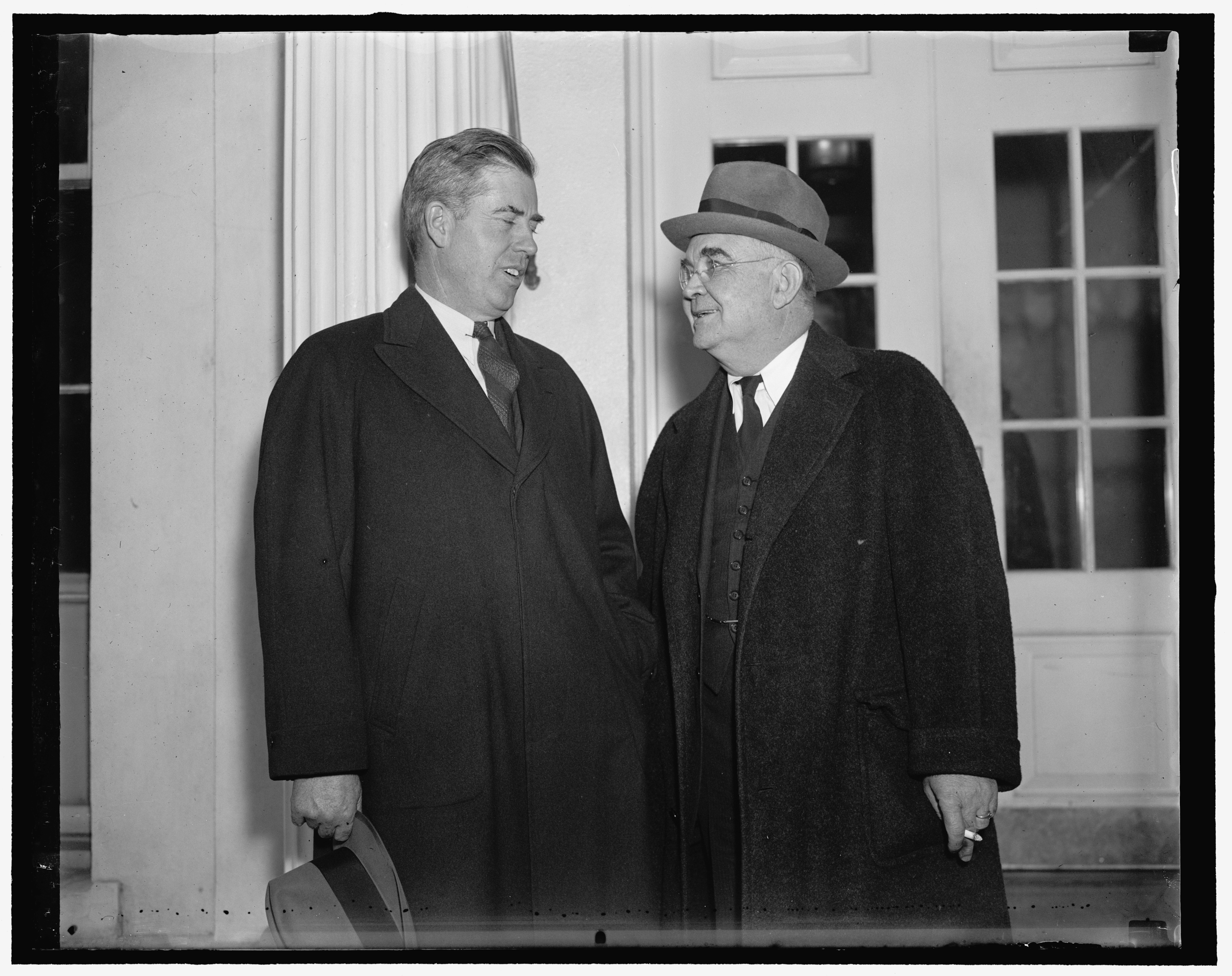
Secretary of Agriculture Henry A. Wallace (left) with Will W. Alexander, appointed to head the Resettlement Administration (December 22, 1936)

The main focus of the RA was to build relief camps in California for migratory workers, especially refugees from the drought-struck Dust Bowl of the Southwest. This move was resisted by a large portion of Californians, who did not want destitute migrants to settle in their midst. The RA managed to construct 95 camps that gave migrants (unaccustomed to clean quarters) housing with running water and other amenities, but the 75,000 people who had the benefit of the camps were a small share of those in need and even they could stay only temporarily. Tugwell resigned in 1936, wanting to prevent a red-baiting campaign against him from affecting the entire agency.

On January 1, 1937, with hopes of making the RA more effective, the Resettlement Administration was transferred to the Department of Agriculture through executive order 7530. In the face of Congressional criticism, in September 1937 the Resettlement Administration was folded into a new body, the Farm Security Administration (FSA), which operated until 1946.

== Communities and greenbelt cities ==
The RA worked with nearly 200 communities on its projects, including:

- Aksarben, Nebraska
- Arthurdale, West Virginia, (first community begun by Subsistence Homesteads and pet project of Eleanor Roosevelt)
- Cahaba Village in Trussville, Alabama (begun by the Works Progress Administration)
- Caney Lakes Recreation Area in Webster Parish, Louisiana
- Christian-Trigg Farms near Hopkinsville, Kentucky (built by the RA and Farm Security Administration)
- Cumberland Homesteads near Crossville, Tennessee (begun by the Division of Subsistence Homesteads)
- Farmstead / Jasper, Alabama, this development, began by the WPA, included 40 homes, churches, a civic center, and a school.
- Greenbelt, Maryland, completely planned and constructed by the RA outside Washington, D.C.
- Greendale, Wisconsin, another new town built by the RA, outside Milwaukee, Wisconsin
- Greenhills, Ohio, the third of the RA's new towns, built outside Cincinnati, Ohio
- Hickory Ridge, Virginia (now Prince William Forest Park)
- Greenbrook, New Jersey (planned by the RA but never built)
- Matanuska Valley Colony, Alaska (near what is now Palmer, Alaska)
- Mileston, Mississippi, one of thirteen resettlement communities that were entirely African-American
- Palmerdale in Pinson, Alabama (parts built by the Works Progress Administration)
- Jersey Homesteads in Monmouth County, New Jersey (begun by the Division of Subsistence Homesteads)
- Tillery, North Carolina
- Ropesville, Texas

The Weedpatch Camp (also known as the Arvin Federal Government Camp and the Sunset Labor Camp), now on the National Register of Historic Places, was built in 1936 south of Bakersfield, California — not by the Resettlement Administration but by the Works Progress Administration. The camp inspired John Steinbeck's 1939 novel, The Grapes of Wrath.

== Photography, film, and folk song projects ==
The RA also funded projects recording aspects of its work and context, including:

- The Photography Project, which documented the rural poverty of the Great Depression and produced thousands of images that are now stored and available at the Library of Congress, was headed up by Roy Stryker.
- The Film Project, which produced two documentaries directed by Pare Lorentz and scored by Virgil Thomson, The Plow That Broke the Plains and The River.
- Sidney Robertson Cowell's recordings of folk songs, conducted during the summer of 1937, sponsored by the RA's Special Skills Division, and now stored at the University of Wisconsin.

== See also ==
- Dust Bowl
- National Industrial Recovery Act of 1933
- Subsistence Homesteads Division
