= Feathertop =

- Short story by Nathaniel Hawthorne
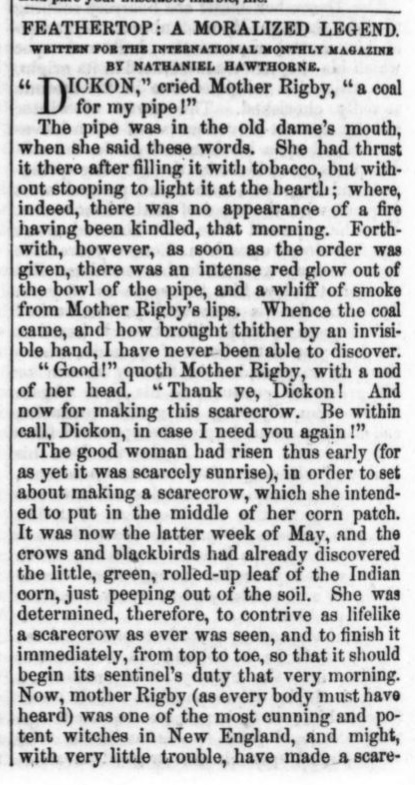
- Country: United States
- Language: English
- Genre: Short story

Publication
- Published in: The International Magazine
- Publication date: 1852

"Feathertop" is a short story by Nathaniel Hawthorne, first published in 1852. The moral tale uses a metaphoric scarecrow named Feathertop and its adventure to offer the reader a conclusive lesson about human character. It has since been used and adapted in several other media forms, such as opera and theatre.

== Plot ==
In seventeenth century New England, the witch Mother Rigby builds a scarecrow to protect her garden. She is so taken with her own handiwork that she whimsically decides to bring the scarecrow to life and send it into town to woo Polly Gookin, the daughter of Judge Gookin, with whom Mother Rigby had unspecified prior dealings. Once the stuffed man does come alive, Mother Rigby gives him the appearance of a normal human being and provides a pipe, on which the scarecrow must puff to keep himself alive.

Judge Gookin meets the scarecrow, whom Mother Rigby has named Feathertop. Feathertop is introduced to Polly, and the two begin to fall in love. But when Polly and Feathertop gaze into a bewitched mirror, they see Feathertop reflected as a scarecrow, not as a man. Polly faints, and the now-terrified and anguished scarecrow rushes back to Mother Rigby, where, knowing himself for what he really is, he deliberately throws away his pipe and collapses in a lifeless heap. Mother Rigby reflects, "There are thousands upon thousands of coxcombs and charlatans in the world, made up of just such a jumble of wornout, forgotten, and good-for-nothing trash as he was! Yet they live in fair repute, and never see themselves for what they are," and decides that her "son" is better off as merely a scarecrow.

== Publication history ==
Hawthorne first offered the tale to John Sullivan Dwight, who had asked for a contribution to Sartain's Union Magazine in November 1851. He demanded $100 for it. He admitted to John Sartain that the fee was a high one and noted, "I myself would not pay it, were I in the chair editorial". Instead, "Feathertop: A Moralized Legend" was published in two parts in The International Magazine, edited by Rufus Wilmot Griswold, in February and March 1852. It was the last new adult tale Hawthorne wrote.

The story was later collected in 1854 as part of a revised edition of Mosses from an Old Manse.

== In other media ==
"Feathertop" was adapted twice as a silent film, in 1912 and in 1916. It was adapted for television twice as well. The first television version, adapted by Maurice Valency, Professor of Comparative Literature at Columbia University, was presented in 1955 as part of the General Electric Theater, with a cast that included Natalie Wood, Carleton Carpenter, Dick Elliott, and Emory Parnell. The second television version was presented in 1961 by ABC-TV as a musical special, starring Hugh O'Brian and Jane Powell, with Cathleen Nesbitt and Hans Conried. The music was written by Mary Rodgers and the lyrics by Martin Charnin.

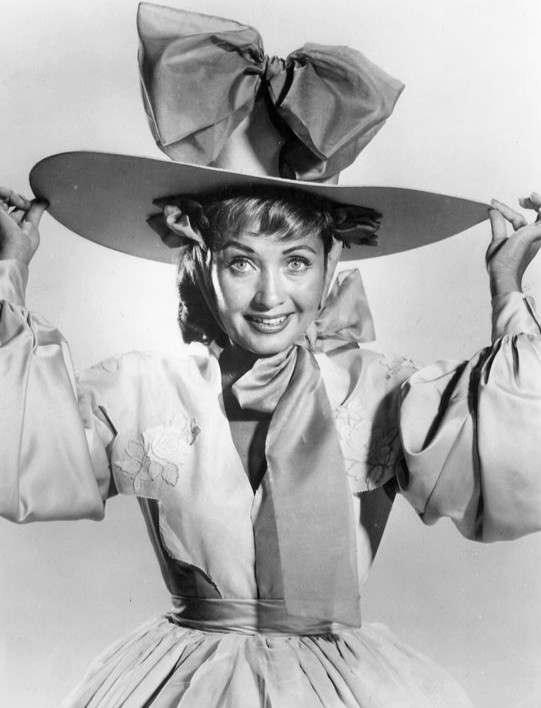
Jane Powell in the 1961 musical presentation.

The story, much embellished, was first dramatized in 1908 as The Scarecrow, a full-length, four-act romantic melodrama by American poet-playwright Percy MacKaye. Most of the characters were renamed, and Mother Rigby (renamed Goody Rickby) was given a definite reason to hate the Judge, Polly (now known as Rachel) was given a fiancé who is constantly jealous of the Scarecrow, and the story was given a more poignant and sentimental ending. The Devil does not appear in "Feathertop", but he is one of the major characters in The Scarecrow.

The Scarecrow (full 1972 television film)

The play was adapted as a silent film in 1923 under the title Puritan Passions. The play was also presented on television in 1972, with a cast headed by Gene Wilder and Blythe Danner, and featuring Pete Duel, Norman Lloyd, Will Geer and Nina Foch in support.

MacKaye's play has also been adapted twice as an opera, also called The Scarecrow, once in 1945 by Normand and Dorothy Lockwood, and more recently with music by Joseph Turrin and libretto by Bernard Stambler.

"Feathertop" also inspired the 1967 Columbia University Varsity Show of the same name, the last such production before the annual revue entered an 11-year interregnum.

Warner Bros. Family Entertainment released a direct-to-video musical titled The Scarecrow on August 26, 2000.

"Feathertop" is mentioned in Bill Willingham's comic book series Fables. He makes a brief appearance in the prose story "A Wolf in the Fold", in which he accompanies Snow White on her trip to Carpathia to convince the Big Bad Wolf to join their community. He is chosen because, not being made of living flesh, his presence won't arouse the wolf's hunger. He's given a more prominent role later in the spin-off miniseries, Everafter.
