= Gunther von Fritsch =

American film director (1906–1988)

- Born: July 15, 1906; Pula, Austria-Hungary (now Croatia)
- Died: August 27, 1988 (aged 82); Pasadena, California, United States
- Occupation: director

Gunther von Fritsch (15 July 1906 – 27 August 1988) was an American film director who was born in Pula, Austro-Hungarian Empire and died in Pasadena.

== Biography ==
Gunther von Fritsch was born 15 July 1906 in Pula. He studied in Paris, and in 1930 moved to the United States and began as an editor and assistant director of films. He married actress Bunny Beatty (real name Hinemoa Gerome Lauri) on 29 June 1937 in Manhattan, New York. They then moved to Los Angeles and had two daughters together. During World War II, he entered the United States Army Signal Corps. After the war, he directed training films for the State Department in West Berlin.

Von Fritsch died of a stroke in Pasadena 27 August 1988. His films won one known award for his work in 1944 when he had co-directed The Curse of the Cat People. In 2020, the film was recognized and awarded a Retro Hugo Award for Best Dramatic Presentation, Short Form for the award year 1945.

== Filmography ==
(incomplete)

| Year | Title | Type | Notes |
|---|---|---|---|
| 1930 | Man Trouble | film | assistant director |
| 1931 | The Spy | film | assistant director |
| 1936 | Wanted – A Master | short | co-director |
| 1943 | Seeing Hands | short | |
| 1944 | The Curse of the Cat People | film | co-director |
| 1946 | Traffic with the Devil | documentary | |
| 1947 | Cigarette Girl | film | director |
| 1947 | Give Us the Earth | documentary | director and cinematographer |
| 1947 | Body and Soul | film | montages director |
| 1949 | Heart to Heart | documentary | |
| 1950 | Big Town | TV series | |
| 1953 | Stolen Identity | film | director |
| 1954 | Flash Gordon | TV series | 8 episodes (of 39) |
| 1970 | Snow Bear | film | director |
