= The Scarecrow (2000 film) =

- VHS Cover
- Directed by: Brian Nissen; Richard Rich
- Screenplay by: Brian Nissen
- Story by: Brian Nissen; Richard Rich
- Based on: short story "Feathertop" by Nathaniel Hawthorne play The Scarecrow by Percy MacKaye
- Produced by: Terry L. Noss; Richard Rich; Thomas J. Tobin
- Starring: Shawn Hoffman; Belinda Montgomery; Ray Porter; Corey Feldman; Paul Masonson
- Edited by: Joe Campana
- Music by: Kurt Bestor
- Production companies: Nest Family Entertainment (Uncredited); Rich Animation Studios
- Distributed by: Warner Home Video
- Release date: August 22, 2000
- Running time: 81 minutes
- Country: United States
- Language: English

The Scarecrow is a 2000 American animated musical fantasy film, written and directed by Brian Nissen and Richard Rich, and based on the Nathaniel Hawthorne short story "Feathertop" and the Percy MacKaye play The Scarecrow. The film was released straight-to-VHS by Warner Bros. under their Family Entertainment label. It is also available for digital download, although it has not been released on DVD or Blu-ray as of 2024.

== Plot ==
The film opens with an elderly woman named Ms. Bee Bee, who reveals herself to be a kindly witch, telling the audience about the town of Grisham Heights during colonial period America, owned by the selfish, wealthy and dance-obsessed Count Grisham. She explains that she was Grisham's former dance teacher, until he chased her into hiding when he accidentally discovered that she was a witch, and was forced to live in an abandoned house far outside of the village, with only her magic broom Bristles for company. She then goes on to explain the town's workhouse mill, which is where all orphans and poor debtors are sent to work off their debts, and that it takes thirteen pieces of silver to buy your freedom. Ms. Bee Bee then introduces the audience to Polly, an orphan girl who has been living in the mill nearly her whole life, but has been saving her silver coins and hiding them at the foot of her scarecrow (without realizing that Ms. Bee Bee lives at the house). Because she is lonely, Ms. Bee Bee decides to bring her scarecrow to life after Polly leaves, using a magic feather to do so, which also allows a pessimistic mouse, Max, who lives in the Scarecrow's pocket, to talk.

As the years pass, Scarecrow begins to fall in love with Polly after her constant visits. It's shown by Ms. Bee Bee that Polly had already earned her required amount of silver a long time ago-(6 years prior), but she decided to stay when three new orphans, Cooper, Farley, and Gretchen had arrived at the workhouse, and wished to help them so they could all leave together. Seeing that Scarecrow is in love with Polly, and worried she'll be discovered and chased away again, Ms. Bee Bee leaves the village, telling Scarecrow that she will miss him and teaches him how to dance. Scarecrow is saddened, but determined to find a way to be with Polly and watch over her money until she is able to free herself and all the children at the workhouse.

Meanwhile, Count Grisham, fully aware of the amount of money she has, wants Polly to be his, and constantly attempts to woo her with promises of giving her and the children a good life and home, though Polly is able to see right through his selfish act and continuously turns him down. On the day she earns the last silver coin they need, Grisham finds out and sends the workhouse mill overseer, Cheswick, to find Polly's silver. Cheswick follows Polly to the old garden, and digs up her money after she leaves, but Scarecrow reveals himself in an attempt to retrieve it and frightens Cheswick, who runs to Grisham's two thugs for help. They corner Scarecrow in the old house, where he discovers a magic feather and a message left to him by Ms. Bee Bee, which tells him that the feather (when worn) will turn him human, but that "real life" will never be his until he is willing to give that life for another.

Scarecrow dons the feather and easily fools Grisham's thugs into believing he is merely a traveler named Feathertop, and they leave, though Cheswick is not convinced and the money is stolen by Grisham's pet hawk, Razor. Meanwhile, Polly returns to the garden to find her money gone, and weeps in despair. The next morning, Grisham comes up with a plan to ensnare Polly with his "love spell dance" to make her his by holding a dance contest, with 52 pieces of silver (the exact amount she needs) as the prize. Feathertop shows off his dancing skills to a crowd in the town square, which prompts Polly to ask him to teach her and be her partner at the dance. During her lesson, the two share a romantic dance and begin to fall in love, until Grisham interrupts to ask Polly to be his partner. He is angry to learn that she already has a partner, and on the night of the contest sends his thugs to trap Feathertop so he cannot attend. Feathertop escapes the thugs and he and Polly win the contest. Feathertop gives all the money to Polly, and the two confess their love for each other, and plan to marry the next morning.

Grisham confronts Feathertop, discovering his true identity. He ties Scarecrow up in the same field and steals his feather, which transforms him into Feathertop upon wearing it, hoping to trick Polly into marrying him, but Bristles and Max manage to remove the feather off of him just before he enters the Church. Grisham tries to force her to marry him, but she, and the priest, refuse to go along with it. Scarecrow manages to escape, and retrieves his feather thanks to Max, but decides to leave Polly because he knows he can never truly be with her. Polly is still waiting for him at the church when Grisham angrily tells his manservant Wooden that he intends to kill Polly for rejecting him, but Wooden abandons him to warn Polly. Bristles, who was eavesdropping, flies off to warn Feathertop.

Polly and the children attempt to escape town in Grisham's carriage, but the only way out is across a bridge over a gorge that Grisham ordered his thugs to weaken. Feathertop arrives and climbs under to hold the supports together until Polly and the children are safely across. Grisham tries to intervene, and in the struggle falls to his death. Feathertop manages to hold the bridge together long enough for the carriage to cross, then falls into the gorge as it collapses. Max and Bristles search the rubble and find him apparently dead, but are overjoyed to see him alive, and they climb out of the gorge together. Polly is waiting at the top, and joyfully embraces Feathertop, who tries to explain why they can't be together, only to realize that his feather fell out of his hat when he climbed out of the gorge, meaning he is now human permanently. He and Polly kiss, and the town celebrates Grisham's demise by cleaning up and holding a large dance in the town square and renaming the town Swingtown, while Ms. Bee Bee brings a girl broom to life for Bristles, and closes the film by addressing the audience the same way she did at the beginning.

== Voice cast ==
- Shawn Hoffman as The Scarecrow/Feathertop
  - David Barrus as The Scarecrow/Feathertop (singing voice)
- Belinda Montgomery as Polly
  - Felicia Sorensen as part of the chorus and Polly (singing voice)
- Ray Porter as Grisham
- Christie Albers as Miss Bee Bee
- Corey Feldman (credited as Edggar Frogg) as Max
- David Llewellyn as Wooden
- Paul Masonson as Cheswick, Gumshoe, and Bristle
- Prince Davidson as Cooper
- Scotty Leavenworth as Farley
- Chelsea Parnell as Gretchen
- Jim J. Bullock as the Magistrate
- Catherine Lavin as the Maid
