= The Scarecrow (Hollywood Television Theatre) =

- Hollywood Television Theatre episode
- Directed by: Boris Sagal
- Written by: Percy MacKaye
- Original air date: January 10, 1972

The Scarecrow is a two-hour American television play that was broadcast on January 10, 1972, as part of the Hollywood Television Theatre series on PBS. It was based on the classic Percy MacKaye play, The Scarecrow, which was in turn based on Nathaniel Hawthorne's short story, "Feathertop".

The cast included Pete Duel (his last role before his suicide in December 1971), Gene Wilder, Blythe Danner, Will Geer, Nina Foch, Joan Tompkins, Sian Barbara Allen and Norman Lloyd. Lewis Freedman was the producer, and Boris Sagal directed.

For her work on The Scarecrow, Jan Scott won a Primetime Emmy Award for Outstanding Achievement in Art Direction or Scenic Design For a Dramatic Program or Feature Length Film Made for Television, a Single Program of a Series or a Special Program.

The television production fell into the United States public domain immediately upon release, because at the time a copyright notice needed to be visibly shown in the film, which the editors failed to provide.
