= The Plow That Broke the Plains =

1936 documentary film by Pare Lorentz

- Directed by: Pare Lorentz
- Written by: Pare Lorentz
- Cinematography: Leo Hurwitz; Ralph Steiner; Paul Strand; Paul Ivano
- Edited by: Pare Lorentz; Ralph Steiner
- Music by: Virgil Thomson
- Distributed by: U.S. Resettlement Administration
- Release date: 1936
- Running time: 25 min. (without Epilogue)
- Country: United States
- Language: English

The Plow That Broke the Plains is a 1936 short documentary film that shows the cultivation of the Great Plains region of the United States and Canada following the Civil War and leading up to the Dust Bowl as a result of exploitation of the Great Plains' natural resources.The Plow That Broke the Plains was the first film created by the US government for commercial release and distribution through the Resettlement Administration as part of President Roosevelt's New Deal program. The Resettlement Administration recruited Pare Lorentz to produce The Plow That Broke the Plains to support its campaign of showing the public that the search for profits in the West resulted in the displacement of settlers, misuse of the land, and ultimately resulted in the dust storms that affected the Great Plains regions in the 1930s. The film was one of the most widely publicized attempts by the U.S. federal government to communicate to its citizens through motion pictures.

The Plow That Broke the Plains was written and directed by Pare Lorentz independently while the music score was written by composer Virgil Thomson. The film was narrated by the American actor and baritone Thomas Hardie Chalmers.

In 1999, The Plow That Broke the Plains was selected for preservation in the United States National Film Registry by the Library of Congress as being "culturally, historically, or aesthetically significant".

== Background ==
The initial inspiration for The Plow That Broke the Plains came from Pare Lorentz's desire to make a film on the New Deal that would provide Americans with a fresh look at their country. Lorentz became particularly interested in the drought and dust storms of the early thirties which inspired him to write a lengthy piece on the Dust Bowl for Newsweek. In 1935, Rexford Tugwell, the head of the Resettlement Administration, initially recruited Pare Lorentz as a film consultant as part of the Resettlement Administration staff, because the agency administrators were interested in creating a film about the Dust Bowl. While the Resettlement Administration sponsored extensive photographic surveys of rural poverty conditions, head of the U.S. Department of Agriculture Henry Wallace and Tugwell became interested in using motion pictures as a medium which would bridge gaps in communication between the government and the public. The Director of Information for the Resettlement Administration John Franklin Carter asked Lorentz if he thought a motion picture could be used to interpret the general objectives of the Resettlement Administration which included: improvement of impoverished farm families, prevention of waste due to improper land use, structured utilization of land resources, recultivation of worn out and submarginal land, and relocation of families. Following Lorentz agreement to focus on land use and misuse and an estimate that the film could be produced with six-thousand dollars, Tugwell put his support behind the production of a film about the Dust Bowl.

In a letter, Tugwell expressed that the film was to function as an internal educational tool for the Resettlement Administration and its employees to visualize and understand better the problems confronting them and to aid the administration in preventing the results of soil erosion related problems in the Great Plains. Additionally, the film was also to align with the goals of the Resettlement Administration and would explain the causes of the Dust Bowl, while also making a strong case for resettling destitute farmers, retiring marginal farmland from production, and restoring the grasslands in the West.

In a review of his own film, Lorentz commented in McCall's Magazine that he had two primary objectives: To show the audience an exciting portion of the country and to portray the events that led to "one of the major catastrophes in American history," the Great Drought and the Dust Bowl. With a limited budget, Lorentz could only map out a small portion of the reality experienced in the Great Plains within a 28-minute frame. He, therefore, had to abstract, simplify, and compress the history of the Great Plains, while still attempting to portray the plains environment and history in a work of art that would not only elicit emotional responses from the audience but coerce them into corrective action that would rehabilitate the area and prevent future ecological catastrophes. Therefore, Lorentz envisioned the film as a "lyric educational exercise, both practical and aesthetic, incorporating the history of the Great Plains from the first cattle drives to the punishing drought then entering its 6th year."

Lorentz's depiction differed from other portrayals of the Great Plains region. While photographers tended to emphasize the people of the plains as blameless victims, and mural artists emphasized the glorious past of the pioneer, Lorentz wanted to present the environmental tale of the Plains as one of decline and refused to see the dust storms as a natural disaster, instead depicting these events as human-created tragedies.

The Plow That Broke the Plains also had the benefit of promoting New Deal programs and as President Roosevelt indicated to Lorentz himself, softening the public for subsequent New Deal measures related to public works and health. The use of film also helped Roosevelt circumvent largely Republican-controlled media platforms to promote New Deal policies. Because the film was also released during an election year, it was bound to also generate political rancor.

== Plot ==
The Plow That Broke the Plains begins with a written prologue appearing as words on the screen that gives a physical description of the Great Plains region as well as a brief history of the plains. Following the written prologue, a map shows the outlines of the Great Plains region within the United States and the political boundaries of the states within it. The motion picture scenes are introduced by displaying the vast grasslands of the Great Plains with narrator Thomas Chalmers speaking about the weather and geographical features of the land, reiterating that the plains are a region with "high winds and sun without rivers, without streams, and with little rain." The following scene introduces the first settlers of the region, the cattle farmers. The narrator continues on, explaining that following the cattle came to the railroads bringing even more settlers who established towns and attracted additional pioneers and plowmen. The next sequences show the arrival of settlers through wagons and caravans as well as the first settlers constructing settlements and breaking the soil in order to farm. The narrator reiterates the phrase "high winds and sun without rivers, without streams, and with little rain" but ends with a warning, "settler, plow at your peril."

Following this, the next sequence shows the mechanization of agriculture and the production of grains and crops. The narrator comes back in as the scene transitions to farmers plowing dry soil and a woman sweeping dust from a staircase, explaining that the "rains failed and the sun baked the light soil" and that "many left" the region. Despite the narrator stating that many settlers were disappointed, a new hope for increasing profits came in the form of World War I. The following scenes show newspapers that display the declaration of World War I and the resulting prices of wheat soaring due to demand. The atmosphere of the film changes to an uplifting and patriotic tone as farmers use mechanized agricultural equipment to prepare the fields for planting and harvesting crops. The narrator exclaims, "wheat will win the war!" multiple times while scenes of wheat and grain production appear alongside scenes of war. While scenes of settlers using mechanized farm equipment to harvest the crops continue, the narrator explains how millions of acres were converted over to farmland followed by more images of newspaper articles announcing that large acreage was available to purchase to establish more farmlands.

Following the scenes showing extensive plowing and harvesting, the film cuts to images of dried land, animal bones, and abandoned farm equipment. The narrator again states that the rain did not come and the sun-baked millions of acres of plowed land, with footage of arid plains. As a result of this desertification, massive dust storms swept across the plains, causing people to take shelter, with homes buried under the dust. The narrator states that "once again they headed West," referring to the settlers losing hope and migrating in search of better opportunities. Within the final sequence, the narrator exclaims "Four hundred million acres the Great Plains seemed inexhaustible yet in 50 years we turned a part of it into a Dust Bowl" and continues to list the factors that led to the Dust Bowl, such as too many cattle and sheep, plowed lands that should have been left untouched, removal of native grasses to hold soil, and farm machines that made it easy for a single person to plow many acres. The narrator continues to explain that the federal government has been working to salvage whatever land is left and restore it through New Deal initiatives including the Soil Conversation Service, Forest Service, and the Civilian Conservation Corps, while the Resettlement Administration worked to resettle the stranded farmers. The viewer is left with one last message from the narrator who warns that conservation is necessary in order to save the rest of the plains and that "another decade of reckless use, and the grasslands will truly be the great American desert."

== Production ==
=== Early production and filming ===
The early production period, which consisted of Pare Lorentz conducting research and developing a rough shooting script lasted from June to September 1935. To make the film as inexpensive as possible, Lorentz did not use any professional actors and shot all footage on location. Because sound technology was still new, bringing the equipment into the field to capture human voices and sounds would have been nearly impossible. Therefore, The Plow That Broke the Plains was initially a silent film with a musical score and narration added later. On September 3, Lorentz secured cameramen Ralph Steiner, Paul Strand, and Leo Hurwitz, each with experience in documentary film production and influenced by the work of Soviet filmmakers. Lorentz scouted locations for filming through examining and researching photos taken by the Resettlement Administration and began filming in September 1935 in Montana.

Over the next 7 weeks, Lorentz and his cameramen traversed eight states from the Montana-Wyoming border to the Texas Panhandle. Because The Plow That Broke the Plains was Lorentz's first film, he had difficulty communicating his ideas to the cameramen and filming locations became a point of contention between Lorentz and the crew. Additionally, the cameramen became concerned that the final script had not yet been written either. This resulted in Steiner, Strand, and Hurwitz creating their own script that voiced their own political positions that indicted capitalism, human greed, and a "lousy social system" for the devastation of the Great Plains and its residents. Following the Dust Storm sequences in Texas, Lorentz fired the crew and headed to California where Resettlement Administration photographer Dorothea Lange helped him capture scenes of migrants searching for work. Additionally Lorentz needed to finish the film with stock footage, but because the Hollywood community wanted to prevent the film from being completed as many considered it New Deal propaganda, they instructed studios and film libraries to refuse Lorentz's requests. Through friends, Lorentz was able to obtain the stock footage and complete the film after learning how to cut and edit the film himself, due to not having any budget to hire an editor.

=== Budget ===
The Resettlement Administration proposed to have The Plow That Broke the Plains produced and accompanied with music at an estimated expense of $6,000. Despite the budget allotted to film production, there were times that he worked without pay due to Congress debating whether or not the film should be created. Although Lorentz was salaried, he made only $18 a day, which was less than the cameramen working on the project. The film's final budget, however, end up at $19,260, three times the original budget. Because the initial budget ran out before the film's completion, Lorentz was forced to pay for the music, editing, and final printout from his own pocket. Upon completion, Lorentz went into Rexford Tugwell's office to submit his resignation.

=== Film techniques ===
In order to engage the audience, Lorentz had to condense the history of the Great Plains into a simplified "ecological drama" that would elicit a strong emotional response. Lorentz wrote the script following filming, with narration in a free verse that utilized a Walt Whitman-like repetition of words and phrases to create a mood of judgement. The expository commentary for the film consisted of only 700 words so as to not bombard the viewer with information and put more emphasis on picture technique and the musical score which Lorentz thought could speak louder than words.

== Soundtrack ==
=== Virgil Thomson and composition ===
Lorentz interviewed twelve composers and only Virgil Thomson agreed to work on the film following an offer of no more than $500 to write a music score. Thomson and Lorentz agreed that the film should be rendered through the folk music of the Plains people and produced 25 minutes of music in less than a week. After viewing the rough cut of the film, Thomson composed a score that was divided into six movements: Prelude, Pastorale (Grass), Cattle, Blues (Speculation), Drought, and Devastation. The soundtrack was a patchwork of dances, hymns, neo-medieval counterpoint, and chorale-like passages with wide-spaced harmonies, with interludes of familiar folk tunes like "Streets of Laredo" and "Git Along, Little Dogies". During the war sequence, Thomson accompanied the scene of the phalanx of tractors coming over a hill like a battalion of tanks on a battlefield with American troops marching to the song, "Mademoiselle from Armentieres." The final scene sequence's music is a tango which accompanies the narrator's call to action directed at the audience.

=== Recording ===
The New York Philharmonic recorded the musical score under the direction of conductor Alexander Smallens, while Metropolitan Opera baritone Thomas Chalmers recorded the narration. Thomson scored his accompaniment for a standard orchestra, plus saxophones, guitar, banjo, and harmonium. Because Lorentz had so little money left in his budget, on the day that the score was recorded he forced the session to stop at midnight because he could not afford to pay the New York Philharmonic members overtime. The musicians decided to complete the recording session for free. Following the completion of the final score, Lorentz re-cut sections of the film to accommodate the music.

== Reception ==
The Plow That Broke the Plains had its first showing at the White House in March 1936. After several private showings, the film was officially released to the public at the Mayflower Hotel on May 10, 1936. Following President Roosevelt's private showing, FDR praised Lorentz for his work and wanted to show it to a joint session of Congress. This would have made The Plow That Broke the Plains the first film to be screened in Congress, but this did not occur due to the House chambers not being equipped to show a film with sound. Although some film reviewers did not agree that The Plow That Broke the Plains was a pinnacle of artistic achievement, praise was almost unanimous and Lorentz became one of America's foremost directors.

Following the film's release, members of the Hollywood community claimed that due to the film being created by the government it was, therefore, a propaganda film and not a documentary. For this reason, they refused to show it in theaters. Lorentz traveled the country with the film to convince theater owners to show his film. The Rialto Theater in New York agreed and the public reacted positively. This led to other theater owners showing the film as well. Out of 14,000 commercial cinemas nationally, 3,000 screened the film to an audience of about 10 million in 1937. In addition to independent theaters the film was also shown in school auditoriums and public meeting places as well.

According to Robert L. Snyder's book about Lorentz, the filmmaker's favorite comment about the movie was something he heard an audience member say in the row ahead of him: "They never should have plowed them plains."

== Controversies ==
=== Distribution ===
Because government regulation forbade commercial theaters from charging admission to see the film, theater owners felt that the government was attempting to use them to distribute propaganda. Additionally, motion picture producers and theater owners felt that government-produced films might compete with their own products and threaten their profits, resulting in Hollywood barring the film from its distribution system. As an excuse to not show the film, commercial theaters argued that at 28-minutes long, the film was too short for a feature but too long for a newsreel.

=== Criticism ===
Further sources of controversy came from the film's interpretation of who was responsible for the ecological disaster of the Great Plains. While newsreels, journalists, and Great Plains politicians blamed the disasters on weather, Lorentz rejected this and instead pointed toward mechanized agriculture and human action as being the main culprits. Contemporary critics questioned Lorentz's understanding of the history of the Great Plains by pointing out how he emphasized agricultural expansion as the origin of the Dust Bowl and not the long droughts. Other critics have also explained that Lorentz had overlooked the diversity and vitality of the Great Plains economy and undervalued the quality of life of the farmers in order to build a case for converting substantial areas of the Great Plains back to grassland. Further critics also insisted that Lorentz had portrayed farmers as victims of modern technology and presented them with an unfair and negative image. Another critique of the film is that it also fails to mention the government's own role in the Dust Bowl disaster. Government settlement programs, land-use policies, and entrance into World War I pushed for an increase in agricultural production in the Great Plains are all state actions that critics have suggested contributed to the ecological problems in the Great Plains. The film only suggests that government intervention helped resolve the disaster, rather than that it also contributed to its cause.

=== Political controversy ===
Plains dwellers and politicians had a strong negative reaction to the release of The Plow That Broke the Plains. People from the region viewed it as a "great libel" against the Great Plains and accused the cameramen and Lorentz of selecting isolated spots to depict the entire region. This sentiment was felt particularly in the Dakotas, where residents and elected officials claimed the movie showed distortions and falsehoods. In the state capital of South Dakota, newspaper publisher J.B Hippie invited people to view the film in his Bijou theatre so that local residents could see how egregious the film was and be outraged at the portrayal of the Great Plains and its people. Because the scenes of the movie focused on the severely damaged counties in Texas and Oklahoma panhandles, Dakotans felt the film did not represent the whole plains region. Because the film did not make a distinction between the Great Plains regions, South Dakotans, in particular, feared that the film would deteriorate the state's image and discourage tourism, investors, and cause residents to flee. As a response to the film, South Dakotans created an illustrated pamphlet titled "The True Story of The Plow that Broke the Plains" which the Rural Credit Department distributed. The pamphlet's purpose was to display South Dakota's wealth and prosperity through modern tractors farming the plains, wheat fields, and herds of cattle. In 1939, the state legislature budgeted $10,000 to advertise the pamphlet across the state. Attorney and Republican state chairman Harlan Bushfield complained that The Plow That Broke the Plains the film "in one savage blow ruthlessly destroyed all the South Dakotans have built up in a generation." Some residents rejected the criticisms directed at the film and claimed the depictions to be true. One particular resident from Pennington County rebutted Bushfield's critique stating that he viewed everything through political eyeglasses and that "his eyesight is affected so much he can't tell a desert anymore when he sees one".

Further condemnation of the film came from the South Dakota Press Association, which petitioned its congressional delegation to get the film withdrawn from circulation due to the belief that it was misrepresenting and harming the state. Because South Dakotans felt that they were more knowledgeable about their own issues and that outsiders such as those involved in New Deal programs had ulterior motives, they rallied behind congressmen Karl Mundt. In Congress Mundt stated that the film was a "malicious and slanderous attempt to misrepresent the homeland of millions of thrifty people living west of the Mississippi River." Due to efforts from politicians like Mundt, the United States Film Service withdrew The Plow That Broke the Plains from US circulation on April 18, 1939, under the pretense that it would be revised to show the improved agricultural conditions. However, funds never were appropriated to have the planned revision, and The Plow That Broke the Plains was not made available to the public again until 1961. In Mundt's 1940 reelection campaign, he listed twenty reasons why he should be re-elected, his first point being that he had driven The Plow That Broke the Plains out of circulation.

== Significance ==
=== Legacy ===
The Resettlement Administration and its successor, the Farm Security Administration, and other government agencies distributed The Plow That Broke the Plains as an educational service. In addition to screenings in the U.S., the Plow That Broke the Plains was screened publicly in Canadian educational venues and film societies. At a conference on Canadian-American relations at Queen's University at Kingston in Ontario, The Plow That Broke the Plains screened as part of a program of films that highlighted problems of adapting to the North American Environment. Additionally The Plow That Broke the Plains inspired the Canadian film Heritage (1939). The Canadian Government Motion Picture Bureau produced this film for Canada's Department of Agriculture. While not a copy of The Plow That Broke the Plains, Heritage used The Plow That Broke the Plains as a model for how to produce a film particular to Canada's own problems in the Great Plains and to make a case for federal government programs. A U.S. government catalog of documentary film classics states that The Plow That Broke the Plains "has been one of the most widely praised and studied documentaries to be produced in America" and that its images "serve sort of visual shorthand which expressed a massive social problem on a more intimate and human scale." The Plow That Broke the Plains also generated discussion on the future of the Great Plains and brought up the question as to what extent the land of the Great Plains regions should be used for agriculture. Under the National Film Preservation Act The Plow That Broke the Plains was selected for preservation in 1999 as it was deemed to be "culturally, historically, or aesthetically" significant.

=== Political legacy ===
Following the success of The Plow That Broke the Plains and The River (1938), President Roosevelt became interested in how the government could use documentaries to communicate. Roosevelt attempted to continue the financing of the U.S. Film Service whose purpose was to "coordinate motion picture activities for the federal government, establish a national film library; set minimum standards for future government films, examine scripts for prospective films; give advice to other movie-making entities private or public, and to produce a small number of films in conjunction with other federal agencies". However, in response conservative Democrats and Republicans criticized the service for misusing Works Progress Administration funds and creating New Deal Propaganda. Due to Congress's wariness of funding a propaganda machine, it cut the U.S. Film Service budget and its work ended by June 30, 1940. Following the end of the U.S. Film Service, American film efforts were run solely by Hollywood. The Plow That Broke the Plains was also significant for prospective Democratic congressmen and senators who used the films content to promote their own platforms during their election campaigns.

=== Rereleases ===
Following its removal from circulation in 1939, The Plow That Broke the Plains was again available to the public in a 1962 release. In 2007 The Plow That Broke the Plains was re-released by Naxos. The 2007 DVD rerelease had a re-rendered soundtrack by Post-Classical Ensemble conducted by Angel Gil-Ordóñez in addition to new sound effects and a new narration by Floyd King. The DVD rerelease also included special features such as a short excerpt of a 1979 interview with Virgil Thomson in which he makes remarks on the creation of the original musical score, among other interviews regarding the creation of the original film.

== See also ==
- Pare Lorentz
- Virgil Thomson
- The River (1938)
- Farm Security Administration
- Rain follows the plow
