= The Rat Race (novel) =

1950 novel by John Franklin Carter

- Dust-jacket from the first edition
- Author: Jay Franklin
- Cover artist: Jack Gaughan
- Language: English
- Genre: Science fiction novel
- Publisher: Fantasy Publishing Company, Inc.
- Publication date: 1950
- Publication place: United States
- Media type: Print (hardback & paperback)
- Pages: 371
- OCLC: 1711283

The Rat Race is a science fiction novel by American writer Jay Franklin. It was published originally in the magazine Collier's Weekly in 1947. It was first published in book form in 1950 by Fantasy Publishing Company, Inc. with an edition of 1,500 copies of which 1,200 were hardcover.

== Plot summary ==
The novel concerns Lieutenant Commander Frank Jacklin who is killed by a thorium bomb explosion while on the battleship Alaska. He awakens in the body of Winnie Tompkins who had perpetrated the explosion. As Tompkins, he learns of a plot by German agents to poison Franklin D. Roosevelt and he tries to warn the authorities. He continues to become involved with intrigue until another accident restores Tompkins to his body, leaving Jacklin in the body of a dog.

== Sources ==
- Chalker, Jack L.; Mark Owings (1998). The Science-Fantasy Publishers: A Bibliographic History, 1923-1998. Westminster, MD and Baltimore: Mirage Press, Ltd. p. 270.
- Crawford, Jr., Joseph H.; James J. Donahue; Donald M. Grant (1953). "333", A Bibliography of the Science-Fantasy Novel. Providence, RI: The Grandon Company. p. 29. OCLC 3924496.
- Tuck, Donald H. (1974). The Encyclopedia of Science Fiction and Fantasy. Chicago: Advent. p. 94. ISBN 0-911682-20-1.
