= Floyd Crosby =

American cinematographer (1899–1985)

- Born: Floyd Delafield Crosby; December 12, 1899; West Philadelphia, Pennsylvania, United States
- Died: September 30, 1985 (aged 85); Ojai, California, United States
- Occupation: Cinematographer
- Spouse: Aliph Van Cortlandt Whitehead (m. 1930; div. 1960) Betty Cormack Andrews (m. 1960)
- Children: 2, including David Crosby
- Relatives: Francis Delafield; (grandfather); Edward Henry Delafield; (uncle)

Floyd Delafield Crosby, ASC (December 12, 1899 – September 30, 1985) was an American cinematographer. He won the Academy Award for Best Cinematography in 1931 for Tabu: A Story of the South Seas, his debut film, before going on to shoot over 120 productions in a career spanning over 40 years. Beginning in the 1950s, he was the regular cinematographer for Roger Corman, totaling 21 films together. He also worked with directors like Fred Zinnemann, John Sturges, and Buzz Kulik.

Crosby was the father of singer-songwriter David Crosby.

== Early life ==
Floyd Delafield Crosby was born and raised in West Philadelphia, the son of Julia Floyd (née Delafield) and Frederick Van Schoonhoven Crosby. Through his maternal grandmother, he was descended from the prominent Van Rensselaer family. His maternal grandfather was Dr. Francis Delafield. His maternal uncle was Edward Henry Delafield (1880–1955).

Crosby worked at the New York Stock Exchange, before enrolling in the New York Institute of Photography.

== Career ==
In 1927, he was hired by marine biologist William Beebe as a cameraman for his expedition to Haiti. The expedition would establish Crosby as a top documentary cameraman, befriending Robert J. Flaherty. In 1929, Flaherty hired Crosby to shoot the ethnographic film Tabu: A Story of the South Seas, directed by F. W. Murnau. It was Crosby's first photography credit on a feature film, and earned him Best Cinematography at the 4th Academy Awards.

Crosby subsequently filmed the Bedaux expedition in 1934, and shot other documentaries for the likes of Pare Lorentz and Joris Ivens. He served as a cinematographer for the U.S. Army Air Corps film wing, and made flight training films in World War II. He left the Air Corps in 1946. His disinterest in studio politics dissuaded him from working on traditional feature films, and he remained a somewhat fringe figure until 1951, when Robert Rossen hired him to shoot The Brave Bulls. The following year, he shot High Noon (1952) for director Fred Zinnemann, which went on to win four Academy Awards. Crosby won a Golden Globe Award for Best Cinematography (Black-and-White).

In the following years, Crosby worked primarily with B-movie director Roger Corman. Beginning with Five Guns West (1955), the two worked on a total of 21 films between 1955 and 1967. Crosby also shot many other films for Corman's American International Pictures. Some sources claimed Crosby was relegated to working on B-movies because he had been blacklisted, though Corman denied this, stating Crosby's simply disliked traditional studio politics.

In 1973, he participated in an oral history sponsored by the American Film Institute, part of which dealt with his work on Tabu: A Story of the South Seas.

== Personal life and death ==
On December 11, 1930, he married Aliph Van Cortlandt Whitehead. She was the daughter of John Brinton Whitehead. Together, they had two children:

- Ethan Crosby (1937–1997), a reclusive singer-songwriter
- David Crosby (1941–2023), a member of the Byrds and Crosby, Stills, Nash & Young

Crosby divorced in 1960 and married Betty Cormack Andrews in the same year.

He retired in 1972 to Ojai, California, where he died at the age of 85 in 1985.

== Selected filmography ==
- Tabu: A Story of the South Seas (1931)
- Mato Grosso: the Great Brazilian Wilderness (1931)
- The Plow That Broke the Plains (1936)
- The River (1937)
- The Fight for Life (1940)
- Power and the Land (1940)
- It's All True
- The Land (1942)
- Traffic with the Devil (1946)
- My Father's House (1947)
- Of Men and Music (1950)
- The Brave Bulls (1951)
- Devil Take Us (1952)
- High Noon (1952)
- The Steel Lady (1953)
- Five Guns West (1954)
- Naked Paradise (1956)
- Attack of the Crab Monsters (1956)
- Rock All Night (1956)
- She Gods of Shark Reef (1957)
- The Old Man and the Sea (1958)
- The Screaming Skull (1958)
- War of the Satellites (1958)
- Machine-Gun Kelly (1958)
- I Mobster (1958)
- The Cry Baby Killer (1958)
- The Wonderful Country (1959)
- Crime and Punishment U.S.A. (1959)
- Freckles (1960)
- House of Usher (1960)
- The Explosive Generation (1960)
- The Pit and the Pendulum (1961)
- A Cold Wind in August (1961)
- The Premature Burial (1962)
- Tales of Terror (1962)
- Hand of Death (1962)
- The Young Racers (1963)
- The Raven (1963)
- The Yellow Canary (1963)
- X: The Man with the X-ray Eyes (1963)
- Black Zoo (1963)
- The Haunted Palace (1963)
- Sallah Shabati (1964)
- The Comedy of Terrors (1964)
- Pajama Party (1964)
- Indian Paint (1965)
- Fireball 500 (1966)
- The Cool Ones (1967)
