= The Fight for Life =

- Directed by: Pare Lorentz
- Screenplay by: Pare Lorentz; John Steinbeck (uncredited)
- Story by: Paul de Kruif
- Produced by: Pare Lorentz; Tommy Atkins (associate producer); Elizabeth Meyer (associate producer)
- Starring: Myron McCormick; Storrs Haynes; Will Geer; Dudley Digges; Dorothy Adams
- Cinematography: Floyd Crosby
- Music by: Louis Gruenberg
- Production company: United States Film Service
- Distributed by: Columbia Pictures
- Release date: March 7, 1940
- Running time: 69 minutes
- Country: United States
- Language: English
- Budget: $150,000
- Box office: n/a

The Fight for Life is a 1940 American medical drama film directed by Pare Lorentz. The film was nominated for the Best Original Score of a Picture composed by Louis Gruenberg and released by Columbia Pictures.

An uncredited John Steinbeck wrote the narrative portions of the film.

== Plot ==
At the City Hospital a young intern witnesses the death of a young mother in a maternity hospital delivery room. Very worried about having overlooked a fact that could have prevented death, he began to frequent a maternity clinic in a poor neighborhood of Chicago to learn more about maternity mortality and find new ways to avoid it.

== Cast ==
- Myron McCormick (The young intern)
- Storrs Haynes (The teacher)
- Will Geer (2nd Teacher)
- Dudley Digges (Head Doctor)
- Dorothy Adams (The Young Woman)
- Effie Anderson (The Receptionist)
