= The River (1938 film) =

1938 documentary film directed by Pare Lorentz

- Theatrical release poster
- Directed by: Pare Lorentz
- Written by: Pare Lorentz
- Cinematography: Floyd Crosby; Willard Van Dyke; Stacy Woodard
- Distributed by: Farm Security Administration
- Release date: February 4, 1938
- Running time: 31 minutes
- Country: United States
- Language: English

The River is a 1938 short documentary film written and directed by Pare Lorentz.

== Synopsis ==
The film shows the importance of the Mississippi River to the United States, and how farming and timber practices had caused topsoil to be swept down the river and into the Gulf of Mexico, leading to catastrophic floods and impoverishing farmers. It ends by briefly describing how the Tennessee Valley Authority project was beginning to reverse these problems.

== Production ==
The two films were sponsored by the U.S. government and specifically the Resettlement Administration (RA) to raise awareness about the New Deal. The RA was folded into the Farm Security Administration in 1937, so The River was officially an FSA production.

There is also a companion book, The River. The text was nominated for the Pulitzer Prize in poetry in that year.

== Soundtrack ==
Both films have notable scores by Virgil Thomson that are still heard as concert suites, featuring an adaptation of the hymn "How Firm a Foundation". The film was narrated by the American baritone Thomas Hardie Chalmers. Thomson's score was heavily adapted from his own concert work Symphony on a Hymn Tune. The River later served as the score for the 1983 TV movie The Day After.

== Legacy ==
Like Lorentz's earlier 1936 documentary The Plow That Broke the Plains, was selected for preservation in the United States National Film Registry by the Library of Congress as being "culturally, historically, or aesthetically significant", going into the registry in 1990.

== See also ==
- The Plow That Broke the Plains
- Farm Security Administration
