= The Scarecrow (play) =

1908 play by Percy MacKaye

The Scarecrow is a play written by Percy MacKaye in 1908, and first presented on Broadway in 1911. It is based on Nathaniel Hawthorne's short story, "Feathertop", but greatly expands upon the tale. Mackaye himself stated that he hoped that the play would not be taken as a dramatization of "Feathertop", since the intentions of the two works are so different: "The scarecrow Feathertop is ridiculous, as the emblem of a superficial fop; the scarecrow Ravensbane is pitiful, as the emblem of human bathos."

== Productions ==
The Scarecrow (full 1972 television film)

Frank Reicher, known to modern audiences for playing the ship's captain in the original King Kong and its sequel Son of Kong, starred in the title role in the original 1911 Broadway production. The play had what would now be considered an extremely short run in New York (23 performances). In 1923 it was filmed as a silent movie, Puritan Passions, starring Mary Astor. The play was revived twice in New York (most recently in 2005), has been made into an opera, and has become a favorite in regional theatre in the United States. A 1972 television production, first telecast on PBS, is now available on DVD. It stars Gene Wilder, Blythe Danner, Pete Duel, Norman Lloyd, and Will Geer.

"Feathertop", the Nathaniel Hawthorne story on which the play is based, has been presented in two television productions - one of them an adaptation on the General Electric Theater starring Natalie Wood and Carleton Carpenter, the other a musical starring Hugh O'Brian in the title role and Jane Powell as Julie Balfour (rather than Rachel). It has also been made as a silent film twice.

The play was also adapted into an animated feature in 2000, directed by Brian Nissen and Richard Rich, which bore almost no resemblance to the original play.

== Plot ==
The play takes place in seventeenth-century Massachusetts. It is in four acts. Years ago, Justice Gilead Merton deserted his mistress Goody Rickby after she gave birth to a son. The child later died because Goody was unable to obtain medical help for him. In the years following, Goody has learned witchcraft from Dickon, the Devil himself. To avenge herself on Merton, she and Dickon manufacture a scarecrow, bring it to life so that it resembles a human, and take him to Merton's house, with the intention of having the Scarecrow seduce Merton's niece, Rachel, away from her fiancé just before their wedding. The Scarecrow is introduced into society as Lord Ravensbane, with Dickon as his tutor. Ravensbane seems to enjoy smoking a corncob pipe, but the truth is that the pipe actually keeps him alive. Unfortunately for Goody and Dickon's sinister plan, the Scarecrow soon develops kind-hearted feelings of his own. His true identity is revealed at a party, when his reflection in the Mirror of Truth, which Rachel has bought from Goody, reveals a scarecrow, rather than a man. The other guests panic and flee, all except Rachel and her fiancé Richard Talbot, who are the only ones that return. The Scarecrow, horrified, and finally realizing the true meaning of his "mission", breaks his corncob pipe and collapses, only to momentarily revive and see in the mirror that his sacrifice for Rachel has transformed him into a real human being. With a look of wonder and happiness on his face, he falls back dead. When Talbot examines him and says, "He's dead", Rachel triumphantly, yet sadly, answers, "But - a man!" The curtain falls.

The play's language is a sort of cross between seventeenth-century and what was considered modern English in 1908.

== Copyright ==
The copyright for this play has expired in the United States and, thus, now resides in the public domain. The Internet Archive contains scans in various formats at The scarecrow; or, The glass of truth; a tragedy of the ludicrous (c1908).
