= Pare Lorentz =

American filmmaker known for his New Deal-era work

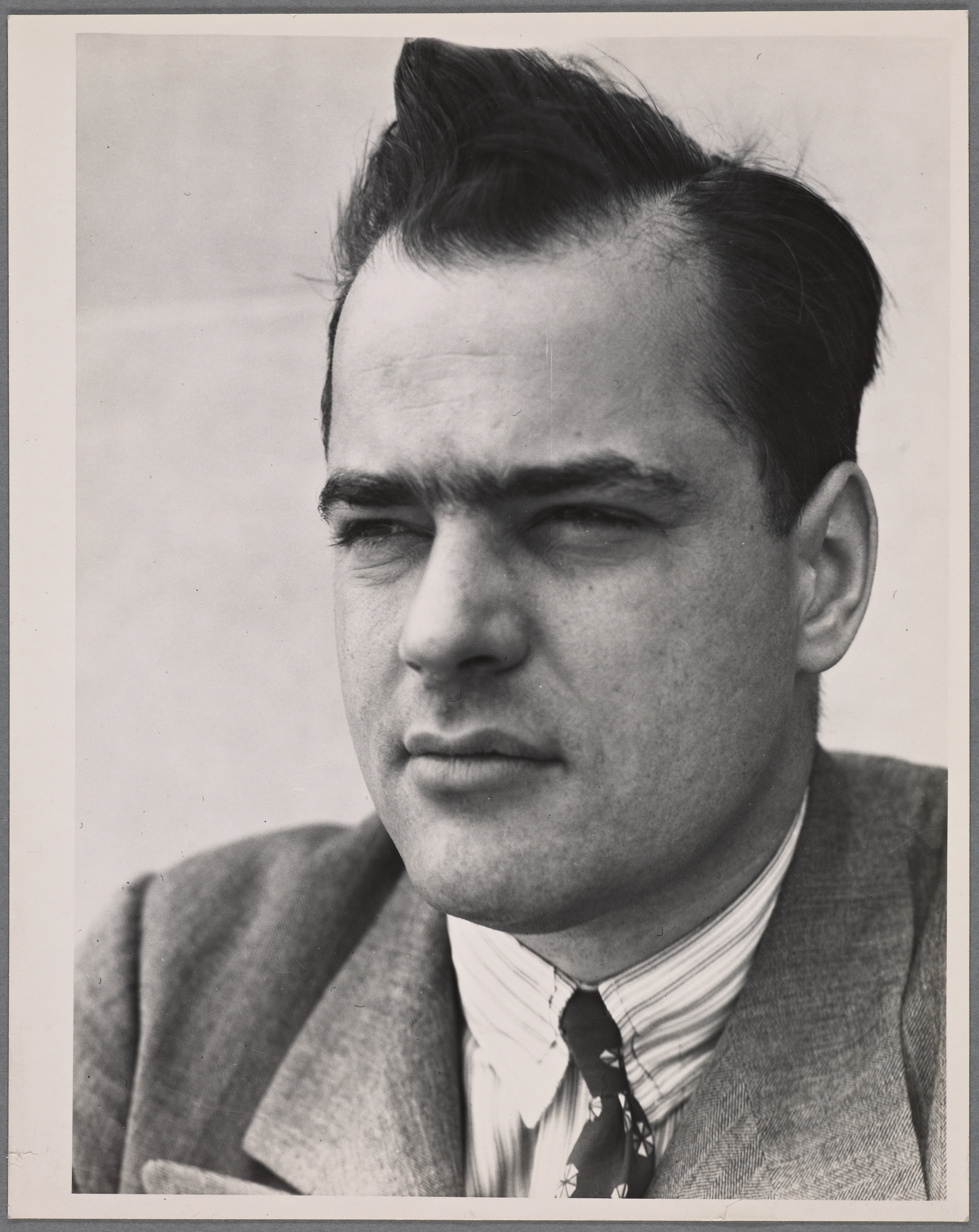
- Pare Lorentz, 1935—1942
- Born: Leonard MacTaggart Lorentz; December 11, 1905; Clarksburg, West Virginia, United States
- Died: March 4, 1992 (aged 86); Armonk, New York
- Education: West Virginia Wesleyan College; West Virginia University
- Occupations: Filmmaker and critic
- Employer: Resettlement Administration
- Organization(s): WWII U.S. Army Air Corps, Colonel
- Known for: Documentaries: New Deal; Dust Bowl; Nuremberg trials; U.S. Office of War Information
- Movement: New Deal
- Spouses: Sally Bates (m. 1931; divorced before 1943); Elizabeth Meyer (m. 1943; Lorentz's death 1992)
- Children: Pare Lorentz, Jr.; Matilda Lorentz Grey; (both with Sally Bates)
- Parents: Pare Hanson Lorentz; Alma MacTaggart Ruttencutter
- Awards: Best Documentary, Venice International Film Festival; Pare Lorentz Film Festival of the International Documentary Association, named in his honor

Pare Lorentz (December 11, 1905 – March 4, 1992) was an American filmmaker known for his film work about the New Deal. Born Leonard MacTaggart Lorentz in Clarksburg, West Virginia he was educated at Buckhannon High School, West Virginia Wesleyan College, and West Virginia University. As a young film critic in both New York City and Hollywood, Lorentz spoke out against censorship in the film industry.

As the documentary filmmaker of the Great Depression, Lorentz was the American advocate for government-sponsored documentary films. His service as a filmmaker for the U.S. Army Air Corps during World War II, including technical films, documentation of bombing raids, and synthesizing raw footage of Nazi atrocities for an educational film on the Nuremberg Trials. Nonetheless, Lorentz perennially will be known best as "FDR′s filmmaker."

== New Deal documentary films ==
Lorentz left West Virginia University, in 1925, to begin a career as a writer and film critic in New York City. He contributed articles to leading magazines such as Scribner's, Vanity Fair, McCall's, and Town and Country.

Lorentz also co-authored a 1929 book, Censored: the private life of the movie.

His work as a film critic led him to Hollywood, where he wrote several articles on censorship and The Roosevelt Year: 1933, a pictorial review of the first year of Franklin D. Roosevelt′s presidency. Roosevelt was impressed with the articles and the book, and in 1936, as president of the United States, invited Lorentz to make a government-sponsored film about the Oklahoma Dust Bowl.

Despite not having any film credits, Lorentz was appointed to the Resettlement Administration as a film consultant. He was given US$6,000 to make a film, which became The Plow That Broke the Plains, a film that showed the natural and man–made devastation caused by the Dust Bowl. Though the tight budget and his inexperience occasionally showed through in the film, Lorentz's script, combined with Thomas Hardie Chalmers′s narration and Virgil Thomson′s score, made the 30-minute movie powerful and moving. The film, which had its first public showing on May 10, 1936 at Washington, D.C′s Mayflower Hotel, had a preview screening in March at the White House. Roosevelt was impressed and, after his re-election in 1936, gave Lorentz the opportunity to make a film about one of the president's favorite subjects: conservation. Lorentz made The River, a film celebrating the exploits of the Tennessee Valley Authority.

The TVA mitigated flooding but, more importantly to Lorentz and to Roosevelt, it put a stop to the prodigious pillaging of the forests by providing cheap, readily available hydro–electric power to a wide area. This film won the Best Documentary at the Venice International Film Festival. The text of The River appeared in book form, and was nominated for the Pulitzer Prize in poetry the same year. It generally is considered his most masterful work.

When Republicans gained seats in Congress in 1938, and the congressional balance of power shifted in a more conservative direction, the pipeline of federal commissions for projects like Lorentz's were halted along with the short-lived existence of the US Film Service, which Lorentz headed. In 1940, he produced Power and the Land promoting the Rural Electric Administration. The REA took over its own production, and the film was directed by Joris Ivens, the prolific Dutch filmmaker best known for his anti–fascist documentaries.

Before the U.S. involvement in World War II, Lorentz made The Fight for Life (1940), a semi-documentary on the struggle to provide adequate natal (obstetric) care at the Chicago Maternity Center, based on a book by Paul de Kruif. John Steinbeck worked on the project with Lorentz.

He made a film for RKO Name, Age and Occupation that was never completed.

== U.S. Army Air Corps World War II films ==
Lorentz served in the U.S. Army Air Corps, more specifically the Air Transport Command (ATC), accompanied by Floyd Crosby, who became an outstanding cinematographer during World War II. He was promoted to the rank of colonel. While serving, he made 275 pilot navigational films and minor documentaries for the U.S. Office of War Information (OWI) and the U.S. Information Agency (USIA), and filmed over 2,500 hours of bombing raids. (Note: Lorentz's name is not associated with any OWI or USIA films; his son Pare Lorentz, Jr., may have worked on a USIA film though most of his work was for USAID.) In 1946, Lorentz made a federally funded movie about the Nuremberg trials, intended to help educate the German people as to what had happened during the war. In the process of compiling material, Lorentz reviewed over 1 million hours of footage about the Nazis and their atrocities. Nuremberg, the film that resulted, played to "capacity audiences" in Germany for two years. However, it was not released in the United States until 1979. This film was produced for the Civil Affairs Division of the Government of Military Occupation (OMGUS). Lorentz's role and contributions to this production are not entirely clear because he prematurely resigned and the Hollywood director Budd Schulberg is given credit for completing it.

== Later life and legacy ==
In the prosperity of the post–War period, there was no revival of partnerships with the federal government. He had ambitious plans to make documentaries about the New Deal and the United Nations, but funding was not available from government or private sources. His final film was Rural Co-op, which he wrote and directed in 1947.

Lorentz lived a quiet life among the country gentry 37 miles (59.55 kilometres) north of New York City in the upscale town of Armonk, New York until his death in 1992.

The International Documentary Association named its Pare Lorentz Documentary Fund, as well as the Pare Lorentz Film Festival and its grand prize in honor of Lorentz, granted to individuals whose work best represents the "democratic sensibility, activist spirit and lyrical vision" of Lorentz."

== Selected filmography ==
Film poster for The River

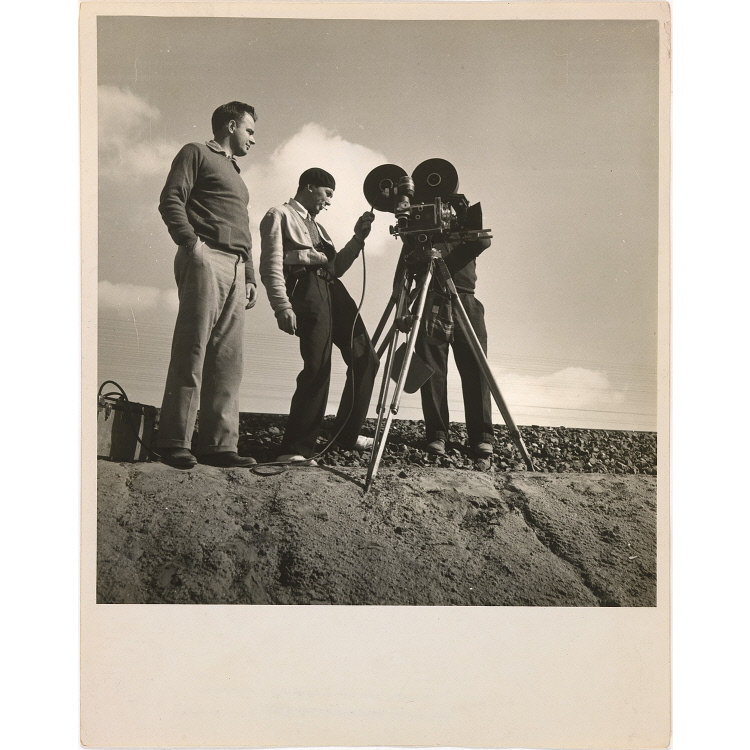
Pare Lorentz & cinematographer Paul Ivano making The Plow That Broke the Plains, near Bakersfield, Calif.

- The Roosevelt Year (1933)
- The Plow That Broke the Plains (1936)
- The River (1938)
- The Fight for Life (1940)
- Nuremberg (1946)
- Rural Co-op (1947)

The Library of Congress has made available on its website a full-length version of The River, open for public viewing at the print's digital ID of hdl.loc.gov/loc.mbrsmi/ntscrm.00101008. This is a theatrical projection print acquired as part of the library's preservation program for films which were honored by being selected for listing on the National Film Registry. The following XML page contains the print's metadata as a Dublin Core record: lccn.loc.gov/2007640253/dc.

The Pare Lorentz Center, located at the Franklin D. Roosevelt Presidential Library in Hyde Park, New York, but with its separate online presence, has links on its website to three films which were posted to YouTube by the FDR Library's account:

- The aforementioned film (but a different print) The River – part of the FDR Library's description reads, "The script for the film was nominated for a Pulitzer Prize for poetry and was also described by author James Joyce as ‘the most beautiful prose I have heard in ten years’.”
- The Plow That Broke the Plains
- The Fight for Life Part 1 – a historical recording from the National Archives at College Park

== Publications ==
- Lorentz, Pare (1992). FDR's movie maker : memoirs and scripts. Reno, Nev.: University of Nevada Press. p. 41. ISBN 978-0-87417-186-0. LCCN 91038493. OCLC 910219456. OL 1557742M – via Google Books.
- Ernst, Morris Leopold; Lorentz, Pare (1970) [1st pub. 1929]. Censored: the private life of the movie. New York: J. Cape and H. Smith. hdl:2027/mdp.39015011025742. OCLC 446645561 – via HathiTrust.
- Lorentz, Pare (1975). Lorentz on film: movies 1927 to 1941. New York: Hopkinson and Blake. ISBN 978-0-911974-10-2.
- Lorentz, Pare (2014) [1st pub. 1938]. The River. New York: Nabu Press. ISBN 978-1-293501-03-0. "Stackpole Sons, 1st pub."
- Lorentz, Pare (1934). The Roosevelt year: a photographic record. Literary digest books. New York and London: Funk & Wagnalls Company. OCLC 974368.

== See also ==
- Film censorship in the United States
