= Home Movie Day =

Home Movie Day (established 2002) is an annual event that celebrates amateur films and filmmaking. It is a worldwide event, held at local venues all over the world and organized locally by volunteers. Home Movie Day events provide the opportunity for individuals and families to have their films inspected and to see and share their own home movies with an audience of their community. The event is an opportunity to discover the personal, historical, and social importance of home movies and for individuals to learn how to best care for them.

From 2003 to 2007, Home Movie Day was usually held on the second Saturday of August. The first Home Movie Day was held August 16, 2003 (8/16), a play on the respective film gauges. In 2008 the official day was moved to the third Saturday of October. The 2020 date is Saturday, October 17.

Three films first publicly screened at Home Movie Day events were subsequently named to the Library of Congress's National Film Registry. Think of Me First as a Person, an amateur documentary about a boy with Down syndrome, was shown at the New Orleans event in August 2006 and added to the National Film Registry in December 2006. Our Day, a 1938 amateur film about the day in the life of a Kentucky family shot by Wallace Kelly of Lebanon, Kentucky was first screened at the August 2007 New York City Home Movie Day held at Anthology Film Archives, and named to the Registry in December 2007. "Disneyland Dream", a 1956 amateur film about the Robbins Barstow family of Wethersfield, Connecticut, winning a free trip to newly opened Disneyland theme park in Anaheim, California, in a nationwide contest, was shown at the August 2006 Home Movie Day in New Haven, Connecticut, and was named to the National Film Registry in December 2008.

The founders of Home Movie Day established The Center for Home Movies in 2005 as a non-profit organization to administer Home Movie Day and other home movie and amateur film preservation projects.

A tagline for Home Movie Day is "Don't let your films decay! Take them to Home Movie Day!"
