= Indiana University Libraries Moving Image Archive =

Film repository in Bloomington, Indiana

The Indiana University Libraries Moving Image Archive (IULMIA) is a major repository for nontheatrical film, video, and related archival materials located in Bloomington, Indiana.

== History ==
Founded in 2009, the archive's initial holdings consisted of over 100,000 educational, documentary, and other unique films that were either created or distributed by Indiana University. Many of these were acquired from the Indiana University Audio-Visual Center, which rented the films and videos out across the United States for the latter half of the 20th century until its closure in 2006.

As of 2012, the Moving Image Archive was accepted as a member of the International Federation of Film Archives.

In 2016, a dedicated space was opened on the ground floor of Herman B. Wells Library for Media Services, the Moving Image Archive, and the Black Film Collection and Archives. A screening room opened adjacent to the Moving Image Archive in 2017 capable of high-quality film and video screenings for university classes and members of the general public.

== Collections ==
The Moving Image Archive holds a wide variety of audiovisual materials spanning over 80 years of audiovisual history. As of 2017, its holdings were estimated at over 120,000 items, making it one of the largest and most comprehensive collections currently held by an academic library in the United States. The archive has collaborated with numerous agencies worldwide, including the Library of Congress and Visible Evidence, the international conference on documentary film and media.

=== Alan Lewis Small Gauge Camera and Projector Collection ===
In 2017, film archivist Alan Lewis donated his collection of approximately 200 small gauge cameras and 50 projectors to the Moving Image Archive. The dates on the equipment range from World War II-era machines to cameras and projectors used throughout the second half of the 20th century. Manufacturers featured include Bell & Howell, Kodak, Bolex, Wittnauer, Canon, and Yashica.

=== Clio Awards Collection ===
In 2017, the archive acquired the Clio Awards Collection from the London International Awards, the organization that purchased the collection from its creator, the Clio Awards, in 1992. The collection contains thousands of reels of 16mm and 35mm film, with entries and winners from the Clio Awards from the 1960s through the 1990s across a wide array of categories. International submissions are also included in the collection.

=== Educational Film Collection ===
Part of the Moving Image Archive's initial holdings, the Educational Film Collection was created before World War II as an outreach service provided by the Indiana University Extension Office. In 1945, its holdings consisted of almost 500 films that were distributed to various organizations - schools, public libraries, clubs and organizations - across the United States for low rates.

Throughout the 20th century, the Educational Film Collection continued to grow. Under the management of the Indiana University Audio-Visual Center, it expanded to include videocassettes (U-Matic and 1/2" VHS) in the 1970s.

Upon its acquisition by the Indiana University Library System in 2006, the collection contained approximately 50,000 reels of 16mm film and 7,000 videos, including around 1,000 films that were produced by the Indiana University Audio-Visual Center's staff.

=== Edward and Naomi Feil Collection ===
In 2016, the archive acquired the Edward and Naomi Feil Collection. The collection contains the life's work of husband and wife filmmakers Edward and Naomi Feil, whose 1968 film The Inner World of Aphasia was added to the National Film Registry in 2015. In addition to production elements from their films, the collection contains many of their home movies showing their travels to various destinations around the world in the latter half of the 20th century.
