= Mabel Kelly =

Mabel Kelly may refer to:

- "Mabel Kelly", song by Turlough O'Carolan
- "Mabel Kelly", poem by Austin Clarke in Flights to Africa
- Mabel Kelly (actress), American actress who appeared in films such as Oscar Micheaux's Thirty Years Later
- Mabel Kelly, née Graham, wife of Wallace Kelly and actress in his films such as Our Day
- "Mabel Kelly", song by Joemy Wilson
