= Preservation of the Sign Language =

- Directed by: George Veditz
- Starring: George Veditz
- Production company: National Association of the Deaf
- Release date: 1913
- Running time: 14 minutes
- Country: United States
- Language: American Sign Language

Preservation of the Sign Language is a fourteen-minute film, presented without subtitles, featuring George Veditz, onetime president of the National Association of the Deaf (NAD) of the United States, demonstrating in sign language the importance of defending the right of deaf people to sign as opposed to verbalizing their communication. Deafened by scarlet fever at the age of eight, Veditz was one of the first to make motion-picture recordings of American Sign Language. Taking care to sign precisely and in large gestures for the cameras, Veditz chose fiery biblical passages to give his speech emotional impact. In some of his films, Veditz used finger spelling so his gestures could be translated directly into English in venues where interpreters were present. On behalf of the NAD, Veditz made this film specifically to record sign language for posterity at a time when oralists (those who promoted lip reading and speech in lieu of sign language) were gaining momentum in the education of the deaf. The film conveys one of the ways that deaf Americans debated the issues of their language and public understanding during the era of World War I.

In 2010, the film was selected for preservation in the National Film Registry by the Library of Congress.
