= 13 Lakes =

2004 American film by James Benning

- A screenshot from the film
- Directed by: James Benning
- Produced by: James Benning
- Cinematography: James Benning
- Distributed by: Canyon Cinema
- Release date: October 20, 2004 (Vienna International Film Festival)
- Running time: 133 minutes (Note: Sources variously give 133 or 135 minutes for the running time of the film.)
- Country: United States
- Languages: Silent; English credits

13 Lakes is a 2004 American experimental film by independent filmmaker James Benning. Consisting of 13 ten-minute-long static shots of different lakes in the United States, 13 Lakes is an instance of slow cinema, placing emphasis on introspection and contemplation. Shot on 16 mm film, 13 Lakes had its world premiere at the Vienna International Film Festival on October 20, 2004. Due to the experimental nature of the film, it did not receive a theatrical release, but has been distributed by Canyon Cinema. 13 Lakes received positive reviews, with particular praise directed towards its ambience, cinematography and Benning's direction. In 2014, it was deemed "culturally, historically, or aesthetically significant" by the Library of Congress and selected for preservation in the United States National Film Registry.

== Overview ==
13 Lakes consists of 13 ten-minute-long static shots of different lakes in the United States. The surface of the lakes bisect the skyline. Each transition to a new shot is separated by several seconds of darkness. In order of appearance, the lakes featured are Jackson Lake in Wyoming; Moosehead Lake, Maine; the Salton Sea, California; Lake Superior, Minnesota; Lake Winnebago, Wisconsin; Lake Okeechobee, Florida; Red Lake, Minnesota; Lake Pontchartrain, Louisiana; the Great Salt Lake, Utah; Lake Iliamna, Alaska; Lake Powell in both Utah and Arizona; Crater Lake, Oregon; and Oneida Lake, New York.

=== Synopsis ===
The sky is clear above Jackson Lake; the sun rises during the scene. Mountains are seen in the distance. Bird vocalization and howling—likely that of a gray wolf—can be heard prominently for the first two minutes of the shot. The daylight sky above Moosehead Lake is cloudy. The horizon separates two landmasses visible to the left and rightmost sides of the scene. The daylight sky above Salton Sea is clear and sunny. For the entire duration of the scene, with mountains visible in the distance, two jet skis circle the body of water. It is a cloudy day over Lake Superior, which sees a harbor in the distance. Chunks of ice float in the lake. A container ship enters the harbor sailing from the right to left side of the shot. The sky above Lake Winnebago is clear. Land is seen in the far distance and bird vocalization is heard, which gradually increases throughout the duration of the scene. In the far distance, a sailing ship enters the scene from the left and disappears from view as it nears the center of the shot. It is a sunny day over Lake Okeechobee, although clouds are seen in the distance which slowly approach the shot. Flora—possibly seagrass—is seen emerging from the water, as are rocks, with forested wetland visible in the near distance. A level crossing is heard, followed by a train horn and train noise as a train passes behind the shot.

The sky above Red Lake is cloudy. The only landmass visible is in the far distance to the rightmost side of the shot. Thunder is heard throughout the scene as rain clouds emerge from the right side of the shot and float leftwards. The sky above Lake Pontchartrain is also cloudy. Visible is the Lake Pontchartrain Causeway, disappearing in the distance as it heads left. It is a clear day over Great Salt Lake, although clouds are seen in the distance. Mountainous terrain is visible at the center of the lake. Birds circle the area at the start of the shot, after which they can be seen in the distance flying across the lake. Two planes are heard flying overhead. Lake Iliamna is cloudy, with mist visible across the lake. In the distance, snowy mountains rise up along the horizon, towering above the lake. It is a clear day over Lake Powell as the sun is setting. The shot, encircled by the Colorado Plateau, becomes gradually encompassed in darkness. A plane can be heard, and later a small passenger ship sails from the right to the left of the shot. Crater Lake is perfectly reflected in the clear water on a clear day, though several clouds do pass by. Several gunshots are heard throughout the duration of the scene, which echo around the lake. It is a cloudy day over Oneida Lake, with the only visible land located to the left of the shot.

== Production ==
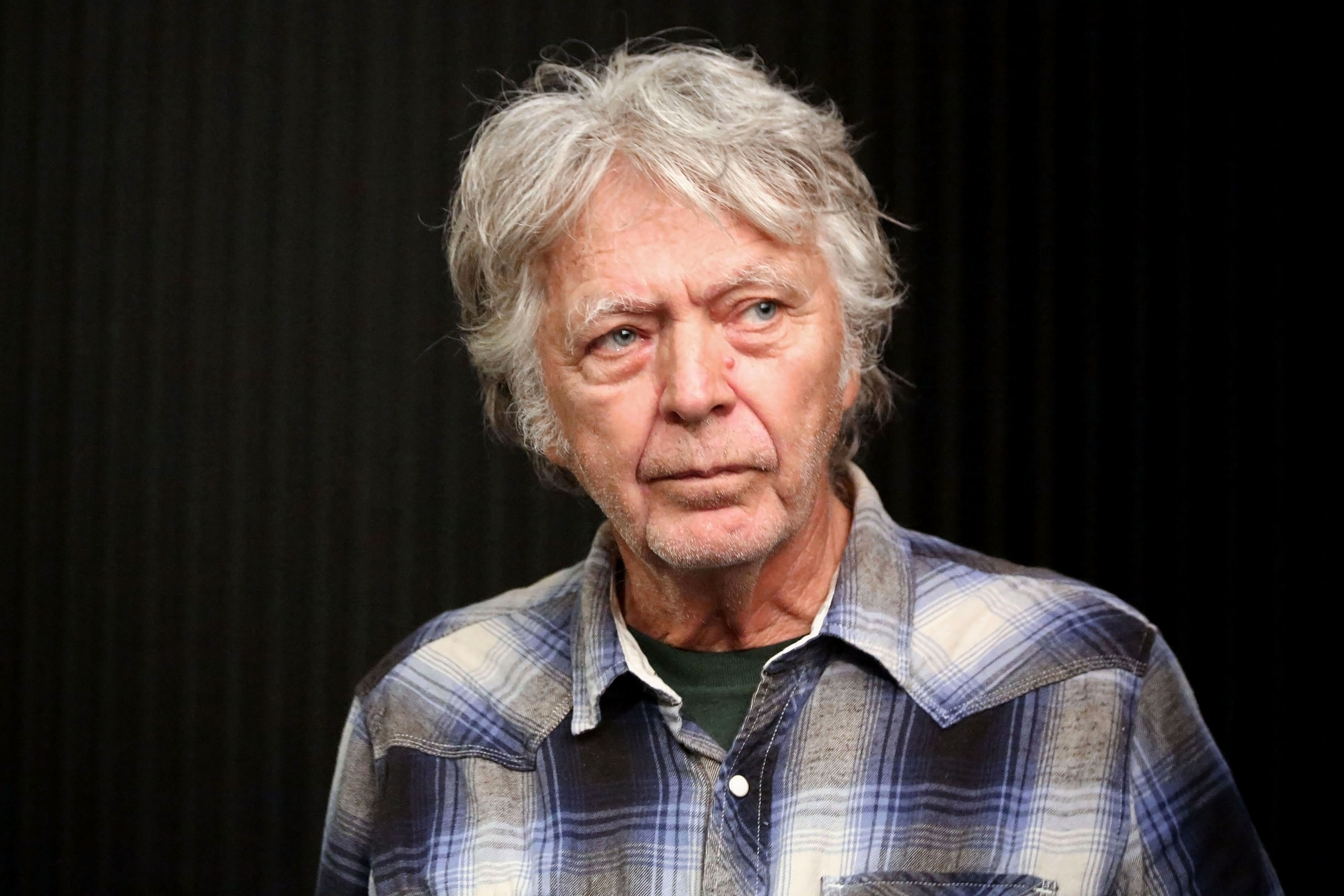
Benning in 2012

James Benning is an American independent filmmaker known for utilizing long takes in his films. Benning's The United States of America (1975) was described by the Criterion Channel as "one of the major works of the structuralist film movement of the 1970s." Many of Benning's works focus heavily on landscape. His films have been described as an example of slow cinema, a genre of art cinema that is characterized by a style that is minimalist, observational, and with little or no narrative, and emphasis on long takes. Scott MacDonald, writing in an essay for the National Film Registry, notes Benning's previous films 11 x 14 (1977) and One Way Boogie Woogie (1977) which both prominently incorporate landscape. MacDonald regards 13 Lakes as the culmination of Benning's gradually increasing interest in testing the patience of the audience. According to Andrew Chan of Slant Magazine, Benning was aiming to replicate the "experience of perceiving", and aimed for 13 Lakes to have a more austere tone than any of his previous films.

MacDonald believes that Benning specifically chose the thirteen lakes because of his personal history with each of them. For instance, Oneida Lake was chosen due to his frequent visits with friends residing in central New York, and Benning is fond of both the Salton Sea and the Great Salt Lake. Benning purposefully chose to bisect the lakes with the skyline as he considered the sky to add atmosphere and contribute to each lake's uniqueness. Nikolaj Lübecker and Daniele Rugo notice a similarity between the title of 13 Lakes and the works of painter and photographer Edward Ruscha—citing Twentysix Gasoline Stations (1963), Thirtyfour Parking Lots (1967) and Nine Swimming Pools and a Broken Glass (1968) as examples. 13 Lakes is the longest of Benning's films to be shot on 16 mm. Benning has since moved to digital film, which allows his works to be even longer. 13 Lakes was shot and released alongside another film by Benning entitled Ten Skies.

== Release and reception ==
13 Lakes had its world premiere at the Vienna International Film Festival (Viennale) on October 20, 2004. Due to the experimental nature of the film, it did not receive a theatrical release, but has been distributed by Canyon Cinema. 13 Lakes received positive reviews. John Anderson, writing for Variety, praised the film as a "singular cinematic experience, equally meditative and exciting, and ultimately exhilarating", lauding the film for making the viewer "sit down and notice" the small changes that occur in each shot. Joshua Land of Time Out gave the film a maximum of five stars, praising Benning's direction and the cinematography which Land called beautiful and "hypnotic", adding "to a momentary glance, it might appear that nothing is 'happening' ... but Benning's brilliant use of real time unlocks their inexhaustible potential." Andrew Chan of Slant Magazine lauded both the boldness and serenity of 13 Lakes, praising the cinematography which "reveals itself to be mindfully directed", adding "13 Lakes offers up humility not as a fancy moral pose, but as an acknowledgment that art reflects (rather than transcends) human weakness."

In 2014, 13 Lakes was deemed "culturally, historically, or aesthetically significant" by the Library of Congress and selected for preservation in the United States National Film Registry.

== Themes ==
Benning asserted at the screening of 13 Lakes for the 2005 Tribeca Film Festival that it was an anti-war film, saying that his films—especially 13 Lakes—showed "the kind of beauty we're destroying." Responding to confusion and negative reception from the audience during the screening of the film at Tribeca, Benning said that "Maybe if we looked and listened a little more, we wouldn't do stupid things ... we wouldn't drop bombs on each other." Similarly, Benning regarded Ten Skies as a metaphor for peace. 13 Lakes, like Benning's previous minimalist films, has also been positively compared to paintings of landscapes. Nikolaj Lübecker and Daniele Rugo note that 13 Lakes does not attempt to tell a concrete story and chooses instead to focus on the imagery of film itself; for them, 13 Lakes demands patience from the audience and "might be a place where we find refuge in getting lost. Or, conversely, in finding one's bearings."
