= A Study in Reds =

1932 film

- Directed by: Miriam Bennett
- Release date: 1932
- Running time: 20 minutes
- Country: United States

A Study in Reds is a 1932 polished amateur film by Miriam Bennett which spoofs women's clubs and the Soviet menace in the 1930s. While listening to a tedious lecture on the Soviet threat, Wisconsin Dells’ Tuesday Club members fall asleep and find themselves laboring in an all-women collective in Russia under the unflinching eye of the Soviet special police.

In 2009, it was selected for preservation in the National Film Registry by the Library of Congress for being "culturally, historically or aesthetically" significant.
