= Navajo Film Themselves =

Navajos Film Themselves is a series of seven short documentary films which show scenes of life on the Navajo Nation. The films together were selected for preservation in the United States National Film Registry in 2002.

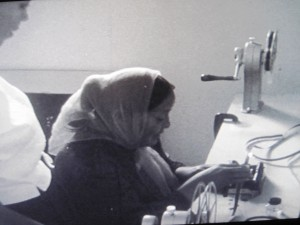
Alta Kahn editing as her daughter Susie Benally looks on.

The films are:

- Intrepid Shadows directed by Al Clah
- The Navajo Silversmith directed by John Nelson
- A Navajo Weaver directed by Susie Benally
- Old Antelope Lake directed by Mike Anderson
- Second Weaver directed by either Susie Benally or Alta Kahn
- The Shallow Well Project directed by John Nelson
- The Spirit of the Navajos directed by Maxine and Mary J. Tsosie

The series is also known as Through Navajo Eyes, due to a confusion with the book that follows.

Original elements for these films are stored at the Library of Congress, Culpeper, Virginia.
