= Lady Helen's Escapade =

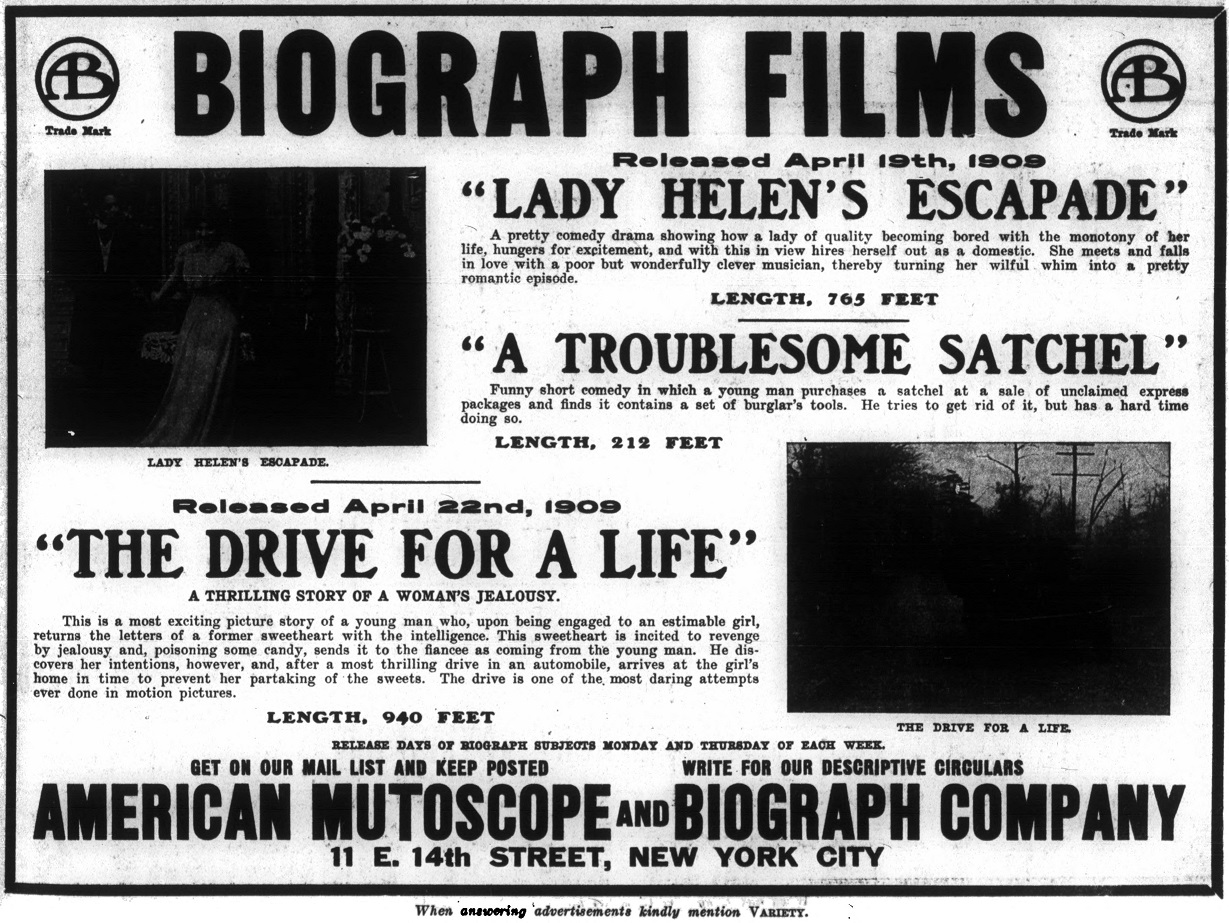
- Advertisement in Variety for this film and other Biograph releases, April 1909
- Directed by: D. W. Griffith
- Written by: Stanner E.V. Taylor
- Starring: Florence Lawrence; David Miles; Anita Hendrie; Owen Moore; Dorothy West; Herbert Prior; Mack Sennett; John R. Cumpson; Arthur V. Johnson; Vivian Prescott; Dorothy Bernard
- Cinematography: G.W. Bitzer
- Distributed by: American Mutoscope and Biograph Company
- Release date: April 19, 1909
- Running time: 8 minutes
- Country: United States
- Language: English

Lady Helen's Escapade is a short American comedy film produced in 1909, directed by D. W. Griffith. It is about the escapades of Lady Helen working as a domestic in a boarding house.

In 2004, the film was deemed "culturally, historically, or aesthetically significant" by the United States Library of Congress and selected for preservation in the National Film Registry.

== Plot ==
Lady Helen (Florence Lawrence) is a wealthy yet immensely bored woman who lives in a luxurious home with her three servants. In seek of adventure, she answers a help wanted in the newspaper and goes slumming as a domestic servant in a boarding house. She makes ludicrous efforts to cook, serve food, and clean, however the men living in the boarding house are enamored with her beauty and charm enough to overlook her incompetence. Among the boarders is a tall handsome violinist (David Miles), whose kindness and musical talent stand out among the crass manners of the other men. Helen and the violinist's romance inspires jealousy among the other maid, who conspire to get rid of Helen by framing her for the theft of the musician's violin. Although the violinist believes Helen is innocent, she is still fired and sent away. Helen soon reveals her true identity and reunites with the musician. After their reunion, Helen secures the violinist a position as a director at a conservatory.

Lady Helen's Escapade (1909)

== Cast ==
- Florence Lawrence as Helen
- David Miles as Violinist
- Anita Henrie [sic, Anita Hendrie]
- Owen Moore as Boyfriend
- Dorothy West as Maid
- Herbert Prior as Footman and Police
- Mack Sennett as Dinner Guest
- John R. Cumpson as Dinner Guest
- Arthur V. Johnson as Dinner Guest
- Vivian Prescott as Dinner Guest
- Dorothy Bernard as Dinner Guest

== Production ==
As was the case with most of the films Griffith made during this period, most of the film's props and costumes were recycled from other productions. Lawrence, the film's star, creatively utilized the recycled costumes to stand out and support her character, and some writers credit her work in Lady Helen's Escapade as the first to use of costume design.

The film has a large cast that often appeared in the same scene—as many as nine performers appeared simultaneously in a single shot—so Griffith could not use close-ups to convey meaning and emotion. To compensate for this, the actors had to exaggerate their movements and gesticulations. As a result, much of the acting in the film resembles traditional stage performance rather than the more subtle performances associated with film.
