= Owen Dodson =

American poet, novelist, and playwright (1914–1983)

- Born: Owen Vincent Dodson; November 28, 1914; Brooklyn, New York, U.S.
- Died: June 21, 1983 (aged 68); New York City, New York, U.S.
- Education: Bates College; Yale School of Drama
- Occupations: Poet, novelist, and playwright

Owen Vincent Dodson (November 28, 1914 – June 21, 1983) was an American poet, novelist, and playwright. He was one of the leading African-American poets of his time, associated with the generation of black poets following the Harlem Renaissance. He received a fellowship from the Rosenwald Foundation for a series of one-act plays.

== Biography ==
Dodson was born on November 28, 1914, in Brooklyn, New York, where he attended Thomas Jefferson High School, graduating in June 1932. He studied at Bates College (earning a B.A. degree in 1936) and at the Yale School of Drama (M.F.A. 1939). He taught at Howard University, where he was chair of the Drama Department, from 1940 to 1970, and briefly at Spelman College and Atlanta University. James V. Hatch has explained that Dodson "is the product of two parallel forces—the Black experience in America with its folk and urban routes, and a classical humanistic education."

Dodson's first poetry collection, Powerful Long Ladder, was published in 1946. His poetry varied widely and covered a broad range of subjects, styles, and forms. He wrote at times, though rarely, in black dialect, and at others quoted and alluded to classical poetry and drama. He wrote about religion and about sexuality—he was gay, though he was briefly engaged to Priscilla Heath, a Bates classmate. One critic describes him as "a brilliant, gay man who discovered his sexual preference early in life, but who was nevertheless unlucky and unhappy in several ill-fated relationships."

He was closely associated with poets W. H. Auden and William Stanley Braithwaite, but his influences were difficult to pin down. In an interview with Charles H. Rowell, Dodson said:

Well, every writer, at the beginning of his career, is influenced by somebody. Surely it's true that the ragtime rhythms of Langston Hughes and the order of Countee Cullen, his devotion to the church, have influenced me. But you know if you listen to Bach and then listen to the early Haydn you can see a cross between the two--you can see that Bach was influenced by Haydn. Then, if you listen to Haydn at his maturity and then listen to Beethoven, then you can see that Beethoven was influenced at the beginning of his career. And if you listen to the greatest Beethoven and then you listen to the early Brahms, you can see that the early Brahms was influenced by the later Beethoven. Then he became his own style. He got his own idea of life. You admire your father, and you imitate his gestures and his stance--the way he talks, the way he holds his glass, the way he kisses his wife. There is something about him that influences you. But then as you grow older, you begin to get your own style, your own class, your own idea of what is going on. Oh, yes, it's true that Langston Hughes and Countee Cullen influenced me.

In drama, Dodson cited Henrik Ibsen as an influence, though again as an initial relationship later to be reworked and half-forgotten. Dodson's two novels are generally considered to be autobiographical.

Dodson died in New York on June 21, 1983, from cardiovascular disease at the age of 69.

Dodson is one of the subjects of Hilton Als' 1996 book The Women; according to Als, Dodson was his mentor and lover.

== Works ==
Poetry:

- Powerful Long Ladder (1946)
- The Confession Stone: Song Cycles (1970)
  - Poems from The Confession Stone were set to music by composer Robert Fleming (1968).
- The Harlem Book of the Dead (1978). Collaboration with photographer James Van Der Zee and artist Camille Billops.

Plays:

- Bayou Legend
- Divine Comedy
- Till Victory Is Won
- New World A-Coming
- Garden of Time (1945)
- The Confession Stone (1960)

Novels:

- Boy at the Window (1951)
- Come Home Early, Child (1967)

== Papers ==
- Moorland-Spingarn Research Center, Howard University
- Countee-Cullen-Harold Jackman Collection, Atlanta University
- James Weldon Johnson Collection, Yale University
- Hatch-Billops Collection, New York, New York.
