= Suzanne, Suzanne =

- Directed by: Camille Billops; James Hatch
- Release date: 1982
- Running time: 30 minutes
- Country: United States
- Language: English

Suzanne, Suzanne is a 1982 short documentary film about a young African-American woman coming to terms with personal and family struggles. The film was directed by Camille Billops and James Hatch and is semi-autobiographical, based on Billops' niece, Suzanne.

== Summary ==
The film focuses on Suzanne, Billops's niece, and her mother, Billie, whose relationship has been strained and accordingly mediated by their shared, but largely unspoken experience of abuse at the hands of the late family patriarch, Brownie. Suzanne, a recovering heroin addict, details the emotional and physical trauma of her childhood as part of the keys to understanding her own self-destruction.

Suzanne, Suzanne is the first of three films in Billops and Hatch's Family Trilogy—which also includes Finding Christa (1991) and String of Pearls (2002).

== Accolades ==
In 2016, the film was selected for preservation in the United States National Film Registry by the Library of Congress as being "culturally, historically, or aesthetically significant".

== See also ==
- 1982 in film
- Drug abuse
