= Heroes All =

1920 film

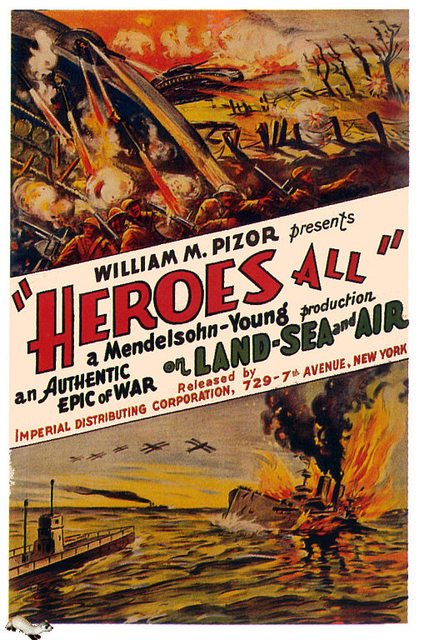
- Theatrical release poster
- Release date: 1920
- Country: United States
- Language: Silent

Heroes All is a 1920 American World War I documentary film that was released by the American Red Cross.

== Description ==
The film examines returning wounded World War I veterans and their treatment at Walter Reed Hospital, along with visits to iconic Washington, D.C., landmarks. The Red Cross Bureau of Pictures produced more than 100 films, including Heroes All, from 1917 to 1921, which are invaluable historical and visual records of the era with footage from World War I and its aftermath.

Several Red Cross cinematographers achieved notable film careers, including Ernest Schoedsack, later producer of Grass (1925), Chang (1927), and King Kong (1933), and A. Farciot Edouart, the latter becoming a special effects cinematographer for Paramount Pictures from the 1920s to the 1950s. According to Internet Movie Database, a sound version was prepared in 1931.

== Honors ==
In 2009, Heroes All was selected for preservation in the National Film Registry by the Library of Congress for being "culturally, historically or aesthetically" significant.
