= A Movie Trip Through Filmland =

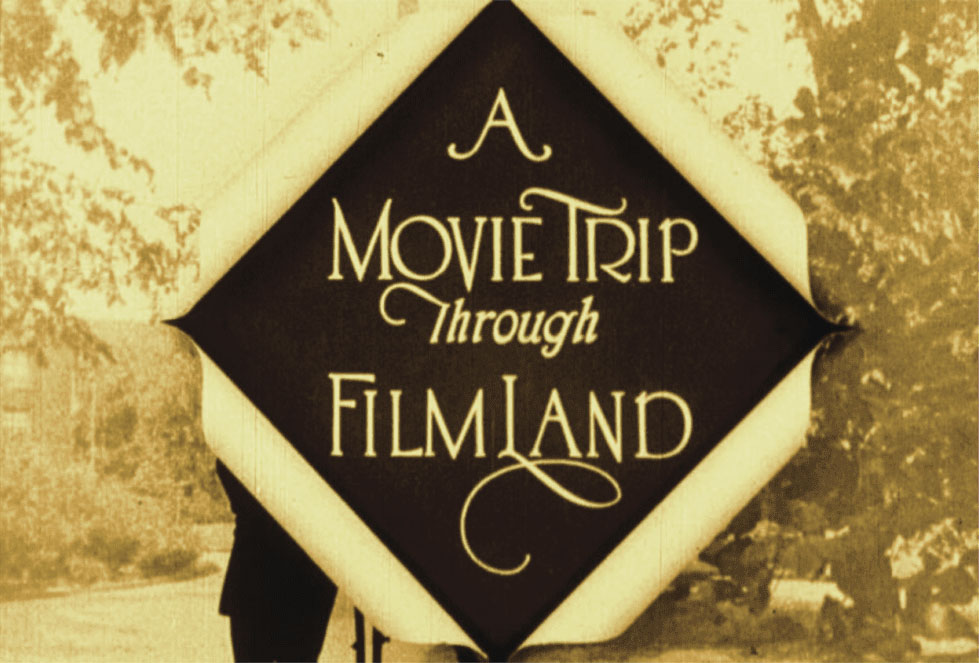
- Opening title card of the film.
- Directed by: Paul Fenton
- Cinematography: Joseph DeFrenes
- Production companies: C.R. Bosworth, DeFrenes & Co.
- Release date: 1921
- Running time: 23 minutes (at 22 fps)

A Movie Trip Through Filmland is a 1921 American silent film directed by Paul Fenton.

== Summary ==
An educational film about the production of motion picture film stock and the impact of movies on global audiences.

== Legacy ==
In 2023, it was selected for preservation in the National Film Registry by the Library of Congress for its cultural and historical importance.
