= Camille Billops =

American sculptor and filmmaker

- Billops in 1971
- Born: Camille Josephine Billops; August 12, 1933; Los Angeles, California, U.S.
- Died: June 1, 2019 (aged 85); New York City, U.S.
- Education: Los Angeles State College; California State University; City College of New York
- Occupations: Visual artist Sculptor; Printmaker
- Spouse: James V. Hatch

Camille Josephine Billops (August 12, 1933 – June 1, 2019) was an African-American sculptor, filmmaker, archivist, printmaker, and educator.

== Early life and education ==
Billops was born in Los Angeles, California, to parents Alma Gilmore, originally from South Carolina, and Luscious Billops, originally from Texas. Her mother was a seamstress, and her father a cook. They worked "in service" for a Beverly Hills family, enabling them to provide her with a private secondary education at a Catholic school. As a young girl, she painted her bow and arrow set and dolls. She traced the beginnings of her art to her parents' creativity in cooking and dressmaking.

Billops graduated in 1960 from Los Angeles State College, where she majored in education for physically handicapped children. She obtained her B.A. degree from California State University and her M.F.A. degree from City College of New York in 1975.

== Work ==
=== Visual art ===
Billops's primary visual art medium was sculpture. Her works are in the permanent collections of the Jersey City Museum and the Museum of Drawers, Bern, Switzerland. Her first exhibition was at Gallerie Akhenaton, where she displayed ceramic pots and sculptures. She later experimented with photography, printmaking, and painting. She exhibited in one-woman and group exhibitions worldwide, including Gallerie Akhenaton, Cairo, Egypt; Hamburg, Germany; Kaohsiung, Taiwan; Gimpel and Weitzenhoffer Gallery; and La Tertulia Museum, Cali, Colombia. She was a longtime friend and colleague of master printmaker Robert Blackburn, whom she assisted in establishing the first printmaking workshop in Asilah in 1978.

=== Film ===
Although she began her career as a sculptor, ceramist, and painter, Billops is best known as a filmmaker of the black diaspora. In 1982, she made Suzanne, Suzanne, a film about her niece and her recovery from a heroin addiction. She directed five more films, including Finding Christa in 1991, a highly autobiographical work that won the Grand Jury Prize for documentaries at the 1992 Sundance Film Festival.

Her other film credits include Older Women and Love in 1987, The KKK Boutique Ain’t Just Rednecks (1994), Take Your Bags (1998) and A String of Pearls (2002). She produced all of her films with her husband and their film company, Mom and Pop Productions.

Billops's film projects have been collaborations with, and stories about, members of her family. They were co-produced with her husband James Hatch and credit Hatch's son as director of photography. Suzanne, Suzanne studies the relationship between Billop's sister Billie and Billie's daughter Suzanne. Finding Christa deals with Billops's daughter, whom she gave up for adoption. Older Women and Love is based on a love affair of Billops's aunt.

=== Hatch-Billops Collection ===
In 1968, the Hatch-Billops Collection began after Billops met James Hatch, a professor of theater at UCLA, through Billops's stepsister, Josie Mae Dotson, who was Hatch's student. Responding to the lack of publications on African American art and culture, Billops and Hatch began collecting thousands of books and other printed materials, more than 1,200 interviews, and scripts of nearly 1,000 plays. Once housed in a 120-foot-long (37 m) loft in Lower Manhattan, the Collection is now largely located at the Camille Billops and James V. Hatch archives at the Stuart A. Rose Manuscript, Archives, and Rare Books Library at Emory University.

In 1981, Billops and Hatch began publishing Artist and Influence: The Journal of Black American Cultural History, an annual journal featuring interviews with noted American "marginalized artists" across a wide range of genres. To date, more than 400 interviews have been recorded. Artist and Influence is also part of the collection at Emory.

=== Collaborative work ===
Billops collaborated with photographer James Van Der Zee and poet, scholar, and playwright Owen Dodson on The Harlem Book of the Dead, which was published in 1978 with an introduction by Toni Morrison. Billops acted a play, America Hurrah, which portrays the status of America at that time with her husband James Hatch. She also published a book, "The Art of Remembering", with Hatch.

=== SoHo loft ===
In the early 1980s, Billops and Hatch purchased a 4,000-square foot loft in SoHo, Manhattan and expanded it to include a studio, office and library open to students of City College of New York. She stated, "We invited everybody here: friends, students and white folks, gallerists and curators. We sold art right off our walls. I stopped begging a long time ago when I discovered I could sell art without having to kiss booty.”

== Personal life ==
In 1955, Billops met Stanford, a lieutenant stationed at the Los Angeles Air Force Base in El Segundo. He was noted as being tall and handsome, and Billops later stated, "I loved him, because he was fine...He was everything I wanted that thing to be." She became pregnant a few months into their relationship. She had been disinterested in motherhood, but Billops felt obligated to honor the traditional role of wife and mother at the time. She and Stanford became engaged. However, Stanford was discharged from the military and disappeared before they could get married. Her daughter, Christa, was later born.

In 1959, Billops was introduced to James V. Hatch, a professor at the University of California, Los Angeles by her sister, Josie, who had been his student. At the time, Hatch was married with two children. Billops eventually insisted that Hatch leave his family to start a new life with her, which he eventually did in the early 1960s. In 1960, Billops made the decision to give her daughter, Christa, up for adoption, in order to throw herself fully into her art. Billops had refused to allow her family to take the child. She drove her daughter to the Los Angeles Children’s Home Society of California, an orphanage. At the time, Christa was four years old. Billops asked Christa to go inside to the bathroom, and drove away. Christa was later adopted by a jazz singer in Oakland. She and Hatch then went on to live their lives in New York City, where Hatch was a tenured professor of English at CCNY, a playwright, and a theater producer, and they were married in 1987.

When Christa was grown, Camille allowed her into her life. Her 1991 film Finding Christa is about meeting her adult daughter. In 2016, Christa died from heart failure at 59 years old. She had refused a necessary operation and was found alone in her Bronx apartment.

In an interview conducted by Ameena Meer, Camille claims that her transition from art to film was influenced by her husband. In 1996, Camille and her husband spent some time in India. During their five months in India, they experienced a cultural clash between the art that she was producing and Indian culture. Because of this, she pursued different artistic approaches. Camille, at first, worked on plays, then moved into film.

=== Appearance ===
Billops had a style in her appearance that was unique. Amena Meer's first sight of Camille was her wearing an outfit that had beads clicking in her braids, feathers, a man's hat on, and black-rimmed eyes. The black rimmed eyes were similar to the way women rimmed their eyes in ancient Egypt. She also had a hairy upper lip and wore Afro-Asian necklaces. Being a performer, her style was noticed.

== Awards and honors ==
- 1963: Fellowship from Huntington Hardford Foundation
- 1975: MacDowell Colony Fellowship
- 1975-76: International Women's Year Award
- 1992: Sundance Film Festival, Grand Jury Prize for documentaries for Finding Christa
- 1994: James VanDerZee Award, Brandywine Graphic Workshop

== Filmography ==
- 1982: Suzanne, Suzanne (Documentary short) – Director
- 1987: Older Women and Love (Documentary short) – Director
- 1991: Finding Christa (Documentary) – Director, producer, writer
- 1994: The KKK Boutique Ain’t Just Rednecks – Director
- 1998: Take Your Bags (Short) – Director
- 2002: A String of Pearls (Documentary) – Director, producer, production designer
- 2009: And That's the Way It Is (Short) – Production manager

== Selected exhibitions ==
- 2019: Georgia Museum of Art at the University of Georgia, Atlanta, Georgia.
- 2016: Still Raising Hell: The Art, Activism, and Archives of Camille Billops and James V. Hatch, Atlanta, Georgia.
- 1997: Inside the Minstrel Mask, Noel Fine Art Acquisitions, Charlotte, North Carolina
- 1991: Black Filmmakers Hall of Fame, Oakland, California
- 1990: Clark College, Atlanta, Georgia
- 1986: Calkins Gallery, Hofstra University, Hempstead, New York
- 1983: American Center, Karachi, Pakistan; Pescadores Hsien Library, Makung, Republic of China
- 1980: Buchandlung Welt, Hamburg, Germany
- 1997: Rutgers University, Newark, New Jersey
- 1973: Ornette Coleman's Artist House, New York, New York
- 1965: Gallerie Akhenaton, Cairo, Egypt
