= Behind Every Good Man =

1967 American short film

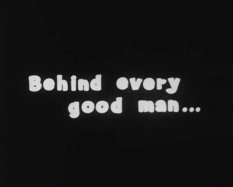
- Directed by: Nikolai Ursin
- Release date: 1967
- Running time: 8 minutes
- Country: United States
- Language: English

Behind Every Good Man is a 1967 American short film directed by Nikolai Ursin. The film follows an unidentified African-American trans woman through one day of her life in Los Angeles. In 2022, Behind Every Good Man was selected for preservation in the United States National Film Registry of the Library of Congress for being "culturally, historically, or aesthetically significant".

Transgender film critics Willow Maclay and Caden Gardner characterized the film as "a hybrid of documentary and scripted fiction".

== Plot ==
The film opens with the woman walking through the street and attracting stares and glimpses from other men. She begins talking with one of the men, and gets so engrossed within the conversation that she misses her bus, and agrees to go on a date with him. Later, while dressing up for the date, she narrates how she was once inspected by an undercover cop when she entered the mens bathroom. As she waits in her house for the date to show up, she looks outside the window and puts on a record, but he does not arrive. Three songs play throughout the film: the Dionne Warwick recordings of "Reach Out for Me" and "Wishin' and Hopin'", and The Supremes recording of "I'll Turn to Stone".

== Legacy ==
The UCLA Film & Television Archive preserved Behind Every Good Man in 2017 as part of the Outfest UCLA Legacy Project, writing "In strong contrast to the stereotypically negative and hostile depictions of transgender persons as seen through the lens of Hollywood at the time, the subject of Ursin's independent film is rendered as stable, hopeful and well-adjusted. The resulting intimate portrait serves as a rare cultural artifact of transgender life and African-American life in the U.S. at the mid-century." Mark Quigley, a curator for the archive, wrote that the film "artfully blurs elements of cinéma vérité documentary and subtle dramatization to bring his lead’s deeply personal aspirations and meditations on love and acceptance to light."

== See also ==
- List of American films of 1967
- List of LGBTQ-related films of 1967
