= The Story of Menstruation =

- Title card for The Story of Menstruation
- Produced by: Walt Disney
- Production company: Walt Disney Productions
- Distributed by: International Cello-Cotton Company (now as Kimberly-Clark Corporation)
- Release date: November 1, 1946
- Running time: 10 minutes
- Country: United States
- Language: English

The Story of Menstruation is a 1946 American animated short film produced by Walt Disney Productions. It was commissioned by the International Cello-Cotton Company (now Kimberly-Clark) and was shown in a non-theatrical release to approximately 105 million American students in health education classes. In 2015, the United States Library of Congress selected the film for preservation in the National Film Registry, finding it "culturally, historically, or aesthetically significant".

== History ==
The Story of Menstruation was part of a series of films that Disney produced for American schools between 1945 and 1951. Gynecologist Mason Hohn was hired as a consultant to ensure that the film was scientifically accurate and to increase the likelihood that school doctors and nurses would allow the film to be shown. Hohn's involvement led to a stronger emphasis on biology than other marketing by ICCC. The Story of Menstruation's reputation was increased when it received the Good Housekeeping Seal of Approval.

It was one of the first commercially sponsored films to be distributed to high schools. It was distributed with a booklet for teachers and students called Very Personally Yours that featured advertising of the Kotex brand of products, and discouraged the use of tampons, when the market was dominated by the Tampax brand of tampons from Tampax Inc.

== Plot ==
The film alternates between clinical panels describing the process of menstruation, and animated sequences that provide viewers with tips on hygiene and behavior.

The film uses animated diagrams to detail the menstrual cycle. The film's narrator, who is not identified in the credits, informs the viewer that "there is nothing strange or mysterious about menstruation", and it shows women engaged in activities such as bathing, riding a horse, and dancing during their menstrual cycles. The film's narration by actress Gloria Blondell also provides advice to avoid constipation and depression, and to always keep up a fine outward appearance. The second half of the video has been perceived as condescending, with remarks about posture, wearing makeup, and for girls to be nice regardless of their pain.

The Story of Menstruation is believed to be the first film to use the word "vagina" in its screenplay. Sexuality is not mentioned in the film, and an emphasis on sanitation makes it, as Disney historian Jim Korkis has suggested, "a hygienic crisis rather than a maturational event". The menstrual flow was depicted as snow white instead of blood red.

The film's copyright was renewed by Walt Disney Productions on December 3, 1973.

== See also ==
- Culture and menstruation
