= Fuentes Family Home Movies =

1920s and 1930s American film collection

The Fuentes Family Home Movies are a collection of home movies made by Antonio Rodríguez Fuentes (1895–1988) in the 1920s and 1930s. The collection of films totals 14 reels and was shot on 9.5mm film, a format that was primarily popular in Europe.

The home movies captured the Fuentes family and their experiences in the Mexican-American community on both sides of the border in Mexico and Texas, including parades and events that happened early on in the border towns. In 2015, the original 9.5mm film reels were preserved by The Texas Archive of the Moving Image in partnership with Texas A&M University-Corpus Christi. Six of the films are available on the Texas Archive of the Moving Image's website for viewing.

In 2017, the collection of films were selected for preservation in the National Film Registry by the Library of Congress, being deemed "culturally, historically and aesthetically significant".
