= Think of Me First as a Person =

- Directed by: George Ingmire
- Starring: Dwight Core (voice); Dwight Core Jr.
- Cinematography: Dwight Core
- Edited by: George Ingmire
- Release date: 2006
- Country: United States
- Language: English

Think of Me First as a Person is a documentary film and home movie about Dwight Core Jr., a boy with Down syndrome. The footage was originally shot throughout the 1960s and '70s by Core's father, Dwight Core Sr. The footage was later discovered and completed by the filmmaker's grandson, George Ingmire.

The film was first shown at New Orleans' 2006 Home Movie Day. Later that year, it was selected for preservation in the United States National Film Registry, an honor bestowed every year to twenty-five films deemed "culturally, historically, or aesthetically significant." The Library of Congress's statement announcing the 2006 additions to the Registry called the film a "loving portrait by a father of his son with Down syndrome" that represented "the creativity and craftsmanship of the American amateur filmmaker."

The film's title comes from the 1974 Rita Dranginis poem of the same name.

== See also ==
- Lily: A Longitudinal View of Life with Down Syndrome
