= George Veditz =

American deaf educator

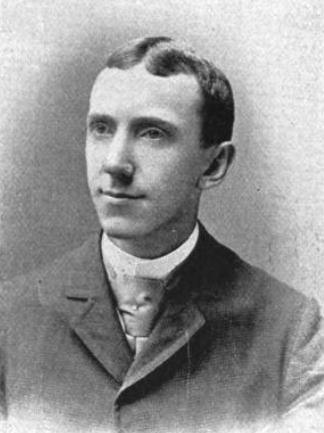
- Born: George William Veditz; August 13, 1861; Baltimore, Maryland, US
- Died: March 12, 1937 (aged 75); Colorado, US
- Occupations: teacher, former president of National Association of the Deaf, and one of the first American Sign Language filmmakers.

Preservation of the Sign Language (1913)

George William Veditz (August 13, 1861 – March 12, 1937) was an American educator, filmmaker, and activist who served as the seventh President of the National Association of the Deaf from 1904 to 1910. He is remembered as one of the most ardent and visible advocates of American Sign Language (ASL) and was one of the first people to film ASL. His 1913 film "Preservation of the Sign Language" was added to the National Film Registry in 2010.

== Early life ==
George William Veditz was born in Baltimore to German immigrant parents. He was enrolled at Zion School, a bilingual school, at age five. He became fluent in both German and English before losing his hearing at age eight due to scarlet fever. After initially being educated by a private instructor, he entered the Maryland School for the Deaf in 1875. From 1880 to 1884 he attended the National Deaf-Mute College (now Gallaudet University), graduating as class valedictorian.

== Career ==
=== Teaching ===
Following his graduation from the National College, Veditz returned to the Maryland School for the Deaf as a teacher. The next year, in 1885, he accepted a teaching position at the Colorado School for the Deaf, where he worked for seventeen years. While in Colorado, he maintained ties with the Maryland School, serving as a leader of its alumni association, and providing the foundation for what would become the Maryland Association of the Deaf.

=== President of the National Association of the Deaf ===
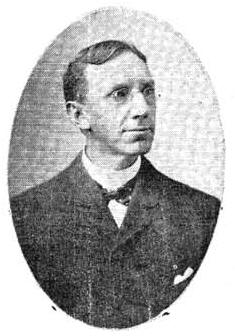
George Veditz, circa 1911

In 1904, Veditz was elected president of the National Association of the Deaf (NAD) and was re-elected in 1907. While President, his greatest preoccupation was the preservation of ASL, which he saw as being threatened by the advancement of the Oralism in schools. During this time, cinema gained popularity, and Veditz dedicated the NAD to raising money to finance recordings of speeches in sign language.

The project, which began in 1910, aimed to film the masterful uses of sign language. One of the people recorded was the then-director of Gallaudet, Edward Miner Gallaudet. The shootings of the NAD were the first registry done of sign languages in the world, and are considered a valuable document of Deaf history. In the film, Veditz makes an enthusiastic defence of the right of the Deaf people to use sign language and talks of its beauty, as well as its value to humanity. The Library of Congress announced on December 28, 2011, that it had named the landmark 1913 film, The Preservation of the Sign Language, for inclusion in the National Film Registry.

In August 1913, Veditz conveyed the sentiments of US President Woodrow Wilson to the people attending the tenth NAD convention in Cleveland, Ohio, translating from a note that President Wilson had handwritten and had delivered to Veditz.

=== Death ===
Veditz died on 12th March 1937, when he was 75 years old in Colorado.

== ASL festival ==
Since 1997, Veditz has been remembered by the George Veditz ASL Festival, dedicated to celebrate the wealth of sign language with literary poetry and stories.

== Deaf Cultural Digital Library ==
The Deaf Cultural Digital Library (DCDL) Law has been passed and signed by the governor of Maryland in May 2014, the first of its kind in the US. The law comes under the Department of Education and is managed by the State of Maryland Librarian and the DCDL Coordinator. The DCDL Advisory Committee has been established in spring 2016. Friends of DCDL group has begun in November 2016. The Montgomery County Public Library can show how to join and support the DCDL.

== Quotations ==
- "As long as we have deaf people on earth, we will have signs. And as long as we have our films, we can preserve our beautiful signs in their old purity. It is my hope that we all will love and guard our beautiful sign language as the noblest gift God has given to deaf people."—George Veditz, 1913.

== See also ==
- Writings By George W. Veditz
- Gallaudet University
- Colorado Association for the Deaf's history of George Veditz
- Translating Veditz
- Translation of Veditz's speech--The Preservation of the Sign Language"

Cultural offices
Preceded by James L. Smith	President of the National Association of the Deaf (United States); 1904-1910	Succeeded by Olof Hanson
