= Time and Dreams =

- Directed by: Mort Jordan
- Release date: 1976
- Running time: 51 minutes
- Country: United States
- Language: English

Time and Dreams is a 1976 documentary created by Mort Jordan, a graduate student at Temple University, about residents of Greene County, Alabama and its changing racial history.

== Summary ==
Filmed in black-and-white, it features voiceovers of white residents reflecting on political and racial changes in Greene County in the wake of the civil rights movement.

== Reception ==
The film was a runner-up for a Student Academy Award. A review from 1979 by Robert Hemenway described its importance as a document of "attitudes toward tradition" in the South, but criticised the "concentration on white perceptions of blacks, leaving only the narrator to expose flaws in such visions".

== Rediscovery ==
Besides the rare screening, the film remained relatively obscure and had no iMDb listing, until the Library of Congress selected it for preservation in the United States National Film Registry in 2017. It had initially been recommended by the manager of Temple University's film archive, Leonard Guercio. The Registry called it "a unique and personal elegiac approach to the civil rights movement."
