= The Inner World of Aphasia =

1968 American medical training film

The Inner World of Aphasia is a 1968 medical training film by co-directors Edward Feil and Naomi Feil of Edward Feil Productions for case w. It portrays patients with aphasia and follows their experiences through their recoveries. Noted for its innovative artistic direction and empathetic approach to patients with aphasia, the film was selected for preservation in the National Film Registry in 2015.

== Plot ==
The film follows Marge Nelson (portrayed by Naomi Feil), a nurse who treats patients with aphasia. Marge is overworked, and unsympathetic towards her patients, experiencing frustration at their behavior and apparent inability to communicate.

Upon having an accident, and sustaining brain damage, Marge herself experiences aphasia and undergoes treatment at the same hospital where she previously worked. While struggling to deal with the emotions around her trauma and new issues with processing information and communicating, Marge also discovers a startling lack of empathy from hospital staff and therapists treating her.

Marge finds a new friend in a second patient who has aphasia. The film shows us that, like Marge, this second patient has also experienced a lack of empathy from others, except in his case it is his family members who are unable to understand his illness.

Through this new friendship, Marge changes the emotional direction of her life and takes the first steps towards her recovery.

== Reception ==
The Inner World of Aphasia was praised by contemporary sources for its attention to patient experience, particularly for drawing attention to the ways in which patients treated for aphasia in the 1960s were dehumanized by hospital staff and family members.

Compared to other media portrayals of aphasia the time, The Inner World of Aphasia was unique for its focus on portraying "the complex subjective feel of what it is like to be an aphasic." Its use of flashback, optical distortions, and audio editing techniques were noted by medical professionals as accurately conveying the experience of a person with aphasia (such as hemiplegia and hemianopsia).

== Awards and recognition ==
In 1968, The Inner World of Aphasia received the Golden Eagle from The Council on International Non-Theatrical Events (CINE), the organization's highest honor.

In 1969, The American Journal of Nursing included The Inner World of Aphasia on its list of films screened by the American Nurses Association / National League of Nurses Film Committee and recommended for screening to nurses and nursing students.

In 2015, The Inner World of Aphasia was selected for preservation in the National Film Registry by the Library of Congress, a selection of films noted as being worthy of protection by the United States National Film Preservation Board and chosen to be preserved through the Library of Congress, as well as other institutions who may contain either original or newly made prints and copies.
