= Our Day =

- Directed by: Wallace Kelly
- Produced by: Wallace Kelly
- Cinematography: Wallace Kelly
- Edited by: Wallace Kelly
- Release date: 1938
- Running time: 16 minutes
- Country: United States

Our Day is a silent documentary short directed by Wallace Kelly in 1938, about a day in the life of the Kelly family in Lebanon, Kentucky. It starred his mother, wife, brother, pet cat and dog, and Wallace himself. It countered the contemporary stereotypes of impoverished Southerners eking out a living during the Depression by documenting a modern home with adults with sophisticated interests.

Our Day was selected for preservation in the National Film Registry by the Librarian of Congress in 2007, being deemed "culturally, historically, or aesthetically significant".

== Wallace Kelly ==
Wallace Kelly (1910–1988) was a photographer, amateur filmmaker, and author in the United States. His wife Mabel, née Graham, Kelly and other family members appear in his films about daily life and travels. He wrote Days Are As Grass.

Kelly was born in Lebanon, Kentucky where his ancestors settled in the 18th century. He served as a medic in World War II and attended Center College and the Cincinnati Art Academy.
