= National Film Registry =

Selection of films for preservation in the US Library of Congress

- Former logo
- Founded: 1988; 38 years ago; United States
- Type: Film preservation
- Website: loc.gov/programs/national-film-preservation-board/film-registry

The National Film Registry (NFR) is the United States National Film Preservation Board's (NFPB) collection of films selected for preservation, each for its cultural, historical and aesthetic contributions since the NFPB's inception in 1988.

== History ==
Throughout the 1980s, several prominent filmmakers and industry personalities in the United States, such as Frank Capra and Martin Scorsese, advocated for Congress to enact a film preservation bill in order to avoid commercial modifications (such as pan and scan and editing for television) of classic films, which they saw as negative. In response to the controversy over the colorization of originally black and white films in the decade specifically, Representatives Robert J. Mrazek and Sidney R. Yates introduced the National Film Preservation Act of 1988, which established the National Film Registry, its purpose, and the criteria for selecting films for preservation. The Act was passed and the NFR's mission was subsequently reauthorized by further acts of Congress in 1992, 1996, 2005, 2008 and 2016. The National Film Preservation Board's mission, to which the NFR contributes, is to ensure the survival, conservation, and increased public availability of America's film heritage. The 1996 law also created the non-profit National Film Preservation Foundation which, although affiliated with the NFPB, raises money from the private sector. Inductees are announced in the final quarter of the year, usually in mid-to-late December. The only year where this deadline was missed was 2025, due to the 2025 US federal government shutdown, with that year's selections being officially announced on January 29, 2026.

== Selection criteria ==
Taken together, the ... films in the National Film Registry represent a stunning range of American filmmaking—including Hollywood features, documentaries, avant-garde and amateur productions, films of regional interest, ethnic, animated, and short film subjects—all deserving recognition, preservation and access by future generations. As we begin this new millennium, the registry stands among the finest summations of American cinema's wondrous first century.

— Doctor James H. Billington, Librarian of Congress.

The NFPB adds to the NFR up to 25 "culturally, historically or aesthetically significant films" each year in December, showcasing the range and diversity of American film heritage to increase awareness for its preservation. A film becomes eligible for inclusion ten years after its original release. For the first selection in 1989, the public nominated almost 1,000 films for consideration. Members of the NFPB then developed individual ballots of possible films for inclusion. The ballots were tabulated into a list of 25 films that was then modified by Librarian of Congress James H. Billington and his staff at the Library for the final selection. Since 1997, members of the public have been able to nominate up to 50 films a year for the NFPB and Librarian to consider, with an August submission deadline.

The NFR, collaborating with other archives, studios, copyright holders and individuals, includes films ranging from Hollywood classics to orphan films. A film is not required to be feature-length, nor is it required to have been theatrically released in the traditional sense. The Registry contains newsreels, silent films, student films, experimental films, short films, music videos, films out of copyright protection or in the public domain, film serials, home movies, documentaries, animation and independent films. As of the 2025 listing, there are 925 films in the Registry.

== Films ==
Film title	Film type	Year of release	Year of induction	Reference
3:10 to Yuma	Narrative feature	1957	2012	
4 Little Girls	Documentary	1997	2017	
The 7th Voyage of Sinbad	Narrative feature	1958	2008	
12 Angry Men	Narrative feature	1957	2007	
12 Years a Slave	Narrative feature	2013	2023	
13 Lakes	Documentary/experimental film	2004	2014	
20 Feet from Stardom	Documentary	2013	2023	
42nd Street	Narrative feature	1933	1998	
2001: A Space Odyssey	Narrative feature	1968	1991	
20,000 Leagues Under the Sea	Narrative feature	1916	2016	
Abbott and Costello Meet Frankenstein	Narrative feature	1948	2001	
Ace in the Hole	Narrative feature	1951	2017	
Adam's Rib	Narrative feature	1949	1992	
The Adventures of Robin Hood±	Narrative feature	1938	1995	
The African Queen	Narrative feature	1951	1994	
Airplane!	Narrative feature	1980	2010	
Alambrista!	Narrative feature	1977	2023	
Alien	Narrative feature	1979	2002	
All About Eve	Narrative feature	1950	1990	
All My Babies	Short subject/educational film	1953	2002	
All Quiet on the Western Front	Narrative feature	1930	1990	
All That Heaven Allows	Narrative feature	1955	1995	
All That Jazz	Narrative feature	1979	2001	
All the King's Men	Narrative feature	1949	2001	
All the President's Men	Narrative feature	1976	2010	
Allures	Short subject/experimental film	1961	2011	
Amadeus	Narrative feature	1984	2019	
America America	Narrative feature	1963	2001	
American Graffiti	Narrative feature	1973	1995	
An American in Paris	Narrative feature	1951	1993	
American Me	Narrative feature	1992	2024	
Anatomy of a Murder	Narrative feature	1959	2012	
Angels with Dirty Faces	Narrative feature	1938	2024	
Annabelle Serpentine Dance	Short subject	1895	2024	
Annie Hall	Narrative feature	1977	1992	
Antonia: A Portrait of the Woman	Documentary	1974	2003	
The Apartment	Narrative feature	1960	1994	
Apocalypse Now	Narrative feature	1979	2000	
Apollo 13	Narrative feature	1995	2023	
Applause	Narrative feature	1929	2006	
The Asphalt Jungle	Narrative feature	1950	2008	
Atlantic City	Narrative feature	1980	2003	
The Atomic Cafe	Documentary	1982	2016	
Attica	Documentary	1974	2022	
The Augustas	Home film	1930s–1950s	2012	
The Awful Truth	Narrative feature	1937	1996	
Baby Face	Narrative feature	1933	2005	
Back to the Future	Narrative feature	1985	2007	
The Bad and the Beautiful	Narrative feature	1952	2002	
Bad Day at Black Rock	Narrative feature	1955	2018	
Badlands	Narrative feature	1973	1993	
Ball of Fire	Narrative feature	1941	2016	
The Ballad of Gregorio Cortez	Narrative feature	1982	2022	
Bambi	Animated narrative feature	1942	2011	
Bamboozled	Narrative feature	2000	2023	
The Band Wagon	Narrative feature	1953	1995	
The Bank Dick	Narrative feature	1940	1992	
The Bargain	Narrative feature	1914	2010	
The Battle of San Pietro	Documentary	1945	1991	
The Battle of the Century	Short subject	1927	2020	
The Beau Brummels	Short subject	1928	2016	
Beauty and the Beast	Animated narrative feature	1991	2002	
Becky Sharp	Narrative feature	1935	2019	
Before Stonewall	Documentary	1984	2019	
Before Sunrise	Narrative feature	1995	2025	
Behind Every Good Man	Documentary/short subject	1967	2022	
Being There	Narrative feature	1979	2015	
Ben-Hur: A Tale of the Christ	Narrative feature	1925	1997	
Ben-Hur	Narrative feature	1959	2004	
Bert Williams: Lime Kiln Club Field Day	Narrative feature	1913	2014	
The Best Years of Our Lives	Narrative feature	1946	1989	
Betty Tells Her Story	Documentary/short subject	1972	2022	
Beverly Hills Cop	Narrative feature	1984	2024	
Big Business	Short subject	1929	1992	
The Big Chill	Narrative feature	1983	2025	
The Big Heat	Narrative feature	1953	2011	
The Big Lebowski	Narrative feature	1998	2014	
The Big Parade	Narrative feature	1925	1992	
The Big Sleep	Narrative feature	1946	1997	
The Big Trail	Narrative feature	1930	2006	
The Birds	Narrative feature	1963	2016	
The Birth of a Nation	Narrative feature	1915	1992	
Black and Tan	Short subject	1929	2015	
The Black Pirate	Narrative feature	1926	1993	
The Black Stallion	Narrative feature	1979	2002	
Blackboard Jungle	Narrative feature	1955	2016	
Blacksmith Scene	Short subject	1893	1995	
Blade Runner	Narrative feature	1982	1993	
Blazing Saddles	Narrative feature	1974	2006	
Bless Their Little Hearts	Narrative feature	1984	2013	
The Blood of Jesus	Narrative feature	1941	1991	
The Blue Bird	Narrative feature	1918	2004	
The Blues Brothers	Narrative feature	1980	2020	
Body and Soul	Narrative feature	1925	2019	
Bohulano Family Film Collection	Home films	1950s–1970s	2023	
Bonnie and Clyde	Narrative feature	1967	1992	
Born Yesterday	Narrative feature	1950	2012	
Boulevard Nights	Narrative feature	1979	2017	
Boys Don't Cry	Narrative feature	1999	2019	
Boyz n the Hood	Narrative feature	1991	2002	
Brandy in the Wilderness	Narrative feature	1969	2013	
Bread	Narrative feature	1918	2020	
Breakfast at Tiffany's	Narrative feature	1961	2012	
The Breakfast Club	Narrative feature	1985	2016	
Bride of Frankenstein	Narrative feature	1935	1998	
The Bridge on the River Kwai	Narrative feature	1957	1997	
Bringing Up Baby	Narrative feature	1938	1990	
Broadcast News	Narrative feature	1987	2018	
Brokeback Mountain	Narrative feature	2005	2018	
Broken Blossoms	Narrative feature	1919	1996	
A Bronx Morning	Short subject/experimental film	1931	2004	
Brooklyn Bridge	Documentary	1981	2025	
Buena Vista Social Club	Documentary	1999	2020	
The Buffalo Creek Flood: An Act of Man	Documentary	1975	2005	
Bullitt	Narrative feature	1968	2007	
Bush Mama	Narrative feature	1979	2022	
Butch Cassidy and the Sundance Kid	Narrative feature	1969	2003	
Cab Calloway's home movies	Home films	1948–1951	2022	
Cabaret	Narrative feature	1972	1995	
Cabin in the Sky	Narrative feature	1943	2020	
The Cameraman	Narrative feature	1928	2005	
Carmen Jones	Narrative feature	1954	1992	
Carrie	Narrative feature	1976	2022	
Casablanca	Narrative feature	1942	1989	
Castro Street	Documentary/short subject/experimental film	1966	1992	
Cat People	Narrative feature	1942	1993	
Chan Is Missing	Narrative feature	1982	1995	
Charade	Narrative feature	1963	2022	
The Cheat	Narrative feature	1915	1993	
The Chechahcos	Narrative feature	1924	2003	
Chelsea Girls	Experimental film	1966	2024	
Chicana	Documentary/short subject	1979	2021	
Chinatown	Narrative feature	1974	1991	
A Christmas Story	Narrative feature	1983	2012	
Chulas Fronteras	Documentary	1976	1993	
Cicero March	Documentary/short subject	1966	2013	
Cinderella	Animated narrative feature	1950	2018	
Citizen Kane	Narrative feature	1941	1989	
The City	Documentary/short subject	1939	1998	
City Lights	Narrative feature	1931	1991	
Civilization	Narrative feature	1916	1999	
The Clash of the Wolves	Narrative feature	1925	2004	
Clerks	Narrative feature	1994	2019	
A Clockwork Orange	Narrative feature	1971	2020	
Close Encounters of the Third Kind	Narrative feature	1977	2007	
Clueless	Narrative feature	1995	2025	
Coal Miner's Daughter	Narrative feature	1980	2019	
Cologne: From the Diary of Ray and Esther	Documentary/short subject	1939	2001	
Commandment Keeper Church, Beaufort South Carolina, May 1940	Documentary/short subject	1940	2005	
Common Threads: Stories from the Quilt	Documentary	1989	2024	
Compensation	Narrative feature	1999	2024	
A Computer Animated Hand	Animated short subject/experimental film	1972	2011	
The Conversation	Narrative feature	1974	1995	
Cool Hand Luke	Narrative feature	1967	2005	
Cooley High	Narrative feature	1975	2021	
The Cool World	Narrative feature	1963	1994	
Cops	Short subject	1922	1997	
The Corbett–Fitzsimmons Fight	Documentary	1897	2012	
A Corner in Wheat	Short subject	1909	1994	
The Court Jester	Narrative feature	1956	2004	
Crisis: Behind a Presidential Commitment	Documentary	1963	2011	
The Crowd	Narrative feature	1928	1989	
Cruisin' J-Town	Documentary/short subject	1975	2023	
The Cry of the Children	Short subject	1912	2011	
The Cry of Jazz	Documentary/short subject	1959	2010	
A Cure for Pokeritis	Short subject	1912	2011	
The Curse of Quon Gwon	Short subject	1916–1917	2006	
Cyrano de Bergerac	Narrative feature	1950	2022	
Czechoslovakia 1968	Documentary/short subject	1969	1997	
D.O.A.	Narrative feature	1950	2004	
Dance, Girl, Dance	Narrative feature	1940	2007	
Dances With Wolves	Narrative feature	1990	2007	
The Dark Knight	Narrative feature	2008	2020	
Daughter of Dawn	Narrative feature	1920	2013	
Daughter of Shanghai	Narrative feature	1937	2006	
Daughters of the Dust	Narrative feature	1991	2004	
David Holzman's Diary	Narrative feature	1967	1991	
The Day the Earth Stood Still	Narrative feature	1951	1995	
Days of Heaven	Narrative feature	1978	2007	
Days of Wine and Roses	Narrative feature	1962	2018	
Dead Birds	Documentary	1964	1998	
Decasia	Experimental film	2002	2013	
The Decline of Western Civilization	Documentary	1981	2016	
The Deer Hunter	Narrative feature	1978	1996	
Deliverance	Narrative feature	1972	2008	
Demolishing and Building Up the Star Theatre	Documentary/short subject	1901	2002	
Desperately Seeking Susan	Narrative feature	1985	2023	
Destry Rides Again	Narrative feature	1939	1996	
Detour	Narrative feature	1945	1992	
The Devil Never Sleeps	Documentary	1994	2020	
The Dickson Experimental Sound Film	Short subject/experimental film	1894 or 1895	2003	
Die Hard	Narrative feature	1988	2017	
Dinner at Eight	Narrative feature	1933	2023	
Dirty Dancing	Narrative feature	1987	2024	
Dirty Harry	Narrative feature	1971	2012	
Disneyland Dream	Home film	1956	2008	
Dixon-Wanamaker Expedition to Crow Agency	Documentary/short subject	1908	2018	
Do the Right Thing	Narrative feature	1989	1999	
The Docks of New York	Narrative feature	1928	1999	
Dodsworth	Narrative feature	1936	1990	
Dog Day Afternoon	Narrative feature	1975	2009	
Dog Star Man	Short subject/experimental film series	1961–1964	1992	
Dont Look Back	Documentary	1967	1998	
Double Indemnity	Narrative feature	1944	1992	
Down Argentine Way	Narrative feature	1940	2014	
Dr. Strangelove or: How I Learned to Stop Worrying and Love the Bomb	Narrative feature	1964	1989	
Dracula	Narrative feature	1931	2000	
Dracula (Spanish version)	Narrative feature	1931	2015	
The Dragon Painter	Narrative feature	1919	2014	
Dream of a Rarebit Fiend	Short subject	1906	2015	
Drums of Winter	Documentary	1988	2006	
Duck Amuck	Animated short subject	1953	1999	
Duck and Cover	Animated short subject	1951	2004	
Duck Soup	Narrative feature	1933	1990	
Dumbo	Animated narrative feature	1941	2017	
E.T. the Extra-Terrestrial	Narrative feature	1982	1994	
Eadweard Muybridge, Zoopraxographer	Documentary	1975	2015	
Early Abstractions (Note: Numbers 1–5, 7, and 10)	Animated short subject	1939–1956	2006	
East of Eden	Narrative feature	1955	2016	
Easy Rider	Narrative feature	1969	1998	
Eaux d'Artifice	Short subject/experimental film	1953	1993	
Edge of the City	Narrative feature	1957	2023	
Edison Kinetographic Record of a Sneeze	Documentary/short subject	1894	2015	
El Mariachi	Narrative feature	1992	2011	
El Norte	Narrative feature	1983	1995	
Electronic Labyrinth: THX 1138 4EB	Short subject	1967	2010	
Ella Cinders	Narrative feature	1926	2013	
Emigrants Landing at Ellis Island	Documentary/short subject	1903	2019	
The Emperor Jones	Narrative feature	1933	1999	
Empire	Experimental film	1964	2004	
The Empire Strikes Back	Narrative feature	1980	2010	
Employees' Entrance	Narrative feature	1933	2019	
The Endless Summer	Documentary	1966	2002	
Enter the Dragon	Narrative feature	1973	2004	
Eraserhead	Narrative feature	1977	2004	
Eve's Bayou	Narrative feature	1997	2018	
Evergreen	Short subject/experimental film	1965	2021	
The Evidence of the Film	Short subject	1913	2001	
The Exiles	Narrative feature	1961	2009	
The Exorcist	Narrative feature	1973	2010	
The Exploits of Elaine (Note: A serial of fourteen short films)	Short subject/serial film	1914	1994	
A Face in the Crowd	Narrative feature	1957	2008	
Faces	Narrative feature	1968	2011	
Fake Fruit Factory	Documentary/short subject/experimental film	1986	2011	
The Fall of the House of Usher	Short subject	1928	2000	
Fame	Narrative feature	1980	2023	
Fantasia	Animated narrative feature	1940	1990	
Fargo	Narrative feature	1996	2006	
Fast Times at Ridgemont High	Narrative feature	1982	2005	
Fatty's Tintype Tangle	Short subject	1915	1995	
Felicia	Documentary/short subject	1965	2014	
Ferris Bueller's Day Off	Narrative feature	1986	2014	
Field of Dreams	Narrative feature	1989	2017	
Film Portrait	Documentary	1972	2003	
Five Easy Pieces	Narrative feature	1970	2000	
Flash Gordon (Note: A serial of thirteen short films)	Short subject/serial film	1936	1996	
Flesh and the Devil	Narrative feature	1926	2006	
Flowers and Trees	Animated short subject	1932	2021	
Flower Drum Song	Narrative feature	1961	2008	
The Flying Ace	Narrative feature	1926	2021	
The Fog of War	Documentary	2003	2019	
A Fool There Was	Narrative feature	1915	2015	
Foolish Wives	Narrative feature	1922	2008	
Footlight Parade	Narrative feature	1933	1992	
Forbidden Planet	Narrative feature	1956	2013	
Force of Evil	Narrative feature	1948	1994	
The Forgotten Frontier	Documentary	1931	1996	
Forrest Gump	Narrative feature	1994	2011	
The Four Horsemen of the Apocalypse	Narrative feature	1921	1995	
Fox Movietone News: Jenkins Orphanage Band	Newsreel	1928	2003	
Frank Film	Animated short subject	1973	1996	
Frankenstein	Narrative feature	1931	1991	
Freaks	Narrative feature	1932	1994	
Free Radicals	Animated short subject	1979	2008	
Freedom Riders	Documentary	2010	2020	
The French Connection	Narrative feature	1971	2005	
The Freshman	Narrative feature	1925	1990	
Frida	Narrative feature	2002	2025	
From Here to Eternity	Narrative feature	1953	2002	
From Stump to Ship	Documentary/short subject/industrial film	1930	2002	
From the Manger to the Cross	Narrative feature	1912	1998	
The Front Page	Narrative feature	1931	2010	
Fuentes Family Home Movies Collection	Home films	1920s–1930s	2017	
Fuji	Short subject/experimental film (animated/live-action hybrid short)	1974	2002	
Funny Girl	Narrative feature	1968	2016	
Fury	Narrative feature	1936	1995	
The Gang's All Here	Narrative feature	1943	2014	
Ganja & Hess	Narrative feature	1973	2024	
Garlic Is as Good as Ten Mothers	Documentary	1980	2004	
Gaslight	Narrative feature	1944	2019	
The General	Narrative feature	1926	1989	
Gentleman's Agreement	Narrative feature	1947	2017	
George Stevens' World War II footage	Documentary	1943–1946	2008	
George Washington Carver at Tuskegee Institute	Documentary/short subject	1937	2019	
Gerald McBoing-Boing	Animated short subject	1950	1995	
Gertie the Dinosaur	Animated short subject	1914	1991	
Ghostbusters	Narrative feature	1984	2015	
Giant	Narrative feature	1956	2005	
Gigi	Narrative feature	1958	1991	
Gilda	Narrative feature	1946	2013	
The Girl Without a Soul	Narrative feature	1917	2018	
Girlfriends	Narrative feature	1978	2019	
Glimpse of the Garden	Short subject/experimental film	1957	2007	
Glory	Narrative feature	1989	2025	
The Godfather	Narrative feature	1972	1990	
The Godfather Part II	Narrative feature	1974	1993	
Going My Way	Narrative feature	1944	2004	
Gold Diggers of 1933	Narrative feature	1933	2003	
The Gold Rush	Narrative feature	1925	1992	
Gone with the Wind	Narrative feature	1939	1989	
Goodfellas	Narrative feature	1990	2000	
The Goonies	Narrative feature	1985	2017	
The Graduate	Narrative feature	1967	1996	
The Grand Budapest Hotel	Narrative feature	2014	2025	
Grand Hotel	Narrative feature	1932	2007	
The Grapes of Wrath	Narrative feature	1940	1989	
Grass	Documentary	1925	1997	
Grease	Narrative feature	1978	2020	
The Great Dictator	Narrative feature	1940	1997	
The Great Train Robbery	Short subject	1903	1990	
Greed	Narrative feature	1924	1991	
Grey Gardens	Documentary	1975	2010	
The Ground	Short subject/experimental film	1993–2001	2020	
Groundhog Day	Narrative feature	1993	2006	
Growing Up Female	Documentary	1971	2011	
Guess Who's Coming to Dinner	Narrative feature	1967	2017	
Gun Crazy	Narrative feature	1950	1998	
Gunga Din	Narrative feature	1939	1999	
H2O	Short subject/experimental film	1929	2005	
Hail the Conquering Hero	Narrative feature	1944	2015	
Hairspray	Narrative feature	1988	2022	
Hair Piece: A Film for Nappyheaded People	Animated short subject	1984	2018	
Hallelujah	Narrative feature	1929	2008	
Halloween	Narrative feature	1978	2006	
Hands Up!	Narrative feature	1926	2005	
Harlan County, USA	Documentary	1976	1990	
Harold and Maude	Narrative feature	1971	1997	
Hearts and Minds	Documentary	1974	2018	
He Who Gets Slapped	Narrative feature	1924	2017	
The Heiress	Narrative feature	1949	1996	
Helen Keller in Her Story	Documentary	1954	2023	
Hell's Hinges	Narrative feature	1916	1994	
Hell-Bound Train	Narrative feature	1930	2021	
Heroes All	Documentary	1920	2009	
Hester Street	Narrative feature	1975	2011	
High Noon	Narrative feature	1952	1989	
High School	Documentary	1968	1991	
High Society	Narrative feature	1956	2025	
Hindenburg disaster newsreel footage	Newsreel	1937	1997	
His Girl Friday	Narrative feature	1940	1993	
The Hitch-Hiker	Narrative feature	1953	1998	
The Hole	Animated short subject	1962	2013	
Home Alone	Narrative feature	1990	2023	
Hoop Dreams	Documentary	1994	2005	
Hoosiers	Narrative feature	1986	2001	
Hospital	Documentary	1970	1994	
The Hospital	Narrative feature	1971	1995	
Hot Dogs for Gauguin	Short subject	1972	2009	
The Hours	Narrative feature	2002	2025	
Hours for Jerome: Parts 1 and 2	Experimental film	1980–1982	2012	
The House I Live In	Short subject	1945	2007	
The House in the Middle	Documentary/short subject	1954	2001	
House of Usher	Narrative feature	1960	2005	
House of Wax	Narrative feature	1953	2014	
House Party	Narrative feature	1990	2022	
How Green Was My Valley	Narrative feature	1941	1990	
How the West Was Won	Narrative feature	1962	1997	
Hud	Narrative feature	1963	2018	
Humoresque	Narrative feature	1920	2015	
The Hunters	Documentary	1957	2003	
The Hurt Locker	Narrative feature	2008	2020	
The Hustler	Narrative feature	1961	1997	
I Am a Fugitive from a Chain Gang	Narrative feature	1932	1991	
I Am Joaquin	Short subject	1969	2010	
I Am Somebody	Documentary/short subject	1970	2019	
I, An Actress	Short subject	1977	2011	
Illusions	Short subject	1982	2020	
Imitation of Life	Narrative feature	1934	2005	
Imitation of Life	Narrative feature	1959	2015	
The Immigrant	Short subject	1917	1998	
In a Lonely Place	Narrative feature	1950	2007	
In Cold Blood	Narrative feature	1967	2008	
In the Heat of the Night	Narrative feature	1967	2002	
In the Land of the Head Hunters	Narrative feature	1914	1999	
In the Street	Documentary/short subject	1948	2006	
Inception	Narrative feature	2010	2025	
The Incredible Shrinking Man	Narrative feature	1957	2009	
The Incredibles	Animated narrative feature	2004	2025	
The Informer	Narrative feature	1935	2018	
The Inner World of Aphasia	Short subject/educational film	1968	2015	
Interior New York Subway, 14th Street to 42nd Street	Documentary/short subject	1905	2017	
Into the Arms of Strangers: Stories of the Kindertransport	Documentary	2000	2014	
Intolerance	Narrative feature	1916	1989	
Invaders from Mars	Narrative feature	1953	2024	
Invasion of the Body Snatchers	Narrative feature	1956	1994	
The Invisible Man	Narrative feature	1933	2008	
The Iron Horse	Narrative feature	1924	2011	
Iron Man	Narrative feature	2008	2022	
It	Narrative feature	1927	2001	
It Happened One Night	Narrative feature	1934	1993	
It's a Gift	Narrative feature	1934	2010	
It's a Wonderful Life	Narrative feature	1946	1990	
The Italian	Narrative feature	1915	1991	
Itam Hakim, Hopiit	Documentary/experimental film	1984	2022	
Jailhouse Rock	Narrative feature	1957	2004	
Jam Session	Short subject	1942	2001	
Jammin' the Blues	Short subject	1944	1995	
Jaws	Narrative feature	1975	2001	
Jazz on a Summer's Day	Documentary	1959	1999	
The Jazz Singer	Narrative feature	1927	1996	
Jeffries-Johnson World's Championship Boxing Contest	Documentary	1910	2005	
Jezebel	Narrative feature	1938	2009	
John Henry and the Inky-Poo	Animated short subject	1946	2015	
Johnny Guitar	Narrative feature	1954	2008	
The Joy Luck Club	Narrative feature	1993	2020	
Jubilo	Narrative feature	1919	2021	
Judgment at Nuremberg	Narrative feature	1961	2013	
The Jungle	Short subject	1967	2009	
Jurassic Park	Narrative feature	1993	2018	
Kannapolis, N.C.	Documentary	1941	2004	
The Karate Kid	Narrative feature	1984	2025	
The Kid	Narrative feature	1921	2011	
Kid Auto Races at Venice	Short subject	1914	2020	
The Kidnappers Foil (Note: Remade at least 25 times; the NFR entry encompasses all versions)	Short subject	1930s–1950s	2012	
Killer of Sheep	Narrative feature	1978	1990	
The Killers	Narrative feature	1946	2008	
King: A Filmed Record... Montgomery to Memphis	Documentary	1970	1999	
King Kong	Narrative feature	1933	1991	
King of Jazz	Narrative feature	1930	2013	
The Kiss	Short subject	1896	1999	
Kiss Me Deadly	Narrative feature	1955	1999	
Knute Rockne, All American	Narrative feature	1940	1997	
Koko's Earth Control	Animated short subject	1928	2024	
Koyaanisqatsi	Documentary	1982	2000	
L.A. Confidential	Narrative feature	1997	2015	
La Bamba	Narrative feature	1987	2017	
The Lady	Narrative feature	1925	2025	
Lady and the Tramp	Animated narrative feature	1955	2023	
The Lady Eve	Narrative feature	1941	1994	
The Lady from Shanghai	Narrative feature	1947	2018	
Lady Helen's Escapade	Short subject	1909	2004	
Lady Windermere's Fan	Narrative feature	1925	2002	
Lambchops	Short subject	1929	1999	
The Land Beyond the Sunset	Short subject	1912	2000	
Lassie Come Home	Narrative feature	1943	1993	
The Last Command	Narrative feature	1928	2006	
The Last of the Mohicans	Narrative feature	1920	1995	
The Last Picture Show	Narrative feature	1971	1998	
The Last Waltz	Documentary	1978	2019	
Laura	Narrative feature	1944	1999	
Lawrence of Arabia	Narrative feature	1962	1991	
The Lead Shoes	Short subject/experimental film	1949	2009	
A League of Their Own	Narrative feature	1992	2012	
The Learning Tree	Narrative feature	1969	1989	
Leave Her to Heaven	Narrative feature	1945	2018	
Let There Be Light	Documentary	1946	2010	
Let's All Go to the Lobby	Animated short subject	1957	2000	
Letter from an Unknown Woman	Narrative feature	1948	1992	
The Life and Death of 9413: a Hollywood Extra	Short subject/experimental film	1928	1997	
The Life and Times of Rosie the Riveter	Documentary	1980	1996	
Life of an American Fireman	Short subject	1903	2016	
The Life of Emile Zola	Narrative feature	1937	2000	
The Lighted Field	Experimental film	1987	2023	
Lilies of the Field	Narrative feature	1963	2020	
The Lion King	Animated narrative feature	1994	2016	
Little Big Man	Narrative feature	1970	2014	
Little Caesar	Narrative feature	1931	2000	
Little Fugitive	Narrative feature	1953	1997	
The Little Mermaid	Animated narrative feature	1989	2022	
Little Miss Marker	Narrative feature	1934	1998	
Little Nemo	Animated short subject	1911	2009	
Lives of Performers	Experimental film	1972	2017	
The Living Desert	Documentary	1953	2000	
Lonesome	Narrative feature	1928	2010	
The Long Goodbye	Narrative feature	1973	2021	
The Lord of the Rings: The Fellowship of the Ring	Narrative feature	2001	2021	
Losing Ground	Narrative feature	1982	2020	
Lost Horizon	Narrative feature	1937	2016	
The Lost Weekend	Narrative feature	1945	2011	
The Lost World	Narrative feature	1925	1998	
Louisiana Story	Narrative feature	1948	1994	
Love & Basketball	Narrative feature	2000	2023	
Love Finds Andy Hardy	Narrative feature	1938	2000	
Love Me Tonight	Narrative feature	1932	1990	
The Loving Story	Documentary	2011	2025	
The Lunch Date	Short subject	1989	2013	
Luxo Jr.	Animated short subject	1986	2014	
M*A*S*H	Narrative feature	1970	1996	
Mabel's Blunder	Short subject	1914	2009	
Magical Maestro	Animated short subject	1952	1993	
The Magnificent Ambersons	Narrative feature	1942	1991	
The Magnificent Seven	Narrative feature	1960	2013	
The Maid of McMillan	Short subject	1916	2025	
Make Way for Tomorrow	Narrative feature	1937	2010	
The Making of an American	Short subject/educational film	1920	2005	
Malcolm X	Narrative feature	1992	2010	
The Maltese Falcon	Narrative feature	1941	1989	
The Man Who Shot Liberty Valance	Narrative feature	1962	2007	
The Man with the Golden Arm	Narrative feature	1955	2020	
The Manchurian Candidate	Narrative feature	1962	1994	
Manhatta	Documentary/short subject	1921	1995	
Manhattan	Narrative feature	1979	2001	
Manzanar	Documentary/short subject	1971	2022	
Mardi Gras Carnival	Documentary/short subject	1898	2022	
The March	Documentary/short subject	1964	2008	
The March of Time: Inside Nazi Germany	Newsreel	1938	1993	
Marian Anderson: The Lincoln Memorial Concert	Newsreel	1939	2001	
The Mark of Zorro	Narrative feature	1920	2015	
The Mark of Zorro	Narrative feature	1940	2009	
Martha Graham dance films (Note: Heretic, Frontier, Lamentation, and Appalachian Spring)	Short subject	1931–1944	2013	
Marty	Narrative feature	1955	1994	
Mary Poppins	Narrative feature	1964	2013	
Master Hands	Documentary/short subject	1936	1999	
Matewan	Narrative feature	1987	2023	
Matrimony's Speed Limit	Short subject	1913	2003	
The Matrix	Narrative feature	1999	2012	
Mauna Kea: Temple Under Siege	Documentary	2006	2020	
Maya Lin: A Strong Clear Vision	Documentary	1994	2023	
McCabe & Mrs. Miller	Narrative feature	1971	2010	
Mean Streets	Narrative feature	1973	1997	
Medium Cool	Narrative feature	1969	2003	
Meet Me in St. Louis	Narrative feature	1944	1994	
Melody Ranch	Narrative feature	1940	2002	
Memento	Narrative feature	2000	2017	
Memphis Belle	Documentary	1944	2001	
Men and Dust	Documentary/short subject	1940	2013	
Meshes of the Afternoon	Short subject/experimental film	1943	1990	
Michael Jackson's Thriller±	Short subject/music video	1983	2009	
The Middleton Family at the New York World's Fair	Narrative feature/industrial film	1939	2012	
Midnight	Narrative feature	1939	2013	
Midnight Cowboy	Narrative feature	1969	1994	
Mighty Like a Moose	Short subject	1926	2007	
Mildred Pierce	Narrative feature	1945	1996	
Mingus	Documentary	1968	2022	
The Miracle of Morgan's Creek	Narrative feature	1944	2001	
Miracle on 34th Street	Narrative feature	1947	2005	
The Miracle Worker	Narrative feature	1962	2024	
Miss Lulu Bett	Narrative feature	1921	2001	
Modern Times	Narrative feature	1936	1989	
Modesta	Short subject	1956	1998	
Mom and Dad	Narrative feature	1945	2005	
Monterey Pop	Documentary	1968	2018	
Moon Breath Beat	Animated short subject	1980	2014	
Morocco	Narrative feature	1930	1992	
Motion Painting No. 1	Animated short subject/experimental film	1947	1997	
A Movie	Short subject/experimental film	1958	1994	
A Movie Trip Through Filmland	Short subject/educational film	1921	2023	
Mr. Smith Goes to Washington	Narrative feature	1939	1989	
Mrs. Miniver	Narrative feature	1942	2009	
Multiple SIDosis	Short subject	1970	2000	
The Muppet Movie±	Narrative feature	1979	2009	
The Murder of Fred Hampton	Documentary	1971	2021	
The Music Box	Short subject	1932	1997	
The Music Man	Narrative feature	1962	2005	
The Musketeers of Pig Alley	Short subject	1912	2016	
My Darling Clementine	Narrative feature	1946	1991	
My Fair Lady	Narrative feature	1964	2018	
My Family	Narrative feature	1995	2024	
My Man Godfrey	Narrative feature	1936	1999	
My Name Is Oona	Short subject/experimental film	1969	2019	
My Own Private Idaho	Narrative feature	1991	2024	
The Naked City	Narrative feature	1948	2007	
The Naked Spur	Narrative feature	1953	1997	
Nanook of the North	Documentary	1922	1989	
Nashville	Narrative feature	1975	1992	
National Lampoon's Animal House	Narrative feature	1978	2001	
National Velvet	Narrative feature	1944	2003	
Naughty Marietta	Narrative feature	1935	2003	
Navajo Film Themselves (Note: A series of seven short films)	Documentary/short subject	1966	2002	
The Navigator	Narrative feature	1924	2018	
The Negro Soldier	Documentary	1944	2011	
Network	Narrative feature	1976	2000	
A New Leaf	Narrative feature	1971	2019	
Newark Athlete	Short subject	1891	2010	
Nicholas Brothers' home movies	Home films	1930s–1940s	2011	
A Night at the Opera	Narrative feature	1935	1993	
The Night of the Hunter	Narrative feature	1955	1992	
Night of the Living Dead	Narrative feature	1968	1999	
A Nightmare on Elm Street	Narrative feature	1984	2021	
The Nightmare Before Christmas	Animated narrative feature	1993	2023	
Ninotchka	Narrative feature	1939	1990	
No Country for Old Men	Narrative feature	2007	2024	
No Lies	Short subject	1973	2008	
Norma Rae	Narrative feature	1979	2011	
North by Northwest	Narrative feature	1959	1995	
(nostalgia)	Documentary/short subject/experimental film	1971	2003	
Notes on the Port of St. Francis	Documentary/short subject	1951	2013	
Nothing but a Man	Narrative feature	1964	1993	
Notorious	Narrative feature	1946	2006	
Now, Voyager	Narrative feature	1942	2007	
The Nutty Professor	Narrative feature	1963	2004	
The Oath of the Sword	Short subject	1914	2025	
OffOn	Short subject/experimental film	1968	2004	
Oklahoma!	Narrative feature	1955	2007	
The Old Mill	Animated short subject	1937	2015	
Old Yeller	Narrative feature	1957	2019	
On the Bowery	Documentary	1957	2008	
On the Town	Narrative feature	1949	2018	
On the Waterfront	Narrative feature	1954	1989	
Once Upon a Time in the West	Narrative feature	1968	2009	
One-Eyed Jacks	Narrative feature	1961	2018	
One Flew Over the Cuckoo's Nest	Narrative feature	1975	1993	
One Froggy Evening	Animated short subject	1955	2003	
One Survivor Remembers	Documentary/short subject	1995	2012	
One Week	Short subject	1920	2008	
Only Angels Have Wings	Narrative feature	1939	2017	
Our Daily Bread	Narrative feature	1934	2015	
Our Day	Documentary/short subject/home film	1938	2007	
Our Lady of the Sphere	Short subject/experimental film	1969	2010	
Out of the Past	Narrative feature	1947	1991	
The Outlaw Josey Wales	Narrative feature	1976	1996	
Outrage	Narrative feature	1950	2020	
The Ox-Bow Incident	Narrative feature	1943	1998	
Parable	Short subject	1964	2012	
Pariah	Narrative feature	2011	2022	
Paris Is Burning	Documentary	1990	2016	
Pass the Gravy	Short subject	1928	1998	
Passing Through	Narrative feature	1977	2023	
Paths of Glory	Narrative feature	1957	1992	
Patton	Narrative feature	1970	2003	
The Pawnbroker	Narrative feature	1964	2008	
The Pearl	Narrative feature	1947	2002	
Peege	Short subject	1973	2007	
The Perils of Pauline (Note: A serial of twenty short films)	Short subject/serial film	1914	2008	
Peter Pan	Narrative feature	1924	2000	
The Phantom of the Opera	Narrative feature	1925	1998	
The Phenix City Story	Narrative feature	1955	2019	
Philadelphia	Narrative feature	1993	2025	
The Philadelphia Story	Narrative feature	1940	1995	
Pickup on South Street	Narrative feature	1953	2018	
Pillow Talk	Narrative feature	1959	2009	
Pink Flamingos	Narrative feature	1972	2021	
The Pink Panther	Narrative feature	1963	2010	
Pinocchio±	Animated narrative feature	1940	1994	
A Place in the Sun	Narrative feature	1951	1991	
Planet of the Apes	Narrative feature	1968	2001	
Platoon	Narrative feature	1986	2019	
Please, Don't Bury Me Alive!	Narrative feature	1976	2014	
The Plow That Broke the Plains	Documentary/short subject	1936	1999	
Point Blank	Narrative feature	1967	2016	
Point of Order	Documentary	1964	1993	
The Poor Little Rich Girl	Narrative feature	1917	1991	
Popeye the Sailor Meets Sindbad the Sailor	Animated short subject	1936	2004	
Porgy and Bess	Narrative feature	1959	2011	
Porky in Wackyland	Animated short subject	1938	2000	
Portrait of Jason	Documentary	1967	2015	
The Power and the Glory	Narrative feature	1933	2014	
The Power of the Press	Narrative feature	1928	2005	
Powers of Ten	Documentary/short subject	1977	1998	
Powwow Highway	Narrative feature	1989	2024	
Precious Images	Short subject/compilation	1986	2009	
Preservation of the Sign Language	Documentary/short subject	1913	2010	
President McKinley Inauguration Footage	Documentary/short subject	1901	2000	
The Pride of the Yankees	Narrative feature	1942	2024	
Primary	Documentary	1960	1990	
The Princess Bride	Narrative feature	1987	2016	
Princess Nicotine; or, The Smoke Fairy	Short subject	1909	2003	
The Prisoner of Zenda	Narrative feature	1937	1991	
The Producers	Narrative feature	1967	1996	
Psycho	Narrative feature	1960	1992	
The Public Enemy	Narrative feature	1931	1998	
Pull My Daisy	Short subject	1959	1996	
Pulp Fiction	Narrative feature	1994	2013	
Punch Drunks	Short subject	1934	2002	
Pups Is Pups	Short subject	1930	2004	
Purple Rain±	Narrative feature	1984	2019	
Putney Swope	Narrative feature	1969	2016	
Quasi at the Quackadero	Animated short subject	1975	2009	
Queen of Diamonds	Narrative feature	1991	2023	
The Quiet Man	Narrative feature	1952	2013	
Raging Bull	Narrative feature	1980	1990	
Raiders of the Lost Ark	Narrative feature	1981	1999	
A Raisin in the Sun	Narrative feature	1961	2005	
Real Women Have Curves	Narrative feature	2002	2019	
Rear Window	Narrative feature	1954	1997	
Rebecca	Narrative feature	1940	2018	
Rebel Without a Cause	Narrative feature	1955	1990	
The Red Book	Animated short subject	1994	2009	
Red Dust	Narrative feature	1932	2006	
Red River	Narrative feature	1948	1990	
Regeneration	Narrative feature	1915	2000	
Reminiscences of a Journey to Lithuania	Documentary/home film	1971–1972	2006	
Republic Steel Strike Riot Newsreel Footage	Newsreel	1937	1997	
Requiem-29	Documentary/short subject	1970	2021	
Return of the Jedi	Narrative feature	1983	2021	
Return of the Secaucus 7	Narrative feature	1980	1997	
The Revenge of Pancho Villa	Narrative feature/compilation	1930–1936	2009	
Reverend Solomon Sir Jones films	Home films	1924–1928	2016	
Richard Pryor: Live in Concert	Documentary	1979	2021	
Ride the High Country	Narrative feature	1962	1992	
The Right Stuff	Narrative feature	1983	2013	
Ringling Brothers Parade Film	Documentary/short subject	1902	2021	
Rio Bravo	Narrative feature	1959	2014	
Rip Van Winkle (Note: A series of eight short films)	Short subject	1896	1995	
The River	Documentary/short subject	1938	1990	
Road to Morocco	Narrative feature	1942	1996	
Rocky	Narrative feature	1976	2006	
The Rocky Horror Picture Show	Narrative feature	1975	2005	
Roger & Me	Documentary	1989	2013	
Roman Holiday	Narrative feature	1953	1999	
Rose Hobart	Short subject/experimental film	1936	2001	
Rosemary's Baby	Narrative feature	1968	2014	
Ruggles of Red Gap	Narrative feature	1935	2014	
Rushmore	Narrative feature	1998	2016	
Sabrina	Narrative feature	1954	2002	
Safety Last!	Narrative feature	1923	1994	
Salesman	Documentary	1969	1992	
Salomé	Narrative feature	1923	2000	
Salt of the Earth	Narrative feature	1954	1992	
Samsara: Death and Rebirth in Cambodia	Documentary/short subject	1989	2012	
San Francisco Earthquake & Fire: April 18, 1906	Documentary/short subject	1906	2005	
Saturday Night Fever±	Narrative feature	1977	2010	
Saving Private Ryan	Narrative feature	1998	2014	
Say Amen, Somebody	Documentary	1982	2025	
Scarface	Narrative feature	1932	1994	
Schindler's List	Narrative feature	1993	2004	
Scorpio Rising	Short subject/experimental film	1964	2022	
Scratch and Crow	Animated short subject	1995	2009	
The Searchers	Narrative feature	1956	1989	
Seconds	Narrative feature	1966	2015	
Selena	Narrative feature	1997	2021	
Serene Velocity	Short subject/experimental film	1970	2001	
Sergeant York	Narrative feature	1941	2008	
Seven Brides for Seven Brothers	Narrative feature	1954	2004	
Seventh Heaven	Narrative feature	1927	1995	
Sex, Lies, and Videotape	Narrative feature	1989	2006	
The Sex Life of the Polyp	Short subject	1928	2007	
Shadow of a Doubt	Narrative feature	1943	1991	
Shadows	Narrative feature	1959	1993	
Shaft±	Narrative feature	1971	2000	
Shane	Narrative feature	1953	1993	
The Shawshank Redemption	Narrative feature	1994	2015	
She Done Him Wrong	Narrative feature	1933	1996	
She's Gotta Have It	Narrative feature	1986	2019	
Sherlock Jr.	Narrative feature	1924	1991	
Sherman's March	Documentary	1986	2000	
The Shining	Narrative feature	1980	2018	
Shock Corridor	Narrative feature	1963	1996	
Shoes	Narrative feature	1916	2014	
The Shop Around the Corner	Narrative feature	1940	1999	
Show Boat	Narrative feature	1936	1996	
Show People	Narrative feature	1928	2003	
Shrek	Animated narrative feature	2001	2020	
Siege	Documentary/short subject	1940	2006	
The Silence of the Lambs	Narrative feature	1991	2011	
Singin' in the Rain	Narrative feature	1952	1989	
Sink or Swim	Experimental film	1990	2015	
The Sinking of the Lusitania	Animated short subject	1918	2017	
Sky High	Narrative feature	1922	1998	
Slacker	Narrative feature	1990	2012	
Sleeping Beauty	Animated narrative feature	1959	2019	
Smoke Signals	Narrative feature	1998	2018	
Snow-White	Animated short subject	1933	1994	
Snow White and the Seven Dwarfs	Animated narrative feature	1937	1989	
So's Your Old Man	Narrative feature	1926	2008	
The Social Network	Narrative feature	2010	2024	
Some Like It Hot	Narrative feature	1959	1989	
Something Good – Negro Kiss	Short subject	1898	2018	
The Son of the Sheik	Narrative feature	1926	2003	
Sons of the Desert	Narrative feature	1933	2012	
The Sound of Music±	Narrative feature	1965	2001	
Sounder	Narrative feature	1972	2021	
Sparrows	Narrative feature	1926	2025	
Spartacus	Narrative feature	1960	2017	
The Spook Who Sat by the Door	Narrative feature	1973	2012	
Spy Kids	Narrative feature	2001	2024	
St. Louis Blues	Short subject	1929	2006	
Stagecoach	Narrative feature	1939	1995	
Stand and Deliver	Narrative feature	1988	2011	
A Star Is Born	Narrative feature	1954	2000	
Star Trek II: The Wrath of Khan	Narrative feature	1982	2024	
Star Wars±	Narrative feature	1977	1989	
Stark Love	Narrative feature	1927	2009	
State Fair	Narrative feature	1933	2014	
Steamboat Bill, Jr.	Narrative feature	1928	2016	
Steamboat Willie	Animated short subject	1928	1998	
The Sting	Narrative feature	1973	2005	
Stop Making Sense	Documentary	1984	2021	
Stormy Weather	Narrative feature	1943	2001	
The Story of G.I. Joe	Narrative feature	1945	2009	
The Story of Menstruation	Animated short subject	1946	2015	
Stranger Than Paradise	Narrative feature	1984	2002	
Strangers on a Train	Narrative feature	1951	2021	
A Streetcar Named Desire±	Narrative feature	1951	1999	
The Strong Man	Narrative feature	1926	2007	
A Study in Reds	Short subject	1932	2009	
Study of a River	Short subject/experimental film	1997	2010	
Sullivan's Travels	Narrative feature	1941	1990	
Sunrise	Narrative feature	1927	1989	
Sunset Boulevard	Narrative feature	1950	1989	
Super Fly±	Narrative feature	1972	2022	
Superman	Narrative feature	1978	2017	
Suspense	Short subject	1913	2020	
Suzanne, Suzanne	Documentary/short subject	1982	2016	
Sweet Smell of Success	Narrative feature	1957	1993	
Sweet Sweetback's Baadasssss Song	Narrative feature	1971	2020	
Swing Time	Narrative feature	1936	2004	
Symbiopsychotaxiplasm: Take One	Documentary/experimental film	1968	2015	
The T.A.M.I. Show	Documentary	1964	2006	
Tabu: A Story of the South Seas	Narrative feature	1931	1994	
Tacoma Narrows Bridge Collapse	Home film	1940	1998	
The Tall T	Narrative feature	1957	2000	
Tarantella	Short subject/experimental film	1940	2010	
Tarzan and His Mate	Narrative feature	1934	2003	
Taxi Driver	Narrative feature	1976	1994	
The Tell-Tale Heart	Animated short subject	1953	2001	
The Ten Commandments	Narrative feature	1956	1999	
Ten Nights in a Barroom	Narrative feature	1926	2025	
The Terminator	Narrative feature	1984	2008	
Terminator 2: Judgment Day	Narrative feature	1991	2023	
Tess of the Storm Country	Narrative feature	1914	2006	
Tevya	Narrative feature	1939	1991	
The Texas Chain Saw Massacre	Narrative feature	1974	2024	
Thelma & Louise	Narrative feature	1991	2016	
Thelonious Monk: Straight, No Chaser	Documentary	1988	2017	
Theodore Case Sound Test: Gus Visser and His Singing Duck	Short subject/experimental film	1925	2002	
There It Is	Short subject	1928	2004	
They Call It Pro Football	Documentary	1967	2012	
The Thief of Bagdad	Narrative feature	1924	1996	
The Thin Blue Line	Documentary	1988	2001	
The Thin Man	Narrative feature	1934	1997	
The Thing	Narrative feature	1982	2025	
The Thing from Another World	Narrative feature	1951	2001	
Think of Me First as a Person	Home film	1960–1975	2006	
This Is Cinerama	Documentary	1952	2002	
This Is Spinal Tap	Narrative feature	1984	2002	
Three Little Pigs	Animated short subject	1933	2007	
Time and Dreams	Documentary	1976	2017	
A Time for Burning	Documentary	1966	2005	
A Time Out of War	Short subject	1954	2006	
The Times of Harvey Milk	Documentary	1984	2012	
Tin Toy	Animated short subject	1988	2003	
Titanic±	Narrative feature	1997	2017	
Titicut Follies	Documentary	1967	2022	
To Be or Not to Be	Narrative feature	1942	1996	
To Fly!	Documentary/short subject	1976	1995	
To Kill a Mockingbird	Narrative feature	1962	1995	
To Sleep with Anger	Narrative feature	1990	2017	
Tol'able David	Narrative feature	1921	2007	
Tom, Tom, the Piper's Son	Experimental film	1969–1971	2007	
Tongues Untied	Documentary/experimental film	1989	2022	
Tootsie	Narrative feature	1982	1998	
Top Gun	Narrative feature	1986	2015	
Top Hat	Narrative feature	1935	1990	
Topaz	Home film	1943–1945	1996	
Touch of Evil	Narrative feature	1958	1993	
Toy Story	Animated narrative feature	1995	2005	
Traffic in Souls	Narrative feature	1913	2006	
The Tramp and the Dog	Short subject	1896	2025	
Trance and Dance in Bali	Documentary/short subject	1936–1939 (Note: Not released until 1952)	1999	
The Treasure of the Sierra Madre	Narrative feature	1948	1990	
A Tree Grows in Brooklyn	Narrative feature	1945	2010	
A Trip Down Market Street	Documentary/short subject	1906	2010	
Trouble in Paradise	Narrative feature	1932	1991	
The Truman Show	Narrative feature	1998	2025	
Tulips Shall Grow	Animated short subject	1942	1997	
Twelve O'Clock High	Narrative feature	1949	1998	
Twentieth Century	Narrative feature	1934	2011	
Two-Color Kodachrome Test Shots No. III	Short subject/experimental film	1922	2012	
Two-Lane Blacktop	Narrative feature	1971	2012	
Uncle Tom's Cabin	Narrative feature	1914	2012	
Under Western Stars	Narrative feature	1938	2009	
Unforgiven	Narrative feature	1992	2004	
Union Maids	Documentary	1976	2022	
Unmasked	Short subject	1917	2014	
Up in Smoke	Narrative feature	1978	2024	
Uptown Saturday Night	Narrative feature	1974	2024	
V-E +1	Documentary/short subject	1945	2014	
Verbena Tragica	Narrative feature	1939	1996	
Vertigo	Narrative feature	1958	1989	
A Virtuous Vamp	Narrative feature	1919	2013	
A Walk in the Sun	Narrative feature	1945	2016	
WALL-E	Animated narrative feature	2008	2021	
Wanda	Narrative feature	1970	2017	
The War of the Worlds	Narrative feature	1953	2011	
Water and Power	Documentary/experimental film	1989	2008	
The Watermelon Woman	Narrative feature	1996	2021	
Wattstax	Documentary	1973	2020	
The Way of Peace	Animated short subject	1947	2014	
The Wedding Banquet	Narrative feature	1993	2023	
The Wedding March	Narrative feature	1928	2003	
We're Alive	Documentary/short subject	1974	2023	
West Side Story	Narrative feature	1961	1997	
Westinghouse Works, 1904 (Note: A collection of twenty-one short films)	Industrial film	1904	1998	
What Ever Happened to Baby Jane?	Narrative feature	1962	2021	
What's Opera, Doc?	Animated short subject	1957	1992	
When Harry Met Sally...	Narrative feature	1989	2022	
Where Are My Children?	Narrative feature	1916	1993	
White Fawn's Devotion	Short subject	1910	2008	
White Christmas	Narrative feature	1954	2025	
White Heat	Narrative feature	1949	2003	
Who Framed Roger Rabbit	Narrative feature (animated/live-action hybrid)	1988	2016	
Who Killed Vincent Chin?	Documentary	1987	2021	
Who's Afraid of Virginia Woolf?	Narrative feature	1966	2013	
Why Man Creates	Documentary/short subject/animated	1968	2002	
Why We Fight (Note: A series of seven feature films)	Documentary/propaganda film series	1943–1945	2000	
Wild and Woolly	Narrative feature	1917	2002	
Wild Boys of the Road	Narrative feature	1933	2013	
The Wild Bunch	Narrative feature	1969	1999	
Wild River	Narrative feature	1960	2002	
Will	Narrative feature	1981	2024	
Will Success Spoil Rock Hunter?	Narrative feature	1957	2000	
Willy Wonka & the Chocolate Factory	Narrative feature	1971	2014	
Winchester '73	Narrative feature	1950	2015	
The Wind	Narrative feature	1928	1993	
Wings	Narrative feature	1927	1997	
The Wishing Ring: An Idyll of Old England	Narrative feature	1914	2012	
With Car and Camera Around the World	Documentary	1929	2020	
With the Abraham Lincoln Brigade in Spain	Documentary	1937–1938	2017	
Within Our Gates	Narrative feature	1920	1992	
The Wizard of Oz±	Narrative feature	1939	1989	
The Wobblies	Documentary	1979	2021	
Woman of the Year	Narrative feature	1942	1999	
A Woman Under the Influence	Narrative feature	1974	1990	
The Women	Narrative feature	1939	2007	
Woodstock	Documentary	1970	1996	
Word Is Out: Stories of Some of Our Lives	Documentary	1977	2022	
The Wrecking Crew	Documentary	2008	2025	
Wuthering Heights	Narrative feature	1939	2007	
Yankee Doodle Dandy	Narrative feature	1942	1993	
Young Frankenstein	Narrative feature	1974	2003	
Young Mr. Lincoln	Narrative feature	1939	2003	
Zapruder film	Home film	1963	1994	
Zoot Suit	Narrative feature	1981	2019	
Zora Lathan student films	Short subject	1975–1976	2024	

=== Notes ===
- ± Indicates that this film's soundtrack, or a piece recorded for it, is also a National Recording Registry inductee.

== Number of films ==
As of the 2025 induction there are 925 total films. For purposes of this list, multi-year serials are counted only once (as they are in the Registry) by year of completion.

=== By release year ===
Year of release	Number of films
1891	1
1893	1
1894	1
1895	1
1896	2
1897	1
1898	2
1901	2
1902	1
1903	4
1904	1
1905	1
1906	3
1908	1
1909	3
1910	2
1911	1
1912	5
1913	6
1914	11
1915	6
1916	7
1917	5
1918	3
1919	4
1920	8
1921	6
1922	5
1923	2
1924	8
1925	12
1926	11
1927	8
1928	19
1929	8
1930	8
1931	8
1932	10
1933	17
1934	9
1935	7
1936	11
1937	11
1938	10
1939	19
1940	19
1941	10
1942	13
1943	7
1944	11
1945	11
1946	10
1947	7
1948	8
1949	7
1950	12
1951	10
1952	6
1953	17
1954	12
1955	13
1956	9
1957	17
1958	5
1959	13
1960	7
1961	9
1962	11
1963	11
1964	12
1965	3
1966	8
1967	16
1968	15
1969	12
1970	12
1971	16
1972	12
1973	13
1974	13
1975	12
1976	12
1977	10
1978	10
1979	14
1980	12
1981	5
1982	14
1983	6
1984	15
1985	4
1986	9
1987	7
1988	8
1989	12
1990	9
1991	8
1992	5
1993	7
1994	9
1995	7
1996	2
1997	6
1998	5
1999	4
2000	4
2001	3
2002	4
2003	1
2004	2
2005	1
2006	1
2007	1
2008	5
2010	3
2011	2
2013	2
2014	1
Unknown	24

=== By release decade ===
Decade of release	Number of films
1890s	9
1900s	16
1910s	50
1920s	87
1930s	110
1940s	103
1950s	114
1960s	105
1970s	123
1980s	93
1990s	61
2000s	22
2010s	8
Unknown	24

=== Age of Registry selections ===
The oldest film in the registry, Newark Athlete, was released in 1891, while the most recent, The Grand Budapest Hotel, was released in 2014.

=== Time span from release to selection ===
Released in 1895 and 1896, and selected in December 2024 and January 2026, Annabelle Serpentine Dance and The Tramp and the Dog jointly experienced the longest wait, at 129 years each, while Raging Bull, released theatrically in New York City, Los Angeles and Toronto on November 14, 1980, and inducted in October 1990, holds the record for the shortest delay, having been inducted slightly shy of the 10-year minimum. Only eight other films have been inducted at the 10-year mark: Do the Right Thing, Goodfellas, Toy Story, Fargo, 13 Lakes, Freedom Riders, 12 Years a Slave and 20 Feet from Stardom.

== Franchises with multiple entries ==
While most film franchises have only one entry in the registry, some have two or more. These include sequels, remakes, or adaptations of the same source material. Other franchises were released as theatrical short films (animated and/or live action).

- Ben-Hur: Ben-Hur: A Tale of the Christ, Ben-Hur
- Betty Boop: Koko's Earth Control (Koko the Clown), Snow-White (Betty Boop/Koko the Clown), Who Framed Roger Rabbit (Betty/Koko)
- Cinderella: Ella Cinders, Cinderella
- The Crowd and its sequel Our Daily Bread
- Dracula: Dracula (English-language version), Dracula (Spanish-language version), Abbott and Costello Meet Frankenstein
- The Fall of the House of Usher: The Fall of the House of Usher, House of Usher
- Frankenstein: Frankenstein, Bride of Frankenstein, Abbott and Costello Meet Frankenstein, Young Frankenstein
- The Front Page: The Front Page, His Girl Friday
- The Godfather: The Godfather, The Godfather Part II
- Imitation of Life: Imitation of Life (1934), Imitation of Life (1959)
- Looney Tunes/Merrie Melodies: Porky in Wackyland (Porky Pig), Duck Amuck (Daffy Duck), One Froggy Evening (Michigan J. Frog), What's Opera, Doc? (Bugs Bunny), Who Framed Roger Rabbit (Bugs/Daffy/Porky/numerous characters)
- Mickey Mouse: Steamboat Willie, Fantasia, Who Framed Roger Rabbit (Donald Duck/Goofy/Mickey Mouse/numerous characters)
- The Philadelphia Story: The Philadelphia Story, High Society
- Philip Marlowe: The Big Sleep, The Long Goodbye
- Silly Symphonies: Flowers and Trees, Three Little Pigs, The Old Mill, Who Framed Roger Rabbit (numerous characters)
- Snow White: Snow-White (with Betty Boop), Snow White and the Seven Dwarfs, Who Framed Roger Rabbit (Snow White/Seven Dwarfs/Wicked Queen)
- Star Wars: Star Wars, The Empire Strikes Back, Return of the Jedi
- Terminator: The Terminator, Terminator 2: Judgment Day
- The Thing: The Thing from Another World, The Thing (1982)
- Zorro: The Mark of Zorro (1920), The Mark of Zorro (1940)

== Directors with multiple entries (two or more) ==
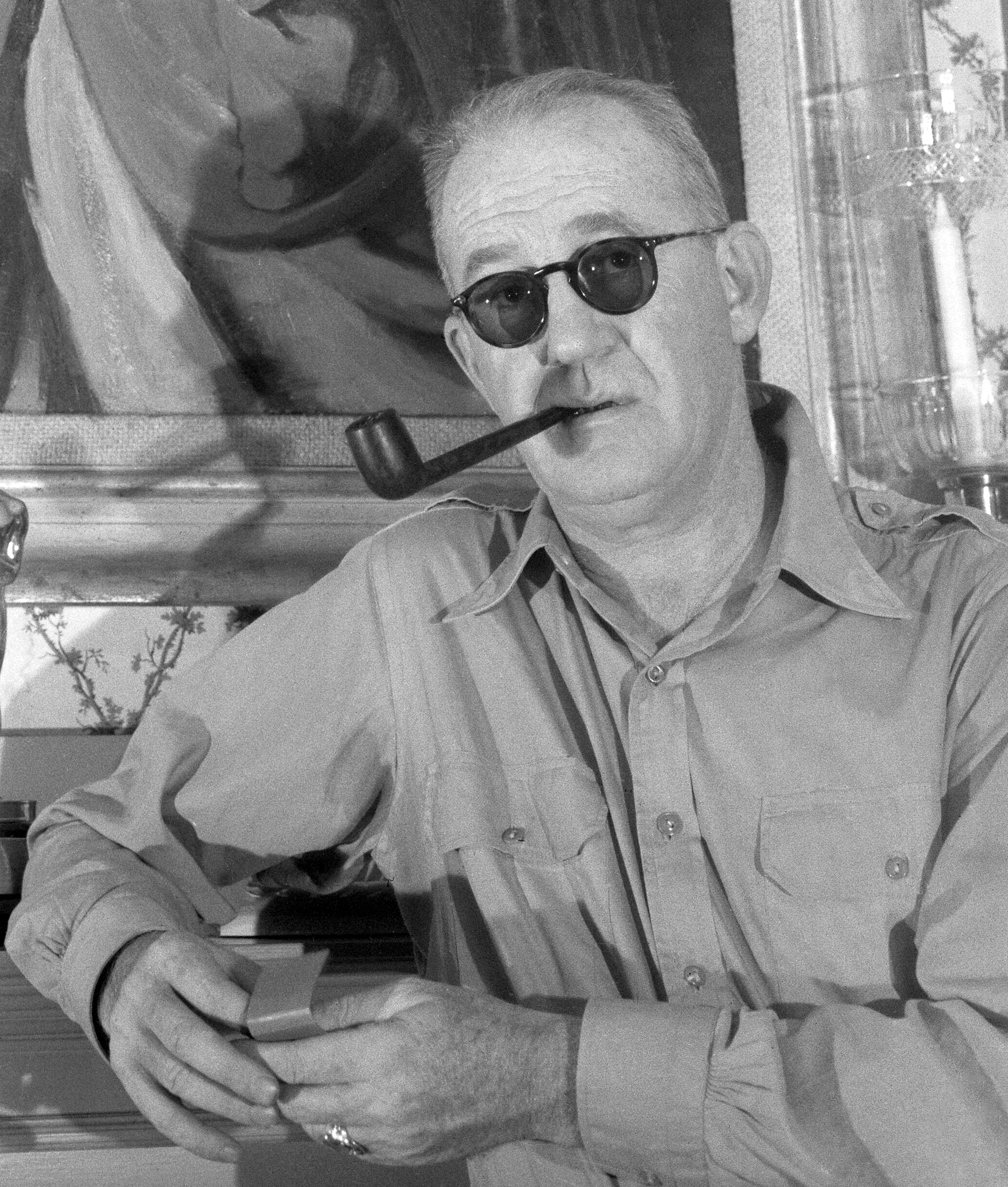
Academy Award–winning director John Ford has the most entries with 11 films.

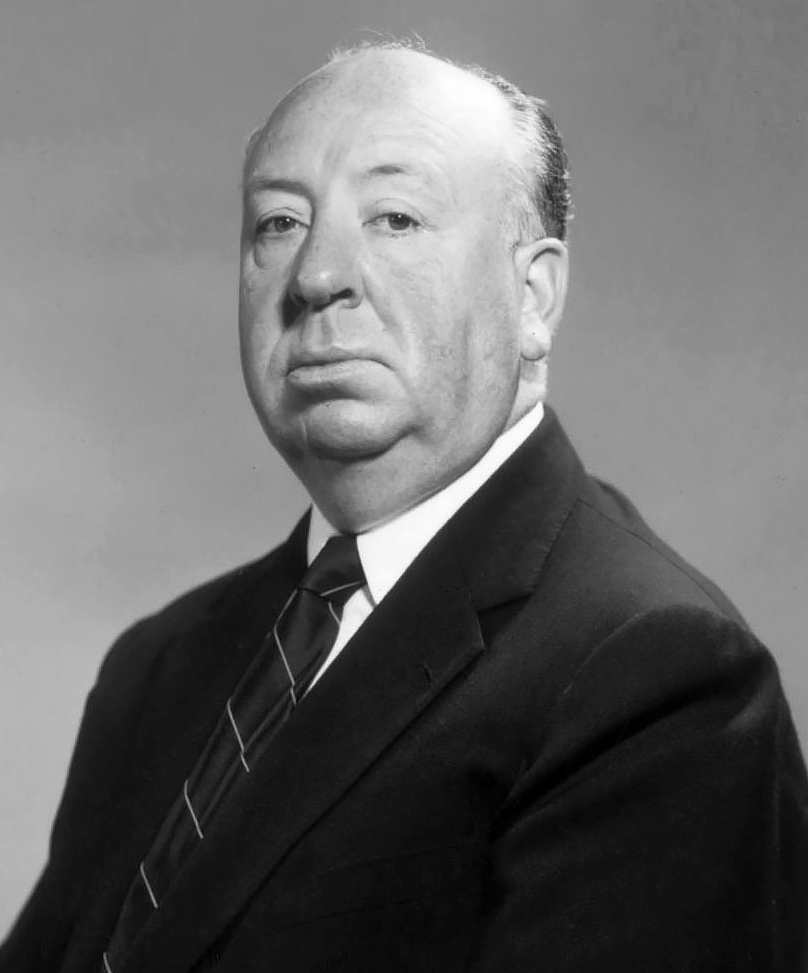
Master of Suspense Alfred Hitchcock, responsible for inductees ranging from the 1940 Academy Award for Best Picture winner Rebecca to 1963's The Birds

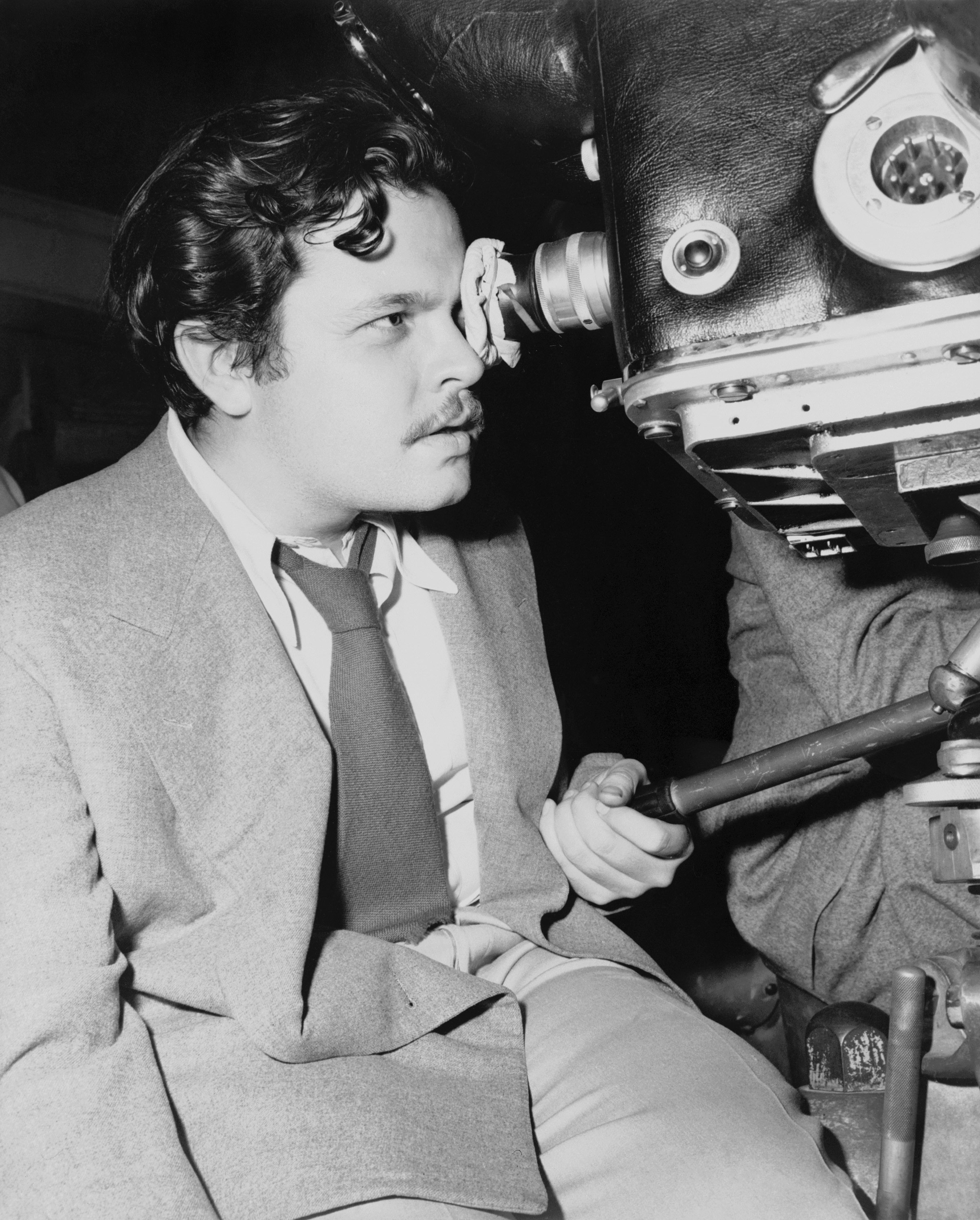
Orson Welles, acclaimed filmmaker behind inductees Citizen Kane (1941), The Magnificent Ambersons (1942), The Lady from Shanghai (1948) and Touch of Evil (1958)

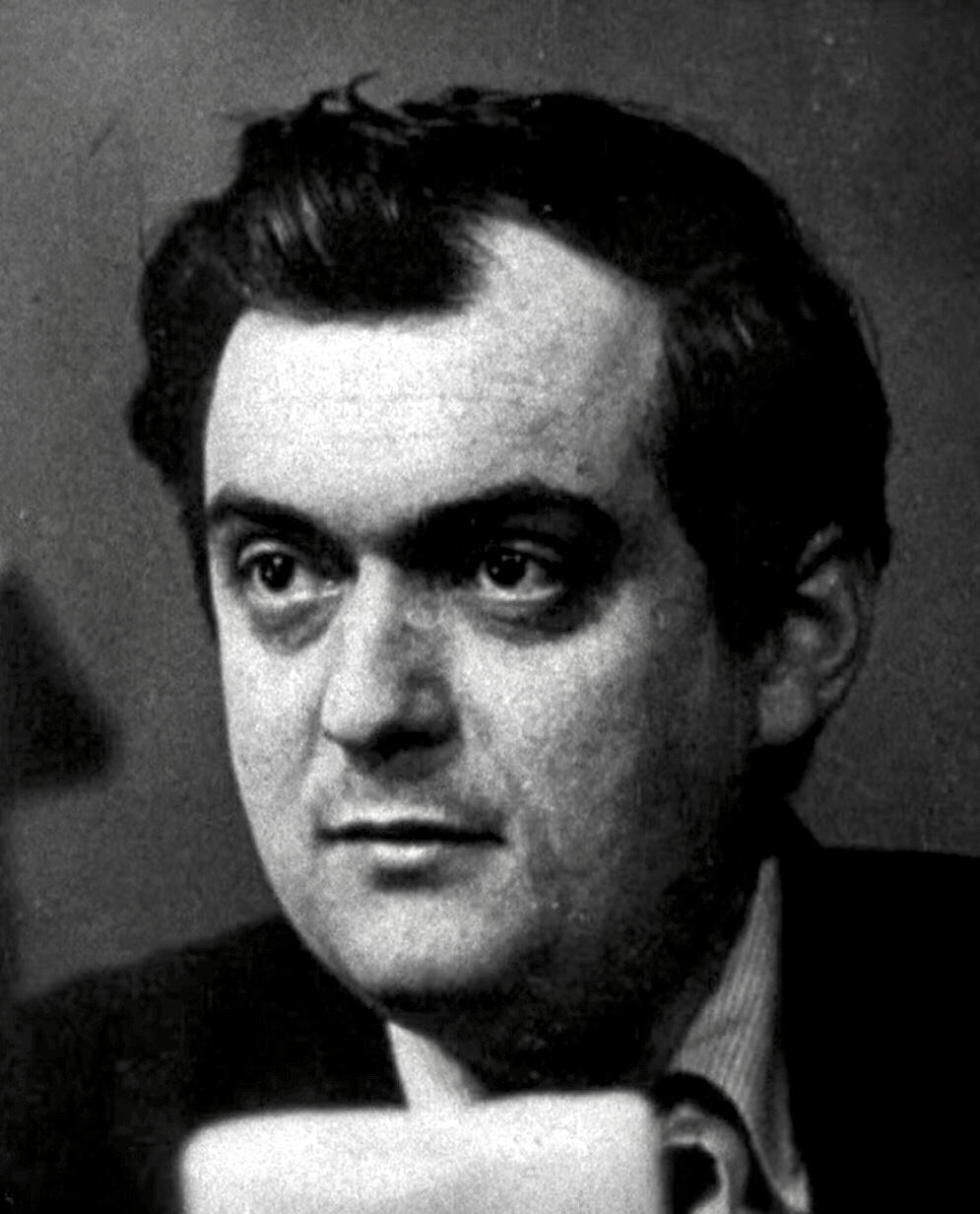
Stanley Kubrick, master auteur responsible for inductees ranging from 1957's Paths of Glory to his 1980 adaptation of Stephen King's The Shining

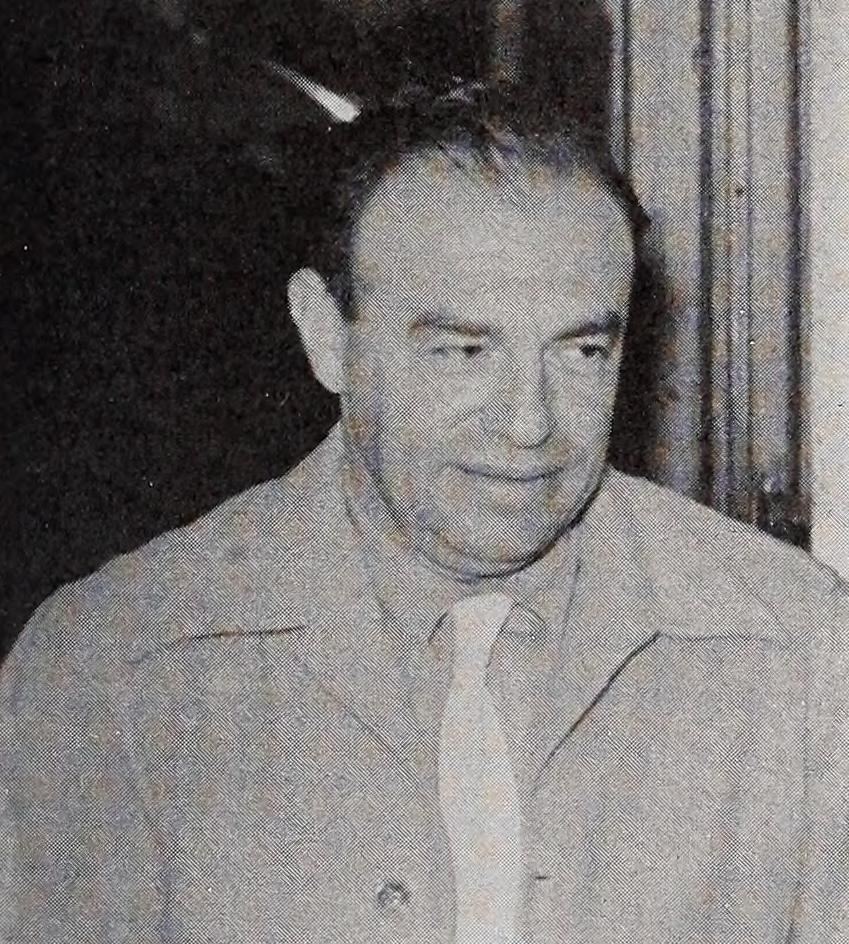
Aside from animated shorts/features by producer Walt Disney alongside multiple directors, animator Dave Fleischer has the most animated titles on the Registry with four (some featuring timeless characters Koko the Clown, Betty Boop and Popeye).

- 11
  - John Ford: The Iron Horse, The Informer, Stagecoach, Young Mr. Lincoln, The Grapes of Wrath, How Green Was My Valley, My Darling Clementine, The Quiet Man, The Searchers, The Man Who Shot Liberty Valance, How the West Was Won (segment)
- 10
  - George Cukor: Dinner at Eight, The Prisoner of Zenda (uncredited) Gone with the Wind (uncredited), The Women, The Philadelphia Story, Gaslight, Adam's Rib, Born Yesterday, A Star Is Born, My Fair Lady
  - Howard Hawks: Scarface, Twentieth Century, Bringing Up Baby, Only Angels Have Wings, His Girl Friday, Sergeant York, Ball of Fire, The Big Sleep, Red River, Rio Bravo (Note: The Thing from Another World has been disputed as having been directed by Hawks, which would put his total at 11.)
  - William Wyler: Dodsworth, Jezebel, Wuthering Heights, Mrs. Miniver, Memphis Belle, The Best Years of Our Lives, The Heiress, Roman Holiday, Ben-Hur, Funny Girl
- 9
  - Alfred Hitchcock: Rebecca, Shadow of a Doubt, Notorious, Strangers on a Train, Rear Window, Vertigo, North by Northwest, Psycho, The Birds
  - Leo McCarey: Mighty Like a Moose, Pass the Gravy (supervising director), The Battle of the Century, Big Business (supervising director), Duck Soup, Ruggles of Red Gap, Make Way for Tomorrow, The Awful Truth, Going My Way
- 8
  - Elia Kazan: A Tree Grows in Brooklyn, Gentleman's Agreement, A Streetcar Named Desire, On the Waterfront, East of Eden, A Face in the Crowd, Wild River, America America
- 7
  - Frank Capra: The Strong Man, The Power of the Press, It Happened One Night, Lost Horizon, Mr. Smith Goes to Washington, Why We Fight, It's a Wonderful Life
  - Wilfred Jackson: Snow White and the Seven Dwarfs (sequence director), The Old Mill, Pinocchio (sequence director), Fantasia, Dumbo (sequence director), Cinderella, Lady and the Tramp
  - Buster Keaton: One Week, Cops, Sherlock Jr., The Navigator, The General, Steamboat Bill, Jr., The Cameraman
  - Steven Spielberg: Jaws, Close Encounters of the Third Kind, Raiders of the Lost Ark, E.T. the Extra-Terrestrial, Jurassic Park, Schindler's List, Saving Private Ryan
  - George Stevens: Swing Time, Gunga Din, Woman of the Year, George Stevens' World War II footage, A Place in the Sun, Shane, Giant
  - Billy Wilder: The Lost Weekend, Double Indemnity, Sunset Boulevard, Ace in the Hole, Sabrina, Some Like It Hot, The Apartment
- 6
  - Charlie Chaplin: The Immigrant, The Kid, The Gold Rush, City Lights, Modern Times, The Great Dictator
  - Michael Curtiz: The Adventures of Robin Hood, Angels with Dirty Faces, Yankee Doodle Dandy, Casablanca, Mildred Pierce, White Christmas
  - William Kennedy Dickson: Newark Athlete, Blacksmith Scene, Edison Kinetographic Record of a Sneeze, The Dickson Experimental Sound Film, Annabelle Serpentine Dance, Rip Van Winkle
  - D. W. Griffith: Lady Helen's Escapade, A Corner in Wheat, The Musketeers of Pig Alley, The Birth of a Nation, Intolerance, Broken Blossoms
  - John Huston: The Maltese Falcon, The Battle of San Pietro, Let There Be Light, The Treasure of the Sierra Madre, The Asphalt Jungle, The African Queen
  - Stanley Kubrick: Paths of Glory, Spartacus, Dr. Strangelove, 2001: A Space Odyssey, A Clockwork Orange, The Shining
  - Vincente Minnelli: Cabin in the Sky, Meet Me in St. Louis, An American in Paris, The Bad and the Beautiful, The Band Wagon, Gigi
  - King Vidor: The Big Parade, The Crowd, Show People, Hallelujah, Our Daily Bread, The Wizard of Oz (uncredited)
- 5
  - Spike Lee: She's Gotta Have It, Do the Right Thing, Malcolm X, 4 Little Girls, Bamboozled
  - Ernst Lubitsch: Lady Windermere's Fan, Trouble in Paradise, Ninotchka, The Shop Around the Corner, To Be or Not to Be
  - Sidney Lumet: 12 Angry Men, The Pawnbroker, King: A Filmed Record... Montgomery to Memphis, Dog Day Afternoon, Network
  - Otto Preminger: Laura, Carmen Jones, The Man with the Golden Arm, Porgy and Bess, Anatomy of a Murder
  - Martin Scorsese: Mean Streets, Taxi Driver, The Last Waltz, Raging Bull, Goodfellas
  - Ben Sharpsteen: Snow White and the Seven Dwarfs (sequence director), Pinocchio (supervising director), Fantasia, Dumbo (supervising director), Cinderella (supervising director)
  - William Wellman: Wings, The Public Enemy, Wild Boys of the Road, The Ox-Bow Incident, The Story of G.I. Joe
- 4
  - Robert Altman: M* A* S* H, McCabe & Mrs. Miller, The Long Goodbye, Nashville
  - Francis Ford Coppola: The Godfather, The Godfather Part II, The Conversation, Apocalypse Now
  - Stanley Donen: On the Town, Singin' in the Rain, Seven Brides for Seven Brothers, Charade
  - Dave Fleischer: Koko's Earth Control, Snow White, Popeye the Sailor Meets Sindbad the Sailor, Let's All Go to the Lobby (uncredited)
  - Clyde Geronimi: Bambi (sequence director; uncredited), Cinderella, Lady and the Tramp, Sleeping Beauty (supervising director)
  - Mervyn LeRoy: Little Caesar, I Am a Fugitive from a Chain Gang, Gold Diggers of 1933, The House I Live In (uncredited)
  - Hamilton Luske: Pinocchio (supervising director), Fantasia, Cinderella, Lady and the Tramp
  - Rouben Mamoulian: Applause, Love Me Tonight, Becky Sharp, The Mark of Zorro
  - Edwin S. Porter: Life of an American Fireman, The Great Train Robbery, Dream of a Rarebit Fiend, Tess of the Storm Country
  - Martin Ritt: Edge of the City, Hud, Sounder, Norma Rae
  - Preston Sturges: The Lady Eve, Sullivan's Travels, The Miracle of Morgan's Creek, Hail the Conquering Hero
  - Maurice Tourneur: The Wishing Ring: An Idyll of Old England, The Poor Little Rich Girl, The Blue Bird, The Last of the Mohicans
  - Josef von Sternberg: It (uncredited), The Last Command, The Docks of New York, Morocco
  - Raoul Walsh: Regeneration, The Thief of Bagdad, The Big Trail, White Heat
  - Orson Welles: Citizen Kane, The Magnificent Ambersons, The Lady from Shanghai, Touch of Evil
  - James Whale: Frankenstein, The Invisible Man, Bride of Frankenstein, Show Boat
- 3
  - James Algar: Fantasia, Bambi (sequence director), The Living Desert
  - Samuel Armstrong: Fantasia, Dumbo (sequence director), Bambi (sequence director)
  - Lloyd Bacon: 42nd Street, Footlight Parade, Knute Rockne, All American
  - Clarence G. Badger: Jubilo, Hands Up!, It
  - Reginald Barker: The Bargain, The Italian, Civilization
  - Frank Borzage: Humoresque, The Lady, Seventh Heaven
  - Mel Brooks: The Producers, Blazing Saddles, Young Frankenstein
  - Clarence Brown: The Last of the Mohicans, Flesh and the Devil, National Velvet
  - James Cameron: The Terminator, Terminator 2: Judgment Day, Titanic
  - John Cassavetes: Shadows, Faces, A Woman Under the Influence
  - Edward F. Cline: One Week, Cops, The Bank Dick
  - Joel and Ethan Coen: Fargo, The Big Lebowski, No Country for Old Men
  - Merian C. Cooper: Grass, King Kong, This Is Cinerama
  - Jonathan Demme: Stop Making Sense, The Silence of the Lambs, Philadelphia
  - Blake Edwards: Days of Wine and Roses, The Pink Panther, Breakfast at Tiffany's
  - Rob Epstein: Word Is Out: Stories of Some of Our Lives, The Times of Harvey Milk, Common Threads: Stories from the Quilt
  - Norm Ferguson: Pinocchio (sequence director), Fantasia, Dumbo (sequence director)
  - Victor Fleming: Red Dust, Gone with the Wind, The Wizard of Oz
  - Samuel Fuller: V-E+1, Pickup on South Street, Shock Corridor
  - David Hand: Snow White and the Seven Dwarfs (supervising director), Fantasia, Bambi (supervising director)
  - Chuck Jones: Duck Amuck, One Froggy Evening, What's Opera, Doc?
  - Henry King: Tol'able David, State Fair, Twelve O'Clock High
  - Jack Kinney: Pinocchio (sequence director), Dumbo (sequence director), The Story of Menstruation (uncredited)
  - John Landis: National Lampoon's Animal House, The Blues Brothers, Michael Jackson's Thriller
  - John Lasseter: Luxo Jr., Tin Toy, Toy Story
  - George Lucas: Electronic Labyrinth: THX 1138 4EB, American Graffiti, Star Wars
  - Winsor McCay: Little Nemo, Gertie the Dinosaur, The Sinking of the Lusitania
  - Lewis Milestone: All Quiet on the Western Front, The Front Page, A Walk in the Sun
  - Dudley Murphy: St. Louis Blues, Black and Tan, The Emperor Jones
  - Gregory Nava: El Norte, My Family, Selena
  - Christopher Nolan: Memento, The Dark Knight, Inception
  - Arthur Penn: The Miracle Worker, Bonnie and Clyde, Little Big Man
  - Nicholas Ray: In a Lonely Place, Johnny Guitar, Rebel Without a Cause
  - Rob Reiner: This Is Spinal Tap, The Princess Bride, When Harry Met Sally...
  - Bill Roberts: Fantasia, Dumbo (sequence director), Bambi (sequence director)
  - Ridley Scott: Alien, Blade Runner, Thelma & Louise
  - Luis Valdez: I Am Joaquín, Zoot Suit, La Bamba
  - W. S. Van Dyke: The Thin Man, Naughty Marietta, The Prisoner of Zenda (uncredited)
  - Erich von Stroheim: Foolish Wives, Greed, The Wedding March
  - Lois Weber: Suspense, Where Are My Children? (uncredited), Shoes
  - Robert Wise: The Day the Earth Stood Still, West Side Story, The Sound of Music
  - Frederick Wiseman: Titicut Follies, High School, Hospital
  - Sam Wood: A Night at the Opera, Gone with the Wind (uncredited), The Pride of the Yankees
  - Robert Zemeckis: Back to the Future, Who Framed Roger Rabbit, Forrest Gump
  - Fred Zinnemann: High Noon, From Here to Eternity, Oklahoma!
- 2
  - Robert Aldrich: Kiss Me Deadly, What Ever Happened to Baby Jane?
  - Woody Allen: Annie Hall, Manhattan
  - Wes Anderson: Rushmore, The Grand Budapest Hotel
  - Kenneth Anger: Eaux d'Artifice, Scorpio Rising
  - Hal Ashby: Harold and Maude, Being There
  - John G. Avildsen: Rocky, The Karate Kid
  - William Beaudine: Sparrows, Mom and Dad
  - Billy Bitzer: Westinghouse Works, 1904, Interior New York Subway, 14th Street to 42nd Street
  - Les Blank: Chulas Fronteras, Garlic Is as Good as Ten Mothers
  - John Boorman: Point Blank, Deliverance
  - Martin Brest: Hot Dogs for Gauguin, Beverly Hills Cop
  - Richard Brooks: Blackboard Jungle, In Cold Blood
  - Tod Browning: Dracula, Freaks
  - Clyde Bruckman: The General, The Battle of the Century
  - Charles Burnett: Killer of Sheep, To Sleep with Anger
  - John Carpenter: Halloween, The Thing
  - Shirley Clarke: The Cool World, Portrait of Jason
  - Julie Dash: Illusions, Daughters of the Dust
  - Cecil B. DeMille: The Cheat, The Ten Commandments
  - Richard Donner: Superman, The Goonies
  - Clint Eastwood: The Outlaw Josey Wales, Unforgiven
  - Robert J. Flaherty: Nanook of the North, Louisiana Story
  - Robert Florey: The Life and Death of 9413: a Hollywood Extra, Daughter of Shanghai
  - Miloš Forman: One Flew Over the Cuckoo's Nest, Amadeus
  - Bob Fosse: Cabaret, All That Jazz
  - John Frankenheimer: The Manchurian Candidate, Seconds
  - William Friedkin: The French Connection, The Exorcist
  - Robert Gardner: The Hunters, Dead Birds
  - Louis J. Gasnier: The Perils of Pauline, The Exploits of Elaine
  - Burt Gillett: Flowers and Trees, Three Little Pigs
  - Michael Gordon: Cyrano de Bergerac, Pillow Talk
  - Alfred E. Green: Ella Cinders, Baby Face
  - T. Hee: Pinocchio (sequence director), Fantasia
  - Amy Heckerling: Fast Times at Ridgemont High, Clueless
  - William Heise: Annabelle Serpentine Dance, The Kiss
  - George Roy Hill: Butch Cassidy and the Sundance Kid, The Sting
  - William K. Howard: The Power and the Glory, Knute Rockne, All American (uncredited)
  - John Hubley: Gerald McBoing-Boing (supervising director), The Hole
  - John Hughes: The Breakfast Club, Ferris Bueller's Day Off
  - Gene Kelly: On the Town, Singin' in the Rain
  - Jim Klein: Growing Up Female, Union Maids
  - Randal Kleiser: Peege, Grease
  - Stanley Kramer: Judgment at Nuremberg, Guess Who's Coming to Dinner
  - Gregory La Cava: So's Your Old Man, My Man Godfrey
  - Fritz Lang: Fury, The Big Heat
  - David Lean: The Bridge on the River Kwai, Lawrence of Arabia
  - Ang Lee: The Wedding Banquet, Brokeback Mountain
  - Richard Linklater: Slacker, Before Sunrise
  - Pare Lorentz: The Plow That Broke the Plains, The River
  - Ida Lupino: Outrage, The Hitch-Hiker
  - Terrence Malick: Badlands, Days of Heaven
  - Joseph L. Mankiewicz: All About Eve, King: A Filmed Record... Montgomery to Memphis
  - Anthony Mann: Winchester '73, The Naked Spur
  - George Marshall: Destry Rides Again, How the West Was Won (segment)
  - Albert and David Maysles: Salesman, Grey Gardens
  - Oscar Micheaux: Within Our Gates, Body and Soul
  - Errol Morris: The Thin Blue Line, The Fog of War
  - F. W. Murnau: Sunrise, Tabu: A Story of the South Seas
  - Fred C. Newmeyer: Safety Last!, The Freshman
  - Fred Niblo: The Mark of Zorro, Ben-Hur
  - Mike Nichols: Who's Afraid of Virginia Woolf?, The Graduate
  - George Pal: Tulips Shall Grow, John Henry and the Inky-Poo
  - Gordon Parks: The Learning Tree, Shaft
  - Sam Peckinpah: Ride the High Country, The Wild Bunch
  - D. A. Pennebaker: Dont Look Back, Monterey Pop
  - Roman Polanski: Rosemary's Baby, Chinatown
  - Julia Reichert: Growing Up Female, Union Maids
  - Robert Rodriguez: El Mariachi, Spy Kids
  - Robert Rossen: All the King's Men, The Hustler
  - Denis Sanders: A Time Out of War, Czechoslovakia 1968
  - Paul Satterfield: Fantasia, Bambi (sequence director)
  - John Sayles: Return of the Secaucus 7, Matewan
  - Franklin J. Schaffner: Planet of the Apes, Patton
  - Ernest B. Schoedsack: Grass, King Kong
  - Edward Sedgwick: The Phantom of the Opera (uncredited), The Cameraman
  - George B. Seitz: The Exploits of Elaine, Love Finds Andy Hardy
  - William Selig: The Tramp and the Dog, Something Good – Negro Kiss
  - Don Siegel: Invasion of the Body Snatchers, Dirty Harry
  - Douglas Sirk: All That Heaven Allows, Imitation of Life
  - Victor Sjöström: He Who Gets Slapped, The Wind
  - Phillips Smalley: Suspense, Where Are My Children? (uncredited)
  - John M. Stahl: Imitation of Life, Leave Her to Heaven
  - Ralph Steiner: H2O, The City
  - Robert Stevenson: Old Yeller, Mary Poppins
  - Mel Stuart: Willy Wonka & the Chocolate Factory, Wattstax
  - John Sturges: Bad Day at Black Rock, The Magnificent Seven
  - Frank Tashlin: The Way of Peace, Will Success Spoil Rock Hunter?
  - Sam Taylor: Safety Last!, The Freshman
  - Jacques Tourneur: Cat People, Out of the Past
  - Wayne Wang: Chan Is Missing, The Joy Luck Club
  - Andy Warhol: Empire, Chelsea Girls
  - John Waters: Pink Flamingos, Hairspray
  - Fred M. Wilcox: Lassie Come Home, Forbidden Planet
  - Robert M. Young: Alambrista!, The Ballad of Gregorio Cortez
  - Charlotte Zwerin: Salesman, Thelonious Monk: Straight, No Chaser

== See also ==
- National Recording Registry
- These Amazing Shadows, a 2011 documentary film that relates the history and importance of the registry
