= Subsistence Homesteads Division =

US federal agency of the 1930s known as DSH

Subsistence Homesteads Division, Department of the Interior
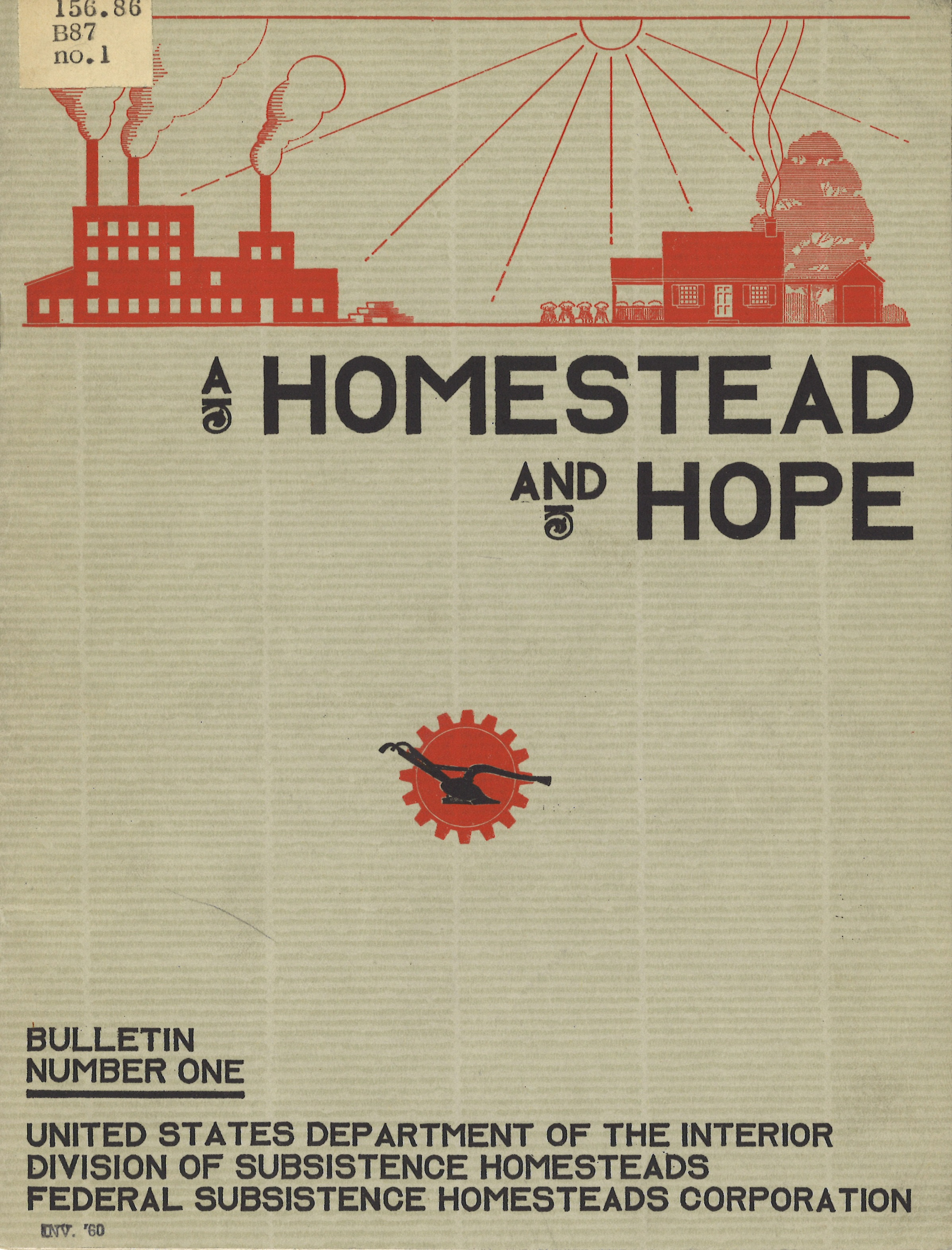

Agency overview
- Formed: August 23, 1933
- Dissolved: May 15, 1935
- Superseding agency: Transferred to Resettlement Administration
- Agency executive: Dr. Milburn L. Wilson, Director
- Parent agency: United States Department of the Interior
- Website: https://www.archives.gov/research/guide-fed-records/groups/096.html

The Subsistence Homesteads Division (or Division of Subsistence Homesteads, SHD or DSH) of the United States Department of the Interior was a New Deal agency that was intended to relieve industrial workers and struggling farmers from complete dependence on factory or agricultural work. The program was created in 1933 during the Great Depression to provide low-rent homesteads, including a home and small plots of land that would allow people to sustain themselves. Through the program, 34 communities were built. Residents were not allowed to purchase their homes for at least five years. They could not build up equity or make improvements or sell their property. These restrictions alienated people who were eager for homeownership. According to an in-depth sociological study in Alabama, "Practically, all participants in the new programs prefer an arrangement whereby they can purchase rather than rent their homes." The policy left the transient population in place—people who had less interest in long term community relationships. Unlike subsistence farming, subsistence homesteading is based on a family member or members having part-time, paid employment.

== Philosophy ==
The subsistence homesteading program was based on an agrarian, "back-to-the-land" philosophy which meant a partial return to the simpler, farming life of the past. Eleanor and Franklin Roosevelt both endorsed the idea that for poor people, rural life could be healthier than city life. Cooperation, community socialization, and community work were also emphasized. However, going "back-to-the-land" did not always sit well with people stuck in outlying "stranded communities" without jobs. According to Liz Straw of the Tennessee Historical Commission, the most controversial were those rural communities of long-unemployed miners or timber workers whom opponents of subsistence homesteading thought unlikely to thrive without better job opportunities.

== Definition and description ==
In response to the Great Depression, the Subsistence Homesteads Division was created by the federal government in 1933 with the aim to improve the living conditions of individuals moving away from overcrowded urban centers while also giving them the opportunity to experience small-scale farming and home ownership. Subsistence Homesteads Division Director, Milburn L. Wilson, defined a "subsistence homestead" as follows:

A subsistence homestead denotes a house and out buildings located upon a plot of land on which can be grown a large portion of foodstuffs required by the homestead family. It signifies production for home consumption and not for commercial sale. In that it provides for subsistence alone, it carries with it the corollary that cash income must be drawn from some outside source. The central motive of the subsistence homestead program, therefore, is to demonstrate the economic value of a livelihood which combines part-time wage work and part-time gardening or farming.

DSH projects "would be initiated at the state level and administered through a nonprofit corporation. Successful applicants were offered a combination of part-time employment opportunities, fertile soil for part-time farming, and locations connected to the services of established cities." The homesteads were organized to combine the benefits of rural and urban living - communities meant to demonstrate a different path towards a healthier and more economically secure future.

== History ==
The Division of Subsistence Homesteads was created by the Secretary of the Interior as an order to fulfill the National Industrial Recovery Act of 1933. Milburn Lincoln Wilson, then belonging to the USDA's Agricultural Adjustment Administration, was selected by President Frank D. Roosevelt to lead the new Division under Secretary of the Interior, Harold Ickes. Wilson and his advisory committee determined that they wanted the project to prioritize areas hit especially hard by Depression. The book by sociologist Howard W. Odum Southern Regions of the United States (1936) pulled together a wide variety of facts and figures about the Southeast. This book was heavily used by government administrators, and regional planners as well as scholars. Initially, the cost of the houses was not to exceed $2,000 and the homesteads would fall under the administration of the Division and local non-profit corporation created specifically for the community. The same year, Carl Cleveland Taylor, the 36th President of the American Sociological Society, was appointed sociologist with the SHD. Some of the subsistence homesteading communities included African Americans; Assistant Supervisor John P. Murchison wrote to W. E. B. Du Bois in April 1934 for advice on racial integration and how to incorporate African Americans into the program. Eleanor Roosevelt took personal interest in the project, and became involved in setting up the first community, Arthurdale, WV after a visit to the stranded miners of Scotts Run.

There was strong opposition to the idea of subsistence homesteads, as undercutting agricultural prices, unions, and the labor supply for manufacturing. Nonetheless, as of 2011, some communities, such as Arthurdale, West Virginia, in which Eleanor Roosevelt was personally involved, maintain an active memory of the program. By March 1934, 30 projects had been started. Twenty-one were considered garden-home projects, two were full-time farming projects near urban areas, five were for unemployed miners and two were combinations of the aforementioned types. In June 1935, the powers granted to DSH under the National Industrial Recovery Act expired. On April 30, Executive Order No. 7027 had created the Resettlement Administration; part of their mandate gave them authority "to administer approved projects involving resettlement of destitute or low-income families from rural and urban areas, including the establishment, maintenance and operation, in such connection, of communities in rural and suburban areas." By another Executive Order (No. 7530), the Subsistence Housing Project was transferred from the Department of Interior to the U.S. Department of Agriculture in 1936. By the next year, the program had been transferred once again, this time to the Federal Public Housing Authority, where it was formally abolished. Various architects including Mary Almy, helped design the buildings and homes built under the project.

== List of Subsistence Homesteads Division communities ==
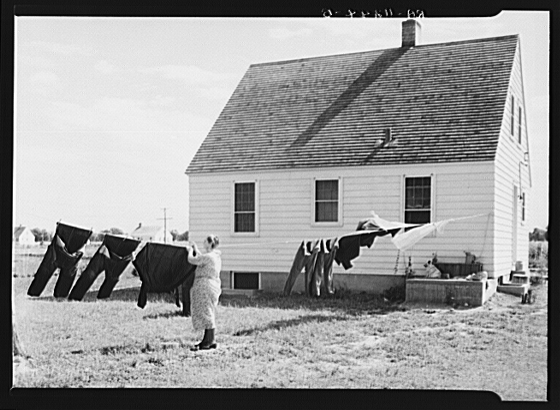
Austin Homesteads, Minnesota (1936)

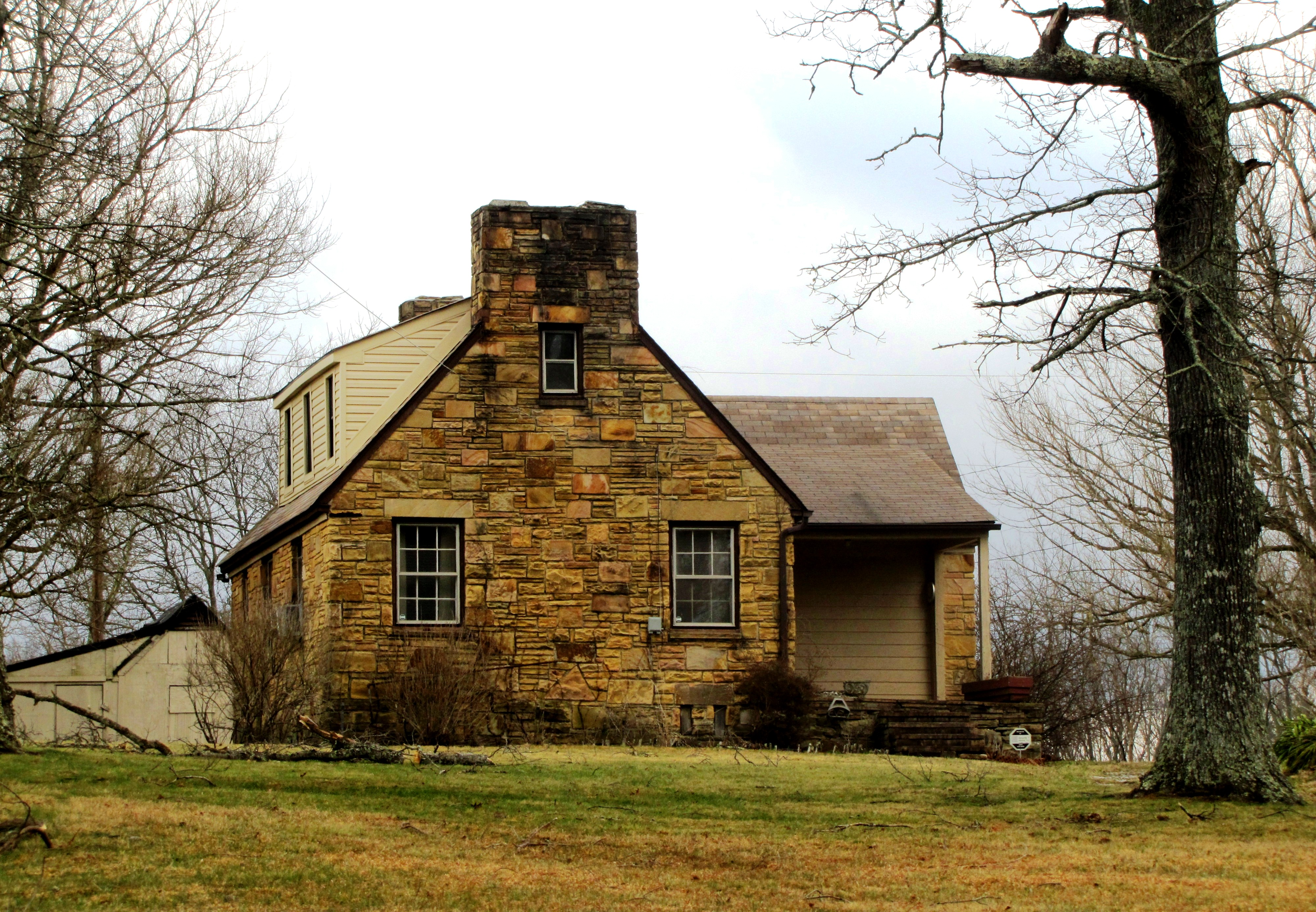
Cumberland Homesteads, Tennessee (2012)

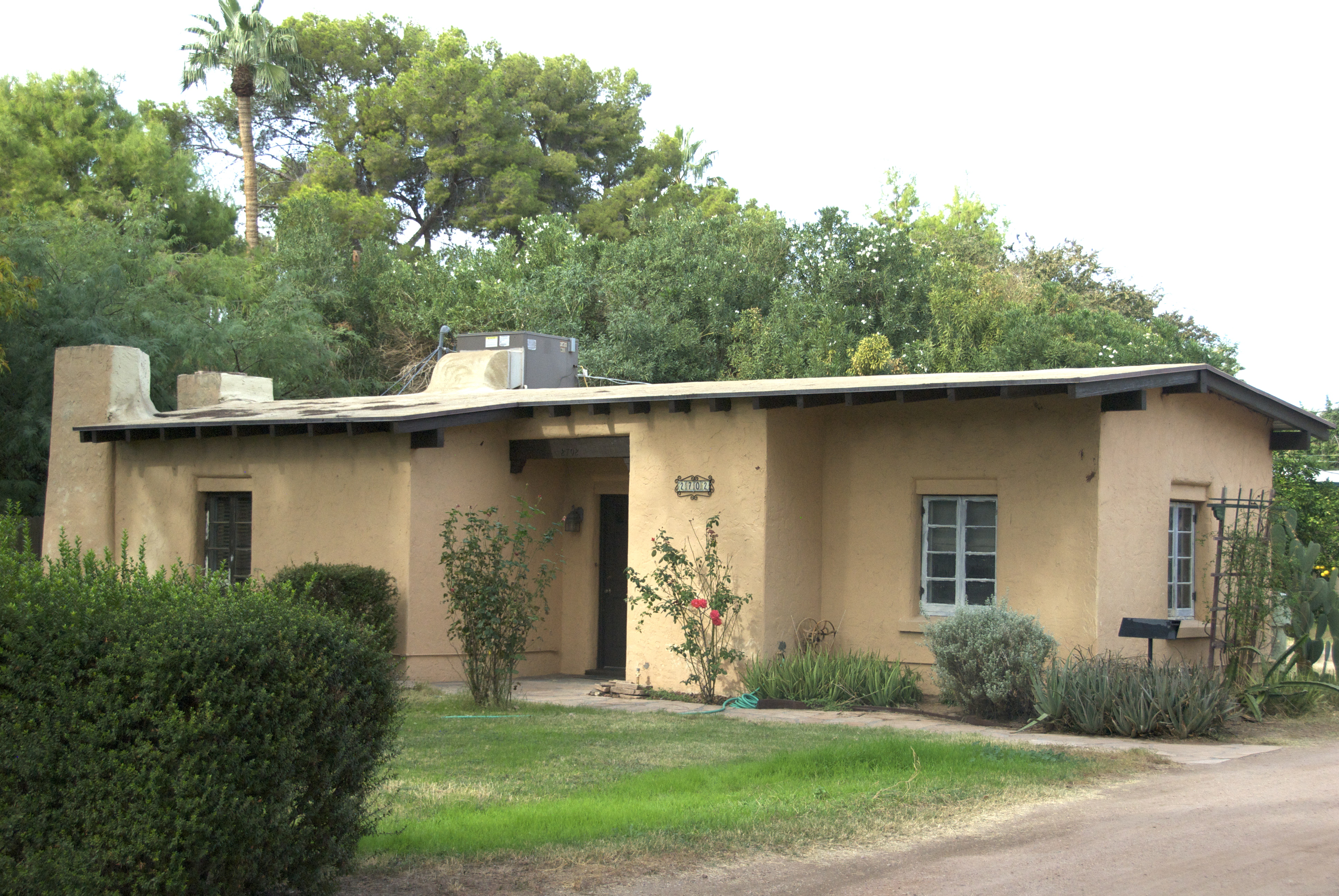
Phoenix Homesteads Historic District, Arizona (2012)

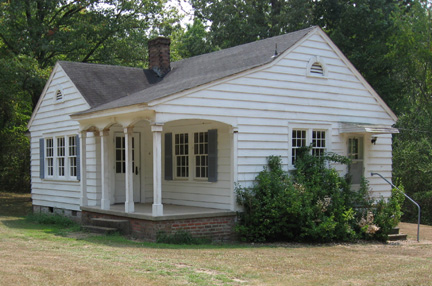
Tupelo Homesteads Historic District, Mississippi

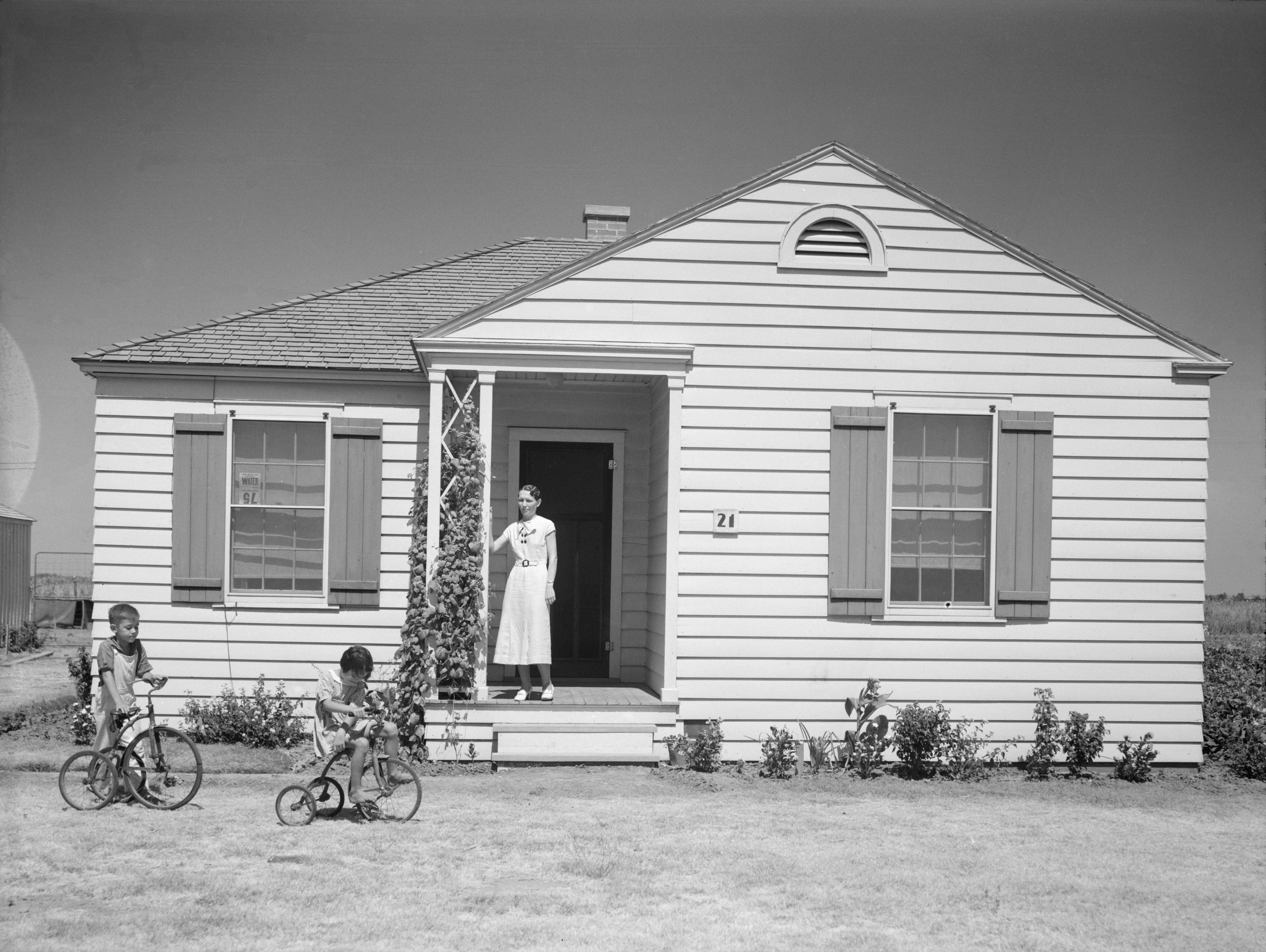
Wichita Gardens, Texas (1936)

These communities were planned and built:

Name	Locale	State	Notes
Aberdeen Gardens	Hampton	Virginia	
Arthurdale	Arthurdale	West Virginia	
Austin Homesteads/Austin Acres	Austin	Minnesota	
Bankhead Farms	near Jasper	Alabama	
Beauxart Gardens	Jefferson County	Texas	Near Beaumont, Texas
Cumberland Homesteads	Cumberland County	Tennessee	
Dalworthington Gardens	Tarrant County	Texas	
Dayton Homesteads	Dayton	Ohio	
Decatur Homesteads	Decatur	Indiana	
Duluth Homesteads	Duluth	Minnesota	
El Monte Homesteads	El Monte	California	
Eleanor	Eleanor	West Virginia	
Granger Homesteads	Granger	Iowa	
Greenwood Homesteads	near Birmingham	Alabama	
Hattiesburg Homesteads	Hattiesburg	Mississippi	
Houston Gardens	Houston	Texas	
Jersey Homesteads	Roosevelt	New Jersey	
Lake County Homesteads	Chicago	Illinois	
Longview Homesteads	Longview	Washington	
Magnolia Homesteads	Meridian	Mississippi	
McComb Homesteads	McComb	Mississippi	
Mount Olive Homesteads	near Birmingham	Alabama	
Palmerdale Homesteads	Pinson	Alabama	
Penderlea	Pender County	North Carolina	
Phoenix Homesteads	Phoenix	Arizona	
Piedmont Homesteads	Jasper County	Georgia	
Richton Homesteads	Richton	Mississippi	
San Fernando Homesteads	San Fernando	California	
Shenandoah Homesteads	Rappahannock County	Virginia	
Three Rivers Gardens	Three Rivers	Texas	
Tupelo Homesteads	Lee County	Mississippi	
Cahaba Homesteads/"Slagheap Village"	Birmingham	Alabama	
Tygart Valley Homesteads	Dailey	West Virginia	
Westmoreland Homesteads	Norvelt	Pennsylvania	
Wichita Gardens	Wichita Falls	Texas	

== Current status ==
Of the communities listed, five are considered national or local historic districts, including Aberdeen Gardens (VA), Arthurdale (WV), Phoenix Homesteads (AZ), Tupelo Homesteads (MS), Cahaba Homesteads/ Slagheap Village (AL), and Tygart Valley Homesteads (WV).

== See also ==
- A Homestead and Hope - the first bulletin for the Division of Subsistence Homesteads, U.S. Department of Interior
- Homestead Project Timeline
- Urban homesteading
- Smallholding
- Five Acres and Independence
- NARA Records of the Farmers Home Administration (FmHA) (Record Group 96) 1918-80 (bulk 1932–59)

96.2.4 Records of the Subsistence Homesteads Division and its successors

History: Subsistence Homesteads Division organized in the Department of the Interior, August 23, 1933, under provisions of EO 6209, July 21, 1933, implementing the subsistence homesteads program of the National Industrial Recovery Act of 1933 (48 Stat. 205), June 16, 1933. Transferred to Resettlement Administration by EO 7041, May 15, 1935.

Textual Records: Correspondence with the general public ("Requests for General Information"), 1933-35. Correspondence concerning proposed subsistence homestead projects, 1933-35. Correspondence concerning a census of part-time farming, 1933-34. Records relating to wages of workers employed on subsistence homestead projects, 1934-35.

Architectural and Engineering Plans (2,500 items): Paper tracings and blueprints of "subsistence homesteads" and "experimental villages" built by the Subsistence Homesteads Division (Interior), Division of Subsistence Homesteads (Resettlement Administration), and FSA, including plans of the Arthurdale Community and Reedsville, WV, projects, 1933-38.
