= Luis R. Esteves =

US Army general (1893–1958)

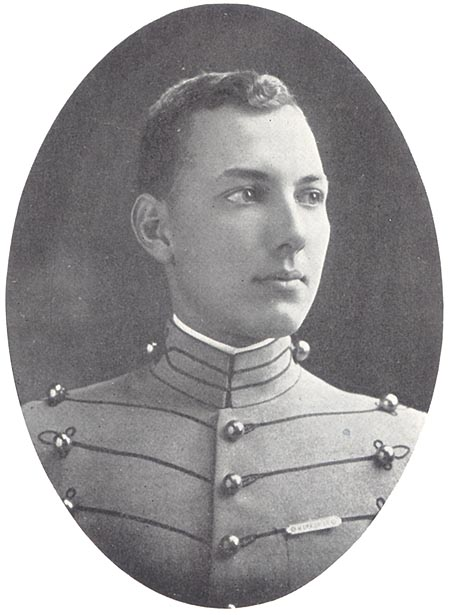
- Esteves in 1915

Adjutant General of Puerto Rico
- In office 1938–1957
- Governor: Blanton C. Winship; José E. Colom (acting); William D. Leahy; José M. Gallardo (acting); Guy J. Swope; Rexford G. Tugwell; Jesús T. Piñero; Luis Muñoz Marín
- Preceded by: John A. Wilson
- Succeeded by: Eduardo Andino

Personal details
- Born: April 30, 1893 Aguadilla, Puerto Rico
- Died: March 12, 1958 (aged 64) San Juan, Puerto Rico
- Resting place: Old Urban Cemetery in Aguadilla, Puerto Rico
- Spouse: Guadalupe Navarro
- Children: 4
- Parents: Francisco Esteves Soriano; Enedina Völckers Van der Dijs

Military service
- Allegiance: United States
- Branch/service: United States Army; Army National Guard
- Years of service: 1915–1957
- Rank: Major General
- Unit: Puerto Rico National Guard
- Commands: 92nd Infantry Brigade; Puerto Rico Adjutant General
- Battles/wars: Mexican Border War; World War I World War II; Puerto Rican Nationalist Party insurgency
- Awards: Legion of Merit

Major General Luis Raul Esteves (April 30, 1893 – March 12, 1958) was the first Puerto Rican and the first American citizen of Hispanic heritage to graduate from the United States Military Academy (West Point), and the founder of the Puerto Rico National Guard. Of his West Point class, that included Dwight Eisenhower, Omar Bradley, Joseph McNarney, James Van Fleet and George E. Stratemeyer, Esteves was the first to achieve the rank of general.

== Early years ==
Esteves was born Luis Raul Esteves y Völckers in Aguadilla, Puerto Rico on April 30, 1893. (Note: In this Spanish name, the first or paternal surname is Esteves and the second or maternal family name is Völckers.) His father and mother were also natives of Aguadilla. His father, Francisco Esteves Soriano had served in the Spanish Army and his mother, Enedina Völckers Van der Dijs, of German and Dutch descent, was a housewife. His father, had also served as mayor of Aguadilla. Esteves received his primary education in the local grammar school and went to high school in Mayagüez, Puerto Rico.

At the outbreak of the Spanish–American War, the Esteves Völckers family welcomed the Americans as an alternative to Spanish rule of the island. Esteves's father wanted his son to continue the family military tradition and encouraged him to consider a military career. However, his mother had other plans. She wanted her son to become an engineer and to study in the United States. The family's financial situation did not permit her to realize her dream.

Esteves saw a news advertisement announcing examinations for the entry into the United States Military Academy at West Point, New York and applied without his parents' knowledge. He passed the exam, was accepted to and eventually graduated from West Point, thus becoming the first Puerto Rican to do so.

== West Point ==
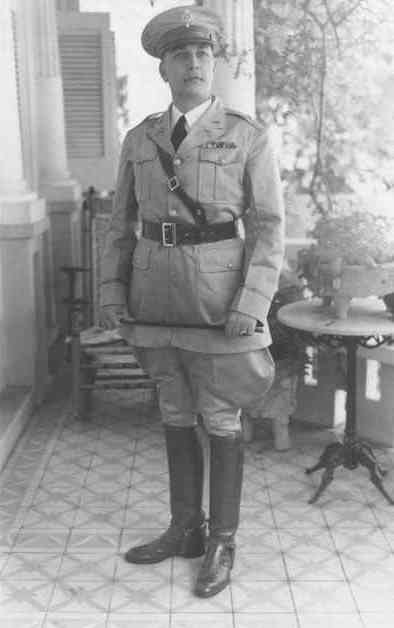
Major General Luis R. Esteves

While at West Point he tutored Dwight D. Eisenhower in Spanish, as a second language was required in order to graduate. In 1915, Esteves graduated with Eisenhower and Omar Bradley among his classmates, and was the first Puerto Rican graduate of the academy. He was later the first graduate of 1915, "the class the stars fell on", to reach the rank of general. One of the problems that Esteves faced upon his graduation was that in order to become an officer in the U.S. Army he had to be a citizen of the United States and Puerto Ricans at the time were not. The War Department was able find a precedent when they remembered that during the American Revolutionary War, foreign officers like Gilbert du Motier, Marquis de Lafayette and Friedrich Wilhelm von Steuben were given commissions in the Continental Army. He obtained the rank of Second Lieutenant and was assigned to the 23rd Infantry Regiment, where he worked in the National Matches of Florida.

== Pancho Villa incident ==
Esteves served as a 2nd lieutenant in the 8th Infantry Brigade of the U.S. Army under the command of General Pershing, when he was sent to El Paso, Texas during the "Pancho Villa Incident". During the onset of the Battle of Columbus in June 1916, Esteves was promoted to first lieutenant. He was given charge of infantry units and assigned to protect bridges. From El Paso, he was sent to the town of Polvo, Mexico. After being transferred to the town of Polvo, the population named him mayor and judge during his stay.

== Puerto Rico National Guard ==
Esteves was then promoted to the rank of captain. Esteves helped organize the 23rd Battalion, which was composed of Puerto Ricans and was stationed in Panama during World War I. Esteves was later assigned command of a machine gun company and a battalion. He was sent to Camp Las Casas and Henry Barracks in Puerto Rico and served as an instructor in the preparation of Puerto Rican Officers for the Porto Rico Regiment of Infantry (which in 1919 was renamed the 65th Infantry).

He saw a need for a Puerto Rican National Guard. Esteves pressured colonial governor Arthur Yager and the colonial legislature about the necessity of a local militia. His request was met with approval. The National Guard Bureau approved this initiative, and on July 19, 1919, the current incarnation of the PRNG was organized. In 1918, he was promoted to Major and by 1919, the first regiment of the Puerto Rico National Guard was formed. After the war, Esteves was sent to Washington, D.C., however his assignment there was cut short and he resigned his commission in the Regular Army because of a medical admonition that residence in a cold climate could have been fatal to his wife. Esteves joined the new entity on February 25, 1920, as commander of the First Battalion of the First Puerto Rico Regiment and its companies. On February 7, 1939, Esteves was named Adjutant General. He was responsible for funneling an increase of new recruits at Camp Tortuguero. In 1942, Esteves was given command of the temporary State Guard.

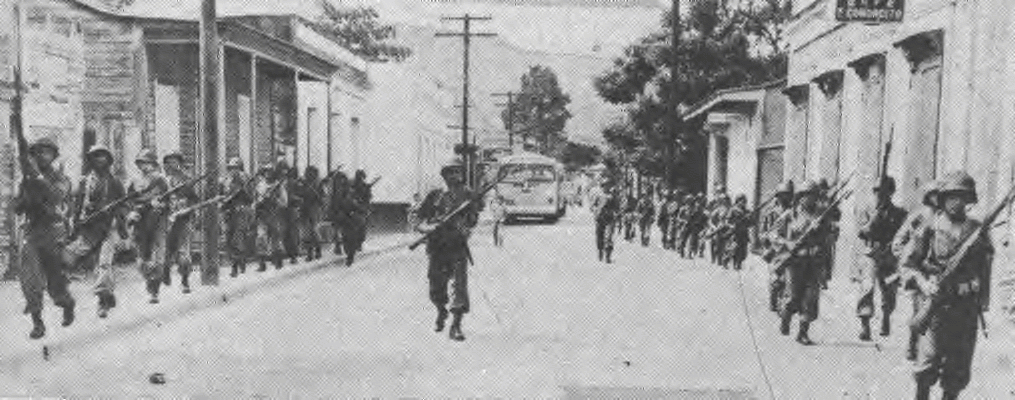
The National Guard, commanded by the Puerto Rico Adjutant General Major General Luis R. Esteves and under the orders of Gov. Luis Muñoz Marín, occupying Jayuya

On October 15, 1940, the Puerto Rico National Guard was activated pursuant to Executive Order 3551. Esteves was promoted to the rank of Brigadier General and ordered to active duty and given the command of the 92nd Infantry Brigade. He commanded the 92nd until he was summoned by José Miguel Gallardo the Interim Governor of Puerto Rico to organize a State Guard, with the Army's approval, that in a short time consisted of nine well trained and equipped regiments. On June 22, 1946, Esteves was awarded with the Legion of Merit by the Military Department of the Antilles. During this time, he reorganized the Puerto Rico National Guard and held the position of Adjutant General until his retirement in June 1957.

On October 30, 1950, the Puerto Rican Nationalist Party organized a series of uprisings in numerous cities in Puerto Rico against the United States rule and the Puerto Rican commonwealth government in what is known as the Puerto Rican Nationalist Party Revolts of the 1950s. The Puerto Rico National Guard was mobilized under the command of Esteves by orders of Governor Luis Muñoz Marín and U.S. Brigadier Gen. Edwin L. Sibert, and sent to confront the Nationalists in various towns such as Jayuya, Utuado and San Juan.

== Later years ==
General Esteves' main hobby was studying military history. He also published two books, Los Barrabases and ¡Los Soldados Son Así! (Soldiers are like that). In ¡Los Soldados Son Así!, he tells about many anecdotes, jokes, and stories of the Boricua (Puerto Rican) soldiers, covering the period from when the ancient regiment from Puerto Rico was organized (which today is the 65 Infantry) up to the Second World War. He also authored Cosas de Viajero and Cosas de Soldados.

Esteves married Guadalupe Navarro, with whom he had four children, Raúl, Roberto, Maricel and Vernon. Esteves also helped establish the first two theaters in Aguadilla, his hometown, with the help of fellow community leader Juan Garcia. On April 30, 1957, Esteves retired from service due to health concerns. On March 12, 1958, Esteves died in Santurce as a complication of these issues. His remains are interred in Cementerio Histórico Urbano de Aguadilla. On August 24, 1958, the PRNG's Armory was re-baptized in his honor. On May 11, 1962, Division General Juan Cordero dedicated a speech to him during the re-inauguration of the PRNG's Military Museum.

== Legacy ==
The former Puerto Rico National Guard Armory in Hato Rey, Puerto Rico "Gen. Luis R. Esteves" and the street in front of the Puerto Rico National Guard's headquarters in Old San Juan, Puerto Rico was renamed "La Calle Gen. Esteves" in his honor.

In 2017 General Esteves was posthumously inducted to the Puerto Rico Veterans Hall of Fame.

== Military awards and decorations ==
Among Major General Luis R. Esteves' military decoration and awards are the following:

1	Combat Infantryman Badge		
2	Legion of Merit	Mexican Service Medal	Mexican Border Service Medal
3	World War I Victory Medal	Army of Occupation Medal	National Defense Service Medal
4	American Defense Service Medal with one bronze service star	American Campaign Medal	World War II Victory Medal

== See also ==
- List of Puerto Ricans
- List of Puerto Rican military personnel
- Puerto Ricans in World War I
- Puerto Ricans in World War II
- Puerto Rico Adjutant General
- 65th Infantry
- German immigration to Puerto Rico

== Bibliography ==
- Norat, José Angel (March 27, 1987). Historia y Tradiciones: Guardia Nacional de Puerto Rico - Cinco Centurias... En Guardia. Esmaco Printers.

Military offices
Preceded by Commander John A. Wilson	Adjutant General of the Puerto Rico National Guard; 1938–1957	Succeeded by Brigadier General Eduardo Andino
