= Carl Taylor =

Carl Taylor may refer to:

- Carl E. Taylor (1916–2010), physician
- Carl Taylor (baseball) (born 1944), American Major League Baseball player
- Carl Taylor (footballer) (born 1937), English footballer
- Carl C. Taylor, softball coach at Rutgers University
- Carl Cleveland Taylor (1884–1975), American sociologist, demographer, and academic

== See also ==
- Karl Taylor (disambiguation)
