= M. L. Wilson =

American agronomist (1885–1969)

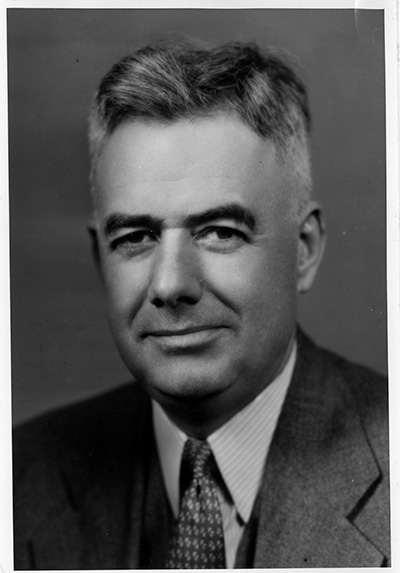

Under Secretary of Agriculture
- In office 1937 – January 1940
- President: Franklin D. Roosevelt
- Preceded by: Rexford Tugwell

Assistant Secretary of Agriculture
- In office July 2, 1934 – January 1, 1937
- President: Franklin D. Roosevelt
- Preceded by: Rexford Tugwell
- Succeeded by: Harry L. Brown

Personal details
- Born: Milburn Lincoln Wilson; October 23, 1885 Atlantic, Iowa, U.S.
- Died: November 22, 1969 (aged 84) Washington, D.C., USA
- Education: Iowa State University; University of Wisconsin-Madison

Milburn Lincoln Wilson (October 23, 1885 – November 22, 1969) was an American Undersecretary of the U.S. Department of Agriculture (USDA) under Presidents Franklin D. Roosevelt and Harry S. Truman under the New Deal and Fair Deal. His main interest was social justice for farmers. He made major contributions to federal agricultural policies, including creating the first domestic allotment plan for the Agricultural Adjustment Act and helping to create the first agricultural commodity programs and for the United States. He also convinced the Millers' National Federation and others to begin enriching bread and cereals.

Wilson also directed the Subsistence Homesteads Division of the U.S. Department of the Interior and was head of the Division of Farm Management and Cost Accounting for the Bureau of Agricultural Economics. He also helped establish the United Nations Food and Agriculture Organization.

== Early life ==
On October 23, 1885, Milburn Lincoln Wilson was born in Atlantic, Iowa. His parents were Mary E. Magee and John Wesley Wilson.

He attended Iowa State University, receiving a BSA in agronomy in 1907. While there, he was a member of Epsilon Sigma Phi and Phi Kappa Phi. He was also a member of the professional fraternity Alpha Zeta.

In 1907, Wilson was a tenant farmer in Nebraska. With the urging of agronomist Alfred Atkinson, he moved to Montana in 1909 as a homesteader near Fallon.

In 1920, he received an M.S. in agricultural economics and rural sociology from the University of Wisconsin–Madison.

== Career ==
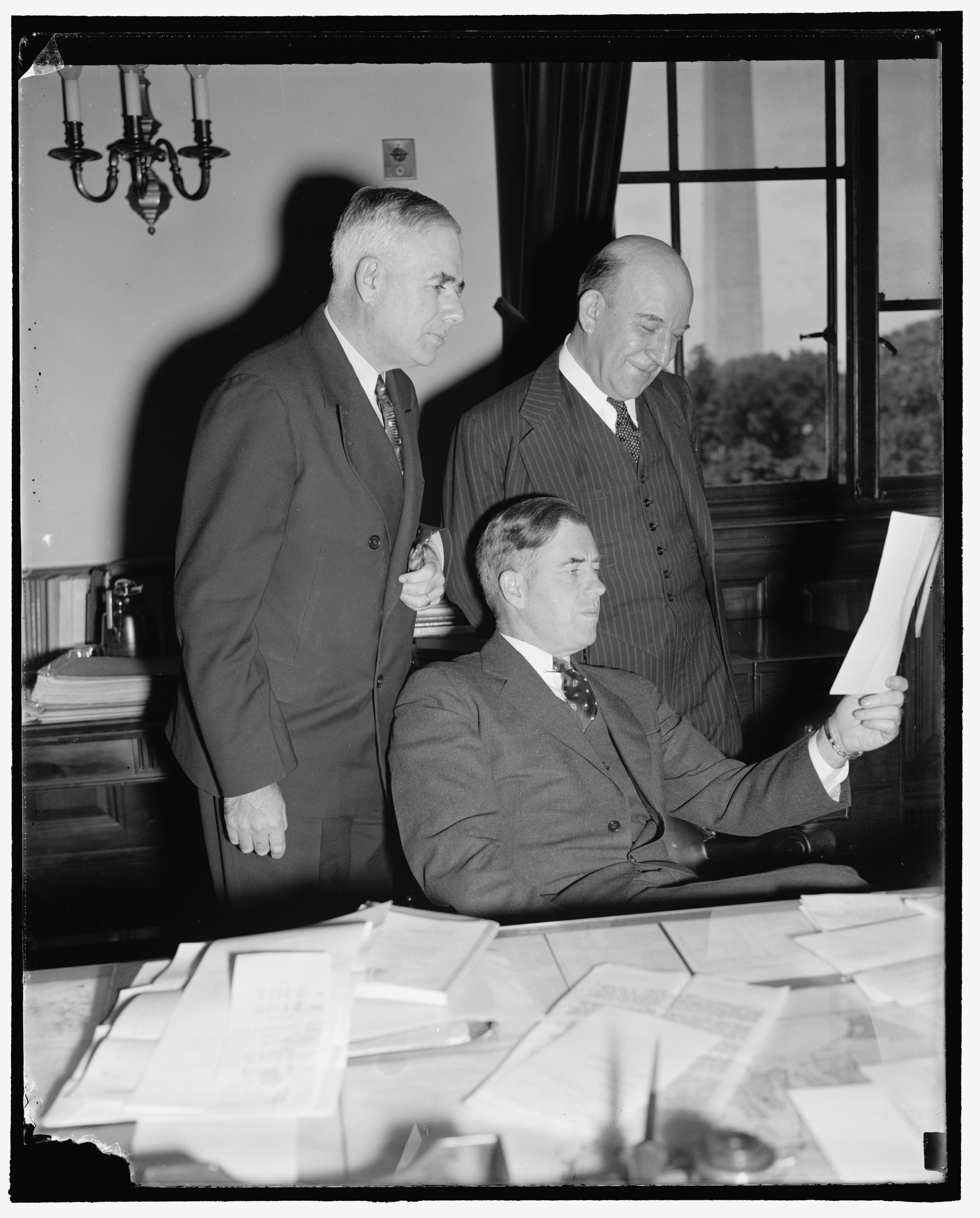
Directors of U.S. farm policy in 1938, from left: M. L. Wilson, Undersecretary of Agriculture; Secretary of Agriculture Henry A. Wallace; and Howard R. Tolley, Administrator of the Agricultural Adjustment Administration

By 1910, Wilson became the Assistant State Agronomist at Montana State College at Bozeman from 1910 to 1912. In this capacity, he helped new settlers adapt to the semi-arid climate of Montana, teaching them about dryland tillage methods and crops that did not need irrigation.

Next, he was a county agent in Custer County, Montana from 1912 to 1914, becoming the first county agent in Montana. After the Smith–Lever Act of 1914 passed, he became a Montana State Extension Agent Leader from 1914 to 1922. However, Montana's agricultural boom during World War I came to an end between 1917 and 1920 when an outbreak of wheat leaf rust, drought, and a drop in prices resulted in thousands of families leaving Montana. Wilson took a leave of absence from work in 1919 to attend graduate school in Wisconsin.

The depression of 1921 resulted in farmers demanding price stabilization, domestic allotments, and parity. When Wilson returned to Montana, he focused on the economic needs of the farmers. He interviewed farmers that had remained, despite the failures of their neighbors. His study showed the need for a drastic change in farm management and led to new guidelines for those farming in arid climates. However, Wilson believed more help was needed in Montana. He supported the McNary–Haugen Farm Relief Bill which was passed by Congress two times, but vetoed by President Calvin Coolidge both times.

From 1922 to 1924, Wilson worked as an extension agricultural economist at Montana State College; the first person in Montana to serve in this capacity. His work came to the attention of Beardsley Ruml, director of the Laura Spelman Rockefeller Foundation. With the Foundations support, the Fairway Farms Corporation of Montana organized in 1924, involving Montana farmers, businessmen, and Wilson. Fairway Farms purchased eight test farms in various parts of the state, finding tenants or buyers who were willing to follow the corporation's recommended farming systems and practices.

In 1924, Wilson became the head of the Division of Farm Management and Cost Accounting for the newly formed USDA Bureau of Agricultural Economics (BAE). While reorganizing the BAE division, Wilson was on leave from Montana State College. However, he still spent time in Montana, working on the Fairway Farms project. When Wilson returned to Montana State College in 1926, he became a professor and first head of the department of agricultural economics, serving in that capacity through 1933. In 1929, he visited the Soviet Union to learn from and consult on their large-scale wheat farming.

When the US. Department of Interior's Agricultural Adjustment Administration (AAA) formed in 1933, Wilson transferred and was the Chief Wheat Production Secretary from May 16 to September 1, 1933. From September 1933 to June 30, 1934, he directed the AAA's Subsistence Homesteads Division.

From July 2, 1934, to January 1, 1937, he served as the United States Assistant Secretary of Agriculture. His primary concern was for farmers in the "lower one-third". He contributed to public agricultural policy and programs designed to address drought, the Great Depression, and low incomes. His chief contribution was to help create the first agricultural commodity programs for the United States.

In 1937, he became the Undersecretary of the U.S. Department of Agriculture. One of his legacies from the position was the "training public servants for effective functioning in a democracy." In February 1940, he became Director of Extension Work for the USDA, also filling in with the Production and Marketing Administration and serving as the chief of Child Nutrition Programs in the War Food Administration from 1943 to 1949. With the latter, he worked to promote 4-H and convince the Millers' National Federation to enrich bread and cereals. On behalf o the USDA, Wilson traveled to other countries, sharing knowledge and encouraging students to come to the United States to train and study agricultural methods. He influenced the Ford Foundation and other international agencies regarding programming and funding.

He retired from the government in 1953 but continued to work as a consultant for federal and state programs.

== Professional affiliations ==
Wilson was a member of the American Association for the Advancement of Science and of the American Farm Economic Association, serving as the latter's president in 1925. He was also the secretary and managing director of the Fairway Farms Corporation of Montana. He also served with several foundations that worked on agricultural issues.

Photographs by M. L. Wilson

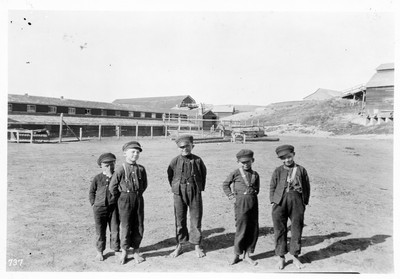
Hutterite Settlement—Children (1922)

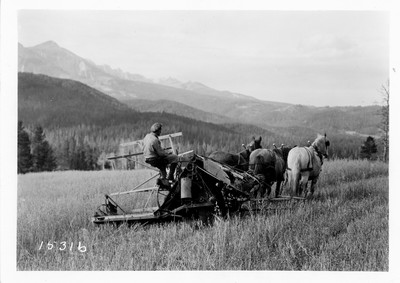
Harvesting methods (1923)

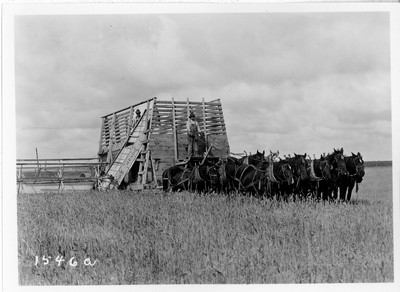
Harvesting—12-Horse team pulling a header (1923)

== Awards and honors ==
- In 1935, Wilson received an Honorary Doctorate from Montana State College
- The Columbia Center for Oral History Research conducted an oral history project with Wilson which is housed at the Columbia University Libraries
- The Milburn Lincoln Wilson Agricultural Photographs Collection is housed at Montana State University
- The M. L. Wilson Papers, 1935–1960, are housed at the Montana State University Library.
- In 1974, Montana State College (now Montana State University) established an annual M. L. Wilson Lecture, co-sponsored by the MSU Wilson Lecture Fund and the university's Department of Agricultural Economics and Economics.

== Publications ==
- Flax Growing in Montana. with F. S. Cooley. Bozeman: Montana Agricultural College, Experiment Station, 1912
- Cropping to Flax on New Lands of Semi-arid Land Areas. with H. L. Bolley. Bozeman: Montana Agricultural College, Experiment Station, 1913
- Flax Cropping, Harvesting Methods. with H. L. Bolley. Bozeman: Montana Agricultural College, Experiment Station, 1914
- Corn Growing in Montana. Bozeman, Mont.: Montana Agricultural College, Experiment Station, 1914
- Corn in Montana: History, Characteristics, Adaptation. with Alfred Atkinson. Bozeman: Montana Agricultural College Experiment Station, 1915
- Suggestions to Alfalfa Growers. with Alfred Atkinson. Bozeman: Montana Agricultural College, Experiment Station, 1915
- Corn in Montana. with Alfred Atkinson. Bozeman: Montana Agricultural College, Experiment Station, 1916
- Selecting and Curing Seed Corn. with Alfred Atkinson. Bozeman: Montana Agricultural College, Experiment Station, 1916
- Corn Planting and Cultivation in Montana. with Alfred Atkinson. Bozeman: University of Montana, Agricultural Experiment Station, 1917
- A Study of Ranch Organization and Methods of Range-cattle Production in the Northern Great Plains Region. Washington, D.C.: U.S. Department of Agriculture, 1928
- Report of Commission Appointed to Report on the Lethbridge Northern and Other Irrigation Districts in Alberta. Alberta: Government of Alberta, 1930
- Farm Relief and the Domestic Allotment Plan. Minneapolis: University of Minnesota Press, 1933
- Democracy Has Roots. Preface by Charles A. Beard. New York: Carrick & Evans, 1939
- A Better Rural Life in South Carolina Through Land Use Planning. [Washington, D.C.]: Cooperative Extension Work in Agriculture and Home Economics, 1940
- "Farmers in a Changing World". Yearbook of Agriculture, 1940.
- The Rural Home and the National Emergency. Washington, D.C.: U.S. Government Printing Office, 1942
- Studies of Rural Social Organization in the United States, Latin America, and Germany. with C. Loomis and C. C. Taylor. East Lansing: State College Book Store, 1945
- Shell Eggs: Quality and Properties as Affected by Temperature and Length of Storage. with Ruth A. Jordan and A. T. Barr. Lafayette, Indiana: Purdue University Agricultural Experiment Station, 1954
- Community Development Programme in India: Report of a Survey. [Delhi?], India: Community Projects Administration, Government of India, 1956
- Wilson and the Campaign for the Domestic Allotment. with William D. Rowley. Lincoln, Nebraska: University of Nebraska Press, 1970

=== Contributions to other works ===
- The Federal Government Today; a Survey of Recent Innovations and Renovations. Morris Bartel Schnapper and Frances Perkins, editors. United States: American Council on Public Affairs, 1938
- Thomas Jefferson. Papers Read Before the American Philosophical Society in Celebration of the Bicentennial of Thomas Jefferson, Third President of the Society. United States: American Philosophical Society, 1943

== Personal life ==
On December 17, 1913, Wilson married Ida Morse of Cromwell, Minnesota. The couple had one daughter. Wilson went to the Mayo Clinic for treatment for his stomach ulcers and became very interested in nutrition. Wilson and his family left Montana and moved to Washington, D.C., in 1933. He was a Unitarian and a member of the Cosmos Club.

In 1969, Wilson died in Washington at the age of 84 years after injuries from a fall. His funeral service was held in Bethesda, Maryland. His grave lies in Rock Creek Cemetery.

== See also ==
- Agricultural Adjustment Act
- New Deal
- Fair Deal
