= Karl Taylor =

Karl Taylor may refer to:

- Karl G. Taylor Sr., Medal of Honor recipient
- Karl Taylor (boxer), see Tontcho Tontchev
- Karl Taylor (ice hockey), ice hockey coach

== See also ==
- Carl Taylor (disambiguation)
