= Isaac H. Doutrich =

American politician

Member of the U.S. House of Representatives from Pennsylvania's 19th district
- In office March 4, 1927 – January 3, 1937
- Preceded by: Joshua William Swartz
- Succeeded by: Guy J. Swope

Personal details
- Born: December 19, 1871 Middletown, Pennsylvania, U.S.
- Died: May 28, 1941 (aged 69) Harrisburg, Pennsylvania, U.S.
- Party: Republican

Isaac Hoffer Doutrich (December 19, 1871 – May 28, 1941) was a Republican member of the U.S. House of Representatives from Pennsylvania.

He was born on a farm near Middletown, Pennsylvania. He moved to Elizabethtown, Pennsylvania, with his parents in 1880. He attended Keystone State Normal School in Kutztown, Pennsylvania. He worked in the retail clothing business in Middletown and Harrisburg, Pennsylvania. He was also interested in banking and other businesses. He served as a member of the Harrisburg city council from 1924 to 1927.

Doutrich was elected as a Republican to the Seventieth and to the four succeeding Congresses. He ran unsuccessfully for reelection in 1936. After his time in Congress, he reengaged in the retail clothing business in Harrisburg until his death. Interment in the East Harrisburg Cemetery.

Asked how to say his name, he told The Literary Digest: "Rimes with thou Greek: dou-treek'." (Charles Earle Funk, What's the Name, Please?, Funk & Wagnalls, 1936.)

== Sources ==
- United States Congress. "Isaac H. Doutrich (id: D000460)". Biographical Directory of the United States Congress.
- The Political Graveyard

U.S. House of Representatives
Preceded by Joshua W. Swartz	Member of the U.S. House of Representatives from Pennsylvania's 19th congressional district 1927–1937	Succeeded by Guy J. Swope
