= Joshua W. Swartz =

American politician

Joshua William Swartz (June 9, 1867 – May 27, 1959) was an American lawyer and politician. A member of the Republican Party, he was elected to the U.S. House of Representatives from the Commonwealth of Pennsylvania.

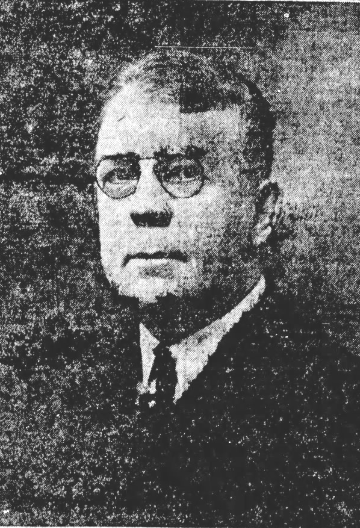
Joshua Swartz (c.1924)

== Formative years ==
Born in Lower Swatara Township, Pennsylvania, just west of Harrisburg, Pennsylvania, on June 9, 1867, Joshua W. Swartz was raised on his father's farm, and attended the rural schools, Lebanon Valley College, and Williamsport Commercial School. He graduated from the law department of Dickinson College in Carlisle, Pennsylvania in 1892.

== Career ==
Admitted to the bar in 1892, he began his legal practice in Harrisburg, and subsequently became a member of the Pennsylvania State House of Representatives, serving in that capacity from 1915 to 1917.

Swartz was elected as a Republican to the Sixty-ninth Congress. He declined to become a candidate for reelection in 1926, and resumed the practice of law until his death in Harrisburg on May 27, 1959. He was buried at the Paxtang Cemetery near Harrisburg.

U.S. House of Representatives
Preceded by Frank C. Sites	Member of the U.S. House of Representatives from Pennsylvania's 19th congressional district 1925–1927	Succeeded by Isaac H. Doutrich
