= John A. Wilson (adjutant general) =

Adjutant General of Puerto Rico
- In office 1919 – December 2, 1938
- Governor: Arthur Yager; Emmet Montgomery Reily; Horace Mann Towner; Theodore Roosevelt Jr. James Rumsey Beverley; Robert Hayes Gore; Blanton C. Winship
- Preceded by: Office established
- Succeeded by: Luis R. Esteves

Commissioner of the Interior of Puerto Rico
- In office 1910–1914

Commissioner of the Interior of Puerto Rico
- In office 1921–1923

Personal details
- Born: December 1861 West Virginia, United States
- Died: December 2, 1938 (age 77) San Juan, Puerto Rico

Military service
- Allegiance: United States
- Branch/service: Army National Guard
- Rank: Major
- Unit: Puerto Rico National Guard
- Commands: Puerto Rico National Guard

John A. Wilson (December 1861 – December 2, 1938) was an American engineer and military officer who served as the first Puerto Rico Adjutant General, commanding the Puerto Rico National Guard, from 1919 until his death in 1938. He was appointed by Governor Arthur Yager following the establishment of the Puerto Rico National Guard, serving until his death, after which he was succeeded by Luis R. Esteves.

== Early life and engineering career ==
Born in West Virginia around 1861, Wilson moved with his family to Asheville, North Carolina, where his father was a contractor. He began working as an engineer at an early age, assisting with the installation of the first telephones in Richmond, Virginia, at the age of 15. By age 21, he had become a practical engineer, despite an absence of formal education in the field. Wilson partnered with others to form the New York engineering firm of J. G. White & Company, where he supervised construction projects, including, in 1892, the electrification of the New Orleans street railway system. He subsequently supervised the electrification of the Baltimore street railway system, and in 1895 oversaw the electrification of the system in Buffalo, New York, with power generated at Niagara Falls.

In 1898, following the Spanish–American War, Wilson moved to Puerto Rico to supervise the conversion of the existing steam-powered tramway serving San Juan to electric operation. He stayed to participate in the development of the Southern Cross Fruit Company plantation, owned by investors in New York. In 1910, President William Howard Taft appointed Wilson to serve as Commissioner of the Interior of Puerto Rico, which position Wilson held until 1914, during which he planned and oversaw the construction of numerous highways on the island. In 1917, he directed the World War I administration of the military draft in Puerto Rico, and later served as supervisor of elections, and in a second term as Commissioner of the Interior from 1921 to 1923.

== Military career ==
During World War I, Puerto Ricans served in the 373rd, 374th, and 375th Infantry Regiments of the National Army and the Puerto Rican Regiment of the Regular Army. Approximately 20,000 troops were trained at Camp Las Casas. The young Puerto Rican officer, Luis Raúl Estevez, thought a Puerto Rican National Guard was needed. As the first Puerto Rican to graduate from the US Military Academy at West Point, he had learned about military units in other states. He discussed the issue with the governor of Puerto Rico, Arthur Yager, soon after the conclusion of World War I. The governor, Legislature of Puerto Rico, and US Congress approved the plan, and the National Guard was organized in 1919.

On July 19, 1919, Congress passed a law approving the budget for the following year to meet the requirements of the National Defense Act of 1916. Wilson helped secure congressional authorization for the organization of the Puerto Rico National Guard and assisted in its formation. Adjutant General John Wilson was given command over the nascent organization. The Adjutant is a military rank or appointment. The position did not require that Wilson hold the rank of general. The appointment of the Adjutant of Puerto Rico was the responsibility of the Governor. As such, he assisted the Governor in military matters. On July 19, 1919, the United States Department of War informed Yager about the administration's intention of supporting a local reserve pursuant to the statutes of this law to create a permanent national guard that was capable of assisting the other branches of the military or working independently. The entity resumed operation and was meant to receive an infantry brigade, with artillery, cavalry, engineering and specialized troops.

During Wilson's tenure, the Puerto Rico National Guard developed its initial infantry organization, redesignated the 295th Infantry Regiment in 1923. In September 1928, the unit, under Wilson's leadership, was mobilized to assist in the aftermath of the San Felipe hurricane, and in September 1932, it was similarly mobilized to assist in the aftermath of the San Ciprián hurricane. Wilson continued to serve as adjutant general until his death in 1938, and was succeeded by Luis R. Esteves, who served as adjutant general until 1957.

== Personal life and death ==
Wilson had a wife, and was active in the Boy Scouts in Puerto Rico from the time the island's first troop was organized, regularly attending Scout rallies and other activities. He fell ill shortly after attending a Scout luncheon in late November 1938 and died in San Juan on December 2, 1938, following an illness of more than a week. He was a few weeks short of his 77th birthday.
