= Aberdeen Gardens (Hampton, Virginia) =

Historic housing district in Virginia, United States

- U.S. National Register of Historic Places
- U.S. Historic district
- Virginia Landmarks Register
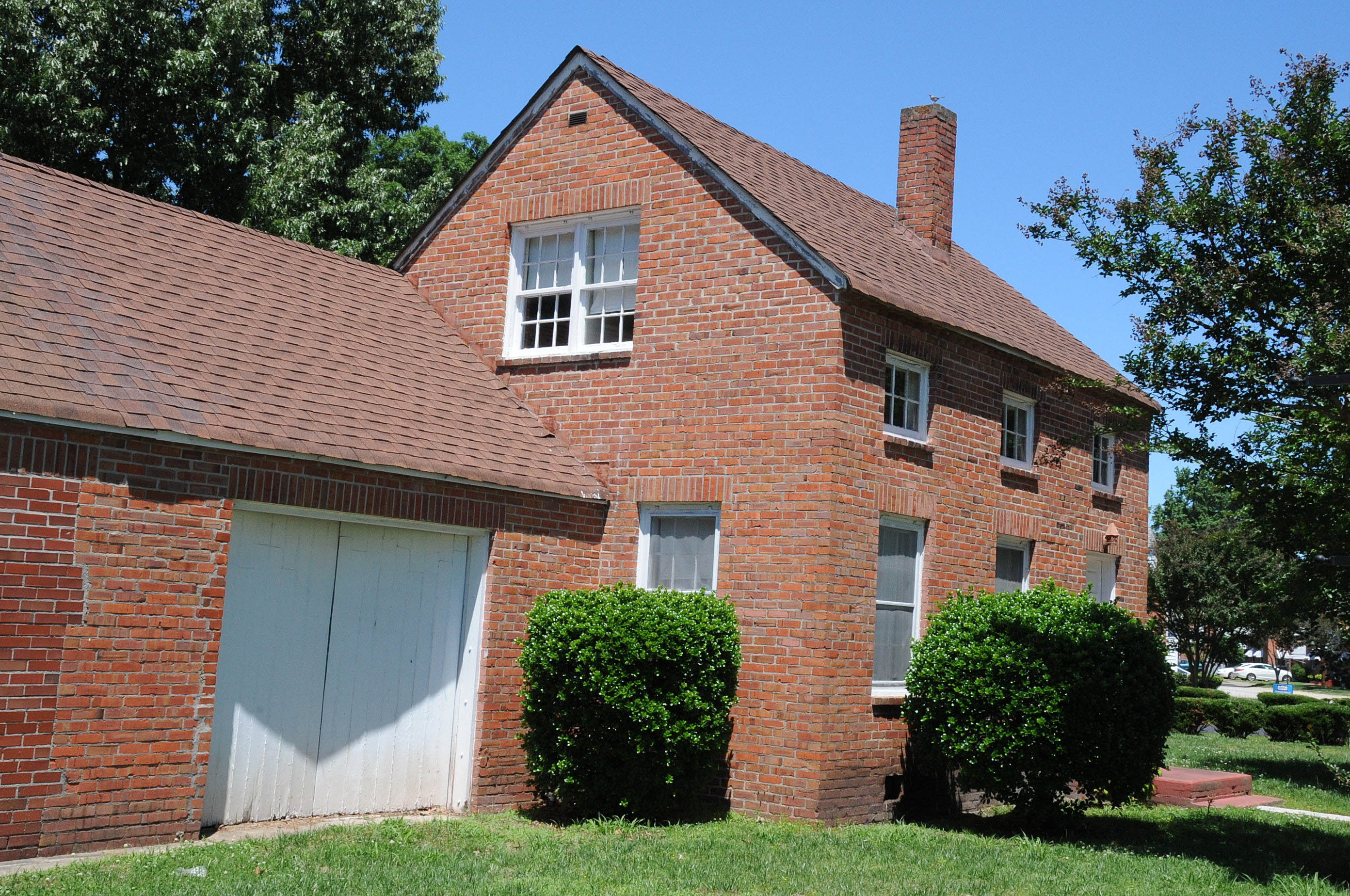

- Location within Virginia Location within the United States
- Location: Roughly bounded by Langston and Mary Peake Blvds., and Russell, Davis, Lewis, Weaver and Walker Rds., Hampton, Virginia
- Coordinates: 37°02′00″N 76°24′21″W
- Area: 110 acres (45 ha)
- Built: 1934
- Architectural style: Colonial Revival, Queen Anne vernacular
- NRHP reference No.: 94000456
- VLR No.: 114-0146

Significant dates
- Added to NRHP: May 26, 1994
- Designated VLR: March 10, 2004

Aberdeen Gardens is a national historic district located at Hampton, Virginia, United States. The district was part of a planned community initiated by Hampton University under New Deal legislation. The neighborhood is listed on the Virginia Landmarks Register and the National Register of Historic Places. The district encompasses 157 contributing buildings.

== Design ==
The community was designed for the resettlement of African American workers in Newport News and Hampton. It was the only such Resettlement Administration community for blacks in Virginia. The seven streets within the community, excluding Aberdeen Road, are named for prominent African Americans: (1) Lewis Road, (2) Weaver Road, (3) Walker Road, (4) Mary Peake Boulevard, (5) Davis Road, (6) Russell Road, and (7) Langston Boulevard. The community is a 440-acre (180 ha) subdivision, including 158 single-family homes, one school, and a commercial center. The community started construction in 1934 and was finished three years later, in 1937.

== Historic designations ==
In 1994, the community was listed as a historic district on the Virginia State Register of Historic Landmarks as well as the National Register of Historic Places. It is also part of the Hampton Roads history tour, the plaque for which reads:

"Built by Negroes for Negroes, Aberdeen Gardens began in 1934 as the model resettlement community for Negro families. It was the only such community in the United States designed by a Negro architect (Hilyard R. Robinson) and built by Negro contractors and laborers. Aberdeen Gardens is composed of 158 brick houses on large garden lots, a school, and a community store, all within a greenbelt. The streets, excepting Aberdeen Road, are named for prominent Negroes. Aberdeen Gardens offered home ownership and an improved quality of life in a rural setting. In 1994 this nationally significant neighborhood was listed as a Virginia landmark and in the National Register of Historic Places, through the efforts of former and current residents."
