= Arthurdale, West Virginia =

Unincorporated community in West Virginia, United States

- Unincorporated community
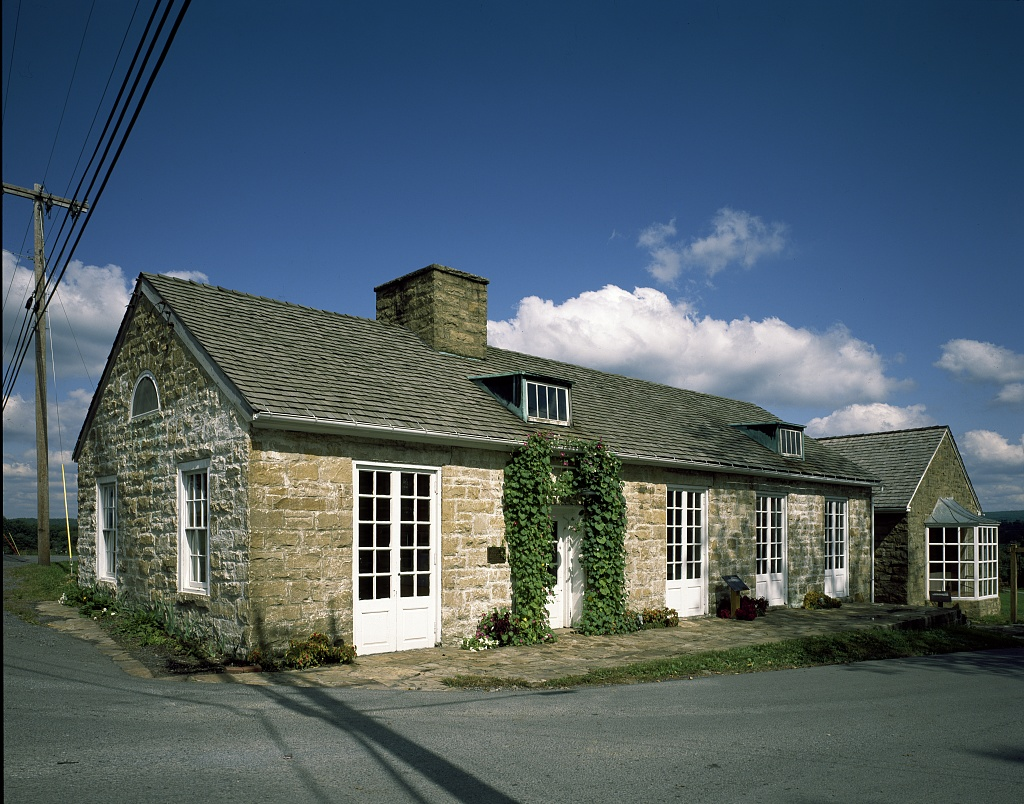
- Administration building

- Location within the state of West Virginia
- Coordinates: 39°29′42″N 79°48′54″W
- Country: United States
- State: West Virginia
- County: Preston
- Elevation: 1,775 ft (541 m)
- Time zone: UTC-5 (Eastern (EST))
  - Summer (DST): UTC-4 (EDT)
- GNIS feature ID: 1553753
- Website: arthurdaleheritage.org
- Arthurdale Historic District
- U.S. National Register of Historic Places
- U.S. Historic district
- Location: E and W of WV 92, Arthurdale, West Virginia
- Area: 1,102 acres (446 ha)
- Built: 1933
- Architect: Gugler, Eric; Wagner, Stewart
- NRHP reference No.: 88001862
- Added to NRHP: February 1, 1989

Arthurdale is an unincorporated community in Preston County, West Virginia, United States. It was built in 1933 at the height of the Great Depression as a social experiment to provide opportunities for unemployed local miners and farmers. Arthurdale was undertaken by the short-lived Subsistence Homesteads Division and with the personal involvement of First Lady Eleanor Roosevelt, who used her influence to win government approval for the scheme. As of the 2020 census, Arthurdale had a population of 1,143.

The aim was to encourage self-sufficiency and reduce dependence on both market forces and welfare provision. The experiment failed through a clash of ideologies, between a strong emphasis on accommodating those most in need yet also having qualifications to ensure that the community would be self-governed in a professional manner. The entrepreneurial community spirit never took hold, and the project is generally remembered as a classic failure, though some of its original residents continued to defend its principles. Arthurdale is now classed as a historic district, with over 100 of the original buildings still standing in addition to a New Deal museum.

== Construction and growth ==
Arthurdale Inn

Arthurdale was named for Richard Arthur, the former owner of the land on which it was built, who sold the land to the federal government under a tax default. Construction began at the end of 1933, and from the outset, it was clear that the Arthurdale community had become one of Eleanor Roosevelt's chief priorities. She intervened with Interior Secretary Harold L. Ickes and with others to ensure that the Arthurdale homes were built with modern necessities such as insulation and indoor plumbing. Eleanor personally chose the refrigerators that went into each home. For some time she acted in the capacity of a manager for Arthurdale, contacting people who could help bring jobs to the community, raising money and awareness, and even monitoring the budgets with a close eye. Roosevelt spent most of her own income on the project in its early years; philanthropist Bernard Baruch was also a major contributor.

On October 12, 1933, the purchase of the Arthurdale land was announced publicly. The press release painted Arthurdale as a "demonstration project" that would help unemployed coal miners. Each family would receive a modest home and enough acreage to raise its own food and crops. Each home would cost about $2,000 and the community was to govern itself, much like small New England towns. There were to be no private employment options, aside from a factory that would provide equipment for the U.S. Post Office.

While Eleanor Roosevelt saw Arthurdale as an exciting new chance for the government to provide destitute citizens with the foundation for successful, self-sufficient lives, the project soon faltered on budgetary and political grounds. The cost of constructing and maintaining the Arthurdale community far exceeded what the government had anticipated and the idea of federally planned communities had never sat well with conservatives. Conservatives condemned it as socialist and a "communist plot," while Democratic members of Congress opposed government competition with private enterprise. Thomas Schall, a U.S. Senator from Minnesota, accused Roosevelt of having her name autographed on furniture produced by the Arthurdale collective, which was then sold for five times the normal price.

From its earliest stages, selecting Arthurdale's homesteaders was a challenging process. Faculty members at nearby West Virginia University were given charge of picking the first round of homesteaders. They wanted at once to help people who desperately needed it, but they also wanted to select only people who would assure the success of the experiment. Arthurdale was not to be a "community of saints, but neither did the University committee feel justified in offering the opportunity to persons whose lack of moral character was likely to jeopardize their ability to contribute to the venture." Similarly, the federal government wanted the first homesteaders to be highly intelligent, capable, and persistent people. In short, not just anyone would be chosen for Arthurdale because only certain kinds of people could make the experiment successful. In the fall of 1933, the selection of the first 50 homesteaders began. Most fundamentally, applicants had to have practical farming knowledge. By October, over 600 applications had been received. In addition to knowing how to farm, homesteaders had to be physically fit, have a certain education and intelligence level, and demonstrate the potential to succeed at Arthurdale. An eight-page questionnaire and follow-up interview were also a part of the process, and those favorable applicants were interviewed in their homes and asked questions about the health and stability of their families.

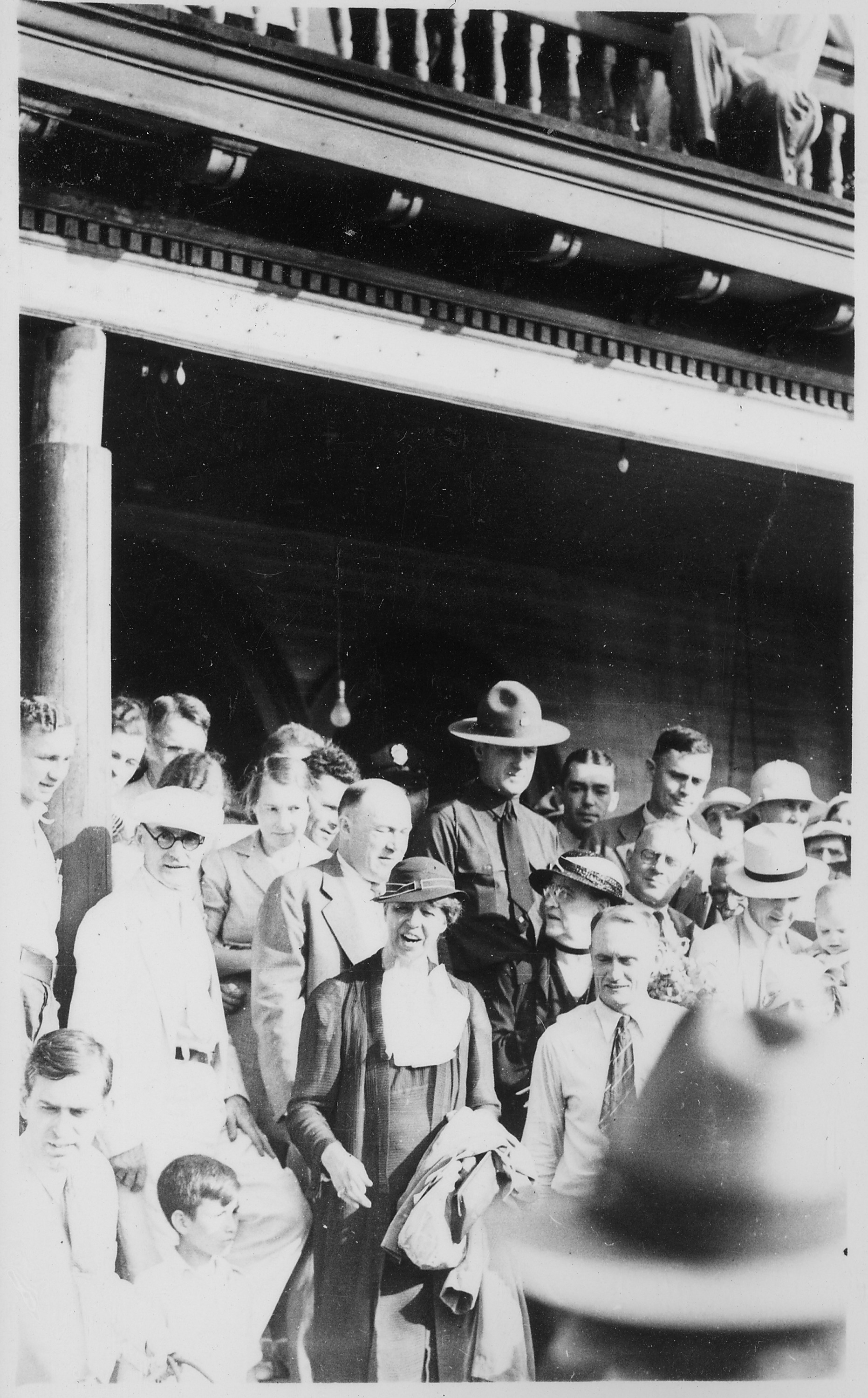
Eleanor Roosevelt speaking at Arthurdale in 1933

Due to these requirements, Arthurdale's homesteaders were by majority white, married couples who had or wanted to have children. Single people and immigrants were excluded because single people could not contribute as fully to the communal life of Arthurdale. Immigrants, with their perceived lack of English skills, could not demonstrate the intelligence and education required to succeed at Arthurdale. Many locals and homesteaders alike wanted Arthurdale to be a place for whites only, but Mrs. Roosevelt disagreed. Despite her feelings, she deferred to local project sponsors. After losing a community vote on the issue, Roosevelt recommended the creation of other communities for the excluded black and Jewish miners. The experience motivated Roosevelt to become much more outspoken on the issue of racial discrimination. In many New Deal agencies and projects, the power of local administrators was hard to overcome. Though legislation was federal, it took local powers-that-be to implement it. Arthurdale was not unique in the nature of locals' racial attitudes.

In 1938, President Franklin D. Roosevelt delivered the only high school commencement address of his presidency at Arthurdale. Eleanor Roosevelt continually visited the area, attending graduations, dances, and other gatherings, but always monitored the progress of construction as well. When the community failed to attract industry, Roosevelt arranged for General Electric to open an operation there. Although General Electric did not stay for long, several other industries such as vacuum cleaner, faucet, and tractor manufacturing as well as military supply industries tried to set up shop in Arthurdale, with only the Sterling Faucet company having a long-term presence. Additionally, most families found it impossible to cultivate sufficient crops to feed themselves, and many remained dependent on the relief system.

The Subsistence Homesteads Division, set up in August 1933, was already dissolved in May 1935 and absorbed into the Resettlement Administration, indicating a shift of government priorities from subsistence homesteads to suburban "greenbelt cities".

== Decline and cancellation ==
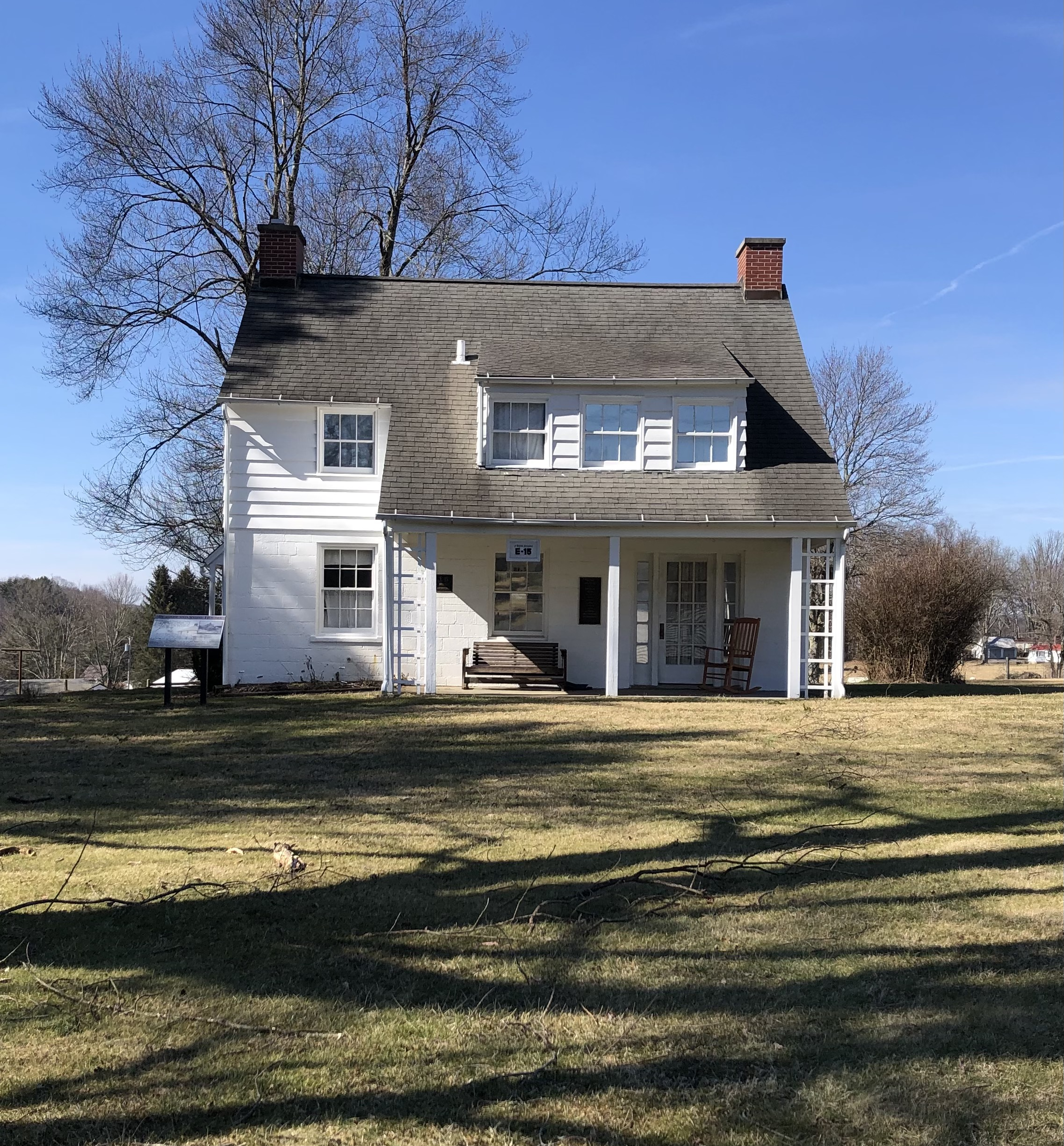
Original "Wagner" style home

By the late 1930s, Arthurdale had lost support in much of Washington, and even though Roosevelt had championed the project, she could not dissuade Congress and the president's cabinet from abandoning it. Roosevelt herself was "deeply disillusioned" by a visit to the community in 1940, in which she observed that the community had become increasingly dependent on government and lacking in independent initiative.

As the United States transferred to a war economy, Arthurdale and the ideas it stood for became less relevant. In 1941, Arthurdale was returned to private ownership, and property was sold to the homesteaders and speculators at a loss. It continued to receive subsidies and be overseen by a manager from the federal government until 1947.

For a variety of reasons, the Arthurdale experiment is identified as a failure. However, Roosevelt personally considered the project a success, later speaking of the many improvements she saw in people's lives there and stating, "I don't know whether you think that is worth half a million dollars. But I do." Eleanor Roosevelt returned to Arthurdale for the last time in 1960 to speak at the dedication ceremony of a new Presbyterian Church. One original resident, Glenna Williams, recalled in 1984 during a fiftieth-anniversary celebration: "I can't see how some people call Arthurdale a failure. It's a wonderful place to live". The community itself continues to exist today, with many of the original structures still in use more than eighty years later. A non-profit organization was formed in 1985 and purchased several buildings. Arthurdale Heritage, Inc. continues to preserve and restore the town. The New Deal Museum there is open year-round.

== Modern community ==
Arthurdale includes a national historic district encompassing 147 contributing buildings, one contributing structure, and one contributing site. As a historic district, it is significant because, at the time of its listing, all 165 houses were extant, as well as the Inn, four of the six factories, the pottery, well house, cemeteries, most of the community center buildings, and the original road system and parking lot. It was listed on the National Register of Historic Places in 1989.

== See also ==
- Eleanor, West Virginia
- Tygart Valley Homesteads Historic District

== Bibliography ==
- Cook, Blanche Wiesen (1999). Eleanor Roosevelt, Vol. 2: 1933–1938. Viking. ISBN 978-0-14-017894-4.
- Goodwin, Doris Kearns (1994). No Ordinary Time. Simon & Schuster. ISBN 978-0-684-80448-4.
- Haid, Richard (1975). Arthurdale: An Experiment in Community Planning, 1933–1947. West Virginia University.
- Badger, Anthony J (1989). The New Deal: The Depression Years, 1933–1940. Ivan R. Dee. ISBN 9781566634533.
- Maloney, C.J. (2013). Back to the Land: Arthurdale, FDR's New Deal, and the Costs of Economic Planning. Wiley. ISBN 978-1118886922.
- Abrams, Nancy L. (2018). The Climb from Salt Lick: A Memoir of Appalachia. Vandalia. ISBN 978-1-946684-18-9.
