= Dailey, West Virginia =

- Census-designated place
- Location within West Virginia Location within the United States
- Coordinates: 38°47′55″N 79°53′46″W
- Country: United States
- State: West Virginia
- County: Randolph

Area
  - Total: 0.506 sq mi (1.31 km^{2})
  - Land: 0.506 sq mi (1.31 km^{2})
  - Water: 0 sq mi (0 km^{2})
- Elevation: 1,969 ft (600 m)

Population (2020)
  - Total: 106
  - Density: 209/sq mi (80.9/km^{2})
- Time zone: UTC-5 (Eastern (EST))
  - Summer (DST): UTC-4 (EDT)
- ZIP code: 26259
- Area codes: 304 & 681
- GNIS feature ID: 1550867

Dailey is a census-designated place (CDP) in Randolph County, West Virginia, United States. Dailey is located on U.S. routes 219 and 250, 3 miles (4.8 km) south-southwest of Beverly. Dailey has a post office with ZIP code 26259. As of the 2020 census, its population was 106 (down from 114 at the 2010 census).

Located near Dailey is the Tygart Valley Homesteads Historic District, listed on the National Register of Historic Places in 2004.

== Climate ==
This climatic region is typified by large seasonal temperature differences, with warm to hot (and often humid) summers and cold (sometimes severely cold) winters. According to the Köppen Climate Classification system, Dailey has a humid continental climate, abbreviated "Dfb" on climate maps.
