= Guy J. Swope =

American teacher, accountant, and politician

Guy Jacob Swope
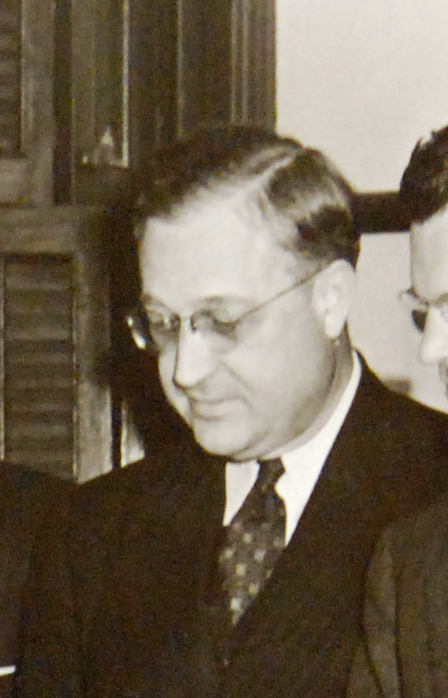
- Swope, c. 1944

Acting Governor of Puerto Rico
- In office February – August 1941
- President: Franklin D. Roosevelt
- Preceded by: José Miguel Gallardo (acting)
- Succeeded by: José Miguel Gallardo (acting)

Member of the U.S. House of Representatives from Pennsylvania's 19th district
- In office January 3, 1937 – January 3, 1939
- Preceded by: Isaac H. Doutrich
- Succeeded by: John C. Kunkel

Personal details
- Born: December 26, 1892 Meckville, Berks County, Pennsylvania, U.S.
- Died: July 25, 1969 (aged 76) New York City, New York, U.S.
- Party: Democratic
- Education: Keystone State Teachers College; Columbia University School of International Affairs
- Profession: teacher, accountant

Guy Jacob Swope (December 26, 1892 – July 25, 1969) was an American teacher, accountant, and Democratic politician. His career included one term as a representative in the 77th United States Congress, serving as a director in the United States Department of Interior under Franklin D. Roosevelt, and serving for a brief period as acting governor of Puerto Rico in 1941. He also served in the United States Naval Reserve, Military Government Branch, where he attained the rank of Commander.

Swope was born in Meckville, Berks County, Pennsylvania and studied in Keystone State Teachers College and Columbia University School of International Affairs. After graduation, he first worked as a teacher in Lebanon County, Pennsylvania and later as an agent for the Internal Revenue Service. In 1935, he became the budgetary secretary for Pennsylvania and served in that position for two years before being elected to congress in 1936. He failed to win re-election in 1938.

He was made auditor of Puerto Rico in 1940 and served in that capacity for only a year before being appointed acting Governor. He only worked as governor for less than a year before becoming a Director in the Division of Territories and Island Possessions for the Department of the Interior.

During the Second World War, he joined the United States Naval Reserve. After the war, he was a civilian chief of the National Government Division in Tokyo, Japan and later as an assistant to the American High Commissioner in Germany.

After the war, Swope returned to political life with a failed bid for re-election to Congress in 1956, but he was appointed Deputy State Treasurer of Pennsylvania from 1961 until his retirement in 1965.

U.S. House of Representatives
Preceded by Isaac H. Doutrich	Member of the U.S. House of Representatives from Pennsylvania's 19th congressional district 1937–1939	Succeeded by John C. Kunkel
Political offices
Preceded by José Miguel Gallardo	Governor of Puerto Rico; February 1941 – August 1941	Succeeded by José Miguel Gallardo
