= José Miguel Gallardo =

Governor of Puerto Rico in 1941

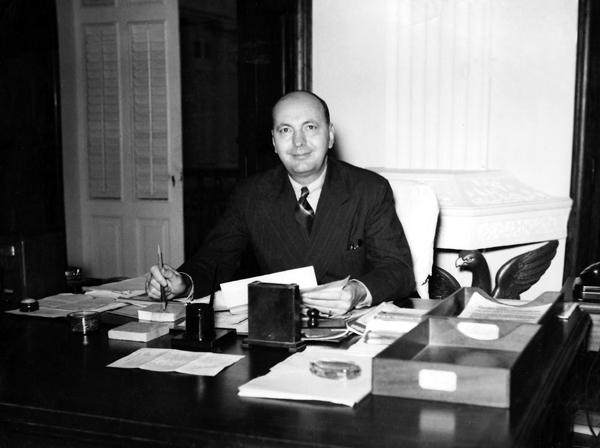
- Gallardo, c. 1940

Acting Governor of Puerto Rico
- In office July 24, 1941 – September 19, 1941
- Preceded by: Guy J. Swope (acting)
- Succeeded by: Rexford Tugwell
- In office November 28, 1940 – February 3, 1941
- Preceded by: William D. Leahy
- Succeeded by: Guy J. Swope (acting)

Personal details
- Born: September 29, 1897 San Germán, Puerto Rico
- Died: July 18, 1976 (aged 79) Río Piedras, Puerto Rico
- Party: Democratic
- Education: Park University (BA); Pennsylvania State University, University Park (MA); University of North Carolina, Chapel Hill (PhD); University of Puerto Rico School of Law (LLB)

Military service
- Branch/service: United States Army
- Years of service: 1918–1919
- Rank: Second Lieutenant
- Battles/wars: World War I

José Miguel Gallardo (September 29, 1897 – July 18, 1976) was a professor at the University of Puerto Rico and two-time acting governor of Puerto Rico. He and his wife, fellow professor Ida Gallardo, lived most of their adult lives in Río Piedras, Puerto Rico.

Graduated from with a Bachelors in Arts from Park College. Received his M.A. degree at Pennsylvania State University.

He is most remembered today as a strong proponent of bilingual education, and he was appointed as Commissioner of Education in 1937 by President Franklin D. Roosevelt. His first task on taking the office was to increase the teaching of English in schools, in preference over Spanish. The intention was that while students would be taught in elementary school in Spanish, they would gradually be taught increasingly in English through high school. His revised education policies were reversed in 1942.

In 1941, he put the island on "war alert" after the Attack on Pearl Harbor.

Political offices
Preceded by William D. Leahy	Governor of Puerto Rico; Acting; 1940–1941	Succeeded by Guy J. Swope
Preceded by Guy J. Swope	Governor of Puerto Rico; Acting; 1941	Succeeded by Rexford Tugwell
