= North American Millers' Association =

Trade association

The North American Millers' Association is a non-profit trade association for the wheat, corn, oat, and rye milling industries. It comprises companies operating grain mills in the United States and Canada and the companies providing products and services to the mills.

== Formation ==
The North American Millers' Association is headquartered in Washington, D.C. The Association was founded in April 1998 with the merger of the former Millers National Federation (wheat flour millers, established 1902), the American Corn Millers' Federation (corn dry millers, established 1918), and Protein Grain Products International (processors of grain products used in U.S. food aid programs). The American Oat Growers Association merged with the organization in 2000.

== Issues ==
In 2002, the North American Millers' Association called for an exemption to the global ban on the pesticide methyl bromide, claiming that the ban would cost the industry $60 million per year.
