= Shenandoah Homesteads Project, Virginia =

Unincorporated community in Virginia, US

Coordinates: 38°46′46″N 78°07′45″W

Shenandoah Homesteads Project is an unincorporated community in Rappahannock County, in the U.S. state of Virginia.
