= Rexford Tugwell =

American economist and academic (1891–1979)

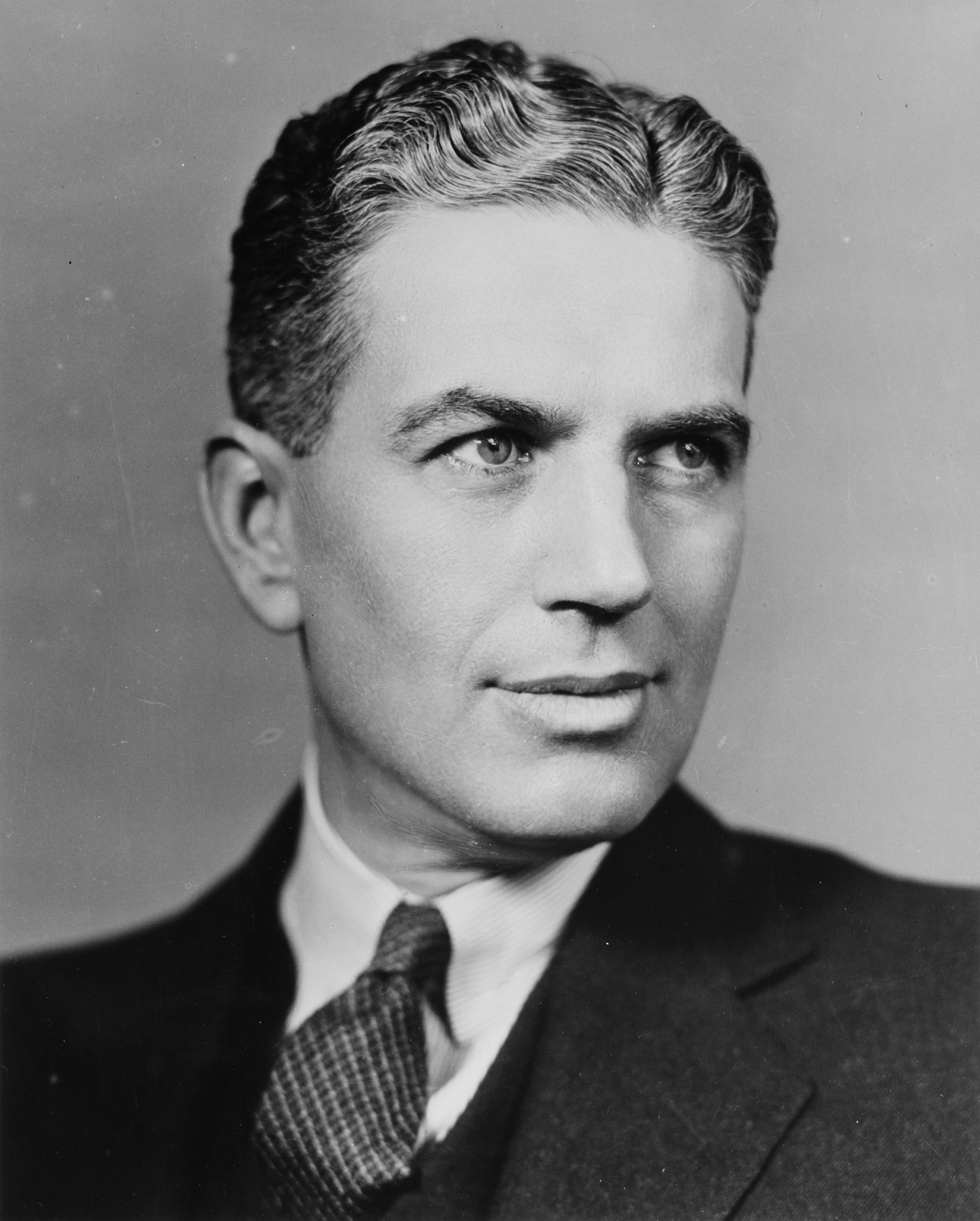
- Tugwell c. 1935–1936

Governor of Puerto Rico
- In office September 19, 1941 – September 2, 1946
- President: Franklin D. Roosevelt; Harry S. Truman
- Preceded by: José Miguel Gallardo
- Succeeded by: Jesús T. Piñero

Chairman of the New York City Planning Commission
- In office April 9, 1938 – September 19, 1941
- Appointed by: Fiorello La Guardia
- Preceded by: Adolf A. Berle
- Succeeded by: Lawrence M. Orton

Administrator of the Resettlement Administration
- In office May 1, 1935 – November 18, 1936
- Appointed by: Franklin D. Roosevelt
- Preceded by: Position established
- Succeeded by: Will W. Alexander

Under Secretary of Agriculture
- In office June 18, 1934 – November 18, 1936
- President: Franklin D. Roosevelt
- Preceded by: Office established
- Succeeded by: M. L. Wilson

Assistant Secretary of Agriculture
- In office March 7, 1933 – June 18, 1934
- President: Franklin D. Roosevelt
- Preceded by: Renick William Dunlap
- Succeeded by: M. L. Wilson

Personal details
- Born: Rexford Guy Tugwell; July 10, 1891 Sinclairville, New York, U.S.
- Died: July 21, 1979 (aged 88) Santa Barbara, California, U.S.
- Party: Democratic
- Other political affiliations: Progressive (1948)
- Spouse(s): Florence Arnold (m. 1914; div. 1938) Grace E. Falke (m. 1938)
- Children: Tanis; Marcia; Tyler; Franklin
- Education: The Wharton School; Columbia University
- Profession: Economist; Academician

Rexford Guy Tugwell (July 10, 1891 – July 21, 1979) was an American economist who became part of Franklin D. Roosevelt's first "Brain Trust", a group of Columbia University academics who helped develop policy recommendations leading up to Roosevelt's New Deal. Tugwell served in FDR's administration until he was forced out in 1936.

Tugwell was a specialist on planning and believed the government should have large-scale plans to move the economy out of the Great Depression because private businesses were too frozen in place to do the job. He helped design the New Deal farm program and the Resettlement Administration that moved subsistence farmers into small rented farms under close supervision. His ideas on suburban planning resulted in the construction of Greenbelt, Maryland, with low-cost rents for relief families. He was denounced by conservatives for advocating state-directed economic planning to overcome the Great Depression.

Roosevelt appointed Tugwell as the governor of Puerto Rico in 1941. He served until 1946, and was the last non-Puerto Rican to become governor of the territory, and the penultimate appointed governor of Puerto Rico.

He became a professor at various universities, with lengthy service at the University of Chicago and the University of California at Santa Barbara. He wrote 20 books, covering the politics of the New Deal, biographies of major politicians, issues in planning, and memoirs of his experiences.

== Early life and education ==
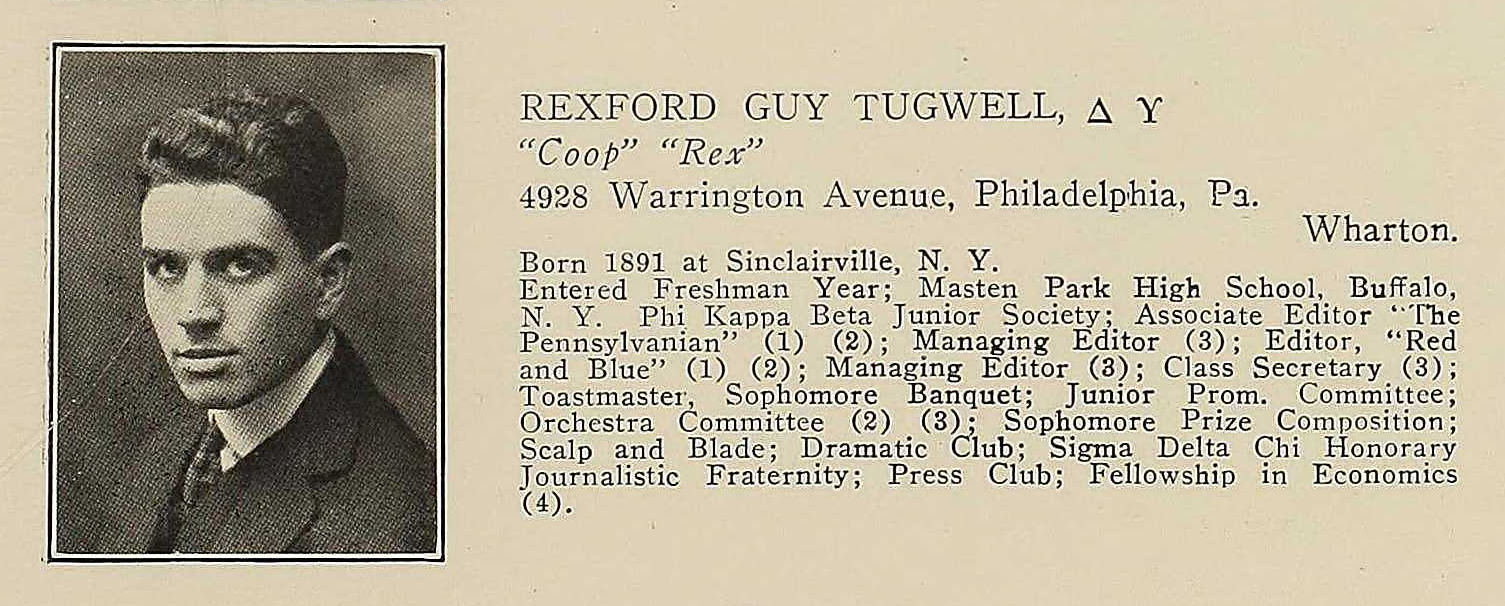
Tugwell in the University of Pennsylvania yearbook, 1915

Rexford Tugwell was born in 1891 in Sinclairville, New York. In his youth, he gained an appreciation for workers' rights and liberal politics from the works of Upton Sinclair, James Bryce, Edward Bellamy, Frederick Winslow Taylor, and Charles Richard van Hise. Tugwell began studying economics in graduate work at the Wharton School of the University of Pennsylvania and completed his doctorate at Columbia University. At university, he was influenced by the teaching of Scott Nearing and Simon Patten, as well as the writings of John Dewey in philosophy.

== Career ==
=== Academic economist ===
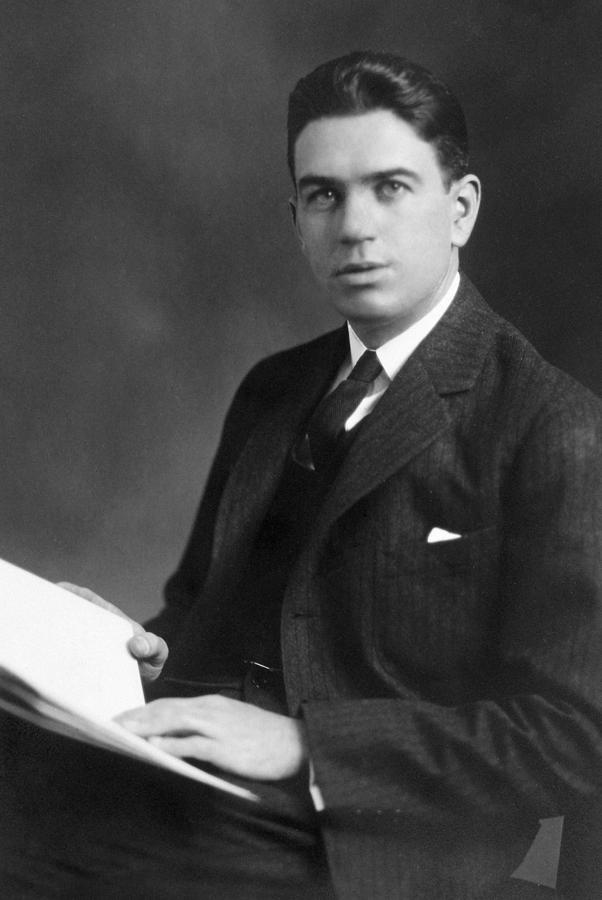
Tugwell in 1922

After graduation, Tugwell served as junior faculty at the University of Washington, American University in Paris, and Columbia University. At Columbia University he taught economics from 1920 to 1932.

Tugwell's approach to economics was experimentalist, and he viewed the industrial planning of World War I as a successful experiment. He advocated agricultural planning (led by industry) to stop the rural poverty that had become prevalent due to a crop surplus after the First World War. This method of controlling production, prices, and costs was especially relevant as the Great Depression began.

=== Roosevelt administration ===
In 1932, Tugwell was invited to join President Franklin Roosevelt's team of advisers known as the Brain Trust. After Roosevelt's inauguration in 1933, Tugwell was appointed first as Assistant Secretary of Agriculture, serving from March 7, 1933, to June 18, 1934. He then served as Undersecretary of Agriculture. He helped create the Agricultural Adjustment Administration (AAA) and served as its director. The AAA included a domestic allotment program, which paid farmers to reduce their production voluntarily by roughly 30% so that reduced supply would increase the price they received. It was funded with a tax on processing companies that used farm commodities. Tugwell's department managed the production of key crops by adjusting the subsidies for nonproduction. The act was ruled unconstitutional by the Supreme Court in 1936 in United States v. Butler and had to be replaced in 1938.

Tugwell was also instrumental in creating the Soil Conservation Service in 1933, to restrict cultivation, restore poor-quality land, and introduce better agricultural practices to farmers to conserve the soil. This was especially necessary given the widespread damage of the 1930s' Dust Bowls. He additionally played a key role in crafting the 1938 Federal Food, Drug, and Cosmetic Act.

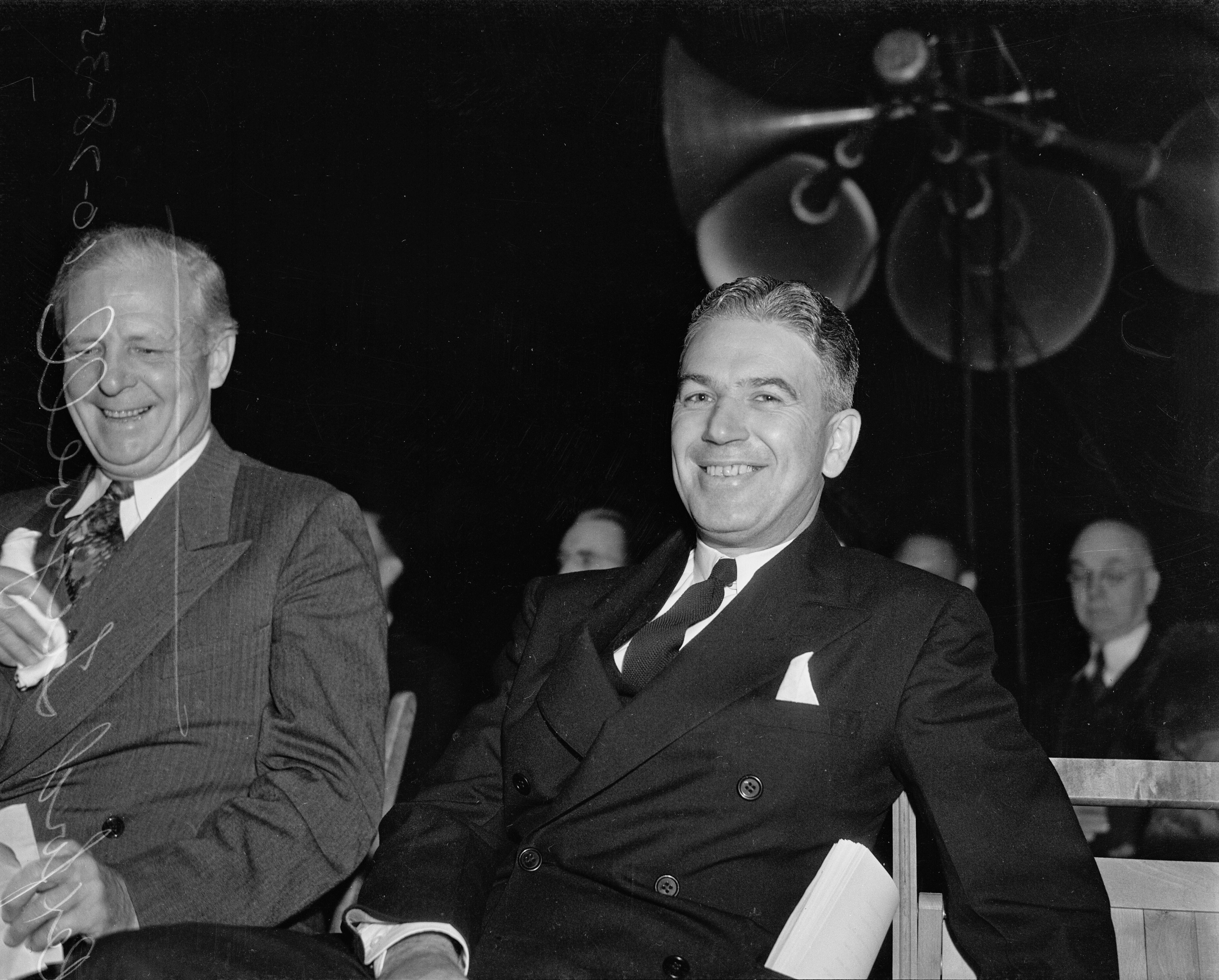
Tugwell (right) with California State Senator Culbert Olson at the Olympic Auditorium in Los Angeles, October 28, 1935

In April 1935, Tugwell and Roosevelt created the Resettlement Administration (RA), a unit of the Federal Emergency Relief Administration. Directed by Tugwell, the RA sought to create healthy communities for the rural unemployed by relocating them to new communities for access to urban opportunities. Some of the RA's activities dealt with land conservation and rural aid, but the construction of new suburban satellite cities was the most prominent. In her book, The Death and Life of Great American Cities, author Jane Jacobs critically quotes Tugwell on the program: "My idea is to go just outside centers of population, pick up cheap land, build a whole community and entice people into it. Then go back into the cities and tear down whole slums and make parks of them." She believed that he underestimated the strengths of complex urban communities and caused too much social displacement in "tearing down" neighborhoods that might have been renovated. This resulted in greater damage to inner city neighborhoods.

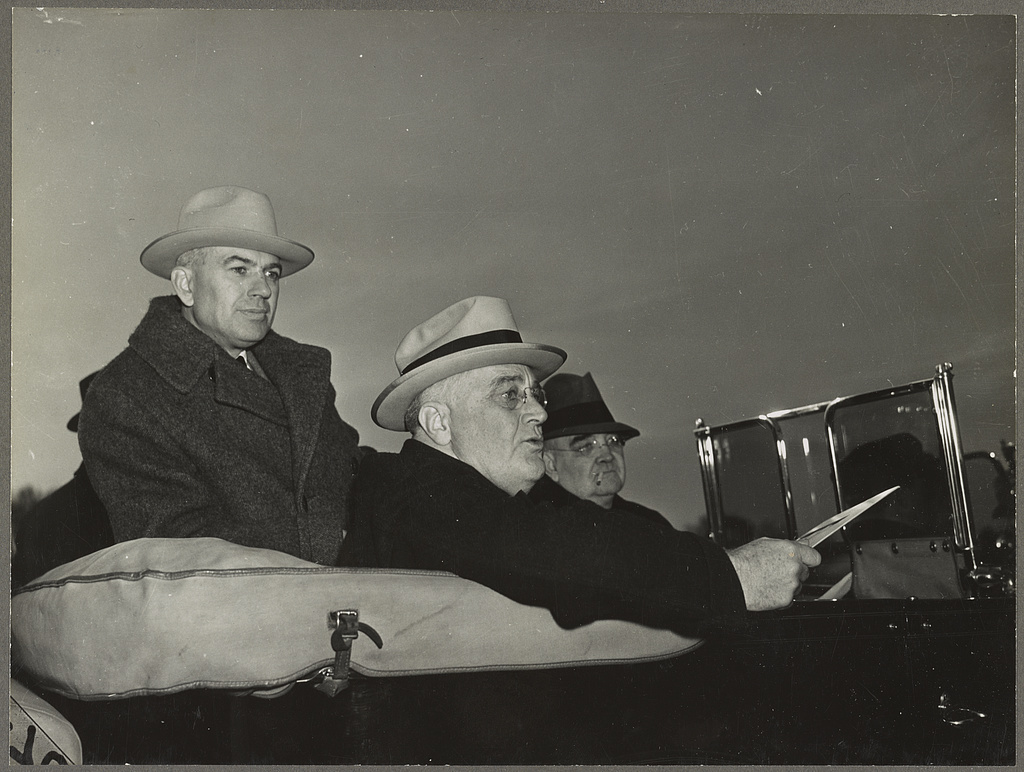
Tugwell and President Roosevelt inspecting the construction progress at the Greenbelt, Maryland town site, in February 1937

The RA completed three "Greenbelt" towns before the United States Court of Appeals for the District of Columbia Circuit found the program unconstitutional in Franklin Township v. Tugwell. It ruled that housing construction was a state power, and the RA was an illegal delegation of the Federal Emergency Relief Administration's power.

Tugwell had previously been denounced as "Rex the Red". The RA's suburban resettlement program earned him condemnation as Communist and un-American because of its social planning aspects. Historians agree that he did not share a Communist affiliation or intelligence ties.

=== American Molasses Co. ===
Given the opposition to his policies, Tugwell resigned from the Roosevelt administration at the end of 1936. He was appointed as a vice president at the American Molasses Co. At this time, he divorced his first wife and married Grace Falke, his former assistant.

=== Director of New York City Planning Commission ===
In 1938, Tugwell was appointed as the first director of the New York City Planning Commission. New York's reformist mayor, Fiorello LaGuardia, created the commission as part of a city charter reform aimed at reducing corruption and inefficiency. The planning commission had relatively limited powers; all actions needed approval from the legislative New York City Board of Estimate. Tugwell tried to assert the commission's power, to retroactively enforce nonconforming land uses, despite a lack of public or legal support. His commission sought to establish public housing at moderate densities, yet repeatedly approved FHA requests for greater density. Robert Moses killed Tugwell's proposed 50-year master plan with a fiery public denouncement of its open-space protections.

=== Governor of Puerto Rico ===
Tugwell served as the last appointed American governor of Puerto Rico, from 1941 to 1946. He worked with the legislature to create the Puerto Rico Planning, Urbanization, and Zoning Board in 1942. Tugwell supported Puerto Rican self-government through amendment to the Organic Act in 1948, he but fiercely opposed decentralizing government agencies and services away from the city of San Juan "despite most Puerto Ricans in need of such services not residing in the capital." In one case, he vetoed a bill approved by both chambers of the Puerto Rico Legislature, and supported by 59 of 77 (Note: Florida was not yet a municipality) municipalities, establishing a state medical school in the city of Ponce, calling it "regionalism". He publicly supported Luis Muñoz Marín's Popular Democratic Party, which wanted a Commonwealth status.

As he prepared to retire from the governorship, Tugwell was instrumental in getting the first Puerto Rican appointed to the job, Jesús T. Piñero, then serving as Resident Commissioner in Washington, DC. Tugwell also served as chancellor of the University of Puerto Rico.

=== Return to academia ===
After his stint as governor, Tugwell returned to teaching at a variety of institutions. He had years of service at the University of Chicago, where he helped develop its planning program. He moved to Greenbelt, Maryland, one of the new suburbs designed and built by the RA under his direction.

After the atomic bombings of Hiroshima and Nagasaki, Tugwell believed that global planning was the only sure way to prevent a nuclear apocalypse. He participated in the Committee to Frame a World Constitution from 1945 to 1948. He also thought the national constitution needed to be amended to enable economic planning.

=== Progressive Party (1948) ===
In 1948, Tugwell served as chair of the platform committee for the Progressive Party. During its convention (July 23–25, 1948), he recounted a conversation with then-presidential candidate Franklin D. Roosevelt in 1942 during which Roosevelt warned him of internal clashes that might destroy the Democratic Party, but might also create a "Progressive Party", adding in his own words that Roosevelt "would have led a movement like that which we now join." Tugwell pled for party unity under a platform that The New York Times summed up as "endorsing Red foreign policy".

=== Later life ===
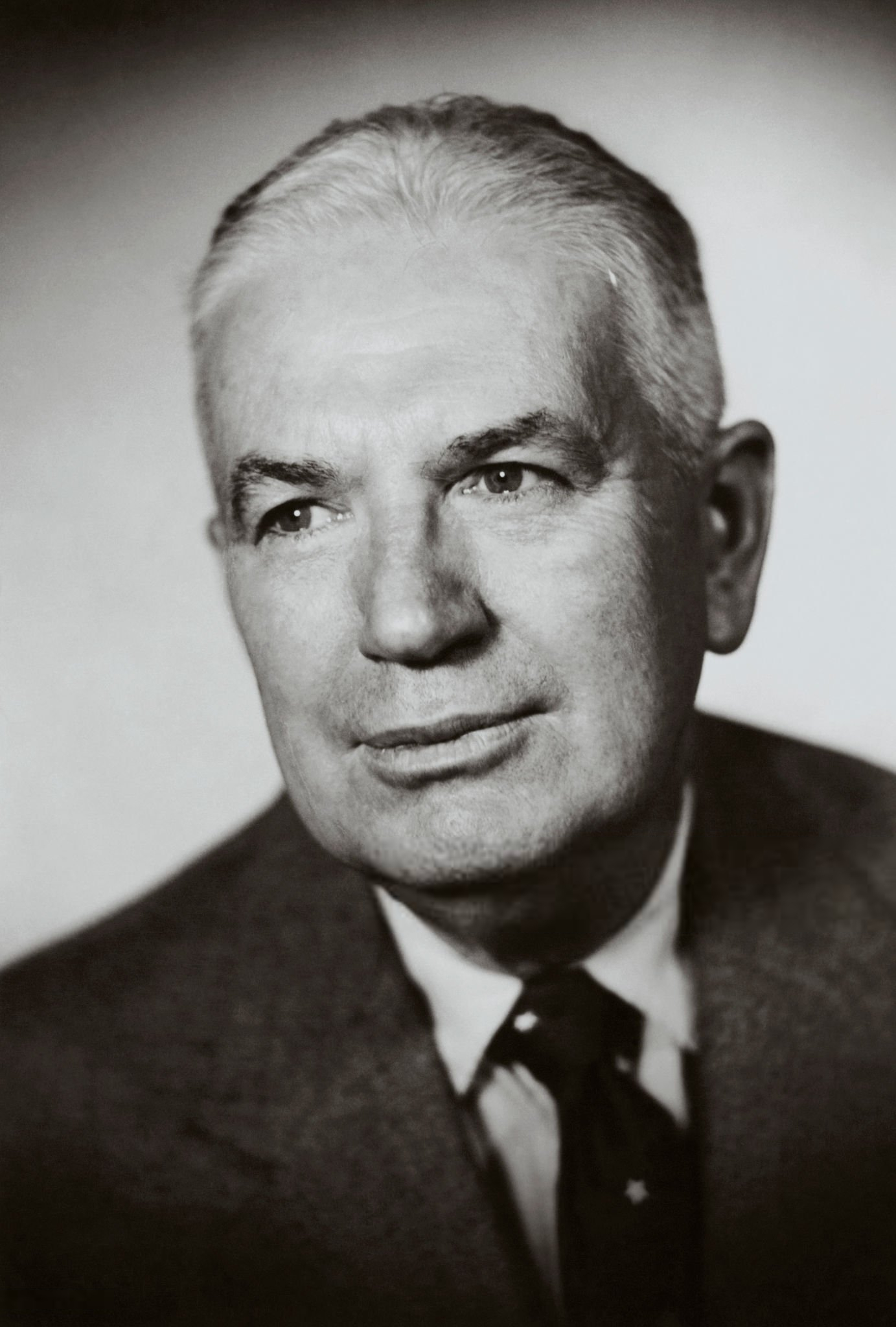
Tugwell c. 1960

Late in life, Tugwell drafted a constitution for the Newstates of America. In it, planning would become a new branch of federal government, alongside the regulatory and electoral branches. During this time, he wrote several books, including a biography of Grover Cleveland, subtitled: A Biography of the President Whose Uncompromising Honesty and Integrity Failed America in a Time of Crisis (1968). His biography of Franklin D. Roosevelt was entitled FDR: An Architect of an Era. A Stricken Land was his memoir about his years in Puerto Rico. This book was reprinted in 2007 by the Muñoz Marín Foundation.

== Representation in other media ==
- Tugwell is mentioned in the Ernie Pyle book, Home Country.
- Philip K. Dick's novel, The Man in the High Castle (1962), set in an alternate world where the United States was conquered by Germany and Japan, features a novel within a novel, The Grasshopper Lies Heavy. In it, Tugwell was elected President of the United States in 1940, succeeding Roosevelt, and received much of the credit for the Allied victory in World War II, after which the U.S. enters a Cold War with an intact, expansionist British Empire rather than the Soviet Union.
- Portrayed by Craig Welzbacher, Tugwell makes a brief appearance in the 2020 film Mank.
- Tugwell is mentioned in Joan Didion's essay "California Dreaming", included in her 1968 book Slouching Towards Bethlehem.

== Books and articles by Tugwell ==
- The Economic Basis of Public Interest, Menasha, Wisconsin: George Banta Publishing Company, 1922.
- Industry's Coming of Age, New York: Harcourt, Brace, 1927.
- "Russian Agriculture," in Stuart Chase, Robert Dunn, and R. G. Tugwell, eds. Soviet Russia in the second decade: a joint survey by the technical staff of the first American Trade Union Delegation (The John Day Company, 1928)
- "The Principle of Planning and the Institution of Laissez Faire." American Economic Review: Supplement, Papers and Proceedings of the Forty-Fourth Annual Meeting of the American Economic Association (1932) 22#1 pp. 75–92 in JSTOR
- "Experimental Control in Russian Industry." Political Science Quarterly (1928): 161–187. in JSTOR
- Mr. Hoover's Economic Policy, New York: John Day, 1932.
- The Industrial Discipline and the Governmental Arts, New York: Columbia University Press, 1933.
- with Howard Copeland Hill. Our economic society and its problems: a study of American levels of living and how to improve them (NY: Harcourt, Brace, 1934)
- The Battle for Democracy, New York: Columbia University Press, 1935.
- Changing the Colonial Climate: the Story, from His Official Messages, of Governor Rexford Guy Tugwell's Efforts to Bring Democracy to an Island Possession Which Serves the United Nations as a Warbase, selection and explanatory comments by J. San Juan Lear: Bureau of Supplies, Printing, and Transportation, 1942.
- Puerto Rican Public Papers of R. G. Tugwell, Governor, San Juan: Service Office of the Government of Puerto Rico, Printing Division, 1945.
- Forty-Fifth Annual Report of the Governor, 1945, San Juan: Government of Puerto Rico, 1945.
- The Stricken Land: The Story of Puerto Rico, Garden City, New York: Doubleday, 1947. ISBN 978-0-8371-0252-8
- The Place of Planning in Society: Seven Lectures, San Juan: Office of the Government Planning Board, 1954.
- A Chronicle of Jeopardy, 1945–1955, Chicago: University of Chicago Press, 1955.
- The Democratic Roosevelt: A Biography of Franklin D. Roosevelt, Garden City, New York: Doubleday, 1957.
- The Art of Politics, As Practiced by Three Great Americans: Franklin Delano Roosevelt, Luis Munoz Marin, and Fiorello H. LaGuardia, Garden City, New York: Doubleday, 1958.
- The Enlargement of the Presidency, Garden City, New York: Doubleday, 1960.
- The Light of Other Days, Garden City, New York: Doubleday, 1962.
- How They Became President, Simon & Schuster, 1964.
- FDR: An Architect of an Era, Macmillan, 1967.
- The Brains Trust, Viking Press, 1968. ISBN 978-0-670-00273-3
- Grover Cleveland, Macmillan, 1968.
- In Search of Roosevelt, Cambridge, Mass.: Harvard University Press, 1972. ISBN 978-0-674-44625-0
- The Emerging Constitution, Harper's Magazine Press, 1974. ISBN 978-0-06-128225-6.
- The Diary of Rexford G. Tugwell: The New Deal, 1932–1935 (Greenwood, 1992)

Tugwell also wrote the foreword to Edward C. Banfield's first published work, Government Project (Free Press, 1951), a history of one of Tugwell's collective farm programs in California.

Tugwell's autobiographies include The Light of Other Days (1962), To the Lesser Heights of Morningside (1982), The Stricken Land (1947), A Chronicle of Jeopardy (1955), The Brains Trust (1968), Off Course (1971), and Roosevelt's Revolution: The First Year, a Personal Perspective (1977).

== Notes ==
Government offices
Preceded by José Miguel Gallardo	Governor of Puerto Rico; September 19, 1941 – September 2, 1946	Succeeded by Jesus T. Piñero
