= Tygart Valley Homesteads Historic District =

Historic district in West Virginia, United States

- U.S. National Register of Historic Places
- U.S. Historic district
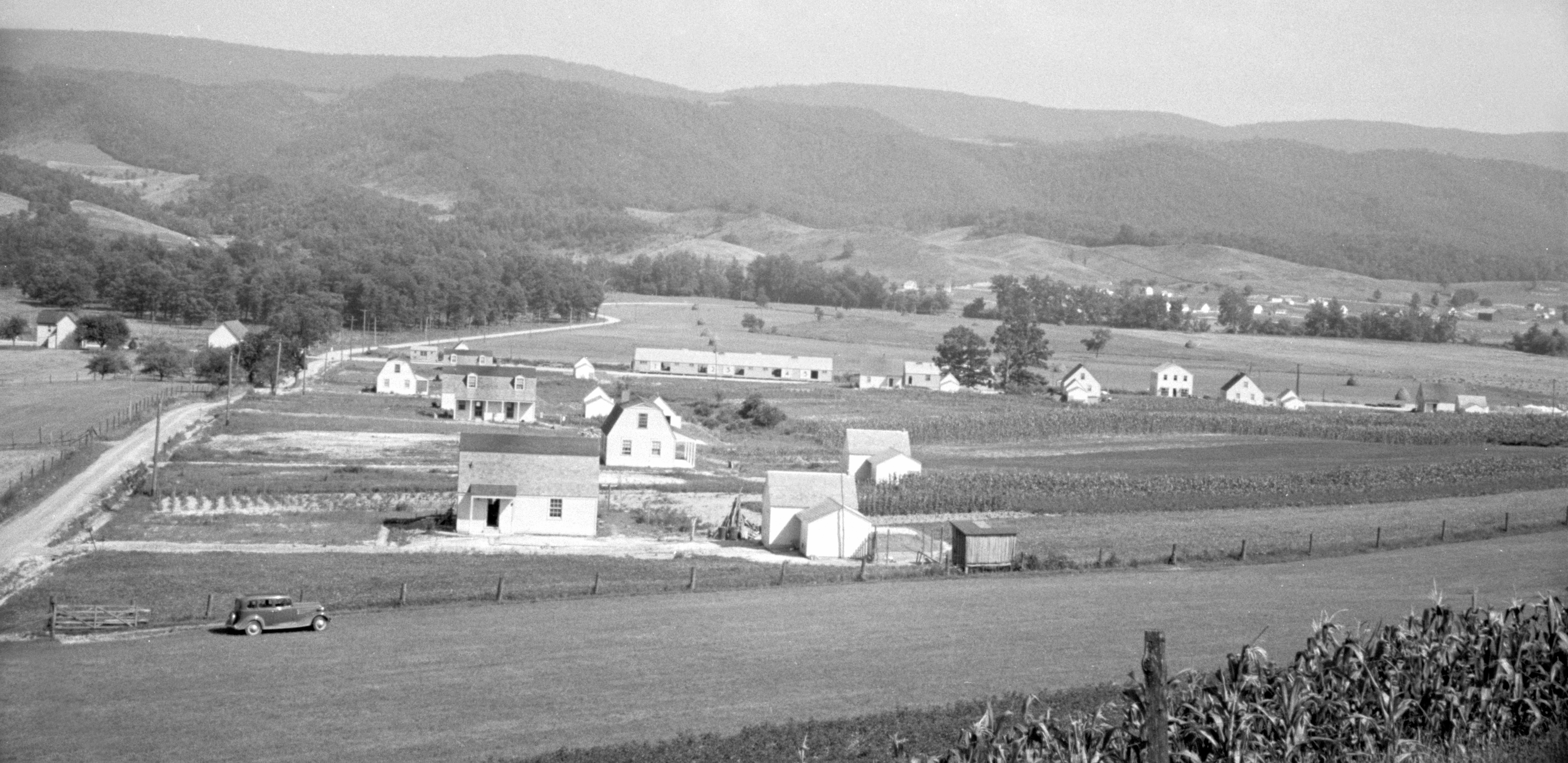
- Tygart Valley Homesteads in August 1936

- Location within West Virginia Location within the United States
- Location: Roughly bounded by U.S. Routes 219/250 and County Roads 21 and 38, near Dailey, West Virginia
- Coordinates: 38°46′37″N 79°54′25″W
- Area: 1,500 acres (610 ha)
- Built: 1940
- Architect: Smith, Benjamin
- Architectural style: Late 19th And 20th Century Revivals, Colonial Revival architecture
- NRHP reference No.: 04000304
- Added to NRHP: July 22, 2004

Tygart Valley Homesteads Historic District is a national historic district located near Dailey, Randolph County, West Virginia. It encompasses 337 contributing buildings, three contributing sites, and three contributing structures, associated with a resettlement community established during the Great Depression by the Roosevelt administration. It was the largest of the three resettlement communities in West Virginia, the others being Arthurdale and Eleanor. The first dwellings were constructed in 1934, and the Civilian Conservation Corps built the public water system, draining systems, and culverts. The houses have modest Colonial Revival architecture details and have either a side gable or gambrel roof, referred to as either an "A-Frame" or "Barn House." Other notable buildings include the Dailey Community Center (1937), gas station (1940), The Homestead School (1939), The East Dailey Bridge (1938), Community Farm, The Warehouse (c. 1935–1936), The Woodworking Shop (c. 1935–1936), and The Weaving Shop (c. 1934).

It was listed on the National Register of Historic Places in 2004.

== See also ==
Tygart Valley River
