= Carl Cleveland Taylor =

American sociologist

- Born: December 16, 1884; Harlan, Virginia, U.S.
- Died: February 10, 1975 (aged 90); Arlington, Virginia, U.S.

Academic background
- Education: Ph.D
- Alma mater: Drake University (BA 1910) University of Texas (MA 1914) University of Missouri (Ph.D 1918)
- Thesis: The Social Survey, Its History and Methods (1918)

Academic work
- Discipline: Sociologist
- Institutions: University of Missouri (1917-1920) State College of Agriculture and Engineering of North Carolina (1920-1930) Bureau of Agricultural Economics (1933-1952)

Carl Cleveland Taylor (16 December 1884 – 10 February 1975) was an American sociologist, demographer, and academic. Taylor served as the thirty-sixth president of the American Sociological Association. Taylor was considered to be an influential figure in the history of rural sociology. After earning his Ph.D in sociology, Taylor taught at several institutions before his dismissal from the State College of Agriculture and Engineering of North Carolina in 1931. From 1935 until his retirement in 1952, Taylor was the division head of the Bureau of Agricultural Economics at the United States Department of Agriculture.

== Early life and education ==
Taylor was born on 16 December 1884 in Harlan, Iowa. Born into a family of farmers, Taylor's father was active in the Farmer's Alliance, which exposed Vance to social movements at a young age. Taylor earned a bachelor's degree from Drake University in 1910 before taking a position at the University of Texas as a public speaking instructor and track and field coach. At the University of Texas, Taylor earned a master's degree in psychology in 1914, and then a Ph.D. in sociology from the University of Missouri in 1918. In the interim, Taylor studied widely, taking summer courses in sociology at Columbia University and the University of Chicago.

== Academic career ==
After earning his doctorate, Taylor served as a faculty member in sociology at the University of Missouri from 1917 until 1920, where he conducted early research for the United States Department of Agriculture Division of Farm Population and Rural Life. In 1920, Taylor moved to the State College of Agriculture and Engineering of North Carolina where he accepted a professorship in agricultural economics and rural sociology.

== Federal government career ==
Following his dismissal from State College, Taylor was intermittently employed two years, during which time he sold insurance. The onset of the Great Depression made finding a new academic appointment difficult, as universities and colleges faced budget cuts. Yet, in 1933, Taylor found employment as one of the first rural sociologists hired to staff the incipient federal agencies created as part of Roosevelt Administration's the New Deal programs. Taylor began as a special advisor to a program director within the Department of the Interior in 1933, before taking a position as the Raleigh regional director of the Land Policy Section of the Agricultural Adjustment Administration the following year. After a brief term as director of the Administration's Rural Resettlement Division, Taylor was appointed as head of the Bureau of Agricultural Economics' Farm Population and Rural Life Division by then-Secretary of Agriculture Henry A. Wallace in 1938. Taylor would remain as division head until his retirement in 1952.

Under Taylor's leadership, the Division would implement policies to assist farmers, perform research on agricultural planning, study rural social life in the United States, and devise social programs to assist the economically disadvantaged in rural areas.

== Personal life ==
Prior to his career as a sociologist, Taylor initially pursued a life as a minister. Though he later abandoned the ministry, Taylor would preach for supplementary income while an undergraduate and graduate student.
