= Gene Fowler Jr. =

American film editor (1917–1998)

- Born: May 27, 1917; Denver, Colorado, U.S.
- Died: May 11, 1998 (aged 80); Woodland Hills, Los Angeles, California, U.S.
- Occupation: Film editor

Gene Fowler Jr. (May 27, 1917 – May 11, 1998), the eldest son of journalist and author Gene Fowler, was a prominent Hollywood film editor.

== Career ==
His work included films of Fritz Lang and Samuel Fuller and movies like Stanley Kramer's It's a Mad, Mad, Mad, Mad World (1963), John Cassavetes' A Child Is Waiting (1963) and Hang 'Em High (1968).

He was also the director of feature films as well as numerous television programs. While the majority of his directorial work is regarded as minor efforts (Leonard Maltin lists only three of his seven features in his compendium), two of his films, I Was a Teenage Werewolf (1957) and I Married a Monster from Outer Space (1958), have gained some critical attention in retrospect.

Gene Fowler Jr. was married to film editor Marjorie Fowler from 1944 until his death. On May 12, 1964, they were both the first man and woman to respectively get top honors at American Cinema Editors. Fowler became president while his wife became secretary. He died in the Hollywood Hills, California of natural causes.

His brother Will Fowler (1922–2004) was a Hollywood screenwriter.

== Selected filmography ==
Editor
Year	Film	Director	Notes	Other notes
1935	Thanks a Million	Roy Del Ruth		Uncredited
1941	Western Union	Fritz Lang	First collaboration with Fritz Lang	Uncredited
1941	Week-End in Havana	Walter Lang		Uncredited
1942	Tales of Manhattan	Julien Duvivier	Restored sequence	Uncredited
1943	Hangmen Also Die!	Fritz Lang	Second collaboration with Fritz Lang	
1944	The Woman in the Window	Fritz Lang	Third collaboration with Fritz Lang	Uncredited
1947	Philo Vance Returns	William Beaudine		
1953	Captain Scarface	Paul Guilfoyle		
1956	While the City Sleeps	Fritz Lang	Fourth collaboration with Fritz Lang	Uncredited
1956	The Naked Hills	Josef Shaftel		
1957	China Gate	Samuel Fuller	First collaboration with Samuel Fuller	
1957	Run of the Arrow	Samuel Fuller	Second collaboration with Samuel Fuller	
1957	Forty Guns	Samuel Fuller	Third collaboration with Samuel Fuller	
1963	A Child Is Waiting	John Cassavetes		
1963	It's a Mad, Mad, Mad, Mad World	Stanley Kramer		
1968	Hang 'Em High	Ted Post		
1970	A Man Called Horse	Elliot Silverstein		
1970	Monte Walsh	William A. Fraker		
1972	Molly and Lawless John	Gary Nelson		
1979	Skatetown, U.S.A.	William A. Levey		
1981	Caveman	Carl Gottlieb		
1983	Cracking Up	Jerry Lewis		

Editorial department
Year	Film	Director	Role	Notes
1953	Main Street to Broadway	Tay Garnett	Supervising editor	
1955	Paris Follies of 1956	Leslie Goodwins	Supervising editor	
1956	While the City Sleeps	Fritz Lang	Editorial supervisor	
1956	Beyond a Reasonable Doubt	Fritz Lang	Editorial supervisor	Fifth collaboration with Fritz Lang
1968	A Fine Pair	Francesco Maselli	Editorial supervisor	

Director
Year	Film	Notes
1957	I Was a Teenage Werewolf	
1958	Showdown at Boot Hill	
1958	Gang War	
1958	I Married a Monster from Outer Space	
1959	The Rebel Set	
1959	Here Come the Jets	
1959	The Oregon Trail	
1978	The Astral Factor	Uncredited

Producer
Year	Film	Director	Credit
1947	The Senator Was Indiscreet	George S. Kaufman	Associate producer
1948	Mr. Peabody and the Mermaid	Irving Pichel	Associate producer
1958	I Married a Monster from Outer Space	Himself	Producer

Sound department
Year	Film	Director	Role
1952	The Thief	Russell Rouse	Sound effects editor

Writer
Year	Film	Director
1951	My Outlaw Brother	Elliott Nugent
1959	The Oregon Trail	Himself

Documentaries

Editor
Year	Film	Director
1946	Let There Be Light	John Huston
1971	Walls of Fire	Herbert Kline; Edmund Penney

Short documentaries

Editor
Year	Film	Director
1943	The Autobiography of a 'Jeep'	Irving Lerner
1945	The Battle of San Pietro	John Huston
1946	Seeds of Destiny	David Miller

Shorts

Editor
Year	Film	Director
1942	Sex Hygiene	Otto Brower; John Ford
1964	Choice	—N/a

TV movies

Editor
Year	Film	Director
1956	The Magnetic Moon	Hollingsworth Morse
1971	Goodbye, Raggedy Ann	Fielder Cook
1971	A Death of Innocence	Paul Wendkos
1971	The Homecoming: A Christmas Story	Fielder Cook
1972	The Glass House	Tom Gries
1972	The Crooked Hearts	Jay Sandrich
1972	Pursuit	Michael Crichton
1973	The Girls of Huntington House	Alf Kjellin
1973	The Blue Knight	Robert Butler
1973	A Dream for Christmas	Ralph Senensky
1978	The New Adventures of Heidi	Ralph Senensky
1979	The House on Garibaldi Street	Peter Collinson
1985	Evergreen	Fielder Cook

Editorial department
Year	Film	Director	Role
1973	Dying Room Only	Philip Leacock	Editorial supervisor
1973	Don't Be Afraid of the Dark	John Newland	Editorial supervisor
1974	The Stranger Within	Lee Philips	Editorial supervision
1974	Bad Ronald	Buzz Kulik	Editorial supervisor
1975	The Runaways	Harry Harris	Editorial supervisor
1976	Helter Skelter	Tom Gries	Editorial supervisor
1977	The Prince of Central Park	Harvey Hart	Supervising editor
1977	Killer on Board	Philip Leacock	Supervising editor

Production manager
Year	Film	Director	Role
1975	Conspiracy of Terror	John Llewellyn Moxey	Post-production supervisor
1976	Sybil	Daniel Petrie	Post-production supervisor

Second unit or assistant director
Year	Film	Director	Role
1975	The Runaways	Harry Harris	Second unit director

TV pilots

Editor
Year	Film	Director
1973	Pomroy's People	Fielder Cook

Editorial department
Year	Film	Director	Role
1977	Bunco	Alexander Singer	Supervising editor

Production manager
Year	Film	Director	Role
1975	Conspiracy of Terror	John Llewellyn Moxey	Post-production supervisor

TV series

Editor
Year	Title	Notes
1952−53	The Abbott and Costello Show	22 episodes
1954	Rocky Jones, Space Ranger	39 episodes
1961	The Aquanauts	1 episode
1964−65	Rawhide	12 episodes
1966	Gilligan's Island	5 episodes
1966−67	The Wild Wild West	5 episodes
1967	Cimarron Strip	1 episode
1973−74	Doc Elliot	7 episodes
1974−75	Apple's Way	13 episodes
1972−75	The Waltons	73 episodes
1977	Hunter	4 episodes
1985	Evergreen	3 episodes

Editorial department
Year	Title	Role	Notes
1954	Duffy's Tavern	Supervising editor	1 episode
1956	Crossroads	Supervising editor; Supervising film editor	4 episodes
1976	The Blue Knight	Editorial supervisor	2 episodes
1976	Helter Skelter	Editorial supervisor	2 episodes
1977	Hunter	Editorial supervisor	3 episodes
1977	Eight Is Enough	Editorial supervisor	20 episodes
1975−77	The Waltons	Editorial supervisor	54 episodes

Additional crew
Year	Title	Role	Notes
1965−66	The Wild Wild West	Production associate	7 episodes

Director
Year	Title	Notes
1952	China Smith	26 episodes
1954	The New Adventures of China Smith	11 episodes
1958	Man Without a Gun	1 episode
1959	Man with a Camera	3 episodes
1960	Rawhide	2 episodes
1960	Tales of Wells Fargo	6 episodes
1961	Perry Mason	1 episode
1961	Gunsmoke	1 episode
1961	The Aquanauts	2 episodes
1960−61	Assignment: Underwater	8 episodes

Production manager
Year	Title	Role	Notes
1973	The Waltons	Post-production supervisor	4 episodes
1976	Sybil	Post-production supervisor	2 episodes
