= French Cancan =

1955 film by Jean Renoir

- Theatrical release poster
- Directed by: Jean Renoir
- Written by: Jean Renoir; André-Paul Antoine (idea)
- Produced by: Louis Wipf
- Starring: Jean Gabin; Françoise Arnoul; María Félix
- Cinematography: Michel Kelber
- Edited by: Borys Lewin
- Music by: Georges Van Parys
- Production companies: Franco London Film; Jolly Film
- Distributed by: Gaumont Distribution (France); Diana Cinematografica (Italy)
- Release dates: 9 April 1955 (West Germany); 3 May 1955 (France); 22 September 1955 (Italy)
- Running time: 104 minutes
- Countries: France; Italy
- Language: French
- Box office: 4,075,306 admissions (France)

French Cancan (also known as Only the French Can) is a 1955 musical comedy-drama film written and directed by Jean Renoir and starring Jean Gabin, Francoise Arnoul and María Félix. It marked Renoir's return to France and to French cinema after an exile that began in 1940.

Where Renoir's previous film, The Golden Coach (1952), had celebrated the 18th-century Italian commedia dell'arte, this work is a homage to the Parisian café-concert of the 19th century, with its popular singers and dancers. Visually, the film evokes the paintings of Edgar Degas and the Impressionists, including Renoir's own father, Pierre-Auguste Renoir.

== Plot ==
In Paris in the late 1880s, Henri Danglard owns a fashionable, but not very profitable, nightclub called Le Paravent Chinois, where the main attraction is a solo belly dance by his mistress Lola. One night, he accompanies a group of friends to La Reine Blanche, a simple dance hall in Montmartre, where he sees people doing the old-fashioned, but high-energy, cancan. Struck by the suppleness and charm of a young laundress named Nini, he persuades her to take dancing lessons for a new show he is planning. He sells Le Paravent Chinois and, with additional funds from Baron Walter, a banker who is infatuated with Lola, buys and tears down La Reine Blanche, intending to replace it with a new venue—the Moulin Rouge—at which a troupe of glamorous girls will perform the cancan.

Tryouts, rehearsals, and demolition progress fairly smoothly, until Danglard is injured at the construction site in a fight with Paulo, Nini's jealous boyfriend. Danglard falls behind on his payments while he recuperates, and Lola, who is jealous of Danglard's growing relationship with Nini, arranges to buy his property out from under him. She offers to give control back to him if he drops Nini and the cancan, but he refuses. Fortunately for Danglard, Alexandre, a timid, wealthy prince, falls in love with Nini and, although she barely knows him and does not reciprocate his feelings, buys the property from Lola and gives it back to Danglard.

Construction of the Moulin Rouge proceeds, and preparations get underway for opening night. Danglard begins to shift his focus from Nini to his newest discovery, Esther Georges, a maid whom he is turning into a singer. Lola tells Alexandre that Nini's relationship with Danglard is more than professional, and, when this is confirmed, the prince shoots himself. Lola feels terrible and apologises to everyone. Alexandre recovers, and Nini agrees to go out on the town with him for one night, after which he returns to his home country alone.

On opening night, the house is packed and the audience is rapturous. Seeing Danglard kiss Esther after her song and follow her into her dressing room, Nini declares that she will not perform in the climactic cancan unless she can have Danglard all to herself. He responds that she can have a fabulous life with Alexandre or a conventional one with Paulo, but she will not be happy with him because he does not care for anything except the shows and performers that he is creating, and those change all the time. Everyone rushes off, ready to try to perform with the unrehearsed Lola in Nini's place, but Nini decides to dance after all.

Danglard stays backstage alone and listens nervously to how his new cancan is received. Once he knows his new venture is a success, he joins the euphoric audience and hears a woman singing along behind him. He asks if she wants to go on the stage, and she says she does.

== Cast ==
- Jean Gabin as Henri "Zizi" Danglard
- Françoise Arnoul as Nini, a laundress-turned-dancer
- María Félix as Lola de Castro, a belly dancer with the stage name "La Belle Abbesse"
- Anna Amendola as Esther Georges, a maid-turned-singer
  - Cora Vaucaire provided Esther's singing voice
- Jean-Roger Caussimon as Baron Adrien Walter, a wealthy banker
- Dora Doll as La Génisse, a prostitute and pickpocket
- Giani Esposito as Prince Alexandre
- Gaston Gabaroche as Oscar, the pianist and conductor
- Jacques Jouanneau as Bidon, Savate's friend and accomplice
- Jean Parédès as Coudrier, a financier acquaintance of Baron Walter
- Franco Pastorino as Paulo, Nini's boyfriend, who is a baker
- Michèle Philippe as Eleonore, Barjolin's date at Le Paravent Chinois
- Michel Piccoli as Capitain Valorgueil
- Albert Rémy as Barjolin, a financier acquaintance of Baron Walter
- France Roche as Béatrix, Coudrier's date at Le Paravent Chinois
- Jean-Marc Tennberg as Savate, La Génisse's pimp and a petty criminal
- Valentine Tessier as Madame Olympe, Nini's mother
- Philippe Clay as Casimir "le Serpentin", a comic singer and dancer
- Édith Piaf as Eugénie Buffet, the singer at the Eldorado
- Patachou as Yvette Guilbert, the singer at the Alcazar d'Été
- André Claveau as Paul Delmet, the singer at the Cabaret du Chat Noir
- Mario Juillard as Bruno Balpe
- Jean Raymond as Paulus, the singer at the Petit Casino

=== Uncredited ===
- Pierre Olaf as Roberto, the whistling Pierrot
- Max Dalban as the owner of the Bal de la Reine Blanche
- Gaston Modot as Danglard's valet
- Pierre Moncorbier as the bailiff
- Hubert Deschamps as Amédé, the waiter at the café across from the Reine Blanche/Moulin Rouge
- Léo Campion as the Commandant, a regular at the café across from the Reine Blanche/Moulin Rouge
- Rosy Varte as a regular at the café across from the Reine Blanche/Moulin Rouge
- Annik Morice as Thérèse, Nini's friend at the laundry
- Lydia Johnson as Madame Guibolle, the dance teacher
- Michèle Nadal as Bigoudi, a dancer
- Sylvine Delannoy as Titine, a dancer
- Pâquerette as Prunelle, formerly the "Queen of the Cancan", now a beggar
- Laurence Bataille (Note: Daughter of Sylvia Bataille, the star of Renoir's earlier short film A Day in the Country.) as an aspiring dancer who ends up working behind the scenes at the Moulin Rouge

== Production ==
The film was shot at the Joinville Studios in Paris. The sets were designed by the art director Max Douy.

== Critical reception ==
In a review in Arts magazine in May 1955, François Truffaut called the film a milestone in the history of colour of cinema, saying: "Every scene is a cartoon in movement [...] Madame Guibole's dance class reminds us of a Degas sketch." While he did not consider it as important a film as Rules of the Game (1939) or The Golden Coach (1952), Truffaut nevertheless said it showed that Renoir was "as vigorous and youthful as ever." Writing in Positif, Bernard Chardère did not receive the film so positively, however, criticising the music, the sets, and even the final cancan scene. He wrote: "The phoniness of the Rue Lepic, with its vegetable carts and piles of artificial stones is painful to look at. The actors act. The audience gets bored. The dance rehearsals are Degas all right, but the kind that appears on Post Office calendars."

The film received the Grand Prix de l'Academie du Cinéma in 1956. Roger Ebert added French Cancan to his "Great Movies" list in 2012.
