= Arthur Mayer =

American film producer

Arthur L. Mayer
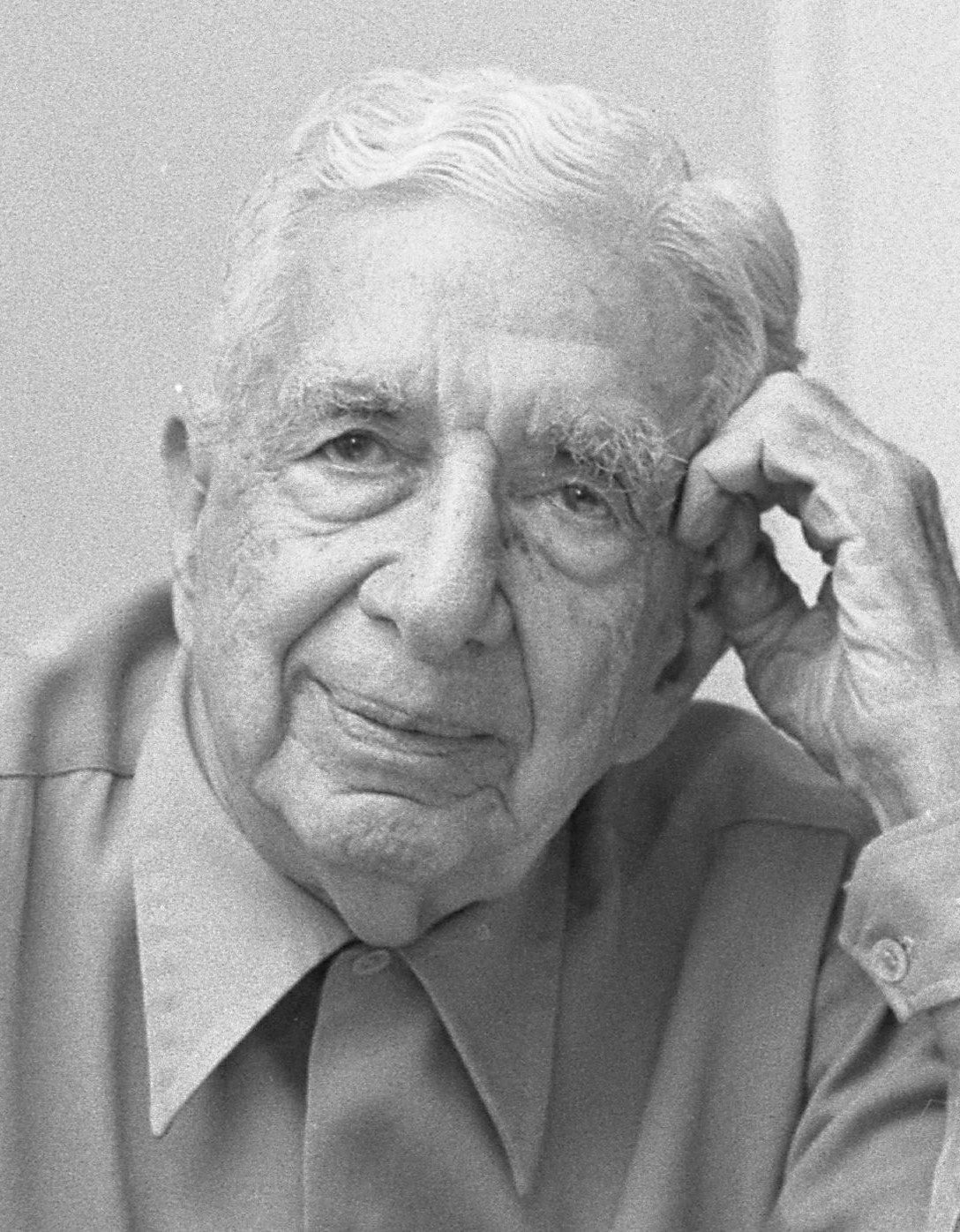
- Mayer in 1975
- Born: March 28, 1886; Demopolis, Alabama, U.S.
- Died: April 14, 1981 (aged 95); New York City, U.S.

Arthur L. Mayer (March 28, 1886 – April 14, 1981) was an American film producer and film distributor who worked with Joseph Burstyn in distributing films directed by Roberto Rossellini and other famous European film directors. Some films were distributed under the name Burstyn-Mayer Inc. Mayer was also interviewed by Warren Beatty for Beatty's film Reds (1981).

In 1949, Mayer went into business to distribute French films in the U.S. with Edward Kingsley, who later founded Kingsley-International Pictures.

Mayer was co-producer of the French documentary film La Vie Commence Demain (Life Begins Tomorrow, 1950), directed by Nicole Védrès and featuring Pablo Picasso and Jean-Paul Sartre, as well as the feature film High Hell (1958). He was married to Lillie Mayer (born July 29, 1889).

Mayer and his wife Lillie were featured in the film Arthur and Lillie which was nominated for an Academy Award for Best Documentary Short.

== List of films distributed by Mayer and Burstyn ==
- Bicycle Thieves (1948)
- The Quiet One (1948)
- Lo Tafhidenu/The Illegals (1948) documentary in Hebrew directed by Meyer Levin
- Paris 1900 (1947)
- Shakuntala (1947)
- Paisan (1946)
- The Battle of the Rails (1946)
- Rome, Open City (1945)
- Marie-Louise (1944)
- Portrait of a Woman (1944) English title of Une femme disparait directed by Jacques Feyder
- Hymn of the Nations (1944)
- The Forgotten Village (1941)
- Lights Out in Europe (1940)
- Louise (1939)
- Crisis (1939)
- Katia (1938)
- Ballerina (1937) English title of Le morte du cygne
- La guerre des gosses (1937) version of War of the Buttons directed by Jacques Daroy
- Pépé le Moko (1937)
- The Lower Depths (1936)
- Women's Club (1936)
- Die ewige Maske (1935)
- Whirlpool of Desire (1935), English title of French film Remous directed by Edmond T. Gréville (US release, November 1939)
- Song of the Streets (1933)
