= Otto Fried =

American artist (1922–2020)

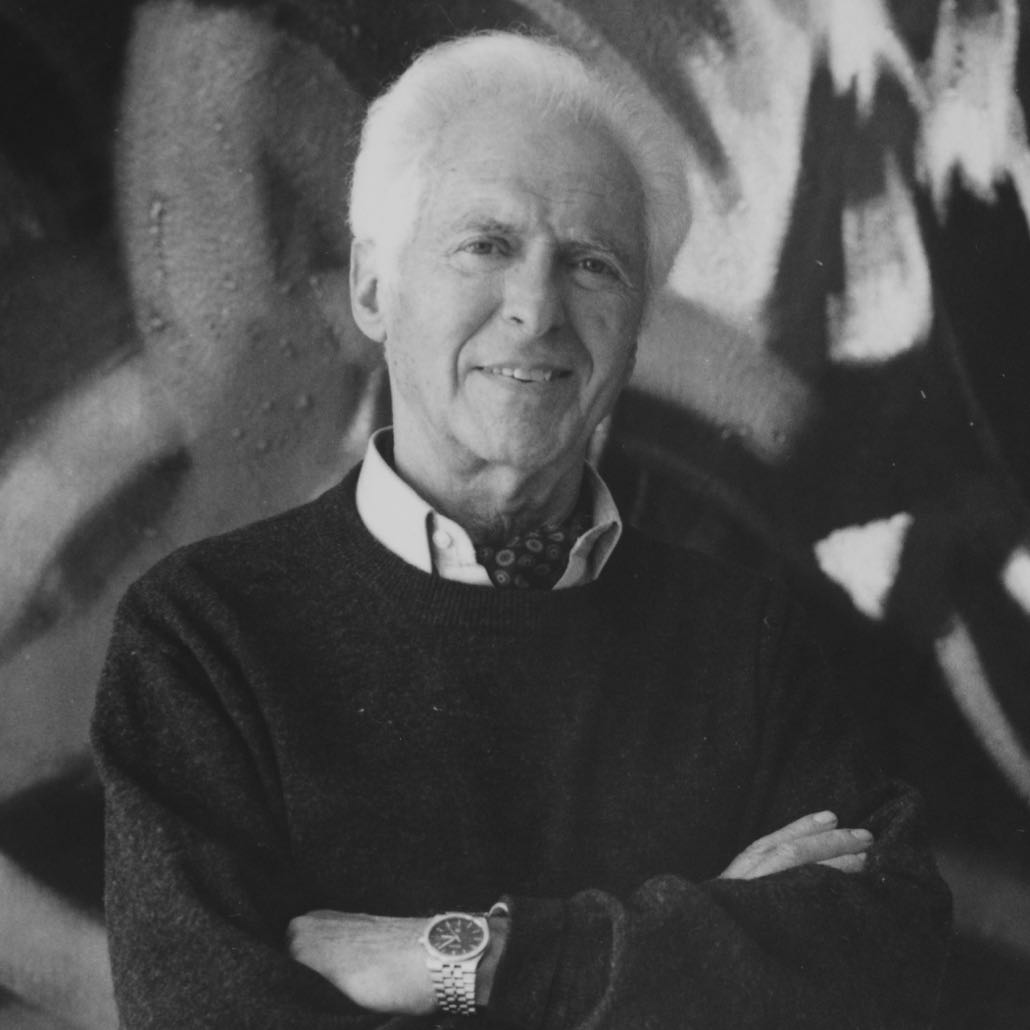
- Otto Fried in his studio in Paris 1998
- Born: Otto Siegmund Fried; December 13, 1922; Koblenz, Germany
- Died: December 31, 2020 (aged 98); Meudon, Hauts-de-Seine, France
- Education: Oregon State College, Corvallis, University of Oregon, Eugene, Studio of Fernand Léger, Académie de Montmartre Paris
- Known for: Paintings, drawings, sculptures, objects

Otto Fried was a German-born American artist who worked and lived in New York City and Paris.

Otto Fried saw himself primarily as a painter; however, his extensive oeuvre consists not only of paintings and drawings but also of sculptures and objects of everyday use. From his early landscape themes, still lifes, and portraits he developed an abstract formal and pictorial language in which circular movements and forms became dominant. Works by Otto Fried are to be found in numerous private and public collections, including the Musée nationale d'art moderne, Centre Georges-Pompidou in Paris, the Metropolitan Museum of Art, and the Museum of Modern Art in New York.

== Life ==
=== 1922–1946 ===
Otto Siegmund Fried was the younger of the two children of Robert Fried and Rebecca (Ricka) Fried, née Salomon. He grew up in Horchheim at the Rhine river, now a district of Koblenz, where his father ran a butchery. As life in Nazi-ruled Germany became increasingly ominous the parents located distant relatives in Portland, Oregon. In 1936 they sent 13-year-old Otto into their care. Before they could follow with Otto's older brother Ernst, his brother died as a result of anti-Semitic violence in 1937. In 1938 his father was interned in the Buchenwald concentration camp for several months. In 1939, finally, his parents managed to escape to the US, where Otto attended high school. In 1943 Otto Fried was drafted into military service and enlisted in the Air Corps USAAF. Having served in India, China, Burma and in the Caribbean, the GI Bill enabled him upon his return in 1946 to pursue a university education in the US and to study abroad.

=== 1946–1951 ===
In his first year at Oregon State College he took biology classes but – after a summer course in studio art – transferred to the Arts and Architecture Department at the University of Oregon in Eugene; he graduated in 1949. After an exhibition of art from the American Northwest that allowed him to show his work alongside works by Mark Tobey, Louis Bunce, Morris Graves, Kenneth Callahan and Carl Morris, Otto Fried travelled to Paris. There he worked in Fernand Léger's studio at the Académie de Montmartre, which Lager ran together with André Lhote. His painting professor at the University of Oregon, the "legendary teacher" Jack Wilkinson, who had been in touch with Fernand Léger may have pointed him into this direction. During the two and a half years spent in France, Fried took part in the Salon d'Automne, the Salon de l'Armée and the Salon de Mai at the Musée d'Art Moderne de la Ville de Paris as well as in the Grand Cycle de Peinture in Deauville and in an exhibition of Léger's class at the Galérie Jeanne Bucher, a gallery representing Georges Braque, Nicola de Staël, Wassily Kandinsky, Otto Freundlich, and Paul Klee. Otto Fried was granted his first solo exhibition at the Parisian American Library. He collaborated with his friend, poet and philosopher Larry Margolis, on a small volume, entitled WE3, consisting of texts by Margolis and paintings by Fried, published in 1950 by Somogy in Paris.

=== 1952–1961 ===
Returning to the United States, Otto Fried decided against a university position in Oregon and in favor of a life as an independent artist in New York. There he met the painters associated with Abstract expressionism without joining the movement. He made friends with filmmakers and musicians such as Chou Wen-chung, John Lowenthal, Gene Forrell, and Mildred Forrell, and he entered into a first marriage that did not last. Through sculptor Kenneth Snelson, his student friend, who had moved to Manhattan, too, Fried met R. Buckminster Fuller, who would encourage him. Fried made the acquaintance of the art collector and posterior museum founder Warren M. Robbins, who served as cultural attaché for the State Department at the United States Embassy in Bonn. Warren helped him to his first solo exhibitions in Germany, supported by the United States Information Service. After these shows in Koblenz, Darmstadt and Tübingen, works by Fried also went to a gallery in Salzburg, Austria. Museum purchases followed soon: In 1960 and 1961 the Metropolitan Museum of Art acquired some of his monotypes. In the United States, Fried had initially become known for his works in this particular technique that generates unique prints.

=== 1962–2020 ===
After his marriage to Micheline Haardt, a French fashion journalist, who would later take on leading positions in the European fashion industry, Otto Fried relocated to Paris in 1962. Until 2010 he kept an additional apartment and studio in New York, where he used to work for a couple of months of every year. In the USA, his new works were repeatedly exhibited at the Irving Gallery in Milwaukee, Wisconsin, at the Coe Kerr Gallery and at Achim Moeller Fine Art in New York City as well as at the Fountain Gallery and the Laura Russo Gallery in Oregon. The Paris galleries Gianna Sistu, Hector Brame, and subsequently Brame & Lorenceau showed his works created in France. Major solo exhibitions took place at the Mittelrhein Museum in Koblenz in the 1970s, at the Fuji TV Gallery in Tokyo in the 1980s, and at the Portland Art Museum in the 1990s.

In addition to the Metropolitan Museum of Art, the MoMA, and the Centre Pompidou, the Rose Art Museum, the SUArt Galleries in Syracuse, the Indianapolis Museum of Art, the Portland Art Museum, the Jordan Schnitzer Museum in Eugene, and the Mittelrhein Museum acquired works by Otto Fried as well as private collectors, public art collections of leading banks and other large corporations in New York, Atlanta, Dallas, Seattle, San Francisco, Geneva and Tokyo. In December 2020, the Friends of the Koblenz Art Museums purchased one of Fried's largest paintings for the Ludwig Museum's collection in the Deutschherrenhaus. This work, Untitled (1998), was already on view in the Ludwig Museum's Otto Fried exhibition that summer, the title of which echoes that of one of Otto Fried's metal reliefs: Otto Fried. Heaven Can Wait – Heaven Can't Wait. This purchase and his exhibition were Otto Fried's last during his lifetime. Three and a half years after the death of his wife Micheline Fried, Otto Fried died on December 31, 2020. He is buried in the Père Lachaise Cemetery in Paris.

== Work ==
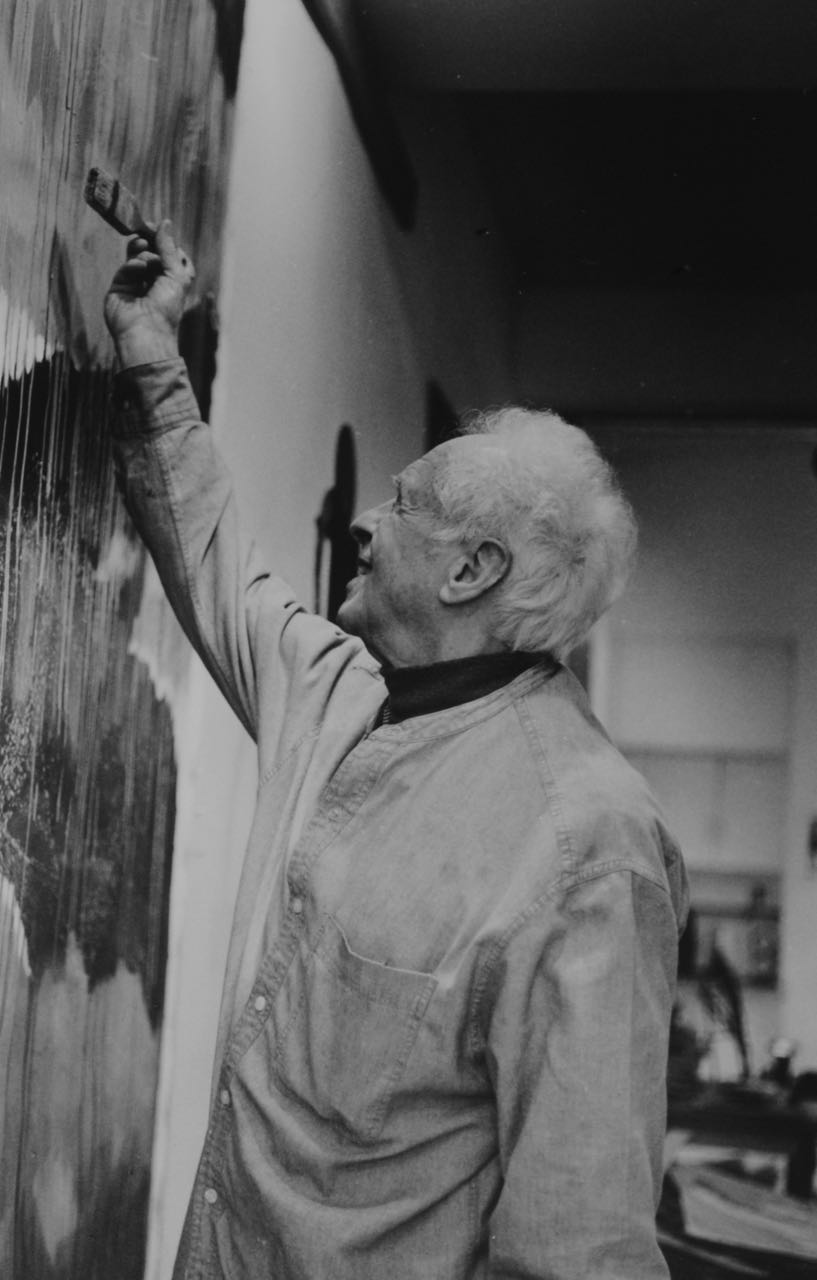
Otto Fried in his studio in Paris 2004

Fried's fascination for fauna and flora, for land and water and for the earth and the universe determined his work until his later years: His drawings and paintings combine figurative and landscape elements with abstract forms. According to Swiss art historian and art critic Pierre Courthion "in Fried's work lyricism animates geometry". Art collector Paul Haim draws attention to the lines of Oregonean coastal formations and wooded mountains running – more or less obviously – through many of Fried's pictures. As art historian and gallerist Sylvie Brame puts it, Otto Fried was in a "permanent dialogue with nature".

Applying the technique of the monotype Fried had an element of chance play a role in the creation of his still pictures and used it as a means of abstraction. In the early 1970s Fried experimented with cut-outs of monotypes, using them as source material for collages, which featured the circle as the actual subject of these works. Circles had, in retrospect, already appeared in his painted beach and cityscapes of the 1950s. In his blue and white seascapes of the 1970s, the boats and sails on Fried's canvas turned into circles and triangles. Fried's circles became more and more independent and moved into the center of his play with colors and forms. In the 1980s, his painting grew to be more sculptural: His circles converted into spheres; they moved in front of each other like celestial bodies or opened up to provide a view of their core. When Fried turned to mixed media in the 1990s and worked with metal foils and acid, the resulting reliefs, vice versa, adopt peculiarities of paintings. At the end of the 1990s, working with a broad brush on large canvases, he dissolved the hammered-looking circular forms of the 1970s and the densely spotted planets of the 1980s in large, powerful circular sweeps. In the first decade of the 21st century mountains and coasts return to his canvases. Building on the contrast of flatly applied and dripping oil paint, Fried re-invited randomness and allowed the paint to become active; he let his commemorative paintings shed "tears", as Lisa Forrell understands his late landscapes of the mind.

Especially in the 1980s and 1990s, he designed functional objects such as plates made of Limoges porcelain, drinking glasses made of Murano glass and rugs, commissioned and produced by the Cogolin manufactory. Together with blacksmith Jean Prévost he worked on numerous small and large sculptures and pieces of furniture as well as on further objects made of metal – from andirons, bookends, and doorknobs to furniture to Esprit de la Forêt (1994), a three-meter high iron fountain, which is located in a sculpture park La petite escalère in the south of France.

At times Otto Fried worked as a sculptor and designer, he drew extensively – often in large formats – and he painted at all times. Beyond these artistic disciplines he used to "play", as he would call it, with whatever material at hand – with shells and stones, with branches and wire. The most telling one of the photos of what has perhaps been the first full-page newspaper article about Otto Fried shows him with a small, partly flexible sculpture that allows him, in his words "to investigate types of rhythms on a single threat of metal".

== Reception ==
As a painter Otto Fried was placed in succession of William Turner. His paintings have been related to works by Alexander Rodchenko, Robert Delaunay and Yves Klein. Fried's series of paintings on paper mounted on canvas, shown in Paris at the Galerie Gianna Sistu in 1990, in particular, has been compared to Jim Dine's Color Chart Paintings, Gerhard Richter's Color Panels, the Abstract Painting by Ad Reinhardt and to Jasper Johns' Alphabet paintings.

While most exhibitions in galleries and museums – such as the shows in Koblenz (1978) and in Tokyo (1985) – concentrated on Fried's paintings and drawings, some exhibitions were devoted to his three-dimensional works: In 1991 Achim Moeller exclusively introduced to Fried's metal reliefs and in 1999 the Denis Cadé Gallery exhibited his earlier paper reliefs. In 1997 Brame & Lorenceau showed sculptures together with drawings by Fried and three years later a selection of Fried's functional objects.

In Otto Fried. Meubles et Objets Yvonne Brunhammer, director of the Musée des Arts décoratifs, describes Otto Fried's use of glass, porcelain, wood and metal and she provides a comprehensive catalogue of Fried's work in the field of design. In addition to this publication, the monograph Otto Fried with an essay by Thomas West, the former chief editor of Art International, and Otto Fried. Heaven Can Wait – Heaven Can't Wait, the catalogue and anthology edited by the curator and director of the Ludwig Museum Koblenz, Beate Reifenscheid, offer an introduction to the different facets of Otto Fried's oeuvre.

Texts on Fried's works and exhibitions appeared furthermore in various magazines and journals such as Revue Moderne, August 1951; Arts Magazine, March 1956, April 1963; Pictures on Exhibition, (G.B.), May 1963 (Charles Z. Offin), October 1975; Art News, May 1963, March 1966; Arts, Paris (Pierre Cabanne), May 1964, (Raymond Charmet), December 1966; La pensée française (Jean Bouret), December 1966; Les Arts (Christine Gleiny), February 1977; Encore Magazine (Tim Hinshaw), January 1979; Antiques & Art Weekly, April 1987, June 1987; Beaux Arts (Luc Vezin), June 1987; L'Oeil (Solange Thierry), June 1987, June 1990; Arts & Antiques, May 1988; Cimaise (Claude Bouyeure), June–July–August 1990. Reviews of Otto Fried's exhibitions have also appeared in local or regional newspapers as well as in newspapers with a national readership such as International Herald Tribune, The New York Times, The Boston Globe, Le Monde, Le Figaro, The Japan Times, and Jüdische Allgemeine.

== Solo exhibitions (selection) ==
- American Library, Paris, 1951
- Reed College Gallery, Portland, Oregon, 1952
- University of Oregon, Eugene, Oregon, 1953
- The Oregon Journal Lobby, Portland, Oregon, 1952
- Wellons Gallery, New York, 1956
- U.S.I.S. Deutsches Herrenhaus Koblenz, 1958
- U.S.I.S. Kunstgewerbeschule Tübingen, 1959
- U.S.I.S. German American Cultural Institute Darmstadt 1960
- Welser Galerie, Salzburg 1960
- Leger Gallery, White Plains, New York, 1961
- Arlan Gallery, Pittsburgh, Pennsylvania, 1961
- Oshkosh Museum, Wisconsin, 1961
- Revel Gallery, New York, 1963
- Galerie Vendome, Pittsburgh, Pennsylvania, 1964
- Galerie Hector Brame, Paris, 1964, 1968, 1969
- Byron Gallery, New York, 1966
- The Fountain Gallery, Portland, Oregon, 1968, 1973, 1979, 1982, 1986
- Museum of Art, University of Oregon, Eugene (today: Jordan Schnitzer Museum), 1968
- Irving Gallery, Milwaukee, Wisconsin, 1969
- Coe Kerr Gallery, New York, 1973, 1975
- Galerie des Grands Augustins, Paris, 1977
- Mittelrhein Museum, Koblenz, 1978
- Fuji TV Gallery, Tokio, 1979, 1985
- Galerie Valmy, Paris, 1980
- The Washington Design Center, Washington D.C., 1983
- Galerie Gianna Sistu, Paris, 1987, 1990
- Foster/White Gallery Seattle, 1989
- Achim Moeller Fine Art, New York, 1991, 1995
- Laura Russo Gallery, Portland, Oregon, 1993, 1999
- Galerie Brame & Lorenceau, Paris, 1997, 2002, 2006
- Portland Museum of Art, Portland, Oregon, 1999
- Denise Café Gallery, New York 1999
- Ludwig Museum, Koblenz, 2020

== Collections (selection) ==
Museums

- Musée national d’art moderne, Centre Georges Pompidou, Paris.
- Museum of Modern Art, New York.
- Metropolitan Museum of Art, New York.
- Rose Art Museum, Brandeis University, Waltham, Massachusetts.
- Portland Art Museum, Portland, Oregon.
- SUArt Galleries, Syracruse, New York.
- Jordan Schnitzer Museum of Art, University of Oregon, Eugene, Oregon.
- Indianapolis Museum of Art, IMA Galleries, Newfields, Indianapolis, Indiana.
- Mittelrhein-Museum, Koblenz.
- Ludwig Museum, Koblenz.

Further public collections

- Continental Grain Corporation, (today: ContiGroup Companies), New York City.
- Goldman Sachs & Co, New York City.
- Rainier Corporation (heute: Rainier Industries), Seattle, Washington
- Seattle Telephone Co., Seattle, Washington.
- N.E.C., (later: NEC Corporation of America), San Francisco, California.
- Georgia Pacific Corporation (later: Georgia Pacific), Atlanta, Georgia.
- Merrill Lynch, Portland, Oregon.
- Bank of California, Portland, Oregon.
- Far West Federal Bank, Portland, Oregon.
- Haseltine Collection, Portland, Oregon.
- United States National Bank of Oregon, Portland, Oregon.
- Willamette Industries, Portland, Oregon.
- Hoffman Construction Co., Portland, Oregon.
- First National Bank of Oregon (later: First Interstate Bank of Oregon), Portland, Oregon.
- Pacific Power and Light, San Francisco, California (heute: Portland, Oregon).
- Fuji Mic Computer, Inc., (later: Fujitsu Ltd.), Tokio.
- Nippon Broadcasting System, Inc., Tokio.
- Frana, Co. Geneva (later: Socotab Frana SA), Genf.
- Coopers & Lybrand, San Francisco (later: Pricewaterhouse Coopers International, London).
- Hans & Elsbeth Juda Collection, London.
- Collection of Terry and Jean de Gunzburg, Paris und London.
- Guerlain Collection, (later: Fondation d'art contemporain Daniel et Florence Guerlain), Paris.
- Collection of Paul and Jeannette Haim, Paris (later directed by Dominique Haim, Straßburg).

Further public and corporate collections with works by Otto Fried have been dissolved or have been taken over by other persons, corporations or institutions.

== Bibliography ==
- Hommage à Otto Fried. Brame & Lorenceau. Paris 2024.
- Beate Reifenscheid (Hrsg.): Otto Fried. Heaven Can Wait – Heaven Can’t Wait. Silvana Editoriale, Mailand 2020. (Catalogue and reader with contributions by Lisa Forrell, Beate Reifenscheid, Larissa Wesp, and Barbara Wolbert), ISBN 978-88-366-4647-0.
- Sylvie Brame: Otto Fried. Sélection des dessins et d'oevres sur papier. Paris 2009.
- Yvonne Brunhammer: Otto Fried. Meubles et Objets. Edizioni d’Arte Fratelli Pozzo, Turino 2001, ISBN 978-88-86789-30-1.
- Otto Fried. Recent Work. Portland Art Museum, Portland 1999. (With contributions by John E. Buchanan, Jr., and Kathryn Kanjo), ISBN 1-883124-09-3.
- Otto Fried. Sculptures et Dessins. Brame & Lorenceau, Paris 1997. (With a contribution by Philippe Brame).
- Otto Fried. Essay by Thomas West. Foundation Fine Art of the Century, Geneva 1995, ISBN 978-0-9646052-0-6.
- Otto Fried. Metal Relief Structures. Achim Moeller Fine Arts, New York 1991. (With an interview of Otto Fried by Kenneth Snelson).
- Claude Bouyeure: Otto Fried. Les Iliades du cercle. The Iliads of the Circle. Galerie Gianna Sista Paris. Cimaise 206. June–July–August 1990, Ivry sur Seine 1990.
- Otto Fried. Fuji Television Gallery, Tokyo 1985. (With contributions by Yusuke Nakahara and Paul Haim).
- Otto Fried. Fuji Television Gallery, Tokyo 1979.
- Otto Fried. Ströme, Mittelrhein Museum, Koblenz 1978. (With contributions by Kurt Eitelbach, Pierre Courthion, Donald Karshan, und R. Buckminster Fuller).
- Otto Fried. Le monde des sphères. Galerie des Grands Augustins. Paris 1977. (With a contribution by Pierre Courthion).
- Otto Fried. Irving Galleries, Milwaukee, Wisconsin, November 1961.
- Otto Fried. Recent Paintings, Oil Sketches, Monotypes. Milwaukee, Wisconsin, 1960. (With a contribution by Alfred Werner).
- Otto Frieds Technik der Monotypie. Stadt Koblenz und das Amerika Haus, Koblenz 1958.
- Otto Fried (Paintings) and Larry Margolis (Text): WE 3. Somogy, Paris 1950.
