= Gene Forrell =

American composer and conductor

- Born: 1915
- Died: 2005 (aged 89–90)
- Genre: soundtracks
- Occupations: composer and conductor
- Works: N.Y., N.Y. — A Day in New York

Gene Forrell (1915–2005) was an American composer and conductor.

Forrell was born Eugene Finkelhor in Pittsburgh, Pennsylvania, United States, where he attended Allderdice High School and Duquesne University. He left Duquesne for New York City on a scholarship from the Dalcroze School.

As a composer and orchestral conductor he worked in theater, dance, and television. He wrote the soundtrack to N.Y., N.Y. — A Day in New York, 1957, filmed by Francis Thompson. His other soundtrack credits include To Be Alive, a 1964 Academy Award-winning documentary. He served as a musical director in Europe and America. In England, he conducted the Alexandra Choral Society, the Enfield Grand Opera, the English Sinfonia, and the English National Orchestra. He also wrote commercial jingles. For several years, he conducted and recorded the popular Firestone Christmas albums. Forrell was also a longtime board member of the Musicians Foundation. Forrell did the musical score to the original version of The Private Life of a Cat ©1946 Alexander Hammid with "words" by Maya Deren.

Forrell died on September 21, 2005, at his home in New York.
