= Vincent Sheean =

American journalist and novelist (1899–1975)

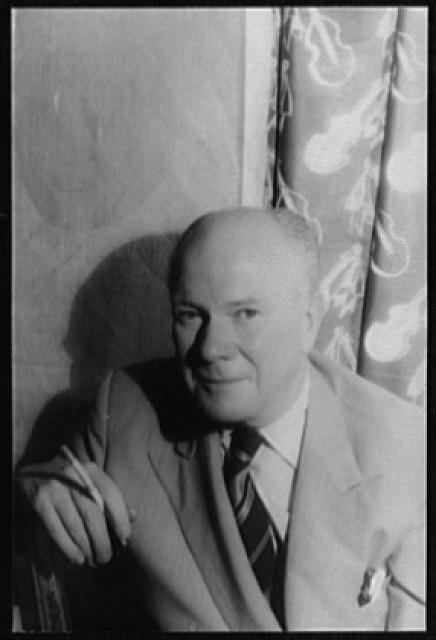
Vincent Sheean in 1958

James Vincent Sheean (December 5, 1899, Pana, Illinois – March 16, 1975, Arolo, Frz. of Leggiuno, Italy) was an American journalist and novelist.

== Career ==
Sheean's most famous work was Personal History (New York: Doubleday, 1935). It won one of the inaugural National Book Awards: the Most Distinguished Biography of 1935. (Note: Biography was separately recognized in 1935 and 1936, then subsumed in general Nonfiction.) Film producer Walter Wanger acquired the political memoir and made it the basis for his 1940 film production Foreign Correspondent, directed by Alfred Hitchcock.

Sheean served as a reporter for the New York Herald Tribune during the Spanish Civil War.

Sheean wrote the narration for the feature-length documentary Crisis (1939) directed by Alexander Hammid and Herbert Kline. He translated Ève Curie's biography of her mother, Madame Curie (1939), into English. Sheean wrote Oscar Hammerstein I: Life and Exploits of an Impresario (1955) as well as a controversial biography of Dorothy Thompson and Sinclair Lewis, Dorothy and Red (1963).

He studied at the University of Chicago, becoming part of a literary circle which included Glenway Wescott, Yvor Winters, Elizabeth Madox Roberts and Janet Lewis while he was there.

Vincent and Diana Forbes-Robertson Sheean were friends of Edna St. Vincent Millay and her husband, Eugen; they spent time together on Ragged Island off the coast of Maine during the summer of 1945.

== Books ==
Partial list, including both fiction and otherwise:

- American Among the Riffi (1926)
- New Persia (1927) - Iran
- Anatomy of Virtue - (1927) - Psychological romance novel of an American girl who marries an English nobleman.
- Gog and Magog
- The Tide (1933) - "If a Messiah Came to Your Town Today, What Would You Think? What Would You Do?".
- Personal History: Youth and Revolution: the Story of One Person's Relationship to Living History (1935)
- Sanfelice (1936) - Historical novel set in Naples
- The Pieces of a Fan (1937)
- A Day of Battle (1938) - Historical novel based on the French victory at Fontenoy in Flanders on May 11, 1745
- Not Peace but a Sword (1939) - Europe. Personal account of events in Prague, Madrid, London, Paris and Berlin during the 12 fateful months between March 1938 and March 1939.
- Lead, Kindly Light: Gandhi & the Way to Peace, Random House (1949). Can Gandhi's non-violent approach lead the world away from violence as the way to settle disputes?
- Between the Thunder and the Sun (1943) Account of being in England during the Battle of Britain.
