= L'amore (film) =

1948 film by Roberto Rossellini

- Film poster
- Directed by: Roberto Rossellini
- Written by: Roberto Rossellini; Tullio Pinelli; Federico Fellini; (script episode two)
- Based on: The Human Voice; by Jean Cocteau; Flor de santidad; by Ramón del Valle-Inclán
- Produced by: Roberto Rossellini
- Starring: Anna Magnani; Federico Fellini
- Cinematography: Robert Juillard; Aldo Tonti
- Edited by: Eraldo Da Roma
- Music by: Renzo Rossellini
- Production company: Tevere Film
- Distributed by: CEIAD (Italy); Joseph Burstyn (US)
- Release dates: 21 August 1948 (Venice); 2 November 1948 (Italy)
- Running time: 80 minutes (Note: Length taken from the British Film Institute's Blu-ray release. The 80-minute running time includes a 40-second sequence about the film's restoration.)

L'amore (Love) is a 1948 Italian drama anthology film directed by Roberto Rossellini, starring Anna Magnani and Federico Fellini. It consists of two parts, The Human Voice (Una voce umana), based on Jean Cocteau's 1929 play of the same title, and The Miracle (Il miracolo), based on Ramón del Valle-Inclán's 1904 novel Flor de santidad.

The film had its world premiere in the International Competition of the 9th Venice International Film Festival, on 21 August 1948, and was released in Italian cinemas on 2 November 1948.

The second part was initially banned in the United States until it was cleared in 1952 by the Supreme Court's decision upholding the right to freedom of speech. It was also banned in the United Kingdom until 1951.

== Plot ==
=== Episode one: The Human Voice ===
An unnamed woman, desperate and alone in her apartment, is having one last conversation with her former lover over the telephone. He asks her to return their letters to him. During their conversation, which is repeatedly interrupted, it is revealed that the man left her for another woman, and that she has just attempted suicide out of grief. As a last favour, she begs him not to take her successor to the same hotel in Marseille where she and he had once stayed.

=== Episode two: The Miracle ===
Nannina, a simple-minded and obsessively religious woman, tends goats at the Amalfi coast. When a handsome bearded wanderer passes, she takes him to be Saint Joseph. Offering his flask of wine, he gets her drunk and she falls asleep. When she awakens, he is gone and she is convinced that his appearance was a miracle. A few months later, when she faints in an orchard, the women who help her discover that she is pregnant. Nannina believes this is another miracle, but to the townspeople she becomes a figure of ridicule, so she flees into the mountains. A single goat leads her to an empty church, where she gives birth to her child.

== Cast ==
- Anna Magnani – The woman/Nannina
- Federico Fellini – The wanderer

== Production ==
While Rossellini was preparing his next film, Germany, Year Zero, Anna Magnani suggested to the director to adapt Cocteau's play The Human Voice which she had already performed on stage in 1942. Rossellini agreed and, because he and Magnani were staying in Paris at the time, filmed the first episode in a studio in Paris with a French crew.

In order to enable the short film a regular release, Rossellini had Federico Fellini script a second piece for Magnani, based on Valle-Inclán's novel Flor de santidad, which Rossellini turned into a screenplay with Tullio Pinelli.

== Release ==
L'amore premiered in the International Competition of the 9th Venice International Film Festival on 21 August 1948. It was released in Italian cinemas, in Rome, on 2 November the same year.

Reactions to the film were mostly negative; even French critic André Bazin, usually supportive of Rossellini's work, accused the first episode of "cinematic laziness".

=== U.S. censorship lawsuit ===
For the 1950 New York premiere, The Miracle was removed from L'amore and placed in a three-part anthology film titled The Ways of Love with two other short films, Jean Renoir's A Day in the Country (1936) and Marcel Pagnol's Jofroi (1933). While Rossellini's film had passed Italian censors without complaints, its New York screening was condemned by the National Legion of Decency and Catholic authorities for blasphemy. As a result, the city authorities revoked the license for the film's screening. Distributor Joseph Burstyn appealed the revocation to the New York Supreme Court, which ruled in favor of the state in October 1951. Burstyn then appealed to the Supreme Court of the United States. In its May 1952 decision in the case of Joseph Burstyn, Inc. v. Wilson, the Supreme Court upheld Burstyn's appeal, declaring that the film was a form of artistic expression protected by the guarantee to freedom of speech in the First Amendment to the United States Constitution.

== Awards ==
- 1949: Nastro d'Argento (Silver Ribbon) for Best Actress Anna Magnani by the Italian National Syndicate of Film Journalists
- 1950: New York Film Critics Circle Award for Best Foreign Language Film
