= Inno delle nazioni =

1862 cantata by Giuseppe Verdi

- Cantata by Giuseppe Verdi
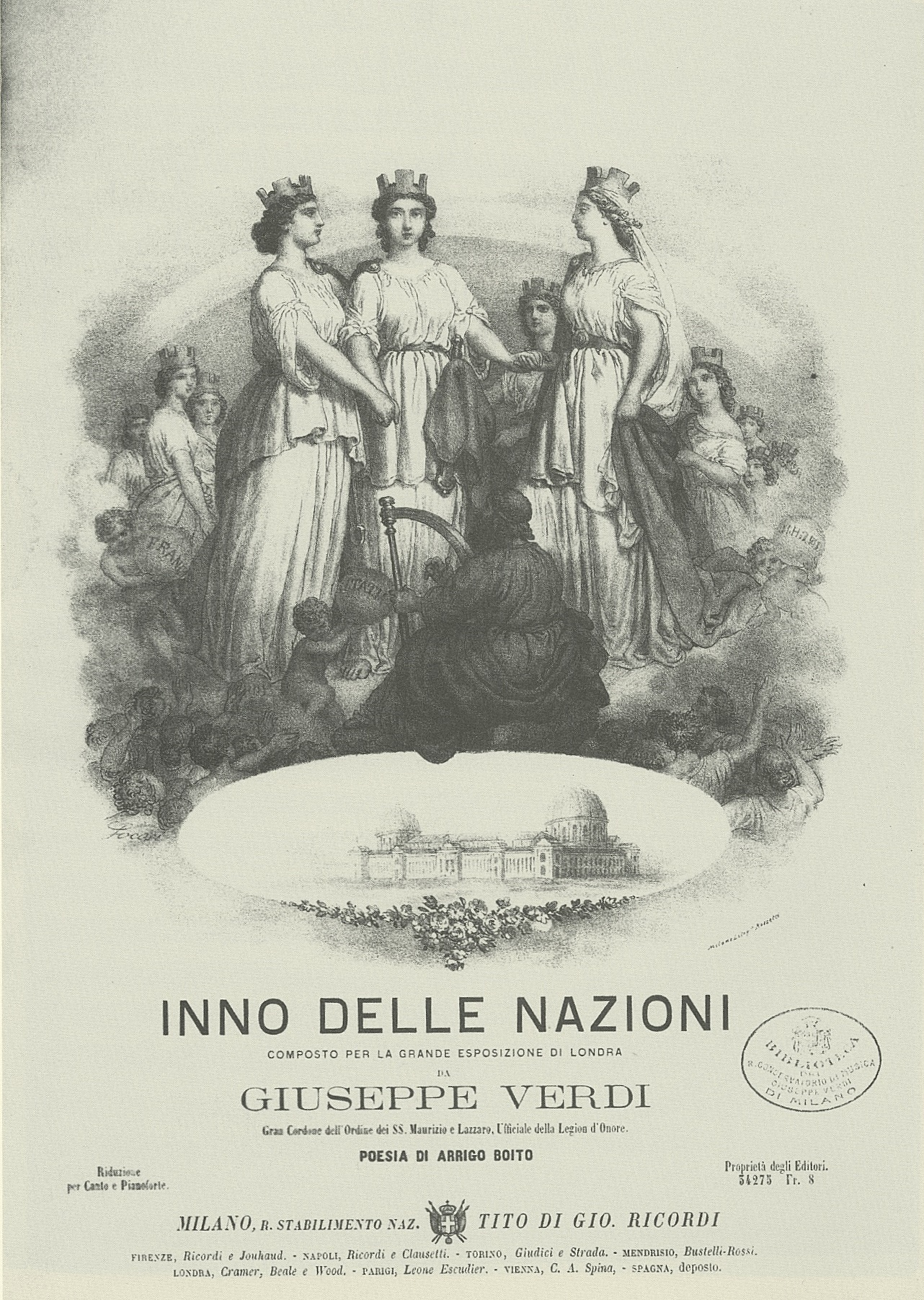
- Cover of first edition of the vocal score of the hymn (design by Alessandro or Robert Focosi)
- Occasion: 1862 International Exhibition
- Text: by Arrigo Boito
- Language: Italian, with portions in English and French
- Composed: 1862
- Performed: 24 May 1862: Her Majesty's Theatre, London
- Scoring: solo tenor, chorus and orchestra

Inno delle nazioni (Hymn of the nations), a cantata in a single movement, is one of only two secular choral works composed by Giuseppe Verdi. This Hymn incorporates "God Save the King", "La Marseillaise", and "Il Canto degli Italiani". It was the first collaboration between the composer and Arrigo Boito, who, much later, would revise the libretto of Simon Boccanegra and write the original libretti of Otello and Falstaff.

Although written for the 1862 International Exhibition in London, it premiered at Her Majesty's Theatre on 24 May 1862. It became the centerpiece of a 1944 propaganda film, Hymn of the Nations, where it was performed by the NBC Symphony Orchestra conducted by Arturo Toscanini with the Westminster Choir and Jan Peerce as tenor soloist.

== Background ==
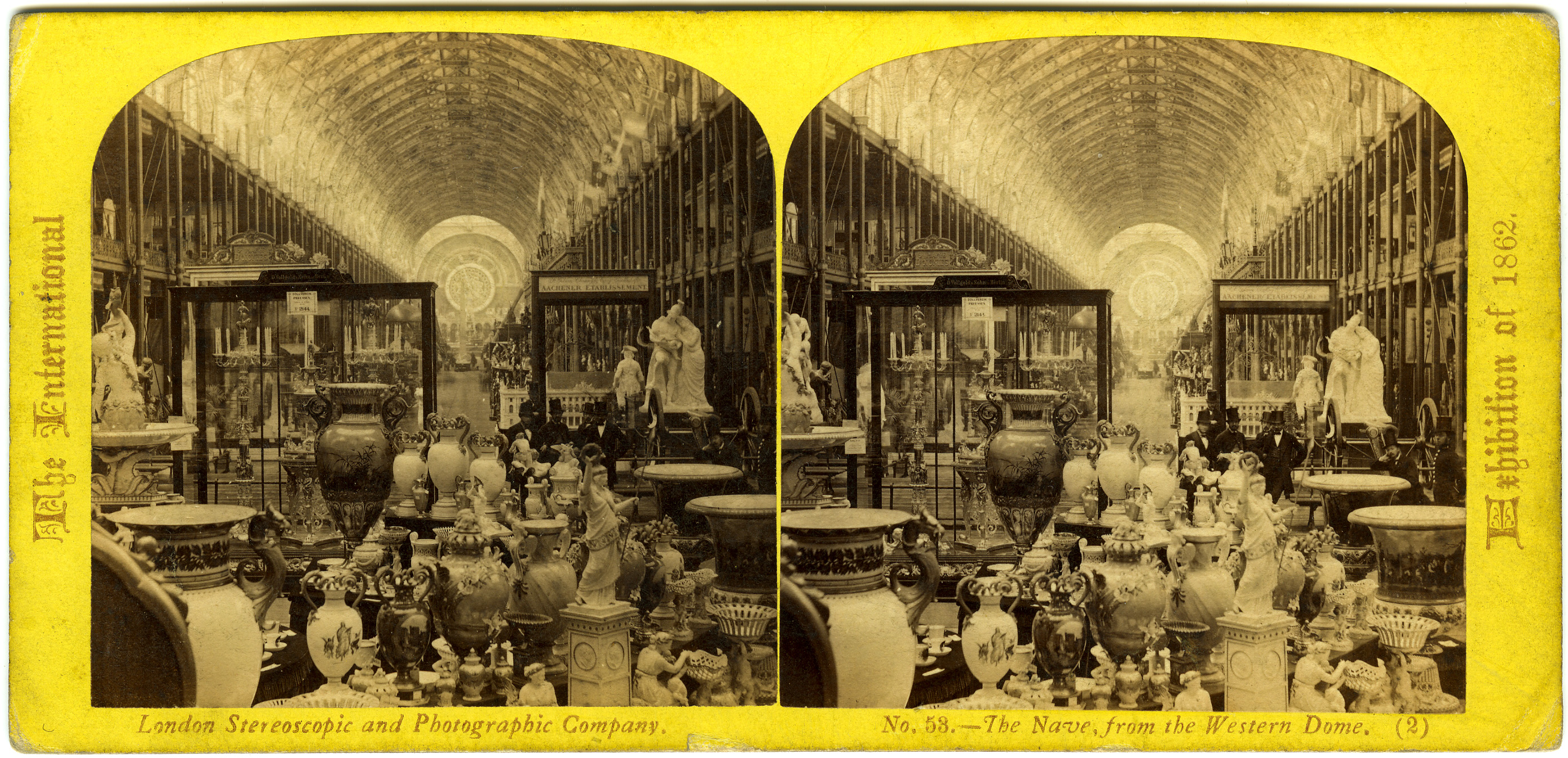
The nave from the Western Dome. A stereoscopic view of the 1862 International Exhibition published by the London Stereoscopic Company

In December 1858, the Society of Arts in London announced their intention to hold what was to be called the 1862 International Exhibition, seen as a successor to The Great Exhibition of 1851. Wanting to include musical performances (which were excluded from the 1851 exhibition), at the suggestion of the leading music critic Henry Chorley, they solicited new works from Daniel Auber (representing France), William Sterndale Bennett (England), Giacomo Meyerbeer (Germany) and Gioachino Rossini (Italy). Rossini declined the invitation.

Roberta Montemorra Marvin (who edited Inno delle nazioni for The Complete Works of Giuseppe Verdi series) considers that the committee did not initially ask Verdi to compose a piece because of Chorley's antipathy toward the composer's works. Nevertheless, after Rossini's refusal, in 1861 the committee invited Verdi, offering four suggestions as to form: anthem, chorale, triumphal march (for full orchestra), or march (for wind instruments). While honored by the request, Verdi tentatively declined, despite the intervention of fellow Italian and conductor Michael Costa, claiming his duties in preparing La forza del destino left no time available. He promised to consider the question in February 1862, once the preparation of the opera was out of the way.

Although Verdi detested writing occasional works, Marvin surmises that since Verdi was informed of the acceptance of the commission by Auber and Meyerbeer, personal pride and the chance at representing Italy at an international exhibition were the key reasons he took up the commission.

== Composition history ==
When illness of the soprano forced a postponement of La forza del destino, Verdi departed St. Petersburg and arrived in Paris on 24 February 1862. Two encounters influenced his decision to commence work on a composition for the exhibition. The first was with the composer Daniel Auber who apparently conveyed to Verdi that he was composing a march for the occasion. In correspondence recalling this meeting, Verdi indicated that he was also composing a march. But in a subsequent letter to Costa he indicated he was writing an overture. Costa relayed this information to the commissioners who agreed with the form of composition.

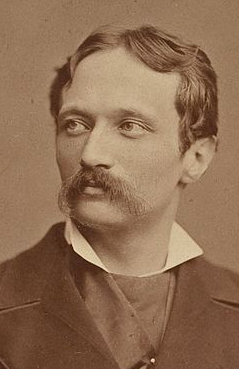
A young Boito

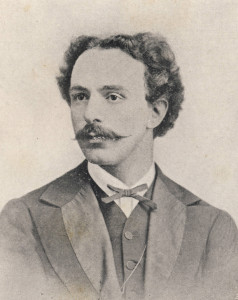
Franco Faccio around 1865

Secondly, two up-and-coming Italian writers, Arrigo Boito and Franco Faccio, met with Verdi at the end of February 1862, bearing a letter of introduction from Countess Clara Maffei. Marvin suggests the purpose of the meeting might have been to indirectly prompt Verdi to work on the commission. As a result of this meeting, Boito was charged with writing the text of the proposed work.

On 19 March the commissioners received a letter from the composer "in which he expressed his wish to substitute for the overture a cantata with Italian words, the solo part of which would be executed by Signor Tamberlik." Though the commissioners rejected Verdi's proposal (believing the work would be too large for the exhibition space), Verdi refused their rejection and continued working on the cantata (he called the work Cantica), completing it towards the end of March.

He gave the completed manuscript to his wife Giuseppina, who traveled to London to deliver it in early April. Steadfast in their refusal to accept the work, they would not meet with Giuseppina and wrote to Verdi that they could not accept performance of the cantata, since the necessary preparations would be too large an undertaking. Verdi arrived in London on 20 April, expecting that his work would be performed. Through much wrangling the commissioners remained firm in their refusal, Costa declaring that because it was scored for voices, not just for orchestra, it was against the rules of the Commission, that it had not arrived in time, and that there would not be enough time to rehearse. Verdi wrote to the publisher Léon Escudier on 22 April telling him that his cantata would not be performed.

The press received word of the refusal and wrote that the problem was Verdi's inability to meet a deadline. In response, Verdi wrote to The Times, published on 24 April, denying the claim: "[The commissioners] let it be known that twenty-five days (enough to learn a new opera) were not enough to learn this short cantata; and they refused it." He continued by stating that he wanted to "correct the error – that I did not send my composition".

Critical opinion sided with Verdi, and the blame fell on the commissioners. The incident proved embarrassing for them and for music director Costa. According to the Musical World, "The whole feeling of the country in this instance is with the Italian Maestro, and against the Commissioners. The cry has gone forth from one end of the kingdom to the other that a grievous wrong has been done, and that restitution is imperatively demanded."

== First performance and reception ==
Verdi was in the audience for the inaugural concert of the International Exhibition on 1 May 1862. The concert received only a lukewarm reception, making Verdi happy that his Cantica had not been programmed. The first performance of the cantata took place at Her Majesty's Theatre (at the time under the leadership of James Henry Mapleson) on 24 May 1862, after a performance of The Barber of Seville. "Every member" of Mapleson's company participated in the performance supplemented by 200 choristers of Jules Benedict's Vocal Association – the entire ensemble conducted by Luigi Arditi. Verdi wrote to his publisher Giovanni Ricordi "The effect seemed good, and it was encored ... Performance good on the whole, very good on the part of the orchestra. Arditi is a good conductor." Franco Faccio (who had been with Boito at their first meeting with Verdi) wrote to Boito: "The effect of the piece is irresistible."

Marvin feels that the controversy surrounding the genesis of the work makes it difficult to gauge contemporaneous reception. A review in the Revue et gazette musicale (1 June 1862) underscores the difficulty: "[The] unprecedented, incomprehensible conduct [the commissioners showed] to a man of such celebrity as Verdi, refusing a composition which he took the pains to bring himself, excited such astonishment and so turned all sympathies to his side, that his composition became famous even before anyone had heard it."

Most reviews tended to be overly sympathetic to the composer. The report in The Daily Telegraph provides an example of the exaggerated reaction:

At the conclusion of the Cantata Signor Verdi was loudly called for, and, after some delay, was led on by the energetic and enthusiastic Mdlle. Tietjiens, not once nor twice only, but several times, to receive the heartiest tribute of approbation which an appreciative and sympathetic English audience could bestow. Not that the manifestations of good feelings were confined to applause alone, for bouquets and wreaths were showered on the favourite maestro, and favourite vocalists were even roused from their ordinary listlessness to do demonstrative honour to their illustrious countryman. The applause still continuing, the whole Cantata was then repeated. At the conclusion of the second performance Signor Verdi was then led forward by Signor Giuglini, and even after the curtain fell, he was compelled again to bow his acknowledgments.

Chorley's review continued his antagonism toward Verdi: "we must state frankly that the Cantata appears to be no favourable specimen of Signore Verdi's peculiar manner, and beside being of a form entirely different from that in which he was invited to compose, is, in every point of taste and of art, unsuited to the occasion for which it was designed."

== Political implications ==
Reviewers questioned Verdi's decision to include songs representing the United Kingdom("God Save the Queen"), France ("La Marseillaise") and Italy ("Il Canto degli Italiani", also known as "Inno di Mameli"). At the time, neither "La Marseillaise" nor "Il Canto degli Italiani" were their respective country's national anthem. Some critics, such as the unnamed one writing in the Musical World, incorrectly thought the inclusion of such nationalistic songs or the potential political embarrassment from their inclusion was the reason for the cantata's rejection from the inaugural concert.

Chorley and other critics charged Boito with presenting a biased view of European harmony, one dominated by Italy. Marvin observes the cover art also shows Italy on a par with England and France and she hypothesizes that it was not financial gain that led Verdi to accept the commission but rather a desire to affirm Italy's musical, particularly its operatic, supremacy. This feeling is illustrated in the long letter which Verdi wrote to Arrivabene: Marvin considers that Verdi, well aware of his own importance in the musical world, saw this as a chance to serve as a voice supportive of Italian music in an international context, although the composer expressed to both his publisher and to his friend Count Arrivabene his lack of interest in writing pieces for a given occasion.

== Subsequent performances ==
After the world premiere, Inno delle nazioni was presented six more times in London in 1862; the final occasion was on 16 June, along with all the music written for the 1862 International Exposition. The Paris premiere took place on 2 May 1863 at the Théatre Italien at a benefit concert for the composer Charles Billema. The solo was performed by a soprano, Rosina Penco.

The first Italian performance took place on 24 June 1864 at the Teatro alla Scala, although, in giving permission, Verdi was skeptical that it would be a success: "It will be a fiasco, as all my works are, when they are first performed in Milan". The first American performance took place on 28 April 1874 at the Academy of Music in New York, conducted by Emanuele Muzio (a long-time assistant of Verdi's), with Christina Nilsson as the soloist.

Some of the 20th-century performances of Inno delle nazioni were for propaganda purposes. Arturo Toscanini conducted it on 25 July 1915 in an outdoor arena in Milan, shortly after Italy entered World War I. During World War II Toscanini performed it on 31 January 1943 with the NBC Symphony Orchestra, Jan Peerce as soloist, and choristers from Westminster Choir College in a highly touted broadcast and the work was also the centerpiece of a 31-minute film for the United States Office of War Information called Hymn of the Nations, directed by Alexander Hammid. It was filmed at the NBC Studios and consists of Toscanini conducting the NBC Symphony in a performance of Verdi's Overture to La forza del destino and Inno delle nazioni, which contains the national anthems of the United Kingdom, France, and Italy (the World War I allied nations), to which Toscanini added the Soviet "Internationale" and "The Star-Spangled Banner". The film, which featured a performance by Toscanini and the same forces as the 1943 broadcast, was narrated by Burgess Meredith.

Another rendition was commissioned for the ending of the documentary 16 Days of Glory about the 1984 Summer Olympics in Los Angeles. With Plácido Domingo as tenor soloist, the new orchestration incorporated the national anthems of Finland, the Netherlands, Italy, United Kingdom, France, Australia, Canada, Mexico, Japan, Germany, and the United States.

== Music ==
The cantata is scored for piccolo, 2 flutes, 2 oboes, 2 clarinets, 2 bassoons, 4 horns, 2 trumpets, 3 trombones, cimbasso, timpani, bass drum, cymbals, percussion, 2 harps, and strings.

The "characters" in the critical edition are designated as the "Coro di Popolo" (Chorus of People of all nations) and the tenor soloist is "Un Bardo" (a poet) ("A Voice Among Them").

== Critical reaction ==
In modern times, Julian Budden has noted that "Verdi's own experiment in combining national anthems [..] sounds contrived because there has to be a certain amount of harmonic manipulation to make it possible" but he does regard "the bold, not to say reckless, combination of different melodies" as pointing the way forward and actually being accomplished "with greater skill in Aida".
