= Don Oreck =

American actor

- Born: Donald Allen Oreck; August 31, 1930; Los Angeles, California, US
- Died: March 5, 2006 (aged 75); Los Angeles, California, US
- Occupations: Film, television actor
- Spouses: Joanna Moore (m. 1956; div. 1957) Mary Ann Powell (m. 1958; div. 1971)
- Children: 2

Donald Allen Oreck (August 31, 1930 – March 5, 2006) was an American actor who, between 1955 and 1961, played supporting roles in numerous television series and made uncredited appearances in a few feature films.

A native of Los Angeles, California, Oreck became a member of the Los Angeles Police Department following a stint in the United States Army. While continuing his service with law enforcement, he began taking small acting assignments, which gradually increased in importance until, in the late 1950s, he could be spotted in various installments of television programs.

In 1959, Oreck and his wife invested in the film You Hurt, I Cry. He also acted in the film, and she was the producing coordinator. Also in 1959, Oreck portrayed the lead in the episode "Gringo Pete" of Rex Allen's syndicated western series Frontier Doctor.

== Personal life ==
Oreck had two children, Kevin and Elizabeth. He died on March 5, 2006, after having had a degenerative brain disease.

== Selected filmography ==
- 1951 short film Santa and the Fairy Snow Queen
- 1955 film Target Zero
- 1956 episode of Studio 57
- 1956 episode of The West Point Story
- 1958 episode of State Trooper
- 1959 episode of M Squad
- 1958 episode of Sea Hunt
- 1959 episode of Men into Space
- 1960 episode of Checkmate
- 1961 episode of Bonanza
