= Jofroi =

1934 film

- Directed by: Marcel Pagnol
- Written by: Marcel Pagnol
- Based on: Jofroi by Jean Giono
- Produced by: René Pagnol
- Starring: Vincent Scotto; Henri Poupon; Charles Blavette
- Cinematography: Willy Faktorovitch
- Edited by: Suzanne de Troeye; André Robert
- Music by: Vincent Scotto
- Production company: Les Auteurs Associés
- Distributed by: Les Films Marcel Pagnol
- Release date: 16 February 1934
- Running time: 52 minutes
- Country: France
- Language: French

Jofroi is a 1934 French drama film directed by Marcel Pagnol and starring Vincent Scotto. It tells the story of a man who has sold his orchard. When the new owner wants to cut the trees down, the former owner threatens with suicide. The film is based on the short story "Jofroi de la Maussan" by Jean Giono, which appears in the collection of his short stories The Solitude of Compassion.

== Cast ==
- Vincent Scotto as Jofroi
- Henri Poupon as Fonse
- Charles Blavette as Antonin
- Odette Roger as Marie
- Annie Toinon as Barbe
- Henri Darbrey as Le notaire
- André Robert as L' instituteur
- José Tyrand as Le curé

== Release ==
Joseph Burstyn released the film in the U.S. in 1950 as part of the anthology The Ways of Love.

== Bibliography ==
- Betz, Mark. Beyond the Subtitle: Remapping European Art Cinema. University of Minnesota Press, 2009.
