= Hymn of the Nations =

1944 short film directed by Alexandr Hackenschmied

- Hymn of the Nations
- Directed by: Alexander Hammid
- Written by: May Sarton
- Produced by: Irving Lerner
- Starring: Arturo Toscanini; Jan Peerce
- Narrated by: Knox Manning (original narration); Burgess Meredith (alternative narration)
- Cinematography: Boris Kaufman
- Music by: Giuseppe Verdi
- Distributed by: US Office of War Information; Arthur Mayer & Joseph Burstyn (1946 theatrical release)
- Release date: February 1944
- Running time: 31 minutes
- Country: United States
- Languages: English; Italian

Hymn of the Nations, originally titled Arturo Toscanini: Hymn of the Nations, is a 1944 film directed by Alexander Hammid, which features the Inno delle nazioni, a patriotic work for tenor soloist, chorus, and orchestra, composed by Italian opera composer Giuseppe Verdi in the early-1860s. For this musical work, Verdi utilized the national anthems of several European nations.

== Production ==
In December 1943, Arturo Toscanini filmed a performance of this music for inclusion in an Office of War Information documentary about the role of Italian-Americans in aiding the Allies during World War II. Toscanini changed the lyrics of the Italian national anthem from "Italia, patria mia" — Italy, my fatherland — to "mi patria tradita" — my betrayed fatherland. He also added a bridge passage to include arrangements of "The Star-Spangled Banner" for the United States and "The Internationale" for the Soviet Union and the Italian partisans. Joining Toscanini in the filmed performance in NBC Studio 8-H, were tenor Jan Peerce, the Westminster Choir, and the NBC Symphony Orchestra.

The film also included the overture to Verdi's opera La Forza del Destino. The narration was written by May Sarton, film editing by Boris Kaufman, and narration read by actor Burgess Meredith. The original version was released on VHS by Blackhawk Films, which retitled it Arturo Toscanini Conducts Giuseppe Verdi. A newly restored version by the Library of Congress, with the Meredith narration, has been issued on DVD.

== Reception ==
The film was nominated for an Academy Award for Best Documentary Short. The Academy Film Archive preserved Hymn of the Nations in 2010. The film is part of the Academy War Film Collection, one of the largest collections of World War II era short films held outside government archives.

== The Internationale ==
The version of the film with the Internationale removed

The change of the Soviet Union's national anthem from "The Internationale" to the "State Anthem of the USSR" was a factor in the production of the 1944 movie Hymn of the Nations, which made use of an orchestration of "The Internationale" that Arturo Toscanini had already done the year before for a 1943 NBC radio broadcast commemorating the twenty-sixth anniversary of the October Revolution.

It was incorporated into Verdi's Inno delle nazioni alongside the national anthems of the United Kingdom (already in the original) and the United States (incorporated by Toscanini for a prior radio broadcast of the Inno in January of that year) to signify the side of the Allies during World War Two.

Toscanini's son Walter remarked that an Italian audience for the movie would see the significance of Arturo being willing to play these anthems and unwilling to play Giovinezza and the Marcia Reale because of his anti-Fascist political views. Alexandr Hackenschmied, the film's director, expressed his view that the song was "ormai archeologico" (nearly archaeological), but this was a countered in a letter by Walter Toscanini to Giuseppe Antonio Borgese, rejecting the objections of Borgese, Hackenschmied, and indeed the Office of War Information.

At the time, Walter stated that he believed that "The Internationale" had widespread relevance across Europe, and in 1966 he recounted in correspondence that the OWI had "panicked" when it had learned of the Soviet Union's plans, but Arturo had issued an ultimatum that if "The Internationale", "l'inno di tutte le glebe ed i lavoratori di tutto il mondo" (the anthem of the working classes of the whole world) was not included, that if the already done orchestration and performance were not used as-is, then they should forget about distributing the film entirely.

The inclusion of "The Internationale" in the Toscaninis' minds was not simply for the sake of a Soviet Union audience, but because of its relevance to all countries of the world. Although Walter did not consider "The Internationale" to be "good music", he considered it to be (as he stated to the OWI) "more than the hymn of a nation or a party" and "an idea of brotherhood".

It would have been expensive to re-record a new performance of the Inno without "The Internationale", and thus it remained in the movie as originally released. Some time during the McCarthy Era, however, it was edited out of re-released copies, and remained so until a 1988 Library of Congress release on video, which restored "The Internationale" to the movie.

== Bibliography ==
- Marvin, Roberta Montemorra (2017). The Politics of Verdi's Cantica. Routledge. ISBN 9781351541459.
- Horowitz, Joseph (1994). Understanding Toscanini: A Social History of American Concert Life. University of California Press. ISBN 9780520085428.
