= Arthur and Lillie =

1975 film

- Directed by: Jon H. Else
- Produced by: Jon H. Else; Steven Kovacs; Kristine Samuelson
- Starring: Arthur Mayer
- Production company: Stanford University
- Distributed by: Pyramid Films
- Release date: 1975
- Running time: 29 minutes
- Country: United States
- Language: English

Arthur and Lillie is a 1975 American short documentary film directed by Jon H. Else. It was nominated for an Academy Award for Best Documentary Short.

== Synopsis ==
The film is a biographical documentary about Arthur and Lillie Mayer - their own lives and their adventures in the formation of "Hollywood" from its earliest days.
