= Brame & Lorenceau Gallery =

The logo

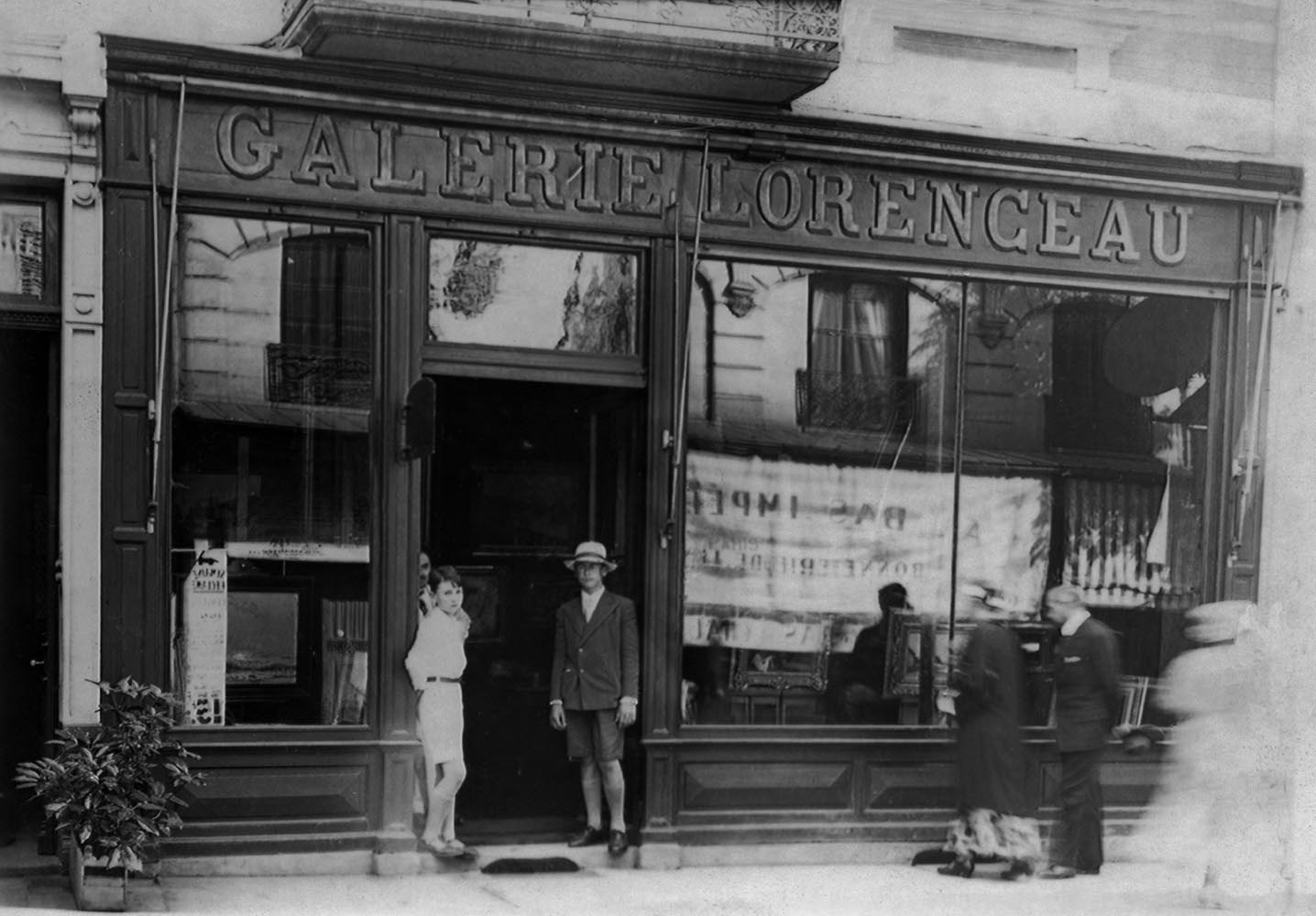
Galerie Lorenceau in Vichy (c. 1931–32)

Brame & Lorenceau Gallery (Galerie Brame & Lorenceau) is an art gallery in Paris, created by the merger of the galleries of Hector Brame and Jean Lorenceau, both of which opened in 1864. It is an art dealer, broker, appraiser, and consultant.

Hector-Henri-Clement Brame (1831–1899) was an actor in Paris when he began dealing art with Paul Durand-Ruel. His list of clients at the time included Francois Bonvin, Narcisse Virgilio Díaz, Eugene Fromentin, and Camille Corot.

The gallery is known for its expertise in Degas, evaluating or appraising dozens of purported Degas works each year.

Hector Brame's sister, Felicité, married Gustave Tempelaere, the patriarch of the Tempelaere art dealing dynasty.
