= Santa and the Fairy Snow Queen =

- Directed by: Sid Davis
- Written by: Robert Niel Porter
- Produced by: Sid Davis
- Starring: Rochelle Stanton; Edmund Penney; Margot von Leu
- Cinematography: Leonard Clairmont; Homer O'Donnell
- Edited by: Thor Brooks
- Production company: Sidney Davis Productions
- Release date: 1951
- Running time: 26 minutes
- Country: United States
- Language: English

Santa and the Fairy Snow Queen is a 1951 short fantasy film directed by Sid Davis.

== Plot ==
Snoopy, (Rochelle Stanton) one of Santa Claus' (Edmund Penney) brownies, introduces herself to the audience, and explains that it is her job to watch little boys and girls, to see if they are behaving well. She also ensures that all the toys Santa gives to children on Christmas are being cared for. If she finds them broken or forgotten, she hauls them off to the Land of Lost and Forgotten Toys. Snoopy then says, Santa asked her to tell all the children the story of how the Fairy Snow Queen gave life to toys, so that they might be more respectful of their gifts.

Snoopy then begins the story: one Christmas Eve, long ago, after Santa and the brownies had finished making the toys, Santa asked the Fairy Snow Queen to visit for a sugar cookie. The Fairy Snow Queen had discovered Santa deeply asleep in his chair, exhausted from his hard work. At his feet, the queen found several of the toys that he was about to deliver: a rag doll, (Jenny Neal) a musical doll, (Lee Porter) a jack-in-the-box, (Don Oreck) a toy soldier, (Bob Porter) a baby doll, (Audrey Washburn) a doll dressed as a peasant, (Joanna Lamond) and a candy lion (Patrick Clement).

Feeling overlooked, the Fairy Snow Queen decided to play a trick on Santa, and brought the toys to life. As the toys took their first steps, the queen danced with the rag doll, and Santa woke up. The toys showed that they could sing, and while Santa enjoyed their music, he asked the Fairy Snow Queen to revert them to their inanimate state. The queen protested, saying it's all good fun. The toy soldier and baby doll then show everyone a marching routine, after which the mischievous Jack jumps out of his box and frightens the other toys, until he is coaxed back into his dwelling by the toy soldier. The Fairy Snow queen used her magic to calm everyone down, and Santa asked her once again to put the toys back to normal, before the toys fall in love with each other, or break themselves.

The queen then revealed that her magic had been taken away because she'd been irresponsible. She told Santa she could only change the toys back if they wish to return to their normal states, and they had no such desire. After this, Santa told the toys that if they don't change back, he won't have any gifts to give to the children. The Fairy Snow Queen then offered a compromise: the toys will come to life for one hour, at midnight, each night. The toys agreed to this, and Santa appointed Snoopy the caretaker of all the toys. Before she changed them back, the musical doll and the toy soldier reveal they have fallen in love with each other. In remembrance of her, the soldier gave the doll his golden medal, and Santa decreed all musical dolls will wear golden medals to commemorate their love. The queen returned the toys back to normal, leaving Santa and Snoopy to load the toys onto his sleigh.

== Music ==
Some of the music used in the short film was from The Nutcracker Suite and The Sleeping Beauty by Pyotr Ilyich Tchaikovsky.

== Production ==
Originally a one act play written by Porter in 1949, the film wasn't copyrighted until two years later. It was distributed by Encyclopædia Britannica Films for televised broadcasts across the US.

== Cast ==
- Rochelle Stanton as Snoopy
- Edmund Penney as Santa
- Margot von Lou as the Fairy Snow Queen
- Jenny Neal as Rag Doll
- Lee Porter as Musical Doll
- Don Oreck as Jack-in-the-Box
- Bob Porter as Toy Soldier
- Audrey Washburn as Baby Doll
- Joanna Lamond as Peasant Doll
- Patrick Clement as Candy Lion

== Legacy ==
It was spoofed by RiffTrax three times, the first being as the accompanying short prior to the live riffed version of the 1964 cult classic Santa Claus Conquers the Martians, a film that was previously parodied on Mystery Science Theater 3000.
