= Crisis (1939 film) =

- Screenshot of title card
- Directed by: Herbert Kline; Hans Burger (co-director); Alexander Hammid (co-director)
- Written by: Vincent Sheean
- Screenplay by: Hans Burger; Alexander Hammid
- Produced by: Herbert Kline
- Starring: Eduard Benes; Leif Erickson; Konrad Henlein
- Narrated by: Leif Erickson
- Cinematography: Alexander Hammid
- Edited by: Alexander Hammid
- Music by: H. W. Susskind; Jaroslav Harvan
- Distributed by: Arthur Mayer & Joseph Burstyn
- Release date: March 13, 1939 (USA)
- Running time: 95 minutes
- Country: United States
- Language: English

Crisis (1939) is a feature-length documentary about the 1938 Sudeten Crisis. It was released briefly before the Nazi occupation of Czechoslovakia on March 15, 1939. The film was directed by Herbert Kline, Hans Burger, and Alexander Hammid, with narration written by Vincent Sheean and read by Leif Erickson. The National Board of Review named Crisis one of the ten best films of 1939.

== Plot ==
The film opens with the title page of Mein Kampf, which is then replaced by a map of Central Europe as Germany annexes Austria. Germany is then transformed into a wolf with its jaws surrounding Czechoslovakia. Despite assurances from Hitler and Goring that Czechoslovakia will not be threatened, the people of Czechoslovakia know that Hitler mentioned taking over their country in Mein Kampf.

The film emphases the democratic and multi-cultural nature of Czechoslovakia, taking great pains to show that not all Germans in the Czechoslovak Republic are pro-Nazi, and that there were many anti-Nazi Germans who were refugees from the Third Reich. However, the Sudeten German Party, under Konrad Henlein becomes powerful with propaganda assistance from Berlin, building up a paramilitary group and implementing an uprising. Despite successfully fending off invasion in May 1938, the Czechs are sold out and have their country partition at the Munich conference, at which they are not even present.
