= The Kid from Cleveland =

1949 film by Herbert Kline

- Directed by: Herbert Kline
- Screenplay by: John Bright
- Story by: Herbert Kline; John Bright
- Produced by: Walter Colmes
- Starring: George Brent; Lynn Bari; Russ Tamblyn; Tommy Cook; Ann Doran; Louis Jean Heydt; K. Elmo Lowe; John Beradino
- Cinematography: Jack Marta
- Edited by: Jason H. Bernie
- Music by: Nathan Scott
- Production company: Herbert Kline Productions
- Distributed by: Republic Pictures
- Release dates: September 2, 1949 (Cleveland); September 5, 1949 (U.S.)
- Running time: 89 minutes
- Country: United States
- Language: English

The Kid from Cleveland is a 1949 sports drama film starring George Brent, Lynn Bari and Russ Tamblyn, directed by Herbert Kline, and released by Republic Pictures.

The real-life Indians had just won the 1948 World Series, and many of the team's players made appearances in the film, as well as owner Bill Veeck, co-owner and former Major League Baseball star Hank Greenberg, and then current coach and Baseball Hall-of-Famer Tris Speaker. Also featured were the team's then current and former ballparks, Cleveland Municipal Stadium and League Park. Several Cleveland Indians and Boston Braves players also appear in the film in archive baseball footage segments from the 1948 World Series. Footage of football of the Cleveland Browns and hockey of the Cleveland Barons is also featured.

== Plot ==
A troubled teenaged fan is helped by his favorite baseball team, the Cleveland Indians. The kid attracts the attention of sportscaster Mike Jackson alongside Bill Veeck and Hank Greenberg, who spot him on the field imitating a baseball game after he sneaks into Cleveland Stadium on the eve of Game 5 of the World Series. A curious case of truths and lies follow after the sportscaster takes the kid to his home after he told him that he was an orphan, with the first being that he actually has a stepfather in Carl Novak, one who berates him for his running away stunt, which only helps to make Johnny seep into a life of lying and stealing. Johnny even runs away to the spring training camp of the Indians and says that Carl hit him, which leads to his assistant batboy job going away when Mike tells Carl where Johnny is. A friend lures Johnny into helping to steal a car, but a police raid and a near-stabbing stopped by Johnny leads to leniency in juvenile hall. The Indians are pulled into it when Mike tries to adopt Johnny and has the players act as Johnny's godfathers. The nature of Johnny's problem with his stepfather is revealed to involve his mother having locked away the belongings of Johnny's father in a footlocker after he died right before telling him about her new husband, which led to an antagonism between the two. The Novaks keep custody of their child to the approval of Mike. Johnny makes up with Carl, who had secretly been saving money to go to architectural school, just as his father had studied at when he was a boy.

== Cast ==
- George Brent as Mike Jackson
- Lynn Bari as Katherine Jackson
- Rusty Tamblyn as Johnny Barrows
- Tommy Cook as Dan "The Kid" Hudson
- Ann Doran as Emily Barrows Novak
- Louis Jean Heydt as Carl Novak
- K. Elmo Lowe as Dave Joyce/Jake Dawson
- John Beradino as Mac, the Fence

=== Cleveland Indians in the cast ===
as themselves:

- Bill Veeck (Owner and President)
- Lou Boudreau
- Tris Speaker
- Hank Greenberg
- Bob Feller
- Gene Bearden
- Satchel Paige
- Bob Lemon
- Steve Gromek
- Joe Gordon
- Mickey Vernon
- Ken Keltner
- Ray Boone
- Dale Mitchell
- Larry Doby
- Bob Kennedy
- Jim Hegan

=== Uncredited Cleveland Indians in the cast ===
(as themselves)

- Bobby Ávila
- Al Benton
- Allie Clark
- Mike Garcia
- Mel Harder
- Bill McKechnie
- Frank Papish
- Hal Peck
- Mike Tresh
- Thurman Tucker
- Early Wynn
- Sam Zoldak

=== Baseball umpires (special thanks given in the credits) ===
- Bill Grieve
- Bill Summers

== Production ==
Footage from a real Cleveland Indians game is shown during a sequence in the middle of the film. Based on the centerfield scoreboard, the game was played on Sunday, June 5, 1949, as part of a doubleheader with the Philadelphia Athletics. It was an early lead role for Russ Tamblyn.

== See also ==
- List of baseball films
