= Regent Street Cinema =

Historic cinema in London, England

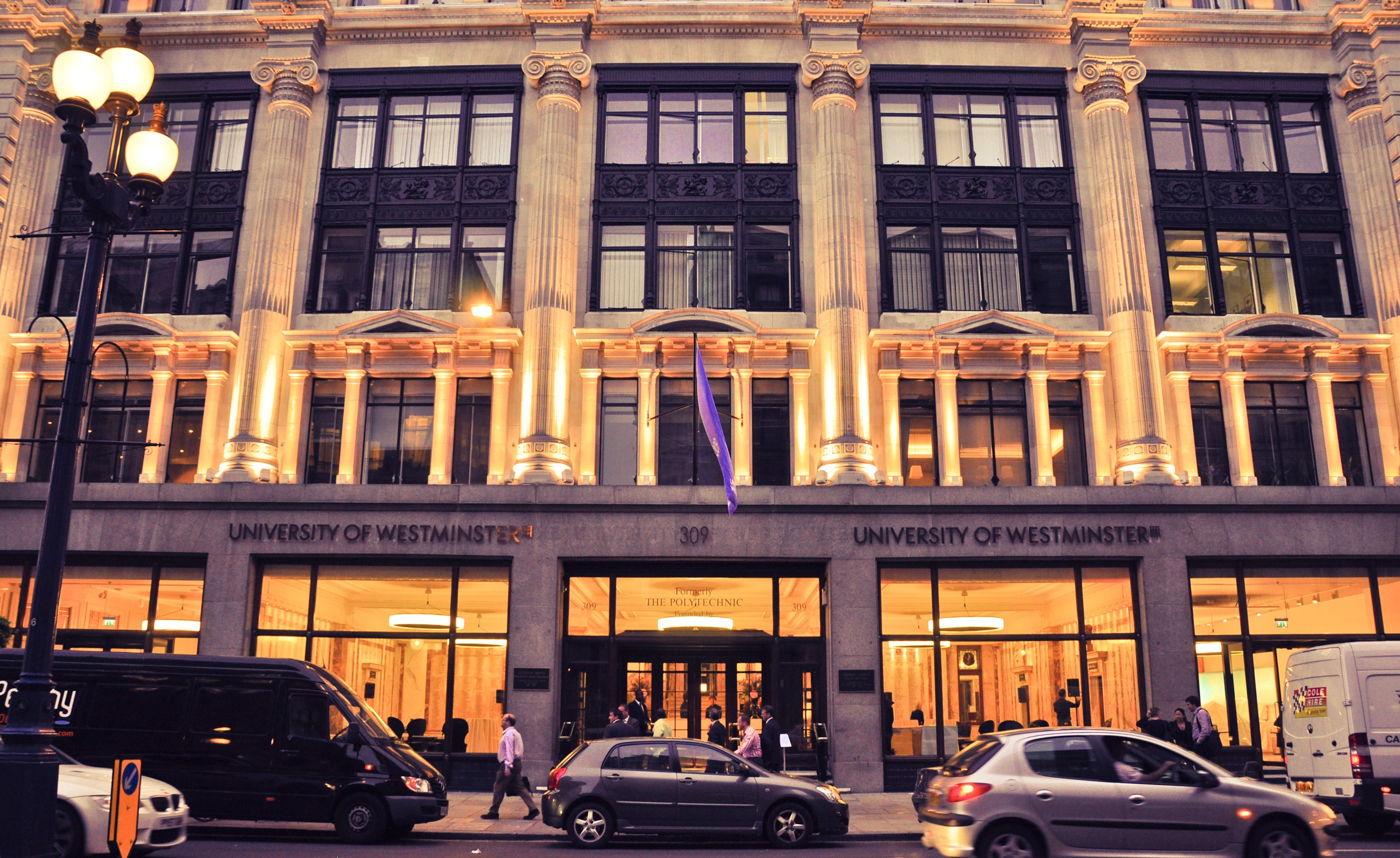
- The University of Westminster
- Interactive map of Regent Street Cinema
- Address: 307 Regent Street, London
- Coordinates: 51.5168359°N 0.1427218°W
- Owner: University of Westminster
- Capacity: 185 seats
- Type: Repertory cinema

Construction
- Opened: 1848
- Renovated: 2012–2015
- Closed: 1980
- Reopened: 2015
- Years active: 1848–1980; 2015–present

Website
- www.regentstreetcinema.com

The Regent Street Cinema is an independent British cinema located on Regent Street, London.

Opened in 1848 and regarded as "the birthplace of British cinema", the cinema featured the first motion picture shown in the United Kingdom. Today, the cinema screens both independent and studio films in the heart of Central London.

== Description ==
Originally opened in 1848, the Regent Street Cinema is an independent cinema located at 307 Regent Street, London and situated next to the University of Westminster. The cinema contains 187 seats, bar and spacious foyer. The cinema is known for having shown the first screening of moving footage in the United Kingdom. It was also the first in the United Kingdom to show an X-rated film. The cinema is able to screen 16 mm, 35 mm and 4K digital formats. The cinema has been described as "the birthplace of British cinema".

== History ==
The Regent Street Cinema was first opened in 1848 and is housed in the flagship building of the Royal Polytechnic Institution (now University of Westminster). When it was first opened, it was used as a theatre. In late February in 1896, the cinema played a short movie by the Lumière Brothers. It was the first motion picture shown in the United Kingdom. In 1951, La Vie Commence Demain (Life Begins Tomorrow), an X-rated film because of its war imagery, (Note: The movie featured atomic bombs, rabbit dissection and artificial insemination.) was shown. The cinema was the first in the United Kingdom to show an X-rated film.

=== Reopening: 1980–2015 ===
Although the cinema continued to screen films for another 84 years after the original Lumière Brothers footage, the cinema was then closed for 35 years, from 1980 to 2015. Throughout most of this time, the cinema was used as a lecture theatre. In 2012, the University of Westminster began a project to restore the building. The restoration project took three years and cost £6.1 million. By February 2014, £4 million was raised through an appeal, but another £2 million was needed. Out of the £6.1 million, £1.5 million was awarded through a Heritage Lottery Fund grant and £2m was donated by the Quintin Hogg Trust. Celebrities including broadcaster Sandi Toksvig and filmmaker Asif Kapadia backed the appeal. It was hoped the cinema would reopen in 2014.

The Art Deco features of the building's 1920 design were restored, along with the 1936 John Compton organ and the dome-like ceiling. Upon reopening in 2016, a documentary of the managers of the English rock band The Who, titled Lambert and Stamp, was screened. Shira MacLeod, the director of the Regent Street Cinema, said it is the only cinema in the UK that can screen films in 16 mm, 35 mm, Super 8 and 4K, allowing it to show films that "have been in archives for many years".

The cinema is a Grade-II listed building.

== Citations ==
Sources

- Manners, Jamie (2015). "Rayners Lane". The Seven Noses of Soho: And 191 Other Curious Details from the Streets of London. Michael O'Mara. ISBN 9781782434610. Archived from the original on 13 May 2022.
