= Aimless Walk =

Czech filmmaker Alexander Hammid

- Czech: Bezúčelná procházka
- Directed by: Alexandr Hackenschmied
- Release date: 1930
- Running time: 9 minutes
- Country: Czechoslovakia
- Language: Silent

Aimless Walk (Bezúčelná procházka) is an unconventional and complex 8-minute film directed by the Czech filmmaker Alexandr Hackenschmied, also known as Alexander Hammid. Released in 1930, the film falls within the experimental documentary genre and is a notable example of European cinema's avant-garde tradition. It has been mentioned alongside city symphony films such as Man with a Movie Camera and Manhatta.

== Synopsis ==
The film presents a non-conventional narrative, offering a visual journey through various urban landscapes. It begins with scenes devoid of human figures, focusing on tram rails, a tram in motion, and notable landmarks in Prague. The protagonist, a man in a suit, embarks on a journey out of the city, exploring the Libeň peninsula and showcasing semi-industrial areas, chimneys, factories, and the Vltava river. A unique doppelganger effect is introduced when the man sits on the grass, creating an intriguing visual sequence. The film concludes as the protagonist boards a tram heading back to Prague, leaving his double behind in Libeň.

== Context within the avant-garde ==
The film's context is linked to the historical avant-garde and the emergence of film as an art form in Czechoslovakia in the 1930. Hackenschmied's work contributed to elevating film to an art form within the avant-garde movement, challenging traditional narrative structures and exploring innovative direction and movement techniques.

== Reception ==
Aimless Walk challenges traditional narrative structures, offering a unique perspective on the city and incorporating the motif of the doppelganger. Described as the "first Czech avant-garde film of international significance" the film deviates from the typical city symphony structure, presenting a distinctive and timeless perspective that transcends contemporary contexts of genre and style.

== Films ==
Martina Kudláček’s documentary Aimless Walk — Alexander Hammid (1996 by Česká Televize & Mina Film).
