= The Ways of Love =

- Directed by: Jean Renoir; Marcel Pagnol; Roberto Rossellini
- Written by: Marcel Pagnol; Roberto Rossellini; Tullio Pinelli; Federico Fellini
- Starring: Sylvia Bataille; Vincent Scotto; Anna Magnani; Federico Fellini
- Release date: 1950

The Ways of Love is a 1950 anthology film.

The film features three segments, Jean Renoir's "A Day in the Country", Marcel Pagnol's "Jofroi", and Roberto Rossellini's "The Miracle".

== L'Amore and The Ways of Love ==
One segment of The Ways of Love, "The Miracle", was originally featured in a 1948 film, L'Amore. In 1950, "The Miracle" was removed from L'Amore for international distribution and placed in The Ways of Love.
