= Target Zero =

1955 film by Harmon Jones

- Theatrical release poster
- Directed by: Harmon Jones
- Written by: James Warner Bellah; Sam Rolfe
- Produced by: David Weisbart
- Starring: Richard Conte; Peggie Castle; Charles Bronson; Richard Wyler; L. Q. Jones; Chuck Connors
- Cinematography: Edwin B. DuPar
- Edited by: Clarence Kolster
- Music by: David Buttolph
- Production company: Warner Bros. Pictures
- Distributed by: Warner Bros. Pictures
- Release date: November 15, 1955
- Running time: 92 minutes
- Country: United States
- Language: English

Target Zero is a 1955 American war and drama film directed by Harmon Jones and written by James Warner Bellah and Sam Rolfe.The film stars Richard Conte, Peggie Castle, Charles Bronson, Richard Wyler, L. Q. Jones and Chuck Connors. The film was released and published by Warner Bros. Pictures on November 15, 1955.

== Plot ==
During a Korean War retreat, United Nations relief worker Ann Galloway is knocked out for hours and her Korean assistant, Sue, killed after their car is forced down a hillside by enemy shell fire. As communist forces advance, she is rescued by the British crew of a U.S. Army M4A3E8 Sherman tank. They are then found by an American patrol led by Lt. Tom Flagler, a soldier's soldier, who is admired by his men. Finding themselves behind enemy lines, they try to break through to rejoin Easy Company on "Sullivan's Muscle," a prominent hilltop they occupy. On the way they acquire a lost mortar team, consisting of Private George and his loader, known only as the "Strangler".

The British sergeant, Kensemmit, bears a grudge against American soldiers because one had misused his sister back in England. He is particularly contemptuous of Flagler. SFC Vince Gaspari vouches for Tom completely as a born leader, although he acknowledges Ann's conclusion that Tom cares about nothing other than his military duty is correct. By contrast the other two British tank soldiers, Harry Fontenoy and Cpt. Devon Enoch, both get along very well with the Americans, and criticize Sgt. Kensemmit for his unnecessary hostile attitude. Pvt. Geronimo, from the Apache reservation in Arizona says to Private Felix O'Hara, a Southern-accented white American soldier, that Native Americans were in this war so that they could get practice fighting for the eventual day when they reconquer the United States.

When the squad returns to "Sullivan's Muscle," Tom discovers that Easy Company has been massacred and their position in the line left open, leaving him dejected. However, under orders to hold the line until help can arrive, they dig the tank in, set up fire zones and are promised air and naval bombardment support. They are ready when the communists climb the hill and open fire, ambushing them at close range. After stopping the enemy with help from Air Force F-80 Shooting Star fighters and a Navy battleship firing its 16-inch guns from coastal waters 20 miles away, Flagler and Kensemmit reconcile their differences, with Kensemmit apologizing. In victory, Flagler and Kensemmit both come to realize that Ann represents the very kind of thing they have been fighting for all along.

== Cast ==
- Richard Conte as Lieutenant Tom Flagler
- Peggie Castle as Ann Galloway
- Charles Bronson as Sergeant First Class Vince Gaspari
- Richard Stapley as Sergeant David Kemsemmit
- L. Q. Jones as Private Felix O'Hara
- Chuck Connors as Private "Moose"
- John Alderson as Corporal Devon Enoch
- Terence De Marney as Private Harry Fontenoy
- Strother Martin as Private Dan O'Hirons (uncredited)
- Aaron Spelling as Private Strangler (uncredited)
- Don Oreck as Private Stacey Della Nueva (uncredited)
- John Dennis as Private First Class George
- Angela Loo as Sue

== Production ==
The F-80 Shooting Star aircraft were flown by the 120th Fighter Squadron of the Colorado Air National Guard. The film was shot at Fort Carson, Colorado and in Arizona.

This is an early appearance of Aaron Spelling, as one of the doomed mortar team. He went on to become a top producer in Hollywood.

== Release ==
The film opened at the Paramount Theatre in New York City but only lasted 8 days with a gross of just $30,000.
