= Library of Congress (film) =

1945 film

- Directed by: Alexander Hammid
- Production company: Office of War Information
- Release date: 1945
- Running time: 20 minutes
- Country: United States
- Language: English

Library of Congress is a 1945 American short documentary film about the Library of Congress, directed by Alexander Hammid, and produced by the Office of War Information. It was nominated for an Academy Award for Best Documentary Short.

Library of Congress was restored from a 35mm nitrate print by the Academy Film Archive in 2006. The film is part of the Academy War Film Collection, one of the largest collections of World War II-era short films held outside government archives.
