= Joseph Burstyn =

Polish-American film distributor

- Born: Jossel Lejba Bursztyn; December 15, 1899; Sokoły, Poland
- Died: November 29, 1953 (aged 53); TWA flight from New York to Rome
- Occupation: film distributor
- Years active: 1930s-1953
- Known for: Joseph Burstyn Inc. vs. Wilson; The Forgotten Village (1941), Rome (1945), Open City (1945), Paisà (1946), The Quiet One (1948), Little Fugitive (1953), Fear and Desire (1953)

Joseph Burstyn (born Jossel Lejba Bursztyn; December 15, 1899 – November 29, 1953) was a Polish-American film distributor who specialized in the commercial release of foreign-language and American independent film productions.

== Life and career ==
Burstyn was born as Jossel Bursztyn to a Jewish family in Sokoły, Poland in 1899. On May 7, 1921, he arrived in the U.S. with his family, parents Pinches Herszko (a merchant; born 1871 to Chaim Wolf and Chaja z Wolfów-Pinchesów Bursztyn) and Gittel "Gitla" Rotbart, and siblings Chaim Kielman, Cypa, Berko, Joel Szloma and Bejla. The family settled in Cleveland, where an aunt lived. His legal name was Joseph Burstein but he later spelled it Burstyn. He became a US citizen in 1934. He initially worked as a public relations representative for the Yiddish theater circuit in New York City before becoming active in film distribution with business partner Arthur Mayer from the late 1930s to the late 1940s.

His most famous releases include The Forgotten Village (1941) written by John Steinbeck, the Roberto Rossellini classics Rome, Open City (1945) and Paisà (1946), The Quiet One (1948), the Academy Award-nominated Little Fugitive (1953), and Fear and Desire (1953), the first feature film directed by Stanley Kubrick.

== Joseph Burstyn Inc. vs. Wilson ==
From 1951-53, Burstyn was at the center of Joseph Burstyn, Inc. v. Wilson, 343 U.S. 495 (1952), which resulted in a landmark decision by the United States Supreme Court which helped end film censorship in New York.

The court decision determined that certain provisions of the New York State Education Law allowing a censor to forbid the commercial showing of any non-licensed motion picture film, or revoke or deny the license of a film deemed to be "sacrilegious", was a "restraint on freedom of speech" and thereby a violation of the First Amendment; in this case, the film in question was "The Miracle", directed by Roberto Rossellini, an Italian short film that was part of the anthology film The Ways of Love (1950).

== Death ==
Burstyn died in November 1953 of a coronary thrombosis during a TWA flight from New York to Rome. He collapsed several hours after the plane took off from Gander, Newfoundland. He was dead when the plane landed at Shannon Airport in Ireland.

== Films distributed by Burstyn ==
Films distributed by Mayer and Burstyn (1933–48)

- Bicycle Thieves (1948)
- The Quiet One (1948)
- Lo Tafhidenu/The Illegals (1948) documentary in Hebrew directed by Meyer Levin
- Paris 1900 (1947)
- Shakuntala (1947)
- Paisan (1946)
- The Battle of the Rails (1946)
- Rome, Open City (1945)
- Marie-Louise (1944)
- Portrait of a Woman (1944)
- Hymn of the Nations (1944)
- The Forgotten Village (1941)
- Lights Out in Europe (1940)
- Louise (1939)
- Crisis (1939)
- Katia (1938)
- Ballerina (1937) English title of Le morte du cygne
- La guerre des gosses (1937) French version of War of the Buttons directed by Jacques Daroy
- Pépé le Moko (1937)
- The Lower Depths (1936)
- Women's Club (1936)
- Die ewige Maske (1935)
- Whirlpool of Desire (1935), French film Remous directed by Edmond T. Gréville
- Song of the Streets (1933)

Films distributed by Joseph Burstyn Inc. (1950-55)

- Stella (1955)
- Romantic Youth (1954)
- Tanga-Tika (1953)
- Little Fugitive (1953)
- Fear and Desire (1953)
- Umberto D. (1952)
- Savage Triangle (1951) English version of Le garcon sauvage
- Miracle in Milan (1951)
- Ways of Love (1950)
- The Flowers of St. Francis (1950)
- Side Street Story (1950)
- Tomorrow Is Too Late (1950)
- Justice Is Done (1950)
- The Berliner (1948)
- A Day in the Country (1936) 1950 US release
- Jofroi (1934) 1950 US re-release
- À Nous la Liberté (1931) 1954 US re-release

== Sources ==
- Wittern-Keller, Laura and Raymond J. Haberski, Jr. The Miracle Case: Film Censorship and the Supreme Court. University Press of Kansas, 2008.
