= Yannick Bellon =

French film director (1924–2019)

Marie-Annick Bellon, usually known as Yannick Bellon, (6 April 1924 – 2 June 2019), was a French film director, editor and screenwriter. Initially known for her documentary work, in 1972 she made her first feature film, Quelque part quelqu’un (Somewhere, Someone), presenting contemporary views of Paris. She went on to make several more feature films, including L'amour violé (Rape of Love) with its feminist insights in 1978 and Les Enfants du désordre in 1989, evoking the difficulties a drug addict experiences when trying to return to normal life.

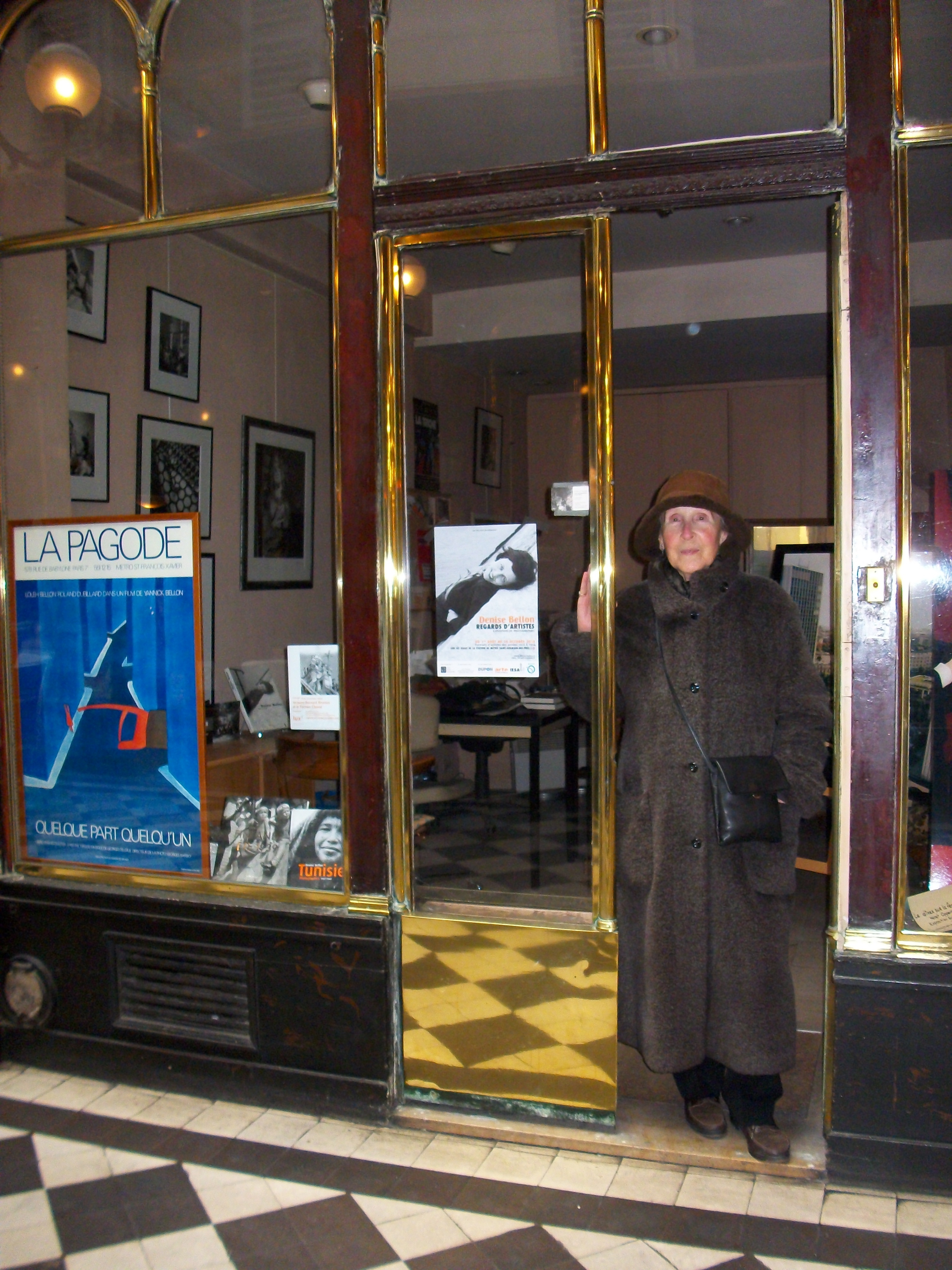
Marie-Annick Bellon, was a French film director and editor.

== Early life and family ==
Born on 6 April 1924 in Biarritz, Marie-Annick Bellon was the daughter of Jacques Bellon, a magistrate, and Denise Simone Hulmann, a photographer. On 23 December 1954, she married the journalist Henry Magnan (1919–1965), divorcing in 1963. She was the elder sister of the actress and playwright Loleh Bellon (1925–1999).

== Professional life ==
After studying for just one year at the Institut des hautes études cinématographiques, she became the assistant of the film editor Myriam Borsoutsky, working on a series of documentaries and on Albert Dubout's cartoons. She went on to help the film director Nicole Védrès with her Paris 1900.

The first film she produced on her own was the documentary Goémons (1947), telling how the inhabitants of the island of Béniguet make use of the local seaweed. It won the Grand Prix for documentaries at the Venice Biennale in 1949. In 1950, she made a half-hour documentary on the French author Colette.

In 1972, she created the production company Les Films de l'Équinoxe, now concentrating on directing a series of feature films. She had no doubt hoped these would reflect the intentions she expressed in 1961 when she said: "If through my works, you conclude that injustice revolts me and dignity seems to me to be the most important virtue, so much the better." Her films do indeed appear to demonstrate this approach, highlighting women's liberation in La Femme de Jean (1974), rape in L'Amour violé (1978), cancer in L'Amour nu (1981) and homosexuality in La Triche (1984).
