= Paris 1900 (film) =

1947 film

- Directed by: Nicole Védrès
- Written by: Pierre Braunberger; Nicole Védrès
- Produced by: Pierre Braunberger; Edward Kingsley; Arthur Mayer
- Narrated by: Claude Dauphin; Monty Woolley (US version)
- Edited by: Yannick Bellon
- Music by: Guy Bernard
- Distributed by: Arthur Mayer & Joseph Burstyn (US)
- Release date: September 1947
- Running time: 74 minutes
- Country: France
- Language: French

Paris 1900 is a 1947 French documentary film directed by Nicole Védrès, and entered into the 1947 Cannes Film Festival.

== Cast ==
- Claude Dauphin as Récitant / Narrator (French version) (voice)
- Mistinguett
- Monty Woolley as Narrator, US version (voice)
