= Walls of Fire =

1971 film

- Directed by: Herbert Kline; Edmund Penney
- Produced by: Gertrude Ross Marks; Edmund F. Penney
- Cinematography: Víctor Gaitán
- Edited by: Gene Fowler Jr.
- Release date: 1971
- Country: United States
- Language: English

Walls of Fire is a 1971 American documentary film directed by Herbert Kline and Edmund Penney. Narrated by Ricardo Montalbán, this documentary examines the history of Mexican murals and their artists. Among the works examined are those by leading Mexican muralists José Clemente Orozco, Diego Rivera and David Alfaro Siqueiros. It was nominated for an Academy Award for Best Documentary Feature. The documentary was also won a Golden Globe award for Best Documentary Film in 1972.

== Cast ==
- José Clemente Orozco as himself
- Diego Rivera as himself
- David Alfaro Siqueiros as himself
