= The Autobiography of a 'Jeep' =

1943 film by Joseph Krumgold

- Directed by: Joseph Krumgold (uncredited)
- Produced by: Office of War Information
- Edited by: Gene Fowler Jr
- Release date: 1943
- Running time: 9 minutes
- Country: United States
- Language: English

The Autobiography of a 'Jeep' is a 1943 propaganda film produced by the US Office of War Information. As its name might suggest, it is the story of parts of World War II told from the perspective of a WW II jeep.

The Jeep tells us he comes from a country with many roads and cars. He mentions pre-war plans for highways and cities that had to be scrapped because of the war, and the sacrifices the personalized Jeep is making for the war effort.

The Jeep then makes his first appearance before the servicemen, his experience in the desert and passing rivers and his nervousness in front of more experienced vehicles like the tank. Finally the Jeep proves his mettle and is put in general production, ridden by presidents and royalty. All this time he is accompanied by his friend, the American soldier.
