= Edmund Penney =

American actor

Edmund Freeman Penney (July 26, 1926 – September 11, 2008) was an American actor, director, and author.

Penney studied at the University of Southern California and gave a winning oration on Patrick Henry. He made a documentary on the Angels Flight funicular in Los Angeles. He wrote The Facts on File Dictionary of Film and Broadcast Terms. He co-authored Millard Sheets : One-Man Renaissance with Janice Lovoos. He was nominated for an Academy Award in the category Documentary Feature for the film Walls of Fire. His nomination was shared with Gertrude Ross Marks.

== Filmography ==
- Angel's Flight (1964) short documentary about the Angels Flight funicular in Los Angeles, California
- The Ballad of Cable Hogue (1970), co-writer
- Walls of Fire (1971), a documentary film about Mexican muralists
- Alice Asmar, Artist (1998), writer and director
- The Dancing Prophet (1999) a documentary about dancer Ruth St. Denis

== Actor ==
- Where Will You Hide? (1948), short film
- Santa and the Fairy Snow Queen (1951), short film as Santa Claus
- Cell 2455 Death Row (1955)
- Adventures of Superman (1956), episode "Peril by Sea", as Guard
- The Ten Commandments (1956) as High Priest
- Teenage Diary (1960), short film, as Russ Martin
- Bud and Lou (1978), television show
- The Jericho Mile (1979)
- The Grace Kelly Story (1983), television film, as Reporter #2
