= Sylvia Bataille =

French actress (1908–1993)

- Born: Sylvia Maklès; 1 November 1908; Paris, France
- Died: 22 December 1993 (aged 85); Paris, France
- Years active: 1933–1950
- Spouses: Georges Bataille (m. 1928; div. 1946) Jacques Lacan (m. 1953; died 1981)

Sylvia Bataille (born Sylvia Maklès; 1 November 1908 – 22 December 1993) (Note: Bataille's year of birth is sometimes given as 1912. See Hunt, footnote on p. 107.) was a French actress of Romanian-Jewish descent. When she was twenty, she married the writer Georges Bataille with whom she had a daughter, the psychoanalyst Laurence Bataille (1930–1986). Georges Bataille and Sylvia separated in 1934 but did not divorce until 1946. Starting in 1938, she was a companion of the psychoanalyst Jacques Lacan with whom, in 1941, she had a daughter, Judith (married name Judith Miller). Sylvia Bataille married Jacques Lacan in 1953.

A pupil of Charles Dullin, Bataille's theatrical debut was with the agit-prop troupe Groupe Octobre, directed by Jacques Prévert. Her film debut came in 1933, and in 1936 she played her most memorable role in Partie de campagne (A Day in the Country) directed by Jean Renoir. Her final appearance was in 1950.

== Filmography ==
- 1930: The Tale of the Fox animated, feature film by Ladislas Starevitch, voice of Rabbit
- 1930: La Joie d'une heure, short film by André Cerf
- 1933: The Faceless Voice by Léo Mittler
- 1934: Por un perro chico, una mujer (Un chien qui raccroche), short film by Santiago de la Concha - Santiago Ontañón
- 1934: Skylark by Jean Tarride
- 1935: His Excellency Antonin by Charles-Félix Tavano
- 1936: Topaze by Marcel Pagnol
- 1936: Rose by Raymond Rouleau
- 1936: Partie de campagne by Jean Renoir
- 1936: Œil de lynx, détective by Pierre-Jean Ducis
- 1936: The Crime of Monsieur Lange by Jean Renoir
- 1936: Jenny by Marcel Carné
- 1937: Vous n'avez rien à déclarer? by Léo Joannon
- 1937: Le Gagnant (short film) by Yves Allégret
- 1937: The Courier of Lyon by Maurice Lehmann and Claude Autant-Lara
- 1937: Forfaiture (released as The Cheat in English) by Marcel L'Herbier
- 1937: White Cargo by Robert Siodmak
- 1938: Frères corses by Géo Kelber
- 1938: People Who Travel (Les Gens du voyage in French) by Jacques Feyder
- 1939: Le Château des quatre obèses by Yvan Noé
- 1939: Serge Panine by Charles Méré
- 1939: L'Étrange nuit de Noël by Yvan Noé
- 1939: Latin Quarter by Pierre Colombier
- 1940: Hangman's Noose by Léon Mathot
- 1940: Camp Thirteen by Jacques Constant
- 1941: L'Enfer des anges by Christian-Jaque
- 1945: Ils étaient cinq permissionnaires by Pierre Caron
- 1946: Gates of the Night by Marcel Carné
- 1948: Ulysse ou Les Mauvaises Rencontres, short film (also known as Aller et retour) by Alexandre Astruc
- 1948: L'Amore, anthology film by Roberto Rossellini
- 1950: Julie de Carneilhan by Jacques Manuel
