= La Vie Commence Demain =

1950 film by Nicole Védrès

La vie commence demain is a 1950 French film directed by Nicole Védrès. It was the first X-rated film shown in the United Kingdom. It was screened at the Regent Street Cinema in London in 1951.
