= Laurence Bataille =

French physician, psychoanalyst and writer (1930–1986)

- Born: 10 June 1930; Boulogne-Billancourt, France
- Died: 10 May 1986 (aged 55); Paris, France
- Occupations: Physician, psychoanalyst, writer
- Spouse: André Basch (m. 1961; div. 1971)
- Children: 1
- Parents: Georges Bataille (father); Sylvia Bataille (mother)
- Relatives: Jacques Lacan (stepfather); Jacques-Alain Miller (brother-in-law)

Laurence Bataille (10 June 1930 – 10 May 1986) was a French physician, psychoanalyst and writer. She was the only daughter of the writer Georges Bataille and the actress Sylvia Bataille. After ten years of marriage, in 1971 she divorced André Basch, by whom she had a daughter. Stepdaughter of Jacques Lacan, from 1976 to 1978 she directed the review of the Freudian School of Paris Ornicar?.

== Works ==
- L'ombilic du rêve: d'une pratique de la psychanalyse, 1987
