= Herbert Kline =

American filmmaker

Herbert Kline (March 13, 1909 – 1999) was an American filmmaker.

== Biography ==
Herbert Kline was born on March 13, 1909 in Chicago as Herbert Klein and raised in Davenport, Iowa. He edited a theater magazine, staged Clifford Odets' plays, and was involved in Leftist organizations. He was blacklisted during the 1950s.

He returned to filmmaking in the 1970s. His documentary films and dramas covered the Spanish Civil War, Nazi invasion of Czechoslovakia, Nazi takeover of Europe, Holocaust survivors' journey to Mandatory Palestine, a World Series championship in Cleveland, the Mexican Revolution, and a film about modern art.

He married Rose Margaret Harvan and after they divorced married Josine Ianco-Starrels with whom he had two children, a son and daughter.

He wrote the book New Theater And Film, 1934–1937.

MoMA restored and screened two of his World War II era films.

== Filmography ==
- Heart of Spain, documentary about the Spanish Civil War made with photographer Géza Kárpáthi
- Return to Life, made in collaboration with Henri Cartier-Bresson
- Love Is a Headache (1938), co-writer
- Crisis (1939), a documentary about the Sudeten Crisis directed by Herbert Kline, Hans Burger, and Alexander Hammid
- Lights Out in Europe (1940), a documentary
- The Forgotten Village (1941), a documentary film (some sources call it an ethnofiction) directed by Herbert Kline and Alexander Hammid from John Steinbeck's writing and screenplay
- Cinco fueron escogidos (Five Were Chosen) (1943), a Mexican film set in Yugoslavia
- Youth Runs Wild (1944), co-writer
- Boogie-Woogie Dream (1944), co-director
- A Boy, a Girl and a Dog (1946), director
- My Father's House, director, about a Holocaust survivor immigrating to Mandatory Palestine made with writer Meyer Levin
- The Kid from Cleveland (1949)
- Illegal Entry (1949), an immigration themed crime drama
- The Fighter(1952), director, a film about the Mexican Revolution
- Walls of Fire (1971), about Mexican muralists
- The Challenge... A Tribute to Modern Art (1974), narrated by Orson Welles, (nominated for Best Documentary Film at the 47th Academy Awards winner)
- Acting: Lee Strasberg and the Actors Studio (1981) about Lee Strasberg and the Actors Studio
