= Nicole Védrès =

French film director, author

- Born: Nicole Rais; 4 September 1911; Paris, France
- Died: 20 November 1965 (aged 54); Paris, France
- Burial place: Montparnasse Cemetery, Paris
- Occupation: Film director
- Years active: 1947–1953
- Spouse: Marcel Cravenne

Nicole Védrès (4 September 1911 – 20 November 1965), born Nicole Henriette Désirée Charlotte Cahen dit Nathan dit Rais, was a French author, columnist, essayist, journalist, screenwriter and film director.

== Life and work ==
Védrès was born on 4 September 1911 in Paris. An important figure in the post-war French cultural world, she signed several articles under different names, including “Nathan” and “Rais.”

Nicole Vedrès was the daughter of Jules Rais, doctor of law, librarian of the Chamber of Deputies and art critic, and Ludmila Savitzky, of Russian origin and who was a translator of works by James Joyce.

Although Vedrès studied international law, she began a career as a journalist in the 1930s, writing for women's magazines and literary journals such as the Mercure de France. During the war, she wrote in Le Rouge et le Bleu in 1941–1942.

=== Filmmaker ===
Védrès began her career as a screenwriter and documentary filmmaker in 1947, with Paris 1900, where, assisted by Yannick Bellon and Alain Resnais, she explored the archives of current affairs of the Belle Époque. The film premiered at the Cannes Film Festival and won both the Louis-Delluc Prize. and the Méliès Prize.

She also embarked on a career as a novelist and published seven novels in all, most of them published by Éditions Gallimard.

In 1949, her film Life Begins Tomorrow proposes in a sensitive and modern way, like a docufiction, to watch Jean-Pierre Aumont who portrays a young provincial commercial employee disgusted by his time, at the meeting of French intellectuals: Jean-Paul Sartre, André Gide, Le Corbusier, Pablo Picasso, Jean Rostand, Irène Joliot-Curie, André Labarthe, Daniel Lagache, Jacques Prévertand and others are also mentioned.

She was a regular contributor to the literary television program Lectures for All, which she hosted from 1957 with Pierre Dumayet.

=== Personal life ===
In 1962, Védrès married the director Marcel Cravenne (also known as Marcel Cohen).

She died three years later, 20 November 1965 at the age of 54. Her play, Les Canaques, based on her earlier work Les Niaoulis, was published soon after her death in 1966.

== Selected works ==
=== Films ===
- Paris 1900 (1947)
- La Vie Commence Demain (1950) released in the US as Life Begins Tomorrow
- Aux frontières de l'homme (1953) co-directed with Jean Rostand

=== Novels ===
- The Labyrinth or Sir Arthur's Garden, Fontaine, 1946.
- Christophe or the Choice of Arms, Seuil, 1948.
- The Red Strings, Gallimard, 1953.
- The Executor, Gallimard, 1958.
- The Distant Beast, Gallimard, 1960.
- The End of September, Gallimard, 1962.
- The Hotel d'Albe, Gallimard, 1963.

=== Theater ===
- The Canaques, Seuil, 1966.

== Awards ==
- Louis-Delluc Prize and Méliès Prize for Paris 1900
- Durchon-Louvet Prize from the French Academy in 1961 for her life's work
