= Gustave Tempelaere =

Gustave Tempelaere (1840-1904), was a French art dealer in Paris.

In 1865 he married Felicité Brame, the sister of the dealer Hector Brame (1831-1899). Tempelaere installed his own gallery on the same street as his brother in law, the rue Laffitte. Tempelaere represented artists such as François-Saint Bonvin and Henri Fantin-Latour.
