= The Forgotten Village =

1941 film by Alexandr Hackenschmied

- Theatrical release poster
- Directed by: Herbert Kline; Alexander Hammid
- Screenplay by: John Steinbeck
- Story by: John Steinbeck
- Produced by: Alexander Hammid; Herbert Kline
- Narrated by: Burgess Meredith
- Cinematography: Alexander Hammid
- Edited by: Herbert Kline
- Music by: Hanns Eisler
- Production companies: Pan-American Films, Inc
- Distributed by: Arthur Mayer & Joseph Burstyn
- Release dates: 9 September 1941 (New York City); 18 November 1941 (U.S.)
- Running time: 67 minutes
- Country: United States
- Languages: English; Spanish

The Forgotten Village is a 1941 American docufiction film — some sources call it an ethnofiction film — directed by Herbert Kline and Alexander Hammid. Filmed in Mexico with local non-actors, it depicts life in a remote traditional pueblo where a folk healer comes into conflict with a teacher and outsiders who want to introduce modern medicine.

The story and screenplay were written by John Steinbeck, narration voiced by Burgess Meredith, and music scored by Hanns Eisler. Distribution was by the partnership of Arthur Mayer & Joseph Burstyn.

The New York State Board of Regents, acting as the state's board of censors, banned the film in New York due to the film's portrayal of childbirth and showing a baby at its mother's breast.

== Plot summary ==
Esperanza and her oldest son Juan Diego belong to a Mexican peasant family who live and grow corn near a remote mountain village known as Santiago. She is keen to consult Trini, a local wise woman, as to the gender, health and future fortune of her unborn baby. The news is good as Trini casts a prophecy for a healthy boy and the family — the unnamed father, two younger sons (Carlos and little Paco) and some daughters — receive the good tidings with relief. Ventura, the landowner that the family works for, also offers congratulations, but declines to increase their rations for an extra mouth. The family is seen going about their traditional activities: harvesting, shelling, cooking, and selling their produce on market day. Little Paco develops a stomachache, but little attention is paid as Trini is called in to oversee the labor and delivery. The child is indeed a healthy boy whom they name Santiago, after their hometown. When time allows Trini turns her attention, and her magic spells, to Paco who has now developed a worrisome fever. Meanwhile, both Juan Diego and the local schoolteacher have become aware that sickness has begun afflicting many households in the community, not just one. Trini, who attributes the epidemic to evil "airs", intensifies her treatments with ever more powerful spells, but to no avail. Little Paco dies and the family grimly endures the traditional funeral "celebration", unable to enjoy the obligatory upbeat mariachi music. More cases of sickness among the village children emerge, including one of Juan Diego's own sisters. The teacher suspects that the cause is the local drinking water and sends Juan Diego with a letter to public health authorities in the distant capital city; this is a daunting prospect for Juan Diego who must go alone (his family disapproves) despite never having traveled more than 10 miles away from home. After initial reluctance, owing to lack of resources, a government doctor agrees to travel with the boy from the city to the village along with a medical team. After examinations and investigations, he discovers contaminated water which he can address with disinfection (of the well) and diagnoses waterborne illness, which he can treat with serum therapy (for the patients). The medical team, however, is met with intense hostility from Trini who quickly convinces all of the villagers that the "horse blood men" (they have been told that the offered serum is derived from horses) intend only to harm them with their exotic and baffling procedures. The team is angrily expelled from the village by the mob. In the dead of night, Juan Diego spirits his deathly ill sister to the outskirts of the village where she receives the serum from the team. When he returns home, however, he is confronted by his father and shunned by his family for so shaming them. He rejoins the doctor and team and travels with them to the city where he will seek an education and new life. On the way, the doctor is optimistic and assures him that his sister will recover and that modernity and progress will, in the end, prevail.

== Censorship ==
The Hays Office refused to approve the film. The distributors decided to release the film without the Hays Office's Seal of Approval. The New York State Board of Regents banned the film because of the inclusion of a lengthy childbirth scene. But the film’s distributor protested to the State Board of Regents who lifted the ban and allowed the uncut film to be shown in New York.

== Restoration and re-release ==
A restored version of the film was released in 2011. The film was restored by the UCLA Film & Television Archive, funded by the Packard Humanities Institute.

The new print was made “from the original 35mm nitrate picture and soundtrack negatives from the Stanford Theatre Foundation Collection and a 35mm nitrate fine grain master positive from MOMA.”

The restoration premiered at the UCLA Festival of Preservation on March 14, 2011 and was screened at other North American cities in 2011 including Vancouver.

== See also ==
- List of films in the public domain in the United States
