= Musicians Foundation =

American non-profit organization

The Musicians Foundation is a non-profit granting organization that awards aid to U.S.-based professional musicians in need of assistance due to personal crisis, issues of health, natural disaster, or other emergency situations. It was started in 1914 when an organization known as "The Bohemians" (New York Musicians Club) took the first step toward establishing a fund for their fellow musicians by producing a concert featuring several distinguished artists of the day. Now its own organization, the Musicians Foundation gives grants to musicians of all genres and from all over the United States.
