= The Private Life of a Cat =

- Directed by: Alexander Hammid
- Release date: 1947
- Running time: 22 minutes
- Country: United States
- Language: Silent (English intertitles)

The Private Life of a Cat is a 1947 black and white experimental documentary film directed by Alexander Hammid with narration by Maya Deren. Archive.org summarizes the film as an "intimate study" of a female cat who gives birth to a litter of kittens and shows their maturation.

== Synopsis ==
The Private Life of a Cat (1947)

The film is entirely silent and shot from the cat's eye-level; "He", an all white short-haired male cat, grooms "She", a fluffier female. After two months they find a spot "for the family", and soon after the mother goes into labour. The film shows graphically the kittens being born without the help of human hands, and then getting nursed and washed by their mother. The kittens grow, and the parent cats roam freely around their owners' apartment (Hammid and Deren). The kittens learn how to walk and begin to get more active, playing with each other and clawing various furniture. The film then ends by showing the same scene from the beginning where "He" courts "She".

== Reputation ==
Top Documentary Films rates The Private Life of a Cat 7.70/10 stars, saying that it is "very touching", and that it is "[b]eautifully photographed and executed. With subtitles, no dialog, and a refreshing absence of human beings on screen." Dangerous Minds wrote "[t]his beautiful 1944 silent film from husband-and-wife team Maya Deren and Alexander Hammid is quite possibly the only evidence we need that cats are the ultimate well-spring of creativity."
