= Partie de campagne =

A Day in the Country
- 1946 French release poster
- Directed by: Jean Renoir
- Screenplay by: Jean Renoir
- Based on: "Une partie de campagne" by Guy de Maupassant
- Produced by: Pierre Braunberger
- Starring: Sylvia Bataille; Georges D'Arnoux; Jane Marken; André Gabriello; Jacques B. Brunius
- Cinematography: Claude Renoir
- Edited by: Marinette Cadix; Marguerite Renoir
- Music by: Joseph Kosma
- Production company: Panthéon Productions
- Distributed by: Joseph Burstyn Inc. (1950 US release)
- Release date: 8 May 1946
- Running time: 40 minutes
- Country: France
- Language: French

Partie de campagne (pronounced [paʁ.ti də kɑ̃.paɲ]; English: A Day in the Country) is a French featurette that was written and directed by Jean Renoir in 1936, but not edited and released until 1946. It is based on the short story "Une partie de campagne" (1881) by Guy de Maupassant, who was a friend of Renoir's father, the renowned painter Auguste Renoir. The film chronicles a love affair over a summer afternoon in 1860, along the banks of the Seine.

== Plot ==
One Sunday in 1860, Monsieur Dufour, a shop-owner from Paris, takes his family for a day of relaxation in the country. When they stop for lunch at Poulain's roadside restaurant, two young men there, Henri and Rodolphe, take an interest in Dufour's wife and daughter, Henriette. They discuss how they can get alone with the women, and decide to offer to take them out on the river in their skiffs, while distracting Dufour and his shop assistant and future son-in-law, Anatole, by lending them fishing poles. Although the plan was for Rodolphe to woo Henriette, leaving her mother for Henri, Henri changes his mind and puts Henriette in his skiff. Rodolphe good-naturedly settles for Madame Dufour.

The two boats quickly separate. As Henri rows, Henriette expresses her enthusiasm for the countryside. Henri says she could come visit again, on her own, by train if necessary, and offers to meet her, but Henriette responds that her father would never permit it. They go ashore at a secluded spot on the riverbank, which Henri refers to as his "private office". Henriette initially resists his amorous advances, but soon gives in. The rain that has been threatening to fall all afternoon finally arrives.

Years pass and Henriette marries Anatole. One Sunday, Henri goes back to the place where he seduced Henriette and sees her there next to Anatole, who is sleeping. She goes over to Henri, and they wistfully reminisce about their afternoon together. Anatole wakes up and calls for Henriette and Henri hides while they get in their boat and leave.

== Cast ==
- Sylvia Bataille as Henriette Dufour
- Georges D'Arnoux (credited as Georges Saint-Saens) as Henri
- Jane Marken (credited as Jeanne Marken) as Madame Dufour
- André Gabriello as Monsieur Dufour
- Jacques B. Brunius (credited as Jacques Borel) as Rodolphe
- Paul Temps as Anatole
- Gabrielle Fontan as Grandmother
- Jean Renoir as Père Poulain
- Marguerite Renoir as Waitress

== Production and release ==
Future leading directors Jacques Becker and Luchino Visconti worked on the film as Renoir's assistant director and set dresser, respectively. The film was shot in July, soon after France had elected the Popular Front government, and employers had negotiated the Matignon agreement, providing wage increases, 40-hour weeks, trade union rights, paid holidays, and improved social services.

Renoir never finished production on the film due to weather problems, but, ten years later, Marguerite Renoir (a film editor and Renoir's partner at the time of filming) and her sister Marinette Cadix edited the material that was shot, and producer Pierre Braunberger released Partie de campagne in 1946. Joseph Burstyn released the film in the U.S. in 1950 as part of the anthology The Ways of Love.
