= Alexandr Hackenschmied =

American film director, photographer, actor, film editor and cinematographer

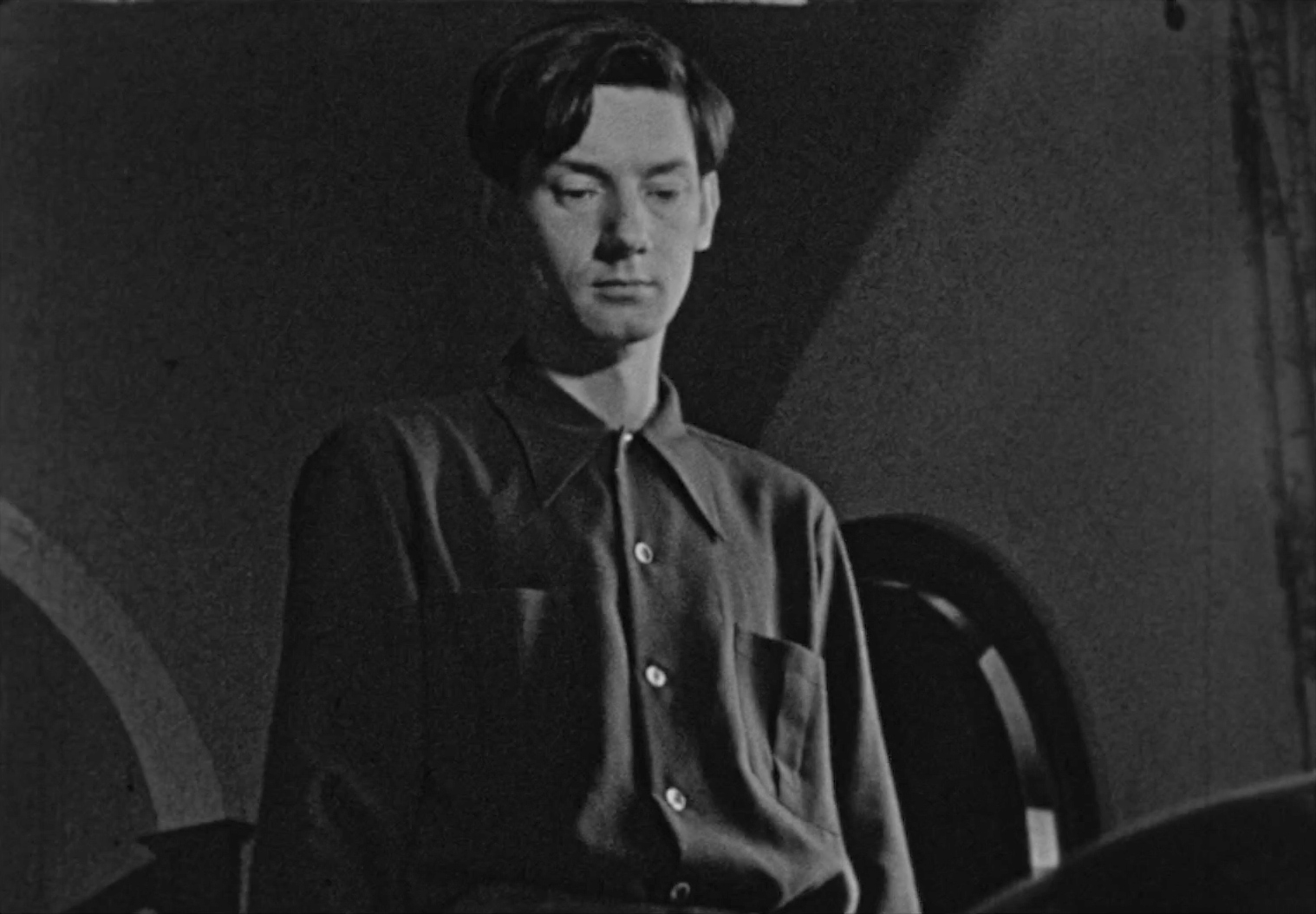
- Alexander Hammid in a screenshot of the short film Meshes of the Afternoon (1943)
- Born: 17 December 1907; Linz, Austria-Hungary
- Died: 26 July 2004 (aged 96); New York City, U.S.
- Occupations: Film director; photographer; cinematographer; film editor
- Spouse(s): Maya Deren (m. 1942–1947) Hella Heyman (m. 1948; died 1992)

Alexandr Hackenschmied, born Alexander Siegfried George Hackenschmied, known later as Alexander Hammid (17 December 1907 – 26 July 2004), was a Czech-American photographer, film director, cinematographer and film editor. He immigrated to the U.S. in 1938 and became involved in American avant-garde cinema. He is best known for three films: Crisis (1939), Meshes of the Afternoon (1943) and To Be Alive! (1964). He made Meshes of the Afternoon with Maya Deren, to whom he was married from 1942 to 1947. His second marriage was to the photographer Hella Heyman, who had also collaborated with Hammid and Deren on several films.

He won the 1965 Academy Award for Best Documentary (Short Subject) for To Be Alive! (1964), which he co-directed with Francis Thompson.

Born in Linz, Austria-Hungary to the son of a schoolteacher, he changed his name to Alexander Hammid when he became a citizen of the United States in 1942. He is best known for his work in documentary film, both as a director, cameraman, and editor.

== Career ==
According to Jaroslav Anděl's biography of Hackenschmied, in 1930, Hackenschmied created his first film Bezúčelná procházka (Aimless Walk) which inaugurated the movement of avant-garde film in Czechoslovakia. The same year he also organized the Exhibition of New Czech Photography in the Aventinská Mansarda—a showcase for artists of the Aventinum publishing house in Prague—and the first show of European avant-garde films in the Kotva Cinema, also in Prague. He contributed to the illustrated weekly Pestrý týden and also published a number of articles on photography and film, in which he formulated the new aesthetics of both fields.

Before emigrating from Czechoslovakia, Hackenschmied worked for the Baťa Film Studio in Zlín, founded by Jan Antonín Baťa in the 1930s who hired young filmmakers and artists to develop modern films, primarily for advertising. While employed there, Hackenschmied made numerous advertising and documentary films. One of the most famous was a four minute commercial for Bata tires called The Highway Sings. Created together with director Elmar Klos and cinematographer Jan Lukas in 1937, it featured an avant-garde style montage of auto tires in motion.

During the late 1930s he collaborated with the American filmmaker Herbert Kline on the feature-length documentary Crisis (1939) and moved to the United States where he met and married Maya Deren. Together they made Meshes of the Afternoon (1943), an experimental film with the directors playing the two protagonists. He also directed the documentaries The Forgotten Village (1941), The Valley of the Tennessee (1944), and A Better Tomorrow (1945). Hammid also made the 22-minute short The Private Life of a Cat (1947). This short film was part narrative, part documentary about cats and their daily lives. The film starts off with two cats, a male and a female. The female is eventually impregnated by the male cat, and begins to search for shelter for when she gives birth to her kittens. The film shows her giving birth to five kittens in graphic detail.

In 1944, he directed a documentary featuring conductor Arturo Toscanini, Hymn of the Nations, produced by the Office of War Information. He also appeared in Maya Deren's At Land (1944), a 15-minute silent experimental film. His documentary Library of Congress (1945) was nominated for an Academy Award for Best Short Documentary. Through the 1950s and 1960s Hammid made documentaries. In 1951, Hackenschmied and Gian Carlo Menotti co-directed the film version of Menotti's opera The Medium.

Hammid directed his final film, To Be Alive! (1964), for screening at the 1964 New York World's Fair. The film won an Academy Award for Best Documentary Short in 1965.

Hammid worked in partnership with filmmaker Francis Thompson for over 25 years, producing numerous "in-house" documentaries as well as several films for general viewership. One of the best known of these is the first IMAX format film, To Fly! (1976), which premiered at the Smithsonian Institution's National Air and Space Museum (NASM) at the museum's grand opening celebration on July 1, 1976. Produced in conjunction with MacGillivray Freeman Films, it continues to play regularly at the Air and Space Museum.

During his years with Francis Thompson, Inc., Hammid went on to be involved with several other early IMAX films. Graeme Ferguson, co-founder of IMAX Corporation (speaking at Francis Thompson's memorial service in 2004) recalled how he had wanted Hammid and Thompson to make the first commercial IMAX films because of their extensive work in earlier large-scale multi-screen films including To Be Alive! (which won an Oscar after being shown at the New York World's Fair in 1964), We Are Young (on six screens for the Montreal World's Fair/Expo 67 in 1967) and US (for San Antonio's Hemisfair in 1969).

== Death ==
Hammid died in July 2004 in his Manhattan apartment. He was 96.

== Legacy ==
Austrian film director, Martina Kudláček directed, documentary, Aimless Walk: Alexander Hammid (1996) based on his life and work. In 2006, MoMA organized a tribute film exhibition titled, "Alexander Hammid: A Memorial Salute" based on its film archives.

The Academy Film Archive has preserved Arturo Toscanini: Conducting Music of Giuseppe Verdi and Library of Congress by Alexandr Hackenschmied.

== Filmography ==
=== Director ===
- Aimless Walk (1930)
- The Prague Castle (1932)
- Crisis (1939)
- The Forgotten Village (1941)
- Meshes of the Afternoon (1943)
- Valley of the Tennessee (1944)
- The Private Life of a Cat (1944)
- Hymn of the Nations (1944)
- Library of Congress (1945)
- A Better Tomorrow (1945)
- Marriage Today (1950)
- Angry Boy (1950)
- Of Men and Music (1951)
- The Gentleman in Room 6 (1951)
- Power Among Men (1959)
- To Be Alive! (1964)
- U.S. (1968)
- To Fly! (1976)

=== Editor ===
- Loupežník (1931)
- Zem spievá (1933, The Earth Sings)
- A život jde dál (1935)
- Crisis (1939)
- The Photographer (1948)
- The Medium (1951)
- Miracle in Java (1956)
- Out (1957)
- To Be Alive! (1964)

== See also ==
- Book: Michael Omasta (ed.): Tribute to Sasha (Vienna: SYNEMA, 2002) (German/English)
- Documentary Film: Aimless Walk: Alexander Hammid (1996, 48 minutes) directed by Martina Kudlacek
