= List of compositions by Arlene Sierra =

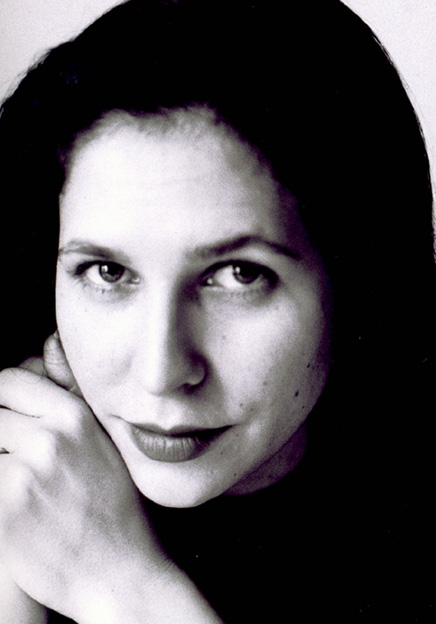
Arlene Sierra

This is a list of compositions by Arlene Sierra.

== Works for orchestra ==
- Kiskadee for Orchestra (2023)
- Butterfly House for Chamber Orchestra (2022)
- Bird Symphony for Orchestra (2021)
- Nature Symphony for Orchestra (2017)
- Moler for Orchestra (2012)
- Game of Attrition for Chamber Orchestra (2009)
- Aquilo for Orchestra (2001)
- Aquae for Orchestra (2000)
- Ballistae for Orchestra (2000)
- Mantegna Diptych for Orchestra (2000)

== Soloist and orchestra ==
- Art of War Concerto for Piano and Orchestra (2010)
- Dedication and Dance Trombone Concerto for Orchestra or Symphonic Winds (1994, revised 2003)

== Wind ensemble ==
- Dedication and Dance Trombone Concerto for Orchestra or Symphonic Winds (1994, revised 2003)

== Large ensemble (7 or more players) ==
- Colmena for 14 Players (2008)
- Cicada Shell for Septet (2006)
- Tiffany Windows for 12 players (2002)
- Four Choreographic Studies for 10 Players (2001)
- Ballistae for 13 Players (2000)

== Soloist and large ensemble (7 or more players) ==
- Neruda Settings for Soprano and Chamber Ensemble (2002–5)

== Works for 2 to 6 players ==
- Butterflies Remember a Mountain for Piano Trio (2013)
- Avian Mirrors for Violin and Cello (2013)
- Insects in Amber String Quartet (2010)
- Surrounded Ground for Sextet (2008)
- A Conflict of Opposites for Violin or Clarinet and Piano (2005)
- Truel for Piano Trio or Clarinet Trio (2004–7)
- Truel 1 for Piano Trio or Clarinet Trio (2002–3)
- Counting-Out Rhyme for Cello and Piano (2002)
- Zwei Huhner for Oboe and Trombone (200o)
- Harrow-Lines for Quintet (1999)
- of Risk and Memory for Two Pianos (1997)
- Four Love Songs for Viola and Piano (1993)
- Duo for Violoncelli (1993)

== Solo works ==
- Whitman Fragment Cello Solo (2024)
- Birds and Insects, Book 3 for Solo Piano and Recorded Birdsong (2023)
- Birds and Insects, Book 2 for Solo Piano and Recorded Birdsong (2015–18)
- Cricket-Viol for Solo Viola/Voice (2010)
- Birds and Insects, Book 1 Piano Solo (2007)
- The Art of Lightness Flute Solo (2006)
- Two Etudes After Mantegna Cello Solo (1998)

== Solo voice and up to 6 players ==
- Hearing Things for Soprano and Piano (2008)
- Streets and Rivers for Baritone and Piano (2007)
- Two Neruda Odes for Soprano, Cello and Piano (2004)
- Hand Mit Ringen for Soprano and Trio (2002)
- Three Descriptions for Soprano and Piano (1997)

== Electroacoustic works ==
- Urban Birds for 3 Pianos with Percussion and Recorded Birdsong (2014)
- Birds and Insects, Book 2 for Solo Piano and recorded birdsong (2015–18)

== Works with film ==
- Studies in Choreography chamber ensemble score to two Maya Deren films (2019)
- Ritual in Transfigured Time chamber ensemble score to the Maya Deren film (2016)
- Meditation on Violence chamber ensemble score to the Maya Deren film (2012)

== Opera and music theatre ==
- Cuatro Corridos – Dalia Opera Scena for Soprano and Ensemble (2013)
- Faustine Opera in one act for 5 Singers and Orchestra (2011–)

== Dance ==
- Four Choreographic Studies for 10 Players (2001)

== Chorus ==
- Cristo no tiene cuerpo for Unaccompanied SATB (2024)
- Alike Dissolving for SATB, Children's Choir and String Orchestra (2001)
- Alike Dissolving for Unaccompanied SATB (2001)
- Alleluia (Bitter-Sweet) for four men's voices or SATB Chorus (2000)
