= Voodoo in popular culture =

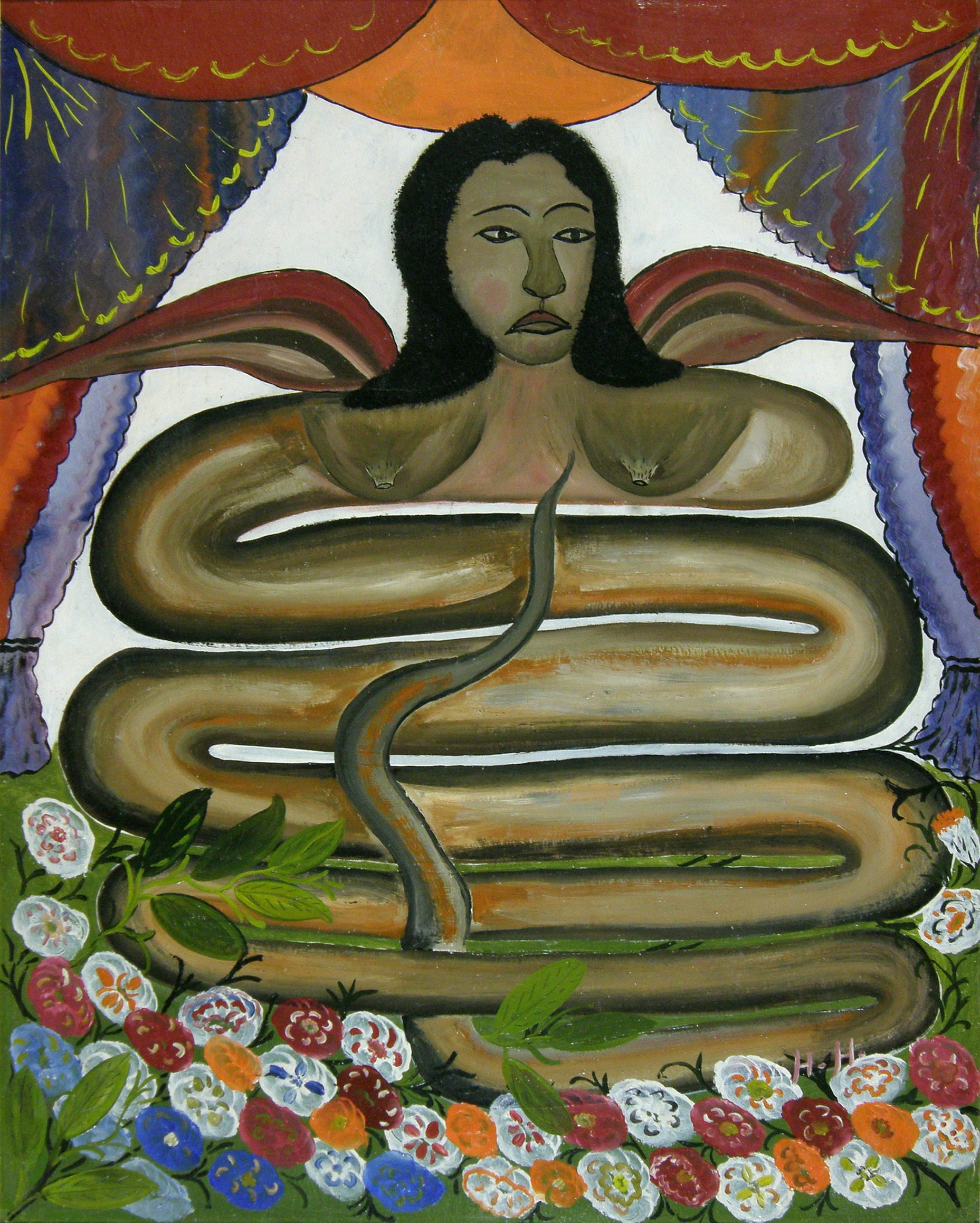
A painting of the lwa Damballa, a serpent, by Haitian artist Hector Hyppolite.

Popular culture has included various depictions of practices associated with different forms of voodoo, including Haitian Vodou and Louisiana Voodoo, and other elements attributed to African diaspora religions, with such representations often deviating substantially from any actual voodoo practices or beliefs. Tropes regarding voodoo appear most often in supernatural fantasy or horror films, with common themes including the activity of witch doctors, the summoning or control of dark spirits, use of voodoo dolls to inflict pain on people remotely, and the creation of zombies.

== Background ==
The word "Vodou" comes from the Fon language (spoken in Benin) meaning "spirit" or "god". As the original practice of Haitian Vodou, tribes would worship the spirits of ancestors and believed that followers were possessed by immortal spirits. During the seventeenth century, these practices were banned by slave owners, causing the slaves to practice in private. Slave owners threatened to baptize the slaves if they did not stop worshipping Vodou. Due to these threats, slaves practiced Vodou in private while incorporating Catholic traditions into them. They incorporated hymns and prayers, which are still seen in modern day Vodou.

Vodou became "Voodoo" once it was brought to New Orleans' French Quarter. Once in New Orleans' aspects of Vodou changed, including the wearing of charms for protection, healing and harming others. A key figure in the popularization of Vodou was Marie Laveau. Laveau lived in New Orleans during the initial times of Voodoo, becoming a pillar within the community. She learned and expanded her knowledge on Voodoo from Dr. John Bayou, a well known conjurer. Due to Laveau's popularity at the time, she was able to connect with members in her community by giving then advice and guidance. She was said to have healing powers and gifting the poor. Because of Laveau's popularity, her house is now a common attraction in New Orleans.

== Early instances ==
The 1932 film White Zombie originated several fictional tropes regarding Voodoo.

One of the first books to expose Western culture to the concept of the voodoo zombie was The Magic Island (1929) by W. B. Seabrook. This is the sensationalized account of a narrator who encounters voodoo cults in Haiti and their resurrected thralls. Time commented that the book "introduced 'zombi' into U.S. speech". Zombies have a complex literary heritage, with antecedents ranging from Richard Matheson and H. P. Lovecraft to Mary Shelley's Frankenstein drawing on European folklore of the undead. Victor Halperin directed White Zombie (1932), a horror film starring Bela Lugosi. Here zombies are depicted as mindless, unthinking henchmen under the spell of an evil magician. Zombies, often still using this voodoo-inspired rationale, were initially uncommon in cinema, but their appearances continued sporadically through the 1930s to the 1960s, with films including Jacques Tourneur's I Walked with a Zombie (1943), and Plan 9 from Outer Space (1959).

== Derivations ==
Various scholars describe the form of the religion practiced in Haiti, Haitian Vodou, as one of the world's most maligned and misunderstood religions. Its reputation is notorious; in broader Anglophone and Francophone society, it has been widely associated with sorcery, witchcraft, and black magic. In U.S. popular culture, for instance, Haitian Vodou is usually portrayed as destructive and malevolent, attitudes sometimes linked with anti-black racism. Non-practitioners have often depicted Vodou in literature, theater, and film; in many cases, such as the films White Zombie (1932) and London Voodoo (2004), these promote sensationalist views of the religion. The lack of any central Vodou authority has hindered efforts to combat these negative representations.

Two of the most pervasive representations are the creation of zombies and the use of voodoo dolls. In Haitian folklore, a zombie (Haitian French: zombi, Haitian Creole: zonbi) is an animated corpse raised by magical means, such as witchcraft. The concept has been popularly associated with the religion of voodoo, but it plays no part in that faith's formal practices. Filmmaker George A. Romero, who was influential in the development of the zombie film genre, initially believed that "zombies" corresponded to the undead slaves of Haitian voodoo as depicted in White Zombie. The term Voodoo doll commonly describes an effigy into which pins are inserted. Such practices are found in various forms in the magical traditions of many cultures around the world. Although the use of the term Voodoo implies that the practice is linked to Haitian Vodou or Louisiana Voodoo, the voodoo doll is not prominent in either. The link between this magical practice and Voodoo was established through the presentation of the latter in Western popular culture, enduring the first half of the 20th century. In this, the myth of this magical practice being closely linked to Voodoo and Vodou was promoted as part of the wider negative depictions of blacks and Afro-Caribbean religious practices in the United States. In John Houston Craige's 1933 book Black Bagdad: The Arabian Nights Adventures of a Marine Captain in Haiti, he described a Haitian prisoner sticking pins into an effigy to induce illness. Its use also appeared in film representations of Haitian Vodou such as Halperin's White Zombie, and Tourneur's I Walked with a Zombie. Voodoo dolls are also featured in the films Lisztomania and Indiana Jones and the Temple of Doom, though the latter is in connection with a fictionalized Indian Thuggee religion entirely unrelated to Voodoo.

By the early 21st century, the image of the voodoo doll had become particularly pervasive. It had become a novelty item available for purchase, with examples being provided in vending machines in British shopping centres, and an article on "How to Make a Voodoo Doll" being included on WikiHow. A voodoo doll had also been included in the 2009 animated Disney movie, The Princess and the Frog, as well as the 2011 live-action Disney movie Pirates of the Caribbean: On Stranger Tides.

== Closer representations ==
More accurate representations of Voodoo occur in connection with the popular culture of regions where Voodoo is actually practiced. Humanity's relationship with spirits known as lwa has been a recurring theme in Haitian art, and the Vodou pantheon was a major topic for the mid-20th century artists of the "Haitian Renaissance." Art collectors began to take an interest in Vodou ritual paraphernalia in the late 1950s, and by the 1970s an established market for this material had emerged, with some material being commodified for sale abroad. Exhibits of Vodou ritual material have been displayed abroad; the Fowler Museum's exhibit on "Sacred Arts of Haitian Vodou" for instance traveled the U.S. for three years in the 1990s. Vodou has appeared in Haitian literature, and has also influenced Haitian music, as with the rock band Boukman Eksperyans, while theatre troupes have performed simulated Vodou rituals for audiences outside Haiti. Documentaries focusing on Vodou have appeared—such as Maya Deren's 1985 film Divine Horsemen or Anne Lescot and Laurence Magloire's 2002 work Of Men and Gods—which have in turn encouraged some viewers to take a practical interest in the religion.

== Misconceptions ==
Modern day Voodoo is usually associated with Satanism and witchcraft. This is because of how voodoo is presented in media and pop culture. In pop culture, Voodoo is often portrayed as "black magic" and placing "hexes". Along with witchcraft, Vodou is commonly connected with harm and animal sacrifice, the main use for Vodou is healing. Haitian Vodou focuses on healing by attempting to expel evil spirits from within the body.

== See also ==
- Witchcraft
