= Ritual in Transfigured Time =

1946 American experimental short film

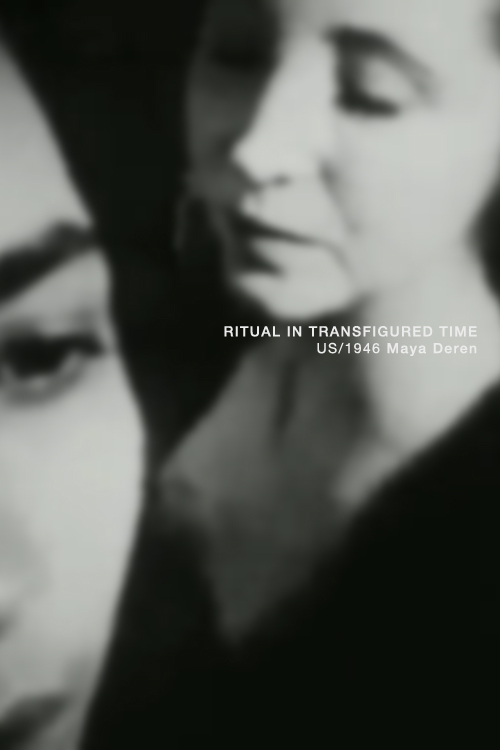
- Directed by: Maya Deren
- Written by: Maya Deren
- Produced by: Maya Deren
- Starring: Rita Christiani; Maya Deren; Anaïs Nin; Frank Westbrook; Gore Vidal
- Cinematography: Hella Hammid (as Hella Heyman)
- Edited by: Alexander Hammid; Maya Deren
- Release date: October 22, 1946
- Running time: 15 minutes
- Country: United States
- Language: no dialogue spoken

Ritual in Transfigured Time is a 1946 American experimental silent short film directed by Maya Deren. Like Deren's previous work, A Study in Choreography for Camera (1945), she explores the use of dance on film through the lens of commentary of societal norms, metamorphosis, and anthropomorphism. The film is notable for its disjointed storytelling and use of slow motion, freeze framing, and unique blend of stage dance and film.

Deren became known for her affinity for dance in other subsequent films such as Meditation on Violence, Ensemble for Somnambulists, and Divine Horsemen: The Living Gods of Haiti. Elinor Cleghorn writes: "While she never undertook formal training, she identified as a dancer; but rather than pursuing a career as a performer she made her fascination with dance as cultural expression the focus of her progression as a writer and researcher."

== Plot ==
Maya Deren's character sits in a room with string wrapped around her hands in a manner reminiscent of cat's cradle. Rita Christiani is drawn to Deren and begins winding the string into a ball. Close-up and slow motion highlight the intense feeling on Deren's face as she talks and moves her hands up and down, performing the first of the rituals in the film. Anaïs Nin looks upon the scene scornfully. Christiani finishes winding the string, Deren disappears, and Christiani walks through the doorway Nin is standing in.

Christiani is now wearing a black outfit with a veil and a cross necklace. A room full of people interact through expressive, dance-like movements. As they approach Christiani, she avoids them with graceful movements. Many shots and actions are repeated as she makes her way across the room. She looks around intently to find someone and spots Frank Westbrook. The two meet and he almost kisses her on the cheek.

Westbrook and Christiani dance together outdoors. He begins to dance with some other women and she leaves, looking back over her shoulder several times; one of these times, she is replaced by Deren. Christiani comes upon Westbrook posing atop a pedestal as a statue. She approaches, he moves, and she takes a step back. He moves again and she runs away. Westbrook slowly chases after her in long, leaping strides. He catches her. Deren runs underneath a pier into the ocean. She wades further and further into the water. The film switches to a negative image as she sinks down into the water. Christiani lifts the black mourning veil she was wearing at the party, but, since it is a negative image, it looks like a white bridal veil.

== Analysis ==
Speaking of her inspiration, Deren wrote: "A ritual is an action distinguished from all others in that it seeks the realization of its purpose through the exercise of form. In this sense ritual is art; and even historically, all art derives from ritual. In ritual, the form is the meaning. More specifically, the quality of movement is not merely a decorative factor; it is the meaning itself of the movement. In this sense, this film is dance."

Furthering Deren's theme on rituals, Moira Sullivan says ritual archetypes in the film are: "juxtaposed with images of modernity and frozen matter - freeze frames, statues, bodies – are ‘spiritualized’ through movement, similarly how symbolist poetry (one of Deren’s poetic influences) ‘spiritualized language’."

Deren's character in relation to Christiani's is almost mirror-like, leading film writer Bruce McPherson to write: "In Ritual in Transfigured Time, Maya appears as the protagonist’s counterpart, at once a double of Christiani and her familiar spirit, in a social choreography that moves towards the accomplishment of the protagonist’s ‘critical metamorphosis.’" This metamorphosis is further contextualized by writer William C. Wees, who says: "...references to water and dance accumulate and gain increasing significance as the film proceeds. Through them a theme of paired opposites becomes apparent. It is suggested by references to Deren's use of positive and negative images: the widow's black gown is transformed (in negative) into a white bridal dress at the end..."

The personal nature of Deren's work, like her other films, is present in Ritual, as it's said some of the themes throughout are direct links to her life, albeit shrouded in her characteristic muddled storytelling. "Deren’s oeuvre is personal to the extent of being almost autobiographical, clearly stemming from her experience of successive marriages and divorces. But she tried to comprehend and transcend that experience by setting it in a context not of resolution and closure, but of contradiction and assimilation (loss and gain, mourning and restitution, death and survival); the widow, drowned, is also a bride, alive, alone."
