= Cinema 16 =

Defunct American film society

Cinema 16 was a New York City–based film society founded by Amos Vogel. From 1947 to 1963, he and his wife, Marcia, ran the most successful and influential membership film society in North American history, at its height boasting 7000 members.

== History ==
Vogel was inspired by Maya Deren's independent exhibitions. Deren exhibited and presented lectures on her films across the United States, Cuba and Canada. In 1946, she booked the Provincetown Playhouse in Greenwich Village for a public exhibition titled Three Abandoned Films, which consisted of showings of Meshes of the Afternoon, At Land, and A Study in Choreography for the Camera. Deren took the word "abandoned" to refer to Paul Valéry's observation that a work of art is never completed, just abandoned. While the title was ironic, the exhibition was successful.

Cinema 16 closed in 1963, after 17 years in operation. In that year Amos went on to programme the New York Film Festival. Grove Press acquired Cinema 16 in 1966.

== Programming ==
The movies shown at Cinema 16 consisted mostly of the experimental film that began flourishing after World War II, as well as nonfiction films – not only documentaries, but educational films as well. In that, it differed even from the narrative-oriented art cinemas that appeared in the postwar years.

== Filmmakers exhibited ==
- Jonas Mekas
- Maya Deren
- Gregory Markopoulos
- Ron Peterson
- Carmen D'Avino (one of his films, the 1963 Oscar-nominated animated short Pianissimo, was distributed by Cinema 16)
- Stan Brakhage
- Shirley Clarke
- Bruce Conner
- Joseph Cornell
- Brian De Palma
- Georges Franju
- Richard Lester
- Nagisa Oshima
- Yasujiro Ozu
- Roman Polanski
- Alain Resnais
- Jacques Rivette
- Carlos Saura
- François Truffaut
- Agnès Varda
- John Cassavetes
