= Sara Kathryn Arledge =

American artist and filmmaker

- Born: September 28, 1911; Mojave, California, U.S.
- Died: January 6, 1998 (aged 86); Watsonville, California, U.S.
- Education: University of California, Los Angeles; Columbia University
- Known for: Experimental film
- Notable work: Introspection (1946)

Sara Kathryn Arledge (September 28, 1911 – January 6, 1998) was an American artist and filmmaker acknowledged as "one of the foremothers of the American experimental cinema."

== Early life and education ==
Born in Mojave, California, Arledge received a Bachelor of Education in Art from the University of California, Los Angeles in 1936. She also attended Columbia University and studied painting at The Barnes Foundation. She taught at the Department of Art at the University of Oklahoma from 1943 to 1944, and at the University of Arizona, Tucson from 1945 to 1946.

== Work ==
Her most recognized films were Introspection (1941–47) and What Is a Man? (1958). Introspection was the first abstract dance film made in the United States, and it pioneered the "cine-dance" genre (along with Maya Deren's A Study in Choreography for Camera, released in 1946).

Arledge also painted throughout her career and worked in the media of glass slide transparencies, which combined attributes of painting and filmmaking that interested her. According to film historian David E. James, "almost all the European avant-garde filmmakers of the 1920s were visual artists," and Arledge was one of the only Los Angeles visual artists to continue experimenting with the film medium after the 1920s. She also wrote about experimental film history; her essay "The Experimental Film: A New Art in Transition" was published in Arizona Quarterly 3, no. 2 (Summer 1947).

Arledge was noted for her glass slide transparencies created by layering pieces of multicolored stage-light gelatins and baking them on glass slides. The artist then draws on the surface of the gels with a variety of objects and seals the images by covering them with another set of glass slides. The fragile nature of this medium led her to make her "stabile color films" between 1978 and 1980 that integrated the slides and sound recordings in such works as Tender Images, Interior Garden I, Interior Garden II, and Iridium Sinus (Cave of the Rainbows).

== Legacy ==
Filmmaker Barbara Hammer described how Arledge "creates films that combine structural and painterly concerns guided by the emotions" and "represents for us the filmmaker as a whole person, as unified woman, as liver/artist". Her paintings were first exhibited posthumously in 2015 in the exhibition The Making of Personal Theory: Mysticism and Metaphysics in the Work of Sara Kathryn Arledge, Charles Irvin, and Jim Shaw, curated by Irene Tsatsos at the Armory Center for the Arts in Pasadena, California.

A retrospective of Arledge's works on paper, glasswork and short films was held at the Armory Center for the Arts in 2019, curated by Irene Tsatsos and entitled Sara Kathryn Arledge: Serene for the Moment. The retrospective was accompanied by an extended monograph on Arledge of the same name, the first of its kind, featuring previously unseen works on paper, hand-painted slides, and film stills.

== Books ==
- Sara Kathryn Arledge: Serene for the Moment (2020), retrospective edited by Irene Georgia Tsatsos with contributions by Sasha Archibald, Terry Cannon, Johanna Hedva, Nicole Kelly, Sarah McColl, Sara K. Smith (Sara Kathryn Arledge), and Irene Georgia Tsatsos (Pasadena, CA: Armory Center for the Arts). ISBN 978-1-893900-22-6

== Filmography ==
- Introspection (1941–47)
- A Selection of Glass Slide Transparencies (1947-1950)
- What Is a Man? (1958)
- Tender Images (1978)
- Interior Garden I (1978)
- Interior Garden II (1978)
- Iridium Sinus (Cave of the Rainbows)
