= Donald Mahler =

American dancer (1933–2022)

Donald Mahler (February 16, 1933 – January 25, 2022) was an American ballet dancer, choreographer and stage director. As a dancer and later choreographer, Mahler had a long career with the Metropolitan Opera in New York City from 1962 to 1986. In his later years, he was mainly active as a director of ballets, and is particularly known for his stagings of the works of Antony Tudor.

== Biography ==
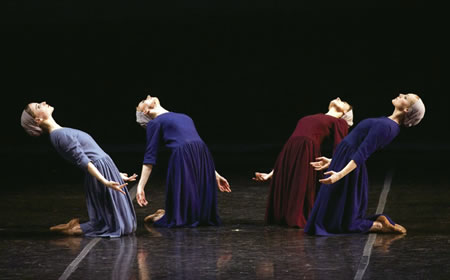
Boston Ballet dancers perform Antony Tudor's Dark Elegies (1937) under Mahler's direction in 2008

Mahler studied at the Metropolitan Opera Ballet School under Margaret Craske and Antony Tudor during the 1950s. While at the school he appeared in the 1958 film The Very Eye of Night, directed by Maya Deren. This short film features inverted images of dancers (with choreography by Tudor) moving across a starry sky. Shortly after finishing this project, Mahler joined the National Ballet of Canada where he danced for five years. While there he was a featured dancer in two ballets by Tudor, Lilac Garden and Offenbach in the Underworld.

In 1962, Mahler joined the Metropolitan Opera Ballet at the invitation of Alicia Markova, making his debut with the company at the "Old Met" on February 16, 1962 in a production of Giuseppe Verdi's Aida with Leonie Rysanek in the title role and Franco Corelli as Radamès. He remained at the Met up through the spring of 1975, and rejoined them for the 1979-1980 season. His final and 316th performance at the Met was as the Hairdresser in Richard Strauss's Der Rosenkavalier on January 12, 1980 with Agnes Baltsa as Octavian, Anna Tomowa-Sintow as the Marschallin, and Judith Blegen as Sophie. In addition to operas, Mahler performed in many ballets at the Met, including Tudor's Echoing of Trumpets and Concerning Oracles.

Although no longer dancing at the Met, Mahler continued to work for the company through 1986 as one of their main choreographers. He choreographed productions of Strauss's Salome (1981), Verdi's I Vespri Siciliani (1982), Verdi's La forza del destino (1982), Amilcare Ponchielli's La Gioconda (1982), Francesco Cilea's Adriana Lecouvreur (1983), and Richard Wagner's Die Meistersinger von Nürnberg (1985). The last opera he choreographed for the company was Riccardo Zandonai's Francesca da Rimini which gave its final performance on February 13, 1986 with Renata Scotto in the title role.

Since the early 1980s, Mahler has worked mainly as a stage director and choreographer for ballets, particularly focusing on staging the works of his teacher and mentor Antony Tudor. He has staged Tudor ballets for many companies, including the American Ballet Theatre, Ballet West, Ballet San Jose, Boston Ballet, the Edinburgh Festival, and the Joffrey Ballet.

He died in Roslyn Heights, New York, on January 25, 2022, at the age of 88.

== Videography ==
- The Metropolitan Opera Centennial Gala, Deutsche Grammophon DVD, 00440-073-4538, 2009
