= Meshes of the Afternoon =

1943 short film by Maya Deren and Alexandr Hackenschmied

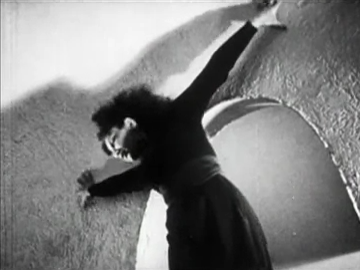
- Deren in Meshes of the Afternoon
- Directed by: Maya Deren; Alexandr Hackenschmied
- Written by: Maya Deren
- Produced by: Maya Deren
- Starring: Maya Deren; Alexandr Hackenschmied
- Cinematography: Alexandr Hackenschmied
- Edited by: Maya Deren
- Music by: Teiji Ito (Note: Added in 1959.)
- Release date: 1943
- Running time: 14 minutes
- Country: United States
- Language: Silent
- Budget: $275

Meshes of the Afternoon is a 1943 American silent experimental thriller short film directed by and starring married couple Maya Deren and Alexandr Hackenschmied. Deren also wrote, produced, and edited it, whilst Hackenschmied served as director of photography. In 1990, the film was selected for preservation in the United States National Film Registry by the Library of Congress for its cultural and historical significance. It is in the public domain in the United States due to being published without a copyright notice.

== Plot ==
Full film (without the 1959 musical accompaniment)

A woman (Maya Deren) notices someone on the street as she walks back to her home. She enters her room and falls asleep in a chair. As soon as she drifts off, she experiences a dream in which she repeatedly tries to chase a mysterious hooded figure with a mirror for a face but is unable to catch it. With each failed attempt, she re-enters her house and encounters numerous household objects, including a key, a bread knife, a flower, a telephone, and a phonograph. The woman follows the hooded figure to her bedroom, where she sees the figure hide the knife under a pillow. Throughout the film, she witnesses multiple versions of herself, each representing fragments of the dream she has already experienced.

In one instance, the woman attempts to kill her sleeping body with the knife but is abruptly awakened by a man (Alexandr Hackenschmied). The man leads her to the bedroom, and she realizes that everything she saw in the dream was actually happening. She notices that the man's posture resembles that of the hooded figure when it hid the knife under the pillow. She tries to injure him but fails.

Towards the end of the film, the man walks into the house and sees a broken mirror being dropped onto wet ground. He then finds the woman in the chair, who was previously asleep but is now dead.

The film's narrative is circular, repeating several motifs: a flower on a long driveway, a falling key, an unlocked door, a knife in a loaf of bread, a mysterious Grim Reaper–like cloaked figure with a mirror for a face, a phone off the hook, and an ocean. Through creative editing, distinct camera angles, and slow motion, the surrealist film portrays a world in which it becomes increasingly difficult to distinguish reality from illusion.

== Background and production ==
The film was the product of Deren and Hackenschmied's desire to create an avant-garde personal film that dealt with complex psychology, like the surrealist films Un Chien Andalou (1929) and L'Age d'Or (1930) by Salvador Dalí and Luis Buñuel.

Deren and Hackenschmied, who changed his name to Alexander Hammid in 1942, wrote, directed, and performed in the film. Although Deren is usually credited as its principal artistic creator, filmmaker Stan Brakhage, who knew the couple, has claimed in his book Film at Wit's End that Meshes was in fact largely Hammid's creation and that their marriage began to suffer when Deren received more credit. Other sources claim that Hammid's role in the creation of Meshes of the Afternoon is mainly as cameraperson. Deren made extensive storyboards for all of her films, including camera movements and camera effects. She wrote about these techniques in professional filmmaking magazines. The ideas and execution of the film are mostly attributable to Deren. Hammid also acknowledged Deren as the sole creator of Meshes of the Afternoon.

The original print had no score. However, a musical score influenced by classical Japanese music was added in 1959 by Deren's third husband, Teiji Ito.

In 1990, Meshes of the Afternoon was selected for preservation in the United States National Film Registry by the Library of Congress as being "culturally, historically, or aesthetically significant", going into the registry in the second year of voting. In 2015 the BBC named the film the 40th greatest American movie ever made. In 2022, it was voted the 16th greatest film of all time in the Sight & Sound poll.

== Analysis ==
In the early 1970s, J. Hoberman claimed that Meshes of the Afternoon was "less related to European surrealism" and more related to "Hollywood wartime film noir".

Deren explained that Meshes "...is concerned with the interior experiences of an individual. It does not record an event which could be witnessed by other persons. Rather, it reproduces the way in which the subconscious of an individual will develop, interpret and elaborate an apparently simple and casual incident into a critical emotional experience."

=== Lewis Jacobs's discussion ===
Writing about Meshes of the Afternoon, Lewis Jacobs credits Maya Deren with being the first film maker since the end of World War II to "inject a fresh note into experimental film production".

Further in his discussion of experimental cinema in postwar America, Jacobs says the film "attempted to show the way in which an apparently simple and casual occurrence develops subconsciously into a critical and emotional experience. A girl comes home one afternoon and falls asleep. In a dream she sees herself returning home, tortured by loneliness and frustration and impulsively committing suicide. The story has a double climax, in which it appears that the imagined, the dream, has become real.”

Deren uses specific cinematic devices in this film to convey deeper meaning. In a particular scene, Deren is walking up a normal set of stairs, and each time she pushes against the wall, it triggers the camera to move in that direction, almost as if the camera is part of her body. As she pulls herself up the last stair, the top of the stairs leads her to a window in her bedroom, which breaks the expectations of the viewer. In doing so, Deren destroys the normal sense of time and space. There is no longer a sense of what space she is in, nor for how long it was there. Deren constantly asks the viewer to pay attention and remember certain things by repeating the same actions over and over with only very subtle changes.

A recognizable trait of Deren's work is her use of the subjective and objective camera. For instance, shots in Meshes of the Afternoon cut from Deren looking at an object, to Deren's point of view, looking at herself perform the same actions that she has been making throughout the film. This conveys the meaning of Deren's dual personality or ambivalent feelings towards the possibility of suicide. It is Lewis Jacobs's opinion that "the film is not completely successful, it skips from objectivity to subjectivity without transitions or preparation and is often confusing." An example of Jacobs's comment would be when Deren cuts to her point of view, which normally is an objective shot, but in this POV shot she is watching herself, which is subjective. The viewer cannot expect Deren's POV shot to contain herself.

=== Joseph Brinton's discussion ===
In Joseph Brinton's 1947 essay "Subjective Camera or Subjective Audience", he states that "the symbolic picturization of man’s subconscious in Maya Deren’s experimental films suggests that the subjective camera can explore subtleties hitherto unimaginable as film content. As the new technique can clearly express almost any facet of everyday human experience, its development should presage a new type of psychological film in which the camera will reveal the human mind, not superficially, but honestly in terms of image and sound."

Jacobs' critique that "the film is not completely successful, it skips from objectivity to subjectivity without transitions or preparation and is often confusing", represents one point of view. However, others take the film's approach to be a direct representation on the character's thought patterns in a time of crisis: "Such a film should indeed endow the cinema with a wholly new dimension of subjective experience, permitting the audience to see a human being both as others see him and as he sees himself."

=== Museum of Modern Art ===
In the Museum of Modern Art retrospective (2010), it was suggested that the pieces of the mirror falling into the ocean waves set up At Land (1944) as a direct sequel, while Deren's last scene in the latter film (running with her hands up with a chess piece in one of them) is then echoed by a scene in Ritual in Transfigured Time (1946) with that character still running.

== Possible influences ==
=== Jean Cocteau ===
Meshes of the Afternoon resembles Jean Cocteau's 1930 film Blood of a Poet in its representation of a subjective point of view. Meshes of the Afternoon and Cocteau's film also share the same imagery in many instances; however, Deren repeatedly claimed to have never seen the film and denied any influence by Cocteau.

In the fall of 1945, Deren wrote to Victor Animatograph Corp. that she had now seen Cocteau's film multiple times and expressed interest in publishing a commentary on it. The proposed article was never written.

=== Salvador Dali and Luis Buñuel ===
The work of Salvador Dalí and Luis Buñuel has been suggested by some critics as a possible influence. Deren reportedly detested this comparison because of the surrealist movement's interest in the entertainment value of its subject more than its meaning.

=== Sigmund Freud and Carl Jung ===
Viewers have attempted to decode the symbolism in the film from a Freudian or Jungian point of view to uncover possible messages about identity and sexuality. Deren adamantly objected to those who saw her film as symbolic; for her, the objects in the film were just that, objects "whose value and meaning is defined and confirmed by their actual function in the context of the film as a whole". Deren wanted her audiences to appreciate the art for its conscious value and spent much of her later career delivering lectures and writing essays on her film theory.

== Reception and Legacy ==
Meshes of the Afternoon won the Grand Prix International for avant-garde film at the 1947 Cannes Film Festival.

A cloaked, mirror-faced figure appears in John Coney's 1974 Sun Ra vehicle Space Is the Place.

The dreamlike (or nightmarish) atmosphere of Meshes has influenced many subsequent films, notably David Lynch's Lost Highway (1997). Wendy Haslem of the University of Melbourne's Cinema Studies department wrote about the parallels between the two:

Maya Deren was a key figure in the development of the New American Cinema. Her influence extends to contemporary filmmakers like David Lynch, whose film Lost Highway (1997) pays homage to Meshes of the Afternoon in his experimentation with narration. Lynch adopts a similar spiraling narrative pattern, sets his film within an analogous location and establishes a mood of dread and paranoia, the result of constant surveillance. Both films focus on the nightmare as it is expressed in the elusive doubling of characters and in the incorporation of the “psychogenic fugue,” the evacuation and replacement of identities, something that was also central to the voodoo ritual.

Jim Emerson, the editor of RogerEbert.com, has also noted the influence of Meshes within David Lynch's film Inland Empire (2006). However, Lynch denied he ever saw the film or even heard of Deren.

In 2010, the Museum of Modern Art (MoMA) opened an exhibition that dealt with Deren's influence on three experimental filmmakers, Barbara Hammer, Su Friedrich and Carolee Schneemann, as part of a year-long retrospective there on representation of women. Su Friedrich conceived her short film Cool Hands, Warm Heart (1979) in direct homage to Meshes of the Afternoon, and used the flower and knife motifs similarly in that film.

Kristin Hersh's song "Your Ghost" is inspired by the film, and the song's music video uses several motifs from the film, including a spinning record, a telephone, and a key on a woman's tongue. Likewise, Milla Jovovich's video for "Gentleman Who Fell" reproduces other motifs such as the mirror-faced figure, the reappearing key, the knife, and the shifting staircase effect.

Industrial metal pioneers Godflesh used a still from the film for the cover of their 1994 EP Merciless, as did alternative rock band Primal Scream for their 1986 single "Crystal Crescent".

Experimental electronic artist Sd Laika used samples from the film's soundtrack for the track "Meshes" on his debut album.
