= Subterraneans (band) =

English rock band

- Origin: London, UK
- Genres: Alternative rock, avant-garde, psychedelic rock, post-punk, shoegaze
- Years active: 1992–present
- Labels: Electric, Cadiz, Radar Music/MotionFX GmbH, Rhythm of Life, BMP, Osceola
- Members: Jude Rawlins; Carl Homer; Robin Phillips; Guy Evans

Subterraneans are an art-rock band from London, England. Fronted by former Angelhead vocalist and songwriter Jude Rawlins, they also feature former Wave guitarist Carl Homer, former Solstice bass player Robin Phillips, and Van der Graaf Generator drummer Guy Evans.

== Film, theatre and television ==
Subterraneans have recorded soundtracks for several films, including the official 70th anniversary soundtrack to G.W. Pabst's celebrated movie Pandora's Box, starring Louise Brooks, and Maya Deren's At Land.

Their music has also featured in shows by performance artist Judy Neville (whose voice can also be heard on Subterraneans' track "Fall Out"), and poet Suzanne Andrade, whose 2006 Edinburgh Festival show Invisible Ink included excerpts from the band's Pandora's Box soundtrack.

The band is named after the closing track on David Bowie's Low album and were given their name by Billy Mackenzie.

== Discography ==
=== Studio albums ===
- April May June (1993)
- Mona Lisa (1998)
- Soul Mass Transit (2006)
- Eights and Rhymes (2008)
- This Too Shall Pass (2011)
- Goodbye Voyager (2017)

=== Extended plays ===
- Slide EP (1995)

=== Soundtrack albums ===
- Pandora's Box (2001)
- Themes for Maya Deren (2004)

=== Live albums ===
- Live in Berlin (2008)

=== Compilation albums ===
- Orly Flight (2003)
- Underground: The Singles 1992-2011 (2012)

=== Singles ===
- "Dream Fades into Dark" (1992)
- "No" featuring Billy Mackenzie (1996)
- "She Walks on Water" (1997)
- "Hazel Eyes" (1998)
- "The Last Time" featuring Angie Bowie (2002)
- "Canticle in D" (2006)
- "Love X Plus Y" (2006)
- "I'm for You" (2010)
- "A Lot Like Love" (2011)

== Sources ==
- Rawlins, Jude (2004). Cul, de Sac: Lyrics, Prose and Poems 1987-2004 (3rd ed.). Hampstead House Press. ISBN 1-4116-0895-X.
- Clark, Lisa (11 February 2005). The Lives of Jude Rawlins. Artsweek.
