= Arlene Sierra =

American composer

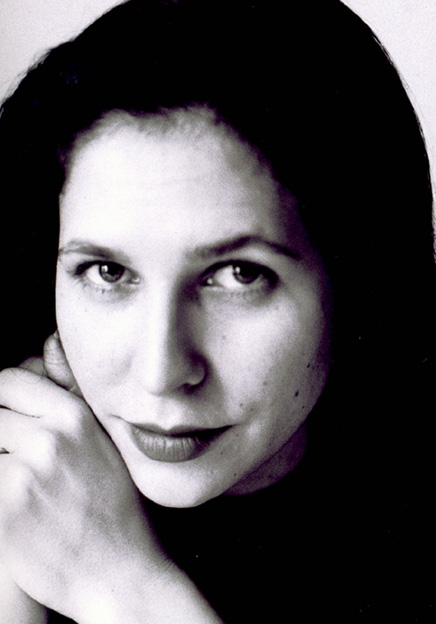

Background information
- Born: Arlene Elizabeth Sierra; June 1, 1970 (age 56); Miami, Florida, U.S.
- Origin: New York City, New York, U.S.
- Genres: Contemporary classical
- Occupation: Composer
- Instruments: Piano
- Years active: 1997–present
- Label: Bridge Records
- Website: arlenesierra.com

Arlene Sierra (b. June 1, 1970) is an American composer of contemporary classical music, working in London, United Kingdom.

== Education ==
Sierra studied at Oberlin College Conservatory of Music, Yale University School of Music and the University of Michigan, Ann Arbor, receiving a DMA in 1999; her principal teachers were Martin Bresnick, Michael Daugherty and Jacob Druckman. A composition fellow at the Britten-Pears School (Aldeburgh Festival) in 2000 and Tanglewood in 2001, teachers included Louis Andriessen, Magnus Lindberg, and Colin Matthews. She also worked with Judith Weir at the Dartington International Summer School in 1999, Paul-Heinz Dittrich in Berlin in 1997-8, and Betsy Jolas at The American Conservatory of Fontainebleau Schools in 1993.

== Career ==
Sierra's music has been commissioned by organizations including the Seattle Symphony, Tanglewood Music Festival, the New York Philharmonic, the Huddersfield Contemporary Music Festival, the Albany Symphony, the Detroit Symphony, the Cheltenham International Festival, the Jerome, PRS and Cheswatyr Foundations, and the Ralph Vaughan Williams Trust. Performers of her work have included New York City Opera VOX, the London Sinfonietta, International Contemporary Ensemble, the Boston Symphony, the BBC National Orchestra of Wales, and the Tokyo Philharmonic.

In 2001, she was the first woman to win the Takemitsu Prize; in 2007 she received a Charles Ives Fellowship from the American Academy of Arts and Letters with a citation for music, "by turns, urgent, poetic, evocative and witty." In 2011, a debut CD of chamber music was released by Bridge Records: Arlene Sierra, Volume 1, and she was named Composer of the Year by the Classical Recording Foundation. A second CD, Game of Attrition: Arlene Sierra, Vol. 2, was released in 2014 including four orchestral works recorded by the BBC National Orchestra of Wales, Jac Van Steen, conductor. In the same year, Moler, an orchestral work commissioned by the Seattle Symphony, was nominated for a Latin Grammy Award. Sierra's third release on the Bridge label, Butterflies Remember a Mountain: Arlene Sierra, Vol. 3, a chamber disc including performances by Nicola Benedetti, Leonard Elschenbroich, the Horszowski Trio, and Quattro Mani was released in 2018. Sierra was Composer-in-Association with the Utah Symphony for the 2020-21 season.The latest and fourth volume in the Bridge Records series of Sierra portraits, Birds and Insects: Arlene Sierra, Vol. 4, was released in 2025. The album is arranged into three books, comprising 15 movements composed across a twenty-year period performed by pianists Steven Beck (Books 1 and 2) and Sarah Cahill (Book 3).

Sierra was a Composition Tutor at Cambridge University in 2003-4 before joining Cardiff University School of Music in 2004, where she is Professor of Composition.

Her music is published by Cecilian Music (ASCAP).

== Musical style ==
Sierra's compositions are rooted in early training in classical piano and in electronic music at the Oberlin Conservatory of Music.

Sierra's earlier works have their origins in military strategy and game theory, with literary sources including Vitruvius and Sun Tzu, notably: Ballistae (2000) for large ensemble and Surrounded Ground (2008) for sextet, as well as Art of War (2010), a concerto for piano and orchestra.

Many of Sierra's works are inspired by bird song, insect calls, and sounds and processes from the natural world, including Butterflies Remember a Mountain (2013), a piano trio which was inspired by a peculiar detour in the annual mass migration of monarch butterflies. This trio was the starting point for Nature Symphony (2017) commissioned by the BBC Philharmonic and BBC Radio 3. Other works that employ natural sounds and processes include Cicada Shell (2006) for ensemble, Birds and Insects, Books 1, 2, and 3 (2007, 2018, 2023) for piano solo, Insects in Amber (2010) for string quartet, and Urban Birds (2014) for three pianos with percussion and electronics.

These two interests – nature and military strategy – are both evident in her 2009 orchestral work Game of Attrition which takes its structure from processes described by Charles Darwin in The Origin of Species. Larger-scale works along these lines followed, including Nature Symphony and the 2022 work Bird Symphony, a commission from the Utah Symphony, which creates a large-scale four-movement structure using transcriptions of bird song. Kiskadee, an orchestral work from 2023 commissioned by the Detroit Symphony, features the calls of two birds that compete for territory in nature, taking this interaction as a source for the structure of the work.

Sierra has demonstrated an interest in dramatic and stage works centered on women protagonists, in scenarios ranging from Faust in the opera Faustine to human trafficking in the collaborative chamber opera Cuatro Corridos. Since 2012, she has been working on a series of original scores to films by Maya Deren for a variety of chamber ensembles, including Meditation on Violence and Ritual in Transfigured Time. Sierra's music was the focus of performances by Vencl Dance at the Martha Graham Center of Contemporary Dance in New York City in 2016.

== See also ==
- List of compositions by Arlene Sierra
