= The Witch's Cradle =

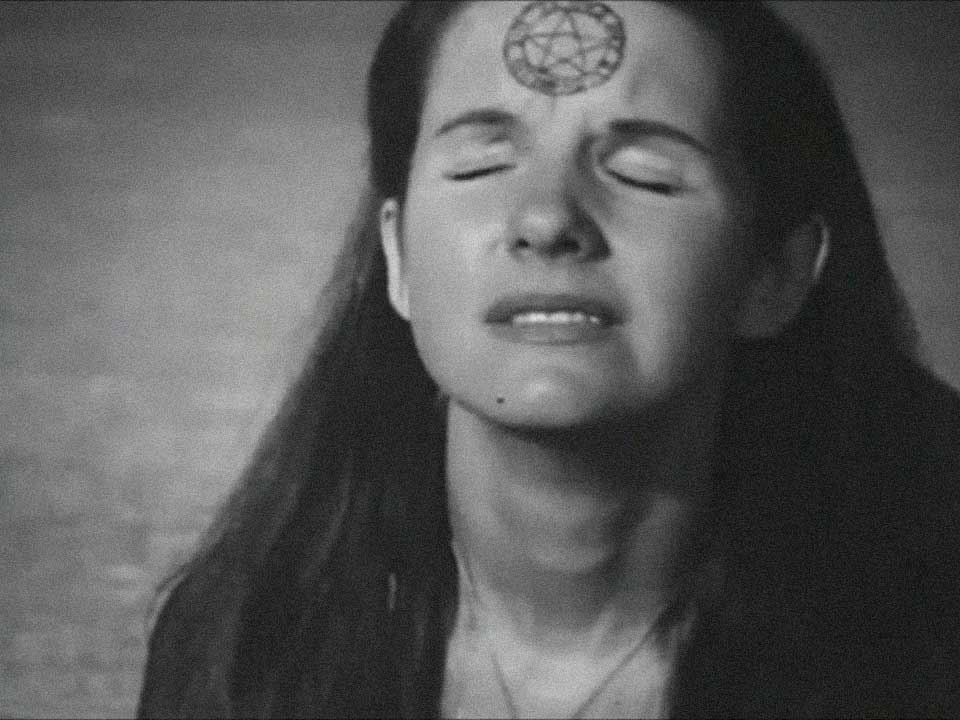
- Pajorita Matta in the film The Witch's Cradle
- Directed by: Maya Deren
- Written by: Maya Deren
- Screenplay by: Maya Deren
- Starring: Marcel Duchamp; Pajorita Matta
- Release date: 1944
- Running time: 12 minutes
- Country: United States

The Witch's Cradle (1944), sometimes billed as Witches' Cradle, is an unfinished, silent, experimental short film written and directed by Maya Deren, featuring Marcel Duchamp, and filmed in Peggy Guggenheim's Art of This Century gallery.

== Plot ==
The surrealist film shows repetitive imagery involving a string fashioned in a bizarre, almost spiderweb-like pattern over the hands of several individuals, most notably an unnamed young woman (Pajorita Marta) and an elderly gentleman (Duchamp).

The film also shows a shadowy darkness and people filmed at odd angles, an exposed human heart, and other occult symbols and ritualistic imagery which evokes an unsettling and dream-like aura.

== Cast ==
- Marcel Duchamp as The artist (uncredited)
- Pajorita Marta as The girl (uncredited)

== Production ==
The Witch's Cradle was written and directed by experimental filmmaker Maya Deren. The film was developed at a comparison between surrealists' defiance of time and space and that of medieval magicians and witches. Deren developed the film over a period of one month, lasting from August to September 1943. However, long after principal photography for the film commenced, she abandoned the project, leaving the film incomplete. Some of the film's outtakes were found and stored at the Anthology Film Archives, while several sequences that were shot appear to be lost. Surviving shots from the film are mostly semi-edited sequences, including one particular sequence that Deren had engineered during post-production to be played backwards.

== See also ==
- Experimental film
- Lost film

== Bibliography ==
- Keller, Sarah (December 9, 2014). Maya Deren: Incomplete Control. Columbia University Press. ISBN 978-0-231-53847-3.
- Sicherman, Barbara; Green, Carol Hurd (1980). Notable American Women: The Modern Period : a Biographical Dictionary. Harvard University Press. p. 187. ISBN 978-0-674-62733-8.
- Waldman, Harry (1991). Scenes Unseen: Unreleased and Uncompleted Films from the World's Master Filmmakers, 1912-1990. McFarland. ISBN 978-0-89950-601-2.
