= Hella Hammid =

American photographer (1921–1992)

- Born: Hella Hilde Heyman; July 15, 1921; Kronberg im Taunus, Germany
- Died: May 1, 1992 (aged 70); Los Angeles, California, US
- Other names: Hella Hamon; Hella Hammid
- Education: St Paul's School, London; Barnard College; Black Mountain College
- Occupations: Photographer; cinematographer; actor
- Spouse: Alexander Hammid (m. 1948)
- Children: 2
- Mother: Lette Valeska

Hella Heyman Hammid (born Hella Hilde Heyman; July 15, 1921 – May 1, 1992) was a German-born American photographer and cinematographer. She was known for her collaborations with filmmaker Maya Deren on the films At Land and Ritual in Transfigured Time. Her photographic work appeared in magazines and publications and included portraits of children and families, with one of her images being selected for the Museum of Modern Art's 1955 world‑touring exhibition The Family of Man. In the 1970s, she took part in research into remote viewing and related subjects, collaborating with researchers.

== Early life and education ==
Hella Hilde Heyman was born on July 15, 1921, in Kronberg im Taunus, Germany, to pharmaceutical entrepreneur Ernst Heyman and artist Valeska Heinemann (known as Lette Valeska). The family lived in Frankfurt until 1932, when they relocated to Paris after her father's chemical plant was seized by the Nazis. They subsequently moved to New York City and later to Los Angeles at the request of Valeska's friend Galka Scheyer. While the family was in London she attended St Paul's School, and she later studied at Barnard College. Through her relationship with Scheyer, she was introduced to Josef Albers and received a reference for her application to Black Mountain College, where she was accepted. However, she left in December 1940 due to financial difficulties and was unable to complete her studies.

== Career ==
=== Cinematography ===
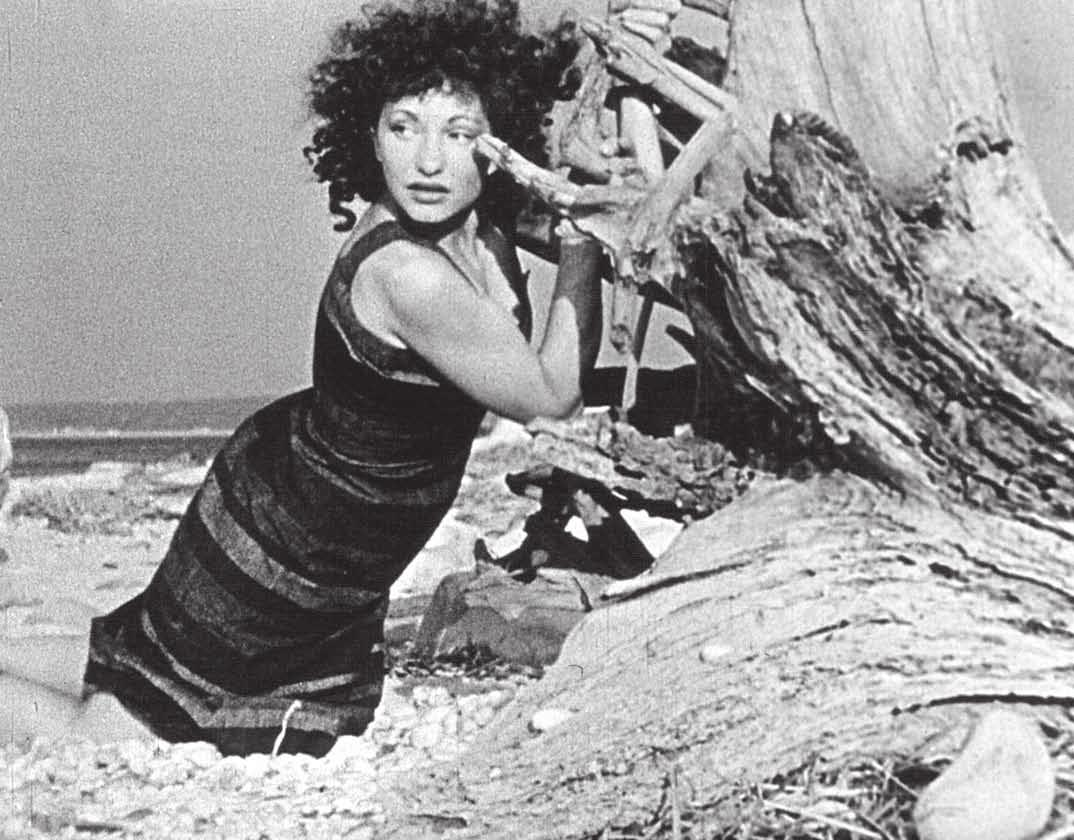
Maya Deren in At Land. Hammid (as Hella Heyman) collaborated with Alexander Hammid for cinematography.

After leaving Black Mountain College, she returned to New York City and worked as a freelance photographer and writer, meeting director Maya Deren along the way. In the summer of 1944, Deren invited Heyman to serve as camerawoman on her film At Land, since Deren's husband, Alexander Hammid, was mostly occupied with work at the Office of War Information. Willing to operate the camera while Deren directed, she participated in a six-month shoot that was frequently difficult, with much of the filming taking place among the rocks, beaches, and dunes of Long Island. As Hammid also served as a cinematographer on the film, the three collaborated on the production and appeared on screen. Heyman later collaborated with Deren on additional projects, including Ritual in Transfigured Time in 1946.

=== Photography ===
Her freelance photographs appeared in publications such as Life, Ebony, The Sun, and The New York Times. After her marriage to Alexander Hammid, she pursued a professional career producing candid portraits of children and families for private clients, including Anaïs Nin and Benjamin Spock, as well as contributing to numerous book projects. In 1955, one of her photographs was selected for the Museum of Modern Art's world‑touring exhibition The Family of Man by Edward Steichen.

In the 1970s she collaborated with Russell Targ and Harold E. Puthoff at SRI International on research into remote viewing, work that was connected to projects funded by the Central Intelligence Agency. In 1976, Hammid photographed her close friend Deena Metzger, who had undergone a mastectomy for breast cancer. The image was adapted into a feminist poster that presented a positive portrayal of the post‑operative body and was widely circulated in 1977. She also collaborated with Stephan A. Schwartz on The Alexandria Project, a program of "psychic archaeology," and participated in the Gateway Voyage program developed by Robert Monroe of the Monroe Institute, which was held at the Esalen Institute in Big Sur in 1973.

== Personal life ==
In 1948, she married Alexander Hammid, who had previously been married to Maya Deren and had divorced. The two had two children: Julia and Tino. Tino Martin Hammid became a gem photographer until his death in 2015. Hella Hammid also taught at University of California, Los Angeles as a professor. She died on May 1, 1992, in Los Angeles from breast cancer.

== Filmography ==
Year	Title	Role	Notes	Ref.
1944	At Land	Cinematographer, actor	In collaboration with director Maya Deren and cinematographer Alexander Hammid.	
1946	Ritual in Transfigured Time	Cinematographer	In collaboration with director Maya Deren and cinematographer Alexander Hammid.	
1987	Invocation: Maya Deren	Herself		
