= Chao-Li Chi =

Chinese-born American actor and dancer (1927–2010)

- Born: April 5, 1927; Taiyuan, Shanxi Province, China
- Died: October 16, 2010 (aged 83); Granada Hills, California, U.S.
- Occupation: Actor
- Years active: 1948, 1964–2008
- Relatives: Ji Chaoding (brother); Ji Chaozhu (brother)

Chao-Li Chi (Chinese: 冀朝理; pinyin: Jì Cháolǐ; April 5, 1927 – October 16, 2010) was a Chinese-American actor and dancer who worked extensively in American television, including his best known role as Chao-Li, the faithful majordomo and chauffeur of Jane Wyman's character in Falcon Crest. His film credits include Big Trouble in Little China, The Joy Luck Club, The Nutty Professor, Wedding Crashers and The Prestige. He was featured in the short film by Maya Deren Meditation on Violence, in 1948.

Chi was a member of a prominent and influential Shanxi political dynasty. His brothers included the economist Ji Chaoding, and diplomat and UN Under-Secretary General Ji Chaozhu.

== Early life and education ==
Chi was born in Shanxi, China, on April 5, 1927. Both his father and grandfather were prominent in local politics. His older brother, Ji Chaoding, was an economist and left-wing political activist. His younger brother Ji Chaozhu was a translator, diplomat, and later Under-Secretary General of the United Nations.

In 1939, when Chi was 11-years old, he and his elder brother Chaoding left China as refugees from the Japanese invasion of China. They settled in New York City, where Chaoding was attending Columbia University and would later work as a trade representative for the Nationalist government. Chi obtained a bachelor's degree from St. John's College, in Annapolis, Maryland. Chi also earned a master's degree from New York University and a second master's degree from The New School, which was known as the New School for Social Research at the time.

== Career ==
Chi began studying acting, dance, and performance art at Pearl S. Buck’s East and West Association. He appeared as the lead performer in Maya Deren's 1948 film, Meditation on Violence, in which he performs a Wudangquan routine. He continued to perform with Deren dance companies into the 1960s. In 1967, Chi became the Dance Director of the Living Arts Program in Dayton, Ohio, while touring with Deren.

Chi appeared in approximately fifty-one film and television roles during the course of his career. On television, Chi was perhaps best known for his role as Chao-Li in the 1980s soap opera Falcon Crest which aired for nine years on CBS. His other television credits included parts on M*A*S*H and Pushing Daisies. Chi's film credits included The Joy Luck Club, Big Trouble in Little China, The Prestige and Wedding Crashers. His theater credits included the travelling production of Flower Drum Song and the short lived musical Barbary Coast.

== Personal life ==
Chi moved to Los Angeles in 1975. A practicing Taoist, Chi co-founded the Taoist Sanctuary, later renamed the Taoist Institute, in Hollywood. He taught courses in the Tao Te Ching, I Ching, philosophy and tai chi at California State University, Los Angeles and the Lee Strasberg Theatre and Film Institute. He also taught tai chi at the Pacific Asia Museum in Pasadena, California, on Saturdays for more than thirty years.

== Death ==
Chi died in his home in Granada Hills, California, on October 16, 2010, at the age of 83. He was survived by his wife, daughter and stepson.

== Filmography ==
Year	Title	Role	Notes
1948	Meditation on Violence	Himself	Short
1964	Open the Door and See All the People	Wei No. 3	
1980	The Big Brawl	Kwan	
1980	First Family	Chinese Ambassador	
1981	Eyewitness	Mr. Long	
1981	Falcon Crest	Chao-Li	TV Series (9 Seasons)
1986	Big Trouble in Little China	Uncle Chu	
1992	Batman: The Animated Series	Yoru Sensei	Episode "Night of the Ninja" (voice)
1993	Eye of the Stranger	Mr. Lee	
1993	Dragon: The Bruce Lee Story	Elder	
1993	The Joy Luck Club	June's Father	
1996	The Nutty Professor	Asian Man	
1997	Still Breathing	Formosa Bartender	
1997	Warriors of Virtue	Master Chung	
2000	What's Cooking?	Grandpa Nguyen	
2000	Now Chinatown	Mr. Quong	
2001	Extreme Days	Grandpa G	
2002	The Master of Disguise	Mongolian	
2002	Blood Work	Mr. Kang	
2005	Wedding Crashers	Old Chinese Man	
2006	American Dreamz	Chinese Premiere	
2006	The Prestige	Chung Ling Soo	
