= Lette Valeska =

German painter (1885–1985)

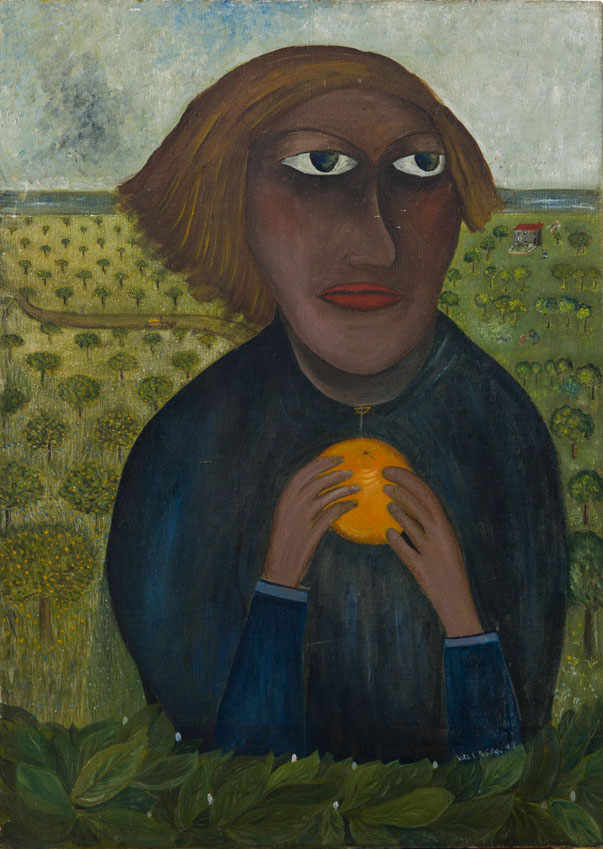
- The Promised Land self-portrait by Lette Valeska, date unknown.
- Born: Valeska Heinemann; August 20, 1885; Braunschweig, Germany
- Died: 8 January 1985 (aged 99)
- Occupation: Artist
- Spouse: Ernst Heyman (m. 1920; sep. 1938)
- Children: Hella Hammid

Valeska Heinemann (August 20, 1885 – January 8, 1985), known professionally as Lette Valeska, was a German-born American photographer, painter and sculptor in the Hollywood community. When her husband's chemical plant was confiscated by the Nazi regime, she left her homeland of Germany and traveled with her husband and daughter before moving to New York City in 1937. In 1938 she left her husband and moved to Los Angeles, where she spent the rest of her life. She began a photographic career of children's portraits and quickly gained notoriety among Hollywood stars. She worked as an archivist for the Pasadena Art Museum's Blue Four Collection. At the end of World War II, she organized a friendship correspondence between children in California and Ryswyck, Holland out of gratitude for Ryswyck citizens' assistance to holocaust refugees. At age 50, Valeska began painting and at age 70 began sculpting. She was featured in the Emmy award winning NBC documentary "The Heart Is Not Wrinkled" in 1969.

Valeska's photographs were always taken at her subjects' homes rather than a studio, a method she used to capture real people alive in their own environments. Never having been formally trained as an artist, her artwork expresses her soul rather than technical proficiency. Valeska and Galka Scheyer are credited with introducing German Expressionism to the Southern California art scene through her work with the Blue Four.

== Personal life ==
Lette Valeska was born Valeska Heinemann in Braunschweig, Germany, to Berthold and Fanny Heynemann (née Kunstmann) on August 20, 1885. She had two older brothers (Walter and Ludwig Heinemann, born in 1883 and 1882, respectively) and one younger brother (Fritz Heinemann, born in 1893).

She and her family were relatively assimilated Jews, but Valeska had little interest in Judaism in her youth. She attended a girls school in Braunschweig from 1891 to 1901, after which she studied English, French and Italian language and literature for eight years with private tutors. She began experimenting with photography at age 12 and carried a camera everywhere she went.

From 1911 to 1914 she worked as a German language secretary for an engineering magazine in Brussels, Belgium. In 1918, her younger brother Fritz died from the Spanish Flu while serving in World War I. In 1920, she married Ernst Heyman, who owned a chemical factory in Frankfurt. The couple had a daughter, Hella, in 1921. The family lived in Frankfurt until 1932, when she and Hella emigrated to Paris. Ernst had moved there a year earlier to open a new branch of the chemical factory. The Nazis confiscated the chemical factory in Frankfurt a year later, in 1933. In 1937 Valeska, Ernst and Hella emigrated to New York. A year later, Valeska and Ernst separated and Valeska moved to Los Angeles at the request of her childhood friend, Galka Scheyer. Ernst died by suicide in 1948.

By the end of World War II, none of Valeska's family remained in Germany. Her father had died in 1930 in Braunschweig. Her eldest brother Ludwig had emigrated with his wife, Emilie Salfeld, and Emilie's children from a previous marriage, to Gouda in the 1930s. Her mother, Fanny, joined Ludwig's family after Kristallnacht. Ludwig, Emilie, and Fanny were all killed in a bombing of their Gouda home. Valeska's last surviving sibling, Walter, who had been heavily involved in Braunschweig's Jewish community, emigrated to the United States in 1936 and lived in New York until his death in 1968.

== Photographic career ==
Shortly after Valeska arrived in Los Angeles, she secured permission to photograph children at UCLA's elementary school for education purposes. She created her own exhibit for parents and teachers in 1939, and later her photographs were used to illustrate the school's nursery and kindergarten education program to educators throughout California.

Valeska's photographs of schoolchildren captured the attention of Los Angeles. Mrs. David Selznick asked Valeska to photograph a day in her children's lives, and her husband was so impressed that he commissioned her to photograph Hollywood stars. This launched her into a career of photographing celebrities and their families at home, including Elizabeth Taylor, Gregory Peck, Mickey Rooney, Rita Hayworth, Jennifer Jones, James Stewart, Rhonda Fleming, Joseph Cotten, Natalie Wood and Margaret O'Brien. Valeska led several other photography projects. In 1942, the California Department of Education assigned Valeska to photograph a typical day in a one-room rural school for member nations of the Inter-American educational conference. In 1951, the Council of Jewish Federations of Greater Los Angeles requested that she photograph Israel's destitute for refugee relief fundraisers.

In December 1941, Valeska's photographic career was interrupted when the US government confiscated her cameras because she was not a US citizen. The principal of UCLA's elementary school and other individuals familiar with Valeska's work wrote letters to the attorney general vouching for her support of the US government and requesting the return of her cameras. The cameras were returned shortly, but with restrictions upon their use.

In November 1945, at the end of World War II, Valeska established a friendship campaign between the children of Los Angeles and Ryswyk, Holland, a town whose residents protected her friends and other Jews from the Holocaust. She contacted the mayor of Ryswyk and received the names and addresses of the city's children. The campaign started at the UCLA elementary school, whose students "adopted" children in Ryswyk and sent them letters, clothes and food. Soon children throughout Los Angeles were encouraged to participate in the campaign, and over 2,000 children in Ryswyk received packages. Other American cities were inspired by this program and established their own friendship campaigns with other European cities affected by the war. In 1950, Valeska visited Ryswyk where she was greeted by parades and ceremonies and titled "The Mother of Ryswyk".

== Painting and sculpture career ==
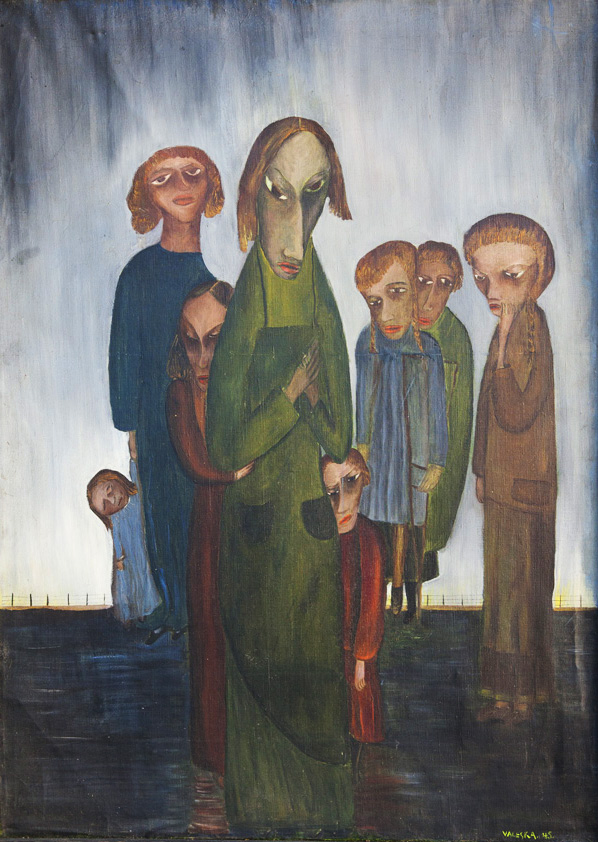
Still Waiting by Lette Valeska, 1945.

Galka Scheyer encouraged Valeska to begin painting in 1939, at the age of 54, despite the fact that she had no formal training. Scheyer had been teaching children to paint spontaneously and expressively, and she welcomed Valeska's inexperience with the medium. Valeska developed her own painting style, characterized by elongated faces and richness in color and detail, although some paintings are muted and somber. Her art depicts Jewish religious motifs and Jewish suffering, although she had grown up removed from these religious and cultural experiences. Her relatives' and her own experiences with the Nazi regime motivated her to rediscover her Jewish roots. When she moved to Los Angeles, she studied Jewish history and literature, joined the Los Angeles Hadassah chapter and participated in other Jewish organizations. Valeska claimed that themes for her paintings were "born unconsciously" from a greater force, however. Her paintings have appeared in gallery exhibitions including her own one-woman show at the La Tortue gallery in Santa Monica in 1970.

Valeska began sculpting with clay in 1955 at the age of 70 with the guidance of Jane Ullman, a sculptor. She had no formal training in this medium either, and she continued to depict Jewish themes in her sculpture. Her sculpture was exhibited at Brandeis University in 1966 and alongside her paintings and photographs in a one-woman show at the Los Angeles Jewish Community Building in 1980, among other venues.
