= Season of Strangers =

Seasons of Strangers
- Still from Season of Strangers
- Directed by: Maya Deren
- Starring: Maya Deren
- Release date: 1959
- Running time: 58 minutes
- Country: United States
- Language: Silent

Season of Strangers (sometimes referred as haiku film) is 1959 unfinished American 16 mm black and white Avant-garde-experimental short film directed by Maya Deren.

== Production ==
The film began as a part of Deren's workshop which took place in Woodstock, New York, during July 6 to July 25, 1959. Deren after claimed that the location was important for the structure of the film. The lyrical aspect of Japanese Haiku motivated the film as well.
