= Butterflies Remember a Mountain =

Butterflies Remember A Mountain is a piano trio written by the American composer Arlene Sierra. The work was commissioned by the Philharmonic Society of the Bremer Philharmoniker through their artist in residence, cellist Leonard Elschenbroich, for the trio of Elschenbroich, Alexei Grynyuk, and Nicola Benedetti. It was first performed at Die Glocke, Bremen on November 13, 2013.

== Composition ==
=== Structure ===
Butterflies Remember a Mountain is a three-movement chamber work with a duration of approximately twelve minutes.

=== Instrumentation ===
Butterflies Remember a Mountain is scored for piano trio, an ensemble of one violin, one cello, and one piano.

== Reception ==
Butterflies Remember a Mountain appears on Sierra's third portrait CD with Bridge Records, Butterflies Remember a Mountain: Arlene Sierra, Vol. 3, released in 2018 that includes chamber works by a variety of International musicians. The work was played during BBC Proms 2015, where it was described as "a work of pointillist detail and shimmering harmonies, painted in a sequence of delicate textural gestures."
