= Aquilo (Sierra) =

Aquilo is an orchestral work written by the American composer Arlene Sierra. The work was first performed at Tokyo Opera City by the Tokyo Philharmonic Orchestra on May 27, 2001, with Susanna Mälkki conducting. A revised version of the work was published in 2001 by Cecilian Music and recorded by the BBC National Orchestra of Wales for Bridge Records in 2014.

== Composition ==
=== Background ===
Aquilo was composed as the final movement of a larger work Ad Aquilonem (later renamed Aquae), presented by the composer in partial fulfilment of the requirements for the degree Doctor of Musical Arts in Music Composition at the University of Michigan, Ann Arbor. Aquilo is a classical name for the Northeast wind as designated by the Roman architect and engineer Vitruvius in his Ten Books on Architecture.

=== Structure ===
Aquilo is a single-movement orchestral work with a duration of approximately ten minutes.

=== Instrumentation ===
Aquilo calls for 3 flutes (2nd doubling piccolo, 3rd doubling alto flute), 3 Oboes (3rd doubling English horn), 3 clarinets in B flat (2nd doubling E♭ clarinet, 3rd doubling bass clarinet), 3 bassoons (3rd doubling contrabassoon), 4 horns in F, 3 trumpets in C, 3 trombones, tuba, timpani, percussion (3 players - vibraphone, marimba, crotales, bass drum, bongo, sizzle cymbal, crash cymbals, suspended cymbal, claves, vibraslap, wood block, whip, triangle, mark tree, tam tam),harp, piano (doubling celeste), strings

== Reception ==
The world premiere of Aquilo took place as part of the Toru Takemitsu Composition Award events at Tokyo Opera City. Oliver Knussen awarded the work joint-first prize. Sierra was the first woman composer to win this award.

In a review of the U.K. premiere with the BBC National Orchestra of Wales, Glyn Pursglove states, "Sierra’s ‘Aquilo’ represents the genesis of one of these winds, evoking too the process by which it is later joined by three more winds and then an additional four, before emerging alone again and finally breaking down, returning to the elements of its original creation. As a programme it invites music of great fluidity and momentum as well as the layering of one musical line on top of another, and Sierra doesn't turn down the invitation. This is high-energy music, turbulent and vivacious; but Sierra is attentive to variations of pace and volume, relatively serene passages juxtaposed with more tumultuous writing, quieter moments with climaxes. It got a performance of precision and clarity of texture, which brought out the piece's pleasing sense of structural completeness."

In a review of the U.S. premiere with the Utah Symphony, Rick Mortenson states, "Employing the orchestra in a wholly original way, it evoked the fearsome mystery of the wind as it might have appeared to the ancient mind. Though clearly atonal and hinting at serialism, Aquilo was quite accessible and at times reminiscent, in its rhythmic drive and sense of motion, of John Adams’ Short Ride in a Fast Machine. At other times the mood was ethereal, and still at others fierce and angry."

In a review of the recording, Andrew Clements describes Aquilo as "startlingly fresh and assured for a first orchestral work."
