= Talley Beatty =

American dancer (1918–1995)

Talley Beatty (22 December 1918 – 29 April 1995) was born in Cedar Grove, Louisiana, a section of Shreveport, but grew up in Chicago, Illinois. He is considered one of the greatest of African American choreographers, and also bears the titles dancer, doctor, and dance company director. After studying under Katherine Dunham and Martha Graham, Beatty went on to do solo work and choreograph his own works which center on the social issues, experiences, and everyday life of African Americans. Beatty and his technique and style of dancing were both praised and criticized by critics and dancers of his day.

== Dance background ==
Beatty began studying dance at the age of eleven with Katherine Dunham. He learned her style of dancing, which was heavily based on her African and Caribbean studies of dance in the West Indies. He was a part of Dunham’s company and performed in several shows with them. He also trained under Martha Graham in the 1940s. He left the Dunham troupe in 1946 to continue his studies in New York City. He took ballet lessons in New York, but because of racism he was forced to attend dance classes in the early mornings or late nights in a dressing room while classes were going on in an adjacent studio.

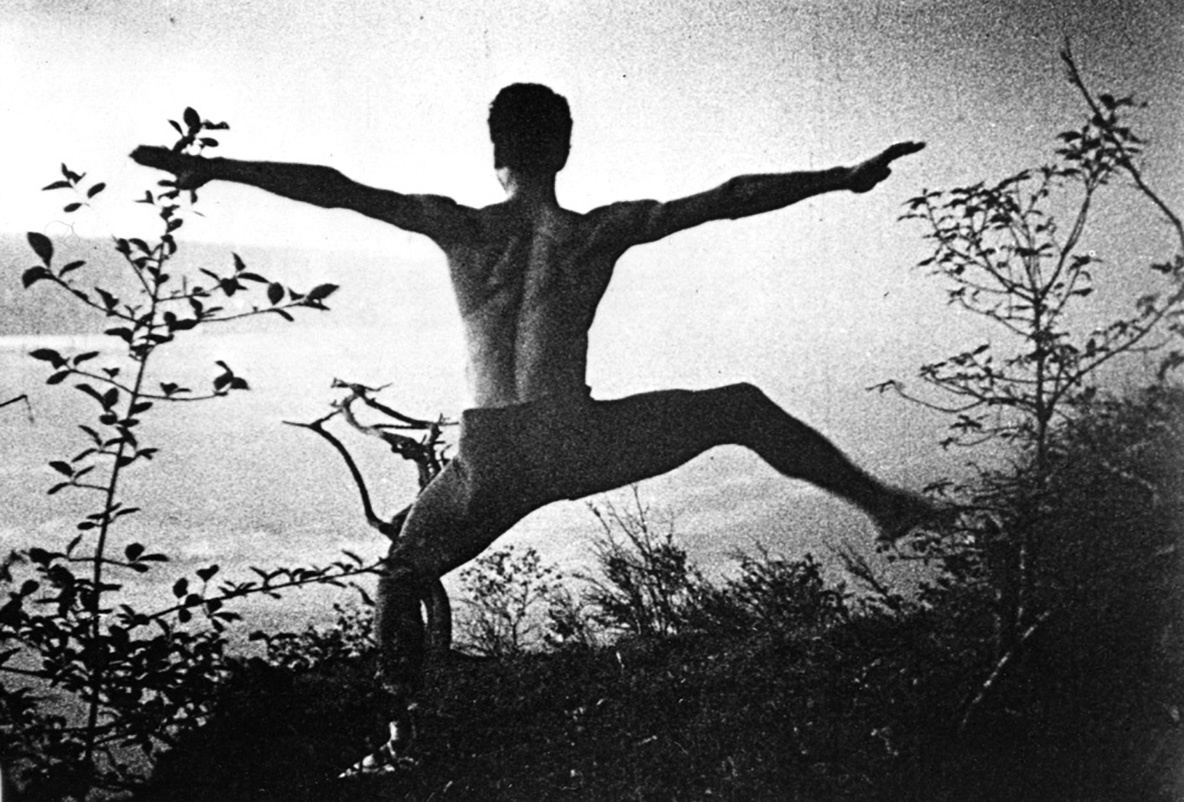
Beatty in a still from the film A Study in Choreography for Camera (1945)

Beatty continued his work as a solo artist and choreographer. He explored a variety of different dance roles and styles. He appeared in films such as Maya Deren's A Study in Choreography for Camera (1945) and stage shows such as Helen Tamiris’s revue Inside U.S.A. (1948). He danced in Broadway musicals such as Cabin in the Sky. He was nominated for a Tony Award in 1977 for choreography for the Broadway show Your Arms Too Short to Box with God (1976).

He also danced in nightclubs, for musical theater, and on the concert stage. He even did a minstrel ballet titled Blackface. Beatty also choreographed for a variety of choreographers including Ruth Page, Lew Christiansen, George Balanchine, and Syvilla Fort. He choreographed over fifty ballets and did work in America and Europe.

== Dance technique ==
Many dancers and critics described Beatty’s dance style as a mix between jazz and ballet. "His self-described style is a mixture of Graham connective steps, Dunham technique, and a little ballet with Louisiana hot sauce on it". His choreography is also described as "fast, exuberant, [and] explosive," Beatty explored movement that extended outward from the extremities such as leg extensions and back arches. Dancers in the documentary film Talley Beatty: Conversations with Contemporary Masters of American Modern Dance state that his choreography is very physically demanding and technically challenging and that in order to dance in one of his works a strong knowledge in at least four different disciplines, including ballet and modern dance, is needed.

== Career ==
=== Early career ===
In the 1930s and 1940s, black modern dancers began breaking down racial barriers and entering the concert dance space. Among them was Katherine Dunham who took a young Talley Beatty under her wing and gave him his first performance opportunities in her company. In 1931, Beatty performed with Dunham’s company at "The First Negro Dance Recital in America," organized by Edna Guy. Beatty also had a prolific career, for a black dancer of the time, in TV.

Like all black dancers at the time, Beatty's early career was marked by immense racial prejudice. In the documentary Free to Dance: The African American Presence in Modern Dance, Beatty is asked to discuss the hardships in his early television career. He comments, saying:

"I got a lot of TV work at that time. But when TV became commercial, it was just like this: people who were dancing with me, who were white, got the jobs. The only time I worked in TV and got splendid reviews was before it began to really pay. And that line of demarcation. I'd see these whole phrases of my work being done everywhere, on Broadway, television, on various companies, I was flattered. Not flattered, but it was interesting to me. And they took the parts of the work that were really my innards."

Despite the immense barriers to entry for black dancers, Beatty had a very successful career for a black dancer of his time. He performed in the Broadway show Cabin in the Sky (1940). Beatty appeared in the films Carnival of Rhythm (1940) and Stormy Weather (1943). He also performed in Showboat (1946) alongside Pearl Primus, Joe Nash, and Alma Sutton, and later in Inside U.S.A. (1948). He performed Blackface (1947) with Ballet Society, an early Balanchine company.

==== A Study in Choreography for Camera (1945) ====
Maya Deren is known as one of the most influential experimental filmmakers of the 20th century. Deren was greatly influenced by Katherine Dunham, who was studying Haitian dance styles around the same time Deren was interested in making works about Vodou rituals and the ethnography of Haiti. In 1945, Deren collaborated with Dunham's student Talley Beatty in the creation of A Study in Choreography for Camera. This collaborative work championed a cross-cultural artistic exploration. Scholars have posited many lasting effects of this collaboration:

Hannah Durkin writes, in her article, Cinematic "Pas de Deux": The Dialogue between Maya Deren's Experimental Filmmaking and Talley Beatty's Black Ballet Dancer in "A Study in Choreography for Camera" (1945):

"The film should thus be read as a collaborative, cross-cultural celebration of black cultural practices and artistry that combines a visual interpretation of Caribbean ritual form with Beatty's balletic technique and breaks down racialized-looking relationships by implicating the viewer in the psychological intensity and virtuosity of his dance."

The film explores freeing the body from any one space or temporality. Deren cuts together footage of Beatty dancing in multiple locations, for example, leaping from the forest into a museum. The camera effectively becomes Beatty's partner, making the film able to be read as an interracial one. Deren's transparency in her inspiration being taken from Dunham's work was a break from other white artists of the time who rarely commented on their influences.

=== Jacob's Pillow ===
Beatty's company first performed at Jacob's Pillow in 1948, premiering his famous work, Southern Landscape. The group came back to the Pillow to perform in 1952 and 1960.

Beatty's work continued to be shown at the Pillow even after the end of his company. Ballet Hispánico performed Beatty's Caravanserai on August 17, 1984. The Dayton Contemporary Dance Company performed "Mourner’s Bench" in 1990. In 1992, just three years before his death, Beatty returned to the Pillow for a final time to oversee Philadanco’s revival of Southern Landscape.

=== Later career ===
==== Choreography ====
After leaving Dunham’s company, gaining increased recognition as a choreographer, Beatty went on to choreograph for companies including Alvin Ailey, Batsheva, and Boston Ballet. Some of Beatty's most notable concert works include Road to Phoebe Snow (1959) with music by Duke Ellington, Congo Tango Palace (1960), Caravanserai (1971), and The Stack Up (1983). He also choreographed for Broadway shows: a revival of House of Flowers (1968), Don’t Bother Me I Can’t Cope (1970), and Your Arms too Short to Box with God.

== Criticisms ==
John Martin, a famous white dance critic during the early to mid-1900s, criticized Beatty’s dance style as too much ballet during this particular time period, in which there was much racism and stereotyping, ballet was thought of as a "high art" that was reserved for white dancers. Other critics such as Margaret Lloyd praised Beatty's technique in her work The Borzoi Book of Modern Dance. Lloyd wrote that she found his leaps "phenomenal, a sort of universal wish fulfillment to navigate the air".

== Themes in choreography ==
Beatty's signature choreographic style was characterized by fast, energetic movements that seemed to explode out of the dancers' bodies. There was an anger and ferocity in his movement vocabulary.

Beatty’s work explored themes around the struggles and everyday life of African Americans. Many of his pieces focused on his own "personal statements about alienation, racial discrimination, and the hardships of urban life". In the film Conversations with Contemporary Masters of American Modern Dance Beatty talks about some of his more well-known choreographic works. According to Beatty Southern Landscape, a five-part dance, is a description of the time right after the Reconstruction period in the South. The dance explores an event in history described in Howard Fast's novel Freedom Road. The plot centers around a group of black and white farmers who had happily formed a community together before being literally destroyed by the Ku Klux Klan. After the slaughter, people went into the fields at night to retrieve the bodies of their loved ones. The most well-known and famous solo section of the dance, titled Mourner’s Bench is about a man returning from recovering a body and reflecting on the ideas of hope and strength.

=== Mourner's Bench ===
The third section of Southern Landscape, Mourner's Bench is arguable Beatty's most well-known and enduring work. In an interview for the documentary "Free to Dance," Beatty said that he got the inspiration for Mourner's Bench after reading Freedom Road (1944) by Howard Fast. Freedom Road is a historical fiction set in the Reconstruction era that shows the complicated layers of reconstruction in the South directly after the Civil War.

Beatty goes on to explain his intention in choreographing Mourner's Bench:

It's a group expression of grief and then it's a personal expression of grief, and he is -- he is thinking upon the events of the day. And he's pushing, and just moving across the bench, and looking out, moving across the bench. All of the movements have to do directly with what he has just experienced that day.

His most notable work, "Mourner’s Bench" was restaged in many companies like the Dayton Contemporary Dance Company.
