= Ensemble for Somnambulists =

- Directed by: Maya Deren
- Screenplay by: Maya Deren
- Produced by: Maya Deren
- Starring: Frank Ionson; Brian Macdonald; Hannah Winner; Cynthia Barrett; Terry Chapman
- Cinematography: Graeme Ferguson; Bruce Parsons
- Production company: Toronto Film Society Workshop
- Release date: 1951
- Running time: 7 minutes
- Country: United States
- Language: Silent

Ensemble for Somnambulists is a 1951 American unfinished experimental silent short. It was written, produced, and directed by Maya Deren. The film was made while Deren was teaching a workshop for the Toronto Film Society. The cinematography was by Graeme Ferguson and Bruce Parsons. The film stars Frank Ionson, Brian Macdonald, Hannah Winner, Cynthia Barrett and Terry Chapman. Dorothy Burritt and Moira Armour provided production assistance. The film was shot at Sovereign Film Studio in Toronto.

The film was never completed and is officially unpublished, but it has been restored and occasionally screens along with Deren's other films. It is sort of a preliminary sketch for her next film, The Very Eye of Night.

== Cast ==
- Cynthia Barrett as Female Dancer
- Terry Chapman as Ensemble Dancer 1
- Frank Ionson as Ensemble Dancer 2
- Brian Macdonald as Male Dancer
- Hannah Winner as Ensemble Dancer 3
