= Bird Symphony =

Bird Symphony is an orchestral work written by the American composer Arlene Sierra. The work was commissioned by the Utah Symphony, Thierry Fischer, music director. It was first performed at Abravanel Hall on April 16, 2022.

== Composition ==
=== Background ===
Bird Symphony was commissioned by the Utah Symphony as part of the composer's role as Utah Symphony Composer in Association. About "Bird Symphony", Sierra states "I'm really interested in this idea of modern pastoral. For older generations, certainly in the Romantic period, it was about nature being perfect, how a human lost in the countryside admires the beauty of nature. Now, our situation is so different. First, we understand these processes and how complex nature is and how brutal nature is, and the Romantics never really thought much about that. Also, we're living with the consequences of the 19th and 20th centuries where we were destroying nature while the artists were going out and swooning over it. I'm really interested in the idea of wrestling with this predicament that we're in where we love nature, we understand it so much better, and we're losing it all at the same time."

=== Structure ===
Bird Symphony is a four-movement orchestral work with a duration of approximately twenty-four minutes.

The first movement "Warblers" is inspired by the American Warbler species, some of which are native to Utah. Sierra describes a "kind of frenetic, warbling music, but it's built on the actual birdsongs... making the whole orchestra sound like this little tiny thing but on a massive scale."

The second movement "Hermits and Captives" is performed alongside a recording of a hermit thrush. Sierra wrote this second movement during 2020 when the first COVID lockdown took place in her home city of London. The movement incorporates the songs of captive birds, such as canaries and finches as well as one of the birdsongs from Ravel's Daphnis et Chloe. Sierra states, "I feel such a kinship with the composers who love birds, and Ravel really is my touchstone. The meticulousness and elegance of his writing, and there's a very profound expression that's kind of under the surface." Like Respighi in his Pines of Rome, the second movement utilizes a recording of a birdsong with which the orchestra interacts. Sierra recalled hearing the Respighi piece after visiting Rome in the 1990s and realizing that a lot of the nature depicted was gone. "I so remember hearing that beautiful nightingale call on the clarinet and knowing that Rome doesn't sound like that anymore," she said. "All the piazzas are parking lots now. That movement from 1925, is a time capsule, and it's so poignant, and it's so sad."

The third movement "Female Birdsong" is a scherzo featuring the songs of exclusively female birds, prompted by renewed interest in the existence of songs from female birds. Sierra states, "We are living with the legacy of Victorian ornithologists who are all men and didn't think the female birds sang."

The fourth movement is entitled "Utahraptor", named after the large, carnivorous, feathered dinosaur whose bones were discovered in Southern Utah, providing a crucial link indicating that birds descended from dinosaurs. Sierra states, "I imagined this kind of menacing birdsong turning into this absolutely terrifying raptor dinosaur idea. It's a sort or primitive, rhythmic, growing sort of terrifying transformation."

=== Instrumentation ===
Bird Symphony calls for two flutes and piccolo, two oboes and English horn, two clarinets and bass clarinet, two bassoons, contrabassoon, four horns, three trumpets, three trombones, tuba, percussion (three players: vibraphone, xylophone, clash cymbals, marimba, tam tam, suspended cymbal, triangle, ratchet, claves, gourd, low flat gong, cow bell, castanets, wood block, snare drum, tambourine, bass drum), timpani, harp, piano, and strings

== Reception ==
About Bird Symphony, conductor Thierry Fischer stated, "everything is suggested; it's not a statement. For example: if you see a bird flying, it's so beautiful, and it creates a kind of emotion. But the bird doesn't fly to create an emotion. The bird flies because that's what a bird does. It's a little bit like that in Arlene's music. She's not writing the Bird Symphony to make people cry. She writes because it's her way to be inspired by nature and by insects and all that. And then it creates beauty, but she's not writing to create beauty. This aspect of both the suggestive and what's behind it is, to me as a French impressionist conductor, absolutely thrilling and super motivating."

As part of his review of the world premiere, Rick Mortenson described Bird Symphony as "something new, ecstatic, and far from its avian inspiration. The finale "Utahraptor" created an infectious rhythm that took the audience on a primordial journey from birdsong to whatever noise its dinosaur ancestor might have made. The rhythmic motives were particularly effective when they spread to the bassoons, creating a unique and delightful sound, and led to an exciting, unique climax."
