= Moler (Sierra) =

Moler is an orchestral work written by the American composer Arlene Sierra. The work was commissioned by the Seattle Symphony, Ludovic Morlot, music director. It was first performed at Benaroya Hall on October 26, 2012.

== Composition ==
=== Background ===
Moler was commissioned by the Seattle Symphony as part of Sonic Evolution project: A showcase of new works from the younger generation of composers that would take inspiration, but no quotations, from popular music with a Seattle connection. Sierra composed "Moler" — Spanish for "to grind" — after selecting Alice In Chains' 1995 hit "Grind" as the inspiration for her contribution. Sierra states, "The band has a hard, visceral sound, which is something I try to do with my orchestral music,... I expected 'Grind' to be sexy, but it's about anxiety. So I was imagining the orchestra's teeth grinding in a certain way."

=== Structure ===
Moler is a single-movement orchestral work with a duration of approximately nine minutes.

The title is Spanish for "to grind," and the piece was inspired by the composer's habit of grinding her teeth while sleeping. Moler is a dance-infused piece that uses the "grinding" idea to suggest unusual combinations of instrumental timbres and textures. Its overall musical narrative was partly suggested by the varying tensions and relaxations of sleep and dreaming.

The composer writes:

Moler is the Spanish word for "grind," and this work takes its compositional impulses from a particular form of grinding, bruxism, that is the involuntary phenomenon of teeth grinding that occurs during sleep. When reading about bruxism I came across medical research that revealed that a sleeper's heart rate increases with the onset of bruxism and that fluctuations coincided with phases of dreaming. Using the resources of a large orchestra, Moler replicates these characteristics, together with associated qualities of roughness, nervousness, and energy. Reflecting the relationship between bruxism and sleep patterns, the music shifts its energy levels, sometimes abruptly, between the frenetic and the relaxed, and back again. In addition to rhythmic parameters, orchestral motifs are made to "grind" against each other with starkly contrasting pitch and timbral materials. Timbral roughness is achieved through various contrasts including the pairing of muted trombones with low oboes, using flutter-tonguing in the brass, glissando effects in the timpani, and giving solo material to instruments including contrabassoon and muted bass trombone, among other orchestrational and compositional choices. A constant, quick pulse is implicitly present throughout Moler, but syncopations and gaps in the texture add instability and drama. A two-note motif, short-long, and its slightly longer short-short-long version recur throughout. Otherwise the surface of the music constantly changes via orchestration and dynamics. Strings, brass, woodwinds, and percussion, deployed in distinct layers or in combinations of instrumental sections, vie for the foreground. Sharp attacks in piano and percussion are offset by sustained music in strings or winds, low sounds contrast with high, unpitched with pitched, all coming together in a satisfying, powerful narrative.

=== Instrumentation ===
Moler calls for two flutes and piccolo, two oboes and English horn, two clarinets and bass clarinet, two bassoons, contrabassoon, four horns, two trumpets, two trombones, tuba, percussion (two players: marimba, vibraphone, crotales, ratchet, cowbell, suspended cymbal, tam-tam, gongs [medium and high], woodblocks [medium and high], sand blocks, güiro, vibraslap, glockenspiel, snare drum, bass drum), timpani, harp, and strings

== Reception ==
In 2014, Moler was nominated for Best Contemporary Classical Composition in the Latin GRAMMY awards.

Moler appears on Sierra's second portrait CD with Bridge Records, Game of Attrition: Arlene Sierra, Vol. 2, released in 2014 that includes four orchestral works recorded by the BBC National Orchestra of Wales, Jac Van Steen, conductor. As part of his review of the orchestral disc, Simon Cummings described Moler as "surely one of the best concert-openers of recent years."
