= Nature Symphony (Sierra) =

Symphony by Arlene Sierra, premiered 2017

Nature Symphony is an orchestral work written by the American composer Arlene Sierra. The work was commissioned by the BBC Philharmonic and BBC Radio Three. It was first performed at Bridgewater Hall on November 25, 2017 with Ludovic Morlot conducting.

== Composition ==
=== Background ===
Nature Symphony was commissioned by the BBC Philharmonic and BBC Radio Three. “Nature Symphony” takes its starting point from Sierra's earlier piano trio "Butterflies Remember a Mountain", opening with the same rhythmic material as the trio but expanded to large orchestral forces.

=== Structure ===
Nature Symphony is a three-movement orchestral work with a duration of approximately twenty-one minutes.

The first movement "Mountain of Butterflies" expands on the idea of endless cycles of migration, year after year, via steadily accumulating loops of orchestral texture. A sense of forward motion scaled up to a kind of stasis is achieved, until the movement's sudden arrival.

The second movement "The Black Place: After O'Keeffe" is inspired by Georgia O'Keeffe's paintings of the austere landscapes of New Mexico, specifically the painting Black Place (1944) of the Bisti Badlands. Rhythmic, melodic and harmonic ingredients create a musical landscape with shades of color constantly shifting.

The final movement "Bee Rebellion" is based on the phenomenon of hive collapse, when the insect society can suddenly break down into anarchy; the music features unpredictable cycles and accumulations, with taunting wind solos, all cut short by a brassy, percussion-driven ending that offers no escape.

=== Instrumentation ===
Nature Symphony calls for two flutes and piccolo, two oboes and English horn, two clarinets and bass clarinet, two bassoons, contrabassoon, four horns, three trumpets, three trombones, tuba, percussion (three players: marimba, vibraphone, bass drum, gong (large flat), triangle, claves, tam tam, tambourine, djembe, suspended cymbal, sandblocks, ratchet, large egg shaker), timpani, harp, piano, and strings

== Reception ==
As part of his review of the world premiere, Andrew Clements wrote of Nature Symphony, "The title suggests something programmatic, and the symphony’s three movements all have evocative titles, but there is nothing in them that’s obviously descriptive. Lasting just over 20 minutes, the symphony does what Sierra sets out to do with impressive economy and a succession of striking orchestral ideas. "

In a review of the U.S. premiere with the Utah Symphony, Rick Mortenson states, "Through repeated motives and ostinati — layered on top of one another and providing a backdrop to irregular swoons and swells — Nature Symphony imitates the inevitable but chaotic processes of nature. Listening to it unfold provides a fascination similar to watching birds or insects and puzzling over their behavior. The first movement, “Mountain of Butterflies,” flutters frenetically and occasionally swoops without warning. Though atonal, the piece has a strong rhythmic drive and a captivating sense of motion, and it creates tension and resolution in the development of its three and four note melodic cells.

On January 21, 2022, Nature Symphony was a clue on Jeopardy! in the Symphonies category for its connection to the painting of Georgia O'Keeffe
