= A Study in Choreography for Camera =

1945 American experimental short film

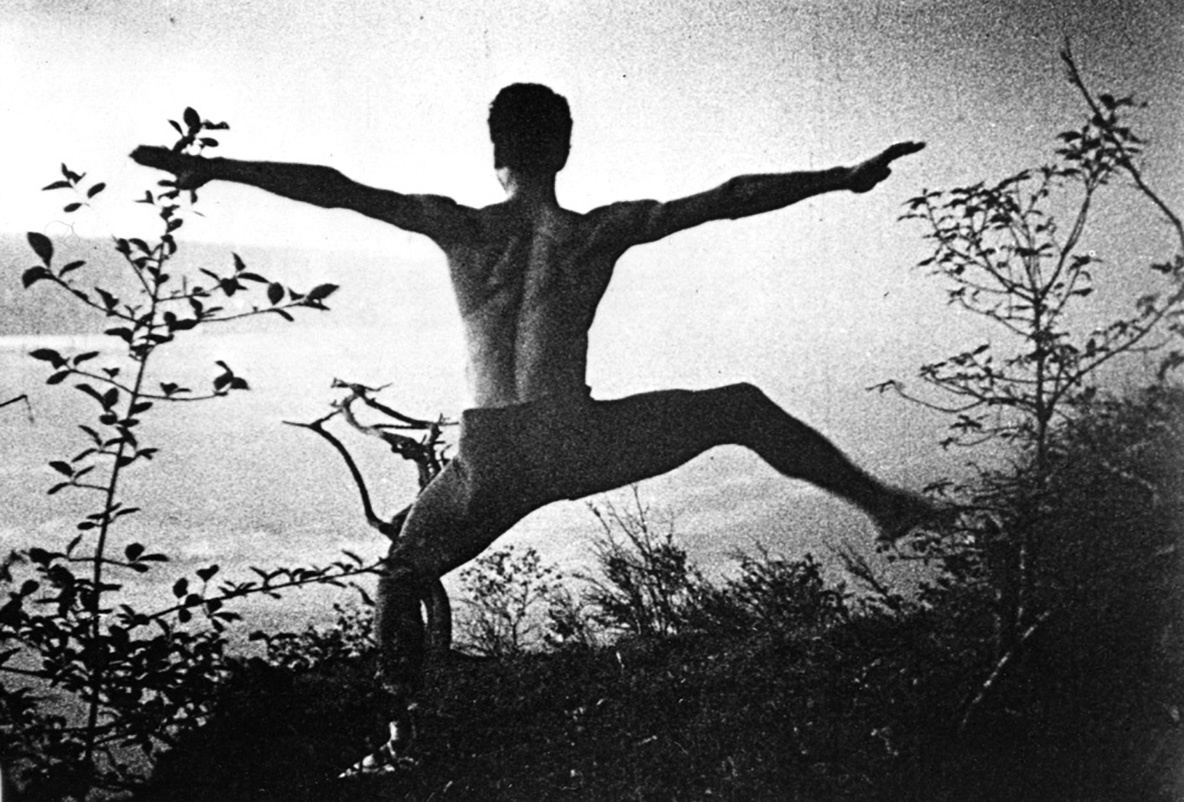
- Still from A Study in Choreography for Camera
- Directed by: Maya Deren
- Starring: Talley Beatty
- Release date: 1945
- Running time: 3 minutes
- Country: United States
- Language: Silent

A Study in Choreography for Camera is a 1945 American experimental silent short film directed by Maya Deren. Shot in black-and-white, the film stars Talley Beatty.

== Cast ==
- Talley Beatty
