= The Very Eye of Night =

1955 experimental short film

- Stills from The Very Eye of Night
- Directed by: Maya Deren
- Written by: Maya Deren
- Starring: Don Freisinger; Richard Sandifer; Patricia Ferrier; Bud Bready; Genaro Gomez; Barbara Levin; Richard Englund; Rosemary Williams; Phillip Salem
- Cinematography: Maya Deren
- Edited by: Maya Deren
- Music by: Teiji Ito
- Release dates: 1955 (Haiti); 1959 (New York)
- Running time: 15 minutes
- Country: United States
- Language: Silent

The Very Eye of Night is 1955 American experimental silent short film written and directed by Maya Deren. Made in collaboration with Metropolitan Opera Ballet School, the film was shot in black-and-white in the 16 mm format, and is projected as photographed in the negative.

The Very of Eye of Night premiered in Port-au-Prince, Haiti, in 1955. It later screened in New York in 1959, with an added musical score by Teiji Ito.

== Cast ==
- Don Freisinger as Gemini
- Richard Sandifer as Gemini
- Patricia Ferrier as Ariel
- Bud Bready as Oberon
- Genaro Gomez as Umbriel
- Barbara Levin as Titania
- Richard Englund as Uranus
- Rosemary Williams as Urania
- Phillip Salem as Noctambulo

== Release ==
The Very Eye of Night was made between 1952 and 1955 in collaboration with choreographer Antony Tudor. The film first premiered in Port-au-Prince, Haiti, in 1955. It later screened in New York in 1959, by which time music by Teiji Ito was added.

In 2002, the film was released on DVD in the United States by Mystic Fire Video.
