= Divine Horsemen: The Living Gods of Haiti =

- Directed by: Maya Deren
- Release date: 1954
- Running time: 52 minutes
- Country: United States
- Language: English

Divine Horsemen: The Living Gods of Haiti is a black-and-white documentary film of approximately 52 minutes. It is about dance and possession in Haitian vodou that was shot by experimental filmmaker Maya Deren between 1947 and 1954.

In 1981, twenty years after Deren's death, the film was completed by Deren's third husband Teiji Ito (1935-1982) and his wife Cherel Winett Ito (1947-1999). Most of the film consists of images of dancing and bodies in motion during rituals in Rada and Petro services.

Deren had studied dance as well as photography and filmmaking. She originally went to Haiti, with the funding from a Guggenheim fellowship, and the stated intention of filming the dancing that forms a crucial part of the vodou ceremony. In 1953, Deren's book Divine Horsemen: The Voodoo Gods of Haiti, on the subject of vodou, was published by Vanguard Press.

The film that resulted, however, reflected Deren's increasing personal engagement with vodou and its practitioners (Wilcken, 1986). While this ultimately resulted in Deren disregarding the guidelines of the fellowship, Deren was able to record scenes that probably would have been inaccessible to other filmmakers.

Deren's original notes, film footage, and wire recordings are in the Maya Deren Collection at Boston University's Howard Gotlieb Archival Research Center and at Anthology Film Archives.
