= Meditation on Violence =

1949 experimental short film

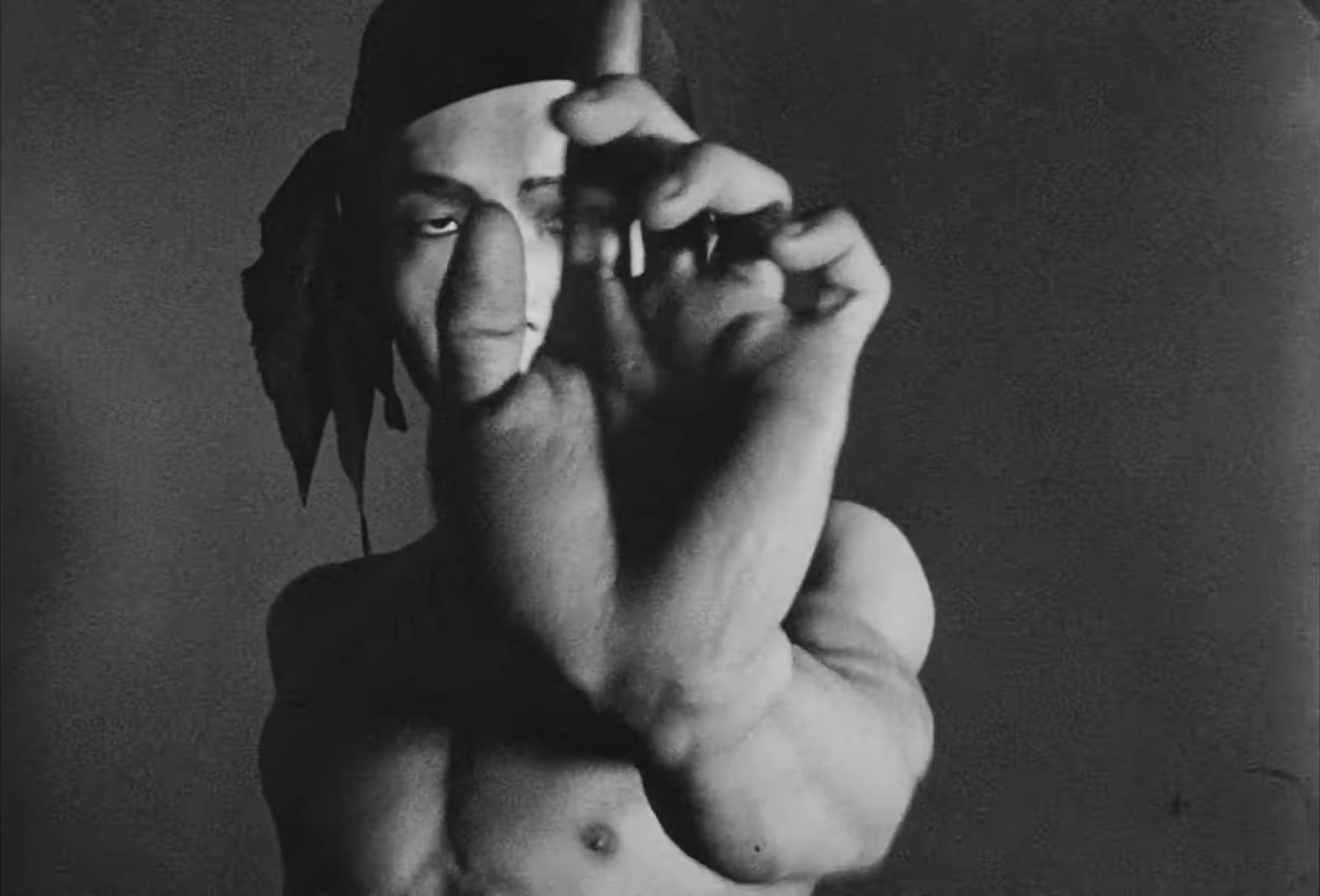
- Chao-Li Chi in a scene from the film
- Directed by: Maya Deren
- Screenplay by: Maya Deren, Chao-Li Chi
- Story by: Maya Deren, Chao-Li Chi
- Starring: Chao-Li Chi
- Music by: Teiji Ito
- Release date: 1948
- Running time: 15 minutes
- Country: United States
- Language: Silent

Meditation on Violence is a 1948 American experimental short film directed by Maya Deren. Shot in 16 mm, It explores in playing out the movements and performance of the Wu-tang ritual. It also obscures the distinction between violence and beauty. The film stars Chao-Li Chi and music by Teiji Ito.

== Cast ==
- Chao-Li Chi - Himself
