= At Land =

1944 silent experimental short film

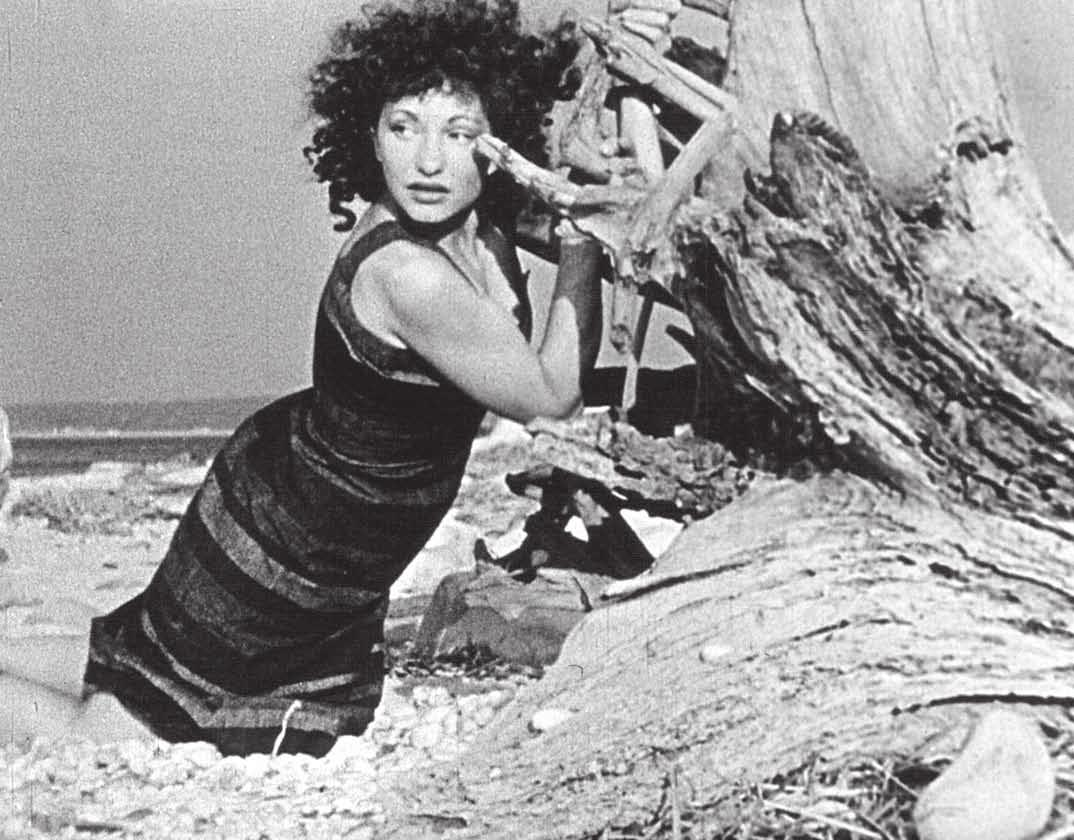
- Deren from the still in the film At Land
- Directed by: Maya Deren
- Written by: Maya Deren
- Starring: Maya Deren; Alexander Hammid; John Cage; Parker Tyler
- Cinematography: Hella Hammid (as Hella Heyman); Alexander Hammid
- Release date: 1944
- Running time: 15 minutes
- Country: USA
- Language: Silent

At Land is a 1944 American experimental silent short film written, directed by, and starring Maya Deren. It has a dream-like narrative in which a woman, played by Deren, is washed up on a beach and goes on a strange journey encountering other people and other versions of herself. Deren once said that the film is about the struggle to maintain one's personal identity.

The composer John Cage and the poet and film critic Parker Tyler were involved in making the film, and appear in the film, which was shot at Amagansett, Long Island.

== Plot ==
A woman is lying amid the waves crashing on a beach. The water retreats and leaves her on the sand. She climbs a nearby piece of driftwood with some difficulty, but when she finally reaches the top, she finds herself at the end of a long dining room table during a bourgeois dinner party. None of the guests acknowledge her presence as she drags herself along the top of the table toward a man (played by graphic designer Alvin Lustig) who is playing chess against himself. Her progress is intercut with footage of her crawling through some underbrush. When she finally gets to the man, he stands up and walks away. The chess pieces begin to move by themselves, and one of the pawns falls off the table. She chases it down a river and over some small waterfalls before giving up.

The woman walks down a dirt road. A man (played by American surrealist poet Philip Lamantia at age 17) begins to talk with her, and as they walk he turns into three other men: first Parker Tyler, then artist and composer John Cage, and finally Alexander Hammid (Deren's real-life husband at the time). She follows the final man into a house where all the furniture is under white dust covers. The woman and a new man, who has appeared under the covers on a divan, stare at each other for several moments. A cat leaps from her arms, and she turns around and leaves. After walking through several doors, she ends up on top of a large rock. She slowly falls down to the ground in several stages and then walks across a field of dunes.

On a beach, the woman gathers rocks in her arms as she walks along, but she is having a hard time and drops the stones as fast as she is able to pick them up. She sees two women (who are dressed like they could have been at the dinner party earlier) playing chess near the water. While they talk and play, the woman gets closer and watches them for a bit before she begins to gently caress their hair. They lose their focus on the game, and the woman grabs the white queen just as it is about to get captured. She runs away with her arms raised, and, as she passes back through all of the places she has previously been on her journey, she exchanges glances with other versions of herself who are still in each location. The woman keeps running after she gets to the beach from the beginning of the film, leaving her footprints behind her in the sand.

== Cast ==
- Maya Deren
- Alexander Hammid
- Hella Hammid
- John Cage
- Parker Tyler
- Philip Lamantia

== Trivia ==
The chess game shown at the beginning and the end is Anderssen - Kieseritzky, proclaimed as the Immortal Game.

== Legacy ==
Film theorist P. Adams Sitney described Stan Brakhage's 1962 film Blue Moses as a reaction to Deren's work, with references to At Land in its circular structure, the sudden costume changes of its protagonist, and its story about footprints. The film is part of Anthology Film Archives' Essential Cinema Repertory collection.

The scenes of Deren on the beach, and of the chess games are referenced in the music video for the band Garbage's 2012 single "Blood for Poppies". English rock musician and former Pink Floyd member David Gilmour, used footage from the film in the official music video for his song "Faces of Stone", directed by Aubrey Powell of Hipgnosis.
