= Maya Deren =

American filmmaker (1917–1961)

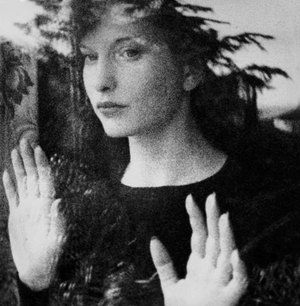
- Deren in the film Meshes of the Afternoon (1943), her debut
- Born: Eleonora Derenkovskaya; May 12 [O.S. April 29], 1917; Kiev, Russian Empire
- Died: October 13, 1961 (aged 44); New York City, U.S.
- Education: New York University; New School of Social Research; Smith College
- Notable work: Films: Meshes of the Afternoon (1943); At Land (1944); A Study in Choreography for Camera (1945); Ritual in Transfigured Time (1946); Meditation on Violence (1947); Divine Horsemen: The Living Gods of Haiti (1953); The Very Eye of Night (1955); Books: An Anagram of Ideas on Art, Form and Film (1946)
- Movement: Avant-garde cinema
- Spouses: Gregory Bardacke (m. 1935; div. 1939) Alexandr Hackenschmied (m. 1942; div. 1947) Teiji Itō (m. 1960)
- Awards: Guggenheim Fellowship 1946; Grand Prix International for Avant-garde Film, Cannes Film Festival 1947

Maya Deren (/ˈdɛrən/; born Eleonora Solomonovna Derenkovskaya; Russian: Элеонора Соломоновна Деренковская; May 12 [O.S. April 29], 1917 – October 13, 1961) was a Russian-born (Note: Cited to the following sources:) American experimental filmmaker and important part of the avant-garde in the 1940s and 1950s. Deren was also a choreographer, dancer, film theorist, poet, lecturer, writer, and photographer.

The function of film, Deren believed, was to create an experience. She combined her expertise in dance and choreography, ethnography, the African spirit religion of Haitian Vodou, symbolist poetry and gestalt psychology (as a student of Kurt Koffka) in a series of perceptual, black-and-white short films. Using editing, multiple exposures, jump-cutting, superimposition, slow-motion, and other camera techniques to her advantage, Deren abandoned established notions of physical space and time, innovating through carefully planned films with specific conceptual aims.

Meshes of the Afternoon (1943), her collaboration with her husband at the time, Alexander Hammid, has been one of the most influential experimental films in American cinema history. Deren went on to make several more films, including but not limited to At Land (1944), A Study in Choreography for Camera (1945), and Ritual in Transfigured Time (1946), writing, producing, directing, editing, and photographing them with help from only one other person, Hella Heyman, her camerawoman.

== Early life ==
Deren was born on May 12 [O.S. April 29], 1917, in Kiev (present-day Ukraine) into a Jewish family, to psychologist Solomon (Alexander) Derenkovsky and Gitel-Malka (Marie) Fiedler, who supposedly named their daughter after the famed Italian actress Eleonora Duse. Shortly before the Russian Revolution, her father studied at the Bekhterev Psychoneurological Institute.

In 1922, the family fled the Ukrainian SSR because of antisemitic pogroms perpetrated by the White Volunteer Army and moved to Syracuse, New York. Her father shortened the family name from Derenkovskaya to "Deren" shortly after they arrived in New York. He became the staff psychiatrist at the State Institute for the Feeble-Minded in Syracuse. Deren's mother was a musician and dancer who had studied these arts in Kiev. In 1928, Deren's parents became naturalized citizens of the United States.

Deren was highly intelligent, starting fifth grade at only eight years old. She attended the International School of Geneva for high school from 1930 to 1933. Her mother moved to Paris, France to be nearer to her while she studied. Deren learned to speak French while she was abroad.

Deren enrolled at Syracuse University at 16, where she began studying journalism and political science. Deren became a highly active socialist activist during the Trotskyist movement in her late teens. She served as National Student Secretary in the National Student office of the Young People's Socialist League and was a member of the Social Problems Club at Syracuse University.

At age 18 in June 1935, she married Gregory Bardacke, a socialist activist whom she met through the Social Problems Club. After his graduation in 1935, she moved to New York City. She finished school at New York University with a Bachelor's degree in literature in June 1936, and returned to Syracuse that fall. She and Bardacke became active in various socialist causes in New York City; and it was during this time that they separated and eventually divorced three years later.

In 1938, Deren attended the New School for Social Research, and received a master's degree in English literature at Smith College. Her Master's thesis was titled The Influence of the French Symbolist School on Anglo-American Poetry (1939). This included works of Pound, Eliot, and the Imagists. By the age of 21, Deren had earned two degrees in literature.

Deren was born into a Jewish family, but felt no affinity for her religion or culture. This most likely comes from her father identifying as agnostic. She was aware of issues happening around the world, so she looked to socialism as a cure. Socialism allowed her to merge her Jewish identity into a universalist worldview.

== Early career ==
After graduation from Smith, Deren returned to New York's Greenwich Village, where she joined the European émigré art scene. She supported herself from 1937 to 1939 by freelance writing for radio shows and foreign-language newspapers. During that time she also worked as an editorial assistant to famous American writers Eda Lou Walton, Max Eastman, and then William Seabrook. She wrote poetry and short fiction, tried her hand at writing a commercial novel, and also translated a work by Victor Serge which was never published. She became known for her European-style handmade clothes, wild red curly hair and fierce convictions.

In 1940, Deren moved to Los Angeles to focus on her poetry and freelance photography. In 1941, Deren wrote to Katherine Dunham—an African American dancer, choreographer, and anthropologist of Caribbean culture and dance—suggesting a children's book on dance and applying for a managerial job for her and her dance troupe; she later became Dunham's assistant and publicist. Deren travelled with the troupe for a year, learning greater appreciation for dance, as well as interest and appreciation for Haitian culture. Dunham's fieldwork influenced Deren's studies of Haitian culture and Vodou mythology. At the end of touring a new musical Cabin in the Sky, the Dunham dance company stopped in Los Angeles for several months to work in Hollywood. It was there that Deren met Alexandr Hackenschmied (who later changed his name to Alexander Hammid), a celebrated Czech-born photographer and cameraman who would become Deren's second husband in 1942. Hackenschmied had fled from Czechoslovakia in 1938 after the Sudetenland crisis.

Deren and Hammid lived together in Laurel Canyon, where he helped her with her still photography which focused on local fruit pickers in Los Angeles. Of two still photography magazine assignments of 1943 to depict artists active in New York City, including Ossip Zadkine, her photographs appeared in the Vogue magazine article. The other article intended for Mademoiselle magazine was not published, but three signed enlargements of photographs intended for this article, all depicting Deren's friend New York ceramist Carol Janeway, are preserved in the MoMA and the Philadelphia Museum of Art. All prints were from Janeway's estate.

== Personal life ==
In 1943, she moved to a bungalow on Kings Road in Hollywood and adopted the name Maya, a pet name her second husband Hammid coined.

In 1944, back in New York City, her social circle included Marcel Duchamp, André Breton, John Cage, and Anaïs Nin. In 1944, Deren filmed The Witch's Cradle in Peggy Guggenheim's Art of This Century gallery with Duchamp featured in the film.

In the December 1946 issue of Esquire magazine, a caption for her photograph teased that she "experiments with motion pictures of the subconscious, but here is finite evidence that the lady herself is infinitely photogenic." Her third husband, Teiji Itō, said: "Maya was always a Russian. In Haiti she was a Russian. She was always dressed up, talking, speaking many languages and being a Russian."

== Film career ==
Deren defined cinema as an art, provided an intellectual context for film viewing, and filled a theoretical gap for the kinds of independent films that film societies were featuring. As Sarah Keller states, “Maya Deren lays claim to the honor of being one of the most important pioneers of the American film avant-garde with a scant seventy-five or so minutes of finished films to her credit.”

Deren began to screen and distribute her films in the United States, Canada, and Cuba, lecturing and writing on avant-garde film theory, and additionally on Vodou. In February 1946 she booked the Provincetown Playhouse in Greenwich Village for a major public exhibition, titled Three Abandoned Films, in which she showed Meshes of the Afternoon (1943), At Land (1944) and A Study in Choreography for Camera (1945). The event was completely sold out, inspiring Amos Vogel's formation of Cinema 16, the most successful film society of the 1950s.

In 1946, she was awarded a Guggenheim Fellowship for "Creative Work in the Field of Motion Pictures", and in 1947, won the Grand Prix International for avant-garde film at the Cannes Film Festival for Meshes of the Afternoon. She then created a scholarship for experimental filmmakers, the Creative Film Foundation.

Between 1952 and 1955, Deren collaborated with the Metropolitan Opera Ballet School and Antony Tudor to create The Very Eye of Night.

Deren's background and interest in dance appears in her work, most notably in the short film A Study in Choreography for Camera (1945). This combination of dance and film has often been referred to as "choreocinema", a term first coined by American dance critic John Martin.

In her work, she often focused on the unconscious experience, such as in Meshes of the Afternoon. This is thought to be inspired by her father who was a student of psychiatrist Vladimir Bekhterev who explored trance and hypnosis as neurological states. She also regularly explored themes of gender identity, incorporating elements of introspection and mythology. Despite her feminist subtext, she was mostly unrecognized by feminist writers at the time, even influential writers Claire Johnston and Laura Mulvey ignored Deren at the time, though Mulvey later would give Deren this recognition, since their works were often in conversation with each other.

== Major films ==
=== Meshes of the Afternoon (1943) ===
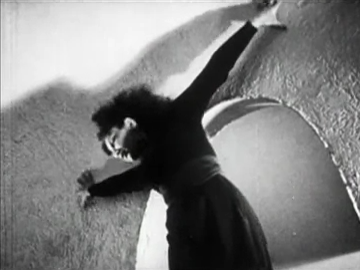
Deren in Meshes of the Afternoon (1943)

In 1943, Deren purchased a used 16mm Bolex camera with some of the inheritance money after her father's death from a heart attack. This camera was used to make her first and best-known film, Meshes of the Afternoon (1943), made in collaboration with Hammid in their Los Angeles home on a budget of $250. Meshes of the Afternoon is recognized as a seminal American avant-garde film. Critics have seen autobiographical elements in the film, as well as thoughts about woman as subject rather than as object. Originally a silent film with no dialogue, music for the film was composed, long after its initial screenings, by Deren's third husband Teiji Itō in 1952. The film can be described as an expressionistic "trance film", full of dramatic angles and innovative editing. It investigates the ephemeral ways in which the protagonist's unconscious mind works and makes connections between objects and situations. A woman, played by Maya Deren, walks up to a house in Los Angeles, falls asleep and seems to have a dream. The sequence of walking up to the gate on the partially shaded road restarts numerous times, resisting conventional narrative expectations, and ends in various situations inside the house. Movement from the wind, shadows and the music sustain the heartbeat of the dream. Recurring symbols include a cloaked figure, mirrors, a key, and a knife.

The loose repetition and rhythm cut short any expectation of a conventional narrative, heightening the dream-like qualities. The camera initially does not show her face, which precludes identification with a particular woman, which creates a universalizing, totalizing effect- as it is easier to relate to an unknown, faceless woman. Multiple selves appear, shifting between the first and third person, suggesting that the super-ego is at play, which is in line with the psychoanalytic Freudian staircase and flower motifs. This kind of Freudian interpretation, which she disagreed with, led Deren to add sound, composed by Teiji Itō, to the film.

Another interpretation is that each film is an example of a "personal film". Her first film, Meshes of the Afternoon, explores a woman's subjectivity and relation to the external world. Georges Sadoul said Deren may have been "the most important figure in the post-war development of the personal, independent film in the U.S.A." In featuring the filmmaker as the woman whose subjectivity in the domestic space is explored, the feminist dictum "the personal is political" is foregrounded. As with her other films on self-representation, Deren navigates conflicting tendencies of the self and the "other", through doubling, multiplication and merging of the woman in the film. Following a dreamlike quest with allegorical complexity, Meshes of the Afternoon has an enigmatic structure and a loose affinity with both film noir and domestic melodrama. The film is famous for how it resonated with Deren's own life and anxieties. According to a review in The Moving Image, "this film emerges from a set of concerns and passionate commitments that are native to Deren's life and her trajectory. The first of these trajectories is Deren's interest in socialism during her youth and university years".

==== Director's notes ====
There is no concrete information about the conception of Meshes of the Afternoon beyond that Deren offered the poetic ideas and Hammid was able to turn them into visuals, as she envisioned them. Deren's initial concept began on the terms of a subjective camera, one that would show the point of view of herself without the aid of mirrors and would move as her eyes through spaces. According to the earliest program note, she describes Meshes of the Afternoon as follows:

This film is concerned with the interior experiences of an individual. It does not record an event which could be witnessed by other persons. Rather, it reproduces the way in which the subconscious of an individual will develop, interpret, and elaborate an apparently simple and casual incident into a critical emotional experience.

=== At Land (1944) ===
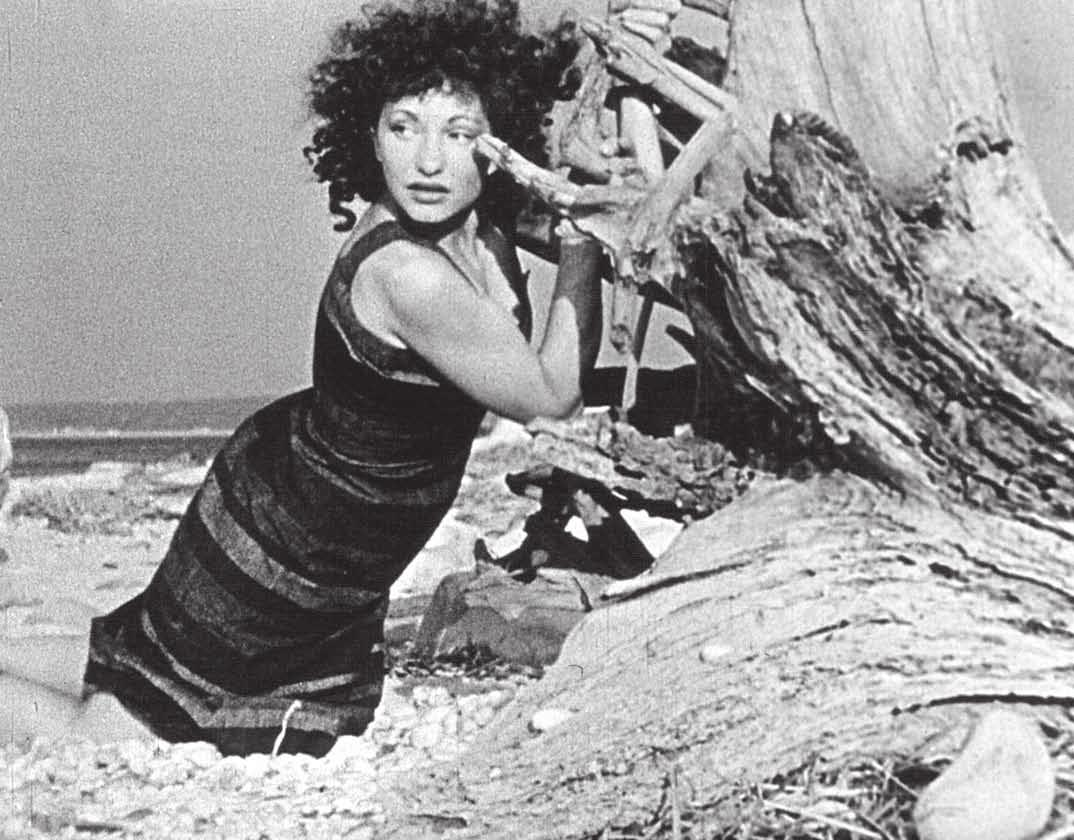
Deren in a still from the film At Land (1944)

Deren filmed At Land in Port Jefferson and Amagansett, New York in the summer of 1944. Taking on more of an environmental psychologist's perspective, Deren "externalizes the hidden dynamic of the external world...as if I had moved from a concern with the life of the fish, to a concern with the sea which accounts for the character of the fish and its life." Maya Deren washes up on the shore of the beach, and climbs up a piece of driftwood that leads to a room lit by chandeliers, and one long table filled with men and women smoking. She seems to be invisible to the people as she crawls across the table, uninhibited; her body continues seamlessly again onto a new frame, crawling through foliage; following the flowing pattern of water on rocks; following a man across a farm, to a sick man in bed, through a series of doors, and finally popping up outside on a cliff. She shrinks in the wide frame as she walks farther away from the camera, up and down sand dunes, then frantically collecting rocks back on the shore. Her expression seems confused when she sees two women playing chess in the sand. She runs back through the entire sequence, and because of the jump-cuts, it seems as though she is a double or "doppelganger", where her earlier self sees her other self running through the scene. Some of her movements are controlled, suggesting a theatrical, dancer-like quality, while some have an almost animalistic sensibility as she crawls through the seemingly foreign environments. This is one of Deren's films in which the focus is on the character's exploration of her own subjectivity in her physical environment, inside as well as outside her subconscious, although it has a similar amorphous quality compared to her other films.

=== A Study in Choreography for Camera (1945) ===
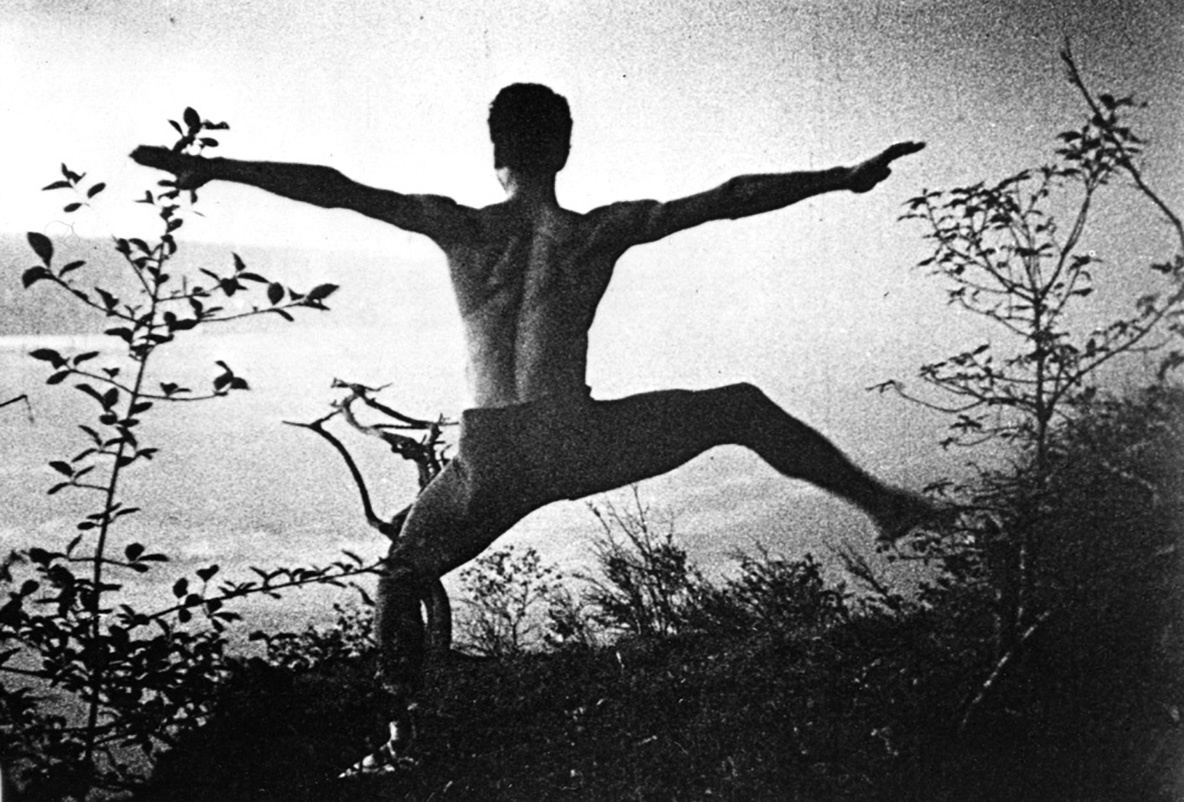
Still from A Study in Choreography for Camera

In the spring of 1945 she made A Study in Choreography for Camera, which Deren said was "an effort to isolate and celebrate the principle of the power of movement." The compositions and varying speeds of movement within the frame inform and interact with Deren's meticulous edits and varying film speeds and motions to create a dance that Deren said could only exist on film. Excited by the way the dynamic of movement is greater than anything else within the film, Deren established a completely new sense of the word "geography" as the movement of the dancer transcends and manipulates the ideas of both time and space.

"For Deren, no transition is needed between a place outside (such as a forest, or a park, or the beach) and an interior room. One action can be performed across different physical spaces, as in A Study in Choreography For Camera (1945), and in this way sews together layers of reality, thereby suggesting continuity between different levels of consciousness."

At just under three minutes long, A Study in Choreography for Camera is a fragment depicting a carefully constructed exploration of a man who dances in a forest, and then seems to teleport to the inside of a house because of how continuous his movements are from one place to the next. The edit is broken, choppy, showing different angles and compositions, and even with parts in slow-motion, Deren is able to keep the quality of the leap smooth and seemingly uninterrupted. The choreography is perfectly synched as he seamlessly appears in an outdoor courtyard and then returns to an open, natural space. It shows a progression from nature to the confines of society, and back to nature. The figure belongs to dancer and choreographer Talley Beatty, whose last movement is a leap across the screen back to the natural world. Deren and Beatty met through Katherine Dunham, while Deren was her assistant and Beatty was a dancer in her company. It is worth noting that Beatty collaborated heavily with Deren in the creation of this film, hence why he is credited alongside Deren in the film's credit sequence. The film is also subtitled 'Pas de Deux', a dance term referring to a dance between two people, or in this case, a collaboration between Deren and Beatty.

A Study in Choreography for Camera was one of the first experimental dance films to be featured in The New York Times as well as Dance Magazine.

=== Ritual in Transfigured Time (1946) ===
By her fourth film, Deren discussed in An Anagram that she felt special attention should be given to unique possibilities of time and that the form should be ritualistic as a whole. Ritual in Transfigured Time began in August and was completed in 1946. It explored the fear of rejection and the freedom of expression in abandoning ritual, looking at the details as well as the bigger ideas of the nature and process of change. The main roles were played by Deren herself and the dancers Rita Christiani and Frank Westbrook.

=== Meditation on Violence (1948) ===
Deren's Meditation on Violence was made in 1948. Chao-Li Chi's performance obscures the distinction between violence and beauty. It was an attempt to "abstract the principle of ongoing metamorphosis", found in Ritual in Transfigured Time, though Deren felt it was not as successful in the clarity of that idea, brought down by its philosophical weight. Halfway through the film, the sequence is rewound, producing a film loop.

== Criticism of Hollywood ==
Throughout the 1940s and 1950s, Deren attacked Hollywood for its artistic, political and economic monopoly over American cinema. She stated, "I make my pictures for what Hollywood spends on lipstick," criticizing the amount of money spent on production. She also observed that Hollywood "has been a major obstacle to the definition and development of motion pictures as a creative fine-art form." She set herself in opposition to the Hollywood film industry's standards and practices. Deren talks about the freedoms of independent cinema:

Artistic freedom means that the amateur filmmaker is never forced to sacrifice visual drama and beauty to a stream of words...to the relentless activity and explanations of a plot...nor is the amateur production expected to return profit on a huge investment by holding the attention of a massive and motley audience for 90 minutes...Instead of trying to invent a plot that moves, use the movement of wind, or water, children, people, elevators, balls, etc. as a poem might celebrate these. And use your freedom to experiment with visual ideas; your mistakes will not get you fired.

== Haiti and Vodou ==
When Maya Deren decided to make an ethnographic film in Haiti, she was criticized for abandoning avant-garde film where she had made her name, but she was ready to expand to a new level as an artist. She had studied ethnographic footage by Gregory Bateson in Bali in 1947, and was interested in including it in her next film. In September, she divorced Hammid and left for a nine-month stay in Haiti. The Guggenheim Fellowship grant in 1946 enabled Deren to finance her travel and film footage for what would posthumously become Divine Horsemen: The Living Gods of Haiti. She went on three additional trips through 1954 to document and record the rituals of Haitian Vodou.

A source of inspiration for ritual dance was Katherine Dunham who wrote her master's thesis on Haitian dances in 1939, which Deren edited. While working as Dunham's assistant, Deren was given access to Dunham's archive which included 16mm documents on the dances in Trinidad and Haiti. Exposure to these documents led her to write her 1942 essay titled, "Religious Possession in Dancing." Afterwards, Deren wrote several articles on religious possession in dancing before her first trip to Haiti. Deren filmed, recorded and photographed many hours of Vodou ritual, but she also participated in the ceremonies. She documented her knowledge and experience of Vodou in Divine Horsemen: The Living Gods of Haiti (New York: Vanguard Press, 1953), edited by Joseph Campbell, which is considered a definitive source on the subject. She described her attraction to Vodou possession ceremonies, transformation, dance, play, games and especially ritual came from her strong feeling on the need to decenter our thoughts of self, ego and personality. In her book An Anagram of Ideas on Art, Form, and Film she wrote:

The ritualistic form treats the human being not as the source of the dramatic action, but as a somewhat depersonalized element in a dramatic whole. The intent of such depersonalization is not the destruction of the individual; on the contrary, it enlarges him beyond the personal dimension and frees him from the specializations and confines of personality. He becomes part of a dynamic whole which, like all such creative relationships, in turn, endow its parts with a measure of its larger meaning.

Deren filmed 18,000 feet of Vodou rituals and people she met in Haiti on her Bolex camera. The footage was incorporated into a posthumous documentary film Divine Horsemen: The Living Gods of Haiti, edited and produced in 1977 (with funding from Deren's friend James Merrill) by her ex-husband, Teiji Itō (1935–1982), and his wife Cherel Winett Itō (1947–1999). All of the original wire recordings, photographs and notes are held in the Maya Deren Collection at the Howard Gotlieb Archival Research Center at Boston University. The film footage is housed at Anthology Film Archives in New York City.

An LP of some of Deren's wire recordings was published by the newly formed Elektra Records in 1953 entitled Voices of Haiti. The cover art for the album was by Teiji Itō.

Anthropologists Melville J. Herskovits and Harold Courlander acknowledged the importance of Divine Horsemen, and in contemporary studies it is often cited as an authoritative voice, where Deren's methodology has been especially praised because "Vodou has resisted all orthodoxies, never mistaking surface representations for inner realities."

In her book of the same name Deren uses the spelling Voudoun, explaining: "Voudoun terminology, titles and ceremonies still make use of the original African words and in this book they have been spelled out according to usual English phonetics and so as to render, as closely as possible, the Haitian pronunciation. Most of the songs, sayings and even some of the religious terms, however, are in Creole, which is primarily French in derivation (although it also contains African, Spanish and Indian words). Where the Creole word retains its French meaning, it has been written out so as to indicate both the original French word and the distinctive Creole pronunciation." In her Glossary of Creole Words, Deren includes 'Voudoun' while the Shorter Oxford English Dictionary draws attention to the similar French word, Vaudoux.

== Death ==
Deren died in 1961, at the age of 44 from a brain hemorrhage, which has been attributed to a combination of malnutrition and pharmaceutical drug use. Her condition may have also been weakened by her long-term dependence on amphetamines and sleeping pills prescribed by Max Jacobson, a doctor and member of the arts scene, notorious for his liberal prescription of drugs, who later became famous as one of President John F. Kennedy's physicians.

== Legacy ==
Deren was an inspiration to other avant-garde filmmakers such as Curtis Harrington, Stan Brakhage, and Kenneth Anger, who emulated her independent, entrepreneurial spirit. Her influence can also be seen in films by Carolee Schneemann, Barbara Hammer, and Su Friedrich. In his review for renowned experimental filmmaker David Lynch's Inland Empire, writer Jim Emerson compares the work to Meshes of the Afternoon, apparently a favorite of Lynch's.

Deren was a key figure in the creation of a New American Cinema, highlighting personal, experimental, underground film. In 1986, the American Film Institute created the Maya Deren Award to honor independent filmmakers.

The Legend of Maya Deren, Vol. 1 Part 2 consists of hundreds of documents, interviews, oral histories, letters, and autobiographical memoirs.

Works about Deren and her works have been produced in various media:

- Glub (1947), a short film by Vancouver amateur filmmaker Stanley Fox, is a slapstick parody of Deren's early work, and is dedicated to her.
- Deren appears as a character in the long narrative poem The Changing Light at Sandover (1976–1980) by her friend James Merrill.
- In 1987, Jo Ann Kaplan directed a biographical documentary about Deren, titled Invocation: Maya Deren (65 min)
- In 1994, the UK-based Horse and Bamboo Theatre created and toured Dance of White Darkness throughout Europe—the story of Deren's visits to Haiti.
- In 2002, Martina Kudláček directed a feature-length documentary about Deren, titled In the Mirror of Maya Deren (Im Spiegel der Maya Deren), which featured music by John Zorn.

Deren's films have also been shown with newly written alternative soundtracks:

- In 2004, the British rock group Subterraneans produced new soundtracks for six of Deren's short films as part of a commission from Queen's University Belfast's annual film festival. At Land won the festival prize for sound design.
- In 2008, the Portuguese rock group Mão Morta produced new soundtracks for four of Deren's short films as part of a commission from Curtas Vila do Conde's annual film festival.

== Awards and honors ==
- Guggenheim Fellowship 1946
- Grand Prix International for Avant-garde Film at the Cannes Film Festival (1947)
- Creative Work in Motion Pictures (1947)

== Filmography ==
Key
†	Denotes posthumously released

Title	Year	Credits				Notes	Ref.
Title	Year	Director	Writer	Producer	Editor	Notes	Ref.
Meshes of the Afternoon	1943	Yes	Yes	Yes	Yes	co-directed with Alexander Hammid	
The Witch's Cradle	1944	Yes	Yes	No	No	unfinished	
At Land	1944	Yes	Yes	No	No		
A Study in Choreography for Camera	1945	Yes	No	No	No	solo starring by Talley Beatty	
The Private Life of a Cat	1947	Yes	No	No	No	Collaboration with Alexander Hammid	
Ritual in Transfigured Time	1946	Yes	Yes	Yes	Yes	co-edited by Alexander Hammid	
Meditation on Violence	1948	Yes	Yes	Yes	No	music by Teiji Itō	
Medusa	1949	Yes	No	No	No	unfinished	
Ensemble for Somnambulists	1951	Yes	Yes	Yes	No	Toronto Film Society workshop; unreleased, unfinished	
The Very Eye of Night	1955	Yes	Yes	No	Yes	collaboration with Metropolitan Opera Ballet School	
Season of Strangers	1959	Yes	No	No	No	also known as Haiku Film Project, unfinished	
Divine Horsemen: The Living Gods of Haiti	1985	Yes	No	No	No	Original footage shot by Deren (1947–1954); reconstruction by Teiji and Cherel Itō	

== Discography ==
=== Vinyl LPs ===
Year	Artist	Title	Label	Notes
1953	Maya Deren	Voices of Haiti	Elektra Records	Design [cover]: Teiji Itō; recorded during ceremonials near Croix-des-Missions and Pétion-Ville, Haiti
1978	Unknown	Meringues and Folk Ballads of Haiti	Lyrichord Discs	Recorded by Maya Deren
1980	Unknown	Divine Horsemen: The Voodoo Gods of Haiti	Lyrichord Discs	Recorded by Maya Deren; design [cover]: Teiji Itō; liner notes: Cherel Ito

== Written works ==
Deren was also an important film theorist.

- Her most widely read essay on film theory is probably An Anagram of Ideas on Art, Form and Film, Deren's seminal treatise that laid the groundwork for many of her ideas on film as an art form (Yonkers, NY: Alicat Book Shop Press, 1946).
- Her collected essays were published in 2005 and arranged in three sections:
1. Film Poetics, including: Amateur versus Professional, Cinema as an Art Form, An Anagram of Ideas on Art, Form and Film, Cinematography: The Creative Use of Reality
2. Film Production, including: Creating Movies with a New Dimension: Time, Creative Cutting, Planning by Eye, Adventures in Creative Film-Making
3. Film in Medias Res, including: A Letter, Magic is New, New Directions in Film Art, Choreography for the Camera, Ritual in Transfigured Time, Meditation on Violence, The Very Eye of Night.
- Divine Horsemen: Living Gods of Haiti was published in 1953 by Vanguard Press (New York City) and Thames & Hudson (London), republished under the title of The Voodoo Gods by Paladin in 1975, and again under its original title by McPherson & Company in 1998.

== See also ==
- List of Guggenheim Fellowships awarded in 1946
- Women's cinema

== Works cited ==
- Brody, Richard (November 16, 2022). "How Maya Deren Became the Symbol and Champion of American Experimental Film". The New Yorker. Retrieved March 21, 2023.
- Deren, Maya. Edited by Bruce R. McPherson. New York: McPherson & Company, 2005.
- Keller, Sarah. "Frustrated Climaxes: On Maya Deren’s Meshes of the Afternoon and Witch’s Cradle." Cinema Journal 52, no. 3 (Spring 2013): 75-98.
- Nichols, Bill, ed. Maya Deren and the American Avant-Garde. Berkeley and Los Angeles, California: University of California Press, 2001.
- Soussloff, Catherine M. (2001). "Maya Deren Herself". In Nichols, Bill (ed.). Maya Deren and the American Avant-Garde. University of California Press. ISBN 0520227328.
