= Verna Fields =

American film editor and entertainment industry executive

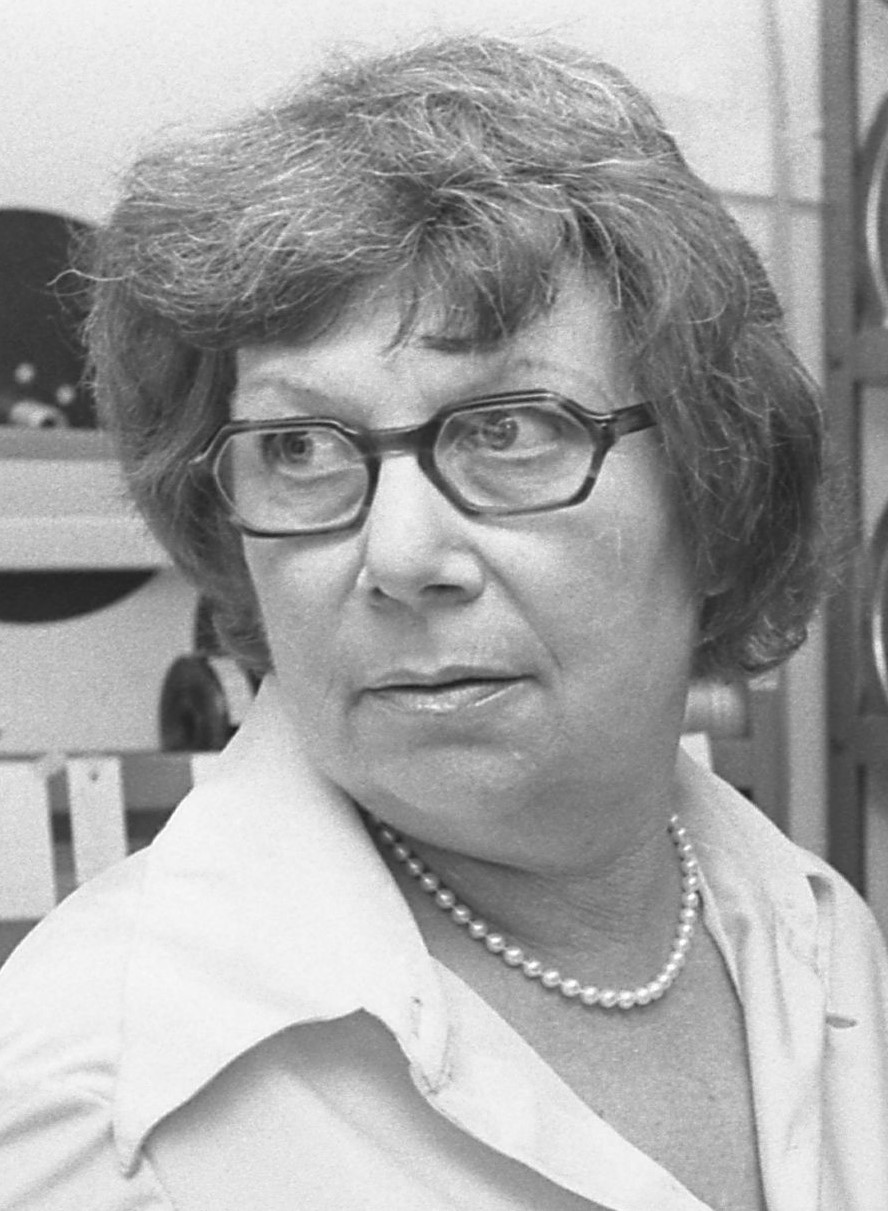
- Fields in 1975
- Born: Verna Hellman; March 21, 1918; St. Louis, Missouri, U.S.
- Died: November 30, 1982 (aged 64); Los Angeles, California, U.S.
- Occupations: Film editor Sound editor
- Years active: 1954–1975
- Spouse: Sam Fields (m. 1946; died 1954)
- Children: 2
- Awards: Golden Reel; 1962 El Cid; Academy Award for Best Film Editing; 1975 Jaws; ACE Eddie; 1975 Jaws; Women in Film Crystal Awards; 1981 Crystal Award

Verna Fields (née Hellman; March 21, 1918 – November 30, 1982) was an American film editor, film and television sound editor, educator, and entertainment industry executive. In the first phase of her career, from 1954 through to about 1970, Fields mostly worked on smaller projects that gained little recognition. She was the sound editor for several television shows in the 1950s. She worked on independent films including The Savage Eye (1959), on government-supported documentaries of the 1960s, and on some minor studio films such as Peter Bogdanovich's first film, Targets (1968). For several years in the late 1960s, she was a film instructor at the University of Southern California. Her one major studio film, El Cid (1961), led to her only industry recognition in this phase of her career, which was the 1962 Golden Reel award for sound editing.

Fields came into prominence as a film editor and industry executive during the 'New Hollywood' era (1968–1982). She had established close ties with the directors Peter Bogdanovich, George Lucas, and Steven Spielberg early in their careers, and became known as their "mother cutter"; the term "cutter" is an informal variation of "film editor". The critical and commercial success of the films What's Up, Doc? (1972), American Graffiti (1973), and Jaws (1975) brought Fields a level of recognition that was unique among film editors at the time. Jaws in particular was enormously and unexpectedly profitable, and was part of the wave of films that ushered in the era of the "summer blockbuster". Fields' contributions to this success were widely acknowledged. She received an Academy Award and an American Cinema Editors Award for best editing for the film. Within a year of the film's release, she had been appointed as Vice-President for Feature Production at Universal Pictures. She was thus among the first women to enter upper-level management in the entertainment industry. Her career as an executive at Universal continued until her death in 1982 at age 64.

== Early life, education, and training ==
Verna Hellman was born in St. Louis, Missouri. She was the daughter of Selma (née Schwartz) and Samuel Hellman, who was then working as a journalist for the St. Louis Post-Dispatch and the Saturday Evening Post. Sam Hellman subsequently moved his family to Hollywood, where he became a prolific screenwriter.

Verna Hellman graduated from the University of Southern California with a B.A. in journalism. She then held several positions at 20th Century Fox, including being the assistant sound editor on Fritz Lang's film The Woman in the Window (1944). In 1946, she married the film editor Sam Fields and stopped working. The Fieldses had two sons; one of them, Richard Fields, became a film editor. In 1954, Sam Fields died of a heart attack at the age of 38.

== Career in sound editing ==
After her husband died, Fields began a career as a television sound editor working on such shows as Death Valley Days and the children's programs Sky King and Fury. She installed a film editing lab in her home so that she could work at night while her children were young; she told them that she was the "Queen of Saturday morning".

By 1956, she was working on films as well. Her first credit as a sound editor was for Fritz Lang's While the City Sleeps (1956). She worked on the experimental documentary The Savage Eye (1959); the co-directors Ben Maddow, Sidney Meyers, and Joseph Strick and the other connections she made on this film were important to her subsequent career. In 1962 Fields won the Motion Picture Sound Editors' Golden Reel Award for the film El Cid (directed by Anthony Mann).

Following El Cid (1961), Fields was the sound editor on several lesser-known films, including the experimental film The Balcony (1963) with her Savage Eye colleagues Strick and Maddow. Peter Bogdanovich's first, low-budget film Targets (1968) was one of her last sound-editing projects, and represents her mature work. Bill Warren has described the scene in which the character Bobby starts sniping at freeway drivers from the top of a large oil storage tank: "The sound is mono, and brilliantly mixed – the entire sequence of Bobby shooting from the tanks was shot without sound. Verna Fields, then a sound editor, added all the sound effects. The result is seamlessly realistic, from the scrape of the guns on the metal of the tanks, to the crack of the rifles, to the little gasps Bobby makes just before firing."

== Film editing and teaching ==
Fields' career as a film editor commenced when the director Irving Lerner recruited her to be the editor of the film Studs Lonigan (1960); Fields and Lerner had both worked on The Savage Eye. In 1963, she edited An Affair of the Skin, which was directed by Ben Maddow (another Savage Eye contact). Over the next five years, Fields edited several other independent films, but her best known work was on the Disney film The Legend of the Boy and the Eagle (1967). She also made documentaries funded by the United States government through the Office of Economic Opportunity (OEO), the United States Information Agency (USIA), and the U.S. Department of Health, Education, and Welfare (HEW).

Starting in the mid-1960s, Fields taught film editing at the University of Southern California (USC). Douglas Gomery wrote of her time at USC that:

Her greatest impact came when she began to teach film editing to a generation of students at the University of Southern California. She then operated on the fringes of the film business, for a time making documentaries for the Office of Economic Opportunity. The end of that Federal Agency pushed her back into mainstream Hollywood then being overrun by her former USC students.

Fields' students had included Matthew Robbins, Willard Huyck, Gloria Katz, John Milius and George Lucas.

Fields left no written lectures from her USC years, but a transcript exists from a 1975 seminar that she gave at the American Film Institute. In one characteristic excerpt she said that, "There's a feeling of movement in telling a story and there is a flow. A cut that is off-rhythm will be disturbing and you will feel it, unless you want it to be like that. On Jaws, each time I wanted to cut I didn't, so that it would have an anticipatory feeling — and it worked."

In 1971, Peter Bogdanovich, with whom Fields had worked on Targets, recruited her to edit What's Up, Doc? (1972); Bogdanovich had edited his previous films himself. The film was very successful, and is now considered as the second of Bogdanovich's 'golden period' that commenced with The Last Picture Show (1971).

What's Up, Doc? established Fields as an editor on studio films. She subsequently edited Bogdanovich's final golden period film, Paper Moon (1973), as well as his less successful film Daisy Miller (1974).

== George Lucas and American Graffiti ==
In 1967, Fields had hired George Lucas to help edit Journey to the Pacific (1968), which was a documentary film written and directed by Gary Goldsmith for the USIA. She had also hired Marcia Griffin for the job, and introduced Griffin and George Lucas; the couple subsequently married. In 1972, Lucas was directing American Graffiti. While Lucas had intended that his wife would edit the film, Universal asked him to add Verna Fields to the editing team. Over the first ten weeks of post-production, George and Marcia Lucas, along with Fields and Walter Murch (as sound editor), pieced together the original, 165-minute version of the film. Each of more than 40 scenes in the film had a continuously playing background song, with songs that had been popular around 1962, when the film's story was set. Michael Sragow has characterized the effect as "using rock 'n roll as a Greek chorus with a beat".

Fields then left American Graffiti. It took another six months of editing to create a shorter, 110-minute version of the film, but upon its release in 1973 American Graffiti was extremely successful both with critics and at the box office. Shortly after its release, Roger Greenspun described the film and its editing: "American Graffiti exists not so much in its individual stories as in its orchestration of many stories, its sense of time and place. Although it is full of the material of fashionable nostalgia, it never exploits nostalgia. In its feeling for movement and music and the vitality of the night—and even in its vision in white—it is oddly closer to some early Fellini than to the recent American past of, say, The Last Picture Show or Summer of '42."

Verna Fields and Marcia Lucas were nominated for an Academy Award for Film Editing in 1974 for their work on American Graffiti; while the film won no Academy Awards, Marcia Lucas, Murch, and Fields all won Academy Awards for later work.

== Steven Spielberg and Jaws ==
Fields edited Steven Spielberg's first major film, The Sugarland Express (1974). She became widely celebrated for her work as the film editor on Spielberg's next film, Jaws (1975), for which she won both the Academy Award for Film Editing and the American Cinema Editors Eddie Award in 1976. Leonard Maltin has characterized her editing as "sensational". Gerald Peary, who interviewed Fields in 1980, wrote that, "Jaws scared the world, brought in a fortune for Universal, and made Verna Fields, who won an Academy Award, about as famous 'overnight' as an editor ever gets." He then quoted Fields as saying that, "Steven told me it was because I had cut the first picture that was a monumental success in which you can really see the editing. And people discovered that it was a woman who edited Jaws."

The editing of Jaws has been intensely studied for over thirty years. In film editor Susan Korda's 2005 lecture, "We'll Fix It in the Edit!?", at the Berlinale Talent Campus, she broadly explained the contribution of editing to the film: "What is fascinating in Jaws is that the shark has a personality, the shark has an intelligence, indeed sometimes I think the shark has a sense of humor, morbid as it might be. And that was all achieved in the first two acts of the film before you see the shark. So the cutting was very essential for that." David Bordwell has used the second shark attack scene in Jaws as (literally) a textbook illustration of an editing innovation that occurred in the late 1960s. The innovation, which Fields herself named the "wipe by cut", can be used when a character is filmed from a distance using a telephoto lens. The cut to a different framing of the character occurs during the interruption by a figure who passes between the camera and the character. The cut thus masks itself, and avoids drawing the viewer's attention away from the narrative of the scene.

The critic David Edelstein's affectionate comments on Jaws and its editing are also a good indication of the film's lasting influence 30 years after its release:

Jaws is still one of my favorite movies. I didn't know I could be manipulated like that—so wittily, so teasingly, in a way that made me laugh at my own fear. (The only Hitchcock film I'd seen in a theater was Frenzy, which was too sick to appreciate in the same vein.) What clinched it was that unbelievably brilliant sequence that begins with a high-angle shot of Roy Scheider dropping fish entrails in the water as shark bait. He was resentful; he said to Shaw and Dreyfuss, "Why don't you guys come down here and shovel some of this shit?" And we started to laugh—he said "shit!" heh-heh—and then the head of the shark appeared in the water (no music, no foreshadowing), and I felt my mind detach from my body and my laugh turn into a shriek and merge into the collective shriek of everyone in that huge theater. I literally shook for the rest of the movie: Every cut by the late Verna Fields had me poised to leap out of my seat. (I really learned to appreciate editing from Jaws.)

On a 2012 listing of the 75 best edited films of all time that was compiled by the Motion Picture Editors Guild, Jaws was listed eighth.

== Management for Universal Studios ==
Shortly after the completion of Jaws in 1975, Fields was hired by Universal as an executive consultant. Some insight into Universal's reasons for hiring her can be gleaned from the fact that during the filming of Jaws, in addition to her editing, Fields had been "omnipresent...at Spielberg's beck and call by means of a walkie-talkie. Often she would shuttle back and forth on her bike between the producers in town and Spielberg at the dock for last-minute decisions". The producers of Jaws were David Brown and Richard D. Zanuck. Along with Brown, Zanuck, and Peter Benchley (the book's author), Fields helped promote Jaws on the "talk show circuit" in the eight months before its saturation release to 464 theaters on June 20, 1975. Fields had plainly earned the confidence of the producers and of the studio executives at Universal.

Throughout her career, Fields had worked independently, but in 1976, and following the unexpected success of Jaws, she accepted a position as the Feature-Production Vice-President with Universal. She was thus among the first women to hold high executive positions with the major studios. In a 1982 interview, Fields was quoted as saying, "I got a lot of credit for Jaws, rightly or wrongly."

Fields had come "up from the cutting room floor" and out of the customary, near-anonymity of film editors. Regarding this change in her career path, Fields told Peary in 1980 that "All these young filmmakers are possessive. They feel I belong to them, and they feel a certain resentment - that I went to the other side. In calmer moments, of course, they know it isn't true, that I can do more for them now." Of Fields' work at Universal, Joel Schumacher was quoted in 1982 as saying: "In the record business, you have Berry Gordy and Ahmet Ertegün. They're executives who actually made records. In the movie business, as an executive who's worked with film, you have only Verna. She saves Universal a fortune...every day."

== Later life and death ==
In 1981, she was awarded the Women in Film Crystal Award for outstanding women who, through their endurance and the excellence of their work, have helped to expand the role of women within the entertainment industry.

Fields held her position as a vice president at Universal until her death in 1982. Jaws was the last film that she edited. There had apparently been some discussion that Fields might edit Spielberg's Close Encounters of the Third Kind (1977), but Michael Kahn took responsibility, and edited all but one of Spielberg's films for the next 30 years. After John D. Hancock, the initial director of Jaws 2, was sacked, it was suggested that Fields co-direct it with Joe Alves. Jeannot Szwarc, a Fields' protégé, was hired to complete the film.

Fields died of cancer in Los Angeles, California on November 30, 1982. She was 64 years old. In her honor, Universal named a building at its Universal City, California lot the Verna Fields Building; it lies immediately across from the Alfred Hitchcock Building. The Motion Picture Sound Editors (MPSE) sponsor an annual Verna Fields Award for Student Sound Editing. The Women in Film Foundation, which honored Fields with its Crystal Award in 1981, presently administers the Verna Fields Memorial Fellowship for women film students at UCLA.

== Selected filmography (editor) ==
Year	Film	Director	Other notes
1975	Jaws	Steven Spielberg	Best Editing Oscar
1974	Memory of Us	H. Kaye Dyal	
1974	Daisy Miller	Peter Bogdanovich	
1974	The Sugarland Express	Steven Spielberg	
1973	American Graffiti	George Lucas	Best Editing Oscar nomination (with Marcia Lucas)
1973	Paper Moon	Peter Bogdanovich	
1973	Sing a Country Song	Jack McCallum	
1972	What's Up, Doc?	Peter Bogdanovich	
1969	Medium Cool	Haskell Wexler	Paul Golding is credited as editorial consultant.
