= Conrad Hall =

American cinematographer (1926–2003)

Conrad L. Hall
- On the set of Jennifer 8 (1992)
- Born: Conrad Lafcadio Hall; June 21, 1926; Papeete, Tahiti, French Polynesia
- Died: January 4, 2003 (aged 76); Santa Monica, California, U.S.
- Other name: 'Connie'
- Education: USC School of Cinematic Arts
- Occupation: Cinematographer
- Years active: 1949–2003
- Spouses: Virginia Schwartz (m. 1952; div. 1969); Katharine Ross (m. 1969; div. 1974); Susan Kowarsh-Hall (before 2003)
- Children: 3, including Conrad W. Hall
- Father: James Norman Hall
- Awards: Full list

Conrad Lafcadio Hall, ASC (June 21, 1926 – January 4, 2003) was a French Polynesian-born American cinematographer. He became widely prominent as a director of photography beginning in the 1960s, earning numerous accolades including three Academy Awards (out of 10 total nominations), three BAFTA Awards and five American Society of Cinematographers Awards.

Hall won three Oscars for Best Cinematography for his work on Butch Cassidy and the Sundance Kid (1969), American Beauty (1999), and Road to Perdition (2002). He was also Oscar-nominated for Morituri (1965), The Professionals (1966), In Cold Blood (1967), The Day of the Locust (1975), Tequila Sunrise (1988), Searching for Bobby Fischer (1993), and A Civil Action (1998). He is also known for Cool Hand Luke (1967), Fat City (1972), Electra Glide in Blue (1973) and Marathon Man (1976).

In 2003, Hall was judged to be one of history's ten most influential cinematographers in a survey of the members of the International Cinematographers Guild. He has been given a star on the Hollywood Walk of Fame.

== Early life and education ==
Conrad L Hall was born on June 21, 1926, in Papeete, Tahiti, French Polynesia. He was named after writers Joseph Conrad and Lafcadio Hearn. His father was James Norman Hall, an ace pilot and captain in the Lafayette Escadrille that fought for France in World War I. James also co-wrote the 1932 novel Mutiny on the Bounty. His mother was Sarah ("Lala") Winchester Hall, who was half Polynesian. Growing up during the relative infancy of cinema, Hall never was around cameras, and the idea of going to the movies was a foreign concept. In his early-mid teens, Hall attended Cate School, a boarding preparatory school near Santa Barbara, California.

After graduating, Hall was told by his father to find his path in life. Hall attended the University of Southern California, intending to study journalism, but ended up doing poorly and instead went to USC's School of Cinema-Television (now the USC School of Cinematic Arts). He wasn't sure this was the right decision, but that since this was a new art form it would be interesting to start from the bottom. Hall attended the School of Cinema at a time when Slavko Vorkapić was the head of the program; Hall later recalled that “He taught me that film-making was a new visual language. He taught the principles, and left the rest up to us”. After creating his first shots in school he fell in love with the art and wanted to continue telling his stories through imagery. A few people that visited the school during his education included John Huston and Orson Welles. After graduation in 1949, Hall expected to get a job right out of college. At the time, however, Hollywood only allowed the camera crew to be filled with people that were on the International Photographers Guild roster.

== Career ==
=== 1949–1966 ===
After graduation Hall collaborated with his classmates, Marvin R. Weinstein and Jack C. Couffer, to create Canyon Films in 1949. In the beginning they made advertising commercials and documentaries and did pickup shots for features. In 1956 Canyon Films acquired a short film, My Brother Down There, which allowed Hall to enter into the cameraman position and become part of the International Photographers Guild. However, the Guild made Canyon Films hire an established Guild Cameraman for My Brother Down There, denying Hall credit, even though he shot the entire film. Instead he was credited as the visual consultant, after United Artists released the film under the new title Running Target.

Once Running Target was finished Canyon Films dissolved, and its members went off on their own paths. Since Hall was part of the Guild, he was able to work as an assistant cameraman at the side of many influential cinematographers such as Hall Mohr, Ernie Haller, Burnie Guffey and Ted McCord, who were all part of the ASC. Following a year of working as an assistant cameraman, he was awarded the chance to be the camera operator on the television series Stoney Burke. In 1963, he began filming another television series called The Outer Limits. Then, in 1964, he shot his first feature-length black and white film, Wild Seed, which was made in roughly 24 days with producer Albert S. Ruddy.

Hall's breakthrough came with Morituri in 1965, for which he received his first Oscar nomination. In the following year Hall shot Incubus, The Professionals, and Harper, which was his first color film. His first collaboration with director Richard Brooks on The Professionals was put in motion by assistant director Tom Shaw, who worked with Hall on Wild Seed and recommended him to Brooks; the work resulted in his second Oscar nomination.

=== 1967–1976 ===
Their second collaboration, 1967's In Cold Blood, resulted in yet another Oscar nomination. It is notable for the documentary feel and location shots, which were rare at the time. In that same year, Hall shot Cool Hand Luke and Divorce American Style. Cool Hand Luke is known for being shot in Panavision, which contributed to its lush color palette. In 1968, Hall filmed Hell in the Pacific for director John Boorman, which was not a box-office success but has since become a cult classic.

In 1969, Hall received his first Oscar for Butch Cassidy and the Sundance Kid. To make Butch Cassidy visually compatible with the time period, he used experimental techniques, such as overexposing the negatives in order to mute the primary colors when printing it back (Hunter, 2003). The result was considered an innovative success. He made two other films that year, The Happy Ending and Tell them Willie Boy is Here. In 1972, Hall shot Fat City, with director John Huston. Fat City was known for its grainy texture to reflect the harsh reality of the storyline. In 1973 he shot the police thriller Electra Glide in Blue, followed by Smile and The Day of the Locust in 1975, the latter of which earned him his fifth Oscar nomination. In 1976 he shot Marathon Man with director John Schlesinger which was one of the first to use the Steadicam technique (although it was not the first to be released).

=== 1987–2002 ===
After shooting 18 films in 12 years, Hall took an 11-year break. Around the same time he teamed up with noted cinematographer Haskell Wexler to make a commercial production company (Vinson, 1987). This allowed him to not only be the cameraman on his own work, but also the director. The break for him was about understanding and learning from others about their unique techniques. As Hall stated: "At heart I am more than a cinematographer. I'm a filmmaker." This led to his exploration of writing, such as an adaptation of the novel The Wild Palms.

Hall returned to the film industry in 1987 to shoot Black Widow. In 1988, Hall became part of the union crew for Tequila Sunrise after a few complications. His work resulted in a sixth Oscar nomination. Also in 1988, the ASC gave Hall an outstanding achievement award. After his work on Tequila Sunrise, he picked up his old pace, making Class Action (1991), Jennifer 8 (1992), Searching for Bobby Fischer (1993) and Love Affair (1994) one after the other. Searching for Bobby Fischer received an Oscar nomination for cinematography, his seventh.

In 1994, Hall was honored with the lifetime achievement award from the American Society of Cinematographers. In 1998, he shot Without Limits and was Oscar nominated for A Civil Action, followed by his second win for American Beauty in 1999. American Beauty, his first collaboration with director Sam Mendes, highlighted his "unique use of the hand-held camera to capture the film's heightened reality and almost dream-like atmosphere". His final film was Road to Perdition in 2002, a second collaboration with Mendes, for which he was posthumously awarded another Academy Award. In total, he won three Oscars throughout his 50-year career.

== Personal life ==
Hall married Virginia Schwartz in 1952. They had three children, Conrad W. Hall, Kate Hall-Feist and Naia Hall-West, before they divorced in 1969. Hall met actress Katharine Ross on the set of Butch Cassidy and the Sundance Kid and became her third of five husbands in 1969. Hall and Ross separated in 1973, finalizing their divorce in 1975 so that she could marry her fourth husband. His third marriage was to costume designer Susan Kowarsh-Hall, whom he worked with on Road to Perdition (2002), from an unknown date until his death.

=== Death ===
Hall died from bladder cancer at Santa Monica Hospital on January 4, 2003, at the age of 76. His Oscar for Road to Perdition (2002), which is dedicated to Hall, was posthumously accepted by his son Conrad W. Hall, also a cinematographer.

For his contributions to motion pictures, Hall posthumously received a star on the Hollywood Walk of Fame on May 1, 2003.

Hall was and still is affectionately referred to as "Connie" by his peers and associates.

== Filmography ==
=== Feature films ===
Screenwriter

- Running Target (1956)

Cinematographer

Year	Title	Director	Notes
1958	Edge of Fury	Robert J. Gurney Jr. Irving Lerner	Shared credit with Jack Couffer and Marvin R. Weinstein
1965	Wild Seed	Brian G. Hutton	
1965	Morituri	Bernhard Wicki	
1966	Harper	Jack Smight	
1966	Incubus	Leslie Stevens	
1966	The Professionals	Richard Brooks	
1967	Divorce American Style	Bud Yorkin	
1967	Cool Hand Luke	Stuart Rosenberg	
1967	In Cold Blood	Richard Brooks	
1968	Hell in the Pacific	John Boorman	
1968	Rogue's Gallery	Leonard Horn	
1969	Trilogy	Frank Perry	Segment: "A Christmas Memory"; Shared credit with Jordan Cronenweth and Vincent Saizis; Originally produced as episode of ABC Stage 67
1969	Butch Cassidy and the Sundance Kid	George Roy Hill	
1969	Tell Them Willie Boy Is Here	Abraham Polonsky	
1969	The Happy Ending	Richard Brooks	
1972	Fat City	John Huston	
1973	Electra Glide in Blue	James William Guercio	
1974	Catch My Soul	Patrick McGoohan	
1975	Smile	Michael Ritchie	
1975	The Day of the Locust	John Schlesinger	
1976	Marathon Man	John Schlesinger	
1987	Black Widow	Bob Rafelson	
1988	Tequila Sunrise	Robert Towne	
1991	Class Action	Michael Apted	
1992	Jennifer 8	Bruce Robinson	
1993	Searching for Bobby Fischer	Steven Zaillian	
1994	Love Affair	Glenn Gordon Caron	
1996	Faithful	Paul Mazursky	Uncredited
1998	Without Limits	Robert Towne	
1998	A Civil Action	Steven Zaillian	
1999	American Beauty	Sam Mendes	
2002	Road to Perdition	Sam Mendes	

=== Short films ===
Year	Title	Director	Notes
1960	Islands of the Sea	Ben Sharpsteen	Documentary short
1977	Plymouth Fury	Haskell Wexler	With Wexler
1991	Sharkskin	Dan Perri	

=== Television ===
Year	Title	Notes
1963	Stoney Burke	10 episodes
1963–64	The Outer Limits	15 episodes
1966	ABC Stage 67	Episode: "A Christmas Memory"

TV movies and miniseries

Year	Title	Director	Notes
1964	The Unknown	Gerd Oswald	
1964	Fanfare for a Death Scene	Leslie Stevens	Shared credit with Monroe P. Askins
1964	The Ghost of Sierra de Cobre	Joseph Stefano	
1977	It Happened One Christmas	Donald Wrye	

== Awards and nominations ==
Award	Wins	Nominations
Academy Awards	3	7
BAFTA Film Awards	3	N/A
ASC Awards	5	1
Satellite Awards	1	1

=== Academy Awards ===
Year	Category	Work	Result
1966	Best Cinematography, Black-and-White	Morituri	Nominated
1967	Best Cinematography, Color	The Professionals	Nominated
1968	Best Cinematography	In Cold Blood	Nominated
1970	Best Cinematography	Butch Cassidy and the Sundance Kid	Won
1976	Best Cinematography	The Day of the Locust	Nominated
1989	Best Cinematography	Tequila Sunrise	Nominated
1994	Best Cinematography	Searching for Bobby Fischer	Nominated
1999	Best Cinematography	A Civil Action	Nominated
2000	Best Cinematography	American Beauty	Won
2003	Best Cinematography	Road to Perdition (posthumous)	Won

=== BAFTA Awards ===
Year	Category	Work	Result
1971	Best Cinematography	Butch Cassidy and the Sundance Kid	Won
2000	Best Cinematography	American Beauty	Won
2003	Best Cinematography	Road to Perdition (posthumous)	Won

=== American Society of Cinematographers ===
Year	Category	Work	Result
1989	Outstanding Achievement in Cinematography in Theatrical Releases	Tequila Sunrise	Won
1994	Outstanding Achievement in Cinematography in Theatrical Releases	Searching for Bobby Fischer	Won
1994	Lifetime Achievement Award	—N/a	Won
1995	Outstanding Achievement in Cinematography in Theatrical Releases	Love Affair	Nominated
2000	Outstanding Achievement in Cinematography in Theatrical Releases	American Beauty	Won
2003	Outstanding Achievement in Cinematography in Theatrical Releases	Road to Perdition (posthumous)	Won

=== British Society of Cinematographers ===
Year	Category	Work	Result
1976	Best Cinematography in a Theatrical Feature Film	Marathon Man	Nominated
2000	Best Cinematography in a Theatrical Feature Film	American Beauty	Won
2002	Best Cinematography in a Theatrical Feature Film	Road to Perdition	Won

=== Camerimage Festival ===
Institution	Year	Category	Work	Result
Camerimage Festival	1994	Golden Frog	Searching for Bobby Fischer	Nominated
Camerimage Festival	1994	Bronze Frog	Searching for Bobby Fischer	Won
Camerimage Festival	1995	Lifetime Achievement Award	—N/a	Won
Camerimage Festival	2002	Golden Frog	Road to Perdition	Won

=== Satellite Awards ===
Year	Category	Work	Result
1999	Best Cinematography	American Beauty	Nominated
2002	Best Cinematography	Road to Perdition (posthumous)	Won

=== Critics awards ===
Institution	Year	Category	Work	Result
Boston Society of Film Critics	2002	Best Cinematography	Road to Perdition	2nd place
Chicago Film Critics Association	2000	Best Cinematography	American Beauty	Nominated
Chicago Film Critics Association	2003	Best Cinematography	Road to Perdition	Nominated
Dallas–Fort Worth Film Critics Association	2002	Best Cinematography	Road to Perdition	Won
Las Vegas Film Critics Society	2000	Best Cinematography	American Beauty	Nominated
Las Vegas Film Critics Society	2002	Best Cinematography	Road to Perdition	Won
Los Angeles Film Critics Association	1999	Best Cinematography	American Beauty	2nd place
Los Angeles Film Critics Association	2000	Career Achievement Award	—N/a	Won
Los Angeles Film Critics Association	2002	Best Cinematography	Road to Perdition	2nd place
National Board of Review	2002	Career Achievement Award	—N/a	Won
National Society of Film Critics	1968	Best Cinematography	Cool Hand Luke, In Cold Blood	2nd place
National Society of Film Critics	1989	Best Cinematography	Tequila Sunrise	3rd place
National Society of Film Critics	2000	Best Cinematography	American Beauty	Won
New York Film Critics Circle	2002	Best Cinematographer	Road to Perdition	3rd place
Online Film Critics Society	1999	Best Cinematography	American Beauty	Nominated
Online Film Critics Society	2002	Best Cinematography	Road to Perdition	Nominated
Phoenix Film Critics Society	2003	Best Cinematography	Road to Perdition (posthumous)	Nominated
San Diego Film Critics Society	2002	Best Cinematography	Road to Perdition	Won

=== Other accolades ===
Institution	Year	Category	Work	Result
Festival du Film Policier de Cognac	1993	Jury "Coup de Chapeau"	Jennifer 8	Won
Gold Derby Awards	2002	Best Cinematography	Road to Perdition	Nominated
Ojai Film Festival	2002	Lifetime Achievement Award	—N/a	Won
