= Films Beget Films =

1964 book by Jay Leyda

- Author: Jay Leyda
- Language: English
- Genre: Non-fiction
- Publisher: George Allen & Unwin
- Publication date: 1964
- Publication place: United Kingdom

Films Beget Films is a 1964 book written by Jay Leyda. It traces the history of compilation films constructed using found newsreel footage. He argues that documentary film is linked at an early stage to this newsreel footage.

== Leyda's timeline ==
Early 20th century

- Newsreel footage of various events are compiled into showreels.

1920s

- Esfir Shub re-edits newsreel stock footage according to the principles of Soviet montage theory.
- Hans Richter makes his 'film essays'.

World War II

- Enemy footage is re-edited to make propaganda films, for example Frank Capra's Why We Fight.
- Len Lye and Alberto Cavalcanti make technical innovations.

Post-war

- Footage of the Holocaust is made into compilation films shown at the Nuremberg Trials.
- Resnais's Night and Fog also uses Holocaust footage.
