= A Year in Upper Felicity =

1973 book by Jack Chen

A Year in Upper Felicity: Life in a Chinese Village During the Cultural Revolution is a book written and illustrated by the Communist (see biography) journalist and author Jack Chen. Published in May 1973, the book chronicles a year spent in a rural Chinese village (Upper Felicity) during the Cultural Revolution. It was based upon the author's stay in the village during 1969–1970.

Jack Chen is the son of the Chinese Trinidadian lawyer and Republican-era Chinese foreign minister Eugene Chen and his French-Creole wife Aisy.

The book is organized around the four seasons. It describes the day-to-day life of rural Chinese peasants, and how city dwellers (such as the author) were sent to live and work with peasants to further the supposed imminent Socialist revolution that dominated Chinese politics in the 1960s.

Jack Chen wrote a number of other books about life in China, including:

- Chen, Jack (1957). New earth. Southern Illinois University Press. – "Until now, very little firsthand information about Communist China has been available in this country. Of extraordinary importance, therefore, is this story of an early collective farm in East China’s Chekiang Province in the 1949–56 period."
- Chen, Jack (1975). Inside the cultural revolution. Macmillan. – "Here he gives a favorable recapitulation of the Cultural Revolution, written in a mixture of dry academese and Maoist jargon."
- Chen, Jack (1990). The Chinese of America. Harper & Row. – "Examines the events that led to the Tian'anmen Square massacre, discusses religious freedom in China, and speculates on whether a Chinese democracy could survive."
