= Helen Levitt =

American photographer (1913–2009)

- Self-portrait, 1963
- Born: August 31, 1913; Brooklyn, New York City, U.S.
- Died: March 29, 2009 (aged 95); New York City, U.S.
- Occupation: Photographer
- Known for: Street photography
- Awards: International Photography Hall of Fame

Cover art for Levitt's book Crosstown (2002)

Cover art for Levitt's book Slide Show (2005)

Helen Levitt (August 31, 1913 – March 29, 2009) was an American photographer and cinematographer. She was particularly noted for her street photography around New York City. David Levi Strauss described her as "the most celebrated and least known photographer of her time."

== Early life and education ==
Levitt was born in Bensonhurst, Brooklyn, New York, the daughter of May (Kane), and Sam Levitt. Her father and maternal grandparents were Russian Jewish immigrants. She went to New Utrecht High School but dropped out in 1931.

== Work in photography ==
She began photography when she was eighteen and began working for J. Florian Mitchell, a commercial portrait photographer in the Bronx, where she learned how to develop photos in the darkroom. She also attended many classes and events hosted by the Manhattan Film and Photography League, and got acquainted with the work of Henri Cartier-Bresson at the Julien Levy Gallery, who she was able to meet through the league. His work became a major influence for her photography as it inspired her to change from her more journalistic and commercial approach to photography to a more personal one.

In 1936, she purchased a 35 mm rangefinder camera. While teaching art classes to children in 1937 for New York City's Federal Art Project, Levitt became intrigued with the transitory chalk drawings that were part of the New York children's street culture of the time. She began to photograph these chalk drawings, as well as the children who made them for her own creative assignment with the Federal Art Project. They were ultimately published in 1987 as In the Street: Chalk Drawings and Messages, New York City 1938–1948.

She continued taking street photographs in Manhattan, mainly in Spanish Harlem but also in the Garment District and on the Lower East Side. During the 1930s to 1940s, the lack of air conditioning meant people were outside more, which invested her in street photography. Her work was first published in Fortune magazine's July 1939 issue. The new photography section of the Museum of Modern Art, New York included Levitt's work in its inaugural exhibition in July 1939. In 1941, she visited Mexico City with Alma Mailman, then wife of author James Agee, and took photos in the streets of Tacubaya, a working-class suburb. In 1943, Nancy Newhall curated her first solo exhibition Helen Levitt: Photographs of Children with photographs from Harlem and Mexico City.

In 1959 and 1960, she received two grants from the Guggenheim Foundation for her pioneering work in color photography. In 1965 she published her first major collection, A Way of Seeing. Much of her work in color from 1959 to 1960 was stolen in a 1970 burglary of her East 12th Street apartment. The remaining photos, and others taken in the following years, can be seen in the 2005 book Slide Show: The Color Photographs of Helen Levitt. A second solo exhibit, Projects: Helen Levitt in Color, was held at the Museum of Modern Art, New York in 1974. Her next major shows were in the 1960s; Amanda Hopkinson suggests that this second wave of recognition was related to the feminist rediscovery of women's creative achievements. In 1976, she was a Photography Fellow of the National Endowment for the Arts.

Levitt lived in New York City and remained active as a photographer for nearly 70 years. However, she expressed lament at the change of New York City scenery: "I go where there's a lot of activity. Children used to be outside. Now the streets are empty. People are indoors looking at television or something."

== Work in film making ==
Short film, In the Street (1948)

During WWII, Levitt served as assistant film editor at the Office of Inter-American Affairs, producer-editor of stock footage film Here Is China (1940), and as assistant film editor at the Office of War Information Overseas Branch in New York City 1944–45.

In the late 1940s, Levitt made two documentary films with Janice Loeb and James Agee: In the Street (1948) and The Quiet One (1948). Levitt, along with Loeb and Sidney Meyers, received an Academy Award nomination for The Quiet One.

Another Light (1952) is dramatized documentary about a small town and its new hospital, focusing on the reactions of an elderly farmer, a housewife, and a businessman. The film explains how town citizens in Ridgewood, NJ, raised construction funds, and how the hospital supports and serves the community. Presented by the Federal Security Agency's Public Health Service, the film was produced by William Levitt, written by William B. Mahoney, camera by Richard Leacock, co-edited by Levitt and Loeb, and directed by Levitt.

Made by Film Documents Productions.Levitt was active in film making for nearly 25 years; her final film credit is as an editor for John Cohen's documentary The End of an Old Song (1972). Levitt's other film credits include the cinematography on The Savage Eye (1960), which was produced by Ben Maddow, Meyers, and Joseph Strick, and also as an assistant director for Strick and Maddow's film version of Genet's play The Balcony (1963). In her 1991 biographical essay, Maria Hambourg wrote that Levitt "has all but disinherited this part of her work." In 2012 Deane Williams published a comprehensive overview of Levitt's films in Senses of Cinema.

== Style and themes ==
Helen Levitt was most well known and celebrated for her work taking pictures of children playing in the streets. She also focused her work in areas of Harlem and the Lower East side with minority populations. There is a constant motif of children playing games in her work. She stepped away from the normal practice set by other established photographers at the time of giving a journalistic depiction of suffering. She instead chose to show the world from the perspective of children by taking pictures of their chalk art. She usually positions the camera and styles the photo in a way that gives the focus of her photography power.

Her choice to display children playing in the street and explore street photography, fights against what was going on at the time. Legislation being passed in New York at the time was limiting many of the working classes access to these public spaces. Laws were passed that directly targeted these communities in an attempt to control them. New bans on noise targeted working class and minority communities. There was a movement to also try to keep children from playing on the street, believing it is unsafe for them out there. Instead, it encouraged safe new areas that were usually built more in upper and middle class areas. Helen Levitt instead explored the narrative of those who lived in these areas and played in these streets as a way to empower the subjects of her photos.

== Personal life and death ==
She had to give up making her own prints in the 1990s due to sciatica, which also made standing and carrying her Leica difficult, causing her to switch to a small, automatic Contax. She was born with Ménière's syndrome, an inner-ear disorder that caused her to "[feel] wobbly all [her] life." She also had a near-fatal case of pneumonia in the 1950s. Levitt lived a personal and quiet life. She seldom gave interviews and was generally very introverted. She never married, living alone with her yellow tabby Blinky. Levitt died in her sleep on March 29, 2009, at the age of 95.

== Awards ==
- 1946: MoMA photography fellowship
- 1959 and 1960: Guggenheim Fellowship
- 1976: National Endowment for the Arts Photography Fellow
- 1997: ICP Infinity Award, Master of Photography
- 2008: Francis J. Greenburger Award for excellence in the arts
- 2008: Spectrum - Internationaler Preis für Fotografie der Stiftung Niedersachsen, accompanied by an exhibition at the Sprengel Museum, Hanover
- 2022: International Photography Hall of Fame

== Exhibitions ==
=== Solo exhibitions ===
- 1943: Helen Levitt: Photographs of Children, Museum of Modern Art, New York, curated by Nancy Newhall (alongside a solo show by Eliot Porter: Birds in Color)
- 1949: Photo League, New York, with John Candilario
- 1952: Institute of Design, Illinois Institute of Technology, Chicago, with Frederick Sommer
- 1963: Three Photographers in Color, MoMA, New York, with Roman Vishniac and William Garnett
- 1974: Projects: Helen Levitt in Color, Museum of Modern Art, New York, continuous projection of 40 color slides, curated by John Szarkowski
- 1975: Pratt Institute, Brooklyn
- 1976: Nexus Gallery, Atlanta, Georgia
- 1980: Corcoran Gallery, Washington, D.C. (catalogue)
- 1980: Sidney Janis Gallery, New York
- 1980: Helen Levitt: Color Photographs, Grossmont College, El Cajon, California (catalogue)
- 1982: Fraenkel Gallery, San Francisco (again in 1986, 1994, and 1996 [...?])
- 1983: Street Portrait: The Photographs of Helen Levitt Museum of Fine Arts, Boston
- 1985: Moderna Museet, Stockholm
- 1987: International Center of Photography, New York
- 1987: Laurence Miller Gallery, New York (1989–92 annually, 1996 [...?])
- 1988: The Photographers' Gallery, London
- 1991: San Francisco Museum of Modern Art and Metropolitan Museum of Art, first major retrospective in US, toured North America until 1994 (catalogue)
- 1993: Seattle Art Museum, with Mary Ellen Mark
- 1994: Diputación Provincial de Granada (Palacio de los Condes de Gabia), Spain, toured (catalogue)
- 1997: International Center of Photography, New York
- 1998/99: Frankfurter Kunstverein, Rupertinum, Salzburg, Festspielgalerie Berlin, and Villa Stuck, Munich (catalogue)
- 2001: Centre national de la photographie, Paris
- 2007: Henri Cartier-Bresson Foundation, Paris
- 2008: Foam Fotografiemuseum Amsterdam
- 2008: Sprengel Museum, Hanover, accompanied her award for the Spectrum International Photography Prize (catalogue)
- 2010: PHotoEspaña, Madrid, 2010 and toured (catalogue)
- 2018/19: Albertina Museum, Vienna (catalogue)
- 2021/22: In the Street, The Photographers' Gallery, London, Foam Fotografiemuseum Amsterdam (catalogue)
- 2023: Henri Cartier-Bresson, Helen Levitt - Mexico, Fondation Henri Cartier-Bresson, Paris
- 2024: “Helen Levitt: New York Street Photographer, 1930s–1940s”, Margulies Collection, Miami, (October 18,2023- April 27,2024), Included her Graffiti, Mexico City, and Subway series.
- 2025: “Manhattan Transit”, Zander Galerie, Paris, (February 6 – March 22, 2025), Levitt’s Subway series from the 1970s
- 2025: “Helen Levitt: Complete Works”, Fundación MAPFRE, Barcelona (September 24, 2025 – February 1, 2026) and Madrid (February 9, 2026 - May 17.2026), First-ever exhibition covering her entire oeuvre, including newly released archives.

=== Group exhibitions ===
- 1939: Museum of Modern Art, New York
- 1949: Six Women Photographers, MoMA, New York
- 1955: The Family of Man, MoMA, New York, worldwide touring exhibition (catalogue)
- 1965: Photography in America 1850–1965, Yale University, New Haven, Connecticut
- 1968: Harlem on My Mind, Metropolitan Museum of Art (MET), New York
- 1973: Landscape/Cityscape, MET, New York
- 1978: Mirrors and Windows, MoMA, New York, touring exhibition until 1980 (catalogue)
- 1981: The New Color: A Decade of Color Photography, Everson Museum of Art, Syracuse. New York
- 1985: American Images 1945–80, Barbican Art Gallery, London, touring exhibition in UK
- 1988: Evocative Presence, Museum of Fine Arts, Houston, Texas
- 1988: Convulsive Beauty: The Impact of Surrealism on American Art, Whitney Museum, New York
- 1988: Diamonds Are Forever, Smithsonian Institution, Washington, D.C., touring exhibition
- 1989: The New Vision: Photography Between the World Wars, MET, New York (catalogue)
- 1989: Photography: 150 Years, Australian National Gallery, Canberra
- 1989: Fotografi: 150 År, Fotografiska Museet, Moderna Museet, Stockholm
- 1989: On the Art of Fixing a Shadow, National Gallery of Art, Washington, D.C., Art Institute of Chicago, and Ikona Photo Gallery, Venice, Italy (catalogue)
- 1991: Motion and Document, Addison Gallery of American Art, Andover, Massachusetts, touring exhibition (catalogue)
- 1991: American Documents in the Finge, Tokyo Metropolitan Art Museum (catalogue)
- 1992: This Sporting Life, High Museum of Art, Atlanta, Georgia (catalogue)
- 1993: Mexico Through Foreign Eyes, ICP, New York, touring exhibition (catalogue)
- 1994: American Surrealist Photography, MoMA, New York
- 1995: American Photography 1890–1965 from the Museum of Modern Art, touring exhibition in Europe (catalogue)
- 1995: Images of an Era: Selections from the Permanent Collection, Institute of Contemporary Art, Los Angeles
- 1996: Highlights of the Permanent Collection, ICP, New York
- 1997: Documenta X, Kassel, Germany
- 2025: “Louis Faurer / Helen Levitt: New York City, 1938–1988”, Deborah Bell Photographs, NYC, (February 20 - April 19, 2025), A retrospective of Levitt’s New York street photography spanning five decades
- 2025: "Group Exhibition" - Deborah Bell Photographs, NYC, (currently running as of late 2025), Levitt’s work is featured alongside artists like Eleanor Antin, Bruce Davidson, Vivian Maier, and Deana Lawson
- 2025: “Funny Business: Photography and Humor”, Phoenix Art Museum, Explores comedy in photography. Includes Helen Levitt, John Baldessari, Zig Jackson, William Wegman, and Garry Winogrand
- 2025 “A Decade of Collecting Photography: 2015–2025”, Telfair Museums, Savannah, (August 15, 2025 – January 4, 2026), Celebrates women photographers including Helen Levitt, alongside Joel Meyerowitz and others

== Films ==
- In the Street (1948): cinematographer and editor
- The Quiet One (1948): cinematographer and writer
- The Stairs (1950): producer
- Steps of Age (1951), for the Mental Health Film Board
- Another Light (1952): director and co-editor with Janice Loeb
- The Savage Eye (1960): cinematographer
- The Balcony (1963): assistant director
- An Affair of the Skin (1963): co-producer with Ben Maddow
- In the Year of the Pig (1968): co-editor with Hannah Moreinis
- The End of an Old Song (1972): editor

== Publications ==
- Levitt, Helen; Agee, James (1965). A Way of Seeing. New York: Horizon Press.
  - A Way of Seeing (3 ed.). Duke University Press. 1989. ISBN 978-0-8223-1005-1.
- Livingston, Jane S. (1980). Helen Levitt (exhibition catalogue). Washington: Corcoran Art Gallery.
- Hellman, Roberta; Hoshimo, Marvin (1980). Helen Levitt: Color Photographs (exhibition catalogue). El Cajon: Grossmont College.
- Levitt, Helen; Coles, Robert (1987). In the Street: Chalk Drawings and Messages, New York City, 1938–1948. Duke University Press. ISBN 0-8223-0771-5.
- Phillips, Sandra S.; Hambourg, Maria Morris (1991). Helen Levitt (exhibition catalogue). San Francisco Museum of Modern Art. ISBN 0-918471-22-2.
- Levitt, Helen; Oles, James (1997). Mexico City. W. W. Norton & Company. ISBN 0-393-04549-8.
- Weiermair, Peter, ed. (1998). Helen Levitt (exhibition catalogue, Frankfurter Kunstverein, Rupertinum, Salzburg, Berliner Festspiele, Villa Stuck, Munich). Munich/New York: Prestel. ISBN 3-7913-1974-4.
- Levitt, Helen; Prose, Francine (2001). Crosstown. Brooklyn: powerHouse Books. ISBN 1-57687-103-7.
- Levitt, Helen; Gopnik, Adam (2004). Here and There. powerHouse Books. ISBN 1-57687-165-7.
- Szarkowski, John (2005). Slide Show: The Color Photographs of Helen Levitt. powerHouse. ISBN 978-1-57687-252-9.
- Schube, Inka (2008). Helen Levitt (exhibition catalogue, Sprengel Museum Hannover). Spectrum – International Photography Prize. powerHouse. ISBN 978-1-57687-429-5.
- Trachtenberg, Alan; Chevrier, Jean-François; Ribalta, Jorge (2010). Helen Levitt: Lírica Urbana (in Spanish). La Fabrica Editorial. ISBN 978-84-92841-24-0.
- Dyer, Geoff (2017). One, Two, Three, More. powerHouse. ISBN 978-1-57687-852-1.
- Campany, David (2017). Manhattan Transit: The Subway Photographs of Helen Levitt. Cologne: Galerie Thomas Zander and Verlag der Buchhandlung Walther König. ISBN 978-3-96098-122-0.
- Moser, Walter, ed. (2018). Helen Levitt (exhibition catalogue, Albertina, Vienna). Heidelberg/Berlin: Kehrer. ISBN 978-3-86828-897-1.
