= A Bronx Morning =

1931 film

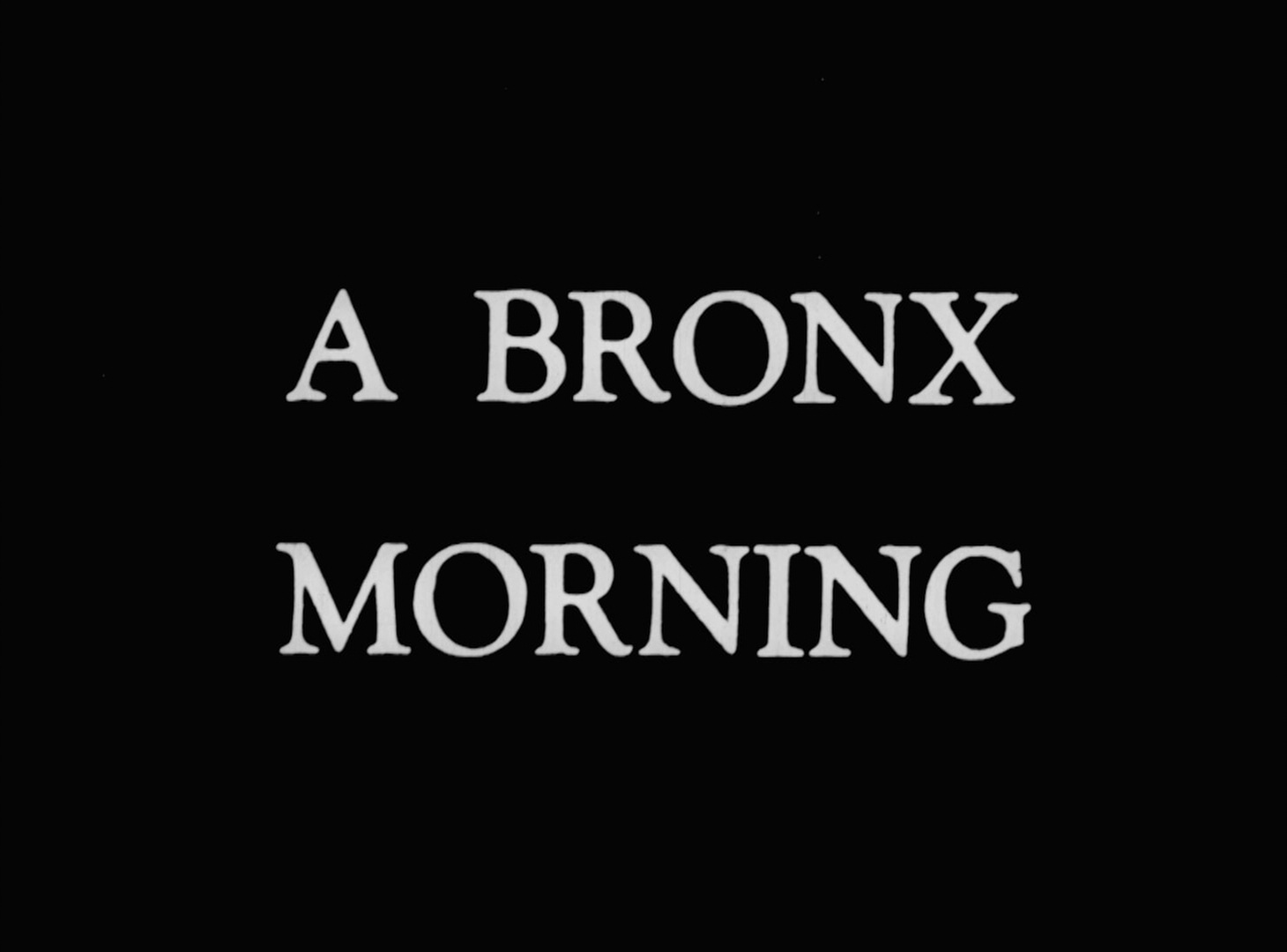
- Directed by: Jay Leyda
- Release date: 1931
- Running time: 11 minutes
- Country: United States
- Language: English

A Bronx Morning

A Bronx Morning is a 1931 American Pre-Code avant-garde film by American filmmaker Jay Leyda (1910–1988).

In 2004, A Bronx Morning was selected for preservation in the United States National Film Registry by the Library of Congress as being "culturally, historically, or aesthetically significant".

== Synopsis ==
Described as "city symphony", the eleven-minute European style film recorded a Bronx street in New York City before it is crowded with traffic. As opposed to the other films classified under the “city symphony” tradition, A Bronx Morning focuses on one borough in New York City at one specific time of day, rather than the entire city throughout all times of day. Captured only during the morning, the film makes an effort to track specific visual motifs that crop up as these average citizens begin to go about their days. The repetition of these visuals is organized and spliced together—such as the movement of shadows projected against the concrete streets.

== Production ==
In 1931, Leyda purchased an Eyemo camera, on which he shot A Bronx Morning. The film was funded with the proceeds of a sale of a wooden figurine of Henry Ward Beecher, which Leyda had originally found in a junk shop, to a representative of Abby Aldrich Rockefeller. The film was presented at art galleries and similar venues.

== Historical context ==
Leyda produced A Bronx Morning as a silent film despite the advent of "talkies" heralded by The Jazz Singer four years before. The limited capabilities of sound-recording technology restricted the artistic freedom of the makers of early sound films, often tying them to static, tripod-mounted cameras on soundstages, at the expense of techniques developed during the silent era. Film theorists of the time criticized "talkies" accordingly, as a step backward for visual storytelling. Leyda’s 1931 film, by contrast, uses techniques that sound films could not; A Bronx Morning takes place entirely on location and heavily incorporates camera movement into its visual style.

== Impact on Leyda's career ==
A Bronx Morning was Jay Leyda's first film. He had moved to New York City in 1930 in pursuit of a career in photography. He first worked as a darkroom assistant, as well as an assistant on Ralph Steiner’s experimental films. As his career progressed, he began publishing photographic portraits in New York’s Arts Weekly magazine and exhibiting portraits at the Julien Levy Gallery. Largely unnoticed in the United States, A Bronx Morning led to Leyda's acceptance into the Moscow State Film School where he studied under Soviet filmmaker Sergei Eisenstein. Leyda was the only American ever to receive such an invitation. In Moscow, Leyda also worked alongside Dziga Vertov and Joris Ivens. Leyda went on to work as editor and advisor on People of the Cumberland and China Strikes Back. In 1974 Leyda worked as the Gottesman Professor of Cinema Studies at the New York University School of the Arts. He died in New York City on February 15, 1988.
