= Muscle Beach (film) =

- Directed by: Joseph Strick; Irving Lerner
- Music by: Earl Robinson
- Distributed by: Brandon Films
- Release date: 1948
- Running time: 9 minutes
- Country: United States
- Language: English

Muscle Beach is a 1948 short documentary film directed by Joseph Strick and Irving Lerner, showing amateur athletes and bodybuilders at the original Muscle Beach in Santa Monica, California. The soundtrack consists of songs sung by Earl Robinson.

Muscle Beach and The Savage Eye (1959) were restored by the Academy Film Archive in 2009 and 2008, respectively. The films premiered in February 2009 at San Francisco Cinematheque.
