= Kent Durden =

Kent Durden (1937–2007) was an American wildlife photographer, documentary producer and writer. He is widely known for the non-fiction book Gifts of an Eagle, published by Simon and Schuster in 1972. He followed this book with the fictional Flight to Freedom (1974) and the memoir A Fine and Peaceful Kingdom (1975).

Kent worked with his father Ed Durden while they raised, studied and filmed a golden eagle named Lady. When they first got Lady Kent was 16 years old. Lady appeared in a number of TV and films during the 16 years she was with the Durdens, most notably Disney's Grand Canyon, The Legend of the Boy and the Eagle and a number of Lassie episodes.

Kent began his own nature film making business in the 60's and 70's. Some of his experiences photographing animals for various TV shows and films was documented in the book A Fine and Peaceful Kingdom.

He also showed his film on lecture tours for the National Audubon Society for many years.

In 1971 Kent wrote the book Gifts of an Eagle. The book tells the story of all that he and his father learned about golden eagles. It also documents the strong relationship between Ed and Lady. This book and the documentary film that followed had a major impact on eagle studies. The footage of Lady's eggs hatching was the first time an eagle was filmed nesting in captivity.

== Personal life ==
In 2007, he died from a heart attack while on a Mission trip in Belize; he left a widow, Ernestine.
