= Running Target =

1956 movie

- Theatrical release poster
- Directed by: Marvin R. Weinstein
- Screenplay by: Marvin R. Weinstein; Jack Couffer; Conrad Hall, based on the short story "My Brother Down There" by Steve Frazee
- Produced by: Jack Couffer
- Starring: Doris Dowling; Arthur Franz; Richard Reeves; Myron Healey; James Parnell
- Cinematography: Lester Shorr
- Edited by: Carlo Lodato
- Music by: Ernest Gold
- Production company: Canyon Productions
- Distributed by: United Artists
- Release date: November 1, 1956
- Running time: 82 minutes
- Country: United States
- Language: English

Running Target is a 1956 American Western film directed by Marvin R. Weinstein and written by Marvin R. Weinstein, Jack Couffer and Conrad Hall. The film stars Doris Dowling, Arthur Franz, Richard Reeves, Myron Healey and James Parnell. The film was released on November 1, 1956, by United Artists.

== Plot ==
Four fugitives head for the Colorado hills after a prison break. A posse is formed, led by lawman Scott and including a couple of civilians, Jaynes, a bartender who is a marksman with a rifle, and Smitty, a resourceful woman who runs a gas station that the criminals robbed. Smitty brings along a satchel on the hunt.

A man named Kaygo is the outlaw leader and considered the toughest and smartest of the bunch. Jaynes is more obsessed than the others and a bit trigger-happy. Scott tolerates much of his behavior while trying to understand Smitty, discovering at one point that her satchel includes a pink dress.

After the others are accounted for, Kaygo is the only one left. Scott wakes in the middle of the night and sees Kaygo looking at him, but doesn't try to shoot him. The searchers go separate ways and Scott suddenly spots Smitty in her dress, romping with Kaygo in a field, obviously in love. He takes aim to shoot, then changes his mind and orders the prisoner to surrender. Jaynes, uphill from Scott, shoots Kaygo and doesn't understand why Scott and Smitty are distraught. Scott smashes Jaynes' beloved rifle and walks off hugging Smitty.

== Cast ==
- Doris Dowling as Smitty
- Arthur Franz as Scott
- Richard Reeves as Jaynes
- Myron Healey as Kaygo
- James Parnell as Pryor
- Charles Delaney as Barker
- James K Anderson as Strothers
- Gene Roth as Holesworth
- Frank Richards as Castagna

== See also ==
- Running target shooting
