= Gifts of an Eagle =

Gifts of an Eagle is non-fiction book written by Kent Durden and published by Simon & Schuster in 1972.

The book details the story of Ed Durden, who raised and filmed a golden eagle, named Lady, for 16 years.

In 1975, a documentary film based on the book was released in movie theaters across the country. The film contained original footage from the 1950s to the 1970s showing the story of Lady and Ed. In 2009, the film was released in DVD format.

In 1955 Ed Durden got a grant from the Fish and Wildlife Department to capture a golden eaglet to film and study for educational purposes. A close bond developed between Ed and Lady. There were many incidents that showed the strong smarts and personality of Lady. For example: after one incident when Kent held her down while they had to trim her claws, Lady never liked him again and would dive on him whenever she was out flying free and Kent showed up. Ed found this endlessly amusing and loved getting a good shot of Lady diving while Kent ran for cover.

Lady laid eggs that were infertile. Wanting her to have the experience of motherhood, Ed replaced the eggs with fertile geese eggs (all he could find at the time). She accepted them as hers and nurtured the eggs until fluffy yellow baby geese broke out of those eggs. Lady cared for them as she would her own, even though there were some very curiously odd things about these "eagles".

Lady eventually got to raise eaglets. The amazing footage that Ed got the morning she first chirped at the breaking eagle egg was the first time an eagle being born was captured on film.

When Lady was on the nest and Ed would come into her cage, she would get up to leave, leaving the eggs to Ed to keep warm. This was how they knew that Lady had accepted Ed as her mate.

Lady on Film

Ed and Kent were wildlife photographers and Lady was used in many TV and feature films. Most notably Lady was featured in:

- 1958 - Grand Canyon Suite - A short documentary film made by Walt Disney. It won the Academy Award for that year. Lady is shown in the finale of the film. The back story of this Lady in this film is documented in the book and the film and is very interesting.
- 1961-1963 - Lassie - Episode titles: "The Eagle" 1961, "Lassie and the Eagle" 1962, "The Treasure" part 1 & 2, 1963
- 1967 - The Legend of the Boy and the Eagle - A feature length film from Disney. Lady was in the title role. This story of filming this is also detailed quite a bit on the book and film, Gifts of an Eagle
