= A Place to Live =

A Place to Live may refer to:

- A Place to Live (1941 film)
- A Place to Live (2018 film)
