= In the Street (film) =

- Cinematography: Helen Levitt; Janice Loeb; James Agee
- Edited by: Helen Levitt
- Music by: Arthur Kleiner, Ben Model
- Release dates: 1948; 1952
- Running time: 14 minutes/18 minutes
- Country: United States
- Language: Silent

In the Street is a 16-minute documentary film released in 1948 and again in 1952. The black and white, silent film was shot in the mid-1940s in the Spanish Harlem section of New York City. Helen Levitt, Janice Loeb, and James Agee were the cinematographers; they used small, hidden 16 mm film cameras to record street life, especially of children. Levitt edited the film and, subsequent to its first release, added a piano soundtrack composed and performed by Arthur Kleiner. In 2020 Ben Model composed for a special Museum of Modern Art screening a new music score. This version plays about 18 minutes.

== Production ==
In the Street (1948)

The film is generally considered as an extension of Levitt's (now famed) street photography in New York City, and Levitt subsequently re-used the title, In the Street, for a volume reproducing her photographs. Loeb was a painter and photographer. James Agee was a noted writer; both Loeb and Agee subsequently collaborated with Levitt on a second film, The Quiet One (1948).

Manny Farber summarized the film at the time, "The movie, to be shown around the 16mm circuit, has been beautifully edited (by Miss Levitt) into a somber study of the American figure, from childhood to old age, growing stiffer, uglier, and lonelier with the passage of years." The artist Roy Arden recently summarized the film somewhat differently, "In The Street is reportage as art. It reports the facts, but for their useless beauty above all. While it could be argued that the film tells us how working class residents of Spanish Harlem lived in the 1930s and 1940s - how they looked and behaved, the addition of expository narration could have told us so much more. Statistics and other facts could have helped us put what we see into context and multiplied the use-value of the film. The absence of narration or other texts proves the artist's intent that we are intended to enjoy the film as a collection of beautiful appearances."

== Reception ==
In 2006, In the Street was selected for preservation in the United States National Film Registry by the Library of Congress as being "culturally, historically, or aesthetically significant".

== Release ==
A videotape version of the film was released in 1996, but is apparently out of print.
