= Jay Leyda =

American film historian (1910–1988)

- Born: February 12, 1910; Detroit, Michigan, United States
- Died: February 15, 1988 (aged 78); New York City, United States
- Occupations: Filmmaker, Biographer
- Spouse: Si-Lan Chen

Jay Leyda (February 12, 1910 – February 15, 1988) was an American avant-garde filmmaker and film historian, noted for his work on U.S, Soviet, and Chinese cinema, as well as his documentary compilations on the day-to-day lives of Herman Melville and Emily Dickinson.

== Life and work ==
Leyda was born on February 12, 1910, in Detroit, Michigan. He was a member of the Workers Film and Photo League in the early 1930s. He traveled to the Soviet Union in 1933 to study film making at State Film Institute, Moscow, with Sergei Eisenstein, who had a troubled relationship with Stalin and the Soviet film bureaucracy. He participated in the filming of Eisenstein's lost film Bezhin Meadow (1935–37). When he returned to the United States in 1936 to become an assistant film curator at the Museum of Modern Art, he brought the only complete print of Eisenstein's Battleship Potemkin. In the 1940s he translated Eisenstein's writings.

Leyda's wife, Si-Lan Chen, a ballet dancer of international reputation, was the daughter of Eugene Chen, a colleague of the Chinese revolutionary Sun Yat-sen.

In late 1943, during World War II, Leyda joined the U.S. Army Tank Corps at Fort Knox. He was honorably discharged in 1944 after contracting pneumonia.

Although he did not have a Ph.D., Leyda became fascinated with Herman Melville and became an important figure in the Melville revival. These scholars moved beyond the acceptance of Melville's first-person accounts in his works as reliably autobiographical. To provide concrete evidence, Leyda searched libraries, family papers, local archives and newspapers across New England and New York to gather The Melville Log (1951) to document Melville's day-to-day activities and transactions.

Leyda was invited in 1959 to work at the Film Archive of China in Beijing, where he stayed until 1964. His account of Chinese film history, Dianying, was the first full-length treatment to appear in English. Although he could use the basic (and now outdated) Chinese scholarship only in summary translations, Leyda's knowledge of film gave him still useful insights into individual films and techniques.

He was awarded the Eastman Kodak Gold Medal Award in 1984. He taught at Yale University (1969–1972), York University (1972–73) and New York University from 1973 until his death in New York on February 15, 1988, of heart failure. He was professor and dissertation advisor to noted film historian, Charles H. Harpole (creator of the ten volume History of American Cinema, dedicated to Leyda); leading film theorist, Tom Gunning; and scholar-practitioner Charles Musser. In 1981 he was a member of the jury at the 12th Moscow International Film Festival. He co-curated (with Charles Musser) Before Hollywood: Turn of the Century American Film (1987) for the American Federation of Arts, a six-part touring program of American films with an accompanying catalog, which the New York Times called "A fascinating look at the cinema that flourished between 1895 and 1915 in America, before movies could be mentioned in family newspapers."

== Selected filmography ==
A Bronx Morning (1931)

- A Bronx Morning (1931) (11 minutes, black and white, silent), in the collection of the Museum of Modern Art.
- People of the Cumberland (1937) (21 minutes, black and white, sound), co-directed by Sidney Meyers, also in the collection of the Museum of Modern Art. The film was a Frontier Film Group production. Also working on the film were Elia Kazan, Ralph Steiner, Erskine Caldwell, Alex North, Earl Robinson and Helen van Dongen.

== Selected bibliography ==
- Leyda, Jay; Bertensson, Sergei (1947). The Musorgsky reader; a life of Modeste Petrovich Musorgsky in letters and documents. New York: W.W. Norton. OCLC 885379.
- Leyda, Jay (1951). The Melville Log: A Documentary Life of Herman Melville, 1819–1891. New York: Harcourt, Brace. OCLC 174510154.
- —— (1952). The Portable Melville. New York: Viking Press.
- Leyda, Jay; Bertensson, Sergei; Satina, Sophia (1956). Sergei Rachmaninoff, a Lifetime in Music. New York: New York University Press. OCLC 344823.
- Leyda, Jay (1960). The Years And Hours of Emily Dickinson. New Haven: Yale University Press. OCLC 479248174.
- —— (1960). Kino: A History Of The Russian And Soviet Film. London: George Allen & Unwin. OCLC 468224244.
- —— (1964). Films Beget Films: A Study of the Compilation Film. New York: Hill and Wang. OCLC 186247574.
- —— (1972). Dianying/Electric Shadows: An Account of Films and the Film Audience in China. Cambridge, Massachusetts: The MIT Press. ISBN 978-0-262-12046-3. OCLC 241457.
- --- with Walter Aschaffenburg, Bartleby: Opera in a Prologue and Two Acts: Based on the Story by Herman Melville. (Bryn Mawr, Penn.: T. Presser, 1967). ISBN
- —— , "Herman Melville, 1972," in Bruccoli, Matthew J., ed. (1973). The Chief Glory of Every People; Essays on Classic American Writers. Carbondale: Southern Illinois University Press. ISBN 0809306158.
- ——; Voynow, Zina (1980). Eisenstein At Work. Pantheon Books. ISBN 978-0-394-41262-7. OCLC 8493672.
- ——; Eisenstein, Sergei (1986). Eisenstein on Disney. Methuen Paperback. ISBN 978-0-413-19640-8. OCLC 19256739.
- Spark, Clare L. (2006). Hunting Captain Ahab : Psychological Warfare and the Melville Revival. Kent, Ohio: Kent State University Press. ISBN 0873388887. Includes Leyda's role in the "Melville Revival."
- Si-lan Chen Leyda, Footnote to History (New York: Dance Horizons), 1984 ISBN 9780871271341
