= Eisenstein on Disney =

Book edited by Jay Leyda

- Editor: Jay Leyda
- Author: Sergei Eisenstein
- Publication date: 1986
- ISBN: 978-0-930-62138-4
- OCLC: 16529071

Eisenstein on Disney is a 1986 book edited by film critic Jay Leyda that collects and reprints the various literature that Sergei Eisenstein produced about Walt Disney.

== Summary ==
Eisenstein composed the majority of the text in 1941 after his introduction to the Hollywood culture industry. It was published much later than most of Leyda's other seminal works on Eisenstein and it presents a unique side of this highly theoretical Soviet film director who is usually portrayed as an outsider to American pop culture.
