= The Savage Eye =

- Poster
- Directed by: Ben Maddow; Sidney Meyers; Joseph Strick
- Written by: Ben Maddow; Sidney Meyers; Joseph Strick
- Produced by: Ben Maddow; Sidney Meyers; Joseph Strick
- Starring: Barbara Baxley; Herschel Bernardi; Jean Hidey; Elizabeth Zemach; Gary Merrill
- Cinematography: Jack Couffer; Helen Levitt; Haskell Wexler
- Edited by: Ben Maddow; Sidney Meyers; Joseph Strick
- Music by: Leonard Rosenman
- Distributed by: Trans-Lux Distributing-Kingsley International
- Release date: June 6, 1960
- Running time: 68 minutes
- Country: United States
- Budget: $65,000

The Savage Eye is a 1959 independent film written, produced, directed, and edited by Ben Maddow, Sidney Meyers, and Joseph Strick.

== Plot ==
A "dramatized documentary" film that superposes a dramatic narration of the life of a divorced woman with documentary camera footage of Los Angeles.

== Production ==
According to Ben Maddow, the film began when Joseph Strick wanted to make an extended film. Maddow suggested a film about William Hogarth "using the etchings, rephotographing them, and comparing them with modern London, to see whether there were parallels or changes. This was a development of that." Eventually the concept of the film evolved. "It's really an anthropological film about the lower middle class, anywhere, but it happened to be [set in] Los Angeles, so it was an investigatory job as well as a film job."

Benjamin Jackson has noted that Irving Lerner, Strick's collaborator on the earlier documentary Muscle Beach (1948), "was part of the original group, but left in the middle of production." The camera footage for the film was shot over four years by the principal cinematographers Haskell Wexler, Helen Levitt, and Jack Couffer. The sound editing for the film was one of Verna Fields' early credits. Barbara Baxley enacted the role of divorcée Judith X, while Gary Merrill was the male narrator who voiced her angel, her double: "That vile dreamer, your conscience."

The directing trio worked over several years on this film during their weekends.

== Exhibition ==
The film premiered at the Edinburgh Film Festival in August 1959 and received the Roy Thomson Edinburgh Film Guild Award; at the Venice Film Festival, it took the Italian Film Clubs Prize. It also won the 1959 BAFTA Robert Flaherty Award for Best Feature Length Documentary. Reviewing its debut at the Edinburgh Film Festival, the art critic David Sylvester called its imagery "sharp, intense, spectacular, and imaginative".

== Reception and legacy ==
The film opened commercially in New York City on June 6, 1960. In his The New York Times review, A. H. Weiler characterized the film:

... it is from the photographic and sound-track concentration on the Hogarthian faces of Los Angeles that The Savage Eye derives most of its ferocity. The rabid wrestling-match audiences; the middle-aged and elderly ladies seeking improvement of gross bodies in beauty parlors; the sensuous writhings of Jean (Venus the Body) Hidey as she strips and teases in a burlesque joint, and, most effectively, the matter-of-fact faith healer who doles out wholesale blessings on the afflicted (done with a direct voice and sound track) are the most striking glints in The Savage Eye.

John Hagan has written further of the film's influence that: "One can see how, in its study of a woman whose marital problems have estranged her from the world, it anticipated, if not influenced, such films as The Misfits, Red Desert, and Juliet of the Spirits."

The Academy Film Archive preserved The Savage Eye in 2008.

Ben Maddow said the film "was imitated many, many times. It's not easy to imitate." He liked the film "quite a lot, even though I think there were excesses in the writing which was perhaps a little over-rhetoricized. But on the whole, it is a single tone, even if that tone is of lurid colors."
