= Si-Lan Chen =

Dancer, choreographer, and activist of Chinese and Afro-Caribbean descent

Chen Xilan
- Born: 1905; Trinidad
- Died: 1996; Contra Costa, California, USA
- Occupation(s): Ballet dancer, modern dancer, choreographer, activist
- Spouse: Jay Leyda
- Parents: Eugene Chen (father); Agatha Alphosin Ganteaume (mother)

Si-Lan Chen (Chinese: 陳錫蘭; 1905–1996), also known as Sylvia Si-Lan Chen Leyda, Chen Xuelan, or Chen Xilan, was a dancer, choreographer, and activist of Chinese and Afro-Caribbean descent.

== Life ==
Si-Lan Chen was born in Trinidad in 1905 (some sources also give her birth year as 1909), the daughter of Eugene Chen, a Chinese-Trinidadian lawyer and diplomat, and Agatha Alphosin Ganteaume, a Trinidadian woman of French Creole heritage. In 1912, she moved to London, where she studied dance at the Stedman Academy. In 1926, she moved to China, where her father held the position of foreign minister in the government of Sun Yat-Sen.

In 1927, her family fled to Moscow after Chiang Kai-Shek took power in China. While in Moscow, Chen enrolled in the school of the Bolshoi Ballet and subsequently studied modern dance, including working with the avant-garde choreographer Kasyan Goleizovsky, becoming an early exponent of modern dance in the Soviet Union. She was also the first ballet teacher of her cousin, Dai Ailian, who would go on to become an influential figure in modern dance in China. Chen also studied at Vera Maya's Isadora Duncan School and the Lunacharsky Theatrical Technicum.

Chen's dance combined classical dance with African and African American folk cultures. She was influenced by other interpretive styles, including from the Caribbean, from the Soviet Union (especially its Central Asian regions), and Chinese folk tradition.

In 1931, Chen married Soviet film director Mikhail Mikhailovich. The marriage was unhappy, lasting three months during which Chen and Mikhailovich did not live with each other, and ended in divorce. Mikhailovich was mentally ill and hung himself in Spring 1932.

Chen was romantically involved with the poet Langston Hughes during his visit to Moscow in 1932. In 1933, she met Jay Leyda, an American filmmaker and film historian, whom she married in 1934.

In 1935, Chen was diagnosed with cancer and had major surgery at the Shanghai Red Cross hospital.

During the 1930s and 1940s, following the Japanese invasion of China, she performed in benefits to raise relief funds for China, touring in the U.S., Mexico, and the Caribbean, and was an active supporter of anti-imperialist movements. Chen's U.S. performances often included jazz and blues dance. She adapted her dance program Southern Blues based on a poem by Hughes. Lead Belly was a frequent musical performer of Southern Blues with Chen.

Chen also worked in Hollywood as a choreographer and dance instructor, appearing in some films, such as The Keys to the Kingdom (1944). Chen did ballet background work for Anna and the King of Siam (1946). Chen staged several dance movements in Slave Girl (1947). Chen played the only Chinese role in South Sea Sinner (1950). Her last film appearance was an uncredited role in Peking Express (1951). During her time working in Hollywood, Chen opposed efforts by China's Nationalist government to censor Hollywood films it deemed as insulting to China or Chinese.

Chen opposed China's Nationalist government, which Chiang Kai-shek led. Due to her leftist commitments, Chen was monitored by the FBI and forced to frequently leave and re-enter the U.S. by the American immigration authorities, despite her marriage to a U.S. citizen. The FBI surveilled her during meetings of the Hollywood Arts, Sciences, and Professional Council (HASPC). According to the FBI, at HASP meetings Chen advocated the U.S. ending its intervention in the Korean War and "stated that she did not care if FBI agents were in the audience, she was going to speak her 'bit' anyhow."

Chen was invited to participate in the development of The Red Detachment of Women, which later became one of the model plays during the Cultural Revolution, but declined.

In 1984, she published an autobiography, Footnote to History. A collection of her papers is housed at the New York University libraries, including her correspondence with Langston Hughes and Pearl S. Buck, her FBI file, documentation of her dance career, and other writings.

== Works of choreography ==
- Landlord on a Horse (1938)
- Shanghai Sketches (1938). This ballet is composed of solos, each less than two minutes long, which sought to show "typical characters" a person might encounter in Shanghai, with a satirical view point that is sympathetic to the "underdog".
- Shanghai Park. The piece is themed on an infamous sign in Shanghai that barred "Chinese and dogs" and drew from Chen's experience seeing the exclusion of Chinese from public facilities in Shanghai, Guangzhou, and Wuhan.
- Two Chinese Women (1938)
- Chinese Student-Dedication (1938)
- In Conquered Nanking (1939)
- Uzbec Dance (1939)

== Writings ==
- Footnote to History, ed. Sally Banes (Dance Horizons, 1984), autobiography.
