= Sing a Country Song =

- Directed by: Jack McCallum
- Produced by: Jack McCallum
- Starring: Tex Ritter; Red Steagall; Dawson Stewart; Billy Joe Shaver; Blake Emmons; Duane Eddy; Sonny Curtis; Jerry Chesnut; Ben Peters
- Edited by: Verna Fields
- Production companies: Dunkirk Bunker Sand and Movie Co.
- Release date: August 10, 1973 (Cloverdale)
- Running time: 90 minutes
- Country: Canada
- Language: English

Sing a Country Song is a 1973 musical documentary that was directed by Jack McCallum. The film, edited by Verna Fields, consisted of performances and interviews with country singers Billy Joe Shaver, Duane Eddy, Tex Ritter, Sonny Curtis, Red Steagall, and others. It was filmed in Los Angeles and Nashville.

The budget of the film was CA$100,000.

The film premiered on August 10, 1973, at the Clova Theatre in Cloverdale, British Columbia.
