= The Keys of the Kingdom (film) =

1944 film by John M. Stahl

- Theatrical film poster
- Directed by: John M. Stahl
- Written by: Nunnally Johnson; Joseph L. Mankiewicz
- Based on: The Keys of the Kingdom; 1941 novel by A. J. Cronin
- Produced by: Joseph L. Mankiewicz
- Starring: Gregory Peck; Thomas Mitchell; Vincent Price; Rose Stradner; Edmund Gwenn; Benson Fong; Roddy McDowall; Sir Cedric Hardwicke; Si-Lan Chen
- Narrated by: Sir Cedric Hardwicke
- Cinematography: Arthur C. Miller
- Edited by: James B. Clark
- Music by: Alfred Newman
- Distributed by: 20th Century Fox
- Release date: December 15, 1944
- Running time: 136 minutes
- Country: United States
- Language: English
- Budget: $3 million
- Box office: $2.4 million

The Keys of the Kingdom is a 1944 American drama film adapted from the 1941 novel The Keys of the Kingdom by A. J. Cronin. The film was adapted by Nunnally Johnson, directed by John M. Stahl, and produced by Joseph L. Mankiewicz. It stars Gregory Peck, Thomas Mitchell, and Vincent Price, and tells the story of the trials and tribulations of a Roman Catholic priest who goes to China to evangelise.

== Plot ==
In 1938, Monsignor Sleeth visits Father Francis Chisholm in his old age at his Scottish parish of Tynecastle in Tweedside. Sleeth reveals he has recommended for Francis to retire due to his unorthodox teachings. When Sleeth goes into his room in the rectory, he discovers Francis' journal.

In 1878, Francis and his parents are practicing Catholics living in a Protestant village in Scotland. One night, during a heavy storm, an anti-Catholic mob assaults Francis' father. As Francis' mother helps her wounded husband on their journey home, they both drown when the swift and rising river washes them away. Francis's aunt raises him until he leaves for the seminary with his childhood friend, Anselm "Angus" Mealey.

A young man, Francis studies for about a year, but finds himself still in love with Nora, a girl from his hometown. He eventually learns Nora has had a child out of wedlock. Francis leaves to see her, but she has died giving birth to a daughter Judy when he arrives. Francis completes his studies at the seminary.

Francis accepts an offer from Bishop McNabb to lead a missionary in China. Francis arrives at the village of Pai-tan, where he learns a church was destroyed due to a flood. As he evangelizes, Francis is chastised by two deceitful catechists, Hossanah and Philomena Wang. He also refuses to accept congregants known as "rice Christians" who only attend to receive free rice.

A young Christian Chinese, Joseph, offers to help rebuild the church for free. Together, they form the St. Andrews Christian Mission. Sometime later, Francis receives medical supplies from his agnostic childhood friend, Dr. William "Willie" Tulloch. Francis is then summoned into the home of Mr. Chia, a local official, to cure his only son of an infection. Francis cures the boy, but he gently refuses Chia's offer to convert to Christianity, as his conversion is not based on his faith.

Relieved, Chia donates land and provides laborers to rebuild the mission. Three nuns led by Reverend Mother Maria Veronica arrive to support the mission. Francis offers friendship to Maria Veronica, but she rebuffs his kindness due to her aristocratic background. When the Wangs return, Maria Veronica ignores Francis's warnings to not trust them, and they later rob the nuns.

Two years later, Willie visits the mission. As imperial troops battles the republican forces, Willie and Francis form a makeshift hospital, treating injured soldiers. Francis is soon alerted that the church has been bombed. On their way to see the ruins, Willie is fatally shot and dies under Francis' care. When an imperial general threatens to destroy the mission, Francis assists the republican army when he uses a torch to destroy the imperial army. Francis however is injured and walks with a limp from thereon.

Later, Angus arrives to review the mission. He reveals that Bishop McNabb has died, therefore the Church cannot pay for rebuilding the mission, and Francis has the lowest of all in conversion rates. Angus tells Francis to focus instead on converting rich Chinese and appear more fashionable, but Francis refuses. After Angus leaves, Maria Veronica, moved by Francis's humility, apologizes for her haughty behavior towards him. Francis forgives her, and with financing provided by Maria Veronica's wealthy family, their church is rebuilt.

Ten years later, Francis and Maria Veronica have become friends. Francis greets two Methodist missionaries Dr. Wilbur and Agnes Fiske, who have opened a church in the village. Years later, Francis reaches retirement age and two young priests arrive to replace him. Francis hopes to look after Judy's son, Andrew, when he returns to Scotland. On his final day, Maria Veronica and Joseph bid their farewells and Francis blesses the townspeople as he leaves.

Back in 1938, Sleeth finishes reading Francis' journal by sunset. As he prepares to leave, Sleeth leaves Francis to continue serving his parish and raise Andrew.

== Cast ==
- Gregory Peck as Father Francis Chisholm
- Thomas Mitchell as Dr. Willie Tulloch
- Vincent Price as Anselm "Angus" Mealey
- Rose Stradner as Reverend Mother Maria-Veronica
- Roddy McDowall as Francis Chisholm, as a boy
- Edmund Gwenn as Reverend Hamish McNabb
- Sir Cedric Hardwicke as Monsignor Sleeth
- Dennis Hoey as Alec Chisholm, Francis' father
- Ruth Nelson as Lisbeth Chisholm, Francis' mother
- Edith Barrett as Aunt Polly Bannon
- Peggy Ann Garner as Nora, as a girl
- Jane Ball as Nora, as an adult
- James Gleason as Rev. Dr. Wilbur Fiske
- Anne Revere as Agnes Fiske
- Benson Fong as Joseph
- Leonard Strong as Mr. Chia
- Philip Ahn as Mr. Pao, envoy for Mr. Chia
- Arthur Shields as Father Tarrant, at Holywell
- Sara Allgood as Sister Martha
- Ruth Ford as Sister Clotilde
- Richard Loo as Major Shen
- H.T. Hsiang as Hossanah Wang
- Si-Lan Chen as Philomena Wang
- Ruth Clifford as Sister Mercy Mary (uncredited)
- Eunice Soo-Hoo as Anna, as a toddler

== Production ==
David O. Selznick originally purchased the screen rights to A. J. Cronin's novel, intending to produce the film for United Artists. However, by 1943, Selznick dissolved his independent production studio, Selznick International Pictures, and the rights were acquired by Twentieth Century-Fox. Several actors were considered for the role of Father Chisholm, which included Spencer Tracy, Orson Welles, Edward G. Robinson, Gene Kelly, and Henry Fonda. However, the part went to Gregory Peck.

At Twentieth Century-Fox, Nunnally Johnson had written a script adaptation and was intended to supervise the production, but he left to join William Goetz's independent studio International Company. Joseph L. Mankiewicz, who had left Metro-Goldwyn-Mayer (MGM) and became contracted to Fox, took over as producer. He then substantially rewrote Johnson's script. Meanwhile, Alfred Hitchcock had expressed interest in directing the project, but opted instead to direct Lifeboat (1944).

Ingrid Bergman was the studio's first choice for the part of Mother Maria-Veronica. In February 1944, the Catholic publication The Tidings reported Geraldine Fitzgerald and Mankiewicz's wife Rose Stradner had tested for the role. Stradner later told the publication the character reminded her of one of the nuns she had known at the Sacred Heart Convent in her native Vienna: "The character of Maria-Veronica reminded me strongly of her. She was in fact, just the same woman; strong-willed, unfliching in her faith, richly educated and of fine family lineage."

When Bergman became available, Darryl F. Zanuck instead offered Stradner a two-picture contract with the studio, as he felt Bergman's box office appeal would compensate for Peck, who was then an unknown actor. Mankiewicz personally pleaded to Zanuck to keep Stradner in the role, to which Zanuck complied.

== Reception ==
Abel Green of Variety favorably compared the film to The Song of Bernadette, writing it was an "inspired, dignified, artistic, heart-warming cinematography" about the "cavalcade of a priest's life, played excellently by Gregory Peck". Bosley Crowther of The New York Times felt the adaptation was a "surface shadow of [Cronin's novel] that was so finely wrought", but acknowledged Peck "gives a quiet and forceful performance in the role of the priest and carries a fine impression of godly devotion and dignity."

James Agee for The Nation declared, "While I was watching The Keys of the Kingdom ... I liked it quite well for its sincerity and for what then seemed its reasonably clean effort to present a hero whose heroism is moral. As I think it over, much of the sincerity and of the ethics seems beefy, over-comfortable, love-your-fellow-mannish, and in general rather uninteresting." Harrison's Reports wrote the film was "a story of sacrifice, tolerance, and faith, told in a dignified, sympathetic, and impressive way. The picture's pace is too slow in spots, and the elimination of some of the footage would benefit it, nevertheless, it holds one's attention all the way through. Gregory Peck, as the priest, gives a flawless and sensitive performance."

Edwin Schallert of the Los Angeles Times felt Peck's performance was "a highly inspired achievement in acting of the most sincere type". Nevertheless, he regarded the film as "a biographical narrative, painstaking to a high degree, and possessed of both significance and humanness. But it lacks the verve and charm of a Going My Way, and ruggedly sets forth the experiences of its hero, centering mostly on his work as a missionary in China." A review in Time magazine similarly noted the film "lacks the parochial authenticity, the comic pathos and the sagacious acting which made Going My Way the best of all movies about priests. But it is rather more attentive to religion, and its religiousness is not only free of pomp and sanctimony but is also human, dramatic and moving."

Among retrospective reviews, Pauline Kael was unimpressed, writing it was "Hollywood at its most virtuous." She further wrote, "The director John M. Stahl sets a slow, santicimous pace and holds to it, with Peck's beautiful, uncharimastic face lighted 'from within'." Critic Leslie Halliwell stated, "Studio-made missionary melodrama, a big hit for its new star but otherwise an undistinguished piece of work with a shuffling pace and not much by way of climax." In a 2010 review, film critic Jay Carr wrote:

Again and again, one is impressed by the depth of talent on studio rosters of the time, in this case 20th Century-Fox. Not just Gwenn, Mitchell, Hardwicke, and Price, but James Gleason, Roddy McDowall (Chisholm as a boy), Peggy Ann Garner, Anne Revere and Benson Fong dot the cast list in this solidly crafted film – measured, stately, patient, never loud or pounding (except when the mission is caught in a war between imperial and nascent republican troops, and Father Chisholm briefly takes up arms!). It would have to be because it's essentially a film about interiority translated into service, a film of cumulative increments...The bottom line is that The Keys of the Kingdom and Peck convince us they're about a man in a cassock spending his life trying to do the right thing.

== Accolades ==
The film was nominated for Academy Awards in the following categories:

- Best Actor in a Leading Role (Gregory Peck)
- Best Art Direction-Interior Decoration, Black-and-White (James Basevi, William S. Darling, Thomas Little, and Frank E. Hughes)
- Best Cinematography, Black-and-White (Arthur C. Miller)
- Best Music, Scoring of a Dramatic or Comedy Picture (Alfred Newman)

== Music ==
Alfred Newman incorporated Irish and Chinese elements into the score. The theme at the heart of the track, "The Hill of the Brilliant Green Jade", is associated with a Chinese nobleman (Mr. Chia) who befriends Father Chisholm after the latter has saved his son's life. Newman later reused the melody in his Oscar-winning score for the 1955 film Love Is a Many-Splendored Thing. Richard Rodgers lifted the tune for the song "I Have Dreamed" in the 1951 musical The King and I.

== Adaptations in other media ==
The Keys of the Kingdom was adapted as a radio play on the November 19, 1945, episode of Lux Radio Theater, featuring Ronald Colman and Ann Harding. It was also adapted on the August 21, 1946 episode of Academy Award Theater, with Gregory Peck reprising his leading role.
