= The Darwin Adventure =

1972 British film by Jack Couffer

- Theatrical release poster
- Directed by: Jack Couffer
- Screenplay by: William Fairchild
- Story by: Jack Couffer; Max Bella
- Produced by: Joseph Strick
- Starring: Nicholas Clay; Susan Macready; Ian Richardson; Christopher Martin; Robert Flemyng; Philip Brack
- Cinematography: Denys Coop
- Edited by: Robert C. Dearberg
- Music by: Marc Wilkinson
- Production companies: Brightwater Film Production; Palomar Pictures
- Distributed by: 20th Century Fox
- Release date: 27 September 1972
- Running time: 91 minutes
- Country: United Kingdom
- Language: English

The Darwin Adventure is a 1972 British drama film directed by Jack Couffer and starring Nicholas Clay, Susan Macready, Ian Richardson, Christopher Martin, Robert Flemyng and Philip Brack. It was written by William Fairchild and released on 27 September 1972, by 20th Century Fox.

== Premise ==
During his 5-year voyage around the world aboard HMS Beagle, a young Charles Darwin adventured into the farthest corners of creation in his search for the truth. A truth which at the time shocked and horrified the world.

== Plot ==
The plot is in two parts. The first concerns Darwin's five-year voyage on HMS Beagle, collecting specimens in South America and the Galapagos Islands. While doing this during his observations he begins to realize that the world may not have been created according to the Bible and begins a path in formulating his theory of evolution. This brings him into conflict with the ship's commander, Captain Fitzroy, a devout Christian.

In the second part, years later, Charles Darwin is back in Britain, now married and with children, writes his book On The Origin of Species. Its publication causes a huge reaction and leads to a famous debate.

== Cast ==
- Nicholas Clay as Charles Darwin
- Susan Macready as Emma Wedgewood Darwin
- Ian Richardson as Capt. Fitzroy
- Christopher Malcolm as Sullivan
- Robert Flemyng as Prof. Henslow
- Philip Brack as Thomas Huxley
- Michael Malnick as Hooker
- Aubrey Woods as Bishop Wilberforce
- David Davenport as Robert Darwin
- Hugh Morton as Josiah Wedgewood
- Carl Bernard as Moreno
- Richard Ireson as Wickam

== Reception ==
The Monthly Film Bulletin wrote: "The 'adventure' of the title might have been more engrossing if it had been more restricted in scope. Instead, we are offered a treatment of the Complete Man, his Life and Work (with inevitable patchiness and occasional lapses into a distinctively Disney-ish tone) that is scarcely a primer introduction to the theory of evolution or to the particular nature of Darwin's synthesis and revelations on natural selection. But the film is still left with Darwin as a historical force and with the sum of his ideas, lending all scenes of domesticity an air of stagnant mummery that is hardly the actors' fault. ... The extraordinary creatures of the Galapagos do retain their curiosity value, and here, for once, the film pays attention to the actual details of Darwin's work."

Variety wrote: "Palomar Pictures kickoff film in a release deal with 20th-Fox is The Darwin Adventure, a hokey and puerile survey of Darwin's work and the controversy it sparked a century ago. The filmgoing public's own version of Darwin's natural-selection theory will weed out this inferior species. ... With very few historical exceptions, there seems to be no way for scripters and pedantry."

Leslie Halliwell wrote "Rather naive biopic of Darwin which tries to cover too much with too slender resources but makes a pleasant introduction to the subject."

In The Radio Times Guide to Films Adrian Turner gave the film 2/5 stars, writing: "In a subject far more suited to the television drama or mini-series, this is a sketchy effort that convinces us of Darwin's importance but turns his romantic life into a soap opera."
