= A Place to Live (1941 film) =

1941 film by Irving Lerner

- Directed by: Irving Lerner
- Production company: Documentary Film Productions for the Philadelphia Housing Association
- Distributed by: Brandon Films
- Release date: 1941
- Country: United States
- Language: English

A Place to Live is a 1941 documentary film directed by Irving Lerner and produced by the Philadelphia Housing Association, a nonprofit affordable housing advocacy group. The film aimed to call attention to inner city squalor in Philadelphia, Pennsylvania by focusing on a child's journey from school to his family's cramped and squalid apartment in a rat-infested slum neighborhood.

A Place to Live was nominated for the 1941 Academy Award for Best Documentary (Short Subject).

The Academy Film Archive preserved A Place to Live in 2007.
