= Sidney Meyers =

American film director and editor

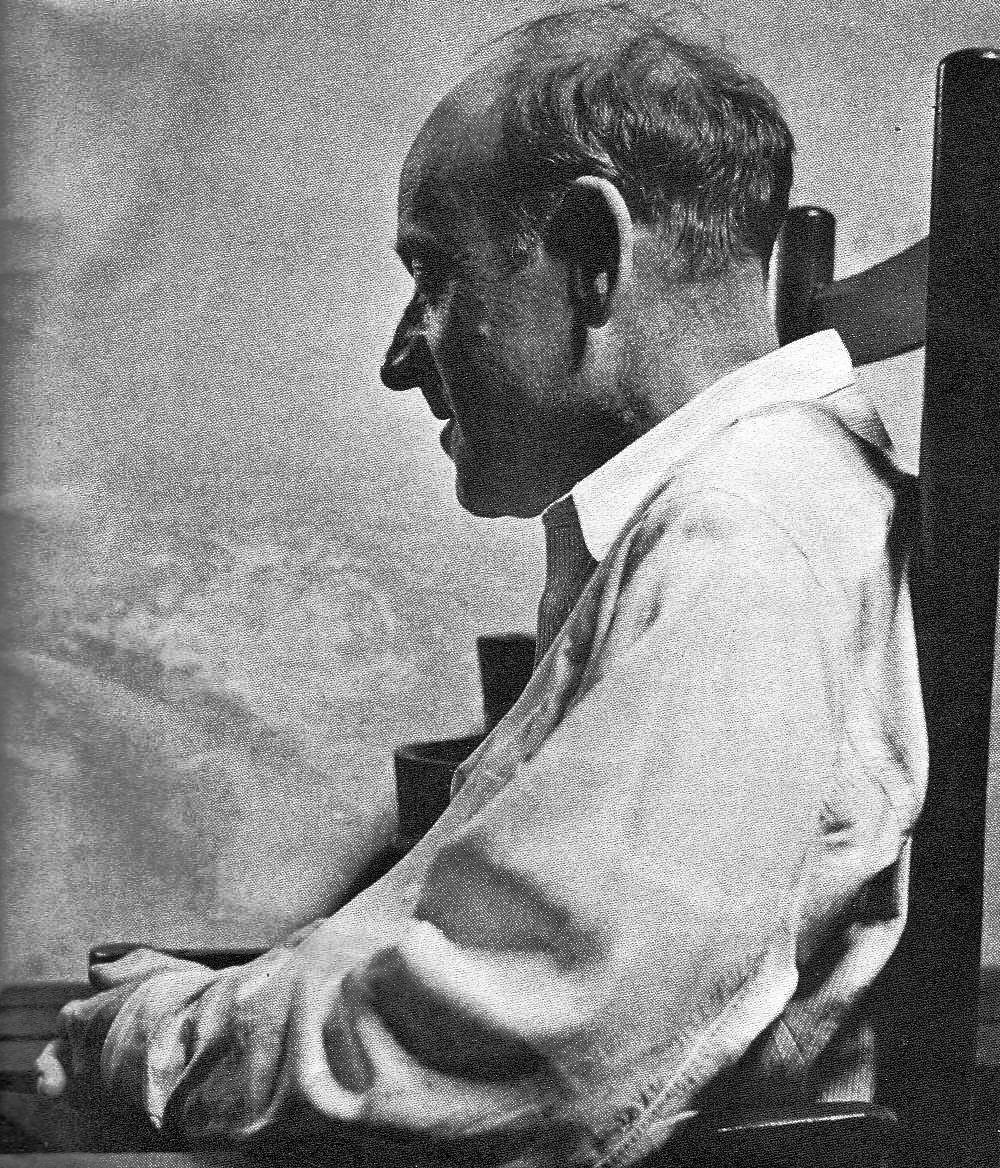
Sidney Meyers

Sidney Meyers (March 9, 1906 – December 4, 1969), also known by the pen name Robert Stebbins was an American film director and editor.

Sidney Meyers is best known for two documentary films: The Quiet One, which he wrote and directed, and for which he was nominated for an Oscar for Best Original Screenplay; and British Academy of Film and Television Arts winner The Savage Eye, which he co-directed, co-produced and co-scripted with Joseph Strick and Ben Maddow.

== Biography ==
Sidney Meyers was born in New York City on March 9, 1906, and grew up in East Harlem, then a teeming immigrant neighborhood. He was the eldest child of Abraham and Ida (née Rudock) Meyers, who had immigrated from Poland to the United States around the start of the 20th century. Abraham, a paper-hanger and activist in the Painters and Paper-hangers Union, District Council 9, of the AFL, supported the family as best he could. It was noticed early on that Sidney loved music; a Jewish charitable women's organization arranged for him to have the use of a violin and to receive music lessons when he was a young school-child.

During his years at De Witt Clinton High School Meyers played in the school's award-winning orchestra and joined the American Orchestral Society. While at the City College of New York, majoring in English literature, he continued to play the violin, and later the viola. On completing his studies he spent some three years as a member of the Cincinnati Symphony Orchestra, then conducted by Maestro Fritz Reiner.

On his return to New York City, where he lived for the rest of his life with his wife Edna (née Ocko) and their son Nicholas, Meyers became interested in film-making and began to search for work in the fields of directing and editing, while playing the violin and viola in a Work Projects Administration orchestra. As was the case with many sons and daughters of immigrant families during the seemingly-endless Great Depression, he was drawn to left-wing political ideas. Using the pen-name of Robert Stebbins he wrote on the cinema for the left-wing arts magazine New Theatre.

Meyers worked for the Federal Arts Project of the Work Projects Administration; in 1937 his film People of the Cumberland appeared under its auspices. During World War II, Meyers served first as the chief American film editor for the British Ministry of Information and later worked as a film editor for the U.S. Office of War Information.

After the end of the War Meyers established a career as a free-lance film editor. He collaborated with directors, producers and other film artists, all of whom felt that his contribution was not limited to editing, as central as the latter may be to the work. Indeed, he is best remembered for those films which he directed and wrote, and for which he served as consultant.

Meyers's television editing credits include supervision of the CBS television series East Side, West Side; The Power and the Glory with Laurence Olivier; The Slaves, with Dionne Warwick; the Wisdom Series; Assignment India; Assignment – Southeast Asia.

The Quiet One, which Meyers directed and scripted, established him as one of the leaders in the genre of documentary drama. Meyers collaborated with Ben Maddow and Joseph Strick in the production of The Savage Eye, and with Samuel Beckett and Alan Schneider on Film (film). His contribution to Edge of the City was vital.

Meyers continued to work until his untimely death from cancer in 1969: he served as consultant for The Queen (1968), and was script consultant for Joseph Strick's film adaptation of James Joyce's Ulysses. Shortly before his death he completed the editing of Joseph Strick's The Tropic of Cancer.

Shortly after his death, the Sidney Meyers Memorial Scholarship Fund was established at the City College of New York.

== Film editing in the pre-digital era ==
Until well after Meyers's death the main tool of film editing was the Moviola (or Movieola), a machine in which film was viewed, cut, and recombined manually. Ralph Rosenblum, who was mentored by Meyers, describes the exhausting process from the editor's point of view: "I sit in a corner at one of the Moviolas piecing together a sequence that was shot from five different perspectives. I work quickly, long lengths of film flying through my white-gloved right hand. I stop, mark the film with a grease pencil, fly on, make another mark, cut, splice together the desired portions, and hang up the trims, pieces of deleted film. … Five film barrels crowd the cutting room, with long trims hanging into them from an overhead rod. There's a lot of film on the floor—not rejected film, as the cliché has it, but film that's in the process of being reviewed or edited or wound" (When the Shooting Stops, pp. 5–6).

== The Quiet One ==
Meyers is arguably best remembered for The Quiet One (1948), a documentary which he directed, and for which he was one of the script writers. The documentary tells the story of the rehabilitation of a young, emotionally disturbed African-American boy; it contains text written by James Agee and narrated by Gary Merrill. In a 1949 review, Bosley Crowther defined the film: "Out of the tortured experiences of a 10-year-old Harlem Negro boy, cruelly rejected by his loved ones but rescued by the people of the Wiltwyck School, a new group of local film-makers has fashioned a genuine masterpiece in the way of a documentary drama." The still photographer Helen Levitt was one of the film's cinematographers and writers, along with the painter Janice Loeb. Ulysses Kay wrote the score for the film. The film's three writers - Meyers, Loeb, and Levitt - were nominated for the Best Writing, Story and Screenplay Academy Award; the film itself was also nominated for the Best Documentary Feature Academy Award. The National Board of Review named The Quiet One the second best film of 1949.

== Edge of the City ==
Edge of the City (1957), which Meyers edited, was directed by Martin Ritt and starred John Cassavetes, Sidney Poitier, Jack Warden, Kathleen Maguire and Ruby Dee. The score was composed by Leonard Rosenman. Edge of the City was based on Robert Alan Arthur's screenplay which was the final episode of The Philco Television Playhouse: "A Man Is Ten Feet Tall" (1955). Although produced by MGM the film received a low budget; MGM feared that because of its racial content it could not be shown in the southern US, and indeed because of the refusal of theaters in the South and elsewhere to screen the film, it was not a commercial success.

The film was considered unusual for its time not only because of its portrayal of an interracial friendship, but also because the main African-American character was in a position of authority over the white; and also due to hints that the character played by Cassavetes might be homosexual. Edge of the City was praised by representatives of the NAACP, the Urban League, the American Jewish Committee, among others, for its courageous depiction of an interracial friendship.

== The Savage Eye ==
The Savage Eye (1959) is a documentary drama which conflates a dramatic narration of the life of a divorced woman with documentary camera footage from an unnamed American city (actually Los Angeles) in the 1950s. It stars Barbara Baxley. The film was written, produced, directed, and edited by Meyers, Ben Maddow and Joseph Strick. The camera footage was done by cinematographers Haskell Wexler, Helen Levitt and Jack Couffer; the music is by Leonard Rosenman. The Savage Eye won the 1960 BAFTA Flaherty Documentary Award as well as several film festival prizes.

The Savage Eye belongs to the cinema vérité movement of the 1950s and '60s. In the words of John Hagan: "One can see how, in its study of a woman whose marital problems have estranged her from the world, it anticipated, if not influenced, such films as The Misfits, Red Desert, and Juliet of the Spirits."

== Influences ==
Among those cinematic currents which may be said to have influenced Meyers's work were Romanticism: notably Robert J. Flaherty's Nanook of the North (1922). The latter was filmed on site, using local people and claiming to show their lives as they really were. Such films were staged, however; Flaherty famously had his subject kill a walrus with a harpoon rather than use his gun.

Another major influence on young film-makers of the 1920s and '30s was Realism. The latter, largely a European tradition, included "city symphony" films, which aimed to show people as products of the man-made environment in which they lived. Walter Ruttman's Berlin, Symphony of a City (1927), is an example. In the USSR Kino-Pravda ("cinematic truth") was developed by Dziga Vertov, who created Soviet news-reels during the 1920s. According to Vertov's cinematic philosophy the movie, via techniques such as slow motion, time lapse, fast motion, close-ups and of course editing, could produce a rendition of reality more accurate than that perceived by the human eye.

Meyers's influence can be discerned in cinema verité and its close relative direct cinema. Enabled by the development of convenient, portable cameras and means of synchronizing sound, cinema verité often involved following a person during moments of personal crisis. The place of editing in creating the final artistic product is so central that the editor is on occasion given credit as consultant, or even co-director.

== Legacy ==
Shortly before his death Meyers began to write notes for a book which was never published. The following is from these notes:

"On one level film editing is like editing in general, literary editing, writing a piece of literature, preparing a book review or any presentation, selling an idea, putting it over. General principles maintain, clarity of ideas, coherence, emphasis on chief idea, lining up of proofs, and substantiation, avoidance of repetition, avoidance of belaboring the obvious, in other words, granting the reader intelligence but at the same time stressing value of your contribution to his fund of knowledge. A sense of when you've made your case and that any further exposition on it will be overdoing matters. These are by no means easy objectives to attain but necessary to obtain, nevertheless. ...

The film is very different. It is an expression in continuity. Its own qualities, its own dynamics. There is no turning back or leaping ahead unless you are permitted to do so by the film itself. Film is a Form in Continuity, within a more or less restricted frame. This frame is its entire world. Nothing exists outside of it. And whatever happens within it is autonomous."

== Films and TV--partial list ==
- Tropic of Cancer (1969) -- Editor
- Slaves (1969) -- Editor (TV)
- Ulysses (1967) -- Script Consultant
- Film (1965) -- Editor
- FDR (1965) -- Editor (TV mini-series)
- East Side/ West Side (1963–4) -- Editor (CBS TV)
- The Power and the Glory (1961) -- Editor (CBS TV)
- Music of Williamsburg (1960) -- Director and Editor (Colonial Williamsburg)
- The Savage Eye (1959) – Co-producer, Co-director
- Edge of Fury (1958) - Editing Supervisor
- Adventuring in the Arts (1956) -- Director
- Edge of the City (1956) -- Editor
- The Steps of Age (1951) -- Supervising Editor
- The Quiet One (1949) -- Director; Script; Editor
- In the Street (1947) -- Filmmaker
- People of the Cumberland (1937) -- Director

== Awards and nominations ==
1967 Man-made Man (CBS) won the Lasker Award for the best medical film of the year

1959 The Savage Eye won the British Academy Awards' Robert Flaherty Award for Best Feature Length Documentary

1959 The Savage Eye nominated at the Venice Film Festival for the Fipresci Prize

1959 The Savage Eye top honors at Edinburgh Film Festival

1949 The Quiet One nominated at the Venice Film Festival for the International Prize

1949 The Quiet One nominated at the Venice International Film Festival for Competing Film

1948 The Quiet One nominated by Academy of Motion Picture Arts and Sciences for Best Original Screenplay in the documentary category
