= Janice Loeb =

American filmmaker

- Born: December 6, 1913; U.S.
- Died: February 18, 1996 (aged 82); Salt Lake City, Utah, U.S.
- Occupations: Cinematographer; Screenwriter; Film director; Film producer

Janice Loeb (November 18, 1918 – December 17, 2005) was an American painter, cinematographer, screenwriter, film director, and producer. She was best known for her work in the documentary films In the Street (1948) and The Quiet One (1948).

Loeb collaborated with artist and filmmaker Helen Levitt and James Agee on In the Street, shot in 1945-6, which documented the lives of working class working residents of Spanish Harlem.

She was nominated for an Academy Award for the latter, becoming the first woman to be nominated in the category of Best Documentary Feature.

In addition to In the Street and The Quiet One, Loeb and Levitt also collaborated on Steps of Age (1951), for the Mental Health Film Board, and Another Light (1952).

== Personal life ==
Loeb was a graduate of Vassar College, Class of 1935.

Loeb worked closely with Levitt, with whom she was also close friends and married Levitt's brother, Bill.

== Awards and nominations ==
Year	Award	Category	Nominated work	Result
1949	21st Academy Awards	Best Documentary Feature	The Quiet One	Nominated
1949	22nd Academy Awards	Best Original Screenplay (with Helen Levitt & Sidney Meyers)	The Quiet One	Nominated

== See also ==
- List of female Academy Award winners and nominees for non-gendered categories
