= The Legend of the Boy and the Eagle =

1967 film

- Directed by: Jack Couffer
- Written by: Jack Couffer
- Produced by: Hamilton Luske; Joseph Strick
- Starring: Stanford Lomakema
- Cinematography: Ed Durden; Jack Couffer
- Edited by: Verna Fields; Lloyd L. Richardson
- Production company: Walt Disney Productions
- Distributed by: Buena Vista Distribution Company
- Release date: June 21, 1967
- Running time: 48 minutes
- Country: United States
- Language: English

The Legend of the Boy and the Eagle is a 1967 American live-action Walt Disney film.

== Plot summary ==
A Hopi Indian boy is banished from his village after he defies tribal law and frees a sacred, sacrificial eagle. After surviving in the wilderness he returns to his village where he is again rejected. Fleeing, the boy climbs a cliff and jumps off but before he reaches the ground turns into an eagle.

== Cast ==
- Stanford Lomakema as The Eagle boy
- Frank Dekova as Narrator (voice)
- April Begay as Sister

== See also ==
- List of American films of 1967
