= Irving Lerner =

American film director

- Born: March 7, 1909; New York City, New York, United States
- Died: December 25, 1976 (aged 67); Los Angeles, California, United States
- Occupation: Film director
- Known for: blacklisted during the McCarthy period

Irving Lerner (March 7, 1909 – December 25, 1976) was an American film director.

== Biography ==
Before becoming a filmmaker, Lerner was a research editor for Columbia University's Encyclopedia of Social Sciences, getting his start in film by making documentaries for the anthropology department. In the early 1930s, he was a member of the Workers Film and Photo League, and later, Frontier Films. He made films for the Rockefeller Foundation and other academic institutions, becoming a film editor and second-unit director involved with the emerging American documentary movement of the late 1930s. Lerner produced two documentaries for the Office of War Information during World War II and after the war became the head of New York University's Educational Film Institute. In 1948, Lerner and Joseph Strick shared directorial chores on a short documentary, Muscle Beach. Lerner then turned to low-budget, quickly filmed features. When not hastily making his own thrillers, Lerner worked as a technical advisor, a second-unit director, a co-editor and an editor.

Lerner was cinematographer, director, or assistant director on both fiction and documentary films such as ...One Third of a Nation... (1939), Valley Town (1940), The Land (1942) directed by Robert Flaherty, and Suicide Attack (1950). Lerner was also producer of the OWI documentary Hymn of the Nations (1944), directed by Alexander Hammid, and featuring Arturo Toscanini. He was co-director with Joseph Strick of the short documentary Muscle Beach (1948).

Irving Lerner was also a director and film editor with directing credits such as Studs Lonigan (1960) and editing credits such as Stanley Kubrick's Spartacus (1960). Lerner died during the editing of Martin Scorsese's New York, New York (1977), and the film was dedicated to him.

== Legacy ==
Three of Lerner's films—A Place to Live, Muscle Beach, and Hymn of the Nations were preserved by the Academy Film Archive in 2007, 2009 and 2010, respectively.

== Alleged Soviet espionage ==
Irving Lerner was an American citizen and an employee of the United States Office of War Information during World War II, and he worked in the Motion Picture Division. Lerner allegedly was involved in espionage on behalf of Soviet Military Intelligence (GRU); Arthur Adams, a trained engineer and experienced spy who escaped to the Soviet Union in 1946, was Lerner's key contact.

In the winter of 1944, a counterintelligence officer caught Lerner attempting to photograph the cyclotron at the University of California, Berkeley Radiation Laboratory; Lerner was acting without authorization. The model for the cyclotron was used for the Y-12 plant at Oak Ridge, Tennessee, for uranium enrichment; and, research work at Stanford using the cyclotron led to the Manhattan Project at Hanford, Washington, dedicated to producing plutonium for the bomb dropped in Nagasaki. Lerner resigned and went to work with Joseph Strick for Keynote Records, owned by Eric Bernay, another Soviet intelligence contact. Arthur Adams, who ran Irving as an agent, also worked at Keynote.

== Filmography ==
As Director

- A Town Called Hell (1971, uncredited)
- The Royal Hunt of the Sun (1969)
- Ben Casey (ABC-TV series, 13 episodes, 1961–1965)
- Seaway (1965) (TV series, unknown episodes)
- Mr. Novak (NBC-TV series, 1 episode, 1963)
- Cry of Battle (1963)
- Target: The Corruptors (ABC-TV, 1 episode, 1961)
- King of Diamonds (1 episode, 1961)
- Studs Lonigan (1960)
- City of Fear (1959)
- Murder by Contract (1958)
- Edge of Fury (1958)
- Man Crazy (1953)
- Suicide Attack (1951)
- Muscle Beach (1948)
- To Hear Your Banjo Play (1947)
- Swedes in America (1943, with Ingrid Bergman)
- The Autobiography of a 'Jeep' (1943, with Joseph Krumgold)
- A Place to Live (1941)

As Producer

- Hay que matar a B. (1975, co-producer)
- The Darwin Adventure (1972, co-producer)
- Bad Man's River (1971, executive producer)
- Captain Apache (1971, associate producer)
- Custer of the West (1967, executive producer)
- The Wild Party (1956, supervising producer)
- C-Man (1949, producer)
- To Hear Your Banjo Play (1947, co-producer)
- Hymn of the Nations (1944, producer, uncredited)

As Editor

- Mustang: The House That Joe Built (1978)
- The River Niger (1976)
- Steppenwolf (1974)
- Executive Action (1973)
- Spartacus (1960, uncredited)
- The Marines Come Thru (1938)
- China Strikes Back (1937, unconfirmed)

As Second Unit Director or Assistant Director

- A Town Called Hell (1971, second unit director)
- Custer of the West (1967, second unit director: Civil War sequence)
- Spartacus (second unit director, uncredited)
- Valley Town (1940, second unit director)
- ...One Third of a Nation... (1939, second unit director, uncredited)

As Actor

- Hay que matar a B. (1975)
- On Camera (1 episode, 1955)
- Pie in the Sky (1935)

As Miscellaneous Crew

- The Savage Eye (1960, technical advisor)
- God's Little Acre (1958, associate to director)
- Robot Monster (1953, production associate)

Editing Department

- New York, New York (1977, supervising editor)
- Executive Action (1973, associate editor)

Production Manager

- Men in War (1957, production supervisor)

As Cinematographer

- The Land (1942)

Dedicatee

- New York, New York (1977)

== See also ==
- Atomic spies
- US Office of War Information (OWI)
