= Barbara Baxley =

American actress and singer (1923–1990)

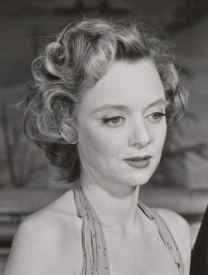
- Baxley in a 1955 stage production of Bus Stop
- Born: Barbara Angie Rose Baxley; January 1, 1923; Porterville, California, U.S.
- Died: June 7, 1990 (aged 67); Manhattan, New York, U.S.
- Occupations: Film, stage, television actress
- Years active: 1943-1990
- Spouse: Donald Douglas Taylor (1961-1979)

Barbara Angie Rose Baxley (January 1, 1923 – June 7, 1990) was an American actress and singer.

== Early life ==
Barbara Baxley was born on January 1, 1923 in Porterville, California to Bert and Emma Baxley. She had an older sister. She attended University of the Pacific in Stockton.

Barbara Baxley acted for six years in productions of schools and Little Theaters before she had her first professional role.

== Career ==
A life member of the Actors Studio, Baxley also studied acting under the tutelage of Sanford Meisner at the Neighborhood Playhouse School of the Theater in New York City. Her first film was East of Eden, where she portrayed Adam Trask's obnoxious nurse at the end of the film.

Baxley had the challenging lead role in the 1960 film The Savage Eye, portraying a divorcee exploring Los Angeles, speaking in voice-over narration and dialog without delivering any directly spoken lines on screen. A.H. Weiler wrote in a New York Times review that Baxley's acting possessed "restraint and sensitivity to register both the poignance and tragedy of her situation."

In 1961, she was nominated for a Tony Award for Best Actress (Dramatic) for her performance in the Broadway production of Tennessee Williams's comedy Period of Adjustment. She appeared in Chekhov's The Three Sisters and Neil Simon's Plaza Suite as well as the 1960s Broadway musical She Loves Me. She also starred in the 1976 Broadway play Best Friend.

Baxley appeared in supporting roles in many television series of the 1950s, 1960s, and 1970s. In the series Richard Diamond, Private Detective, she played a wife who had her rodeo performer husband murdered. She appeared in a 1958 Perry Mason episode "The Case of the Gilded Lily", and she played the role of Cora Wheeler in the original Twilight Zone episode of "Mute".

Baxley played two different characters in two episodes of Have Gun – Will Travel, the widow Lucy "Rose" Morrow in the episode "Killer's Widow" (1958), and Lily Leighton in the episode "Full Circle" (1960). She also played roles on Where the Heart Is and Another World, two daytime series. She appeared in an episode of The Fugitive as the one-armed man's girlfriend and in six episodes of Alfred Hitchcock Presents.

Another Baxley performance came in a 1973 episode of Hawaii Five-O, titled "One Big Happy Family", where she portrayed the matriarch of a serial-killing family. In season 8 (episode "A Sentence to Steal"), she appeared as Elizabeth Rollins.

She is perhaps better known for the role of Lady Pearl, the feisty companion of country music icon Haven Hamilton (Henry Gibson), in Robert Altman's film Nashville (1975) and as the mother of Sally Field's character in Norma Rae (1979).

== Personal life ==
Baxley was a close friend of musician Dave Brubeck and his wife; according to him, Baxley was more like a member of the family. He later confirmed that Baxley was a liberal Democrat, an atheist, a woman who always put the needs and well-being of others before her own self, and that when she died, he and his wife, Iola, not only handled her funeral arrangements but buried her in the same cemetery next to their own plots so that they all could be together as one in death, same as in life, because their bond held such a strong connection.

== Death ==
Baxley died at age 67 on June 7, 1990 at her home in Manhattan, New York of an apparent heart attack. She is buried at Umpawaug Cemetery in Redding, Connecticut.

== Filmography ==
Year	Title	Role	Notes
1955	East of Eden	Nurse	uncredited
1957	Alfred Hitchcock Presents	Miss Elliot	Season 2 Episode 16: "Nightmare in 4-D"
1957	Alfred Hitchcock Presents	Lalage	Season 2 Episode 30: "The Three Dreams of Mr. Findlater"
1958	Alfred Hitchcock Presents	Anne Smith	Season 4 Episode 6: "Design for Loving"
1958	The Texan (TV series)	Ruth McKnight	Episode first aired: 9/29/58
1958	Perry Mason	Enid Griffin	Season 1 Episode 34: “The Case of the Gilded Lily”
1958	The Badlanders	Diane	(scenes deleted)
1959	Alfred Hitchcock Presents	Myra Jenkins	Season 5 Episode 6: "Anniversary Gift"
1959	Alcoa Presents: One Step Beyond	Miss Lois Morrison	Episode: "Message from Clara" (broadcast November 10)
1960	Alfred Hitchcock Presents	Irma Coulette	Season 5 Episode 22: "Across the Threshold"
1960	The Savage Eye	Judith McGuire	
1962	Alfred Hitchcock Presents	Maude Sheridan	Season 7 Episode 16: "The Case of M.J.H."
1962	All Fall Down	Schoolteacher	
1963	The Twilight Zone	Cora Wheeler	Season 4 Episode 5: "Mute"
1967	Countdown	Jean	
1968	No Way to Treat a Lady	Belle Poppie	
1972	Images	Telephone	voice, uncredited
1974	The Rookies	Clara	Season 3, Episode 14
1975	Nashville	Lady Pearl	
1979	Butterflies in Heat		
1979	Norma Rae	Leona	
1982	A Stranger Is Watching	Lally	
1985	Murder She Wrote	Amanda Debs	Season 2 Episode 9: “Jessica Behind Bars”
1989	Sea of Love	Miss Allen	
1990	A Shock to the System	Lillian	
1990	The Exorcist III	Shirley	
