= The Quiet One (film) =

- Directed by: Sidney Meyers
- Written by: Helen Levitt; Janice Loeb; Sidney Meyers; James Agee (commentary)
- Produced by: Janice Loeb
- Starring: Gary Merrill; Donald Thompson; Clarence Cooper; Sadie Stockton; Estelle Evans; Paul Baucum
- Cinematography: Richard Bagley; Helen Levitt; Janice Loeb
- Music by: Ulysses Kay
- Production companies: Film Documents, Inc.
- Distributed by: Arthur Mayer & Joseph Burstyn
- Release date: 1948
- Running time: 65 minutes
- Country: United States

The Quiet One is a 1948 American documentary film directed by Sidney Meyers. The documentary chronicles the rehabilitation of a young, emotionally disturbed African-American boy; it contains a commentary written by James Agee, and narrated by Gary Merrill. In his 1949 review, Bosley Crowther characterized the film succinctly:

Out of the tortured experiences of a 10-year-old Harlem Negro boy, cruelly rejected by his loved ones but rescued by the people of the Wiltwyck School, a new group of local film-makers has fashioned a genuine masterpiece in the way of a documentary drama.

The still photographer Helen Levitt was one of the film's cinematographers and writers, along with the painter Janice Loeb, who also produced. The neoclassical composer Ulysses Kay wrote the score for the film. The film's principal cinematographer, Richard Bagley, also photographed the critically acclaimed New York semidocumentary feature On the Bowery.

The film was nominated for the Academy Award for Best Documentary Feature at the 21st Academy Awards, losing to The Secret Land, and was then nominated for the Academy Award for Best Original Screenplay at the 22nd Academy Awards the next year, losing to Battleground. Along with Street Angel, it is one of two English-language films to receive Oscar nominations in separate years.

The National Board of Review named The Quiet One the second best film of 1949.
