= Thomas Brandon (film distributor) =

Thomas J. Brandon (1908–1982) was a founding member of the New York Workers Film and Photo League. He later worked as a film distributor for Garrison Films, which distributed films such as People of the Cumberland and The Spanish Earth. Brandon then founded his own company, Brandon Films in November 1940 and acquired the Garrison catalog. During the 1950s, Brandon Films owned the largest collection of 16mm available for general release in the United States. He was the first president of the New York Film Council, and helped to found the short-lived Film Forum in 1933 with Pulitzer Prize-winning playwright Sidney Howard. In 1968, Brandon sold his company to Macmillan; the new entity became known as Audio-Brandon. Audio-Brandon was later acquired by Films Inc.

Brandon's work in the 1970s to reclaim and publicize the history of 1930s film activism is an important source for film historians. Brandon's unpublished manuscripts and documents on radical film history are deposited at the New York Museum of Modern Art Film Study Center. Films from his collection were donated to several archives including the Museum of Modern Art and the U.S. Library of Congress, and others.
