= Jack Couffer =

American cinematographer and director (1924–2021)

- Born: December 7, 1924; Upland, California, U.S.
- Died: July 30, 2021 (aged 96); Costa Mesa, California, U.S.
- Occupation(s): Cinematographer, film director and television director

Jack Craig Couffer A.S.C. (December 7, 1924 – July 30, 2021) was an American cinematographer, film and television director, and author. Couffer specialized in documentary films, often involving nature and animal cinematography. Couffer was nominated for an Academy Award for Best Cinematography for his work on the film version of the novel Jonathan Livingston Seagull (1974).

Couffer served in the United States Army during the Second World War. Based on his war experience, he subsequently wrote a book about the "Bat Bomb" project to use bats to deliver incendiary bombs. Following the war, Couffer studied at the University of Southern California School of Cinema-Television. During the 1950s, Couffer and a friend sailed a boat to the Galapagos islands, staying for 10 months - an event Couffer described as the best time in his life.

Couffer has described his subsequent career as follows:

With his mixed abilities as a naturalist and film maker, Jack joined Walt Disney Studios as a cameraman on the early True Life Adventure series of nature films. He worked at Disney for more than ten years in a variety of functions--writer, director, producer, cameraman--and participated there in the making of more than two dozen movies.

Among many other projects with Disney, Couffer wrote, directed, and filmed the documentary The Legend of the Boy and the Eagle (1967). Couffer has also worked on numerous independent and major studio films and television shows. Couffer was credited as a cinematographer for the influential, experimental documentary The Savage Eye (1959), and received his nomination for the Academy Award for Best Cinematography for the film Jonathan Livingston Seagull (1973). He had worked with Joseph Strick on The Savage Eye, and Strick co-produced two drama films directed and written by Couffer, including Ring of Bright Water (1969) and The Darwin Adventure (1972).

In addition to his book about the "Bat Bomb," Couffer published ten other books of non-fiction and fiction. In 2019, Couffer lived in Corona Del Mar, California and was still working at the age of 94. He died in July 2021 at the age of 96 in a nursing facility in Costa Mesa, California.
