= Eugene Chen =

Chinese revolutionary, lawyer, and diplomat

- 陳友仁
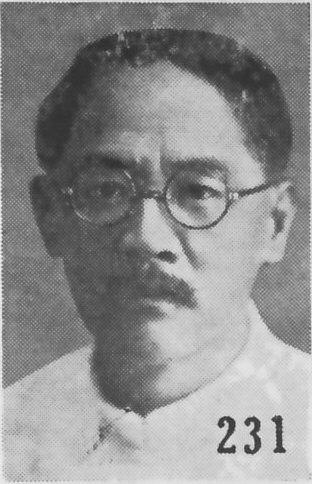
- Eugene Chen as pictured in The Most Recent Biographies of Chinese Dignitaries

Minister of Foreign Affairs
- In office 1 June 1931 – 1932
- Preceded by: Alfred Sao-ke Sze
- Succeeded by: Luo Wengan

Personal details
- Born: 2 July 1878 San Fernando, Colony of Trinidad and Tobago
- Died: 20 May 1944 (aged 65) Shanghai, Reorganized National Government of the Republic of China
- Resting place: Babaoshan Revolutionary Cemetery, Beijing, China
- Party: Kuomintang
- Spouses: Agatha Alphosin Ganteaume (m. 1899; died 1926) Georgette Chen (m. 1930)
- Children: Percy Chen (son); Si-Lan Chen (daughter); Jack Chen (son); Yu-Lan Chen (daughter)
- Parents: Chen Guangquan (father); Mary Longchallon (mother)

Chinese name
- Traditional Chinese: 陳友仁
- Simplified Chinese: 陈友仁
Transcriptions
Standard Mandarin
- Hanyu Pinyin: Chén Yǒurén
- Wade–Giles: Ch'en Yu-jen

Eugene Chen or Chen Youren (Chinese: 陳友仁; Wade–Giles: Ch'en Yu-jen; 2 July 1878, San Fernando, Trinidad and Tobago – 20 May 1944, Shanghai), known in his youth as Eugene Bernard Achan, was a Chinese Trinidadian lawyer who in the 1920s became Chinese foreign minister. He was known for his success in promoting Sun Yat-sen's anti-imperialist foreign policies.

== Early Biography ==
=== Childhood ===
Chen was born in San Fernando, Trinidad and Tobago to ethnic Chinese parents. He was the oldest of Chen Guangquan and Mary Longchallon's three sons. Both parents were Chinese Hakka immigrants to Trinidad. Chen's father, Chen Guangquan, was known as Joseph Chen or Achan. He immigrated to the French West Indies where he met his wife, Mary Longchallon (Marie Leong), also a Chinese immigrant. Joseph Chen, as well as the Longchallon family, had been required by the French authorities to accept the Catholic faith as a condition of immigration.

=== Education ===
After attending a Catholic school, St Mary's College, Trinidad, Chen qualified as a barrister and became known as one of the most highly skilled solicitors in the islands. The family did not speak Chinese at home and, since there were no Chinese schools, he also did not learn to read Chinese. It was later said of him that his library was filled with Dickens, Shakespeare, Scott, and legal books, that he "spoke English as a scholar"; "except for his color, neither his living nor his habits were Chinese".

== Professional life ==
After graduating from university, Chen eventually left Trinidad and Tobago to work in London, where he heard Sun Yat-sen speak at a rally against the Manchu government in China. Sun persuaded him to come to China and contribute his legal knowledge to the new Republic in 1912. Chen took the Trans-Siberian Railroad, and shared the journey with Wu Liande, a physician born in Malaysia. Learning that Chen had no Chinese name, Wu suggested "Youren" as the equivalent of "Eugene": "Youren" has the meaning of "friend of benevolence", and thus echoed his birth name both in meaning and (especially when pronounced in Teochew - Yujeng) sound.

After Sun was forced to flee to Japan in 1913, Chen remained in Beijing (Peking), where he began a second career in journalism. Chen edited the bilingual Peking Gazette 1913–1917, then founded the Shanghai Gazette, the first of what Sun envisioned as a network of newspapers across China. Chen had given up his initial support for Yuan Shikai and became a strong critic of the government, accusing it of "selling China", for which offence he was imprisoned. In 1918, Chen joined Sun in Canton to support the southern government, which he helped to represent at the Paris Peace Conference, where he opposed Japanese and British plans regarding China. In 1922, Chen became Sun's closest adviser on foreign affairs, and developed a leftist stance of anti-imperialist nationalism and support of Sun's alliance with the Soviet Union.

=== Chen's revolutionary diplomacy ===
Chen's diplomacy led one historian to call him "arguably China's most important diplomat of the 1920s and instrumental in the rights recovery movement." Chen welcomed Sun's alliance with the USSR, and worked harmoniously with Michael Borodin, the chief Soviet and foreign policy adviser to Sun Yat-sen on the reorganization of the Nationalist Party at Canton in 1923. After Sun's death, Chen was elected to the Central Executive Committee of Kuomintang, Nationalist Minister for Foreign affairs at Canton, and Ruler of Hankou, all being achieved in 1926. He was forced to resign in April 1927. Over the next two years, Chen lodged several protests with the American and UK governments over their concessions in China, as well as negotiating with the British colonial authorities from British Raj over labor strikes. When Chiang Kai-shek's Northern Expedition appeared on the verge of unifying the country, Chen joined the rival Nationalist government at Wuhan.

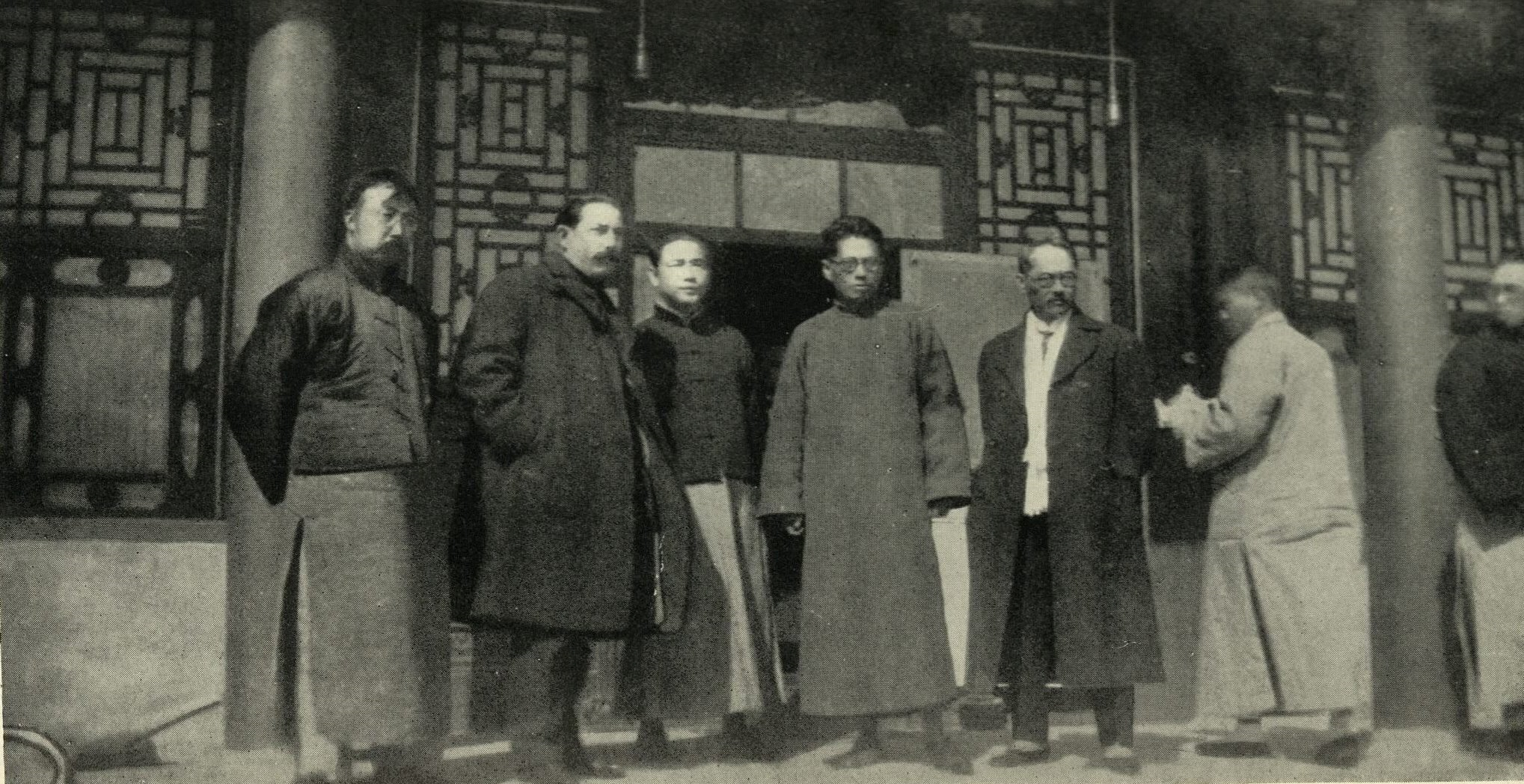
With other leaders of Wuhan Nationalist government, 1927, from left to right: Mikhail Borodin (second from left), Wang Jingwei, T. V. Soong and Eugene Chen

In January 1927, the Nationalists forcibly took control over the British concession in Wuhan, and when violent crowds also took the foreign concession at Jiujiang, foreign warships gathered at Shanghai. In the same month, Chen wrote an article ("a special message") for The Daily Express, in which he labeled the British as "the first to subject China to the political and economic domination of the West". More explicitly, he stated that the subjugation of China to the West was "the work of the opium wars, in which the British defeated China and imposed a system, not of visible conquest, as in India, but of invisible conquest, in the form of a regime of international control known as the reign of imperialism". Chen also presented the demands of the Nationalists: the restoration of "the lost independence of China", and "the cancellation of the unequal treaties on which the regime of foreign imperialism in China is based". Chen's negotiations with the British led in February 1927 to the Chen-O'Malley Agreement which provided for a combined British-Chinese administration of the concession. In 1929 the British concession in Wuhan formally came to an end. From then on it was administered by the Chinese authorities as the Third Special Area. While the event as such was comparatively minor, as was the territory involved, this nevertheless constituted both a diplomatic humiliation as well as an ominous precedent for the British government. In March 1927, with the rapidly approaching National Revolutionary Army (NRA) about to reach Nanjing there was an outbreak of violence against foreigners, now known as the Nanjing Incident, and Chiang Kai-shek launched White Terror attacks on Communists in Shanghai. Chen sent Borodin, his sons Percy Chen and Jack Chen, and the American leftist journalist Anna Louise Strong in an automotive convoy across Central Asia to Moscow. He, his daughters Si-lan and Yolanda, Soong Ching-ling, and the American journalist Rayna Prohme traveled from Shanghai to Vladivostok, and once again by Trans-Siberian Railway to Moscow.

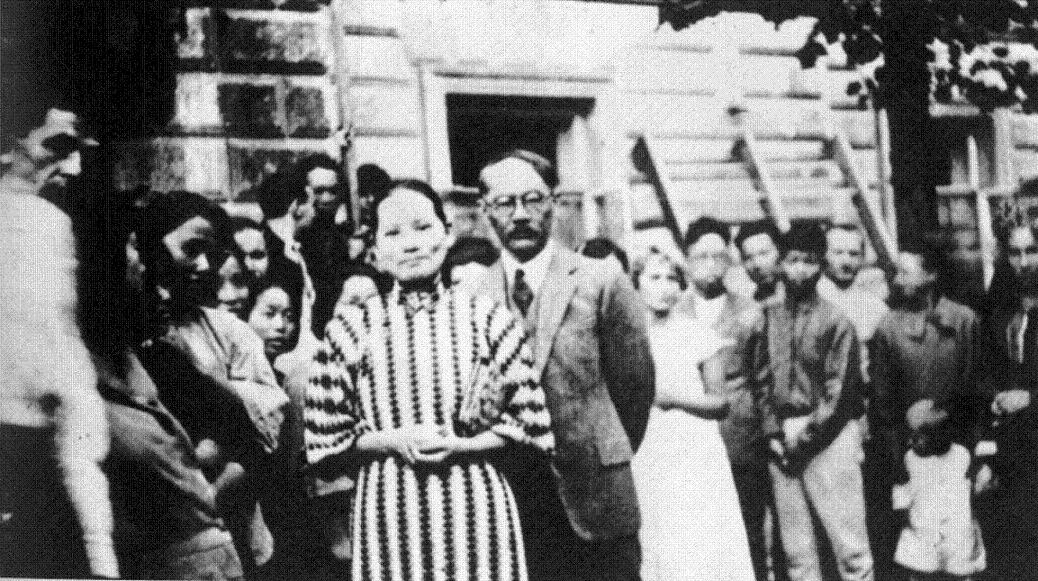
1927 Chen and Soong Qingling at Moscow

Life working at Moscow from 1928 was far from easy. After an initial warm public reception, Joseph Stalin showed little tolerance for living symbols of the Soviet failure in China. Chen was frustrated at the Russians attempting to establish a leftist Chinese front, and soon left Moscow. After a period of exile he went to Hong Kong before being appointed foreign minister. He was reported in 1931 as favouring direct negotiation with Japan over the Mukden Incident and subsequent invasion of Manchuria, stating "We believe in recognising facts, and Japan's position in Manchuria is a fact." After brief service with governments in China which challenged the Nanking government, Chen was finally expelled from the Kuomintang for serving as foreign minister in the Fukien Rebellion of 1934. He again headed to Europe for refuge at Paris, but returned to Hong Kong. He was taken to Shanghai in the spring of 1942 in hopes of persuading him to support the Japanese puppet government, but he remained loudly critical of that "pack of liars" until his death in May, 1944, at the age of 66.

== Personal life ==
In 1899, Chen married Agatha Alphosin Ganteaume (1878–1926), known as Aisy, a French Creole whose wealthy father owned one of the largest estates in Trinidad. They had eight children, four of whom survived childhood: Percy Chen (1901–1986), a Hong Kong lawyer; Sylvia (Silan) Chen (1905–1996), a dancer; Yolanda (Yulen) Chen (1913–2006), a Soviet Union camerawoman; and Jack Chen (1908–1995), a British artist and journalist who worked for Peking Review until 1971 when he left China for the US via Hong Kong. In 1958 Jack married Chen Yuan-tsung, who became a writer after they had relocated to the US. Eugene Chen had a grandson, Jay, a physicist, born to Jack; and a great-granddaughter, Yolanda, an athlete, born to Yevgeniy.

Aisy died of breast cancer in May 1926. Chen and his second wife, Georgette Chen, married in 1930 and remained together until his death in 1944.

== See also ==
- Fujian People's Government

== Sources ==
- Percy Chen, China called Me: My Life Inside the Chinese Revolution. Boston: Little Brown, 1979. 423p. ISBN 0316138495. A memoir by Eugene Chen's son, including accounts of his father's activities in 1920s politics and the automobile caravan from China to Moscow in 1927.
- Yuan-Tsung Chen. Return to the Middle Kingdom: One Family, Three Revolutionaries, and the Birth of Modern China. New York: Union Square Press, 2008. ISBN 9781402756979. Google Books A memoir by Jack Chen's wife which intertwines family and national history from the early 1900s to the end of the 20th century.
- Si-lan Chen Leyda, Footsteps to History (New York: Dance Horizons, 1984). A memoir by Eugene Chen's daughter of her life in international dance, including study in the Soviet Union.
  - Reviewed by Renée Renouf at JSTOR
- 钱玉莉 (Yuli Qian), 陈友仁传 (Chen Youren Zhuan) (Shijiazhuang: Hebei ren min chu ban she, 1999 ISBN 7202026716).
- "Roots and Branches," (website of J. Acham-Chen (Eugene Chen's grandson)
- Colonial Office No. 36535/1927 15 February 1927, including: 1) Copy secret despatch of 20 January from Governor of Trinidad furnishing particulars regarding family of Mr. Ch’en who was for a long time resident in the colony; Minutes (i.e. Notes): “This record does not inspire confidence in Mr. Chen, who I should think will prove to be one of the ephemeral phenomena of Chinese politics”; Very much of an adventurer in type. 2) “Report,: H.A. Byatt, Governor [Trinidad]; 3) “Note supplied by Mr. H. Noble Hall, one time correspondent of the Times at Washington on the early career and character of Chen in Trinidad”; 3) Cutting from “Far Eastern Times, by W. Sheldon Ridge; “Life Story of Eugene Chen” (furnished by American Legation, July 1927).
- Chen, Eugene (19 January 1927). "Terms of the Nationalists". The Daily Express. p. 1.
