= People of the Cumberland =

- Publicity still from People of the Cumberland
- Directed by: Sidney Meyers and Jay Leyda
- Written by: Erskine Caldwell
- Produced by: Frontier Films
- Narrated by: Richard Blaine
- Cinematography: Ralph Steiner
- Music by: Alex North
- Production company: Frontier Films
- Distributed by: Garrison Films
- Release date: June 2, 1938 (U.S.)
- Running time: 18 minutes
- Country: United States
- Language: English

People of the Cumberland is a 1938 short film directed by Sidney Meyers and Jay Leyda and produced by Frontier Films. The film is designed to support the U.S. labor union movement and it mixes non-fiction filmmaking and dramatic re-enactments.

== Plot ==
The film takes place in rural Tennessee, where communities have experienced economic and environmental devastation created by the coal mining industry. The introduction of the Highlander Folk School in 1931 by educator Myles Horton and the movement to bring labor union representation to the region are shown as means of empowering the population. Efforts are made to stop the union activities with the murder of a local organizer, but eventually the union movement is able to take root with the local workforce.

== Production ==
People of the Cumberland was part of a series of motion pictures created by Frontier Films, a collective of documentary filmmakers who focused on subjects relating to political and economic hardship. The collective originally began in 1931 as part of the New York branch of the Workers' Film and Photo League before regrouping as Frontier Films in 1937. The collective focused on short films and disbanded in 1942 after producing its only feature-length production, Native Land.

People of the Cumberland's two directors, Sidney Meyers and Jay Leyda, used the pseudonyms "Robert Stebbins" and "Eugene Hill" for their screen credit; Elia Kazan served as assistant director.

The film used actors to recreate the April 30, 1933, murder of Barney Graham, president of the local United Mine Workers. Other events depicted in the film, including square dancing at the Highlander Folk School and a Fourth of July rally at La Follette, Tennessee, used the actual residents of the Cumberland region.

== Reception ==
When People of the Cumberland had its New York theatrical premiere in 1938, film critic Frank S. Nugent of The New York Times dismissed it by calling it "a propaganda film–rather than a documentary...it doesn't carry much conviction as propaganda and not much weight as a film."

Film historian Russell Campbell, in his book Cinema Strikes Back: Radical Filmmaking in the United States 1930-1942, criticized the film's People's Front ideology and argued that "square dancing and hog calling, delightful as they are, are no substitute for serious political thinking." In contrast, William Alexander, in his book Film on the Left, writes, "it is remarkably tight, engaging, and warming, and I think perhaps the best gauged of all Frontier Films to reach its audience. It remains a film of subtlety and high skill, one of the best progressive films produced in the thirties."
