= Joseph Strick =

American film director (1923–2010)

Joseph Ezekiel Strick (July 6, 1923 – June 1, 2010) was an American director, producer, and screenwriter.

== Life and career ==
Born in the Greater Pittsburgh town of Braddock, Pennsylvania, Strick briefly attended UCLA, then enrolled in the U.S. Army during World War II. In the Army, he served as a cameraman in the Army Air Forces.

In 1948, he and Irving Lerner produced Muscle Beach. For several years in the 1950s, Lerner, Strick, Ben Maddow, and Sidney Meyers worked part-time on the experimental documentary The Savage Eye (1959).

Strick was also a successful businessman, founding Electrosolids Corp (1956), Computron Corp. (1958), Physical Sciences Corp (1958), and Holosonics Corp. (1960). In 1977, he invented the usage of six-axis motion simulators as entertainment systems and applied it to machines used now in Disney theme parks as "Star Tours."

In the 1960s, during his first marriage, Strick commissioned what was the only house designed by Oscar Niemeyer in North America. The marriage ended in divorce before construction was completed, and Strick never occupied the house, located on the edge of Santa Monica Canyon.

The Savage Eye won the BAFTA Flaherty Documentary Award and was hailed as part of an "American New Wave" alongside the work of Shirley Clarke and John Cassavetes. In 1970, he won an Academy Award for Best Documentary for his movie Interviews with My Lai Veterans. His better known ventures include a film adaptation of James Joyce's Ulysses and A Portrait of the Artist as a Young Man as well as Never Cry Wolf (1983). He also directed Tropic of Cancer, based on the novel by Henry Miller.

In Britain, he directed at the Royal Shakespeare Company (1964) and the National Theatre (2003).

He died in a Paris hospital of congestive heart failure.

The moving image collection of Joseph Strick is held at the Academy Film Archive. The collection consists of over 100 items, including negative and print materials. The Academy Film Archive has preserved several of Strick's films, including The Savage Eye and Muscle Beach.
