= Federal pardons in the United States =

Power of the president of the United States

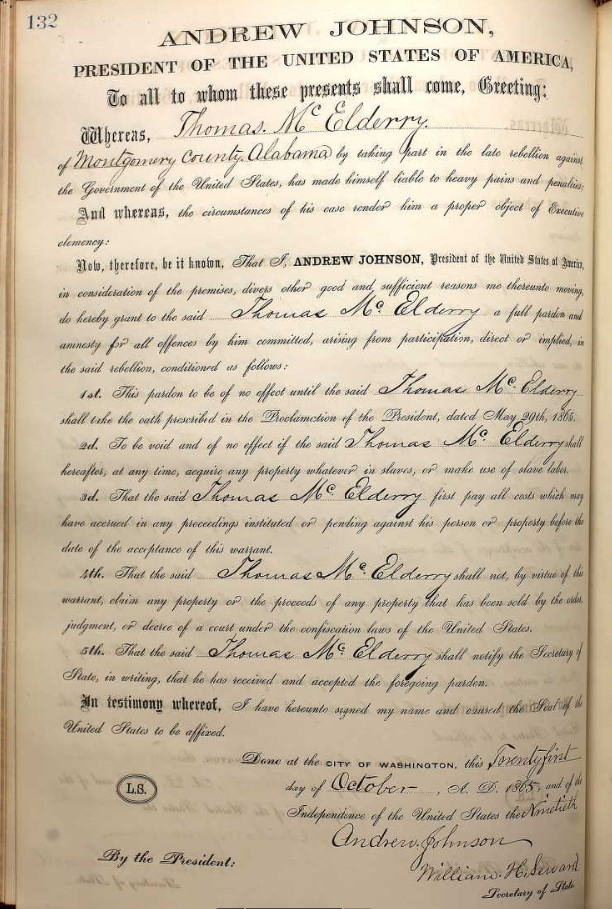
An example of a 19th century ex-confederate pardon, issued by President Andrew Johnson to Thomas McElderry

In the United States, federal pardons are granted only by the president, pursuant to authority under the U.S. Constitution to grant "reprieves and pardons for offenses against the United States". Pardons extend to all federal criminal offenses, except in cases of impeachment, and entail various forms of clemency, including commuting or postponing a sentence, remitting a fine or restitution, delaying the imposition of a punishment, and providing amnesty to an entire group or class of individuals. The pardon power extends to cases involving courts-martial against members of the United States Armed Forces.

The president may grant pardons on their own accord or in response to requests made through the U.S. Department of Justice's Office of the Pardon Attorney. The Pardon Attorney investigates and reviews applications for clemency but serves only an advisory role; the president may disregard the findings. The pardon power is considered "plenary" and thus generally cannot be restricted or modified by Congress or the judiciary. In Ex parte Garland (1867), the U.S. Supreme Court confirmed the "unlimited" nature of federal pardons (except for impeachment cases) and broadened its scope to include offenses for which legal proceedings have not been initiated. Pardons have been used for presumptive cases, most notably when President Gerald Ford pardoned Richard Nixon over any possible crimes connected with the Watergate scandal; the legal effect of such "open pardons" has not been determined by the judiciary. In Burdick v. United States (1915), the Supreme Court held that a pardon does not take effect if the defendant does not accept it.

== Constitutional basis ==
The pardon power of the president is based on Article II, Section 2, Clause 1 of the U.S. Constitution, which provides:

The President ... shall have Power to grant Reprieves and Pardons for Offenses against the United States, except in Cases of impeachment.

The U.S. Supreme Court has interpreted the provision to include the power to grant pardons, conditional pardons, commutations of sentence, conditional commutations of sentence, remissions of fines and forfeitures, respites and amnesties.

== Definitions ==
- A pardon is an executive order granting clemency for a conviction. It may be granted "at any time" after the commission of the crime. As per Justice Department regulations, convicted persons may only apply five or more years after their sentence has been completed. However, the president's power to pardon is not restricted by any temporal constraints except that the crime must have been committed. A pardon is an expression of the president's forgiveness and ordinarily is granted in recognition of the applicant's acceptance of responsibility for the crime and established good conduct for a significant period of time after conviction or completion of sentence. It does not signify innocence. Its practical effect is the restoration of civil rights and reversal or elimination of statutory disabilities of, e.g., firearm rights, occupational licensing, etc., associated with or caused or occasioned by a past criminal conviction. In rarer cases, such as the pardon of Richard Nixon, a pardon can also halt criminal proceedings or investigations and prevent an indictment, though this has not been tested in court.
- A reprieve is a temporary postponement of a punishment (refer to Pardon § Related concepts).
- A commutation is the mitigation of the sentence of someone currently serving a sentence for a crime pursuant to a conviction, without cancelling the conviction itself.

== History ==
=== Origins and background ===
The concept of governments having the authority to provide relief from criminal punishment has deep and broader historical roots, including in ancient Jewish, Greek, and Roman legal principles and practice. The U.S. Constitution's pardon power originated from longstanding English tradition, which permitted the monarch to exercise the "royal prerogative of mercy" to withdraw or provide alternatives to death sentences. The first known "prerogative of mercy" was issued by King Ine of Wessex (688–725), and during the reign of King Henry VIII (1509–1547), it was formally declared by parliament as an exclusive right of the Crown. By the 18th century, the power had been restricted by parliament, enabling it to address potential abuses, but retained its broad application, including in the American colonies. The framers of the U.S. Constitution were directly influenced by the English practice.

Alexander Hamilton defended the pardon power in The Federalist Papers, particularly in Federalist No. 74, where he argued that such a power "should be as little as possible fettered or embarrassed" to ensure "easy access to exceptions in favour of unfortunate guilt." Hamilton also argued that placing power solely with the President would lead to its most beneficial exercise, as a single person would be "a more eligible dispenser of the mercy of the government than a body of men" who "might often encourage each other in an act of obduracy, and might be less sensible to the apprehension of suspicion or censure for an injudicious or affected clemency."

Given the historical precedent, the 1787 Constitutional Convention saw little debate on whether to enshrine a pardon power; neither the Virginia nor New Jersey plan, which concerned the structure of the new government, addressed pardons. Rather, most discussions and disagreements centered on how and where presidential pardons would be exercised. Hamilton proposed amendments to the Virginia Plan that would vest the pardon power in an "Executive authority" that could be exercised over "all offences except Treason," with a pardon for treason requiring approval by the Senate. The first report of the Committee of Detail proposed allowing the president to grant "reprieves and pardons", with the only exception being that a pardon would "not be pleadable in bar of an impeachment", which was similar to English restrictions on royal pardons.

Virginia delegate Edmund Randolph submitted a motion to reincorporate an exception to cases of treason, on the basis that extending pardons to such instances "was too great a trust," that the President "may himself be guilty," and that the "Traytors may be his own instruments." During the Virginia Ratifying Convention, fellow Virginia delegate George Mason likewise argued against ratification partly on the grounds that "the President ought not to have the power of pardoning, because he may frequently pardon crimes which were advised by himself", which eventually "establish a monarchy, and destroy the republic." James Wilson of Pennsylvania countered that if the President were himself involved in treasonous conduct, he could be impeached. Responding to Randolph's motion, James Madison expressed that the Senate should be consulted for pardons that concerned treason; Roger Sherman submitted a separate proposal requiring Senate consent for all pardons, while making presidential reprieves applicable only until the subsequent Senate session. Randolph's motion was ultimately defeated by an 8–2 vote (with one divided), while Sherman's motion was defeated by a vote of 8–1.

==== Early history ====
The pardon power was first used by George Washington in 1795, when he gave amnesty to participants of the Whiskey Rebellion. Pardons were subsequently issued for a wide variety of convictions and crimes. Thomas Jefferson granted amnesty to any citizen convicted of a crime under the Alien and Sedition Acts. Abraham Lincoln used clemency during the U.S. Civil War to encourage desertions from the Confederate Army; in 1868, his successor, Andrew Johnson, pardoned Jefferson Davis, the former president of the Confederacy, which was perhaps the most controversial pardon up to that point.

Until Grover Cleveland's first term (1885–1889), pardons were handwritten by the president; after typewriters came to be used for regular White House business, pardons were prepared for the president by administrative staff, requiring only that the president sign them.

=== Modern process ===
An example of a modern pardon, issued by President Donald Trump

All federal pardon petitions are addressed to the president, who grants or denies the request. Typically, applications for pardons are referred for review and non-binding recommendation by the Office of the Pardon Attorney, an official of the United States Department of Justice. The number of pardons and reprieves granted has varied from administration to administration. Fewer pardons have been granted since World War II.

A federal pardon can be issued prior to the start of a legal case or inquiry, prior to any indictments being issued, for unspecified offenses, and prior to or after a conviction for a federal crime. President Gerald R. Ford's broad federal pardon of former president Richard M. Nixon in 1974 for "all offenses against the United States which he, Richard Nixon, has committed or may have committed or taken part in during the period from January 20, 1969 through August 9, 1974" is a notable example of a fixed-period federal pardon that came prior to any indictments being issued and that covered unspecified federal offenses that may or may not have been committed. The legal effectiveness of such a form of pardon (an "open pardon") has not been tested in court.

The Justice Department normally requires that anyone filing a petition for a pardon wait five years after conviction or release prior to receiving a pardon. However, this policy does not bind or restrict the president's power.

While clemency may be granted without the filing of a formal request, in most cases the Office of the Pardon Attorney will consider only petitions from persons who have completed their sentences and, in addition, have demonstrated their ability to lead a responsible and productive life for a significant period after conviction or release from confinement.

The Supreme Court ruled in United States v. Wilson (1833) that a pardon could be rejected by the convict. In Burdick v. United States (1915), the court specifically said: "Circumstances may be made to bring innocence under the penalties of the law. If so brought, escape by confession of guilt implied in the acceptance of a pardon may be rejected, preferring to be the victim of the law rather than its acknowledged transgressor, preferring death even to such certain infamy." Commutations (reduction in prison sentence), unlike pardons (restoration of civil rights after prison sentence had been served) may not be refused. In Biddle v. Perovich 274 U.S. 480 (1927), the subject of the commutation did not want to accept life in prison but wanted the death penalty restored. The Supreme Court said, "Just as the original punishment would be imposed without regard to the prisoner's consent and in the teeth of his will, whether he liked it or not, the public welfare, not his consent, determines what shall be done."

=== Limitations ===
Federal pardons issued by the president apply only to federal crimes; they do not apply to state or local crimes or to private civil lawsuits. Pardons for state crimes are handled by governors or a state pardon board.

The president's power to grant pardons explicitly does not apply "in cases of impeachment." This means that the president cannot use a pardon to stop an officeholder from being impeached, or to undo the effects of an impeachment and conviction.

==== Acceptance by the recipient ====
In United States v. Wilson (1833), the U.S. Supreme Court held that a pardon can be rejected by the intended recipient and must be affirmatively accepted to be officially recognized by the courts. In that case, George Wilson was convicted of robbing the US Mail and was sentenced to death. Because of his friends' influence, Wilson was pardoned by President Andrew Jackson, but Wilson refused the pardon and the Supreme Court held that his rejection was valid and the court could not force a pardon upon him; and consequently the pardon must be introduced to the court by "plea, motion, or otherwise" to be considered as a point of fact and evidence.

According to Associate Justice Joseph McKenna, writing the majority opinion in the U.S. Supreme Court case Burdick v. United States, a pardon is "an imputation of guilt and acceptance of a confession of it." Federal courts have yet to make it clear how this logic applies to persons who are deceased (such as Henry Ossian Flipper, who was pardoned by Bill Clinton), those who are relieved from penalties as a result of general amnesties, and those whose punishments are relieved via a commutation of sentence (which cannot be rejected in any sense of the language). Brian Kalt, a law professor at Michigan State University, states that presidents sometimes (albeit rarely) grant pardons on the basis of innocence, and argues that if a president issues a pardon because they think an individual is innocent, then accepting that pardon would not be an admission of guilt.

==== Residual effects of convictions ====
A presidential pardon restores various rights lost as a result of the pardoned offense and may lessen to some extent the stigma arising from a conviction, but it does not erase or expunge the record of the conviction itself. Therefore, a person who is granted a pardon must still disclose any convictions on any form where such information is required although the person may also disclose the fact that a pardon was received. Also, as most civil disabilities arising from a criminal conviction, such as loss of the right to vote and hold state public office, are imposed by state rather than federal law, they may be removed only by state action.

==== Self-pardons ====
The legal and constitutional ability of a president to pardon himself or herself (self-pardon) is an unresolved issue. During the Watergate scandal and shortly before the Richard Nixon's resignation, Nixon's lawyer suggested that a self-pardon would be legal but the Office of Legal Counsel (OLC) issued an opinion that concluded that a President may not self-pardon "[u]nder the fundamental rule that no one may be a judge in his own case". The 1974 memo laid out a scenario in which, under the Twenty-fifth Amendment to the United States Constitution, the president could declare himself unable to perform his duties and could appoint the vice president as acting president. The acting president could then pardon the president and "thereafter the president could either resign or resume the duties of his office." The informal Nixon memo only addressed the presidential self-pardon in 69 words with no citations and lacks legal analysis, and is thus not authoritative on the issue. The issue arose again in 1998, during the impeachment of President Bill Clinton.

On July 22, 2017, President Donald Trump tweeted, "While all agree the U.S. President has the complete power to pardon, why think of that when only crime so far is LEAKS against us. FAKE NEWS", prompting a series of news articles and online commentary regarding the president's ability to pardon relatives, aides, and possibly even himself in relation to the 2017 Special Counsel investigation, which ultimately concluded President Donald Trump could not be indicted at the time. The New York Times reported that during Trump's closing days in office he told aides he was considering pardoning himself.

===== Constitutionality of self-pardon =====
Common arguments against self-pardons include the themes of self-judging and self-dealing, the unjust nature of the president being above the law, violations of the public trust, the inclusion of the word "grant" in the relevant clause (one cannot grant something to oneself), the definition of "pardon" (because one cannot grant forgiveness to oneself), and the inadequacy of other safeguards such as political consequences. However, such arguments have been disputed, and since the Supreme Court has issued constitutional rulings that affirmed the president's "unlimited" pardon power, a constitutional amendment or a Supreme Court decision on a self-pardon would be required to settle the constitutionality of a self-pardon.

Constitutional issues of the pardon power have been raised in multiple Supreme Court cases. In Ex parte Garland, the Supreme Court majority ruled:

The power thus conferred is unlimited, with the exception stated. It extends to every offence known to the law, and may be exercised at any time after its commission, either before legal proceedings are taken, or during their pendency, or after conviction and judgment. This power of the President is not subject to legislative control. Congress can neither limit the effect of his pardon, nor exclude from its exercise any class of offenders. The benign prerogative of mercy reposed in him cannot be fettered by any legislative restrictions.

In Marbury v. Madison, Chief Justice John Marshall wrote regarding the presidential powers:

[T]he President is invested with certain important political powers ... [for] which he is to use his own discretion, and is accountable only to his country in his political character, and to his own conscience[.] ... [W]hatever opinion may be entertained of the manner in which executive discretion may be used, still there exists, and can exist, no power to control that discretion[.] ... [T]he decision of the executive is conclusive.

However, Laurence Tribe, Richard Painter, and Norm Eisen have suggested that presidential self-pardons are precluded by the Impeachment Disqualification Clause of Article I, Section III, while Philip Bobbitt and other legal scholars have suggested that self-pardons would be precluded by the requirement that the President "shall take Care that the Laws be faithfully executed" in Article II, Section III or by the Due Process Clauses of the 5th Amendment and the 14th Amendment. The Impeachment Disqualification Clause states "Judgment in Cases of Impeachment shall not extend further than to removal from Office, and disqualification to hold and enjoy any Office of honor, Trust or Profit under the United States: but the Party convicted shall nevertheless be liable and subject to Indictment, Trial, Judgment and Punishment, according to Law." The Department of Justice Office of Legal Counsel (OLC) issued an opinion in 2000 that concluded that it is constitutional to indict and try a former president for the same offenses for which the President was impeached by the House of Representatives and acquitted by the Senate.

=== Controversial use ===
The pardon power was controversial from the outset; many Anti-Federalists remembered examples of royal abuses of the pardon power in Europe, and warned that the same would happen in the new republic. Critics such as the Anti-Federalists have argued that pardons have been used more often for the sake of political expediency than to correct judicial error.

In the 18th century, George Washington granted the first high-profile federal pardon to leaders of the Whiskey Rebellion on his final day in office.

In the 19th century, Andrew Johnson controversially issued sweeping pardons of thousands of former Confederate officials and military personnel after the American Civil War.

In the 20th century, Gerald Ford pardoned former president Richard Nixon on September 8, 1974, for official misconduct which gave rise to the Watergate scandal. Polls showed a majority of Americans disapproved of the pardon, and Ford's public-approval ratings tumbled afterward.

Other publicly controversial uses of the pardon power include Jimmy Carter's grant of amnesty to Vietnam-era draft dodgers on his second day in office, January 21, 1977; George H. W. Bush's pardons of 75 people, including six Reagan administration officials accused or convicted in connection with the Iran–Contra affair; and Bill Clinton's commutation of sentences for 16 members of FALN in 1999.

In the 21st century, Clinton's pardons of 140 people on his last day in office, January 20, 2001, including billionaire fugitive Marc Rich and his own half-brother, Roger Clinton, were heavily criticized.

President Donald Trump issued his first pardon to former Arizona sheriff Joe Arpaio on August 25, 2017; Arpaio had been convicted of criminal contempt in federal court. The pardon of Arpaio was relatively unusual in being issued early in Trump's presidency. It was met with widespread criticism from political opponents. On November 25, 2020, Trump announced, via Twitter, that he had pardoned his former National Security Advisor, retired General Michael Flynn. Flynn had pleaded guilty to one count of making false statements to the FBI, an offense which prompted Trump to fire Flynn as his national security advisor 23 days after taking office. On December 23, 2020, Trump pardoned 26 friends and allies, including his longtime ally Roger Stone, former campaign chairman Paul Manafort, and Charles Kushner, his son-in-law's father.

On December 1, 2024, during his lame-duck period, President Joe Biden issued a "full and unconditional pardon" to his son Hunter Biden who had been convicted on federal gun and tax evasion charges. The pardon also included any potential federal crimes that Hunter Biden may have committed "from January 1, 2014 through December 1, 2024". This was a reversal of his previous promises that he would not use his clemency powers for his son. In his statement, he said that Hunter had been "selectively, and unfairly, prosecuted."

In December 2024, President Joe Biden commuted the sentences of 37 out of 40 individuals on federal death row, reducing their punishments to life imprisonment.

On January 20, 2025, mere hours before his administration ended, President Joe Biden pardoned former NIAID director Anthony Fauci, retired general Mark Milley, and members of the House Select Committee that investigated the January 6 United States Capitol attack of 2021. In his last minutes in office, Biden also pardoned an additional five members of his family consisting of his younger brother James Biden and his wife Sara, younger brother Francis, as well as his younger sister Valerie Biden Owens and her husband John Owens. Biden stated that these final pardons were done to protect the pardoned individuals from retribution by the incoming Trump administration, not because the individuals had done anything wrong.

Also on January 20, 2025, newly inaugurated president Donald Trump issued a mass pardon to 1,600 persons accused and convicted of illegal actions on January 6, without input from the U.S. Office of the Pardon Attorney. According to the April 7, 2025, testimony of Elizabeth Oyer, Pardon Attorney at the time, "That's not something we were asked to do in that context, and, in fact, it's not something that the Office as of the time of my departure had been asked to do at all in the context of clemency grants by this administration." Although presidents are not mandated to consult with the Pardon Attorney when issuing clemency, the violent nature of many January 6 indictments, coupled with the criminal histories of those accused and convicted, has led the U.S. Senate Committee on the Judiciary to formally question the Department of Justice, the latter being under the direction of Pamela Bondi, to ask if the department is violating its own guidelines—and failing to ensure public safety—by facilitating these pardons.

In mid-March 2025, President Trump challenged the validity of some of predecessor Joe Biden's pardons, falsely claiming they were invalidated because he allegedly used autopen.

==== Allegations of monetized clemency during Donald Trump's presidency ====
During the final months of President Donald Trump's first term, multiple news outlets reported allegations and investigations concerning attempts to obtain presidential clemency through political contributions or paid access to individuals claiming influence over the White House clemency process.

===== Allegations involving Rudy Giuliani and a $2 million figure =====
In May 2023, The Washington Post reported that a lawsuit filed by Noelle Dunphy (a former associate of Rudy Giuliani) alleged Giuliani told her he was "selling pardons for $2 million" and that he and Trump would split the proceeds. The same reporting noted Giuliani's attorneys said he denied the allegations described in the lawsuit.

Separately, in January 2021, The Guardian reported (citing a report by The New York Times) that former CIA officer John Kiriakou said an associate of Giuliani told him a Trump pardon would "cost $2m"; Kiriakou said he declined, and the report said the matter was relayed to federal authorities.

===== Department of Justice "bribery-for-pardon" investigation =====
In December 2020, Reuters reported that the U.S. Department of Justice was investigating a potential crime related to funneling money to the White House in exchange for a presidential pardon, after Chief U.S. District Judge Beryl A. Howell partially unsealed a heavily redacted court opinion describing what she called a "bribery-for-pardon" investigation. Reuters reported the opinion described an alleged scheme in which someone would offer a "substantial political contribution" in exchange for a presidential pardon or reprieve, and also referenced a "secret lobbying scheme" involving efforts to lobby senior White House officials without complying with Lobbying Disclosure Act registration requirements.

TIME (crediting Bloomberg reporters) similarly reported the unsealed court document described an alleged attempt to purchase clemency through political contributions, and that the Justice Department also examined whether unnamed individuals acted as unregistered lobbyists to White House officials in connection with clemency-seeking efforts. Both Reuters and Courthouse News Service reported that a Justice Department official said no government official was a subject or target of the investigation described in the unsealed filing, and the publicly available documents did not identify the individuals involved.

===== Summary of status as reported =====
Reporting on the above matters described them as allegations and/or investigations; the identities of the relevant subjects were not fully public in the unsealed materials, and outlets noted no public charging announcement tied to the redacted "bribery-for-pardon" inquiry at the time of the reporting.

== Symbolic use ==
A symbolic use of the presidential pardon is the National Thanksgiving Turkey Presentation in November, in which a domestic turkey is exempted from being slaughtered for Thanksgiving dinner and is allowed to live out its natural life on a farm.

== See also ==
- List of people pardoned or granted clemency by the president of the United States
