= Film censorship in the United States =

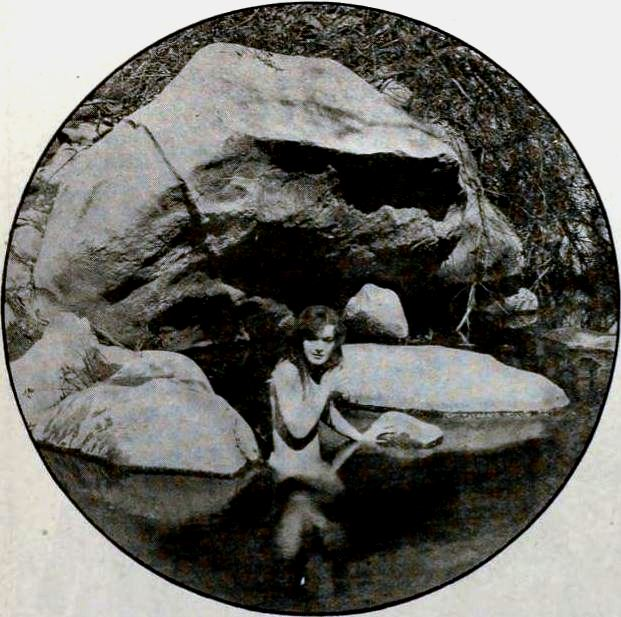
This scene from The Branding Iron (1920) was cut by the Pennsylvania film censorship board, which then banned the film for its topic of infidelity.

Film censorship in the United States was a frequent feature of the industry almost from the beginning of the U.S. motion picture industry until the end of strong self-regulation in 1966. Court rulings in the 1950s and 1960s severely constrained government censorship, though statewide regulation lasted until at least the 1980s.

== State and local censorship, from pre-code to post-code ==
Complaints from government authorities about film content date back at least as far as what was probably the first appearance of a woman in a motion picture in the United States, resulting in local self-censorship of the 1894 silent film Carmencita.

Laws authorizing censorship of film in the United States began with an 1897 Maine statute prohibiting the exhibition of prizefight films; the state enacted the statute to prevent the exhibition of the 1897 heavyweight championship between James J. Corbett and Bob Fitzsimmons. Other states followed Maine's example.

Chicago enacted the first censorship ordinance in the United States in 1907, authorizing its police chief to screen all films to determine whether they should be permitted on screens. Detroit followed with its own ordinance the same year. When upheld in a court challenge in 1909, other cities followed.

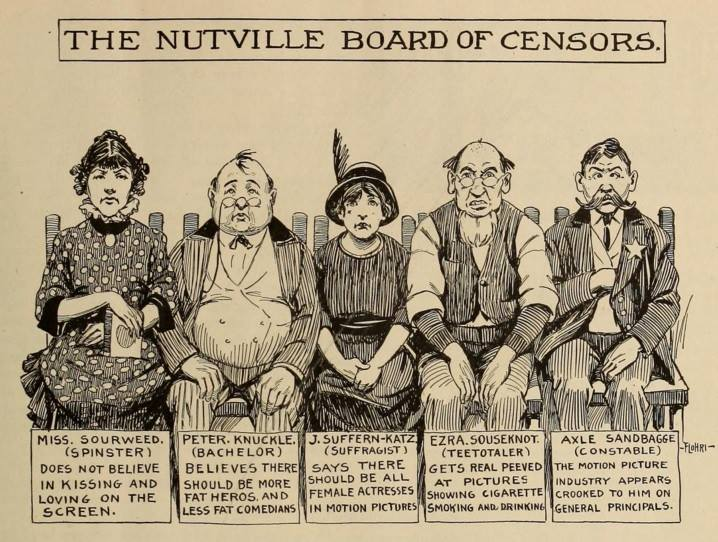
"The Nutville Board of Censors" by Emil Flohri, 1917

An initial attempt at national censorship was made in New York City, with the establishment of the National Board of Censorship of Motion Pictures, a subdivision of the People's Institute, a progressive era educational and lecture bureau. Members of a volunteer force of 135 met daily in the office of a New York film maker to screen multiple reels of film, with work groups of 5 participating in as many as 20 film sessions a week.

Cuts of material deemed objectionable — either for reasons of morals, violence, or advocacy of crime — were forced, or in some cases films banned outright. Lists of approved movies sent out weekly to a mailing list of 400, said to control 16,000 of the nation's 17,000 theaters. From its establishment in 1909 until September 1914, the organization claimed to have reviewed 7,576 movies and to have forced the withdrawal of 53 films and to have caused content deletions in 401 others. The body was directed by a national board of 33, operating with a $15,000 annual budget.

Pennsylvania became the first to enact statewide censorship of movies in 1911, although it did not fund the effort until 1914. This was soon followed by Ohio (1914), Kansas (1915), Maryland (1916), New York (1921) and, finally, Virginia (1922). Eventually, at least one hundred cities across the nation empowered local censorship boards.

In 1915, the US Supreme Court determined in Mutual Film Corporation v. Industrial Commission of Ohio that motion pictures were purely commerce and not an art and so not covered by the First Amendment. This left local, state, and city censorship boards no constitutional impediment to editing or banning films.

This decision was not overturned by the Supreme Court until it heard Joseph Burstyn, Inc. v. Wilson in 1952. Its ruling was popularly referred to as the "Miracle Decision" because it involved the short film "The Miracle", part of Roberto Rossellini's L'Amore anthology film (1948). The Supreme Court's ruling still allowed censorship of "obscene" films, allowing censorship boards to continue under narrower authority until the 1965 decision Freedman v. Maryland ruled that prior restraint of film exhibition without a court order was unconstitutional. The public exhibition of obscene films may still incur legal difficulties after the fact, under the 1973 U.S. Supreme Court Miller v. California decision.

Seven states formed film censorship boards that exercised prior restraint on film exhibition, which both pre-dated and outlasted the Hays Code:

- Massachusetts (under the Commissioner of Public Safety?)
- Pennsylvania State Board of Censors (1914–1956; 1959–1961)
- Ohio Board of Censors (1914–1955)
- Maryland State Board of Censors (1916–1981, the last state board to be abolished)
- Kansas State Board of Review (1915–1966)
- New York State Censorship Board (1921–1965)
- Virginia State Board of Censors (1922–1968)

Hundreds of cities also regulated motion pictures, including Atlanta, Boston, Chicago, Dallas, Detroit, and Memphis.

== Production Code ==
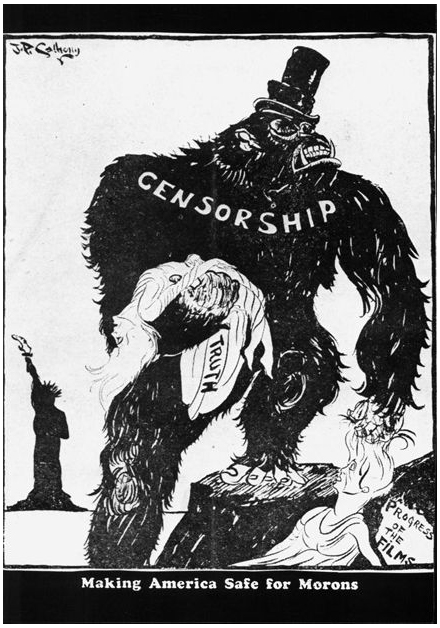
Anti-film censorship cartoon published in The Film Mercury magazine, circa 1926

Public outcry over perceived immorality in Hollywood and the movies, as well as the growing number of city and state censorship boards, led the movie studios to fear that federal regulations were not far off; so they created, in 1922, the Motion Pictures Producers and Distributors Association (which became the Motion Picture Association of America in 1945), an industry trade and lobby organization. The association was headed by Will H. Hays, a well-connected Republican lawyer who had previously been United States Postmaster General; he derailed attempts to institute federal censorship over the movies.

In 1927, Hays compiled a list of subjects, culled from his experience with the various US censorship boards, which he felt Hollywood studios would be wise to avoid. He called this list "the formula" but it was popularly known as the "don'ts and be carefuls" list. In 1930, Hays created the Studio Relations Committee (SRC) to implement his censorship code, but the SRC lacked any real enforcement capability.

The advent of talking pictures in 1927 led to a perceived need for further enforcement. Martin Quigley, publisher of a Chicago-based motion picture trade newspaper, began lobbying for a more extensive code that not only listed material inappropriate for movies, but also contained a moral system that the movies could help promote — specifically a system based on Catholic theology. He recruited Father Daniel Lord, a Jesuit priest and instructor at Catholic Saint Louis University, to write such a code. On March 31, 1930, the board of directors of the Motion Picture Producers and Distributors Association formally adopted it. This original version in particular was once popularly known as the Hays Code, but it and later revisions are now commonly called the Production Code.

Depression economics and changing social mores resulted in the studios producing racier fare that the Code, lacking an aggressive enforcement body, was unable to redress. This era is known as Pre-Code Hollywood. An amendment to the Code, adopted on June 13, 1934, established the Production Code Administration (PCA), and required that all films released on or after July 1, 1934 obtain a certificate of approval before being released. For the three-plus decades that followed, virtually all motion pictures produced in the United States and released by major studios adhered to the Code. The Production Code was not created or enforced by federal, state, or city government. In fact, the Hollywood studios adopted the Code in large part in the hopes of avoiding government censorship, preferring self-regulation to government regulation.

The enforcement of the Production Code led to the dissolution of many local censorship boards. Meanwhile, the US Customs Department prohibited the importation of the Czech film Ecstasy (1933), starring an actress soon to be known as Hedy Lamarr, a prohibition upheld on appeal.

In 1934, Joseph I. Breen was appointed head of the new Production Code Administration (PCA). Under Breen's leadership, until his retirement in 1954, enforcement of the Production Code became rigid and notorious. Breen's power to change scripts and scenes angered many writers, directors, and Hollywood moguls. The PCA had two offices, one in Hollywood, the other in New York City. Films approved by the New York PCA office were issued certificate numbers beginning with zero.

The first major instance of censorship under the Production Code involved the 1934 film Tarzan and His Mate, in which brief nude scenes involving a body double for actress Maureen O'Sullivan were edited out of the master negative of the film. Another famous enforcement case involved the 1943 western The Outlaw, produced by Howard Hughes. The Outlaw was denied a certificate of approval and kept out of theaters for years because the film's advertising focused particular attention on Jane Russell's breasts. Hughes eventually persuaded Breen that the breasts did not violate the Code and the film could be shown.

Some films produced outside the mainstream studio system during this time did flout the conventions of the Code, such as Child Bride (1938), which featured a nude scene involving 12-year-old actress Shirley Mills. Even cartoon sex symbol Betty Boop had to change from being a flapper, and began to wear an old-fashioned housewife skirt.

In 1936, Arthur Mayer and Joseph Burstyn attempted to distribute Whirlpool of Desire, a French film originally titled Remous and directed by Edmond T. Greville. The legal battle lasted until November 1939, when the film was released in the U.S.

In 1952, the U.S. Supreme Court in Joseph Burstyn, Inc. v. Wilson unanimously overruled its 1915 decision and held that motion pictures were entitled to First Amendment protection, so that the New York State Board of Regents could not ban "The Miracle", a short film that was one half of L'Amore (1948), an anthology film directed by Roberto Rossellini. Film distributor Joseph Burstyn released the film in the U.S. in 1950, and the case became known as the "Miracle Decision" due to its connection to Rossellini's film. That in turn reduced the threat of government regulation that justified the Production Code, and the PCA's powers over the Hollywood industry were greatly reduced.

At the forefront of challenges to the Production Code was director Otto Preminger, whose films violated the Code repeatedly in the 1950s. His 1953 film The Moon is Blue, about a young woman who tries to play two suitors off against each other by claiming that she plans to keep her virginity until marriage, was the first film since the pre-code Hollywood days to use the words "virgin", "seduce", and "mistress", and was released without a certificate of approval. Preminger later made The Man with the Golden Arm (1955), which portrayed the prohibited subject of drug abuse, and Anatomy of a Murder (1959) which dealt with rape. Preminger's films were direct assaults on the authority of the Production Code and, since they were successful, hastened its abandonment.

In 1954, Joseph Breen retired and Geoffrey Shurlock was appointed as his successor. Variety noted "a decided tendency towards a broader, more casual approach" in the enforcement of the Code.

Billy Wilder's Some Like It Hot (1959) and Alfred Hitchcock's Psycho (1960) were also released without a certificate of approval due to their themes and became box office hits, further weakening the Code's authority.

=== The Pawnbroker and the end of the Code ===
In the early 1960s, British films such as Victim (1961), A Taste of Honey (1961) and The Leather Boys (1963) offered daring social commentary about gender roles and homophobia that violated the Hollywood Production Code, yet the films were released in the U.S. The American women's rights, gay rights, civil rights, and youth movements prompted a reevaluation of the depiction of themes of race, class, gender, and sexuality that had been restricted by the Code. In addition, the growing popularity of international films with more explicit content helped discredit the Code.

In 1964, The Pawnbroker, directed by Sidney Lumet and starring Rod Steiger, was initially rejected because of two scenes in which actresses Linda Geiser and Thelma Oliver fully expose their breasts, and a sex scene between Oliver and Jaime Sánchez, which it described as "unacceptably sex suggestive and lustful". Despite the rejection, the film's producers arranged for Allied Artists to release the film without the Production Code seal and the New York censors licensed The Pawnbroker without the cuts demanded by Code administrators. The producers also appealed the rejection to the Motion Picture Association of America.

On a 6–3 vote, the MPAA granted the film an "exception" conditional on "reduction in the length of the scenes which the Production Code Administration found unapprovable." The exception to the Code was granted as a "special and unique case", and was described by The New York Times as "an unprecedented move that will not, however, set a precedent." The requested reductions of nudity were minimal, and the outcome was viewed in the media as a victory for the film's producers. The Pawnbroker was the first film since pre-Code era featuring bare breasts to receive Production Code approval. In his 2008 study of films during that era, Pictures at a Revolution, author Mark Harris wrote that the MPAA's action was "the first of a series of injuries to the Production Code that would prove fatal within three years."

When Jack Valenti became President of the MPAA in 1966, he was immediately faced with a problem regarding language in the film version of Edward Albee's play Who's Afraid of Virginia Woolf? (1966). Valenti negotiated a compromise: The word "screw" was removed, but other language, including the phrase "hump the hostess," remained. The film received Production Code approval despite having language that was clearly prohibited. The British-produced, but American-financed, film Blowup (1966) presented a different problem. After the film was denied Production Code approval, MGM released it anyway, the first instance of an MPAA member company distributing a film that did not have an approval certificate. The MPAA could do little about it.

Enforcement had become impossible, and the Production Code was abandoned. The voluntary Motion Picture Association film rating system was adopted in 1968, and is used by participating studios and theaters to prevent children of various ages from seeing certain films.

=== Later efforts ===
The 1982 documentary film If You Love This Planet was officially designated as "foreign political propaganda" by the United States Department of Justice and temporarily banned. It featured excerpts from a lecture by Dr. Helen Caldicott about the effects of nuclear weapons interspersed with shots of the effects of the atomic bombs and scenes from Jap Zero, a military educational film from 1943 featuring Ronald Reagan. The subsequent uproar over that action gave the film a publicity boost, and it later won the 1982 Academy Award for Best Documentary (Short Subject).

== In return for military access ==
As of 2022, the U.S. Department of Defense works with approximately 130 movies, television shows, video games, and documentaries per year. It offers producers access to military bases and loans of military equipment, but in return gets the right to demand script changes and in some cases add talking points. It removes or minimizes references to sexism, racism, war crimes, PTSD, and veteran suicide, and generally acts to portray the military in a positive light. Some movies choose to forgo this cooperation and obtain military hardware or backdrops internally or on the private market. The production of some films is made contingent on military approval by the studio for cost reasons. Changes have included altering the Tony Stark character in Iron Man from being opposed to weaponizing his technology into an arms dealer who sells it to the U.S. military, and deleting a reference to the atomic bombings of Hiroshima and Nagasaki from Godzilla. The Central Intelligence Agency has similar arrangements with some filmmakers.

== Film censors ==
- Joseph Breen
- Lloyd Binford

== See also ==
- Censorship in the United States
- John Hundley, CBS television executive who screened certain performers for sobriety and verified that necklines of women's dresses conformed to the network's standards
- List of banned films
- Motion Picture Association film rating system, the current voluntary system
- Pare Lorentz, American filmmaker who spoke out against censorship in the film industry
