= Virginia State Board of Censors =

Defunct regulatory agency in Virginia

Agency overview
- Formed: August 1, 1922; 104 years ago
- Dissolved: 1968; 58 years ago
- Type: Censorship board
- Jurisdiction: Virginia

The Virginia State Board of Censors was a government agency formed on August 1, 1922 for the purpose of reviewing and licensing films for approval to be screened in the state of Virginia. During the agency's existence its members examined over 52,000 films, over 2,000 of which required edits before approval was given; and another 157 films were rejected entirely, of which only 38 won subsequent approval. The board disbanded in 1968 following a series of U.S. Supreme Court rulings which overturned censorship statutes across the country.

== Background and formation ==
The first ordinance for censorship of motion pictures in the United States was enacted by the city of Chicago in 1907. As many as 100 other metropolitan areas adopted censorship statutes; state governments began to follow suit and in 1922 Virginia became the last of seven states to create its own censorship board, becoming one of the leaders in film censorship in the country. The Virginia General Assembly approved an act on March 15, 1922 "to regulate motion picture films and reels; providing a system of examination, approval and regulation thereof, and of the banners, poster and other like advertising matter used in connection therewith; creating the board of censors; and providing penalties for the violation of this act." Through issuing licenses to filmmakers and distributors, the board sought to limit films the members felt threatened "morality" or films that may cause the "incitement of a crime;" these films often involved depictions of sexual situations and/or race relations. Virginia's statutes were copied verbatim from those of New York's censorship board, but Virginia followed a slightly different mandate not written in the legislation, focusing on racial sensibilities in Virginia.

=== Board Members ===
The Act's second provision detailed the guidelines under which the board's members were selected. The board would be composed of three residents of Virginia "well qualified by education and experience to act as censors under this act," who would be appointed by the governor. Governor Elbert Lee Trinkle appointed the first members of the Board of Censors: Evan Chesterman, a writer and former secretary of the Board of Education; R.C.L. Moncure, a tax collector and former businessman; and Emma Speed Sampson, a Richmond native artist and writer.

In an interview with The Monocle in 1929, Sampson stated: "We only eliminate vulgarities in comic pictures. In fact, we do not cut much from pictures because now the people are broader-minded and every day pictures getting better." This original board would later be abolished then reinstated under the department of law, supervised by the attorney general, but censors remained governor appointed. Positions in censorship boards anywhere in the country became valuable patronage plums awarded by the state's respective governor, and board members often were people with little or no experience in the film industry. Censorship board positions were often held by politically connected women, and no censor appointed in Virginia ever retired from the position, although board members would occasionally step down and be replaced over time. When reviewing films that were particularly controversial, the board sometimes brought in other members of the community to help pass judgment, such public health officials or lawyers.

== Censorship criteria ==
The Board of Censors reviewed three types of films specified in the fifth provision as: Used films (films screened in Virginia prior to the board's formation), "Current event" films (any new narrative film depicting current events), and scientific and educational films. The legislation also required any film to be licensed by the board before being publicly screened, and board certification had to be displayed on screen sometime during its exhibition. The state's legislators believed that sexuality portrayed in films was a potentially dangerous force that threatened racial traditions, economic stability, and the marital bond. As a result, the board focused on the issues of 'morality' and the 'incitement of crime' as criteria for rejecting films and devoted considerable attention to censoring what they considered immoral films; films that typically portrayed sexuality. Films that portrayed interracial socializing, be it sexual or not, and any film that showed interracial tensions of any kind also received considerable criticism from the Board of Censors. The passage of the Racial Integrity Act of 1924 gave the board their justification in censoring depictions of racial mixing. Members of the Board of Censors followed a mandate which, as stated in an annual report, "scrutinized with particular care all films which touch upon the relations existing between whites and blacks. Every scene or subtitle calculated to produce friction between the races is eliminated." Although the board did not explicitly define what material might "produce friction between the races," any film that did not depict segregation to the satisfaction of the board would be subject to major cuts, or rejection "in toto."

== Controversies ==
In most cases of disapproval, the Board of Censors would request certain sections of film prints be cut before license was granted, but these edits often created critical errors in the films in question, such as causing gaps in the story line, miss-matched shots, and problems with synchronization of sound and image in the early days of talkies. Other times the board outright banned entire films from screening regardless of any edits that could be made. In the face of the Racial Integrity Act and a film censorship board, Virginia became a leader in the South for its enhanced progressive image. Virginia and its leading citizens perpetuated a reputation of having friendlier relations than most states in the South, but the state's relations relied upon rigid racial and social control set forth by the dominant white middle and upper classes. The board's efforts were aimed at protecting the lower class from immoral material, but the freedom of speech for all Virginians was at risk because with a film censorship board the state now had the power to regulate the cultural consumption of middle and upper class standards. By policing the boundaries of gender and sexuality, the board, in effect, also policed the boundaries of class.

=== Oscar Micheaux ===
One filmmaker who constantly pushed the limits of Virginia's Board of Censers was Oscar Micheaux. Micheaux was one of several black filmmakers between the 1910s and 1950s who sought to provide black audiences with films made from a black perspective, and he is considered the foremost African American filmmaker of the era.

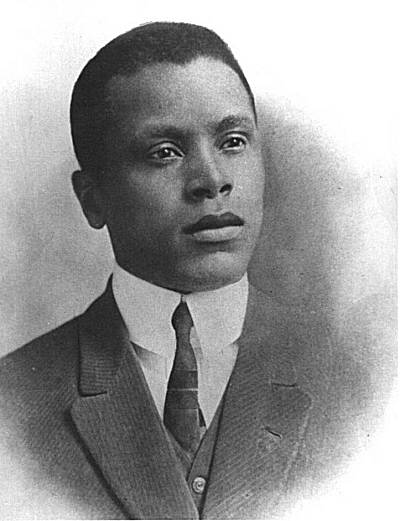
Oscar Micheaux

The Virginia Board of Censors would specifically make sure only stereotypical African American images, such as maids, butlers, and criminals would be portrayed in movies. However, Micheaux's intention with his films was to accurately depict the conditions in which black men lived in the United States. Throughout Micheaux's career the board consistently voiced their distaste for his films. Evan Chesterman wrote in a 1925 report that Micheaux's production company was, "a negro corporation, whose output is designed solely for colored houses, and whose actors, almost without exception, are colored people, has been severely disciplined on account of its infelicitous, not to say dangerous, treatment of the race question." The board's response to Micheaux's films provides a glimpse of their larger administrative agenda of managing race relations under a code of white paternalism and a strict racial etiquette. Micheaux and the Virginia Board of Censors first came at odds over his 1924 film, Birthright. The film first screened in Virginia even though Micheaux never gained approval from the board. Chesterman investigated how this could happen and it turns out Birthright had been screening with a Virginia Board of Censors seal of approval, and he concluded Micheaux must have committed a "deliberate violation of the censorship act" by editing in the seal from a previously approved film. Micheaux never responded to letters from the board, and in response the board fined Micheaux and never reviewed Birthright nor allowed its screening in the state. In July 1924, Micheaux did submit his film, A Son of Satan, to the Virginia Board of Censors for review, which was subsequently rejected. When the filmmaker requested an appeal, the board denied his request citing the way Micheaux failed to respond to the objections of Birthright earlier in the year. The board's specific objections to A Son of Satan stemmed from images of miscegenation and race riots, as well as scenes which caused "blurring of racial lines in public spaces such as dance halls." After paying a fine, making some cuts, and a great deal of confrontation with the members of the board, namely Chesterman, Micheaux's film was eventually licensed to be shown in Virginia. In March 1927, Micheaux's newest film, The House Behind the Cedars, generated controversy among the Board of Censors just as the filmmaker's previous two efforts had, however their ruling on this film sparked debate on the white allegiance to the Racial Integrity Act. The board's report concluded films were not the proper medium for handling sensitive topics involving race, and that The House Behind the Cedars had the potential to incite crime through race riots. Micheaux objected saying the film had been adapted from a book, which had been in circulation for thirty years, and the film had screened across the country without incident. Micheaux once again agreed to make cuts to his film, and the board licensed The House behind the Cedars, but Micheaux only screened the film in Virginia's black theaters.

=== The Birth of a Baby ===
In addition to censoring sexual situations in drama films, the Board of Censors also censored documentary films. Educational films such The Miracle of Life and Girls of the Underworld depicted stories of contraception and the consequences of venereal disease, respectively, and they were both rejected "in toto" by the board for their dramatic portrayals of what were considered sexual taboos. In 1937 Virginia, along with several other states, banned The Birth of a Baby, an educational film sponsored by the American Medical Association and the U.S. Public Health Service, among many other organizations, and looked to educate parents about safe child birth. Virginia's rejection of this film led to the first challenge against a censorship ordinance in the state, which was decided in the Virginia Supreme Court case Lynchburg v. Dominion Theatres of 1940, leading to a rare occurrence of a censorship ordinance being overturned during the time the Board of Censors existed. This would be the last successful overruling of a censorship ordinance until 1965, however the debate over censorship versus the legality of prior restraint began to gain momentum.

== Board disbands ==
In 1952 the U.S. Supreme Court placed movies under First Amendment protection in the ruling of Joseph Burstyn, Inc. v. Wilson, reversing a decision that stood since 1915 and thus overturning any film censorship case to come after. However, some states raised the debate whether censorship was a question of prior restraint, or free speech, and some boards carried on censoring while working through the appeals process. By 1956, Virginia was one of only four states still with censorship boards. After a lengthy legal battle, New York's ban of the film Lady Chatterley's Lover was reversed by the U.S. Supreme Court in 1957, a decision that greatly impacted New York's censorship laws as well those remaining in the other three states, Virginia included. The U.S. Supreme Court case Freedman v. Maryland in 1965 officially overturned the censorship statutes of the remaining censorship boards in the country, and Virginia's State Board of Censors became inactive effective June 30, 1966.

== See also ==
- Film censorship in the United States
