= Saul K. Padover =

American historian

Saul Kussiel Padover
- Born: April 13, 1905; Rozwadów, Austria-Hungary (now Poland)
- Died: February 22, 1981 (aged 75); New York City, New York, U.S.
- Education: Wayne State University Yale University University of Chicago
- Occupations: Historian; Academic
- Spouses: Irina Padover, Peg Fenwick

Saul Kussiel Padover (April 13, 1905 – February 22, 1981) was a historian and political scientist at the New School for Social Research in New York City who wrote biographies of philosophers and politicians such as Karl Marx and Thomas Jefferson.

== Early years and education ==
Padover was born in Rozwadów, then in Austria-Hungary, but now in Poland. He emigrated to the United States in 1920. Padover earned a Bachelor of Arts degree from Wayne State University in Detroit, Michigan. He completed graduate coursework at Yale University in New Haven, Connecticut and received a Master of Arts and in 1932. He later received a Ph.D. from the University of Chicago.

== Civil Service ==
Padover worked in the United States Department of Interior, as a political analyst for the Federal Communications Commission, and as an intelligence officer for the Office of Strategic Services. Padover supervised civilian members of the Psychological Warfare Division (PWD). His service was notable for his leaking the identity of U.S.-appointed mayor of Aachen Franz Oppenhoff; Heinrich Himmler subsequently ordered the assassination of Oppenhoff.

== Academia and writing career ==
Padover wrote editorials for PM, a short-lived liberal newspaper published in New York City.

In 1949, he joined the graduate faculty of The New School. He also directed the General Seminar, the New School's interdisciplinary seminar for faculty.

== Personal life and death ==
Padover was married first to Irina Padover, and following the death of his first wife, to Peg Fenwick, screenwriter of the 1955 film All That Heaven Allows.

Padover died on February 22, 1981.

== Selected works ==
- The Life and Death of Louis XVI. D. Appleton-Century, 1939.
- Jefferson: A Great American's Life and Ideas. Harcourt, Brace, 1942.
- The Complete Jefferson: Containing His Major Writings, Published and Unpublished, Except His Letters. 1,322 pages. Tudor Publishing Company, 1943.
- Experiment in Germany. The Story of an American Intelligence Officer (1946), New York: Duell, Sloane and Pearce
- "Propaganda in World Politics: Psychological Warfare in an Age of World Revolution". Journal of International Affairs. 5 (2). 1951. "26 September 2018 From the Archives: The Special Issue JIA SIPA"
- The Complete Madison. Harper, 1953.
- A Jefferson Profile: As Revealed in His Letters. John Day, 1956.
- Confessions and Self-Portraits. John Day, 1957.
- The Mind of Alexander Hamilton. Harper, 1958.
- The Genius of America. McGraw-Hill, 1960.
- The Meaning of Democracy: An Appraisal of the American Experience. (1963)
- Karl Marx: An Intimate Biography. McGraw-Hill, 1972.
- Sources of Democracy. McGraw-Hill, 1973.
- Karl Marx on American and the Civil War. McGraw-Hill, 1973.
- The Living U.S. Constitution. With Jacob W. Landynski. Signet, 1953.
- Nehru on World History. John Day, 1960. An adaptation of Glimpses of World History by Jawaharlal Nehru.
