= Mary Avara =

American film censor

Member of the Maryland State Board of Censors
- In office 1960–1981
- Appointed by: J. Millard Tawes
- Governor: J. Millard Tawes; Spiro Agnew; Marvin Mandel; Harry Hughes
- Preceded by: Walter S. Ringler
- Succeeded by: Position disestablished

Personal details
- Born: Mary Serio; 1910 Baltimore, Maryland, U.S.
- Died: August 9, 2000 (aged 89–90) Clermont, Florida
- Party: Democratic Party

Mary Avara (née Serio; 1910 - August 9, 2000) was an American film censor who served on the Maryland State Board of Censors from 1960 until the board was disestablished in 1981.

== Biography ==
Mary Avara was born Mary Serio in 1910 in Baltimore, Maryland, to Salvatore Immanuel Serio and Concetta Farace, Italian immigrants from Sicily. She attended St. Peter the Apostle Parochial School until the seventh grade. In 1929, she married Vincent Avara and the couple had two children, Simon Avara and Carmelita Silanskas. He died on December 20, 1946.

After her husband's death, Avara worked as a bail bondsman and organized the 6th District Ladies Civic and Improvement Association, an influential Democratic Party club in Baltimore. She was political allies with Harry McGuirk, Julian Carrick, and J. Millard Tawes. Governor of Maryland Tawes appointed Avara to the Maryland State Board of Censors in 1960, and she served on the board until it was disestablished in 1981. She took office on May 2, 1960, succeeding Walter S. Ringler.

Avara was known as the most outspoken member of the board during her tenure. She feuded with Baltimore-native John Waters over his films, including Pink Flamingos and Female Trouble.

She died on August 9, 2000, in Clermont, Florida.
