= Burdick v. United States =

1915 United States Supreme Court case

- Supreme Court of the United States

Argued December 16, 1914 Decided January 25, 1915
- Full case name: George Burdick v. United States
- Citations: 236 U.S. 79 (more) 35 S. Ct. 267; 59 L. Ed. 476; 1915 U.S. LEXIS 1799

Case history
- Prior: United States v. Burdick, 211 F. 492 (S.D.N.Y. 1914)

Court membership
- Chief Justice Edward D. White Associate Justices Joseph McKenna · Oliver W. Holmes Jr. William R. Day · Charles E. Hughes; Willis Van Devanter · Joseph R. Lamar; Mahlon Pitney · James C. McReynolds

Case opinion
- Majority: McKenna, joined by White, Holmes, Day, Hughes, Van Devanter, Lamar, Pitney
- McReynolds took no part in the consideration or decision of the case.

Burdick v. United States, 236 U.S. 79 (1915), was a case in which the Supreme Court of the United States held that:

- A pardoned person must introduce the pardon into court proceedings, otherwise the pardon is considered a private matter, unknown to and unable to be acted on by the court.
- No formal acceptance is necessary to give effect to the pardons. If a pardon is rejected, it cannot be forced upon its subject.

A pardon is an act of grace, proceeding from the power entrusted with the execution of the laws, which exempts the individual on whom it is bestowed from the punishment the law inflicts for a crime he has committed. It is the private though official act of the executive magistrate, delivered to the individual for whose benefit it is intended ... A private deed, not communicated to him, whatever may be its character, whether a pardon or release, is totally unknown and cannot be acted on.

United States v. Wilson (1833) established that it is possible to reject a (conditional) pardon, even for a capital sentence. Burdick affirmed that the same principle extends to unconditional pardons.

== Background ==
The New York Tribune had reported that a person with political connections was smuggling jewels into the United States in order to avoid paying duties. The Wilson administration knew that the leaked information had to have come from the Customs Service, and suspected that it had been obtained by bribery. A federal grand jury subpoenaed testimony from George Burdick, the city editor, and from shipping news editor William L. Curtin. Burdick and Curtin both took the Fifth and refused to reveal the source of the information. In 1914, Woodrow Wilson issued a blanket pardon to the men in a maneuver to force them to testify, because the Fifth Amendment does not apply if the person is immune from prosecution. They refused to accept the pardon or testify. Burdick was fined $500 and jailed until he complied.

== Decision ==
Justice Joseph McKenna delivered the opinion of the Court in favor of Burdick. The Court ruled Burdick was entitled to reject the pardon for a number of reasons, including the implicit admission of guilt and possibly objectionable terms contained in a conditional pardon. As Burdick was entitled to reject the pardon, he was also entitled to assert his right against self-incrimination under the Fifth Amendment.

Although the Supreme Court's opinion stated that a pardon carries "an imputation of guilt and acceptance of a confession of it", this was part of the Court's dictum for the case. Whether the acceptance of a pardon constitutes an admission of guilt by the recipient is disputed. In Lorance v. Commandant, USDB (2021) the 10th Circuit Court of Appeals ruled that "there is no confession and Lorance does not otherwise lose his right to petition for habeas corpus relief for his court-martial conviction and sentence. The case was remanded for further action not inconsistent with the court's opinion." Also, as reported by PolitiFact, "Brian Kalt, law professor at Michigan State University's College of Law, said that the idea that accepting a pardon is equivalent to admitting guilt is 'based on a widespread misunderstanding' of the Burdick ruling": "It is certainly true that as a practical matter, and a matter of public opinion, a pardon can make the recipient look guilty ... But sometimes people overread Burdick and say that accepting a pardon has some sort of formal legal effect of declaring someone guilty. That is not the case." According to experts, "[s]ometimes presidents use their pardon powers not just to forgive, but to exonerate."

== Later use ==
After President Gerald Ford left the White House in 1977, close friends said that the President privately justified his pardon of Richard Nixon by carrying in his wallet a portion of the text of the Burdick decision, which stated that a pardon carries an imputation of guilt and that acceptance carries a confession of guilt. Ford made reference to the Burdick decision in his post-pardon written statement furnished to the Judiciary Committee of the United States House of Representatives on October 17, 1974. However, the reference related only to the portion of Burdick that supported the proposition that the Constitution does not limit the pardon power to cases of convicted offenders or even indicted offenders.

== See also ==
- List of United States Supreme Court cases, volume 236
