= Pardon of Richard Nixon =

1974 proclamation by U.S. President Gerald Ford

- Presidential Proclamation 4311 of September 8, 1974, by President Gerald R. Ford granting a pardon to Richard M. Nixon.

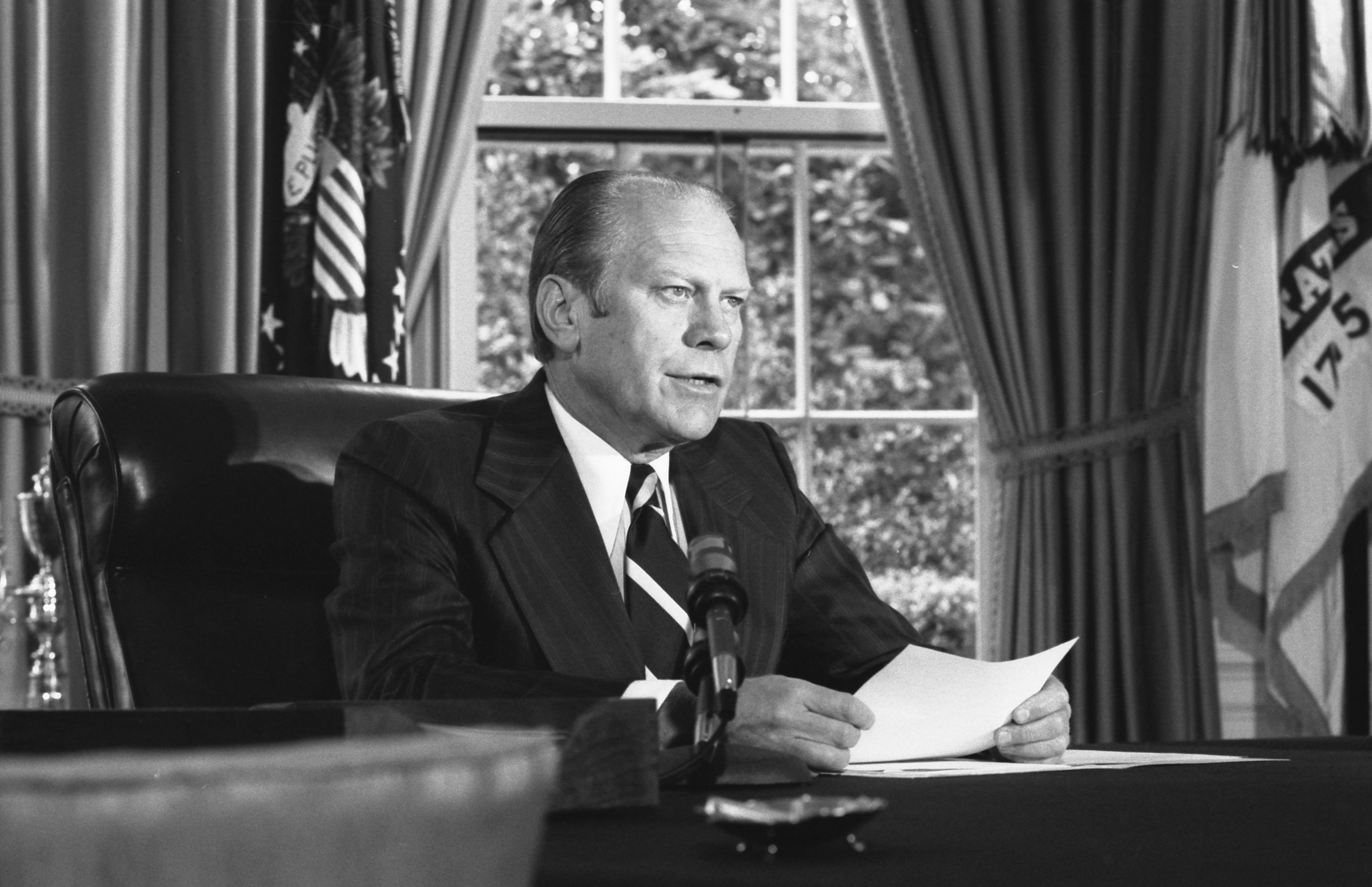
- President Gerald Ford announcing his decision to pardon former President Richard Nixon
- Type: Presidential proclamation
- President: Gerald Ford
- Signed: September 8, 1974

Summary
- Granted a full and unconditional pardon to former President Richard Nixon

Gerald Ford, the president of the United States, issued a presidential proclamation—Proclamation 4311—on September 8, 1974, granting a full and unconditional pardon to Richard Nixon, his predecessor, for any crimes that he might have committed against the United States as president. In particular, the pardon covered Nixon's actions during the Watergate scandal. In a televised broadcast to the nation, Ford, who had succeeded to the presidency upon Nixon's resignation, explained that he felt the pardon was in the best interests of the country and that the Nixon family's situation was "a tragedy in which we all have played a part. It could go on and on and on, or someone must write the end to it. I have concluded that only I can do that, and if I can, I must."

After Ford left the White House in 1977, he privately justified his pardon of Nixon by carrying in his wallet a portion of the text of Burdick v. United States, a 1915 U.S. Supreme Court case in which the dictum stated that a pardon carries an imputation of guilt and that its acceptance carries a confession of guilt.

== Pardon ==
Following the release of the "smoking gun" tape on August 5, 1974, Nixon's position had become untenable. In his 1979 autobiography, A Time to Heal, Ford wrote about a meeting he had with White House Chief of Staff Alexander Haig before Nixon's resignation. Haig was explaining what he and Nixon's staff thought were Nixon's only options. He could try to ride out the impeachment and fight against conviction in the Senate all the way, or he could resign. His options for resigning were to delay his resignation until further along in the impeachment process to try to settle for a censure vote in Congress, or to pardon himself and then resign. Haig told Ford that some of Nixon's staff suggested that Nixon could agree to resign in return for an agreement that Ford would pardon him. On this subject, Ford wrote:

Haig emphasized that these weren't his suggestions. He didn't identify the staff members, and he made it very clear that he wasn't recommending any one option over another. What he wanted to know was whether or not my overall assessment of the situation agreed with his....[emphasis in original] Next, he asked if I had any suggestions as to courses of action for the President. I didn't think it would be proper for me to make any recommendations at all, and I told him so.

In a Washington Post story published the night Ford died, journalist Bob Woodward said that Ford once told Woodward he decided to pardon Nixon for other reasons, primarily the friendship that Ford and Nixon shared.

Following Nixon's resignation on August 9, 1974, the Nixons flew to La Casa Pacifica, their home in San Clemente, California. According to his biographer, Jonathan Aitken, after his resignation, "Nixon was a soul in torment." Congress had funded Nixon's transition costs, including some salary expenses, but reduced the appropriation from $850,000 to $200,000. With some of his staff still with him, Nixon was at his desk by 7 a.m. with little to do. His former press secretary, Ron Ziegler, sat with him alone for hours each day.

Nixon's resignation had not put an end to the desire among many to see him punished. With his resignation, Congress dropped its impeachment proceedings against him, but criminal prosecution was still a possibility on both the federal and state levels.

The Ford White House considered a pardon of Nixon, but it would be unpopular in the country. Nixon, contacted by Ford emissaries, was initially reluctant to accept the pardon but then agreed to do so. Ford, however, insisted on a statement of contrition; Nixon felt he had not committed any crimes and should not have to issue such a document. Ford eventually agreed, and on September 8, 1974, he granted Nixon a "full, free, and absolute pardon" that ended any possibility of an indictment. Nixon then released a statement:

I was wrong in not acting more decisively and more forthrightly in dealing with Watergate, particularly when it reached the stage of judicial proceedings and grew from a political scandal into a national tragedy. No words can describe the depth of my regret and pain at the anguish my mistakes over Watergate have caused the nation and the presidency, a nation I so deeply love, and an institution I so greatly respect.

== Public response ==
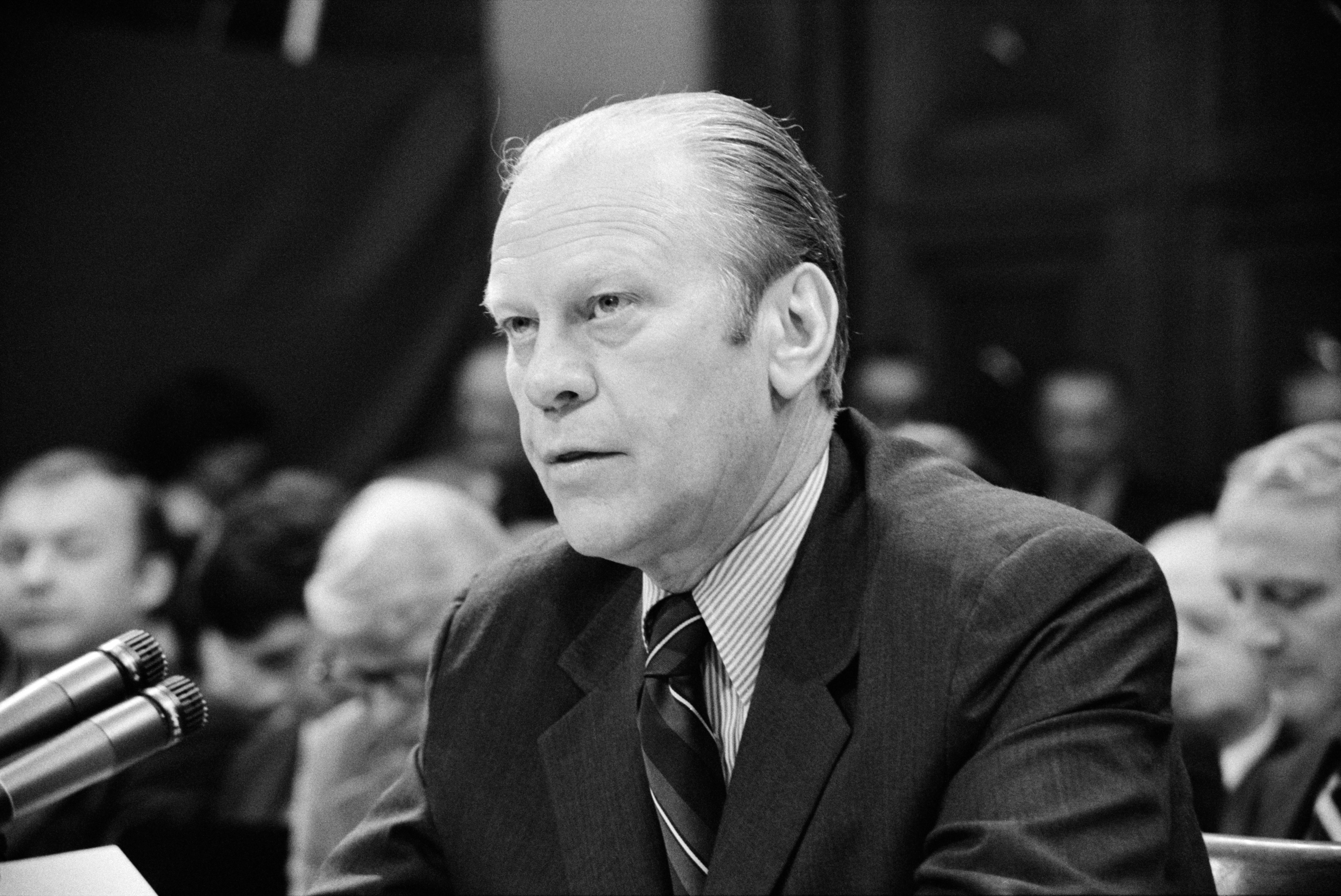
President Ford appears at a House Judiciary Subcommittee hearing regarding his pardon of Richard Nixon.

The Nixon pardon was controversial. Critics derided the move and claimed a "corrupt bargain" had been struck between the men: that Ford's pardon was granted in exchange for Nixon's resignation, elevating Ford to the presidency. Ford's first press secretary and close friend Jerald terHorst resigned his post in protest after the pardon.

The Nixon pardon was a pivotal moment in the Ford presidency. Historians believe that the controversy was one of the major reasons that Ford lost the election in 1976, and Ford agreed with that observation. In an editorial at the time, The New York Times stated that the Nixon pardon was a "profoundly unwise, divisive and unjust act" in which "President Ford [...] signally failed to provide courageous and impartial moral leadership." Allegations of a secret deal made with Ford, promising a pardon in return for Nixon's resignation, led Ford to testify before the House Judiciary Committee on October 17, 1974. He was the first sitting president to testify before the House of Representatives since Abraham Lincoln. Ford's approval rating dropped from 71% to 50% following the pardon.

== Aftermath ==
In October 1974, Nixon fell ill with phlebitis. Told by his doctors that he could either be operated on or die, a reluctant Nixon chose surgery, and Ford visited him in the hospital. Nixon was under subpoena for the trial of three of his former aides (John Dean, H. R. Haldeman, and John Ehrlichman). The pardon would have put Nixon in a difficult position on the witness stand since he would not have been able to assert any Fifth Amendment privilege when questioned about his actions as president. The Washington Post, disbelieving his illness, printed a cartoon showing Nixon with a cast on the "wrong foot". Judge John Sirica excused Nixon's presence despite the defendants' objections.

Congress instructed Ford to retain Nixon's presidential papers, which began a three-decade legal battle over the documents that was eventually lost by Nixon and his estate. Nixon was in the hospital when the 1974 midterm elections were held. Watergate and the pardon were contributing factors to the Republican loss of 43 seats in the House and four in the Senate. Two years later, lingering public resentment over the pardon was a factor in Ford's narrow loss to Democratic Party nominee Jimmy Carter in the 1976 presidential election.

After Ford left the White House in 1977, he privately justified his pardon of Nixon by carrying in his wallet a portion of the text of Burdick v. United States, a 1915 U.S. Supreme Court decision which states that a pardon carries an imputation of guilt and that acceptance carries a confession of guilt. In 2001, the John F. Kennedy Library Foundation awarded the John F. Kennedy Profile in Courage Award to Ford for his pardon of Nixon. In presenting the award to Ford, Senator Ted Kennedy said that he had initially been opposed to the pardon of Nixon, but later stated that history had proven Ford to have made the correct decision.

== See also ==
- Bibliography of Gerald Ford
- Eugenio Martínez, one of the Watergate burglars, and the only person aside from Nixon to receive a pardon for his role in the scandal
- Federal pardons in the United States
- List of people pardoned or granted clemency by the president of the United States

== Sources ==
- Aitken, Jonathan (1996). Nixon: A Life. Washington, D.C.: Regnery Publishing. ISBN 978-0-89526-720-7.
- Black, Conrad (2007). Richard M. Nixon: A Life in Full. New York: PublicAffairs Books. ISBN 978-1-58648-519-1.
- Ford, Gerald R. (1979). A Time to Heal: The Autobiography of Gerald R. Ford. San Francisco: Harper & Row. ISBN 0-06-011297-2. OCLC 4835213.
