= Coppage v. Kansas =

- Supreme Court of the United States

Submitted October 30, 1914 Decided January 25, 1915
- Full case name: Coppage v. State of Kansas
- Citations: 236 U.S. 1 (more) 35 S. Ct. 240; 59 L. Ed. 441; 1915 U.S. LEXIS 1798

Holding
- It is outside the scope of state police power to prohibit employment contracts that bar workers from joining a union.

Court membership
- Chief Justice Edward D. White Associate Justices Joseph McKenna · Oliver W. Holmes Jr. William R. Day · Charles E. Hughes; Willis Van Devanter · Joseph R. Lamar; Mahlon Pitney · James C. McReynolds

Case opinions
- Majority: Pitney, joined by White, McKenna, Van Devanter, Lamar, McReynolds
- Dissent: Holmes
- Dissent: Day, joined by Hughes
- Superseded by
- Lauf v. E. G. Shinner & Co. (1938)
- Abrogated by
- Norris-LaGuardia Act of 1932

Coppage v. Kansas, 236 U.S. 1 (1915), was a Supreme Court of the United States case based on United States labor law that allowed employers to implement contracts—called yellow-dog contracts—which forbade employees from joining unions.

The case was decided in the era prior to the Great Depression, when the Supreme Court invalidated laws that imposed restrictions on contracts, especially those of employment. The liberty of contract became viewed as a fundamental right that could be abridged only in extreme circumstances; abridgments violate the Due Process Clause of the Fourteenth Amendment.

== Background ==
Coppage, an employer, forbade his employees from joining labor unions by making it part of their contract, which the employee signed before being hired. That violated a Kansas law that prohibited such contracts.

== Decision ==
The majority opinion was written by Justice Pitney. It held that the law prohibiting such contracts violated Coppage's due process rights, as the government did not have a responsibility to prevent inequality of bargaining power:

[It] is said... To be a matter of common knowledge that 'employees, as a rule, are not financially able to be as independent in making contracts for the sale of their labor as are employers in making contracts of purchase thereof.' No doubt, wherever the right of private property exists, there must and will be inequalities of fortune. [Since] it is self-evident that... some persons must have more property than others, it is... impossible to uphold freedom of contract and the right of private property without at the same time recognizing as legitimate those inequalities of fortune that are the necessary result of the exercise of those rights.

He concluded that a state in the exercise of its police power did not have the right to redress imbalances of bargaining power and that requiring a man to give up the right to be in a union as a condition of employment does "not to ask him to give up any part of his constitutional freedom."

== Dissents ==
Justice Holmes wrote a dissent in which he called again for Lochner to be overruled and stated that the Constitution does not specifically prohibit a law like the one Kansas had and so it should be upheld:

I think the judgment should be affirmed. In present conditions, a workman not unnaturally may believe that only by belonging to a union can he secure a contract that shall be fair to him. Holden v. Hardy, 169 U. S. 366, 169 U. S. 397; Chicago, Burlington & Quincy R. Co. v. McGuire, 219 U. S. 549, 219 U. S. 570. If that belief, whether right or wrong, may be held by a reasonable man, it seems to me that it may be enforced by law in order to establish the equality of position between the parties in which liberty of contract begins. Whether in the long run it is wise for the workingmen to enact legislation of this sort is not my concern, but I am strongly of opinion that there is nothing in the Constitution of the United States to prevent it, and that Adair v. United States, 208 U. S. 161, and Lochner v. New York, 198 U. S. 45, should be overruled. I have stated my grounds in those cases, and think it unnecessary to add others that I think exist. See further Vegelahn v. Guntner, 167 Mass. 92, 104, 108; Plant v. Woods, 176 Mass. 492, 505. I still entertain the opinions expressed by me in Massachusetts.

Justice Day's dissent would have affirmed the liberty of contract against arbitrary legislative restraints but deferred more to the legislature on the question of whether the law upheld the public welfare. He also argued, "A man may not barter away his life or his freedom, or his substantial rights."

== See also ==
- US labor law
- List of United States Supreme Court cases, volume 236
