= List of United States Supreme Court cases, volume 236 =

Supreme Court of the United States
- Interactive map of Supreme Court of the United States
- 38°53′26″N 77°00′16″W
- Established: March 4, 1789; 236 years ago
- Location: Washington, D.C.
- Coordinates: 38°53′26″N 77°00′16″W
- Composition method: Presidential nomination with Senate confirmation
- Authorised by: Constitution of the United States, Art. III, § 1
- Judge term length: life tenure, subject to impeachment and removal
- Number of positions: 9 (by statute)
- Website: supremecourt.gov

This is a list of cases reported in volume 236 of United States Reports, decided by the Supreme Court of the United States in 1915.

== Justices of the Supreme Court at the time of volume 236 U.S. ==
The Supreme Court is established by Article III, Section 1 of the Constitution of the United States, which says: "The judicial Power of the United States, shall be vested in one supreme Court . . .". The size of the Court is not specified; the Constitution leaves it to Congress to set the number of justices. Under the Judiciary Act of 1789 Congress originally fixed the number of justices at six (one chief justice and five associate justices). Since 1789 Congress has varied the size of the Court from six to seven, nine, ten, and back to nine justices (always including one chief justice).

When the cases in volume 236 were decided the Court comprised the following nine members:

Portrait	Justice	Office	Home State	Succeeded	Date confirmed by the Senate (Vote)	Tenure on Supreme Court
	Edward Douglass White	Chief Justice	Louisiana	Melville Fuller	December 12, 1910 (Acclamation)	December 19, 1910 – May 19, 1921 (Died)
	Joseph McKenna	Associate Justice	California	Stephen Johnson Field	January 21, 1898 (Acclamation)	January 26, 1898 – January 5, 1925 (Retired)
	Oliver Wendell Holmes Jr.	Associate Justice	Massachusetts	Horace Gray	December 4, 1902 (Acclamation)	December 8, 1902 – January 12, 1932 (Retired)
	William R. Day	Associate Justice	Ohio	George Shiras Jr.	February 23, 1903 (Acclamation)	March 2, 1903 – November 13, 1922 (Retired)
	Charles Evans Hughes	Associate Justice	New York	David Josiah Brewer	May 2, 1910 (Acclamation)	October 10, 1910 – June 10, 1916 (Resigned)
	Willis Van Devanter	Associate Justice	Wyoming	Edward Douglass White (as Associate Justice)	December 15, 1910 (Acclamation)	January 3, 1911 – June 2, 1937 (Retired)
	Joseph Rucker Lamar	Associate Justice	Georgia	William Henry Moody	December 15, 1910 (Acclamation)	January 3, 1911 – January 2, 1916 (Died)
	Mahlon Pitney	Associate Justice	New Jersey	John Marshall Harlan	March 13, 1912 (50–26)	March 18, 1912 – December 31, 1922 (Resigned)
	James Clark McReynolds	Associate Justice	Tennessee	Horace Harmon Lurton	August 29, 1914 (44–6)	October 12, 1914 – January 31, 1941 (Retired)

== Notable Cases in 236 U.S. ==
=== Coppage v. Kansas ===
In Coppage v. Kansas, 236 U.S. 1 (1915), a case relating to United States labor law, the Supreme Court upheld a statute allowing employers to implement so-called "yellow-dog" contracts, which forbade employees from joining unions. The case was decided in an era when, under the legal abstraction of liberty of contract, the Court often invalidated laws restricting employment contracts, while ignoring the reality of disparate power that employers have over employees in imposing contractual terms.

=== Mutual Film Corp. v. Industrial Commission of Ohio ===
In Mutual Film Corp. v. Industrial Commission of Ohio, 236 U.S. 230 (1915), the Supreme Court held that free speech protections in the Ohio Constitution, which were substantially similar to those in the First Amendment of the United States Constitution, did not extend to motion pictures.

== Citation style ==
Under the Judiciary Act of 1789 the federal court structure at the time comprised District Courts, which had general trial jurisdiction; Circuit Courts, which had mixed trial and appellate (from the US District Courts) jurisdiction; and the United States Supreme Court, which had appellate jurisdiction over the federal District and Circuit courts—and for certain issues over state courts. The Supreme Court also had limited original jurisdiction (i.e., in which cases could be filed directly with the Supreme Court without first having been heard by a lower federal or state court). There were one or more federal District Courts and/or Circuit Courts in each state, territory, or other geographical region.

The Judiciary Act of 1891 created the United States Courts of Appeals and reassigned the jurisdiction of most routine appeals from the district and circuit courts to these appellate courts. The Act created nine new courts that were originally known as the "United States Circuit Courts of Appeals." The new courts had jurisdiction over most appeals of lower court decisions. The Supreme Court could review either legal issues that a court of appeals certified or decisions of court of appeals by writ of certiorari. On January 1, 1912, the effective date of the Judicial Code of 1911, the old Circuit Courts were abolished, with their remaining trial court jurisdiction transferred to the U.S. District Courts.

Bluebook citation style is used for case names, citations, and jurisdictions.

- "# Cir." = United States Court of Appeals
  - e.g., "3d Cir." = United States Court of Appeals for the Third Circuit
- "D." = United States District Court for the District of . . .
  - e.g.,"D. Mass." = United States District Court for the District of Massachusetts
- "E." = Eastern; "M." = Middle; "N." = Northern; "S." = Southern; "W." = Western
  - e.g.,"M.D. Ala." = United States District Court for the Middle District of Alabama
- "Ct. Cl." = United States Court of Claims
- The abbreviation of a state's name alone indicates the highest appellate court in that state's judiciary at the time.
  - e.g.,"Pa." = Supreme Court of Pennsylvania
  - e.g.,"Me." = Supreme Judicial Court of Maine

== List of cases in volume 236 U.S. ==
Case Name	Page & year	Opinion of the Court	Concurring opinion(s)	Dissenting opinion(s)	Lower Court	Disposition
Coppage v. Kansas	1 (1915)	Pitney	none	Holmes, Day	Kan.	reversed
Kinney v. Plymouth R.S. Co.	43 (1915)	White	none	none	multiple	in forma pauperis denied
Yost v. Dallas Cnty.	50 (1915)	Holmes	none	none	8th Cir.	certification
Reynolds v. Fewell	58 (1915)	Hughes	none	none	Okla.	affirmed
Shellenbarger v. Fewell	68 (1915)	Hughes	none	none	Okla.	affirmed
Lesser v. Gray	70 (1915)	McReynolds	none	none	Ga. Ct. App.	affirmed
Stearns v. Wood	75 (1915)	McReynolds	none	none	N.D. Ohio	dismissed
Burdick v. United States	79 (1915)	McKenna	none	none	S.D.N.Y.	reversed
Curtin v. United States	96 (1915)	McKenna	none	none	S.D.N.Y.	reversed
Duffy v. Charak	97 (1915)	Holmes	none	none	1st Cir.	reversed
City of Denver v. Home S. Bank	101 (1915)	Holmes	none	none	8th Cir.	affirmed
United States v. Jones	106 (1915)	VanDevanter	none	none	Ct. Cl.	affirmed
Simon v. Southern R.R. Co.	115 (1915)	Lamar	none	none	5th Cir.	affirmed
Grant et al. Co. v. Gray	133 (1915)	Holmes	none	none	La.	affirmed
Gallardo y S. v. Noble	135 (1915)	Holmes	none	none	D.P.R.	reversed
United States v. Holte	140 (1915)	Holmes	none	Lamar	E.D. Wis.	reversed
Wilmington T. Co. v. California R.R. Comm'n	151 (1915)	Hughes	none	none	Cal.	affirmed
Illinois C.R.R. Co. v. Fuentes	157 (1915)	McReynolds	none	none	E.D. La.	reversed
D.R. Wilder Mfg. Co. v. Corn P.R. Co.	165 (1915)	White	none	none	Ga. Ct. App.	affirmed
Heyman v. Hays	178 (1915)	White	none	none	Tenn.	reversed
Southern O. Co. v. Hays	188 (1915)	White	none	none	Tenn.	reversed
Washington et al. R.R. Co. v. Downey	190 (1915)	White	none	none	D.C. Cir.	dismissed
United States v. Terminal R.R. Ass'n	194 (1915)	White	none	none	E.D. Mo.	affirmed
Evens et al. Co. v. United States	210 (1915)	White	none	none	E.D. Mo.	affirmed
Olympia M. & M. Co. v. Kerns	211 (1915)	White	none	none	Idaho	dismissed
Brolan v. United States	216 (1915)	White	none	none	N.D. Cal.	dismissed
Truskett v. Closser	223 (1915)	McKenna	none	none	8th Cir.	affirmed
Mutual F. Co. v. Industrial Comm'n I	230 (1915)	McKenna	none	none	N.D. Ohio	affirmed
Mutual F. Co. v. Industrial Comm'n II	247 (1915)	McKenna	none	none	N.D. Ohio	affirmed
Mutual F. Corp. v. Hodges	248 (1915)	McKenna	none	none	D. Kan.	affirmed
United States v. Erie R.R. Co.	259 (1915)	McKenna	none	none	S.D.N.Y.	affirmed
Fox v. Washington	273 (1915)	Holmes	none	none	Wash.	affirmed
G.N. Pierce Co. v. Wells Fargo & Co.	278 (1915)	Day	none	none	2d Cir.	affirmed
Globe B. & T. Co. v. Martin	288 (1915)	Day	none	none	6th Cir.	affirmed
Iowa C.R.R. Co. v. Bacon	305 (1915)	Day	none	none	Iowa	affirmed
American et al. Co. v. Kettlehake	311 (1915)	Day	none	none	Mo. Ct. App.	affirmed
United States v. Louisville & N.R.R. Co.	318 (1915)	Day	none	none	W.D. Ky.	affirmed
Rail & R.C. Co. v. Yaple	338 (1915)	Day	none	none	N.D. Ohio	affirmed
Pennsylvania Co. v. United States	351 (1915)	Day	none	White	W.D. Pa.	affirmed
Miller v. Wilson	373 (1915)	Hughes	none	none	Cal.	affirmed
Bosley v. McLaughlin	385 (1915)	Hughes	none	none	N.D. Cal.	affirmed
Wright B. Co. v. United States	397 (1915)	Hughes	none	none	5th Cir.	affirmed
United States v. Smull	405 (1915)	Hughes	none	none	D. Or.	reversed
Meeker & Co. v. Lehigh V.R.R. Co.	412 (1915)	VanDevanter	none	none	3d Cir.	reversed
Southern R.R. Co. v. Indiana R.R. Comm'n	439 (1915)	Lamar	none	none	Ind.	reversed
Lehman S. & Co. v. S. Gumbel & Co.	448 (1915)	Lamar	none	none	La.	affirmed
Toledo et al. R.R. Co. v. Slavin	454 (1915)	Lamar	none	none	Ohio	reversed
United States v. Midwest O. Co.	459 (1915)	Lamar	none	Day	8th Cir.	reversed
United States v. United States F. & G. Co.	512 (1915)	Pitney	none	none	9th Cir.	reversed
Joplin M. Co. v. United States	531 (1915)	Pitney	none	none	8th Cir.	affirmed
Williams v. United States F. & G. Co.	549 (1915)	McReynolds	none	none	Ga. Ct. App.	reversed
Gleason v. Thaw	558 (1915)	McReynolds	none	none	2d Cir.	affirmed
McCoach v. Pratt	562 (1915)	VanDevanter	none	none	3d Cir.	affirmed
Kirmeyer v. Kansas	568 (1915)	McReynolds	none	none	Kan.	reversed
Linn & L.T. Co. v. United States	574 (1915)	Holmes	none	none	9th Cir.	affirmed
Ramapo W. Co. v. City of New York	579 (1915)	Holmes	none	none	S.D.N.Y.	affirmed
Northern P.R.R. Co. v. North Dakota ex rel. McCue	585 (1915)	Hughes	none	none	N.D.	reversed
Norfolk & W.R.R. Co. v. Conley	605 (1915)	Hughes	none	none	W. Va.	reversed
Michigan C.R.R. Co. v. Michigan R.R. Comm'n	615 (1915)	Pitney	none	none	Mich.	affirmed
Wilson C. Co. v. Del Pozo y M.	635 (1915)	McKenna	none	none	5th Cir.	reversed
McCormick v. Oklahoma City	657 (1915)	McKenna	none	none	8th Cir.	dismissed
American S.M. Co. v. Kentucky	660 (1915)	McKenna	none	none	Ky.	reversed
A.J. Phillips Co. v. Grand Trunk W.R.R. Co.	662 (1915)	Lamar	none	none	6th Cir.	affirmed
Seaboard et al. R.R. Co. v. Padgett	668 (1915)	White	none	none	S.C.	affirmed
Wright v. Central of Ga. R.R. Co.	674 (1915)	Holmes	none	none	N.D. Ga.	affirmed
Wright v. Louisville & N.R.R. Co.	687 (1915)	Holmes	none	none	5th Cir.	affirmed
Newman v. Lynchburg I. Corp.	692 (1915)	Holmes	none	none	D.C. Cir.	affirmed
Davis v. Virginia	697 (1915)	Holmes	none	none	Va.	reversed
Dalton A.M. Co. v. State C. Comm'n	699 (1915)	Holmes	none	none	E.D. Va.	affirmed
Great N.R.R. Co. v. Hower	702 (1915)	Day	none	none	Wash.	reversed
St. Louis S.R.R. Co. v. Spring R.S. Co.	718 (1915)	McReynolds	none	none	Mo. Ct. App.	affirmed
W.S. Tyler Co. v. Ludlow S.W. Co.	723 (1915)	McReynolds	none	none	S.D.N.Y.	affirmed
