= Peg Fenwick =

American screenwriter and playwright

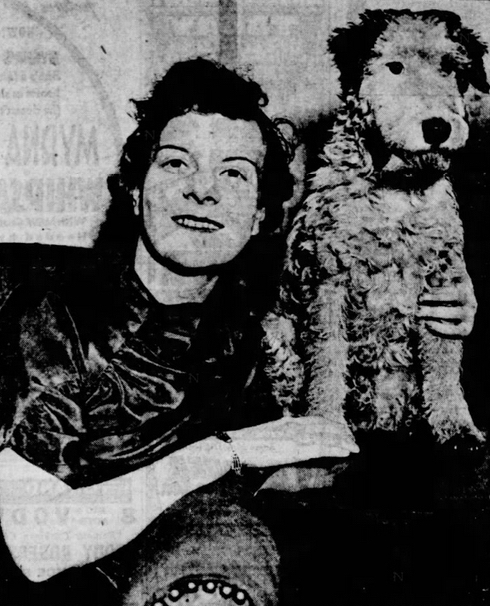
- Peggy Thompson with her dog Remus in 1936
- Born: Margaret Fenwick McCray; November 9, 1907; New York, New York, U.S.
- Died: November 5, 1987 (aged 79); Fulton, Missouri, U.S.
- Occupations: Screenwriter, playwright
- Spouse: Saul K. Padover (m. 1957)
- Writing career
- Pen name: Peggy Thompson, Peg Fenwick
- Notable works: Whirlpool of Desire, All That Heaven Allows

Margaret "Peg" McCray, also known as Peggy Thompson, Peggy or Peg Fenwick and Peg Padover (November 9, 1907 – November 5, 1987), was an American screenwriter and playwright who worked in the U.S. and French film industries, best known for writing the scripts for Whirlpool of Desire and All That Heaven Allows.

== Early life and education ==
McCray was born in New York City in 1907, daughter of Edward McCray, a lawyer, and his wife Anna Royce Carr. When McCray was six years old, her mother died, and her father died in 1914 when she was seven. McCray and her younger brother were adopted by Ellen Dustin Thompson and her husband William S. Thompson in 1917, and added the surname Thompson to their names. She grew up in St. Louis, Missouri, where she attended the Sacred Heart Convent School and the Mary Institute. She spent a year in France as a child, attending a school at St Germain, Paris, and also had a Belgian governess. She studied at the University of California at Los Angeles for a year, then left and worked as a secretary for Hollywood director Rowland Lee.

== Career ==
McCray worked at Paramount Pictures studio in New York, for four years. She did no original writing during that time, but did some continuity writing, and, fluent in French, she worked on the French adaptation of Honor Among Lovers (then known as Strictly Business). She moved to Paris, France, in about 1931. Using the name Peggy Thompson, she worked for the Vandor Company on the English version of Don Quixote (1933). She also wrote the story on which the film Remous (1935) was based. Her original title for it was A Kiss in the Dark, and she sold it for $5,000. A contemporary review also credits Peggy Thompson for "cutting" (ie editing) the film, along with E. T. Gréville and Curt Alexander. The film had made about $2,000,000 by the end of 1939, and McCray expressed regret that she had not sold it for a percentage of its earnings. During 1935, she worked in England with Basil Dean at Associated Talking Pictures, Ealing. There, she wrote the scenario for Midshipman Easy and assisted with the adaptation of Eleanor Smith's novel Ballerina for the screen (its film title was The Men in Her Life). She also wrote skits for Gracie Fields.

Remous was released in the US in 1939 as Whirlpool of Desire after American film censors had banned it over several years. By that time, McCray had worked on two films in the US, including King of the Newsboys (1938), and a French film about Alpine life and sports, which contained "no more sex". She reportedly found it embarrassing to see billboards proclaiming, "See Peggy Thompson's 'Whirlpool of Desire' - hotter even than Ecstasy."

In 1942, using the name Peggy Fenwick, she wrote a Christmas play called Among Those Present, which was performed at a church near Allentown, Pennsylvania. During World War II, she worked for the United States Office of War Information Bureau of Motion Pictures (BMP) as a script reviewer. Among the films she reviewed were In Old Oklahoma, A Song to Remember, Gung Ho!, Bataan, and So Proudly We Hail!.

In 1950, under the name Peg Fenwick, she wrote a stage play called Meet the World, which the Los Angeles Times described as "an impressive stage event", in which Fenwick showed "considerable understanding of present-day international problems ... in the parallel she drew with the founding of the United States." The play starred Jeff Chandler and celebrated accomplishments of UNESCO.

Fenwick then worked for Universal International Pictures. She adapted Ben Lucien Burman's novel Blow for a Landing. The film, retitled Mississippi Landing, was to star Audie Murphy, though the project was ultimately shelved. She also adapted the novel All That Heaven Allows by Edna Lee and Harry Lee into the screenplay for a film of the same name. The film starred Jane Wyman, Rock Hudson and Agnes Moorehead. The Evening Sun of Baltimore described Fenwick's script for All That Heaven Allows (1955) as "shrewdly and urbanely intelligent."

Fenwick wrote her final script in about 1958. During the 1960s, she worked for the U.S. State Department, advising on women's affairs in the Far East and Europe.

== Personal life ==
She married Saul K. Padover, a professor and author, in 1957. She was a member of the League of Women Voters, and also worked as an activist in Brooklyn Heights to improve sanitation in the area in the 1970s.

Her brother, Edward "Ted" McCray Thompson, was a reporter for the St. Louis Post-Dispatch, St. Louis Globe-Democrat, and St. Louis Star-Times and the author of a book called Leg Man. He died in 1957.

== Selected works ==
Screen:

- Midshipman Easy (1935)
- Remous (1935)
- King of the Newsboys (1938)
- All That Heaven Allows (1955)

Stage:

- Meet the World (1950)
- The Rebellious Franklins (1958)
