= Maryland State Board of Censors =

Defunct state agency

Agency overview
- Formed: 1916; 110 years ago
- Dissolved: 1981; 45 years ago
- Type: Censorship board
- Jurisdiction: Maryland

The Maryland State Board of Censors was a three-member agency in the U.S. state of Maryland from 1916 to 1981. No film could be officially released in the state without the approval of the board, which granted licenses to films it found "moral and proper".

The first agency decision to be appealed was the board's decision to ban the pacifist film War Brides (1916). The film had been approved in March 1917 for showing in state theaters, but shortly after the United States entered World War I, the film was banned in 1917 as it might affect military recruitment and for its pacifism. In 1918 a Baltimore City circuit court upheld the censorship board's decision. The court ruling was based on an Attorney General opinion that films calculated to obstruct or discourage recruitment were detrimental to the public morals.

Its powers were weakened after the Supreme Court case Freedman v. Maryland, 380 U.S. 51 (1965), which held that it could not outright ban a film's release through the refusal of a license, and had to secure a court order if it wanted to prevent a work from being shown. That case helped to end governmental movie censorship in the states that still had movie censorship boards--New York, Virginia, and Kansas. But the Maryland board lived on as the sole remaining statewide movie censorship board.

In 1970, the authority of the State Board of Censors was assigned to the newly created Maryland Department of Labor, Licensing and Regulation. In 1981, the board was abolished as a cost-cutting measure: the application fees for film licenses generated around $12,000 (equivalent to $42,496 in 2025) in annual revenue, which did not come close to offsetting the board's budget of nearly $100,000 (equivalent to $354,136 in 2025). A resolution to save the board from disbandment failed in the Maryland Senate, and Governor Harry Hughes had pledged to veto it if it had passed. It was the last surviving film censorship board in any U.S. state.

== Legacy ==
Vocal censor Mary Avara, and the overall history of the censor board, became the subject of the 2018 documentary Sickies Making Films, including reflections by Baltimore filmmaker John Waters.

== See also ==
- Film censorship in the United States
- Pennsylvania State Board of Censors
