= Whirlpool of Desire =

- Directed by: Edmond T. Gréville
- Written by: Peggy Thompson; André Doderet
- Produced by: Edmond T. Gréville; Gus Ostwalt
- Starring: Jeanne Boitel; Jean Galland; Maurice Maillot; Françoise Rosay
- Cinematography: Roger Hubert
- Edited by: Edmond T. Gréville
- Music by: Georges Boulanger
- Production company: H. O. Films
- Distributed by: Pathé Consortium Cinéma (France); Arthur Mayer & Joseph Burstyn (US)
- Release dates: 15 March 1935 (France); 28 November 1939 (US)
- Running time: 85 minutes
- Country: France
- Language: French

Whirlpool of Desire (French: Remous) is a 1935 French drama film directed by Edmond T. Gréville and starring Jeanne Boitel, Jean Galland, Maurice Maillot, and Françoise Rosay. The screenplay was written by American writer Peggy Thompson and André Doderet. It was shot at the Saint-Maurice Studios in Paris. The film's sets were designed by art director Pierre Schild.

== Synopsis ==
A newlywed couple suffer tragedy when the husband is seriously injured in a car accident.

== Cast ==
- Jeanne Boitel as Jeanne Saint-Clair - the Wife
- Jean Galland as Henry Saint-Clair - the Husband
- Maurice Maillot as Robert Vanier, the Lover
- Diana Sari as Paulette, Madame Gardane's daughter
- Lyne Clevers as Mademoiselle Lydia
- Jean Kolb as The Doctor
- Robert Arnoux as Pierre
- Françoise Rosay as Madame Gardane

== Censorship ==
In November 1939, the film was released in the U.S. by Arthur Mayer and Joseph Burstyn after a long court battle over American film censorship. Burstyn was later involved in the Miracle Decision (1952) overturning film censorship in the U.S.

From IMDb: Albany, New York – Monday, January 23, 1939: "The French film Remous was shown Friday [January 20] to five judges of the New York State Appellate Division in proceedings in the attempt by Arthur Mayer and Joseph Burstyn to get a license to screen it in New York State. The picture has twice been denied a license, first in August 1936, when it was rejected as being "indecent", "immoral", and tending to "corrupt morals". It was again rejected in November 1937. In March 1938, it was screened for the New York Board of Regents who, on April 14, disapproved application for a license. Arthur Garfield Hays, counsel for Mayer and Burstyn at yesterday's proceedings, ridiculed the objections of Irwin Esmond and the Regents to certain scenes, pointing out that the film was French and would appeal only to an educated audience. Counsel for the Regents based his plea on the film's theme of sex-frustration, arguing that it would be unwise public policy to show it to all classes of people."

In November 1939, Mayer and Burstyn released the film in the U.S. as Whirlpool of Desire. Film censorship in the United States was not overturned until the U.S. Supreme Court case, Joseph Burstyn, Inc. v. Wilson (the "Miracle Decision") in 1952.

== See also ==
- Film censorship in the United States
- Arthur Mayer
- Joseph Burstyn
- Miracle Decision (1952)
- Mutual Film Corporation v. Industrial Commission of Ohio (1915)

== Bibliography ==
- Dudley Andrew. Mists of Regret: Culture and Sensibility in Classic French Film. Princeton University Press, 1995.
