= Pennsylvania State Board of Censors =

Defunct regulatory agency in Pennsylvania

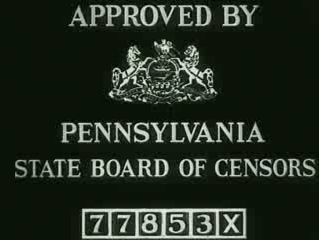
- This screen was inserted into all films to be shown in Pennsylvania, each with a specific number. This one belonged to Thru Traffic (1935) and was shown as the last frame of the film.

Agency overview
- Formed: 1911; 115 years ago
- Dissolved: 1961; 65 years ago
- Type: Censorship board
- Jurisdiction: Pennsylvania

The Pennsylvania State Board of Censors was an organization under the Pennsylvania Department of Education responsible for approving, redacting, or banning motion pictures that it considered "sacrilegious, obscene, indecent, or immoral" or might pervert morals.

== Organization ==
The board was composed of three members, who were appointed by the Governor of Pennsylvania. Despite a censorship law passed in 1911, a lack of funding prevented it from beginning its activities until 1914.

== Elimination ==
In 1956, the Supreme Court of Pennsylvania ruled the act which created and provided for the board was unconstitutional, with respect to the Pennsylvania Constitution and so revoked the mandate for the board's existence. The Pennsylvania General Assembly re-enacted the statute in 1959, but it was struck down again in 1961 by the Pennsylvania Supreme Court.

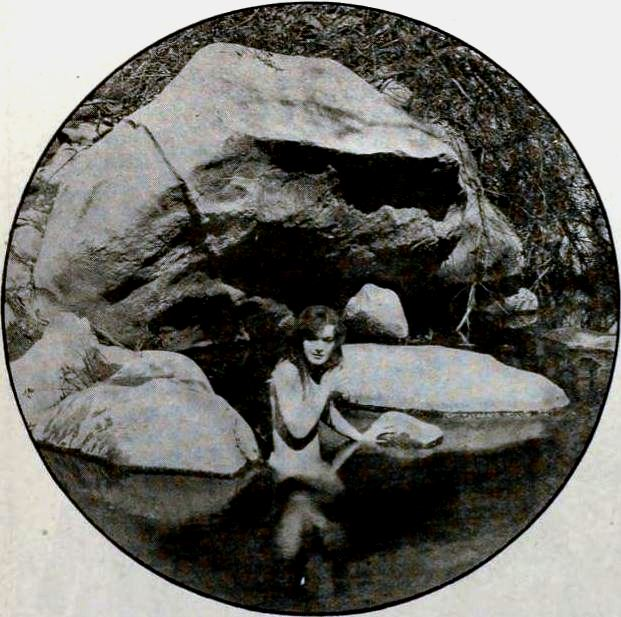
This scene from The Branding Iron (1920) was cut by the Pennsylvania board, which then banned the film for its topic of infidelity.

== See also ==
- British Board of Film Censors
- Film censorship in the United States
- Indian Film Censor Board
- List of Pennsylvania state agencies
- Maryland State Board of Censors
