= Mutual Film Corp. v. Industrial Commission of Ohio =

Mutual Film Corporation v. Industrial Commission of Ohio
- Supreme Court of the United States

Argued January 6–7, 1915 Decided February 23, 1915
- Full case name: Mutual Film Corporation, Appellant v. Industrial Commission of Ohio, et al.
- Citations: 236 U.S. 230 (more) 35 S. Ct. 387; 59 L. Ed. 552; 1915 U.S. LEXIS 1755

Holding
- The free speech protection of the Ohio Constitution did not extend to motion pictures.

Court membership
- Chief Justice Edward D. White Associate Justices Joseph McKenna · Oliver W. Holmes Jr. William R. Day · Charles E. Hughes; Willis Van Devanter · Joseph R. Lamar; Mahlon Pitney · James C. McReynolds

Case opinion
- Majority: McKenna, joined by unanimous
- Overruled by
- Joseph Burstyn, Inc. v. Wilson (1952)

Mutual Film Corporation v. Industrial Commission of Ohio, 236 U.S. 230 (1915), was a landmark decision of the US Supreme Court ruling by a 9–0 vote that the free speech protection of the Ohio Constitution, which was substantially similar to the First Amendment of the United States Constitution, did not extend to motion pictures.

== Background ==
The state government of Ohio had passed a statute in 1913 forming a board of censors which had the duty of reviewing and approving all films intended to be exhibited in the state. Like other state and municipal governments, Ohio charged a licensing fee to distributors. The board could order the arrest of anyone showing an unapproved film in the state.

The plaintiff, Mutual Film Corporation, was a movie distributor and sought an injunction against the Board. Mutual argued that in addition to the violation of its freedom of speech, the censorship board was interfering with interstate commerce in violation of the Dormant Commerce Clause and that the government had illegally delegated legislative authority to a censor board. Those arguments were dismissed by the Court perfunctorily.

== Decision ==
Justice McKenna, writing for the Court stated:

... the exhibition of moving pictures is a business, pure and simple, originated and conducted for profit ... not to be regarded, nor intended to be regarded by the Ohio Constitution, we think, as part of the press of the country, or as organs of public opinion.

The Court described movies in some technical detail and noted their popularity but wrote that as "they may be used for evil, ... We cannot regard [the censorship of movies] as beyond the power of government." The Court added that it would be equally unreasonable to grant free speech protection to the theater or the circus and noted that in many prior cases regarding government licensure of theatrical performances, the issue of freedom of opinion had not been raised.

== Aftermath ==
The decision that motion pictures did not merit First Amendment protection drove an increase in regulation of film content, which culminated in the enforcement in July 1934 of the Production Code over all Hollywood films. The Production Code, also known as the Hays Code, was not law but an agreement between studios and theaters to self-censor, partly to avoid the patchwork of local censorship laws that existed around the country. In May 1952, the Supreme Court overturned its Mutual decision in Joseph Burstyn, Inc v. Wilson, popularly known as the "Miracle Decision" since it referred to the short film The Miracle, part of the anthology film L'Amore (1948), directed by Roberto Rossellini.

The Production Code was loosened in the 1950s and 1960s and was eventually abandoned, in favor of the MPAA film rating system in 1968.

== See also ==
- Film censorship in the United States
- List of United States Supreme Court cases, volume 236
- List of United States Supreme Court cases involving the First Amendment
- Whirlpool of Desire (1935) French film distributed by Arthur Mayer and Joseph Burstyn
