= King of the Newsboys =

1938 film by Bernard Vorhaus

- Directed by: Bernard Vorhaus
- Written by: Louis Weitzenkorn (screenplay); Peggy Thompson (screenplay); Samuel Ornitz (story); Horace McCoy (story)
- Produced by: Bernard Vorhaus (producer)
- Starring: See below
- Cinematography: Jack A. Marta
- Edited by: Ernest J. Nims
- Music by: Alberto Colombo
- Distributed by: Republic Pictures
- Release date: March 18, 1938
- Running time: 65 minutes 69 minutes (DVD version)
- Country: United States
- Language: English

King of the Newsboys is a 1938 American drama film directed by Bernard Vorhaus.

== Plot ==
Jerry Flynn's girlfriend leaves him for a gangster with power and money, in order to show her that she made a mistake, Jerry starts his newspaper distribution business.

== Cast ==
- Lew Ayres as Jerry Flynn
- Helen Mack as Mary Ellen Stephens
- Alison Skipworth as Nora
- Victor Varconi as Wire Arno
- Sheila Bromley as Connie Madison
- Alice White as Dolly
- Horace McMahon as Lockjaw
- William 'Billy' Benedict as Squimpy
- Ray Cooke as Pussy
- Jack Pennick as Lefty
- Mary Kornman as Peggy
- Gloria Rich as Maizie
- Oscar O'Shea as Mr. Stephens
