= All That Heaven Allows =

1955 film by Douglas Sirk

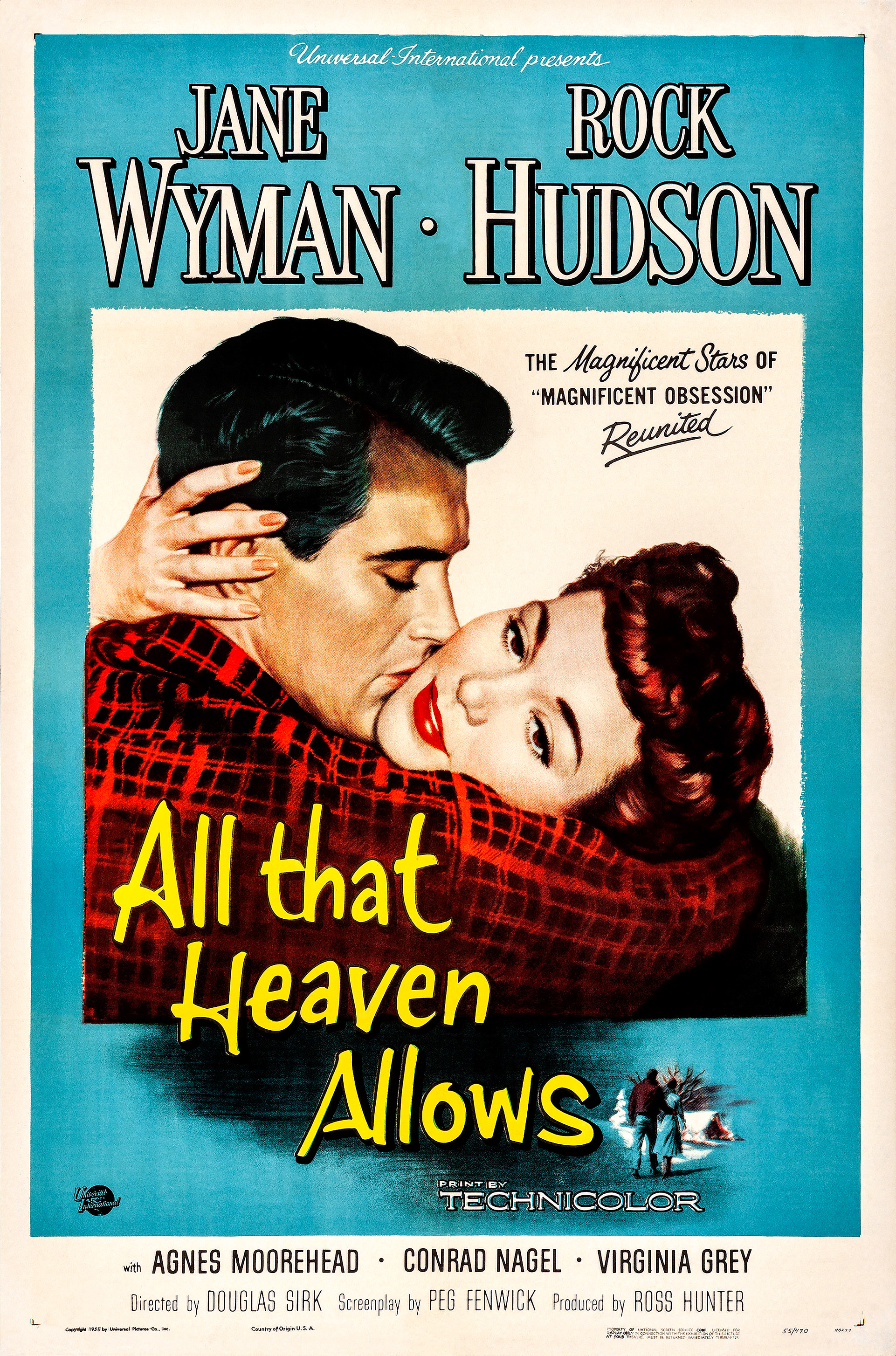
- Theatrical release poster by Reynold Brown
- Directed by: Douglas Sirk
- Screenplay by: Peg Fenwick
- Story by: Edna L. Lee; Harry Lee
- Produced by: Ross Hunter
- Starring: Jane Wyman; Rock Hudson; Agnes Moorehead; Conrad Nagel; Virginia Grey
- Cinematography: Russell Metty
- Edited by: Frank Gross
- Music by: Frank Skinner
- Production company: Universal-International
- Distributed by: Universal Pictures
- Release dates: August 25, 1955 (United Kingdom); December 25, 1955 (United States)
- Running time: 89 minutes
- Country: United States
- Language: English
- Box office: $3.1 million (US and Canada rentals)

All That Heaven Allows is a 1955 American melodrama film directed by Douglas Sirk, produced by Ross Hunter, and adapted by Peg Fenwick from a story by Edna L. Lee and Harry Lee. It stars Jane Wyman and Rock Hudson in a tale about the social complications that arise following the development of a romance between a well-to-do widow and a younger poorer man. In 1995, the film was selected for preservation in the United States' National Film Registry.

== Plot ==
Original release trailer for All That Heaven Allows

Cary Scott is an affluent widow in the town of Stoningham, in suburban New England, whose social life revolves around the weekend visits of her college-age son and daughter, her best friend's country-club activities, and a few men vying for her affection. Feeling stuck in a rut, she becomes interested in Ron Kirby, her arborist. He is an intelligent, down-to-earth, and respectful, yet passionate, younger man, and she discovers he is content with his simple life outside the materialistic society in which they live. Ron introduces Cary to his friends, Alida and Mick Anderson, who seem to have no need for wealth or status, and their exuberance provides a welcome contrast to her staid existence.

Ron and Cary fall in love, and Ron proposes. Cary accepts, but she has concerns about the viability of their relationship, due to their different ages, classes, and lifestyles. These concerns are magnified when she tells her children and friends about the engagement and is met with a solid wall of disapproval, and, eventually, she breaks up with Ron. Particularly influential in her change of mind are her children's protestations against Cary's plan to sell the family home and move to Ron's tree nursery, as they will not want to visit her there.

After spending most of the Christmas season alone, Cary misses her life with Ron, but she thinks she has missed her opportunity for happiness because she mistakenly believes Ron is seeing another woman. On Christmas, her daughter announces she will be getting married soon and her son says that, since he is likely going to study abroad and then work overseas, they should start thinking about selling their house, which is too big for just Cary. She is overwhelmed by how pointless her sacrifice was, and her spirits are not lifted when her children give her a television set to fill her empty life.

Cary goes to see a doctor about recurrent headaches she has started having, and he suggests they are being caused by her body punishing her for ending her relationship with Ron. Leaving the appointment, she runs into Alida, and in the course of their conversation, she learns that Ron is still single. She goes to his property, but then changes her mind and leaves. Ron sees her from a precipice and excitedly, though unsuccessfully, tries to get her attention. The ground collapses out from under him, and he falls off the cliff.

That night, Alida tells Cary about the accident, and she hurries over to his house. She decides she no longer wants to allow other people to dictate how she lives her life and settles in to nurse Ron back to health. When Ron regains consciousness, Cary tells him that she has come home.

== Cast ==
- Jane Wyman as Cary Scott
- Rock Hudson as Ron Kirby
- Agnes Moorehead as Sara Warren
- Conrad Nagel as Harvey
- Virginia Grey as Alida Anderson
- Gloria Talbott as Kay Scott
- William Reynolds as Ned Scott
- Charles Drake as Mick Anderson
- Hayden Rorke as Dr. Dan Hennessy
- Jacqueline de Wit as Mona Plash
- Leigh Snowden as Jo-Ann Grisby
- Donald Curtis as Howard Hoffer
- Alex Gerry as George Warren
- Nestor Paiva as Manuel
- Forrest Lewis as Mr. Weeks
- Tol Avery as Tom Allenby
- Merry Anders as Mary Ann
- David Janssen as Freddie Norton, Kay's boyfriend (uncredited)
- Gia Scala as Marguerita, Manuel's daughter (uncredited)

== Production ==
=== Screenplay ===
Screenwriter Peg Fenwick wrote the screenplay for All That Heaven Allows based on the 394-page novel of the same name by Edna L. Lee and Harry Lee. Notations made on various pages of a copy of the original screenplay owned by the New York Public Library indicate that the script was written in August 1954.

Some scenes in the script differ from those in the finished film. For instance, in the screenplay Rock Hudson's character, Ron Kirby, lies on the grass eating his lunch, but in the final cut of the film, he has lunch with Jane Wyman's character, Cary Scott.

Sirk considered having Hudson's character die at the end of the film, but Ross Hunter, the film's producer, would not allow it, because he wanted a more positive ending.

=== Development ===
After the success of Magnificent Obsession in 1954, Universal-International Pictures wanted Sirk to make another film starring Wyman and Hudson. He found the screenplay for All That Heaven Allows "rather impossible", but was able to restructure it and use the big budget to film and edit the work exactly the way he wanted.

Wyman was 38 when she played the film's "older woman", who scandalizes society and her grown-up children by becoming engaged to a younger man. Hudson, "the younger man", was 29 at the time.

=== Filming ===
Some exteriors for the film were shot on "Colonial Street", a studio backlot built by Paramount Pictures on the property of Universal Studios four years earlier and used in the film The Desperate Hours. The set was re-designed to mimic an upper-middle class New England town. The film contains only one visible crane shot, when the camera scans over the fictional town of Stoningham during the opening credits. Tracking and dollying shots were used frequently for interior shots. The set was later featured on the television series Leave It to Beaver.

=== Music ===
The music that recurs throughout the film is Consolation No. 3 in D-flat major by Franz Liszt, along with frequent snatches of the finale to Brahms's First Symphony, the latter re-scored and sometimes elaborated. Also heard intermittently is "Warum?" (German for "Why?") by Robert Schumann, from the Fantasiestücke, Op. 12.

== Release ==
The film was released in Great Britain on August 25, 1955, several months ahead of its US premiere. In the United States, it opened in Los Angeles on Christmas Day 1955, and in New York City on February 28, 1956. The US release followed an extensive advertising campaign focusing on popular women's magazines such as McCall's, Family Circle, Woman's Day, and Redbook, which referred to the film as a "woman's picture".

Motion Picture Daily reported that the film earned $16,000 on its opening day and did “above average” business in areas like Atlanta, Miami, New Orleans, and Jacksonville.

== Reception ==
The film press compared the movie favorably to Magnificent Obsession (1954), which also starred Wyman and Hudson and was directed by Sirk. A review in Motion Picture Daily was generally positive and praised Sirk for his use of color and mise en scène, saying: "In a print by Technicolor, the exterior shots and the interior settings are so beautifully photographed that they point up the action of the story with telling effect."

Although Sirk's reputation waned in the 1960s—as he was dismissed as a director of dated and insubstantial Hollywood melodramas—it was revived in the 1970s due to the praise of New German Cinema directors like Rainer Werner Fassbinder and the publication of Jon Halliday's Sirk on Sirk (1971), in which the filmmaker describes his aesthetic and (often-subversive) social perspective. His reputation, and that of All That Heaven Allows, has grown since then, with critic Richard Brody describing him as a master of both melodrama and comedy, and the film as remarkable for its use of Henry David Thoreau's Walden as a homegrown American philosophy depicted as a "vital and ongoing experience."

On the review aggregator website Rotten Tomatoes, All That Heaven Allows holds an approval rating of 91% based on 32 reviews, with an average rating of 8.1/10. The website's critics consensus reads, "Big heart, big drama, and even bigger colors, All That Heaven Allows is tip top Douglas Sirk."

== Awards and honors ==
In 1995, the film was deemed "culturally, historically, or aesthetically significant" by the Library of Congress, and was selected for preservation in the National Film Registry. In 2022, the film received 21 votes for Sight and Sounds poll of the greatest films of all time, tied with several other classics, such as The Wild Bunch, Trouble in Paradise and The Seventh Seal.

== References in other films ==
All That Heaven Allows inspired Rainer Werner Fassbinder's Ali: Fear Eats the Soul (1974), in which a mature woman falls in love with an Arab man. It was spoofed by John Waters with his film Polyester (1981). Todd Haynes' Far from Heaven (2002) is an homage to Sirk's work, in particular All That Heaven Allows and Imitation of Life (1959). François Ozon's 8 Women (2002) features winter scenes and deer reminiscent of this film.

== See also ==
- List of American films of 1955
