= Joseph Burstyn, Inc. v. Wilson =

- Supreme Court of the United States

Argued April 24, 1952 Decided May 26, 1952
- Full case name: Joseph Burstyn, Incorporated v. Wilson, Commissioner of Education of New York, et al.
- Citations: 343 U.S. 495 (more) 72 S. Ct. 777; 96 L. Ed. 1098; 1952 U.S. LEXIS 2796; 1 Media L. Rep. 1357

Case history
- Prior: 278 A.D. 253, 104 N.Y.S.2d 740 (App. Div. 1951), affirmed, 303 N.Y. 242, 101 N.E.2d 665 (1951).

Holding
- Provisions of the New York Education Law that allow a censor to forbid the commercial showing of any non-licensed motion picture film, or revoke or deny the license of a film deemed to be "sacrilegious", were a "restraint on freedom of speech", and thereby a violation of the 1st Amendment.

Court membership
- Chief Justice Fred M. Vinson Associate Justices Hugo Black · Stanley F. Reed; Felix Frankfurter · William O. Douglas; Robert H. Jackson · Harold H. Burton; Tom C. Clark · Sherman Minton

Case opinions
- Majority: Clark, joined by Vinson, Black, Douglas, Burton, Minton
- Concurrence: Reed (in judgment)
- Concurrence: Frankfurter (in judgment), joined by Jackson, Burton

Laws applied
- U.S. Const. amends. I, XIV
- This case overturned a previous ruling or rulings
- Mutual Film Corporation v. Industrial Commission of Ohio (1915)

Joseph Burstyn, Inc. v. Wilson, 343 U.S. 495 (1952), also referred to as the Miracle Decision, is a landmark decision by the United States Supreme Court that largely marked the decline of motion picture censorship in the United States. It determined that provisions of the New York Education Law that had allowed a censor to forbid the commercial showing of a motion picture film that the censor deemed "sacrilegious" were a "restraint on freedom of speech" and thereby a violation of the First Amendment.

In recognizing that film was an artistic medium entitled to protection under the First Amendment, the Court overturned its previous decision in Mutual Film Corporation v. Industrial Commission of Ohio, which found that movies were not a form of speech worthy of First Amendment protection, but merely a business.

== Background ==
The case was an appeal to the Supreme Court by film distributor Joseph Burstyn after the state of New York rescinded the license to exhibit the short film "The Miracle," originally made as a segment of the Italian film L'Amore. Burstyn was the distributor of the subtitled English versions of the film in the U.S.

The film was directed by Italian neorealist Roberto Rossellini. Its plot centered on a man, "Saint Joseph" (played by director Federico Fellini), who villainously impregnates "Nanni" (Anna Magnani), a disturbed peasant who believes herself to be the Virgin Mary. Fellini and Rossellini also co-wrote the script for "The Miracle."

"The Miracle" originally premiered in Europe in 1948 as the anthology film L'Amore with two segments, "Il Miracolo" and "La voce umana," the latter based on Jean Cocteau's play The Human Voice and also starring Magnani. The film was first shown in New York in November 1950, presented under the title Ways of Love, with English subtitles. In December, Ways of Love was voted the best foreign language film of 1950 by the New York Film Critics Circle.

"The Miracle" in particular sparked widespread moral outrage, and was criticized as "vile, harmful, and blasphemous." Protesters at the Paris Theater, where the film was screened, picketed the film with vitriolic signs carrying messages like "This Picture Is an Insult to Every Decent Woman and Her Mother," "Don't Be a Communist," and "Don't Enter the Cesspool."

After its American release, the New York State Board of Regents reportedly received "hundreds of letters, telegrams, postcards, affidavits and other communications" both protesting and defending the exhibition of the film. Three members of the board were subsequently ordered to examine it, and they concluded that "The Miracle" was "sacrilegious" and directed the appellants to show otherwise at a hearing. The hearing determined that the film indeed constituted religious bigotry and on February 16, 1951, the Commissioner of Education was ordered to rescind the picture's license.

The appellant brought the Board of Regents' decision to the New York courts for review, on the grounds that the statute "violates the First Amendment as a prior restraint upon freedom of speech and of the press," "that it is invalid under the same Amendment as a violation of the guaranty of separate church and state and as a prohibition of the free exercise of religion" and "that the term 'sacrilegious' is so vague and indefinite as to offend due process." The decision was upheld by the state courts, including the New York Court of Appeals. The decision was then appealed to the U.S. Supreme Court.

The Supreme Court decision in 1952 brought films under the free speech and free press provisions of the First Amendment, overturning the Mutual case that had stood as precedent to censor films since 1915. It is true that, because the decision said that films could still be censored under a narrowly drawn statute for obscenity, states and municipalities continued censoring, many until the mid-1960s and Maryland until 1981. However, the Burstyn case was the turning point, as it became the precedent used in many other challenge cases.

== Relevant statute provisions ==
The part of the statute (N. Y. Education Law, §122) in question that forbade the exhibition of unlicensed films read:

[It is unlawful] to exhibit, or to sell, lease or lend for exhibition at any place of amusement for pay or in connection with any business in the state of New York, any motion picture film or reel [with specified exceptions not relevant here], unless there is at the time in full force and effect a valid license or permit therefor of the education department ...

The paragraph allowing the repeal of "sacrilegious" films' license read:

The director of the [motion picture] division [of the education department] or, when authorized by the regents, the officers of a local office or bureau shall cause to be promptly examined every motion picture film submitted to them as herein required, and unless such film or a part thereof is obscene, indecent, immoral, inhuman, sacrilegious, or is of such a character that its exhibition would tend to corrupt morals or incite to crime, shall issue a license therefor. If such director or, when so authorized, such officer shall not license any film submitted, he shall furnish to the applicant therefor a written report of the reasons for his refusal and a description of each rejected part of a film not rejected in toto.

== See also ==
- List of United States Supreme Court cases, volume 343
- Freedman v. Maryland (1965 U. S. Supreme Court case)
- Whirlpool of Desire (1935), a French film that was also distributed by Burstyn and Arthur Mayer
