= 1982 Academy Awards =

1982 Academy Awards may refer to:

- 54th Academy Awards, the Academy Awards ceremony that took place in 1982
- 55th Academy Awards, the 1983 ceremony honoring the best in film for 1982
