= United States v. Wilson =

1833 United States Supreme Court case

- Supreme Court of the United States

Argued January 18, 1833 Decided January 26, 1833
- Full case name: United States v. George Wilson
- Citations: 32 U.S. 150 (more) 7 Pet. 150; 8 L. Ed. 640; 1833 U.S. LEXIS 340

Holding
- A pardon cannot be recognized by a judge if it has not been brought judicially before the court by plea, motion, or otherwise.

Court membership
- Chief Justice John Marshall Associate Justices William Johnson · Gabriel Duvall; Joseph Story · Smith Thompson; John McLean · Henry Baldwin

Case opinion
- Majority: Marshall, joined by unanimous

United States v. Wilson, 32 U.S. (7 Pet.) 150 (1833), was a case in the United States in which the defendant, George Wilson, was convicted of robbing the US Mail, and putting the life of the carrier in danger, in Pennsylvania and sentenced to death. Due to his friends' influence, Wilson was pardoned by Andrew Jackson.

The pardon included the following condition:

... with this express stipulation, that this pardon shall not extend to any judgment which may be had or obtained against him, in any other case or cases now pending before said court for other offences wherewith he may stand charged.

Wilson, however, refused the pardon. The Supreme Court was thus asked to rule on the case.

The decision was that if the prisoner does not accept the pardon, it is not in effect: "A pardon is a deed, to the validity of which delivery is essential, and delivery is not complete without acceptance. It may then be rejected by the person to whom it is tendered; and if it be rejected, we have discovered no power in this court to force it upon him."

Wilson's fate after the case is difficult to resolve, with sources providing seemingly contradictory accounts. While Wilson refused the pardon, a report in the National Gazette of Philadelphia dated January 14, 1841, suggests that he avoided being hanged—unlike his accomplice—and was in prison for ten years until released. The Gazette further indicates that Wilson received another pardon from President Martin Van Buren, which he accepted. However, Smithsonian magazine has written that Wilson was hanged as a result of refusing the pardon.
