= List of 81st Academy Awards In Memoriam tribute honorees =

Each year, an In Memoriam tribute, which honors distinguished members of the Academy of Motion Picture Arts and Sciences who died during the previous year, is included during the televised presentation of the Academy Awards. Listed below are those who were honored on February 22, 2009, at the Kodak Theatre in Los Angeles, California, during the 81st Academy Awards tribute.

Paul Newman, who appeared last, is considered to be the featured tribute. At the conclusion of the musical accompaniment, a short dialogue by Paul Newman ended the tribute. The Newman dialogue concluded the tribute with the following quote: "The big difference between people is not between the rich and the poor, the good and the evil. The biggest of all differences between people is between those who have had pleasure in love and those who haven't." —Paul Newman as Chance Wayne in Sweet Bird of Youth.

== Controversies ==
During the 81st Academy Awards, which was hosted by the Academy of Motion Picture Arts and Sciences, Queen Latifah was the presenter and a performer for the annual In Memoriam tribute. This was controversial because traditionally the segment is accompanied by instrumental music and displayed without vocal music accompaniment. Live music has previously accompanied the tribute however; and cellist Yo-Yo Ma did so during the 77th Academy Awards - although his performance was solely instrumental. Latifah sang "I'll Be Seeing You" from the Broadway musical Right This Way during the 81st Academy Awards tribute to honor individuals who had died since the previous year's Academy Award ceremonies. The controversy of the performance was compounded by the visual display from a camera panning around the stage at a distance, leaving television viewers unable to see and read a number of different names/pictures on the large screen at the back of the stage.

There were plans to attempt to dampen the audience applause during the tribute that included cutting the audio feed from the theatre. This effort was intended to disguise audience preferences for certain deceased honorees over others. Some industry insiders speculate that Latifah's performance was a successful effort to minimize audience applause during the tribute.

The tribute had a second break from tradition. Ten years ago when Gene Siskel was omitted from the tribute because as a film critic he was not a member of the academy, host Whoopi Goldberg ad libbed his tribute, which concluded with her giving a thumbs-up at the ceiling (i.e., heaven). The 81st Academy Awards' tribute included film critic Manny Farber. However, the tribute did not go so far as to include the recently deceased movie trailer voice acting specialist Don LaFontaine.

== 2009 Ceremony Honoree list ==
Name	Career	Birth	Death	Academy Awards recognition
Claude Berri	director	July 1, 1934	January 12, 2009	1965 Best Live Action Short Subject win for Le Poulet; 1980 Best Picture nomination for Tess
Joseph M. Caracciolo	producer		June 8, 2008	
Cyd Charisse	actress	March 8, 1922	June 17, 2008	
Warren Cowan	publicist	May 13, 1921	May 14, 2008	
Michael Crichton	writer/director	October 23, 1942	November 4, 2008	1994 Technical Achievement Award
Jules Dassin	director	December 18, 1911	March 31, 2008	1960 Best Original Screenplay Writer and Best Director nominations for Pote tin Kyriaki
Robert DoQui	actor	April 20, 1934	February 9, 2008	
Manny Farber	film critic	February 20, 1917	August 18, 2008	
Nina Foch	actress	April 20, 1924	December 5, 2008	1954 Best Supporting Actress nomination for Executive Suite
Isaac Hayes	musician/actor	August 20, 1942	August 10, 2008	1971 Best Original Score nomination for Shaft; 1971 Best Original Song win for Shaft
John Michael Hayes	screenwriter	May 11, 1919	November 19, 2008	1954 Best Adapted Screenplay Writer nomination for Rear Window; 1957 Best Adapted Screenplay Writer nomination for Peyton Place
Charlton Heston	actor	October 4, 1923	April 5, 2008	1959 Best Actor win for Ben-Hur; 1977 Jean Hersholt Humanitarian Award
Pat Hingle	actor	July 19, 1924	January 3, 2009	
J. Paul Huntsman	sound editor	February 4, 1953	February 21, 2008	
Kon Ichikawa	director	November 20, 1915	February 13, 2008	
Charles H. Joffe	producer	July 16, 1929	July 9, 2008	1977 Best Picture win for Annie Hall
Ollie Johnston	animator	October 31, 1912	April 14, 2008	
Van Johnson	actor	August 25, 1916	December 12, 2008	
Evelyn Keyes	actress	December 26, 1916	March 24, 2008	
Bernie Mac	actor/comedian	October 5, 1957	August 9, 2008	
Abby Mann	screenwriter	December 1, 1927	March 25, 2008	1961 Best Adapted Screenplay Writer win for Judgment at Nuremberg; 1965 Best Adapted Screenplay Writer nomination for Ship of Fools
Anthony Minghella	director/producer	January 6, 1954	March 18, 2008	1996 Best Adapted Screenplay Writer nomination for The English Patient; 1996 Best Director win for The English Patient; 1999 Best Adapted Screenplay Writer nomination for The Talented Mr. Ripley; 2008 Best Picture nomination for The Reader
Ricardo Montalbán	actor	November 25, 1920	January 14, 2009	
Robert Mulligan	director	August 23, 1925	December 20, 2008	1962 Best Director nomination for To Kill a Mockingbird
Paul Newman	actor	January 26, 1925	September 26, 2008	1958 Best Actor nomination for Cat on a Hot Tin Roof; 1961 Best Actor nomination for The Hustler; 1963 Best Actor nomination for Hud; 1967 Best Actor nomination for Cool Hand Luke; 1968 Best Picture nomination for Rachel, Rachel; 1981 Best Actor nomination for Absence of Malice; 1982 Best Actor nomination for The Verdict; 1985 Honorary Award; 1987 Best Actor win for The Color of Money; 1993 Jean Hersholt Humanitarian Award; 1994 Best Actor nomination for Nobody's Fool (1994 film); 2002 Best Supporting Actor nomination for Road to Perdition
Maila Nurmi	actress	December 21, 1921	January 10, 2008	
Harold Pinter	writer	October 10, 1930	December 24, 2008	1981 Best Adapted Screenplay Writer nomination for The French Lieutenant's Woman; 1983 Best Adapted Screenplay Writer nomination for Betrayal
Sydney Pollack	director/producer	July 1, 1934	May 26, 2008	1969 Best Director nomination for They Shoot Horses, Don't They? 1982 Best Picture and Best Director nominations for Tootsie; 1985 Best Picture and Best Director wins for Out of Africa; 2007 Best Picture nomination for Michael Clayton; 2008 Best Picture nomination for The Reader
Leonard Rosenman	composer	September 7, 1924	March 4, 2008	1975 Best Original Score win for Barry Lyndon; 1976 Best Original Score win for Bound for Glory; 1983 Best Original Score nomination for Cross Creek; 1986 Best Original Score nomination for Star Trek IV: The Voyage Home
Roy Scheider	actor	November 10, 1932	February 10, 2008	1971 Best Supporting Actor nomination for The French Connection; 1979 Best Actor nomination for All That Jazz
Charles H. Schneer	producer	May 5, 1920	January 21, 2009	
Paul Scofield	actor	January 21, 1922	March 19, 2008	1966 Best Actor win for A Man for All Seasons; 1994 Best Supporting Actor nomination for Quiz Show
Bud Stone	executive	February 16, 1928	April 18, 2008	
Ned Tanen	executive producer	September 20, 1931	January 5, 2009	
David Watkin	director of photography	March 23, 1925	February 19, 2008	1985 Best Cinematography win for Out of Africa
James Whitmore	actor	October 1, 1921	February 6, 2009	1949 Best Supporting Actor nomination for Battleground; 1975 Best Actor nomination for Give 'em Hell, Harry!
Richard Widmark	actor	December 26, 1914	February 10, 2008	1947 Best Supporting Actor nomination for Kiss of Death
Stan Winston	special effects	April 7, 1946	June 15, 2008	1981 Best Makeup nomination for Heartbeeps; 1986 Best Visual Effects win for Aliens; 1987 Best Visual Effects nomination for Predator; 1990 Best Makeup nomination for Edward Scissorhands; 1991 Best Makeup and Best Visual Effects wins for Terminator 2: Judgment Day; 1992 Best Makeup nomination for Batman Returns; 1993 Best Visual Effects win for Jurassic Park; 1997 Best Visual Effects nomination for The Lost World: Jurassic Park; 2001 Best Visual Effects nomination for Artificial Intelligence: AI

== Explanations ==
During the tribute, an incorrect photograph of Kon Ichikawa was included. This necessitated a formal apology by the Academy of Motion Picture Arts and Sciences, which they have posted on their Oscar.org website. Maila Nurmi was included, although her death occurred in the prior February 1 – January 31 period, while James Whitmore was included although his death occurred after it. The Academy of Motion Picture Arts and Sciences compiles a list of those eligible for next years tribute based on having died after the annual February 1 cutoff.

Several past Academy Award nominees and winners were not included in the tribute. Many of those excluded were nominated writers: Irving Brecher – 1944 Writing (Screenplay) – Meet Me in St. Louis, Malvin Wald – 1948 Writing (Motion Picture Story) – The Naked City, Oscar Brodney – 1954 Writing (Story and Screenplay) – The Glenn Miller Story, Fred Haines – 1967 Writing (Screenplay based on material from another medium) – Ulysses, Donald E. Westlake – 1990 Writing (Screenplay based on material from another medium) – The Grifters. David Lee, a one-time winner for Sound in 2002 Chicago, was omitted. Two-time Music (Scoring: Original Song Score and Adaptation) nominee, Angela Morley, for 1974 – The Little Prince and 1977 – The Slipper and the Rose--The Story of Cinderella and two-time Documentary (Feature) nominee, Alex Grasshoff, for 1966 – The Really Big Family and 1973 – Journey to the Outer Limits were not included. Two Scientific or Technical Award (Class II) winners were omitted: Edward Efron – 1972 and James L. Wassell – 1962. Several other past one-time nominees were omitted: Howard G. Minsky – 1970 Best Picture – Love Story, J.C. Melendez – 1970 Music (Original Song Score) – A Boy Named Charlie Brown, Jonathan Bates – 1982 Sound – Gandhi, Edmund F. Penney – 1973 Documentary (Feature) – Walls of Fire, Maury Winetrobe – 1968 Film Editing – Funny Girl

Several other notable individuals, including George Carlin (six-time Emmy Award nominee), Bernie Brillstein (nine-time Emmy Award nominee), Neal Hefti (Emmy Award nominee) Beverly Garland (Emmy Award nominee), Estelle Getty (Emmy Award and Golden Globe Award winner), Eartha Kitt (Emmy Award nominee), Harvey Korman (four-time Emmy winner, Golden Globe Award winner), John Phillip Law (Golden Globe Award nominee), and Patrick McGoohan (two-time Emmy Award winner, BAFTA TV Award winner), were not included in the "In Memoriam" tribute, though they died within the year. Heath Ledger died shortly before the previous year's ceremony, and a tribute to him was included then.
