= 41st Academy Awards =

- Date: April 14, 1969
- Site: Dorothy Chandler Pavilion, Los Angeles
- Produced by: Gower Champion
- Directed by: Richard Dunlap; Gower Champion

Highlights
- Best Picture: Oliver!
- Most awards: Oliver! (5)
- Most nominations: Oliver! (11)

TV in the United States
- Network: ABC

The 41st Academy Awards were presented on April 14, 1969, to honor the films of 1968. They were the first Oscars to be staged at the Dorothy Chandler Pavilion, Los Angeles, and the first with no host since the 20th Academy Awards.

Oliver! became the only Best Picture winner to have received a G-rating prior to winning, the ratings system having replaced the old Hays Code on November 1, 1968 (though a number of Best Picture winners have received the rating retroactively). It was the last British film to win Best Picture until Chariots of Fire in 1982, and the last musical to win until Chicago in 2003.

The year was notable for the first—and so far, only—tie for Best Actress: Katharine Hepburn and Barbra Streisand shared the award, for their performances in The Lion in Winter and Funny Girl, respectively, marking the third occurrence of a tie in Oscar history. Hepburn became the second actress and third performer to win an acting Oscar two years in a row (having won for Guess Who's Coming to Dinner the previous year), after Luise Rainer in 1937 (The Great Ziegfeld) and 1938 (The Good Earth), and Spencer Tracy in 1938 (Captains Courageous) and 1939 (Boys Town). She also became the first to win three acting Oscars in lead categories (an achievement later matched by Daniel Day-Lewis and Frances McDormand).

Stanley Kubrick received his only career Oscar this year, for Best Visual Effects as special effects director and designer for 2001: A Space Odyssey.

Cliff Robertson's performance in Charly, which had received a mixed reception from critics and audiences, engendered controversy when he won the Academy Award for Best Actor. Less than two weeks after the ceremony, TIME mentioned the Academy's generalized concerns over "excessive and vulgar solicitation of votes" and said "many members agreed that Robertson's award was based more on promotion than on performance."

A few people griped over the failure of Paul Newman to get an Academy Award nomination for his direction of the film Rachel, Rachel, despite him receiving a Best Director award from the New York Film Critics Circle.

Also notable this year was the only instance to date of the Academy revoking an Oscar after the ceremony: Young Americans won the award for Best Documentary Feature Film, but on May 7, 1969, it was discovered that it had premiered in October 1967, thus making it ineligible. Journey into Self, the first runner-up, was awarded the Oscar the following day.

== Controversy over the Tonight Show announcing the winners hours before the ceremony ==
A minor controversy was created when, in a sketch on The Tonight Show, which was recorded three hours before the awards ceremony, Johnny Carson and Buddy Hackett announced Oliver! as the winner for Best Picture and Jack Albertson as Best Supporting Actor. Columnist Frances Drake claimed that most observers believed Carson and Hackett "were playing a huge practical joke or happened to make a lucky guess". Referring to it as "The Great Carson Hoax", PricewaterhouseCoopers stated in a 2004 press release that it was "later proven that Carson and Hackett made a few lucky guesses for their routine, dispelling rumors of a security breach and keeping the integrity of the balloting process intact". Carson would go on to host the ceremony five times.

== The televised ceremony ==
On the day after the broadcast, the live ABC television audience was estimated at 60 million in the United States. It was the first Oscars to be widely telecast throughout the world – live in the United States, Canada and Mexico, and licensed for delayed broadcast (Note: As per the Academy Report Volume 12 Number 2, December 1969 from the Margaret Herrick Library Digital Collections at Oscars.org, "The broadcast was presented abroad in an abbreviated, one-hour form on a trial basis.") in at least 30 other countries. (Note: As of publication prior to the April 14, 1969 broadcast, the 30 countries were: "United Kingdom, Australia, Korea, Venezuela, Argentina, Austria, Greece, Holland, Finland, Italy, New Zealand, Uruguay, Chile, Costa Rica, Guatemala, Panama, Nicaragua, the Dominican Republic, Ecuador, San Salvador, Honduras, Norway, Spain, Portugal, Belgium, Switzerland, Thailand, Singapore, Hong Kong and the Philippines" as per the Academy Report, Volume 12 Number 1, April 1969 from the Margaret Herrick Library Digital Collections at Oscars.org. But the article noted that "several other countries may soon be added to the roster".) (Note: As per the Academy Museum website: the 1969 show "is broadcast to 37 countries in a 56-minute 'capsule' version.")

The show opened outdoors at night in downtown Los Angeles. English actors Ron Moody and sixteen-year-old Jack Wild were in character as Fagin and the Artful Dodger, from Best Picture nominee Oliver!. Fagin assured Dodger that if they didn't win the golden statuette, they would "pinch it."

The president of the academy, Gregory Peck, taped a pre-recorded opening (Note: The stage manager Selig Frank's 41st Academy Awards 1969 production binder script on eBay has handwritten notes indicating that both the opening Oliver! skit and Gregory Peck's intro were "pre-taped".) in the empty lobby of the new venue, the Dorothy Chandler Pavilion. Peck introduced Ingrid Bergman, the first of ten "friends of Oscar." Each actor presented the next in turn, with Jane Fonda introducing Frank Sinatra as "Nancy Sinatra's dad." Sinatra responded by thanking "Henry Fonda Junior." Tony Curtis was a last-minute replacement for Warren Beatty, who had the mumps.

Jack Albertson was presented with the first award of the night – Best Supporting Actor. Albertson got choked up thanking Frank D. Gilroy, the screenwriter of The Subject Was Roses.

The teleprompter was not yet invented, so the presenters read off of handwritten cue cards. During the Best Original Screenplay presentation (which was won by Mel Brooks for The Producers), comedian Don Rickles carried a cue card up to Frank Sinatra at the podium.

A surprise "friend of Oscar" was revealed by Walter Matthau; a little monkey dressed in a tux brought John Chambers the statuette for special achievement in makeup for Planet of the Apes.

Ten-year-old Mark Lester, who portrayed the title role of Oliver!, handed an honorary Oscar to the musical's Canadian choreographer, Onna White.

Towards the end of the ceremony, Bob Hope presented an emotional Martha Raye with the Jean Hersholt Humanitarian Award. (Note: As per the Academy Report, Volume 12 Number 2, December 1969, Raye was the first woman to win the Jean Hersholt Humanitarian Award.) Hope, the host of seventeen previous Oscar shows, quipped "I finally made it," adding that he had been waiting at the Santa Monica Civic Auditorium, the Oscar home from 1961 to 1968.

Hope later observed that "Oscar is more naked than usual...They're doing things on the screen today I wouldn't do in bed, even if I had the chance."

Ruth Gordon won Best Supporting Actress as the nosy neighbour in Roman Polanski's Rosemary's Baby. The 72-year-old actress exclaimed, "I can't tell you how encouraging a thing like this is!" In closing Gordon said, "thank all of you who voted for me, and all of you who didn't – please excuse me."

The director and choreographer Gower Champion wanted the show to appeal to a younger audience. He relaxed the dress code from white tie and tails to black tie and tuxedos. He reduced the show's length to two hours, partly by easing access to the stage with a wide center ramp over the orchestra pit. The brevity of several speeches also contributed to the overall running time.

Champion also targeted the youth market "with a little help from" Jane Fonda's friends, The Soul Rascals. (Note: Jane Fonda's scripted line in the show production script was "with a little help from my friends, The Soul Rascals.") The rock group played cover songs as choreographed dancers displayed the Best Costume designs. Danilo Donati, the costume designer for Franco Zeffirelli's Romeo and Juliet, was not present, so Fonda handed the Oscar to the dancers portraying the star-crossed lovers as a "symbolic" gesture.

Throughout the ceremony Champion introduced rear-screen projection of photos and film excerpts onto five movable screens that filled the stage.

This rear projection was used to set-up the Best Actress category. A "choreographed" photo montage of Katharine Hepburn in The Lion in Winter, Patricia Neal in The Subject Was Roses, Vanessa Redgrave (Note: Best Actress nominee, Vanessa Redgrave was pregnant and attended the awards ceremony with actor Franco Nero, the father of Carlo Gabriel Redgrave Nero, as per this photo from the Academy Awards show photographs, Margaret Herrick Library, Academy of Motion Picture Arts and Sciences.) in Isadora, Barbra Streisand in Funny Girl and Joanne Woodward in Rachel, Rachel, was displayed on the massive screens. The orchestra, conducted by music director Henry Mancini, played an instrumental arrangement of Lew Spence and Alan Bergman's 1957 song "That Face." (Note: In the show production script this segment is described as a "choreographed montage of slides of the five nominees for best actress projected on the screens onstage, underscored as a cinematic ballet". Ingrid Bergman enters to podium left and says, "There they are...the best actresses of 1968.")

Announcing the best actress winners, Ingrid Bergman gasped "It's a tie!" According to an Academy spokesperson in 1969, the actual vote count by the 3,030 eligible Academy members was "never divulged". (Note: As per the Turner Classic Movies Funny Girl trivia article on its website, "The accounting firm of Price Waterhouse confirmed that they counted and re-counted the votes, and it was an exact tie.")

Katharine Hepburn was not in attendance, so 38-year-old Anthony Harvey, the English director of The Lion in Winter, accepted on her behalf.

Twenty-six year old Barbra Streisand briefly tripped, stepping on the bell-bottomed leg of her Arnold Scaasi-designed pantsuit, en route to the stage. (Note: Anthony Harvey claimed that he "stood on her [Streisand's] dress, and it ripped," as per The Hollywood Reporter)

Streisand was shocked to discover her Scaasi suit appeared transparent under the stage lights and photographers' flashes.

Looking down at her Oscar, Streisand said "Hello, gorgeous!" – her opening line from Funny Girl. She acknowledged the honor of "being in such magnificent company as Katharine Hepburn."

Sidney Poitier had the distinction of presenting Best Picture, the final award of the night, declaring that "1968 was really a vintage year for motion pictures."

Later that night at the Governors Ball held in the Beverly Hilton Hotel, the show's producer, director and choreographer Gower Champion was applauded for his achievement. The show earned mostly favourable reviews for its informality, look and pace, but some critics lamented the lack of glamour of previous Oscar nights. (Note: The show was written by Tom Waldman and his brother Frank Waldman as per the article "Champion Completes Production Staff; Show Plans on Schedule" in the Academy Report in the Margaret Herrick Library Digital Collection at Oscars.org)

== Winners and nominees ==
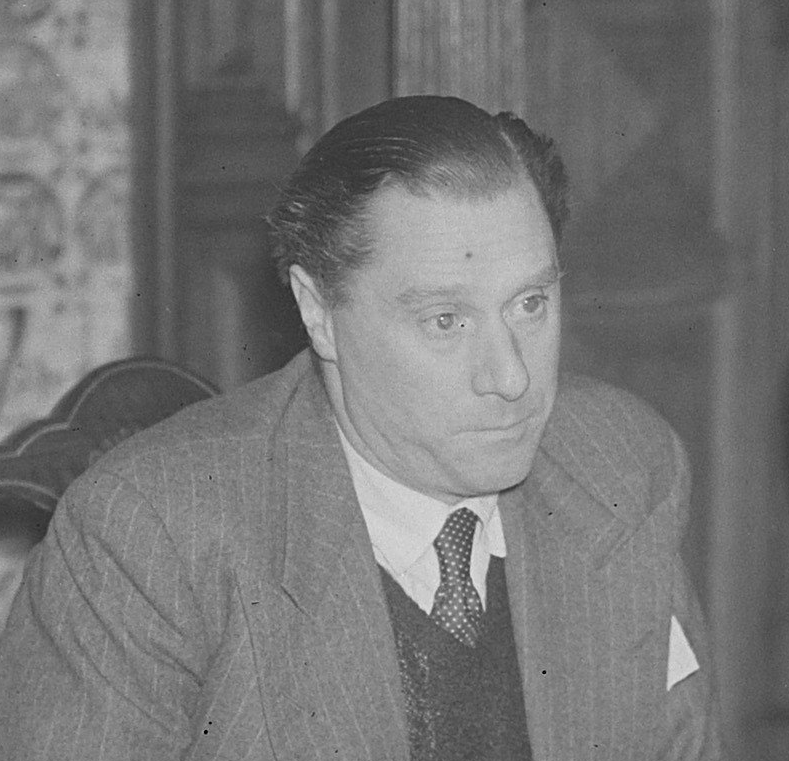
Carol Reed, Best Director winner

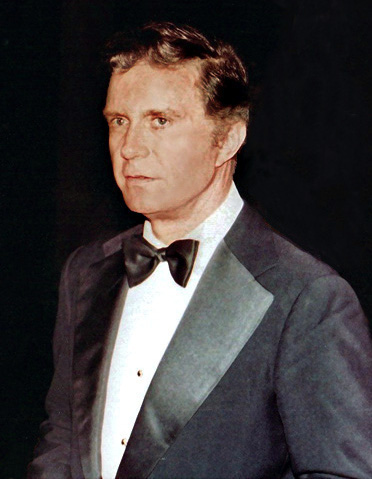
Cliff Robertson, Best Actor winner

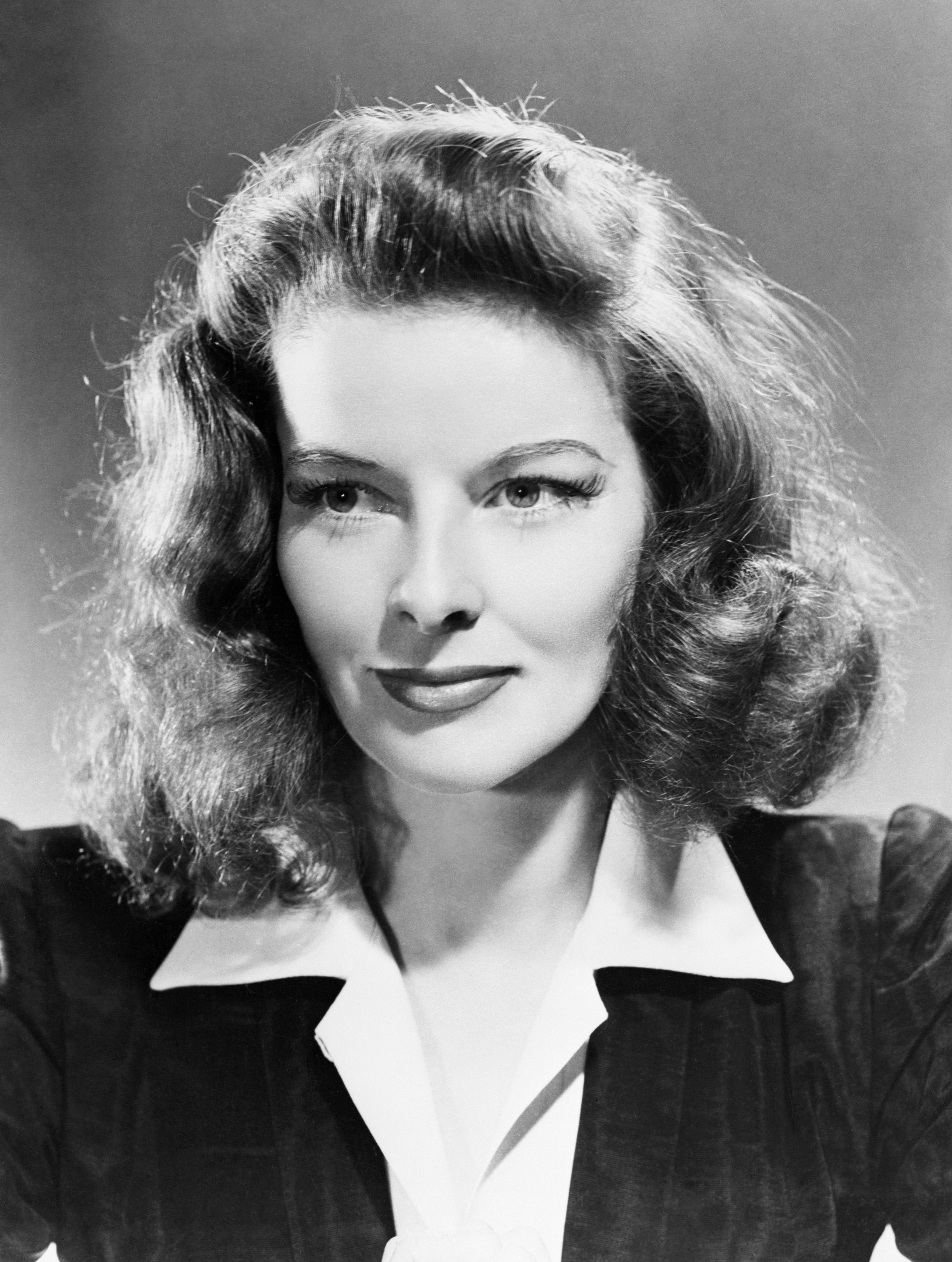
Katharine Hepburn, Best Actress co-winner

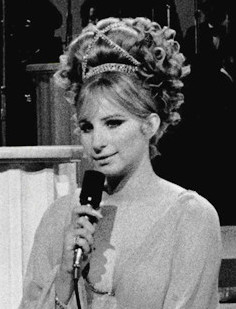
Barbra Streisand, Best Actress co-winner

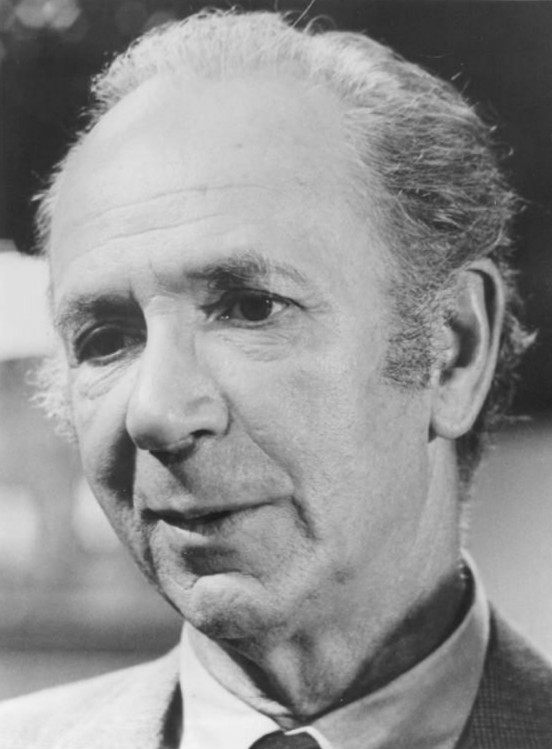
Jack Albertson, Best Supporting Actor winner

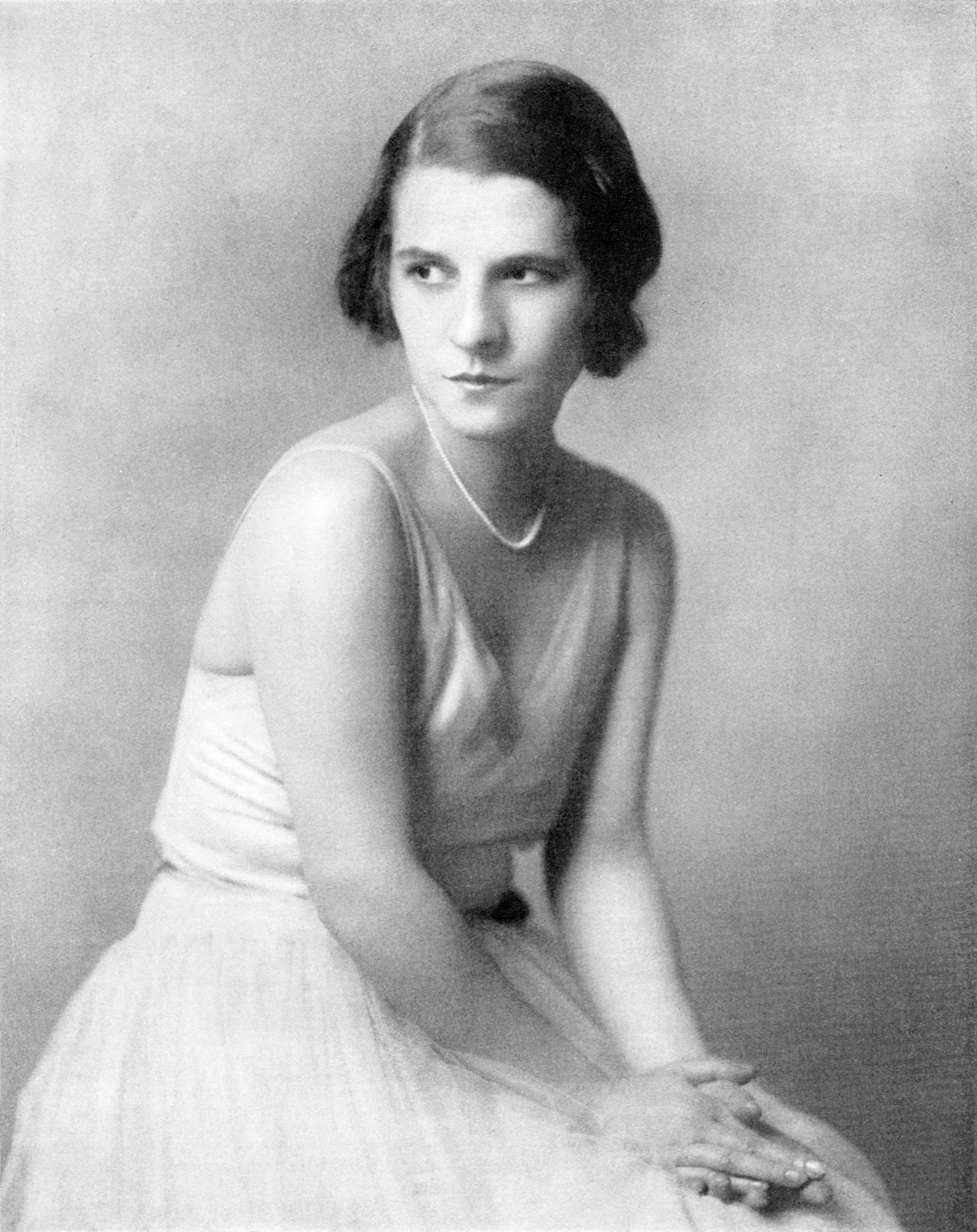
Ruth Gordon, Best Supporting Actress winner

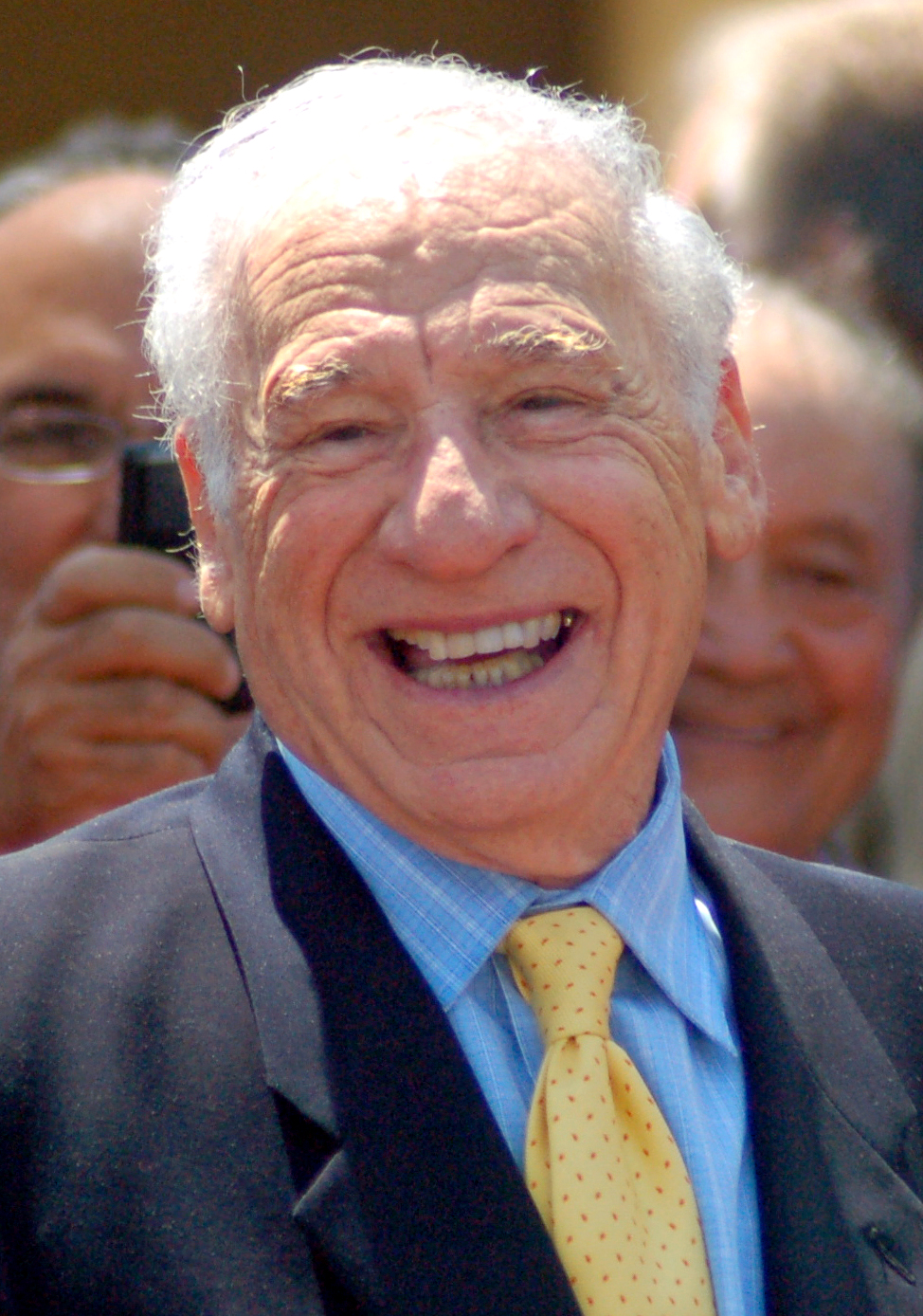
Mel Brooks, Best Original Screenplay winner

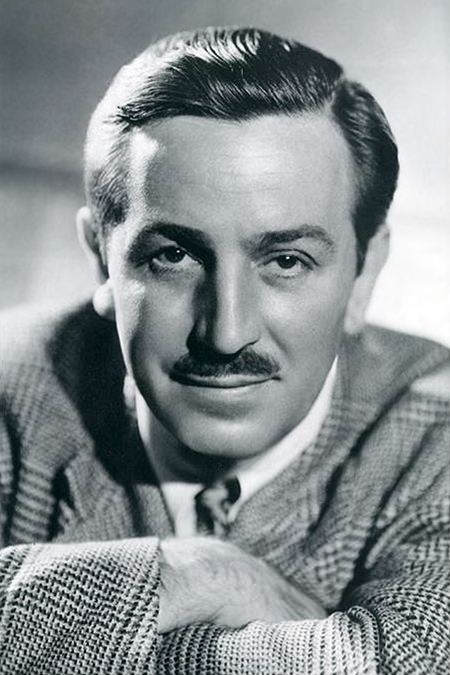
Walt Disney, Best Animated Short Film winner

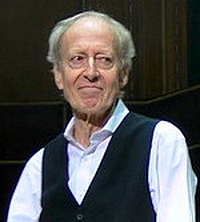
John Barry, Best Original Score (Not a Musical) winner

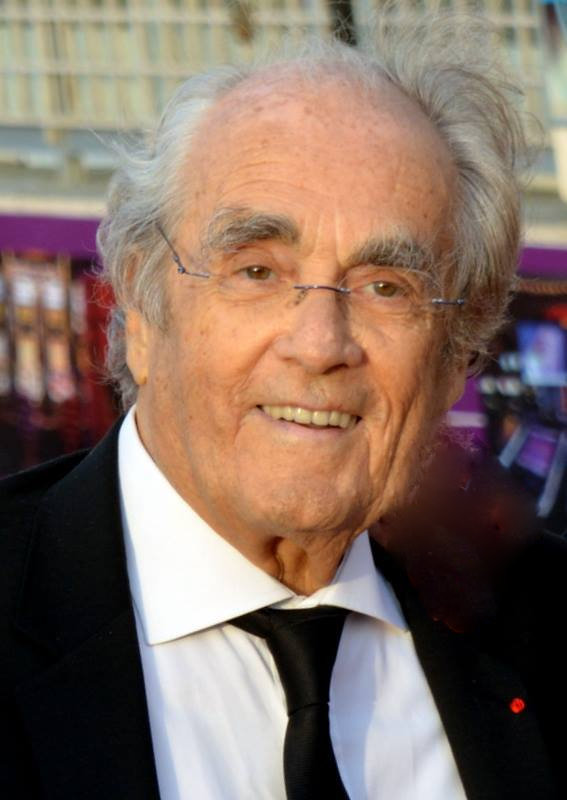
Michel Legrand, Best Original Song co-winner

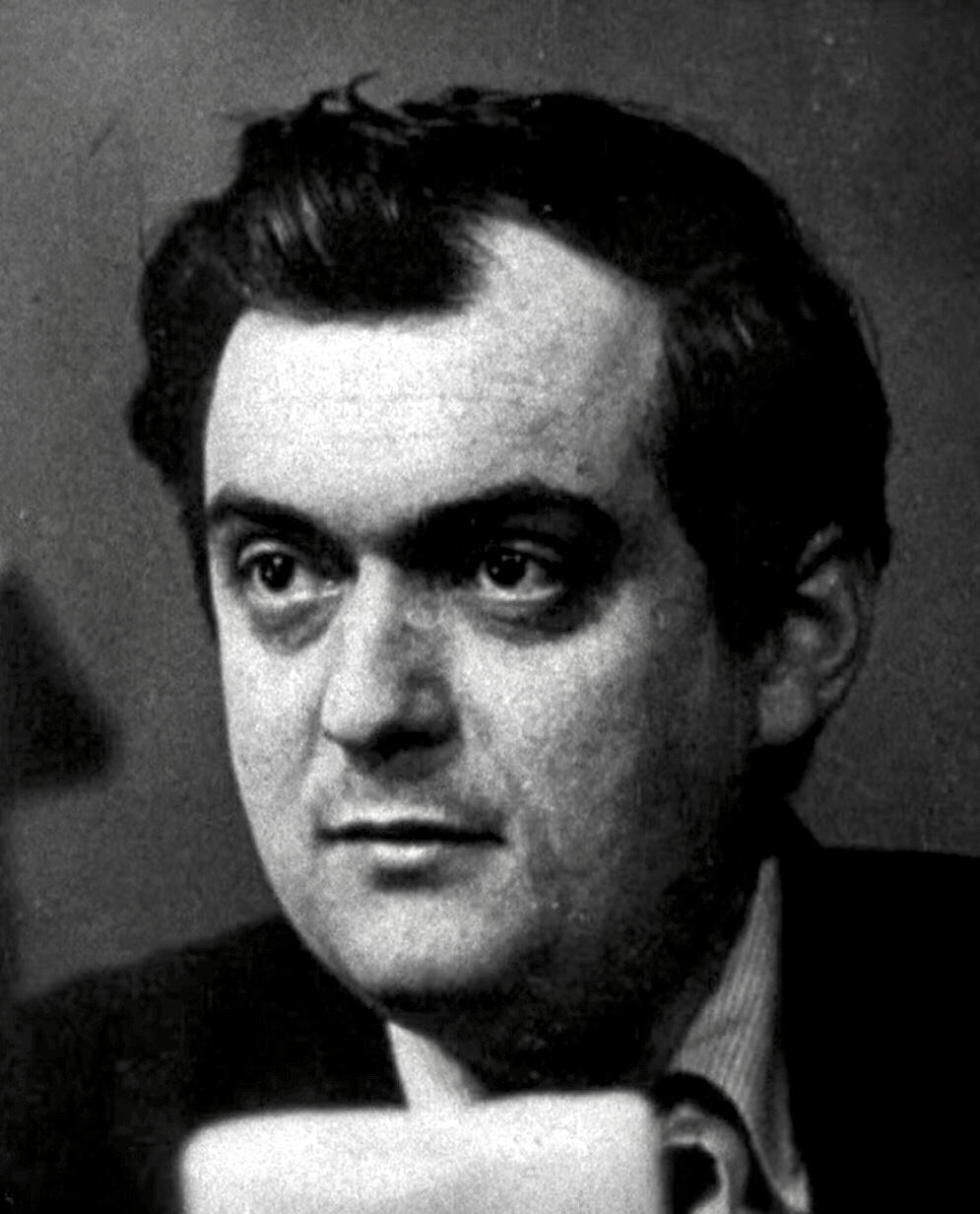
Stanley Kubrick, Best Visual Effects winner

Nominees were announced on February 24, 1969. Winners are listed first and highlighted in boldface.

**Best Picture**: **Oliver! – John Woolf, producer**; Funny Girl – Ray Stark, producer; The Lion in Winter – Martin Poll, producer; Rachel, Rachel – Paul Newman, producer; Romeo and Juliet – John Brabourne and Anthony Havelock-Allan, producers	**Best Directing**: **Carol Reed – Oliver!**; Stanley Kubrick – 2001: A Space Odyssey; Gillo Pontecorvo – The Battle of Algiers; Anthony Harvey – The Lion in Winter; Franco Zeffirelli – Romeo and Juliet
**Best Actor**: **Cliff Robertson – Charly as Charly Gordon**; Alan Arkin – The Heart Is a Lonely Hunter as John Singer; Alan Bates – The Fixer as Yakov Bok; Ron Moody – Oliver! as Fagin; Peter O'Toole – The Lion in Winter as King Henry II of England	**Best Actress**: **Katharine Hepburn – The Lion in Winter as Eleanor of Aquitaine**; **Barbra Streisand – Funny Girl as Fanny Brice**; Patricia Neal – The Subject Was Roses as Nettie Cleary; Vanessa Redgrave – Isadora as Isadora Duncan; Joanne Woodward – Rachel, Rachel as Rachel Cameron
**Best Actor in a Supporting Role**: **Jack Albertson – The Subject Was Roses as John Cleary**; Seymour Cassel – Faces as Chet; Daniel Massey – Star! as Noël Coward; Jack Wild – Oliver! as Jack Dawkins ("The Artful Dodger"); Gene Wilder – The Producers as Leo Bloom	**Best Actress in a Supporting Role**: **Ruth Gordon – Rosemary's Baby as Minnie Castevet**; Lynn Carlin – Faces as Maria Frost; Sondra Locke – The Heart Is a Lonely Hunter as Mick Kelly; Kay Medford – Funny Girl as Rose Stern Borach; Estelle Parsons – Rachel, Rachel as Calla Mackie
**Best Writing (Story and Screenplay -- Written Directly for the Screen)**: **The Producers – Mel Brooks**; 2001: A Space Odyssey – Stanley Kubrick and Arthur C. Clarke; The Battle of Algiers – Franco Solinas and Gillo Pontecorvo; Faces – John Cassavetes; Hot Millions – Ira Wallach and Peter Ustinov	**Best Writing (Screenplay -- Based on Material from Another Medium)**: **The Lion in Winter – James Goldman based on his play**; The Odd Couple – Neil Simon based on his play; Oliver! – Vernon Harris based on the stage musical by Lionel Bart and Oliver Twist by Charles Dickens; Rachel, Rachel – Stewart Stern based on the novel A Jest of God by Margaret Laurence; Rosemary's Baby – Roman Polanski based on the novel by Ira Levin
**Best Foreign Language Film**: **War and Peace – U.S.S.R.**; The Boys of Paul Street – Hungary; The Firemen's Ball – Czechoslovakia; The Girl with the Pistol – Italy; Stolen Kisses – France	**Best Documentary (Feature)**: **Journey into Self – Bill McGaw** (Note: Awarded on May 8, 1969, as the runner-up); ~~**Young Americans – Robert Cohn and Alex Grasshoff**~~ (award revoked); A Few Notes on Our Food Problem – U.S. Information Agency; Legendary Champions – William Cayton; Other Voices – David H. Sawyer
**Best Documentary (Short Subject)**: **Why Man Creates – Saul Bass**; The House That Ananda Built – Films Division, Government of India; The Revolving Door – Vision Associates Production for the American Foundation Institute of Corrections; A Space to Grow – Office of Economic Opportunity for Project Upward Bound; A Way Out of the Wilderness – Dan E. Weisburd	**Best Short Subject (Live Action)**: **Robert Kennedy Remembered – Guggenheim Productions**; The Dove – Coe-Davis Ltd.; Duo – National Film Board of Canada; Prelude – Prelude Co.
**Best Short Subject (Cartoon)**: **Winnie the Pooh and the Blustery Day – Walt Disney** (posthumous award); The House That Jack Built – National Film Board of Canada; The Magic Pear Tree – Murakami-Wolf Films; Windy Day – Hubley Studios	**Best Music (Original Score -- for a Motion Picture (Not a Musical))**: **The Lion in Winter – John Barry**; The Fox – Lalo Schifrin; Planet of the Apes – Jerry Goldsmith; The Shoes of the Fisherman – Alex North; The Thomas Crown Affair – Michel Legrand
**Best Music (Score of a Musical Picture -- Original or Adaptation)**: **Oliver! – Johnny Green**; Finian's Rainbow – Ray Heindorf; Funny Girl – Walter Scharf; Star! – Lennie Hayton; The Young Girls of Rochefort – Adaptation: Michel Legrand; Song Score: Michel Legrand and Jacques Demy	**Best Song Original for the Picture**: **"The Windmills of Your Mind" from The Thomas Crown Affair – Music by Michel Legrand; Lyrics by Alan and Marilyn Bergman**; "Chitty Chitty Bang Bang" from Chitty Chitty Bang Bang – Music and Lyrics by The Sherman Brothers: Richard M. Sherman and Robert B. Sherman; "For Love of Ivy" from For Love of Ivy – Music by Quincy Jones; Lyrics by Bob Russell; "Funny Girl" from Funny Girl – Music by Jule Styne; Lyrics by Bob Merrill; "Star!" from Star! – Music by Jimmy Van Heusen; Lyrics by Sammy Cahn
**Best Sound**: **Oliver! – Shepperton Studio Sound Dept.**; Bullitt – Warner Bros.-Seven Arts Studio Sound Dept.; Finian's Rainbow – Warner Bros.-Seven Arts Studio Sound Dept.; Funny Girl – Columbia Studio Sound Dept.; Star! – Twentieth Century-Fox Studio Sound Dept.	**Best Art Direction**: **Oliver! – Art Direction: John Box and Terence Marsh; Set Decoration: Vernon Dixon and Ken Muggleston**; 2001: A Space Odyssey – Art Direction and Set Decoration: Anthony Masters, Harry Lange and Ernest Archer; The Shoes of the Fisherman – Art Direction and Set Decoration: George W. Davis and Edward Carfagno; Star! – Art Direction: Boris Leven; Set Decoration: Walter M. Scott and Howard Bristol; War and Peace – Art Direction: Mikhail Bogdanov and Gennady Myasnikov; Set Decoration: G. Koshelev and V. Uvarov
**Best Cinematography**: **Romeo and Juliet – Pasqualino De Santis**; Funny Girl – Harry Stradling; Ice Station Zebra – Daniel L. Fapp; Oliver! – Oswald Morris; Star! – Ernest Laszlo	**Best Costume Design**: **Romeo and Juliet – Danilo Donati**; The Lion in Winter – Margaret Furse; Oliver! – Phyllis Dalton; Planet of the Apes – Morton Haack; Star! – Donald Brooks
**Best Film Editing**: **Bullitt – Frank P. Keller**; Funny Girl – Robert Swink, Maury Winetrobe and William Sands; The Odd Couple – Frank Bracht; Oliver! – Ralph Kemplen; Wild in the Streets – Fred R. Feitshans Jr. and Eve Newman	**Best Special Visual Effects**: **2001: A Space Odyssey – Stanley Kubrick**; Ice Station Zebra – Hal Millar and Joseph McMillan Johnson

=== Honorary Awards ===
- To John Chambers for his outstanding makeup achievement for Planet of the Apes.
- To Onna White for her outstanding choreography achievement for Oliver!

=== Jean Hersholt Humanitarian Award ===
- Martha Raye

=== Multiple nominations and awards ===
These films had multiple nominations:

- 11 nominations: Oliver! (Note: Not including the Honorary Award for Oliver!.)
- 8 nominations: Funny Girl
- 7 nominations: The Lion in Winter and Star!
- 4 nominations: 2001: A Space Odyssey, Rachel, Rachel, and Romeo and Juliet
- 3 nominations: Faces
- 2 nominations: The Battle of Algiers, Bullitt, Finian's Rainbow, The Heart Is a Lonely Hunter, Ice Station Zebra, The Odd Couple, Planet of the Apes, The Producers, Rosemary's Baby, The Shoes of the Fisherman, The Subject Was Roses, The Thomas Crown Affair, and War and Peace

The following films received multiple awards:

- 5 wins: Oliver!
- 3 wins: The Lion in Winter
- 2 wins: Romeo and Juliet

=== Presenters ===
- Ingrid Bergman (Presenter: Best Actress and Best Cinematography)
- Ingrid Bergman, Diahann Carroll, Jane Fonda, Rosalind Russell and Natalie Wood (Presenters: Best Director)
- Diahann Carroll (Presenter: Best Special Visual Effects, Documentary Awards & the Honorary Award to Onna White)
- Tony Curtis (Presenter: Best Supporting Actress, Short Subjects Awards and Documentary Awards)
- Jane Fonda (Presenter: Best Foreign Language Film, Best Costume Design and Short Subjects Awards)
- Bob Hope (Presenter: Jean Hersholt Humanitarian Award to Martha Raye)
- Burt Lancaster (Presenter: Best Actor, Best Special Visual Effects and the Scientific or Technical Awards)
- Mark Lester (Presenter: Honorary Academy Award to Onna White)
- Henry Mancini and Marni Nixon (Presenter: Best Original or Adaptation Score)
- Walter Matthau (Presenter: Best Film Editing & the Honorary Award to John Chambers)
- Gregory Peck (Presenter: Best Original Score for a Motion Picture (Not a Musical))
- Pink Panther (Presentation: Best Short Subject – Cartoons)
- Sidney Poitier (Presenter: Best Picture)
- Don Rickles (Presenter: Best Story and Screenplay Written Directly for the Screen)
- Rosalind Russell (Presenter: Best Original Score for a Motion Picture (Not a Musical), Best Sound and Screenplay Based on Material from Another Medium Awards)
- Frank Sinatra (Presenter: Best Supporting Actor, Best Song Original for the Picture and Writing Awards)
- Natalie Wood (Presenter: Best Art Direction and the Scientific or Technical Awards)

=== Performers ===
- José Feliciano ("The Windmills of Your Mind" from The Thomas Crown Affair)
- Aretha Franklin ("Funny Girl" from Funny Girl)
- Abbey Lincoln ("For Love of Ivy" from For Love of Ivy)
- Paula Kelly and the UCLA Band ("Chitty Chitty Bang Bang" from Chitty Chitty Bang Bang)
- Frank Sinatra ("Star!" from Star!)

== See also ==
- 1968 in film
- 11th Grammy Awards
- 20th Primetime Emmy Awards
- 21st Primetime Emmy Awards
- 22nd British Academy Film Awards
- 23rd Tony Awards
- 26th Golden Globe Awards
