= Kambalny =

Stratovolcano in southern Kamchatka

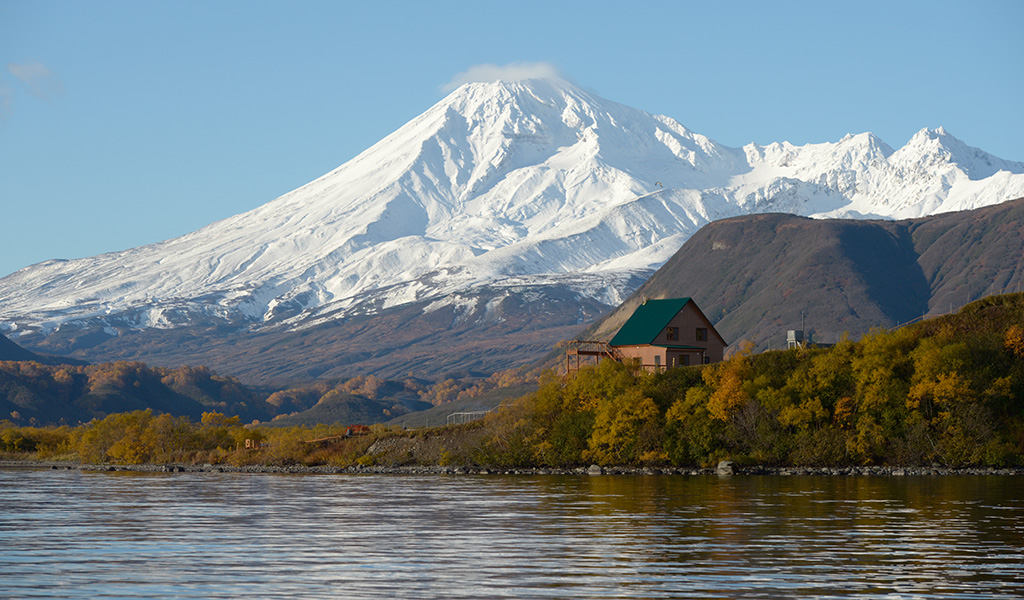

Highest point
- Elevation: 2,156 m (7,073 ft)
- Prominence: 1,970 m (6,460 ft)
- Listing: Ultra, Ribu
- Coordinates: 51°18′20″N 156°52′31″E

Geography
- Location within Russia Location within Kamchatka Krai
- Location: Kamchatka, Russia
- Parent range: Eastern Range

Geology
- Rock age: Holocene
- Mountain type: Stratovolcano
- Last eruption: 2017

Kambalny (Russian: Камбальный) is a stratovolcano located in the southern part of the Kamchatka Peninsula, Russia. It is the southernmost active volcano of Kamchatka. It has erupted mafic rocks. It has a summit crater as well as five cinder cones on its flanks which are the source of lava flows.

The volcano probably formed during the early Holocene and aside from the summit crater also features an explosion crater on the southwestern side of the summit. Three large collapses of the edifice occurred around 6300 BP; between the first two volcanic activity restored the cone, while the third occurred on the ridge on which Kambalny was constructed. The longest of these landslides travelled 20 kilometres (12 mi). The total volume of these landslides, 5–10 cubic kilometres (1.2–2.4 cu mi), is the largest of all Holocene landslides, but it was buried at Kambalny proper by later volcanic activity. The collapse scar in the ridge is still visible and was the site of later landslides when Kambalny volcano was active.

Kambalny is part of a group of volcanoes from the late Pleistocene and the Holocene that surround the Kurile Lake caldera. Other volcanoes in that group are Diky Greben, Ilyinsky, Koshelev and Zheltovsky. Kambalny itself is constructed on a ridge which formed in the Quaternary during the uplift of the central part of a trough. This trough is also the site of the Pleistocene Pauzhetka Caldera and Kambalny formed on this caldera rim. Other volcanoes in the area include Thermalny, North Kambalny and Chernye Skaly. The position of Kambalny is also controlled by the margin between the Kurile island arc and the South Kamchatka block.

The cone rises about 1,800 metres (5,900 ft) above the surrounding terrain. The Pauzhetsky geothermal field is associated with the Kambalny volcanic ridge, and Kambalny may be the heat source for this system or a separate system. The geothermal energy output at Kambalny is about 320 megawatts (320,000,000 W) and spread across three distinct areas. Fumarolic activity along with the emission of CO_{2}, H_{2}S and CH_{4} occur in the area of Kambalny. These fumaroles have left efflorescences that are derived from compounds leached from rocks and which have yielded novel minerals. The volcanic rocks have been weathered to form clays and secondary minerals. The geothermal field is subdivided into three sectors, Severo-Kambalny ("North-Kambalny"), Central'no Kambalny ("Central Kambalny") and Yuzhno-Kambalny ("South-Kambalny").

== Recent eruption history ==
The last eruption from Kambalny occurred on March 24, 2017 when ash emission was observed that continued for six days. Ash emissions hindered air travel over the Pacific Ocean. The ash originated in a funnel in the western crater flank; it formed mud streams and appears to have originated in a phreatic eruption. The last known volcanic activity prior to 2017 was in 1769. Future volcanic activity from the volcano may be a threat to the Mutnovsky geothermal operations. Further, additional large collapses of the edifice are possible, which may endanger hunters, fishermen and tourists. As of June 2012, the volcano has no associated seismic station but it is monitored by the Kamchatkan Volcanic Eruption Response Team since 2002. Before the 2017 eruption, three days of increased seismic activity were noted.

The volcano began to grow 8,000-7,500 years ago. Other eruptions took place 8,000, 7,500, 600 and possibly 200 years ago; before 2017 it had been inactive for two centuries. The ash erupted during a phreatic eruption 564–686 years BP is a marker ash that has been found as far as Paramushir island in the northern portion of the Kuril Islands. Tephras younger than this date have been identified as well.

== See also ==
- List of volcanoes in Russia
- List of ultras of Northeast Asia

== Other references ==
- "Kambalny Volcano" VolcanoLive.com

== Sources ==
- Gordeev, E. I.; Girina, O. A.; Gorbach, N. V.; Manevich, A. G.; Melnikov, D. V.; Anikin, L. P.; Manevich, T. M.; Dubrovskaya, I. K.; Chirkov, S. A.; Kartashova, E. V. (9 November 2018). "First Historical Eruption of Kambalny Volcano" (PDF). Doklady Earth Sciences. 482 (2): 1257–1259. Bibcode:2018DokES.482.1257G. doi:10.1134/S1028334X18100045. S2CID 133773842.
- Ismagilova, Rezeda M.; Nuzhdaev, Anton A.; Shilovskikh, Vladimir V.; Belakovsky, Dmitry I.; Siidra, Oleg I.; Zhitova, Elena S. (2018). "Ammoniovoltaite, (NH4)2Fe2+5Fe3+3Al(SO4)12(H2O)18, a new mineral from the Severo-Kambalny geothermal field, Kamchatka, Russia". Mineralogical Magazine. 82 (5): 1057–1077. Bibcode:2018MinM...82.1057Z. doi:10.1180/minmag.2017.081.083. ISSN 0026-461X. S2CID 133719658.
- Ponomareva, Vera V.; Melekestsev, Ivan V.; Dirksen, Oleg V. (November 2006). "Sector collapses and large landslides on Late Pleistocene–Holocene volcanoes in Kamchatka, Russia" (PDF). Journal of Volcanology and Geothermal Research. 158 (1–2): 117–138. Bibcode:2006JVGR..158..117P. doi:10.1016/j.jvolgeores.2006.04.016.
