= 1969 Academy Awards =

1969 Academy Awards may refer to:

- 41st Academy Awards, the Academy Awards ceremony that took place in 1969
- 42nd Academy Awards, the 1970 ceremony honoring the best in film for 1969
