= Richard Moore (cinematographer) =

American cinematographer and film director (1925-2009)

- Born: John Richard Moore; October 4, 1925; Jacksonville, Illinois, U.S.
- Died: August 16, 2009 (aged 83); Palm Springs, California, U.S.
- Other name: John R. Moore
- Education: USC School of Cinematic Arts
- Occupations: Cinematographer, film director, co-founder of Panavision

John Richard Moore, ASC (October 4, 1925 - August 16, 2009) was an American cinematographer and film director. He was known for his innovations in widescreen photography, co-founding Panavision in 1954 and co-creating the MGM Camera 65 process. He received a Scientific and Engineering Oscar for the latter.

== Early life and education ==
Moore was born in Jacksonville, Illinois, on October 4, 1925. He received a bachelor's degree in cinema from the University of Southern California. Following graduation, Moore began working on travelogues and documentaries.

== Career ==
=== Panavision ===
Moore collaborated with Robert Gottschalk in 1953 to co-found Panavision, a motion picture equipment company specializing in cameras and lenses. Among the company's innovations, Panavision developed a specific camera lens for use in the Cinemascope widescreen format, and the Panaflex lightweight film camera.

In a 2005 interview with Daily Variety, Moore explained that his connections with Panavision seemed to him to be purely by chance, "Becoming a cameraman and becoming part of Panavision was strictly -- I don't know what you'd call it -- luck or fate. It's something that I didn't plan on. It just happened."

He shared the Scientific and Engineering Award (with Douglas Shearer) from the Academy of Motion Picture Arts and Sciences in 1959, for the development of the MGM Camera 65 widescreen process.

Moore left Panavision nine years after the company was founded. His daughter, Marina Moore, explained that he departed Panavision because he "didn't want a desk job."

=== Cinematographer ===
Moore's first director-of-photography credit was 1965's Operation C.I.A., a low-budget spy film shot in the Philippines, starring Burt Reynolds and Kieu Chinh. During the 1960's and 70's, Moore shot a variety of films including The Wild Angels, Devil's Angels, and Wild in the Streets for American International Pictures; Sydney Pollack's The Scalphunters, and Myra Breckinridge. He also shot several episodes of the television series Daktari, and the documentary Young Americans.

He had several collaborations with Paul Newman, beginning as an uncredited camera operator on Harper and finally shooting Newman's 1971 directorial effort Sometimes a Great Notion. He also had a partnership with John Huston, shooting The Life and Times of Judge Roy Bean (1972) and Annie (1982), as well as additional photography on Fat City (also 1972).

In 2004, Moore received the American Society of Cinematographers' President's Award.

=== Director ===
Moore directed the 1978 martial arts film Circle of Iron, which co-starred David Carradine and Christopher Lee. He produced, directed and shot television commercials throughout his career.

== Personal life ==
Moore was married three times. His first marriage, to singer Margaret Whiting, ended in divorce in 1958. He had a son, Stephen, and two daughters, Marina Lisa and Martita Laura (died 1994). Marina was born in the Bahamas while Moore was shooting underwater scenes for the 1965 James Bond film, Thunderball.

=== Death ===
Moore died at his home in Palm Springs, California, on August 16, 2009, aged 83.

== Filmography ==
=== Film ===
==== Director ====
Year	Title
1978	Circle of Iron

==== Cinematographer ====
Year	Title	Director	Notes
1965	Operation C.I.A.	Christian Nyby	
1966	The Wild Angels	Roger Corman	
1967	Devil's Angels	Daniel Haller	
1967	Young Americans	Alex Grasshoff	Documentary
1968	Maryjane	Maury Dexter	
1968	Wild in the Streets	Barry Shear	
1968	The Scalphunters	Sydney Pollack	
1969	Changes	Hall Bartlett	
1969	Winning	James Goldstone	
1969	Mackenna's Gold	J. Lee Thompson	Additional photography
1969	The Reivers	Mark Rydell	
1970	Myra Breckinridge	Mike Sarne	
1970	WUSA	Stuart Rosenberg	
1971	Sometimes a Great Notion	Paul Newman	
1972	The Life and Times of Judge Roy Bean	John Huston	
1972	Fat City	John Huston	Additional photography
1973	The Stone Killer	Michael Winner	
1982	Annie	John Huston	

=== Television ===
==== Cinematographer ====
Year	Title	Notes
1966	ABC Stage 67	Episode: "The People Trap"
1966-69	Daktari	
1971	Aesop's Fables	TV movie
1975	Hey, I'm Alive	TV movie
