= 1968 Academy Awards =

1968 Academy Awards may refer to:

- 40th Academy Awards, the Academy Awards ceremony that took place in 1968
- 41st Academy Awards, the 1969 ceremony honoring the best in film for 1968
