= Kurile Lake =

Caldera lake in the Kamchatka peninsula, Russia

- Kurilskoe Lake, Kuril Lake
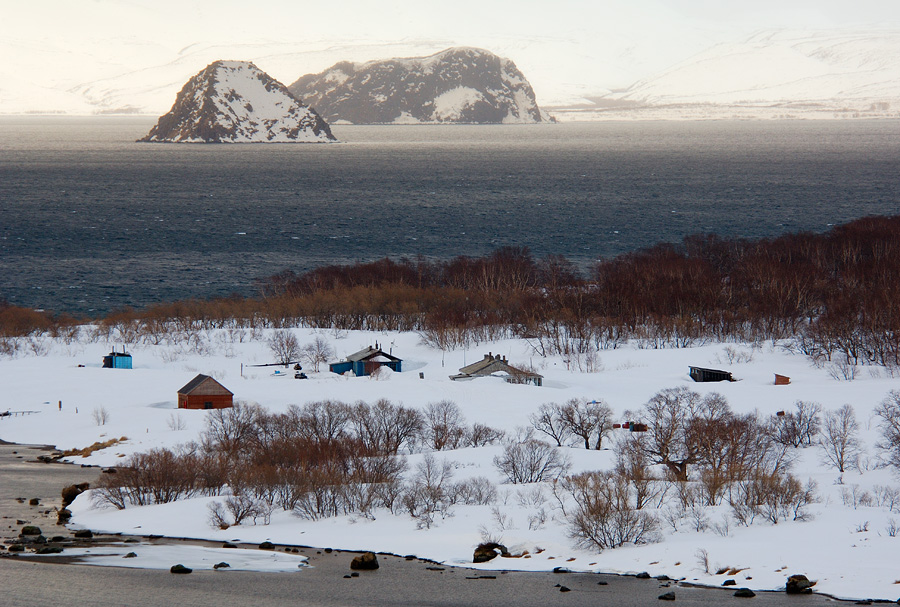
- Kurile lake and the Serdce Alaida island
- Interactive map of Kurile Lake
- Location: Eastern Range, Kamchatka Krai, Russia
- Coordinates: 51°27′N 157°07′E
- Primary outflows: Ozernaya
- Catchment area: 392 km^{2} (151 sq mi)
- Max. length: 14 km (8.7 mi)
- Max. width: 8 km (5.0 mi)
- Surface area: 76 km^{2} (29 sq mi)
- Average depth: 195 m (640 ft)
- Max. depth: 316 m (1,037 ft)
- Water volume: 14.82 km^{3} (3.56 cu mi)
- Surface elevation: 81 m (266 ft)
- Frozen: March-April, rare in cold winter
- Islands: 5
- Settlements: none

Kurile Lake (Russian: Кури́льское о́зеро, romanized: Kuríl'skoye Ózero) is a caldera and crater lake in Kamchatka, Russia. It is also known as Kurilskoye Lake or Kuril Lake. It is part of the Eastern Volcanic Zone of Kamchatka which, together with the Sredinny Range, forms one of the volcanic belts of Kamchatka. These volcanoes form from the subduction of the Pacific Plate beneath the Okhotsk Plate and the Asian Plate.

Before the Kurile Lake caldera formed, the Pauzhetka caldera was active during the Pleistocene, and was the origin of the Golygin ignimbrite at 443,000 ± 8,000 years old. The Kurile Lake caldera erupted 41,500 years ago, and another small eruption occurred between 9,000 and 10,000 years ago; then in 6460–6414 BCE, a very large eruption took place, forming the present-day caldera and the Kurile Lake ignimbrite and depositing ash as far as 1,700 kilometres (1,100 mi) away. This eruption has a volume of 140–170 cubic kilometres (34–41 cu mi), making it a VEI-7-class eruption and one of the largest during the Holocene. Subsequently, the volcanoes Diky Greben and Ilinsky grew around the caldera; as of 2024, the most recent eruption from Ilinsky was in 1911. The caldera is filled by a lake with an area of 76 square kilometres (29 sq mi), and a maximum depth of 316 metres (1,037 ft). The largest sockeye salmon stocks in Asia live in the lake.

== Geography and structure ==
Kurile Lake is found in the southern part of the Kamchatka Peninsula, in a rugged volcanic landscape. The region was not always part of the Kamchatka Peninsula; during the middle Pleistocene, it was an island. Georg Wilhelm Steller visited the area in 1740–1743.

Kurile Lake is formed by two basins, which are separated by a 150-metre-wide (490 ft) subaqueous ridge. The center part of the lake is formed by a flat basin; canyons cut into the slopes of the western side of the lake, where the Ozernaya and Kumnynk rivers open into the lake. The Etamynk and Khakytsin rivers conversely have formed an alluvial fan. The maximum depth of the lake is 316 metres (1,037 ft), with an average depth of 195 metres (640 ft) or 180 metres (590 ft). Since the surface elevation is 81 metres (266 ft), this lake hosts a cryptodepression of 235 metres (771 ft).

The southern basin is deeper than the northern basin (300 metres (980 ft) against the 200 metres (660 ft) of the northern basin) and is a Holocene caldera. The nature of the northern basin is less clear; Bondarenko in 1991 supposed that it was an older, separate caldera which he named Ilinsky, but Braitseva et al. 1997 and Ponomareva et al. 2004 consider both to be the Kurile Lake caldera. This caldera has an area of about 45 square kilometres (17 sq mi), or 14 by 8 kilometres (8.7 mi × 5.0 mi). In that case, the ridge that separates the two basins may be a deposit left when earthquakes preceding the caldera-forming eruption caused Ilinsky volcano to collapse. The caldera collapse was controlled by faults that parallel the lake shores. Some islands in the lake formed by slumping and others are volcanic cones; the “Heart of Alaid” (Serdtze Alaida) is a lava dome 300 metres (980 ft) high. A number of lava domes and pyroclastic cones are found in the lake. The Severnaya bay may be an explosion crater. Lava flows from Ilinsky extend into the lake.

Ring faults, partially buried by alluvial fans and landslides, limit the caldera in the lake. A large landslide forms Glinyany Peninsula in the southeastern shore of the lake. Post-caldera activity has formed some islands in the lake and the Diky Greben volcano. Both Glinyany Peninsula and the post-caldera lava domes (Chayachii, Serdtze Alaida, Tugumynk) were affected by slumping. Approximately 120–160 metres (390–520 ft) of sediment and volcanites bury the deposits left in the caldera by the caldera-forming eruption.

The rim of the Kurile Lake caldera is best expressed at Ilinsky volcano and south and northwest thereof. Close to the lake, two Pleistocene caldera rims can be found and there may be more. The volcanoes Diky Greben, Ilinsky, Kambalny, Kosheleva, and Zheltovsky surround Kurile Lake. Diky Greben formed after the eruption of Kurile Lake.

Gravimetry indicates that there is still a magma chamber beneath Kurile Lake at a depth of about 4 kilometres (2.5 mi). This magma chamber is about 10 kilometres (6.2 mi) wide.

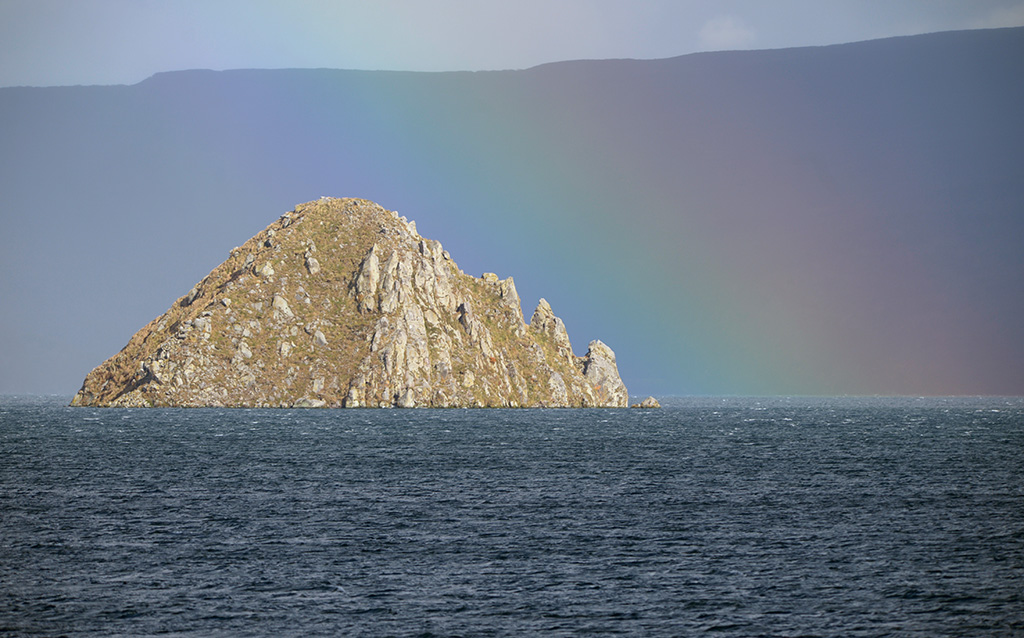
Serdce Alaida

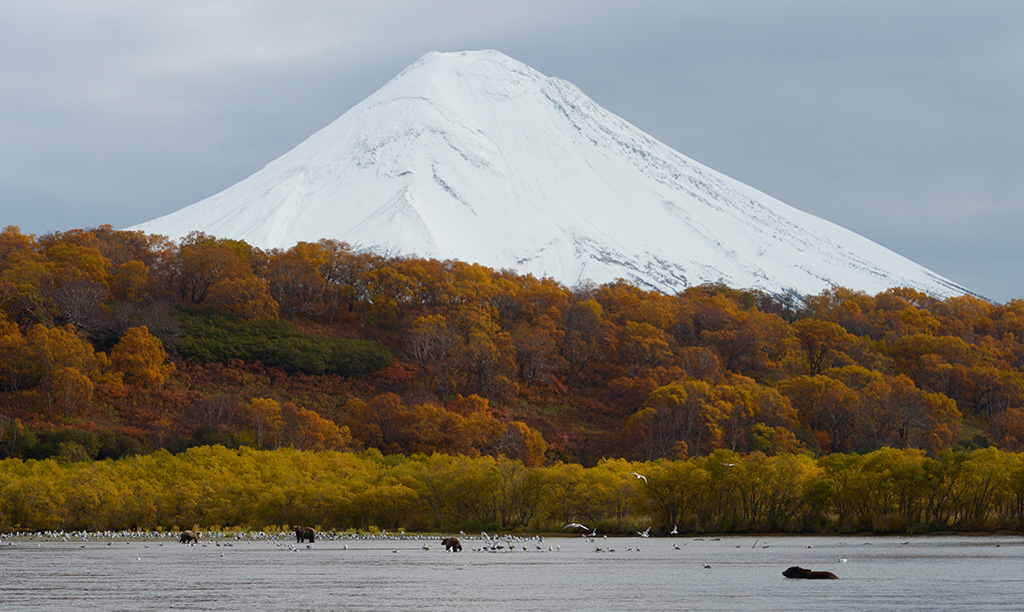
Ilinsky volcano

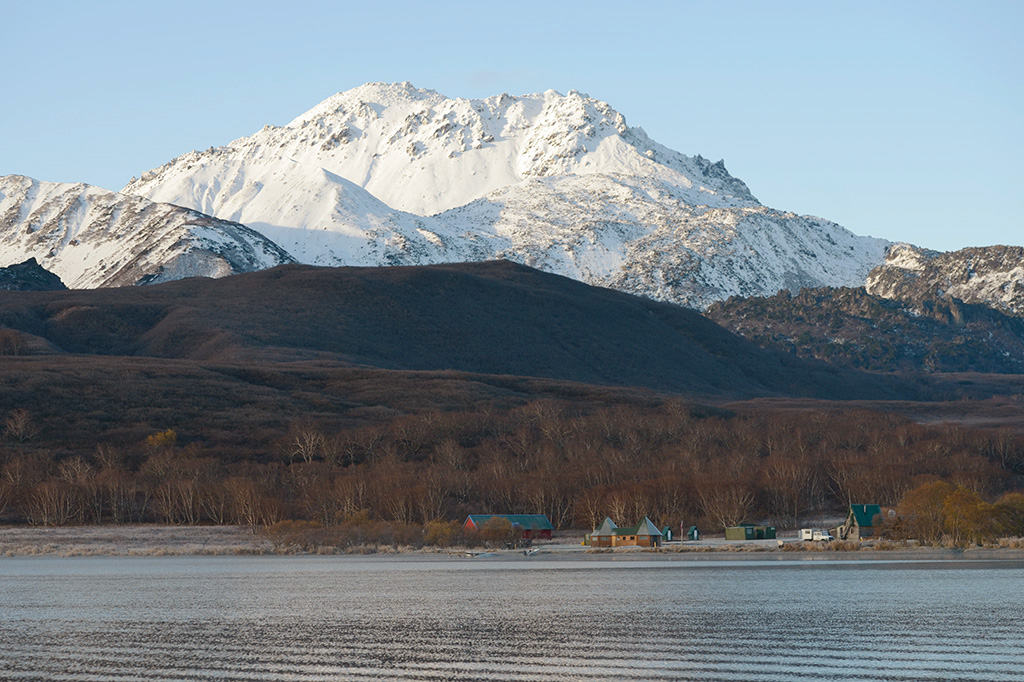
Diky Greben

== Geology ==
The Pacific Plate subducts at a pace of about 8 centimetres per year (3.1 in/year) beneath the Okhotsk Plate and Asian Plate. This subduction is responsible for the Kamchatka-Kuril Trench as well as for volcanism in Kamchatka. The Wadati-Benioff Zone lies about 100 kilometres (62 mi) beneath Kurile Lake and there is a slab window under the volcano that might be responsible for its activity.

Kurile Lake is included in the Eastern Volcanic Zone of Kamchatka, 200 kilometres (120 mi) away from the trench. It is one of the two or three volcanic zones of Kamchatka, the other ones being the Central Depression and the Sredinny Range. Only the first two have had historical activity. The neighbouring volcano Ilinsky was active in 1911, and Zheltovsky was active in 1923. Hydrothermal activity may still be ongoing in the lake.

The oldest volcanoes of the Pauzhetka structure may be of Oligocene-Miocene age; during that time, the area was in the sea. The sedimentary Paratunka Formation and the Kurilsky complex were deposited during that time; they are exposed east and southwest of Kurile Lake. About 600–650 cubic kilometres (140–160 cu mi) of basaltic rocks were erupted during the Miocene-Pliocene. The Pauzhetka depression formed during the Pliocene or Pleistocene and was most likely accompanied by the eruption of the 300–450-cubic-kilometre (72–108 cu mi) Golygino ignimbrite. The eruption of this ignimbrite occurred 443,000 ± 8000 years ago. Afterwards, a resurgent dome named the Kambalny ridge formed in the Pauzhetka structure, as well as a proto-Ilinsky volcano.

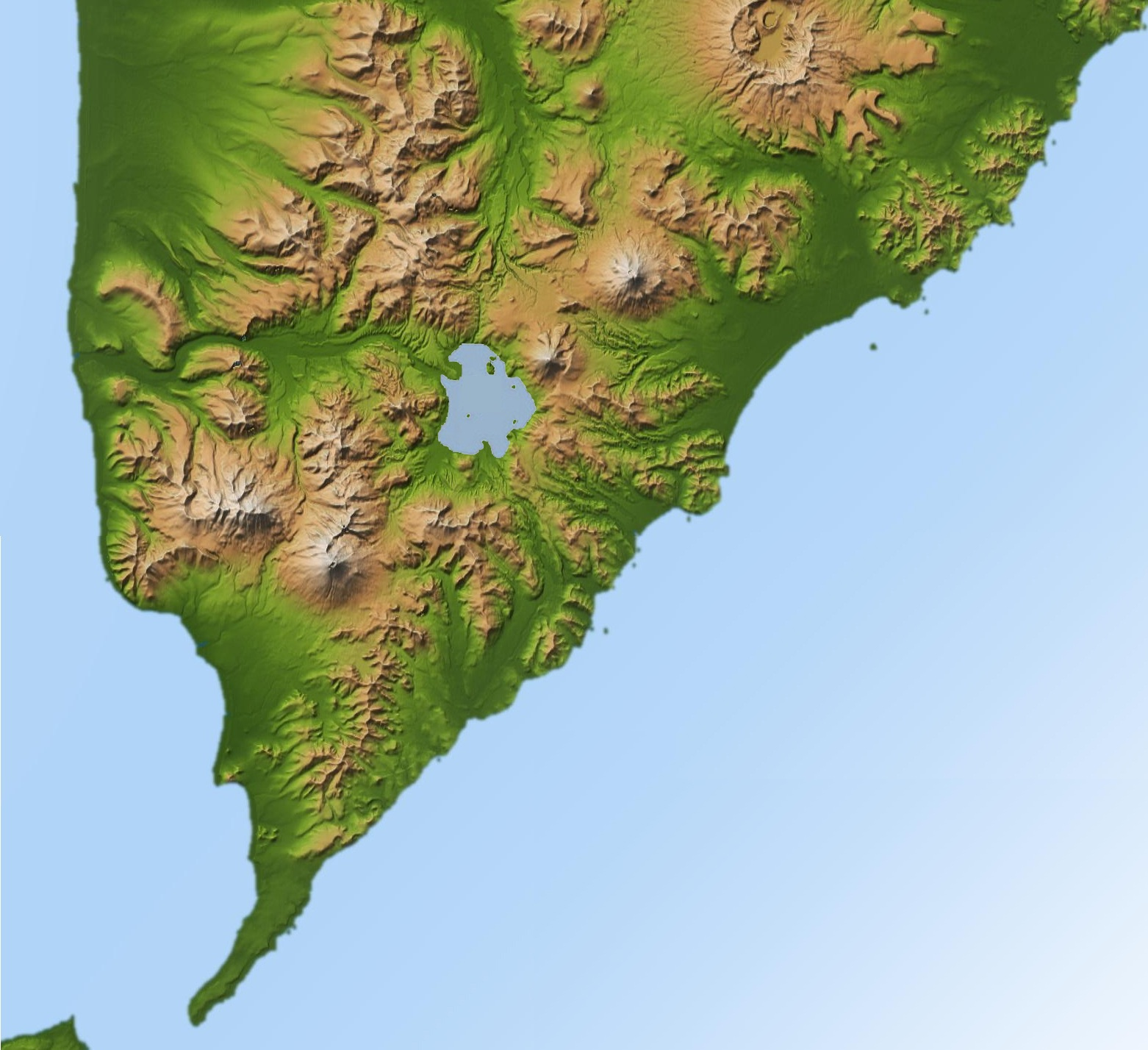
Position of Kurile Lake in southern Kamchatka

=== Local ===
The basement in the area is formed by Miocene-Pliocene sedimentary rocks and volcanic rocks. During the Pleistocene, calderas, lava plateaus, and somma volcanoes like pre-Ilinsky stratovolcanoes formed in the area.

One caldera that formed in the area is the Pauzhetka Caldera, of middle Pleistocene age. As of 2004, the possibility that a later caldera existed in the Pauzhetka caldera was considered. Kurile Lake is located in the eastern part of this Pauzhetka caldera, which has dimensions of 55 by 35 kilometres (34 mi × 22 mi). In the center of the Pauzhetka caldera lies a 650-metre (2,130 ft)-wide depression that covers an area of 25 by 20 kilometres (16 mi × 12 mi).

=== Regional explosive activity ===
Southern Kamchatka has been the site of explosive eruptions during history; the Ksudach volcano 50 kilometres (31 mi) north of Kurile Lake had five caldera forming eruptions during the Pleistocene and Holocene. The time period between 6400 and 6600 BCE was especially active, with caldera-forming eruptions including the one that formed Kurile Lake.

Kurile Lake is not the only volcano in Kamchatka with major explosive eruptions during the Holocene that exceeded VEI 5; three other such eruptions occurred at Ksudach volcano and one at Karymsky volcano.

=== Composition ===
Volcanic rocks of Kurile Lake range from basaltic andesite to rhyolite. They contain small-to-medium amounts of potassium.

Rhyolite makes up the bulk of the eruption products of Kurile Lake. Minerals contained include plagioclase, orthopyroxene, clinopyroxene, magnetite, and hornblende, in decreasing order of importance. The ash becomes white away from the vent, while near-vent deposits are often yellow.

== Environment ==
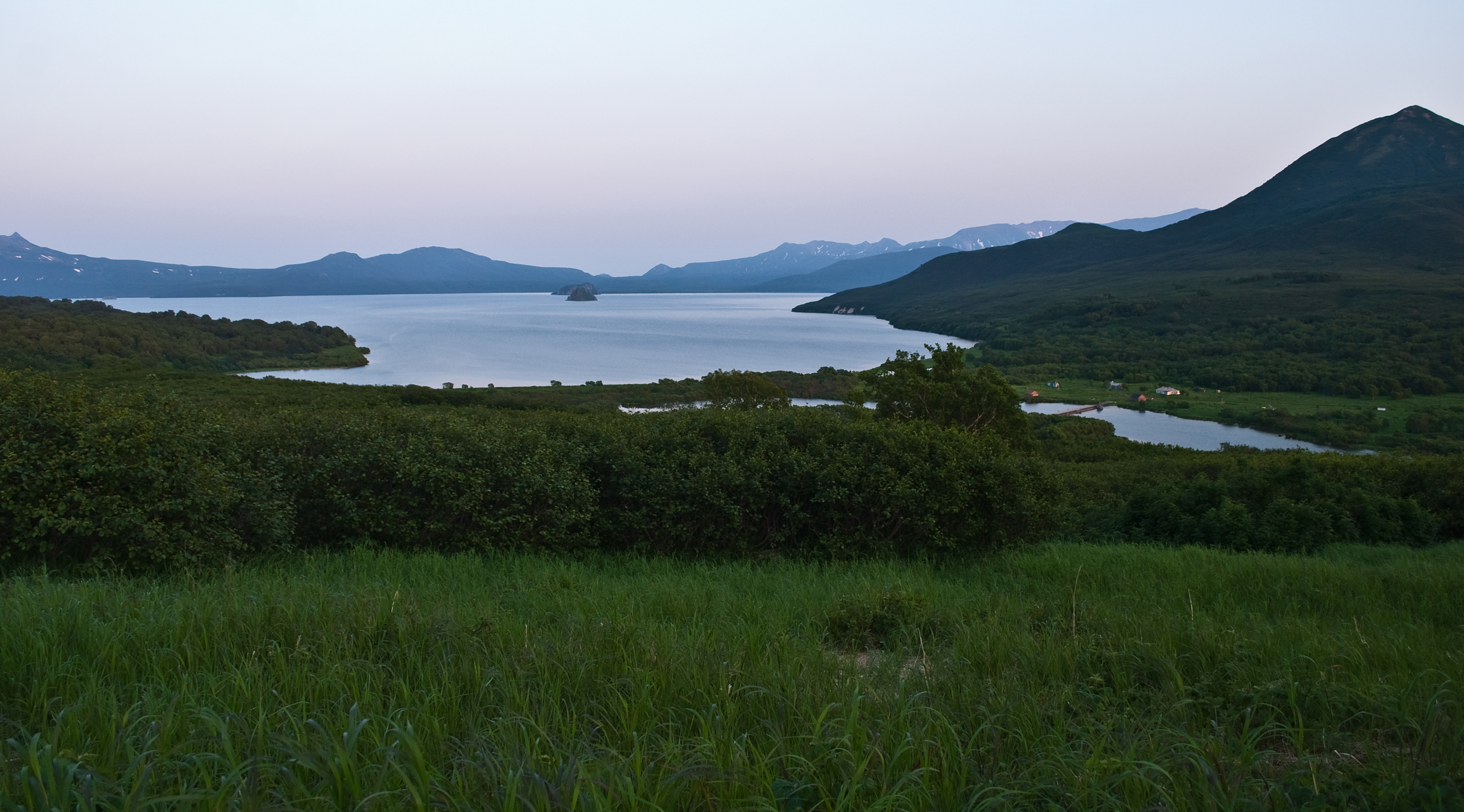
The environment at Kurile Lake

Vegetation around the caldera consists mostly of bush and forest. At the edge of the lake there is no macrovegetation.

Vegetation in Kamchatka overall consists mostly of alder bushes, pine, and stone birch. Along valleys, cottonwood and willow can be found as well. In 1998, Kurile Lake had the highest density of brown bears of Kamchatka, and possibly of the entirety of Russia. The lake is a nature reserve.

=== Lake ===
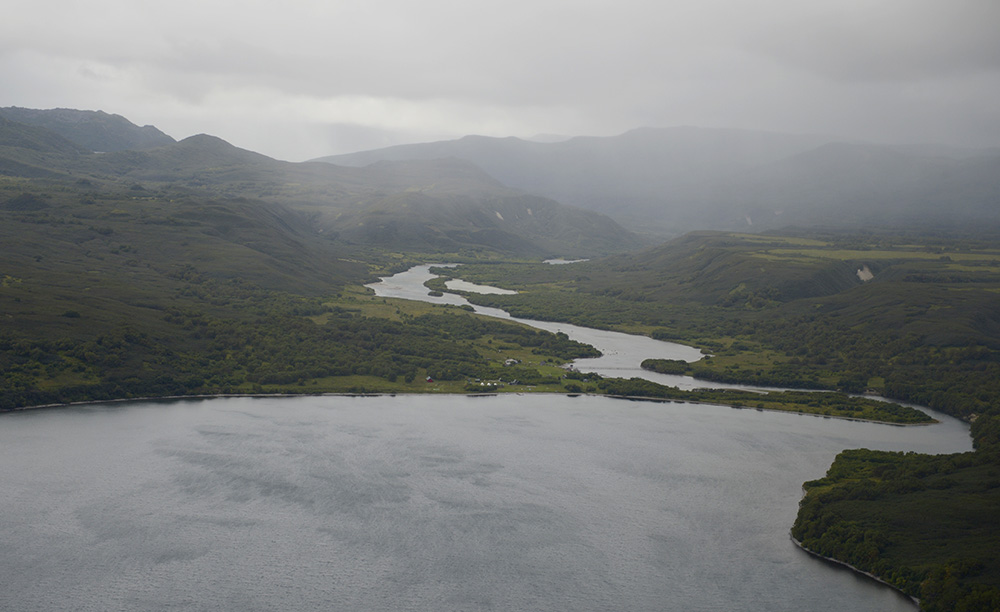
The Ozernaya river drains the lake.

The Kurile Lake caldera is filled by the Kurile crater lake, covering a surface area of 76 square kilometres (29 sq mi) to 77.1 square kilometres (29.8 sq mi). A lake existed already before the Kurile Lake caldera-forming eruption. The present-day lake has a volume of 14.6 cubic kilometres (3.5 cu mi) and a catchment of 392 square kilometres (151 sq mi) and is surrounded by steep shores. Water remains in the lake for about eighteen years.

In June 2011, a water temperature of 1.9 °C (35.4 °F) was measured. The lake waters are oligotrophic. The Ozernaya River drains the lake to the Sea of Okhotsk. Reports in 1923 indicate that the lake was formerly up to 50 metres (160 ft) higher than today, possibly because lava flows dammed its outlet. At least two other shorelines are found 15–20 metres (49–66 ft) above the current water level. The caldera lake may have suffered a catastrophic outburst flood in the past.

Diatoms form most of the phytoplankton, with Cyclotella, Melosira, Stephanodiskus, and Synedra. Dominant copepod species in summer 2011 include Cyclops scutifer and the dominant cladocerans Daphnia longiremis. Other species as well as rotifers are also present; they constitute sources of food for sockeye salmons. A number of annelid species are also found, many of the species that are found in neighboring waters cannot be found in the lake. The chironomid midge Chaetocladius tatianae is endemic to the Kurile Lake watershed.

Sockeye salmon fisheries are present at the lake. The lake is a major nursery for this species of fish. The number of fish in the lake ranges from 260,000 to over 6 million. The stocks found at Kurile Lake are the largest in Asia. Fishing of the salmon of the Ozernaya River has been regulated to allow their reproduction and to conserve bear populations. The lake is part of the Kamchatka National Reserve.

== Eruptive history ==
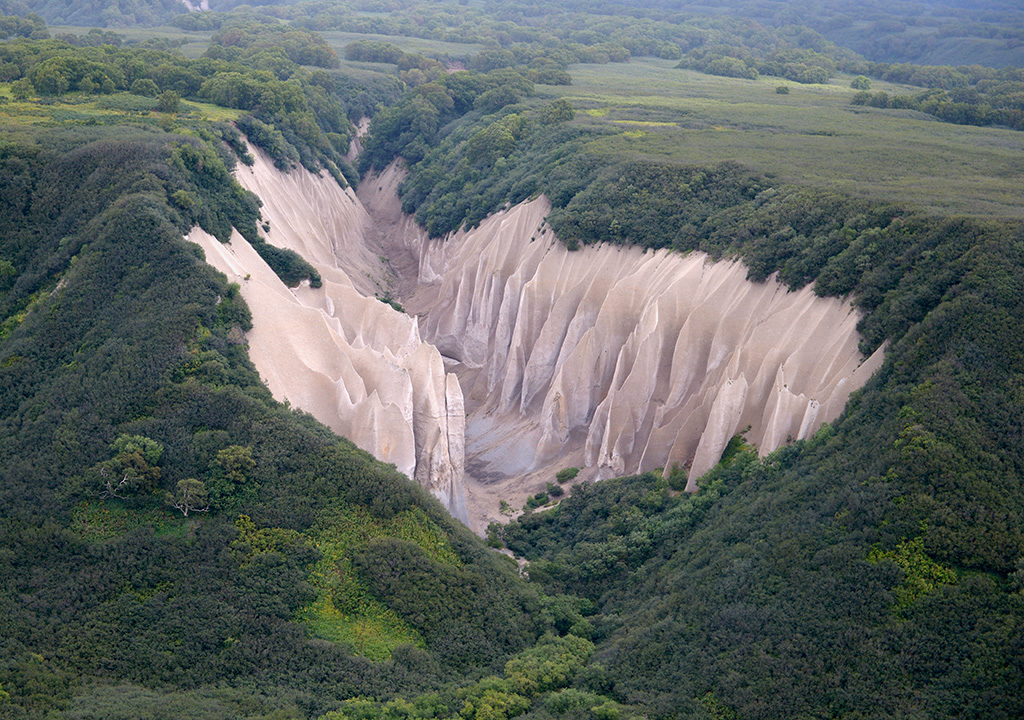
Outcrop of pumice at Kuthiny Baty, 4 km (2.5 miles) from the lake

The idea that pumice around Kurile Lake was formed by an eruption in the area of the lake was first suggested by Boris Piip in 1947. Later research identified this pumice as the product of the caldera-forming eruption, although some skepticism remains, which considers this pumice as the product of fissure eruptions. An earlier Pleistocene caldera-forming eruption took place 41,500 years ago; ash deposits from this eruption are found as far away as Magadan, 1,000 kilometres (620 mi) away from Kurile Lake, and possibly Lake El′gygytgyn.

The Kurile Lake caldera forming eruption, also known as "KO", occurred in 6460–6414 BCE. It is the largest known Holocene eruption in Kamchatka. Tephra from this eruption has been found in southern Kamchatka and also Magadan in Asia. The total volume of the Kurile Lake caldera forming eruption is about 140–170 cubic kilometres (34–41 cu mi), corresponding to a volcanic explosivity index of 7 and comparable to the 1815 eruption of Tambora. Other volcanoes with such large eruptions during the Holocene include Baitoushan, Crater Lake and Kikai.

The caldera forming eruption commenced with a phreatoplinian eruption that generated deposits of fine ash. Several yellowish rhyolitic ignimbrites were erupted, reaching a thickness of over 50 metres (160 ft). These ignimbrites filled gullies around the lake and also reach thicknesses of several tens of centimeters in the Vychenkiya River and Unkanovich River valleys. This eruption phase occurred through the lake. All these deposits were formed by the same event. Subsequently, a short eruption of lapilli and pumice consisting of dacite and rhyolite occurred, most of it falling towards the northwest; their thickness reaches 20 centimetres (7.9 in) north of the lake. Some basaltic scoria was also deposited during this phase. At this point, the vent had emerged above the water level and was generating an eruption column that deposited ash over southern Kamchatka. Eventually, the vent widened and caused the eruption column to collapse. At this point, pyroclastic flows formed and deposited the Kurile Lake ignimbrite. Reaching a thickness of 150 metres (490 ft) close to the lake, it filled valleys, overran plateaus and ridges, and reached both the Pacific Ocean and the Sea of Okhotsk. The ignimbrite was highly mobile, overrunning high topographic obstacles and flowing along valleys in a complex flow pattern. The ignimbrite covered a total surface area of 1,800–1,900 square kilometres (690–730 sq mi). This ignimbrite consists of rocks ranging from basaltic andesite to rhyolite with colors ranging from white to dark. Unusually for such mixed-composition ignimbrites, the rhyolites overlie the more mafic deposits. These mafic ignimbrites are not found around the entire lake, indicating that the magma chamber was asymmetric or its contents were erupted in an asymmetric fashion. The ignimbrite contains remnants of vegetation, accretionary structures formed when the ignimbrite interacted with water, and breccia probably formed when conditions at the vent changed, involving the formation of a ring vent. Fumaroles formed as the ignimbrite overran rivers. Some post-eruption alteration of the ignimbrite deposits also took place. In the lake itself, the ignimbrite is about 400 metres (1,300 ft) thick. The pumice deposits have been affected by erosion and possibly by fumarolic activity, forming structures resembling overturned boats that were named “Khutk's boats” by native settlers.

Ash from the eruption spread west-northwest of Kurile Lake, covering a total surface of over 2,000,000 square kilometres (770,000 sq mi). It can be found at large distances from the caldera; 1-millimetre-thick (0.04 in) layers have been found in the upper reaches of the Indigirka River, 1,700 kilometres (1,100 mi) away from Kurile Lake, and in the Oymyakon Plateau. Thicknesses still reach several centimeters in Magadan. In the northern Kuriles, the thickness reaches several tens of centimeters. This ash is found in drilling cores in the Sea of Okhotsk. Coignimbrite ash formed when the ignimbrites reached the sea. In terms of composition, it ranges from rhyolite to dacite and is poor in potassium. The ash is an important tephrochronological marker and has been found as far away as Greenland.

Before the eruption, a 1,500-year lull in volcanic activity allowed the deposition of soils in the area. A minor eruption occurred at Kurile Lake between 9,000 and 10,000 years ago, resulting in the deposition of tephra north of the caldera. This tephra is formed by gray fine ash and lapilli consisting of dacitic pumice. Other volcanoes also left several tephra deposits. Soils formed after the caldera forming eruptions also contain a number of ash layers by volcanoes both near and far. Volcanic activity occurred at Ilinsky volcano after the caldera forming eruption until 1901, and the similarity between Ilinsky and Kurile Lake rocks indicate that the activities of the two centers are related. Diky Greben formed less than 100 years after the formation of the caldera and was last active 1600 BP. A number of other lava domes and pyroclastic cones formed inside the caldera shortly after the caldera-forming eruption.

=== Effects and threats ===
The caldera-forming eruption of Kurile Lake had a devastating effect on the surrounding area and had a noticeable effect far from the lake. A significant amount of gas was released during the eruption, including 3.7–4.2 billion metric tons of water, 43–49 million tons of chlorine, 8.6–9.8 million tons of fluorine, and 26–29 million tons of sulfur, comparable to the amounts released by Tambora in 1815 and by Huaynaputina in 1600. Two sulfate spikes identified in the GISP2 ice core of Greenland around 6470 and 6476 BC may be linked to the Kurile Lake eruption. The Kurile Lake eruption may have influenced the global climate.

The eruption devastated the vegetation in southern Kamchatka, causing an ecological catastrophe. Close to Kurile Lake, all vegetation would have been wiped out, and deposits left by the eruption would have hampered the revegetation as well. In more favorable terrain where the volcanic deposits were quickly removed, some plants like Alnus fruticosa did survive and quickly resettled the terrain.

== See also ==
- List of volcanoes in Russia
