= The Young Americans =

Non-profit organization and performing group based in Southern California

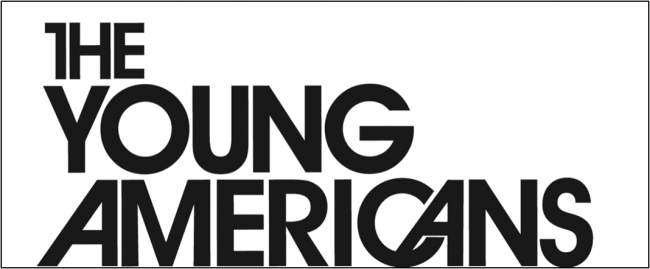
- Logo

Background information
- Origin: California, United States
- Genres: Broadway, Pop, Dance
- Years active: 1962–Present
- Website: www.youngamericans.org

The Young Americans is a non-profit organization and performing group based in Southern California. First founded in 1962 by Milton C. Anderson, the group was credited with being the first show choir in America, mixing choreography with choral singing. While experiencing national television exposure early on, The Young Americans later taught music to students in the United States and other parts of the world as advocates of music education in their International Music Outreach Tours. The group currently has approximately 50 active members between the ages of 18 and 28 from the United States and other countries.

== History ==
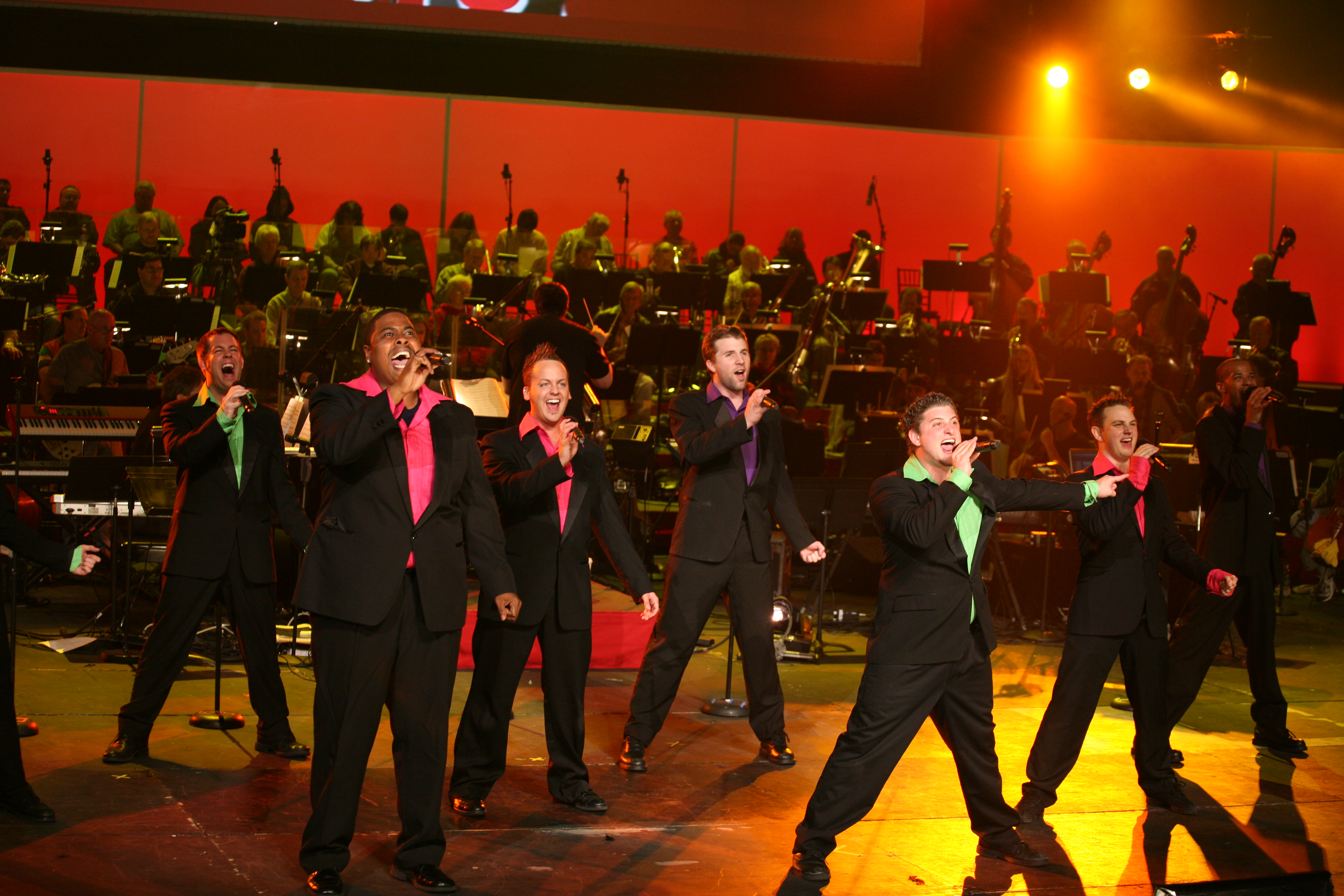
Members of The Young Americans performing in 2007

=== 1960s ===
The Young Americans first appeared on a Bing Crosby television special in the early 1960s. For the next several years, the group would appear on numerous variety shows, singing and dancing with entertainers such as Julie Andrews, Judy Garland, and Bob Hope.

In 1967, the group was featured in a film, Young Americans, which was awarded the Academy Award for Best Documentary Feature for 1968. In May 1969, the film was disqualified because it had premiered in October 1967, and was therefore ineligible for the 1968 award (and was later awarded to the documentary Journey into Self).

=== 1970s and 1980s ===
Throughout the 1970s, along with television appearances with Julie Andrews, The Ed Sullivan Show, Kraft Music Hall, and their own television special with Lorne Greene, The Young Americans began concert tours in the United States and abroad at venues that included Dorothy Chandler Pavilion, Madison Square Garden, the Hollywood Bowl, and with Liberace in Las Vegas. In 1976, the group performed in an outdoor theatre at the foot of the Washington Monument for the United States Bicentennial celebration. Also, in 1976, The Young Americans performed their first national Broadway tour performing: "The Music Man" and "Oklahoma". The troop toured the US for nine months.

In the 1980s, the group continued to tour internationally. The choir's performances for Liberace in the early eighties were featured in the HBO film Behind the Candelabra, based on the book by Liberace's lover, Scott Thorson. The latter sections of the film highlight the relationship between Liberace and Young Americans alumnus Cary James, Liberace's lover who died of AIDS in 1995. The affair between Liberace and James is depicted as a major source of tension between Thorson and Liberace. During the film, The Young Americans sing "I Belong With You."

=== 1990s ===
The International Music Outreach Tour was established in 1992 with the aim to show the importance of school music programs. During 10-week tours, the group will visit 2 schools per week presenting 3-day performance workshops to 4th-12th (US) grade students (internationally ages 5 – 19) . Now touring 7 times per year, the group regularly travels throughout the United States, as well as overseas in countries such as the United Kingdom, Ireland, Germany, the Netherlands, Sweden, Poland, Russia, Switzerland, Spain, Gibraltar, Ukraine, Japan, Australia, and Latvia.

=== 2000s ===
In addition to teaching on the outreach tours, the group is more recently focusing on the creation of its own college, The Young Americans College of the Performing Arts. In the summer months, a cast of Young Americans resides in Harbor Springs, Michigan to host a dinner theatre at The Highlands at Harbor Springs (a Boyne USA resort), that has been running for over 40 years.

=== 2010s-Present ===
The Young Americans continue to put on their Performing Arts Workshops around the globe. In the early 2010s, The Young Americans introduced their Performing Arts Summer Camp. This 5-day camp experience allows the Young Americans to teach a more in-depth performing arts workshop. These camps have been conducted across the US, as well as internationally.

The Young Americans were closed from March 2020-December 2020 due to COVID-19. In the summer of 2021, The Young Americans were able to reopen with their Dinner Theater at The Highlands at Harbor Springs, Midwest Summer Camp Tour, as well as a new Dinner Theater in Eureka Springs, Arkansas. This new Dinner Theater is produced at Center Stage for Performing Arts in Eureka Springs.

== Conservatory ==
The Young Americans College of the Performing Arts (formerly: California Pacific College of the Performing Arts) was a performing arts conservatory in the Greater Los Angeles Area in the United States. It was affiliated with North Central Michigan College until 2019 and had an enrollment of about 200 students in dance, music, drama and teaching methods who could obtain either a certificate or associates of arts degree. Students were active members of The Young Americans - performing, working, and touring for YA while earning their degree simultaneously. The college struggled following the pandemic, having only a few students at a time. After the 2025 spring semester, the Young Americans College officially closed its doors. The organization intends to focus solely on performance and production post-closure of the college program.

== Alumni ==
The group has many alumni who have successful careers in film, television and theatre including but not limited to:

- Vicki Lawrence (The Carol Burnett Show, Mama's Family)
- Bob Kevoian (The Bob & Tom Show)
- Marc Cherry (executive producer and creator of Desperate Housewives)
- Susan Egan (Belle in Broadway's Beauty and the Beast and voice of Megara in Disney's Hercules)
- Stephanie J. Block (Elphaba in Broadway's Wicked)
- Eden Espinosa (Elphaba in Broadway's Wicked, the title role in Broadway's Brooklyn: The Musical. Maureen in the closing cast of Rent)
- Nia Peeples (TV's Fame, Pretty Little Liars)
- Melissa Hayden (Daytime Emmy winner of Guiding Light)
- Mark L. Walberg (Host of PBS Antiques Roadshow)
- Reggie Bannister (actor, star of the Phantasm films)
- Donovan Tea, baritone for vocal trio The Lettermen (1984–present), formerly lead vocalist for The Young Americans.
- Laura Leighton (actress, Melrose Place, Pretty Little Liars)
- Dr. Joe Ashby (MPUSD principal)
