= Koshelev =

Koshelev (Russian: Кошелев) is a Russian masculine surname, its feminine counterpart is Kosheleva. It may refer to:

- Alexander Koshelev (1806—1883), Russian journalist and state official.
- Georgi Koshelev, Soviet production designer and set decorator
- Leonid Koshelev (born 1979), Russian-Uzbekistani football player
- Nikolay Koshelev (1840–1918), Russian painter
- Semyon Koshelev (born 1996), Kazakhstani ice hockey player
- Sergei Koshelev (born 1987), Russian football player
- Tatiana Kosheleva (born 1988), Russian volleyball player
- Vasile Coșelev (born 1972), Moldovan football player
- Vladimir Koshelev (born 1974), Russian politician

== See also ==
- Koshelev (volcano), a stratovolcano in Russia
