= Nicholas Clapp =

American filmmaker (1936–2025)

- Born: May 1, 1936; Providence, Rhode Island, U.S.
- Died: July 30, 2025 (aged 89); Borrego Springs, California, U.S.
- Education: Brown University; University of Southern California
- Occupations: Filmmaker; author; amateur archaeologist; desert preservationist
- Spouse: Bonnie Loizos
- Children: 2

Nicholas Clapp (May 1, 1936 – July 30, 2025) was an American filmmaker, writer and amateur archaeologist who was called "a modern day Indiana Jones". He received 70 film awards (including Emmys), and several films that he edited received Academy Award nominations. He was a graduate of both Brown University and the University of Southern California film school, and worked for Disney, the National Geographic Society, Columbia Pictures, PBS and the White House.

== Personal life and death ==
Clapp was born on May 1, 1936, in Providence, Rhode Island. He was married to Bonnie Loizos, with whom he had two daughters, Jennifer and Cristina. He died after a stroke on July 30, 2025, at the age of 89.

== Books ==
- The road to Ubar: Finding the Atlantis of the Sands. Boston: Houghton Mifflin Harcourt. 1999. ISBN 978-0-395-95786-8. OCLC 41557131.
- Sheba: Through the Desert in Search of the Legendary Queen. Houghton Mifflin Harcourt. 2001. ISBN 9780547345017.
- Who Killed Chester Pray? A Death Valley Mystery. La Frontera. 2007. ISBN 9780978563424.
- Gold and Silver in the Mojave: Images of a Last Frontier. Sunbelt Publications. 2012. ISBN 9780932653062.
- Old Magic: Lives of the Desert Shamans. Sunbelt Publications. 2015. ISBN 9781941384053.
- Virginia City: To Dance with the Devil. Sunbelt Publications. 2016. ISBN 9781941384152.
- Bodie: Good Times & Bad. Sunbelt Publications. 2017. ISBN 9781941384268.
- The Outlaw's Violin: Or Farewell, Old West. Sunbelt Publications. 2019. ISBN 9781941384497.

== Films ==
- The Yanks Are Coming (1963)
- Let My People Go: The Story of Israel (1965)
- The Undersea World of Jacques Cousteau (2 episodes, 1968)
- The Rise and Fall of the Third Reich (1968 TV Movie)
- Journey to the Outer Limits (1973)
- National Geographic Specials: The Haunted West (1973), The Great Mojave Desert (1975)
- The Incredible Machine (1975)
- The Lost City of Arabia (1996), PBS/NOVA
