= Ice Station Zebra =

1968 film directed by John Sturges

- Theatrical release poster by Howard Terpning
- Directed by: John Sturges
- Screenplay by: Douglas Heyes; Harry Julian Fink; W. R. Burnett
- Based on: Ice Station Zebra (1963 novel) by Alistair MacLean
- Produced by: James C. Pratt; Martin Ransohoff; John Calley
- Starring: Rock Hudson; Ernest Borgnine; Patrick McGoohan; Jim Brown
- Cinematography: Daniel L. Fapp
- Edited by: Ferris Webster
- Music by: Michel Legrand
- Production company: Filmways
- Distributed by: Metro-Goldwyn-Mayer
- Release date: October 23, 1968
- Running time: 149 minutes
- Country: United States
- Language: English
- Budget: $8–10 million
- Box office: $4.6 million (U.S. & Canada)

Ice Station Zebra is a 1968 American spy thriller film directed by John Sturges and starring Rock Hudson, Patrick McGoohan, Ernest Borgnine, and Jim Brown. The screenplay is by Douglas Heyes, Harry Julian Fink, and W. R. Burnett, loosely based on Alistair MacLean's 1963 novel. Both were inspired by real-life events that took place in 1959 (the flight, loss and search for Discoverer 2). The film concerns a United States nuclear submarine that is rushed to the North Pole to rescue the personnel of Ice Station Zebra.

The film was shot in Super Panavision 70 and presented in 70 mm Cinerama in premiere engagements. The original music score is by Michel Legrand.

Ice Station Zebra was released on October 23, 1968, to mixed reviews, and it was not a box office success, earning only $4.6 million over its $8–10 million budget. At the 41st Academy Awards, the film was nominated for Best Cinematography and Best Special Visual Effects.

== Plot ==
A Soviet satellite re-enters the atmosphere and ejects a capsule, which lands approximately 320 mi (510 km) northwest of Station Nord, Greenland, in the Arctic Ocean ice pack. A person approaches, guided by a homing beacon, while a second person secretly watches from nearby.

Commander James Ferraday, captain of the American nuclear attack submarine USS Tigerfish stationed at Holy Loch, Scotland, is ordered by Admiral Garvey to rescue the personnel of a British scientific weather station moving with the ice pack named Drift Ice Station Zebra. This rescue is actually a cover for the real mission.

British intelligence officer Jones and a United States Marine Corps platoon join the Tigerfish while in dock. After setting sail, a Kaman SH-2 Seasprite helicopter delivers Captain Anders, a strict officer who takes command of the Marines, and Boris Vaslov, a Russian defector and spy, who Jones trusts. The submarine sails beneath the thick Arctic pack ice, but is unable to break through with its conning tower. Ferraday orders a torpedo launch to break a hole in the surface. When the inner torpedo hatch is opened, seawater rushes in, flooding the compartment and causing the submarine to nose-dive. The Tigerfish is only saved before reaching crush depth by pumping air into the flooded area. After an investigation, Ferraday discovers that the torpedo tube was sabotaged. Ferraday suspects Vaslov, while Jones suspects Anders, continuing to refuse Ferraday's demand for more information about the mission's true objective.

The Tigerfish rises and breaks through thin ice to the surface. Ferraday, Vaslov, Jones, and the Marine platoon set out for the weather station in a blizzard. On arrival, they find the base almost burned to the ground and the scientists nearly dead from hypothermia. Jones and Vaslov question the survivors about what happened.

Jones reveals to Ferraday that he is looking for an experimental British camera that used an enhanced film developed by the Americans. The Soviets stole the technology and sent it into orbit to photograph locations of American missile silos. The satellite also recorded all the Soviet missile sites. After a malfunction, it crashed near Ice Station Zebra. When Soviet and British agents arrived to recover the film capsule, the scientists were caught in the crossfire; the only way of finding the capsule being a tracking device lost somewhere in the station. Ferraday sends his crew out to search for the capsule. Just as Jones finds the tracking device, he is knocked out by Vaslov, now revealed to be a Soviet double agent and the saboteur. Anders confronts Vaslov and the two men fight before the dazed Jones shoots and kills the American. Vaslov feigns his innocence to Ferraday, who discovers a detonation transmitter for the capsule, which he keeps concealed.

The Tigerfish detects approaching Soviet aircraft. Ferraday lets Vaslov use the tracker to locate the ice-buried capsule. Jumping from their transport planes, Soviet paratroopers land nearby and move in as the Americans work to free the capsule from the ice. Their commander, Colonel Ostrovsky, demands the film, threatening to detonate the capsule's explosive booby trap should the Americans attempt to escape with it. After Ferraday hands over the empty container, a brief firefight occurs when the deception is discovered. In the confusion, Vaslov tries to take the film, but is wounded by Jones. Ferraday orders him to give the film to the Soviets. The canister is sent aloft by weather balloon for recovery by aircraft. Moments before it is taken, Ferraday activates his own detonator, destroying the film and denying either side the locations of the other's missile silos. Ostrovsky concedes that both his and Ferraday's missions are effectively accomplished, and the standoff ends, each side beginning the return to their home countries.

The Tigerfish completes the rescue of the civilians, and sets sail back to Scotland. A teleprinter machine report frames the incident as a successful cooperative "humanitarian mission" between the West and the Soviet Union.

== Cast ==
- Rock Hudson as Cdr. James Ferraday
- Ernest Borgnine as Boris Vaslov
- Patrick McGoohan as David Jones
- Jim Brown as Capt. Leslie Anders
- Tony Bill as Lt. Russell Walker
- Lloyd Nolan as Admiral Garvey
- Alf Kjellin as Col. Ostrovsky
- Gerald S. O'Loughlin as Lt. Cdr. Bob Raeburn
- Ted Hartley as Lt. Jonathan Hansen
- Murray Rose as Lt. George Mills
- Ron Masak as Paul Zabrinczski
- Sherwood Price as Lt. Edgar Hackett
- Lee Stanley as Lt. Mitgang
- Joseph Bernard as Jack Benning
- William O'Connell as Survivor
- John Orchard as Survivor

== Production ==
=== Development ===
The film rights to the 1963 Alistair McLean novel were acquired the following year by producer Martin Ransohoff, who hoped to capitalize on the success of 1961's blockbuster adaptation of a 1957 McLean novel into The Guns of Navarone, Hollywood's #2 grossing picture that year. He expected the film to cost around $5 million. Ransohoff's company, Filmways, had a deal with MGM to provide financing.

Paddy Chayefsky, who had just written The Americanization of Emily for Ransohoff, was hired to write the script.

Navarone stars Gregory Peck and David Niven were initially attached to the film, with Peck as the submarine commander and Niven as the British spy, plus Edmond O'Brien and George Segal in the other key roles. John Sturges was borrowed from The Mirisch Company to direct. Filming was set to begin in April 1965, but scheduling conflicts and United States Department of Defense objections over Paddy Chayefsky's screenplay because they felt it showed "an unfair distortion of military life" that would "damage the reputation of the Navy and its personnel" delayed the start. A new script was commissioned.

In January 1967, MGM announced the film would be one of 13 movies it would make during the next year.

=== Casting ===
Scheduling conflicts caused the original cast to be unavailable when filming began in the spring of 1967. Rock Hudson had replaced Gregory Peck by February. After making four flop comedies in a row, Hudson had been keen to change his image; he had just made Seconds and Tobruk, and Ice Station Zebra was an attempt to continue this. According to his publicist, Hudson personally lobbied for the starring role in this film which "revitalized" his career. In June 1967, Laurence Harvey and Patrick McGoohan joined the cast as the Russian agent and British agent, respectively. In July, Ernest Borgnine replaced Harvey. Other key roles were played by Jim Brown and Tony Bill, who signed a five-picture contract with Ransohoff.

There were no women in the cast. "It was the way Maclean wrote it," said Hudson.

=== Filming ===
Filming began in June 1967 using Metrocolor film stock. The film was budgeted at $8 million. Principal photography lasted 19 weeks, ending in October 1967. By the time it was finished the cost had risen to $10 million.

Ice Station Zebra was photographed in Super Panavision 70 by Daniel L. Fapp. The fictional nuclear-powered submarine Tigerfish (SSN-509) was portrayed in the movie by the Diesel-electric Guppy IIA class submarine USS Ronquil (SS-396) when seen on the surface. For submerging and surfacing scenes, the Diesel-electric Guppy IA USS Blackfin (SS-322) was used, near Pearl Harbor. The underwater scenes used a model of a Skate-class nuclear submarine. George Davis, head of the art department at MGM, spent two years researching interior designs for the submarine.

Second unit cameraman John M. Stephens developed an innovative underwater camera system that successfully filmed the first continuous dive of a submarine, which became the subject of a documentary featurette, The Man Who Makes a Difference.

During filming, Patrick McGoohan had to be rescued from a flooded chamber by a diver who freed his trapped foot, saving his life. As he was also making his television series The Prisoner during principal photography on Ice Station Zebra, McGoohan had the episode "Do Not Forsake Me Oh My Darling" re-written to have the mind of his character transferred into the body of another character.

== Release ==
Ice Station Zebra was released in some theaters in the Cinerama format. However, it was not popular with audiences, losing substantial money. It premiered at the Cinerama Dome in Los Angeles on October 23, 1968, where Rock Hudson was heckled at the premiere. The film opened to the general public the following day. The film earned theatrical rentals of $4.6 million domestically.

The escalating production costs of this film, along with the poorly received The Shoes of the Fisherman at the same time, led to the transfer of MGM president Robert O'Brien to chairman of the board, though he resigned that position in early 1969, after both films were released and failed to recoup their costs.

== Reception ==
=== Critical response ===
On Rotten Tomatoes, the film has a 44% rating based on 16 reviews with an average rating of 5.50/10. On Metacritic it has a weighted average score of 49% based on reviews from 9 critics, indicating "mixed or average" reviews.

On December 21, 1968, Renata Adler reviewed the film for The New York Times: "a fairly tight, exciting, Saturday night adventure story that suddenly goes all muddy in its crises ... It doesn't make much difference, though ... The special effects, of deep water, submarine and ice, are convincing enough — a special Super Panavision, Metrocolor, Cinerama claustrophobia ... (The cast) are all stock types, but the absolute end of the movie — when the press version of what happened at a Russian-American polar confrontation goes out to the world — has a solid, non-stock irony that makes this another good, man's action movie, (there are no women in it) to eat popcorn by."

In the March 1969 issue of Harper's Magazine, Robert Kotlowitz wrote: "... a huge production, one of those massive jobs that swallow us alive ... For action it has crash dives, paratroopers, Russian spies, off-course satellites, and a troop of Marines, the average age of whom seems to be fourteen. It also has Rock Hudson ... Patrick McGoohan ... Ernest Borgnine, Jim Brown, and enough others to field maybe three football teams. And best of all, there is also some nice suspense and pacing for at least two-thirds of the movie's three-hour length. It comes apart a bit only when the mystery starts to unravel; but that is the nature of mysteries ..." Kotlowitz's review suggests that seeing the film in theaters equipped for Super Panavision 70 played a significant role in a viewer's experience:

What really got me was the kind of details that the immense, curving Cinerama screen was able to offer... Every single glistening drop of bow spray can be seen as it comes pouring over the submarine's surface, caught by a camera strapped to the conning tower. There are beautiful abstract patterns made by the sub as it cuts its way through the North Sea, all the gleaming, meticulous, finely wrought, intricate machinery inside the sub, and huge chunks of mountainous ice hanging down from the roof of the ice cap like molars. Nothing could distract me from that screen, not even several minutes of confused story-telling at the end of the film... Buy some popcorn and see the movie.

At the time of the film's release Variety's brief review praised it, highlighting the performances: "Film’s biggest acting asset is McGoohan, who gives his scenes that elusive ‘star’ magnetism. He is a most accomplished actor with a three-dimensional presence all his own. Hudson comes across quite well as a man of muted strength. Borgnine's characterization is a nicely restrained one. Brown, isolated by script to a suspicious personality, makes the most of it."

In April 1969, Roger Ebert of the Chicago Sun-Times described it as "so flat and conventional that its three moments of interest are an embarrassment" and called it "a dull, stupid movie". He expressed disappointment that the special effects did not, in his opinion, live up to advance claims, comparing them unfavorably to the effects in 2001: A Space Odyssey. (MGM pulled 2001: A Space Odyssey from Cinerama venues in order to make way for Ice Station Zebra.)

Writing for TCM, Lang Thompson calls the film "a nifty thriller of spies, submarines and saboteurs that captivated no less a personage than Howard Hughes, who reportedly watched it hundreds of times. You certainly won't regret watching it once." Thompson is referring to the fact that "In the era before VCRs, Howard Hughes would call the Las Vegas television station he owned and order them to run a particular movie. Hughes so loved Ice Station Zebra that it aired in Las Vegas over 100 times." Magnetic Video's founder, Andre Blay, later came up with the idea to release motion pictures on videocassette after Hughes' death of kidney failure on April 5, 1976.

In the September/October 1996 issue of Film Comment, director John Carpenter contributed to the magazine's long-running Guilty Pleasures feature. He included Ice Station Zebra on his list, asking "Why do I love this movie so much?"

=== Awards and nominations ===
Award	Date of ceremony	Category	Nominee(s)	Result	Ref.
Academy Award	April 14, 1969	Best Cinematography	Daniel L. Fapp	Nominated	
Academy Award	April 14, 1969	Best Special Visual Effects	Hal Millar, Joseph McMillan Johnson	Nominated	

== Legacy ==
Ice Station Zebra is mentioned several times in the television show Better Call Saul as a favorite film of the show's protagonist, Jimmy McGill (later Saul Goodman). Furthermore, the name of his LLC is "Ice Station Zebra Associates."

Howard Hughes' devotion to the film is legendary: During his reclusive years living in the top floor of the Desert Inn (which was owned by Howard Hughes from 1967 to 1988) in Las Vegas, Hughes developed an intense fascination with the film. Dissatisfied with the programming on the local television station KLAS-TV (which was owned by Hughes Tool Company from 1968 to 1978), he purchased the station so he could order Ice Station Zebra to be aired repeatedly. According to singer Paul Anka, "You'd get back to your room, turn on the TV at 2 a.m., and the movie Ice Station Zebra would be playing. At 5 a.m., it would start all over again. It was on almost every night."

== See also ==
- List of American films of 1968

== Notes ==
Bibliography

- Suid, Lawrence H. (1996). Sailing the Silver Screen: Hollywood and the U.S. Navy. Annapolis, MD: Naval Institute Press. ISBN 1-55750-787-2.
