= Young Americans College of the Performing Arts =

Coordinates: 33.858861°N 117.542472°W

The Young Americans College of the Performing Arts
- (United States) Corona, CA

Information
- Type: College
- Established: 2002
- Closed: 2025
- Website: yacollege.edu

The Young Americans College of the Performing Arts (YACPA; formerly: California Pacific College of the Performing Arts) was a performing arts conservatory in the city of Corona, CA, which is in the Greater Los Angeles Area in the United States. In 2025, the organization announced that it would close after the end of the spring semester due to accreditation difficulties.

== History ==
The school emerged from the performing group The Young Americans, which is closely affiliated. The college was formerly known as California Pacific College of the Performing Arts until it was renamed in 2010.

== Enrollment ==
1n 2023, enrollment in YCPA was 31 undergraduate students. The student-to-faculty ratio was 4 to 1.

== Admissions ==
Before a student was considered for admission into the college program, they must have first auditioned and been accepted into The Young Americans. The school's acceptance rate was 50%.

== Auditions ==
Auditions were held for high school juniors, seniors, and graduates.

== Additional Admission Requirements ==
High School Completion & GPA: Before an accepted student could enroll, they must have demonstrated high school completion with a GPA of 2.0 or higher. Students who did not meet the minimum GPA may have been admitted on a conditional status, but were required to achieve a 2.0 GPA for their first semester of instruction if they wished to continue enrollment in the future.

Student Health: Given the physical demands of The Young Americans prior to admission, all students were required to submit a report from a licensed physician attesting to their physical ability to withstand prolonged and rigorous physical activity.

SAT and ACT scores were neither required nor recommended.

== Associate of Arts in Performance ==
The Associate of Arts in Performance Degree was a two-year program of study. During this course of study, students performed in an average of 40 shows and traveled to four countries.

== See also ==
- Alumni of The Young Americans.
