= Young Americans (1967 film) =

- Directed by: Alexander Grasshoff
- Written by: Alexander Grasshoff
- Produced by: Robert Cohn; Alexander Grasshoff
- Cinematography: Richard Moore
- Distributed by: Columbia Pictures
- Release dates: August 21, 1967 (Premiere); October 1967
- Running time: 104 minutes
- Country: United States
- Language: English

Young Americans is a 1967 American documentary directed by Alexander Grasshoff. It follows the Young Americans choir as they travel and perform across the United States. The film won the Academy Award for Best Documentary Feature in 1969, but the award was later revoked because the film had been released in 1967, making it ineligible. It remains the only documentary to have had its Oscar rescinded (the award was given to runner-up Journey into Self). Actress and singer Vicki Lawrence, later known for The Carol Burnett Show, appears in several musical numbers.

== Overview ==
The documentary profiles The Young Americans, a Los Angeles-based youth show choir made up of high school and college students. Under the leadership of Milton Anderson, the group embodies patriotism and wholesome entertainment. The film follows their audition and rehearsal process as they prepare for a fall tour across the United States by bus. Out of a large pool of hopefuls, only 36 performers—18 males and 18 females—are selected, with Anderson looking for more than just vocal talent. Some of the auditioning students share what being part of the choir means to them.

The tour includes stops in Boston, New York City, a state fair, and even the Illinois State Penitentiary. The documentary captures both their performances and their interactions offstage, highlighting the challenges of traveling with a large group, which includes organizers, chaperones, and crew members. As expected, tensions arise, as the young performers navigate the pressures of the tour and the expectations placed upon them.

== Release ==
The film premiered on August 21, 1967, at the Plaza Theatre in Kansas City as a benefit for the Will Rogers Hospital.

== See also ==
- List of American films of 1967
