= The Jailbreakers =

- Film poster
- Directed by: Alexander Grasshoff
- Written by: Alexander Grasshoff
- Produced by: Alexander Grasshoff
- Starring: Robert Hutton; Mary Castle
- Cinematography: W. Merle Connell
- Music by: André Brummer
- Distributed by: American International Pictures (US)
- Release date: 1960
- Running time: 64 minutes
- Country: United States
- Language: English

The Jailbreakers is a 1960 American film written, produced and directed by Alexander Grasshoff in his debut feature film that was released by American International Pictures as a double feature with Why Must I Die? (1960).

== Cast ==
- Robert Hutton as Tom
- Mary Castle as June
- Michael O'Connell as Lake
- Gabe Delutri as Joe
- Anton von Stralen as Stearn
- Toby Hill as Karen
- Carlos Chávez as Bushman
- Coleman Francis
