= Diky Greben =

Lava dome complex in southern Kamchatka

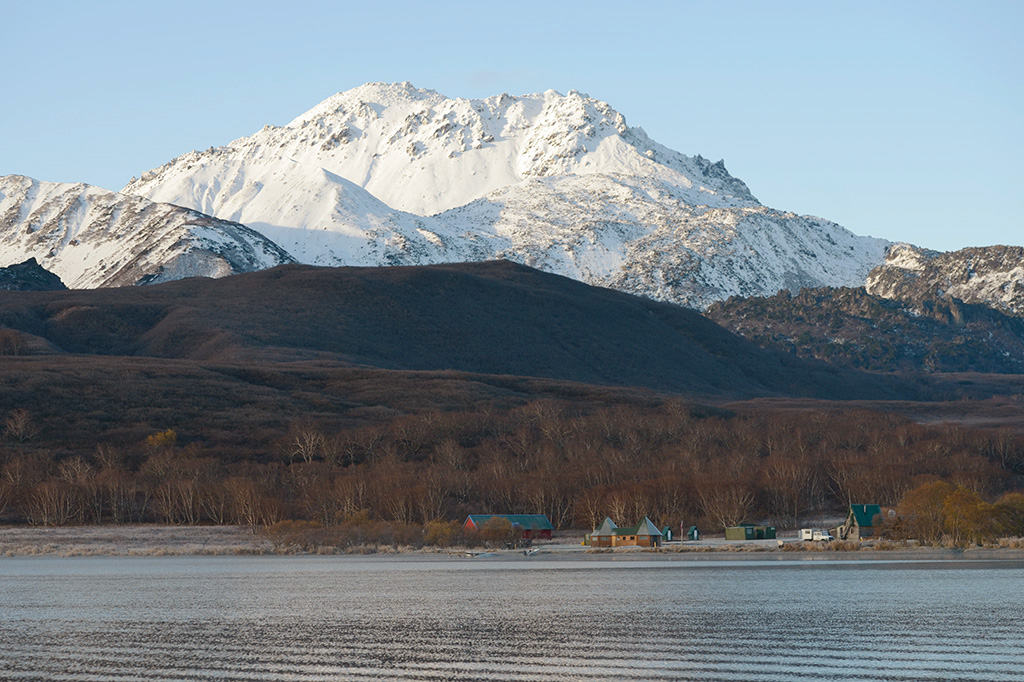
- View of the volcano from the nearby Kurile Lake

Highest point
- Elevation: 1,040 m (3,410 ft)
- Coordinates: 51.45°N 156.97°E

Geography
- Location within Kamchatka Krai
- Location: Kamchatka, Russia
- Parent range: Eastern Range

Geology
- Mountain type: Lava domes
- Last eruption: 350 CE ± 300 years

Diky Greben (Russian: Дикий гребень, lit. 'Wild Ridge') is a lava dome complex located in the southern part of Kamchatka Peninsula, Russia. The Kurile Lake adjoins the volcano in the northeast, and the Ozernaya River skirts it from the north. Several lakes formed on the lava-dammed sections of its slopes.

The volcano is the largest complex of lava domes in Kamchatka, one of the largest in the world. The total volume of all its lava domes is 18 km^{3} (4.3 cu mi). Its highest point is Mount Nepriyatnaya (Russian: Неприятная, lit. 'Unpleasant'), 1,079 m (3,540 ft).

The volcano is showing modern geothermal activity and, presumably, the growth of the central dome, Mount Nepriyatnaya, still continues.

== See also ==
- List of volcanoes in Russia
