= Future Shock (film) =

1972 film

- Directed by: Alex Grasshoff
- Written by: Ken Rosen; Alvin Toffler
- Produced by: Charles W. Fries; Alex Grasshoff
- Narrated by: Orson Welles
- Cinematography: Vilis Lapenieks
- Edited by: David Newhouse
- Music by: Gil Mellé
- Release date: February 22, 1972
- Running time: 43 minutes
- Country: United States
- Language: English

Future Shock is a 1972 American short documentary film directed by Alex Grasshoff and narrated by Orson Welles. It was screened at the 1973 Cannes Film Festival, but it wasn't entered into the main competition. It is based on the 1970 book of the same name by Alvin Toffler.

== Synopsis ==
The film describes future shock as "the premature arrival of the future." Welles describes changes in the cultural mindset such as indecision from overwhelming options, instant gratification, disposable products and impermanence. Additional topics include:

- Samuel Kountz on organ transplantation.
- John Bray on prosthetics.
- Kurt Wagner on plastic surgery.
- William L. Epstein on skin pigmentation.
- William Grey Walter on artificial intelligence.
- The Sim One robotic patient simulator.
- Charles Epstein on genetics.
- Robert Rimmer on polyfidelity, his book Proposition 31, communal living and same-sex marriage.
- James McGaugh on genetic engineering.Additional cultural aspects including x-rated films, women's liberation, equal rights, cryonics, SST technology, nuclear testing and the anti-nuclear movement.

== See also ==
- List of American films of 1972
