= A Way Out of the Wilderness =

1968 film

- Produced by: Dan E. Weisburd
- Production company: John Sutherland Productions
- Distributed by: Rehabilitation Services Administration
- Release date: 1968
- Country: United States
- Language: English

A Way Out of the Wilderness is a 1968 American short documentary film produced by Dan E. Weisburd. It was nominated for an Academy Award for Best Documentary Short. The film was preserved by the Academy Film Archive in 2011.

== See also ==
- List of American films of 1968
