= Ilyinsky (volcano) =

Stratovolcano on the southern part of the Kamchatka peninsula

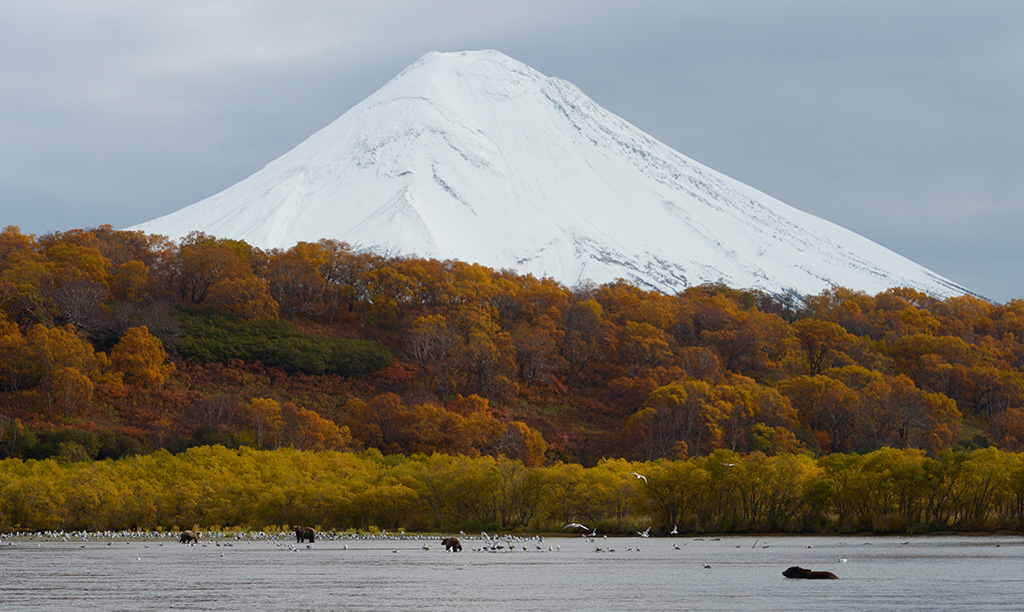
- Ilyinsky

Highest point
- Elevation: 1,555 m (5,102 ft)
- Coordinates: 51.490°N 157.20°E

Geography
- Location within Kamchatka Krai
- Location: Kamchatka, Russia
- Parent range: Eastern Range

Geology
- Mountain type: Stratovolcano
- Last eruption: 1901

Ilyinsky (Russian: Ильинская сопка, Ilyinskaya sopka) is a dormant stratovolcano located in the southern part of the Kamchatka Peninsula, Russia near Kurile Lake.

== See also ==
- List of volcanoes in Russia
