= Journey to the Outer Limits =

1973 film

- Directed by: Alexander Grasshoff
- Written by: Kenneth M. Rosen
- Produced by: Peter S. Brown; Nicholas Clapp; Alexander Grasshoff; Dennis B. Kane
- Narrated by: Leslie Nielsen
- Cinematography: Mike Hoover; David Myers
- Edited by: David Newhouse
- Music by: Billy Goldenberg
- Production company: Wolper Productions
- Distributed by: National Geographic Society
- Release date: 1973
- Running time: 52 minutes
- Country: United States
- Language: English

Journey to the Outer Limits is a 1973 American documentary film directed by Alexander Grasshoff. It was nominated for an Academy Award for Best Documentary Feature.

== See also ==
- List of American films of 1973
