= Ozyornaya (Sea of Okhotsk) =

River draining to Sea of Okhotsk in Russia

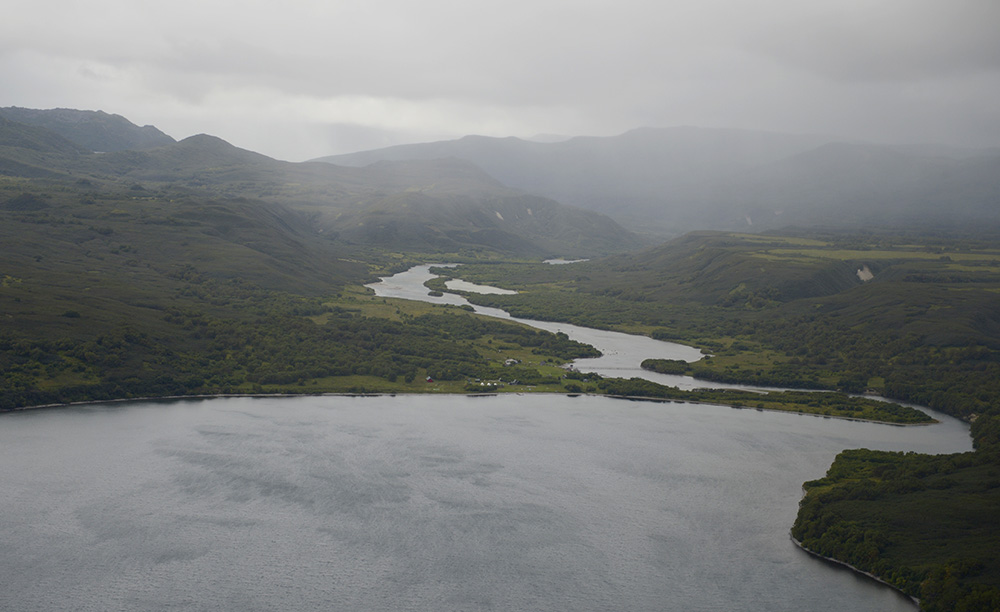
- The source of the river in the Kurile lake
- Native name: Озёрная (Russian), Игдыг (Koryak)

Location
- Country: Russia

Physical characteristics
- Source
  - location: Kurile Lake
  - coordinates: 51°29′09″N 157°02′37″E
  - elevation: 81 m (266 ft)
- Mouth: Sea of Okhotsk
  - coordinates: 51°29′48″N 156°29′31″E
- Length: 48 km (30 mi)
- Basin size: 1,030 km^{2} (400 sq mi)
- Discharge
  - average: 30 m^{3}/s (1,100 cu ft/s)

Ozyornaya (Russian: Озёрная, lit. 'Lake-river') is a river in the Kamchatka Krai of Russia. It originates in Lake Kurile and flows west to the Sea of Okhotsk.

The length of the river is 48 km (30 mi), and the area of the drainage basin is 1,030 km^{2} (400 sq mi). Despite the small area of its basin, the average annual discharge of water near the sea reaches 30 m^{3}/s (1,100 cu ft/s). The significant amount of precipitation in this area ensures an abundant flow of water in the river and is due both to the geographical location near the Pacific Ocean and to the mountainous orography of the basin. The annual amount of precipitation on the Kurile Lake is 1,400 millimetres (55 in); it can significantly exceed this figure in mountainous areas. Precipitation mostly falls in the autumn and mostly in the form of snow in the mountains, which melts in the following summer without forming any noticeable glaciers.

The mountain landscape of the river basin has volcanic origin and called the Pauzhetsky volcano-caldera complex. Kurile Lake and the upper half of the Ozyornaya channel lie within this volcanic region, and the geothermal activity is often manifested here in the form of hot springs. Some of them are named: Ozyornovskiye, Pauzhetsky hot springs, and White waterfalls. The latter is a cluster of cold water springs with a slightly elevated temperature of 4.7°C and has the status of a nature sanctuary.

A distinctive feature of Ozyornaya is the absence of ice cover in winter: the river freezes only in its mouth part. Because the river has a considerable geothermal underground inflow and has a steady, fast current throughout its course, ice does not form during the cold season. The source of the river in the Kurile Lake also plays a role in this, since it provides the inflow of warmer water from the lake deeper layers, thus preventing ice formation in winter. In general, the combination of underground inflow and inflow from the lake leads to a smoothed river regime with high mean water levels in all seasons.

The abundance of geothermal resources in the region is exploited by the Pauzhetskaya geothermal power plant, the oldest geothermal plant in Russia. It is located near the Pauzhetka river, one of its tributaries. The settlements of Ozyornovsky and Zaporozhye are located near the mouth of the Ozyornaya River and are centers of local fishing. There is also a Research Fisheries Center station on the river; it monitors the spawning of salmon and the development of its juveniles.

The specific nature of Ozyornaya is preferable for some fish species. It has the biggest herd of sockeye salmon in the Pacific Asia and therefore has a special status in the Kamchatka-Kuril subzone.

== See also ==
- List of rivers of Russia
- Kamchatka peninsula
