= The Really Big Family =

1966 film by Alexander Grasshoff

- Directed by: Alexander Grasshoff
- Written by: Arthur Bramble; Nicolas Noxon
- Produced by: Sam Farnsworth; Alexander Grasshoff
- Narrated by: Henry Fonda
- Cinematography: Vilis Lapenieks
- Edited by: John Soh
- Production company: David L. Wolper Productions
- Release date: 1966
- Country: United States
- Language: English

The Really Big Family is a 1966 American documentary film directed by Alexander Grasshoff about the Dukes family of Seattle, who had 18 children. It was nominated for an Academy Award for Best Documentary Feature.

== See also ==
- List of American films of 1966
