= Hal Millar =

American special effects artist

- Born: August 10, 1913; Los Angeles, California, U.S.
- Died: August 12, 1991 (aged 78)
- Occupation: Special effects artist
- Years active: 1939–1988

Hal Millar (June 10, 1913 – August 12, 1991) was an American special effects artist. He was nominated for an Academy Award in the category Best Visual Effects for the film Ice Station Zebra.

== Selected filmography ==
- The Wizard of Oz (1939)
- Ice Station Zebra (1968; co-nominated with Joseph McMillan Johnson)
