= Vladimir Uvarov =

Vladimir Uvarov (russian: Владимир Уваров) was a Soviet photographer. He was nominated for an Academy Award for Best Art Direction for his work in the epic film War and Peace (1967).
