= A Few Notes on Our Food Problem =

1968 film directed by James Blue

- Directed by: James Blue
- Produced by: James Blue
- Distributed by: United States Information Agency
- Release date: 1968
- Country: United States
- Language: English

A Few Notes on Our Food Problem is a 1968 American documentary film directed by James Blue. It was nominated for an Academy Award for Best Documentary Feature.

== See also ==
- List of American films of 1968
