= Other Voices (1970 film) =

1970 documentary film

- Theatrical release poster
- Directed by: David H. Sawyer
- Cinematography: Robert Elfstrom
- Edited by: J. Michaels
- Production company: DHS Films
- Distributed by: Dorowite Corporation
- Release date: 1970
- Running time: 100 minutes
- Country: United States
- Language: English

Other Voices is a 1970 American documentary film directed by David H. Sawyer. The film follows Dr. Albert Honig, one of the most controversial doctors of his era, as he demonstrates various techniques he has employed in his treatment of comatose, catatonic, schizophrenic, and autistic patients. It follows Dr. Honig and a handful of patients living in a rural setting in Doylestown, Pennsylvania, during their daily activities, and during treatment sessions with Dr. Honig.

It was nominated for an Academy Award for Best Documentary Feature.

== Cast ==
- Albert Honig
- Sylvia Honig
- Dan Lieberman
- Emil Ondra
- Marnin Soltes
- Mark Cohen
