= Georgi Koshelev =

Soviet production designer and set decorator (1930–1996)

Georgi Georgiyevich Koshelev (Russian: Гео́ргий Гео́ргиевич Ко́шелев) (1930 – 1996) was a Soviet production designer and set decorator. Koshelev has worked as a set decorator at Mosfilm in 1961 – 1986. He was nominated for an Academy Award for Best Art Direction for his work on the epic film War and Peace (1967). After leaving Mosfilm due to illness, he was engaged in painting and iconography, drawing posters for films.
