= Alex Grasshoff =

American filmmaker

- Born: December 10, 1928; Boston, Massachusetts, U.S.
- Died: April 5, 2008 (aged 79); Los Angeles, California, U.S.
- Education: University of Southern California
- Occupations: Filmmaker; director

Alexander Grasshoff (December 10, 1928 – April 5, 2008) was an American documentary filmmaker and director who received three Oscar nominations.

Along with fellow producer Robert Cohn, he is perhaps best known for writing and directing the documentary Young Americans, which won an Academy Award for Best Documentary Feature during the 1969 ceremony. However, the Academy of Motion Picture Arts and Sciences soon found out the film had been shown first in October 1967, thus making it ineligible for a 1968 award and the Oscar was revoked. (This marks the only time, as of 2022, where an Academy Award was first awarded and then revoked.) Grasshoff, who reportedly slept with the Oscar on the first night, also directed Academy Award-nominated films The Really Big Family (1966) and Journey to the Outer Limits (1973). He also directed the award-winning The Wave (1981), based on Ron Jones' The Third Wave experiment, and Future Shock (1972), based on Alvin Toffler's book and hosted by Orson Welles.

== Biography ==
Born in Boston, Massachusetts, Grasshoff earned a bachelor's degree in cinema at the University of Southern California and began his career in the mail room of Paramount in 1951 working up to assistant editor, then editor. He made his directoral debut in a crime film The Jailbreakers released by American International Pictures that Grasshoff also wrote and produced. A home owned by Mr. Grasshoff was rented out to music group the Beastie Boys while they recorded the album Paul's Boutique.

Grasshoff died on April 5, 2008, at his home in Los Angeles of complications from bypass surgery on a leg. He is survived by his wife of 38 years, Madilyn Clark Grasshoff, and two sisters, Yrsa Grasshoff and Edith Rand.

== Filmography ==
=== Director ===
- 1960: The Jailbreakers
- 1963: Hollywood and the Stars (TV series, 1 episode)
- 1965: National Geographic Specials (TV series documentary)
- 1966: Love on a Rooftop (TV series, 1 episode)
- 1966: The Really Big Family (Documentary short)
- 1966: Destination Safety (TV movie documentary)
- 1967: Young Americans (Documentary)
- 1972: Future Shock (Documentary)
- 1972: Wacky Taxi
- 1973: Journey to the Outer Limits (Documentary)
- 1973–74: Toma (TV series, 4 episodes)
- 1974: Crackle of Death (TV movie)
- 1974: Get Christie Love! (TV series)
- 1974: The Rookies (TV series, 1 Episode)
- 1974: The Rockford Files (TV series, 2 episodes)
- 1974: Kolchak: The Night Stalker (TV series, 3 episodes)
- 1975: Movin' On (TV series, 1 episodes)
- 1975-76: Barbary Coast (TV series, 4 episodes)
- 1977: The Last Dinosaur
- 1977: CHiPs (TV series)
- 1978: Smokey and the Good Time Outlaws
- 1981: The Wave (TV movie)
- 1982: Counterattack: Crime in America (Fernsehdokumentation)
- 1982: The Unforgivable Secret (ABC Afterschool Special, TV movie)
- 1982: Sometimes I Don't Love My Mother (ABC Afterschool Special, TV movie)
- 1984: Backwards: The Riddle of Dyslexia (ABC Afterschool Special, TV movie)
- 1984: Billions for Boris
- 1985: I Want to Go Home (ABC Afterschool Special, TV movie)

=== Producer ===
- 1960: The Jailbreakers
- 1963–64: Hollywood and the Stars (TV Series, 3 Episodes)
- 1965: National Geographic Specials (TV Series documentary)
- 1966: The Really Big Family (Documentary short)
- 1967: Young Americans (Documentary)
- 1972: Future Shock (Documentary)
- 1973: Journey to the Outer Limits (Documentary)
- 1978: Smokey and the Good Time Outlaws (co-producer)

=== Writer ===
- 1960: The Jailbreakers
- 1964: Hollywood and the Stars (TV Series, 2 episodes)
- 1967: Young Americans (Documentary)
- 1972: Wacky Taxi

=== Editor ===
- 1961: Magic Spectacles
