= 15th Academy Awards =

- Date: March 4, 1943
- Site: Cocoanut Grove, The Ambassador Hotel, Los Angeles, California, USA
- Hosted by: Bob Hope

Highlights
- Best Picture: Mrs. Miniver
- Most awards: Mrs. Miniver (6)
- Most nominations: Mrs. Miniver (12)

The 15th Academy Awards was held in the Cocoanut Grove at The Ambassador Hotel in Los Angeles on March 4, 1943, honoring the films of 1942. The ceremony is most famous for the speech by Greer Garson. Accepting the award for Best Actress, Garson spoke for approximately 5 minutes and 30 seconds, which was the longest acceptance speech in Oscars history until Adrien Brody won for Best Actor in 2025. A portion of the ceremony was broadcast by CBS Radio.

Mrs. Miniver was the second film (after My Man Godfrey in 1936) to receive nominations in all four acting categories, as well as the first film to receive five acting nominations; it won six of its twelve nominations, including Best Picture and William Wyler's first of three Best Director awards.

Irving Berlin presented the Academy Award for Best Original Song, which he ended up winning himself for "White Christmas". There was also a four-way tie for Best Documentary Feature, a unique occurrence.

== Winners and nominees ==
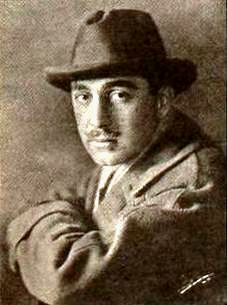
Sidney Franklin, Outstanding Motion Picture winner

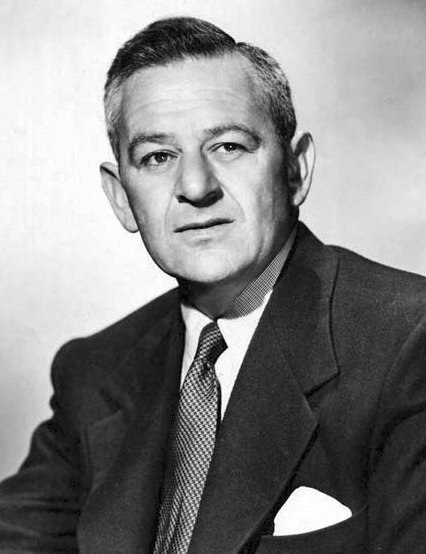
William Wyler, Best Director winner

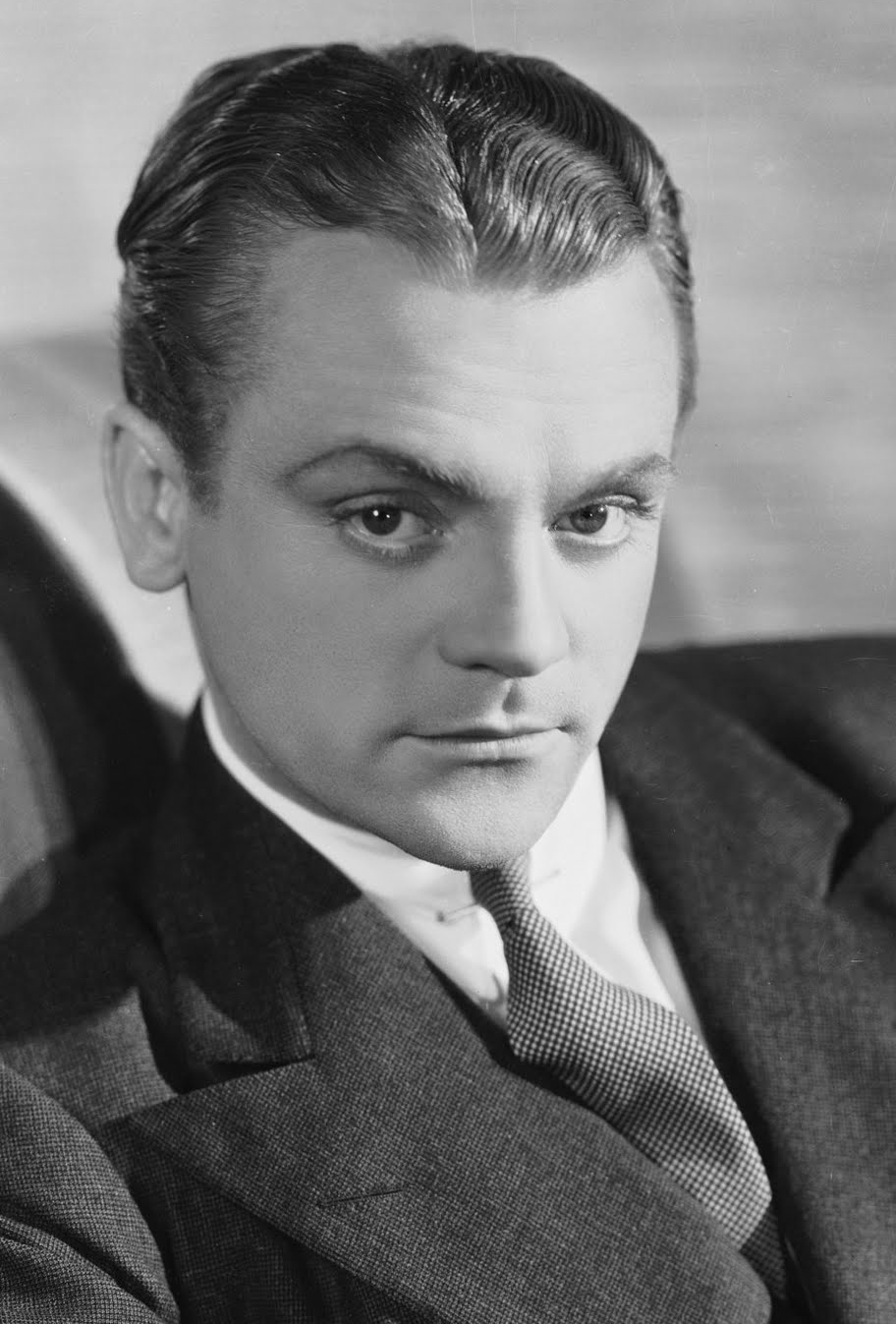
James Cagney, Best Actor winner

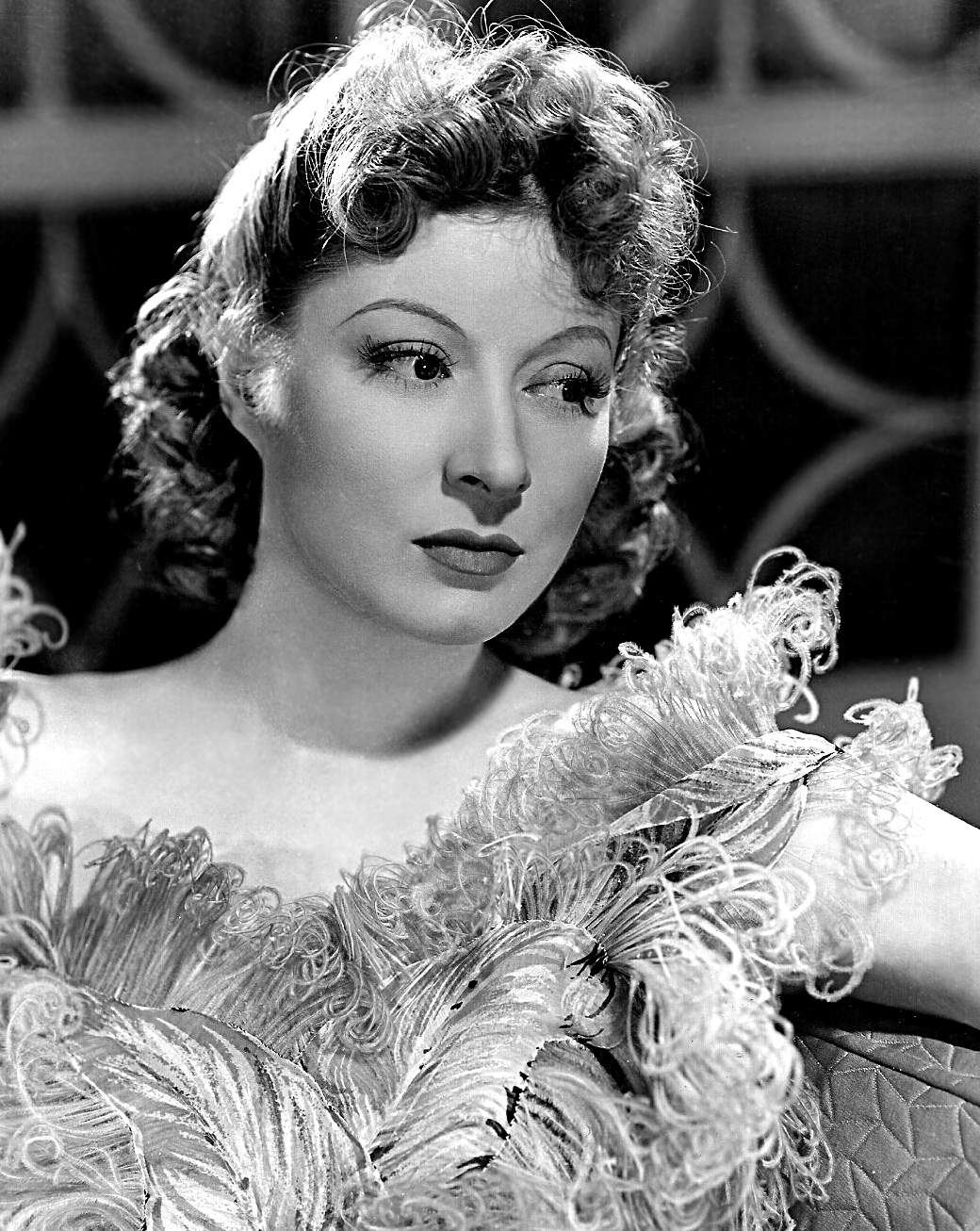
Greer Garson, Best Actress winner

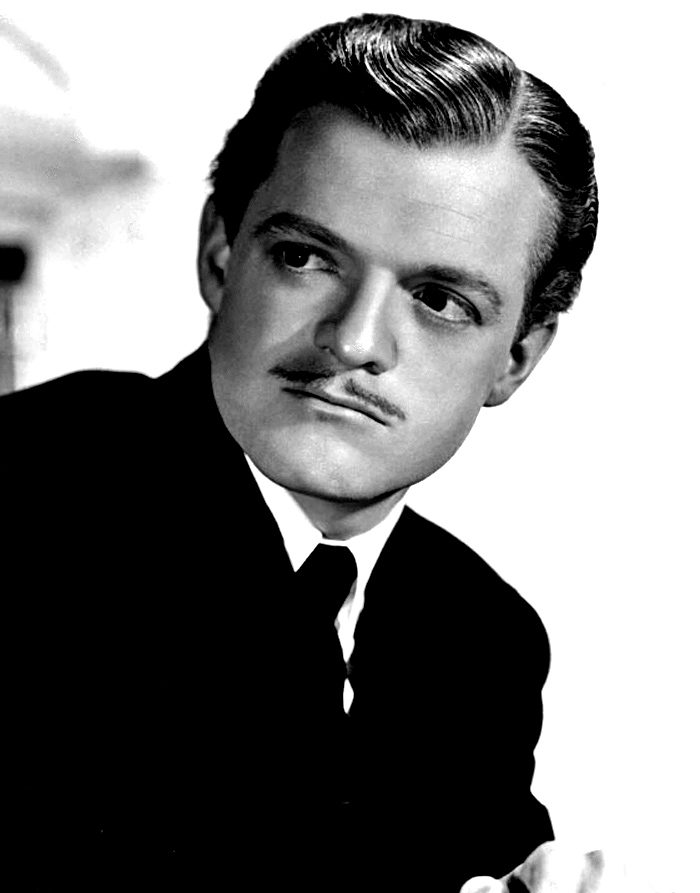
Van Heflin, Best Supporting Actor winner

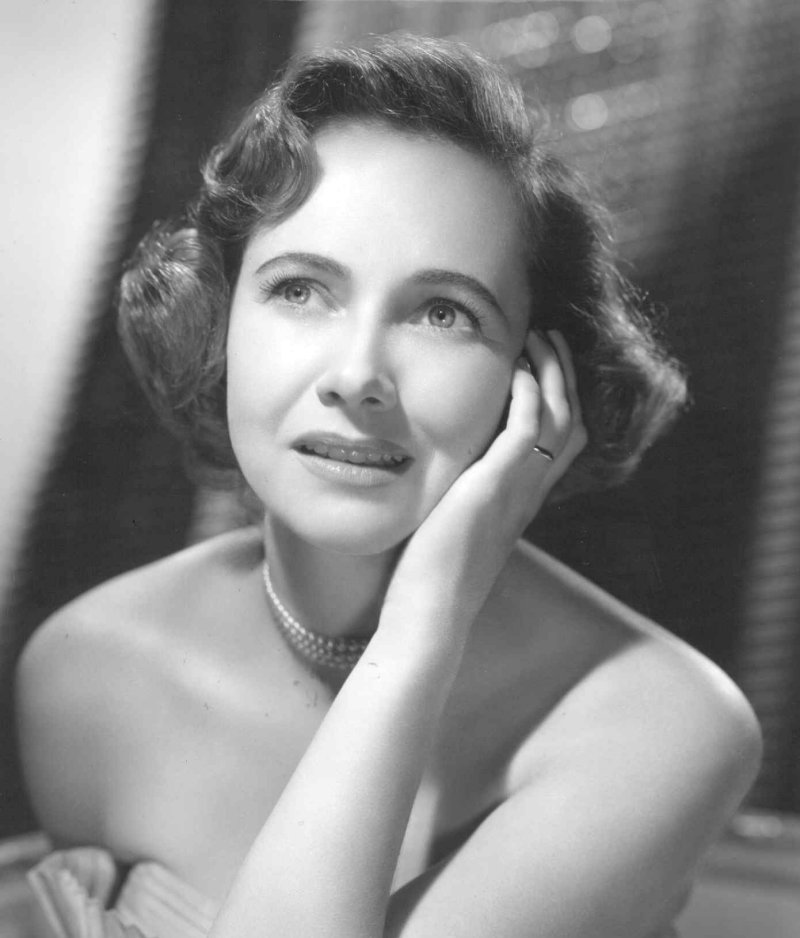
Teresa Wright, Best Supporting Actress winner

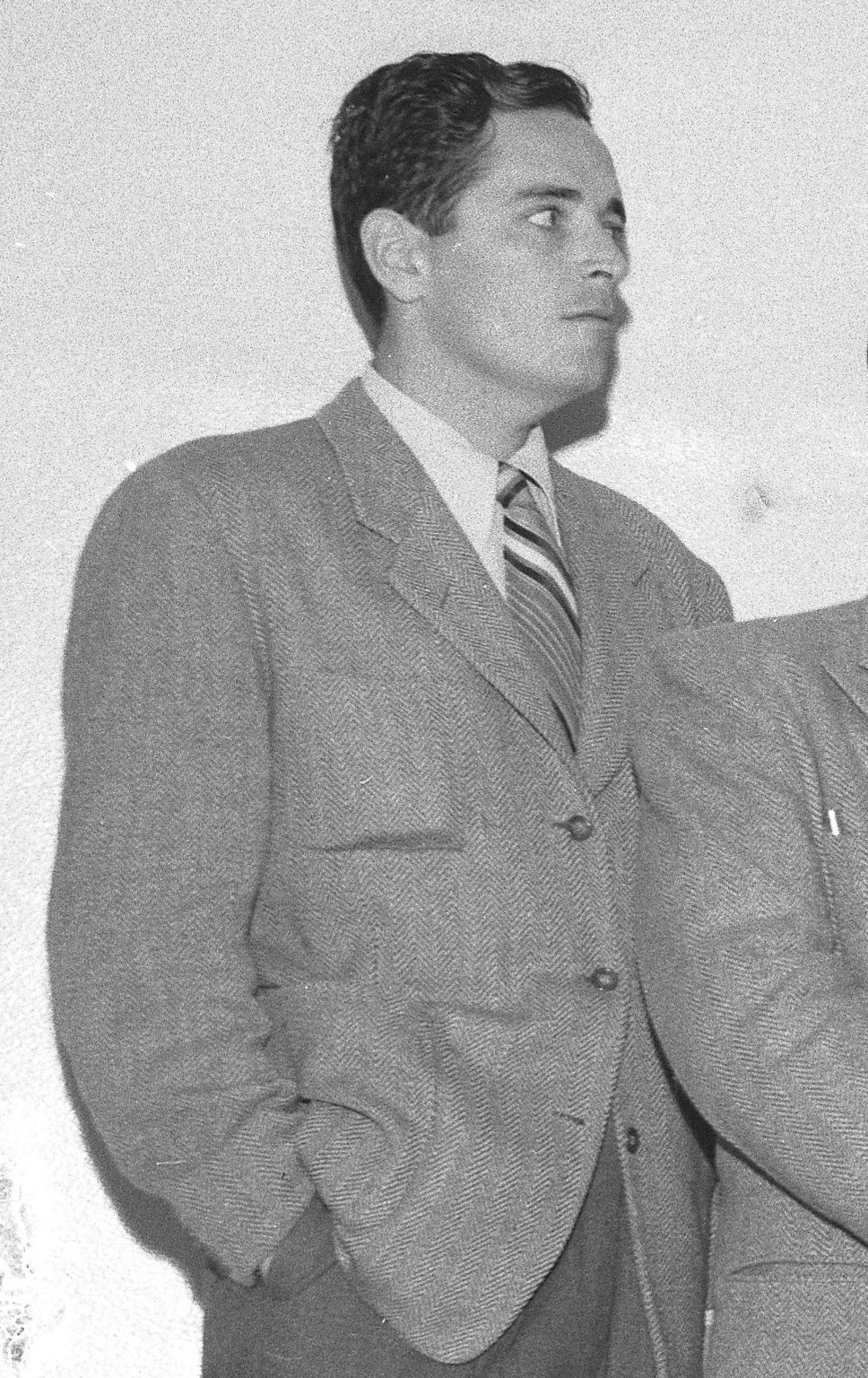
Ring Lardner Jr., Best Original Screenplay co-winner

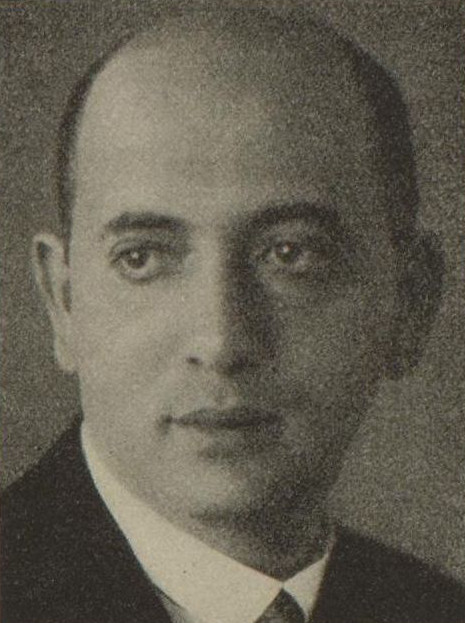
George Froeschel, Best Screenplay co-winner

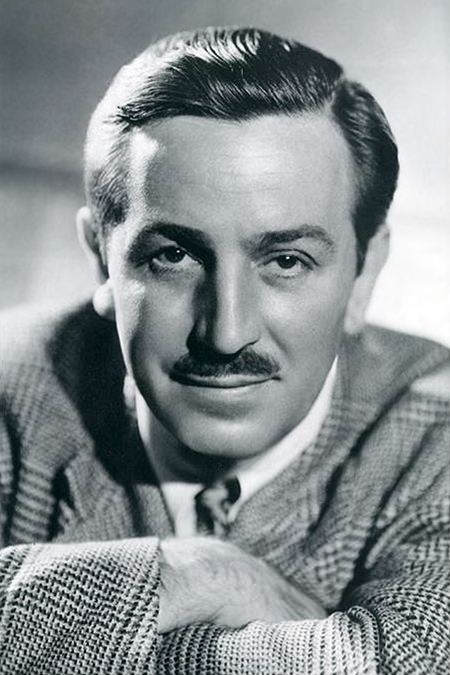
Walt Disney, Best Short Subjects – Cartoons winner

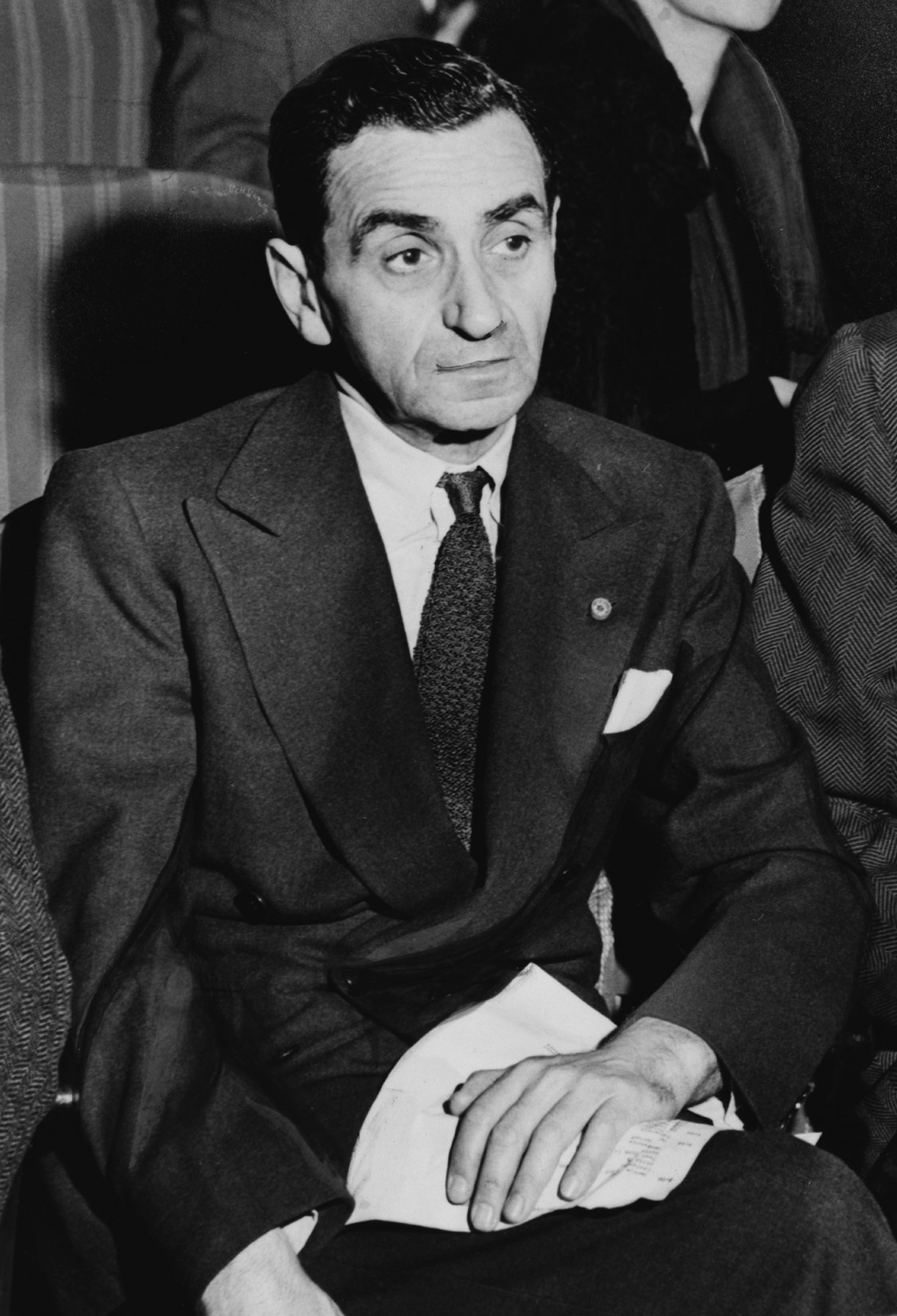
Irving Berlin, Best Original Song winner

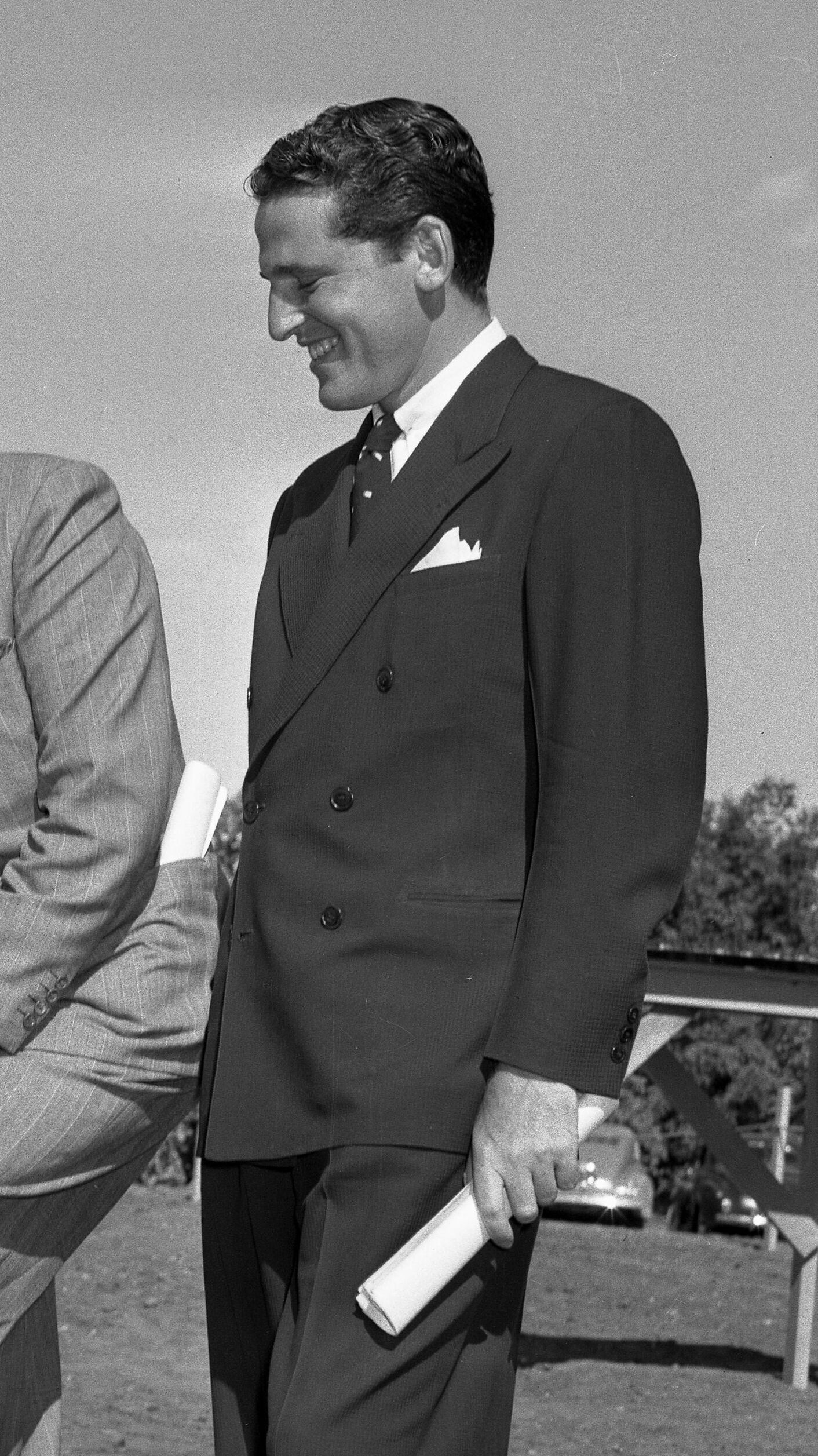
William Pereira, Best Special Effects co-winner

=== Awards ===
Nominees were announced on February 8, 1943. Winners are listed first and highlighted in boldface.

**Outstanding Motion Picture**: **Mrs. Miniver – Sidney Franklin for Metro-Goldwyn-Mayer**; 49th Parallel – Michael Powell for Ortus; Kings Row – Hal B. Wallis for Warner Bros.; The Magnificent Ambersons – Orson Welles for Mercury and RKO Radio; The Pied Piper – Nunnally Johnson for 20th Century Fox; The Pride of the Yankees – Samuel Goldwyn for Samuel Goldwyn Productions and RKO Radio; Random Harvest – Sidney Franklin for Metro-Goldwyn-Mayer; The Talk of the Town – George Stevens for Columbia; Wake Island – Joseph Sistrom for Paramount; Yankee Doodle Dandy – Jack L. Warner, Hal B. Wallis, and William Cagney for Warner Bros.	**Best Directing**: **William Wyler – Mrs. Miniver**; Sam Wood – Kings Row; Mervyn LeRoy – Random Harvest; John Farrow – Wake Island; Michael Curtiz – Yankee Doodle Dandy
**Best Actor**: **James Cagney – Yankee Doodle Dandy as George M. Cohan**; Ronald Colman – Random Harvest as Charles Rainier; Gary Cooper – The Pride of the Yankees as Lou Gehrig; Walter Pidgeon – Mrs. Miniver as Clem Miniver; Monty Woolley – The Pied Piper as Howard	**Best Actress**: **Greer Garson – Mrs. Miniver as Kay Miniver**; Bette Davis – Now, Voyager as Charlotte Vale; Katharine Hepburn – Woman of the Year as Tess Harding; Rosalind Russell – My Sister Eileen as Ruth Sherwood; Teresa Wright – The Pride of the Yankees as Eleanor Twitchell Gehrig
**Best Actor in a Supporting Role**: **Van Heflin – Johnny Eager as Jeff Hartnett**; William Bendix – Wake Island as Private Aloysius K. Randall; Walter Huston – Yankee Doodle Dandy as Jerry Cohan; Frank Morgan – Tortilla Flat as The Pirate; Henry Travers – Mrs. Miniver as James Ballard	**Best Actress in a Supporting Role**: **Teresa Wright – Mrs. Miniver as Carol Beldon**; Gladys Cooper – Now, Voyager as Windle Vale; Agnes Moorehead – The Magnificent Ambersons as Fanny Minafer; Susan Peters – Random Harvest as Kitty Chilcet; May Whitty – Mrs. Miniver as Lady Beldon
**Best Writing (Original Motion Picture Story)**: **49th Parallel – Emeric Pressburger**; Holiday Inn – Irving Berlin; The Pride of the Yankees – Paul Gallico; The Talk of the Town – Sidney Harmon; Yankee Doodle Dandy – Robert Buckner	**Best Writing (Original Screenplay)**: **Woman of the Year – Michael Kanin and Ring Lardner Jr.**; One of Our Aircraft Is Missing – Michael Powell and Emeric Pressburger; Road to Morocco – Frank Butler and Don Hartman; Wake Island – W. R. Burnett and Frank Butler; The War Against Mrs. Hadley – George Oppenheimer
**Best Writing (Screenplay)**: **Mrs. Miniver – George Froeschel, James Hilton, Claudine West, and Arthur Wimperis, based on the Mrs. Miniver newspaper columns by Jan Struther**; 49th Parallel – Rodney Ackland and Emeric Pressburger, based on a story by Emeric Pressburger; The Pride of the Yankees – Herman J. Mankiewicz and Jo Swerling, based on a story by Paul Gallico; Random Harvest – George Froeschel, Claudine West, and Arthur Wimperis, based on the novel by James Hilton; The Talk of the Town – Sidney Buchman and Irwin Shaw, based on a story by Sidney Harmon	**Best Documentary**: **The Battle of Midway – John Ford and United States Navy**; **Kokoda Front Line! – Ken G. Hall and Australian News and Information Bureau**; **Moscow Strikes Back – Artkino**; **Prelude to War – Frank Capra and United States Army Special Services**; Africa, Prelude to Victory – The March of Time; Combat Report – United States Army Signal Corps; Conquer by the Clock – Frederic Ullman Jr. Slavko Vorkapich; The Grain That Built a Hemisphere – Walt Disney; Henry Browne, Farmer – United States Department of Agriculture; High Over the Borders – National Film Board of Canada; High Stakes in the East – The Netherlands Information Bureau; Inside Fighting China – National Film Board of Canada; It's Everybody's War – United States Office of War Information; Listen to Britain – British Ministry of Information; Little Belgium – Belgian Ministry of Information; Little Isles of Freedom – Victor Stoloff and Edgar Loew; Mr. Blabbermouth! – United States Office of War Information; Mr. Gardenia Jones – United States Office of War Information; The New Spirit – Walt Disney; The Price of Victory – William H. Pine; A Ship Is Born – United States Merchant Marine; Twenty-One Miles – British Ministry of Information; We Refuse to Die – William C. Thomas; White Eagle – Concanen Films; Winning Your Wings – United States Army Air Force
**Best Short Subject (One-Reel)**: **Speaking of Animals and Their Families – Paramount**; Desert Wonderland – 20th Century Fox; Marines in the Making – Pete Smith; United States Marine Band – Warner Bros.	**Best Short Subject (Two-Reel)**: **Beyond the Line of Duty – Warner Bros.**; Don't Talk – Metro-Goldwyn-Mayer; Private Smith of the U.S.A. – RKO Radio
**Best Short Subject (Cartoon)**: **Der Fuehrer's Face – Walt Disney**; All Out for "V" – Paul Terry; Blitz Wolf – Fred Quimby; Juke Box Jamboree – Walter Lantz; Pigs in a Polka – Leon Schlesinger; Tulips Shall Grow – George Pal	**Best Music (Music Score of a Dramatic or Comedy Picture)**: **Now, Voyager – Max Steiner**; Arabian Nights – Frank Skinner; Bambi – Frank Churchill (posthumous nomination) and Edward H. Plumb; The Black Swan – Alfred Newman; The Corsican Brothers – Dimitri Tiomkin; Flying Tigers – Victor Young; The Gold Rush – Max Terr; I Married a Witch – Roy Webb; Joan of Paris – Roy Webb; Jungle Book – Miklós Rózsa; Klondike Fury – Edward J. Kay; The Pride of the Yankees – Leigh Harline; Random Harvest – Herbert Stothart; The Shanghai Gesture – Richard Hageman; Silver Queen – Victor Young; Take a Letter, Darling – Victor Young; The Talk of the Town – Frederick Hollander and Morris Stoloff; To Be or Not to Be – Werner R. Heymann
**Best Music (Scoring of a Musical Picture)**: **Yankee Doodle Dandy – Ray Heindorf and Heinz Roemheld**; Flying with Music – Edward Ward; For Me and My Gal – Roger Edens and Georgie Stoll; Holiday Inn – Robert E. Dolan; It Started with Eve – Charles Previn and Hans J. Salter; Johnny Doughboy – Walter Scharf; My Gal Sal – Alfred Newman; You Were Never Lovelier – Leigh Harline	**Best Music (Song)**: **"White Christmas" from Holiday Inn – Music and Lyrics by Irving Berlin**; "Always in My Heart" from Always in My Heart – Music by Ernesto Lecuona; Lyrics by Kim Gannon; "Dearly Beloved" from You Were Never Lovelier – Music by Jerome Kern; Lyrics by Johnny Mercer; "How About You?" from Babes on Broadway – Music by Burton Lane; Lyrics by Ralph Freed; "I've Got a Gal in Kalamazoo" from Orchestra Wives – Music by Harry Warren; Lyrics by Mack Gordon; "I've Heard That Song Before" from Youth on Parade – Music by Jule Styne; Lyrics by Sammy Cahn; "Love Is a Song" from Bambi – Music by Frank Churchill (posthumous nomination); Lyrics by Larry Morey; "Pennies for Peppino" from Flying with Music – Music by Edward Ward; Lyrics by Chet Forrest and Bob Wright; "Pig Foot Pete" from Hellzapoppin' – Music by Gene de Paul; Lyrics by Don Raye; "There's a Breeze on Lake Louise" from The Mayor of 44th Street – Music by Harry Revel; Lyrics by Mort Greene
**Best Sound Recording**: **Yankee Doodle Dandy – Nathan Levinson**; Arabian Nights – Bernard B. Brown; Bambi – Sam Slyfield; Flying Tigers – Daniel J. Bloomberg; Friendly Enemies – Jack Whitney; The Gold Rush – James L. Fields; Mrs. Miniver – Douglas Shearer; Once Upon a Honeymoon – Stephen Dunn; The Pride of the Yankees – Thomas T. Moulton; Road to Morocco – Loren L. Ryder; This Above All – E. H. Hansen; You Were Never Lovelier – John P. Livadary	**Best Art Direction (Black-and-White)**: **This Above All – Art Direction: Richard Day and Joseph C. Wright; Interior Decoration: Thomas Little**; George Washington Slept Here – Art Direction: Max Parker and Mark-Lee Kirk; Interior Decoration: Casey Roberts; The Magnificent Ambersons – Art Direction: Albert S. D'Agostino; Interior Decoration: Al Fields and Darrell Silvera; The Pride of the Yankees – Art Direction: Perry Ferguson; Interior Decoration: Howard Bristol; Random Harvest – Art Direction: Cedric Gibbons and Randall Duell; Interior Decoration: Edwin B. Willis and Jack D. Moore; The Shanghai Gesture – Art Direction and Interior Decoration: Boris Leven; Silver Queen – Art Direction: Ralph Berger; Interior Decoration: Emile Kuri; The Spoilers – Art Direction: Jack Otterson and John B. Goodman; Interior Decoration: Russell A. Gausman and Edward R. Robinson; Take a Letter, Darling – Art Direction: Hans Dreier and Roland Anderson; Interior Decoration: Samuel M. Comer; The Talk of the Town – Art Direction: Lionel Banks and Rudolph Sternad; Interior Decoration: Fay Babcock
**Best Art Direction (Color)**: **My Gal Sal – Art Direction: Richard Day and Joseph C. Wright; Interior Decoration: Thomas Little**; Arabian Nights – Art Direction: Alexander Golitzen and Jack Otterson; Interior Decoration: Russell A. Gausman and Ira S. Webb; Captains of the Clouds – Art Direction: Ted Smith; Interior Decoration: Casey Roberts; Jungle Book – Art Direction: Vincent Korda; Interior Decoration: Julia Heron; Reap the Wild Wind – Art Direction: Hans Dreier and Roland Anderson; Interior Decoration: George Sawley	**Best Cinematography (Black-and-White)**: **Mrs. Miniver – Joseph Ruttenberg**; Kings Row – James Wong Howe; The Magnificent Ambersons – Stanley Cortez; Moontide – Charles G. Clarke; The Pied Piper – Edward Cronjager; The Pride of the Yankees – Rudolph Maté; Take a Letter, Darling – John J. Mescall; The Talk of the Town – Ted Tetzlaff; Ten Gentlemen from West Point – Leon Shamroy; This Above All – Arthur C. Miller
**Best Cinematography (Color)**: **The Black Swan – Leon Shamroy**; Arabian Nights – Milton Krasner, William V. Skall, and W. Howard Greene; Captains of the Clouds – Sol Polito; Jungle Book – W. Howard Greene; Reap the Wild Wind – Victor Milner and William V. Skall; To the Shores of Tripoli – Edward Cronjager and William V. Skall	**Best Film Editing**: **The Pride of the Yankees – Daniel Mandell**; Mrs. Miniver – Harold F. Kress; The Talk of the Town – Otto Meyer; This Above All – Walter A. Thompson; Yankee Doodle Dandy – George Amy
**Best Special Effects**: **Reap the Wild Wind – Photographic Effects: Farciot Edouart, Gordon Jennings, and William Pereira; Sound Effects: Louis Mesenkop**; The Black Swan – Photographic Effects: Fred Sersen; Sound Effects: Roger Heman, Sr. and George Leverett; Desperate Journey – Photographic Effects: Byron Haskin; Sound Effects: Nathan Levinson; Flying Tigers – Photographic Effects: Howard Lydecker; Sound Effects: Daniel J. Bloomberg; Invisible Agent – Photographic Effects: John P. Fulton; Sound Effects: Bernard B. Brown; Jungle Book – Photographic Effects: Lawrence W. Butler; Sound Effects: William H. Wilmarth; Mrs. Miniver – Photographic Effects: A. Arnold Gillespie and Warren Newcombe; Sound Effects: Douglas Shearer; The Navy Comes Through – Photographic Effects: Vernon L. Walker; Sound Effects: James G. Stewart; One of Our Aircraft Is Missing – Photographic Effects: Ronald Neame; Sound Effects: C. C. Stevens; The Pride of the Yankees – Photographic Effects: Jack Cosgrove and Ray Binger; Sound Effects: Thomas T. Moulton

=== Special awards ===
- To Charles Boyer for his progressive cultural achievement in establishing the French Research Foundation in Los Angeles as a source of reference for the Hollywood Motion Picture Industry.
- To Noël Coward for his outstanding production achievement in In Which We Serve.
- To Metro-Goldwyn-Mayer for its achievement in representing the American Way of Life in the production of the Andy Hardy series of films.

=== Irving G. Thalberg Memorial Award ===
- Sidney Franklin

== Multiple nominations and awards ==
Films with multiple nominations
Nominations	Film
12	Mrs. Miniver
11	The Pride of the Yankees
8	Yankee Doodle Dandy
7	Random Harvest
7	The Talk of the Town
4	Arabian Nights
4	Jungle Book
4	The Magnificent Ambersons
4	This Above All
4	Wake Island
3	Bambi
3	The Black Swan
3	Flying Tigers
3	49th Parallel
3	Holiday Inn
3	Kings Row
3	Now, Voyager
3	The Pied Piper
3	Reap the Wild Wind
3	Take a Letter, Darling
3	You Were Never Lovelier
2	Captains of the Clouds
2	Flying with Music
2	The Gold Rush
2	My Gal Sal
2	One of Our Aircraft Is Missing
2	Road to Morocco
2	The Shanghai Gesture
2	Silver Queen
2	Woman of the Year

Films with multiple awards
Awards	Film
6	Mrs. Miniver
3	Yankee Doodle Dandy

== Ceremony information ==
William Wyler was the first person born in 20th century to win the best director. This ceremony was the last to include a banquet as part of the festivities due to increased attendance and the continuance of World War II. Ceremonies would be held in theaters starting with the 16th Academy Awards in 1944. Because of wartime commitments, the usually gold-plated Oscar was made of plaster for this ceremony.

== See also ==
- 1942 in film
