= Academy Award for Best Documentary Feature Film =

Award for documentary films

- Country: United States
- Presented by: Academy of Motion Picture Arts and Sciences (AMPAS)
- First award: March 4, 1943; 83 years ago (for films released in 1942)
- Most recent winner: David Borenstein, Pavel Talankin, Helle Faber and Alžběta Karásková; Mr Nobody Against Putin (2025)
- Website: oscars.org

The Academy Award for Best Documentary Feature Film is an award for documentary films. In 1941, the first awards for feature-length documentaries were bestowed as Special Awards to Kukan and Target for Tonight. They have since been bestowed competitively each year, with the exception of 1946. Copies of every winning film (along with copies of most nominees) are held by the Academy Film Archive.

== Winners and nominees ==
Following the Academy's practice, films are listed below by the award year (that is, the year they were released under the Academy's rules for eligibility). In practice, due to the limited nature of documentary distribution, a film may be released in different years in different venues, sometimes years after production is complete.

=== 1940s ===
Year	Film	Nominees
1942 (15th) (Note: In 1942, documentary features and short subjects competed together for Best Documentary. Four special awards were bestowed among the 25 nominees.)	The Battle of Midway	John Ford (United States Navy)
1942 (15th)	Kokoda Front Line!	Ken G. Hall (Australian News & Information Bureau)
1942 (15th)	Moscow Strikes Back	Artkino
1942 (15th)	Prelude to War	Frank Capra (Office of War Information)
1942 (15th)	Africa, Prelude to Victory	The March of Time
1942 (15th)	Combat Report	United States Army Signal Corps
1942 (15th)	Conquer by the Clock	Frederic Ullman Jr. Slavko Vorkapich
1942 (15th)	The Grain That Built a Hemisphere	Walt Disney
1942 (15th)	Henry Browne, Farmer	United States Department of Agriculture
1942 (15th)	High Over the Borders	National Film Board of Canada
1942 (15th)	High Stakes in the East	The Netherlands Information Bureau
1942 (15th)	Inside Fighting China	National Film Board of Canada
1942 (15th)	It's Everybody's War	United States Office of War Information
1942 (15th)	Listen to Britain	British Ministry of Information
1942 (15th)	Little Belgium	Belgian Ministry of Information
1942 (15th)	Little Isles of Freedom	Victor Stoloff and Edgar Loew
1942 (15th)	Mr. Blabbermouth	United States Office of War Information
1942 (15th)	Mr. Gardenia Jones	United States Office of War Information
1942 (15th)	The New Spirit	Walt Disney
1942 (15th)	The Price of Victory	William H. Pine
1942 (15th)	A Ship Is Born	United States Merchant Marine
1942 (15th)	Twenty-One Miles	British Ministry of Information
1942 (15th)	We Refuse to Die	William C. Thomas
1942 (15th)	The White Eagle	Concanen Films
1942 (15th)	Winning Your Wings	United States Army Air Force
1943 (16th) (Note: A preliminary list of eight films were announced as nominees, but the Documentary Award Committee subsequently narrowed the field to five titles included on the final ballot. The films that did not advance were: For God and Country (United States Army Pictorial Service), Silent Village (British Ministry of Information), and We've Come a Long, Long Way (Negro Marches On, Inc.).)	Desert Victory	British Ministry of Information
1943 (16th)	Baptism of Fire	United States Army
1943 (16th)	The Battle of Russia	United States Department of War Special Service Division
1943 (16th)	Report from the Aleutians	United States Army Pictorial Service
1943 (16th)	War Department Report	United States Office of Strategic Services Field Photographic Bureau
1944 (17th)	The Fighting Lady	Edward Steichen (United States Navy)
1944 (17th)	Resisting Enemy Interrogation	United States Army Air Force
1945 (18th)	The True Glory	The Governments of Great Britain and the United States of America
1945 (18th)	The Last Bomb	United States Army Air Force
1947 (20th)	Design for Death	Sid Rogell, Theron Warth and Richard Fleischer
1947 (20th)	Journey into Medicine	United States Department of State Office of Information and Educational Exchange
1947 (20th)	The World Is Rich	Paul Rotha
1948 (21st)	The Secret Land	Orville O. Dull
1948 (21st)	The Quiet One	Janice Loeb
1949 (22nd)	Daybreak in Udi	Crown Film Unit
1949 (22nd)	Kenji Comes Home	Paul F. Heard

=== 1950s ===
Year	Film	Nominees
1950 (23rd)	The Titan: Story of Michelangelo	Robert Snyder
1950 (23rd)	With These Hands	Jack Arnold and Lee Goodman
1951 (24th)	Kon-Tiki	Olle Nordemar
1951 (24th)	I Was a Communist for the F.B.I.	Bryan Foy
1952 (25th)	The Sea Around Us	Irwin Allen
1952 (25th)	The Hoaxters	Dore Schary
1952 (25th)	Navajo	Hall Bartlett
1953 (26th)	The Living Desert	Walt Disney
1953 (26th)	The Conquest of Everest	John Taylor, Leon Clore and Grahame Tharp
1953 (26th)	A Queen Is Crowned	Castleton Knight
1954 (27th)	The Vanishing Prairie	Walt Disney
1954 (27th)	The Stratford Adventure	Guy Glover
1955 (28th)	Helen Keller in Her Story	Nancy Hamilton
1955 (28th)	Heartbreak Ridge	René Risacher
1956 (29th)	The Silent World	Jacques-Yves Cousteau
1956 (29th)	The Naked Eye	Louis Clyde Stoumen
1956 (29th)	Where Mountains Float	The Government Film Committee of Denmark
1957 (30th)	Albert Schweitzer	Jerome Hill
1957 (30th)	On the Bowery	Lionel Rogosin
1957 (30th)	Torero!	Manuel Barbachano Ponce
1958 (31st)	White Wilderness	Ben Sharpsteen
1958 (31st)	Antarctic Crossing	James Carr
1958 (31st)	The Hidden World	Robert Snyder
1958 (31st)	Psychiatric Nursing	Nathan Zucker
1959 (32nd)	Serengeti Shall Not Die	Bernhard Grzimek
1959 (32nd)	The Race for Space	David L. Wolper

=== 1960s ===
Year	Film	Nominees
1960 (33rd)	The Horse with the Flying Tail	Larry Lansburgh
1960 (33rd)	Rebel in Paradise	Robert D. Fraser
1961 (34th)	Le Ciel et la Boue (Sky Above and Mud Beneath)	Arthur Cohn and René Lafuite
1961 (34th)	La Grande Olimpiade (Olympic Games 1960)	dell Istituto Nazionale Luce, Comitato Organizzatore Del Giochi Della XVII Olimpiade
1962 (35th)	Black Fox	Louis Clyde Stoumen
1962 (35th)	Alvorada (Brazil's Changing Face)	Hugo Niebeling
1963 (36th) (Note: Terminus was originally announced as a nominee, but the nomination was rescinded after it was discovered the film had been released prior to the eligibility period.)	Robert Frost: A Lover's Quarrel with the World	Robert Hughes
1963 (36th)	Le Maillon et la Chaine (The Link and the Chain)	Paul de Roubaix
1963 (36th)	The Yanks Are Coming	Marshall Flaum
1964 (37th)	Jacques-Yves Cousteau's World without Sun	Jacques-Yves Cousteau
1964 (37th)	The Finest Hours	Jack Le Vien
1964 (37th)	Four Days in November	Mel Stuart
1964 (37th)	The Human Dutch	Bert Haanstra
1964 (37th)	Over There, 1914–18	Jean Aurel
1965 (38th)	The Eleanor Roosevelt Story	Sidney Glazier
1965 (38th)	The Battle of the Bulge... The Brave Rifles	Laurence E. Mascott
1965 (38th)	The Forth Road Bridge	Peter Mills
1965 (38th)	Let My People Go	Marshall Flaum
1965 (38th)	To Die in Madrid	Frédéric Rossif
1966 (39th)	The War Game	Peter Watkins
1966 (39th)	The Face of a Genius	Alfred R. Kelman
1966 (39th)	Helicopter Canada	Peter Jones and Tom Daly
1966 (39th)	The Really Big Family	Alex Grasshoff
1966 (39th)	Le Volcan Interdit (The Forbidden Volcano)	Haroun Tazieff
1967 (40th)	The Anderson Platoon	Pierre Schoendoerffer
1967 (40th)	Festival	Murray Lerner
1967 (40th)	Harvest	Carroll Ballard
1967 (40th)	A King's Story	Jack Le Vien
1967 (40th)	A Time for Burning	William C. Jersey
1968 (41st) (Note: Young Americans, produced by Robert Cohn and Alex Grasshoff, won this award on April 14, 1969. On May 7, 1969, the win and nomination were rescinded after it was discovered the film had been released prior to the eligibility period. First runner-up Journey into Self was named the winner the following day.)	Journey into Self	Bill McGaw
1968 (41st)	A Few Notes on Our Food Problem	James Blue
1968 (41st)	The Legendary Champions	William Cayton
1968 (41st)	Other Voices	David H. Sawyer
1969 (42nd)	Arthur Rubinstein – The Love of Life	Bernard Chevry
1969 (42nd)	Before the Mountain Was Moved	Robert K. Sharpe
1969 (42nd)	In the Year of the Pig	Emile de Antonio
1969 (42nd)	The Olympics in Mexico	Comite Organizador de los Juegos de la XIX Olimpiada
1969 (42nd)	The Wolf Men	Irwin Rosten

=== 1970s ===
Year	Film	Nominees
1970 (43rd)	Woodstock	Bob Maurice
1970 (43rd)	Chariots of the Gods	Dr. Harald Reinl
1970 (43rd)	Jack Johnson	Jim Jacobs
1970 (43rd)	King: A Filmed Record... Montgomery to Memphis	Ely Landau
1970 (43rd)	Say Goodbye	David H. Vowell
1971 (44th)	The Hellstrom Chronicle	Walon Green
1971 (44th)	Alaska Wilderness Lake	Alan Landsburg
1971 (44th)	On Any Sunday	Bruce Brown
1971 (44th)	The RA Expeditions	Lennart Ehrenborg and Thor Heyerdahl
1971 (44th)	The Sorrow and the Pity	Marcel Ophüls
1972 (45th)	Marjoe	Howard Smith and Sarah Kernochan
1972 (45th)	Ape and Super-Ape	Bert Haanstra
1972 (45th)	Malcolm X	Marvin Worth and Arnold Perl
1972 (45th)	Manson	Robert Hendrickson and Laurence Merrick
1972 (45th)	The Silent Revolution	Eckehard Munck
1973 (46th)	The Great American Cowboy	Kieth Merrill
1973 (46th)	Always a New Beginning	John D. Goodell
1973 (46th)	Battle of Berlin	Bengt von zur Muehlen
1973 (46th)	Journey to the Outer Limits	Alexander Grasshoff
1973 (46th)	Walls of Fire	Gertrude Ross Marks and Edmund F. Penney
1974 (47th)	Hearts and Minds	Peter Davis and Bert Schneider
1974 (47th)	Antonia: A Portrait of the Woman	Judy Collins and Jill Godmilow
1974 (47th)	The Challenge... A Tribute to Modern Art	Herbert Kline
1974 (47th)	The 81st Blow	Jacquot Ehrlich, David Bergman and Haim Gouri
1974 (47th)	The Wild and the Brave	Natalie R. Jones and Eugene S. Jones
1975 (48th)	The Man Who Skied Down Everest	F. R. Crawley, James Hager and Dale Hartlebe
1975 (48th)	The California Reich	Walter F. Parkes and Keith F. Critchlow
1975 (48th)	Fighting for Our Lives	Glen Pearcy
1975 (48th)	The Incredible Machine	Irwin Rosten
1975 (48th)	The Other Half of the Sky: A China Memoir	Shirley MacLaine
1976 (49th)	Harlan County, U.S.A.	Barbara Kopple
1976 (49th)	Hollywood on Trial	James Gutman and David Helpern Jr.
1976 (49th)	Off the Edge	Michael Firth
1976 (49th)	People of the Wind	Anthony Howarth and David Koff
1976 (49th)	Volcano: An Inquiry into the Life and Death of Malcolm Lowry	Donald Brittain and Robert Duncan
1977 (50th)	Who Are the DeBolts? And Where Did They Get Nineteen Kids?	John Korty, Dan McCann and Warren L. Lockhart
1977 (50th)	The Children of Theatre Street	Robert Dornhelm and Earle Mack
1977 (50th)	High Grass Circus	Bill Brind, Torben Schioler and Tony Ianzelo
1977 (50th)	Homage to Chagall: The Colours of Love	Harry Rasky
1977 (50th)	Union Maids	Jim Klein, Julia Reichert and Miles Mogulescu
1978 (51st)	Scared Straight!	Arnold Shapiro
1978 (51st)	The Lovers' Wind	Albert Lamorisse
1978 (51st)	Mysterious Castles of Clay	Alan Root
1978 (51st)	Raoni	Jean-Pierre Dutilleux, Barry Williams and Michel Gast
1978 (51st)	With Babies and Banners: Story of the Women's Emergency Brigade	Anne Bohlen, Lyn Goldfarb and Lorraine Gray
1979 (52nd)	Best Boy	Ira Wohl
1979 (52nd)	Generation on the Wind	David A. Vassar
1979 (52nd)	Going the Distance	Paul Cowan and Jacques Bobet
1979 (52nd)	The Killing Ground	Steve Singer and Tom Priestley
1979 (52nd)	The War at Home	Glenn Silber and Barry Alexander Brown

=== 1980s ===
Year	Film	Nominees
1980 (53rd)	From Mao to Mozart: Isaac Stern in China	Murray Lerner
1980 (53rd)	Agee	Ross Spears
1980 (53rd)	The Day After Trinity	Jon H. Else
1980 (53rd)	Front Line	David Bradbury
1980 (53rd)	The Yellow Star: The Persecution of the Jews in Europe 1933-45	Bengt von zur Mühlen and Arthur Cohn
1981 (54th)	Genocide	Arnold Schwartzman and Rabbi Marvin Hier
1981 (54th)	Against Wind and Tide: A Cuban Odyssey	Suzanne Bauman, Paul Neshamkin and Jim Burroughs
1981 (54th)	Brooklyn Bridge	Ken Burns
1981 (54th)	Eight Minutes to Midnight: A Portrait of Dr. Helen Caldicott	Mary Benjamin, Susanne Simpson and Boyd Estus
1981 (54th)	El Salvador: Another Vietnam	Glenn Silber and Tete Vasconcellos
1982 (55th)	Just Another Missing Kid	John Zaritsky
1982 (55th)	After the Axe	Sturla Gunnarsson and Steve Lucas
1982 (55th)	Ben's Mill	John Karol and Michel Chalufour
1982 (55th)	In Our Water	Meg Switzgable
1982 (55th)	A Portrait of Giselle	Joseph Wishy
1983 (56th)	He Makes Me Feel Like Dancin'	Emile Ardolino
1983 (56th)	Children of Darkness	Richard Kotuk and Ara Chekmayan
1983 (56th)	First Contact	Bob Connolly and Robin Anderson
1983 (56th)	The Profession of Arms	Michael Bryans and Tina Viljoen
1983 (56th)	Seeing Red	James Klein and Julia Reichert
1984 (57th)	The Times of Harvey Milk	Rob Epstein and Richard Schmiechen
1984 (57th)	High Schools	Charles Guggenheim and Nancy Sloss
1984 (57th)	In the Name of the People	Alex W. Drehsler and Frank Christopher
1984 (57th)	Marlene	Karel Dirka and Zev Braun
1984 (57th)	Streetwise	Cheryl McCall
1985 (58th)	Broken Rainbow	Maria Florio and Victoria Mudd
1985 (58th)	Las Madres: The Mothers of Plaza de Mayo	Susana Blaustein Muñoz and Lourdes Portillo
1985 (58th)	Soldiers in Hiding	Japhet Asher
1985 (58th)	The Statue of Liberty	Ken Burns and Buddy Squires
1985 (58th)	Unfinished Business	Steven Okazaki
1986 (59th) (Note: A tie in voting resulted in two winners.)	Artie Shaw: Time Is All You've Got (TIE)	Brigitte Berman
1986 (59th)	Down and Out in America (TIE)	Joseph Feury and Milton Justice
1986 (59th)	Chile: Hasta Cuando?	David Bradbury
1986 (59th)	Isaac in America: A Journey with Isaac Bashevis Singer	Kirk Simon and Amram Nowak
1986 (59th)	Witness to Apartheid	Sharon I. Sopher
1987 (60th)	The Ten-Year Lunch: The Wit and Legend of the Algonquin Round Table	Aviva Slesin
1987 (60th)	Eyes on the Prize: America's Civil Rights Years/Bridge to Freedom 1965	Callie Crossley and James A. DeVinney
1987 (60th)	Hellfire: A Journey from Hiroshima	John Junkerman and John W. Dower
1987 (60th)	Radio Bikini	Robert Stone
1987 (60th)	A Stitch for Time	Barbara Herbich and Cyril Christo
1988 (61st)	Hôtel Terminus: The Life and Times of Klaus Barbie	Marcel Ophüls
1988 (61st)	The Cry of Reason – Beyers Naudé: An Afrikaner Speaks Out	Robert Bilheimer and Ronald Mix
1988 (61st)	Let's Get Lost	Bruce Weber and Nan Bush
1988 (61st)	Promises to Keep	Ginny Durrin
1988 (61st)	Who Killed Vincent Chin?	Renee Tajima-Peña and Christine Choy
1989 (62nd)	Common Threads: Stories from the Quilt	Rob Epstein and Bill Couturié
1989 (62nd)	Adam Clayton Powell	Richard Kilberg and Yvonne Smith
1989 (62nd)	Crack USA: County Under Siege	Vince DiPersio and William Guttentag
1989 (62nd)	For All Mankind	Al Reinert and Betsy Broyles Breier
1989 (62nd)	Super Chief: The Life and Legacy of Earl Warren	Judith Leonard and William C. Jersey

=== 1990s ===
Year	Film	Nominees
1990 (63rd)	American Dream	Barbara Kopple and Arthur Cohn
1990 (63rd)	Berkeley in the Sixties	Mark Kitchell
1990 (63rd)	Building Bombs	Mark Mori and Susan Robinson
1990 (63rd)	Forever Activists: Stories from the Veterans of the Abraham Lincoln Brigade	Judith Montell
1990 (63rd)	Waldo Salt: A Screenwriter's Journey	Robert Hillmann and Eugene Corr
1991 (64th)	In the Shadow of the Stars	Allie Light and Irving Saraf
1991 (64th)	Death on the Job	Vince DiPersio and William Guttentag
1991 (64th)	Doing Time: Life Inside the Big House	Alan Raymond and Susan Raymond
1991 (64th)	The Restless Conscience: Resistance to Hitler Within Germany 1933-1945	Hava Kohav Beller
1991 (64th)	Wild by Law	Lawrence Hott and Diane Garey
1992 (65th)	The Panama Deception	Barbara Trent and David Kasper
1992 (65th)	Changing Our Minds: The Story of Dr. Evelyn Hooker	David Haugland
1992 (65th)	Fires of Kuwait	Sally Dundas
1992 (65th)	Liberators: Fighting on Two Fronts in World War II	Bill Miles and Nina Rosenblum
1992 (65th)	Music for the Movies: Bernard Herrmann	Margaret Smilow and Roma Baran
1993 (66th)	I Am a Promise: The Children of Stanton Elementary School	Susan Raymond and Alan Raymond
1993 (66th)	The Broadcast Tapes of Dr. Peter	David Paperny and Arthur Ginsberg
1993 (66th)	Children of Fate	Susan Todd and Andrew Young
1993 (66th)	For Better or For Worse	David Collier and Betsy Thompson
1993 (66th)	The War Room	D. A. Pennebaker and Chris Hegedus
1994 (67th)	Maya Lin: A Strong Clear Vision	Freida Lee Mock and Terry Sanders
1994 (67th)	Complaints of a Dutiful Daughter	Deborah Hoffmann
1994 (67th)	D-Day Remembered	Charles Guggenheim
1994 (67th)	Freedom on My Mind	Connie Field and Marilyn Mulford
1994 (67th)	A Great Day in Harlem	Jean Bach
1995 (68th)	Anne Frank Remembered	Jon Blair
1995 (68th)	The Battle Over Citizen Kane	Thomas Lennon and Michael Epstein
1995 (68th)	Fiddlefest — Roberta Tzavaras and Her East Harlem Violin Program	Allan Miller and Walter Scheuer
1995 (68th)	Hank Aaron: Chasing the Dream	Michael Tollin and Fredric Golding
1995 (68th)	Troublesome Creek: A Midwestern	Jeanne Jordan and Steven Ascher
1996 (69th)	When We Were Kings	Leon Gast and David Sonenberg
1996 (69th)	The Line King: The Al Hirschfeld Story	Susan W. Dryfoos
1996 (69th)	Mandela	Jo Menell and Angus Gibson
1996 (69th)	Suzanne Farrell: Elusive Muse	Anne Belle and Deborah Dickson
1996 (69th)	Tell the Truth and Run: George Seldes and the American Press	Rick Goldsmith
1997 (70th)	The Long Way Home	Marvin Hier and Richard Trank
1997 (70th)	4 Little Girls	Spike Lee and Sam Pollard
1997 (70th)	Ayn Rand: A Sense of Life	Michael Paxton
1997 (70th)	Colors Straight Up	Michèle Ohayon and Julia Schachter
1997 (70th)	Waco: The Rules of Engagement	Dan Gifford and William Gazecki
1998 (71st)	The Last Days	James Moll and Kenneth Lipper
1998 (71st)	Dancemaker	Matthew Diamond and Jerry Kupfer
1998 (71st)	The Farm: Angola, USA	Jonathan Stack and Liz Garbus
1998 (71st)	Lenny Bruce: Swear to Tell the Truth	Robert B. Weide
1998 (71st)	Regret to Inform	Barbara Sonneborn and Janet Cole
1999 (72nd)	One Day in September	Arthur Cohn and Kevin Macdonald
1999 (72nd)	Buena Vista Social Club	Wim Wenders and Ulrich Felsberg
1999 (72nd)	Genghis Blues	Roko Belic and Adrian Belic
1999 (72nd)	On the Ropes	Nanette Burstein and Brett Morgen
1999 (72nd)	Speaking in Strings	Paola di Florio and Lilibet Foster

=== 2000s ===
Year	Film	Nominees
2000 (73rd)	Into the Arms of Strangers: Stories of the Kindertransport	Mark Jonathan Harris and Deborah Oppenheimer
2000 (73rd)	Legacy	Tod Lending
2000 (73rd)	Long Night's Journey into Day	Deborah Hoffmann and Frances Reid
2000 (73rd)	Scottsboro: An American Tragedy	Daniel Anker and Barak Goodman
2000 (73rd)	Sound and Fury	Josh Aronson and Roger Weisberg
2001 (74th)	Murder on a Sunday Morning	Jean-Xavier de Lestrade and Denis Poncet
2001 (74th)	Children Underground	Edet Belzberg
2001 (74th)	LaLee's Kin: The Legacy of Cotton	Deborah Dickson and Susan Froemke
2001 (74th)	Promises	B.Z. Goldberg and Justine Shapiro
2001 (74th)	War Photographer	Christian Frei
2002 (75th)	Bowling for Columbine	Michael Moore and Michael Donovan
2002 (75th)	Daughter from Danang	Gail Dolgin and Vicente Franco
2002 (75th)	Prisoner of Paradise	Malcolm Clarke and Stuart Sender
2002 (75th)	Spellbound	Jeffrey Blitz and Sean Welch
2002 (75th)	Winged Migration	Jacques Perrin
2003 (76th)	The Fog of War	Errol Morris and Michael Williams
2003 (76th)	Balseros	Carles Bosch and Josep Maria Domenech
2003 (76th)	Capturing the Friedmans	Andrew Jarecki and Marc Smerling
2003 (76th)	My Architect	Nathaniel Kahn and Susan R. Behr
2003 (76th)	The Weather Underground	Sam Green and Bill Siegel
2004 (77th)	Born into Brothels	Ross Kauffman and Zana Briski
2004 (77th)	The Story of the Weeping Camel	Byambasuren Davaa and Luigi Falorni
2004 (77th)	Super Size Me	Morgan Spurlock
2004 (77th)	Tupac: Resurrection	Karolyn Ali and Lauren Lazin
2004 (77th)	Twist of Faith	Kirby Dick and Eddie Schmidt
2005 (78th)	March of the Penguins	Luc Jacquet and Yves Darondeau
2005 (78th)	Darwin's Nightmare	Hubert Sauper
2005 (78th)	Enron: The Smartest Guys in the Room	Alex Gibney and Jason Kliot
2005 (78th)	Murderball	Henry Alex Rubin and Dana Adam Shapiro
2005 (78th)	Street Fight	Marshall Curry
2006 (79th)	An Inconvenient Truth	Davis Guggenheim
2006 (79th)	Deliver Us from Evil	Amy Berg and Frank Donner
2006 (79th)	Iraq in Fragments	James Longley and John Sinno
2006 (79th)	Jesus Camp	Heidi Ewing and Rachel Grady
2006 (79th)	My Country, My Country	Jocelyn Glatzer and Laura Poitras
2007 (80th)	Taxi to the Dark Side	Alex Gibney and Eva Orner
2007 (80th)	No End in Sight	Charles Ferguson and Audrey Marrs
2007 (80th)	Operation Homecoming: Writing the Wartime Experience	Richard Robbins
2007 (80th)	Sicko	Michael Moore and Meghan O'Hara
2007 (80th)	War/Dance	Sean Fine and Andrea Nix Fine
2008 (81st)	Man on Wire	Simon Chinn and James Marsh
2008 (81st)	The Betrayal (Nerakhoon)	Ellen Kuras and Thavisouk Phrasavath
2008 (81st)	Encounters at the End of the World	Werner Herzog and Henry Kaiser
2008 (81st)	The Garden	Scott Hamilton Kennedy
2008 (81st)	Trouble the Water	Carl Deal and Tia Lessin
2009 (82nd)	The Cove	Louie Psihoyos and Fisher Stevens
2009 (82nd)	Burma VJ	Anders Østergaard and Lise Lense-Møller
2009 (82nd)	Food, Inc.	Robert Kenner and Elise Pearlstein
2009 (82nd)	The Most Dangerous Man in America: Daniel Ellsberg and the Pentagon Papers	Judith Ehrlich and Rick Goldsmith
2009 (82nd)	Which Way Home	Rebecca Cammisa

=== 2010s ===
Year	Film	Nominees
2010 (83rd)	Inside Job	Charles Ferguson and Audrey Marrs
2010 (83rd)	Exit Through the Gift Shop	Banksy and Jaimie D'Cruz
2010 (83rd)	Gasland	Josh Fox and Trish Adlesic
2010 (83rd)	Restrepo	Tim Hetherington and Sebastian Junger
2010 (83rd)	Waste Land	Lucy Walker and Angus Aynsley
2011 (84th)	Undefeated	T. J. Martin, Daniel Lindsay and Rich Middlemas
2011 (84th)	Hell and Back Again	Danfung Dennis and Mike Lerner
2011 (84th)	If a Tree Falls: A Story of the Earth Liberation Front	Marshall Curry and Sam Cullman
2011 (84th)	Paradise Lost 3: Purgatory	Joe Berlinger and Bruce Sinofsky
2011 (84th)	Pina	Wim Wenders and Gian-Piero Ringel
2012 (85th)	Searching for Sugar Man	Malik Bendjelloul and Simon Chinn
2012 (85th)	5 Broken Cameras	Emad Burnat and Guy Davidi
2012 (85th)	The Gatekeepers	Dror Moreh, Philippa Kowarsky, and Estelle Fialon
2012 (85th)	How to Survive a Plague	David France and Howard Gertler
2012 (85th)	The Invisible War	Kirby Dick and Amy Ziering
2013 (86th)	20 Feet from Stardom	Morgan Neville, Gil Friesen and Caitrin Rogers
2013 (86th)	The Act of Killing	Joshua Oppenheimer and Signe Byrge Sørensen
2013 (86th)	Cutie and the Boxer	Zachary Heinzerling and Lydia Dean Pilcher
2013 (86th)	Dirty Wars	Richard Rowley and Jeremy Scahill
2013 (86th)	The Square	Jehane Noujaim and Karim Amer
2014 (87th)	Citizenfour	Laura Poitras, Mathilde Bonnefoy and Dirk Wilutzky
2014 (87th)	Finding Vivian Maier	John Maloof and Charlie Siskel
2014 (87th)	Last Days in Vietnam	Rory Kennedy and Kevin McAlester
2014 (87th)	The Salt of the Earth	Wim Wenders, Juliano Ribeiro Salgado and David Rosier
2014 (87th)	Virunga	Orlando von Einsiedel and Joanna Natasegara
2015 (88th)	Amy	Asif Kapadia and James Gay-Rees
2015 (88th)	Cartel Land	Matthew Heineman and Tom Yellin
2015 (88th)	The Look of Silence	Joshua Oppenheimer and Signe Byrge Sørensen
2015 (88th)	What Happened, Miss Simone?	Liz Garbus, Amy Hobby and Justin Wilkes
2015 (88th)	Winter on Fire: Ukraine's Fight for Freedom	Evgeny Afineevsky and Den Tolmor
2016 (89th)	O.J.: Made in America	Ezra Edelman and Caroline Waterlow
2016 (89th)	Fire at Sea	Gianfranco Rosi and Donatella Palermo
2016 (89th)	I Am Not Your Negro	Raoul Peck, Rémi Grellety and Hébert Peck
2016 (89th)	Life, Animated	Roger Ross Williams and Julie Goldman
2016 (89th)	13th	Ava DuVernay, Spencer Averick and Howard Barish
2017 (90th)	Icarus	Bryan Fogel and Dan Cogan
2017 (90th)	Abacus: Small Enough to Jail	Steve James, Mark Mitten and Julie Goldman
2017 (90th)	Faces Places	Agnès Varda, JR and Rosalie Varda
2017 (90th)	Last Men in Aleppo	Feras Fayyad, Kareem Abeed and Søren Steen Jespersen
2017 (90th)	Strong Island	Yance Ford and Joslyn Barnes
2018 (91st)	Free Solo	Elizabeth Chai Vasarhelyi, Jimmy Chin, Evan Hayes, and Shannon Dill
2018 (91st)	Hale County This Morning, This Evening	RaMell Ross, Joslyn Barnes, and Su Kim
2018 (91st)	Minding the Gap	Bing Liu and Diane Quon
2018 (91st)	Of Fathers and Sons	Talal Derki, Ansgar Frerich, Eva Kemme, and Tobias N. Siebert
2018 (91st)	RBG	Betsy West and Julie Cohen
2019 (92nd)	American Factory	Steven Bognar, Julia Reichert and Jeff Reichert
2019 (92nd)	The Cave	Feras Fayyad, Kirstine Barfod and Sigrid Dyekjær
2019 (92nd)	The Edge of Democracy	Petra Costa, Joanna Natasegara, Shane Boris and Tiago Pavan
2019 (92nd)	For Sama	Waad al-Kateab and Edward Watts
2019 (92nd)	Honeyland	Ljubo Stefanov, Tamara Kotevska and Atanas Georgiev

=== 2020s ===
Year	Film	Nominees
2020/21 (93rd)	My Octopus Teacher	Pippa Ehrlich, James Reed and Craig Foster
2020/21 (93rd)	Collective	Alexander Nanau and Bianca Oana
2020/21 (93rd)	Crip Camp	Nicole Newnham, Jim LeBrecht and Sara Bolder
2020/21 (93rd)	The Mole Agent	Maite Alberdi and Marcela Santibáñez
2020/21 (93rd)	Time	Garrett Bradley, Lauren Domino and Kellen Quinn
2021 (94th)	Summer of Soul	Questlove, Joseph Patel, Robert Fyvolent, and David Dinerstein
2021 (94th)	Ascension	Jessica Kingdon, Kira Simon-Kennedy and Nathan Truesdell
2021 (94th)	Attica	Stanley Nelson and Traci A. Curry
2021 (94th)	Flee	Jonas Poher Rasmussen, Monica Hellström, Signe Byrge Sørensen and Charlotte De La Gournerie
2021 (94th)	Writing with Fire	Rintu Thomas and Sushmit Ghosh
2022 (95th)	Navalny	Daniel Roher, Odessa Rae, Diane Becker, Melanie Miller and Shane Boris
2022 (95th)	All That Breathes	Shaunak Sen, Aman Mann and Teddy Leifer
2022 (95th)	All the Beauty and the Bloodshed	Laura Poitras, Howard Gertler, John Lyons, Nan Goldin and Yoni Golijov
2022 (95th)	Fire of Love	Sara Dosa, Shane Boris and Ina Fichman
2022 (95th)	A House Made of Splinters	Simon Lereng Wilmont and Monica Hellström
2023 (96th)	20 Days in Mariupol	Mstyslav Chernov, Michelle Mizner and Raney Aronson-Rath
2023 (96th)	Bobi Wine: The People's President	Moses Bwayo, Christopher Sharp and John Battsek
2023 (96th)	The Eternal Memory	Maite Alberdi
2023 (96th)	Four Daughters	Kaouther Ben Hania and Nadim Cheikhrouha
2023 (96th)	To Kill a Tiger	Nisha Pahuja, Cornelia Principe and David Oppenheim
2024 (97th)	No Other Land	Basel Adra, Rachel Szor, Hamdan Ballal and Yuval Abraham
2024 (97th)	Black Box Diaries	Shiori Itō, Eric Nyari and Hanna Aqvilin
2024 (97th)	Porcelain War	Brendan Bellomo, Slava Leontyev, Aniela Sidorska and Paula DuPré Pesmen
2024 (97th)	Soundtrack to a Coup d'Etat	Johan Grimonprez, Daan Milius and Rémi Grellety
2024 (97th)	Sugarcane	Julian Brave NoiseCat, Emily Kassie and Kellen Quinn
2025 (98th)	Mr Nobody Against Putin	David Borenstein, Pavel Talankin, Helle Faber and Alžběta Karásková
2025 (98th)	The Alabama Solution	Andrew Jarecki and Charlotte Kaufman
2025 (98th)	Come See Me in the Good Light	Ryan White, Jessica Hargrave, Tig Notaro and Stef Willen
2025 (98th)	Cutting Through Rocks	Sara Khaki and Mohammadreza Eyni
2025 (98th)	The Perfect Neighbor	Geeta Gandbhir, Alisa Payne, Nikon Kwantu and Sam Bisbee

== Shortlisted finalists ==
Finalists for Best Documentary Feature are selected by the Documentary Branch based on a preliminary ballot. A second preferential ballot determines the five nominees. Prior to the 78th Academy Awards, there were twelve films shortlisted.

== Superlatives ==
For this Academy Award category, the following superlatives emerge:

- Most awards:
  - Arthur Cohn – 3 awards (resulting from 4 nominations);
  - Simon Chinn – 2 awards;
  - Jacques Cousteau – 2 awards;
  - Walt Disney – 2 awards (resulting from 7 nominations; Disney has an additional 2 wins in the Documentary Short Subject category);
  - Rob Epstein – 2 awards;
  - Marvin Hier – 2 awards;
  - Barbara Kopple – 2 awards

=== Age superlatives ===
Record	Recipient	Film	Age	Note
Oldest winner	Gil Friesen	20 Feet from Stardom	76 years, 357 days	Posthumous award
Oldest nominee	Agnès Varda	Faces Places	89 years, 238 days	
Youngest winner	Sarah Kernochan	Marjoe	25 years, 87 days	
Youngest nominee	Barry Alexander Brown	The War at Home	19 years, 89 days	

== Process controversies ==
Michael Moore's Fahrenheit 9/11, at the time the highest-grossing documentary film in movie history, was ruled ineligible because Moore had opted to have it played on television prior to the 2004 election. Previously, the 1982 winner Just Another Missing Kid had already been broadcast in Canada and won that country's ACTRA award for excellence in television at the time of its nomination.

In 1990, a group of 45 filmmakers filed a protest to the Academy of Motion Picture Arts and Sciences over a potential conflict of interest involving Mitchell Block. They noted that Block was a member of the Documentary Steering Committee, which selects films as nominees, but he had a conflict of interest because his company Direct Cinema owned the distribution rights to three of the five films (including eventual winner Common Threads: Stories from the Quilt) selected that year as nominees for an Academy Award for Best Documentary Feature. They noted that Michael Moore's Roger & Me (distributed by Warner Brothers) was omitted from the nominees, although it had been highly praised by numerous critics and was ranked by many critics as one of the top ten films of the year.

The controversy over Hoop Dreams' exclusion was enough to have the Academy Awards begin the process to change its documentary voting system. Roger Ebert, who had declared it to be the best 1994 movie of any kind, looked into its failure to receive a nomination: "We learned, through very reliable sources, that the members of the committee had a system. They carried little flashlights. When one gave up on a film, he waved a light on the screen. When a majority of flashlights had voted, the film was switched off. Hoop Dreams was stopped after 15 minutes."

The Academy's executive director, Bruce Davis, took the unprecedented step of asking accounting firm Price Waterhouse to turn over the complete results of that year's voting, in which members of the committee had rated each of the 63 eligible documentaries on a scale of six to ten. "What I found," said Davis, "is that a small group of members gave zeros (actually low scores) to every single film except the five they wanted to see nominated. And they gave tens to those five, which completely skewed the voting. There was one film that received more scores of ten than any other, but it wasn't nominated. It also got zeros (low scores) from those few voters, and that was enough to push it to sixth place."

In 2000, Arthur Cohn, the producer of the winning One Day in September boasted "I won this without showing it in a single theater!" Cohn had hit upon the tactic of showing his Oscar entries at invitation-only screenings, and to as few other people as possible. Oscar bylaws at the time required voters to have seen all five nominated documentaries; by limiting his audience, Cohn shrank the voting pool and improved his odds. Following protests by many documentarians, the nominating system was subsequently changed.

Hoop Dreams director Steve James said "With so few people looking at any given film, it only takes one to dislike a film, and its chances for making the shortlist are diminished greatly. So they've got to do something, I think, to make the process more sane for deciding the shortlist." Among other rule changes taking effect in 2013, the academy began requiring a documentary to have been reviewed by either The New York Times or Los Angeles Times, and be commercially released for at least one week in both of those cities. Advocating the rule change, Michael Moore said "When people get the award for best documentary and they go on stage and thank the Academy, it's not really the Academy, is it? It's 5% of the Academy."

The awards process has also been criticized for emphasizing a documentary's subject matter over its style or quality. In 2009, Entertainment Weekly's Owen Gleiberman wrote about the documentary branch members' penchant for choosing "movies that the selection committee deemed good because they're good for you... a kind of self-defeating aesthetic of granola documentary correctness."

In 2014, following the announcement of the shortlist of eligible feature documentary nominees, Sony Pictures Classics co-president Tom Bernard publicly criticized Academy documentary voters after they excluded SPC's Red Army from the shortlist. "It's a sign of some really old people in the documentary area of the Academy. There's a lot of people who are really up in their years. It's shocking to me that that film (Red Army) didn't get in," Bernard said. Additionally, in his reporting of the Oscar documentary shortlist exclusions that year, The Hollywood Reporter's Scott Feinberg reacted to Red Army's omission: "...no matter which 15 titles the doc branch selected, plenty of other great ones would be left on the outside. That is the case, most egregiously, with Gabe Polsky's Red Army (Sony Classics), a masterful look at the role of sports in society and Russian-American relations". (Icarus, another documentary related to sports and Russian-American relations, later won the Oscar.)

In 2017, following the win of the eight-hour O.J.: Made in America in this category, the Academy announced that multi-part and limited series would be ineligible for the award in the future, even if they are not broadcast after their Oscar-qualifying release (as was O.J.: Made in America).

Various other acclaimed documentaries have not been nominated such as:

- Dont Look Back (1967)
- Titicut Follies (1967)
- Salesman (1969)
- Gimme Shelter (1970)
- Grey Gardens (1975)
- Gates of Heaven (1978)
- Stop Making Sense (1984)
- Shoah (1985)
- The Thin Blue Line (1988)
- Roger & Me (1989)
- Paris Is Burning (1990)
- Crumb (1994)
- Hoop Dreams (1994)
- The Celluloid Closet (1995)
- American Movie (1999)
- Fahrenheit 9/11 (2004)
- Grizzly Man (2005)
- Senna (2010)
- Stories We Tell (2013)
- Blackfish (2013)
- Life Itself (2014)
- Red Army (2014)
- Going Clear (2015)
- Cameraperson (2016)
- Quest (2017)
- Jane (2017)
- Won't You Be My Neighbor? (2018)
- They Shall Not Grow Old (2018)
- Apollo 11 (2019)
- Boys State (2020)

== Documentaries with wins or nominations in other categories ==
Though Academy rules do not expressly preclude documentaries from being nominated in other competitive categories, documentaries are typically considered ineligible for nominations in categories that presume the work is fictitious, including Best Production Design, Best Costume Design, and acting. To date, no documentaries have been nominated for Best Picture, or Best Director. The Quiet One was nominated for Best Story and Screenplay.

No documentary feature has yet been nominated for Best Picture, although Chang was nominated in the "Unique and Artistic Production" category at the 1927/28 awards.

At the 3rd Academy Awards, prior to the introduction of a documentary category, With Byrd at the South Pole won the award for Best Cinematography, becoming the first documentary both to be nominated for and win an Oscar. 1952's Navajo would become the first film nominated for both Best Documentary and Best Cinematography.

Woodstock was the first documentary to be nominated for Best Film Editing while Hoop Dreams was the second (although it was, controversially, not nominated for Best Documentary Feature). Woodstock is also the only documentary to receive a nomination for Best Sound.

Honeyland became the first documentary to be nominated for both Best International Feature Film and Best Documentary Feature. The following year, Collective would accomplish the same double nomination. Prior to this, Waltz with Bashir became the first documentary and first animated film nominated for Best International Feature Film, although it was not nominated for Best Documentary Feature. The Danish-language animated documentary Flee was later nominated for Best International Feature, Best Documentary Feature, and Best Animated Feature, the first film to accomplish this feat.

Twelve documentaries have received nominations for Best Original Song: Mondo Cane (for Riz Ortolani and Nino Oliviero's "More"), An Inconvenient Truth (for Melissa Etheridge's "I Need to Wake Up", the only nominee from a documentary to win), Chasing Ice (for J. Ralph's "Before My Time"), Racing Extinction (for Ralph and Anohni's "Manta Ray"), Jim: The James Foley Story (for Ralph and Sting's "The Empty Chair"), Glen Campbell: I'll Be Me (for Glen Campbell and Julian Raymond's "I'm Not Gonna Miss You"), The Hunting Ground (for Lady Gaga and Diane Warren's "Til It Happens To You"), RBG (for Warren's "I'll Fight"), American Symphony (for Jon Batiste and Dan Wilson's "It Never Went Away"), Elton John: Never Too Late (for Elton John's "Never Too Late"), Diane Warren: Relentless (for Warren's "Dear Me") and Viva Verdi! (for Nicholas Pike's "Sweet Dreams of Joy").

Documentaries nominated for their scores include This is Cinerama, White Wilderness (which also won for Documentary Feature), Let It Be, and Birds Do It, Bees Do It.

Five documentary filmmakers have received honorary Oscars: Pete Smith, William L. Hendricks, D. A. Pennebaker, Frederick Wiseman, and Agnès Varda.

== See also ==
- BAFTA Award for Best Documentary
- Directors Guild of America Award for Outstanding Directing – Documentaries
- Producers Guild of America Award for Best Documentary Motion Picture
- Critics' Choice Documentary Awards
- IDA Documentary Awards
- Cinema Eye Honors Awards
