= Helen Eisenman =

Austrian-born American film subtitler

Helen Milsted Eisenman (June 19, 1928 – May 26, 2017) was an Austrian-born American feature film subtitler who worked from the 1960s to the 1990s, becoming one of the best-known subtitlers in the United States. She has been referred to as the 'Queen of Subtitlers'.

== Career ==
Eisenman was born in 1928 in Austria to a Jewish family who had been shoemakers going back several generations. She fled Austria as a child with her family in 1937. The family moved to Italy, France, Portugal and eventually settled in New York in 1940. She worked in radio and film production before beginning to work as a subtitler in the 1960s. She went into semi-retirement in the 1990s, working part of the time in her Manhattan office and spending summers with her dog on Long Island.

In the course of her career Eisenman worked on the subtitles of over 300 films. She speaks English, German, French, Italian, Portuguese and Spanish. She subtitled films shot in other languages as well, including Dutch, Danish, Chinese and Japanese, by editing the raw translations and turning them into subtitles. She worked on films by many eminent European directors including Pedro Almodóvar and Éric Rohmer. She worked closely with Louis Malle, subtitling his films Au revoir les enfants, Le souffle au coeur and Milou en Mai. She subtitled a number of Oscar-winning and Oscar-nominated films including Babette's Feast, Belle Époque, The Restless Conscience: Resistance to Hitler Within Germany 1933-1945 and Women on the Verge of a Nervous Breakdown.

In interviews Eisenman tended to be pragmatic about translation: "'The audience should be looking at the action, not reading. [...] Our job isn't that of the literary translator. Our job is to give the Cliff's Notes to a movie.'' In another interview she was quoted as saying "You're looking for clarity. [...] You don't need to send telegrams, condense everything into two words. You try to get the flavor of everything within the limits of what you can show.'" "The audience should not have to figure out the subtitles. If they do, you've lost your audience. They should be able to think about what's being said." Eisenman also worked on dubbing projects, including the dubbing of the 1985 Argentinian film The Official Story, which won an Academy Award for Best Foreign Language Film.

== Films subtitled by Eisenman ==
1. Zouzou (Marc Allégret, 1934)
2. Princesse Tam-Tam (Edmond T. Gréville, 1935)
3. We the Living (Goffredo Alessandrini, 1942)
4. Nights of Cabiria (Federico Fellini, 1957)
5. Black Lizard (Kinji Fukasaku, 1968) [1985 rerelease]
6. Murmur of the Heart (Louis Malle, 1971)
7. La Rue Cases-Nègres (Euzhan Palcy, 1983)
8. The Fourth Man (Paul Verhoeven, 1983)
9. Jean de Florette (Claude Berri, 1986)
10. Au revoir les enfants (Louis Malle, 1987)
11. Babette's Feast (Gabriel Axel, 1987)
12. Women on the Verge of a Nervous Breakdown (Pedro Almodóvar, 1988)
13. Europa Europa (Agnieszka Holland, 1990)
14. Ju Dou (Zhang Yimou, 1990)
15. Milou en Mai (Louis Malle, 1990)
16. Raise the Red Lantern (Zhang Yimou, 1991)
17. Belle Époque (Fernando Trueba, 1992)
18. Like Water for Chocolate (Alfonso Arau, 1992)
19. The Restless Conscience: Resistance to Hitler Within Germany 1933-1945 (Hava Kohav Beller, 1992)
20. Faraway, So Close! (Wim Wenders, 1993)
21. Picture Bride (Kayo Hatta, 1994)
22. Men with Guns (John Sayles, 1997)

== Interviews featuring Eisenman ==
1. "Eisenman on subtitles: after words, timing is everything." The Hollywood Reporter 19, #316, 21 February 1991, pp. 14, 24
2. Hillel Italie, "Movie Subtitler Has To Consider Language Subtleties, Timing, Space". In Albuquerque Journal, 11 March 1991, p. 12 (AP copy syndicated to various newspapers)
3. Judith Shulevitz, "Subtitles Have the Last Word in Foreign Films". The New York Times, 7 June 1992, p.
4. Anna Bray. "Queen of subtitlers: The invisible Oscar contender". The Wall Street Journal, 17 February 1994.
5. Carrie Rickey, "Not Lost in Translation. The Folks Who Write Film Subtitles Don't Expect Prizes." The Philadelphia Inquirer, 3 March 1999
