= The Silent Revolution =

The Silent Revolution may refer to:

- The Silent Revolution (1977), a book and a sociological concept by Ronald Inglehart
- The Silent Revolution (1972 film), documentary
- The Silent Revolution (2018 film), German film
- Quiet Revolution, a period in Québécois history
- Secularism in the Republic of Ireland has also been termed "Quiet Revolution" and compared to the one in Quebec.
