= 1942 Academy Awards =

1942 Academy Awards may refer to:

- 14th Academy Awards, the Academy Awards ceremony that took place in 1942
- 15th Academy Awards, the 1943 ceremony honoring the best in film for 1942
