= Battle of Berlin (disambiguation) =

Battle of Berlin can refer to:

- Battle of Berlin, the final strategic offensives of the European Theatre of World War II
- Battle of Berlin (air), the bombing campaign on Berlin by the Royal Air Force (RAF) from November 1943 to March 1944
- 1757 raid on Berlin, an occupation of Berlin by the Army of the Holy Roman Empire during the Seven Years' War
- Raid on Berlin, a 1760 occupation of Berlin by Austrian and Russian forces during the Seven Years' War
- Fall of Berlin (1806), a battle between France and Prussia in the War of the Fourth Coalition

Films

- Battle of Berlin (film), a 1973 West German documentary film directed by Franz Baake and Jost von Morr
- The Fall of Berlin (film), a 1950 two-part Soviet film directed by Mikheil Chiaureli.
