= World and Time Enough =

1994 romantic comedy-drama by Eric Mueller

- Video cover
- Directed by: Eric Mueller
- Written by: Eric Mueller
- Produced by: Julie Hartley; Andrew Peterson; David Haugland; Emily Stevens
- Starring: Gregory Giles; Matt Guidry; Kraig Swartz
- Cinematography: Kyle Bergersen
- Edited by: Laura Stokes
- Music by: Eugene Huddleston
- Distributed by: 1 in 10 Films; Strand Releasing
- Release date: 1994
- Running time: 90 minutes
- Language: English
- Budget: $60,000

World and Time Enough is a 1994 independent gay-themed romantic comedy-drama written and directed by Eric Mueller and starring Gregory Giles, Matt Guidry, and Kraig Swartz. The film was Mueller's directorial debut.

== Cast ==
- Matt Guidry as Mark
- Gregory G. Giles as Joey
- Kraig Swartz as David
- Peter Macon as Mike
- Bernadette Sullivan as Marie
- John Patrick Marin as Mr. Quincy
- Adam Mikelson as Young Mark
- Kathleen Fuller as Mrs. Quincy

== Plot ==
Narrated by their friend David (Swartz), World and Time Enough is the story of Mark (Guidry) and Joey (Giles). Mark is an HIV-positive art student who creates temporary "sculptures" on topics including AIDS, abortion, and the Bush economy. Joey works as a garbage collector, picking up trash along the roadways. He sometimes brings home interesting items that he finds on the job.

Mark's mother was killed when he was a child, in a freak accident in a church when a large falling cross crushed her. Since that day, his father has been obsessed with building model cathedrals. Mark and his father are somewhat distant and out of touch, so Mark reaches out to him by phone, leaving messages on his father's answering machine. Unknown to Mark, his father has died alone in his home, but hasn't yet been discovered.

Joey's relationship with his adoptive parents is also strained because of his father's issues with Joey's homosexuality. Although he remains close with his sister, Joey feels the need to seek out his birth parents through the adoption social service agency.

Mark discovers his father's body, and, in his grief, he assumes his father's obsession with cathedral building. Rather than a model, however, Mark begins work on a full-size cathedral in a local open field.

Joey learns the identity of his birth parents, but also learns that they have died. He visits their gravesite and says the things there that he would have told them while they were alive.

Mark has a vision of his father, who tells him he's making a mistake and to go home. Mark feverishly climbs the scaffolding and falls off it to the ground. Joey discovers him there.

Later, together, out of the scaffolds, surviving bits of Mark's sculptures and the things Joey's gathered, they build their own "cathedral."

== Production ==
Mueller wrote the screenplay in 1991. The film includes semi-autobiographical elements, as Mueller is a Minneapolis native who was also adopted.

It was filmed on location in Edina and Minneapolis, Minnesota. The film was made with grants from the National Endowment for the Arts, the American Film Institute, and a local film organization. The final budget was about $60,000. The film was completed hours before its premiere at the 1994 San Francisco festival, with the negative cutter hand-delivering the print to the Castro Theater.

== Release ==
The film screened at the San Francisco Lesbian & Gay International Film Festival on June 21, 1994. It opened theatrically in New York on September 1, 1995, at the Quad Cinema.

== Reception ==
The film received mixed reviews from critics. Variety called it "modestly winning" and praised the "camera-ready looks and charm" of the lead actors, though the review noted issues with tone and story development. The New York Times gave the film a negative review, with critic Stephen Holden describing it as "muddled" and "overloaded with symbolism." Reviewers also noted that the LGBTQ+ film had 2 heterosexual actors playing romantic leads.

== Awards ==
Year	Award	Category	Result	Ref.
1994	San Francisco International Lesbian & Gay Film Festival	Audience Award for Best Feature	Won	
