= Irwin Rosten =

American film producer

Irwin Rosten (September 10, 1924 – May 23, 2010) was an American documentary filmmaker who also produced several hour-long documentaries for television. He is best known for his 1975 film The Incredible Machine. He was twice nominated for an Academy Award and won an Emmy Award for the documentary Mysteries of the Mind.

Rosten was born on September 10, 1924, in Brooklyn. He began his career as a documentary filmmaker during the 1950s with the DuMont Television Network, where he was manager of news and public affairs. He moved to Los Angeles in 1954, where he produced the 1958 documentary Thou Shalt Not Kill for station KNXT about capital punishment. He was hired by KTLA in 1956, where his documentaries included the 1963 Splt Image about internal television programming produced by patients at Camarillo State Mental Hospital. At KTLA, Rosten produced a higholy-regarded half-hour series of commentaries by Bill Stout on topics in the news. The series was titled "Line of Sight."

During the 1960s, he made independent documentaries for the Wolper Organization and at Metro-Goldwyn-Mayer. He produced a number of one-hour nature and wildlife television specials for National Geographic, the last of which he produced in 1991.

Rosten co-wrote the film narration (alongside James Dugan) for Conshelf Adventure (1966), the first film in the documentary TV series The Undersea World of Jacques Cousteau, featuring Jacques Cousteau, Philippe Cousteau, André Laban, Jacques Rollet, Christian Bonnici, Raymond Coll and Yves Omer. In addition to his collaboration with the Cousteau Team, Rosten produced such films as The Wolf Men, his 1969 film about the hunting of timberwolves, and The Incredible Machine (1975), both of which received nominations for the Academy Award for Best Documentary Feature. His 1974 film Birds Do It, Bees Do It was screened at the 1974 Cannes Film Festival. He earned Emmy Awards, a Peabody Award and Writers Guild of America Awards. The Incredible Machine, which included some of the first pictures taken inside the human body and presented on film, ranked as the most-watched program in Public Broadcasting Service until 1982.

Rosten died at age 85 in his Hollywood home on May 23, 2010, due to vascular disease. He was survived by his wife, Marilyn Ryan, as well as by a son, Peter
