= The Hidden World =

1958 film

- Directed by: Robert H. Crandall
- Produced by: Robert Snyder
- Narrated by: Gregory Peck
- Production company: Small World Co.
- Release date: 1958
- Country: United States
- Language: English

The Hidden World is a 1958 American science documentary film produced by Robert Snyder. It was nominated for an Academy Award for Best Documentary Feature.

== See also ==
- List of American films of 1958
