= George Leverett =

American sound engineer (1883–1968)

- Born: February 10, 1883; Oktibbeha County, Mississippi, United States
- Died: March 20, 1968 (aged 85); Hemet, California, United States
- Occupation: Sound engineer
- Years active: 1934-1960

George Leverett (February 10, 1883 – March 20, 1968) was an American sound engineer. He was nominated for an Oscar for Best Special Effects on the film The Black Swan at the 15th Academy Awards.
