= Changing Our Minds: The Story of Dr. Evelyn Hooker =

1992 film

- Directed by: Richard Schmiechen
- Produced by: David Haugland
- Edited by: Nancy Frazen
- Production company: Intrepid Productions
- Distributed by: Frameline Distribution
- Release date: 1992
- Running time: 77 minutes
- Country: United States
- Language: English

Changing Our Minds: The Story of Dr. Evelyn Hooker is a 1992 American documentary film directed by Richard Schmiechen. The film, which chronicles the work of Evelyn Hooker, a psychologist who challenged the then-standard psychological view of homosexuality, was nominated for an Academy Award for Best Documentary Feature.

== See also ==
- Conversion therapy
