= The Black Swan (Sabatini novel) =

1932 novel by Rafael Sabatini

- First edition (UK)
- Author: Rafael Sabatini
- Language: English
- Genre: Historical; Adventure
- Publisher: Hutchinson (UK); Houghton Mifflin (US); McClelland and Stewart (CAN)
- Publication date: 1932
- Publication place: United Kingdom
- Media type: Print
- Text: The Black Swan online

The Black Swan is a 1932 British historical adventure novel by the Anglo-Italian writer Rafael Sabatini. Like the author's earlier Captain Blood, it focuses on piracy in the seventeenth century Caribbean.

== Plot ==
When Priscilla Harradine travels back to England accompanied by the rather dull Major Sands, she has no cause to expect her journey will be anything other than uneventful. But also on board the Centaur is Charles de Bernis - a mysterious and intriguing buccaneer. Just as their friendship is beginning to blossom, a dark figure from de Bernis' past emerges to propel them into a thrilling and perilous adventure, taking them right to the heart of pirate life.

== Film adaptation ==
In 1942 the novel served as the basis of the Hollywood film The Black Swan starring Tyrone Power and Maureen O'Hara.

== Bibliography ==
- Goble, Alan. The Complete Index to Literary Sources in Film. Walter de Gruyter, 1999.
