= Richard Kotuk =

American journalist

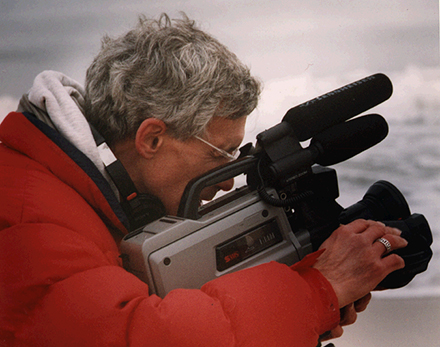
- Kotuk on Main Beach, East Hampton (village), New York in the winter of 1996
- Born: November 23, 1943; New York City, New York, U.S.
- Died: February 10, 1998 (aged 54)
- Education: New York University; The New School
- Occupations: Journalist, producer, documentary filmmaker
- Years active: 1965–1998

Richard Kotuk (November 23, 1943 – February 10, 1998) was an American journalist, producer and documentary filmmaker. He directed and produced Travis, a 1998 documentary film for which he won a George Foster Peabody Award. He was also the producer of the WNET news programs Bill Moyers Journal and The 51st State. His works are notable for their connection to the downtrodden especially in and around New York areas.

== Early life and education ==
Richard Kotuk grew up in New York City. He attended New York University and graduated in 1964 with a B.A. in English and minors in Journalism and Spanish. While a student at New York University, he won the New York University Fiction Writing Award. In 1965, he completed The Writer's Workshop graduate program at The State University of Iowa. In 1978, he graduated with an M.A. in Media Studies from The New School for Social Research.

== Advertising career ==
Kotuk began his career in advertising. From 1965 to 1968, he worked as a Print and Television Copywriter and Producer for Grey Advertising, Ted Bates (advertising firm) and Ogilvy & Mather. His photography was featured in the Street Kids exhibit at New-York Historical Society.

== Writing career ==
For the next three years, he focused on his writing career. He became a feature writer for The Village Voice. Alongside, he worked as a documentary films writer for the National Educational Television's The Great American Dream Machine. He also wrote for the TV Anti-Drug Abuse Campaign for Ad Council and the Federal Government. In addition, he wrote and produced television and radio pieces for the Odyssey House, a treatment facility for drug addicts. He also had a short story titled Steve published as a part of the 1972 Bobbs-Merrill Company anthology, Survival Prose.

In 1973, he became a writer and director for television projects at the Children's Aid Society. From June to September 1973, he produced, wrote and directed an environmental-ecology series for the United Nations film departments titled Man Builds/ Man Destroys.

In 1974, he produced and directed television and radio projects with E.G. Marshall for Cancer Care, Inc. That same year, he also became a writer for television spots for the New York Addiction Services Agency.

== Teaching career ==
In 1975, Kotuk expanded his career to teaching. He became a Director of and Instructor for The Educational Broadcasting Corporation's Television Training Workshop in Film and Videotape Production program for minority students at WNET.

From 1977 to 1979, Kotuk taught several courses in the M.A. program for Media Studies at The New School for Social Research, which included: Media and American Culture, Documentary Film/ Video and Television, and Investigative Reporting in association with the National Academy of Television Arts and Sciences.

From 1984 to 1992, he worked as a professor of Broadcast and Print Journalism at Columbia University Graduate School of Journalism. He also served as an Executive Producer for student Documentary & News Programming.

In 1993, he served as a visiting professor of Television, Film & Communication Studies at Ramapo College.

== Television and film career ==
Kotuk's works are notable for their connection to the downtrodden, especially in and around New York areas. He also did not timid around touchy subjects and visuals. These qualities are consistently reflected in his documentary films and broadcast pieces. He had produced, written and directed more than twenty full-length documentary films as well numerous public and cultural affairs broadcasts, special reports and magazine pieces.

Travis (1998), a documentary about an eight-year-old boy from the Bronx who is struggling with full blown HIV/AIDS, won several awards including the prestigious Peabody Award.

He spent eight years with WNET in New York as a senior producer and writer for Bill Moyers' Journal as well as a producer, reporter, and director of national and local public and cultural affairs and documentary broadcasts for The 51st State. He also worked as a producer for CBS Reports for five years. His documentary films won numerous awards and honors. Children of Darkness (1983), which explored the lack of proper mental health care for seriously emotionally disturbed children in America, received four Emmys and was nominated for an Academy Award for Best Feature Length Documentary. Kotuk and Ara Chekmayan, the film's co-producer and co-writer, faced some challenges in trying to gain permission to shoot at certain locations. The New York State Office of Mental Health denied them access to film at South Beach Psychiatric Center on Staten Island. To get around that, Kotuk and Chekmayan hid the identities of individuals who were willing to speak with them and they also shot with a hidden camera.

== Awards ==
Kotuk's works earned numerous awards which included an Academy Awards nomination, thirteen Emmy awards, The National Brotherhood Award, a Guggenheim Memorial Fellowship in Film Making in 1978, two first-place Associated Press Broadcasters Awards, two Broadcast Media Awards and The Community Service Program Award. He also won a Broadcast Industry Award presented by San Francisco State University and a Certificate of Merit from National Catholic Association for Broadcasters.

== Death ==
On February 10, 1998, Kotuk died after suffering a heart attack. A couple of months after his death, Travis, a documentary film he directed and produced, won a George Foster Peabody Award. His sister along with Travis Jefferies came on stage to receive the award on his behalf.

== Filmography ==
Year	Title	Credited as				Awards
Year	Title	Producer	Director	Reporter	Writer	Awards
1973	Help! The Vocational School Rip Off	Yes				
1974	The 51st State: The Emergency Room	Yes				
1974	The 51st State: COPS	Yes		Yes		18th Annual New York Emmy award for Outstanding Achievement in Informational Feature Reporting Within a Regularly Scheduled News Program
1974	The 51st State: The Occupant In The Single Room	Yes				19th Annual New York Emmy Award for Outstanding Documentary Program
Info n/a	The 51st State-Fordham: Community In Change	Yes		Yes		
Info n/a	The 51st State: Camp LaGuardia			Yes		
1975	The 51st State: The Battered Children	Yes				19th Annual New York Emmy Award for Outstanding Documentary Program
Info n/a	GI Junkies: The Forgotten Veterans			Yes		
1976	Bill Moyers Journal-Rosedale: The Way It Is	Yes				National Brotherhood Award from the National Conference of Christians and Jews
Info n/a	The 51st State: Mark Twain			Yes		
Info n/a	The 51st State: The Singing Bus Driver	Yes		Yes		
Info n/a	The Hidden Hamptons			Yes		
1983	Children of Darkness	Yes		Yes	Yes	The 56th Academy Awards for Best Documentary Feature (nominated)
1998	Travis (feature length documentary)	Yes	Yes		Yes	George Foster Peabody Award (1998) 1998 Eastman Kodak Award, DoubleTake Documentary Film Festival (1998) - first place. Best Health Awareness Documentary, New York International Independent Film & Video Festival (1998) Christopher Award (1999) - Writing
