= The Grain That Built a Hemisphere =

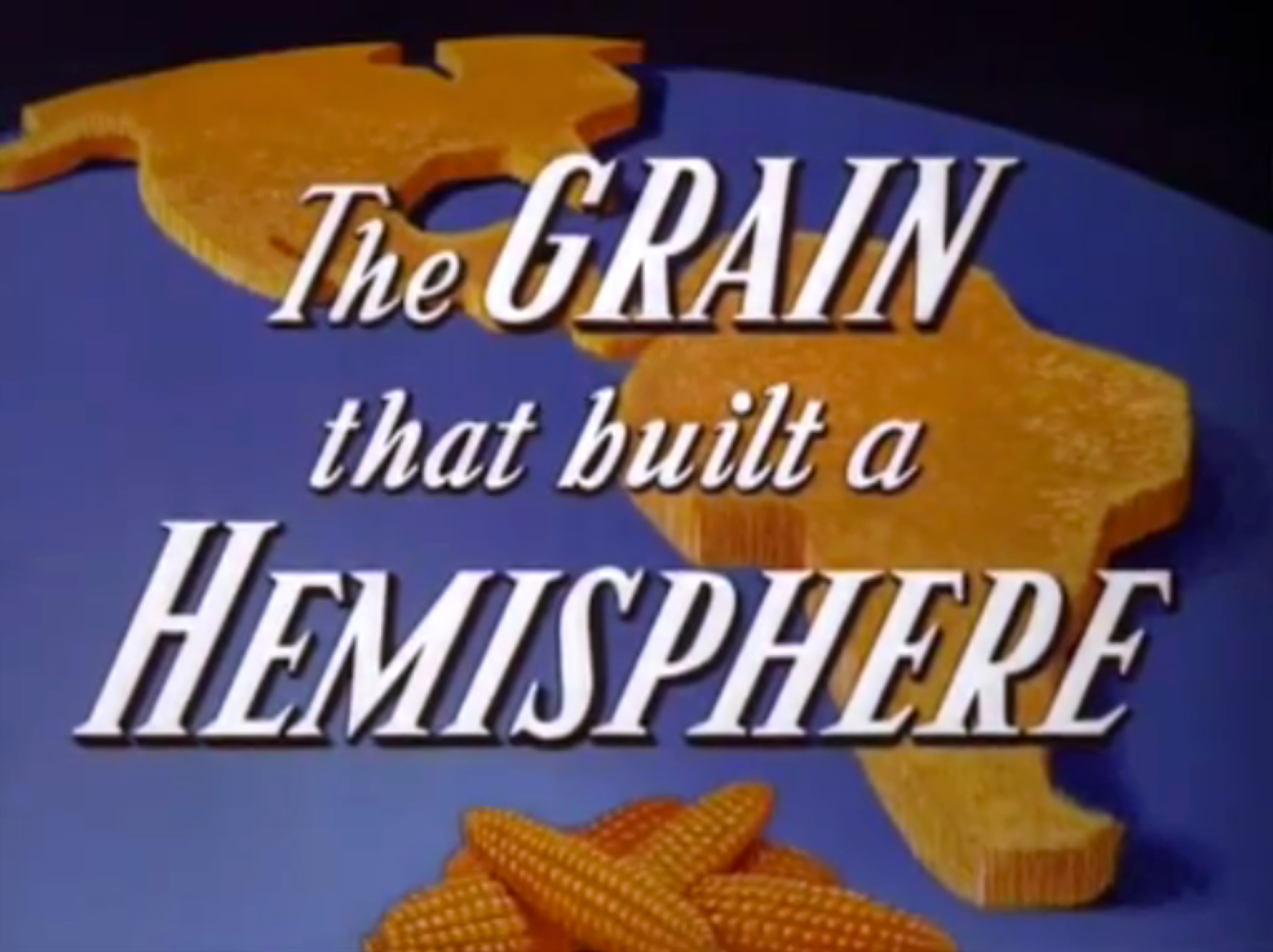
- Intertitle
- Directed by: Bill Justice; Bill Roberts
- Produced by: Office of the Coordinator of Inter-American Affairs; Walt Disney
- Music by: Edward H. Plumb
- Production company: Walt Disney Productions
- Distributed by: RKO Radio Pictures
- Release date: January 4, 1943
- Running time: 11 minutes
- Country: United States
- Language: English

The Grain That Built a Hemisphere is a 1943 short animated propaganda film about corn produced by Walt Disney for the Office of the Coordinator of Inter-American Affairs. It was nominated for an Academy Award for Best Documentary in 1943.

The Grain That Built a Hemisphere

== Bibliography ==
- Shale, Richard (1982). Donald Duck joins up: the Walt Disney Studio during World War II, Pages 80-3424 Volume 16 of Studies in cinema. Ann Arbor: UMI Research Press. ISBN 978-0-8357-1310-8.

== See also ==
- List of Allied propaganda films of World War II
- World War II and American animation
