= David Haugland =

- Occupations: producer, director, and production manager
- Notable work: Changing Our Minds: The Story of Dr. Evelyn Hooker (1992)

David Haugland is an American producer, director, and production manager. He was nominated for the for Academy Award for Best Documentary Feature Film for Changing Our Minds: The Story of Dr. Evelyn Hooker (1992) at the 65th Academy Awards.

== Career ==
He co-produced The Portrait (1993) and produced Changing Our Minds: The Story of Dr. Evelyn Hooker (1992). He co-produced World and Time Enough (1994), produced Requiem for My Mother (2001), and The Oscar Legacy. His works include documentaries, music videos, nature programs, television movies, and dramatic feature films made in the U.S., Latin America, South America, and China. He also served as the President of the International Documentary Association.

== Changing Our Minds: The Story of Dr. Evelyn Hooker (1992) ==
Changing Our Minds: The Story of Dr. Evelyn Hooker is one of the most successful and impactful films of his career. This is a historical documentary directed by Oscar-winner Richard Schiechen and produced by David Haugland. The subject of this documentary is homosexuality, the psychology of homosexuality, and gay and lesbian people.

It portrays the life of a woman named Dr. Hooker, who discovered that homosexuals were not "sick" through research (1950s), which was very controversial. This discovery surprised the psychiatric community and culminated in a major victory for gay rights. In 1974, her studies and gay activism forced the American Psychiatric Association to remove homosexuality from its official manual of mental disorders.

The genre of this film is documentary, biography, and history. The narrator was Patrick Stewart. The writer of this story was James Harrison. This is based in the United States and is a black-and-white film. This documentary was nominated for an Academy Award for Best Documentary Feature.

== Personal life ==
The film producer Richard Schmiechen was Haugland's life companion and business partner. The couple collaborated on Changing Our Minds together. Schmiechen died aged 45 in Midway Hospital of complications from AIDS.
