= Robert Snyder (filmmaker) =

American film director (1916–2004)

- Born: January 15, 1916; Brooklyn, New York
- Died: March 21, 2004 (aged 88); Pacific Palisades, California
- Occupation: Filmmaker
- Spouse: Allegra Fuller Snyder
- Children: 2

Robert Snyder (January 16, 1916 – March 21, 2004) was a documentary filmmaker who won an Academy Award in 1950 as producer of The Titan: Story of Michelangelo.

== Biography ==
Robert Snyder was born in Brooklyn, New York, on January 16, 1916. He married Allegra Fuller, the daughter of Buckminster Fuller, professor emeritus and former chairwoman of the dance department at University of California at Los Angeles. They had a son Jaime and a daughter Alexandra.

Snyder won the Academy Award for Best Feature-Length Documentary for The Titan: Story of Michelangelo. It was a German/Swiss film titled Michelangelo: Life of a Titan, first released in 1938 directed by Curt Oertel. Snyder re-edited and shortened the film, adding narration by Fredric March.

Snyder was nominated for a second Academy Award in 1958 for a documentary on insects, The Hidden World, narrated by Gregory Peck. Snyder produced or directed more than a half-dozen biographical documentaries about individuals, including his own father-in-law, futurist Buckminster Fuller. Other subjects included American patron of the arts, poet, publisher, and peace activist Caresse Crosby, author Henry Miller, historians Will and Ariel Durant, Claudio Arrau and cellist Pablo Casals.

His 12-part series, Looking at Modern Art, and Michelangelo: Self-Portrait both appeared on the U.S. Public Broadcasting Service. He died after a lengthy illness in Pacific Palisades, California on March 21, 2004.

== Archive ==
The Academy Film Archive houses the Masters & Masterworks Collection, named after Snyder's production company.

== Works ==
=== As director ===
- Willem de Kooning: Artist (short) 1995
- Michelangelo: A Self Portrait (documentary) 1989
- Claudio Arrau: A Life in Music (documentary) 1978
- Ruth Asawa: Of Forms & Growth (documentary short) 1978
- Anais Nin Observed (documentary) 1974
- The World of Buckminster Fuller (documentary) 1974
- NBC Experiment in Television (TV series documentary) Episode, Buckminster Fuller on Spaceship Earth (1971)
- The Henry Miller Odyssey (documentary) 1969
- A Glimpse of De Kooning (documentary) 1961
- A Visit with Pablo Casals 1957
- Halfway to Hell (documentary) 1954

=== As producer ===
- Willem de Kooning: Artist (short) (producer) 1995
- The Henry Miller Odyssey (documentary) (producer) 1969
- Bayanihan (documentary) (producer) 1962
- The Hidden World (documentary) (producer) 1958
- The Titan: Story of Michelangelo (documentary) (producer) 1950

=== As actor ===
- Code Name: Heraclitus (TV movie) as MacPherson 1967
- The Twilight Zone (TV series) as electrician Episode, "One More Pallbearer" (1962) ... Electrician (uncredited) 1961
- Outlaws (TV series) as Bundy 1961

=== Crew ===
- Gods of Bali (documentary) (supervisor - 1952 version)

=== Bibliography ===
- This Is Henry, Henry Miller From Brooklyn (non-fiction book) 1974
- Anais Nin Observed: Portrait of the Woman as an Artist (non-fiction book) 1976
- Buckminster Fuller: An Autobiographical Monologue Scenario (biography) 1976

== Awards ==
- Academy Awards

== Added information ==
Snyder's website
