= Heather Artinian =

American lawyer

Heather Artinian (born 1993) is a Deaf American lawyer who was the subject of the documentary Sound and Fury when she was a child. Although her parents initially opposed letting her get the cochlear implant, they eventually let her get one in 2002, and she went on to attend a mainstream school.

== Early life ==
Born to Deaf parents and fluent in American Sign Language, she was heavily featured in the 2000 documentary Sound and Fury, which highlighted the controversy surrounding cochlear implants. In the film, she asks her parents for a cochlear implant since she wants to be able to hear and speak. Her family took the time to research it, visiting a cochlear implant center, an oral school, and meeting with recipients. Heather's mother, Nita, even began to consider getting an implant for herself. While at first she believed that it wouldn't help her speech much due to her age, after seeing her children's experience with them, years later Nita went on to also become a cochlear implant user.

Heather's hearing grandparents strongly supported letting her get the implant, with her grandmother helping her practice her speech throughout the film. With growing concerns that the implant would distance Heather from Deaf culture and her family, the family chose to move to Maryland so that she could attend the Maryland School for the Deaf, one of the best schools for the Deaf in the country. In Maryland, she grew up with Deaf friends, and grew to feel that a cochlear implant would be unnecessary. At age seven, she developed an interest in becoming a lawyer.

== Cochlear implant ==
When her family returned to New York, she decided to ask for a cochlear implant again, since most people in the area did not know how to sign unlike where she lived in Maryland, and she had learned about her father being denied a promotion because of his deafness. With her grandparents putting additional pressure on her parents to let her get the implant, her parents let her get it, and later her mother and brothers got implanted too. She received her first cochlear implant in September 2002 when she was nine years old, and began intensive speech therapy afterwards, making significant progress and soon switching to a mainstream school where she was the only deaf student. Three years later, she appeared in a follow-up documentary about her life with the implant – Sound and Fury: 6 Years Later.

== Career ==
After graduating from the mainstream school with high grades she attended Georgetown University, which she graduated from in 2015 before going on to attend Harvard Law School, where she received a JD in 2018. While at Georgetown she gave a TEDx talk about bridging the Deaf world and the hearing world. After graduating from Harvard she got a job as a lawyer at Latham & Watkins.
