= The Incredible Machine (film) =

1975 film

- Directed by: Irwin Rosten
- Written by: Irwin Rosten
- Produced by: Irwin Rosten; Alex Pomasanoff; Dennis B. Kane
- Narrated by: E. G. Marshall
- Edited by: Hyman Kaufman
- Music by: Billy Goldenberg
- Production companies: Wolper Productions; National Geographic Society
- Distributed by: PBS
- Release date: October 28, 1975
- Running time: 59 minutes
- Country: United States
- Language: English

The Incredible Machine is a 1975 American documentary film directed by Irwin Rosten and Ed Spiegel. It was nominated for an Academy Award for Best Documentary Feature. E. G. Marshall narrated the film, which was produced by Rosten, together with Dennis B. Kane and Alex Pomasanoff.

== Reception ==
The Incredible Machine presented some of the first pictures taken inside the human body, including some of the earliest film that medical researchers had taken inside the human digestive tract and bloodstream. It ranked as the most-watched program in Public Broadcasting Service until 1982, when it was overtaken by The Sharks. Rosten's collaborator Nicolas Noxon described the "extraordinary impact" that the film had as a National Geographic special, noting that it was "groundbreaking for its time" and "opened people's eyes to what could be done with a documentary". The New York Times reviewer John J. O'Connor cited the film's ability to allow PBS to compete with the major networks, saying that "commercial television should now be reeling from the success of [the] National Geographic documentary", which garnered 36% of the total television audience in the New York City area when it was shown on WNET Channel 13.

Rosten was criticized by some for using film that had been taken inside monkeys and rabbits. The New York Times noted criticism that viewers had been led to believe that the film was composed entirely of shots taken inside the human body, while nearly 5% was actually taken inside animals for details of the lungs, blood circulation and the reproductive system. Rosten had used film of human subjects wherever possible but that when "it was impossible to get inside the body we used film of mammals that would be exact representations of what we wanted to show". The National Geographic Society had been informed by Rosten that animal footage was included, but a disclaimer was not included in the film.
