= Children of Darkness =

1983 film

- Produced by: Ara Chekmayan; Richard Kotuk
- Narrated by: Peter Thomas
- Cinematography: Chuck Levey
- Edited by: Ara Chekmayan
- Release date: May 4, 1983
- Running time: 57 minutes
- Country: United States
- Language: English

Children of Darkness is a 1983 American documentary film on PBS produced by Ara Chekmayan and Richard Kotuk. It was nominated for an Academy Award for Best Documentary Feature. It made its television debut on May 4, 1983.

The documentary focuses on mentally ill and emotionally troubled children and young adults living in various private and public residences in the United states. The film focuses on state institutions, such as the Eastern State School in Pennsylvania, the Élan School in Poland, Maine; Sagamore Children's Centre in Long Island, and South Beach psychiatric hospital in New York. It features interviews with various parents whose children died under suspicious circumstances while in custody. Presented alongside these are interviews with various staff members who work with the disabled children, emphasising the staff's awareness of their inability to cure them.

One of the drugs that caused patient deaths in the South Beach hospital is mesoridazine, which was withdrawn from the United States market in 2004 due to dangerous heart side effects. The Élan School closed in 2011 due to criticism of its alleged treatment of patients, including making children fight one another in a ring as punishment.
