= The Wolf Men =

1969 film

- Produced by: Irwin Rosten
- Narrated by: James Coburn
- Production company: MGM
- Distributed by: NBC
- Release date: 1969
- Country: United States
- Language: English

The Wolf Men (also known as Wolves and the Wolf Men) is a 1969 documentary film produced by Irwin Rosten. It was produced for the GE Monogram documentary series on NBC. It was nominated for an Academy Award for Best Documentary Feature.

== See also ==
- List of American films of 1969
