= Desert Wonderland =

1942 film

- Directed by: Russ Shields; Jack Kuhne
- Distributed by: Twentieth Century-Fox
- Release date: 1942
- Running time: 9 minutes
- Country: United States
- Language: English

Desert Wonderland is a 1942 American short documentary film directed by Russ Shields and Jack Kuhne exploring the Grand Canyon. It was nominated for an Academy Award at the 15th Academy Awards for Best Short Subject (One-Reel). The film was preserved by the Academy Film Archive in 2016.
