= Sound and Fury (2000 film) =

2000 documentary film by Josh Aronson

- DVD cover
- Directed by: Josh Aronson
- Produced by: Josh Aronson; Jackie Roth; Julie Sacks; Roger Weisberg
- Edited by: Ann Collins
- Production company: Public Policy Productions
- Distributed by: Artistic License Films
- Release date: 2000
- Running time: 80 minutes
- Country: United States
- Language: English

Sound and Fury is a documentary film released in 2000 about two American families with young deaf children and their conflict over whether or not to give their children cochlear implants; surgically implanted devices that may improve their ability to hear but may threaten their Deaf identity.

== Accolades ==
The film won the National Board of Review Freedom of Expression Award and was nominated for an Academy Award for Best Documentary Feature.

== Synopsis ==
The film follows the Artinian extended family with deafness through three generations over a year and a half, focusing on two brothers — Peter Artinian who is Deaf and Chris Artinian, who is hearing — and their wives and children. Chris and Mari Artinian (who is a Child of Deaf Adult) discover that one of their newborn twins is deaf. They begin to research the cochlear implant and its advantages and disadvantages. Concurrently Heather, Peter and Nita's oldest child, starts asking for an implant as well. The brothers, along with grandparents on both sides, become embroiled in a bitter argument over the importance of deafness, the best form of education for their children and the controversy of cochlear implants for young children. Peter and his wife Nita fear losing a child to the "hearing world" and her potential abandonment of Deaf culture. They were pleased with Maryland and decided to move there and forget the implant. Chris and Mari chose to have cochlear implant surgery performed on their infant, Peter.

== Follow up ==
In the follow-up documentary Sound and Fury: 6 Years later, Heather is twelve years old and she, her two Deaf siblings, her mother, and members of her extended Deaf family have all opted for the implant device. The article summarizing the documentary's events describes her as having clear speech, living in a 'mainstreamed' world, interacting with hearing people, and earning high grades in school. Heather is depicted as moving between the hearing and Deaf worlds comfortably, and embracing Deaf culture as well as having friends who are hearing. Heather is now in her twenties. She graduated from Harvard Law School in 2018.

== Reception ==
=== Critical response ===
Sound and Fury has an approval rating of 96% on review aggregator website Rotten Tomatoes, based on 28 reviews, and an average rating of 8.22/10. The website's critical consensus states, "This documentary presents its opposing views in an even-handed yet emotionally engaging manner. Critics say it will provoke much thought, as well as emotions, in the audience". It also has a score of 85 out of 100 on Metacritic, based on 17 critics, indicating "universal acclaim".

== See also ==
- List of films featuring the deaf and hard of hearing
- Autism Speaks - cure for autism controversy
