= Battle of Berlin (film) =

1973 film

- Directed by: Franz Baake; Jost von Morr
- Produced by: Bengt von zur Mühlen
- Release date: 1973
- Country: West Germany
- Language: German

Battle of Berlin (German: Schlacht um Berlin) is a 1973 West German documentary film directed by Franz Baake and Jost von Morr. It was nominated for an Academy Award for Best Documentary Feature.
