= The Silent Revolution (1972 film) =

1972 film

- Produced by: Eckehard Munck
- Release date: 1972
- Running time: 44 minutes
- Country: West Germany

The Silent Revolution is a 1972 German documentary film about molecular biology. It was nominated for an Academy Award for Best Documentary Feature.
