= Combat Report =

- Produced by: U.S. Army Signal Corps
- Release date: 1942
- Country: United States
- Language: English

Combat Report was a short dramatic propaganda film produced by the U.S. Army Signal Corps in 1942, and shows the anti-submarine efforts of a bombing crew. It was nominated for an Academy Award for Best Documentary Feature in 1942.

== See also ==
- List of Allied propaganda films of World War II
