= Allegra Fuller Snyder =

American dance ethnologist (1927-2021)

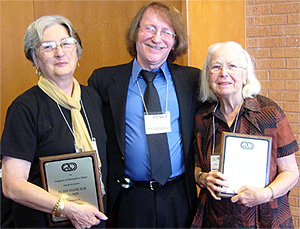
Allegra Fuller Snyder (right) and Elsie Ivancich Dunin (left) after receiving the 2006 CORD Award for Outstanding Leadership in Dance Research from CORD president Ray Miller (center)

Allegra Fuller Snyder (August 28, 1927 – July 11, 2021) was an American dance ethnologist (ethnochoreologist), choreographer, professor, and author specializing in dance and culture. Her research focused on dances among Native American nations, particularly the Yaqui, and on dance among several ethnic groups in Africa and Asia. She was Professor Emerita of dance ethnology from the University of California at Los Angeles (UCLA).

== Family ==
Snyder was the daughter of noted architect and inventor Buckminster Fuller and his wife Anne Hewlett.

== Career ==
Snyder pioneered the field of Dance Ethnography, and defined a dance ethnologist as "...one who is concerned with studying the process of dance in culture." She went on to state that "This field of investigation has been the major focus of my life and work for the last thirty-plus years." She was Director of the Graduate Program in Dance Ethnology at UCLA, as well as chairing the Department of Dance. She retired in 1991. She previously taught at the California Institute of the Arts, and Naropa University.

== Documentaries ==
Snyder also directed several documentaries on dance practices around the world.

== Publications ==
- Securing Our Dance Heritage: Issues in the Documentation and Preservation of Dance., 1999, Council on Library and Information Resources
- ‘Filmed in "Holly-Vision": Hollywood Images of World Dance,’ chapter in Looking Out: Perspectives on Dance and Criticism in a Multicultural World., David Gere, ed. New York: NY, Dance Critics Association, 1995.
