= Conquer by the Clock =

- Directed by: Frederic Ullman Jr., Slavko Vorkapich
- Produced by: Frederic Ullman Jr.
- Cinematography: Larry O'Reilly
- Edited by: John Hoffman
- Music by: Erno Rapee
- Distributed by: RKO Pathé
- Release date: October 27, 1942
- Country: United States
- Language: English

Conquer by the Clock was a short dramatic propaganda film produced by the RKO Pathé in 1942 to encourage wartime industrial production. It was nominated for an Academy Award for Best Documentary Feature in 1943.

== See also ==
- List of Allied propaganda films of World War II
- United States home front during World War II
