= The Price of Victory =

- Directed by: William H. Pine
- Written by: Maxwell Shane
- Produced by: Paramount Pictures, U.S. Office of War Information
- Narrated by: Henry Wallace
- Music by: Daniele Amfitheatrof
- Distributed by: U.S. Office of War Information
- Release date: December 3, 1942
- Running time: 14 minutes
- Country: United States
- Language: English

The Price of Victory is a 1942 short propaganda film produced by Paramount Pictures and the U.S. Office of War Information. It was nominated for an Academy Award for Best Documentary Feature in 1943.

== See also ==
- List of Allied propaganda films of World War II
