= The Restless Conscience: Resistance to Hitler Within Germany 1933–1945 =

1992 film

- Directed by: Hava Kohav Beller
- Written by: Hava Kohav Beller
- Narrated by: John Dildine
- Cinematography: Gábor Bagyoni; Volker Rodde; Martin Schaer
- Edited by: Tonicka Janek; David Rogow; Juliet Weber
- Distributed by: Direct Cinema
- Release date: 1992
- Running time: 113 minutes
- Country: United States
- Language: English

The Restless Conscience: Resistance to Hitler Within Germany 1933–1945 is a 1992 American documentary film directed by Hava Kohav Beller. It was nominated for an Academy Award for Best Documentary Feature.

== Reception ==
Miranda Seymour mentions the film in her book Noble Endeavours. She describes the revelations of this film and how they are featured as "fascinating".

== Biography ==
- Seymour, Miranda (2013). Noble Endeavours – The Life of Two Countries, England and Germany, in Many Stories. London & New York: Simon & Schuster UK. ISBN 978-1-84983-015-7.
