= The 51st State (television program) =

The 51st State was a television news program that was broadcast on WNET. It aired nightly from 1972 to 1973 and then weekly from the fall of 1974 until 1976.
