= A Ship Is Born =

- Directed by: Jean Negulesco
- Written by: Owen Crump
- Produced by: Gordon Hollingshead
- Starring: Knox Manning
- Music by: William Lava
- Production company: U.S. Merchant Marine
- Distributed by: Warner Bros.
- Release date: October 10, 1942
- Running time: 22 minutes
- Country: United States
- Language: English

A Ship Is Born is a 1942 short WWII propaganda film produced by Warner Bros. about the U.S. Merchant Marine. It was nominated for an Academy Award for Best Documentary Feature in 1943.

== See also ==
- List of Allied propaganda films of World War II
