= The Black Swan (film) =

1942 film by Henry King

- Theatrical release poster
- Directed by: Henry King
- Screenplay by: Ben Hecht; Seton I. Miller
- Based on: The Black Swan; 1932 novel by Rafael Sabatini
- Produced by: Robert Bassler
- Starring: Tyrone Power; Maureen O'Hara
- Cinematography: Leon Shamroy
- Edited by: Barbara McLean
- Music by: Alfred Newman
- Color process: Technicolor
- Distributed by: Twentieth Century-Fox Film Corporation
- Release date: December 4, 1942
- Running time: 85 minutes
- Country: United States
- Language: English
- Budget: $1,493,800
- Box office: $2,586,000 (US rentals) $5,727,000 (worldwide)

The Black Swan is a 1942 American swashbuckler Technicolor film directed by Henry King and starring Tyrone Power and Maureen O'Hara. It was based on the 1932 novel of the same title by Rafael Sabatini.

Leon Shamroy won the Academy Award for Best Cinematography, Color.

This was the final film of silent film star Helene Costello.

Although the film revolves around Captain Waring (Tyrone Power) and his ship, that ship is the "Revenge". The title relates to the enemy ship "The Black Swan" belonging to Captain Leech.

== Plot ==
After England and Spain make peace, notorious pirate Henry Morgan decides to reform. As a reward, he is made Governor of Jamaica, with a mandate to rid the Caribbean of his former comrades, by persuasion or force if necessary. He replaces the former governor, Lord Denby, but is not trusted by either the lawful residents or the pirates.

Captain Jamie Waring and his lieutenant, Tom Blue, reluctantly give up their "trade" out of friendship for Morgan, but others of the Pirate Brotherhood, such as Captain Billy Leech and Wogan, refuse to change.

Meanwhile, Waring takes a liking to Denby's daughter, Lady Margaret (Maureen O'Hara), who happens to be inconveniently engaged to an English gentleman, Roger Ingram. As it turns out, her fiancé is secretly providing information about ship sailings to the unrepentant pirates.

The Jamaican assembly is in an uproar about the rogue pirates, so Morgan sends Jamie to track down Leech, but he fails due to Ingram's treachery. The Jamaican assembly votes to impeach Morgan, and Ingram announces he and Margaret will sail to England to inform the King.

Morgan orders Jamie to capture Leech in order to get the head of the Jamaican assembly to vote against him. Jamie prepares to follow Morgan's orders, but as he doesn't want Margaret to marry Ingram he goes by her house and despite her objections, gags her, takes her, and sails off.

The pirate fleet with the Black Swan shows up sailing hard behind him and Jamie's ship is captured by Leech. Jamie pretends that he has run away to join Leech and marry Margaret. Margaret reluctantly goes along with the ruse. Morgan hears of Jamie's "betrayal" and heads off to catch them.

Leech discovers the marriage between Margaret and Jamie is a sham and captures Jamie. Leech takes Jamie's ship to where the other ships are waiting and showers them with cannon fire. During the fight, Jamie escapes and manages to kill Leech in a duel, as Morgan storms aboard.

Morgan is inclined to hang Jamie because he abducted Margaret, but she declares that she accompanied him of her own free will. By now, they have genuinely fallen in love and they kiss. Having been ousted from the governorship, Morgan decides to return to life as a pirate.

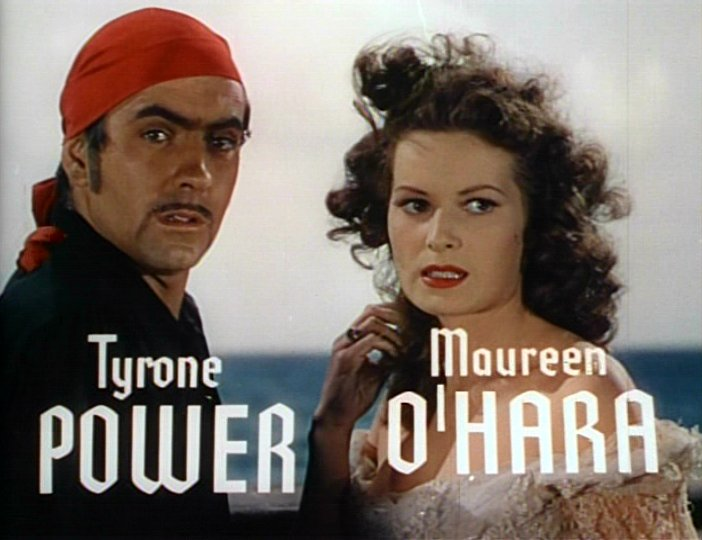
Power and O'Hara in the trailer for The Black Swan (1942)

== Cast ==
- Tyrone Power as Jamie Waring
- Maureen O'Hara as Lady Margaret Denby
- Laird Cregar as Sir Henry Morgan
- Thomas Mitchell as Tom Blue
- George Sanders as Captain Billy Leech
- Anthony Quinn as Wogan
- George Zucco as Lord Denby
- Edward Ashley as Roger Ingram (uncredited)

== Production ==
O'Hara recalled that it was "everything you could want in a lavish pirate picture: a magnificent ship with thundering cannons; a dashing hero battling menacing villains ... sword fights; fabulous costumes ...". She found it exhilarating working with Power, who was renowned for his "wicked sense of humor". O'Hara grew very concerned about one scene in the picture in which she is thrown overboard in her underwear by Power and sent a warning letter home to Ireland in advance. She refused to take her wedding ring off in one scene which resulted in screen adjustments to make it look like a dinner ring.

== Reception ==
The film was a huge hit and made a profit of $2,366,300.

Though the film was praised by critics and is seen as one of the period's most enjoyable adventure films, The New York Times critic thought O'Hara's character lacked depth, commenting that "Maureen O'Hara is brunette and beautiful—which is all the part requires".

The Chicago Tribune was enthusiastic: "Here's another 'escape picture for the cares that do beset you! It's interesting. It's exciting. It's romantic. It's FUN...Never, I thought, had I seen such beautiful coloring! And look at all the he-men in the cast! Woo-woo! Laird Cregar...was the perfect choice for Morgan. He really steals the picture. Which fact does not detract from those that Tyrone Power is fascinating....George Sanders positively immense as the wicked Leech, or Thomas Mitchell a perfect lamb as just a happy go-getter pirate....Maureen O'Hara, gorgeous in technicolor, plays a lady won against her will with skill and enthusiasm."

The review aggregator Rotten Tomatoes reported that 80% of critics have given the film a positive review based on 5 reviews, with an average rating of 7/10.

== Awards ==
Leon Shamroy won an Academy Award for Best Cinematography, while Fred Sersen, Roger Heman Sr., George Leverett were nominated for Best Visual Effects and Alfred Newman was nominated for Best Original Score.

== Home media ==
The DVD version of the film contains commentary by Maureen O'Hara with film historian Rudy Behlmer.
