= Hava Kohav Beller =

American documentary filmmaker

Hava Kohav Beller is a filmmaker primarily known for three documentary films: The Restless Conscience (1991), The Burning Wall (2002), and In The Land of Pomegranates (2018).

== Early life ==
Beller was born in Frankfurt am Main, Germany, and grew up in Geva, Israel. She studied at the Juilliard School, where she studied music, ballet and modern dance.

Hava Beller lives in New York City.

== Career ==
Beller was a dancer and choreographer, and had her own dance company in New York. She acted in off-Broadway productions. From 1979 to 1981 she studied filmmaking with Arnold S. Eagle at the New School for Social Research.

In 1991, after nine years in the making, Beller finished the film The Restless Conscience. The film examines the Nazi terror and those who fought it from within. In 1992, The Restless Conscience was nominated for an Academy Award as Best Documentary Feature. In 1993, Ms. Beller was decorated by then President of Germany Richard von Weizsäcker with the Commander’s Cross of the Order of Merit (Das Grosse Bundesverdienstkreuz). It was screened nationally on PBS and has been on television in over twenty countries worldwide.

The Burning Wall depicts the development of the GDR—its founders and those who opposed it, as it emerged from the ashes of World War II. It charts its political and social evolution through various stages, including the 1953 uprising and the building of the Berlin Wall. Particular attention is paid to the life of Robert Havemann, whose biography threads these episodes together. The film's latter part focuses on the work of the Stasi, with many original interviews with former Stasi discussing their cases and methods, as well as interviews with the subjects of their surveillance.

It premiered at the Berlin Film Festival and the Film Forum in New York. In 2002, the film won the Best Documentary Prize in the Hollywood Film Festival. In 2003, it won Best Documentary The Anchorage Film Festival.

After a 16-year gap, Beller finished a third documentary, about the Palestinian/Israeli conflict, titled In the Land of Pomegranates (2018). It premiered at Lincoln Plaza Cinemas in New York City on January 5, 2018.
