= It's Everybody's War =

1942 film

- Produced by: 1st Motion Pictures Unit, Army Air Forces
- Narrated by: Henry Fonda
- Production company: 20th Century Fox
- Distributed by: Office of War Information
- Release date: November 6, 1942
- Running time: 18 minutes
- Country: United States
- Language: English

It's Everybody's War is a dramatic propaganda short film produced by 20th Century Fox and distributed by the Office of War Information in 1942.

The film is designed to show the chronological effects of the war on a typical American small town. Two years ago they sent their company of the National Guard but didn't think they would actually go to battle. They first get sanguine letters about their training and being stationed in the Philippines without a thought to the possibility of combat. Then the Japanese invade the Philippines. Over winter 1942, one by one, many of the parents get telegrams from the government saying their children have died. People start joining the war effort with bravado, but then slack off, taking days off work and wasting resources, until May 6, 1942, when Corregidor falls and the rest of the company is taken prisoner by the Japanese.

The town then rallies, and more and more people go to work for war industries, go without luxuries to supply more materiel, and buy bonds. The next time that their company goes off to the front, they will have more planes, more tires, and better equipment, and they won't have to surrender.

== See also ==
- List of Allied propaganda films of World War II
- United States home front during World War II
