= Australian Information Service =

Historical Australian government agency

The Australian Information Service (AIS) was one of a series of federal government organisations created to promote the image of Australia, in existence between 1940 and 1996.

First created in 1940, the Australian News and Information Bureau (ANIB) kept its name but expanded its functions when it was moved into the Department of the Interior in 1950. It was renamed in February 1973 to the Australian Information Service, under which name it created a vast collection of photographs now held in the National Archives of Australia.

It was again renamed in 1986, to Promotion Australia, a year later becoming the Australian Overseas Information Service (AOIS). In 1994 the agency became a branch of the Department of Foreign Affairs and Trade (DFAT), renamed the International Public Affairs Branch, before being disbanded in 1996.

== History and functions ==
The Department of Information (DOI) was created in September 1939 under the leadership of J. L. Treloar, responsible for both censorship and disseminating government propaganda during World War II. It was broken up in 1950. The Australian News and Information Bureau (ANIB) was created in 1940 within the DOI on the suggestion of Keith Murdoch, then Director-General of Information, but by the time it was implemented, he had resigned and the Minister for Information, Harry Foll, took charge. ANIB was based in New York City, as its main goal was to inform the United States of Australia's war effort, thereby nurturing and building the relationship between the two countries. A London office was opened in 1944 and one in San Francisco in 1945, as ANIB developed an "overseas publicity" role.

With the breaking up of the DOI in 1950, ANIB was transferred to the Department of the Interior, and expanded its functions to take on much of DOI's work, also taking on many of its staff members. At this time it split into separate Home and Overseas Organisations. The ANIB took on the role of attracting migrants to Australia after the war, painting an attractive image of a country scarcely touched by war and with plenty of space and opportunity. During the Cold War, the bureau's overseas arm became more political hue, pushing the notion that the "Australian way of life" was much better than Communism.

The Australian National Film Board, based in Sydney (also referred to as the Film Division), created in order oversee coordination of government and commercial filmmaking, and to engage film production in the war effort, came under ANIB from 1950 until 1955. (After several further changes over the years, the organisation morphed into Film Australia and then merged into Screen Australia).

From 1950 until at least 1961 it also established and managed "The Colombo Plan" in 1950, an aid scheme for developing countries, which was criticised for being wasteful and poorly managed.

Under the Whitlam Labor government December 1972, ANIB became part of the new Department of the Media, changing its name in February 1973 to the Australian Information Service (AIS), and started focusing on disseminating government information within Australia. ANIB state offices were created in Western Australia and Queensland, and an extensive overseas network was established, including not only offices in North America and Europe, but also Asian cities such as Karachi, New Delhi, Bangkok, Singapore, Kuala Lumpur, Jakarta, Tokyo and Manila.

The AIS was renamed Promotion Australia in 1986, the following year again renamed to the Australian Overseas Information Service (AOIS).

In 1994 the agency became a branch in the Department of Foreign Affairs and Trade (DFAT) known as the International Public Affairs Branch. In 1996 the branch was dissolved.

== Photographs ==
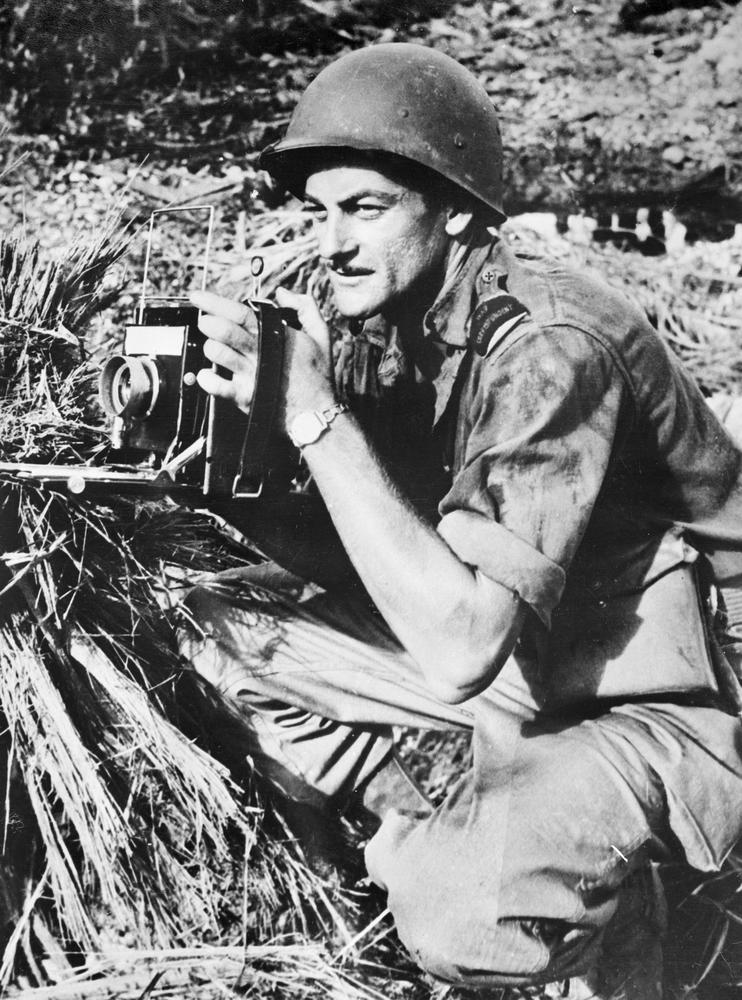
DOI photographer James (Jim) Fitzpatrick in the Philippines, Nov. 1944

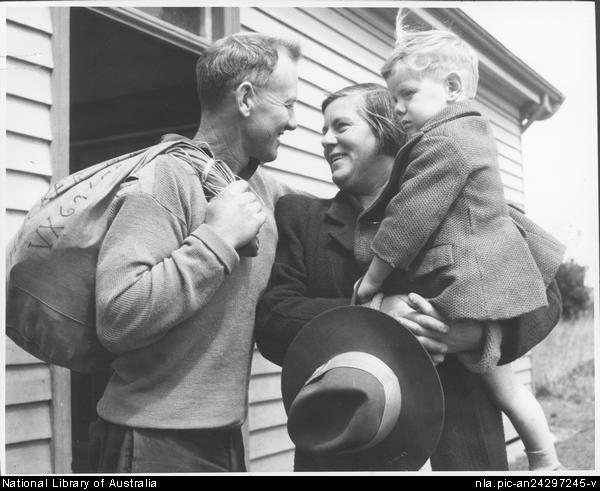
Wartime parting of a family, Drouin, Victoria by Jim Fitzpatrick 1916-

Numerous photographs were created by the department, now held by the National Archives of Australia.

In 1981, two packets of "historical" photographs of a rural Victorian town were returned to Australia by the New York office of the Australian Information Service, showing a small example of the activities of the agency.

The photographs were taken by Jim Fitzpatrick, an official war photographer with the AIS, who was sent in 1944 to document the impact of the war on the population of the dairying town of Drouin. His 88 photographs now make up the Drouin Collection and focus on the town's people as a community and also on a more personal level, somewhat idealised and showing their sacrifices and contributions to the war effort. Fitzpatrick’s assignment was part of an extensive publicity campaign to convince our allies, particularly the Americans, that we were "shouldering our full share of the burdens of war".

An article titled "Small town at war", written by David Stevens, was published in the South West Pacific Annual in December 1944, including 27 of Fitzpatrick's photographs. The publication was produced by the Department of Information and distributed to overseas media editors for free.

Fitzpatrick was also responsible for a series of photographs he took on Biak Island, off Dutch New Guinea, of Japanese warplanes going down in flames in June 1944.
