= Henry Browne, Farmer =

Short propaganda film produced in 1942

- Narrated by: Canada Lee
- Production companies: Republic Pictures; United States Department of Agriculture
- Distributed by: War Activities Committee of the Motion Pictures Industry
- Release date: November 15, 1942
- Running time: 9 minutes
- Country: United States
- Language: English

Henry Browne, Farmer

Henry Browne, Farmer is an American short propaganda film produced in 1942 about African-American contributions to the war effort during World War II. It is narrated by Canada Lee.

The film begins with stock footage of soldiers marching, tanks, and people in the war industries, the narrator noting that we had an army behind the troops in the war industries, and they had an army behind them, American agriculture. The story switches to a day in the life of Henry Browne, farmer; Henry Browne is 38 years old, married with three children. He makes his living off the land. When the sun comes up every member of the family has their chores to do. Little Henry goes to milk the cow, this is the first year they had a cow. His sister goes to feed the chickens, which are good layers, and the ones that are not are good "eaters". Mrs. Brown tends the garden. There is little in the garden that will be sold, the narrator says, but much that will be eaten.

Henry looks out into his field. He is not planting what he usually plants, but peanuts like the government man asked. The peanuts will create peanut oil, contributing to the war effort. Henry Brown does not have a tractor, but only two mules.

On Saturday farmer Browne takes those same two mules and hooks them up to a carriage. Saturday is usually the day that farmers go to the market, but Henry has taken his whole family along this time. In fact, the mule-drawn carriage passes town altogether. The farmer is not going to market today, but seeing his son — a Tuskegee Airman.

== See also ==
- List of Allied propaganda films of World War II
- United States home front during World War II
