= List of American Masters episodes =

American Masters is a PBS television series which produces biographies on enduring writers, musicians, visual and performing artists, dramatists, filmmakers, and those who have left an indelible impression on the cultural landscape of the United States. It is produced by WNET in New York City. The show debuted on PBS in 1986.

== Series overview ==
Season	Episodes	Originally released	
Season	Episodes	First released	Last released
1	12	June 23, 1986	September 8, 1986
2	10	July 6, 1987	November 25, 1987
3	7	July 11, 1988	June 26, 1989
4	10	July 3, 1989	November 15, 1989
5	9	December 20, 1989	September 17, 1990
6	10	July 1, 1991	May 1, 1992
7	3	March 14, 1993	March 24, 1993
8	2	December 8, 1993	May 13, 1994
9	4	November 30, 1994	March 22, 1995
10	5	November 29, 1995	May 22, 1996
11	5	November 25, 1996	June 25, 1997
12	6	September 17, 1997	June 17, 1998
13	7	October 28, 1998	August 18, 1999
14	7	November 1, 1999	May 31, 2000
15	8	September 27, 2000	April 23, 2001
16	8	October 7, 2001	March 3, 2002
17	8	October 2, 2002	July 30, 2003
18	8	September 3, 2003	August 18, 2004
19	7	May 11, 2005	September 27, 2005
20	8	May 10, 2006	January 3, 2007
21	9	April 4, 2007	November 5, 2007
22	7	February 27, 2008	September 25, 2008
23	8	February 18, 2009	December 28, 2009
24	8	January 11, 2010	December 27, 2010
25	8	January 12, 2011	December 19, 2011
26	8	January 23, 2012	December 28, 2012
27	5	February 22, 2012	November 5, 2013
28	10	December 27, 2013	December 2, 2014
29	9	January 23, 2015	September 25, 2015
30	9	January 29, 2016	December 27, 2016
31	9	January 3, 2017	December 29, 2017
32	9	January 19, 2018	October 14, 2018
33	12	January 2, 2019	November 18, 2019
34	7	February 25, 2020	December 4, 2020
35	12	January 18, 2021	October 19, 2021
36	8	January 11, 2022	December 27, 2022
37	10	January 24, 2023	October 7, 2023
38	6	January 2, 2024	December 16, 2024
39	8	February 21, 2025	October 14, 2025
40	8	January 27, 2026	December 29, 2026

== Episodes ==
=== Season 1 (1986) ===
No. overall	No. in season	Title	Directed by	Subject Discipline	Original release date
1	1	"Arthur Miller: Private Conversations"	Christian Blackwood	Writer	June 23, 1986
2	2	"Philip Johnson: A Self Portrait"	John Musilli	Architect	June 30, 1986
3	3	"Katherine Anne Porter: The Eye Of Memory"	Ken Harrison	Writer	July 7, 1986
4	4	"Unknown Chaplin: Part 1"	Kevin Brownlow, David Gill	Actor/Performer	July 14, 1986
5	4	"Unknown Chaplin: Part 2"	Kevin Brownlow, David Gill	Actor/Performer	July 21, 1986
6	4	"Unknown Chaplin: Part 3"	Kevin Brownlow, David Gill	Actor/Performer	July 28, 1986
7	7	"Billie Holiday: The Long Night Of Lady Day"	John Jeremy	Musician	August 4, 1986
8	8	"James Levine: The Life In Music"	Peter Weinberg	Musician	August 11, 1986
9	9	"Aaron Copland: A Self Portrait"	Allan Miller	Musician	August 18, 1986
10	10	"Thomas Eakins: A Motion Portrait"	T.W. Timreck	Visual Artist	August 25, 1986
11	11	"Georgia O'Keeffe"	Perry Miller Adato	Visual Artist	September 1, 1986
12	12	"Eugene O'Neill: A Glory Of Ghosts"	Perry Miller Adato	Writer	September 8, 1986

=== Season 2 (1987) ===
No. overall	No. in season	Title	Directed by	Subject Discipline	Original release date
13	1	"Isaac In America: A Journey With Isaac Bashevis Singer"	Amram Nowak	Writer	July 6, 1987
14	2	"Directed By William Wyler"	Aviva Slesin	Director/Producer	July 13, 1987
15	3	"Arthur Rubinstein: Rubinstein Remembered"	Peter Rosen	Musician	July 20, 1987
16	4	"Alwin Nikolais And Murray Louis: Nik And Murray"	Christian Blackwood	Dancer/Choreographer	July 27, 1987
17	5	"George Gershwin Remembered"	Peter Adam	Musician	August 24, 1987
18	6	"Maurice Sendak: Mon Cher Papa"	Christopher Swann	Writer	August 31, 1987
19	7	"The Negro Ensemble Company"	Richard Kilberg	Institution	September 14, 1987
20	8	"Unanswered Prayers: The Life And Times Of Truman Capote"	Andrew Harries	Writer	September 21, 1987
21	9	"The Ten Year Lunch: The Wit And Legend Of The Algonquin Round Table"	Aviva Slesin	Writer	September 28, 1987
22	10	"Buster Keaton: A Hard Act To Follow Part 1"	Kevin Brownlow, David Gill	Actor/Performer	November 18, 1987
23	10	"Buster Keaton: A Hard Act To Follow Part 2"	Kevin Brownlow, David Gill	Actor/Performer	November 25, 1987

=== Season 3 (1988–89) ===
No. overall	No. in season	Title	Directed by	Subject Discipline	Original release date
24	1	"Lillian Gish: The Actor's Life For Me"	Terry Sanders	Actor/Performer	July 11, 1988
25	2	"A Duke Named Ellington"	Terry Carter	Musician	July 18, 1988
26	3	"Andre Kertesz Of The Cities"	Teri Wehn-Damisch	Photographer	August 8, 1988
27	4	"Aretha Franklin: The Queen Of Soul"	Cathe Neukum	Musician	August 22, 1988
28	5	"Diego Rivera: Rivera In America"	Rick Tejada-Flores	Visual Artist	August 29, 1988
29	6	"Augustus Saint Gaudens: Masque Of The Golden Bowl"	T.W.Timreck	Visual Artist	September 5, 1988
30	7	"Broadway's Dreamers: The Legacy Of The Group Theatre"	David Heeley	Institution	June 26, 1989

=== Season 4 (1989) ===
No. overall	No. in season	Title	Directed by	Subject Discipline	Original release date
31	1	"Harold Clurman: A Life Of Theatre"	Tom Klein, Alan Kaplan	Director/Producer	July 3, 1989
32	2	"Stella Adler: Awake And Dream!"	Merrill Brockway	Actor/Performer	July 10, 1989
33	3	"Satchmo: The Life Of Louis Armstrong"	Gary Giddins	Musician	July 31, 1989
34	4	"James Baldwin: The Price Of The Ticket"	Karen Thorsen	Writer	August 14, 1989
35	5	"Charlie Parker : Celebrating Bird"	Gary Giddins, Kendrick Simmons	Musician	August 17, 1989
36	6	"Simply Simon: Not Just For Laughs"	Amram Nowak	Writer	August 21, 1989
37	7	"Jasper Johns: Ideas In Paint"	Rick Tejada-Flores	Visual Artist	September 11, 1989
38	8	"Mort Sahl: The Loyal Opposition"	Robert B. Weide	Actor/Performer	September 18, 1989
39	9	"W. Eugene Smith: Photography Made Difficult"	Gene Lasko	Photographer	September 25, 1989
40	10	"Harold Lloyd: The Third Genius"	Kevin Brownlow, David Gill	Actor/Performer	November 15, 1989

=== Season 5 (1989–90) ===
No. overall	No. in season	Title	Directed by	Subject Discipline	Original release date
41	1	"Milos Forman: Portrait"	Vojtech Jasny	Director/Producer	December 20, 1989
42	2	"Preston Sturges: The Rise And Fall Of An American Dreamer"	Ken Bowser	Writer/Director	July 2, 1990
43	3	"John Cassavetes"	Deborah Geller	Director/Producer	July 9, 1990
44	4	"Martin Scorsese Directs"	Joel Sucher, Steven Fischler	Director/Producer	July 16, 1990
45	5	"You're The Top: The Cole Porter Story"	Allan Albert	Musician	July 23, 1990
46	6	"Edward R. Murrow: This Reporter"	Susan Steinberg	Journalist	July 30, 1990
47	7	"John Hammond: From Bessie Smith To Bruce Springsteen"	Hart Perry	Musician	August 20, 1990
48	8	"Sanford Meisner: The American Theatre's Best Kept Secret"	Nick Doob	Actor/Performer	August 27, 1990
49	9	"John Cage: I Have Nothing To Say And I'm Saying It"	Allan Miller	Musician	September 17, 1990

=== Season 6 (1991–92) ===
No. overall	No. in season	Title	Directed by	Subject Discipline	Original release date
50	1	"Helen Hayes: First Lady Of The American Theatre"	Reuben Aaronson, Timothy Marx	Actor/Performer	July 1, 1991
51	2	"Miracle On 44th Street: A Portrait Of The Actor's Studio"	Dennis Powers	Institution	July 8, 1991
52	3	"Albert Einstein: How I See The World"	Richard Kroehling	Scientist	July 22, 1991
53	4	"Sarah Vaughan: The Divine One"	Matthew Seig	Musician	July 29, 1991
54	5	"Frederic Remington: The Truth Of Other Days"	Tom Neff	Visual Artist	August 5, 1991
55	6	"Menuhin: A Family Portrait"	Tony Palmer	Musician	August 12, 1991
56	7	"Robert Motherwell And The New York School: Storming The Citadel"	Catherine Tatge	Visual Artist	August 26, 1991
57	8	"Ray Charles: The Genius Of Soul"	Yvonne Smith	Musician	January 3, 1992
58	9	"Superstar: The Life And Times Of Andy Warhol"	Chuck Workman	Visual Artist	April 10, 1992
59	10	"Waldo Salt: A Screenwriter's Journey"	Eugene Corr/ Robert Hillmann	Writer	May 1, 1992

=== Season 7 (1993) ===
No. overall	No. in season	Title	Directed by	Subject Discipline	Original release date
60	1	"Paul Simon: Born At The Right Time"	Susan Steinberg	Musician	March 8, 1993
61	2	"George Lucas: Heroes, Myths And Magic"	Larry Price and Jane Paley	Director/Producer	March 17, 1993
62	3	"D.W. Griffith: Father Of Film"	Kevin Brownlow and David Gill	Director/Producer	March 24, 1993

=== Season 8 (1993–94) ===
No. overall	No. in season	Title	Directed by	Subject Discipline	Original release date
63	1	"Benny Goodman: Adventures In The Kingdom Of Swing"	Oren Jacoby	Musician	December 8, 1993
64	2	"Martha Graham: The Dancer Revealed"	Catherine Tatge	Dancer/Choreographer	May 13, 1994

=== Season 9 (1994–95) ===
No. overall	No. in season	Title	Directed by	Subject Discipline	Original release date
65	1	"Rediscovering Will Rogers"	Stephan Chodorov	Actor/Performer	November 30, 1994
66	2	"Tennessee Williams: Orpheus Of The American Stage"	Merill Brockway	Writer	December 19, 1994
67	3	"Placido Domingo: A Musical Life"	Mick Csaky	Musician	February 15, 1995
68	4	"Edgar Allan Poe: Terror Of The Soul"	Karen Thomas	Writer	March 22, 1995

=== Season 10 (1995–96) ===
No. overall	No. in season	Title	Directed by	Subject Discipline	Original release date
69	1	"Rod Serling: Submitted For Your Approval"	Susan Lacy	Writer	November 29, 1995
70	2	"William Styron: The Way Of The Writer"	Variety Moszynski	Writer	January 22, 1996
71	3	"Richard Avedon: Darkness And Light"	Helen Whitney	Photographer	January 24, 1996
72	4	"Buckminster Fuller: Thinking Out Loud"	Karen Goodman, Kirk Simon	Architect	April 10, 1996
73	5	"Nichols & May--Take Two"	Phillip Schopper	Actor/Performer	May 22, 1996

=== Season 11 (1996–97) ===
No. overall	No. in season	Title	Directed by	Subject Discipline	Original release date
74	1	"Lena Horne: In Her Own Voice"	Susan Lacy	Actor/Performer	November 25, 1996
75	2	"Danny Kaye: A Legacy Of Laughter"	Bob Marty	Actor/Performer	December 10, 1996
76	3	"Man Ray: Prophet Of The Avant-Garde"	Mel Stuart	Visual Artist	April 9, 1997
77	4	"Jack Paar: As I Was Saying . . ."	Michael Macari Jr.	Television Personality	May 7, 1997
78	5	"Isamu Noguchi: Stones And Paper"	Bill Smock	Visual Artist	June 25, 1997

=== Season 12 (1997–98) ===
No. overall	No. in season	Title	Directed by	Subject Discipline	Original release date
79	1	"The Life And Times Of Allen Ginsberg"	Jerry Aronson	Writer	September 17, 1997
80	2	"Vaudeville: An American Masters Special"	Rosemary Garner, Greg Palmer	Actor/Performer	November 26, 1997
81	3	"Billy Wilder: The Human Comedy"	Mel Stuart	Director/Producer	February 4, 1998
82	4	"Lou Reed: Rock And Roll Heart"	Timothy Greenfield-Sanders	Musician	April 29, 1998
83	5	"Don Hewitt: 90 Minutes On 60 Minutes"	Susan Steinberg	Journalist	May 20, 1998
84	6	"Alexander Calder"	Roger Sherman	Visual Artist	June 17, 1998

=== Season 13 (1998–99) ===
No. overall	No. in season	Title	Directed by	Subject Discipline	Original release date
85	1	"Leonard Bernstein: Reaching For The Note"	Susan Lacy	Musician	October 28, 1998
86	2	"Al Hirschfeld: The Line King"	Susan Warms Dryfoos	Visual Artist	January 6, 1999
87	3	"Paul Robeson: Here I Stand"	St. Clair Bourne	Actor/Performer	February 24, 1999
88	4	"Robert Rauschenberg: Inventive Genius"	Karen Thomas	Visual Artist	April 7, 1999
89	5	"Dashiel Hammett"	Joshua Waletsky	Writer	June 30, 1999
90	6	"Lillian Hellman"	Philip Schopper	Writer	June 30, 1999
91	7	"Yours For A Song: The Women Of Tin Pan Alley"	Terry Benes	Musician	August 18, 1999

=== Season 14 (1999–2000) ===
No. overall	No. in season	Title	Directed by	Subject Discipline	Original release date
92	1	"Hitchcock, Selznick And The End Of Hollywood"	Michael Epstein	Director/Producer	November 1, 1999
93	2	"Norman Rockwell: Painting America"	Elena Mannes	Visual Artist	November 24, 1999
94	3	"Ella Fitzgerald: Something To Live For"	Charlotte Zwerin	Musician	December 8, 1999
95	4	"Paul Taylor: Dancemaker"	Matthew Diamond	Dancer/Choreographer	January 5, 2000
96	5	"Sidney Poitier: One Bright Light"	Lee Grant	Actor/Performer	February 2, 2000
97	6	"Isaac Stern: Life’s Virtuoso"	Karen Thomas	Musician	April 12, 2000
98	7	"The Source: The Story Of The Beats And The Beat Generation"	Chuck Workman	Writer	May 31, 2000

=== Season 15 (2000–01) ===
No. overall	No. in season	Title	Directed by	Subject Discipline	Original release date
99	1	"Clint Eastwood: Out Of The Shadows"	Bruce Ricker	Actor/Performer	September 27, 2000
100	2	"Norman Mailer: Mailer On Mailer"	Christine Le Goff and Tamar Hacker	Writer	October 4, 2000
101	3	"George Cuckor: On Cukor"	Robert Trachtenberg	Director/Producer	November 22, 2000
102	4	"Lucille Ball: Finding Lucy"	Pamela Mason Wagner	Television Personality	December 3, 2000
103	5	"Bob Marley: Rebel Music"	Jeremy Marre	Musician	February 14, 2001
104	6	"Alfred Stieglitz: The Eloquent Eye"	Perry Miller Adato	Photographer	April 16, 2001
105	7	"A Conversation With Gregory Peck"	Barbara Kopple	Actor/Performer	April 18, 2001
106	8	"Edward Curtis: Coming To Light"	Anne Makepeace	Photographer	April 23, 2001

=== Season 16 (2001–02) ===
No. overall	No. in season	Title	Directed by	Subject Discipline	Original release date
107	1	"Samuel Goldwyn"	Peter Jones & Mark Catalena	Director/Producer	October 7, 2001
108	2	"F. Scott Fitzgerald – Winter Dreams"	DeWitt Sage	Writer	October 14, 2001
109	3	"Richard Rodgers: The Sweetest Sounds"	Roger Sherman	Musician	November 4, 2001
110	4	"Quincy Jones: In The Pocket"	Michael Kantor	Musician	November 18, 2001
111	5	"Good Rockin’ Tonight: The Legacy Of Sun Records"	Bruce Sinofsky	Musician	November 28, 2001
112	6	"Merce Cunningham: A Lifetime Of Dance"	Charles Atlas	Dancer/Choreographer	December 16, 2001
113	7	"Ralph Ellison: An American Journey"	Avon Kirkland	Writer	February 19, 2002
114	8	"Gene Kelly: Anatomy Of A Dancer"	Robert Trachtenberg	Actor/Performer	March 3, 2002

=== Season 17 (2002–03) ===
No. overall	No. in season	Title	Directed by	Subject Discipline	Original release date
115	1	"Willie Nelson: Still Is Still Moving"	Steven Cantor	Musician	October 2, 2002
116	2	"Lon Chaney: Thousand Faces"	Kevin Brownlow	Actor/Performer	October 30, 2002
117	3	"Juilliard"	Maro Chermayeff	Institution	January 29, 2003
118	4	"Alice Waters And Her Delicious Revolution"	Doug Hamilton	Chef	March 19, 2003
119	5	"Joni Mitchell: Woman Of Heart And Mind"	Susan Lacy	Musician	April 2, 2003
120	6	"Muddy Waters: Can’T Be Satisfied"	Morgan Neville/ Robert Gordon	Musician	April 23, 2003
121	7	"Robert Capa: In Love And War"	Anne Makepeace	Photographer	May 28, 2003
122	8	"The Education Of Gore Vidal"	Deborah Dickson	Writer	July 30, 2003

=== Season 18 (2003–04) ===
No. overall	No. in season	Title	Directed by	Subject Discipline	Original release date
123	1	"Arthur Miller, Elia Kazan And The Blacklist: None Without Sin"	Michael Epstein	Director/Producer	September 3, 2003
124	2	"James Brown: Soul Survivor"	Jeremy Marre	Musician	October 29, 2003
125	3	"Balanchine - Master Of The Dance"	Merrill Brockway	Dancer/Choreographer	January 14, 2004
126	4	"Judy Garland: By Myself"	Susan Lacy	Actor/Performer	February 25, 2004
127	5	"A Vision Of Empire: Henry Luce And Time Life’s America"	Stephen Stept	Writer	April 28, 2004
128	6	"Cary Grant: A Class Apart"	Robert Trachtenberg	Actor/Performer	May 25, 2004
129	7	"Hank Williams: Honky Tonk Blues"	Morgan Neville & Colin Escott	Musician	June 23, 2004
130	8	"Julia! America’s Favorite Chef"	Marilyn Mellowes	Chef	August 18, 2004

=== Season 19 (2005) ===
No. overall	No. in season	Title	Directed by	Subject Discipline	Original release date
131	1	"James Dean: Sense Memories"	Gail Levin	Actor/Performer	May 11, 2005
132	2	"Sweet Honey In The Rock: Raise Your Voice"	Stanley Nelson	Musician	June 29, 2005
133	3	"George Stevens: A Filmmaker’s Journey"	George Stevens Jr.	Director/Producer	July 13, 2005
134	4	"Bob Newhart: Unbuttoned"	Kyra Thompson	Television Personality	July 20, 2005
135	5	"Willa Cather: The Road Is All"	Joel Geyer	Writer	September 7, 2005
136	6	"Ernest Hemingway: Rivers To The Sea"	DeWitt Sage	Writer	September 14, 2005
137	7	"Bob Dylan: No Direction Home"	Martin Scorsese	Musician	September 26, 2005 (Part 1) September 27, 2005 (Part 2)

=== Season 20 (2006–07) ===
No. overall	No. in season	Title	Directed by	Subject Discipline	Original release date
138	1	"John Ford/John Wayne: The Filmmaker And The Legend"	Sam Pollard	Actor/Performer	May 10, 2006
139	2	"The World Of Nat King Cole"	Ian A. Hunt	Musician	May 17, 2006
140	3	"Woody Guthrie: Ain’t Got No Home"	Peter Frumkin	Musician	July 12, 2006
141	4	"Marilyn Monroe: Still Life"	Gail Levin	Actor/Performer	July 19, 2006
142	5	"Walter Cronkite: Witness To History"	Catherine Tatge	Journalist	July 26, 2006
143	6	"Andy Warhol: A Documentary"	Ric Burns	Visual Artist	September 20, 2006
144	7	"Sketches Of Frank Gehry"	Sydney Pollack	Architect	September 27, 2006
145	8	"Annie Leibovitz: Life Through A Lens"	Barbara Leibovitz	Photographer	January 3, 2007

=== Season 21 (2007) ===
No. overall	No. in season	Title	Directed by	Subject Discipline	Original release date
146	1	"Novel Reflections On The American Dream"	Michael Epstein	Writer	April 4, 2007
147	2	"Atlantic Records: The House That Ahmet Built"	Susan Steinberg	Musician	May 2, 2007
148	3	"Les Paul: Chasing Sound"	John Paulson	Musician	July 11, 2007
149	4	"David Hockney: The Colors Of Music"	Maryté Kavaliauskas, Seth Schneidman	Visual Artist	July 18, 2007
150	5	"John James Audubon: Drawn From Nature"	Lawrence Hott	Visual Artist	July 25, 2007
151	6	"Tony Bennett: The Music Never Ends"	Bruce Ricker	Musician	September 12, 2007
152	7	"Orozco: Man Of Fire"	Laurie Coyle, Rick Tejada-Flores	Visual Artist	September 19, 2007
153	8	"Good Ol’ Charles Schulz"	David Van Taylor	Visual Artist	October 29, 2007
154	9	"Carol Burnett: A Woman Of Character"	Kyra Thompson	Television Personality	November 5, 2007

=== Season 22 (2008) ===
No. overall	No. in season	Title	Directed by	Subject Discipline	Original release date
155	1	"Pete Seeger: The Power Of Song"	Jim Brown	Musician	February 27, 2008
156	2	"Zora Neale Hurston - Jump At The Sun"	Sam Pollard	Writer	April 9, 2008
157	3	"Marvin Gaye: What’s Going On"	Sam Pollard	Musician	May 7, 2008
158	4	"You Must Remember This: The Warner Brothers Story - Part 1"	Richard Schickel	Producers	September 23, 2008
159	5	"You Must Remember This: The Warner Brothers Story - Part 2"	Richard Schickel	Producers	September 24, 2008
160	6	"You Must Remember This: The Warner Brothers Story - Part 3"	Richard Schickel	Producers	September 25, 2008
161	7	"The Brothers Warner"	Cass Warner Sperling	Producers	September 25, 2008

=== Season 23 (2009) ===
No. overall	No. in season	Title	Directed by	Subject Discipline	Original release date
162	1	"Jerome Robbins: Something To Dance About"	Judy Kinberg	Dancer/Choreographer	February 18, 2009
163	2	"Glass: A Portrait Of Philip In Twelve Parts"	Scott Hicks	Musician	April 8, 2009
164	3	"Hollywood Chinese"	Arthur Dong	Actor/Performer	May 27, 2009
165	4	"Neil Young: Won’t Be Denied"	Unknown	Musician	June 10, 2009
166	5	"Garrison Keillor: The Man On The Radio In The Red Shoes"	Peter Rosen	Actor/Performer	July 1, 2009
167	6	"Trumbo"	Peter Askin	Writer	September 2, 2009
168	7	"Joan Baez : How Sweet The Sound"	Mary Wharton	Musician	October 14, 2009
169	8	"Louisa May Alcott: The Woman Behind Little Women"	Nancy Porter	Writer	December 28, 2009

=== Season 24 (2010) ===
No. overall	No. in season	Title	Directed by	Subject Discipline	Original release date
170	1	"Sam Cooke: Crossing Over"	John Antonelli	Musician	January 11, 2010
171	2	"I.M. Pei: Building China Modern"	Anne Makepeace	Architect	March 31, 2010
172	3	"When You’re Strange: A Film About The Doors"	Tom DiCillo	Musician	May 12, 2010
173	4	"Merle Haggard: Learning To Live With Myself"	Gandulf Hennig	Musician	July 21, 2010
174	5	"Cachao: Uno Más"	Dikayl Rimmasch	Musician	September 20, 2010
175	6	"A Letter To Elia/Reflecting On Kazan"	KENT JONES	Director/Producer	October 4, 2010
176	7	"LennoNYC"	Michael Epstein	Musician	November 22, 2010
177	8	"Genius Within: The Inner Life of Glenn Gould"	Michèle Hozer, Peter Raymont	Musician	December 27, 2010

=== Season 25 (2011) ===
No. overall	No. in season	Title	Directed by	Subject Discipline	Original release date
178	1	"Jeff Bridges: The Dude Abides"	Gail Levin	Actor/Performer	January 12, 2011
179	2	"Troubadours: Carole King / James Taylor & The Rise Of The Singer-Songwriter"	Morgan Neville	Musician	March 2, 2011
180	3	"John Muir In The New World"	Catherine Tatge	Environmentalist	April 18, 2011
181	4	"James Levine: America’s Maestro"	Susan Froemke	Musician	June 1, 2011
182	5	"Pearl Jam Twenty"	Cameron Crowe	Musician	October 21, 2011
183	6	"Bill T. Jones: A Good Man"	Gordon Quinn & Bob Hercules	Dancer/Choreographer	November 11, 2011
184	7	"Woody Allen: A Documentary"	Bob Weide	Director/Producer	November 20, 2011
185	8	"Charles and Ray Eames: The Architect and the Painter"	Jason Cohn and Bill Jersey	Architect and Designer	December 19, 2011

=== Season 26 (2012) ===
No. overall	No. in season	Title	Directed by	Subject Discipline	Original release date
186	1	"Phil Ochs: There But For Fortune"	Kenneth Bowser	Musician	January 23, 2012
187	2	"Margaret Mitchell: American Rebel"	Pamela Roberts and Kathy White	Writer	February 2, 2012
188	3	"Cab Calloway: Sketches"	Gail Levin	Musician	February 27, 2012
189	4	"Harper Lee: Hey Boo!"	Mary McDonagh Murphy	Writer	April 2, 2012
190	5	"Johnny Carson: King Of Late Night"	Peter Jones & Mark Catalena	Television Personality	May 14, 2012
191	6	"The Day Carl Sandburg Died"	Paul Bonesteel	Writer	September 24, 2012
192	7	"Inventing David Geffen"	Susan Lacy	Director/Producer	November 20, 2012
193	8	"Joffrey: Mavericks Of American Dance"	Bob Hercules	Dancer/Choreographer	December 28, 2012

=== Season 27 (2013) ===
No. overall	No. in season	Title	Directed by	Subject Discipline	Original release date
194	1	"Sister Rosetta Tharpe: The Godmother Of Rock And Roll"	Mick Csaky	Musician	February 22, 2013
195	2	"Philip Roth: Unmasked"	William Karel and Livia Manera	Writer	March 29, 2013
196	3	"Mel Brooks: Make A Noise"	Robert Trachtenberg	Director/Producer	May 20, 2013
197	4	"Billie Jean King"	James Erskine	Athlete	September 10, 2013
198	5	"Jimi Hendrix - Hear My Train A Comin'"	Bob Smeaton	Musician	November 5, 2013

=== Season 28 (2013–14) ===
No. overall	No. in season	Title	Directed by	Subject Discipline	Original release date
199	1	"Marvin Hamlisch: What He Did For Love"	Dori Berinstein	Musician	December 27, 2013
200	2	"Salinger"	Shane Salerno	Writer	January 21, 2014
201	3	"Alice Walker: Beauty In Truth"	Pratibha Parmar	Writer	February 7, 2014
202	4	"A Fierce Green Fire"	Mark Kitchell	Environmentalists	April 22, 2014
203	5	"Plimpton! Starring George Plimpton As Himself"	Luke Poling & Tom Bean	Writer	May 16, 2014
204	6	"Tanaquil Le Clercq: Afternoon Of A Faun"	Nancy Buirski	Dancer/Choreographer	June 20, 2014
205	7	"Dorothea Lange: Grab A Hunk Of Lightning"	Dyanna Taylor	Photographer	August 29, 2014
206	8	"The Boomer List"	Timothy Greenfield-Sanders	Institution	September 23, 2014
207	9	"Joan Rivers: A Piece Of Work"	Ricki Stern	Television Personality	September 23, 2014
208	10	"Bing Crosby Rediscovered"	Robert Trachtenberg	Actor/Performer	December 2, 2014

=== Season 29 (2015) ===
No. overall	No. in season	Title	Directed by	Subject Discipline	Original release date
209	1	"Ricky Jay: Deceptive Practice"	Molly Bernstein	Actor/Performer	January 23, 2015
210	2	"August Wilson: The Ground On Which I Stand"	Sam Pollard	Writer	February 20, 2015
211	3	"Jascha Heifetz: God's Fiddler"	Peter Rosen	Musician	April 16, 2015
212	4	"American Ballet Theatre: A History"	Ric Burns	Dancer/Choreographer	May 15, 2015
213	6	"Althea"	Rex Miller	Athlete	September 4, 2015
214	7	"Pedro E. Guerrero: A Photographer's Journey"	Raymond Telles & Yvan Iturriaga	Photographer	September 18, 2015
215	9	"The Women's List"	Timothy Greenfield-Sanders	Institution	September 25, 2015

=== Season 30 (2016) ===
No. overall	No. in season	Title	Directed by	Subject Discipline	Original release date
216	1	"Mike Nichols"	Elaine May	Director/Producer	January 29, 2016
217	2	"B.B. King: The Life Of Riley"	Jon Brewer	Musician	February 12, 2016
218	3	"Carole King: Natural Woman"	George Scott	Musician	February 19, 2016
219	4	"Fats Domino And The Birth Of Rock 'N' Roll"	Joe Lauro	Musician	February 26, 2016
220	5	"Loretta Lynn: Still A Mountain Girl"	Vikram Jayanti	Musician	March 4, 2016
221	6	"Janis: Little Girl Blue"	Amy Berg	Musician	May 3, 2016
222	7	"The Highwaymen: Friends Til The End"	Jim Brown	Musician	May 27, 2016
223	8	"Norman Lear: Just Another Version Of You"	Heidi Ewing & Rachel Grady	Director/Producer	October 25, 2016
224	9	"Eero Saarinen: The Architect Who Saw The Future"	Peter Rosen	Architect	December 27, 2016

=== Season 31 (2017) ===
No. overall	No. in season	Title	Directed by	Subject Discipline	Original release date
225	1	"By Sidney Lumet"	Nanc y Buirski	Director/Producer	January 3, 2017
226	2	"Maya Angelou: And Still I Rise"	Bob Hercules & Rita Coburn Whack	Writer	February 21, 2017
227	3	"Patsy Cline"	Barbara J. Hall	Musician	March 4, 2017
228	4	"James Beard: America's First Foodie"	Elizabeth Federici	Chef	May 19, 2017
229	5	"Jacques Pépin: The Art Of The Craft"	Peter L. Stein	Chef	May 26, 2017
230	6	"Richard Linklater - Dream Is Destiny"	Karen Bernstein, Louis Black	Director/Producer	September 1, 2017
231	7	"Tyrus"	Pamela Tom	Visual Artist	September 8, 2017
232	8	"Edgar Allan Poe: Buried Alive"	Eric Stange	Writer	October 30, 2017
233	9	"This Is Bob Hope…"	John Scheinfeld	Actor/Performer	December 29, 2017

=== Season 32 (2018) ===
No. overall	No. in season	Title	Directed by	Subject Discipline	Original release date
234	1	"Lorraine Hansberry: Sighted Eyes/Feeling Heart"	Tracy Heather Strain	Writer	January 19, 2018
235	3	"Bombshell: The Hedy Lamarr Story"	Alexandra Dean	Actor/Performer	May 18, 2018
236	4	"Ted Williams:"The Greatest Hitter Who Ever Lived""	Nick Davis	Athlete	July 23, 2018
237	5	"Eva Hesse"	Marcie Begleiter	Visual Artist	August 31, 2018
238	6	"Everybody Knows… Elizabeth Murray"	Kristi Zea	Visual Artist	September 7, 2018
239	7	"Wyeth"	Glenn Holsten	Visual Artist	September 7, 2018
240	8	"Basquiat: Rage To Riches"	David Shulman	Visual Artist	September 14, 2018
241	9	"Itzhak"	Alison Chernick	Musician	October 14, 2018

=== Season 33 (2019) ===
No. overall	No. in season	Title	Directed by	Subject Discipline	Original release date
242	1	"Decoding Watson"	Mark Mannucci	Scientist	January 2, 2019
243	2	"Sammy Davis, Jr.: I'Ve Gotta Be Me"	Sam Pollard	Musician	February 19, 2019
244	3	"Charley Pride: I'm Just Me"	Barbara Hall	Musician	February 22, 2019
245	4	"Holly Near: Singing For Our Lives"	Jim Brown	Musician	March 1, 2019
246	5	"Joseph Pulitzer: Voice Of The People"	Oren Rudavsky	Journalist	April 12, 2019
247	6	"Garry Winogrand: All Things Are Photographable"	Sasha Waters Freyer	Photographer	April 19, 2019
248	8	"Terrence McNally: Every Act Of Life"	Jeff Kaufman	Writer	June 14, 2019
249	7	"Robert Shaw: Man Of Many Voices"	Pamela Roberts, Peter Miller	Musician	June 21, 2019
250	9	"Worlds Of Ursula K. Le Guin"	Arwen Curry	Writer	August 2, 2019
251	10	"Raul Julia: The World's A Stage"	Ben DeJesus	Actor/Performer	September 13, 2019
252	11	"Rothko: Pictures Must Be Miraculous"	Eric Slade	Visual Artist	October 25, 2019
253	12	"N. Scott Momaday: Words From A Bear"	Jeffrey Palmer	Writer	November 18, 2019

=== Season 34 (2020) ===
No. overall	No. in season	Title	Directed by	Subject Discipline	Original release date
254	1	"Miles Davis: Birth of the Cool"	Stanley Nelson	Musician	February 25, 2020
255	2	"Mae West: Dirty Blonde"	Sally Rosenthal, Julia Marchesi	Actor/Performer	June 16, 2020
256	3	"Toni Morrison: The Pieces I Am"	Timothy Greenfield-Sanders	Writer	June 23, 2020
257	4	"Unladylike2020: The Changemakers"	Charlotte Mangin, Sandra Rattley	Institution	July 10, 2020
258	5	"Walter Winchell: The Power Of Gossip"	Ben Loeterman	Journalist	October 20, 2020
259	6	"Michael Tilson Thomas: Where Now Is"	Susan Froemke	Musician	October 23, 2020
261	7	"Laura Ingalls Wilder: Prairie To Page"	Mary Murphy	Writer	December 29, 2020
260	8	"Keith Haring: Street Art Boy"	Ben Anthony	Visual Artist	December 4, 2020

=== Season 35 (2021) ===
No. overall	No. in season	Title	Directed by	Subject Discipline	Original release date
262	1	"How It Feels To Be Free"	Yoruba Richen	Actors/Performers	January 18, 2021
263	2	"Flannery"	Elizabeth Coffman, Mark Bosco	Writer	March 23, 2021
264	3	"Twyla Moves"	Steven Cantor	Dancer/Choreographer	March 26, 2021
265	4	"Never Too Late: The Doc Severinsen Story"	Kevin S. Bright, Jeff Consiglio	Musician	April 2, 2021
266	5	"Oliver Sacks: His Own Life"	Ric Burns	Scientist	April 9, 2021
267	6	"Amy Tan: Unintended Memoir"	Jamie Redford	Writer	May 3, 2021
268	7	"Ballerina Boys"	Chana Gazit, Martie Barylick	Dancers/Choreographers	June 4, 2021
269	8	"Buddy Guy: The Blues Chase The Blues Away"	Devin Amar, Matt Mitchener, Charles Todd	Musician	July 27, 2021
270	9	"Rita Moreno: Just A Girl Who Decided To Go For It"	Mariem Pérez Riera	Actor/Performer	October 5, 2021
271	10	"Becoming Helen Keller"	Michael Pressman	Writer	October 19, 2021

=== Season 36 (2022) ===
No. overall	No. in season	Title	Directed by	Subject Discipline	Original release date
272	1	"Ailey"	Jamila Wignot	Dancer/Choreographer	January 11, 2022
273	2	"Marian Anderson: The Whole World in Her Hands"	Rita Coburn	Singer	May 10, 2022
274	3	"Waterman - Duke: Ambassador of Aloha"	Isaac Halasima	Athlete	February 8, 2022
275	4	"Joe Papp in Five Acts"	Tracie Holder and Karen Thorsen	Producer/Director	June 3, 2022
276	5	"Brian Wilson: Long Promised Road"	Brent Wilson	Singer	June 14, 2022
277	6	"Buffy Sainte-Marie: Carry It On"	Madison Thomas	Singer	November 22, 2022
278	7	"The Adventures of Saul Bellow"	Asaf Galay	Writer	December 12, 2022
279	8	"Groucho & Cavett"	Robert S. Bader	Comedian	December 27, 2022

=== Season 37 (2023) ===
No. overall	No. in season	Title	Directed by	Subject Discipline	Original release date
273	1	"Roberta Flack"	Antonino D’Ambrosio	Singer	January 24, 2023
Roberta Flack’s virtuosity was inseparable from her commitment to civil rights.
274	2	"Dr. Tony Fauci"	Mark Mannucci	Scientist, Public Servant	March 21, 2023
Anthony Fauci has served as the director of the National Institute of Allergy and Infectious Diseases and the Chief Medical Advisor to the President for seven different administrations in the U.S.
275	3	"In The Making"	Christine Turner, Dilsey Davis	J'Nai Bridges - Opera Singer, Rissi Palmer - Singer	March 21, 2023
Two films focused on two barrier–breaking musicians: opera singer J’Nai Bridges and country artist Rissi Palmer.
276	4	"Nam June Paik: Moon Is the Oldest TV"	Amanda Kim	Visual Artist	May 16, 2023
The world through the eyes of Nam June Paik, the father of video art and coiner of the term "electronic superhighway."
277	5	"Little Richard: King and Queen of Rock ‘n’ Roll"	James House	Musician	June 2, 2023
The legacy of Little Richard, including his advocacy for the rights of Black artists in the music industry.
278	6	"Jerry Brown: The Disrupter"	Marina Zenovich	Politician	September 15, 2023
The political and personal journey of Jerry Brown, the longest serving governor in California history.
279	7	"Floyd Abrams: Speaking Freely"	Yael Melamede	Lawyer	September 22, 2023
The 50-year career of First Amendment lawyer Floyd Abrams.
280	8	"A Song for Cesar"	Andres Alegria & Abel Sanchez	Union & civil rights activist	September 29, 2023
The legacy of Cesar Chavez and how music and the arts were instrumental to the success of the farmworkers’ movement he helped found.
281	9	"Max Roach: The Drum Also Waltzes"	Sam Pollard & Ben Shapiro	Musician	October 6, 2023
The music of Max Roach and how he was inspired and challenged by the inequities of the society around him.
282	10	"José Clemente Orozco: Hombre de Fuego (En Español)"	Laurie Coyle & Rick Tejada-Flores	Visual Artist	October 7, 2023
The Spanish language version of "José Clemente Orozco: Man of Fire," the series' seventh installment of Season 21.

=== Season 38 (2024) ===
No. overall	No. in season	Title	Directed by	Subject Discipline	Original release date
283	1	"Hopper: An American Love Story"	Phil Grabsky & Michael Cascio	Visual Artist	January 2, 2024
284	2	"Moynihan"	Joseph Dorman & Toby Perl Freilich	Politician/Diplomat	March 29, 2024
285	3	"The Incomparable Mr. Buckley"	Barak Goodman	Author/Commentator	April 5, 2024
286	4	"Blake Edwards: A Love Story in 24 Frames"	Danny Gold	Director/Screenwriter/Producer	August 27, 2024
287	5	"Julia Alvarez: A Life Reimagined"	Adriana Bosch	Poet/Novelist	September 17, 2024
288	6	"Brenda Lee: Rockin' Around"	Barbara Hall	Singer	December 16, 2024

=== Season 39 (2025) ===
No. overall	No. in season	Title	Directed by	Subject Discipline	Original release date
289	1	"The Disappearance of Miss Scott"	Nicole London	Pianist/Singer	February 21, 2025
Hazel Scott was a jazz virtuoso, a screen superstar and an early civil rights pioneer
290	2	"Liza: A Truly Terrific Absolutely True Story"	Bruce David Klein	Actress/Singer/Dancer	April 1, 2025
Liza Minnelli is an extraordinary singer and actress with a huge legacy in showbiz
291	3	"Art Spiegelman: Disaster Is My Muse"	Molly Bernstein & Philip Dolin	Cartoonist/Editor	April 15, 2025
Cartoonist whose work Maus, about his parents' survival of the Holocaust, made a huge impact
292	4	"Janis Ian: Breaking Silence"	Varda Bar-Kar	Singer-songwriter	June 20, 2025
Singer/songwriter Janis Ian rose as a folk icon and gay rights advocate
293	5	"Hannah Arendt: Facing Tyranny"	Chana Gazit & Jeff Bieber	Historian/Philosopher	June 27, 2025
Hannah was one of the most fearless policial thinkers of the 20th century
294	6	"Marcella"	Peter Miller	Cooking Writer	July 11, 2025
How a celebrated writer shaped Italian cuisine in America
295	7	"Marlee Matlin: Not Alone Anymore"	Shoshannah Stern	Actress/Activist/Author	October 14, 2025
Deaf rights advocate and actor, who became first deaf actor to win an Oscar
296	8	"Starring Dick Van Dyke"	John Scheinfeld	Actor	December 12, 2025
Legendary actor who has delighted audiences for 8 decades

=== Season 40 (2026) ===
No. overall	No. in season	Title	Directed by	Subject Discipline	Original release date
297	1	"Elie Wiesel: Soul on Fire"	Oren Rudavsky	Writer	January 27, 2026
Elie Wiesel is Holocaust survivor and Nobel Peace Prize-winning author of Night.
298	2	"Sun Ra: Do the Impossible"	Christine Turner	Musician	February 20, 2026
Sun Ra was a poet, philosopher and jazz music visionary
299	3	"Bella! This Woman's Place Is in the House"	Jeff L. Lieberman	Politician	March 17, 2026
Bella Abzug was a trailblazing social activist and politician
300	4	"W.E.B Du Bois: Rebel with a Cause"	Rita Coburn	Politician/civil rights activist	May 29, 2026
W.E.B. Du Bois was a Black scholar and civil rights pioneer
301	5	"Mary Oliver: Saved by the Beauty of the World"	Sasha Waters	Writer/Poet	August 25, 2026
Mary Oliver was a prize-winner writer and poet
302	6	"American Pachuco: The Legend of Luis Valdez"	David Alvarado	Chicano Playwright and Filmmaker	October 6, 2026
Luis Valdez was a Chicano playwright and filmmaker

== Upcoming episodes ==
Title	Directed by	Premiere date
"Liz Diller & Ric Scofidio: Architect Provocateurs" (about notable architects)"	Jeff Bieber	November 24 2026
"Wilder" (about actor Gene Wilder)"	Chris Smith	December 29 2026
