= Galay =

Galay or Galai is a surname of multiple origins: Russian: Галай, Ukrainian: Галай, or Hebrew: גלאי. It may also be a part of a Burmese name. The Ukrainian name is also transliterated as Halay or Halai. Notable people with the name include:

- Alexandra Muravyeva-Galay (fl. from early 1990s), Russian florist
- Asaf Galay (born 1978), Israeli-American filmmaker
- Dan Galai (born 1945), Israeli economist
- Daniel Galay (born 1945), Israeli writer and composer
- Irina Galay (born 1988), Ukrainian climber
- Maria Galay (born 1992), Russian footballer
- Noam Galai (born 1984), Israeli photographer
- Roman Galay (born 1998), Russia-born Finnish figure skater

== Burmese name ==
- Myat Phaya Galay (1887–1936), Burmese royal princess
- Taung Galay Sayadaw (born 1960), Karen Buddhist monk, writer, and historian

== See also ==
- Galais
