= They Came for Good =

- Directed by: Amram Nowak
- Written by: Manya Starr
- Release date: 1997
- Country: United States
- Language: English

They Came for Good: A History of the Jews in the US is a 1997 documentary by Oscar nominated director Amram Nowak that explores the challenges and contributions of Jews during America's founding history. The film discusses a series of personalities, including Asher Levy, Louis Moses Gomez, Rebecca Gratz, Uriah Phillips Levy, Levi Strauss, Isaac Leeser, Isaac Mayer Wise, Judah Benjamin, the Warburgs, the Schiffs, and Emma Lazarus.

== Summary ==
They Came for Good is a two-part documentary series of critical acclaim.

Part I focuses on the contributions of Sephardic Jews in early America and their hard-fought struggle for equality that eventually brought them presidential respect. Unlike any national leader before his time President George Washington, made history by embracing the Jewish community upon his election and asserting their equality. The pioneering Jews of early America came to the New World to practice their religion openly, and once they arrived they began to shape the budding nation.

Part II examines the people and personalities who shaped the critical time of the mid-18th century, from the creators of the Orthodox and Reform movements to the Ashkenazi entrepreneurs who crossed the Atlantic Ocean and Midwestern prairie to create new American identities.

In 1820, most took a subdued approach to demonstrating their Jewishness. They were a shadow of a population, numbering less than 3,000 nationwide — a minority in a nation of minorities. In the years that followed, however, a massive influx of immigrant Ashkenazi Jewry from Europe arrived to cause a spiritual and economic sea change. The film covers American Jew's entrepreneurial spirit from the mostly-Jewish peddlers selling goods on the back roads of the South to those who run the general stores that will one day grow into nationwide chains like Macy’s, Sears, Gimbels, Stern's and Filene's, Jews were major purveyors of commercial good in this country and, thus, major contributors to popular culture.

== Filmmaker ==
Director Amram Nowak was nominated for an Oscar for his film Isaac in America. He has also worked as a writer and producer.

== See also ==
- History of the Jews in the United States
- Jewish history in Colonial America

Other documentaries about American-Jewish history:

- Roosevelt, New Jersey: Visions of Utopia
- A Home on the Range
- From Swastika to Jim Crow
