= ArmWomenNow =

Ukrainian volunteer project

- Озброїмо жінок зараз
- Founder: Iryna Nikorak
- Type: Social initiative
- Headquarters: Ukraine
- Services: Providing women serving in the Armed Forces of Ukraine with women's military uniforms and underwear
- Official language: Ukrainian
- Website: armwomennow.com

ArmWomenNow (Ukrainian: Озброїмо жінок зараз) is a Ukrainian volunteer project, a social initiative aimed at providing women serving in the Armed Forces of Ukraine with women's military uniforms and underwear designed according to the NATO standardization agreement.

== About the initiative ==
The NGO Bold Ukraine implements the initiative. The project initiator is an activist, public figure and deputy of the Kyiv City Council, Iryna Nikorak. The founder specifies the goal of ArmWomenNow is the standard ratification of women's uniforms by the Ministry of Defence of Ukraine to provide servicewomen with uniforms at the state level in accordance with their needs.

As of the end of 2022, they sewed and handed over to women on the front line 2000 sets of uniforms free of charge.

In addition to uniforms, women get women's tactical underwear, thermal underwear, warm winter jackets and pants, balaclavas, fleece sweatshirts and hats sewn in Ukraine.

== History ==
At the end of April 2022, the humanitarian headquarters of Iryna Nikorak, delivering aid to the military forces on the front line, received a request from one of the military units for an XS uniform for a female artillery officer. In search of uniforms, the headquarters volunteers found out that the Ministry of Defence of Ukraine has approved only ceremony women's uniforms, while field uniforms are provided only for men. Due to the inconsistency of standard army patterns with the peculiarities of women's bodily constitution, servicewomen were forced to alter men's uniforms to their sizes at their own expense.

Given the large number of women who joined the Armed Forces of Ukraine at the beginning of the full-scale invasion of the Russian army in February 2022, the ArmWomenNow social initiative was created. The next step was to study the international experience of the world and obtain samples of women's military uniforms from these countries. Having studied the uniforms and underwear of the world's armies, the project activists, with the help of professional clothing designers, began to develop the design for Ukrainian women's military uniforms. The development lasted almost a month and a half. After the approval of the design, they started sewing consistently and transferring women's military uniforms to the defenders.

Alongside with the sewing of summer women's uniforms, they started working on the appropriate design for tactical underwear and winter clothing for women.

At the end of 2022, the ArmWomenNow uniform was officially piloted in several military units of the Armed Forces of Ukraine, as stated by the Minister of Defense Oleksiy Reznikov.

On December 21, 2022, the project presented Ukraine's first samples of women's military ammunition, including bulletproof vests.

Among NATO officials from western Europe, Vineta Kleine (Head of the NATO Information and Documentation Centre in Ukraine) supported the project. Vitali Klitschko passed the uniforms to women from the 112th Separate Territorial Defence Brigade (Ukraine).

== Information and Financial Support ==
The initiative is not state-funded and exists solely on funds raised by the ArmWomenNow initiative from private donors, well-known cultural, sports and media people, and Ukrainian business leaders. Servicewomen can order a set of uniforms for free on the ArmWomenNow Instagram page. You can also fill out a Google form on the project website, after which the initiative team will contact the servicewoman to clarify the details. Priority is given to women who directly take part in military actions.

Dozens of cultural, sports, media and political leaders in Ukraine and abroad have joined the initiative. The main directions are information partnership of the project, logistic support, direct financial assistance, and donations collection.

Among those who helped to raise funds for the initiative are Oles Dovgiy, Oleksandr Ponomariov, Mykhailo Khoma, Klitschko brothers, Iryna Halay, Okean Elzy band, BoomBox band, Sonya Morozyuk, Nadia Dorofeeva, Kateryna Silchenko, Dasha Astafieva, Svyatoslav Vakarchuk, Dasha Shea, Olena Gudkova, Oleksiy Durnev, ICG Kovalska, Monatik, Iryna Horova, Nova Poshta, PerlaHelsa, Omelia atelier, Kateryna Fonseka.
