= Manya Starr =

American writer (1921 - 2000)

Manya Garbat Starr (January 21, 1921 - July 26, 2000) was an American writer who worked on radio and television programs. She also collaborated with her husband on films.

== Early life and education ==
Starr was born Manya Garbat, the daughter of Dr. and Mrs. Abraham L. Garbat, on January 21, 1921. She graduated from the Dalton School in New York City and, in 1941, from Bryn Mawr College. George Gershwin was her godfather, and while she was at Bryn Mawr she produced, directed, and re-wrote Porgy and Bess under rights granted by Gershwin's estate.

== Career ==
After Starr's college graduation she became a production assistant for the Theatre Guild, after which she was a script reader for producer John Golden. Following that job, she wrote publicity material for the Theatre Wing and then wrote ad libs for the Dorothy and Dick radio program. She was an intelligence officer as a lieutenant (junior grade) in the WAVES for two years during World War II, after which she resumed writing for radio, selling her first script to Columbia Workshop.

Starr was the head writer for the soap opera Claudia. Other radio programs for which she wrote included Mr. Chameleon, Evelyn Winters, Doctor's Wife, The Egg and I, First Love, and Paradise Bay. She created, and wrote for, the television soap opera The Clear Horizon. As the owner of that program, she also dealt with actors' contracts and kept the building of sets with budgeted costs. Other TV programs for which she wrote included Suspense, The Doctors, Home, and Experiment in Television. She wrote the off-Broadway play Whisper to Me.

In 1973 Starr became the first female chairman of the Writers Guild of America. She was elected to that position after having been president of Writer's Guild East and international secretary of the International Writer's Guild.

=== Collaboration with Nowak ===
She collaborated with the documentary filmmaker Amram Nowak, whom she married in 1981 or 1982. Their projects included Isaac in America: A Journey with Isaac Bashevis Singer, which was nominated for an Academy Award in 1987. Other projects of theirs were broadcast on PBS programs. They included: "Neil Simon — Not Just for Laughs" on American Masters and "The Cafeteria" (adapted from a Singer short story) on American Playhouse. The executive producer of American Masters, Susan Lacy, said, "They're very open, they're wonderful people to work with — very intelligent, very talented, very tenacious." The couple collaborated on films for 20 years.

== Personal life ==
She and Roger Starr were married on December 2, 1945, in New York City. They had two sons. She married Nowak on May 22, 1981. She died on July 26, 2000, from complications after surgery at Lennox Hill Hospital in New York, aged 79.
