= The Doctor's Wife (radio series) =

American radio soap opera

The Doctor's Wife is an American radio serial drama that was broadcast on NBC beginning on March 3, 1952. Its initial run ended in October 1953, but NBC brought it back on January 3, 1955.

== Overview ==
Set in a suburban area of New York, The Doctor's Wife presented a doctor's life from his wife's perspective. The series's writer, Manya Starr, was the daughter of a doctor. She said that the program "encompasses the psychological and medical problems that confront a physician, his wife, and their community."

The central characters were doctor Dan Palmer and his wife, Julia, but episodes included stories about patients and friends. Julie was 24 years old, but she possessed understanding and maturity usually found in people much older. Besides helping Dan, Julie helped his "newly married and very confused" brother, Ned, deal with his problems, which included developing an inferiority complex. Dan's success made beginning a career difficult for Ned. She also helped Josiah Sampson, an elderly man who made cabinets and who was "strangely dependent on Julie".

Episodes' story lines included one in which Palmer was suspended from the hospital at which he worked. The situation was complicated when newspaper coverage of the suspension portrayed him "in a most unfavorable light", which reinforced the opinions of people who opposed him. In another story line, Palmer was at odds with his colleagues after a rich woman offered to build an additional wing at the hospital, but she wanted to impose restrictions on who could be admitted. In 1956, Julie began to wonder whether her energy and self-reliance were a problem for Dan — whether "she wouldn't be better off to turn herself into a clinging-vine, self-effacing type of housewife".

== Cast ==
- Julia Palmer – Patricia Wheel
- Dan Palmer – Donald Curtis (as Don Curtis), John Baragrey, Karl Weber
- Dan's brother, Ned – George Roy Hill
- Betty – Margaret Hamilton
- Lois Miller – Jan Miner
- Dr. Sanders – Mercer McLeod
- Frank Johnson – Ed Latimer
- Dr. Edwards – Vinton Hayworth
- Dr. Clem Holt – Kenny Delmar
- Fred Conrad – Donald Buka
- Jenny – Helen Gerald
- Announcer – Bob Sherry

When Hill was called to active duty with the United States Marine Corps effective May 29, 1952, the program had his character being called up for military service. That approach kept the part available for Hill after he returned from service. Magee Adams wrote in The Cincinnati Enquirer, "For once, fiction will run parallel to fact," and added, "With Ned away in uniform, Julie is sure to have plenty of opportunity to flutter anxiously over what's happening to her brother-in-law."

== Production ==
Ex-Lax sponsored The Doctor's Wife. The sponsorship was a change in radio advertising strategy for Ex-Lax, which had focused on spot advertising the previous year. Irvin A. Edleman, vice president in charge of advertising, said that sponsoring The Doctor's Wife was the largest radio campaign for Ex-Lax. The company ended its sponsorship on August 27, 1953.

The Doctor's Wife was initially broadcast from 5:45 to 6 p.m. Eastern Time Monday-Friday. During 16 months of its absence in 1953–54, NBC received more than 100,000 letters asking that the show be returned to the air. The revived program was broadcast from 3:45 to 4 p.m. E. T. In 1955–56, it was broadcast from 10:30 to 10:45 a.m. E. T.

The producer was Joe Gratz, and the director was John Dietz.

== Critical response ==
A review of the premiere episode in the trade publication Variety summarized the show as "no better — no worse than scores of its counterparts ..." The review suggested that the program was better suited to a morning time slot, because at 5:45 p.m. Eastern Time "housewives are preparing dinner and the kids are watching TV."

== Television adaptation ==
On October 29, 1951, Lux Video Theatre presented the episode, "The Doctor's Wife", written by Starr. The actors were June Lockhart, George Hill, Grace Valentine, Joseph Buloff, Luba Kaddison, Jean Sincere, and Philippa Bevans.
