= Brooke Wentz =

- Born: Brooke Marie Wentz; United States
- Occupations: Record producer; Music director
- Labels: Arista Records; Seven Seas Music

Brooke Wentz is an American record producer and music director, and author. She has served as a music director for ESPN. She was also the recipient of the Billboard Music Award for the best world music album in 1994, Global Meditation - Authentic Music from Meditative Traditions of the World.

== Education ==
Wentz graduated magna cum laude from Barnard College. She also graduated with an M.B.A. from Columbia University.

== Career ==
Wentz began her career in the 1980s as a public radio host for stations such as New York's WKCR-FM, where she hosted the music program Transfigured Night. She eventually became new music director of WKCR.

After her career in public radio, Wentz served as Manager of A&R Administration at Arista Records. While visiting the FESPACO Film Festival in Burkina Faso, Wentz was an eyewitness to the events of the 1991 Malian coup d'etat alongside Malian musician Salif Keita. She wrote about the incident in an article for the music periodical The Beat.

In 1992, Wentz produced the compilation album Global Meditation. The album featured meditative music from several world religious traditions. Global Meditation went on to win the Billboard Music Award for best world music album in 1994. In 1994, Wentz produced another compilation album of African music, titled Africa: Never Stand Still. In 1995, Wentz also produced the compilation album Global Divas, which featured contributions from female artists such as Patsy Cline, Aretha Franklin, Lydia Mendoza, and Celia Cruz. The album was produced to promote the United Nations Fourth World Conference on Women.

By 1996, Wentz had become the music director of ESPN. Wentz was one of the first music directors who licensed music for the X Games and supervised a compilation album for the event.

In 2000, Wentz also served as the music producer for New York City's Times Square Millennium Celebration. In 2002, Wentz founded the music supervision company The Rights Workshop. The Rights Workshop has provided music for film and television productions including Melancholia, Bill Cunningham New York, and Don't Stop Believin': Everyman's Journey.

In 2007, Wentz's first book, Hey, That's My Music! Music Supervision, Licensing, and Content Acquisition was published by Hal Leonard Books.

Wentz founded Seven Seas Music in 2014. Seven Seas Music has licensed music for use films such as the films No Escape and Knight of Cups, as well as the television series Anthony Bourdain: Parts Unknown and Criminal Minds.

Wentz's second book, Music Rights Unveiled: A Filmmaker's Guide to Music Rights and Licensing, was published in 2017 by Taylor & Francis. She co-wrote the book in collaboration with Maryam Battaglia.

In 2019, Wentz produced the compilation album This Is Syria to support the International Rescue Committee's Syrian relief efforts. In 2020, Wentz produced the album “Annapurna's Song,” which is a compilation of artists from the Himalayas and included a track by Grateful Dead singer and guitarist Jerry Garcia, Indian guitarist Sanjay Mishra, and composer A.R. Rahman. The song was released for charity and benefited the American Himalayan Foundation.

In 2023, Wentz published the book Transfigured New York: Interviews with Experimental Artists and Musicians, 1980-1990 through Columbia University Press. A launch event was held for the book at the Roulette Intermedium in New York on November 13, 2023. The book contained interviews with musicians such as John Cage, Philip Glass, Living Colour, and Baaba Maal.The interviews were conducted during her time as the host of the radio program Transfigured Night on Columbia University's WKCR-FM radio station. The book was featured in the 481th issue of the music magazine The Wire. In December 2023, Wentz's interview with avant-garde artist Laurie Anderson from the book was published in Literary Hub. In January 2024, Bad Feeling Magazine named Transfigured New York to its list of the best pop culture books of 2023.

Wentz has served as a creative advisor for the Sundance Institute Film Music & Sound Design Lab at Skywalker Sound. In 2025, she produced the documentary film Janis Ian: Breaking Silence.

== Discography ==
| Year | Title | Artist | Credits |
|---|---|---|---|
| 1990 | Music from the Heart | Various Artists | Producer |
| 1991 | Global Celebration: Passages | Various Artists | Producer, Compilation Producer |
| 1992 | Global Celebration: Dancing with the Gods | Various Artists | Compilation Producer |
| 1992 | Global Meditation, Vol. 2: Harmony & Interplay | Various Artists | Producer |
| 1992 | Global Meditation, Vol. 4: Music From the Heart | Various Artists | Producer |
| 1992 | Global Meditation - Authentic Music from Meditative Traditions of the World | Various Artists | Producer |
| 1992 | Les Ambassadeurs Internationales with Salif Keita | Les Ambassadeurs and Salif Keita | Liner Notes |
| 1992 | Nocturne Parisian | Graham Haynes & No Image | Associate Producer |
| 1993 | Global Celebration (Authentic Music from Festivals & Celebrations Around the World) | Various Artists | Producer, Engineer, Composer |
| 1993 | Sketches of Miles | Byron Olson | Coordination |
| 1993 | Voices of Forgotten Worlds: Traditional Music of Indigenous Peoples | Various Artists | Producer |
| 1994 | Africa: Never Stand Still | Various Artists | Producer |
| 1994 | Dance of the Leaves (Restless/Enigma) | Toure Kunda | Liner Notes |
| 1994 | Global Celebration: Gatherings | Various Artists | Producer, Compilation Producer, Composer |
| 1994 | Saints & Sinners | Jean-Paul Borrelly | Field Recording |
| 1995 | Global Divas | Various Artists | Producer, Compilation Producer, Liner Notes |
| 1996 | Divas of Mali | Various Artists | Producer |
| 1996 | The X Games: The Compilation Album | Various Artists | Music Supervisor |
| 1996 | X-Games, Vol. 1: Music from the Edge | Various Artists | Music Supervisor |
| 1997 | Best of Ellipsis Arts | Various Artists | Producer, Liner Notes |
| 1997 | Divine Divas: A World of Women's Voices | Various Artists | Compilation Producer |
| 1997 | The Best of Ellipsis Arts: Africa | Various Artists | Producer, Liner Notes |
| 1998 | Best of Ellipsis Arts: Global Celebration | Various Artists | Editing, Liner Notes |
| 1998 | Best of Ellipsis Arts: Global Meditation | Various Artists | Producer |
| 1999 | An American Love Story (Original Soundtrack) | Various Artists | Music Supervisor |
| 1999 | Back to Our Roots, Vol. 1 | Too Bad | Executive Producer |
| 1999 | Passion Planet: Songs of Love from Around the World | Various Artists | Producer, Compilation Producer |
| 1999 | Wonders of the African World | Various Artists | Producer, Music Supervisor |
| 2000 | Celebration! Times Square 2000 | Various Artists | Producer |
| 2000 | Dan Gna | Les Go | Executive Producer |
| 2019 | This Is Syria | Various Artists | Producer |
| 2020 | “Annapurna's Song” | Various Artists | Producer |
