= Bill Jersey =

American documentary filmmaker (1927–2026)

- Born: January 1, 1927; New York City, U.S.
- Died: July 24, 2026 (aged 99); Lambertville, New Jersey, U.S.
- Occupations: Documentary filmmaker, Painter
- Spouse: Shirley Kessler
- Children: 5
- Awards: Peabody Award (2); Emmy Award (Multiple); DuPont-Columbia Award (2)
- Website: www.billjersey.com

William Clifford Jersey Jr. (June 9, 1927 – July 24, 2026) was an American documentary filmmaker and painter. He was a leading figure in the history of American documentary filmmaking and a pioneer of the cinéma vérité movement. Over a career that spanned more than six decades, Jersey produced a large body of work. His films probed fractured and sensitive areas of the American experience such as racism, religious fundamentalism, gang violence, judicial activism, and the psychology of war.

Jersey's contribution to the documentary form is defined by his approach to "act of faith" filmmaking, a methodology that rejects scripted narratives in favor of capturing the spontaneous truths of human interaction. This approach yielded his seminal work, A Time for Burning (1966), a film that documented the Civil Rights struggles within the Lutheran Church and became a historical artifact inducted into the Library of Congress National Film Registry. His work has garnered the industry's highest honors, including two Academy Award nominations, two George Foster Peabody Awards, and multiple Emmy Awards.

== Early life ==
=== Childhood ===
William Clifford Jersey Jr. was born in Jamaica, New York on June 9, 1927. He was raised in a household defined by strict religious fundamentalism. The theological framework of his childhood viewed secular entertainment as morally corrosive. Consequently, the young Jersey was forbidden from participating in the common cultural touchstones of his generation: he could not dance, drink, smoke, swear, play cards, or—most significantly for his future career—attend motion pictures.

=== Naval service and cinematic awakening ===
At the age of 17, during World War II, Jersey enlisted in the United States Navy. He was deployed to the South Pacific aboard the USS Arkansas. It was aboard the USS Arkansas that Jersey experienced a revelation that would alter the trajectory of his life. Onboard he attended a shipboard screening where he watched a film for the very first time. The medium of film offered what his upbringing had denied: a portal to other worlds, a method of emotional transport, and a language for storytelling that transcended the written word.

=== Artistic training ===
Upon his discharge, Jersey utilized the G.I. Bill to pursue higher education. He enrolled at Wheaton College in Illinois, a private evangelical liberal arts college, majoring in art. Following Wheaton, Jersey moved to Los Angeles to attend the University of Southern California (USC), home to one of the country's oldest and most prestigious film schools. At USC, he immersed himself in the mechanics of filmmaking, blending his artistic eye with the narrative demands of editing and direction. He graduated with a Master of Arts in Cinema in 1956.

== Career ==
=== Beginnings (1950s) ===
Following graduation from USC, Jersey took jobs as an art director on various films. His most famous credit from this period is the 1958 science fiction horror film The Blob. Directed by Irvin Yeaworth and starring a young Steve McQueen, the film became a cult classic. As Art Director, Jersey was responsible for the film’s distinctive look, capturing the eerie, small-town Americana that is disrupted by the gelatinous alien entity.

Jersey also served as Art Director for Manhunt in the Jungle (1958), an adventure film set in the Amazon, and 4D Man (1959), a sci-fi thriller about a scientist who can pass through solid matter. Jersey also worked for Good News Productions in Valley Forge, Pennsylvania, a production company that specialized in films for Christian audiences, primarily as an art director.

Working on feature films left Jersey artistically unfulfilled. He found the process of working with scripted actors and artificial sets to be limiting. He yearned for a connection to the "real world," finding the unscripted lives of ordinary people more compelling than the contrivances of fiction. This realization prompted his permanent shift away from narrative features into documentary filmmaking.

=== Early documentary career (1960s–1970s) ===
In 1960, Jersey founded Quest Productions, an independent production company that would serve as the vehicle for his creative vision for the next sixty years. The name "Quest" was emblematic of his philosophy: filmmaking as a search for truth rather than a manufacturing of entertainment.

Quest Productions initially sustained itself by producing industrial films for major American corporations, including Western Electric, Exxon, and Johnson & Johnson. In the 1960s, industrial filmmaking was a massive sector, often producing dry, instructional, or purely promotional content. Jersey, however, refused to act as a mere advertiser for his clients and rather approached these corporate assignments with the eye of a journalist. He took risks, aiming to understand the companies better than they understood themselves. This subversive integrity allowed him to experiment with narrative techniques and human-centric storytelling within the corporate structure, refining the skills he would soon apply to social issues.

==== Manhattan Battleground (1963) ====
Jersey’s transition to broadcast television began with Manhattan Battleground, a one-hour documentary produced for NBC-TV’s prestigious The DuPont Show of the Week. The film profiled Dan Morrow, a social worker operating in the socially fractured neighborhoods of 111th Street in Harlem. Unlike the detached, authoritative "voice-of-God" documentaries common at the time, Manhattan Battleground was immersive. It followed Morrow into the streets, capturing the dramatic and often painful interactions between the social worker and the community he served. The film was a critical sensation, praised for its raw honesty and dramatic tension. It earned Jersey his first Emmy Award for Outstanding Achievement in the Field of Documentary Programs in 1964.

==== A Time For Burning (1966) ====
Jersey’s seminal film was A Time for Burning, released in 1966. Commissioned by the Lutheran Church in America (LCA), the film was intended to be a document of the church’s engagement with racial issues during the height of the Civil Rights Movement. The church expected a reassuring portrait of ecclesiastical benevolence; Jersey delivered a devastating mirror of institutional failure and personal anguish.

The film is set in Omaha, Nebraska, and follows the Reverend L. William Youngdahl, the pastor of the all-white Augustana Lutheran Church who attempts to integrate with a nearby Black Lutheran congregation. Jersey approached the project with a rigorous commitment to cinéma vérité. He rejected the use of a script, narrators, or staged interviews. When church officials expressed concern about the lack of a script, asking how they would know what they were paying for, Jersey replied, "You don't know. We don't know. To me, filmmaking is an act of faith".

The resulting film documents the failure of Youngdahl’s initiative. The congregation pushes back, and Youngdahl is eventually forced to resign. When released, the film was considered too controversial for many television networks initially. It exposed the "institutional and personal racism" of "pious, upstanding Middle America". Later, it received widespread recognition and was nominated for an Academy Award for Best Documentary Feature in 1967. In 2005, it was selected for preservation in the United States National Film Registry by the Library of Congress as being "culturally, historically, or aesthetically significant". It is regarded today as one of the most important civil rights films ever made and a textbook example of the power of observational cinema.

==== Six American Families: The Kennedys (1978) ====
As part of a larger series, Jersey directed the episode focusing on the Kennedy family (not the political dynasty, but a regular American family). The film documents a family in Albuquerque, New Mexico, coping with a child with intellectual disabilities. It explores themes of "retardation, women's liberation, competition and family relations". This work contributed to Jersey winning the DuPont-Columbia Journalism Award.

=== Later career (1980s–2000s) ===
In the later phase of his career, Jersey began to produce large-scale historical documentaries and biographies for public television (PBS), often tackling subjects like the Supreme Court, the Cold War, and the Jim Crow era.

==== Children of Violence (1982) ====
In the early 1980s, Jersey turned his lens to the Chicano community in Oakland, California. Children of Violence is an intimate, vérité portrait of a family grappling with the pervasive influence of street gangs. The film centers on the children of the family, particularly the teenagers who are drawn into the "complex web of teenage violence". It eschews sensationalism, instead focusing on the emotional toll violence takes on the family unit and the limited choices available to these young men. The film won a News & Documentary Emmy Award. It remains a historical document of urban life and the cyclical nature of violence in underserved communities.

==== Faces of the Enemy (1987) ====
Shifting from domestic issues to global geopolitics, Jersey produced and directed Faces of the Enemy, a psychological investigation into the nature of war. Based on the work of philosopher Sam Keen, the film explores how nations and individuals construct the image of an "enemy" to justify killing. It examines the propaganda, rhetoric, and psychological mechanisms used to dehumanize opponents. The film was nominated for an Emmy Award and is frequently used in educational settings to teach conflict resolution and media literacy.

==== Super Chief: The Life and Legacy of Earl Warren (1989) ====
Co-directed with Judith Leonard, this film is a comprehensive biography of Earl Warren, the Chief Justice of the United States whose court ended legal segregation in Brown v. Board of Education. The film traces Warren's evolution from a conservative California governor who supported the internment of Japanese Americans to the liberal icon of the Supreme Court. It received an Academy Award nomination for Best Documentary Feature. Narrated by Gregory Peck, the film is cited as a definitive account of Warren's legal impact.

==== The First Fifty Years: Reflections on U.S.-Soviet Relations (1993) ====
As the Cold War ended, Jersey produced this documentary to analyze the history of the superpower conflict. The film featured interviews with key historical figures, including Richard Nixon, George F. Kennan, and W. Averell Harriman. It was honored with the DuPont-Columbia Silver Baton, recognizing its excellence in broadcast journalism.

==== Loyalty and Betrayal: The Story of the American Mob (1994) ====
Venturing into commercial television, Jersey produced this two-part, four-hour special for FOX. Based on the work of Sidney Zion, it provided an insider's history of organized crime in America, from the immigrant slums of the 1890s to the fall of John Gotti. The film combined archival footage with rare interviews. It won a Primetime Emmy Award for Outstanding Individual Achievement in Editing (shared with his editing team).

==== The Rise and Fall of Jim Crow (2002) ====
Perhaps his most ambitious historical project, this four-part series for PBS was a landmark television event. The series covers the century-long struggle from the end of the Civil War to the beginning of the modern Civil Rights movement (1865–1954). It chronicles the imposition of segregation laws and the African American resistance to them. Jersey served as Series Producer and Director, working with Richard Wormser and Sam Pollard. The series won the Peabody Award, the highest honor in broadcast journalism, for its "comprehensive and compelling" history. It also received two Emmy nominations and the IDA Best Limited Series award.

==== Eames: The Architect and the Painter (2011) ====
Returning to his roots in art and design, Jersey co-produced and directed this feature documentary on Charles and Ray Eames, the husband-and-wife team who revolutionized modern architecture and furniture design. The film explores their chaotic, creative partnership and their massive influence on 20th-century aesthetics. It was broadcast as part of the American Masters series on PBS. The New York Times called it "lively, gratifying... organized with hectic elegance". The film won Jersey his second Peabody Award in 2012.

== Artistic philosophy ==
Jersey's filmmaking is united by a consistent philosophical thread: the belief that truth is found in the connection between people. He views the camera not as a barrier, but as a bridge. Jersey is a proponent of the "Real" over the "Scripted", saying "if you really care about people, they will know it, and they will open themselves up to you".

His work is also characterized by visual storytelling, with his background as a painter informing his cinematography. In A Time for Burning, the stark black-and-white photography emphasizes the stark racial binary of the subject matter. Finally, his work has been noted for its accessibility; Jersey has been ascribed the ability to translate complex abstract ideas into human stories, grounding high concepts in the lived experiences of the people who discovered or lived them.

== Painting ==
Jersey was also a noted artist who worked principally in oils on canvas. Jersey’s paintings are primarily landscapes. His style can be described as interpretive realism. He did not aim for a photorealistic copy of nature but rather an emotional interpretation of it through color and light. He cited Edward Hopper as a key influence, particularly Hopper's mastery of light and shadow.

== Personal life and death ==
Jersey resided in Lambertville, New Jersey at the end of his life.

Jersey died on July 24, 2026, at the age of 99. He was survived by his wife, Shirley Kessler, and five children: Beth, Todd, Brian, Colin and Joshua.

== Filmography ==
Year	Title	Role	Format/Network	Description	Awards
1963	Manhattan Battleground	Director/Producer	NBC (DuPont Show)	Profile of social worker Dan Morrow in Harlem.	Emmy Award Winner
1966	A Time for Burning	Director/Producer	Theatrical/LCA	Cinema vérité study of a segregated Lutheran church.	Oscar Nominee, Nat'l Film Registry
1978	Six American Families: The Kennedys	Director/Producer	PBS	Portrait of a family with a special needs child.	DuPont-Columbia Award
1982	Children of Violence	Director/Producer	PBS	Documentary on Chicano youth gangs in Oakland.	Emmy Award Winner
1987	Faces of the Enemy	Producer/Director	PBS	Exploration of the psychology of war and propaganda.	Emmy Nominee
1989	Super Chief: The Life and Legacy of Earl Warren	Co-Director	Theatrical/PBS	Biography of Chief Justice Earl Warren.	Oscar Nominee
1992	The Glory and the Power	Series Producer	PBS/BBC	3-part series on global religious fundamentalism.	Emmy Nominee
1993	The First Fifty Years	Director/Producer	PBS	History of U.S.-Soviet relations.	DuPont-Columbia Award
1994	Loyalty and Betrayal: The Story of the American Mob	Co-Producer/Editor	FOX	4-hour history of organized crime in America.	Emmy Award Winner
1997	Renaissance	Series Producer	PBS	5-part series on the history of the Renaissance.	Emmy Nominee
2001	Crime & Punishment in America	Director/Producer	PBS	Adaptation of Lawrence Friedman's legal history.	
2002	The Rise and Fall of Jim Crow	Series Producer	PBS	4-part history of segregation in the American South.	Peabody Award Winner
2002	The Making of Amadeus	Director	DVD Special	Retrospective on the filming of Miloš Forman's Amadeus.	Cine Golden Eagle
2005	Ending AIDS: The Search for a Vaccine	Director/Producer	PBS	Scientific documentary on AIDS research.	
2007	Campus Battleground	Director/Producer	PBS/WETA	Student activism at Berkeley and Columbia.	
2008	Hunting the Hidden Dimension	Director/Producer	PBS (NOVA)	Investigation into fractal geometry.	Pierre-Gilles de Gennes Award
2009	Abraham Lincoln: A New Birth of Freedom	Director/Producer	PBS	Biography of Abraham Lincoln narrated by Andrew Young.	Cine Golden Eagle
2011	Eames: The Architect and the Painter	Co-Producer/Director	PBS (Am. Masters)	Life and work of Charles and Ray Eames.	Peabody Award Winner
N/A	We The People	Director/Producer	PBS	4-part series on the U.S. Constitution.	Cindy Award, Ohio State Award
N/A	Stopwatch	Director/Producer	PBS	Based on The One Best Way (Frederick Winslow Taylor).	
N/A	Maya Angelou: Rainbow in the Clouds	Director/Producer	PBS	Special featuring the poet Maya Angelou.	Gabriel Award

== Awards and accolades ==
Year	Award Organization	Award Category	Nominated Work	Result
1964	Primetime Emmy Awards	Documentary Program Achievement	Manhattan Battleground	Won
1967	Academy Awards (Oscars)	Best Documentary Feature	A Time for Burning	Nominated
1978	DuPont-Columbia Awards	Broadcast Journalism	Six American Families	Won
1982	News & Documentary Emmy Awards	Outstanding Documentary	Children of Violence	Won
1987	News & Documentary Emmy Awards	Outstanding Documentary	Faces of the Enemy	Nominated
1989	Academy Awards (Oscars)	Best Documentary Feature	Super Chief	Nominated
1993	DuPont-Columbia Awards	Silver Baton	The First Fifty Years	Won
1995	News & Documentary Emmy Awards	Individual Achievement (Editing)	Loyalty and Betrayal	Won
1997	News & Documentary Emmy Awards	Outstanding Series	Renaissance	Nominated
2002	George Foster Peabody Awards	Award of Excellence	The Rise and Fall of Jim Crow	Won
2008	Paris Science Film Festival	Pierre-Gilles de Gennes Award	Hunting the Hidden Dimension	Won
2011	George Foster Peabody Awards	Award of Excellence	Eames: The Architect and the Painter	Won
2012	National Arts Club	Gold Medal	Career Achievement	Won
2005	Library of Congress	National Film Registry	A Time for Burning	Inducted
