= Super Chief: The Life and Legacy of Earl Warren =

1989 film

- Directed by: Bill Jersey; Judith Leonard
- Produced by: Bill Jersey; Judith Leonard
- Narrated by: Gregory Peck
- Cinematography: Bill Jersey
- Edited by: Gary Weimberg
- Music by: Mark Adler
- Distributed by: Direct Cinema
- Release date: 1989
- Running time: 88 minutes
- Country: United States
- Language: English

Super Chief: The Life and Legacy of Earl Warren is a 1989 American documentary film directed by Bill Jersey and Judith Leonard about controversial Chief Justice Earl Warren.

== Cast ==
- Gregory Peck as narrator
- Robert Bork
- William Brennan
- Thurgood Marshall
- Arthur Miller

== Accolades ==
It was nominated for an Academy Award for Best Documentary Feature.

== See also ==
- Brown vs. Board of Education of Topeka
- Dwight D. Eisenhower
- Internment of Japanese Americans
