= Galais =

Galai is a French surname. Notable people with the surname include:

- Bernard Galais (1921–2009), French classical harpist and composer
- Jennifer Galais (born 1992), French athlete

== Fictional characters ==
- Yvonne de Galais, from the novel Le Grand Meaulnes and films based on it

== See also ==
- Galai
