= Gene Kelly: Anatomy of a Dancer =

2002 television film

Gene Kelly: Anatomy of a Dancer is a documentary on the life and death of Gene Kelly. It was shown on American Masters on PBS in 2002.
