= Janis Ian: Breaking Silence =

2024 documentary film directed by Varda Bar-Kar

- Directed by: Varda Bar-Kar
- Written by: Varda Bar-Kar; Pierre Hauser
- Produced by: Varda Bar-Kar; Alessandra Pasquino; Brooke Wentz
- Starring: Janis Ian; Joan Baez; Lily Tomlin; Arlo Guthrie; Laurie Metcalf
- Cinematography: Matthew Steven Wilder
- Edited by: Ryan Larkin
- Music by: Janis Ian; David Melchor
- Distributed by: Greenwich Entertainment
- Release dates: November 2024 (Doc NYC); March 28, 2025 (United States)
- Running time: 114 minutes
- Country: United States
- Language: English
- Box office: $47,749

Janis Ian: Breaking Silence is a 2024 American documentary film directed by Varda Bar-Kar that covers the life and career of singer-songwriter Janis Ian. Janis Ian: Breaking Silence examines Ian's early success with her lightening rod song "Society's Child" in the 1960s, her enduring music career, and her rollercoaster life over six decades. It includes interviews with Ian, Joan Baez, Arlo Guthrie, Lily Tomlin, and Jean Smart. The documentary premiered at Doc NYC in November 2024 and was released theatrically in the United States on March 28, 2025, by Greenwich Entertainment.

== Synopsis ==
The film follows Janis Ian’s life from her New Jersey childhood to her debut with "Society's Child" (1966), which stirred controversy over interracial love, and her 1970s hit "At Seventeen." The film weaves together archival footage, performance footage, recreations, animation, and interviews to span six decades, exploring her career breakthroughs and challenges, her 1993 coming out with Breaking Silence, and her 2022 tour cancellation due to vocal scarring.

== Production ==
Director Varda Bar-Kar contacted Janis Ian to propose the documentary, and after initial reluctance, Ian agreed; the film uses interviews, archival footage, performance footage, reenactments, and animation, filmed in New Jersey, New York, Nashville, San Francisco, and Los Angeles, with an extensive soundtrack featuring Ian’s songs like "Society's Child" and "At Seventeen," "Stars" and "Some People's Lives", with an original score by David Melchor.

== Release ==
The film premiered at DOC NYC in November 2024. Greenwich Entertainment acquired U.S. distribution rights in February 2025, setting a theatrical release for March 28, 2025. It screened at festivals like the Palm Springs International Film Festival winning a "Best of the Fest" award and the San Francisco Jewish Film Festival. A live broadcast aired through AARP Movies for Grownups on December 5, 2024, and the film will be available online and on DVD beginning on April 29, 2025. On June 20, 2025, The film was featured in a United States National Broadcast Premiere on the PBS series American Masters.

== Reception ==
The Washington Post said, “Breaking Silence” does a lot right" closing with "Ian’s songs offer all the truth we need." Rolling Stone commented that "Bar-Kar tells this tale of love, loss, and life-altering lyricism with the same tenderness of Ian’s songwriting. Even if you’re not a fan, you might be moved to tears." Billboard writes, "Bar-Kar’s engrossing, informative documentary does that superbly. Watching the film, one gets as much of a sense of America’s complicated, shifting identity over the decades as one does Ian’s own life and personal evolution."
