= A Time for Burning =

1966 documentary film

- Directed by: William C. Jersey
- Produced by: William C. Jersey
- Starring: Rev. L. William Youngdahl, Ernie Chambers, Ray Cristensen
- Cinematography: William C. Jersey
- Music by: Barry Kornfeld
- Production companies: Quest Productions; Avernus Productions
- Distributed by: Lutheran Film Associates
- Release date: 1966
- Running time: 56 minutes
- Country: United States
- Language: English

A Time for Burning is a 1966 American documentary film that explores the attempts of the minister of Augustana Lutheran Church in Omaha, Nebraska, to persuade his all-white congregation to reach out to "Negro" Lutherans in the city's north side. The film was directed by San Francisco filmmaker William C. Jersey and was nominated for Best Documentary Feature in the 1967 Academy Awards.

== Summary ==
The film was commissioned by the Lutheran Church in America.

The film was shot in 1965 in "cinéma vérité" style. It chronicles the relationship between the minister, L. William Youngdahl (1927-2012), and his white and black Lutheran parishioners. Youngdahl was the son of former Minnesota governor and federal judge Luther Youngdahl. The film includes a meeting between Youngdahl and a black barber, Ernie Chambers, who tells Youngdahl that his Jesus is "contaminated." At one point another Omaha Lutheran minister, Walter E. Rowoldt of Luther Memorial Lutheran Church, says, "This one lady said to me, 'pastor', she said, 'I want them to have everything I have, I want God to bless them as much as he blesses me, but', she says, 'pastor, I just can't be in the same room with them, it just bothers me'." Rowoldt and other ministers also discuss the concern that blacks moving into white neighborhoods will decrease property values.

The attempt to reach out does not succeed and Youngdahl resigns as minister of the church.

== Legacy ==
In 2005, A Time for Burning was selected for preservation in the United States National Film Registry by the Library of Congress as "culturally, historically, or aesthetically significant".

Chambers completed law school and was elected to the Nebraska Legislature in 1970. He served as Nebraska's 11th District's representative until 2008, when a new term-limit law was implemented. He was reelected in 2012 and served until 2021. Chambers is the longest-serving state senator in Nebraska history.

The film and its director are featured prominently in Nick Beaulieu's 2025 documentary My Omaha, which aired on PBS's Independent Lens in October 2026.

== See also ==
- Civil rights movement in popular culture
- List of American films of 1966
- Timeline of riots and civil unrest in Omaha, Nebraska
- Racial Tension in Omaha, Nebraska
