= Asaf Galay =

Israeli-American documentary director, producer, and curator

Asaf Galay (Hebrew: אסף גלאי; born April 9, 1978) is an Israeli-American documentary director, producer, and curator.

Asaf Galay was born in Chicago, Illinois, and raised in Tel Aviv, Israel. He currently resides and works in both Tel Aviv and Massachusetts, United States.

== Career ==
=== Documentary Films ===
In 2014, Galay directed and produced The Muses of Bashevis Singer. The documentary, aired in Israel on Yes Docu, focuses on the life of Nobel Prize-winning author Isaac Bashevis Singer and the women who translated his works from Yiddish.

In 2015, Galay directed The Hebrew Superhero. This film, broadcast in Israel on Channel 8, explores the development and influence of Israeli comic books.

In 2018, Galay directed Army of Lovers in the Holy Land, a documentary that follows the Aliyah of Jean-Pierre Barda, a member of the Swedish pop band Army of Lovers. The film, supported by the Makor Foundation for Israeli Films, was broadcast on Channel 8 and won the Best Documentary Award at the 2018 Haifa International Film Festival. Haaretz critic Nirit Anderman noted that the film "dominated the documentary scene" at the festival with its "light-hearted, lively, and cheerful" portrayal of the band.

In 2022, Galay directed The Adventures of Saul Bellow, a documentary about the American author Saul Bellow, which aired as part of PBS's American Masters series. During the production, Galay conducted one of the last interviews with author Philip Roth. The documentary won first place at several film festivals, including the Chelsea Film Festival, and was a finalist for the Ken Burns/Library of Congress Award.

In 2024, Galay was awarded the sixth annual Library of Congress–Ken Burns Prize for Cartooning America, a documentary about the Fleischer brothers, pioneering animators known for creating Betty Boop, Popeye, and the first animated adaptation of Superman. The prize included a $200,000 cash award.

=== Curation ===
Galay has been a senior curator at ANU – Museum of the Jewish People since 2010. He has curated numerous exhibitions, including "And There Was Laughter," which focused on Jewish humor, as well as exhibitions on Amy Winehouse, Bob Dylan, photographer David Seymour, and Jewish fashion designers. Galay has also contributed to the curation of the museum's permanent exhibition and written materials for the museum.
