= Varda Bar-Kar =

Director, writer, and producer in California

- Occupations: Film director, writer, producer
- Years active: 2005–present

Varda Bar-Kar is a film director, writer, and producer based in Santa Monica, California. She is best known for her short film Window, her viral video What Kind of Planet Are We On?, her documentary Big Voice, 9-1-1 (TV series), and her documentary Fandango at the Wall and Janis Ian: Breaking Silence.

== Life and career ==
Varda was born in London, England to a South African mother and Romanian father. She holds a BA in theater arts from Cornell University and an MFA in film studies from the San Francisco Art Institute (SFAI). She worked as a script supervisor for directors Jim Jarmusch, Wayne Wang and Carroll Ballard.

In 2015, Varda's feature documentary, Big Voice, won Best Premiere Documentary at the Heartland Film Festival and the 2018 PBS SoCal broadcast of Big Voice won a Bronze Telly Award. She is a member of the DGA, Film Fatales and the Alliance of Women Directors. In 2024, she wrote and directed ARTBOUND: The Cheech, part of PBS SoCal’s ARTBOUND series, exploring the creation of The Cheech Marin Center for Chicano Art & Culture, featuring interviews with Cheech Marin.

In 2025, Varda released Janis Ian: Breaking Silence, a documentary about singer-songwriter Janis Ian, featuring figures such as Lily Tomlin, Joan Baez, Arlo Guthrie, and Laurie Metcalf. The film is structured around Ian’s albums and explores her personal and professional life.

== Filmography ==
Year	Title	Director	Writer	Producer	Notes
2005	Window	Yes	Yes	No	Short Film
2006	Visiting Shane	Yes	Yes	Yes	Documentary
2006	Moon (The 1,000 Sides of the Moon)	Yes	Yes	Yes	Short Film
2008	Lisette	Yes	Yes	No	Short Film
2008	Runaway Stars	Yes	Yes	No	TV series
2008	Sprung	Yes	No	No	Short Film
2009	Race to the Sky	Yes	No	No	Short Film
2010	What Kind of Planet Are We On?	Yes	Yes	No	Short Film
2010	A Million Spokes	Yes	No	No	Documentary
2011	Journey to Safety	Yes	Yes	No	Short Film
2011	Ode to Los Angeles	Yes	Yes	Yes	Short Film
2013	ForgiveOne	Yes	Yes	Yes	Short Film
2015	Big Voice	Yes	Yes	Yes	Documentary
2018	9-1-1	Yes	No	No	1 episode
2020	Fandango at the Wall	Yes	Yes	No	Documentary
2024	ARTBOUND: The Cheech	Yes	Yes	No	Documentary
2025	Janis Ian: Breaking Silence	Yes	Yes	Yes	Documentary
