= Amram Nowak =

American filmmaker

Amram Nowak (May 12, 1925 – June 6, 2005) was an American film producer, film director and writer. He has produced, directed and/or written about 200 documentary films, two feature films, and several TV specials.

He was married to writer Manya Starr in 1981 or 1982, and they collaborate for many years. They run the film production company Amram Nowak Associates based in Manhattan. Their projects included Isaac in America: A Journey with Isaac Bashevis Singer, which was nominated for an Academy Award in 1987.

== Selected filmography ==
- 1966: John Von Neumann: a documentary
- 1969:King Murray
  A "combination of dramatic and documentary film techniques about an insurance salesman on a gambling junket to Las Vegas"
- 1970:The Nashville Sound
  Starring Johnny Cash, Loretta Lynn, Dolly Parton, and others
- 1984: "The Cafeteria", from American Playhouse, American anthology television series
  based on the short story by Isaac Bashevis Singer
- 1987:Isaac in America: A Journey with Isaac Bashevis Singer
- 1997: They Came for Good: A History of the Jews in the US
  The documentary discusses Asher Levy, Louis Moses Gomez, Rebecca Gratz, Uriah Phillips Levy, Levi Strauss, Isaac Leeser, Isaac Mayer Wise, Judah Benjamin, the Warburgs, the Schiffs, Emma Lazarus, and other personalities.
