= Noam Galai =

Israeli photographer

- נועם גלאי
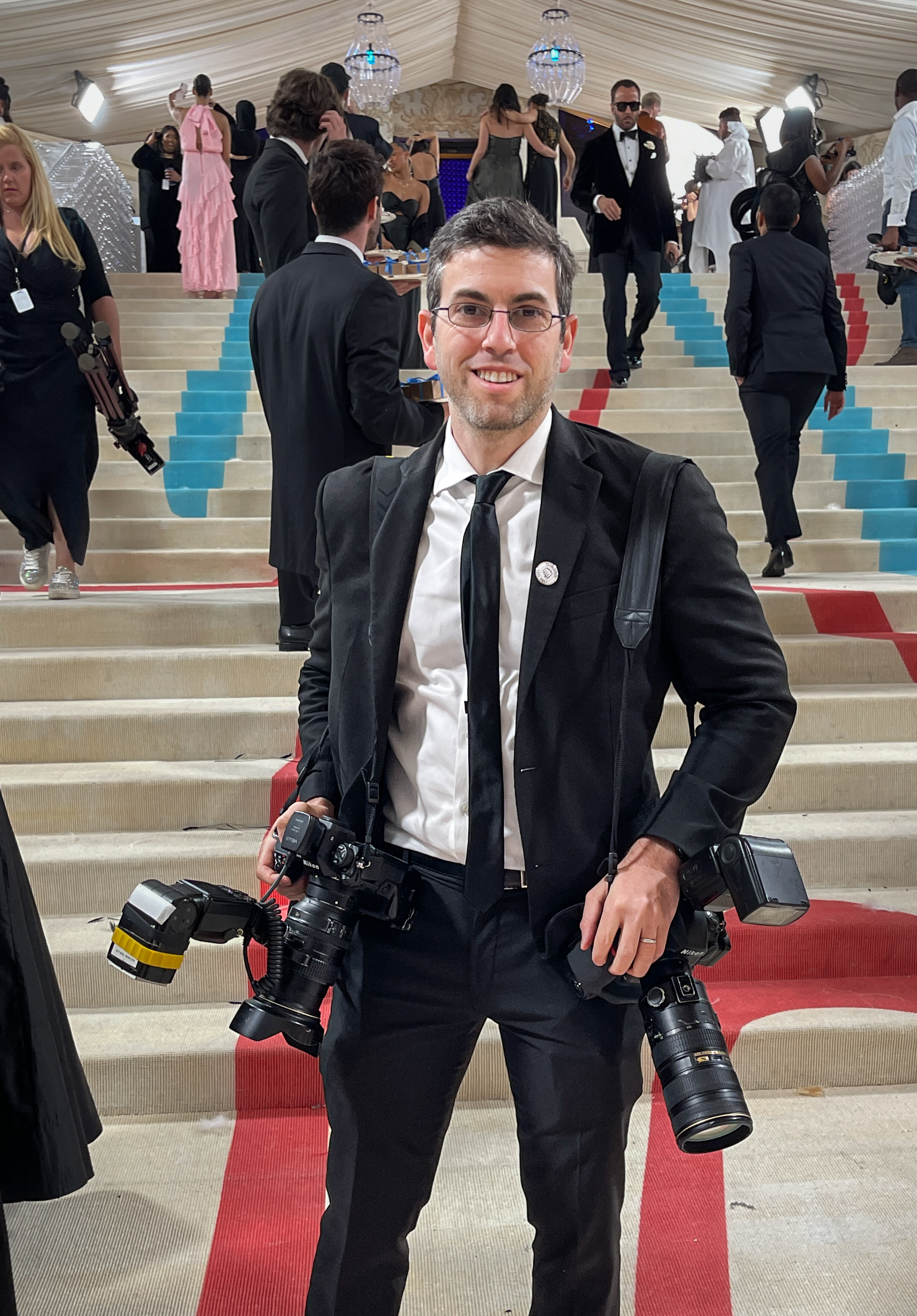
- Noam Galai attends the 2023 Met Gala celebrating "Karl Lagerfeld: A Line of Beauty" at Metropolitan Museum of Art on May 01, 2023 in New York City.
- Website: https://www.noamgalai.com/

Noam Galai (Hebrew: נועם גלאי; born September 9, 1984, in Jerusalem) is an Israeli photographer based in New York City. He is best known for his case of global intellectual property theft of his iconic scream images. He is married and has two children.

== Career ==
Noam Galai started taking pictures professionally when he served in the Israel Defense Forces (IDF), and then in 2005 began photographing for Maccabi Tel Aviv Basketball Club. In January 2006 Noam moved to New York City and pursued his photography career. He continued shooting sports, photographing mainly NBA, WNBA, and Euroleague games; He moved on to work with celebrities, musicians and politicians in the studio and at live events. In 2011 a photo of New York City taken by Noam was Chosen by LIFE Magazine as one of the best photos of the year. In March 2016 Noam Galai's photograph of Donald Trump was used for the cover of Time Magazine.

He currently works with Getty Images and formerly worked at AOL.

== The Stolen Scream ==
In February 2006, Noam took a series of self-portrait images showing himself screaming and posted them online to a photo sharing website. His screaming self-portraits gained popularity, and artists used the self-portraits as inspiration for their own art. Unbeknownst to Noam, his image was used as a symbol of civil unrest appearing on posters and graffiti in many countries such as Iran, Spain, Argentina, Egypt, Iraq and Honduras. Companies also misappropriated the use of his face for financial gain, selling T-shirts, books, magazines, and other paraphernalia. This story was used by news outlets and college textbooks to exemplify the growing debate between the dissemination of intellectual property online and copyright issues. As the story gained notoriety Noam received recognition as the man behind the face of "The Stolen Scream".

== See also ==
- The Scream

== Some photographs by Noam Galai ==
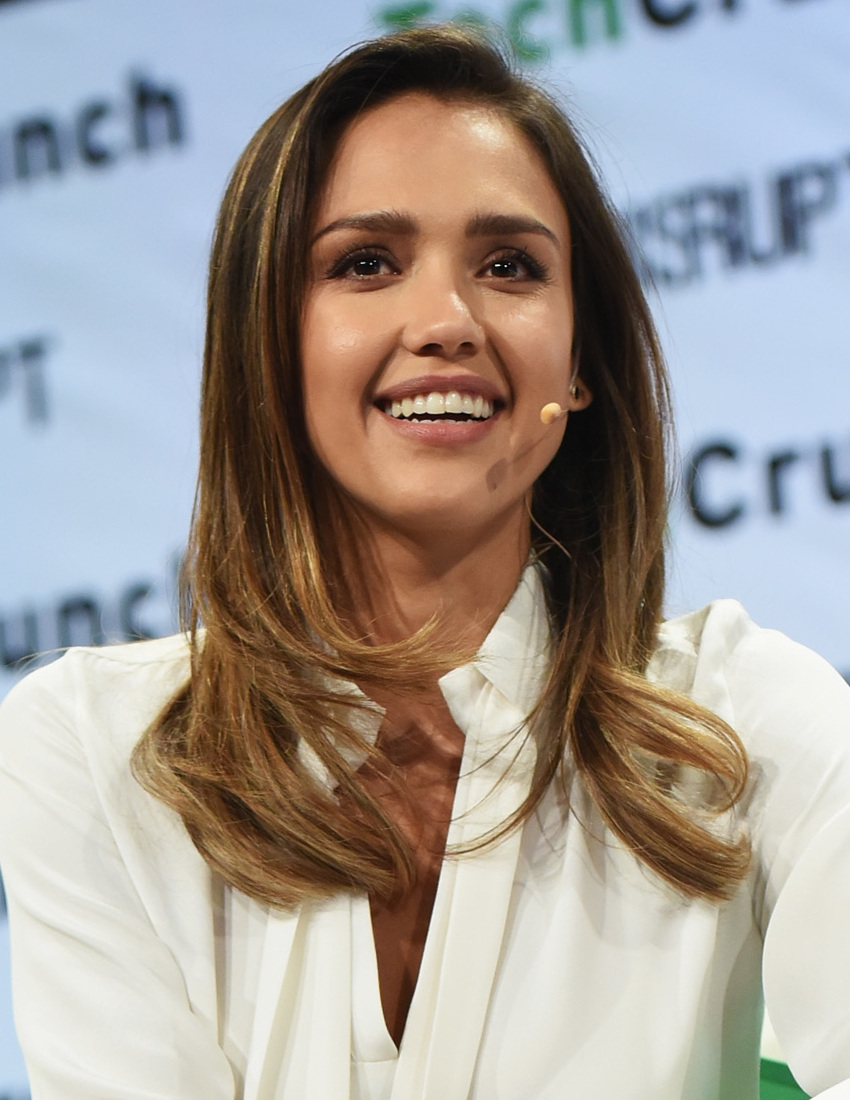
Jessica Alba

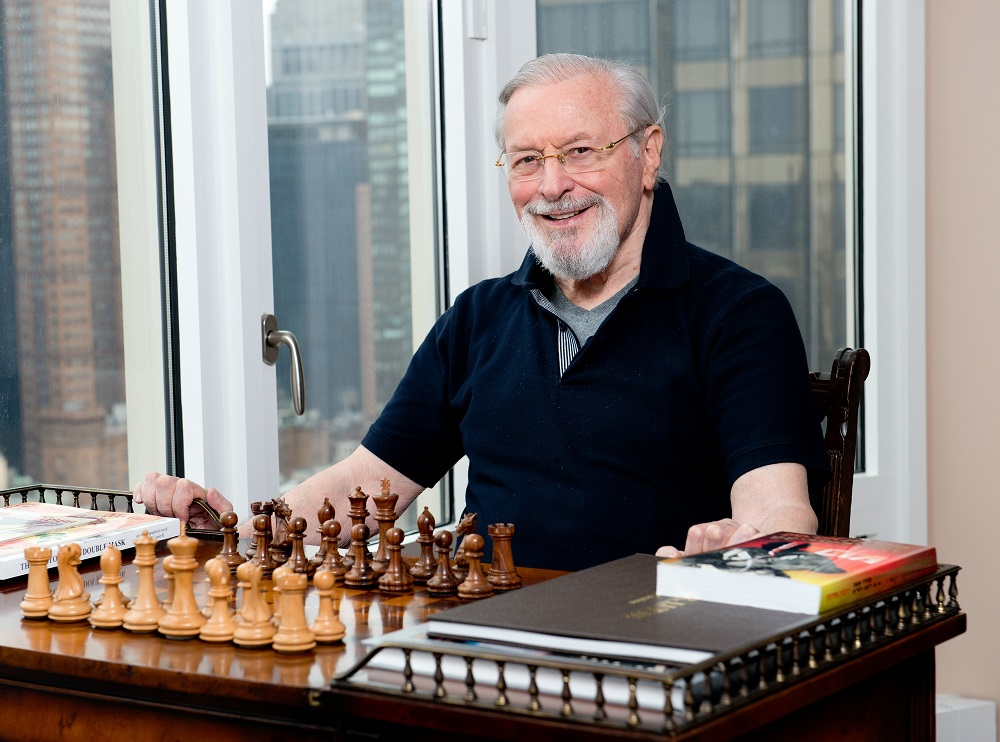
Ranan Lurie

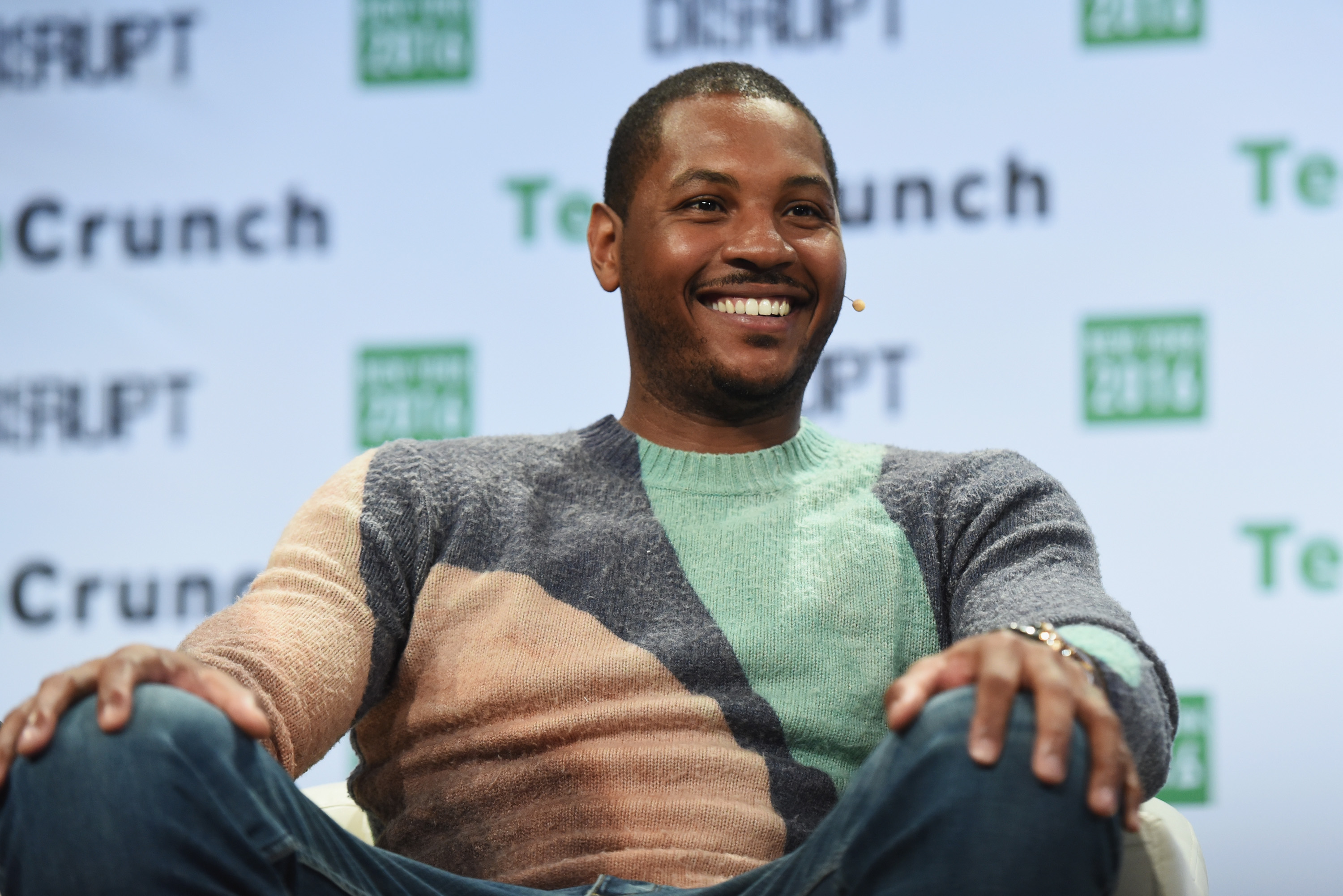

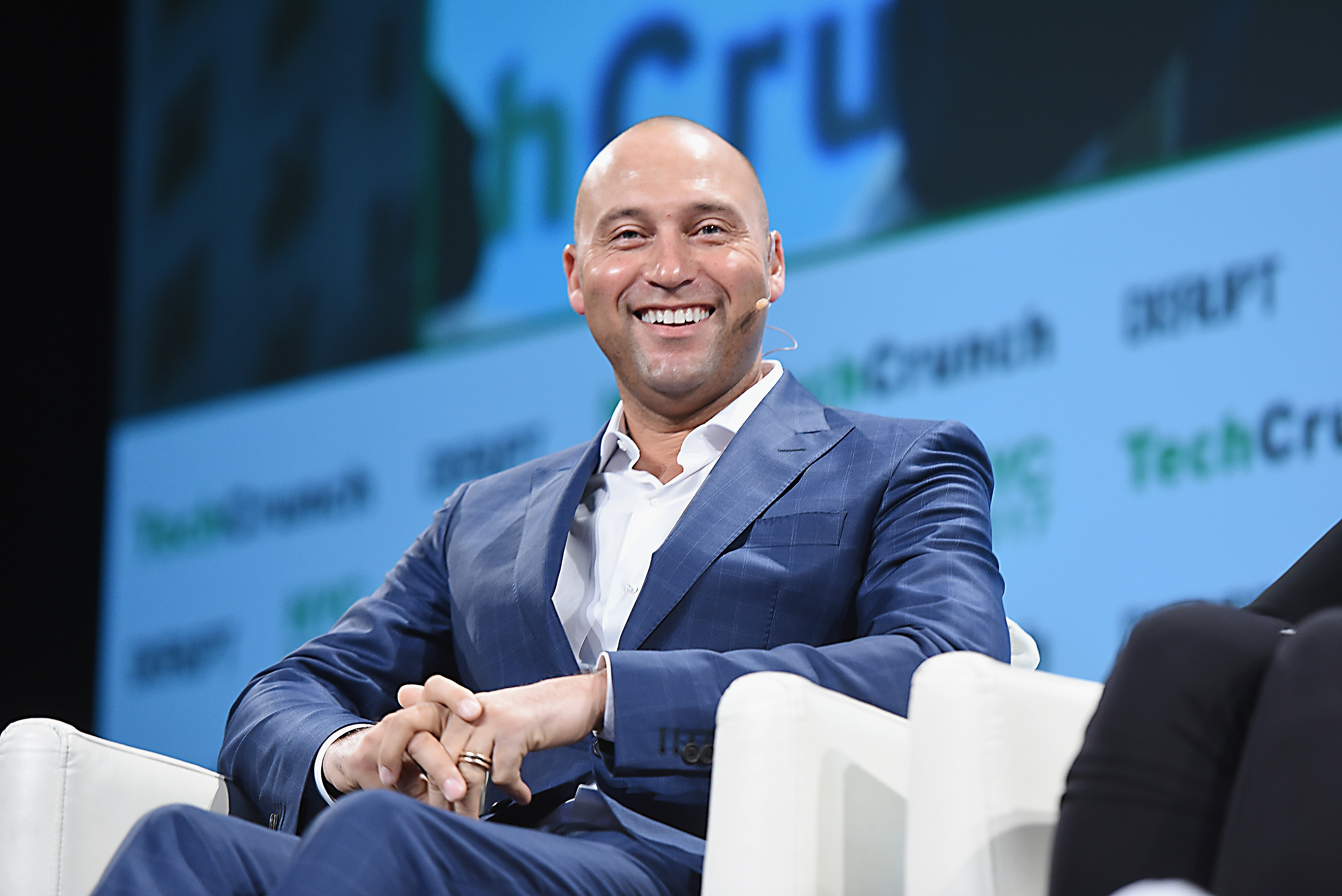

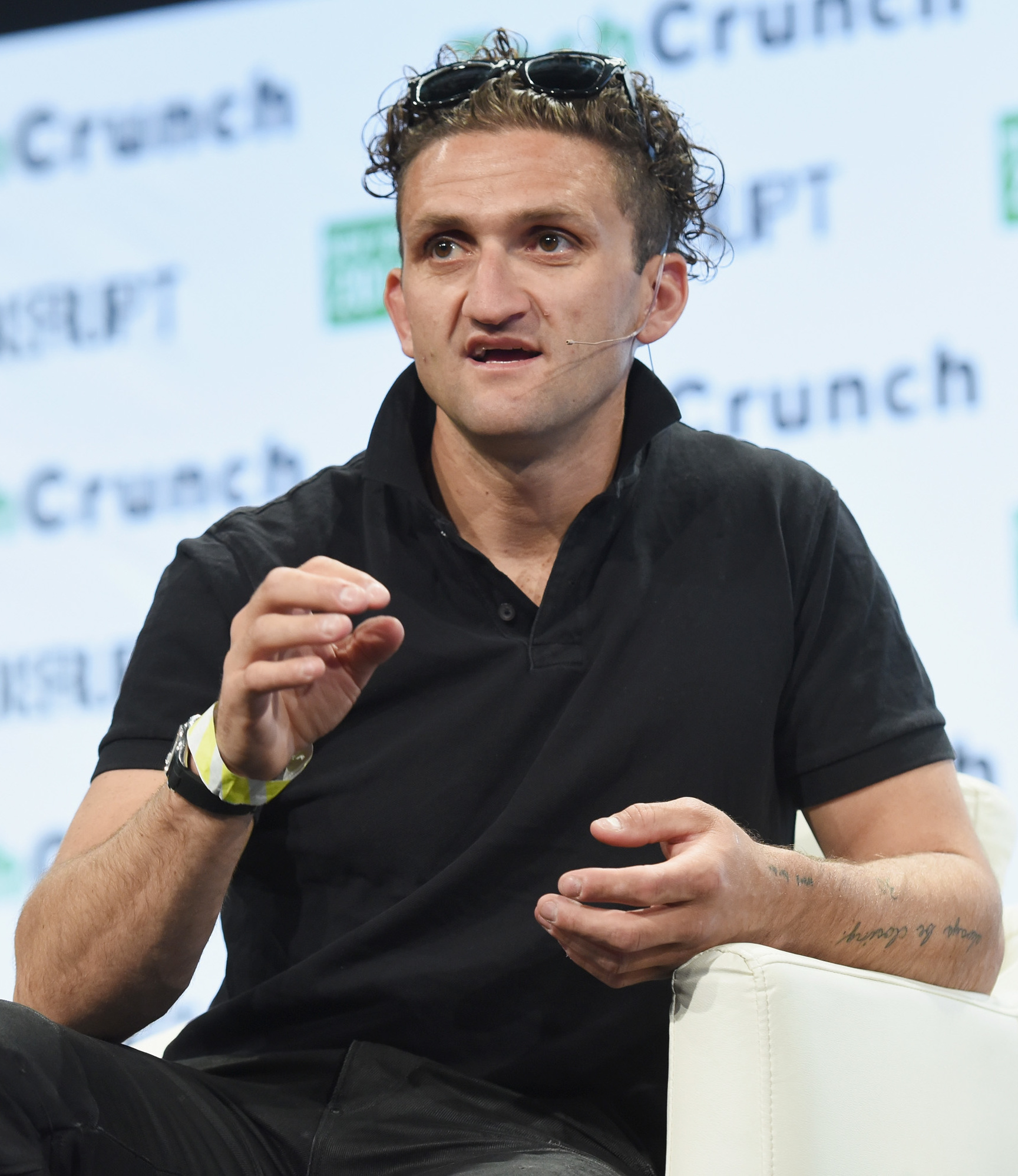
