= Alexandra Muravyeva-Galay =

- Александра Муравьёва-Галай
- Born: Naberezhnye Chelny, Russia
- Occupation: Florist
- Notable work: Floral dress with a 30 meters long train (listed in Russian Book of Records)

Alexandra Muravyeva-Galay is a Russian florist.

== Career ==
Alexandra was born in Naberezhnye Chelny in the Republic of Tatarstan, Russia and studied floral design in Kyiv, Ukraine in the early 1990s and in Moscow in the middle 2000s. Later in 2014 she studied in American Wedding Academy and was certified by the organization.

Since early 1990s Alexandra worked as a floral designer. Through the career she decorated Constantine Palace, Mikhailovsky Palace, Tavrichesky Palace, the Vladimir Palace, Nicholas Palace, Yusupov Palace and the Pavilion of Roses in Pavlovsk Park. In 2009 she was employed by Department for Presidential Affairs of the Russian Federation in Northwestern Federal District as floral designer. In 2015 Alexandra was invited to the jury of Golden Veil wedding design award in Saint Petersburg.

In February 2016 Alexandra created a floral dress with a 30 meters long train and presented it on a ball in Saint Petersburg Philharmonia. It was registered and added to Russian Book of Records, a national reference book listing the achievements of Russian people.
