= Eames: The Architect and the Painter =

2011 American documentary

- Directed by: Jason Cohn; Bill Jersey
- Written by: Jason Cohn
- Produced by: Jason Cohn; Bill Jersey
- Narrated by: James Franco
- Production companies: Quest Productions; Bread & Butter Films; American Masters Productions
- Distributed by: First Run Features
- Release date: November 18, 2011
- Running time: 84 minutes
- Country: United States
- Language: English

Eames: The Architect and the Painter is a 2011 documentary film about American designers Charles and Ray Eames and the Eames Office. It was produced and written by Jason Cohn, and co-produced by Bill Jersey.

The film moves between a narrative about the husband and wife team to one about the Eames Office and its accomplishments, starting with chair design, but also moving through architecture, photography and film. Most of the period images are still photographs from the 1950s, 1960s and 1970s, but there are several film clips. Audio clips are interspersed with narration by James Franco.

The film uses extensive interviews to frame the story. Interviews include Richard Saul Wurman, the founder of TED, Irish architect Kevin Roche, designer Bob Blaich, and screenwriter Paul Schrader; Lucia Eames and Eames Demetrios, Charles Eames' daughter and grandson; former Eames office designers: Jeannine Oppewall, Gordon Ashby, Deborah Sussman, and John and Marilyn Neuhart; historians Pat Kirkham, Jed Perl, and Donald Albrecht; and IBM consultant Zeke Seligson.

== Reception ==
The New York Times reviewer A. O. Scott called it "a lively new documentary" and "appropriately busy and abundant: full of objects, information, stories and people, organized with hectic elegance." He praised it for showing, "in marvelous detail, how their work was an extension of themselves and how their distinct personalities melded into a unique and protean force."

Tom Keogh of The Seattle Times wrote that "Much like the creations of its subjects, 'Eames' is itself a dazzling, sensory adventure" and that "the film is an extraordinary and enjoyable history of how two people influenced so much of our thinking and surroundings today."

Los Angeles Times critic Kenneth Turan described the film as "a thorough and vibrant examination of the master Modernists."

== Awards ==
The film won a Peabody Award in 2012.

== Home media ==
The film is available on DVD.
