= Kovalska Industrial-Construction Group =

Industrial and Construction Group Kovalska, LLC
- Trade name: Kovalska
- Native name: Промислово-будівельна група „Ковальська“
- Romanized name: Promyslovo-budivelna hrupa Kovalska
- Industry: construction, property development
- Founded: 1956
- Headquarters: 03150, 100 Velyka Vasylkivska street, Kyiv, Ukraine
- Key people: Oleksandr Pylypenko (president); Sergii Pylypenko (general director)
- Products: concrete, concrete mixes, building solutions, classical reinforced concrete individual constructive reinforced concrete products, wall products from expanded clay concrete, aerated concrete, paving slabs, dry construction mixes, water-dispersion materials (paints, decorative plasters, foams, glues).
- Number of employees: 4600
- Divisions: JSC "Kovalska Reinforced Concrete Plant"; LLC "Concrete Complex"; LLC "Avtobudkomplex-K"; PJSC "Terminal-M"; LLC "Omelyanivskyi Quarry"; Construction complex "Kovalska"; LLC "Kovalska-Zhytloservis"; LLC "Kovalska-Project"; LLC "Energy Product"; LLC "Rozvadiv Building Materials".
- Website: kovalska.com

ICG Kovalska, LLC is a Ukrainian developer and manufacturer of building materials. The company is part of the Svitlana Kovalska Plant of Reinforced Concrete Structures Joint Stock Company, and at that time the Plant of Reinforced Concrete Products № 3 was founded in 1956.

== History ==
The group's enterprises operate in Kyiv, Zhytomyr, Lviv, Kherson and Chernihiv Oblasts of Ukraine.

The total number of employees is over 4600 people.

The group dates back to 1956, from the date of the founding of the State Plant of Reinforced Concrete Products No. 3 in Kyiv, which in 1993 passed the stage of privatization and was renamed into JSC "Kovalska Reinforced Concrete Plant". The company, and later the entire industrial and construction group, was named after Svitlana Kovalska (1938–1993), a scientist who worked at the company for many years and managed it from 1982 to 1993.

Kovalska Industrial-Construction Group products are represented by a number of brands, including "Concrete by Kovalska", pavement tiles "Avenue" and construction mixtures "Siltek".

In 2000, the process of strengthening the raw material base began — the company included LLC "Omelyanivskyi Quarry".

Since 2002, the development direction is represented in the group. Since then, Kovalska has completed 26 housing projects.

In 2002, Kovalska began building housing in Kyiv. The first projects are residential buildings on Bazhan Avenue.

The next step to ensure autonomy and a full cycle of construction works was the accession in 2004 of the largest metropolitan transport company — LLC "Avtobudkomplex-K". Kovalska Logistics was founded on the basis of the motor transport enterprise. In the same year, LLC "Kovalska-Zhytloservis" was established to provide maintenance for the facilities built by Kovalska Industrial-Construction Group.

In 2006, LLC "Kovalska-Project" own project organization was established.

In 2008, Kovalska expanded its line of construction materials production and launched the production of dry construction mixtures under the "Siltek" brand at PJSC "Terminal-M".

In 2013, PJSC "Darnytskyi Plant of Reinforced Concrete Structures" joined the group.

Kovalska logo from 2016 to 2023

In 2019, the group continued its active regional development and acquired an asset in the Kherson region — "Aerated concrete Kakhovka". Subsequently, the group invested in a production complex in the Lviv region — LLC "Rozvadiv Budmaterialy".

In 2020, Kovalska restarted the development direction, strengthened the team and increased the portfolio of projects, as well as entered the office real estate market, becoming an investor in five new UNIT.City campuses, and she began construction of the Nuvo business park in downtown Kyiv.

Kovalska Industrial-Construction Group is an active member of a number of leading business associations. In particular, it is a member of the Confederation of Builders of Ukraine, the European Business Association, the All-Ukrainian Union of Building Materials Manufacturers, etc. In 2021, the General Director of the group Sergii Pylypenko was appointed deputy chairman of the Board of Directors of the Confederation of Builders of Ukraine, and also headed the Committee on Construction Products of KBU.

== Structure ==
=== Extraction of raw materials ===
Kovalska Industrial-Construction Group has two granite quarries in the Zhytomyr Oblast — LLC "Omelyanivskyi Quarry" (operator of the Berezivskyi granite deposit) and PJSC "Transnational Corporation Granit" (operator of the Korosten-Severyanskyi granite deposit). The assets are merged into the "Granite by Kovalska" division.

The total area of deposits is 90,000,000 m^{2} of rock mass. The enterprises produce granite rubble, screenings and small aggregates. The production capacity of the quarries is 2.8–3 million tons of granite products per year.

In 2020, the group acquired the production complex of LLC "Rozvadiv Budmaterialy" with an area of 140 hectares in the village of Rozvadiv, Lviv Oblast. It consists of sand and limestone quarries.

The planned production volumes are up to 700,000 m^{3}/year of sand and 200 m^{3}/year of limestone. At the Kovalska enterprise in the village of Rozvadiv, Lviv Oblast there are sand sifting lines, a line for crushing and sorting related rocks and a limestone processing line.

=== Production of building materials ===
Kovalska Industrial-Construction Group is a leader in the production of concrete and reinforced concrete products in the Ukrainian market.

==== Concrete ====
The annual capacity of production of ready-mixed concrete and mortars by Kovalska is 4,000,000 m^{3} per year. "Concrete by Kovalska" is made on concrete mixing units (BZU), 33 BZU on the basis of 8 enterprises.

At all enterprises of group the unique system of automation of production process is introduced, the modernized equipment and own raw material base is used.

==== Reinforced concrete and structural ====
Kovalska Industrial-Construction Group manufactures serial and prefabricated reinforced concrete structures of individual production for the construction of frame-type structures. Production capacity of serial reinforced concrete is 269,000 m^{3} of products per year. It is manufactured in 16 shops and landfills on the basis of 6 plants.

In particular, Kovalska manufactures a wide range of floor slabs by extrusion on the technological line of formless molding of the company Nordimpianti System S.r.l. (Italy). Production capacity of prefabricated reinforced concrete structures of individual production - 43,800 m^{3} of products per year. Products are manufactured in 4 shops.

Kovalska enterprises:

- JSC "Kovalska Reinforced Concrete Plant";
- LLC "Concrete Complex";
- LLC "Avtobudkomplex-K";
- PJSC "Darnytskyi Plant of Reinforced Concrete Structures";
- PJSC "ZBV-1";
- JSC "Building Industry" (Chernihiv).

==== Paving slabs and design elements ====
Pavement slabs and landscaping elements by Kovalska have been manufactured under the AVENUE brand since 1999.

Production capacity is 164,250 m^{3} per year. Products are manufactured at the plant of LLC "Concrete Complex" on German equipment Hess.

Kovalska annually improves the recipes of materials in its own Innovation and Technology Center and certifies products in accordance with DSTU.

==== Dry construction mixes ====
Dry construction mixtures and paints under the Siltek brand are one of the areas of work of the Kovalska Industrial-Construction Group.

Three production lines of the plant provide a capacity of 150,000 tons of dry and 10,000 tons of paints and plasters per year. In the Ukrainian market, the company is represented by a wide range of dry construction mixtures, paints, decorative plasters and primers - a total of more than 100 types of goods.

The production line with an automated control system is installed, which guarantees accurate dosing of components and subsequent thorough mixing. The company has its own accredited laboratory equipped with modern testing equipment.

Currently, in the village Rozvadiv, Lviv region, is also building a plant for the production of dry construction mixtures of the Siltek brand. After the launch of the enterprise, its production capacity will be 150,000 tons of mixtures per year.

==== Aerated concrete ====
Since 2019, Kovalska Industrial-Construction Group has included LLC "Energy Product", which produces aerated concrete blocks for autoclave hardening under the "Kakhovka Aerated Concrete" trademark.

LLC "Energy Product" is one of the largest porous concrete enterprises in Ukraine in the Southern region. The plant's production capacity is over 500,000 m^{3} of aerated concrete per year.

This is a modern fully automated production, covering an area of over 30,000 m^{2} and equipped with high-tech Durox equipment from Aircrete Europe. Kakhovka Aerated Concrete has a high holding capacity due to the minimum specific weight and low thermal conductivity.

Currently, in the village Rozvadiv, Lviv Oblast, is also building a plant for the production of aerated concrete. The complex will cover an area of 15 hectares. After the implementation of the first stage, the planned capacity of the enterprise will exceed 500 thousand m3 of products per year. Upon completion of the second - production will double and reach 1 million m3 per year. According to preliminary estimates, the investment will reach €45 million.

=== Logistics ===
Kovalska Logistics is based on the basis of the motor transport enterprise "Avtobudkomplex-K". Kovalska Logistics fleet includes more than 200 units of special equipment: concrete mixers, dump trucks, beam trucks, excavators, truck cranes, panel trucks and other vehicles. The company's assets include railway transport, in particular, five locomotives and 480 cars.

=== Construction of residential real estate ===
Kovalska Industrial-Construction Group is building residential real estate in Kyiv.

In 2021, Kovalska entered the top ten most reliable developers in Ukraine according to Dengi.ua. In the same year, the DOCK32 project by Kovalska topped the list of the most investment-attractive new buildings in the Mind ranking.

Since the development of the residential segment, Kovalska has built more than 769,000 m^{2} of housing in 26 projects.

=== Operating organization ===
In 2004, Kovalska Industrial-Construction Group founded the operating organization LLC "Kovalska-Zhytloservis", which takes care of buildings and provides after-sales service. "Kovalska-Zhytloservis" performs a set of works that ensures the functioning of the engineering infrastructure of various facilities - residential buildings and adjacent plots, office centers, parking lots, etc.

=== Construction of office real estate ===
In 2020, the group entered the office real estate market as a professional player. In the fall of 2020, Kovalska Industrial-Construction Group and the holding company UFuture announced cooperation and began construction of new business campuses on the territory of UNIT.City.

Kovalska's team undertook the construction of five business campuses with a total area of 70,000 m^{2}. Investments in the development of the innovation park by the Kovalska industrial and construction group exceed $70 million.

For the development of campuses B06 and B04, which were included in the first phase of construction, Kovalska hired the European architectural firm APA Wojciechowski. The facilities are planned to be Leed Silver certified, which means that they will consume 25% less energy and water during operation. The whole cycle of works - from design to operation — is accompanied by BIM-coordination.

In the winter of 2020, Kovalska Industrial-Construction Group announced the construction of the first business park in the center of Kyiv — Nuvo Business Park.

Nuvo Business Park is a complex of seven technological buildings, which will include class A office centers, apartments and a complex of trade and service services.

The total commercial area of the business park exceeds 88,000 m^{2}. The expected cost of the project is over $90 million.

The project is implemented together with the development company KDD Ukraine. The expected implementation period of the entire project is five years.

=== Development of design solutions ===
Since 2006, "Kovalska-Project" division has been developing design solutions in the construction industry. The company designs industrial, logistics, trade and entertainment and other types of buildings erected using reinforced concrete elements of prefabricated frame structures. The company also provides engineering support and technical supervision of construction, modernization of the group's enterprises, introduction of new technologies and design of production lines.

== Management ==
Kovalska Industrial-Construction Group is a family company. The founder, main shareholder and president of the group is Oleksandr Pylypenko.

Sergii Pylypenko is the general director and one of the co-owners. Mykola Subotenko and Volodymyr Surup are also co-founders and shareholders.

== Financial statements ==
According to the financial statements of Kovalska Industrial-Construction Group, in 2019 the group's revenue amounted to ₴5.4 billion. The companies transferred ₴378 million to the budgets of all levels. ₴146 million in taxes and fees were paid from employees' salaries.

In 2019, Kovalska invested ₴853 million in its own development.

== Research activities ==
In addition to production facilities, the group has a Kovalska Innovation and Technology Center, which develops and improves concrete formulations, studies the properties of building materials, as well as fully tests the raw materials and products of Kovalska Industrial-Construction Group.

In 2018, Kovalska Industrial-Construction Group joined the environmental protection project after the consequences of the Chornobyl Exclusion Zone. Especially for the construction of a spent nuclear fuel storage facility, the "Kovalska Innovation and Technology Center" has developed a unique concrete that has the property of not hardening for 5 hours.

In 2020–2021, Kovalska joined the modernization project of the Vernadsky Research Base in Antarctica. Specialists of the "Kovalska Innovation and Technology Center" have developed a special concrete recipe for foundation works.

== Controversies ==
=== Collapse of a section of the Dehtiarivskyi Overpass in Kyiv ===
On 30 September 2023, several spans of the Dehtiarivskyi overpass on Oleksandra Dovzhenka Street in Kyiv collapsed during repair works. There were no casualties or injuries as a result of the incident. Pavlo Avdokushyn, a member of the National Union of Journalists of Ukraine and an independent infrastructure analyst, stated in a comment to Suspilne that the causes of the beam collapse during installation should be determined by experts. According to him, such beams were being used for the second time in Ukraine (the first case was in Borodianka), but in this instance they were produced by a different manufacturer – the Kovalska plant.

=== Tree felling in a protected landscape area ===
In September 2025, activists documented the operation of heavy machinery within the “Horbachykha” landscape reserve in Kyiv’s Dniprovskyi District. On 23 September, according to veteran and civic activist Oleh Symoroz, an excavator was brought to the site and began covering soil together with trees. Local residents also reported the felling of green spaces. According to them, the machinery belonged to the construction site of the “Rusanivska Havan” residential complex, which is being developed by the Kovalska Group. Activists claimed that the developer had no permits for carrying out such works. As a result, investigators of the National Police of Ukraine opened criminal proceedings.

In turn, representatives of Kovalska stated in a comment to Khmarochos that they were carrying out landscaping works, including clearing an overgrown area, adding soil, and planning a pedestrian zone with access for fire service vehicles.

=== Fine for discriminatory advertising ===
In 2025, the company launched an advertising campaign titled “Hard Standard” featuring pornographic actress Josephine Jackson (Yuliia Seniuk). In the commercial, a man lying on a sofa complains to Josephine Jackson, who is sitting next to him, that “it doesn’t get hard.” It is later revealed that the reference is to concrete, and the actress provides advice on its use. The advertisement states: “She will feel when firmness is lacking. And she will definitely say what to do about it. Josephine is an expert in firmness who will explain everything: with tenderness, confidence, and firm conviction. Because even the highest-quality concrete requires the right approach. A hard standard is when strength gives a sense of calm.”

The campaign sparked public outrage, accusations of sexism, and complaints to the State Service of Ukraine on Food Safety and Consumer Protection. Following expert assessments, the authority concluded that the Kovalska advertisement was discriminatory and violated the Law of Ukraine “On Advertising,” as it used eroticized imagery unrelated to the product. As a result of the inspection, the State Service imposed a fine and ordered the suspension of the distribution of the content.

=== Sand extraction controversies in Kyiv ===
A company affiliated with the Kovalska Group has faced efforts to revoke its right to extract sand in Kyiv following complaints from residents about soil subsidence and fish deaths. In 2024, the Deputy Prosecutor General filed a lawsuit with the Kyiv District Administrative Court seeking to declare unlawful a number of actions and decisions by the State Service of Geology and Subsoil of Ukraine and the State Commission of Ukraine on Mineral Resources, and to annul Special Permit No. 6346 issued to Sand Contract LLC, a member of the Kovalska Group, for sand extraction at the Osokory deposit in Kyiv.

Under a similar procedure, in 2019, Butsaid LLC, also part of the Kovalska Group, obtained rights to use the eastern section of the Novo-Ukrainske sand deposit under a permit that has also been challenged.

=== Demolition of a historic building and lawsuit against activist Dmytro Perov ===
In the summer of 2023, Kovalska demolished a one-story historic building at 47 Zhylianska Street in Kyiv to construct an office center. Activist Dmytro Perov wrote about the demolition on social media, after which Kovalska filed two lawsuits against him. The first claim was withdrawn, while the second was filed to protect the company’s honor, dignity, and business reputation. The claims included demands for a retraction of allegedly false information and compensation for moral damages amounting to UAH 100,000. In the summer of 2023, Kovalska demolished a one-story historic building at 47 Zhylianska Street in Kyiv to construct an office center. Activist Dmytro Perov wrote about the demolition on social media, after which Kovalska filed two lawsuits against him. The first claim was withdrawn, while the second was filed to protect the company’s honor, dignity, and business reputation. The claims included demands for a retraction of allegedly false information and compensation for moral damages amounting to UAH 100,000.

On 11 November 2024, lawyers representing Kovalska Real Estate LLC added new claims in court, asserting that several social media posts had caused the company losses of UAH 85 million. At the same time, Dmytro Perov stated that the company had unlawfully destroyed a historic monument more than 160 years old, while the developer considered these statements defamatory. According to Perov, the case was indicative of an attempt to demonstrate the company’s power over civil society.

In March, the Shevchenkivskyi District Court of Kyiv fully dismissed the claims of Kovalska Real Estate LLC. A similar decision was upheld by the Kyiv Court of Appeal in November 2025.

In December 2025, the Kyiv Court of Appeal ordered Kovalska Real Estate LLC to pay UAH 76,275 to activist Dmytro Perov. The court dismissed the company’s claims for moral damages and upheld the right to describe the demolished building at 47 Zhylianska Street in Kyiv as a historic structure.
