= Iryna Halay =

Ukrainian mountaineer

Iryna Oleksandrivna Halay (Ukrainian: Ірина Олександрівна Галай; born 1988) is a Ukrainian mountaineer from Mukacheve, Zakarpattia Oblast. On 20 May 2016, she became the first Ukrainian woman to climb Mount Everest and to raise the Ukrainian flag on its peak. On July 27, 2021, she became the first Ukrainian woman to climb K2, reaching nearly 8,000 meters without an oxygen mask. In 2024, she summited Annapurna, another eight-thousander. In 2022, after Russia expanded its scope of its prolonged invasion and occupation of Ukraine, she enlisted in the Ukrainian Armed Forces.
