= Isaac in America: A Journey with Isaac Bashevis Singer =

- Directed by: Amram Nowak
- Produced by: Kirk Simon; Amram Nowak
- Narrated by: Judd Hirsch
- Cinematography: Jerry Pantzer; Greg Andrake; Kirk Simon
- Edited by: Riva Freifeld
- Distributed by: Direct Cinema; PBS (television)
- Release date: September 28, 1986
- Running time: 58 minutes
- Country: United States
- Language: English

Isaac in America: A Journey With Isaac Bashevis Singer is a 1986 documentary made by director Amram Nowak and producer Kirk Simon. It was broadcast on the PBS series American Masters.

== Summary ==
The documentary Isaac in America: A Journey With Isaac Bashevis Singer is a characterization of the writer Isaac Bashevis Singer. It was filmed only a few years before he died, and depicts the author looking back on his professional and life experiences. Singer is best known for his Yiddish stories, which have a universal appeal. He went on to win a Nobel Prize in Literature.

From the documentary the viewer is able to see that Singer's personality matches his unconventional and unique written works. His office is filled with diplomas and awards, but Singer is well aware that the events of his life could have turned out in a very different manner. Born in 1902 in a small, Yiddish-speaking town not far from Warsaw, he escaped Nazi occupation by fleeing to the United States of America and settling in New York City. There is a possibility that he could have starved if the Yiddish newspaper The Jewish Daily The Forward had not acknowledged the promising writer's talent and printed his stories frequently. Isaac in America focuses on the Nobel Prize winner during the final years of his existence.

Singer spent the majority of his life in America, yet he and his work were strongly affected by his birthplace. Despite venturing off to different locations, his work and experiences were measured against the backdrop of his hometown. The people Singer associated with and desired to write about were entirely Old World Yiddish speakers, people filled with fear and inquisitiveness about the supernatural. As Singer discusses in the film, he could not have written about Texan cowboys because he had no knowledge how they operated or their vernacular. Saul Bellow and many other contemporary Jewish writers saw themselves as American writers who happened to be Jewish, conversely Singer viewed himself as a Jewish writer — one whose roots were demolished by the Holocaust, but could live on forever through his writings. Isaac in America provides the observer an additional layer of admiration to Singer's writing by exploring its memoir-like themes and displaying the writer's personal understanding of his pieces. The story “A Day at Coney Island,” for example, was crafted upon Singer's first summer in America.

Singer reads excerpts from the above-mentioned short story and goes into details about it, he even shares self-effacing anecdotes and very intimate memories. The author goes so far as to revisit the characters and places that appeared in the work many years ago; Singer is both surprised and saddened by how they have been changed by time. The viewer is offered a rare glimpse of Singer in his apartment on the Upper West Side of Manhattan; his office is so full of books and documents that there is barely any space to move about. However, Singer is not bothered by the disarray. “Chaos is not really ugly,” he explains, “The chaos was before the world was created. Before God said, 'Let there be light,' there was chaos.” And because of this logic, he sees no reasoning in tidying up the clutter.

The documentary takes a strict approach when Singer discusses his writing, making him a valuable asset for up-and-coming writers. The author is also filmed in a classroom, where he lectures to pupils on the value of having a beginning, middle and end to a story and of maintaining a clear plot and comprehensible language, because “there's no great art in confusing the reader.” As Singer goes on to talk about his profession, the more he reveals about himself. He asserts that all good stories are love stories because it is in love that a person becomes exposed and shows their true self. “No where is the human being, character, personality expressed so clearly as in love,” he says. With that he appears to reveal what becomes apparent from studying him: the writer's fondness for words are equaled only by his adoration for women.

The film premiered at the New York Film Festival in 1986. It also played festivals at Sundance Film Festival, in Berlin, and at the Visions du Réel documentary film festival, Nyon, Switzerland - where it won Best Film. The film was also nominated for an Academy Award as Best Documentary Feature. It was later broadcast on the PBS series American Masters.
