= American Masters =

American biography television series

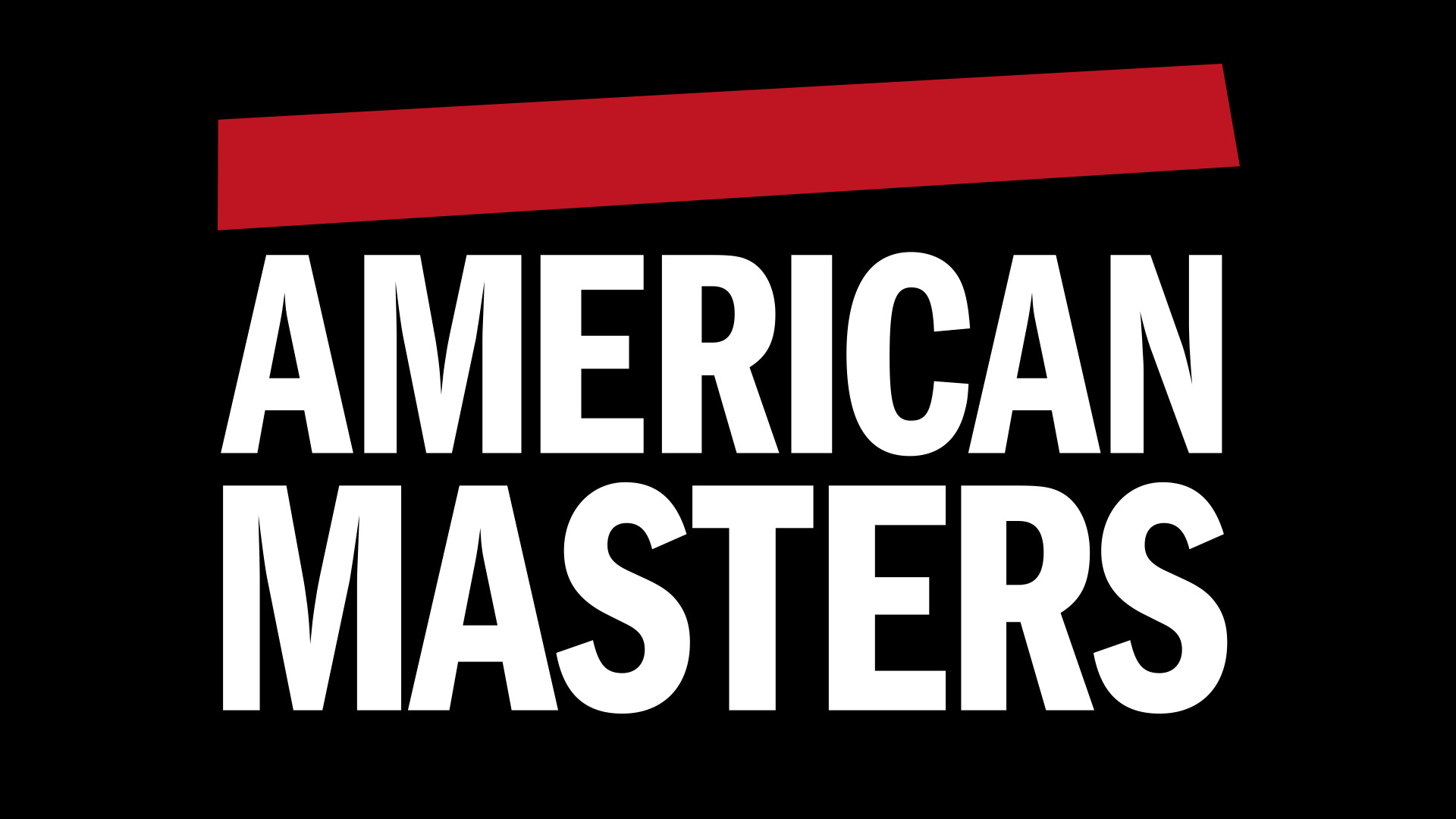
- Created by: Susan Lacy
- Theme music composer: Jonathan Tunick (1986–1995)
- Country of origin: United States
- Original language: English
- No. of seasons: 38
- No. of episodes: 288 (list of episodes)

Production
- Executive producers: Susan Lacy (1986–2013), Michael Kantor (2014–present)
- Producer: WNET

Original release
- Network: PBS
- Release: June 23, 1986 – present

Previous logo

American Masters is a PBS television series which produces biographies on enduring writers, musicians, visual and performing artists, dramatists, filmmakers, and those who have left an indelible impression on the cultural landscape of the United States. It is produced by WNET in New York City. The show debuted on PBS in 1986.

Groups or organizations featured include: Actors Studio, Algonquin Round Table, Group Theatre, Sweet Honey in the Rock, Women of Tin Pan Alley, Negro Ensemble Company, Juilliard School, the Beat Generation, the singer-songwriters of the 1970s, Sun Records, vaudeville, and Warner Bros.

== History ==
American Masters, a series "devoted to America's 'greatest native-born and adopted' artists", was originally scheduled to premiere in September 1985; for "logistical scheduling reasons" the premiere was delayed until summer 1986, though on October 16, 1985, an American Masters "special" called Aaron Copland: A Self-Portrait was aired.

The first of the 15 first-season episodes was Private Conversations, a "cinema-verite documentary by Christian Blackwood done in that trickiest of cinematic forms: a film about a film, in this instance the television version of Death of a Salesman, directed by Volker Schlöndorff". It aired on June 23, 1986, as one of two episodes not specifically commissioned for the show's first season.

Susan Lacy, American Masters creator and former executive producer, selected each subject, matched them to the specific filmmakers, and oversaw a first-season budget of $8 million. Before creating the series Lacy had been the senior programmer for Great Performances and one of the "architects" of American Playhouse, having written the original proposal for the latter. At the time of the show's premiere, she was also the East Coast head of the Sundance Institute.

In 2014, Michael Kantor succeeded Lacy as executive producer. As an independent producer, Kantor had directed one American Masters episode (Quincy Jones: In the Pocket, season 16, episode 4) and produced and directed the Emmy Award-winning series, Broadway: The American Musical and Make 'Em Laugh: The Funny Business of America with WNET. As head of the American Masters series, Kantor created the American Masters podcast in 2016 and the theatrical imprint, American Masters Pictures, in 2016, which brought ten films to the Sundance Film Festival over a period of five years.

After the show's first two seasons, American Masters began producing most of its episodes; in those cases, it hires directors, arranges for funding, manages the budget, and supervises the editing; the show reserves the right to make the final cut on every film it produces. The American Masters production company occasionally plays a more limited role and co-produces some of its episodes, such as the 2005 documentary on Bob Dylan, No Direction Home, and then in 2010 The Doors, When You're Strange.

== Episodes ==
Season	Episodes	Originally released	
Season	Episodes	First released	Last released
1	12	June 23, 1986	September 8, 1986
2	10	July 6, 1987	November 25, 1987
3	7	July 11, 1988	June 26, 1989
4	10	July 3, 1989	November 15, 1989
5	9	December 20, 1989	September 17, 1990
6	10	July 1, 1991	May 1, 1992
7	3	March 14, 1993	March 24, 1993
8	2	December 8, 1993	May 13, 1994
9	4	November 30, 1994	March 22, 1995
10	5	November 29, 1995	May 22, 1996
11	5	November 25, 1996	June 25, 1997
12	6	September 17, 1997	June 17, 1998
13	7	October 28, 1998	August 18, 1999
14	7	November 1, 1999	May 31, 2000
15	8	September 27, 2000	April 23, 2001
16	8	October 7, 2001	March 3, 2002
17	8	October 2, 2002	July 30, 2003
18	8	September 3, 2003	August 18, 2004
19	7	May 11, 2005	September 27, 2005
20	8	May 10, 2006	January 3, 2007
21	9	April 4, 2007	November 5, 2007
22	7	February 27, 2008	September 25, 2008
23	8	February 18, 2009	December 28, 2009
24	8	January 11, 2010	December 27, 2010
25	8	January 12, 2011	December 19, 2011
26	8	January 23, 2012	December 28, 2012
27	5	February 22, 2012	November 5, 2013
28	10	December 27, 2013	December 2, 2014
29	9	January 23, 2015	September 25, 2015
30	9	January 29, 2016	December 27, 2016
31	9	January 3, 2017	December 29, 2017
32	9	January 19, 2018	October 14, 2018
33	12	January 2, 2019	November 18, 2019
34	7	February 25, 2020	December 4, 2020
35	12	January 18, 2021	October 19, 2021
36	8	January 11, 2022	December 27, 2022
37	10	January 24, 2023	October 7, 2023
38	6	January 2, 2024	December 16, 2024
39	8	February 21, 2025	October 14, 2025
40	8	January 27, 2026	December 29, 2026

== Reception ==
Jevon Phillips of Los Angeles Times called the episode "Amy Tan: Unintended Memoir", "Fantastic."
