= Ronald Reagan filmography =

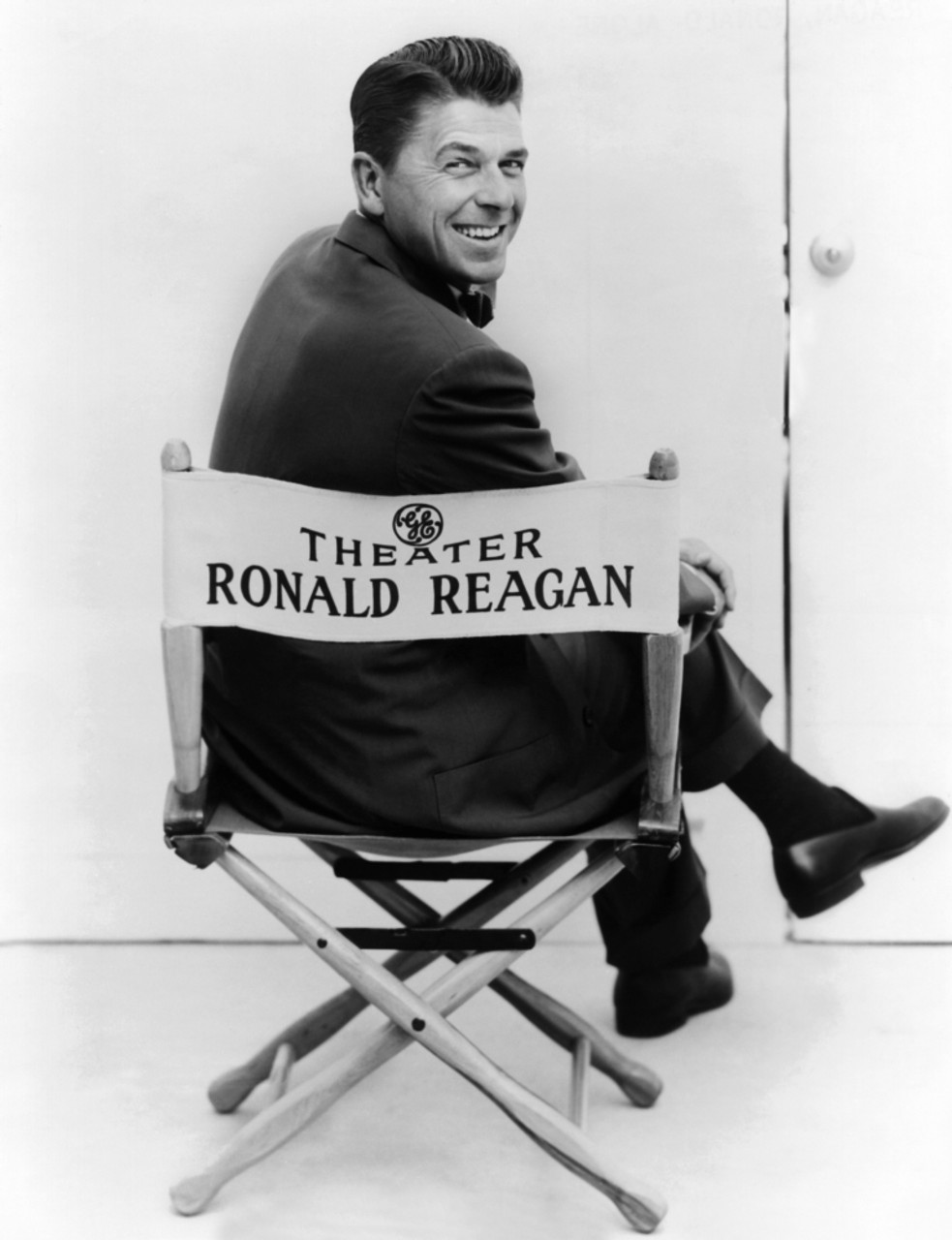
Publicity photograph of Reagan as host of General Electric Theater, 1950s

Ronald Reagan was an American politician and actor. His first screen credit was the starring role in the film Love Is on the Air (1937). He later starred in Brother Rat (1938). By the end of 1939, he had already appeared in 19 films. Reagan later played the role of George Gipp in the film Knute Rockne, All American (1940) before appearing in Santa Fe Trail (1940). Reagan portrayed Drake McHugh in Kings Row (1942), which many film critics consider to be his best film performance. During World War II, Reagan worked in the Provisional Task Force Show Unit of This Is the Army (1943). By the end of the war, he had produced some 400 training films for the Army Air Force.

Reagan continued his acting career, making films such as The Voice of the Turtle (1947), Bedtime for Bonzo (1951), The Winning Team (1952) and Cattle Queen of Montana (1954). However, he landed fewer film roles in the late 1950s and decided to join television. From 1954 to 1962, he was the host of General Electric Theater, a series of weekly dramas. By the end of his acting career, Reagan appeared in a total of 53 feature films.

== Film ==
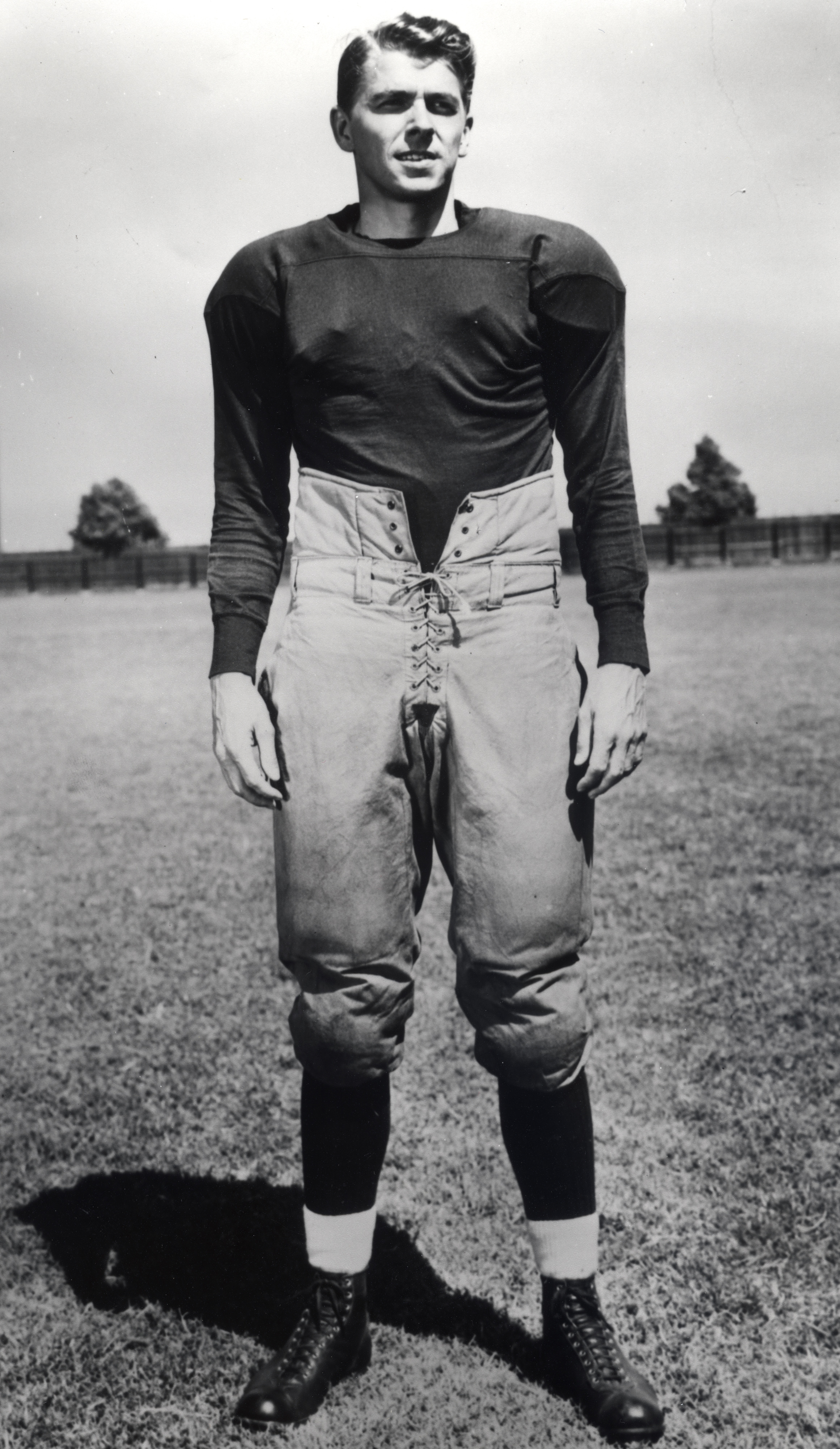
Still of Reagan from Knute Rockne, All American, 1940

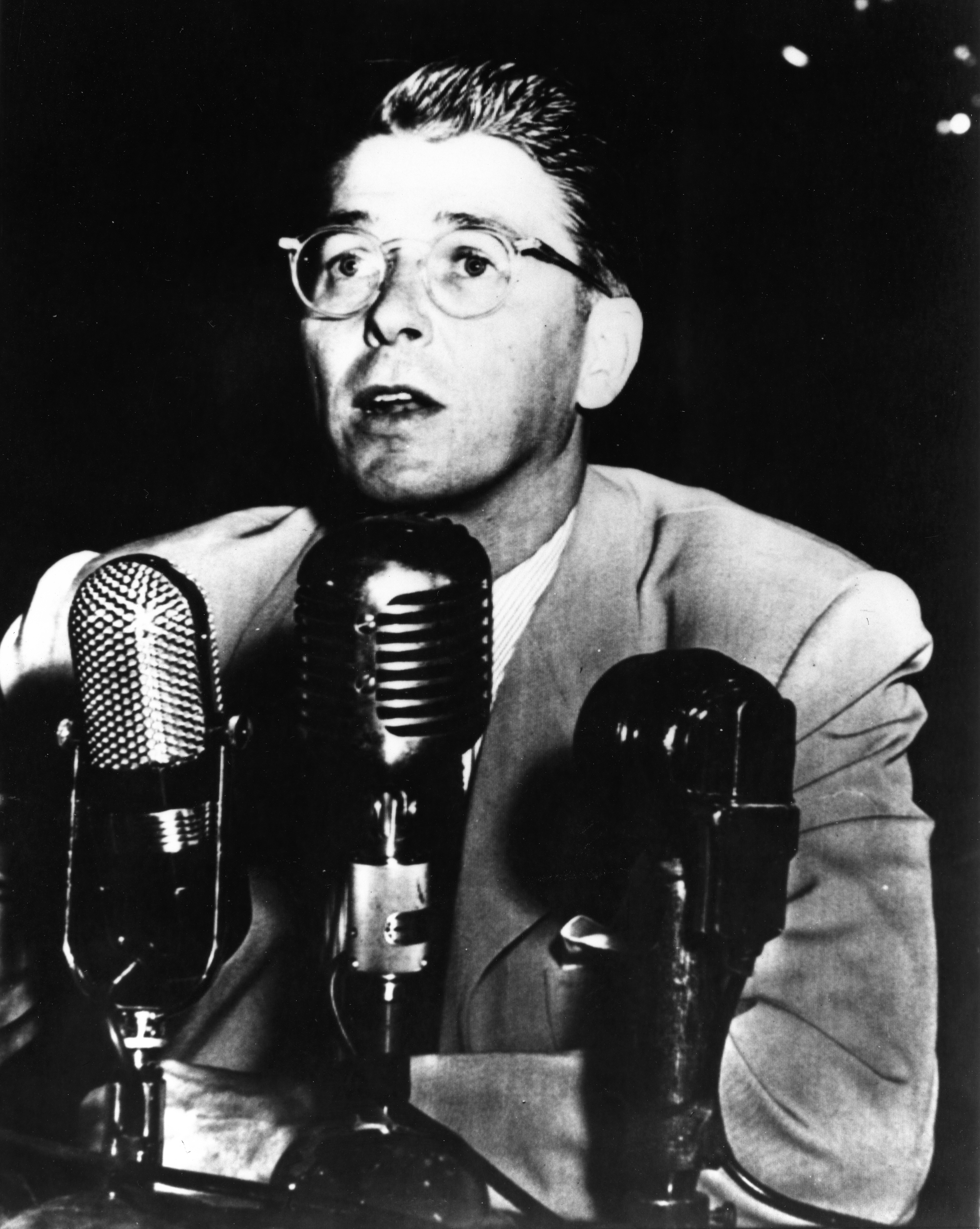
Reagan, then-president of the Screen Actors Guild, testifying at a House Un-American Activities Committee hearing, 1947

Film credits
| Year | Title | Role | Notes | Refs. |
|---|---|---|---|---|
| 1937 | Love Is on the Air | Andy McCaine | | |
| 1938 | Hollywood Hotel | Radio Announcer | Voice role; uncredited | |
| 1938 | Sergeant Murphy | Pvt. Dennis Reilley | | |
| 1938 | Swing Your Lady | Jack Miller | | |
| 1938 | Accidents Will Happen | Eric Gregg | | |
| 1938 | Cowboy from Brooklyn | Pat Dunn | | |
| 1938 | The Amazing Dr. Clitterhouse | Radio Announcer | Voice role; uncredited | |
| 1938 | Boy Meets Girl | Announcer | | |
| 1938 | Girls on Probation | Neil Dillon | | |
| 1938 | Brother Rat | Dan Crawford | | |
| 1938 | Going Places | Jack Withering | | |
| 1939 | Secret Service of the Air | Lt. "Brass" Bancroft | | |
| 1939 | Dark Victory | Alec Hamm | | |
| 1939 | Code of the Secret Service | Lt. "Brass" Bancroft | | |
| 1939 | Naughty but Nice | Ed "Eddie" Clark | | |
| 1939 | Hell's Kitchen | Jim Donohue | | |
| 1939 | The Angels Wash Their Faces | Deputy District Attorney Patrick "Pat" Remson | | |
| 1939 | Smashing the Money Ring | Lt. "Brass" Bancroft | | |
| 1939 | Sword Fishing | Narrator | Short film | |
| 1940 | Brother Rat and a Baby | Dan Crawford | | |
| 1940 | An Angel from Texas | Marty Allen | | |
| 1940 | Murder in the Air | Lt. "Brass" Bancroft | | |
| 1940 | Knute Rockne, All American | George "The Gipper" Gipp | | |
| 1940 | Tugboat Annie Sails Again | Eddie Kent | | |
| 1940 | Alice in Movieland | "Carlo's Guest" | Short film; uncredited | |
| 1940 | Santa Fe Trail | George Armstrong Custer | | |
| 1941 | The Bad Man | Gilbert "Gil" Jones | | |
| 1941 | Million Dollar Baby | Peter "Pete" Rowan | | |
| 1941 | International Squadron | Jimmy Grant | | |
| 1941 | Nine Lives Are Not Enough | Matt Sawyer | | |
| 1942 | Recognition of the Japanese Zero Fighter | Lt. Jimmy Saunders | Documentary short | |
| 1942 | Kings Row | Drake McHugh | | |
| 1942 | Juke Girl | Steve Talbot | | |
| 1942 | Mister Gardenia Jones | Gardenia Jones | Short film | |
| 1942 | Desperate Journey | Johnny Hammond | | |
| 1942 | Beyond the Line of Duty | Narrator | Short film | |
| 1943 | Cadet Classification | Narrator | Short film | |
| 1943 | The Rear Gunner | Lt. Ames | Short film | |
| 1943 | For God and Country | Fr. Michael O'Keefe | Short film | |
| 1943 | This Is the Army | Cpl. Johnny Jones | | |
| 1944–1945 | Hesitation Upwind | Narrator | Short film | |
| 1945 | Target Tokyo | Narrator | | |
| 1945 | The Fight for the Sky | Narrator | Short film | |
| 1945 | The Stilwell Road | Narrator | | |
| 1945 | Wings for This Man | Narrator | | |
| 1947 | Stallion Road | Larry Hanrahan | | |
| 1947 | That Hagen Girl | Tom Bates | | |
| 1947 | The Voice of the Turtle | Sgt. Bill Page | | |
| 1949 | John Loves Mary | John Lawrence | | |
| 1949 | Night Unto Night | John Galen | | |
| 1949 | The Girl from Jones Beach | Bob Randolph | | |
| 1949 | The Hasty Heart | Yank | | |
| 1949 | It's a Great Feeling | — | Cameo | |
| 1950 | Louisa | Harold "Hal" Norton | | |
| 1951 | The Big Truth | Narrator/Host | Short film | |
| 1951 | Storm Warning | Burt Rainey | | |
| 1951 | The Last Outpost | Cpt. Vance Britten | | |
| 1951 | Bedtime for Bonzo | Prof. Peter Boyd | | |
| 1952 | Hong Kong | Jeff Williams | | |
| 1952 | The Winning Team | Grover Cleveland Alexander | | |
| 1952 | She's Working Her Way Through College | Prof. John Palmer | | |
| 1953 | Tropic Zone | Dan McCloud | | |
| 1953 | Law and Order | Frame Johnson | | |
| 1954 | Prisoner of War | Webb Sloane | | |
| 1954 | Cattle Queen of Montana | Farrell | | |
| 1955 | Tennessee's Partner | Cowpoke | | |
| 1957 | Hellcats of the Navy | Cdr. Casey Abbott | | |
| 1961 | The Young Doctors | Narrator | | |
| 1963 | Heritage of Splendor | Narrator | Documentary | |
| 1964 | The Killers | Jack Browning | | |

== Television ==
Television credits
| Year | Title | Role | Notes | Refs. |
|---|---|---|---|---|
| 1950 | The Nash Airflyte Theater | Tommy Blunt | Episode: "The Case of the Missing Lady" | |
| 1952 | Hollywood Opening Night | | Episode: "The Priceless Gift" | |
| 1953 | Medallion Theatre | | Episode: "A Job for Jimmy Valentine" | |
| 1953 | The Revlon Mirror Theater | | Episode: "Next Stop: Bethlehem" | |
| 1953–1954 | Lux Video Theatre | Merle Fisher | 2 episodes | |
| 1953–1954 | Schlitz Playhouse of Stars | | 3 episodes | |
| 1953–1954 | The Ford Television Theatre | Various | 3 episodes | |
| 1954–1962 | General Electric Theater | Host / Various | Hosted 235 teleplays; acted in 35 episodes | |
| 1955 | Walt Disney's Disneyland | Co-host | Episode: "Dateline: Disneyland" | |
| 1956 | G.E. Summer Originals | | Episode: "The Jungle Trap" | |
| 1960 | The DuPont Show with June Allyson | Alan Royce | Episode: "The Way Home" | |
| 1960 | Startime | Host | 2 episodes | |
| 1961 | Zane Grey Theatre | Maj. Will Sinclair | Episode: "The Long Shadow" | |
| 1961–1963 | The Dick Powell Show | Guest Host / Rex Kent | 2 episodes | |
| 1963 | Wagon Train | Cpt. Paul Winters | Episode: "The Fort Pierce Story" | |
| 1964 | Kraft Suspense Theatre | Judge Howard R. Stimming | Episode: "A Cruel and Unusual Night" | |
| 1964–1966 | Death Valley Days | Host / Actor | Acted in 8 episodes | |

== Works cited ==
- Eliot, Marc (2008). Reagan: The Hollywood Years. Harmony Books. ISBN 978-0-307-40513-5.
- Thomas, Tony (1980). The Films of Ronald Reagan. Citadel Press. ISBN 978-0-8065-0751-4.
- Vaughn, Stephen (1994). Ronald Reagan in Hollywood: Movies and Politics. Cambridge University Press. ISBN 978-0-521-44080-6.
