= First Motion Picture Unit =

Film production unit of the US Army Air Forces

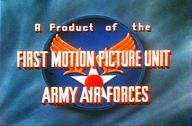
- Credit screen
- Active: 1942–1945
- Country: United States
- Branch: U.S. Army Air Forces
- Type: Motion Picture
- Role: Propaganda and training
- Size: 1,110 officers and airmen
- Headquarters: Hal Roach Studios, Culver City, California
- Nickname: "Celluloid Commandos" or "Hollywood Commandos"
- Motto: We kill 'em with fil’m
- Engagements: World War II; American Theater

Commanders
- Notable commanders: Jack L. Warner; Owen Crump; Paul Mantz

Insignia
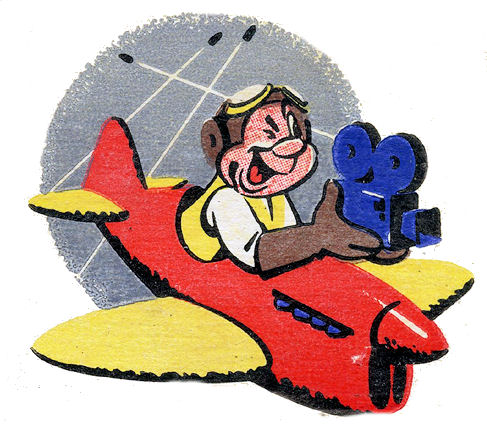
- 18th AAF Base Unit emblem

The 18th AAF Base Unit (Motion Picture Unit), originally known as the First Motion Picture Unit, Army Air Forces, was the primary film production unit of the U.S. Army Air Forces (AAF) during World War II, and was the first military unit made up entirely of professionals from the film industry. It produced more than 400 propaganda and training films, which were notable for being informative as well as entertaining. Films for which the unit is known include Resisting Enemy Interrogation, Memphis Belle: A Story of a Flying Fortress and The Last Bomb—all of which were released in theatres. Veteran actors such as Clark Gable, William Holden, Clayton Moore, Ronald Reagan, Stan Lee, Craig Stevens and DeForest Kelley, and directors such as John Sturges served with the 18th AAF Base Unit. The unit also produced training films and trained combat cameramen.

First Motion Picture Unit is also the eponymous title of a 1943 self-produced documentary about the unit narrated by radio and television announcer Ken Carpenter.

== Background ==
When the United States entered World War II in December 1941, the Air Corps was a part of the Army, and motion picture production was the responsibility of the Army Signal Corps. USAAF Commanding General "Hap" Arnold believed that the formation of an independent film entity would help lead to the air service gaining its independence. At a meeting in March 1942, General Arnold commissioned Warner Bros. head Jack L. Warner, producer Hal Wallis and scriptwriter Owen Crump to create the unit. Warner was made lieutenant colonel and Crump a captain but Wallis, who was then in production with Casablanca, did not accept the offer. Of immediate concern was a critical shortage of pilots and recruits. Arnold told Warner he needed 100,000 pilots, and contracted with Warner Bros. to produce and release a recruitment film, which would come to be known as Winning Your Wings.

Winning Your Wings was directed by John Huston and Owen Crump, and featured James Stewart as a dashing pilot. Stewart's virile, masculine portrayal changed the public perception of military aviators. The film, which was completed in only two weeks, was a great success and according to General Arnold was pivotal in recruiting 100,000 pilots. Warner Bros. would produce several films prior to the activation of the First Motion Picture Unit, most notably Men of the Sky, Beyond the Line of Duty and The Rear Gunner.

== Formation ==
The success of Winning Your Wings created a demand for training and recruitment films which proved difficult for Warner Bros. to fulfill. Jack Warner began the process of developing the organizational structure for an independent motion picture unit. The dual mission of the unit was to produce training and morale films, and to train combat cameramen. The ranks were to be filled with film industry professionals, the first time in history such a unit would be raised.

The Hal Roach Studios; leased by Headquarters, 18th AAF Base Unit

On 1 July 1942, the First Motion Picture Unit became an active unit of the USAAF. Key personnel that formed the initial roster included Lt. Col. Warner as commanding officer, Capt. Crump, Capt. Knox Manning, 2nd Lt. Edwin Gilbert, 2nd Lt. Ronald Reagan and Cpl. Oren W. Haglund. At first the unit operated out of offices at Warner Bros. in Burbank, California, and then moved to Vitagraph Studios in Hollywood. Vitagraph, however, had not been maintained and proved to be inadequate for movie production on a scale required by the unit. By sheer happenstance Crump came upon the Hal Roach Studios in Culver City. According to writer Mark Betancourt, the facility was perfect:

The studio had everything the motion picture unit needed: six warehouse-size sound stages, prop rooms, editing bays, costume and makeup departments, even an outdoor set made to look like a city street ... The lot comprised 14 acres and dozens of buildings ...

In October the unit moved into Hal Roach Studios, which the men nicknamed "Fort Roach." Warner returned to running his company, and Lt. Col. Paul Mantz took over as commanding officer.

== Life at Fort Roach ==
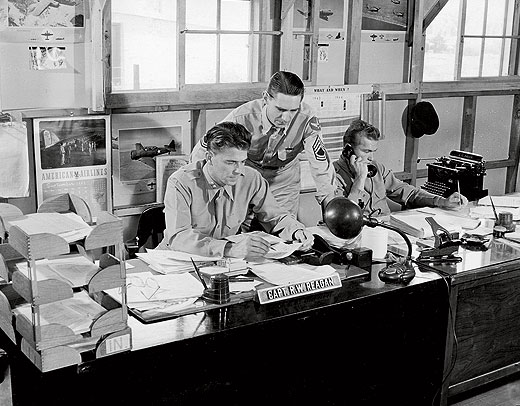
Capt. Ronald Reagan at Fort Roach

Personnel assigned to the 18th AAF Base Unit included some of the most well known film professionals of the day, as well as filmmakers who would have great success after the war. Actors such as Clark Gable, William Holden and Alan Ladd, and directors including Richard L. Bare and John Sturges served with the unit. Future president Ronald Reagan, who transferred from the cavalry reserve, was a captain in the unit. He was the personnel officer and was responsible for maintaining personnel files and orienting new recruits to the operational aspects of Fort Roach. Later he was appointed adjutant. Like the other notable actors Reagan appeared in the films produced by the unit, but to avoid distracting the audience they were eventually relegated to narrating the films.

The 18th AAF Base Unit was unique in comparison to other military units in the methods employed to obtain recruits. Many members were well into middle age and unsuitable for combat duty. Few of the men in the unit were ever sent to a war zone. Due to its special mission, the unit was able to bypass the normal recruiting channels and was empowered to draft directly. Basic Training was not as rigorous as that experienced by most servicemen. According to former unit member Howard Landres, Basic Training was mandatory, "but it wasn’t the basic-basic."

Military decorum at Fort Roach was less formal than in most units. Saluting was optional, and unit members called each other by their first names. Hal Roach Studios did not have barracks, so commuting from home was commonplace. Men from out of the area were billeted at nearby Page Military Academy.

== Film production ==
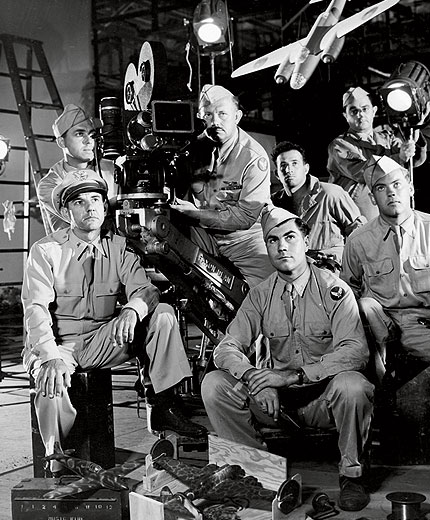
18th AAF Base Unit camera crew

The first film project undertaken was a flight training aid titled, Learn and Live. Set in "Pilot's Heaven", the feature-length film stars Guy Kibbee as Saint Peter. In order to demonstrate correct aviation techniques, twelve common flying mistakes are addressed. The film was highly regarded and led to a series of films including Land and Live in the Desert, Ditch and Live and Land and Live in the Jungle.

Resisting Enemy Interrogation was lauded by the military and according to documentarian Gregory Orr is considered to be the "best educational film" produced during the war. It tells the story of two captured flyers in dramatic and suspenseful fashion. They are interrogated at a German chateau. The layout of the chateau, the interrogation strategy and the overall experience of the film was extremely realistic. Airmen captured after viewing the film reported that they were able to successfully resist German efforts to extract information. The feature-length film was of the highest quality and in recognition the documentary was nominated for an Academy Award in 1944.

Animation was an essential and integral component of films produced at Fort Roach. Animation provided 18th AAF Base Unit filmmakers with scenarios not possible with live action photography due to technical or secrecy constraints. In an introductory training film, pilots learn how to fly airplanes with the help of colorful cartoon characters named Thrust, Gravity and Drag, representative of the forces which act on airframes. Another character, Mr. Chameleon was created to teach the fine points of military camouflage. "Trigger Joe"'s appearance in Position Firing was an immediate hit amongst gunners. Animators used humor to illustrate common pitfalls when loading and firing and techniques to maximize their efficiency and accuracy. Gunnery personnel clamored for more: "We want more films like Position Firing that make the theory simple and clear and yet keep us interested. And Trigger Joe! He's great!" Joe became the central character in an entire series of films developed to further gunnery training. The animation department was staffed with a stellar assortment of animators, including department head Rudolf Ising, one of the creators of Looney Tunes and Merrie Melodies, and one of Disney's Nine Old Men, Frank Thomas. Also assigned the unit as a sergeant was Bill Scott, later to gain fame as co-producer of The Bullwinkle Show, the "Voice of Bullwinkle" as well as many other characters. Although he was not an animator at the time, he would claim that he was kept in the unit because he was the only person who knew how to drive the stick-shift truck.

=== Bombing of Japan ===
One of the most important assignments of the unit was to develop navigational and topographic materials to support the bombing campaign against Japan. This top secret series of films, code-named "Special Film Project 152" was, according to Gregory Orr, "perhaps the most important and challenging effort to come from the First Motion Picture Unit." The unit was given forty days to produce the films which would be used by B-29 Superfortress crews.

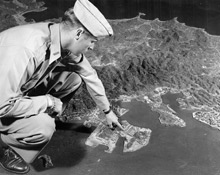
Preparation of Special Briefing Films (1945)

In 1944 the United States readied its forces in the Pacific Theatre for the final assault on the Japanese mainland. The 20th Air Force, tasked with carrying out the bombing campaign, lacked necessary information regarding flight routes and targeting data. Orr explains what the unit was expected to deliver:

every landmark, check point, initial point and bomb release point ... every radar center, every Japanese naval vessel in a harbor, every railroad, building and forest and rice paddies ... The objects had to appear not only as seen on a clear day by the naked eye, but also as viewed by a radar screen through an overcast.

After conducting extensive research on the topography of Japan, an 80-by-60-foot (24 m × 18 m) scale model (1 foot: 1 mile) of target areas was fabricated complete with mountains, buildings, railroads and the rice paddies. It also depicted clouds and fog. The films were produced using a specially mounted overhead camera. The camera was motorized and could be moved to simulate an airplane's flight over the model. According to the New York Sun, "the camera recorded what the crew of a B-29 would see from 30,000 feet." Using the films, pilots of the 20th Air Force easily found their targets and were amazed at the level of detail and the accuracy that the unit was able to produce. General Arnold said the following of the units accomplishment: "there never has been anything quite so good as this for briefing men on dangerous missions."

=== Bomb damage in Europe ===
After Nazi Germany surrendered in May 1945, General Arnold ordered Crump to document the extent of the damage caused by aerial bombardment. This project was code-named "Special Film Project 186." Crump and his crew, using color film, surveyed bomb damage inflicted on the major European cities. In addition, Crump recorded the debriefings of Nazi civilian and military personnel in Allied custody such as Hermann Göring, as well as the capture of the Ohrdruf and Buchenwald concentration camps by American soldiers. Upon viewing the film of the camps for the first time, Malvin Wald recollected, "Even though it was a summer day, Reagan came out shivering—we all did. We’d never seen anything like that."

Crump and his crew shot hundreds of hours of film—most of which has never been seen. The Army Air Forces declined to fund the production and editing of the footage at an estimated cost of $1 million. The documentary The Story of Special Film Project 186 points out that the effort was "the biggest color film project of World War II—and the biggest unseen film of all time."

== Combat cameraman training ==
A primary function of the 18th AAF Base Unit was the training of combat cameramen. The units were based at nearby Page Military Academy. There were approximately 16 combat units, each made up of seven officers and between 20 and 30 enlisted men. They were trained to use a variety of photographic equipment and cameras and also received combat and weapons training. The cameramen were sent to every army air force base to document all aspects of the base's operations as well as aerial battle tactics and enemy airplane performance. Every cameraman was trained to load film into their camera under adverse conditions, and if need be, to develop it on location. Most of the aerial motion picture photography shot during World War II was filmed by Fort Roach alumni.

Unlike regular personnel at the 18th AAF Base Unit, combat cameramen suffered a number of casualties. Alumni of the program were "highly praised and much decorated." Lt. James Bray, a cameraman trained at Fort Roach was assigned to the Ninth Air Force in Cairo, Egypt. While photographing a combat mission he shot down two Luftwaffe Messerschmitts when the gunner was wounded. For his heroism he was awarded the Distinguished Flying Cross. He then returned to Fort Roach as an instructor.

== Impact ==
Although most 18th AAF Base Unit personnel were never assigned to combat duty, they made a significant contribution to the war effort. Air & Space/Smithsonian reported that the air superiority enjoyed by the USAAF in Europe was partly due to the training films delivered by the unit. Field Marshal Wilhelm Keitel, commander in chief of Germany's armed forces, noted the decisive role played by film production units:

We had everything calculated perfectly except the speed with which the Allies were able to train their people for war. Our major miscalculation was in underestimating their quick and complete mastery of film education.

The unit's efforts did not go unnoticed by the American military. The Inspector General's office of the Department of Intelligence in an investigative report wrote:

This investigating officer cannot conclude his discussion without saying something for those sincere and patriotic officers and men who have contributed so much to the excellent work of the First Motion Picture Unit. The vast majority of its personnel have succeeded in producing training and orientation films, most of which are superior by every standard of motion picture art, training and effectiveness. Men of the First Motion Picture Unit probably represent a higher civilian income bracket than would be found in any other military organization. They are proud of their work and have a right to be so. This can also be said of the Combat Camera Units.

Noting the sheer volume of footage shot under the auspices of the unit, historian John Langellier said:

Every time you flip on the History Channel or the Discovery Channel, and you see World War II from an American perspective, you're watching the work of one of these gentlemen. That's their legacy.

== Filmography ==
James Stewart in Winning Your Wings (1942)

Burgess Meredith is The Rear Gunner (1943)

Ronald Reagan looking for bogeys in Recognition of the Japanese Zero Fighter (1943)

Wings Up (1943) was filmed at the Officer Candidate School in FL

Yehudi the Chameleon, the star of Camouflage (1944)

Animation from The Earthquakers (1944)

The Fight for the Sky (1945)

Tuskegee Airmen were featured in Wings for this Man (1945)

This is a list of selected USAAF films produced by Warner Bros. prior to the formation of the First Motion Picture Unit:

Selected Warner Bros. filmography
Year	Title	Participants	Notes
1942	Winning Your Wings	John Huston*, Owen Crump*, Jimmy Stewart, Alfred Newman (music)	Nominated for Best Documentary Academy Award
1942	Men of the Sky	B. Reeves Eason*, Owen Crump**, Tod Andrews, Eleanor Parker, Don DeFore	Original title Under Those Wings
1942	Beyond the Line of Duty	Lewis Seiler,* Ronald Reagan**	Won the Academy Award for Best Live Action Short
1943	The Rear Gunner	Ray Enright*, Ronald Reagan, Burgess Meredith	

The growing demand for training films overwhelmed Warner Bros. and the USAAF established an inhouse film production unit. Between 1942 and 1945, the 18th AAF Base Unit released over 400 films, many of which have been lost or destroyed. This list is representative of that output:

Selected 18th AAF Base Unit filmography
Year	Title	Participants	Notes
1943	Learn and Live	Bernard Vorhaus*, Guy Kibbee	
1943	Three Cadets	Craig Stevens, Kent Smith, Ralph Byrd, William T. Orr	Prevention and treatment of venereal disease
1943	Ditching: Before and After		
1943	Aircraft Wood Repair		
1943	Basic Electricity As Applied to Electronic Control Systems		
1943	Cadet Classification	Ronald Reagan**	
1943	Recognition of the Japanese Zero Fighter	Bernard Vorhaus*, Art Gilmore**, Ronald Reagan	
1943	Reconnaissance Pilot	William Holden	
1943	Wings Up	Clark Gable**, Gilbert Roland, William Holden, Robert Preston, Brenda Marshall	
1943	Photographic Intelligence in Bombardment Aviation	Alan Ladd	
1943	Flying the P-61 Series Airplane		
1943	Reconnaissance Pilot		
1943	The First Motion Picture Unit		
1944	The Earthquakers	Irving Pichel**	
1944	Flak!		
1944	Lightning: The Lockheed P-38 Story	William Holden, Dick Bong	
1944	Air Defense Team	Van Heflin	
1944	Position Firing	Mel Blanc**	Animated
1944	How to Shoot: Gunnery in the B-29	Mel Blanc**	Animated
1944	K13: Compenstating Gunsight	Mel Blanc**	Animated
1944	Air Pattern: Pacific	Van Heflin	
1944	Land and Live in the Jungle	Van Heflin	
1944	Resisting Enemy Interrogation	Bernard Vorhaus*, Arthur Kennedy, Lloyd Nolan, Mel Tormé	Nominated for Best Documentary Feature Academy Award
1944	Flight Characteristics of the P-51 Airplane		
1944	Survival of the Fittest	George Montgomery	-->
1944	Camouflage	Frank Thomas*	Animated
1944	Combat America	Clark Gable**	
1944	Ditch and Live		
1944	Memphis Belle: A Story of a Flying Fortress	William Wyler*, Robert Morgan, Vince Evans, Gail Kubik (music)	Distributed by Paramount Copy placed in the National Film Registry.
1944	Target for Today	William Keighley*	
1944	The B-17 Flying Fortress: Elementary Ground Work		
1944	B-29 Flight Procedure and Combat Crew Functioning	Eric Fleming	
1944	How to Fly the B-26 Airplane		
1945	Land and Live in the Desert	Van Heflin**	
1945	Land and Live in the Ocean		
1945	The Last Bomb	Frank Lloyd*	Nominated for Best Documentary Feature Academy Award
1945	Target Tokyo	William Keighley*, Ronald Reagan**	
1945	Time to Kill	George Reeves, Barry Nelson, DeForest Kelley, Betty White	Life in the U.S. Navy
1945	Wings for This Man	Ronald Reagan**	Tuskegee Airmen
1945	Preparation of Special Briefing Films		Special Film Project 152X
1945	The Fight for the Sky	Ronald Reagan**	
1945	Target-Invisible	Arthur Kennedy**, Clayton Moore	
1946	Army Air Forces Pacific		

Notes

* director
** narrator

== See also ==
- List of Allied propaganda films of World War II
