= Army Air Forces Gunnery Schools =

World War II USAAF training program

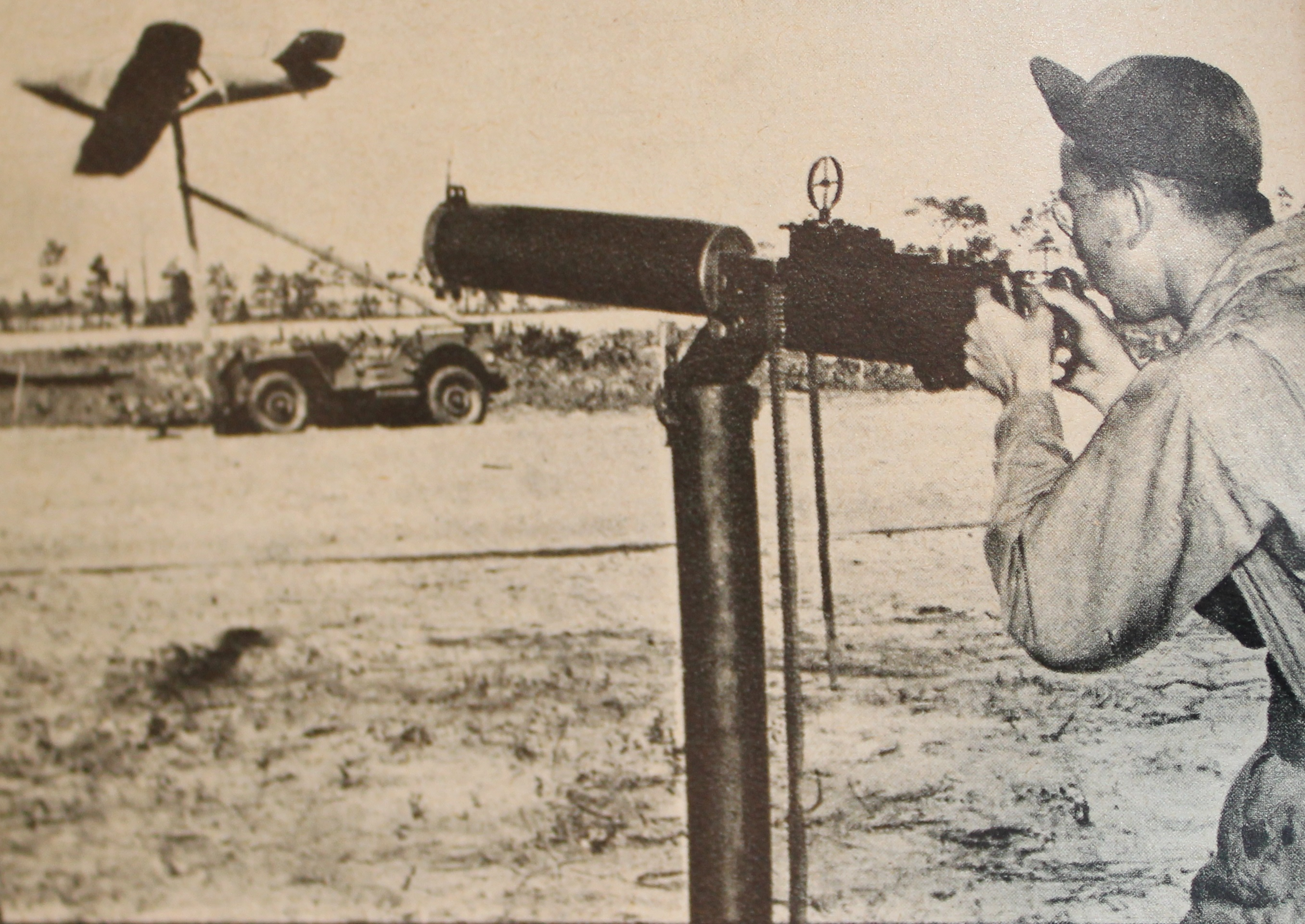
Gunnery trainee fires on a scale model aircraft mounted on moving unmanned jeep.

Army Air Forces Gunnery Schools were World War II organizations for training personnel in the skill of aerial gunnery. The several schools existed at domestic Army Airfields and gunnery ranges (3 schools opened in 1941).

"Flexible Gunnery" training developed diverse skills for various aircraft and differing positions within bombers, e.g., waist gunner, rear gunner, etc. (fixed gunnery training was used for tbd.) "The number of graduates had reached 19,789 by 7 July 1943, with another 57,176 men completing the course by the end of the year." For example, at Las Vegas Army Airfield 600 gunnery students and 215 co-pilots were graduated every five weeks at the height of World War II. Training started on the ground using mounted shotguns with fixed arcs of fire, and then shotguns mounted on the backs of trucks, which were driven through a course. Then the students went up in the bombers, shooting at targets pulled by other aircraft.

== Installations and media ==
The USAAF had a "Central Flexible Gunnery Instructors School", which collaborated on the "restricted" 1 November 1943, handbook Get That Fighter. "This book deals only with the shot when he is actually coming in at you. … Believe it or not—when a fighter is making his attack you don't aim ahead as in other shots. Always aim between him and the tail of your own plane because the forward speed of your plane is added to the speed of your bullet. … The amount you aim behind is deflection.")

- Combat America (1944), recruiting film with Clark Gable

- Buckingham Army Airfield, Florida (75th Flying Training Wing): "Flexible Gunnery"
- Harlingen Army Airfield, Texas (79th Flying Training Wing): "Flexible Gunnery"
  - Waller Gunnery Trainer, a simulator for projecting fighters on a screen, recording aiming and firing by a trainee, and indicating hits
- Las Vegas Army Airfield, Nevada (82d Flying Training Wing): "Flexible Gunnery" training began in January 1942 after flying training had begun on 20 December 1941.
  - Las Vegas Bombing and Gunnery Range
    - The Rear Gunner (1943), training film with Ronald Reagan and Burgess Meredith.
- Lowry Bombing and Gunnery Range, Colorado
- Matagorda Island Bombing and Gunnery Range, Texas
- Tonopah Army Airfield, Nevada
  - Tonopah Bombing and Gunnery Range
- Tyndall Army Airfield, Florida: "Flexible Gunnery"
- Williams Army Airfield, Arizona: "fighter gunnery school"

== Equipment ==
General Arnold on 29 June 1943 noted the "serious lack of proper aircraft and equipment to support the training", and early gunnery training had used guntruck platforms with guns mounted on the beds of pickup trucks, e.g., for firing at clay targets (guntrucks at Las Vegas AAF were only used January & February 1942.) In-flight training included firing at aircraft-towed targets, and camera guns in 1944–45 simulated fire at fighters flying mock attacks on the bombers. Las Vegas was 1 of 7 USAAF schools that used frangible bullets to fire at "specially built Bell RP-63 aircraft that simulated conventional fighter attacks against bombers", and the bullets splattered into powder when striking the RP-63, which had radiosonic equipment for a wing lamp to flash so the gunners could identify a hit.

"At the beginning of 1944, flexible gunnery still lacked proper equipment, especially turrets and sights that automatically compensated for the movement of the aircralt and the target, and it also lacked a definitely established training doctrine. To promote the latter and provide better direction, the command established a deputy commander for flexible gunnery within the headquarters on 10 July 1944".

=== Simulators ===
Harlingen AAF had a Waller Gunnery Trainer for firing at "planes projected on a screen", and B-29 Flexible Gunnery Training at Buckingham, Harlingen, and Las Vegas included the "manipulation trainer". The manipulation trainer used 12 towers at heights of 10–40 feet (3.0–12.2 m) and arranged like a B-29 formation. Each tower had 2 nose, 2 tail, 2 ring sighting, and 4 blister positions for students to fire camera guns against simulated attacks by PT-13 and PT-17 Stearman biplane aircraft.

External images
- At Buckingham Field in Florida, a …target car is readied for flexible gunnery practice.
- guntruck at Las Vegas AAF
