= Freaky =

Freaky may refer to:

- Freaky (TV series), a New Zealand children's program
- Freaky (film), a 2020 horror-comedy film from Blumhouse Productions
- "Freaky" (Koda Kumi song), 2006
- "Freaky!", a 2020 song by Italian singer Senhit, San Marino's entry for the Eurovision Song Contest 2020
- Freaky (album), a 1996 album by MN8
- Freakies, a breakfast cereal brand
- "Freaky", a song by Big Sean from the album Hall of Fame (2013)

== See also ==
- Freak (disambiguation)
- FreakyLinks, an American television show
- Freaky Styley, a 1985 album by American alternative rock band Red Hot Chili Peppers
- Freaky Eaters (British TV programme), a BBC documentary about people on restricted diets
- Freaky Stories, a Canadian television series
- Freaky Friday (disambiguation)
