= Men of the Sky =

Men of the Sky may refer to:

- Men of the Sky (1931 film), American pre-Code musical drama
- Men of the Sky (1942 film), American WWII morale boosting short in Technicolor

== See also ==
- Sky People (disambiguation)
- Men Against the Sky, 1940 American drama film
- The Man in the Sky, 1957 British suspense film
