= Hewitt T. Wheless =

United States Air Force general (1913–1986)

General Hewitt T. Wheless
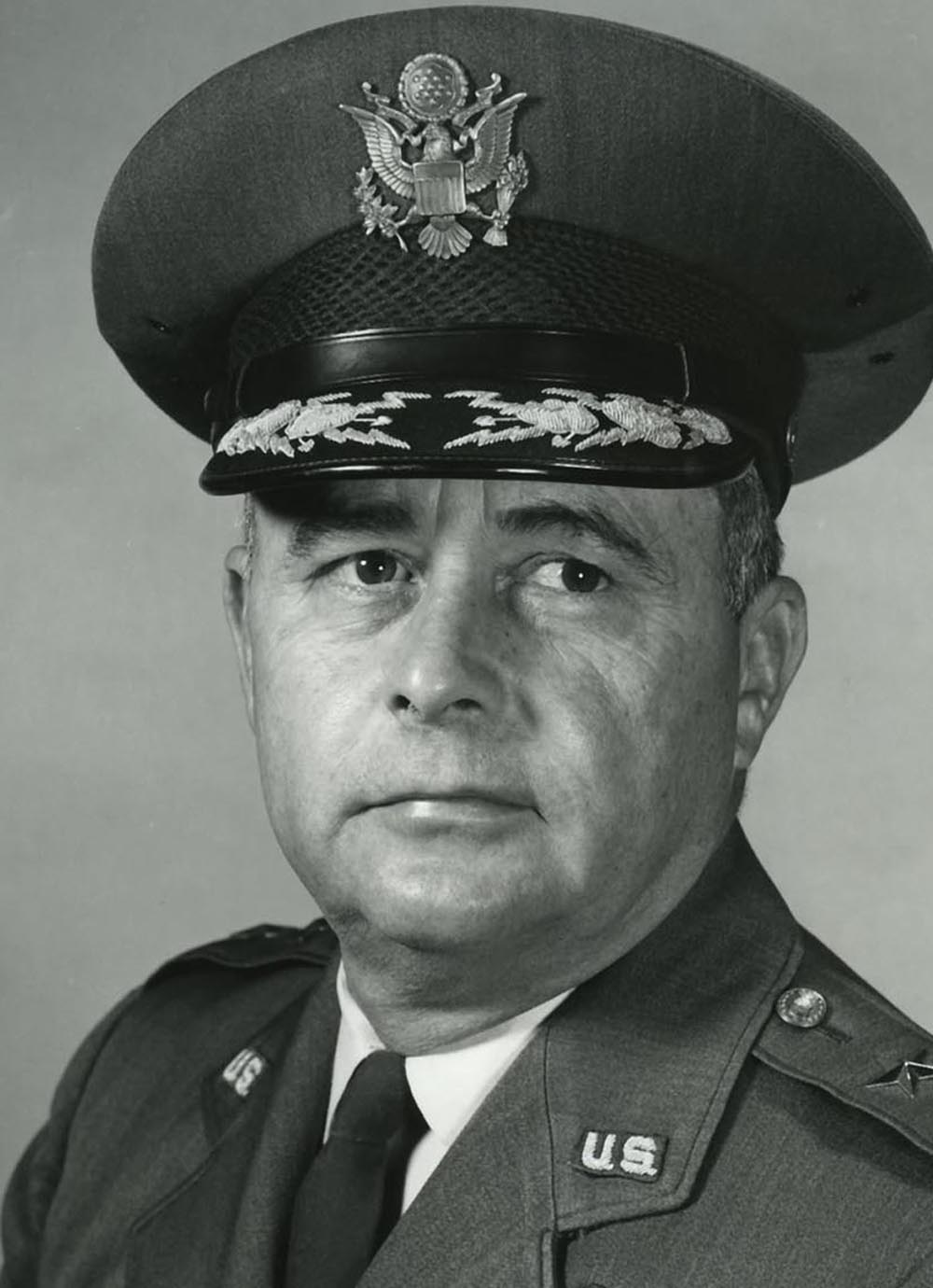
- Lieutenant General Hewitt T. Wheless
- Born: October 13, 1913; Menard County, Texas
- Died: September 7, 1986 (aged 72); Tucson, Arizona
- Burial place: Arlington National Cemetery
- Military career
- Branch: United States Army Air Forces; United States Air Force
- Service years: 1935–1968
- Rank: Lieutenant general
- Nickname: Shorty
- Awards: Distinguished Service Cross; Distinguished Flying Cross; Air Force Distinguished Service Medal; Legion of Merit; Air Medal

Hewitt Terrell Wheless (October 13, 1913 – September 7, 1986) was a United States Air Force officer known for his heroism on a bombing mission against Japanese ships in the Philippines on December 14, 1941, a week after the Japanese attack on Pearl Harbor. He was awarded the Distinguished Service Cross and mentioned by name in Franklin Roosevelt's Fireside Chat on April 28, 1942. In 1947, he was assigned to the Strategic Air Command and was named SAC chief of staff in 1962. He was assigned to Headquarters U.S. Air Force in 1963 and retired in June 1968 as Assistant Vice Chief of Staff of the Air Force.

== Early years ==
Hewitt Wheless was born in Menard County, Texas, in 1913. He graduated from Gulf Coast Military Academy at Gulfport, Mississippi, in May 1932, and attended the University of Texas from 1933 until 1936, graduating with a degree in civil engineering.

== Army Air Corps ==
Wheless was commissioned a second lieutenant in the infantry reserve on January 7, 1935. In June 1938, he began pilot training as an aviation cadet at Randolph Field, Texas, and graduated at Kelly Field, Texas. He was commissioned a second lieutenant in the Army Air Corps Reserve on May 26, 1939. His first assignment was as assistant operations officer of the 38th Reconnaissance Squadron at March Field, California.

== Pacific Theater during World War II ==
In October 1941, he went with the 19th Bombardment Group to the Philippine Islands and then to Java and Australia.

On 14 December 1941, then Lieutenant Wheless was the pilot of a B-17 on a mission to attack Japanese warships and transports in the harbor at Legaspi, Philippine Islands. Wheless's bomber was attacked by eighteen enemy fighters; three gunners were wounded and a fourth killed. The airplane was able to drop its bombs and seven fighters were reportedly downed. Wheless was able to return to base and land the aircraft safely in the dark with three flat tires. Wheless's heroism was noted in Franklin Roosevelt's Fireside Chat on April 28, 1942.

In April 1942, Wheless returned to the United States. He served as operations officer for the 34th Bombardment Group at Geiger Field, Spokane, Washington. In December 1942, he was assigned as deputy commander of the 88th Bombardment Group at Walla Walla, Washington, where he later became commander. From October 1943 to June 1944, he was operations staff officer at Second Air Force Headquarters, Colorado Springs, Colorado.

Again going overseas in June 1944, Wheless served as director of operations for the 314th Bombardment Wing at North Field, Guam. He returned to the United States and went to Fort Worth Army Air Field, Texas, where he served as deputy chief of staff, operations, for the 58th Bombardment Wing. A year later, he was assigned in the same capacity to the Eighth Air Force, and in December 1946 assumed command of the 7th Bombardment Group.

== Strategic Air Command ==
In August 1947, General Wheless was assigned to Strategic Air Command (SAC) Headquarters at Andrews Army Air Field, Maryland, as chief of the Operations Division, and in December 1948 moved with the command to Offutt Air Force Base, Nebraska, where he was the deputy director of operations. In April 1950, he went to Barksdale Air Force Base, Louisiana, in the same capacity for the Second Air Force.

Still with SAC, General Wheless went to England in July 1951 as director of operations for the Seventh Air Division. He returned to the Second Air Force in October 1952 to become director of operations. In November 1953, he assumed command of the 306th Bombardment Wing at MacDill Air Force Base, Florida, and the following April assumed command of the 801st Air Division at Lockbourne Air Force Base, Columbus, Ohio.

Assigned to Headquarters U.S. Air Force, Washington, D.C., in April 1957, General Wheless was designated chief, War Plans Division, deputy chief of staff, operations. In a reorganization in July 1957, he was transferred to the Directorate of Plans as the deputy chief of staff, plans and programs, with no change in duty. In July 1958, he became deputy director for war plans, deputy chief of staff, plans and programs, and in September 1958 became director of plans.

In September 1960, General Wheless became the SAC director of plans, and in July 1962 he was named SAC chief of staff.

In June 1963, he was assigned to Headquarters U.S. Air Force as the assistant deputy chief of staff, programs and requirements. He became deputy chief of staff, programs and requirements, in February 1964 and was promoted to lieutenant general. In February 1965, he became assistant vice chief of staff, U.S. Air Force, Washington, D.C. In addition, he was appointed senior Air Force member, Military Staff Committee, United Nations, in August 1967.

Lieutenant General Hewitt Terrell Wheless was assistant vice chief of staff, U.S. Air Force. In this position, he was the principal assistant to the chief of staff and the vice chief of staff in the discharge of their duties, and acted for them on matters not requiring their personal attention. He assisted in the implementation and review of policies, plans and programs, and in the overall direction of the U.S. Air Force. As an additional duty, General Wheless was the senior Air Force member, Military Staff Committee, United Nations. In this capacity, he provided the United States representation on the Military Staff Committee in accordance with the terms of the charter of the United Nations and furnishes military advice and assistance to the United States Mission to the United Nations.

He is buried in Arlington National Cemetery, Section 30.

== Decorations ==
His decorations include the Distinguished Service Cross, Air Force Distinguished Service Medal, Legion of Merit with two oak leaf clusters, Distinguished Flying Cross with oak leaf cluster, and the Air Medal with oak leaf cluster. He is rated a command pilot and navigator.

== See also ==
- Beyond the Line of Duty – 1942 film reenacting the life and career of Wheless
