= Kings of the Turf =

1941 film

- Directed by: Del Frazier
- Written by: Harold Medford
- Starring: Knox Manning
- Cinematography: L. William O'Connell
- Edited by: Louis Lindsay
- Music by: Rex Dunn
- Production company: Warner Bros.
- Release date: September 27, 1941
- Running time: 10 minutes
- Country: United States
- Language: English

Kings of the Turf is a 1941 American short documentary film about horse racing, directed by Del Frazier and written by Harold Medford.

== Cast ==
- Knox Manning as commentator (voice)

== Accolades ==
It was nominated for an Academy Award at the 14th Academy Awards for Best Short Subject (One-Reel).
