= Target for Today =

1944 film by William Keighley

- DVD cover
- Directed by: William Keighley
- Music by: Alexander Steinert
- Production company: First Motion Picture Unit
- Distributed by: U.S. Government
- Release date: 1944
- Running time: 90 minutes
- Language: English

Target for Today is a documentary film describing the preparation and mounting of a United States Army Air Forces raid on East Prussia. It contains much combat footage of B-17 and B-24 bombers and named for the phrase used at briefings before air raids.

The October 1943 footage was filmed during Eighth Air Force attacks on Nazi Germany industrial targets in Anklam, the 22nd Air Base in Marienburg (on the 9th), and Gdynia in occupied Poland. Prior to the combat footage, the documentary explains Operation Pointblank target selection and depicts planning, briefing, and preparation.

== See also ==
- 22nd Air Base
