= Sky People (disambiguation) =

Sky People may refer to:

- "Sky People", a 1985 rock song
- Sky people, Earthlings' names for immigrants from The Ark, on The 100 TV series
- The Sky People, a 1959 science-fiction novel in the Maurai series by Poul Anderson
- The Sky People, a 2006 science-fiction novel by S. M. Stirling

== See also ==
- Men of the Sky (disambiguation)
- "People of the Sky"
