= The Last Bomb =

1945 propaganda/documentary film directed by Frank Lloyd

- Directed by: Frank Lloyd
- Production company: First Motion Picture Unit
- Distributed by: Warner Bros.
- Release date: 1945
- Running time: 35 minutes
- Country: United States
- Language: English

The Last Bomb was a 1945 propaganda film mainly concerning the conventional phase of the bombing of Japan in 1945. It was nominated for an Academy Award for Best Documentary Feature.

The film begins by describing the taking off points in Saipan, Guam, and Tinian, remarking how they have changed since American occupation. General Curtis LeMay is shown planning a daylight raid on Japan's industrial areas.

Squadrons of B-29s then assemble and the audience rides with them through a space of ocean as wide as the US from Mexico to Canada, special attention being given to the island Iwo Jima, which is midway through the journey, the base for P-51 fighters that will escort the bombers. The film then proceeds to the actual bombing of Japan, showing one of the B-29s in combat with Japanese fighters, dogfights between the escorting P-51s and Japanese aircraft and the destruction leveled on Tokyo by the B-29s' payload and subsequent strafing by the escort fighters.

When the bombers return to base, the hazards of war are assessed, particularly the problems associated with landing the large planes, often damaged by Japanese flak or fighters, which could sometimes be fatal.

At the very end some color footage of the mushroom cloud at Nagasaki is shown, the narrator, Reed Hadley, telling us that it saves thousands of American lives by preventing an invasion of Japan.
