= Cinema of Northern Mariana Islands =

History of cinema in the Northern Mariana Islands

A small independent cinema of Northern Mariana Islands scene, producing mostly documentary films, developed in the 21st century thanks to the efforts of the Commonwealth of the Northern Mariana Islands and of the Northern Marianas College. Films had already been shot in the islands in the 20th century by foreign producers.

== Foreign productions shot in the Northern Mariana Islands ==
In 1945, the US Air Forces produced in the islands Target Tokyo, a 22-minute documentary about the training in Saipan of American pilots before the first bombing mission to Tokyo. Future U.S. president Ronald Reagan was the narrator. General Henry H. Arnold starred as himself.

After World War II, the Commonwealth slowly promoted the islands as possible locations for movies. In 1983, the Japanese comedy Daijōbu, My Friend, starring Peter Fonda was shot in Saipan. The Commonwealth's Legislature later commented that "it was responsible for excellent media exposure and a large budget spent on the island for two months". Subsequent films depicting World War II in the Northern Marianas, however, included only short footage of the islands. The American film Windtalkers (2002) was mostly shot in the Hawaii and the Japanese Oba: The Last Samurai (2011) in Thailand.

Some scenes of the 2003 romantic South Korean movie ...ing were shot in Saipan.

== The Commonwealth Film, Video and Media Office ==
On 14 November 2002, Bill PL 13-29 entered into force, which resulted in a new § 2151 of the Commonwealth Code. The bill mentioned that the Northern Mariana Islands offer "outstanding and unique human and natural resources for the development of a strong motion picture, film, video and media industry." It established within the Marianas Visitors Authority (MVA), a Commonwealth Film, Video and Media Office, also known as the Northern Mariana Islands Film Office. A national Film Manager heads the Office. The body has two purposes. First, it should attract foreign companies to produce movies in the Commonwealth through publicity, participation of the Film Manager and other officers in international cinema trade shows, and the improvement of the infrastructures in the islands. Second, it should develop a local cinema industry.

The article has been subsequently revised, with further proposals for amendments, as the proposed results were only partially achieved. The Commonwealth noted with satisfaction that one season of the Japanese version of Survivor was filmed in Rota, and one of the Chinese version in Tinian.

== The Northern Marianas College and efforts to develop local productions ==
The Commonwealth has placed high hopes on the ability of the Northern Marianas College to train local filmmakers through courses on cinematography. The college was also equipped with "state-of-the-art facilities and equipment such as a production studio, a post production editing studio, and a video booth." In 2000, Butch Wolf, a professional American sound effect editor who lived in Saipan, cooperated with the college to create the Pacific Rim Academy, aimed at teaching local students the fundamentals of film-making. In 2001, the Pacific Rim Academy ended its partnership with the Northern Marianas College and continued as a private for-profit company under the name Talk Story Studios, which specialized in producing commercials.

Galvin Deleon Guerrero, a teacher at Northern Marianas College and the principal of Saipan's Mount Carmel School, continued to work with students independently of Talk Story Studio. In 2017, he directed We Drank Our Tears: Francisco Babauta’s Story, a short movie about a family of islanders who lived on a cave to escape the Japanese during World War II. The film was shot in Ladder Beach and American Memorial Park in Saipan and the actors were students, or former students, of Guerrero's cinematography courses. We Drank Our Tears was nominated for several awards at the 2017 Guam International Film Festival. Guerrero went on to direct other short movies about the experiences of Northern Mariana islanders during World War II, including Benjamin Abadilla's Story, which was also honored at the Guam International Film Festival, in 2018, where two of Guerrero's students, Angelo Manese and Justin Ocampo, presented another film in the same war series, Rafael Mafnas’ Story. In 2019, two former female students of Guerrero, Jenikah Elayda and Cesiah Maclang, were honored at the International Thespian Festival in Lincoln, Nebraska for their documentary Starting Over Again about the aftermath of Typhoon Yutu. The film was subsequently screened at a charity event in Hollywood.

A different kind of documentary movie was directed by Walter Manglona in 2018. The Forgotten Island was about the senior citizens of Saipan, who starred as themselves. Although Manglona had some training in directing and screenwriting, all actors were amateurs.

While all these were documentaries, in 2016 the first feature film shot for a significant part in Saipan and Tinian, Gehenna: Where Death Lives, premiered. The producers of the supernatural horror movie were American and Japanese, and the director was Hiroshi Katagiri from Japan. However, the crew, extras, and some actors were from Saipan, and the Commonwealth supported the production, which was also helped by local citizens who participated in its crowdfunding. It was hoped that the movie, as "the first film of its kind not only to be shot on Saipan but also for the plot to take place here," may encourage "Marianas-bred filmmakers" to start more ambitious local projects.
