= Cattle Queen of Montana =

1954 film by Allan Dwan

- Original poster
- Directed by: Allan Dwan
- Screenplay by: Robert Blees; Howard Estabrook
- Story by: Tom W. Blackburn
- Produced by: Benedict Bogeaus
- Starring: Barbara Stanwyck; Ronald Reagan; Gene Evans
- Cinematography: John Alton
- Edited by: Carlo Lodato
- Music by: Louis Forbes
- Production company: Filmcrest Productions
- Distributed by: RKO Radio Pictures
- Release date: November 18, 1954
- Running time: 88 minutes
- Country: United States
- Language: English

Cattle Queen of Montana is a 1954 American Western film shot in Technicolor directed by Allan Dwan and starring Barbara Stanwyck and Ronald Reagan. The supporting cast includes Gene Evans, Lance Fuller, Jack Elam, Chubby Johnson, and Morris Ankrum.

== Plot ==
Pop Jones inherits a piece of family land in Montana, so he and his daughter, Sierra Nevada, decide to leave their Texas ranch and move there. As she bathes in a pond along the trail, Sierra Nevada encounters a stranger, Farrell, a hired gunman who warns her about dangerous Indians nearby.

Farrell is on his way to work for Tom McCord, a rich rancher. Quite a bit of rustling has been going on in the territory of late. McCord is in cahoots with Indians, in particular Natchakoa of the Blackfoot tribe, whose braves stampede the Jones family's cattle, knock Sierra cold, wound her cowhand Nat and kill Pop, after which McCord steals a document from Pop's dead body that grants rights to the land.

Sierra is nursed back to health by Colorados, a young Blackfoot who attends school among the whites, to the displeasure of the tribal chief, his father. McCord offers a $2,000 bounty to Farrell if he kills Sierra and Nat, but instead Farrell comes to her rescue.

Farrell reveals that he is actually an agent for the U.S. Cavalry, investigating the rustling and killing. With the help of Sierra, he blows up a McCord wagon filled with ammunition being sold to the Indians, doing away with McCord once and for all and bringing peace to the territory at last.

== Cast ==
- Barbara Stanwyck as Sierra Nevada Jones
- Ronald Reagan as Farrell
- Gene Evans as Tom McCord
- Lance Fuller as Colorados
- Anthony Caruso as Natchakoa
- Jack Elam as Yost
- Yvette Duguay as Starfire
- Morris Ankrum as J.I. 'Pop' Jones
- Chubby Johnson as Nat Collins
- Myron Healey as Hank
- Rodd Redwing as Powhani
- Hugh Sanders as Col. Carrington
- Byron Foulger as Land Office Employee
- Burt Mustin as Dan

== Critical response ==
Variety reported that the film was "a listless and ordinary western" with a "screenplay [that] is short on imagination and long on cliche," and that "Allan Dwan's direction is slow moving." A review of the film in The New York Times described Stanwyck as "pretty as a Western sunset in her curly, carrot colored hairdo," but that she "is given little to do except chase around the lush mountain greenery and shoot it out with the bad men;" Reagan's performance was described as "stalwart and obvious."

== Influence ==
In the 1985 film Back to the Future, Marty McFly travels back to 1955 and notices the Cattle Queen of Montana displayed on the marquee at the Essex Theater in Hill Valley.

Cattle Queen of Montana was the last film Reagan watched during his presidency of the United States. He watched the film on January 14, 1989, six days before leaving the presidency.

== See also ==
- List of American films of 1954
- Ronald Reagan filmography
