= A Welcome to Britain =

1943 training film for the US Armed Forces

A Welcome To Britain (retitled How to Behave in Britain) is a 1943 training film for the United States Armed Forces which was narrated (and co-written and co-directed) by Burgess Meredith and Anthony Asquith. The film explains to United States troops being deployed to Europe for the invasion of Normandy how they should act and behave in the United Kingdom. It demonstrates appropriate behaviour and depicts what is expected in given social situations. Though produced for American viewing, the film was produced by the UK's Ministry of Information through the Strand Film Company, which specialized in making documentaries in the 1930s and '40s. It was co-written by the Hollywood writer Sam Spewack, who came to Britain with Meredith.

== Plot ==
Race relations scene from A Welcome to Britain

The film focuses on the importance of respecting, or at least acknowledging, cultural differences between American personnel and the British people in order to avoid unnecessary misunderstandings. Notable settings and situations in the film include British pubs, how to behave when invited to dinner, and the friendly relationship between the RAF and the USAAF. The film provides examples of how to interact with several varied groups of people: children, strangers, prostitutes and military officers. American generals Jacob L. Devers, John C. H. Lee and Ira C. Eaker, actress Beatrice Lillie and comedian Bob Hope also appear in the film.

The film also discourages soldiers from patronizing prostitutes.

A Welcome to Britain portrays the different attitude towards race in the United Kingdom, which was generally more progressive than those in the United States. Referring to Black soldiers as "coloureds" and "negroes", the film depicts a British woman inviting an African American soldier for tea. To ameliorate American attitudes over racial segregation or impropriety, an elderly white woman was used to portray the hostess rather than a young woman. This segment was intended primarily for white American service personnel, to encourage them to adopt a "veneer of ethnic tolerance" while in Great Britain.

== Reception ==
The film was very well-received by British critics. A number of British newspapers called for its general release, though it was not released for viewing by the British public during the war. The Daily Mail said that it "should do more than any other stroke to create a genuine Anglo-American understanding". Polling of GI audiences also revealed very positive attitudes.
