= Men of the Sky (1942 film) =

- Film poster
- Directed by: B. Reeves Eason
- Written by: Owen Crump
- Produced by: Gordon Hollingshead
- Starring: Tod Andrews; Eleanor Parker; Don DeFore
- Narrated by: Owen Crump
- Cinematography: Arthur L. Todd
- Edited by: Harold McLernon
- Music by: Howard Jackson (uncredited); William Lava (uncredited)
- Production company: U.S. Army Signal Corps Photographic Section
- Distributed by: Warner Bros.
- Release date: July 25, 1942
- Running time: 20 minutes
- Country: United States
- Language: English

Men of the Sky is a 1942 American Technicolor short propaganda film, directed by B. Reeves Eason. The documentary film reenacted the training of a group of United States Army Air Forces (USAAF) pilots.

Following the attack on Pearl Harbor, Hollywood rushed to turn out films that would help to help win the war. The studios produced more than features, with countless cartoons and short subjects that were intended to inform the public, boost morale, encourage support of the Red Cross and other organizations that were helping at home and overseas or in recruitment. There were also films that were shown only to members of the armed forces. These films either trained them or entertained them.

Men of the Sky is one of the best examples of how Hollywood pitched in and worked to boost morale and also recruit men and women into military service. Along with Don DeFore and Tod Andrews, Eleanor Parker has a leading role. Each of the leads would go on to lengthy screen and television careers.

== Plot ==
In 1942, the stories of a new group of U.S. Army Air Forces pilots are intertwined. As they receive their wings from Lt. General H.H. Arnold, each of the trainees, Cadet Frank Bickley (Tod Andrews), Cadet Dick Mathews (Don DeFore) and Cadet Jim Morgan (Ray Montgomery) recall their prewar introduction to flight training. In their first assignments as pilots, they are flying aircraft and airlifting matériel to General MacArthur in Australia.

== Cast ==
- Tod Andrews as Cadet Frank Bickley (credited as Michael Ames)
- Eleanor Parker as Mrs. Frank Bickley
- Don DeFore as Cadet Dick Mathews
- Ray Montgomery as Cadet Jim Morgan
- Ruth Ford as Cadet Gladdens' Sweetheart
- Dave Willock as Bob "Sir Galahad" Gladdens (credited as David Willock)
- Henry H. Arnold as himself ("Hap") Arnold (uncredited)

== Production ==
Men of the Sky was the second film short released by Warner Brothers with cooperation from the United States Army Air Force and its nascent First Motion Picture Unit, the first military unit entirely composed of professionals from the film industry. The growing demand for training films became overwhelming for Warner Brothers and the First Motion Picture Unit took over as the USAAF’s primary film production unit, releasing over 400 films before the war’s end. (Note: "America the Beautiful" is heard playing at the end of the film.)

== Reception ==
Men of the Sky was typical of the propaganda films of the period produced under the auspices of the Office of War Information. The film was distributed and exhibited by Warner Bros. under the auspices of the Motion Picture Committee Cooperating for National Defense. Men of the Sky was the second wartime film short produced by Warner Brothers Studios and proved popular with audiences. (Note: Warner Bros. had previously produced a short film, Winning Your Wings (1942) starring Jimmy Stewart.)

== See also ==
- List of American films of 1942
- Ronald Reagan filmography
- First Motion Picture Unit
