= Waller Gunnery Trainer =

World War II gunnery simulator

The Waller Gunnery Trainer was a simulator for training World War II aerial gunners using multiple film projectors. Its inventor, Fred Waller, later invented the Cinerama film format.

== See also ==
- First Motion Picture Unit
