= Beyond the Line of Duty =

1942 film

- Title frame
- Directed by: Lewis Seiler
- Written by: Edwin Gilbert
- Produced by: Gordon Hollingshead
- Narrated by: Ronald Reagan
- Cinematography: Arthur L. Todd
- Music by: Howard Jackson; William Lava
- Production company: The U.S. Army Signal Corps Photographic Section
- Distributed by: Warner Bros.
- Release date: November 7, 1942
- Running time: 22 minutes
- Country: United States
- Language: English

Beyond the Line of Duty is a 1942 American short propaganda film, directed by Lewis Seiler. The documentary film reenacted the life and career of United States Army Air Corps Captain Hewitt T. "Shorty" Wheless.

Following the attack on Pearl Harbor, Hollywood rushed to turn out films that would help to win the war. The studios produced more than features, with countless cartoons and short subjects that were intended to inform the public, boost morale, encourage support of the Red Cross and other organizations that were helping at home and overseas or in recruitment. There were also films that were shown only to members of the armed forces. These films either trained them or entertained them.

Beyond the Line of Duty is one of the best examples of how Hollywood pitched in and worked to boost morale and also recruit men and women into military service. The film won the Oscar for Best Short Subject at the 15th Academy Awards in 1943.

== Plot ==
In 1942, the story of the heroism of an airman was introduced in the April 28 Fireside Chat by President Franklin Delano Roosevelt. The story relates to the life and career of Hewitt T. Wheless as a bomber pilot in the United States Army Air Corps (USAAC). Beginning when Wheless, working as a ranch hand in Texas, joined the Army Air Corps in 1938, the account follows through theoretical and practical training in courses at Randolph Field, Texas. He later graduated as a pilot, receiving his wings at Kelly Field, Texas.

Qualifying as a bomber pilot, Lt. Wheless was stationed in the Philippines with the 19th Bombardment Group. On December 14, 1941, in the first weeks of World War II, Wheless was the pilot of a four-engine Boeing B-17 Flying Fortress heavy bomber assigned a bombing mission to attack Japanese warships and transports in the harbor at Legaspi, Philippine Islands.

While Wheless was able to successfully complete his mission, his bomber was attacked by 18 enemy fighters. During the running aerial battle, three gunners were wounded and a fourth killed while seven fighters were reportedly downed. Wheless was able to return to base and land the aircraft safely in the dark with three flat tires.

In his nationwide address, President Roosevelt praised the pilot's extraordinary heroism and noted that Wheless had received the Distinguished Flying Cross. In a tribute to the remarkable strength of his B-17 bomber, Captain Wheless later gave a speech at the Boeing factory in Seattle, thanking the workers.

== Cast ==
- Hewitt T. Wheless as himself (as Captain Hewett T. Wheless)
- Ronald Reagan as narrator (voice)
- Franklin Delano Roosevelt as himself (voice) (archive footage)
- Hubert R. Harmon as himself (as Major General H.K. Harmon)
- William Hopper as University of Texas classmate
- Glenn Strange as Cal
- Knox Manning as Radio announcer

== Production ==
Beyond the Line of Duty was produced with the full cooperation of the USAAC, with Captain Wheless serving as a technical advisor. The film begins with the strains of the fourth verse of the "Air Corps Song":

Off we go into the wild sky yonder, Keep the wings level and true;
If you'd live to be a gray haired wonder, keep the nose out of the blue.
Flying men, guarding the nation's borders, we'll be there followed by more!
In echelon, we carry on, for nothing can stop the Army Air Corps! (Note: The "Air Corps Song" later re-worded and renamed the "Air Force Song" was introduced in 1938 and in the film. is heard playing on a portable radio broadcast in 1938.)

== Reception ==
Beyond the Line of Duty was typical of the propaganda films of the period produced under the auspices of the Office of War Information. The film was distributed and exhibited by Warner Bros. under the auspices of the Motion Picture Committee Cooperating for National Defense. Beyond the Line of Duty was the third wartime film short produced by Warner Brothers Studios and proved popular with audiences. (Note: Warner Bros. had previously produced two short films, Winning Your Wings (1942) starring Jimmy Stewart and Men of the Sky (1942) and would release only one further wartime short, The Rear Gunner (1943).)

=== Awards ===
Beyond the Line of Duty won an Academy Award at the 15th Academy Awards in 1943 for Best Short Subject (Two-Reel).
