= Freaky Friday (disambiguation) =

Freaky Friday is a 1972 children's book by Mary Rodgers.

Freaky Friday may also refer to:

== Arts and entertainment ==
=== Freaky Friday franchise ===
- Freaky Friday (franchise), including:
  - Freaky Friday (1976 film), starring Jodie Foster and Barbara Harris
  - Freaky Friday (1995 film), a Disney television film adaptation starring Gaby Hoffmann and Shelley Long
  - Freaky Friday (2003 film), a remake starring Lindsay Lohan and Jamie Lee Curtis
    - Freaky Friday (soundtrack)
  - Freaky Friday (musical), 2016
  - Freaky Friday (2018 film), a 2018 television film adaptation of the musical
  - Freakier Friday, the sequel to the 2003 film

=== Music ===
- "Freaky Friday" (song), by Lil Dicky featuring Chris Brown, 2018
- "Freaky Friday", a song by Aqua from the 2000 album Aquarius

=== Television ===
- "Fencer's Freaky Friday", Foofur season 1, episode 9b (1986)
- "Freaky Friday", 8 Simple Rules season 3, episode 18 (2005)
- "Freaky Friday", Beavis and Butt-Head season 9, episode 16 (2022)
- "Freaky Friday", NewsRadio season 5, episode 20 (1999)
- "Freaky Fri-Day-Day", That Girl Lay Lay season 2, episode 8 (2022)

== Other uses ==
- "Freaky Friday", or triple witching hour, a stock market term
- Freaky Friday the 13th, the working title the 2020 slasher film Freaky

== See also ==
- "Far-Out Friday", a 1993 episode of 2 Stupid Dogs
- "Freaky Monday", a 2009 episode of The Garfield Show
- Freaky Flyday, a 2015 novel by Dave Wolverton, the third in the Ravenspell trilogy
