= Knox Manning =

American actor (1904–1980)

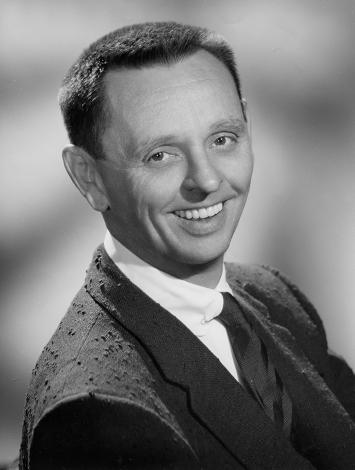
- Born: January 17, 1904; Worcester, Massachusetts
- Died: August 26, 1980 (aged 76); Woodland Hills, Los Angeles, California
- Occupation: Actor
- Years active: 1939–1956

Charles Knox Manning (January 17, 1904 – August 26, 1980) was an American film actor. He was born in Worcester, Massachusetts and died in Woodland Hills, Los Angeles, California. He and Annette North Manning are interred at Ivy Lawn Cemetery in Ventura, California.

== Motion pictures ==
A former radio newscaster at KNX and announcer, Manning entered the motion picture field in 1939 as an offscreen narrator. His distinctive voice and phrasing were noticed by other studios, and he quickly became one of the movies' busiest voice artists. Very often he was the trademark voice of several concurrent series. From 1940 to 1954 he was the narrator of Columbia Pictures' popular adventure serials, reading the sometimes tongue-in-cheek scripts with enthusiasm. (The voice-overs in the Batman TV series of the 1960s owe much of their style to Knox Manning's breezy but urgent narrations of the 1940s, including his work in the two Batman movie serials.) Away from Columbia, he was the commentator for Warner Brothers' historical, musical, and novelty short subjects. He made his services available to independent producers as well, bringing equal vigor to a religious drama and an anti-vice crusade.

In 1943 he joined RKO Radio Pictures' Flicker Flashbacks crew and became that series' most prolific narrator, working in more than half of the series' 34 comedies. Trade reviewers constantly praised this series of antique silent films re-edited with satirical soundtracks, and often singled out Knox Manning's comic timing as an important asset.

Manning left Columbia in 1954 (when producer Sam Katzman economized drastically on the studio's last four serials) and began working in Warner Brothers' publicity department, lending his voice to TV commercials for current Warner feature films.

He appeared on camera in only a handful of films, most prominently (as himself) in the 1941 military comedy Tanks a Million, the 1942 sports drama Harmon of Michigan, starring Tom Harmon, and the 1946 comedy feature Mr. Hex, starring The Bowery Boys.

== Radio ==
Knox Manning continued to work in radio as a performer and producer. He announced and read commercials for The Adventures of Sherlock Holmes, starring Basil Rathbone and Nigel Bruce. The Knox Manning Show, also known as Cinderella Story, chronicled the rise to fame of Hollywood celebrities. His Behind the Scenes program featured dramatized re-creations of news events involving famous historical figures. A similar program, This Is the Story, looked at people, places, and things that were familiar on the American scene. He was a newscaster for CBS Radio, and continued to work as a newsman in local California radio into the 1960s.

== Partial filmography ==
=== Short subjects, as narrator ===
- Wild Boar Hunt (1940, Bow and Arrow Adventures)
- Lions for Sale (1941, Sports Parade)
- Polo with the Stars (1941)
- Kings of the Turf (1941, Sports Parade)
- Carnival of Rhythm with Katherine Dunham (1941, Technicolor Specials)
- At the Stroke of Twelve (1941)
- Soldiers in White (1942, Technicolor Specials)
- Divide and Conquer (1943)
- Beyond the Line of Duty (1942)
- The Rear Gunner (1943)
- Jammin' the Blues (1944, Melody Masters)
- California, Here We Are (1944, Sports Parade)
- Spade Cooley, King of Western Swing (1945, Melody Masters)
- Story of a Dog (1945)
- So You Think You're Allergic (1945, Joe McDoakes)
- Hitler Lives? (1945)
- Cavalcade of Archery (1946, Sports Parade)
- Peeks at Hollywood (1946)
- Facing Your Danger (1946)
- The Riding Hannefords (1946)
- Adventures in South America (1946)
- Stan Kenton and His Orchestra (1947, Melody Masters)
- A Day at Hollywood Park (1947, Sports Parade)
- Hollywood Wonderland (1947)

=== Feature films ===
- Tanks a Million (1941, on-screen actor)
- Harmon of Michigan (1942, on-screen actor)
- A Yank on the Burma Road (1942, voice of radio announcer)
- Mr. Hex (1946, on-screen actor)
- Buck Privates Come Home (1947, narrator)
- The Prince of Peace (1949, narrator)
- Border Incident (1949, narrator)
- She Shoulda Said No! (1949, narrator)
- Destination Moon (1950, narrator)
