= Wings for This Man =

1945 propaganda film

- Produced by: First Motion Picture Unit, Army Air Forces
- Narrated by: Ronald Reagan
- Release date: 1945
- Running time: 10 minutes
- Country: United States
- Language: English

Wings for this Man is a propaganda film produced in 1945 by the U.S. Army Air Forces First Motion Picture Unit about the Tuskegee Airmen, the first unit of African-American pilots in the US military formed during World War II.

The film begins with dramatic footage of aerial combat over Italy, showing an outnumbered American squadron successfully dogfighting a Luftwaffe formation. When the pilots land they step out and are revealed to be black.

The picture then tells the story of the Tuskegee Airmen, starting with the Tuskegee Institute in Alabama and the founding of the airstrip near it. The narrator, future President Ronald Reagan, notes that the airmen had to overcome exceeding odds to get the unit created and notes that "there was misunderstanding, distrust and prejudice that had to be cleared away" before the unit could form. A rather standard training/combat/casualty sequence then follows, culminating in the third anniversary celebration of the unit followed by a parade.

== See also ==
- List of Allied propaganda films of World War II
