= Freakies =

Breakfast cereal made by Ralston

Freakies was a brand of sweetened breakfast cereal produced by Ralston and sold in the United States. The cereal – which consisted of crunchy, light brown, torus-shaped amalgam – was Ralston's first major venture into the sweetened ready-to-eat cereal market, and was marketed using a cast of seven creatures known collectively as "the Freakies".

== Marketing ==
The marketing thrust of Freakies was initially led by marketing manager Jay Brown, with marketing manager Jack Forcelledo following Brown and taking the Freakies into additional test markets and eventually national rollout. The creative for Freakies was developed by the Wells Rich Greene advertising agency in New York City. Jackie End was the lead creative and copywriter of the TV commercials as well as many of the back package panel storylines. The cereal entered the marketplace in 1972 and was discontinued in 1976. A chocolate version called "Cocoa Freakies" was available in 1973 and a fruit version titled "Fruity Freakies" was available in 1975-1976.

=== Characters ===
The Freakies were seven creatures, each with a different color and design. In addition to the personalities described on boxes and exhibited in all their television commercial spots, the 3rd spot, We Are the Freakies, had each character name and describe themselves in song.

Character	Color	Description.
BossMoss	dark green	Bossy, ineffectual, with a John Wayne voice.
Snorkledorf	blue	Confident, vain, plays his trunk like a horn.
Hamhose	light brown	Shy, childlike, prefers to eat alone.
Grumble	orange	Cranky, grumpy, sore feet, voiced like an old man.
Cowmumble	light green	Positive, demure, breathily soft-spoken.
Gargle	purple	Intelligent, snooty, know-it-all, British accent.
Goody Goody	pink	Pushy, bossy, kisses up to BossMoss.

Jackie End based most of the characters on people at the agency and on herself—although Goody Goody reminded End of a girl she knew in grade school—e.g., BossMoss was based on Creative Director Charlie Moss, whereas the demure Cowmumble, who had a crush on him, was based on End herself.

Wells Rich Greene president and chairman Mary Wells Lawrence expressed a desire to have a Freakie based on her, so Jackie End devised a glamorous, aristocratic pink character named ‘’Nifty Nifty’’, and suggested Ralston do a raspberry or strawberry cereal that the character could be the presenter for, but this did not come to pass.

=== TV commercials ===
The Freakies commercial spots were created at Zander's Animation Parlour. Animators included Bill Littlejohn and Preston Blair. The animation in the first seven spots was done using colored pencil on Color-aid paper with those renderings cut out and pasted to the celluloid sheets. The final three spots were created using the less labor-intensive traditional ink and paint animation process. The initial award-winning commercial was narrated by Burgess Meredith, and a short loop of his voice appeared at the end of the second spot.

Spot #	Year	Description
1	1974	Discovery of the Freakies Tree
2	1974	Personalities
3	1974	We Are the Freakies (song)
4	1974	Who Grew The Freakies Tree? (song)
5	1974	Monster
6	1975	Fruity Freakies "Fruit of the Spoon" (song)
7	1975	Cocoa Freakies
8	1975	Fruit On Your Head*
9	1975	The Freakiesburg Address (Bicentennial themed)*
10	1975	Boss Mossington (Bicentennial themed)*

*Traditional ink-and-paint animation

== Failed 1980s Relaunch ==
In 1986, a new Freakies cereal was made, depicting the characters as aliens from another planet. BossMoss and Grumble were effectively the same, but the other characters were simplified, renamed and redesigned: Hamhose became Hugger, Snorkeldorf became Tooter, Cowmumble became Sweetie, Goody-Goody became Hot Dog, and Gargle became Ace. The cereal itself was changed to shaped cereal pieces and marshmallows, so it was a revival of the original in name only. This product was short-lived and unsuccessful.

== Appearances in pop culture ==
They appear in Episode 40 of the satirical soap opera, "Mary Hartman, Mary Hartman" originally broadcast on Feb 27, 1976.

The 1989 film The 'Burbs features a scene where Ray Peterson, portrayed by Tom Hanks, is on his couch eating from a box of Freakies.

They appear in the 2007 film Flakes, when Neal Downs, portrayed by Aaron Stanford, receives a box of Freakies for his small New Orleans eatery, which serves a wide variety of cold cereal.

Freakies cereal appears in the 2017 film The Case For Christ.

Additionally, in a post-credits scene, Star-Lord is seen wearing a Freakies t-shirt in the 2023 film Guardians of the Galaxy Vol. 3.
