= Target Tokyo =

Target Tokyo "Special Film Project 153"
- Directed by: William Keighley
- Narrated by: Ronald Reagan
- Production company: First Motion Picture Unit
- Distributed by: U.S. Government
- Release date: 1945
- Language: English

Target Tokyo is a 22-minute film produced by the US Air Force and portraying the travels of an aircraft bomber and its crew from training in the U.S. and Saipan to the bombing of Tokyo. It was partially shot in Saipan, thus becoming the first example of a cinema of Northern Mariana Islands. Future U.S. president Ronald Reagan was the narrator. General Henry H. Arnold starred as himself.
