= The Rear Gunner =

- Title frame
- Directed by: Ray Enright
- Written by: Edwin Gilbert
- Produced by: Gordon Hollingshead
- Starring: Burgess Meredith; Ronald Reagan; Tom Neal
- Narrated by: Knox Manning
- Cinematography: Ted McCord; James Van Trees
- Edited by: Louis Hesse
- Music by: Howard Jackson
- Production company: The U.S. Army Signal Corps Photographic Section
- Distributed by: Warner Bros. Pictures
- Release date: April 10, 1943
- Running time: 26 minutes, 20 minutes (shortened) (USA)
- Country: United States
- Language: English

The Rear Gunner

The Rear Gunner is a 1943 American short instructional film, directed by Ray Enright and produced by Warner Bros. Pictures. Previously, Warner Bros. had produced three short documentary films, Winning Your Wings (1942) starring Jimmy Stewart, Men Of The Sky (1942) and Beyond the Line of Duty (1942).

Following the attack on Pearl Harbor, Hollywood rushed to turn out films to help win the war. The studios produced more than features, with countless cartoons and short subjects that were intended to inform the public, boost morale, encourage support of the Red Cross and other organizations that were helping at home and overseas or in recruitment. There were also films that were shown only to members of the armed forces. These films either trained them or entertained them. Rear Gunner is one of the best examples of how Hollywood pitched in and worked to boost morale and also recruit men into military service.

== Plot ==
L.A. "Pee Wee" Williams (Burgess Meredith), a young rural enlistee in the United States Army Air Corps (USAAC) is initially assigned to heavy bombers but is disappointed with his job as an air mechanic. Noticing that he has the ideal characteristics of small stature and determination, pilot Lt. Ames (Ronald Reagan) asks if he is interested in being an air gunner. Pee Wee describes his experience in shooting black crows back home in Kansas.

Following up, Ames sends Pee Wee to a skeet range, where he scores a perfect six out of six hits. The next step is to send the young recruit to an Army Air Forces Gunnery School. He joins hundreds of other students, including Benny (Dane Clark), a recruit whose sole experience with guns is in winning Kewpie dolls at an arcade. At the gunnery school, Pee Wee begins a five-week course and 200 hours of technical instruction and practical training. Soon the trainees move from classroom to skeet ranges, BB guns and gun truck platforms with machine guns mounted on the beds of pickup trucks, firing at clay targets. The last training sessions had trainees firing from the gunner's stations in North American T-6 Texan training aircraft.

Throughout the training, his great marksmanship skills make Pee Wee stand out. When he graduates, his first assignment is as a tail gunner in a four-engine Consolidated B-24 Liberator bomber. Reuniting with Lt. Ames, Pee Wee and the crew are sent to the South Pacific. On his first mission, he shoots down a Japanese Zero. Later on a July 15, 1942 bombing mission, his bomber is able successfully to attack an enemy aircraft carrier but is intercepted on the return flight by five enemy fighters. With two engines disabled, Lt. Ames relies on his gunners to keep the enemy at bay, and they shoot down four of the attackers. When Ames is forced to land his damaged bomber, the lone remaining Japanese fighter strafes the crew huddling on the ground until Pee Wee climbs back into the bomber and shoots down the fighter. For his heroism, rear gunner Williams is awarded the Distinguished Service Medal.

== Cast ==
- Burgess Meredith as Pvt. L.A. "Pee Wee" Williams (credited as Lieutenant Burgess Meredith)
- Ronald Reagan as Lt. Ames (credited as Lieutenant Ronald Reagan)
- Tom Neal as Instructor Sergeant
- Jonathan Hale as Commanding Officer
- Dane Clark as Benny (credited as Bernard Zanville)
- Frank Coghlan Jr. as Gunnery Student / Messenger (uncredited)
- Hank Mann as Carnival Booth Man (uncredited)
- Jack Mower as Recruiting Officer (uncredited)
- Richard Quine as Pilot with Sun Glasses (uncredited)
- Franklin Delano Roosevelt as President Roosevelt (archive footage) (uncredited)

== Production ==
The Rear Gunner was produced with the full cooperation of the USAAC. The film begins with the strains of the fourth verse of the "Air Corps Song":

Off we go into the wild sky yonder, Keep the wings level and true;
If you'd live to be a gray haired wonder, keep the nose out of the blue.
Flying men, guarding the nation's borders, we'll be there followed by more!
In echelon, we carry on, for nothing can stop the Army Air Corps! (Note: The "Air Corps Song" later re-worded and renamed the "Air Force Song" was introduced in 1938.)

The bomber aircraft featured in The Rear Gunner is a B-24 Liberator although Boeing B-17 Flying Fortress bombers are also seen. Other aircraft that are in the film include the Douglas B-18 Bolo, Martin B-10, Lockheed Hudson and North American T-6.

== Reception and legacy ==
The Rear Gunner was typical of the propaganda and training films of the period produced under the auspices of the Office of War Information. The film was distributed and exhibited by Warner Bros. under the auspices of the Motion Picture Committee Cooperating for National Defense. The Rear Gunner was the fourth wartime film short produced by Warner Brothers Studios and proved popular with audiences. The film was preserved by the Academy Film Archive in 2013.

It was on a list of twenty-one films announced as Academy Award nominees for Short Subject Documentary but the Documentary Award Committee subsequently narrowed the field to seven titles and The Rear Gunner was not included on the final ballot.
