= Recognition of the Japanese Zero Fighter =

- Directed by: Bernard Vorhaus
- Produced by: United States Army Air Forces
- Starring: Ronald Reagan
- Narrated by: Art Gilmore
- Distributed by: Office of War Information
- Release date: 2 February 1943
- Running time: 20 minutes
- Country: United States
- Language: English

Recognition of the Japanese Zero Fighter (also known as Jap Zero) is a 1943 educational dramatic short produced by the United States Army Air Forces during World War II. The film's purpose was to instruct pilots in the Pacific theater about recognizing hostile planes at long distances and avoid "friendly fire" incidents.

== Plot ==
Most of the film is taken up with a short play in which a young pilot, portrayed by Ronald Reagan, is ordered on reconnaissance missions of the Pacific. He encounters another plane and cannot tell if it is friendly or not. This plot is interspersed with animated segments illustrating the physical characteristics of the Japanese Zero and how it can be distinguished from an American plane.

== Influence ==
Scenes from Jap Zero appear in If You Love This Planet, a 1982 documentary short about the dangers of nuclear weapons.
