= The Fight for the Sky =

- Produced by: Office of War Information
- Starring: Jimmy Doolittle
- Narrated by: Ronald Reagan, Reed Hadley
- Release date: June 21, 1945
- Running time: 20 minutes (theatrical release) 41 minutes (original)
- Country: United States
- Language: English

The Fight for the Sky is a short propaganda film commissioned by the US government to highlight the victories of the Allied air forces over Europe prior to the Normandy invasion.

Opening with shots of aerial combat over Europe the film turns to footage of the airmen acting casually in their base in East Anglia, reading newspapers, playing ping pong, and listening to the radio. However, they are soon called for a debriefing about their next mission, a strike deep into Germany's industrial region, the Ruhr. They ready their planes and arrive over their targets like clockwork, shooting down some German Luftwaffe planes in the process. None of the missions have failed due to enemy resistance alone, the narrator informs the audience, though some have not succeeded because of weather conditions. Captured German footage is shown to prove that the enemy was just as determined to stop the attacks as the Allies were to carry them out.

In February 1944 a new bombing initiative is begun. Instead of waiting to be attacked by the Germans the Americans will seek them out, targeting German airfields. Then the focus turns to enemy transportation, and the Allies make it impossible for a railroad to operate at day, also targeting trucks, barges, and even flak towers. All this made the eventual landings at Normandy and the opening of the second western front possible. With victory won in Europe, it must now be won in the Pacific.

Two versions of the film were released. A short version, narrated by Ronald Reagan, was released to theatres with a running time of approximately 20 minutes. The complete version, with narration by Reed Hadley, runs 41 minutes.

== See also ==
- List of Allied propaganda films of World War II
