= Burgess Meredith =

American actor (1906–1997)

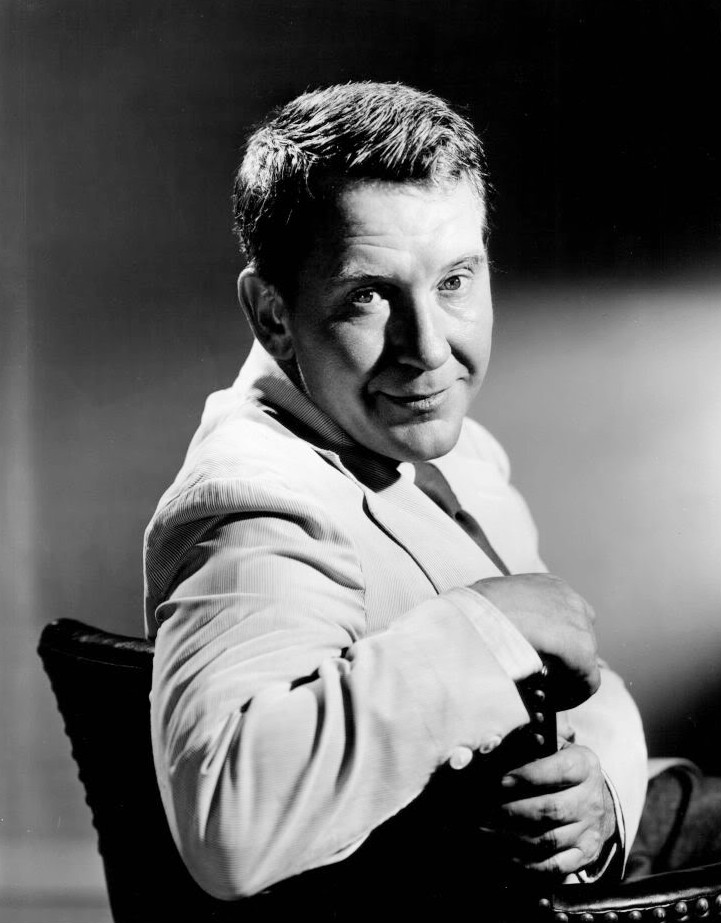
- Meredith in a publicity photo (1954)
- Born: Oliver Burgess Meredith; November 16, 1907; Cleveland, Ohio, U.S.
- Died: September 9, 1997 (aged 89); Malibu, California, U.S.
- Education: Amherst College
- Occupations: Actor; filmmaker
- Years active: 1929–1997
- Political party: Democratic
- Spouses: Helen Derby (m. 1933; div. 1935); Margaret Perry (m. 1936; div. 1938); Paulette Goddard (m. 1944; div. 1949); Kaja Sundsten (m. 1951)
- Children: 2
- Military career
- Allegiance: United States
- Branch: United States Army Air Forces
- Service years: 1942–1945
- Rank: Captain
- Units: First Air Force; Office of War Information
- Conflicts: World War II
- Awards: American Campaign Medal; World War II Victory Medal

Acting President of the Actors' Equity Association
- In office 1937–1938
- Preceded by: Frank Gillmore
- Succeeded by: Arthur Byron

Oliver Burgess Meredith (November 16, 1907 – September 9, 1997) was an American actor and filmmaker whose career encompassed radio, theater, film, and television.

Active for more than six decades, Meredith has been called "a virtuosic actor" and "one of the most accomplished actors of the [20th] century". A lifetime member of the Actors Studio, he won a Primetime Emmy Award, was the first male actor to win the Saturn Award for Best Supporting Actor twice, and was nominated for two Academy Awards.

Meredith established himself as a leading man in Hollywood with critically acclaimed performances as Mio Romagna in Winterset (1936), George Milton in Of Mice and Men (1939), and Ernie Pyle in The Story of G.I. Joe (1945).

Meredith was known later in his career for his appearances on The Twilight Zone and for portraying The Penguin in the 1960s TV series Batman and boxing trainer Mickey Goldmill in the Rocky film series. For his performances in The Day of the Locust (1975) and Rocky (1976), he received nominations for the Academy Award for Best Supporting Actor. He later appeared in the comedy Foul Play (1978) and the fantasy film Clash of the Titans (1981). Meredith also narrated numerous films and documentaries during his long career.

"Although those performances renewed his popularity," observed Mel Gussow in The New York Times (referring to the Penguin and Mickey Goldmill roles), "they represented only a small part of a richly varied career in which he played many of the more demanding roles in classical and contemporary theater—in plays by Shakespeare, O'Neill, Beckett and others."

== Early life ==
Meredith was born in 1907 in Cleveland, Ohio, the son of Ida Beth (née Burgess; 1861–1933) and William George Meredith (1861–1938), a Canadian-born physician of English descent. His mother came from a long line of Methodist revivalists, a religion to which he adhered throughout his lifetime.

Known informally to his friends as "Buzz", Burgess Meredith graduated from Hoosac School in 1926 and then attended Amherst College (class of 1931). He left Amherst and became a reporter for the Stamford Advocate.

== Career ==
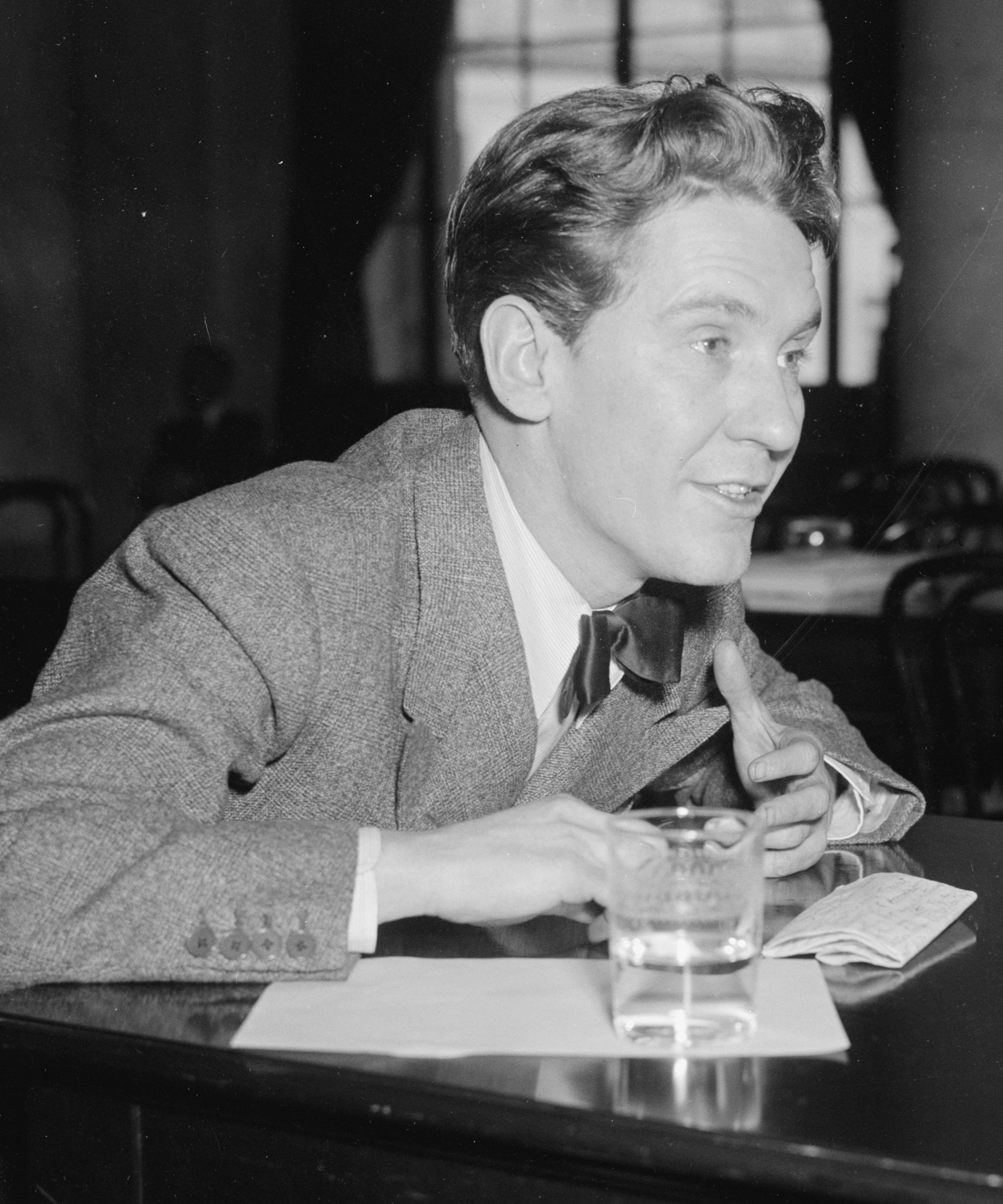
Meredith in 1938

=== Theater ===
In The Remarkable Mr. Pennypacker (1953)

In 1929, he became a member of Eva Le Gallienne's Civic Repertory Theatre company in New York City.Although best known to the larger world audience for his film and television work, Meredith was an influential actor and director for the stage. He made his Broadway debut as Peter in Le Gallienne's production of Romeo and Juliet (1930) and became a star in Maxwell Anderson's Winterset (1935), which became his film debut the following year. His early life and theater work were the subject of a New Yorker profile. In 1935, he starred along with Hugh Williams at the Martin Beck Theatre in John Van Druten's Flowers of the Forest.

Meredith's performance in the 1935 Broadway revival of The Barretts of Wimpole Street starring Katharine Cornell generated enthusiastic positive reviews from a number of critics. Cornell subsequently cast him in several of her later productions. Some of Meredith's other Broadway roles included Van van Dorn in High Tor (1937), Liliom in Liliom (1940), Christy Mahon in The Playboy of the Western World (1946), and Adolphus Cusins in Major Barbara (1956). He created the role of Erie Smith in the English-language premiere of Eugene O'Neill's Hughie at the Theatre Royal in Bath, England in 1963. He played Hamlet in avant garde theatrical and radio productions of the play.

A distinguished theater director, Meredith earned a Tony Award nomination for his 1974 Broadway staging of Ulysses in Nighttown, a theatrical adaptation of the "Nighttown" section of James Joyce's Ulysses. Meredith also shared a Special Tony Award with James Thurber for their collaboration on A Thurber Carnival (1960). In the late 1970s, he directed Fionnula Flanagan's one-woman multi-role play James Joyce's Women, which toured for several years.

=== Film ===
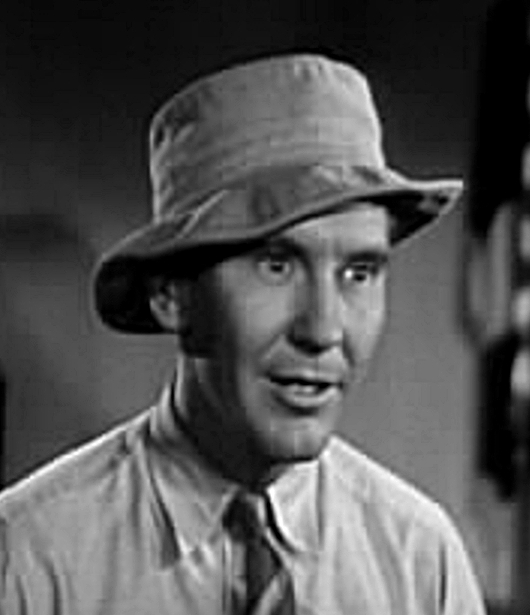
Meredith in Second Chorus

Burgess Meredith is The Rear Gunner (1943).

Burgess Meredith's stage performances attracted the attention of several Hollywood film producers. Unlike most other movie actors, Meredith never signed a long-term contract with a single studio, preferring to work on individual film projects. Also, unlike some other former stage actors, Meredith successfully adjusted his performances to the film medium. Instead of playing to the audience in the balcony, Meredith now played to the camera, with his performances more controlled and intimate. This gave his screen characters great sensitivity, as he demonstrated in three bravura performances: as Mio Romagna in Winterset (1936), as George Milton in Of Mice and Men (1939), and as Ernie Pyle in The Story of G.I. Joe (1945). He starred only occasionally in pictures, as in San Francisco Docks (1940, as a longshoreman accused of murder) and Street of Chance (1942, as an amnesiac who may have been a killer). Meredith was featured in many 1940s films, including three co-starring his then-wife Paulette Goddard: Second Chorus (1940), Diary of a Chambermaid (1946), and On Our Merry Way (1948).

In 1950, Meredith was among the 151 entertainment professionals and journalists accused of communist sympathies in Red Channels. As evidence, the anti-communist pamphlet cited Meredith's support for Spanish pro-democracy groups and a humanitarian relief effort in Yugoslavia, as well as his participation in anti-censorship protests against the House Committee on Un-American Activities. Meredith was subsequently placed on the Hollywood blacklist and was largely absent from film for the next decade, though he remained involved in stage plays and radio during this time.

Meredith was a favorite of director Otto Preminger, who cast him in Advise and Consent (1962), The Cardinal (1963), In Harm's Way (1965), Hurry Sundown (1967), Skidoo (1968), and Such Good Friends (1971). He was in Madame X (with Lana Turner, 1966) and Stay Away Joe (1968), appearing as the father of Elvis Presley's character. He was acclaimed by critics for his performance as Harry Greener in The Day of the Locust (1975) and received nominations for the BAFTA, Golden Globe, and Academy Award for best supporting actor. Meredith then played Rocky Balboa's trainer Mickey Goldmill in the first three Rocky films (1976, 1979, and 1982). Though his character died in the third Rocky film, Meredith returned briefly in a flashback in the fifth film, Rocky V (1990). His portrayal in the first film earned him his second consecutive nomination for the Academy Award for Best Supporting Actor.

Meredith had a role in Foul Play (1978) with Chevy Chase and Goldie Hawn. He played an old Korean War veteran Captain J. G. Williams in The Last Chase (1981) with Lee Majors. He appeared in Ray Harryhausen's last stop-motion feature Clash of the Titans (also 1981) in a supporting role. Meredith appeared in Santa Claus: The Movie (1985) and was the voice of Golobulus in G.I. Joe: The Movie (1987). In his last years, he played Jack Lemmon's character's sex-crazed 95-year-old father in Grumpy Old Men (1993) and its sequel, Grumpier Old Men (1995).

Meredith directed the movie The Man on the Eiffel Tower (1949) starring Charles Laughton, which was produced by Irving Allen. Meredith also was billed in a supporting role in this film. In 1970, he directed, co-wrote, and played a supporting role in) The Yin and the Yang of Mr. Go, an espionage caper starring James Mason and Jeff Bridges.

=== Television ===
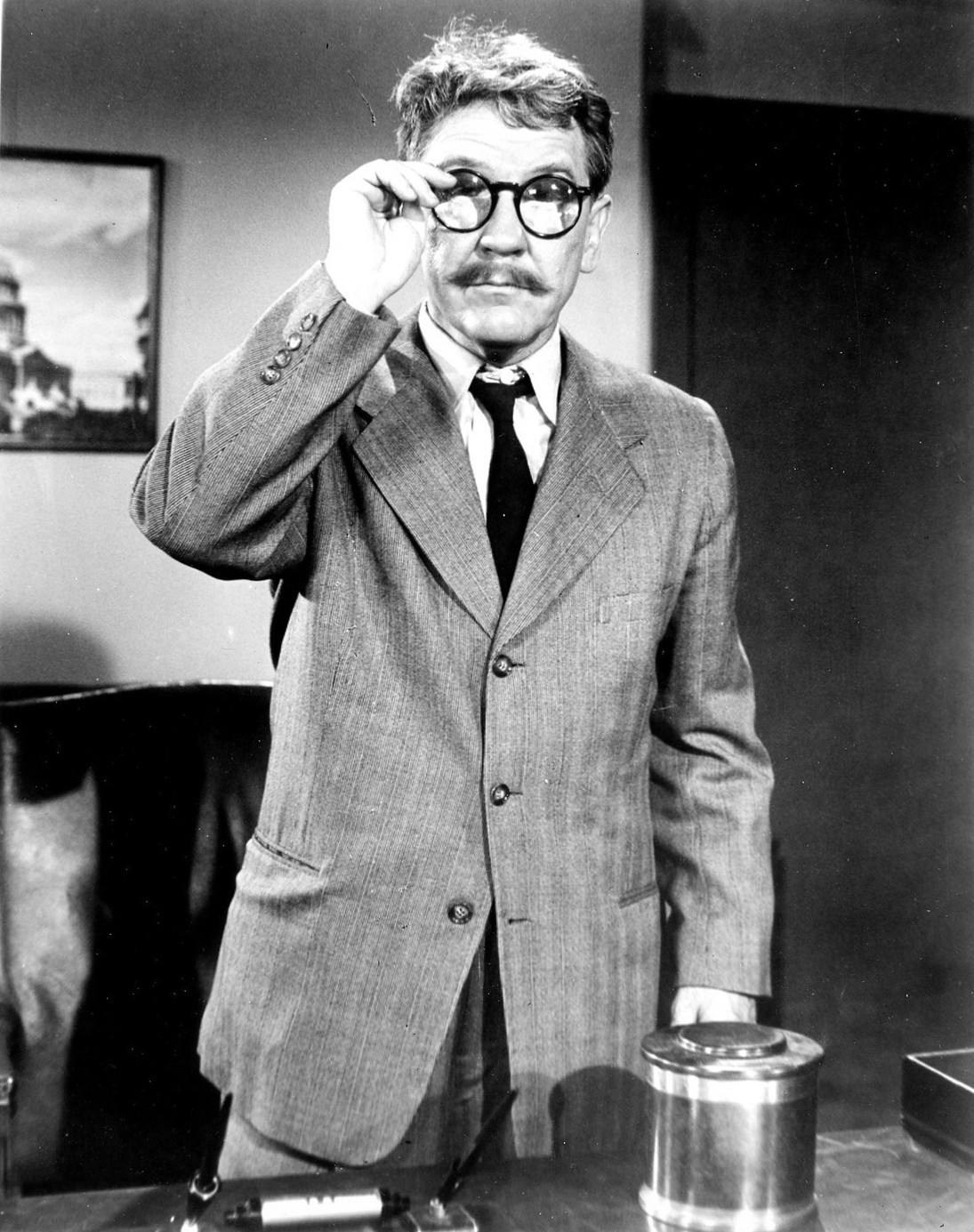
Meredith as Henry Bemis in The Twilight Zone episode "Time Enough at Last"

Meredith appeared in four episodes of the anthology TV series The Twilight Zone, tying him with Jack Klugman for the most appearances on the show in a starring role.

In his first appearance in 1959 in "Time Enough at Last", Meredith portrayed a henpecked bookworm who finds himself the sole survivor of an unspecified apocalypse that leads him to contemplate suicide until he discovers the ruins of the library. In 1961's "Mr. Dingle, the Strong", Meredith played the title character, a timid weakling who receives superhuman strength from an extraterrestrial experiment in human nature. Also that year in "The Obsolete Man", Meredith portrayed a librarian sentenced to death in a dystopic totalitarian society. Lastly, in 1963's "Printer's Devil", Meredith portrayed the Devil himself. Meredith later played two additional roles in Rod Serling's other anthology series, Night Gallery. Meredith was the narrator for Twilight Zone: The Movie in 1983.

Meredith also appeared in various western series, such as Rawhide (four times), The Virginian (twice), Wagon Train, Branded, The Wild Wild West, The Travels of Jaimie McPheeters, Laredo, Bonanza, and Daniel Boone. In 1963, he appeared as Vincent Marion in a five-part episode of the last season of the Warner Bros. ABC detective series 77 Sunset Strip. He appeared three times in Burke's Law (1963–1964), starring Gene Barry.

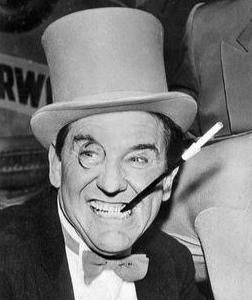
Meredith as the Penguin on the 1960s TV show Batman

Meredith was also well known for his portrayal of the Penguin in the television series Batman from 1966 to 1968 and in the 1966 film based on the TV series. His role as the Penguin was so well-received that the show's writers always had a script featuring the Penguin ready whenever Meredith was available. Meredith made 21 appearances on the series as the Penguin. He also made a brief cameo appearance as the Penguin in the 1968 episode of The Monkees titled "Monkees Blow Their Minds".

From 1972 to 1973, Meredith played V. C. R. Cameron, director of Probe Control, in the television movie/pilot Probe and then in Search, the subsequent TV series (the name was changed to avoid conflict with a program on PBS).

Meredith won an Emmy Award as Outstanding Supporting Actor in a Comedy or Drama Special for portraying crusading lawyer Joseph Welch in the 1977 television film Tail Gunner Joe, a fictionalized study of the career of U.S. Senator Joseph McCarthy, the controversial anticommunist politician active in the 1950s.

In 1992, Meredith narrated The Chaplin Puzzle, a television documentary that provides a rare insight into Charles Chaplin's work circa 1914 at Keystone Studios and Essanay, where Chaplin developed his Tramp character. Coincidentally, Meredith married actress Paulette Goddard in 1944 following her divorce from Chaplin.

== Military service ==
In 1942, Meredith enlisted in the United States Army Air Forces during World War II, reaching the rank of captain. After transferring to the Office of War Information, he made training and education films for the U.S. armed forces. In 1943 he performed in the USAAF's recruiting short The Rear Gunner and the U.S. Army training film A Welcome to Britain for troops heading to the UK in preparation for the liberation of Europe. He was released from duty in 1944 to work on the movie The Story of G.I. Joe, in which he played the war correspondent Ernie Pyle. He was discharged from the USAAF in 1945.

== Other work ==
Meredith also performed voice-over work. He provided the narration for the war film A Walk in the Sun (1945). As a nod to his longtime association with the original Twilight Zone series, he served as narrator for the 1983 film based on the series. He was a TV commercial voice for such clients as Bulova, Honda, Pioneer, Stokely-Van Camp, United Airlines, and Freakies breakfast cereal. He also produced and narrated Works Of Calder, a 1950 film directed by Herbert Matter with a soundtrack by the composer John Cage.

He supplied the narration for the 1974–75 ABC Saturday morning series Korg: 70,000 B.C. and was the voice of Puff in the series of animated adaptations of the Peter, Paul, and Mary song Puff, the Magic Dragon. In the mid-1950s, he was one of four narrators of the NBC and syndicated public affairs program, The Big Story (1949–58), which focused on courageous journalists. In 1991, he narrated a track on The Chieftains' album of traditional Christmas music and carols, The Bells of Dublin.

Meredith supplied vocals and a poem to Jeff Bridges' album Slow Magic: 1977-1978 released posthumously in April 2025.

He acted in the Kenny G music video of "Have Yourself a Merry Little Christmas", which was released in 1994. He played the main character, a projectionist at a movie theater. In 1994, he published his autobiography, So Far, So Good.

His last role before his death was the portrayal of both the Hamilton Wofford and Covington Wofford characters in the 1996 video game Ripper by Take-Two Interactive. Meredith was considered to play the Penguin's father in the 1992 Tim Burton film Batman Returns, but illness prevented him from appearing and the role was taken by Paul Reubens.

== Personal life and death ==
Meredith was married four times. His first wife, Helen Derby Berrien Meredith—the daughter of American Cyanamid president Harry L. Derby—died by suicide in 1940, nearly five years after their divorce. His next two wives, Margaret Perry and Paulette Goddard, were actresses; Goddard suffered a miscarriage in 1944. Meredith's last marriage, to Kaja Sundsten, lasted 46 years and produced two children.

Meredith was a lifelong Democrat and donor to the party. He wrote in his 1994 autobiography So Far, So Good that he had violent mood swings caused by cyclothymia, a form of bipolar disorder.

In 1937, Meredith moved to Rockland County, New York, where he bought land named High Tor Ranch. He sponsored popular horse shows, the funds from the first of which were used as seed money to pay for legal fees to incorporate the area into the village of Pomona. His shows were popular, and he would entertain guests dressed in his Penguin costume and invite fellow actors and celebrities to join him.

On September 9, 1997, Meredith died at the age of 89 from complications of Alzheimer's disease and melanoma in his home in Malibu, California. He was cremated.

== Awards and nominations ==
Year	Award	Category	Nominated work	Result	Ref.
1975	Academy Awards	Best Supporting Actor	The Day of the Locust	Nominated	
1976	Academy Awards	Best Supporting Actor	Rocky	Nominated	
1975	British Academy Film Awards	Best Actor in a Supporting Role	The Day of the Locust	Nominated	
1985	CableACE Awards	Best Actor in a Theatrical or Dramatic Special	Answers	Nominated	
1975	Golden Globe Awards	Best Supporting Actor – Motion Picture	The Day of the Locust	Nominated	
1962	National Board of Review Awards	Best Supporting Actor	Advise & Consent	Won	
1977	Primetime Emmy Awards	Outstanding Performance by a Supporting Actor in a Comedy or Drama Special	Tail Gunner Joe	Won	
1978	Primetime Emmy Awards	Outstanding Performance by a Supporting Actor in a Comedy or Drama Special	The Last Hurrah	Nominated	
1977	Saturn Awards	Best Supporting Actor	The Sentinel	Nominated	
1978	Saturn Awards	Best Supporting Actor	Magic	Won	
1981	Saturn Awards	Best Supporting Actor	Clash of the Titans	Won	
1977	Sitges Film Festival	Best Actor	Burnt Offerings	Won	
1960	Tony Awards	Special Tony Award	A Thurber Carnival	Won	
1974	Tony Awards	Best Direction of a Play	Ulysses in Nighttown	Nominated	

=== Honors ===
- For his contributions to the motion picture industry, Meredith has a star on the Hollywood Walk of Fame.
- For his onstage contributions, he was inducted into the American Theater Hall of Fame.
- A 21-acre (8.5 ha) park was named after him in Pomona, New York, and he provided the funding to incorporate the village.
- In 1977, he received an honorary doctorate degree from Upper Iowa University in Fayette, Iowa.

== Filmography ==
=== Film ===
Year	Title	Role	Notes
1935	The Scoundrel	Flop House Bum	Uncredited
1936	Winterset	Mio Romagna	
1937	There Goes the Groom	Dick Matthews	
1938	Spring Madness	The Lippencott	
1939	Idiot's Delight	Quillery	
1939	Of Mice and Men	George Milton	
1940	Castle on the Hudson	Steven Rockford	
1940	Second Chorus	Hank Taylor	
1940	The San Francisco Docks	Johnny Barnes	
1941	That Uncertain Feeling	Alexander Sebastian	
1941	Tom, Dick and Harry	Harry	
1941	The Forgotten Village	Narrator	Voice
1942	Street of Chance	Frank Thompson / Danny Nearing	
1943	A Welcome to Britain	Himself	Army Service Forces training film, 1943; uncredited
1943	The Rear Gunner	Pvt. L.A. Pee Wee Williams	
1944	Our Country	Himself	
1944	Hymn of the Nations	Narrator	Voice, uncredited
1944	Salute to France	the American soldier	
1944	Tunisian Victory	American soldier	Voice
1944	Attack! Battle of New Britain	Narrator	Voice
1945	The Story of G.I. Joe	Ernie Pyle	
1945	A Walk in the Sun	Narrator	Voice, uncredited
1946	The Diary of a Chambermaid	Captain Mauger	
1946	Magnificent Doll	James Madison	
1947	Mine Own Executioner	Felix Milne	
1948	On Our Merry Way	Oliver M Pease	
1949	Jigsaw	Jack / Bartender	Uncredited
1949	A Yank Comes Back	Unknown role	Also writer
1949	Golden Arrow	Dick	
1949	The Man on the Eiffel Tower	Joseph Heurtin	Also director
1950	Works of Calder	Narrator	Voice
1954	Screen Snapshots: Hollywood's Invisible Man	Himself	
1957	Joe Butterfly	Joe Butterfly	
1957	Albert Schweitzer	Narrator	Voice
1958	The Kidnappers	Louis Halliburton	
1958	Sorcerer's Village	Narrator	Voice
1959	America Pauses for Springtime	Himself	
1959	America Pauses for the Merry Month of May	Himself	
1962	Advise and Consent	Herbert Gelman	
1963	The Cardinal	Father Ned Halley	
1965	In Harm's Way	Commander Egan Powell	
1966	Madame X	Dan Sullivan	
1966	Batman	Oswald Cobblepot / The Penguin	
1966	The Crazy Quilt	Narrator	Voice
1966	A Big Hand for the Little Lady	Doc Scully	As Burgess Meridith
1967	Torture Garden	Dr. Diablo	
1967	Hurry Sundown	Judge Purcell	Framework Story
1968	Stay Away, Joe	Charlie Lightcloud	
1968	Skidoo	The Warden	
1968	Dear Mr. Gable	Narrator	Voice
1968	Debrief: Apollo 8	Narrator	Voice
1969	The Father	Captain Ned	
1969	Mackenna's Gold	The Store Keeper	
1969	Hard Contract	Ramsey Williams	
1969	The Reivers	Lucius / Narrator	Voice
1970	There Was a Crooked Man...	The Missouri Kid	
1970	The Yin and the Yang of Mr. Go	The Dolphin	Also director
1971	Clay Pigeon	Freedom Lovelace	
1971	Such Good Friends	Kalman	
1972	A Fan's Notes	Mr. Blue	
1972	Beware! The Blob	Old Hobo	Uncredited
1972	Mineral King	Narrator	Voice
1972	The Man	Senator Watson	
1974	Hay que matar a B.	Hector	
1974	Golden Needles	Winters	
1975	The Day of the Locust	Harry Greener	
1975	92 in the Shade	Goldsboro	
1975	The Master Gunfighter	Narrator	Voice
1975	The Hindenburg	Emilio Pajetta	
1976	Circasia	Clown	
1976	Burnt Offerings	Arnold Allardyce	
1976	Rocky	Mickey Goldmill	
1977	The Sentinel	Charles Chazen	
1977	Golden Rendezvous	Van Heurden	
1978	The Manitou	Dr. Snow	
1978	Foul Play	Mr. Hennessey	
1978	The Great Bank Hoax	Jack Stutz	
1978	Magic	Ben Greene	
1979	Rocky II	Mickey Goldmill	
1980	When Time Ran Out	Rene Valdez	
1980	Final Assignment	Zak	
1981	The Last Chase	Captain J.G. Williams	
1981	Clash of the Titans	Ammon	
1981	True Confessions	Msgr. Seamus Fargo	
1982	Rocky III	Mickey Goldmill	
1983	Twilight Zone: The Movie	Narrator	Voice, uncredited
1984	Wet Gold	Sampson	Made for TV
1985	Santa Claus: The Movie	Ancient Elf	
1985	Rocky IV	Mickey Goldmill	Archival footage, uncredited
1987	G.I. Joe: The Movie	Golobulus	Voice
1987	King Lear	Don Learo	Uncredited
1988	Hot to Trot	Don's Dad	Voice, uncredited
1988	Full Moon in Blue Water	The General	
1990	Oddball Hall	Ingersol	
1990	State of Grace	Finn	
1990	Rocky V	Mickey Goldmill	Flashback (new footage)
1993	Grumpy Old Men	Grandpa Gustafson	
1994	Camp Nowhere	Fein	
1995	Tall Tale	Old Man	Uncredited
1995	Across the Moon	Barney	
1995	Grumpier Old Men	Grandpa Gustafson	Last role
2006	Rocky Balboa	Mickey Goldmill	Archival footage, uncredited
2020	40 Years of Rocky: The Birth of a Classic	Mickey Goldmill	Archival footage

=== Television ===
Year	Title	Role	Notes
1950	Texaco Star Theatre	Himself	1 episode
1950	Perry Como's Kraft Music Hall	Himself	1 episode
1950	Your Show of Shows	Himself	2 episodes
1950	Robert Montgomery Presents	Himself/Frank Hugo	Episode: "Ride the Pink Horse"
1950-1951	Lights Out	Various Roles	3 episodes
1952	The Name's the Same	Himself	1 episode
1952	Tales of Tomorrow	Paul	Episode: "The Great Silence"
1953–1954	Excursion	Himself	3 episodes
1956	What's My Line	Himself	1 episode
1955–1958	The Big Story	Narrator (voice)	38 episodes
1958	The Ben Hecht Show	Himself	1 episode
1959	The Jack Paar Tonight Show	Himself	1 episode
1959	The Arthur Murray Party	Himself	2 episodes
1959–1963	The Twilight Zone	Henry Bemis, Luther Dingle, Romney Wordsworth, Mr. Smith	4 episodes
1961	The Play of the Week	Vladimir	Episode: "Waiting for Godot"
1961–1964	Rawhide	Tom Gwynn, Matthew Higgens, Hannibal H. Plew	4 Episodes
1962	Naked City	Duncan Kleist	Episode: "Hold for Gloria Christmas"
1964	Wagon Train	Grover Allen	Episode: "The Grover Allen Story"
1965	Mr. Novak	Principal Martin Woodridge	15 episodes
1965	Laredo	Grubby Sully	Episode: "Lazyfoot, Where Are You?"
1965	The Loner	Siedry	Episode: "Hunt the Man Down"
1965	The Wild Wild West	Orkney Cadwallader	Episode: "The Night of the Human Trigger"
1965	The Trials of O'Brien	Judge Benjamin Vincent	Episode: "No Justice for the Judge"
1966–1968	Batman	The Penguin	21 episodes
1966	Twelve O'Clock High	Radar Expert	Episode: "Back to the Drawing Board"
1967	The Invaders	Theodore Booth	Episode: "Wall of Crystal"
1968–1971	Ironside	Harry Grenadine, Alfred Carney	2 episodes
1967	Bonanza	Owney Duggan	Episode: "Six Black Horses"
1968	The Monkees	The Penguin	Uncredited; Episode: "Monkees Blow Their Minds"
1968	The Virginian	Tim Bradbury	2 episodes
1969	Daniel Boone	Alex Hemming	Episode: "Three Score and Ten"
1970–1972	Night Gallery	Charlie Finnegan, Dr. William Fall	2 episodes
1971	The Virginian	Muley	Episode: "Flight From Memory"
1971	The Bill Cosby Special	Himself	Television special
1971	The Bold Ones: The Senator	George P. Mallon	Episode: "Power Play"
1971	Room 222	Morris Henry	Episode: "KWWH"
1971	The Strange Monster of Strawberry Cove	Henry Meade	2 part television film
1972	Mannix	Noah Otway	Episode: "The Crimson Halo"
1972	McCloud	Marvin Sloan	Episode: "A Little Plot at Tranquil Valley"
1972–1973	Search	V. C. R. Cameron	23 episodes
1974–1975	Korg: 70,000 B.C.	Narrator (voice)	19 episodes
1975	The Time Of Apollo	Narrator (voice)	Documentary by NASA
1976	Dinah!	Himself	1 episode
1976	The 48th Annual Academy Awards	Himself	
1977	SST: Death Flight	Willy Basset	Television film
1977	Tail Gunner Joe	Joseph N. Welch	Television film
1977	The 49th Annual Academy Awards	Himself	
1978	The Return of Captain Nemo	Prof. Waldo Cunningham	Television film
1978	The Living Sands of Namib	Narrator (voice)	National Geographic Special
1978–1979, 1982	Puff the Magic Dragon	Puff (voice)	Television special
1980–1981	Those Amazing Animals	Himself/co-host	2 episodes
1982–1983	Gloria	Dr. Adams, Gloria Bunker Stivic's boss	22 episodes
1984	Faerie Tale Theatre	Mr. Mortimer Mole (voice)	Episode: "Thumbelina"
1987	Mister Corbett's Ghost	Mad Tom	Television film
1991	Night of the Hunter	Birdy	Television film
1992	Lincoln	Winfield Scott (voice)	Television film
1993	In the Heat of the Night	Judge Cully	3 episodes
1994	The Great Battles of the Civil War	Gettysburg Star, Banner Columnist (voice)	Television series documentary

=== Video games ===
Year	Title	Role	Notes
1996	Ripper	Hamilton Wofford, Covington Wofford	

== Theatre ==
Year	Film	Role	Notes
1930	Romeo and Juliet	Peter	
1930	The Green Cockatoo	Grain	
1930	Siegfried	Olderly	
1931	People on the Hill	Packy Davis	
1932	Liliom	Young Hollunder	
1932	Alice in Wonderland	Duck, Dormouse, Tweedledee	
1933	The Threepenny Opera	Cook-Finger Jack	
1933	Little Ol' Boy	Red Barry	
1933	She Loves Me Not	Buzz Jones	
1934	Hipper's Holiday	Jim Hipper	
1935	Battieship Gertie	Seaman Jones	
1935	The Barretts of Wimpole Street	Octavius Moulton-Barrett	
1935	Flowers of the Forest	Leonard Dobie	
1935	Winterset	Milo	
1936	High Tor	Van Van Dorn	
1937	The Star-Wagon	Stephen Minch	
1940	Liliom	Liliom	
1946	The Playboy of the Western World	Christy Mahon	
1950	Happy as Larry	Larry	
1951	The Little Blue Light	Gandersheim	
1951	The Fourposter	Michael	
1953	The Teahouse of the August Moon	Sakini	
1953	The Remarkable Mr. Pennypacker	Pa Pennypacker	
1956	Major Barbra	Adolphus Cusins	
1960	A Thurber Carnival	Director	
1961	Kicks and Co.	Mr. Kicks	
1964	I Was Dancing	Performer	
1967	Of Love Remembered	Performer	
1974	Ulysses in Nighttown	Director	

== Radio appearances ==
Program	Episode	Date	Notes
Philip Morris Playhouse	Night Must Fall	October 24, 1941	Maureen O'Sullivan co-starred.
Philip Morris Playhouse	My Favorite Wife	October 31, 1941	Madeleine Carroll co-starred
Philip Morris Playhouse	You Only Live Once	November 28, 1941	
Cavalcade of America	Rain Fakers	December 30, 1946	
Theatre Guild on the Air	The Sea Wolf	April 27, 1952	
Theatre Guild on the Air	Black Chiffon	May 10, 1953	

== Book ==
- So Far, So Good: A Memoir. Little Brown & Co. 1994. ISBN 978-0-31-656717-6.
