= Winning Your Wings =

1942 film by John Huston

- Directed by: John Huston; Owen Crump (uncredited)
- Written by: Owen Crump
- Starring: James Stewart
- Narrated by: James Stewart
- Music by: Alfred Newman
- Distributed by: War Activities Committee of the Motion Picture Industry
- Release date: May 28, 1942
- Running time: 18 minutes
- Country: United States
- Language: English

Winning Your Wings is a 1942 Allied propaganda film of World War II produced by Warner Bros. Studios for the US Army Air Forces, starring James Stewart. It was aimed at young men who were thinking about joining the Air Force. Members of the production crew would later form the core of the First Motion Picture Unit.

After a BT trainer lands on a tarmac, a pilot in full flight gear gets out and walks toward the camera. Once he comes near enough to be recognized as Stewart, he begins his narration: "I want to talk to you all today about one of my favorite subjects, the Army Air Forces." "First, are there any questions?" Then begins a series of vignettes in which young men in different social positions ask about being in the air force, such as a college student, a high school student, and a 26-year-old worker with a family (played by an uncredited Don DeFore.) Stewart assures each that they can join the air force and still be able to keep their various educational, occupational and family commitments. Then the film details the average mustering in process, about the medical exams, the cadet training and learning how to fly. The short recruitment film appeared in movie theaters nationwide beginning in late May 1942 and was very successful, resulting in 150,000 new recruits.

Due to racial segregation policies of the U.S. Army Air Forces, there are no African Americans depicted in the film, although, at the time of the film's creation, the first black aviators had already begun serving in the military, mainly the Tuskegee Airmen program.

Winning Your Wings was preserved by the Academy Film Archive and the UCLA Film and Television Archive in 2013.

This film was produced in 1942 during World War II and therefore the aircraft production numbers described in the film are likely to have been inflated for propaganda and misinformation to the enemy purposes. They do not correlate with World War II aircraft production or United States aircraft production during World War II.
