= List of Jewish Academy Award winners and nominees =

This is a list of Jewish winners and nominees of Academy Awards. It includes ethnic Jews and those who converted to Judaism.

== Best Actor in a Leading Role ==
Best Actor in a Leading Role
Year	Name	Film	Role	Status	Milestone / Notes
1928/1929	Paul Muni	The Valiant	James Dyke	Nominated	First Jewish actor nominated for an Academy Award
1930/1931	Jackie Cooper	Skippy	Skippy Skinner	Nominated	Jewish father
1932/1933	Leslie Howard	Berkeley Square	Peter Standish	Nominated	
1932/1933	Paul Muni	I Am a Fugitive from a Chain Gang	James Allen	Nominated	
1935	Paul Muni	Black Fury	Joe Radek	Nominated	
1936	Paul Muni	The Story of Louis Pasteur	Louis Pasteur	Won	First Jewish actor to win an Academy Award
1937	Paul Muni	The Life of Emile Zola	Émile Zola	Nominated	
1938	Leslie Howard	Pygmalion	Professor Henry Higgins	Nominated	
1941	Cary Grant	Penny Serenade	Roger Adams	Nominated	As to his – disputed – Jewishness, see here.
1943	Paul Lukas	Watch on the Rhine	Kurt Muller	Won	
1944	Cary Grant	None but the Lonely Heart	Ernie Mott	Nominated	
1945	Cornel Wilde	A Song to Remember	Frédéric Chopin	Nominated	
1946	Larry Parks	The Jolson Story	Al Jolson	Nominated	
1947	John Garfield	Body and Soul	Charlie Davis	Nominated	
1949	Kirk Douglas	Champion	Michael "Midge" Kelly	Nominated	
1952	Kirk Douglas	The Bad and the Beautiful	Jonathan Shields	Nominated	
1956	Kirk Douglas	Lust for Life	Vincent van Gogh	Nominated	
1958	Tony Curtis	The Defiant Ones	John 'Joker' Jackson	Nominated	
1958	Paul Newman	Cat on a Hot Tin Roof	Brick Pollitt	Nominated	Jewish father
1959	Laurence Harvey	Room at the Top	Joe Lampton	Nominated	
1959	Paul Muni	The Last Angry Man	Dr. Sam Abelman	Nominated	
1961	Paul Newman	The Hustler	Eddie Felson	Nominated	
1961	Stuart Whitman	The Mark	Jim Fuller	Nominated	
1963	Paul Newman	Hud	Hud Bannon	Nominated	
1964	Peter Sellers	Dr. Strangelove	Group Captain Lionel Mandrake / President Merkin Muffley / Dr. Strangelove	Nominated	
1966	Alan Arkin	The Russians Are Coming, the Russians Are Coming	Lt. Rozanov	Nominated	
1967	Dustin Hoffman	The Graduate	Benjamin Braddock	Nominated	
1967	Paul Newman	Cool Hand Luke	Lucas "Cool Hand Luke" Jackson	Nominated	
1968	Alan Arkin	The Heart Is a Lonely Hunter	John Singer	Nominated	
1968	Ron Moody	Oliver!	Fagin	Nominated	
1969	Dustin Hoffman	Midnight Cowboy	Enrico Salvatore "Ratso" "Rico" Rizzo	Nominated	
1970	Melvyn Douglas	I Never Sang for My Father	Tom Garrison	Nominated	Jewish father
1970	Ryan O'Neal	Love Story	Oliver Barrett IV	Nominated	Jewish maternal grandmother
1971	Walter Matthau	Kotch	Joseph P. Kotcher	Nominated	
1971	Topol	Fiddler on the Roof	Tevye	Nominated	
1974	Dustin Hoffman	Lenny	Lenny Bruce	Nominated	
1975	Walter Matthau	The Sunshine Boys	Willy Clark	Nominated	
1976	Sylvester Stallone	Rocky	Rocky Balboa	Nominated	Jewish maternal grandfather
1977	Richard Dreyfuss	The Goodbye Girl	Elliot Garfield	Won	
1977	Woody Allen	Annie Hall	Alvy Singer	Nominated	
1979	Dustin Hoffman	Kramer vs. Kramer	Ted Kramer	Won	
1979	Peter Sellers	Being There	Chance the Gardener/Chauncey Gardiner	Nominated	
1981	Paul Newman	Absence of Malice	Michael Colin Gallagher	Nominated	
1982	Dustin Hoffman	Tootsie	Michael Dorsey/Dorothy Michaels	Nominated	
1982	Paul Newman	The Verdict	Frank Galvin	Nominated	
1985	Harrison Ford	Witness	Detective Captain John Book	Nominated	
1986	Paul Newman	The Color of Money	Fast Eddie Felson	Won	
1987	Michael Douglas	Wall Street	Gordon Gekko	Won	Jewish father
1988	Dustin Hoffman	Rain Man	Raymond Babbitt	Won	
1989	Daniel Day-Lewis	My Left Foot	Christy Brown	Won	Jewish Mother
1992	Robert Downey Jr.	Chaplin	Charlie Chaplin	Nominated	Jewish father
1993	Daniel Day-Lewis	In the Name of the Father	Gerry Conlon	Nominated	
1994	Paul Newman	Nobody's Fool	Donald "Sully" Sullivan	Nominated	
1995	Richard Dreyfuss	Mr. Holland's Opus	Glenn Holland	Nominated	
1995	Sean Penn	Dead Man Walking	Matthew Poncelet	Nominated	
1997	Dustin Hoffman	Wag the Dog	Stanley Motss	Nominated	
1999	Sean Penn	Sweet and Lowdown	Emmet Ray	Nominated	
2001	Sean Penn	I Am Sam	Sam Dawson	Nominated	
2002	Adrien Brody	The Pianist	Władysław Szpilman	Won	
2002	Daniel Day-Lewis	Gangs of New York	William "Bill the Butcher" Cutting	Nominated	
2003	Sean Penn	Mystic River	Jimmy Markum	Won	Jewish father
2005	Joaquin Phoenix	Walk the Line	Johnny Cash	Nominated	
2007	Daniel Day-Lewis	There Will Be Blood	Daniel Plainview	Won	
2008	Sean Penn	Milk	Harvey Milk	Won	
2010	Jesse Eisenberg	The Social Network	Mark Zuckerberg	Nominated	
2010	James Franco	127 Hours	Aron Ralston	Nominated	
2012	Daniel Day-Lewis	Lincoln	Abraham Lincoln	Won	
2012	Joaquin Phoenix	The Master	Freddie Quell	Nominated	
2016	Andrew Garfield	Hacksaw Ridge	Desmond T. Doss	Nominated	
2017	Daniel Day-Lewis	Phantom Thread	Reynolds Woodcock	Nominated	
2017	Timothée Chalamet	Call Me by Your Name	Elio Perlman	Nominated	
2019	Joaquin Phoenix	Joker	Arthur Fleck / Joker	Won	
2021	Andrew Garfield	tick, tick... BOOM!	Jonathan Larson	Nominated	
2024	Adrien Brody	The Brutalist	László Tóth	Won	
2024	Timothée Chalamet	A Complete Unknown	Bob Dylan	Nominated	
2025	Timothée Chalamet	Marty Supreme	Marty Mauser	Nominated	

== Best Actress in a Leading Role ==
Best Actress in a Leading Role
Year	Name	Film	Role	Status	Milestone / Notes
1929/1930	Norma Shearer	The Divorcee	Jerry Bernard Martin	Won	Converted to Judaism. First Jewish actress to win an Academy Award.
1929/1930	Norma Shearer	Their Own Desire	Lucia Marlett	Nominated	
1930/1931	Norma Shearer	A Free Soul	Jan Ashe	Nominated	
1934	Norma Shearer	The Barretts of Wimpole Street	Elizabeth Barrett	Nominated	
1935	Elisabeth Bergner	Escape Me Never	Gemma Jones	Nominated	
1936	Luise Rainer	The Great Ziegfeld	Anna Held	Won	First Jewish born actress to win an Academy Award
1936	Norma Shearer	Romeo and Juliet	Juliet Capulet	Nominated	
1937	Luise Rainer	The Good Earth	O-Lan	Won	
1938	Norma Shearer	Marie Antoinette	Marie Antoinette	Nominated	
1950	Judy Holliday	Born Yesterday	Emma "Billie" Dawn	Won	
1950	Eleanor Parker	Caged	Marie Allen	Nominated	Converted to Judaism
1951	Shelley Winters	A Place in the Sun	Alice Tripp	Nominated	
1951	Eleanor Parker	Detective Story	Mary McLeod	Nominated	
1955	Eleanor Parker	Interrupted Melody	Marjorie Lawrence	Nominated	
1956	Carroll Baker	Baby Doll	Baby Doll Meighan	Nominated	Converted to Judaism
1957	Elizabeth Taylor	Raintree County	Susanna Drake	Nominated	Converted to Judaism in 1959
1958	Elizabeth Taylor	Cat on a Hot Tin Roof	Margaret "Maggie the Cat" Pollitt	Nominated	Converted to Judaism in 1959
1959	Simone Signoret	Room at the Top	Alice Aisgill	Won	
1959	Elizabeth Taylor	Suddenly, Last Summer	Catherine Holly	Nominated	
1960	Elizabeth Taylor	BUtterfield 8	Gloria Wandrous	Won	
1961	Piper Laurie	The Hustler	Sarah Packard	Nominated	
1964	Kim Stanley	Séance on a Wet Afternoon	Myra Savage	Nominated	Converted to Judaism
1965	Simone Signoret	Ship of Fools	La Contessa	Nominated	
1966	Elizabeth Taylor	Who's Afraid of Virginia Woolf?	Martha	Won	
1966	Anouk Aimée	A Man and a Woman	Anne Gauthier	Nominated	Converted to Judaism; Jewish father
1966	Ida Kamińska	The Shop on Main Street	Rozalie Lautmann	Nominated	
1968	Barbra Streisand	Funny Girl	Fanny Brice	Won	Tied with Katharine Hepburn for The Lion in Winter
1970	Ali MacGraw	Love Story	Jennifer Cavalleri-Barrett	Nominated	
1971	Janet Suzman	Nicholas and Alexandra	Empress Alexandra of Russia	Nominated	
1973	Barbra Streisand	The Way We Were	Katie Morosky	Nominated	
1975	Carol Kane	Hester Street	Gitl	Nominated	
1978	Jill Clayburgh	An Unmarried Woman	Erica Benton	Nominated	Jewish father
1979	Jill Clayburgh	Starting Over	Marilyn Holmberg	Nominated	
1979	Bette Midler	The Rose	Mary Rose Foster	Nominated	
1980	Goldie Hawn	Private Benjamin	Judy Benjamin	Nominated	
1982	Debra Winger	An Officer and a Gentleman	Paula Pokrifki	Nominated	
1983	Debra Winger	Terms of Endearment	Emma Greenway Horton	Nominated	
1986	Marlee Matlin	Children of a Lesser God	Sarah Norman	Won	At age 21, she is the youngest Best Actress winner.
1991	Bette Midler	For the Boys	Dixie Leonard	Nominated	
1993	Debra Winger	Shadowlands	Joy Davidman	Nominated	
1994	Winona Ryder	Little Women	Josephine "Jo" March	Nominated	Jewish father
1997	Helen Hunt	As Good as It Gets	Carol Connelly	Won	Jewish father
1997	Helena Bonham Carter	The Wings of the Dove	Kate Croy	Nominated	
1998	Gwyneth Paltrow	Shakespeare in Love	Viola de Lesseps/Thomas Kent	Won	Jewish father
2010	Natalie Portman	Black Swan	Nina Sayers	Won	
2016	Isabelle Huppert	Elle	Michèle Leblanc	Nominated	Huppert is of Hungarian-Jewish descent
2016	Natalie Portman	Jackie	Jacqueline Kennedy Onassis	Nominated	
2019	Scarlett Johansson	Marriage Story	Nicole Barber	Nominated	
2021	Kristen Stewart	Spencer	Diana, Princess of Wales (née Spencer)	Nominated	Jewish mother
2024	Mikey Madison	Anora	Anora "Ani" Mikheeva	Won	
2025	Kate Hudson	Song Sung Blue	Claire Sardina	Nominated	

== Best Actor in a Supporting Role ==
Best Actor in a Supporting Role
Year	Name	Film	Role	Status	Milestone / Notes
1936	Mischa Auer	My Man Godfrey	Carlo	Nominated	
1937	Joseph Schildkraut	The Life of Emile Zola	Captain Alfred Dreyfus	Won	
1938	John Garfield	Four Daughters	Mickey Borden	Nominated	
1945	Michael Chekhov	Spellbound	Dr. Alexander "Alex" Brulov	Nominated	
1948	Oscar Homolka	I Remember Mama	Uncle Chris Halverson	Nominated	
1950	Sam Jaffe	The Asphalt Jungle	Dr. Erwin Riedenschneider	Nominated	
1950	Erich von Stroheim	Sunset Boulevard	Max von Meyerling	Nominated	
1950	Jeff Chandler	Broken Arrow	Cochise	Nominated	
1951	Leo Genn	Quo Vadis	Petronius	Nominated	
1951	Peter Ustinov	Quo Vadis	Nero	Nominated	
1951	Kevin McCarthy	Death of a Salesman	Biff Loman	Nominated	
1953	Robert Strauss	Stalag 17	Sgt. Stanislas "Animal" Kasava	Nominated	
1954	Lee J. Cobb	On the Waterfront	Johnny Friendly	Nominated	
1957	Red Buttons	Sayonara	Airman Joe Kelly	Won	
1958	Theodore Bikel	The Defiant Ones	Sheriff Max Muller	Nominated	
1958	Lee J. Cobb	The Brothers Karamazov	Fyodor Karamazov	Nominated	
1959	Ed Wynn	The Diary of Anne Frank	Albert Dussell	Nominated	
1960	Peter Ustinov	Spartacus	Lentulus Batiatus	Won	
1960	Peter Falk	Murder, Inc.	Abe "Kid Twist" Reles	Nominated	
1960	Jack Kruschen	The Apartment	Dr. Dreyfuss	Nominated	
1961	Peter Falk	Pocketful of Miracles	Joy Boy	Nominated	
1963	Melvyn Douglas	Hud	Homer Bannon	Won	Jewish father
1964	Peter Ustinov	Topkapi	Arthur Simon Simpson	Won	
1965	Martin Balsam	A Thousand Clowns	Arnold Burns	Won	
1966	Walter Matthau	The Fortune Cookie	Willie Gingrich	Won	
1966	George Segal	Who's Afraid of Virginia Woolf?	Nick	Nominated	
1968	Jack Albertson	The Subject Was Roses	John Cleary	Won	
1968	Gene Wilder	The Producers	Leo Bloom	Nominated	
1969	Elliott Gould	Bob & Carol & Ted & Alice	Ted Henderson	Nominated	
1970	John Marley	Love Story	Phil Cavalleri	Nominated	
1971	Leonard Frey	Fiddler on the Roof	Motel Kamzoil	Nominated	
1972	Joel Grey	Cabaret	Master of Ceremonies	Won	
1972	James Caan	The Godfather	Sonny Corleone	Nominated	
1973	John Houseman	The Paper Chase	Charles W. Kingsfield Jr.	Won	Jewish father
1973	Jack Gilford	Save the Tiger	Phil Greene	Nominated	
1974	Fred Astaire	The Towering Inferno	Harlee Claiborne	Nominated	Jewish father
1974	Lee Strasberg	The Godfather Part II	Hyman Roth	Nominated	
1975	George Burns	The Sunshine Boys	Al Lewis	Won	
1979	Melvyn Douglas	Being There	Benjamin Turnbull Rand	Won	
1980	Judd Hirsch	Ordinary People	Dr. Tyrone C. Berger	Nominated	
1987	Albert Brooks	Broadcast News	Aaron Altman	Nominated	
1988	Kevin Kline	A Fish Called Wanda	Otto West	Won	Jewish father
1988	Martin Landau	Tucker: The Man and His Dream	Abe Karatz	Nominated	
1988	River Phoenix	Running on Empty	Danny Pope	Nominated	
1989	Martin Landau	Crimes and Misdemeanors	Judah Rosenthal	Nominated	
1991	Harvey Keitel	Bugsy	Mickey Cohen	Nominated	
1991	Michael Lerner	Barton Fink	Jack Lipnick	Nominated	
1992	David Paymer	Mr. Saturday Night	Stan Young	Nominated	
1994	Martin Landau	Ed Wood	Bela Lugosi	Won	
2000	Joaquin Phoenix	Gladiator	Commodus	Nominated	Jewish maternal grandfather and Jewish maternal grandmother
2002	Paul Newman	Road to Perdition	John Rooney	Nominated	Jewish father
2005	Jake Gyllenhaal	Brokeback Mountain	Jack Twist	Nominated	
2006	Alan Arkin	Little Miss Sunshine	Edwin Hoover	Won	
2008	Robert Downey Jr.	Tropic Thunder	Kirk Lazarus	Nominated	
2011	Jonah Hill	Moneyball	Peter Brand	Nominated	
2012	Alan Arkin	Argo	Lester Siegel	Nominated	
2013	Jonah Hill	The Wolf of Wall Street	Donnie Azoff	Nominated	
2015	Sylvester Stallone	Creed	Rocky Balboa	Nominated	Jewish maternal grandfather
2020/2021	Sacha Baron Cohen	The Trial of the Chicago 7	Abbie Hoffman	Nominated	
2022	Judd Hirsch	The Fabelmans	Boris Podgorny	Nominated	
2023	Robert Downey Jr.	Oppenheimer	Lewis Strauss	Won	Jewish father.
2024	Jeremy Strong	The Apprentice	Roy Cohn	Nominated	
2025	Sean Penn	One Battle After Another	Colonel Steven J. Lockjaw	Won	

== Best Actress in a Supporting Role ==
Best Actress in a Supporting Role
Year	Name	Film	Role	Status	Milestone / Notes
1943	Paulette Goddard	So Proudly We Hail!	Joan O'Doul	Nominated	Jewish father
1944	Aline MacMahon	Dragon Seed	Ling Tan's Wife	Nominated	
1945	Joan Lorring	The Corn is Green	Bessie Watty	Nominated	
1951	Joan Blondell	The Blue Veil	Annie Rawlins	Nominated	
1951	Lee Grant	Detective Story	The Shoplifter	Nominated	
1957	Carolyn Jones	The Bachelor Party	The Existentialist	Nominated	Converted to Judaism
1958	Martha Hyer	Some Came Running	Gwen French	Nominated	Converted to Judaism
1958	Cara Williams	The Defiant Ones	Billy's Mother	Nominated	
1959	Shelley Winters	The Diary of Anne Frank	Petronella van Daan	Won	
1959	Susan Kohner	Imitation of Life	Sarah Jane Johnson	Nominated	
1963	Lilia Skala	Lilies of the Field	Mother Maria Marthe	Nominated	Jewish father
1964	Grayson Hall	The Night of the Iguana	Judith Fellowes	Nominated	
1966	Shelley Winters	A Patch of Blue	Rose-ann D'Arcey	Won	
1967	Carol Channing	Thoroughly Modern Millie	Muzzy von Hossmere	Nominated	Jewish maternal grandparents
1969	Goldie Hawn	Cactus Flower	Toni Simmons	Won	
1969	Dyan Cannon	Bob & Carol & Ted & Alice	Alice Henderson	Nominated	
1969	Sylvia Miles	Midnight Cowboy	Cass	Nominated	
1970	Lee Grant	The Landlord	Joyce Enders	Nominated	
1972	Jeannie Berlin	The Heartbreak Kid	Lila Kolodny	Nominated	
1972	Shelley Winters	The Poseidon Adventure	Belle Rosen	Nominated	
1973	Tatum O'Neal	Paper Moon	Addie Loggins	Won	Father of partial Jewish ancestry
1973	Madeline Kahn	Paper Moon	Trixie Delight	Nominated	
1973	Sylvia Sidney	Summer Wishes, Winter Dreams	Mrs. Pritchett	Nominated	
1974	Madeline Kahn	Blazing Saddles	Lili von Shtupp	Nominated	
1975	Lee Grant	Shampoo	Felicia Karpf	Won	
1975	Sylvia Miles	Farewell, My Lovely	Jessie Halstead Florian	Nominated	
1976	Lee Grant	Voyage of the Damned	Lee Rosen	Nominated	
1976	Piper Laurie	Carrie	Margaret White	Nominated	
1977	Leslie Browne	The Turning Point	Emilia Rodgers	Nominated	Jewish mother
1978	Dyan Cannon	Heaven Can Wait	Julia Farnsworth	Nominated	
1979	Barbara Barrie	Breaking Away	Evelyn Stoller	Nominated	
1982	Kim Stanley	Frances	Lillian Van Ornum Farmer	Nominated	Converted to Judaism
1982	Lesley Ann Warren	Victor/Victoria	Norma Cassidy	Nominated	
1983	Amy Irving	Yentl	Hadass Vishkower	Nominated	
1986	Piper Laurie	Children of a Lesser God	Mrs. Norman	Nominated	
1993	Winona Ryder	The Age of Innocence	May Welland	Nominated	Jewish father
1995	Mare Winningham	Georgia	Georgia Flood	Nominated	Converted to Judaism
1996	Lauren Bacall	The Mirror Has Two Faces	Hannah Morgan	Nominated	
1996	Barbara Hershey	The Portrait of a Lady	Madame Serena Merle	Nominated	Jewish father
2000	Kate Hudson	Almost Famous	Penny Lane	Nominated	
2001	Jennifer Connelly	A Beautiful Mind	Alicia Nash	Won	Jewish mother
2004	Sophie Okonedo	Hotel Rwanda	Tatiana Rusesabagina	Nominated	
2004	Natalie Portman	Closer	Jane Jones/Alice Ayres	Nominated	
2005	Rachel Weisz	The Constant Gardener	Tessa Abbott-Quayle	Won	
2006	Abigail Breslin	Little Miss Sunshine	Olive Hoover	Nominated	Jewish paternal grandmother
2009	Maggie Gyllenhaal	Crazy Heart	Jean Craddock	Nominated	
2010	Helena Bonham Carter	The King's Speech	Queen Elizabeth	Nominated	
2010	Hailee Steinfeld	True Grit	Mattie Ross	Nominated	Jewish father
2012	Helen Hunt	The Sessions	Cheryl Cohen-Greene	Nominated	Jewish paternal grandmother
2013	June Squibb	Nebraska	Kate Grant	Nominated	Converted to Judaism
2014	Patricia Arquette	Boyhood	Olivia Evans	Won	Jewish mother
2015	Jennifer Jason Leigh	The Hateful Eight	Daisy Domergue	Nominated	
2018	Rachel Weisz	The Favourite	Sarah Churchill, Duchess of Marlborough	Nominated	
2019	Scarlett Johansson	Jojo Rabbit	Rosie Betzler	Nominated	
2022	Jamie Lee Curtis	Everything Everywhere All at Once	Deirdre Beaubeirdre	Won	Jewish father

== Best Animated Feature ==
Best Animated Feature
Year	Name	Film	Status	Milestone / Notes
2002	Jeffrey Katzenberg	Spirit: Stallion of the Cimarron	Nominated	
2004	Bill Damaschke	Shark Tale	Nominated	
2006	Gil Kenan	Monster House	Nominated	
2010	Lee Unkrich	Toy Story 3	Won	
2015	Charlie Kaufman	Anomalisa	Nominated	Shared with Duke Johnson and Rosa Tran
2016	Osnat Shurer	Moana	Nominated	Shared with John Musker and Ron Clements
2017	Lee Unkrich	Coco	Won	Shared with Darla K. Anderson
2018	Rodney Rothman	Spider-Man: Into the Spider-Verse	Won	Shared with Bob Persichetti, Peter Ramsey, and Phil Lord and Christopher Miller
2018	Scott Rudin; Steven Rales	Isle of Dogs	Nominated	Shared with Wes Anderson and Jeremy Dawson
2021	Osnat Shurer	Raya and the Last Dragon	Nominated	Shared with Don Hall, Carlos López Estrada, and Peter Del Vecho
2022	Paul Mezey	Marcel the Shell with Shoes On	Nominated	Shared with Dean Fleischer Camp, Elisabeth Holm, Andrew Goldman, and Caroline Kaplan
2023	Amy Pascal	Spider-Man: Across the Spider-Verse	Nominated	Shared with Kemp Powers, Justin K. Thompson, and Phil Lord and Christopher Miller
2025	Natalie Portman	Arco	Nominated	Shared with Ugo Bienvenu, Félix de Givry, and Sophie Mas

== Best Assistant Director ==
Best Assistant Director
Year	Name	Film	Status	Milestone / Notes
1932/1933	Ben Silvey		Nominated	In the first year of the award, it referred to no specific film.

Note: Defunct category.

== Best Cinematography ==
Best Cinematography
Year	Name	Film	Status	Milestone / Notes
1937	Karl Freund	The Good Earth	Won	Black and White
1938	Joseph Ruttenberg	The Great Waltz	Won	Black and White
1940	Joseph Ruttenberg	Waterloo Bridge	Nominated	Black and White
1940	Rudolph Maté	Foreign Correspondent	Nominated	Black and White
1941	Joseph Ruttenberg	Dr. Jekyll and Mr. Hyde	Nominated	Black and White
1941	Rudolph Maté	That Hamilton Woman	Nominated	Black and White
1941	Karl Freund	The Chocolate Soldier	Nominated	Black and White
1941	Karl Freund	Blossoms in the Dust	Nominated	Color, shared with W. Howard Greene
1942	Joseph Ruttenberg	Mrs. Miniver	Won	Black and White
1942	Stanley Cortez	The Magnificent Ambersons	Nominated	Black and White
1942	Rudolph Maté	The Pride of the Yankees	Nominated	Black and White
1942	Milton Krasner	Arabian Nights	Nominated	Color, shared with William V. Skall and W. Howard Greene
1943	Joseph Ruttenberg	Madame Curie	Nominated	Black and White
1943	Rudolph Maté	Sahara	Nominated	Black and White
1944	Joseph Ruttenberg	Gaslight	Nominated	Black and White
1944	Stanley Cortez	Since You Went Away	Nominated	Black and White, shared with Lee Garmes
1944	Rudolph Maté	Cover Girl	Nominated	Color
1949	Paul C. Vogel	Battleground	Won	Black and White
1949	Franz Planer	Champion	Nominated	Black and White
1949	Charles Schoenbaum	Little Women	Nominated	Color, shared with Robert H. Planck
1950	Milton Krasner	All About Eve	Nominated	Black and White
1951	John Alton	An American in Paris	Won	Color, shared with Alfred Gilks
1951	Franz Planer	Death of a Salesman	Nominated	Black and White
1953	Joseph Ruttenberg	Julius Caesar	Nominated	Black and White
1953	Franz Planer	Roman Holiday	Nominated	Black and White, shared with Henri Alekan
1954	Boris Kaufman	On the Waterfront	Won	Black and White
1954	Milton Krasner	Three Coins in the Fountain	Won	Color
1956	Joseph Ruttenberg	Somebody Up There Likes Me	Won	Black and White
1956	Boris Kaufman	Baby Doll	Nominated	Black and White
1957	Milton Krasner	An Affair to Remember	Nominated	
1958	Joseph Ruttenberg	Gigi	Won	Color
1959	Franz Planer	The Nun's Story	Nominated	Color
1960	Joseph Ruttenberg	BUtterfield 8	Nominated	Color, shared with Charles Harten
1961	Eugen Schüfftan	The Hustler	Won	Black and White
1961	Franz Planer	The Children's Hour	Nominated	Black and White
1962	Paul C. Vogel	The Wonderful World of the Brothers Grimm	Nominated	Color
1963	Milton Krasner	Love with the Proper Stranger	Nominated	Black and White
1963	Milton Krasner	How the West Was Won	Nominated	Color, shared with William Daniels, Charles Lang, and Joseph LaShelle
1964	Walter Lassally	Zorba the Greek	Won	Black and White. Lassally's family was of Jewish ancestry, but practiced Protestantism.
1964	Milton Krasner	Fate Is the Hunter	Nominated	Black and White
1966	Haskell Wexler	Who's Afraid of Virginia Woolf?	Won	Black and White
1967	Richard H. Kline	Camelot	Nominated	
1971	Owen Roizman	The French Connection	Nominated	
1973	Owen Roizman	The Exorcist	Nominated	
1975	Haskell Wexler	One Flew Over the Cuckoo's Nest	Nominated	Shared with Bill Butler
1976	Haskell Wexler	Bound for Glory	Won	
1976	Richard H. Kline	King Kong	Nominated	
1976	Owen Roizman	Network	Nominated	
1982	Owen Roizman	Tootsie	Nominated	
1987	Haskell Wexler	Matewan	Nominated	
1989	Haskell Wexler	Blaze	Nominated	
1989	Mikael Salomon	The Abyss	Nominated	
1991	Stephen Goldblatt	The Prince of Tides	Nominated	
1991	Adam Greenberg	Terminator 2: Judgment Day	Nominated	
1994	Owen Roizman	Wyatt Earp	Nominated	
1995	Stephen Goldblatt	Batman Forever	Nominated	
1995	Emmanuel Lubezki	A Little Princess	Nominated	
1999	Emmanuel Lubezki	Sleepy Hollow	Nominated	
2002	Edward Lachman	Far from Heaven	Nominated	
2002	Paweł Edelman	The Pianist	Nominated	
2003	John Schwartzman	Seabiscuit	Nominated	
2005	Emmanuel Lubezki	The New World	Nominated	
2006	Emmanuel Lubezki	Children of Men	Nominated	
2010	Danny Cohen	The King's Speech	Nominated	
2011	Guillaume Schiffman	The Artist	Nominated	
2011	Emmanuel Lubezki	The Tree of Life	Nominated	
2013	Emmanuel Lubezki	Gravity	Won	
2014	Emmanuel Lubezki	Birdman	Won	
2015	Emmanuel Lubezki	The Revenant	Won	
2015	Edward Lachman	Carol	Nominated	
2017	Hoyte van Hoytema	Dunkirk	Nominated	
2017	Rachel Morrison	Mudbound	Nominated	
2019	Lawrence Sher	Joker	Nominated	
2023	Hoyte van Hoytema	Oppenheimer	Won	
2023	Edward Lachman	El Conde	Nominated	
2024	Edward Lachman	Maria	Nominated	

== Best Costume Design ==
Best Costume Design
Year	Name	Film	Status	Milestone / Notes
1948	Edith Head	The Emperor Waltz	Nominated	Color, shared with Gile Steele
1948	Irene Lentz	B.F.'s Daughter	Nominated	Black and White
1949	Edith Head	The Heiress	Won	Black and White, shared with Gile Steele
1950	Edith Head	Samson and Delilah	Won	Color, shared with Charles LeMaire, Dorothy Jeakins, Elois Jenssen, Gile Steele and Gwen Wakeling
1950	Edith Head	All About Eve	Won	Black and White, shared with Charles LeMaire
1951	Edith Head	A Place in the Sun	Won	Black and White
1951	Helen Rose	The Great Caruso	Nominated	Color, shared with Gile Steele. Posthumous nomination for Steele
1952	Edith Head	The Greatest Show on Earth	Nominated	Color, shared with Dorothy Jeakins and Miles White
1952	Edith Head	Carrie	Nominated	Black and White
1952	Helen Rose	The Bad and the Beautiful	Won	Black and White
1952	Helen Rose	The Merry Widow	Nominated	Color, shared with Gile Steele. Posthumous nomination for Steele
1953	Edith Head	Roman Holiday	Won	Black and White
1953	Helen Rose	Dream Wife	Nominated	Color, shared with Herschel McCoy
1954	Edith Head	Sabrina	Won	Black and White
1954	Helen Rose	Executive Suite	Nominated	Black and White
1955	Edith Head	To Catch a Thief	Nominated	Color
1955	Edith Head	The Rose Tattoo	Nominated	Black and White
1955	Helen Rose	I'll Cry Tomorrow	Won	Black and White
1955	Helen Rose	Interrupted Melody	Nominated	Color
1956	Edith Head	The Ten Commandments	Nominated	Color, shared with Ralph Jester, John Jensen, Dorothy Jeakins and Arnold Friberg
1956	Edith Head	The Proud and Profane	Nominated	Black and White
1956	Helen Rose	The Power and the Prize	Nominated	Black and White
1957	Edith Head	Funny Face	Nominated	Shared with Hubert de Givenchy
1958	Edith Head	The Buccaneer	Nominated	Shared with Ralph Jester and John Jensen
1959	Edith Head	The Five Pennies	Nominated	Color
1959	Edith Head	Career	Nominated	Black and White
1959	Helen Rose	The Gazebo	Nominated	Black and White
1960	Edith Head	Pepe	Nominated	Color
1960	Edith Head	The Facts of Life	Won	Black and White, shared with Edward Stevenson
1960	Irene Lentz	Midnight Lace	Nominated	Color
1961	Edith Head	Pocketful of Miracles	Nominated	Color, shared with Walter Plunkett
1962	Edith Head	My Geisha	Nominated	Color
1962	Edith Head	The Man Who Shot Liberty Valance	Nominated	Black and White
1962	Ruth Morley	The Miracle Worker	Nominated	Black and White
1963	Edith Head	A New Kind of Love	Nominated	Color
1963	Edith Head	Love with the Proper Stranger	Nominated	Black and White
1963	Edith Head	Wives and Lovers	Nominated	Black and White
1963	Donald Brooks	The Cardinal	Nominated	Color
1964	Edith Head	What a Way to Go!	Nominated	Color, shared with Moss Mabry
1964	Edith Head	A House Is Not a Home	Nominated	Black and White
1965	Edith Head	Inside Daisy Clover	Nominated	Color, shared with Bill Thomas
1965	Edith Head	The Slender Thread	Nominated	Black and White
1966	Edith Head	The Oscar	Nominated	Color
1966	Helen Rose	Mister Buddwing	Nominated	Black and White
1968	Donald Brooks	Star!	Nominated	
1969	Edith Head	Sweet Charity	Nominated	
1970	Edith Head	Airport	Nominated	
1970	Donald Brooks	Darling Lili	Nominated	Shared with Jack Bear
1973	Edith Head	The Sting	Won	
1975	Edith Head	The Man Who Would Be King	Nominated	
1977	Edith Head	Airport '77	Nominated	Shared with Burton Miller
1979	Albert Wolsky	All That Jazz	Won	
1982	Albert Wolsky	Sophie's Choice	Nominated	
1985	Albert Wolsky	The Journey of Natty Gann	Nominated	
1988	Deborah Nadoolman	Coming to America	Nominated	
1991	Albert Wolsky	Bugsy	Won	
1992	Albert Wolsky	Toys	Nominated	
1994	Jeffrey Kurland	Bullets over Broadway	Nominated	
1995	Julie Weiss	12 Monkeys	Nominated	
1998	Judianna Makovsky	Pleasantville	Nominated	
2000	Rita Ryack	How the Grinch Stole Christmas	Nominated	
2001	Judianna Makovsky	Harry Potter and the Philosopher's Stone	Nominated	
2002	Julie Weiss	Frida	Nominated	
2003	Judianna Makovsky	Seabiscuit	Nominated	
2007	Albert Wolsky	Across the Universe	Nominated	
2008	Albert Wolsky	Revolutionary Road	Nominated	
2008	Danny Glicker	Milk	Nominated	

== Best Dance Direction ==
Best Dance Direction
Year	Name	Film(s)	Dance Number(s)	Status	Milestone / Notes
1935	Dave Gould	Broadway Melody of 1936; Folies Bergère de Paris	"I've Got a Feeling You're Fooling" "Straw Hat"	Won	
1935	Benjamin Zemach	She	"Hall of Kings"	Nominated	
1936	Dave Gould	Born to Dance	"Swingin' the Jinx Away"	Nominated	
1937	Dave Gould	A Day at the Races	"All God's Chillun Got Rhythm"	Nominated	

Note: Defunct category.

== Best Director ==
Best Director
Year	Name	Film	Status	Milestone / Notes
1927/1928	Lewis Milestone	Two Arabian Knights	Won	Comedy Picture Category
1928/1929	Ernst Lubitsch	The Patriot	Nominated	
1929/1930	Lewis Milestone	All Quiet on the Western Front	Won	
1929/1930	Ernst Lubitsch	The Love Parade	Nominated	
1930/1931	Norman Taurog	Skippy	Won	
1930/1931	Lewis Milestone	The Front Page	Nominated	
1930/1931	Josef von Sternberg	Morocco	Nominated	
1931/1932	Josef von Sternberg	Shanghai Express	Nominated	
1932/1933	George Cukor	Little Women	Nominated	
1936	William Wyler	Dodsworth	Nominated	
1938	Michael Curtiz	Angels with Dirty Faces	Nominated	
1938	Michael Curtiz	Four Daughters	Nominated	
1938	Norman Taurog	Boys Town	Nominated	
1939	William Wyler	Wuthering Heights	Nominated	
1940	George Cukor	The Philadelphia Story	Nominated	
1940	William Wyler	The Letter	Nominated	
1941	William Wyler	The Little Foxes	Nominated	
1942	William Wyler	Mrs. Miniver	Won	
1942	Michael Curtiz	Yankee Doodle Dandy	Nominated	
1942	Mervyn LeRoy	Random Harvest	Nominated	
1943	Michael Curtiz	Casablanca	Won	
1943	Ernst Lubitsch	The Love Parade	Nominated	
1944	Otto Preminger	Laura	Nominated	
1944	Billy Wilder	Double Indemnity	Nominated	
1945	Billy Wilder	The Lost Weekend	Won	
1946	William Wyler	The Best Years of Our Lives	Won	
1946	Robert Siodmak	The Killers	Nominated	
1947	George Cukor	A Double Life	Nominated	
1947	Henry Koster	The Bishop's Wife	Nominated	
1948	Anatole Litvak	The Snake Pit	Nominated	
1948	Fred Zinnemann	The Search	Nominated	
1949	Joseph L. Mankiewicz	A Letter to Three Wives	Won	
1949	William Wyler	The Heiress	Nominated	
1950	George Cukor	Born Yesterday	Nominated	
1950	Joseph L. Mankiewicz	All About Eve	Won	
1950	Billy Wilder	Sunset Boulevard	Nominated	
1951	William Wyler	Detective Story	Nominated	
1952	Cecil B. DeMille	The Greatest Show on Earth	Nominated	
1952	Joseph L. Mankiewicz	5 Fingers	Nominated	
1952	Fred Zinnemann	High Noon	Nominated	
1953	Fred Zinnemann	From Here to Eternity	Won	
1953	Billy Wilder	Stalag 17	Nominated	
1953	William Wyler	Roman Holiday	Nominated	
1954	Billy Wilder	Sabrina	Nominated	
1956	William Wyler	Friendly Persuasion	Nominated	
1957	Billy Wilder	Witness for the Prosecution	Nominated	
1957	Sidney Lumet	12 Angry Men	Nominated	
1957	Mark Robson	Peyton Place	Nominated	
1958	Mark Robson	The Inn of the Sixth Happiness	Nominated	
1958	Richard Brooks	Cat on a Hot Tin Roof	Nominated	
1958	Stanley Kramer	The Defiant Ones	Nominated	
1959	William Wyler	Ben-Hur	Won	
1959	Billy Wilder	Some Like It Hot	Nominated	
1959	Fred Zinnemann	The Nun's Story	Nominated	
1960	Billy Wilder	The Apartment	Won	
1960	Jules Dassin	Never on Sunday	Nominated	
1960	Fred Zinnemann	The Sundowners	Nominated	
1961	Jerome Robbins	West Side Story	Won	Shared with Robert Wise
1961	Stanley Kramer	Judgment at Nuremberg	Nominated	
1961	Robert Rossen	The Hustler	Nominated	
1962	Arthur Penn	The Miracle Worker	Nominated	
1963	Otto Preminger	The Cardinal	Nominated	
1963	Martin Ritt	Hud	Nominated	
1964	George Cukor	My Fair Lady	Won	
1964	Stanley Kubrick	Dr. Strangelove	Nominated	
1965	John Schlesinger	Darling	Nominated	
1965	William Wyler	The Collector	Nominated	
1966	Fred Zinnemann	A Man for All Seasons	Won	
1966	Richard Brooks	The Professionals	Nominated	
1966	Claude Lelouch	A Man and a Woman	Nominated	
1966	Mike Nichols	Who's Afraid of Virginia Woolf?	Nominated	
1967	Mike Nichols	The Graduate	Won	
1967	Richard Brooks	In Cold Blood	Nominated	
1967	Stanley Kramer	Guess Who's Coming to Dinner	Nominated	
1967	Arthur Penn	Bonnie and Clyde	Nominated	
1968	Stanley Kubrick	2001: A Space Odyssey	Nominated	
1968	Gillo Pontecorvo	The Battle of Algiers	Nominated	
1969	John Schlesinger	Midnight Cowboy	Won	
1969	Arthur Penn	Alice's Restaurant	Nominated	
1969	Sydney Pollack	They Shoot Horses, Don't They?	Nominated	
1970	Arthur Hiller	Love Story	Nominated	
1971	William Friedkin	The French Connection	Won	
1971	Stanley Kubrick	A Clockwork Orange	Nominated	
1971	Peter Bogdanovich	The Last Picture Show	Nominated	
1971	John Schlesinger	Sunday Bloody Sunday	Nominated	
1972	Joseph L. Mankiewicz	Sleuth	Nominated	
1973	William Friedkin	The Exorcist	Nominated	
1974	Roman Polanski	Chinatown	Nominated	
1975	Miloš Forman	One Flew Over the Cuckoo's Nest	Won	
1975	Stanley Kubrick	Barry Lyndon	Nominated	
1975	Sidney Lumet	Dog Day Afternoon	Nominated	
1976	Alan J. Pakula	All the President's Men	Nominated	
1976	Sidney Lumet	Network	Nominated	
1977	Woody Allen	Annie Hall	Won	
1977	Steven Spielberg	Close Encounters of the Third Kind	Nominated	
1977	Fred Zinnemann	Julia	Nominated	
1978	Woody Allen	Interiors	Nominated	
1978	Buck Henry	Heaven Can Wait	Nominated	Shared with Warren Beatty
1980	Roman Polanski	Tess	Nominated	
1981	Mark Rydell	On Golden Pond	Nominated	
1981	Steven Spielberg	Raiders of the Lost Ark	Nominated	
1982	Steven Spielberg	E.T. the Extra-Terrestrial	Nominated	
1982	Sidney Lumet	The Verdict	Nominated	
1982	Sydney Pollack	Tootsie	Nominated	
1983	James L. Brooks	Terms of Endearment	Won	
1983	Mike Nichols	Silkwood	Nominated	
1984	Miloš Forman	Amadeus	Nominated	
1984	Woody Allen	Broadway Danny Rose	Nominated	
1984	Roland Joffé	The Killing Fields	Nominated	
1985	Sydney Pollack	Out of Africa	Won	
1985	Héctor Babenco	Kiss of the Spider Woman	Nominated	
1986	Oliver Stone	Platoon	Won	Jewish father
1986	Woody Allen	Hannah and Her Sisters	Nominated	
1986	Roland Joffé	The Mission	Nominated	
1988	Barry Levinson	Rain Man	Won	
1988	Mike Nichols	Working Girl	Nominated	
1989	Oliver Stone	Born on the Fourth of July	Won	
1989	Woody Allen	Crimes and Misdemeanors	Nominated	
1990	Stephen Frears	The Grifters	Nominated	Jewish mother
1991	Barry Levinson	Bugsy	Nominated	
1991	Oliver Stone	JFK	Nominated	
1993	Steven Spielberg	Schindler's List	Won	
1994	Woody Allen	Bullets over Broadway	Nominated	
1995	Michael Radford	Il Postino: The Postman	Nominated	
1996	Joel Coen	Fargo	Nominated	
1996	Miloš Forman	The People vs. Larry Flynt	Nominated	
1996	Mike Leigh	Secrets & Lies	Nominated	
1998	Steven Spielberg	Saving Private Ryan	Won	
1999	Sam Mendes	American Beauty	Won	
1999	Spike Jonze	Being John Malkovich	Nominated	
1999	Michael Mann	The Insider	Nominated	
2002	Roman Polanski	The Pianist	Won	
2004	Mike Leigh	Vera Drake	Nominated	
2005	Bennett Miller	Capote	Nominated	
2005	Steven Spielberg	Munich	Nominated	
2006	Stephen Frears	The Queen	Nominated	
2007	Joel Coen; Ethan Coen	No Country for Old Men	Won	
2007	Jason Reitman	Juno	Nominated	
2007	Julian Schnabel	The Diving Bell and the Butterfly	Nominated	
2009	Jason Reitman	Up in the Air	Nominated	
2010	Darren Aronofsky	Black Swan	Nominated	Aronofsky is of Russian-Jewish descent
2010	Joel Coen; Ethan Coen	True Grit	Nominated	
2010	David O. Russell	The Fighter	Nominated	Russell is of Russian-Jewish descent
2011	Michel Hazanavicius	The Artist	Won	
2011	Woody Allen	Midnight in Paris	Nominated	
2012	David O. Russell	Silver Linings Playbook	Nominated	
2012	Steven Spielberg	Lincoln	Nominated	
2012	Benh Zeitlin	Beasts of the Southern Wild	Nominated	Zeitlin is of Russian-Jewish descent
2013	David O. Russell	American Hustle	Nominated	
2014	Bennett Miller	Foxcatcher	Nominated	
2015	Lenny Abrahamson	Room	Nominated	Abrahamson is of Irish-Jewish descent
2016	Kenneth Lonergan	Manchester by the Sea	Nominated	
2018	Paweł Pawlikowski	Cold War	Nominated	Jewish paternal grandmother
2019	Sam Mendes	1917	Nominated	
2019	Todd Phillips	Joker	Nominated	
2021	Steven Spielberg	West Side Story	Nominated	
2022	Steven Spielberg	The Fabelmans	Nominated	
2023	Jonathan Glazer	The Zone of Interest	Nominated	
2024	James Mangold	A Complete Unknown	Nominated	
2025	Josh Safdie	Marty Supreme	Nominated	

== Best Documentary Feature ==
Best Documentary Feature
Year	Name	Film	Status	Milestone / Notes
1942	William H. Pine	The Price of Victory	Nominated	
1942	Victor Stoloff	Little Isles of Freedom	Nominated	Shared with Edgar Loew
1947	Sid Rogell; Richard Fleischer	Design for Death	Won	Shared with Theron Warth
1948	Janice Loeb	The Quiet One	Nominated	
1950	Jack Arnold	With These Hands	Nominated	Shared with Lee Goodman
1952	Irwin Allen	The Sea Around Us	Won	
1952	Dore Schary	The Hoaxters	Nominated	
1952	Hall Bartlett	Navajo	Nominated	
1957	Lionel Rogosin	On the Bowery	Nominated	
1958	Nathan Zucker	Psychiatric Nursing	Nominated	
1961	Arthur Cohn	Sky Above and Mud Beneath	Won	Shared with Rene Lafuite
1963	Marshall Flaum	The Yanks Are Coming	Nominated	
1964	Mel Stuart	Four Days in November	Nominated	
1965	Sidney Glazier	The Eleanor Roosevelt Story	Won	
1965	Marshall Flaum	Let My People Go: The Story of Israel	Nominated	
1966	Haroun Tazieff	Le Volcan interdit	Nominated	Jewish mother
1967	Murray Lerner	Festival	Nominated	
1969	Irwin Rosten	The Wolf Men	Nominated	
1970	Jim Jacobs	Jack Johnson	Nominated	
1970	Ely Landau	King: A Filmed Record... Montgomery to Memphis	Nominated	
1971	Alan Landsburg	Alaska Wilderness Lake	Nominated	
1971	Marcel Ophuls	The Sorrow and the Pity	Nominated	
1972	Howard Smith	Marjoe	Won	Shared with Sarah Kernochan
1972	Arnold Perl; Marvin Worth	Malcolm X	Nominated	Posthumous nomination for Perl
1972	Laurence Merrick	Manson	Nominated	Shared with Robert Hendrickson
1974	Bert Schneider	Hearts and Minds	Won	Shared with Peter Davis
1974	Jill Godmilow	Antonia: A Portrait of the Woman	Nominated	Shared with Judy Collins
1974	Herbert Kline	The Challenge... A Tribute to Modern Art	Nominated	
1974	Haim Gouri	The 81st Blow	Nominated	Shared with Jacquot Ehrlich and David Bergman
1975	Irwin Rosten	Man: The Incredible Machine	Nominated	
1976	Barbara Kopple	Harlan County, USA	Won	
1976	David Koff	People of the Wind	Nominated	Shared with Anthony Howarth
1977	Robert Dornhelm	The Children of Theatre Street	Nominated	Shared with Earle Mack
1977	Harry Rasky	Homage to Chagall: The Colours of Love	Nominated	
1978	Arnold Shapiro	Scared Straight!	Won	
1978	Lyn Goldfarb	With Babies and Banners: Story of the Women's Emergency Brigade	Nominated	Shared with Anne Bohlen and Lorraine Gray
1979	Ira Wohl	Best Boy	Won	
1980	Murray Lerner	From Mao to Mozart: Isaac Stern in China	Won	
1980	Arthur Cohn	The Yellow Star: The Persecution of the Jews in Europe 1933–45	Nominated	Shared with Bengt von zur Mühlen
1981	Marvin Hier; Arnold Schwartzman	Genocide	Won	
1984	Rob Epstein	The Times of Harvey Milk	Won	Shared with Richard Schmiechen
1984	Charles Guggenheim	High Schools	Nominated	Shared with Nancy Sloss
1984	Zev Braun	Marlene	Nominated	Shared with Karel Dirka
1985	Susana Blaustein Muñoz	The Mothers of Plaza de Mayo	Nominated	Shared with Lourdes Portillo
1986	Kirk Simon; Amram Nowak	Isaac in America: A Journey with Isaac Bashevis Singer	Nominated	
1987	Aviva Slesin	The Ten-Year Lunch	Won	
1988	Marcel Ophuls	Hôtel Terminus: The Life and Times of Klaus Barbie	Won	
1988	Bruce Weber	Let's Get Lost	Nominated	Shared with Nan Bush
1989	Rob Epstein	Common Threads: Stories from the Quilt	Won	Shared with Bill Couturié
1990	Arthur Cohn; Barbara Kopple	American Dream	Won	
1990	Judith Montell	Forever Activists	Nominated	
1991	Irving Saraf	In the Shadow of the Stars	Won	Shared with Allie Light
1991	Hava Kohav Beller	The Restless Conscience: Resistance to Hitler Within Germany 1933-1945	Nominated	
1992	Nina Rosenblum	Liberators: Fighting on Two Fronts in World War II	Nominated	Shared with Bill Miles
1992	Roma Baran	Music for the Movies: Bernard Herrmann	Nominated	Shared with Margaret Smilow
1993	David Paperny; Arthur Ginsberg	The Broadcast Tapes of Dr. Peter	Nominated	
1994	Terry Sanders	Maya Lin: A Strong Clear Vision	Won	Shared with Freida Lee Mock
1994	Charles Guggenheim	D-Day Remembered	Nominated	
1994	Deborah Hoffmann	Complaints of a Dutiful Daughter	Nominated	
1994	Connie Field	Freedom on My Mind	Nominated	Shared with Marilyn Mulford
1995	Jon Blair	Anne Frank Remembered	Won	
1995	Walter Scheuer	Small Wonders	Nominated	Shared with Allan Miller
1995	Michael Tollin	Hank Aaron: Chasing the Dream	Nominated	Shared with Fredric Golding
1997	Marvin Hier	The Long Way Home	Won	Shared with Richard Trank
1997	Michèle Ohayon	Colors Straight Up	Nominated	Shared with Julia Schachter
1997	William Gazecki	Waco: The Rules of Engagement	Nominated	Shared with Dan Gifford
1998	Kenneth Lipper	The Last Days	Won	Shared with James Moll
1998	Matthew Diamond	Dancemaker	Nominated	Shared with Jerry Kupfer
1998	Liz Garbus	The Farm: Angola, USA	Nominated	Shared with Jonathan Stack
1998	Robert B. Weide	Lenny Bruce: Swear to Tell the Truth	Nominated	
1999	Arthur Cohn	One Day in September	Won	Shared with Kevin Macdonald
1999	Nanette Burstein	On the Ropes	Nominated	Shared with Brett Morgen
2000	Deborah Oppenheimer	Into the Arms of Strangers: Stories of the Kindertransport	Won	Shared with Mark Jonathan Harris
2000	Deborah Hoffmann	Long Night's Journey into Day	Nominated	Shared with Frances Reid
2001	Edet Belzberg	Children Underground	Nominated	
2001	Justine Shapiro	Promises	Nominated	Shared with B. Z. Goldberg
2002	Gail Dolgin	Daughter from Danang	Nominated	Shared with Vicente Franco
2002	Jeffrey Blitz	Spellbound	Nominated	Shared with Sean Welch
2003	Errol Morris	The Fog of War	Won	Shared with Michael Williams
2003	Andrew Jarecki	Capturing the Friedmans	Nominated	Shared with Marc Smerling
2003	Nathaniel Kahn	My Architect	Nominated	Shared with Susan R. Behr
2003	Bill Siegel	The Weather Underground	Nominated	Shared with Sam Green
2004	Zana Briski; Ross Kauffman	Born into Brothels	Won	
2004	Lauren Lazin	Tupac: Resurrection	Nominated	Shared with Karolyn Ali
2005	Henry Alex Rubin; Dana Adam Shapiro	Murderball	Nominated	
2006	Davis Guggenheim	An Inconvenient Truth	Won	
2006	Amy J. Berg	Deliver Us from Evil	Nominated	Shared with Frank Donner
2006	Rachel Grady	Jesus Camp	Nominated	Shared with Heidi Ewing
2007	Eva Orner	Taxi to the Dark Side	Won	Shared with Alex Gibney
2008	Tia Lessin	Trouble the Water	Nominated	Shared with Carl Deal
2009	Fisher Stevens	The Cove	Won	Shared with Louie Psihoyos
2009	Elise Pearlstein	Food, Inc.	Nominated	Shared with Robert Kenner
2010	Josh Fox	Gasland	Nominated	Shared with Trish Adlesic
2010	Sebastian Junger	Restrepo	Nominated	Shared with Tim Hetherington
2011	Joe Berlinger; Bruce Sinofsky	Paradise Lost 3: Purgatory	Nominated	
2012	Guy Davidi	5 Broken Cameras	Nominated	Shared with Emad Burnat
2012	Dror Moreh; Philippa Korwarsky; Estelle Fialon	The Gatekeepers	Nominated	
2012	Amy Ziering	The Invisible War	Nominated	Shared with Kirby Dick
2013	Gil Friesen	20 Feet from Stardom	Won	Posthumous win. Shared with Morgan Neville and Caitrin Rogers
2013	Joshua Oppenheimer	The Act of Killing	Nominated	Shared with Signe Byrge Sørensen
2014	Charlie Siskel	Finding Vivian Maier	Nominated	Shared with John Maloof
2015	Matthew Heineman; Tom Yellin	Cartel Land	Nominated	
2015	Joshua Oppenheimer	The Look of Silence	Nominated	Shared with Signe Byrge Sørensen
2015	Liz Garbus	What Happened, Miss Simone?	Nominated	Shared with Amy Hobby and Justin Wilkes
2016	Ezra Edelman	O.J.: Made in America	Won	Shared with Caroline Waterlow
2016	Howard Barish	13th	Nominated	Shared with Ava DuVernay and Spencer Averick
2017	Bryan Fogel	Icarus	Won	Shared with Dan Cogan
2020/2021	Pippa Ehrlich	My Octopus Teacher	Won	Shred with James Reed and Craig Foster
2022	Daniel Roher	Navalny	Won	Shared with Odessa Rae, Diane Becker, Melanie Miller, and Shane Boris
2022	Teddy Leifer	All That Breathes	Nominated	Shared with Shaunak Sen and Aman Mann
2022	Nan Goldin	All the Beauty and the Bloodshed	Nominated	Shared with Laura Poitras, Howard Gertler, John Lyons, and Yoni Golijov
2022	Ina Fichman	Fire of Love	Nominated	Shared with Sara Dosa and Shane Boris
2023	Raney Aronson-Rath	20 Days in Mariupol	Won	Shared with Mstyslav Chernov and Michelle Mizner
2023	John Battsek	Bobi Wine: The People's President	Nominated	Shared with Moses Bwayo and Christopher Sharp
2024	Rachel Szor; Yuval Abraham	No Other Land	Won	Shared with Basel Adra and Hamdan Ballal
2025	David Borenstein	Mr Nobody Against Putin	Won	Shared with Pavel Talankin, Helle Faber, and Alžběta Karásková
2025	Andrew Jarecki; Charlotte Kaufman	The Alabama Solution	Nominated	

== Best Documentary (Short Subject) ==
Best Documentary (Short Subject)
Year	Name	Film	Status	Milestone / Notes
1943	Walter Wanger	To the People of the United States	Nominated	
1951	Fred Zinnemann	Benjy	Won	
1954	Morrie Roizman	Rembrandt: A Self-Portrait	Nominated	
1955	Dore Schary	The Battle of Gettysburg	Nominated	
1956	Charles Guggenheim	A City Decides	Nominated	
1960	Altina Schinasi	George Grosz' Interregnum	Nominated	Schinasi was of Ottoman-Jewish descent. Shared with Charles Carey
1964	Charles Guggenheim	Nine from Little Rock	Won	
1964	Charles Guggenheim	Children Without	Nominated	
1966	Marin Karmitz	Adolescence	Nominated	Karmitz is of Romanian-Jewish descent. Shared with Vladimir Forgency
1967	Charles Guggenheim	Monument to the Dream	Nominated	
1968	Saul Bass	Why Man Creates	Won	
1968	Dan E. Weisburd	A Way Out of the Wilderness	Nominated	
1969	Denis Sanders	Czechoslovakia 1968	Won	Shared with Robert M. Fresco
1970	Joseph Strick	Interviews with My Lai Veterans	Won	
1971	Julian Krainin	Art Is...	Nominated	Shared with DeWitt Sage
1973	Julian Krainin	Princeton: A Search for Answers	Won	Shared with DeWitt Sage
1973	Louis Marcus	Children at Work	Nominated	
1973	Albert and David Maysles	Christo's Valley Curtain	Nominated	
1973	Terry Sanders	Four Stones for Kanemitsu	Nominated	Shared with June Wayne
1974	Robin Lehman	Don't	Won	
1975	Robin Lehman	The End of the Game	Won	Shared with Claire Wilbur
1975	Steven Kovacs	Arthur and Lillie	Nominated	Shared with Jon H. Else and Kristine Samuelson
1976	Barbara Myerhoff	Number Our Days	Won	Shared with Lynne Littman
1979	Saul J. Turell	Paul Robeson: Tribute to an Artist	Won	
1982	Charles Guggenheim	The Klan: A Legacy of Hate in America	Nominated	
1984	Roger Sherman	The Garden of Eden	Nominated	Shared with Lawrence R. Hott
1985	David H. Goodman	Witness to War: Dr. Charlie Clements	Won	
1985	Alan Edelstein	The Wizard of the Strings	Nominated	
1986	Aaron D. Weisblatt	Sam	Nominated	
1987	Sue Marx	Young at Heart	Won	Shared with Pamela Conn
1987	Izak Ben-Meir	In the Wee Wee Hours...	Nominated	Shared with Frank Daniel
1988	Karen Goodman	The Children's Storefront	Nominated	Shared with Werner Schumann
1989	Charles Guggenheim	The Johnstown Flood	Won	
1989	Ray Errol Fox	Yad Vashem: Preserving the Past to Ensure the Future	Nominated	
1990	Karen Goodman; Kirk Simon	Chimps: So Like Us	Nominated	
1990	Terry Sanders	Rose Kennedy: A Life to Remember	Nominated	Shared with Freida Lee Mock
1991	Debra Chasnoff	Deadly Deception: General Electric, Nuclear Weapons and Our Environment	Won	
1993	Margaret Lazarus	Defending Our Lives	Won	Shared with Renner Wunderlich
1993	Steven Cantor	Blood Ties: The Life and Work of Sally Mann	Nominated	Shared with Peter Spirer
1993	Elaine Holliman; Jason Schneider	Chicks in White Satin	Nominated	
1994	Charles Guggenheim	A Time for Justice	Won	
1994	Dee Mosbacher	Straight from the Heart	Nominated	Shared with Frances Reid
1995	Charles Guggenheim	The Shadow of Hate	Nominated	
1995	Terry Sanders	Never Give Up: The 20th Century Odyssey of Herbert Zipper	Nominated	Shared with Freida Lee Mock
1997	Mel Damski; Andrea Blaugrund Nevins	Still Kicking: The Fabulous Palm Springs Follies	Nominated	
1998	Charles Guggenheim	A Place in the Land	Nominated	
2000	Charles Braverman	Curtain Call	Nominated	Shared with Steve Kalafer
2001	Jessica Sanders	Sing!	Nominated	Shared with Freida Lee Mock
2002	Murray Nossel	Why Can't We Be a Family Again?	Nominated	Shared with Roger Weisberg
2005	Dan Krauss	The Death of Kevin Carter: Casualty of the Bang Bang Club	Nominated	
2006	Karen Goodman; Kirk Simon	Rehearsing a Dream	Nominated	
2006	Nathaniel Kahn	Two Hands: The Leon Fleisher Story	Nominated	Shared with Susan Rose Behr
2007	Vanessa Roth	Freeheld	Won	Shared with Cynthia Wade
2008	Irene Taylor Brodsky	The Final Inch	Nominated	Shared with Tom Grant
2009	Elinor Burkett	Music by Prudence	Won	Shared with Roger Ross Williams
2009	Jon Alpert	China's Unnatural Disaster: The Tears of Sichuan Province	Nominated	Shared with Matthew O'Neill
2010	Karen Goodman; Kirk Simon	Strangers No More	Won	
2011	Robin Fryday; Gail Dolgin	The Barber of Birmingham	Nominated	Posthumous nomination for Dolgin
2012	Jon Alpert	Redemption	Nominated	Shared with Matthew O'Neill
2013	Jason Cohen	Facing Fear	Nominated	
2015	Nomi Talisman	Last Day of Freedom	Nominated	Shared with Dee Hibbert-Jones
2016	Dan Krauss	Extremis	Nominated	
2016	Raphaela Neihausen; Kahane Cooperman	Joe's Violin	Nominated	
2017	Frank Stiefel	Heaven Is a Traffic Jam on the 405	Won	
2017	David Heilbroner	Traffic Stop	Nominated	Shared with Kate Davis
2018	Rob Epstein; Jeffrey Friedman	End Game	Nominated	
2021	Jon Shenk	Lead Me Home	Nominated	Shared with Pedro Kos
2021	Jay Rosenblatt	When We Were Bullies	Nominated	
2022	Jay Rosenblatt	How Do You Measure a Year?	Nominated	
2022	Beth Levison	The Martha Mitchell Effect	Nominated	Shared with Anne Alvergue
2022	Joshua Seftel	Stranger at the Gate	Nominated	Shared with Conall Jones
2023	Sheila Nevins	The ABCs of Book Banning	Nominated	Shared with Trish Adlesic
2024	Bill Morrison; Jamie Kalven	Incident	Nominated	
2025	Joshua Seftel	All the Empty Rooms	Won	Shared with Conall Jones
2025	Sheila Nevins; Hilla Medalia	Children No More: "Were and Are Gone"	Nominated	

== Best Film Editing ==
Best Film Editing
Year	Name	Film	Status	Milestone / Notes
1941	Harold F. Kress	Dr. Jekyll and Mr. Hyde	Nominated	
1941	Daniel Mandell	The Little Foxes	Nominated	
1942	Daniel Mandell	The Pride of the Yankees	Won	
1942	Harold F. Kress	Mrs. Miniver	Nominated	
1946	Daniel Mandell	The Best Years of Our Lives	Won	
1946	Harold F. Kress	The Yearling	Nominated	
1948	David Weisbart	Johnny Belinda	Nominated	
1951	Ralph E. Winters	Quo Vadis	Nominated	
1954	Ralph E. Winters	Seven Brides for Seven Brothers	Nominated	
1956	Albert Akst	Somebody Up There Likes Me	Nominated	
1957	Daniel Mandell	Witness for the Prosecution	Nominated	
1959	Ralph E. Winters	Ben-Hur	Won	Shared with John D. Dunning
1960	Daniel Mandell	The Apartment	Won	
1963	Harold F. Kress	How the West Was Won	Won	
1965	Ralph E. Winters	The Great Race	Nominated	
1971	Gerald B. Greenberg	The French Connection	Won	
1971	Ralph E. Winters	Kotch	Nominated	
1972	Peter Zinner	The Godfather	Nominated	Shared with William H. Reynolds
1972	Harold F. Kress	The Poseidon Adventure	Nominated	
1974	Harold F. Kress; Carl Kress	The Towering Inferno	Won	
1977	Paul Hirsch	Star Wars	Won	Shared with Marcia Lucas and Richard Chew
1977	Michael Kahn	Close Encounters of the Third Kind	Nominated	
1978	Peter Zinner	The Deer Hunter	Won	
1979	Gerald B. Greenberg	Apocalypse Now	Nominated	
1979	Gerald B. Greenberg; Lisa Fruchtman	Kramer vs. Kramer	Nominated	Shared with Richard Marks and Walter Murch
1981	Michael Kahn	Raiders of the Lost Ark	Won	
1982	Peter Zinner	An Officer and a Gentleman	Nominated	
1983	Lisa Fruchtman	The Right Stuff	Won	Shared with Glenn Farr, Stephen A. Rotter, Douglas Stewart, and Tom Rolf
1983	Edward M. Abroms	Blue Thunder	Nominated	Shared with Frank Morriss
1984	Barry Malkin	The Cotton Club	Nominated	Shared with Robert Q. Lovett
1985	Rudi Fehr; Kaja Fehr	Prizzi's Honor	Nominated	
1987	Michael Kahn	Empire of the Sun	Nominated	
1987	Michael Kahn	Fatal Attraction	Nominated	Shared with Peter E. Berger
1989	Steven Rosenblum	Glory	Nominated	
1990	Barry Malkin; Lisa Fruchtman	The Godfather Part III	Nominated	Shared with Walter Murch
1991	Mark Goldblatt	Terminator 2: Judgment Day	Nominated	Shared with Conrad Buff IV and Richard A. Harris
1993	Michael Kahn	Schindler's List	Won	
1994	Frederick Marx	Hoop Dreams	Nominated	Shared with Steve James and William Haugse
1995	Jay Friedkin	Babe	Nominated	Shared with Marcus D'Arcy
1995	Steven Rosenblum	Braveheart	Nominated	
1996	Roderick Jaynes	Fargo	Nominated	
1998	Michael Kahn	Saving Private Ryan	Won	
1998	Saar Klein	The Thin Red Line	Nominated	Shared with Billy Weber and Leslie Jones
1999	Zach Staenberg	The Matrix	Won	
1999	Tariq Anwar	American Beauty	Nominated	Shared with Christopher Greenbury
1999	William Goldenberg; Paul Rubell; David Rosenbloom	The Insider	Nominated	
2000	Saar Klein	Almost Famous	Nominated	Shared with Joe Hutshing
2003	William Goldenberg	Seabiscuit	Nominated	
2004	Paul Rubell	Collateral	Nominated	Shared with Jim Miller
2004	Paul Hirsch	Ray	Nominated	
2005	Michael Kahn	Munich	Nominated	
2006	Steven Rosenblum	Blood Diamond	Nominated	
2007	Roderick Jaynes	No Country for Old Men	Nominated	
2009	Stephen E. Rivkin	Avatar	Nominated	Shared with James Cameron and John Refoua
2010	Tariq Anwar	The King's Speech	Nominated	
2011	Michel Hazanavicius	The Artist	Nominated	Shared with Anne-Sophie Bion
2011	Andrew Weisblum	Black Swan	Nominated	
2012	William Goldenberg	Argo	Won	
2012	William Goldenberg	Zero Dark Thirty	Nominated	Shared with Dylan Tichenor
2012	Michael Kahn	Lincoln	Nominated	
2014	Sandra Adair	Boyhood	Nominated	
2014	William Goldenberg	The Imitation Game	Nominated	
2017	Tatiana S. Riegel	I, Tonya	Nominated	
2017	Sidney Wolinsky	The Shape of Water	Nominated	
2018	John Ottman	Bohemian Rhapsody	Won	Ottman is of Russian-Jewish descent.
2021	Andrew Weisblum; Myron Kerstein	tick, tick... BOOM!	Nominated	
2024	Myron Kerstein	Wicked	Nominated	
2025	Ronald Bronstein; Josh Safdie	Marty Supreme	Nominated	

== Best International Feature Film ==
The Academy Award for Best International Feature Film is awarded to countries, not individuals. This list contains Jewish directors of nominated films, who typically accept the award on behalf of their country.

Best International Feature Film
Year	Name	Film	Country	Status	Milestone / Notes
1957	Robert Siodmak	The Devil Strikes at Night	(West Germany)	Nominated	
1960	Gillo Pontecorvo	Kapo	(Italy)	Nominated	
1963	Roman Polanski	Knife in the Water	(Poland)	Nominated	
1964	Ephraim Kishon	Sallah Shabati	(Israel)	Nominated	
1965	Ján Kadár	The Shop on Main Street	(Czechoslovakia)	Won	Shared with Elmar Klos
1966	Claude Lelouch	A Man and a Woman	(France)	Won	
1966	Gillo Pontecorvo	The Battle of Algiers	(Italy)	Nominated	
1966	Miloš Forman	Loves of a Blonde	(Czechoslovakia)	Nominated	
1967	Claude Lelouch	Live for Life	(France)	Nominated	
1968	Miloš Forman	The Firemen's Ball	(Czechoslovakia)	Nominated	
1971	Ephraim Kishon	The Policeman	(Israel)	Nominated	
1972	Moshé Mizrahi	I Love You Rosa	(Israel)	Nominated	
1973	Moshé Mizrahi	The House on Chelouche Street	(Israel)	Nominated	
1974	Jerzy Hoffman	The Deluge	(Poland)	Nominated	
1974	Sergio Renán	The Truce	(Argentina)	Nominated	
1977	Moshé Mizrahi	Madame Rosa	(France)	Won	
1977	Menahem Golan	Operation Thunderbolt	(Israel)	Nominated	
1980	István Szabó	Bizalom	(Hungary)	Nominated	
1981	István Szabó	Mephisto	(Hungary)	Won	
1982	Yuli Raizman	Private Life	(Soviet Union)	Nominated	
1983	Diane Kurys	Entre Nous	(France)	Nominated	
1984	Uri Barbash	Beyond the Walls	(Israel)	Nominated	
1984	Pyotr Todorovsky	Wartime Romance	(Soviet Union)	Nominated	
1985	Agnieszka Holland	Angry Harvest	(West Germany)	Nominated	
1985	István Szabó	Colonel Redl	(Hungary)	Nominated	
1988	István Szabó	Hanussen	(Hungary)	Nominated	
2000	Agnès Jaoui	The Taste of Others	(France)	Nominated	
2006	Susanne Bier	After the Wedding	(Denmark)	Nominated	
2007	Joseph Cedar	Beaufort	(Israel)	Nominated	
2008	Ari Folman	Waltz with Bashir	(Israel)	Nominated	
2009	Yaron Shani	Ajami	(Israel)	Nominated	Shared with Scandar Copti
2010	Susanne Bier	In a Better World	(Denmark)	Won	
2011	Joseph Cedar	Footnote	(Israel)	Nominated	
2011	Agnieszka Holland	In Darkness	(Poland)	Nominated	
2014	Paweł Pawlikowski	Ida	(Poland)	Won	Jewish paternal grandmother
2014	Damián Szifron	Wild Tales	(Argentina)	Nominated	
2015	László Nemes	Son of Saul	(Hungary)	Won	
2018	Paweł Pawlikowski	Cold War	(Poland)	Nominated	
2023	Jonathan Glazer	The Zone of Interest	(United Kingdom)	Won	

== Best Makeup and Hairstyling ==
Best Makeup and Hairstyling
Year	Name	Film	Status	Milestone / Notes
1981	Stan Winston	Heartbeeps	Nominated	
1988	Thomas R. Burman; Bari Dreiband-Burman	Scrooged	Nominated	
1990	Stan Winston	Edward Scissorhands	Nominated	Shared with Ve Neill
1991	Stan Winston	Terminator 2: Judgment Day	Won	Shared with Jeff Dawn
1992	Stan Winston	Bram Stoker's Dracula	Nominated	Shared with Ve Neill and Ronnie Specter
2005	Howard Berger	The Chronicles of Narnia: The Lion, the Witch and the Wardrobe	Won	Shared with Tami Lane
2009	Barney Burman	Star Trek	Won	Shared with Mindy Hall and Joel Harlow
2012	Howard Berger	Hitchcock	Nominated	Shared with Peter Montagna and Martin Samuel

== Best Music, Original Score ==
Best Music, Original Score
Year	Name	Film	Status	Milestone / Notes
1934	Louis Silvers	One Night of Love	Won	
1934	Max Steiner	The Lost Patrol	Nominated	
1934	Max Steiner	The Gay Divorcee	Nominated	
1935	Max Steiner	The Informer	Won	
1935	Leo F. Forbstein E.W. Korngold	Captain Blood	Nominated	Write-in nomination
1935	Nat W. Finston	Mutiny on the Bounty	Nominated	
1935	Irvin Talbot	Peter Ibbetson	Nominated	
1936	E.W. Korngold Leo F. Forbstein	Anthony Adverse	Won	
1936	E.W. Korngold Leo F. Forbstein	The Charge of the Light Brigade	Nominated	
1936	Max Steiner	The Garden of Allah	Nominated	
1936	Nathaniel Shilkret	Winterset	Nominated	
1936	Boris Morros	The General Died at Dawn	Nominated	
1937	Alfred Newman	The Hurricane	Nominated	
1937	Alfred Newman	The Prisoner of Zenda	Nominated	
1937	Charles Previn	One Hundred Men and a Girl	Won	
1937	Hugo Riesenfeld	Make a Wish	Nominated	
1937	Louis Silvers	In Old Chicago	Nominated	
1937	Leo F. Forbstein	The Life of Emile Zola	Nominated	
1937	Nat W. Finston	Maytime	Nominated	
1937	Boris Morros	Souls at Sea	Nominated	
1937	Morris Stoloff	Lost Horizon	Nominated	
1938	Erich Wolfgang Korngold	The Adventures of Robin Hood	Won	
1938	Alfred Newman	Alexander's Ragtime Band	Won	Scoring
1938	Alfred Newman	The Goldwyn Follies	Nominated	
1938	Alfred Newman	The Cowboy and the Lady	Nominated	
1938	Max Steiner	Jezebel	Nominated	
1938	Franz Waxman	The Young in Heart	Nominated	
1938	Victor Young	Army Girl	Nominated	
1938	Victor Young	Breaking the Ice	Nominated	
1938	Charles Previn	Mad About Music	Nominated	Shared with Frank Skinner
1938	Louis Silvers	Suez	Nominated	
1938	Boris Morros	Tropic Holiday	Nominated	
1938	Morris Stoloff	Girls' School	Nominated	Shared with Gregory Stone
1938	Werner Janssen	Blockade	Nominated	
1938	Cy Feuer	Storm Over Bengal	Nominated	
1939	Leo Shuken	Stagecoach	Won	Scoring. Shared with Richard Hageman, W. Franke Harling, and John Leipold
1939	Aaron Copland	Of Mice and Men	Nominated	Scoring of a Dramatic or Comedy Picture
1939	Alfred Newman	The Hunchback of Notre Dame	Nominated	Scoring
1939	Alfred Newman	They Shall Have Music	Nominated	
1939	Alfred Newman	The Rains Came	Nominated	
1939	Alfred Newman	Wuthering Heights	Nominated	
1939	Max Steiner	Dark Victory	Nominated	
1939	Max Steiner	Gone with the Wind	Nominated	
1939	Victor Young	Golden Boy	Nominated	
1939	Victor Young	Gulliver's Travels	Nominated	
1939	Victor Young	Man of Conquest	Nominated	
1939	Victor Young	Way Down South	Nominated	
1939	Charles Previn	First Love	Nominated	
1939	Dimitri Tiomkin	Mr. Smith Goes to Washington	Nominated	
1939	Erich Wolfgang Korngold	The Private Lives of Elizabeth and Essex	Nominated	
1939	Louis Silvers	Swanee River	Nominated	
1939	Werner Janssen	Eternally Yours	Nominated	
1939	Cy Feuer	She Married a Cop	Nominated	
1939	Lud Gluskin	The Man in the Iron Mask	Nominated	Shared with Lucien Moraweck
1939	Louis Forbes	Intermezzo	Nominated	
1939	Georgie Stoll	Babes in Arms	Nominated	Shared with Roger Edens
1940	Aaron Copland	Our Town	Nominated	Scoring of a Dramatic or Comedy Picture
1940	Erich Wolfgang Korngold	The Sea Hawk	Nominated	
1940	Alfred Newman	Tin Pan Alley	Won	Scoring
1940	Alfred Newman	The Mark of Zorro	Nominated	
1940	Max Steiner	The Letter	Nominated	
1940	Franz Waxman	Rebecca	Nominated	
1940	Victor Young	Arizona	Nominated	
1940	Victor Young	Dark Command	Nominated	
1940	Victor Young	North West Mounted Police	Nominated	
1940	Victor Young	Arise, My Love	Nominated	
1940	Louis Gruenberg	The Fight for Life	Nominated	
1940	Werner Heymann	One Million B.C.	Nominated	
1940	Miklós Rózsa	The Thief of Bagdad	Nominated	
1940	Artie Shaw	Second Chorus	Nominated	
1940	Charles Previn	Spring Parade	Nominated	
1940	Cy Feuer	Hit Parade of 1941	Nominated	
1940	Georgie Stoll	Strike Up the Band	Nominated	Shared with Roger Edens
1941	Bernard Herrmann	The Devil and Daniel Webster	Won	Scoring of a Dramatic or Comedy Picture
1941	Bernard Herrmann	Citizen Kane	Nominated	
1941	Alfred Newman	Ball of Fire	Nominated	Scoring of a Dramatic or Comedy Picture
1941	Alfred Newman	How Green Was My Valley	Nominated	
1941	Max Steiner	Sergeant York	Nominated	
1941	Franz Waxman	Dr. Jekyll and Mr. Hyde	Nominated	
1941	Franz Waxman	Suspicion	Nominated	
1941	Victor Young	Hold Back the Dawn	Nominated	
1941	Morris Stoloff; Ernst Toch	Ladies in Retirement	Nominated	
1941	Miklós Rózsa	Lydia	Nominated	
1941	Walter Scharf; Cy Feuer	Mercy Island	Nominated	
1941	Louis Gruenberg	So Ends Our Night	Nominated	
1941	Werner Heymann	That Uncertain Feeling	Nominated	
1941	Charles Previn	Buck Privates	Nominated	
1941	Emil Newman	Sun Valley Serenade	Nominated	
1941	Cy Feuer	Ice-Capades	Nominated	
1941	Bronisław Kaper	The Chocolate Soldier	Nominated	Shared with Herbert Stothart
1941	Morris Stoloff	You'll Never Get Rich	Nominated	
1942	Morris Stoloff; Friedrich Hollaender	The Talk of the Town	Nominated	
1942	Alfred Newman	The Black Swan	Nominated	Scoring of a Dramatic or Comedy Picture
1942	Alfred Newman	My Gal Sal	Nominated	Scoring of a Musical Picture
1942	Max Steiner	Now, Voyager	Won	Scoring of a Dramatic or Comedy Picture
1942	Dimitri Tiomkin	The Corsican Brothers	Nominated	
1942	Victor Young	Flying Tigers	Nominated	
1942	Victor Young	Silver Queen	Nominated	
1942	Victor Young	Take a Letter, Darling	Nominated	
1942	Miklós Rózsa	Rudyard Kipling's Jungle Book	Nominated	
1942	Werner Heymann	To Be or Not to Be	Nominated	
1942	Hans J. Salter; Charles Previn	It Started with Eve	Nominated	
1942	Walter Scharf	Johnny Doughboy	Nominated	
1942	Georgie Stoll	For Me and My Gal	Nominated	Shared with Roger Edens
1942	Ray Heindorf	Yankee Doodle Dandy	Won	Musical Picture. Shared with Heinz Roemheld
1943	Aaron Copland	The North Star	Nominated	
1943	Hanns Eisler	Hangmen Also Die!	Nominated	
1943	Alfred Newman	Coney Island	Nominated	Scoring of a Musical Picture
1943	Alfred Newman	The Song of Bernadette	Won	Scoring of a Dramatic or Comedy Picture
1943	Max Steiner	Casablanca	Nominated	Scoring of a Dramatic or Comedy Picture
1943	Hans J. Salter	The Amazing Mrs. Holliday	Nominated	Shared with Frank Skinner
1943	Louis Gruenberg; Morris Stoloff	Commandos Strike at Dawn	Nominated	
1943	Victor Young	For Whom the Bell Tolls	Nominated	
1943	Walter Scharf	In Old Oklahoma	Nominated	
1943	Walter Scharf	Hit Parade of 1943	Nominated	
1943	Dimitri Tiomkin	The Moon and Sixpence	Nominated	
1943	Ray Heindorf	This Is the Army	Won	Musical Picture
1943	Morris Stoloff	Something to Shout About	Nominated	
1944	Hanns Eisler	None but the Lonely Heart	Nominated	Shared with Constantin Bakaleinikoff
1944	Alfred Newman	Irish Eyes Are Smiling	Nominated	Scoring of a Musical Picture
1944	Alfred Newman	Wilson	Nominated	Scoring of a Dramatic or Comedy Picture
1944	Max Steiner	Since You Went Away	Won	Scoring of a Dramatic or Comedy Picture
1944	Max Steiner	The Adventures of Mark Twain	Nominated	
1944	Kurt Weill; Werner Heymann	Knickerbocker Holiday	Nominated	
1944	Morris Stoloff; Ernst Toch	Address Unknown	Nominated	
1944	Dimitri Tiomkin	The Bridge of San Luis Rey	Nominated	
1944	Hans J. Salter	Christmas Holiday	Nominated	
1944	Hans J. Salter	The Merry Monahans	Nominated	
1944	Miklós Rózsa	Double Indemnity	Nominated	
1944	Miklós Rózsa	The Woman of the Town	Nominated	
1944	Walter Scharf	The Fighting Seabees	Nominated	Shared with Roy Webb
1944	Walter Scharf	Brazil	Nominated	
1944	Michel Michelet	The Hairy Ape	Nominated	Shared with Edward Paul
1944	Michel Michelet	Voice in the Wind	Nominated	
1944	David Rose	The Princess and the Pirate	Nominated	
1944	Charles Previn	Song of the Open Road	Nominated	
1944	Morris Stoloff	Cover Girl	Won	Scoring of a Musical Picture. Shared with Carmen Dragon
1944	Fred Rich	Jack London	Nominated	
1944	Louis Forbes; Ray Heindorf	Up in Arms	Nominated	
1944	Georgie Stoll	Meet Me in St. Louis	Nominated	
1944	Ray Heindorf	Hollywood Canteen	Nominated	
1945	Alfred Newman	The Keys of the Kingdom	Nominated	
1945	Alfred Newman	State Fair	Nominated	Shared with Charles Henderson
1945	Max Steiner	Rhapsody in Blue	Nominated	
1945	Alexandre Tansman	Paris Underground	Nominated	Scoring of a Dramatic or Comedy Picture
1945	Franz Waxman	Objective, Burma!	Nominated	
1945	Miklós Rózsa	Spellbound	Won	Dramatic or Comedy Picture
1945	Miklós Rózsa	The Lost Weekend	Nominated	
1945	Miklós Rózsa; Morris Stoloff	A Song to Remember	Nominated	
1945	Louis Applebaum; Ann Ronell	The Story of G.I. Joe	Nominated	
1945	Victor Young	Love Letters	Nominated	
1945	Hans J. Salter	This Love of Ours	Nominated	
1945	Hans J. Salter; Jerome Kern	Can't Help Singing	Nominated	Posthumous nomination for Kern
1945	Max Steiner; Ray Heindorf	Rhapsody in Blue	Nominated	
1945	Morris Stoloff	Tonight and Every Night	Nominated	Shared with Marlin Skiles
1945	Werner Janssen	Captain Kidd	Nominated	
1945	Werner Janssen	Guest in the House	Nominated	
1945	Werner Janssen	The Southerner	Nominated	
1945	Louis Forbes; Ray Heindorf	Wonder Man	Nominated	
1945	Georgie Stoll	Anchors Aweigh	Won	Musical Picture
1946	Alfred Newman	Centennial Summer	Nominated	
1946	Max Steiner; Ray Heindorf	Night and Day	Nominated	
1946	Franz Waxman	Humoresque	Nominated	
1946	Bernard Herrmann	Anna and the King of Siam	Nominated	
1946	Miklós Rózsa	The Killers	Nominated	
1946	Lennie Hayton	The Harvey Girls	Nominated	
1946	Morris Stoloff	The Jolson Story	Won	Scoring of a Musical Picture
1947	Alfred Newman	Captain from Castile	Nominated	
1947	Alfred Newman	Mother Wore Tights	Won	
1947	Max Steiner	Life with Father	Nominated	
1947	Max Steiner; Ray Heindorf	My Wild Irish Rose	Nominated	
1947	Miklós Rózsa	A Double Life	Won	
1947	David Raksin	Forever Amber	Nominated	
1947	Johnny Green	Fiesta	Nominated	
1948	Johnny Green	Easter Parade	Won	Scoring of a Musical Picture. Shared with Roger Edens
1948	Alfred Newman	The Snake Pit	Nominated	
1948	Alfred Newman	When My Baby Smiles at Me	Nominated	
1948	Max Steiner	Johnny Belinda	Nominated	
1948	Victor Young	The Emperor Waltz	Nominated	
1948	Lennie Hayton	The Pirate	Nominated	
1948	Ray Heindorf	Romance on the High Seas	Nominated	
1949	Aaron Copland	The Heiress	Won	Scoring of a Dramatic or Comedy Picture
1949	Lennie Hayton	On the Town	Won	Scoring of a Musical Picture. Shared with Roger Edens.
1949	Max Steiner	Beyond the Forest	Nominated	
1949	Dimitri Tiomkin	Champion	Nominated	
1949	Morris Stoloff	Jolson Sings Again	Nominated	
1949	Ray Heindorf	Look for the Silver Lining	Nominated	
1950	Alfred Newman	All About Eve	Nominated	
1950	Max Steiner	The Flame and the Arrow	Nominated	
1950	Franz Waxman	Sunset Boulevard	Won	Scoring of a Dramatic or Comedy Picture
1950	Victor Young	Samson and Delilah	Nominated	
1950	Lionel Newman	I'll Get By	Nominated	
1950	André Previn	Three Little Words	Nominated	
1950	Adolph Deutsch	Annie Get Your Gun	Won	Scoring of a Musical Picture. Shared with Roger Edens
1950	Ray Heindorf	The West Point Story	Nominated	
1951	Alfred Newman	David and Bathsheba	Nominated	
1951	Alfred Newman	On the Riviera	Nominated	
1951	Franz Waxman	A Place in the Sun	Won	Scoring of a Dramatic or Comedy Picture
1951	Alex North	Death of a Salesman	Nominated	
1951	Alex North	A Streetcar Named Desire	Nominated	
1951	Miklós Rózsa	Quo Vadis	Nominated	
1951	Saul Chaplin; Johnny Green	An American in Paris	Won	Scoring of a Musical Picture
1951	Peter Herman Adler; Johnny Green	The Great Caruso	Nominated	
1951	Adolph Deutsch; Conrad Salinger	Show Boat	Nominated	
1952	Max Steiner; Ray Heindorf	The Jazz Singer	Nominated	
1952	Max Steiner	The Miracle of Our Lady of Fatima	Nominated	
1952	Dimitri Tiomkin	High Noon	Won	Scoring of a Dramatic or Comedy Picture
1952	Alfred Newman	With a Song in My Heart	Won	Scoring of a Musical Picture
1952	Miklós Rózsa	Ivanhoe	Nominated	
1952	Walter Scharf	Hans Christian Andersen	Nominated	
1952	Lennie Hayton	Singin' in the Rain	Nominated	
1952	Herschel Burke Gilbert	The Thief	Nominated	
1952	Alex North	Viva Zapata!	Nominated	
1953	Friedrich Hollaender; Morris Stoloff	The 5,000 Fingers of Dr. T.	Nominated	
1953	Alfred Newman	Call Me Madam	Won	Scoring of a Musical Picture.
1953	Miklós Rózsa	Julius Caesar	Nominated	
1953	André Previn; Saul Chaplin	Kiss Me Kate	Nominated	
1953	Morris Stoloff	From Here to Eternity	Nominated	Shared with George Duning
1953	Bronisław Kaper	Lili	Won	Music Score of a Dramatic or Comedy Picture
1953	Adolph Deutsch	The Band Wagon	Nominated	
1953	Louis Forbes	This Is Cinerama	Nominated	
1953	Ray Heindorf	Calamity Jane	Nominated	
1954	Leonard Bernstein	On the Waterfront	Nominated	
1954	Alfred Newman; Lionel Newman	There's No Business Like Show Business	Nominated	
1954	Max Steiner	The Caine Mutiny	Nominated	
1954	Dimitri Tiomkin	The High and the Mighty	Won	Scoring of a Dramatic or Comedy Picture
1954	Franz Waxman	The Silver Chalice	Nominated	
1954	Larry Adler	Genevieve	Nominated	
1954	Saul Chaplin; Adolph Deutsch	Seven Brides for Seven Brothers	Won	Scoring of a Musical Picture
1954	Herschel Burke Gilbert	Carmen Jones	Nominated	
1954	Joseph Gershenson	The Glenn Miller Story	Nominated	Shared with Henry Mancini
1954	Ray Heindorf	A Star Is Born	Nominated	
1955	Percy Faith; Georgie Stoll	Love Me or Leave Me	Nominated	
1955	Alfred Newman	Daddy Long Legs	Nominated	
1955	Alfred Newman	Love is a Many-Splendored Thing	Won	Scoring of a Dramatic or Comedy Picture
1955	Max Steiner	Battle Cry	Nominated	
1955	Elmer Bernstein	The Man with the Golden Arm	Nominated	
1955	Alex North	The Rose Tattoo	Nominated	
1955	André Previn	It's Always Fair Weather	Nominated	
1955	Adolph Deutsch; Jay Blackton	Oklahoma!	Won	Scoring of a Musical Picture. Shared with Robert Russell Bennett
1955	Jay Blackton	Guys and Dolls	Nominated	Shared with Cyril J. Mockridge
1956	Alfred Newman	Anastasia	Nominated	
1956	Alfred Newman	The King and I	Won	Scoring of a Musical Picture. Shared with Ken Darby.
1956	Victor Young	Around the World in 80 Days	Won	Scoring of a Dramatic or Comedy Picture. Posthumous win.
1956	Dimitri Tiomkin	Giant	Nominated	
1956	Alex North	The Rainmaker	Nominated	
1956	Lionel Newman	The Best Things in Life Are Free	Nominated	
1956	Saul Chaplin; Johnny Green	High Society	Nominated	
1956	Morris Stoloff	The Eddy Duchin Story	Nominated	Shared with George Duning
1956	Johnny Green; Georgie Stoll	Meet Me in Las Vegas	Nominated	
1957	Johnny Green	Raintree County	Nominated	
1958	Alfred Newman	South Pacific	Nominated	Scoring of a Musical Picture. Shared with Ken Darby.
1958	Dimitri Tiomkin	The Old Man and the Sea	Won	Scoring of a Dramatic or Comedy Picture
1958	André Previn	Gigi	Won	
1958	Jerome Moross	The Big Country	Nominated	
1958	David Raksin	Separate Tables	Nominated	
1958	Yuri Fayer	The Bolshoi Ballet	Nominated	Shared with Gennady Rozhdestvensky
1958	Lionel Newman	Mardi Gras	Nominated	
1958	Ray Heindorf	Damn Yankees	Nominated	
1959	Alfred Newman	The Diary of Anne Frank	Nominated	Scoring of a Dramatic or Comedy Picture
1959	André Previn	Porgy and Bess	Won	Scoring of a Musical Picture. Shared with Ken Darby.
1959	Franz Waxman	The Nun's Story	Nominated	
1959	Miklós Rózsa	Ben-Hur	Won	Scoring of a Dramatic or Comedy Picture
1959	Ernest Gold	On the Beach	Nominated	
1959	Lionel Newman	Say One for Me	Nominated	
1959	Nelson Riddle	Li'l Abner	Nominated	Shared with Joseph J. Lilley
1960	Ernest Gold	Exodus	Won	
1960	Dimitri Tiomkin	The Alamo	Nominated	
1960	André Previn	Elmer Gantry	Nominated	
1960	André Previn	Bells Are Ringing	Nominated	Shared with Red Mitchell
1960	Elmer Bernstein	The Magnificent Seven	Nominated	
1960	Alex North	Spartacus	Nominated	
1960	Lionel Newman	Let's Make Love	Nominated	Shared with Earle Hagen
1960	Morris Stoloff; Harry Sukman	Song Without End	Won	Scoring of a Musical Picture.
1960	Nelson Riddle	Can-Can	Nominated	
1960	Johnny Green	Pepe	Nominated	
1961	Irwin Kostal; Sid Ramin; Saul Chaplin; Johnny Green	West Side Story	Won	Scoring of a Musical Picture
1961	Alfred Newman	Flower Drum Song	Nominated	Shared with Ken Darby.
1961	Miklós Rózsa	El Cid	Nominated	
1961	Dimitri Tiomkin	The Guns of Navarone	Nominated	
1961	Elmer Bernstein	Summer and Smoke	Nominated	
1961	Morris Stoloff; Harry Sukman	Fanny	Nominated	
1962	Ray Heindorf	The Music Man	Won	Scoring of Music — Adaptation or Treatment
1962	Bronisław Kaper	Mutiny on the Bounty	Nominated	
1962	Jerry Goldsmith	Freud: The Secret Passion	Nominated	
1962	Franz Waxman	Taras Bulba	Nominated	
1962	Elmer Bernstein	To Kill a Mockingbird	Nominated	
1962	Georgie Stoll	Billy Rose's Jumbo	Nominated	
1963	Dimitri Tiomkin	55 Days at Peking	Nominated	
1963	Alex North	Cleopatra	Nominated	
1963	Alfred Newman	How the West Was Won	Nominated	Shared with Ken Darby.
1963	Ernest Gold	It's a Mad, Mad, Mad, Mad World	Nominated	
1963	André Previn	Irma La Douce	Won	Scoring of Music, Adaptation or Treatment.
1963	Johnny Green	Bye Bye Birdie	Nominated	
1964	André Previn	My Fair Lady	Won	Scoring of Music, Adaptation or Treatment.
1964	Dimitri Tiomkin	The Fall of the Roman Empire	Nominated	
1964	Leo Shuken; Jack Elliott	The Unsinkable Molly Brown	Nominated	Shared with Robert Armbruster, Leo Arnaud, Jack Hayes, and Calvin Jackson
1964	Nelson Riddle	Robin and the 7 Hoods	Nominated	
1964	Laurence Rosenthal	Becket	Nominated	
1964	Sherman Brothers	Mary Poppins	Won	Substantially Original Score
1964	Irwin Kostal	Mary Poppins	Nominated	Scoring of Music, Adaptation or Treatment
1965	Irwin Kostal	The Sound of Music	Won	Scoring of Music, Adaptation or Treatment
1965	Alfred Newman	The Greatest Story Ever Told	Nominated	Substantially Original Score
1965	Alex North	The Agony and the Ecstasy	Nominated	
1965	Jerry Goldsmith	A Patch of Blue	Nominated	
1965	Lionel Newman	The Pleasure Seekers	Nominated	Shared with Alexander Courage
1966	Luis Enríquez Bacalov	Il vangelo secondo Matteo	Nominated	Scoring of Music, Adaptation or Treatment
1966	Elmer Bernstein	Hawaii	Nominated	
1966	Elmer Bernstein	Return of the Seven	Nominated	
1966	Jerry Goldsmith	The Sand Pebbles	Nominated	
1966	Alex North	Who's Afraid of Virginia Woolf?	Nominated	
1966	Harry Sukman	The Singing Nun	Nominated	
1967	Elmer Bernstein	Thoroughly Modern Millie	Won	
1967	Alfred Newman	Camelot	Won	Scoring of Music, Adaptation or Treatment
1967	Lionel Newman	Doctor Dolittle	Nominated	
1967	André Previn; Joseph Gershenson	Thoroughly Modern Millie	Nominated	
1967	Lalo Schifrin	Cool Hand Luke	Nominated	
1968	Lalo Schifrin	The Fox	Nominated	Original Score for a Motion Picture (not a Musical).
1968	Johnny Green	Oliver!	Won	Scoring of a Musical Picture
1968	Jerry Goldsmith	Planet of the Apes	Nominated	
1968	Alex North	The Shoes of the Fisherman	Nominated	
1968	Walter Scharf	Funny Girl	Nominated	
1968	Lennie Hayton	Star!	Nominated	
1968	Ray Heindorf	Finian's Rainbow	Nominated	
1969	Burt Bacharach	Butch Cassidy and the Sundance Kid	Won	Original Score for a Motion Picture (not a Musical).
1969	Ernest Gold	The Secret of Santa Vittoria	Nominated	
1969	Jerry Fielding	The Wild Bunch	Nominated	
1969	Lionel Newman; Lennie Hayton	Hello, Dolly!	Won	Scoring of Music, Adaptation or Treatment
1969	Cy Coleman	Sweet Charity	Nominated	
1969	Nelson Riddle	Paint Your Wagon	Nominated	
1969	Johnny Green	They Shoot Horses, Don't They?	Nominated	Shared with Albert Woodbury
1970	Alfred Newman	Airport	Nominated	Posthumous nomination.
1970	Jerry Goldsmith	Patton	Nominated	
1971	Jerry Fielding	Straw Dogs	Nominated	
1971	Irwin Kostal; Sherman Brothers	Bedknobs and Broomsticks	Nominated	Scoring Original Song Score and/or Adaptation
1971	Dimitri Tiomkin	Tchaikovsky	Nominated	
1971	Anthony Newley; Walter Scharf	Willy Wonka & the Chocolate Factory	Nominated	Shared with Leslie Bricusse
1972	Laurence Rosenthal	Man of La Mancha	Nominated	
1973	Marvin Hamlisch	The Way We Were	Won	Dramatic Score
1973	Marvin Hamlisch	The Sting	Won	Scoring Original Song Score and/or Adaptation
1973	Jerry Goldsmith	Papillon	Nominated	
1973	André Previn	Jesus Christ Superstar	Nominated	Shared with Herbert W. Spencer and Andrew Lloyd Webber
1973	Sherman Brothers	Tom Sawyer	Nominated	Shared with John Williams
1974	Jerry Goldsmith	Chinatown	Nominated	
1974	Alex North	Shanks	Nominated	
1974	Nelson Riddle	The Great Gatsby	Won	Scoring: Original Song Score and/or Adaptation
1974	Frederick Loewe; Alan Jay Lerner	The Little Prince	Nominated	Original Song Score and/or Adaptation. Shared with Douglas Gamley and Angela Morley
1975	Leonard Rosenman	Barry Lyndon	Won	Original Song Score and/or Adaptation
1975	Alex North	Bite the Bullet	Nominated	
1975	Jerry Goldsmith	The Wind and the Lion	Nominated	
1975	Peter Matz	Funny Lady	Nominated	
1975	Gerald Fried	Birds Do It, Bees Do It	Nominated	
1976	Jerry Goldsmith	The Omen	Won	Original Score
1976	Leonard Rosenman	Bound for Glory	Won	Original Song Score and/or Adaptation
1976	Bernard Herrmann	Obsession	Nominated	Posthumous nominations
1976	Bernard Herrmann	Taxi Driver	Nominated	Posthumous nominations
1976	Jerry Fielding	The Outlaw Josey Wales	Nominated	
1976	Lalo Schifrin	Voyage of the Damned	Nominated	
1977	Jonathan Tunick	A Little Night Music	Won	Original Song Score and Its Adaptation or Adaptation Score
1977	Marvin Hamlisch	The Spy Who Loved Me	Nominated	
1977	Joel Hirschhorn; Al Kasha; Irwin Kostal	Pete's Dragon	Nominated	Scoring Original Song Score and/or Adaptation
1977	Sherman Brothers	The Slipper and the Rose	Nominated	Shared with Angela Morley
1978	Jerry Goldsmith	The Boys from Brazil	Nominated	
1978	Dave Grusin	Heaven Can Wait	Nominated	
1978	Jerry Wexler	Pretty Baby	Nominated	
1979	Lalo Schifrin	The Amityville Horror	Nominated	
1979	Dave Grusin	The Champ	Nominated	
1979	Jerry Goldsmith	Star Trek: The Motion Picture	Nominated	
1979	Kenneth Ascher	The Muppet Movie	Nominated	Shared with Paul Williams
1980	Michael Gore	Fame	Won	
1981	Alex North	Dragonslayer	Nominated	
1981	Dave Grusin	On Golden Pond	Nominated	
1981	Randy Newman	Ragtime	Nominated	
1982	Jerry Goldsmith	Poltergeist	Nominated	
1982	Marvin Hamlisch	Sophie's Choice	Nominated	
1983	Alan and Marilyn Bergman	Yentl	Won	Song Score and Its Adaptation or Adaptation Score. Shared with Michel Legrand
1983	Michael Gore	Terms of Endearment	Nominated	
1983	Jerry Goldsmith	Under Fire	Nominated	
1983	Elmer Bernstein	Trading Places	Nominated	
1983	Lalo Schifrin	The Sting II	Nominated	
1983	Leonard Rosenman	Cross Creek	Nominated	
1984	Randy Newman	The Natural	Nominated	
1984	Alex North	Under the Volcano	Nominated	
1985	Fred Steiner; Joel Rosenbaum	The Color Purple	Nominated	Shared with Chris Boardman, Jorge Calandrelli, Andraé Crouch, Jack Hayes, Jerry Hey, Quincy Jones, Randy Kerber, Jeremy Lubbock, Caiphus Semenya, and Rod Temperton
1986	James Horner	Aliens	Nominated	
1986	Jerry Goldsmith	Hoosiers	Nominated	
1986	Leonard Rosenman	Star Trek IV: The Voyage Home	Nominated	
1988	Dave Grusin	The Milagro Beanfield War	Nominated	Half-Jewish
1988	Hans Zimmer	Rain Man	Nominated	
1989	James Horner	Field of Dreams	Nominated	
1989	Alan Menken	The Little Mermaid	Won	
1989	Dave Grusin	The Fabulous Baker Boys	Nominated	
1990	Randy Newman	Avalon	Nominated	
1990	Dave Grusin	Havana	Nominated	
1991	James Newton Howard	The Prince of Tides	Nominated	
1991	Alan Menken	Beauty and the Beast	Won	
1992	Alan Menken	Aladdin	Won	
1992	Jerry Goldsmith	Basic Instinct	Nominated	
1993	Elmer Bernstein	The Age of Innocence	Nominated	
1993	Dave Grusin	The Firm	Nominated	
1993	James Newton Howard	The Fugitive	Nominated	
1994	Thomas Newman	Little Women	Nominated	
1994	Thomas Newman	The Shawshank Redemption	Nominated	
1994	Hans Zimmer	The Lion King	Won	
1994	Elliot Goldenthal	Interview with the Vampire	Nominated	
1995	Luis Enríquez Bacalov	Il Postino: The Postman	Won	Original Dramatic Score
1995	James Horner	Apollo 13	Nominated	
1995	James Horner	Braveheart	Nominated	
1995	Alan Menken; Stephen Schwartz	Pocahontas	Won	Original Musical or Comedy Score
1995	Randy Newman	Toy Story	Nominated	
1995	Thomas Newman	Unstrung Heroes	Nominated	
1995	Marc Shaiman	The American President	Nominated	
1996	Alan Menken; Stephen Schwartz	The Hunchback of Notre Dame	Nominated	Original Musical or Comedy Score
1996	Randy Newman	James and the Giant Peach	Nominated	
1996	Marc Shaiman	The First Wives Club	Nominated	
1996	Hans Zimmer	The Preacher's Wife	Nominated	
1996	Elliot Goldenthal	Michael Collins	Nominated	
1997	Lynn Ahrens; David Newman	Anastasia	Nominated	Original Musical or Comedy Score. Shared with Stephen Flaherty
1997	James Horner	Titanic	Won	Original Dramatic Score
1997	James Newton Howard	My Best Friend's Wedding	Nominated	
1997	Hans Zimmer	As Good as It Gets	Nominated	
1997	Danny Elfman	Good Will Hunting	Nominated	
1997	Danny Elfman	Men in Black	Nominated	
1997	Philip Glass	Kundun	Nominated	
1997	Jerry Goldsmith	L.A. Confidential	Nominated	
1998	Randy Newman	A Bug's Life	Nominated	Original Musical or Comedy Score
1998	Randy Newman	Pleasantville	Nominated	Original Dramatic Score
1998	Stephen Schwartz; Hans Zimmer	The Prince of Egypt	Nominated	
1998	Marc Shaiman	Patch Adams	Nominated	
1998	Hans Zimmer	The Thin Red Line	Nominated	
1998	David Zippel; Jerry Goldsmith	Mulan	Nominated	Original Musical or Comedy Score. Shared with Matthew Wilder.
1999	Thomas Newman	American Beauty	Nominated	
2000	Hans Zimmer	Gladiator	Nominated	
2001	James Horner	A Beautiful Mind	Nominated	
2001	Randy Newman	Monsters, Inc.	Nominated	
2001	Howard Shore	The Lord of the Rings: The Fellowship of the Ring	Won	
2002	Elliot Goldenthal	Frida	Won	Jewish father
2002	Elmer Bernstein	Far from Heaven	Nominated	
2002	Philip Glass	The Hours	Nominated	
2002	Thomas Newman	Road to Perdition	Nominated	
2003	James Horner	House of Sand and Fog	Nominated	
2003	Thomas Newman	Finding Nemo	Nominated	
2003	Howard Shore	The Lord of the Rings: The Return of the King	Won	
2003	Danny Elfman	Big Fish	Nominated	
2004	James Newton Howard	The Village	Nominated	
2004	Thomas Newman	Lemony Snicket's A Series of Unfortunate Events	Nominated	
2006	Philip Glass	Notes on a Scandal	Nominated	
2006	Thomas Newman	The Good German	Nominated	
2007	James Newton Howard	Michael Clayton	Nominated	
2008	James Newton Howard	Defiance	Nominated	
2008	Thomas Newman	WALL-E	Nominated	
2008	Danny Elfman	Milk	Nominated	
2009	James Horner	Avatar	Nominated	
2009	Hans Zimmer	Sherlock Holmes	Nominated	
2010	Hans Zimmer	Inception	Nominated	
2011	Howard Shore	Hugo	Nominated	
2012	Thomas Newman	Skyfall	Nominated	
2013	Thomas Newman	Saving Mr. Banks	Nominated	
2014	Hans Zimmer	Interstellar	Nominated	
2015	Thomas Newman	Bridge of Spies	Nominated	
2016	Justin Hurwitz	La La Land	Won	
2016	Micachu	Jackie	Nominated	
2016	Thomas Newman	Passengers	Nominated	
2016	Nicholas Britell	Moonlight	Nominated	
2017	Hans Zimmer	Dunkirk	Nominated	
2018	Nicholas Britell	If Beale Street Could Talk	Nominated	
2018	Marc Shaiman	Mary Poppins Returns	Nominated	
2019	Randy Newman	Marriage Story	Nominated	
2019	Thomas Newman	1917	Nominated	
2020/2021	Emile Mosseri	Minari	Nominated	
2020/2021	James Newton Howard	News of the World	Nominated	
2021	Hans Zimmer	Dune	Won	
2021	Nicholas Britell	Don't Look Up	Nominated	
2022	Justin Hurwitz	Babylon	Nominated	
2023	Laura Karpman	American Fiction	Nominated	
2024	Daniel Blumberg	The Brutalist	Won	
2024	Stephen Schwartz	Wicked	Nominated	Shared with John Powell

== Best Music, Original Song ==
Best Music, Original Song
Year	Name	Film	Song	Status	Milestone / Notes
1934	Herb Magidson	The Gay Divorcee	"The Continental"	Won	Shared with Con Conrad
1934	Gus Kahn	Flying Down to Rio	"Carioca"	Nominated	Shared with Vincent Youmans and Edward Eliscu
1934	Leo Robin; Ralph Rainger	She Loves Me Not	"Love in Bloom"	Nominated	
1935	Al Dubin	Gold Diggers of 1935	"Lullaby of Broadway"	Won	Shared with Harry Warren
1935	Irving Berlin	Top Hat	"Cheek to Cheek"	Nominated	
1935	Dorothy Fields; Jerome Kern	Roberta	"Lovely to Look At"	Nominated	Fields' father was Jewish. Shared with Jimmy McHugh
1936	Dorothy Fields; Jerome Kern	Swing Time	"The Way You Look Tonight"	Won	
1936	Louis Alter	The Trail of the Lonesome Pine	"A Melody from the Sky"	Nominated	Shared with Sidney D. Mitchell
1937	Friedrich Hollander; Leo Robin	Artists and Models	"Whispers in the Dark"	Nominated	
1937	Al Dubin	Mr. Dodd Takes the Air	"Remember Me"	Nominated	Shared with Harry Warren
1937	George & Ira Gershwin	Shall We Dance	"They Can't Take That Away From Me"	Nominated	Posthumous nomination for George
1937	Sammy Fain; Lew Brown	Walter Wanger's Vogues of 1938	"That Old Feeling"	Nominated	
1938	Irving Berlin	Alexander's Ragtime Band	"Now it Can Be Told"	Nominated	
1938	Irving Berlin	Carefree	"Change Partners"	Nominated	
1938	Oscar Hammerstein II; Ben Oakland	The Lady Objects	"A Mist Over the Moon"	Nominated	
1938	Leo Robin; Ralph Rainger	The Big Broadcast of 1938	"Thanks for the Memory"	Won	
1938	Lionel Newman	The Cowboy and the Lady	"The Cowboy and the Lady"	Nominated	Shared with Arthur Quenzer
1939	Harold Arlen; Yip Harburg	The Wizard of Oz	"Over the Rainbow"	Won	
1939	Leo Robin; Ralph Rainger	Gulliver's Travels	"Faithful Forever"	Nominated	
1939	Irving Berlin	Second Fiddle	"I Poured My Heart Into a Song"	Nominated	
1940	Mack Gordon	Down Argentine Way	"Down Argentine Way"	Nominated	Shared with Harry Warren
1940	Jule Styne	Hit Parade of 1941	"Who Am I?"	Nominated	Shared with Walter Bullock
1940	Artie Shaw	Second Chorus	"Love of My Life"	Nominated	Shared with Johnny Mercer
1940	Gus Kahn	Spring Parade	"Waltzing in the Clouds"	Nominated	Shared with Robert Stolz
1940	Arthur Freed	Strike Up the Band	"Our Love Affair"	Nominated	Shared with Roger Edens
1941	Harold Arlen	Blues in the Night	"Blues in the Night"	Nominated	Shared with Johnny Mercer
1941	Oscar Hammerstein II; Jerome Kern	Lady Be Good	"The Last Time I Saw Paris"	Won	
1941	Frank Loesser; Louis Alter	Las Vegas Nights	"Dolores"	Nominated	
1941	Mack Gordon	Sun Valley Serenade	"Chattanooga Choo Choo"	Nominated	Shared with Harry Warren
1942	Irving Berlin	Holiday Inn	"White Christmas"	Won	
1942	Burton Lane; Ralph Freed	Babes on Broadway	"How About You?"	Nominated	
1942	Harry Revel	The Mayor of 44th Street	"There's a Breeze on Lake Louise"	Nominated	Shared with Mort Greene
1942	Mack Gordon	Orchestra Wives	"(I've Got a Gal in) Kalamazoo"	Nominated	Shared with Harry Warren
1942	Jerome Kern	You Were Never Lovelier	"Dearly Beloved"	Nominated	Shared with Johnny Mercer
1942	Jule Styne; Sammy Cahn	Youth on Parade	"I've Heard That Song Before"	Nominated	
1943	Mack Gordon	Hello, Frisco, Hello	"You'll Never Know"	Won	Shared with Harry Warren
1943	Harold Arlen; Yip Harburg	Cabin in the Sky	"Happiness Is a Thing Called Joe"	Nominated	
1943	Jule Styne	Hit Parade of 1943	"Change of Heart"	Nominated	Shared with Harold Adamson
1943	Harold Arlen	The Sky's the Limit	"My Shining Hour"	Nominated	Shared with Johnny Mercer
1943	Harold Arlen	Star-Spangled Rhythm	"That Old Black Magic"	Nominated	Shared with Johnny Mercer
1943	Al Dubin	Stage Door Canteen	"We Mustn't Say Goodbye"	Nominated	Shared with James V. Monaco
1943	Frank Loesser; Arthur Schwartz	Thank Your Lucky Stars	"They're Either Too Old Or Too Young"	Nominated	
1943	Herb Magidson	Hers to Hold	"Say a Pray'r for the Boys Over There"	Nominated	Shared with Jimmy McHugh
1944	Ira Gershwin; Jerome Kern	Cover Girl	"Long Ago (and Far Away)"	Nominated	
1944	Jule Styne; Sammy Cahn	Follow the Boys	"I'll Walk Alone"	Nominated	
1944	Lew Pollack	Lady, Let's Dance	"Silver Shadows and Golden Dreams"	Nominated	Shared with Charles Newman
1944	Harry Revel; Paul Francis Webster	Minstrel Man	"Remember Me to Carolina"	Nominated	
1944	Walter Kent	Song of the Open Road	"Too Much in Love"	Nominated	Shared with Kim Gannon
1944	Mack Gordon	Sweet and Low-Down	"I'm Making Believe"	Nominated	Shared with James V. Monaco
1944	Harold Arlen; Ted Koehler	Up in Arms	"Now I Know"	Nominated	
1944	Ted Koehler	Hollywood Canteen	"Sweet Dreams, Sweetheart"	Nominated	Shared with M. K. Jerome
1945	Oscar Hammerstein II; Richard Rodgers	State Fair	"It Might as Well Be Spring"	Won	
1945	Jule Styne; Sammy Cahn	Anchors Aweigh	"I Fall in Love Too Easily"	Nominated	
1945	Jule Styne; Sammy Cahn	Tonight and Every Night	"Anywhere"	Nominated	
1945	Yip Harburg; Jerome Kern	Can't Help Singing	"More and More"	Nominated	Posthumous nomination for Kern
1945	Walter Kent	Earl Carroll Vanities	"Endlessly"	Nominated	Shared with Kim Gannon
1945	Harold Arlen	Here Come the Waves	"Ac-Cent-Tchu-Ate the Positive"	Nominated	Shared with Johnny Mercer
1945	Victor Young; Edward Heyman	Love Letters	"Love Letters"	Nominated	
1945	Allie Wrubel; Herb Magidson	Sing Your Way Home	"I'll Buy That Dream"	Nominated	
1945	Ann Ronell	The Story of G.I. Joe	"Linda"	Nominated	
1945	Jay Livingston; Ray Evans	Why Girls Leave Home	"The Cat and the Canary"	Nominated	
1945	David Rose; Leo Robin	Wonder Man	"So in Love"	Nominated	
1945	Ray Heindorf; Ted Koehler	San Antonio	"Some Sunday Morning"	Nominated	Shared with M. K. Jerome
1946	Irving Berlin	Blue Skies	"You Keep Coming Back Like a Song"	Nominated	
1946	Oscar Hammerstein II; Jerome Kern	Centennial Summer	"All Through The Day"	Nominated	Posthumous nomination for Kern
1946	Mack Gordon	The Dolly Sisters	"I Can't Begin to Tell You"	Nominated	Shared with James V. Monaco
1947	Allie Wrubel	Song of the South	"Zip-a-Dee-Doo-Dah"	Won	Shared with Ray Gilbert
1947	Frank Loesser	The Perils of Pauline	"I Wish I Didn't Love You So"	Nominated	
1947	Mack Gordon; Josef Myrow	Mother Wore Tights	"You Do"	Nominated	
1947	Arthur Schwartz; Leo Robin	The Time, the Place and the Girl	"A Gal in Calico"	Nominated	
1948	Ray Evans; Jay Livingston	The Paleface	"Buttons and Bows"	Nominated	
1948	Harold Arlen; Leo Robin	Casbah	"For Every Man There's a Woman"	Nominated	
1948	Jule Styne; Sammy Cahn	Romance on the High Seas	"It's Magic"	Nominated	
1948	Friedrich Hollander; Leo Robin	That Lady in Ermine	"This Is the Moment"	Nominated	
1949	Frank Loesser	Neptune's Daughter	"Baby, It's Cold Outside"	Won	
1949	Alfred Newman; Mack Gordon	Come to the Stable	"Through a Long and Sleepless Night"	Nominated	
1949	Jule Styne; Sammy Cahn	It's a Great Feeling	"It's a Great Feeling"	Nominated	
1949	Victor Young	My Foolish Heart	"My Foolish Heart"	Nominated	Shared with Ned Washington
1950	Ray Evans; Jay Livingston	Captain Carey, U.S.A.	"Mona Lisa"	Won	
1950	Mack David; Al Hoffman; Jerry Livingston	Cinderella	"Bibbidi-Bobbidi-Boo"	Nominated	
1950	Fred Glickman	Singing Guns	"Mule Train"	Nominated	Shared with Hy Heath and Johnny Lange
1950	Nicholas Brodszky; Sammy Cahn	The Toast of New Orleans	"Be My Love"	Nominated	
1950	Mack Gordon; Josef Myrow	Wabash Avenue	"Wilhelmina"	Nominated	
1951	Lionel Newman	Golden Girl	"Never"	Nominated	Shared with Eliot Daniel
1951	Nicholas Brodszky; Sammy Cahn	Rich, Young and Pretty	"Wonder Why"	Nominated	
1951	Burton Lane; Alan Jay Lerner	Royal Wedding	"Too Late Now"	Nominated	
1951	Oscar Hammerstein II; Kalmar and Ruby	The Strip	"A Kiss To Build a Dream On"	Nominated	Posthumous nomination for Kalmar
1952	Dimitri Tiomkin	High Noon	"The Ballad of High Noon"	Won	Shared with Ned Washington
1952	Nicholas Brodszky; Sammy Cahn	Because You're Mine	"Because You're Mine"	Nominated	
1952	Frank Loesser	Hans Christian Andersen	"Thumbelina"	Nominated	
1952	Leo Robin	Just for You	"Zing a Little Zong"	Nominated	Shared with Harry Warren
1953	Sammy Fain; Paul Francis Webster	Calamity Jane	"Secret Love"	Won	
1953	Sylvia Fine; Herschel Burke Gilbert	The Moon Is Blue	"The Moon Is Blue"	Nominated	
1953	Nicholas Brodzsky; Leo Robin	Small Town Girl	"My Flaming Heart"	Nominated	
1954	Harold Arlen; Ira Gershwin	A Star is Born	"The Man That Got Away"	Nominated	
1954	Irving Berlin	White Christmas	"Count Your Blessings"	Nominated	
1954	Jule Styne; Sammy Cahn	Three Coins in the Fountain	"Three Coins in the Fountain"	Won	
1954	Dimitri Tiomkin	The High and the Mighty	"The High and the Mighty"	Nominated	Shared with Ned Washington
1954	Jack Lawrence	Susan Slept Here	"Hold My Hand"	Nominated	Shared with Richard Myers
1955	Sammy Fain; Paul Francis Webster	Love Is a Many-Splendored Thing	"Love Is a Many-Splendored Thing"	Won	
1955	Nicholas Brodzsky; Sammy Cahn	Love Me or Leave Me	"I'll Never Stop Loving You"	Nominated	
1955	Sammy Cahn	The Tender Trap	"(Love Is) The Tender Trap"	Nominated	Shared with Jimmy Van Heusen
1955	Alex North; Hy Zaret	Unchained	"Unchained Melody"	Nominated	
1956	Ray Evans; Jay Livingston	The Man Who Knew Too Much	"Que Sera, Sera (Whatever Will Be, Will Be)"	Won	
1956	Dimitri Tiomkin; Paul Francis Webster	Friendly Persuasion	"Friendly Persuasion"	Nominated	
1956	Victor Young; Sammy Cahn	Written on the Wind	"Written on the Wind"	Nominated	Posthumous nomination for Young
1957	Sammy Cahn	The Joker Is Wild	"All the Way"	Won	Shared with Jimmy Van Heusen
1957	Sammy Fain; Paul Francis Webster	April Love	"April Love"	Nominated	
1957	Ray Evans; Jay Livingston	Tammy and the Bachelor	"Tammy"	Nominated	
1957	Dimitri Tiomkin	Wild Is the Wind	"Wild Is the Wind"	Nominated	Shared with Ned Washington
1958	Frederick Loewe; Alan Jay Lerner	Gigi	"Gigi"	Won	
1958	Sammy Fain; Paul Francis Webster	A Certain Smile	"A Certain Smile"	Nominated	
1958	Sammy Fain; Paul Francis Webster	Marjorie Morningstar	"A Very Precious Love"	Nominated	
1958	Ray Evans; Jay Livingston	Houseboat	"Almost in Your Arms"	Nominated	
1958	Sammy Cahn	Some Came Running	"To Love and Be Loved"	Nominated	Shared with Jimmy Van Heusen
1959	Sammy Cahn	A Hole in the Head	"High Hopes"	Won	Shared with Jimmy Van Heusen
1959	Alfred Newman; Sammy Cahn	The Best of Everything	"The Best of Everything"	Nominated	
1959	Sylvia Fine	The Five Pennies	"The Five Pennies"	Nominated	
1959	Jerry Livingston; Mack David	The Hanging Tree	"The Hanging Tree"	Nominated	
1959	Dimitri Tiomkin	The Young Land	"Strange Are the Ways of Love"	Nominated	Shared with Ned Washington
1960	Paul Francis Webster	The Alamo	"The Green Leaves of Summer"	Nominated	
1960	Sammy Cahn	High Time	"The Second Time Around"	Nominated	
1960	André Previn	Pepe	"Faraway Part of Town"	Nominated	Shared with Dory Previn
1961	Mack David	Bachelor in Paradise	"Bachelor in Paradise"	Nominated	Shared with Henry Mancini
1961	Miklós Rózsa; Paul Francis Webster	El Cid	"The Falcon and the Dove"	Nominated	
1961	Sammy Cahn	Pocketful of Miracles	"Pocketful of Miracles"	Nominated	Shared with Jimmy Van Heusen
1961	Dimitri Tiomkin	Town Without Pity	"Town Without Pity"	Nominated	Shared with Ned Washington
1962	Paul Francis Webster; Bronisław Kaper	Mutiny on the Bounty	"Follow Me"	Nominated	
1962	Sammy Fain; Paul Francis Webster	Tender Is the Night	"Tender Is the Night"	Nominated	
1962	André Previn	Two for the Seesaw	"Second Chance"	Nominated	Shared with Dory Previn
1962	Elmer Bernstein; Mack David	Walk on the Wild Side	"Walk on the Wild Side"	Nominated	
1963	Sammy Cahn	Papa's Delicate Condition	"Call Me Irresponsible"	Won	Shared with Jimmy Van Heusen
1963	Dimitri Tiomkin; Paul Francis Webster	55 Days at Peking	"So Little Time"	Nominated	
1963	Ernest Gold; Mack David	It's a Mad, Mad, Mad, Mad World	"It's a Mad, Mad, Mad, Mad World"	Nominated	
1964	Sherman Brothers	Mary Poppins	"Chim Chim Cher-ee"	Won	
1964	Ray Evans; Jay Livingston	Dear Heart	"Dear Heart"	Nominated	Shared with Henry Mancini
1964	Mack David	Hush...Hush, Sweet Charlotte	"Hush...Hush, Sweet Charlotte"	Nominated	Shared with Frank De Vol
1964	Sammy Cahn	Robin and the 7 Hoods	"My Kind of Town"	Nominated	Shared with Jimmy Van Heusen
1964	Sammy Cahn	Where Love Has Gone	"Where Love Has Gone"	Nominated	Shared with Jimmy Van Heusen
1965	Johnny Mandel; Paul Francis Webster	The Sandpiper	"The Shadow of Your Smile"	Won	
1965	Jerry Livingston; Mack David	Cat Ballou	"The Ballad of Cat Ballou"	Nominated	
1965	Norman Gimbel	The Umbrellas of Cherbourg	"I Will Wait for You"	Nominated	Shared with Michel Legrand and Jacques Demy
1965	Burt Bacharach; Hal David	What's New Pussycat?	"What's New Pussycat?"	Nominated	
1966	Burt Bacharach; Hal David	Alfie	"Alfie"	Nominated	
1966	Don Black	Born Free	"Born Free"	Won	Shared with John Barry
1966	Johnny Mandel; Paul Francis Webster	An American Dream	"A Time for Love"	Nominated	
1966	Elmer Bernstein; Mack David	Hawaii	"My Wishing Doll"	Nominated	
1967	Burt Bacharach; Hal David	Casino Royale	"The Look of Love"	Nominated	
1967	Sammy Cahn	Thoroughly Modern Millie	"Thoroughly Modern Millie"	Nominated	Shared with Jimmy Van Heusen
1968	Alan and Marilyn Bergman	The Thomas Crown Affair	"The Windmills of Your Mind"	Won	Shared with Michel Legrand
1968	Sherman Brothers	Chitty Chitty Bang Bang	"Chitty Chitty Bang Bang"	Nominated	
1968	Jule Styne	Funny Girl	"Funny Girl"	Nominated	Shared with Bob Merrill
1968	Sammy Cahn	Star!	"Star!"	Nominated	Shared with Jimmy Van Heusen
1969	Burt Bacharach; Hal David	Butch Cassidy and the Sundance Kid	"Raindrops Keep Fallin' on My Head"	Won	
1969	Alan and Marilyn Bergman	The Happy Ending	"What Are You Doing the Rest of Your Life?"	Nominated	Shared with Michel Legrand
1969	Elmer Bernstein; Don Black	True Grit	"True Grit"	Nominated	
1970	Alan and Marilyn Bergman	Pieces of Dreams	"Pieces of Dreams"	Nominated	Shared with Michel Legrand
1971	Alan and Marilyn Bergman	Sometimes a Great Notion	"All His Children"	Nominated	Shared with Henry Mancini
1971	Marvin Hamlisch	Kotch	"Life is What You Make It"	Nominated	Shared with Johnny Mercer
1971	Sherman Brothers	Bedknobs and Broomsticks	"The Age of Not Believing"	Nominated	
1972	Alan and Marilyn Bergman	The Life and Times of Judge Roy Bean	"Marmalade, Molasses, and Honey"	Nominated	Shared with Maurice Jarre
1972	Don Black; Walter Scharf	Ben	"Ben"	Nominated	
1972	Al Kasha; Joel Hirschhorn	The Poseidon Adventure	"The Morning After"	Won	
1972	Sammy Fain; Paul Francis Webster	The Stepmother	"Strange Are the Ways of Love"	Nominated	
1973	Alan and Marilyn Bergman; Marvin Hamlisch	The Way We Were	"The Way We Were"	Won	
1973	Sammy Cahn	A Touch of Class	"All That Love Went to Waste"	Nominated	Shared with George Barrie
1974	Elmer Bernstein; Don Black	Gold	"Wherever Love Takes Me"	Nominated	
1974	Mel Brooks	Blazing Saddles	"Blazing Saddles"	Nominated	Shared with John Morris
1974	Al Kasha; Joel Hirschhorn	The Towering Inferno	"We May Never Love Like This Again"	Won	
1974	Frederick Loewe; Alan Jay Lerner	The Little Prince	"The Little Prince"	Nominated	
1975	Keith Carradine	Nashville	"I'm Easy"	Won	Carradine is of Polish-Jewish descent.
1975	Fred Ebb; John Kander	Funny Lady	"How Lucky Can You Get"	Nominated	
1975	Charles Fox; Norman Gimbel	The Other Side of the Mountain	"Richard's Window"	Nominated	
1975	Michael Masser; Gerry Goffin	Mahogany	"Theme from Mahogany (Do You Know Where You're Going To)"	Nominated	
1975	Sammy Cahn	Whiffs	"Now That We're in Love"	Nominated	Shared with George Barrie
1976	Don Black	The Pink Panther Strikes Again	"Come to Me"	Nominated	Shared with Henry Mancini
1976	Carol Connors	Rocky	"Gonna Fly Now"	Nominated	Shared with Bill Conti and Ayn Robbins
1976	Barbra Streisand	A Star Is Born	"Evergreen (Love Theme from A Star Is Born)"	Won	Shared with Paul Williams
1976	Sammy Fain; Paul Francis Webster	Half a House	"A World That Never Was"	Nominated	
1976	Jerry Goldsmith	The Omen	"Ave Satani"	Nominated	
1977	Joseph Brooks	You Light Up My Life	"You Light Up My Life"	Won	
1977	Carol Connors; Sammy Fain	The Rescuers	"Someone's Waiting for You"	Nominated	Shared with Ayn Robbins
1977	Marvin Hamlisch; Carole Bayer Sager	The Spy Who Loved Me	"Nobody Does It Better"	Nominated	
1977	Al Kasha; Joel Hirschhorn	Pete's Dragon	"Candle on the Water"	Nominated	
1977	Sherman Brothers	The Slipper and the Rose	"The Slipper and the Rose Waltz (He/She Danced With Me)"	Nominated	
1978	Alan and Marilyn Bergman; Marvin Hamlisch	Same Time, Next Year	"The Last Time I Felt Like This"	Nominated	
1978	Charles Fox; Norman Gimbel	Foul Play	"Ready to Take a Chance Again"	Nominated	
1978	Sherman Brothers	The Magic of Lassie	"When You're Loved"	Nominated	
1979	Alan and Marilyn Bergman; David Shire	The Promise	"Theme from The Promise (I'll Never Say 'Goodbye')"	Nominated	
1979	Norman Gimbel; David Shire	Norma Rae	"It Goes Like It Goes"	Won	
1979	Marvin Hamlisch; Carole Bayer Sager	Ice Castles	"Theme from Ice Castles (Through the Eyes of Love)"	Nominated	
1979	Robert Wells	10	"It's Easy to Say"	Nominated	Shared with Henry Mancini
1979	Kenneth Ascher	The Muppet Movie	"The Rainbow Connection"	Nominated	Shared with Paul Williams
1980	Michael Gore	Fame	"Fame"	Won	Shared with Dean Pitchford
1980	Michael Gore; Lesley Gore	Fame	"Out Here on My Own"	Nominated	
1980	Lalo Schifrin	The Competition	"People Alone"	Nominated	
1981	Burt Bacharach; Carole Bayer Sager	Arthur	"Arthur's Theme (Best That You Can Do)"	Won	Shared with Christopher Cross and Peter Allen
1981	Randy Newman	Ragtime	"One More Hour"	Nominated	
1982	Alan and Marilyn Bergman	Best Friends	"How Do You Keep the Music Playing?"	Nominated	Shared with Michel Legrand
1982	Alan and Marilyn Bergman	Yes, Giorgio	"If We Were In Love"	Nominated	Shared with John Williams
1982	Alan and Marilyn Bergman; Dave Grusin	Tootsie	"It Might Be You"	Nominated	
1982	Jack Nitzsche	An Officer and a Gentleman	"Up Where We Belong"	Won	Shared with Buffy Sainte-Marie and Will Jennings
1983	Alan and Marilyn Bergman	Yentl	"Papa, Can You Hear Me?"	Nominated	Shared with Michel Legrand
1983	Alan and Marilyn Bergman	Yentl	"The Way He Makes Me Feel"	Nominated	Shared with Michel Legrand
1985	Marvin Hamlisch; Ed Kleban	A Chorus Line	"Surprise, Surprise"	Nominated	
1986	Howard Ashman; Alan Menken	Little Shop of Horrors	"Mean Green Mother From Outer Space"	Nominated	
1986	James Horner; Barry Mann; Cynthia Weil	An American Tail	"Somewhere Out There"	Nominated	
1987	Diane Warren	Mannequin	"Nothing's Gonna Stop Us Now"	Nominated	Shared with Albert Hammond
1988	Carly Simon	Working Girl	"Let the River Run"	Won	
1988	Bob Telson	Bagdad Cafe	"Calling You"	Nominated	
1989	Alan and Marilyn Bergman; Marvin Hamlisch	Shirley Valentine	"The Girl Who Used to Be Me"	Nominated	
1989	Randy Newman	Parenthood	"I Love to See You Smile"	Nominated	
1989	Howard Ashman; Alan Menken	The Little Mermaid	"Kiss the Girl"	Nominated	
1989	Howard Ashman; Alan Menken	The Little Mermaid	"Under the Sea"	Won	
1990	Shel Silverstein	Postcards from the Edge	"I'm Checking Out"	Nominated	
1990	Stephen Sondheim	Dick Tracy	"Sooner or Later (I Always Get My Man)"	Won	
1991	Howard Ashman; Alan Menken	Beauty and the Beast	"Beauty and the Beast"	Won	Posthumous win and nominations for Ashman
1991	Howard Ashman; Alan Menken	Beauty and the Beast	"Belle"	Nominated	Posthumous win and nominations for Ashman
1991	Howard Ashman; Alan Menken	Beauty and the Beast	"Be Our Guest"	Nominated	Posthumous win and nominations for Ashman
1991	Michael Kamen	Robin Hood: Prince of Thieves	"(Everything I Do) I Do It for You"	Nominated	Shared with Bryan Adams and Robert John "Mutt" Lange
1992	Alan Menken	Aladdin	"A Whole New World"	Won	Shared with Tim Rice
1992	Howard Ashman; Alan Menken	Aladdin	"Friend Like Me"	Nominated	Posthumous nomination for Ashman
1993	Carole Bayer Sager	Beethoven's 2nd	"The Day I Fall in Love"	Nominated	Shared with James Ingram and Clif Magness
1993	Marc Shaiman	Sleepless in Seattle	"A Wink and a Smile"	Nominated	Shared with Ramsey McLean
1994	Carole Bayer Sager; James Newton Howard	Junior	"Look What Love Has Done"	Nominated	Shared with James Ingram and Patty Smyth
1994	Randy Newman	The Paper	"Make Up Your Mind"	Nominated	
1995	Alan and Marilyn Bergman	Sabrina	"Moonlight"	Nominated	Shared with John Williams
1995	Alan Menken; Stephen Schwartz	Pocahontas	"Colors of the Wind"	Won	
1995	Randy Newman	Toy Story	"You've Got a Friend in Me"	Nominated	
1995	Michael Kamen	Don Juan DeMarco	"Have You Ever Really Loved a Woman?"	Nominated	Shared with Bryan Adams and Robert John "Mutt" Lange
1996	Marvin Hamlisch; Barbra Streisand	The Mirror Has Two Faces	"I Finally Found Someone"	Nominated	Shared with Bryan Adams and Robert John Lange
1996	James Newton Howard	One Fine Day	"For the First Time"	Nominated	Shared with Jud Friedman and Allan Dennis Rich
1996	Diane Warren	Up Close and Personal	"Because You Loved Me"	Nominated	
1996	Adam Schlesinger	That Thing You Do!	"That Thing You Do"	Nominated	
1997	James Horner	Titanic	"My Heart Will Go On"	Won	Shared with Will Jennings
1997	Alan Menken; David Zippel	Hercules	"Go the Distance"	Nominated	
1997	Diane Warren	Con Air	"How Do I Live"	Nominated	
1997	Lynn Ahrens	Anastasia	"Journey to the Past"	Nominated	Shared with Stephen Flaherty
1998	Carole Bayer Sager	Quest for Camelot	"The Prayer"	Nominated	Shared with David Foster, Tony Renis, and Alberto Testa
1998	Randy Newman	Babe: Pig in the City	"That'll Do"	Nominated	
1998	Stephen Schwartz	The Prince of Egypt	"When You Believe"	Won	
1998	Diane Warren	Armageddon	"I Don't Want to Miss a Thing"	Nominated	
1999	Randy Newman	Toy Story 2	"When She Loved Me"	Nominated	
1999	Marc Shaiman	South Park: Bigger, Longer & Uncut	"Blame Canada"	Nominated	Shared with Trey Parker
1999	Diane Warren	Music of the Heart	Music of My Heart	Nominated	
2000	Bob Dylan	Wonder Boys	"Things Have Changed"	Won	
2000	James Schamus	Crouching Tiger, Hidden Dragon	"A Love Before Time"	Nominated	Shared with Jorge Calandrelli and Tan Dun
2000	Randy Newman	Meet the Parents	"A Fool in Love"	Nominated	
2001	Randy Newman	Monsters, Inc.	"If I Didn't Have You"	Won	
2001	Diane Warren	Pearl Harbor	"There You'll Be"	Nominated	
2002	Fred Ebb; John Kander	Chicago	"I Move On"	Nominated	
2002	Eliot Goldenthal; Julie Taymor	Frida	"Burn it Blue"	Nominated	
2002	Paul Simon	The Wild Thornberrys Movie	"Father and Daughter"	Nominated	
2003	Howard Shore	The Lord of the Rings: The Return of the King	"Into the West"	Won	Shared with Annie Lennox and Fran Walsh
2004	Jorge Drexler	The Motorcycle Diaries	"Al otro lado del río"	Won	
2004	Adam Duritz	Shrek 2	"Accidentally in Love"	Nominated	Shared with Dan Vickrey and Counting Crows
2006	Randy Newman	Cars	"Our Town"	Nominated	
2007	Alan Menken; Stephen Schwartz	Enchanted	"Happy Working Song"	Nominated	
2007	Alan Menken; Stephen Schwartz	Enchanted	"So Close"	Nominated	
2007	Alan Menken; Stephen Schwartz	Enchanted	"That's How You Know"	Nominated	
2008	Thomas Newman	WALL-E	"Down to Earth"	Nominated	Shared with Peter Gabriel
2009	Randy Newman	The Princess and the Frog	"Almost There"	Nominated	
2009	Randy Newman	The Princess and the Frog	"Down in New Orleans"	Nominated	
2009	Maury Yeston	Nine	"Take It All"	Nominated	
2010	Alan Menken; Glenn Slater	Tangled	"I See the Light"	Nominated	
2010	Randy Newman	Toy Story 3	"We Belong Together"	Won	
2012	Alain Boublil; Herbert Kretzmer; Claude-Michel Schönberg	Les Misérables	"Suddenly"	Nominated	
2013	Spike Jonze	Her	"The Moon Song"	Nominated	Shared with Karen O
2014	Diane Warren	Beyond the Lights	"Grateful"	Nominated	
2015	Diane Warren	The Hunting Ground	"Til It Happens to You"	Nominated	Shared with Lady Gaga
2016	Justin Hurwitz; Benj Pasek	La La Land	"City of Stars"	Won	Shared with Justin Paul
2016	Justin Hurwitz; Benj Pasek	La La Land	"Audition (The Fools Who Dream)"	Nominated	Shared with Justin Paul
2017	Diane Warren	Mudbound	"Stand Up for Something"	Nominated	Shared with Common
2018	Mark Ronson	A Star Is Born	"Shallow"	Won	Shared with Lady Gaga, Anthony Rossomando, and Andrew Wyatt
2018	Marc Shaiman; Scott Wittman	Mary Poppins Returns	"The Place Where Lost Things Go"	Nominated	
2018	Diane Warren	RBG	"I'll Fight"	Nominated	
2019	Randy Newman	Toy Story 4	"I Can't Let You Throw Yourself Away"	Nominated	
2019	Diane Warren	Breakthrough	"I'm Standing with You"	Nominated	
2020/2021	Diane Warren	The Life Ahead	"Io sì (Seen)"	Nominated	Shared with Laura Pausini
2021	Diane Warren	Four Good Days	"Somehow You Do"	Nominated	
2022	Diane Warren	Tell It Like a Woman	"Applause"	Nominated	
2023	Diane Warren	Flamin' Hot	"The Fire Inside"	Nominated	
2023	Mark Ronson	Barbie	"I'm Just Ken"	Nominated	Shared with Andrew Wyatt
2024	Diane Warren	The Six Triple Eight	"The Journey"	Nominated	
2025	Diane Warren	Diane Warren: Relentless	"Dear Me"	Nominated	
2025	Mark Sonnenblick; Ian Eisendrath	KPop Demon Hunters	"Golden"	Won	Shared with Ejae, 24, Ido, and Teddy
2025	Bryce Dessner	Train Dreams	"Train Dreams"	Nominated	Shared with Nick Cave

== Best Picture ==
Best Picture
Year	Name	Film	Status	Milestone / Notes
1928/1929	Irving Thalberg; Lawrence Weingarten	The Broadway Melody	Won	
1928/1929	Irving Thalberg; Harry Rapf	The Hollywood Revue of 1929	Nominated	
1928/1929	Ernst Lubitsch	The Patriot	Nominated	
1929/1930	Carl Laemmle Jr.	All Quiet on the Western Front	Won	
1929/1930	Irving Thalberg	The Big House	Nominated	
1929/1930	Jack L. Warner	Disraeli	Nominated	Shared with Darryl F. Zanuck
1929/1930	Ernst Lubitsch	The Love Parade	Nominated	
1930/1931	Adolph Zukor	Skippy	Nominated	
1930/1931	Irving Thalberg	Trader Horn	Nominated	
1931/1932	Irving Thalberg	Grand Hotel	Won	
1931/1932	Samuel Goldwyn	Arrowsmith	Nominated	
1931/1932	Hal B. Wallis	Five Star Final	Nominated	
1931/1932	Ernst Lubitsch	One Hour with You	Nominated	
1931/1932	Ernst Lubitsch	The Smiling Lieutenant	Nominated	
1931/1932	Adolph Zukor	Shanghai Express	Nominated	
1932/1933	Adolph Zukor	A Farewell to Arms	Nominated	
1932/1933	Hal B. Wallis	I Am a Fugitive from a Chain Gang	Nominated	
1932/1933	Alexander Korda	The Private Life of Henry VIII	Nominated	
1932/1933	Irving Thalberg	Smilin' Through	Nominated	
1934	Harry Cohn	It Happened One Night	Won	Shared with Frank Capra
1934	Irving Thalberg	The Barretts of Wimpole Street	Nominated	
1934	Cecil B. DeMille	Cleopatra	Nominated	
1934	Jack L. Warner; Hal B. Wallis	Flirtation Walk	Nominated	Shared with Robert Lord
1934	Pandro S. Berman	The Gay Divorcee	Nominated	
1934	William Goetz	The House of Rothschild	Nominated	Shared with Darryl F. Zanuck and Raymond Griffith
1934	John M. Stahl	Imitation of Life	Nominated	
1934	Harry Cohn	One Night of Love	Nominated	Shared with Everett Riskin
1934	David O. Selznick	Viva Villa!	Nominated	
1934	Jesse L. Lasky	The White Parade	Nominated	
1935	Irving Thalberg	Mutiny on the Bounty	Won	Shared with Frank Lloyd
1935	Pandro S. Berman	Alice Adams	Nominated	
1935	Pandro S. Berman	Top Hat	Nominated	
1935	Hal B. Wallis	Captain Blood	Nominated	Shared with Harry Joe Brown and Gordon Hollingshead
1935	David O. Selznick	David Copperfield	Nominated	
1936	Samuel Goldwyn	Dodsworth	Nominated	Shared with Merritt Hulbert
1936	Lawrence Weingarten	Libeled Lady	Nominated	
1936	Irving Thalberg	Romeo and Juliet	Nominated	
1936	David O. Selznick	A Tale of Two Cities	Nominated	
1936	Joe Pasternak	Three Smart Girls	Nominated	Shared with Charles R. Rogers
1937	Samuel Goldwyn	Dead End	Nominated	Shared with Merritt Hulbert
1937	Irving Thalberg; Albert Lewin	The Good Earth	Nominated	
1937	Joe Pasternak	One Hundred Men and a Girl	Nominated	
1937	Pandro S. Berman	Stage Door	Nominated	
1937	David O. Selznick	A Star Is Born	Nominated	
1938	Hal B. Wallis	The Adventures of Robin Hood	Nominated	Shared with Henry Blanke
1938	Hal B. Wallis	Four Daughters	Nominated	Shared with Henry Blanke
1938	Hal B. Wallis	Jezebel	Nominated	Shared with Henry Blanke
1939	David O. Selznick	Gone With The Wind	Won	
1939	David Lewis	Dark Victory	Nominated	
1939	Lewis Milestone	Of Mice and Men	Nominated	
1939	Walter Wanger	Stagecoach	Nominated	
1939	Mervyn LeRoy	The Wizard of Oz	Nominated	
1939	Samuel Goldwyn	Wuthering Heights	Nominated	
1940	David O. Selznick	Rebecca	Won	
1940	Jack L. Warner; Hal B. Wallis; David Lewis	All This, and Heaven Too	Nominated	
1940	Walter Wanger	Foreign Correspondent	Nominated	
1940	Hal B. Wallis	The Letter	Nominated	
1940	Joseph L. Mankiewicz	The Philadelphia Story	Nominated	
1941	Samuel Goldwyn	The Little Foxes	Nominated	
1941	Hal B. Wallis	The Maltese Falcon	Nominated	
1941	Hal B. Wallis	One Foot in Heaven	Nominated	
1941	Hal B. Wallis; Jesse L. Lasky	Sergeant York	Nominated	
1942	Hal B. Wallis	Kings Row	Nominated	
1942	Samuel Goldwyn	The Pride of the Yankees	Nominated	
1942	Jack L. Warner; Hal B. Wallis	Yankee Doodle Dandy	Nominated	Shared with William Cagney
1943	Hal B. Wallis	Casablanca	Won	
1943	Hal B. Wallis	Watch on the Rhine	Nominated	
1943	Ernst Lubitsch	Heaven Can Wait	Nominated	
1943	William Perlberg	The Song of Bernadette	Nominated	
1944	David O. Selznick	Since You Went Away	Nominated	
1945	Joe Pasternak	Anchors Aweigh	Nominated	
1945	Jerry Wald	Mildred Pierce	Nominated	
1945	David O. Selznick	Spellbound	Nominated	
1946	Samuel Goldwyn	The Best Years of Our Lives	Won	
1947	Samuel Goldwyn	The Bishop's Wife	Nominated	
1947	William Perlberg	Miracle on 34th Street	Nominated	
1948	Jerry Wald	Johnny Belinda	Nominated	
1948	Emeric Pressburger	The Red Shoes	Nominated	Shared with Michael Powell
1948	Anatole Litvak	The Snake Pit	Nominated	Shared with Robert Bassler
1949	Robert Rossen	All the King's Men	Won	
1949	Dore Schary	Battleground	Nominated	
1949	William Wyler	The Heiress	Nominated	
1950	Pandro S. Berman	Father of the Bride	Nominated	
1950	Sam Zimbalist	King Solomon's Mines	Nominated	
1951	Charles K. Feldman	A Streetcar Named Desire	Nominated	
1951	Arthur Freed	An American in Paris	Won	
1951	Anatole Litvak	Decision Before Dawn	Nominated	Shared with Frank McCarthy
1951	Sam Zimbalist	Quo Vadis	Nominated	
1952	Pandro S. Berman	Ivanhoe	Nominated	
1952	Cecil B. DeMille	The Greatest Show On Earth	Won	Jewish mother
1952	Stanley Kramer	High Noon	Nominated	
1953	John Houseman	Julius Caesar	Nominated	Father was Jewish
1953	William Wyler	Roman Holiday	Nominated	
1954	Jack Cummings	Seven Brides for Seven Brothers	Nominated	
1954	Stanley Kramer	The Caine Mutiny	Nominated	
1954	William Perlberg	The Country Girl	Nominated	
1954	Sam Spiegel	On the Waterfront	Won	
1955	Harold Hecht	Marty	Won	
1955	Hal B. Wallis	The Rose Tattoo	Nominated	
1956	Mike Todd	Around the World in 80 Days	Won	
1956	Cecil B. DeMille	The Ten Commandments	Nominated	
1956	William Wyler	Friendly Persuasion	Nominated	
1956	Henry Ginsberg	Giant	Nominated	Shared with George Stevens
1957	Sam Spiegel	The Bridge on the River Kwai	Won	
1957	Jerry Wald	Peyton Place	Nominated	
1957	William Goetz	Sayonara	Nominated	
1958	Arthur Freed	Gigi	Won	
1958	Stanley Kramer	The Defiant Ones	Nominated	
1958	Jack L. Warner	Auntie Mame	Nominated	
1958	Lawrence Weingarten	Cat on a Hot Tin Roof	Nominated	
1958	Harold Hecht	Separate Tables	Nominated	
1959	Otto Preminger	Anatomy of a Murder	Nominated	
1959	Sam Zimbalist	Ben-Hur	Won	Posthumous win.
1960	Billy Wilder	The Apartment	Won	
1960	Jerry Wald	Sons and Lovers	Nominated	
1960	Fred Zinnemann	The Sundowners	Nominated	
1961	Carl Foreman	The Guns of Navarone	Nominated	
1961	Robert Rossen	The Hustler	Nominated	
1961	Stanley Kramer	Judgment at Nuremberg	Nominated	
1962	Sam Spiegel	Lawrence of Arabia	Won	
1962	Aaron Rosenberg	Mutiny on the Bounty	Nominated	
1962	Alan J. Pakula	To Kill a Mockingbird	Nominated	
1963	Walter Wanger	Cleopatra	Nominated	
1964	Jack L. Warner	My Fair Lady	Won	
1964	Stanley Kubrick	Dr. Strangelove	Nominated	
1964	Hal B. Wallis	Becket	Nominated	
1965	Joseph Janni	Darling	Nominated	
1965	Stanley Kramer	Ship of Fools	Nominated	
1966	Fred Zinnemann	A Man for All Seasons	Won	
1966	Lewis Gilbert	Alfie	Nominated	
1966	Ernest Lehman	Who's Afraid of Virginia Woolf?	Nominated	
1967	Walter Mirisch	In the Heat of the Night	Won	
1967	Arthur P. Jacobs	Doctor Dolittle	Nominated	
1967	Lawrence Turman	The Graduate	Nominated	
1967	Stanley Kramer	Guess Who's Coming to Dinner	Nominated	
1968	Paul Newman	Rachel, Rachel	Nominated	
1969	Jerome Hellman	Midnight Cowboy	Won	
1969	Hal B. Wallis	Anne of the Thousand Days	Nominated	
1969	Ernest Lehman	Hello, Dolly!	Nominated	
1970	Ross Hunter	Airport	Nominated	
1970	Bob Rafelson	Five Easy Pieces	Nominated	Shared with Richard Wechsler
1970	Howard G. Minsky	Love Story	Nominated	
1970	Ingo Preminger	M*A*S*H	Nominated	
1971	Stanley Kubrick	A Clockwork Orange	Nominated	
1971	Stephen J. Friedman	The Last Picture Show	Nominated	
1971	Sam Spiegel	Nicholas and Alexandra	Nominated	
1972	Albert S. Ruddy	The Godfather	Won	
1972	Cy Feuer	Cabaret	Nominated	
1972	Robert B. Radnitz	Sounder	Nominated	
1973	Julia Phillips	The Sting	Won	First female producer to win Best Picture; Shared with Tony Bill and Michael Phillips
1973	Melvin Frank	A Touch of Class	Nominated	
1974	Robert Evans	Chinatown	Nominated	
1974	Marvin Worth	Lenny	Nominated	
1974	Irwin Allen	The Towering Inferno	Nominated	
1975	Michael Douglas; Saul Zaentz	One Flew Over the Cuckoo's Nest	Won	
1975	Stanley Kubrick	Barry Lyndon	Nominated	
1975	Martin Bregman	Dog Day Afternoon	Nominated	Shared with Martin Elfand
1976	Robert Chartoff; Irwin Winkler	Rocky	Won	
1976	Harold Leventhal	Bound for Glory	Nominated	Shared with Robert F. Blumofe
1976	Julia Phillips	Taxi Driver	Nominated	Shared with Michael Phillips
1977	Herbert Ross; Arthur Laurents	The Turning Point	Nominated	
1978	Jerome Hellman	Coming Home	Nominated	
1978	David Puttnam	Midnight Express	Nominated	Shared with Alan Marshall
1978	Paul Mazursky	An Unmarried Woman	Nominated	Shared with Tony Ray
1979	Stanley R. Jaffe	Kramer vs. Kramer	Won	
1980	Bernard Schwartz	Coal Miner's Daughter	Nominated	
1980	Robert Chartoff; Irwin Winkler	Raging Bull	Nominated	
1980	Claude Berri	Tess	Nominated	Shared with Timothy Burrill
1981	David Puttnam	Chariots of Fire	Won	
1982	Sydney Pollack	Tootsie	Nominated	Shared with Dick Richards
1982	Steven Spielberg	E.T. the Extra-Terrestrial	Nominated	Shared with Kathleen Kennedy
1982	Edward Lewis; Mildred Lewis	Missing	Nominated	
1983	James L. Brooks	Terms of Endearment	Won	
1983	Robert Chartoff; Irwin Winkler	The Right Stuff	Nominated	
1983	Michael Shamberg	The Big Chill	Nominated	
1984	Saul Zaentz	Amadeus	Won	
1984	David Puttnam	The Killing Fields	Nominated	Shared with Fernando Ghia
1985	Sydney Pollack	Out of Africa	Won	
1985	Steven Spielberg	The Color Purple	Nominated	Shared with Kathleen Kennedy, Frank Marshall, and Quincy Jones
1986	Arnold Kopelson	Platoon	Won	
1986	Burt Sugarman	Children of a Lesser God	Nominated	Shared with Patrick J. Palmer
1986	David Puttnam	The Mission	Nominated	Shared with Fernando Ghia
1987	James L. Brooks	Broadcast News	Nominated	
1987	Stanley R. Jaffe; Sherry Lansing	Fatal Attraction	Nominated	
1988	Lawrence Kasdan	The Accidental Tourist	Nominated	Shared with Charles Okun and Michael Grillo
1989	Oliver Stone	Born on the Fourth of July	Nominated	Jewish father. Shared with A. Kitman Ho
1989	Steven Haft	Dead Poets Society	Nominated	Shared with Paul Junger Witt and Tony Thomas
1989	Lawrence Gordon; Charles Gordon	Field of Dreams	Nominated	
1990	Walter F. Parkes; Lawrence Lasker	Awakenings	Nominated	
1990	Lisa Weinstein	Ghost	Nominated	
1990	Irwin Winkler	Goodfellas	Nominated	
1991	Barry Levinson	Bugsy	Nominated	Shared with Mark Johnson and Warren Beatty
1991	Oliver Stone	JFK	Nominated	Shared with A. Kitman Ho
1991	Barbra Streisand	The Prince of Tides	Nominated	Shared with Andrew S. Karsch
1992	Rob Reiner; Andrew Scheinman	A Few Good Men	Nominated	Shared with David Brown
1992	Martin Brest	Scent of a Woman	Nominated	
1993	Branko Lustig; Steven Spielberg	Schindler's List	Won	Shared with Gerald R. Molen
1993	Arnold Kopelson	The Fugitive	Nominated	
1993	Mike Nichols	The Remains of the Day	Nominated	Shared with John Calley and Ismail Merchant
1994	Wendy Finerman; Steve Tisch	Forrest Gump	Won	Shared with Steve Starkey
1994	Lawrence Bender	Pulp Fiction	Nominated	
1995	Brian Grazer	Apollo 13	Nominated	
1996	Saul Zaentz	The English Patient	Won	
1996	Ethan Coen	Fargo	Nominated	
1996	James L. Brooks	Jerry Maguire	Nominated	Shared with Laurence Mark, Richard Sakai, and Cameron Crowe
1997	Jon Landau	Titanic	Won	Shared with James Cameron
1997	James L. Brooks	As Good as It Gets	Nominated	Shared with Bridget Johnson and Kristi Zea
1997	Lawrence Bender	Good Will Hunting	Nominated	
1997	Arnon Milchan	L.A. Confidential	Nominated	Shared with Curtis Hanson and Michael G. Nathanson
1998	Harvey Weinstein; Edward Zwick	Shakespeare in Love	Won	Shared in David Parfitt, Donna Gigliotti, and Marc Norman
1998	Eric Fellner	Elizabeth	Nominated	Shared with Alison Owen and Tim Bevan
1998	Steven Spielberg; Mark Gordon	Saving Private Ryan	Nominated	Shared with Ian Bryce and Gary Levinsohn
1999	Bruce Cohen	American Beauty	Won	Shared with Dan Jinks
1999	Richard N. Gladstein	The Cider House Rules	Nominated	
1999	Michael Mann	The Insider	Nominated	Shared with Pieter Jan Brugge
1999	Barry Mendel	The Sixth Sense	Nominated	Shared with Frank Marshall and Kathleen Kennedy
2000	Branko Lustig	Gladiator	Won	Shared with David Franzoni and Douglas Wick
2000	Michael Shamberg; Stacey Sher	Erin Brockovich	Nominated	Shared with Danny DeVito
2000	Edward Zwick; Marshall Hershkovitz	Traffic	Nominated	Shared with Laura Bickford
2001	Brian Grazer	A Beautiful Mind	Won	Shared with Ron Howard
2001	Bob Balaban	Gosford Park	Nominated	Shared with Robert Altman and David Levy
2001	Ross Katz	In the Bedroom	Nominated	Shared with Graham Leader and Todd Field
2001	Barrie M. Osborne	The Lord of the Rings: The Fellowship of the Ring	Nominated	Shared with Peter Jackson and Fran Walsh
2002	Martin Richards	Chicago	Won	
2002	Harvey Weinstein	Gangs of New York	Nominated	Shared with Alberto Grimaldi
2002	Scott Rudin	The Hours	Nominated	Shared with Robert Fox
2002	Barrie M. Osborne	The Lord of the Rings: The Two Towers	Nominated	Shared with Peter Jackson and Fran Walsh
2002	Roman Polanski	The Pianist	Nominated	Shared with Robert Benmussa and Alain Sarde
2003	Barrie M. Osborne	The Lord of the Rings: The Return of the King	Won	Shared with Peter Jackson and Fran Walsh
2003	Ross Katz	Lost in Translation	Nominated	Shared with Sofia Coppola
2003	Samuel Goldwyn Jr.	Master and Commander: The Far Side of the World	Nominated	Shared with Peter Weir and Duncan Henderson
2003	Gary Ross	Seabiscuit	Nominated	Shared with Kathleen Kennedy and Frank Marshall
2004	Tom Rosenberg; Albert S. Ruddy	Million Dollar Baby	Won	Shared with Clint Eastwood
2004	Michael Mann	The Aviator	Nominated	Shared with Graham King
2004	Richard N. Gladstein	Finding Neverland	Nominated	Shared with Nellie Bellflower
2005	Cathy Schulman	Crash	Won	Shared with Paul Haggis
2005	James Schamus	Brokeback Mountain	Nominated	Shared with Diana Ossana
2005	Caroline Baron	Capote	Nominated	Shared with William Vince and Michael Ohoven
2005	Grant Heslov	Good Night, and Good Luck	Nominated	
2005	Steven Spielberg; Barry Mendel	Munich	Nominated	Shared with Kathleen Kennedy
2006	Steven Spielberg	Letters from Iwo Jima	Nominated	Shared with Clint Eastwood and Robert Lorenz
2006	Steve Golin	Babel	Nominated	Shared with Alejandro González Iñárritu and Jon Kilik
2006	David T. Friendly; Peter Saraf; Marc Turtletaub	Little Miss Sunshine	Nominated	
2007	Ethan Coen; Joel Coen; Scott Rudin	No Country for Old Men	Won	
2007	Eric Fellner	Atonement	Nominated	Shared with Tim Bevan and Paul Webster
2007	Mason Novick	Juno	Nominated	Shared with Lianne Halfon and Russell Smith
2007	Sydney Pollack	Michael Clayton	Nominated	Shared with Jennifer Fox and Kenny Orent
2008	Brian Grazer; Eric Fellner	Frost/Nixon	Nominated	Shared with Ron Howard
2008	Bruce Cohen	Milk	Nominated	Shared with Dan Jinks
2008	Sydney Pollack	The Reader	Nominated	Shared with Anthony Minghella, Donna Gigliotti, and Redmond Morris. Posthumous nominations for Pollack and Minghella
2009	Mark Boal; Greg Shapiro	The Hurt Locker	Won	Shared with Kathryn Bigelow and Nicolas Chartier
2009	Jon Landau	Avatar	Nominated	Shared with James Cameron
2009	Andrew Kosove	The Blind Side	Nominated	Shared with Gil Netter and Broderick Johnson
2009	Ethan Coen; Joel Coen	A Serious Man	Nominated	
2009	Lawrence Bender	Inglourious Basterds	Nominated	
2009	Ivan Reitman; Jason Reitman	Up in the Air	Nominated	Shared with Daniel Dubiecki
2010	Emile Sherman	The King's Speech	Won	Shared with Iain Canning and Gareth Unwin
2010	Mike Medavoy	Black Swan	Nominated	Shared with Scott Franklin and Brian Oliver
2010	David Hoberman; Todd Lieberman	The Fighter	Nominated	Shared with Mark Wahlberg
2010	Gary Gilbert; Jeff Levy-Hinte	The Kids Are All Right	Nominated	Shared with Celine Rattray
2010	Michael De Luca; Scott Rudin	The Social Network	Nominated	De Luca is of German-Jewish descent. Shared with Dana Brunetti and Ceán Chaffin
2010	Ethan Coen; Joel Coen; Scott Rudin	True Grit	Nominated	
2011	Thomas Langmann	The Artist	Won	
2011	Scott Rudin	Extremely Loud & Incredibly Close	Nominated	
2011	Michael Barnathan	The Help	Nominated	Shared with Brunson Green and Chris Columbus
2011	Letty Aronson; Stephen Tenenbaum	Midnight in Paris	Nominated	
2011	Rachael Horovitz; Michael De Luca	Moneyball	Nominated	Shared with Brad Pitt
2011	Steven Spielberg	War Horse	Nominated	Shared with Kathleen Kennedy
2012	Grant Heslov	Argo	Won	Shared with Ben Affleck and George Clooney
2012	Dan Janvey	Beasts of the Southern Wild	Nominated	Shared with Josh Penn and Michael Gottwald
2012	Stacey Sher	Django Unchained	Nominated	Shared with Reginald Hudlin and Pilar Savone
2012	Eric Fellner	Les Misérables	Nominated	Shared with Tim Bevan, Debra Hayward, and Cameron Mackintosh
2012	Steven Spielberg	Lincoln	Nominated	Shared with Kathleen Kennedy
2012	Bruce Cohen	Silver Linings Playbook	Nominated	Shared with Donna Gigliotti and Jonathan Gordon
2012	Mark Boal; Megan Ellison	Zero Dark Thirty	Nominated	Shared with Kathryn Bigelow
2013	Jeremy Kleiner	12 Years a Slave	Won	Shared with Brad Pitt, Dede Gardner, Steve McQueen, and Anthony Katagas
2013	Megan Ellison; Charles Roven	American Hustle	Nominated	Shared with Richard Suckle and Jonathan Gordon
2013	Michael De Luca; Scott Rudin	Captain Phillips	Nominated	Shared with Dana Brunetti
2013	Robbie Brenner; Rachel Winter	Dallas Buyers Club	Nominated	
2013	David Heyman	Gravity	Nominated	Shared with Alfonso Cuáron
2013	Spike Jonze; Megan Ellison	Her	Nominated	Shared with Vincent Landay
2013	Emma Tillinger Koskoff	The Wolf of Wall Street	Nominated	Jewish paternal grandfather. Shared with Martin Scorsese, Leonardo DiCaprio, and Joey McFarland
2014	Andrew Lazar	American Sniper	Nominated	Shared with Clint Eastwood, Robert Lorenz, Bradley Cooper, and Peter Morgan
2014	Scott Rudin; Steven Rales	The Grand Budapest Hotel	Nominated	Shared with Wes Anderson and Jeremy Dawson
2014	Nora Grossman; Ido Ostrowsky; Teddy Schwarzman	The Imitation Game	Nominated	
2014	Jeremy Kleiner	Selma	Nominated	Shared with Christian Colson, Dede Gardner, and Oprah Winfrey
2014	Eric Fellner	The Theory of Everything	Nominated	Shared with Tim Bevan, Lisa Bruce, and Anthony McCarten
2014	Jason Blum	Whiplash	Nominated	Shared with Helen Estabrook and David Lancaster
2015	Nicole Rocklin; Michael Sugar; Steve Golin	Spotlight	Won	Shared with Blye Pagon Faust
2015	Jeremy Kleiner	The Big Short	Nominated	Shared with Brad Pitt and Dede Gardner
2015	Marc Platt; Steven Spielberg	Bridge of Spies	Nominated	Shared with Kristie Macosko Krieger
2015	Simon Kinberg	The Martian	Nominated	Shared with Ridley Scott, Michael Schaefer, and Mark Huffam
2015	Steve Golin; Arnon Milchan	The Revenant	Nominated	Shared with Alejandro G. Iñárritu, Mary Parent, and Keith Redmon
2016	Jeremy Kleiner	Moonlight	Won	Shared with Adele Romanski and Dede Gardner
2016	Shawn Levy; David Linde	Arrival	Nominated	Shared with Dan Levine and Aaron Ryder
2016	Scott Rudin	Fences	Nominated	Shared with Todd Black and Denzel Washington
2016	David Permut	Hacksaw Ridge	Nominated	Shared with Bill Mechanic
2016	Carla Hacken; Julie Yorn	Hell or High Water	Nominated	
2016	Peter Chernin	Hidden Figures	Nominated	Shared with Donna Gigliotti, Jenno Topping, Pharrell Williams, and Theodore Melfi
2016	Marc Platt; Jordan Horowitz; Fred Berger	La La Land	Nominated	
2016	Emile Sherman	Lion	Nominated	Shared with Iain Canning and Angie Fielder
2017	Peter Spears	Call Me by Your Name	Nominated	Shared with Luca Guadagnino, Emilie Georges, and Marco Morabito
2017	Eric Fellner	Darkest Hour	Nominated	Shared with Tim Bevan, Lisa Bruce, Anthony McCarten, and Douglas Urbanski
2017	Jason Blum	Get Out	Nominated	Shared with Jordan Peele, Edward H. Hamm Jr., and Sean McKittrick
2017	Scott Rudin	Lady Bird	Nominated	Shared with Eli Bush and Evelyn O'Neill
2017	Megan Ellison	Phantom Thread	Nominated	Shared with Paul Thomas Anderson, JoAnne Sellar, and Daniel Lupi
2017	Amy Pascal; Steven Spielberg	The Post	Nominated	Shared with Kristie Macosko Krieger
2018	Charles B. Wessler	Green Book	Won	Shared with Jim Burke, Brian Currie, Peter Farrelly, and Nick Vallelonga
2018	Kevin Feige	Black Panther	Nominated	
2018	Jason Blum	BlacKkKlansman	Nominated	Shared with Sean McKittrick, Raymond Mansfield, Jordan Peele, and Spike Lee
2018	Bill Gerber	A Star Is Born	Nominated	Shared with Bradley Cooper and Lynette Howell Taylor
2018	Jeremy Kleiner	Vice	Nominated	Shared with Dede Gardner, Adam McKay, and Kevin Messick
2019	Peter Chernin; James Mangold	Ford v Ferrari	Nominated	Shared with Jenno Topping
2019	Jane Rosenthal; Emma Tillinger Koskoff	The Irishman	Nominated	Shared with Martin Scorsese and Robert De Niro
2019	Taika Waititi	Jojo Rabbit	Nominated	Shared with Carthew Neal
2019	Todd Phillips; Emma Tillinger Koskoff	Joker	Nominated	Shared with Bradley Cooper
2019	Amy Pascal	Little Women	Nominated	
2019	Noah Baumbach; David Heyman	Marriage Story	Nominated	
2019	Sam Mendes	1917	Nominated	Shared with Pippa Harris, Jayne-Ann Tenggren, and Callum McDougall
2019	David Heyman	Once Upon a Time in Hollywood	Nominated	Shared with Shannon McIntosh and Quentin Tarantino
2020/2021	Peter Spears; Dan Janvey; Mollye Asher	Nomadland	Won	Shared with Frances McDormand and Chloé Zhao
2020/2021	Eric Roth	Mank	Nominated	Shared with Ceán Chaffin and Douglas Urbanski
2020/2021	Marc Platt	The Trial of the Chicago 7	Nominated	Shared with Stuart M. Besser
2021	Patrick Wachsberger	CODA	Won	Shared with Philippe Rousselet and Fabrice Gianfermi
2021	Emile Sherman	The Power of the Dog	Nominated	Shared with Jane Campion, Iain Canning, Roger Frappier, and Tanya Seghatchian
2021	Steven Spielberg	West Side Story	Nominated	Shared with Kristie Macosko Krieger
2022	Jon Landau	Avatar: The Way of Water	Nominated	Shared with James Cameron
2022	Gail Berman; Schuyler Weiss	Elvis	Nominated	Shared with Baz Luhrmann, Catherine Martin, and Patrick McCormick
2022	Steven Spielberg; Tony Kushner	The Fabelmans	Nominated	Shared with Kristie Macosko Krieger
2022	Alexandra Milchan	Tár	Nominated	Shared with Todd Field and Scott Lambert
2022	David Ellison; Jerry Bruckheimer	Top Gun: Maverick	Nominated	Shared with Tom Cruise and Christopher McQuarrie
2022	Jeremy Kleiner	Women Talking	Nominated	Shared with Dede Gardner and Frances McDormand
2023	David Heyman	Barbie	Nominated	Shared with Margot Robbie, Tom Ackerley, and Robbie Brenner
2023	Dan Friedkin	Killers of the Flower Moon	Nominated	Shared with Bradley Thomas, Martin Scorsese, and Daniel Lupi
2023	Steven Spielberg	Maestro	Nominated	Shared with Bradley Cooper, Fred Berner, Amy Durning, and Kristie Macosko Krieger
2024	D.J. Gugenheim	The Brutalist	Nominated	Shared with Brady Corbet, Brian Young, Andrew Morrison, and Nick Gordon
2024	Fred Berger; James Mangold	A Complete Unknown	Nominated	Shared with Alex Heineman
2024	Tessa Ross	Conclave	Nominated	Shared with Juliette Howell and Michael Jackman
2024	Jeremy Kleiner	Nickel Boys	Nominated	Shared with Dede Gardner and Joslyn Barnes
2024	Eric Fellner	The Substance	Nominated	Shared with Coralie Fargeat and Tim Bevan
2024	Marc Platt	Wicked	Nominated	
2025	Jeremy Kleiner; Jerry Bruckheimer	F1	Nominated	Shared with Chad Oman, Brad Pitt, Dede Gardner, and Joseph Kosinski
2025	Scott Stuber	Frankenstein	Nominated	Shared with Guillermo del Toro and J. Miles Dale
2025	Steven Spielberg; Sam Mendes	Hamnet	Nominated	Shared with Liza Marshall, Pippa Harris, and Nicolas Gonda
2025	Ronald Bronstein; Josh Safdie; Timothée Chalamet	Marty Supreme	Nominated	Shared with Eli Bush and Anthony Katagas
2025	Teddy Schwarzman; Will Janowitz	Train Dreams	Nominated	Shared with Marissa McMahon, Ashley Schlaifer, and Michael Heimler

== Best Production Design ==
Best Production Design
Year	Name	Film	Status	Milestone / Notes
1931/1932	Lazare Meerson	À Nous la Liberté	Nominated	
1938	Boris Leven; Bernard Herzbrun	Alexander's Ragtime Band	Nominated	
1940	Vincent Korda	The Thief of Bagdad	Won	Color Category
1941	Vincent Korda	That Hamilton Woman	Nominated	Black and White Category. Shared with Julia Heron
1941	Nathan Juran	How Green Was My Valley	Won	Black and White Category. Shared with Richard Day and Thomas Little
1942	Boris Leven	The Shanghai Gesture	Nominated	Black and White Category
1942	Ralph Berger	Silver Queen	Nominated	Black and White Category. Shared with Emile Kuri
1942	Vincent Korda	Rudyard Kipling's Jungle Book	Nominated	Color Category. Shared with Julia Heron
1944	Paul Huldschinsky	Gaslight	Won	Black and White Category. Shared with Cedric Gibbons, William Ferrari, and Edwin B. Willis
1946	Nathan Juran	The Razor's Edge	Nominated	Black and White Category. Shared with Richard Day, Thomas Little, and Paul S. Fox
1949	Harry Horner	The Heiress	Won	Black and White Category. Shared with John Meehan and Emile Kuri
1952	Hal Pereira	Carrie	Nominated	Black and White Category. Shared with Roland Anderson and Emile Kuri
1952	Charles S. Thompson	The Quiet Man	Nominated	Color Category. Shared with Frank Hotaling and John McCarthy Jr.
1953	Hal Pereira	Roman Holiday	Nominated	Black and White Category. Shared with Walter H. Tyler
1954	Hal Pereira	The Country Girl	Nominated	Black and White Category. Shared with Roland Anderson, Samuel M. Comer, and Grace Gregory
1954	Hal Pereira	Sabrina	Nominated	Black and White Category. Shared with Walter H. Tyler, Samuel M. Comer, and Ray Moyer
1954	Hal Pereira	Red Garters	Nominated	Color Category. Shared with Roland Anderson, Samuel M. Comer, and Ray Moyer
1954	Max Ophüls	Le Plaisir	Nominated	Black and White Category
1954	Irene Sharaff	A Star is Born	Nominated	Color Category. Shared with Malcolm C. Bert, Gene Allen, and George James Hopkins
1955	Hal Pereira	The Rose Tattoo	Won	Black and White Category. Shared with Tambi Larsen, Samuel M. Comer, and Arthur Krams
1955	Hal Pereira	To Catch a Thief	Nominated	Color Category. Shared with Joseph McMillan Johnson, Samuel M. Comer, and Arthur Krams
1955	Jo Mielziner	Picnic	Won	Color Category. Shared with William Flannery and Robert Priestley
1956	Hal Pereira	The Proud and Profane	Nominated	Black and White Category. Shared with A. Earl Hedrick, Samuel M. Comer, and Frank R. McKelvy
1956	Ken Adam	Around the World in 80 Days	Nominated	Color Category. Shared with James W. Sullivan and Ross Dowd
1956	Boris Leven	Giant	Nominated	Color Category. Shared with Ralph S. Hurst
1957	Hal Pereira	Funny Face	Nominated	Shared with George Davis, Samuel M. Comer, and Ray Moyer
1958	Hal Pereira	Vertigo	Nominated	Shared with Henry Bumstead, Samuel M. Comer, and Frank R. McKelvy
1959	Hal Pereira	Career	Nominated	Black and White Category. Shared with Walter H. Tyler, Samuel M. Comer, and Arthur Krams
1959	Oliver Messel	Suddenly, Last Summer	Nominated	Black and White Category. Shared with William Kellner and Scott Slimon
1960	Alexandre Trauner	The Apartment	Won	Black and White Category. Shared with Edward G. Boyle
1960	Hal Pereira	Visit to a Small Planet	Nominated	Black and White Category. Shared with Walter Tyler, Samuel M. Comer, and Arthur Krams
1960	Hal Pereira	It Started in Naples	Nominated	Color Category. Shared with Roland Anderson, Samuel M. Comer, and Arrigo Breschi
1961	Boris Leven	West Side Story	Won	Color Category. Shared with Victor A. Gangelin
1961	Harry Horner	The Hustler	Won	Black and White Category. Shared with Gene Callahan
1961	Hal Pereira	Breakfast at Tiffany's	Nominated	Color Category. Shared with Roland Anderson, Samuel M. Comer, and Ray Moyer
1961	Hal Pereira	Summer and Smoke	Nominated	Color Category. Shared with Roland Anderson, Samuel M. Comer, and Frank R. McKelvy
1962	Vincent Korda	The Longest Day	Nominated	Black and White Category. Shared with Ted Haworth, Léon Barsacq, and Gabriel Béchir
1962	Hal Pereira	The Pigeon That Took Rome	Nominated	Black and White Category. Shared with Roland Anderson, Samuel M. Comer, and Frank R. McKelvy
1963	Hal Pereira	Hud	Nominated	Black and White Category. Shared with Tambi Larsen, Samuel M. Comer, and Robert R. Benton
1963	Hal Pereira	Love with the Proper Stranger	Nominated	Black and White Category. Shared with Roland Anderson, Samuel M. Comer, and Grace Gregory
1963	Hal Pereira	Come Blow Your Horn	Nominated	Color Category. Shared with Roland Anderson, Samuel M. Comer, and James W. Payne
1965	Hal Pereira	The Slender Thread	Nominated	Black and White Category. Shared with Jack Poplin, Robert R. Benton, and Joseph Kish
1965	Hal Pereira	The Spy Who Came In from the Cold	Nominated	Black and White Category. Shared with Tambi Larsen, Ted Marshall, and Josie MacAvin
1965	Charles S. Thompson	A Patch of Blue	Nominated	Black and White Category. Shared with George Davis, Urie McCleary, and Henry Grace
1965	Boris Leven	The Sound of Music	Nominated	Color Category. Shared with Walter M. Scott and Ruby R. Levitt
1966	Richard Sylbert	Who's Afraid of Virginia Woolf?	Won	Black and White Category. Shared with George James Hopkins
1966	Hal Pereira	The Oscar	Nominated	Color Category. Shared with Arthur Lonergan, Robert R. Benton, and James W. Payne
1966	Boris Leven	The Sand Pebbles	Nominated	Color Category. Shared with Walter M. Scott, John Sturtevant, and William Kiernan
1968	Boris Leven	Star!	Nominated	Shared with Walter M. Scott and Howard Bristol
1969	Harry Horner	They Shoot Horses, Don't They?	Nominated	Shared with Frank R. McKelvy
1971	Boris Leven	The Andromeda Strain	Nominated	Shared with William H. Tuntke and Ruby R. Levitt
1974	Richard Sylbert	Chinatown	Nominated	Shared with W. Stewart Campbell and Ruby R. Levitt
1975	Ken Adam	Barry Lyndon	Won	Shared with Roy Walker and Vernon Dixon
1975	Alexandre Trauner	The Man Who Would Be King	Nominated	Shared with Tony Inglis and Peter James
1975	Richard Sylbert	Shampoo	Nominated	Shared with W. Stewart Campbell and George Gaines
1977	Ken Adam	The Spy Who Loved Me	Nominated	Shared with Peter Lamont and Hugh Scaife
1978	Paul Sylbert	Heaven Can Wait	Won	Shared with Edwin O'Donovan and George Gaines
1978	Mel Bourne	Interiors	Nominated	Shared with Daniel Robert
1979	Harold Michelson	Star Trek: The Motion Picture	Nominated	Shared with Joseph R. Jennings, Leon Harris, John Vallone, and Linda DeScenna
1981	Patrizia von Brandenstein	Ragtime	Nominated	Shared with John Graysmark, Tony Reading, George DeTitta Sr., George DeTitta Jr., and Peter Howitt
1981	Richard Sylbert	Reds	Nominated	Shared with Michael Seirton
1983	Harold Michelson; Polly Platt	Terms of Endearment	Nominated	Shared with Tom Pedigo and Anthony Mondell
1984	Patrizia von Brandenstein	Amadeus	Won	Shared with Karel Černý
1984	Richard Sylbert	The Cotton Club	Nominated	Shared with George Gaines
1984	Mel Bourne; Bruce Weintraub	The Natural	Nominated	Shared with Angelo P. Graham
1986	Boris Leven	The Color of Money	Nominated	Shared with Karen O'Hara
1986	Carol Joffe	Hannah and Her Sisters	Nominated	Shared with Stuart Wurtzel
1987	Carol Joffe	Radio Days	Nominated	Shared with Santo Loquasto, Leslie Bloom, and George DeTitta Jr.
1987	Patrizia von Brandenstein	The Untouchables	Nominated	Shared with William A. Elliott and Hal Gausman
1989	Anton Furst	Batman	Won	Shared with Peter Young
1990	Richard Sylbert	Dick Tracy	Won	Shared with Rick Simpson
1991	Mel Bourne	The Fisher King	Nominated	Shared with Cindy Carr
1991	Paul Sylbert	The Prince of Tides	Nominated	Shared with Caryl Heller
1993	Allan Starski	Schindler's List	Won	Shared with Ewa Braun
1993	Ken Adam	Addams Family Values	Nominated	Shared with Marvin March
1994	Ken Adam	The Madness of King George	Won	Shared with Carolyn Scott
2000	Arthur Max	Gladiator	Nominated	Shared with Crispian Sallis
2007	Arthur Max	American Gangster	Nominated	Shared with Beth Rubino
2013	Judy Becker	American Hustle	Nominated	Shared with Heather Loeffler
2015	Arthur Max	The Martian	Nominated	Shared with Celia Bobak
2023	Arthur Max	Napoleon	Nominated	Shared with Elli Griff
2024	Judy Becker	The Brutalist	Nominated	Shared with Patricia Cuccia

== Best Animated Short Film ==
Best Animated Short Film
Year	Name	Film	Status	Milestone / Notes
1931/1932	Leon Schlesinger	It's Got Me Again!	Nominated	
1934	Charles Mintz	Holiday Land	Nominated	
1937	Charles Mintz	The Little Match Girl	Nominated	
1940	Leon Schlesinger	A Wild Hare	Nominated	
1941	Leon Schlesinger	Hiawatha's Rabbit Hunt	Nominated	
1941	Max Fleischer	Superman	Nominated	
1942	Leon Schlesinger	Pigs in a Polka	Nominated	
1943	Leon Schlesinger	Greetings Bait	Nominated	
1943	Dave Fleischer	Imagination	Nominated	
1959	Ernest Pintoff	The Violinist	Nominated	
1960	William L. Snyder	Munro	Won	
1961	Friz Freleng	The Pied Piper of Guadalupe	Nominated	
1962	Faith Hubley	The Hole	Won	Shared with John Hubley
1962	Jules Engel	Icarus Montgolfier Wright	Nominated	
1962	William L. Snyder	Self Defense—For Cowards	Nominated	
1963	Ernest Pintoff	The Critic	Won	
1964	Friz Freleng	The Pink Phink	Won	Shared with David H. DePatie
1964	William L. Snyder	Here's Nudnik	Nominated	
1964	William L. Snyder	How to Avoid Friendship	Nominated	
1965	Emanuele Luzzati	The Thieving Magpie	Nominated	
1966	Faith Hubley	A Herb Alpert and the Tijuana Brass Double Feature	Won	Shared with John Hubley
1966	Friz Freleng	The Pink Blueprint	Nominated	Shared with David H. DePatie
1966	Wolf Koenig	The Drag	Nominated	Shared with Robert Verrall
1968	Faith Hubley	Windy Day	Nominated	Shared with John Hubley
1968	Wolf Koenig	What on Earth!	Nominated	Shared with Robert Verrall
1969	Faith Hubley	Of Men and Demons	Nominated	Shared with John Hubley
1969	Wolf Koenig	The House That Jack Built	Nominated	Shared with Robert Verrall
1973	Emanuele Luzzati	Pulcinella	Nominated	Shared with Guilo Gianini
1974	Faith Hubley	Voyage to Next	Nominated	Shared with John Hubley
1977	Faith Hubley	The Doonesbury Special	Nominated	Shared with John Hubley and Garry Trudeau
1977	Robert Grossman	Jimmy the C	Nominated	Shared with James Picker and Craig Whitaker
1979	Paul Fierlinger	It's So Nice to Have a Wolf Around the House	Nominated	Jewish mother
1981	Janet Perlman	The Tender Tale of Cinderella Penguin	Nominated	
1984	Morton Schindel; Michael Sporn	Doctor De Soto	Nominated	
1994	David Fine	Bob's Birthday	Won	Shared with Alison Snowden
1998	Jonathan Myerson	The Canterbury Tales	Nominated	Shared with Christopher Grace
2000	Don Hertzfeldt	Rejected	Nominated	
2012	David Silverman	The Longest Daycare	Nominated	
2015	Don Hertzfeldt	World of Tomorrow	Nominated	
2018	David Fine	Animal Behaviour	Nominated	Shared with Alison Snowden
2022	Pamela Ribon	My Year of Dicks	Nominated	Shared with Sara Gunnarsdóttir
2023	Tal Kantor; Amit R. Gicelter	Letter to a Pig	Nominated	

== Best Live Action Short Film ==
Best Live Action Short Film
Year	Name	Film	Status	Milestone / Notes
1934	Jules White	Men in Black	Nominated	Comedy Category
1935	Jules White	Oh, My Nerves	Nominated	Comedy Category
1945	Jules White	The Jury Goes Round 'N' Round	Nominated	Two-Reel Category
1946	Jules White	Hiss and Yell	Nominated	Two-Reel Category
1947	Irving Allen	Climbing the Matterhorn	Won	Two-Reel Category
1949	Irving Allen	Chase of Death	Nominated	Two-Reel Category
1949	Justin Herman	Roller Derby Girl	Nominated	One-Reel Category
1953	Johnny Green	Overture to The Merry Wives of Windsor	Won	One-Reel Category
1954	Denis Sanders; Terry Sanders	A Time Out of War	Won	Two-Reel Category
1954	Johnny Green	The Strauss Fantasy	Nominated	One-Reel Category
1955	Dore Schary	The Battle of Gettysburg	Nominated	Two-Reel Category
1955	Justin Herman	Three Kisses	Nominated	One-Reel Category
1957	Konstantin Kalser	Crashing the Water Barrier	Won	One-Reel Category
1958	James A. Lebenthal	T Is for Tumbleweed	Nominated	
1959	Peter Sellers	The Running Jumping & Standing Still Film	Nominated	
1959	Shirley Clarke	Skyscraper	Nominated	Shared with Willard Van Dyke and Irving Jacoby
1965	Claude Berri	The Chicken	Won	
1965	Lothar Wolff	Fortress of Peace	Nominated	
1966	Marin Karmitz	Turkey the Bridge	Nominated	Shared with Vladimir Forgency
1968	Charles Guggenheim	Robert Kennedy Remembered	Won	
1971	Ron Satlof	Frog Story	Nominated	Shared with Ray Gideon
1974	Julian Chagrin	The Concert	Nominated	Shared with Claude Chagrin
1975	Bert Salzman	Angel and Big Joe	Won	
1975	Louis Marcus	Conquest of Light	Nominated	
1976	Peter Werner	In the Region of Ice	Won	Shared with Andre R. Guttfreund
1976	Julian Chagrin	The Morning Spider	Nominated	Shared with Claude Chagrin
1976	Robin Lehman	Nightlife	Nominated	Shared with Claire Wilbur
1976	Dyan Cannon	Number One	Nominated	Shared with Vince Cannon
1977	Saul Bass	Notes on the Popular Arts	Nominated	
1978	Andrew Sugerman	Mandy's Grandmother	Nominated	
1979	Saul Bass	The Solar Film	Nominated	Shared with Michael Britton
1979	Ross Lowell; Carol Lowell	Oh Brother, My Brother	Nominated	
1979	Larry Hankin	Solly's Diner	Nominated	Shared with Harry Mathias and Jay Zukerman
1981	Shelley Levinson	Violet	Won	Shared with Paul Kemp
1984	Lesli Linka Glatter	Tales of Meeting and Parting	Nominated	Shared with Sharon Oreck
1986	Fredda Weiss	Love Struck	Nominated	
1989	Jonathan Tammuz	The Childeater	Nominated	
1990	Adam Davidson	The Lunch Date	Won	
1993	Jonathan Penner	Down on the Waterfront	Nominated	Shared with Stacy Title
1993	Susan Seidelman	The Dutch Master	Nominated	Shared with Jonathan Brett
1995	Jeff Goldblum	Little Surprises	Nominated	Shared with Tikki Goldberg
1996	David Frankel	Dear Diary	Won	Shared with Barry Jossen
2000	Peter Riegert	By Courier	Nominated	Shared with Ericka Frederick
2003	Aaron Schneider	Two Soldiers	Nominated	Shared with Andrew J. Sacks
2004	Taika Waititi	Two Cars, One Night	Nominated	Shared with Ainsley Gardiner
2006	Ari Sandel	West Bank Story	Won	
2014	Oded Binnun; Mihal Brezis	Aya	Nominated	
2018	Guy Nattiv; Jaime Ray Newman	Skin	Won	
2020/2021	Tomer Shushan; Shira Hochman	White Eye	Nominated	
2023	Steven Rales	The Wonderful Story of Henry Sugar	Won	Shared with Wes Anderson
2025	Meyer Levinson-Blount; Oron Caspi	Butcher's Stain	Nominated	

== Best Sound ==
Best Sound
Year	Name	Film	Status	Milestone / Notes
1932/1933	Nathan Levinson	42nd Street	Nominated	
1932/1933	Nathan Levinson	Gold Diggers of 1933	Nominated	
1932/1933	Nathan Levinson	I Am a Fugitive from a Chain Gang	Nominated	
1934	Nathan Levinson	Flirtation Walk	Nominated	
1935	Nathan Levinson	Captain Blood	Nominated	
1935	Gilbert Kurland	Bride of Frankenstein	Nominated	
1936	Nathan Levinson	The Charge of the Light Brigade	Nominated	
1937	Nathan Levinson	The Life of Emile Zola	Nominated	
1938	Nathan Levinson	Four Daughters	Nominated	
1939	Nathan Levinson	The Private Lives of Elizabeth and Essex	Nominated	
1940	Nathan Levinson	The Sea Hawk	Nominated	
1941	Nathan Levinson	Sergeant York	Nominated	
1942	Nathan Levinson	Yankee Doodle Dandy	Won	
1942	Daniel J. Bloomberg	Flying Tigers	Nominated	
1943	Nathan Levinson	This Is the Army	Nominated	
1943	Daniel J. Bloomberg	In Old Oklahoma	Nominated	
1944	Nathan Levinson	Hollywood Canteen	Nominated	
1944	Daniel J. Bloomberg	Brazil	Nominated	
1945	Nathan Levinson	Rhapsody in Blue	Nominated	
1945	Daniel J. Bloomberg	Flame of Barbary Coast	Nominated	
1948	Nathan Levinson	Johnny Belinda	Nominated	
1948	Daniel J. Bloomberg	Moonrise	Nominated	
1949	Daniel J. Bloomberg	Sands of Iwo Jima	Nominated	
1951	Nathan Levinson	A Streetcar Named Desire	Nominated	
1952	Daniel J. Bloomberg	The Quiet Man	Nominated	
1978	Joel Fein	The Buddy Holly Story	Nominated	Shared with Tex Rudloff, Curly Thirlwell, and Willie D. Burton
1979	Mark Berger	Apocalypse Now	Won	Shared with Walter Murch, Richard Beggs, and Nat Boxer
1980	Les Lazarowitz	Raging Bull	Nominated	Shared with Donald O. Mitchell, Bill Nicholson, and David J. Kimball
1981	David M. Ronne	On Golden Pond	Nominated	Shared with Richard Portman
1981	Tom Fleischman	Reds	Nominated	Shared with Dick Vorisek and Simon Kaye
1982	Les Lazarowitz	Tootsie	Nominated	Shared with Arthur Piantadosi, Les Fresholtz, and Dick Alexander
1983	Mark Berger	The Right Stuff	Won	Shared with Tom Scott, Randy Thom, and David MacMillan
1983	Jay Boekelheide	The Right Stuff	Won	Sound Editing Category.
1983	Todd Boekelheide	Never Cry Wolf	Nominated	Shared with Alan Splet, Randy Thom, and David Parker
1984	Mark Berger; Todd Boekelheide	Amadeus	Won	Shared with Tom Scott and Chris Newman
1984	David M. Ronne	The River	Nominated	Shared with Nick Alphin, Robert Thirlwell, and Richard Portman
1985	David M. Ronne	Silverado	Nominated	Shared with Donald O. Mitchell, Rick Kline, and Kevin O'Connell
1991	Tom Fleischman	The Silence of the Lambs	Nominated	Shared with Chris Newman
1992	David E. Stone	Bram Stoker's Dracula	Won	Sound Editing Category. Shared with Tom McCarthy
1996	Mark Berger	The English Patient	Won	Shared with Walter Murch, David Parker, and Chris Newman
1996	Jeff Wexler	Independence Day	Nominated	Shared with Chris Carpenter, Bill W. Benton, and Bob Beemer
1997	Mark Ulano	Titanic	Won	Shared with Gary Rydstrom, Tom Johnson, and Gary Summers
2002	Tom Fleischman	Gangs of New York	Nominated	Shared with Eugene Gearty and Ivan Sharrock
2003	Jeff Wexler	The Last Samurai	Nominated	Shared with Andy Nelson and Anna Behlmer
2004	Tom Fleischman	The Aviator	Nominated	Shared with Petur Hliddal
2008	Lora Hirschberg	The Dark Knight	Nominated	Shared with Gary Rizzo and Ed Novick
2009	Mark Ulano	Inglourious Basterds	Nominated	Shared with Michael Minkler and Tony Lamberti
2010	Lora Hirschberg	Inception	Won	Shared with Gary Rizzo and Ed Novick
2011	Tom Fleischman	Hugo	Won	Shared with John Midgley
2013	Niv Adiri	Gravity	Won	Shared with Skip Lievsay, Christopher Benstead, and Chris Munro
2019	Mark Ulano	Ad Astra	Nominated	Shared with Gary Rydstrom and Tom Johnson
2019	Mark Ulano	Once Upon a Time in Hollywood	Nominated	Shared with Michael Minkler and Christian P. Minkler
2021	Niv Adiri	Belfast	Nominated	Shared with Denise Yarde, Simon Chase, and James Mather

== Best Story ==
Best Story
Year	Name	Film	Status	Milestone / Notes
1927/1928	Ben Hecht	Underworld	Won	
1927/1928	Lajos Bíró	The Last Command	Nominated	
1930/1932	Kubec Glasmon	The Public Enemy	Nominated	Shared with John Bright
1934	Arthur Caesar	Manhattan Melodrama	Won	
1934	Norman Krasna	The Richest Girl in the World	Nominated	
1935	Ben Hecht	The Scoundrel	Won	Shared with Charles MacArthur
1935	Moss Hart	Broadway Melody of 1936	Nominated	
1936	Norman Krasna	Fury	Nominated	
1937	Heinz Herald; Geza Herczeg	The Life of Emile Zola	Nominated	
1938	Dore Schary	Boys Town	Won	Shared with Eleanore Griffin
1938	Irving Berlin	Alexander's Ragtime Band	Nominated	
1938	John Howard Lawson	Blockade	Nominated	
1938	Frederick Kohner	Mad About Music	Nominated	Shared with Marcella Burke
1939	Felix Jackson	Bachelor Mother	Nominated	
1939	Melchior Lengyel	Ninotchka	Nominated	
1940	Benjamin Glazer	Arise, My Love	Won	Shared with John Toldy
1940	Dore Schary	Edison, the Man	Nominated	Shared with Hugo Butler
1940	Bella and Samuel Spewack	My Favorite Wife	Nominated	Shared with Leo McCarey
1941	Harry Segall	Here Comes Mr. Jordan	Won	
1941	Billy Wilder	Ball of Fire	Nominated	Shared with Thomas Monroe
1942	Emeric Pressburger	The Invaders	Won	
1942	Irving Berlin	Holiday Inn	Nominated	
1942	Sidney Harmon	The Talk of the Town	Nominated	
1945	Alvah Bessie	Objective, Burma!	Nominated	
1946	Vladimir Pozner	The Dark Mirror	Nominated	
1946	Victor Trivas	The Stranger	Nominated	
1947	Herbert Clyde Lewis	It Happened on 5th Avenue	Nominated	Shared with Frederick Stephani
1947	Eleazar Lipsky	Kiss of Death	Nominated	
1947	Dorothy Parker	Smash-Up, the Story of a Woman	Nominated	Shared with Frank Cavett
1948	Emeric Pressburger	The Red Shoes	Nominated	
1950	Leonard Spigelgass	Mystery Street	Nominated	
1950	Sy Gomberg	When Willie Comes Marching Home	Nominated	
1951	Robert Riskin	Here Comes the Groom	Nominated	Shared with Liam O'Brien
1951	Alfred Hayes; Stewart Stern	Teresa	Nominated	
1953	Ray Ashley; Morris Engel; Ruth Orkin	Little Fugitive	Nominated	
1954	Philip Yordan	Broken Lance	Won	
1954	Jed Harris	Night People	Nominated	Shared with Tom Reed
1955	Daniel Fuchs	Love Me or Leave Me	Won	

Note: Defunct category.

== Best Visual Effects ==
Best Visual Effects
Year	Name	Film	Status	Milestone / Notes
1939	Nathan Levinson	The Private Lives of Elizabeth and Essex	Nominated	Shared with Byron Haskin
1940	Nathan Levinson	The Sea Hawk	Nominated	Shared with Byron Haskin
1941	Nathan Levinson	~~Dive Bomber~~ (Nomination withdrawn)	Nominated	Shared with Byron Haskin
1941	Nathan Levinson	The Sea Wolf	Nominated	Shared with Byron Haskin
1942	Nathan Levinson	Desperate Journey	Won	Shared with Byron Haskin
1942	Daniel J. Bloomberg	Flying Tigers	Nominated	Shared with Howard Lydecker
1943	Nathan Levinson	Air Force	Nominated	Shared with H. F. Koenekamp and Rex Wimpy
1944	Nathan Levinson	The Adventures of Mark Twain	Nominated	Shared with Paul Detlefsen and John Crouse
1945	Sol Halperin	Captain Eddie	Nominated	Shared with Fred Sersen, Roger Heman Sr., and Harry M. Leonard
1946	Nathan Levinson	A Stolen Life	Nominated	Shared with William C. McGann
1968	Stanley Kubrick	2001: A Space Odyssey	Won	
1986	Stan Winston	Aliens	Won	Shared with Robert Skotak, John Richardson, and Suzanne M. Benson
1987	Stan Winston; Robert M. Greenberg; Richard Greenberg	Predator	Nominated	Shared with Joel Hynek
1991	Stan Winston	Terminator 2: Judgment Day	Won	Shared with Dennis Muren, Gene Warren Jr., and Robert Skotak
1991	Mikael Salomon	Backdraft	Nominated	Shared with Allen Hall, Clay Pinney, and Scott Farrar
1993	Stan Winston	Jurassic Park	Won	Shared with Dennis Muren, Phil Tippett, and Michael Lantieri
1994	Stephen Rosenbaum	Forrest Gump	Won	Shared with Ken Ralston, George Murphy, and Allen Hall
1997	Stan Winston	The Lost World: Jurassic Park	Nominated	Shared with Dennis Muren, Randal M. Dutra, and Michael Lantieri
2001	Stan Winston	A.I. Artificial Intelligence	Nominated	Shared with Dennis Muren, Scott Farrar, and Michael Lantieri
2009	Stephen Rosenbaum	Avatar	Won	Shared with Joe Letteri, Richard Baneham, and Andrew R. Jones
2009	Dan Kaufman	District 9	Nominated	Shared with Peter Muyzers, Robert Habros, and Matt Aitken
2016	Brad Schiff	Kubo and the Two Strings	Nominated	Shared with Steve Emerson, Oliver Jones, and Brian McLean
2017	Stephen Rosenbaum	Kong: Skull Island	Nominated	Shared with Jeff White, Scott Benza, and Mike Meinardus

== Best Writing (Adapted Screenplay) ==
Best Adapted Screenplay
Year	Name	Film	Adapted From	Status	Milestone / Notes
1927/1928	Benjamin Glazer	7th Heaven	The play Seventh Heaven by Austin Strong	Won	
1927/1928	Alfred A. Cohn	The Jazz Singer	The play by Samson Raphaelson, from his story "The Day of Atonement"	Nominated	
1930/1931	Joseph L. Mankiewicz	Skippy	The comic strip by Percy Crosby	Nominated	Shared with Sam Mintz
1931/1932	Samuel Hoffenstein	Dr. Jekyll and Mr. Hyde	The novel by Robert Louis Stevenson	Nominated	Shared with Percy Heath
1932/1933	Robert Riskin	Lady for a Day	The story Madame la Gimp by Damon Runyon	Nominated	
1932/1933	Sonya Levien	State Fair	The novel by Phil Stong	Nominated	Shared with Paul Green
1934	Robert Riskin	It Happened One Night	The story Night Bus by Samuel Hopkins Adams	Won	
1934	Frances Goodrich	The Thin Man	The novel by Dashiell Hammett	Nominated	Shared with Albert Hackett
1934	Ben Hecht	Viva Villa!	The book by Edgecumb Pinchon and O. B. State	Nominated	
1936	Robert Riskin	Mr. Deeds Goes to Town	The story Opera Hat by Clarence Budington Kelland	Nominated	
1936	Frances Goodrich	After the Thin Man	A story by Dashiell Hammett	Nominated	Shared with Albert Hackett
1936	Morrie Ryskind	My Man Godfrey	The story 1101 Park Avenue by Eric S. Hatch	Nominated	Shared with Eric S. Hatch
1937	Heinz Herald; Geza Herczeg	The Life of Emile Zola	The book Zola and His Time by Matthew Josephson	Won	Shared with Norman Reilly Raine
1937	Viña Delmar	The Awful Truth	The play by Arthur Richman	Nominated	
1937	Morrie Ryskind	Stage Door	The play by Edna Ferber and George S. Kaufman	Nominated	Shared with Anthony Veiller
1937	Dorothy Parker; Alan Campbell	A Star Is Born	A story by William A. Wellman and Robert Carson	Nominated	Shared with Robert Carson
1938	Dore Schary	Boys Town	A story by Schary and Eleanore Griffin	Nominated	Shared with John Meehan
1938	Julius J. Epstein	Four Daughters	The short story "Sister Act" by Fannie Hurst	Nominated	Shared with Lenore J. Coffee
1938	Robert Riskin	You Can't Take It with You	The play by George S. Kaufman and Moss Hart	Nominated	
1939	Eric Maschwitz	Goodbye, Mr. Chips	The novel by James Hilton	Nominated	Shared with R. C. Sheriff and Claudine West
1939	Sidney Buchman	Mr. Smith Goes to Washington	A story by Lewis R. Foster	Nominated	
1939	Billy Wilder	Ninotchka	A story by Melchior Lengyel	Nominated	Shared with Charles Brackett and Walter Reisch
1939	Ben Hecht	Wuthering Heights	The novel by Emily Brontë	Nominated	Shared with Charles MacArthur
1941	Sidney Buchman	Here Comes Mr. Jordan	The play Heaven Can Wait by Harry Segall	Won	Shared with Seton I. Miller
1941	Billy Wilder	Hold Back the Dawn	The story Memo to a Movie Producer by Ketti Frings	Nominated	Shared with Charles Brackett
1941	Lillian Hellman	The Little Foxes	The play by Hellman	Nominated	
1942	George Froeschel	Mrs. Miniver	The character Mrs. Miniver from the newspaper columns by Jan Struther	Won	Shared with James Hilton, Claudine West, and Arthur Wimperis
1942	George Froeschel	Random Harvest	The novel by James Hilton	Nominated	Shared with Claudine West and Arthur Wimperis
1942	Rodney Ackland; Emeric Pressburger	49th Parallel	A story by Pressburger	Nominated	
1942	Herman J. Mankiewicz; Jo Swerling	The Pride of the Yankees	A story by Paul Gallico	Nominated	
1942	Sidney Buchman; Irwin Shaw	The Talk of the Town	A story by Sidney Harmon	Nominated	
1943	Julius J. Epstein; Philip G. Epstein; Howard Koch	Casablanca	The play Everybody Comes to Rick's by Murray Burnett and Joan Alison	Won	
1944	Billy Wilder	Double Indemnity	The novel Double Indemnity in Three of a Kind by James M. Cain	Nominated	Shared with Raymond Chandler
1944	Samuel Hoffenstein	Laura	The novel by Vera Caspary	Nominated	Shared with Jay Dratler and Elizabeth Reinhardt
1944	Irving Brecher; Fred F. Finklehoffe	Meet Me in St. Louis	The novel by Sally Benson	Nominated	
1945	Billy Wilder	The Lost Weekend	The novel by Charles R. Jackson	Won	Shared with Charles Brackett
1945	Guy Endore; Leopold Atlas	The Story of G.I. Joe	The books Brave Men and Here Is Your War by Ernie Pyle	Nominated	Shared with Philip Stevenson
1945	Albert Maltz	Pride of the Marines	The novel Al Schmid, Marine by Roger Butterfield	Nominated	
1945	Tess Slesinger	A Tree Grows in Brooklyn	The novel by Betty Smith	Nominated	Posthumous nomination. Shared with Frank Davis
1947	Moss Hart	Gentleman's Agreement	The novel by Laura Z. Hobson	Nominated	
1948	Billy Wilder	A Foreign Affair	A story by David Shaw	Nominated	Shared with Charles Brackett and Richard L. Breen
1948	Frank Partos	The Snake Pit	The novel by Mary Jane Ward	Nominated	Shared with Millen Brand
1949	Joseph L. Mankiewicz	A Letter to Three Wives	The novel Letter to Three Wives by John Klempner	Nominated	
1949	Robert Rossen	All the King's Men	The novel by Robert Penn Warren	Nominated	
1949	Carl Foreman	Champion	The short story by Ring Lardner	Nominated	
1950	Joseph L. Mankiewicz	All About Eve	The short story The Wisdom of Eve by Mary Orr	Won	
1950	Albert Maltz	Broken Arrow	The novel Blood Brother by Elliott Arnold	Nominated	
1950	Frances Goodrich	Father of the Bride	The novel by E. Streeter	Nominated	Shared with Albert Hackett
1951	Robert Wyler; Philip Yordan	Detective Story	The play by Sidney Kingsley	Nominated	
1951	Max Ophüls	La Ronde	The play by Arthur Schnitzler	Nominated	Shared with Jacques Natanson
1952	Carl Foreman	High Noon	The story The Tin Star by John W. Cunningham	Nominated	
1953	Daniel Taradash	From Here to Eternity	The novel by James Jones	Won	
1953	Helen Deutsch	Lili	The story Love of Seven Dolls by Paul Gallico	Nominated	
1954	Ernest Lehman; Samuel A. Taylor; Billy Wilder	Sabrina	The novel Sabrina Fair by Taylor	Nominated	
1954	Frances Goodrich	Seven Brides for Seven Brothers	The story The Sobbin' Women by Stephen Vincent Benét	Nominated	Shared with Albert Hackett and Dorothy Kingsley
1955	Paddy Chayefsky	Marty	The teleplay by Chayefsky	Won	
1955	Richard Brooks	Blackboard Jungle	The novel by Evan Hunter	Nominated	
1955	Daniel Fuchs	Love Me or Leave Me	A story by Fuchs	Nominated	Shared with Isobel Lennart
1956	S. J. Perelman	Around the World in 80 Days	The novel Around the World in Eighty Days by Jules Verne	Won	Shared with John Farrow and James Poe
1956	Norman Corwin	Lust for Life	The novel by Irving Stone	Nominated	
1957	Carl Foreman	The Bridge on the River Kwai	The novel by Pierre Boulle	Won	Shared with Pierre Boulle and Michael Wilson
1958	Alan Jay Lerner	Gigi	The novella by Colette	Won	
1958	Richard Brooks	Cat on a Hot Tin Roof	The play by Tennessee Williams	Nominated	Shared with James Poe
1958	Don Mankiewicz	I Want to Live!	Articles by Edward S. Montgomery and letters by Barbara Graham	Nominated	Shared with Nelson Gidding
1959	I. A. L. Diamond; Billy Wilder	Some Like It Hot	A story by M. Logan and Robert Thoeren	Nominated	
1960	Richard Brooks	Elmer Gantry	The novel by Sinclair Lewis	Won	
1960	Nedrick Young	Inherit the Wind	The play by Jerome Lawrence and Robert E. Lee	Nominated	Shared with Harold Jacob Smith
1961	Abby Mann	Judgment at Nuremberg	The teleplay by Mann	Won	
1961	George Axelrod	Breakfast at Tiffany's	The novella by Truman Capote	Nominated	Jewish father
1961	Carl Foreman	The Guns of Navarone	The novel by Alistair MacLean	Nominated	
1961	Sidney Carroll; Robert Rossen	The Hustler	The novel by Walter Tevis	Nominated	
1961	Ernest Lehman	West Side Story	The play book by Arthur Laurents	Nominated	
1962	Eleanor Perry	David and Lisa	The story Lisa and David by Theodore Isaac Rubin	Nominated	
1963	Henry Ephron; Phoebe Ephron	Captain Newman, M.D.	The novel by Leo Rosten	Nominated	Shared with Richard L. Breen
1963	Harriet Frank Jr. Irving Ravetch	Hud	The novel Horseman, Pass By by Larry McMurtry	Nominated	
1964	Stanley Kubrick	Dr. Strangelove	The novel Red Alert by Peter George	Nominated	Shared with Peter George and Terry Southern
1964	Alan Jay Lerner	My Fair Lady	The musical by Lerner	Nominated	
1965	John Kohn; Stanley Mann	The Collector	The novel by John Fowles	Nominated	
1965	Abby Mann	Ship of Fools	The novel by Katherine Anne Porter	Nominated	
1966	Richard Brooks	The Professionals	The novel A Mule for the Marquesa by Frank O'Rourke	Nominated	
1966	Ernest Lehman	Who's Afraid of Virginia Woolf?	The play by Edward Albee	Nominated	
1967	Buck Henry	The Graduate	The novel by Charles Webb	Nominated	Shared with Calder Willingham
1967	Richard Brooks	In Cold Blood	The novel by Truman Capote	Nominated	
1967	Joseph Strick	Ulysses	The novel by James Joyce	Nominated	Shared with Fred Haines
1968	James Goldman	The Lion in Winter	The play by Goldman	Won	
1968	Neil Simon	The Odd Couple	The play by Simon	Nominated	
1968	Stewart Stern	Rachel, Rachel	The novel A Jest of God by Margaret Laurence	Nominated	
1968	Roman Polanski	Rosemary's Baby	The novel by Ira Levin	Nominated	
1969	Arnold Schulman	Goodbye, Columbus	The novel by Philip Roth	Nominated	
1970	David Zelag Goodman; Renée Taylor	Lovers and Other Strangers	The play Lovers and Other Strangers by Joseph Bologna and Renée Taylor	Nominated	Shared with Joseph Bologna
1970	Larry Kramer	Women in Love	The novel by D. H. Lawrence	Nominated	
1971	Stanley Kubrick	A Clockwork Orange	The novel A Clockwork Orange by Anthony Burgess	Nominated	
1971	Peter Bogdanovich	The Last Picture Show	The novel The Last Picture Show by Larry McMurtry	Nominated	Shared with Larry McMurtry
1972	Julius J. Epstein	Pete 'n' Tillie	The story "Witch's Milk" by Peter De Vries	Nominated	
1973	Robert Towne	The Last Detail	The novel by Darryl Ponicsan	Nominated	
1973	Alvin Sargent	Paper Moon	The novel Addie Pray by Joe David Brown	Nominated	
1973	Norman Wexler	Serpico	The book by Peter Maas	Nominated	Shared with Waldo Salt
1974	Mordecai Richler; Lionel Chetwynd	The Apprenticeship of Duddy Kravitz	The novel by Richler	Nominated	
1974	Mel Brooks; Gene Wilder	Young Frankenstein	The novel Frankenstein by Mary Shelley	Nominated	
1975	Bo Goldman; Lawrence Hauben	One Flew Over the Cuckoo's Nest	The novel by Ken Kesey	Won	
1975	Stanley Kubrick	Barry Lyndon	The novel The Memoirs of Barry Lyndon, Esq. by William Makepeace Thackeray	Nominated	
1975	Neil Simon	The Sunshine Boys	The play The Sunshine Boys by Neil Simon	Nominated	
1976	William Goldman	All the President's Men	The book by Carl Bernstein & Bob Woodward	Won	
1976	Nicholas Meyer	The Seven-Per-Cent Solution	The novel by Meyer	Nominated	
1976	Steve Shagan	Voyage of the Damned	The book by Gordon Thomas and Max Morgan-Witts	Nominated	Shared with David Butler
1977	Alvin Sargent	Julia	The novel Pentimento by Lillian Hellman	Won	
1977	Peter Shaffer	Equus	The play by Shaffer	Nominated	
1977	Larry Gelbart	Oh, God!	The novel by Avery Corman	Nominated	
1978	Oliver Stone	Midnight Express	The book by Billy Hayes and William Hoffer	Won	Jewish father
1978	Neil Simon	California Suite	The play California Suite by Neil Simon	Nominated	
1978	Elaine May	Heaven Can Wait	The play by Harry Segall	Nominated	Shared with Warren Beatty
1979	John Milius	Apocalypse Now	The novel Heart of Darkness by Joseph Conrad	Nominated	Shared with Francis Ford Coppola
1979	Allan Burns	A Little Romance	The novel E=MC2 Mon Amour by Patrick Cauvin	Nominated	
1979	Harriet Frank Jr. Irving Ravetch	Norma Rae	The book Crystal Lee, a Woman of Inheritance by Hank Leiferman	Nominated	
1980	Alvin Sargent	Ordinary People	The novel by Judith Guest	Won	
1981	Harold Pinter	The French Lieutenant's Woman	The novel by John Fowles	Nominated	
1981	Sidney Lumet	Prince of the City	The book Prince of the City: The True Story of a Cop Who Knew Too Much by Robert Daley	Nominated	Shared with Jay Presson Allen
1981	Michael Weller	Ragtime	The novel by E. L. Doctorow	Nominated	
1982	David Mamet	The Verdict	The novel by Barry Reed	Nominated	
1982	Alan J. Pakula	Sophie's Choice	The novel by William Styron	Nominated	
1983	James L. Brooks	Terms of Endearment	The novel by Larry McMurtry	Won	
1983	Harold Pinter	Betrayal	The play by Pinter	Nominated	
1983	Ronald Harwood	The Dresser	The play by Harwood	Nominated	
1983	Julius J. Epstein	Reuben, Reuben	The play Spofford by Herman Shumlin	Nominated	
1984	Peter Shaffer	Amadeus	The play Amadeus by Peter Shaffer	Won	
1984	Robert Towne	Greystoke: The Legend of Tarzan, Lord of the Apes	The novel Tarzan of the Apes by Edgar Rice Burroughs	Nominated	Shared with Michael Austin
1986	Ruth Prawer Jhabvala	A Room with a View	The novel by E. M. Forster	Won	
1986	Mark Medoff	Children of a Lesser God	The play by Medoff	Nominated	Shared with Hesper Anderson
1986	Richard Price	The Color of Money	The novel by Walter Tevis	Nominated	
1987	Stanley Kubrick; Michael Herr	Full Metal Jacket	The novel The Short-Timers by Gustav Hasford	Nominated	Shared with Gustav Hasford
1988	Lawrence Kasdan	The Accidental Tourist	The novel by Anne Tyler	Nominated	Shared with Frank Galati
1988	Philip Kaufman	The Unbearable Lightness of Being	The novel by Milan Kundera	Nominated	Shared with Jean-Claude Carrière
1989	Alfred Uhry	Driving Miss Daisy	The play by Uhry	Won	
1989	Oliver Stone	Born on the Fourth of July	The book by Ron Kovic	Nominated	Shared with Ron Kovic
1989	Paul Mazursky; Roger L. Simon	Enemies, A Love Story	The novel by Isaac Bashevis Singer	Nominated	
1990	Steven Zaillian	Awakenings	The book by Oliver Sacks	Nominated	
1991	Agnieszka Holland	Europa Europa	The book I Was Hitler Youth Salomon by Solomon Perel	Nominated	
1991	Oliver Stone	JFK	The books Crossfire: The Plot That Killed Kennedy by Jim Marrs and On the Trail of the Assassins by Jim Garrison	Nominated	Shared with Zachary Sklar
1992	Ruth Prawer Jhabvala	Howards End	The novel by E. M. Forster	Won	
1992	Michael Tolkin	The Player	The novel by Tolkin	Nominated	
1992	Bo Goldman	Scent of a Woman	The novel Il Buio E Il Miele by Giovanni Arpino & film Profumo di Donna by Ruggero Maccari and Dino Risi	Nominated	
1993	Steven Zaillian	Schindler's List	The novel Schindler's Ark by Thomas Keneally	Won	
1993	Ruth Prawer Jhabvala	The Remains of the Day	The novel by Kazuo Ishiguro	Nominated	
1994	Eric Roth	Forrest Gump	The novel Forrest Gump by Winston Groom	Won	
1995	Michael Radford	Il Postino: The Postman	The novel Ardiente Paciencia by Antonio Skármeta	Nominated	Shared with Anna Pavignano, Furio Scarpelli, Giacomo Scarpelli, and Massimo Troisi
1996	Arthur Miller	The Crucible	The play by Miller	Nominated	
1997	David Mamet	Wag the Dog	The novel American Hero by Larry Beinhart	Nominated	Shared with Hilary Henkin
1998	Scott Frank	Out of Sight	The novel by Elmore Leonard	Nominated	
1998	Elaine May	Primary Colors	The novel by Joe Klein	Nominated	
1999	Michael Mann; Eric Roth	The Insider	The article "The Man Who Knew Too Much" by Marie Brenner	Nominated	
2000	James Schamus	Crouching Tiger, Hidden Dragon	The novel by Wang Dulu	Nominated	Shared with Wang Hui-ling and Kuo Jung Tsai
2000	Ethan Coen; Joel Coen	O Brother, Where Art Thou?	The epic poem Odyssey by Homer	Nominated	
2001	Akiva Goldsman	A Beautiful Mind	The book by Sylvia Nasar	Won	
2001	Daniel Clowes; Terry Zwigoff	Ghost World	The graphic novel by Clowes	Nominated	
2002	Ronald Harwood	The Pianist	The memoir by Władysław Szpilman	Won	
2002	Chris Weitz; Paul Weitz	About a Boy	The novel by Nick Hornby	Nominated	Shared with Peter Hedges. Chris and Paul Weitz's father and maternal grandmother were Jewish.
2002	Charlie Kaufman	Adaptation	The book The Orchid Thief by Susan Orlean	Nominated	Shared with Donald Kaufman, Kaufman's fictional twin brother
2003	Shari Springer Berman	American Splendor	The comic book by Harvey Pekar and Our Cancer Year by Pekar and Joyce Brabner	Nominated	Shared with Robert Pulcini
2003	Gary Ross	Seabiscuit	The book Seabiscuit: An American Legend by Laura Hillenbrand	Nominated	
2005	Dan Futterman	Capote	The book by Gerald Clarke	Nominated	
2005	Tony Kushner; Eric Roth	Munich	The book Vengeance by George Jonas	Nominated	
2006	Sacha Baron Cohen; Todd Phillips; Dan Mazer	Borat	The character Borat Sagdiyev, from the television series Da Ali G Show, created by Sacha Baron Cohen	Nominated	Shared with Peter Baynham and Anthony Hines
2006	Patrick Marber	Notes on a Scandal	The novel by Zoë Heller	Nominated	
2007	Ethan Coen; Joel Coen	No Country for Old Men	The novel No Country for Old Men by Cormac McCarthy	Won	
2007	Sarah Polley	Away from Her	The short story "The Bear Went Over the Mountain" by Alice Munro	Nominated	Jewish father
2007	Ronald Harwood	The Diving Bell and the Butterfly	The book by Jean-Dominique Bauby	Nominated	
2008	Eric Roth	The Curious Case of Benjamin Button	The short story "The Curious Case of Benjamin Button" by F. Scott Fitzgerald	Nominated	Shared with Robin Swicord and Roth Swicord
2009	Jason Reitman	Up in the Air	The novel Up in the Air by Walter Kirn	Nominated	Shared with Sheldon Turner
2010	Aaron Sorkin	The Social Network	The book The Accidental Billionaires by Ben Mezrich	Won	
2010	Lee Unkrich	Toy Story 3	The Toy Story films by Pete Docter, Lasseter, Stanton, et al.	Nominated	Shared with Michael Arndt, John Lasseter, and Andrew Stanton
2010	Debra Granik	Winter's Bone	The novel by Daniel Woodrell	Nominated	Shared with Anne Rosellini
2010	Ethan Coen; Joel Coen	True Grit	The novel True Grit by Charles Portis	Nominated	
2011	Grant Heslov	The Ides of March	The play Farragut North by Beau Willimon	Nominated	Shared with George Clooney and Beau Willimon
2011	Stan Chervin; Aaron Sorkin; Steven Zaillian	Moneyball	The book Moneyball by Michael Lewis	Nominated	
2012	Benh Zeitlin	Beasts of the Southern Wild	The play Juicy and Delicious by Lucy Alibar	Nominated	Zeitlin is of Russian-Jewish descent. Shared with Lucy Alibar
2012	Tony Kushner	Lincoln	The book Team of Rivals: The Political Genius of Abraham Lincoln by Doris Kearns Goodwin	Nominated	
2012	David O. Russell	Silver Linings Playbook	The novel by Matthew Quick	Nominated	
2014	Graham Moore	The Imitation Game	The book Alan Turing: The Enigma by Andrew Hodges	Won	
2017	Aaron Sorkin	Molly's Game	The book Molly's Game: From Hollywood's Elite to Wall Street's Billionaire Boys Club, My High-Stakes Adventure in the World of Underground Poker by Molly Bloom	Nominated	
2017	Scott Neustadter; Michael H. Weber	The Disaster Artist	The book The Disaster Artist: My Life Inside The Room, the Greatest Bad Movie Ever Made by Greg Sestero and Tom Bissell	Nominated	
2017	Scott Frank; Michael Green; James Mangold	Logan	Characters from the X-Men comic books and theatrical motion pictures	Nominated	
2018	David Rabinowitz; Charlie Wachtel	BlacKkKlansman	The memoir Black Klansman by Ron Stallworth	Won	Shared with Spike Lee and Kevin Willmott
2018	Ethan Coen; Joel Coen	The Ballad of Buster Scruggs	The short stories All Gold Canyon by Jack London, & The Gal Who Got Rattled by Stewart Edward White	Nominated	
2018	Nicole Holofcener	Can You Ever Forgive Me?	The memoir by Lee Israel	Nominated	Shared with Jeff Whitty
2018	Eric Roth	A Star is Born	The 1954 film by Moss Hart, 1976 film by Joan Didion, John Gregory Dunne & Frank Pierson, & story by Robert Carson & William A. Wellman	Nominated	Shared with Bradley Cooper and Will Fetters
2019	Taika Waititi	Jojo Rabbit	The novel Caging Skies by Christine Leunens	Won	
2019	Steven Zaillian	The Irishman	The book I Heard You Paint Houses by Charles Brandt	Nominated	
2019	Todd Phillips; Scott Silver	Joker	The characters created by Bill Finger, Bob Kane, and Jerry Robinson	Nominated	
2020/2021	Sacha Baron Cohen; Dan Mazer; Jena Friedman; Lee Kern	Borat Subsequent Moviefilm	The character Borat Sagdiyev by Baron Cohen	Nominated	Shared with Anthony Hines, Dan Swimer, Peter Baynham, and Nina Pedrad
2021	Maggie Gyllenhaal	The Lost Daughter	The novel by Elena Ferrante	Nominated	
2021	Eric Roth	Dune	The novel by Frank Herbert	Nominated	Shared with Jon Spaihts and Denis Villeneuve
2022	Sarah Polley	Women Talking	The novel by Miriam Toews	Won	
2022	Eric Warren Singer; Justin Marks	Top Gun: Maverick	The film Top Gun written by Jim Cash and Jack Epps Jr.	Nominated	Shared with Ehren Kruger, Christopher McQuarrie, and Peter Craig
2023	Noah Baumbach	Barbie	The characters created by Ruth Handler	Nominated	Shared with Greta Gerwig
2023	Jonathan Glazer	The Zone of Interest	The novel by Martin Amis	Nominated	
2024	James Mangold	A Complete Unknown	The book Dylan Goes Electric! by Elijah Wald	Nominated	Shared with Jay Cocks

== Best Writing (Original Screenplay) ==
Best Original Screenplay
Year	Name	Film	Status	Milestone / Notes
1940	Ben Hecht	Angels Over Broadway	Nominated	
1941	Herman Mankiewicz	Citizen Kane	Won	Shared with Orson Welles
1941	Norman Krasna	The Devil and Miss Jones	Nominated	
1941	Howard Koch	Sergeant York	Nominated	Shared with Harry Chandlee, Abem Finkel, and John Huston
1941	Paul Jarrico	Tom, Dick and Harry	Nominated	
1942	Michael Kanin	Woman of the Year	Won	Shared with Ring Lardner Jr.
1942	Emeric Pressburger	One of Our Aircraft Is Missing	Nominated	Shared with Michael Powell
1942	Don Hartman	Road to Morocco	Nominated	Shared with Frank Butler
1942	George Oppenheimer	The War Against Mrs. Hadley	Nominated	
1943	Norman Krasna	Princess O'Rourke	Won	
1943	Lillian Hellman	The North Star	Nominated	
1945	Philip Yordan	Dillinger	Nominated	
1945	Harry Kurnitz	What Next, Corporal Hargrove?	Nominated	
1946	Ben Hecht	Notorious	Nominated	
1946	Melvin Frank	Road to Utopia	Nominated	Shared with Norman Panama
1947	Sidney Sheldon	The Bachelor and the Bobby-Soxer	Won	
1947	Abraham Polonsky	Body and Soul	Nominated	
1947	Garson Kanin	A Double Life	Nominated	Shared with Ruth Gordon
1949	Robert Pirosh	Battleground	Won	
1949	Sidney Buchman	Jolson Sings Again	Nominated	
1949	Alfred Hayes	Paisan	Nominated	Shared with Sergio Amidei, Federico Fellini, Marcello Pagliero, and Roberto Rossellini
1949	Helen Levitt; Sidney Meyers	The Quiet One	Nominated	Shared with Janice Loeb
1950	Billy Wilder	Sunset Boulevard	Won	Shared with Charles Brackett and D.M. Marshman Jr.
1950	Garson Kanin	Adam's Rib	Nominated	Shared with Ruth Gordon
1950	Bernard C. Schoenfeld	Caged	Nominated	Shared with Virginia Kellogg
1950	Carl Foreman	The Men	Nominated	
1950	Joseph L. Mankiewicz	No Way Out	Nominated	Shared with Lesser Samuels
1951	Alan Jay Lerner	An American in Paris	Won	
1951	Billy Wilder	The Big Carnival	Nominated	Shared with Walter Newman and Lesser Samuels
1951	Robert Pirosh	Go for Broke!	Nominated	
1952	Garson Kanin	Pat and Mike	Nominated	Shared with Ruth Gordon
1953	Betty Comden; Adolph Green	The Band Wagon	Nominated	
1954	Budd Schulberg	On the Waterfront	Won	
1954	Joseph L. Mankiewicz	The Barefoot Contessa	Nominated	
1954	Melvin Frank	Knock on Wood	Nominated	Shared with Norman Panama
1955	Sonya Levien; William Ludwig	Interrupted Melody	Won	
1955	Milton Sperling	The Court-Martial of Billy Mitchell	Nominated	Shared with Emmet Lavery
1955	Betty Comden; Adolph Green	It's Always Fair Weather	Nominated	
1955	Melville Shavelson; Jack Rose	The Seven Little Foys	Nominated	
1958	Nedrick Young	The Defiant Ones	Won	Shared with Harold Jacob Smith
1958	Paddy Chayefsky	The Goddess	Nominated	
1958	Melville Shavelson; Jack Rose	Houseboat	Nominated	
1958	Michael Kanin; Fay Kanin	Teacher's Pet	Nominated	
1959	Stanley Shapiro; Maurice Richlin	Pillow Talk	Won	Shared with Clarence Greene and Russell Rouse
1959	Stanley Shapiro; Maurice Richlin	Operation Petticoat	Nominated	Shared with Paul King and Joseph Stone
1959	Ernest Lehman	North by Northwest	Nominated	
1960	Billy Wilder; I. A. L. Diamond	The Apartment	Won	
1960	Melvin Frank	The Facts of Life	Nominated	Shared with Norman Panama
1960	Jules Dassin	Never on Sunday	Nominated	
1961	Stanley Shapiro	Lover Come Back	Nominated	Shared with Paul Henning
1962	Stanley Shapiro	That Touch of Mink	Nominated	Shared with Nate Monaster
1963	Arnold Schulman	Love with the Proper Stranger	Nominated	
1964	Peter Stone	Father Goose	Won	Shared with Frank Tarloff and S. H. Barnett
1965	Frederic Raphael	Darling	Won	
1966	Claude Lelouch	A Man and a Woman	Won	Shared with Pierre Uytterhoeven
1966	Billy Wilder; I. A. L. Diamond	The Fortune Cookie	Nominated	
1967	Norman Lear; Robert Kaufman	Divorce American Style	Nominated	
1967	Frederic Raphael	Two for the Road	Nominated	
1968	Mel Brooks	The Producers	Won	
1968	Gillo Pontecorvo	The Battle of Algiers	Nominated	Shared with Franco Solinas
1968	Peter Ustinov	Hot Millions	Nominated	Shared with Ira Wallach
1968	Stanley Kubrick	2001: A Space Odyssey	Nominated	Shared with Arthur C. Clarke
1969	William Goldman	Butch Cassidy and the Sundance Kid	Won	
1969	Paul Mazursky	Bob & Carol & Ted & Alice	Nominated	Shared with Larry Tucker
1970	Bob Rafelson	Five Easy Pieces	Nominated	Shared with Carole Eastman
1970	Norman Wexler	Joe	Nominated	
1970	Erich Segal	Love Story	Nominated	
1971	Paddy Chayefsky	The Hospital	Won	
1971	Herman Raucher	Summer of '42	Nominated	
1972	Carl Foreman	Young Winston	Nominated	
1973	Gloria Katz	American Graffiti	Nominated	Shared with Willard Huyck and George Lucas
1973	Steve Shagan	Save the Tiger	Nominated	
1973	Melvin Frank; Jack Rose	A Touch of Class	Nominated	
1974	Robert Towne	Chinatown	Won	
1974	Suzanne Schiffman	Day for Night	Nominated	Shared with Jean-Louis Richard and François Truffaut
1974	Josh Greenfeld; Paul Mazursky	Harry and Tonto	Nominated	
1975	Claude Lelouch	And Now My Love	Nominated	Shared with Pierre Uytterhoeven
1975	Ted Allan	Lies My Father Told Me	Nominated	
1975	Robert Towne	Shampoo	Nominated	Shared with Warren Beatty
1976	Paddy Chayefsky	Network	Won	
1976	Walter Bernstein	The Front	Nominated	
1976	Sylvester Stallone	Rocky	Nominated	Jewish maternal grandfather
1977	Woody Allen; Marshall Brickman	Annie Hall	Won	
1977	Neil Simon	The Goodbye Girl	Nominated	
1977	Arthur Laurents	The Turning Point	Nominated	
1978	Louis Garfinkle	The Deer Hunter	Nominated	Shared with Deric Washburn, Michael Cimino, and Quinn Redeker
1978	Woody Allen	Interiors	Nominated	
1978	Paul Mazursky	An Unmarried Woman	Nominated	
1979	Barry Levinson	...And Justice for All.	Nominated	Shared with Valerie Curtin
1979	Woody Allen; Marshall Brickman	Manhattan	Nominated	
1980	Bo Goldman	Melvin and Howard	Won	
1980	Nancy Meyers	Private Benjamin	Nominated	Shared with Harvey Miller and Charles Shyer
1981	Steve Gordon	Arthur	Nominated	
1982	Barry Levinson	Diner	Nominated	
1982	Larry Gelbart; Murray Schisgal	Tootsie	Nominated	Shared with Don McGuire
1983	Lawrence Kasdan	The Big Chill	Nominated	Shared with Barbara Benedek
1983	Nora Ephron	Silkwood	Nominated	Shared with Alice Arlen
1983	Lawrence Lasker; Walter F. Parkes	WarGames	Nominated	
1984	Woody Allen	Broadway Danny Rose	Nominated	
1984	Lowell Ganz; Bruce Jay Friedman; Brian Grazer; Babaloo Mandel	Splash	Nominated	
1985	Bob Gale	Back to the Future	Nominated	Shared with Robert Zemeckis
1985	Tom Stoppard	Brazil	Nominated	Shared with Terry Gilliam and Charles McKeown
1985	Aída Bortnik	The Official Story	Nominated	Shared with Luis Puenzo
1985	Woody Allen	The Purple Rose of Cairo	Nominated	
1986	Woody Allen	Hannah and Her Sisters	Won	
1986	Oliver Stone	Platoon	Nominated	Jewish father
1986	Oliver Stone	Salvador	Nominated	Shared with Richard Boyle
1987	James L. Brooks	Broadcast News	Nominated	
1987	Woody Allen	Radio Days	Nominated	
1988	Gary Ross; Anne Spielberg	Big	Nominated	
1988	Naomi Foner Gyllenhaal	Running on Empty	Nominated	
1989	Tom Schulman	Dead Poets Society	Won	
1989	Woody Allen	Crimes and Misdemeanors	Nominated	
1989	Nora Ephron	When Harry Met Sally...	Nominated	
1990	Bruce Joel Rubin	Ghost	Won	
1990	Woody Allen	Alice	Nominated	
1990	Barry Levinson	Avalon	Nominated	
1991	James Toback	Bugsy	Nominated	
1991	Lawrence Kasdan; Meg Kasdan	Grand Canyon	Nominated	
1992	Woody Allen	Husbands and Wives	Nominated	
1993	Gary Ross	Dave	Nominated	
1993	Nora Ephron	Sleepless in Seattle	Nominated	Shared with Jeff Arch and David S. Ward
1994	Woody Allen	Bullets over Broadway	Nominated	Shared with Douglas McGrath
1995	Woody Allen	Mighty Aphrodite	Nominated	
1995	Oliver Stone	Nixon	Nominated	Shared with Stephen J. Rivele and Christopher Wilkinson
1995	Joel Cohen; Alec Sokolow	Toy Story	Nominated	Shared with Andrew Stanton, Joss Whedon, Pete Docter, John Lasseter, and Joe Ranft
1996	Joel Coen; Ethan Coen	Fargo	Won	
1996	Mike Leigh	Secrets & Lies	Nominated	
1997	James L. Brooks	As Good as It Gets	Nominated	Shared with Mark Andrus
1997	Woody Allen	Deconstructing Harry	Nominated	
1998	Tom Stoppard	Shakespeare in Love	Won	Shared with Marc Norman
1999	Charlie Kaufman	Being John Malkovich	Nominated	
1999	Mike Leigh	Topsy-Turvy	Nominated	
2000	Kenneth Lonergan	You Can Count on Me	Nominated	
2002	Todd Haynes	Far from Heaven	Nominated	
2002	Kenneth Lonergan; Steven Zaillian	Gangs of New York	Nominated	Shared with Jay Cocks
2004	Charlie Kaufman	Eternal Sunshine of the Spotless Mind	Won	Shared with Pierre Bismuth and Michel Gondry
2004	Mike Leigh	Vera Drake	Nominated	
2005	Grant Heslov	Good Night, and Good Luck	Nominated	Shared with George Clooney
2005	Woody Allen	Match Point	Nominated	
2005	Noah Baumbach	The Squid and the Whale	Nominated	Jewish father
2006	Peter Morgan	The Queen	Nominated	Jewish father
2007	Tamara Jenkins	The Savages	Nominated	Jewish father
2008	Mike Leigh	Happy-Go-Lucky	Nominated	
2009	Mark Boal	The Hurt Locker	Won	
2009	Oren Moverman	The Messenger	Nominated	Shared with Alessandro Camon
2009	Joel Coen; Ethan Coen	A Serious Man	Nominated	
2010	David Seidler	The King's Speech	Won	
2010	Mike Leigh	Another Year	Nominated	
2010	Scott Silver	The Fighter	Nominated	Shared with Eric Johnson and Paul Tamasy
2010	Stuart Blumberg; Lisa Cholodenko	The Kids Are All Right	Nominated	
2011	Woody Allen	Midnight in Paris	Won	
2011	Michel Hazanavicius	The Artist	Nominated	
2012	Mark Boal	Zero Dark Thirty	Nominated	
2013	Spike Jonze	Her	Won	
2013	David O. Russell; Eric Warren Singer	American Hustle	Nominated	
2013	Woody Allen	Blue Jasmine	Nominated	
2014	Dan Futterman	Foxcatcher	Nominated	Shared with E. Max Frye
2015	Josh Singer	Spotlight	Won	Shared with Tom McCarthy
2015	Joel Coen; Ethan Coen	Bridge of Spies	Nominated	Shared with Matt Charman
2015	Andrea Berloff; Jonathan Herman	Straight Outta Compton	Nominated	Shared with S. Leigh Savidge and Alan Wenkus
2016	Kenneth Lonergan	Manchester by the Sea	Won	
2019	Noah Baumbach	Marriage Story	Nominated	Jewish father
2019	Sam Mendes	1917	Nominated	Shared with Krysty Wilson-Cairns
2020/2021	Will Berson	Judas and the Black Messiah	Nominated	Shared with Shaka King and Kenny and Keith Lucas
2020/2021	Darius Marder; Abraham Marder	Sound of Metal	Nominated	Shared with Derek Cianfrance
2020/2021	Aaron Sorkin	The Trial of the Chicago 7	Nominated	
2021	David Sirota	Don't Look Up	Nominated	Shared with Adam McKay
2021	Zach Baylin	King Richard	Nominated	
2022	Steven Spielberg; Tony Kushner	The Fabelmans	Nominated	
2023	Josh Singer	Maestro	Nominated	Shared with Bradley Cooper
2024	Jesse Eisenberg	A Real Pain	Nominated	
2025	Robert Kaplow	Blue Moon	Nominated	
2025	Ronald Bronstein; Josh Safdie	Marty Supreme	Nominated	

== Special awards ==
Special Awards
Year	Name	Award	Notes
1938	Harry Warner	Academy Honorary Award	"In recognition of patriotic service in the production of historical short subjects presenting significant episodes in the early struggle of the American people for liberty."
1938	Hal B. Wallis	Irving G. Thalberg Memorial Award	
1939	Douglas Fairbanks	Academy Honorary Award	"Recognizing the unique and outstanding contribution of Douglas Fairbanks, first President of the Academy, to the international development of the motion picture."
1939	David O. Selznick	Irving G. Thalberg Memorial Award	
1943	Hal B. Wallis	Irving G. Thalberg Memorial Award	
1945	Walter Wanger	Academy Honorary Award	"For his six years service as President of the Academy of Motion Picture Arts and Sciences."
1945	Daniel J. Bloomberg	Academy Honorary Award	"For the building of an outstanding musical scoring auditorium which provides optimum recording conditions and combines all elements of acoustic and engineering design." Shared with Republic Studio and the Republic Studio Sound Department
1946	Ernst Lubitsch	Academy Honorary Award	"For his distinguished contributions to the art of the motion picture."
1946	Samuel Goldwyn	Irving G. Thalberg Memorial Award	
1948	Walter Wanger	Academy Honorary Award	"for distinguished service to the industry in adding to its moral stature in the world community by his production of the picture Joan of Arc."
1948	Sid Grauman	Academy Honorary Award	"Master showman, who raised the standard of exhibition of motion pictures."
1948	Adolph Zukor	Academy Honorary Award	"A man who has been called the father of the feature film in America, for his services to the industry over a period of forty years."
1948	Jerry Wald	Irving G. Thalberg Memorial Award	
1949	Fred Astaire	Academy Honorary Award	"For his unique artistry and his contributions to the technique of musical pictures."
1949	Cecil B. DeMille	Academy Honorary Award	"Distinguished motion picture pioneer for 37 years of brilliant showmanship."
1950	Louis B. Mayer	Academy Honorary Award	"For distinguished service to the motion picture industry."
1951	Arthur Freed	Irving G. Thalberg Memorial Award	
1952	Joseph M. Schenck	Academy Honorary Award	"For long and distinguished service to the motion picture industry."
1952	Cecil B. DeMille	Irving G. Thalberg Memorial Award	
1954	Danny Kaye	Academy Honorary Award	"For his unique talents, his service to the Academy, the motion picture industry, and the American people."
1956	Eddie Cantor	Academy Honorary Award	"For distinguished service to the film industry."
1957	Gilbert M. "Broncho Billy" Anderson	Academy Honorary Award	"Motion picture pioneer, for his contributions to the development of motion pictures as entertainment."
1958	Jack L. Warner	Irving G. Thalberg Memorial Award	
1958	Samuel Goldwyn	Jean Hersholt Humanitarian Award	
1961	Jerome Robbins	Academy Honorary Award	"For his brilliant achievements in the art of choreography on film."
1961	Stanley Kramer	Irving G. Thalberg Memorial Award	
1963	Sam Spiegel	Irving G. Thalberg Memorial Award	
1963	Steve Broidy	Jean Hersholt Humanitarian Award	
1965	William Wyler	Irving G. Thalberg Memorial Award	
1967	Arthur Freed	Academy Honorary Award	"For distinguished service to the Academy and the production of six top-rated Awards telecasts."
1969	Cary Grant	Academy Honorary Award	"For his unique mastery of the art of screen acting with the respect and affection of his colleagues."
1970	George Jessel	Jean Hersholt Humanitarian Award	
1972	Edward G. Robinson	Academy Honorary Award	"Who achieved greatness as a player, a patron of the arts and a dedicated citizen...in sum, a Renaissance man. From his friends in the industry he loves." Awarded posthumously.
1973	Groucho Marx	Academy Honorary Award	"In recognition of his brilliant creativity and for the unequalled achievements of the Marx Brothers in the art of motion picture comedy."
1973	Lawrence Weingarten	Irving G. Thalberg Memorial Award	
1974	Lew Wasserman	Jean Hersholt Humanitarian Award	
1975	Mervyn LeRoy	Irving G. Thalberg Memorial Award	
1975	Arthur B. Krim	Jean Hersholt Humanitarian Award	
1976	Pandro S. Berman	Irving G. Thalberg Memorial Award	
1976	Jules C. Stein	Jean Hersholt Humanitarian Award	
1977	Walter Mirisch	Irving G. Thalberg Memorial Award	
1979	Leo Jaffe	Jean Hersholt Humanitarian Award	
1980	Robert Benjamin	Jean Hersholt Humanitarian Award	Awarded posthumously
1982	Danny Kaye	Jean Hersholt Humanitarian Award	
1983	Walter Mirisch	Jean Hersholt Humanitarian Award	
1985	Paul Newman	Academy Honorary Award	"In recognition of his many and memorable compelling screen performances and for his personal integrity and dedication to his craft."
1985	Alex North	Academy Honorary Award	"In recognition of his brilliant artistry in the creation of memorable music for a host of distinguished motion pictures."
1986	Steven Spielberg	Irving G. Thalberg Memorial Award	
1987	Billy Wilder	Irving G. Thalberg Memorial Award	
1990	Howard W. Koch	Jean Hersholt Humanitarian Award	
1993	Elizabeth Taylor	Jean Hersholt Humanitarian Award	Converted to Judaism
1994	Paul Newman	Jean Hersholt Humanitarian Award	
1995	Kirk Douglas	Academy Honorary Award	"For 50 years as a creative and moral force in the motion picture community."
1996	Michael Kidd	Academy Honorary Award	"In recognition of his services to the art of the dance in the art of the screen."
1996	Saul Zaentz	Irving G. Thalberg Memorial Award	
1997	Stanley Donen	Academy Honorary Award	"In appreciation of a body of work marked by grace, elegance, wit and visual innovation."
2000	Ernest Lehman	Academy Honorary Award	"In appreciation of a body of varied and enduring work."
2002	Arthur Hiller	Jean Hersholt Humanitarian Award	
2004	Sidney Lumet	Academy Honorary Award	"In recognition of his brilliant services to screenwriters, performers and the art of the motion picture."
2005	Roger Mayer	Jean Hersholt Humanitarian Award	
2007	Sherry Lansing	Jean Hersholt Humanitarian Award	
2009	Lauren Bacall	Academy Honorary Award	"In recognition of her central place in the Golden Age of motion pictures."
2009	Jerry Lewis	Jean Hersholt Humanitarian Award	
2010	Eli Wallach	Academy Honorary Award	"For a lifetime's worth of indelible screen characters."
2013	Jeffrey Katzenberg	Jean Hersholt Humanitarian Award	
2016	Lynn Stalmaster	Academy Honorary Award	"Over five decades, he applied his talents to more than 200 feature films... and has been instrumental in the careers of celebrated actors."
2016	Frederick Wiseman	Academy Honorary Award	"Wiseman has made one film almost every year since 1967, illuminating lives in the context of social, cultural and government institutions."
2018	Lalo Schifrin	Academy Honorary Award	"In recognition of his unique musical style, compositional integrity and influential contributions to the art of film scoring."
2021	Elaine May	Academy Honorary Award	"For her bold, uncompromising approach to filmmaking, as a writer, director and actress"
2022	Diane Warren	Academy Honorary Award	"for her genius, generosity and passionate commitment to the power of song in film."
2023	Mel Brooks	Academy Honorary Award	"Mel Brooks lights up our hearts with his humor, and his legacy has made a lasting impact on every facet of entertainment"
