= Herzog (surname) =

Herzog is a German-language surname. Notable people with the surname include:

== Academia ==
- Albin Herzog (1852–1909), Swiss mathematician
- Don Herzog (born 1956), American political scientist
- Fred F. Herzog (1907–2008), Austrian-American jurist and academic
- Fritz Herzog (1902–2001), American mathematician
- George Herzog (1901-1983), American ethnomusicologist
- Hal Herzog, American anthrozoologist
- Hanna Herzog (born 1946), sociology professor at Tel Aviv University
- Herta Herzog (1910–2010), Austrian-American social scientist specializing in communication and media research.
- Johann Jakob Herzog (1805–1882), German Protestant theologian
- Marvin Herzog (1927–2013), Yiddish linguist, professor at Columbia University
- Rudolf Herzog (1871–1953), German archeologist
- T. K. G. Herzog (1880–1961), German bryologist and phytogeographer
- Ze'ev Herzog (born 1941), archaeology professor at Tel Aviv University

== Artists, entertainers, film and stage people ==
- Arthur Herzog, Jr. (1900–1983), American jazz songwriter
- George Herzog (1851-1920), German-born, American interior designer
- Hermann Ottomar Herzog (1831–1932), German-American artist
- Jens-Daniel Herzog (born 1964), German stage director
- Mikel Herzog (born 1960), Spanish singer-songwriter
- Rudolph Herzog (born 1973), German film director, producer and writer
- Seth Herzog (born 1970), American comedian
- Werner Herzog (born 1942), German: screenwriter, film director, actor and opera director

== Politicians and religious leaders ==
- Bernhard Herzog (born 1984), Austrian politician
- Chaim Herzog (1918–1997), sixth president of Israel; son of Yitzhak HaLevi Herzog
  - Aura Herzog (1928–2022), wife of Chaim Herzog
- Gustav Herzog (born 1958), German SPD politician, member of the Bundestag
- Henry Herzog (1848–1935), American politician
- Isaac ("Bougie") Herzog (born 1960), eleventh and current president of Israel, son of Chaim Herzog
- Jakob Herzog (1892–1931), Swiss socialist
- J. B. M. Hertzog (1866–1942), German-South African politician
- Martin H. Herzog, (1878–1971), American politician
- Maurice Herzog (1919–2012), French mountaineer and politician
- Otto Herzog (1900–1945), German politician
- Robert Herzog (1823–1886), Polish Roman Catholic bishop
- Roman Herzog (1934–2017), President of Germany from 1994 to 1999
- Ronald Paul Herzog (1942-2019), American Roman Catholic bishop
- Simon Herzog (born 1999), German politician
- Yitzhak HaLevi Herzog (1889–1959), Chief Rabbi of Ireland and later of Israel
- Enrique Múgica Herzog (1932–2020), Spanish politician

== Sportspeople and mountaineers ==
- Andreas Herzog (born 1968), Austrian footballer
- Buck Herzog (1885–1953), American baseball player
- Dieter Herzog (1946–2025), German footballer
- Elvira Herzog (born 2000), Swiss footballer
- Emil Herzog (born 2004), German cyclist
- Maurice Herzog (1919–2012), French mountaineer and politician
- Whitey Herzog (1931–2024), American baseball player and Hall of Fame baseball manager

== Writers and journalists ==
- Amy Herzog, American playwright
- Arthur Herzog (1927–2010), American novelist
- Émile Herzog (1885–1967), Franco-German writer, known by his pen name André Maurois
- Frank Herzog, American retired sportscaster
- Jakob Herzog (writer) (1842–1915), writer, journalist, and dramatist
- Rudolf Herzog (1869–1943), German writer and journalist
- Vladimir Herzog (1937–1975), Jewish-Brazilian journalist
- Wilhelm Herzog (1884–1960), German historian, dramatist and pacifist

== Others ==
- Herzog family of Israeli rabbis and politicians
- Gioacchino Ersoch (born Herzog; 1812–1902), Italian architect
- Jacques Herzog (born 1950), Swiss architect, founder of Herzog & de Meuron
- Karl Herzog (1906–1998), German military officer
- Sofie Herzog (1846–1925), Texas physician
- Todd Herzog (born 1985), winner of Survivor: China

== See also ==
- Ferenc Herczeg (1863–1954), born Franz Herzog, German-Hungarian writer
- Hartsock, an anglicized variant of the Herzog surname.
