= Pierre de Meuron =

Swiss architect (born 1950)

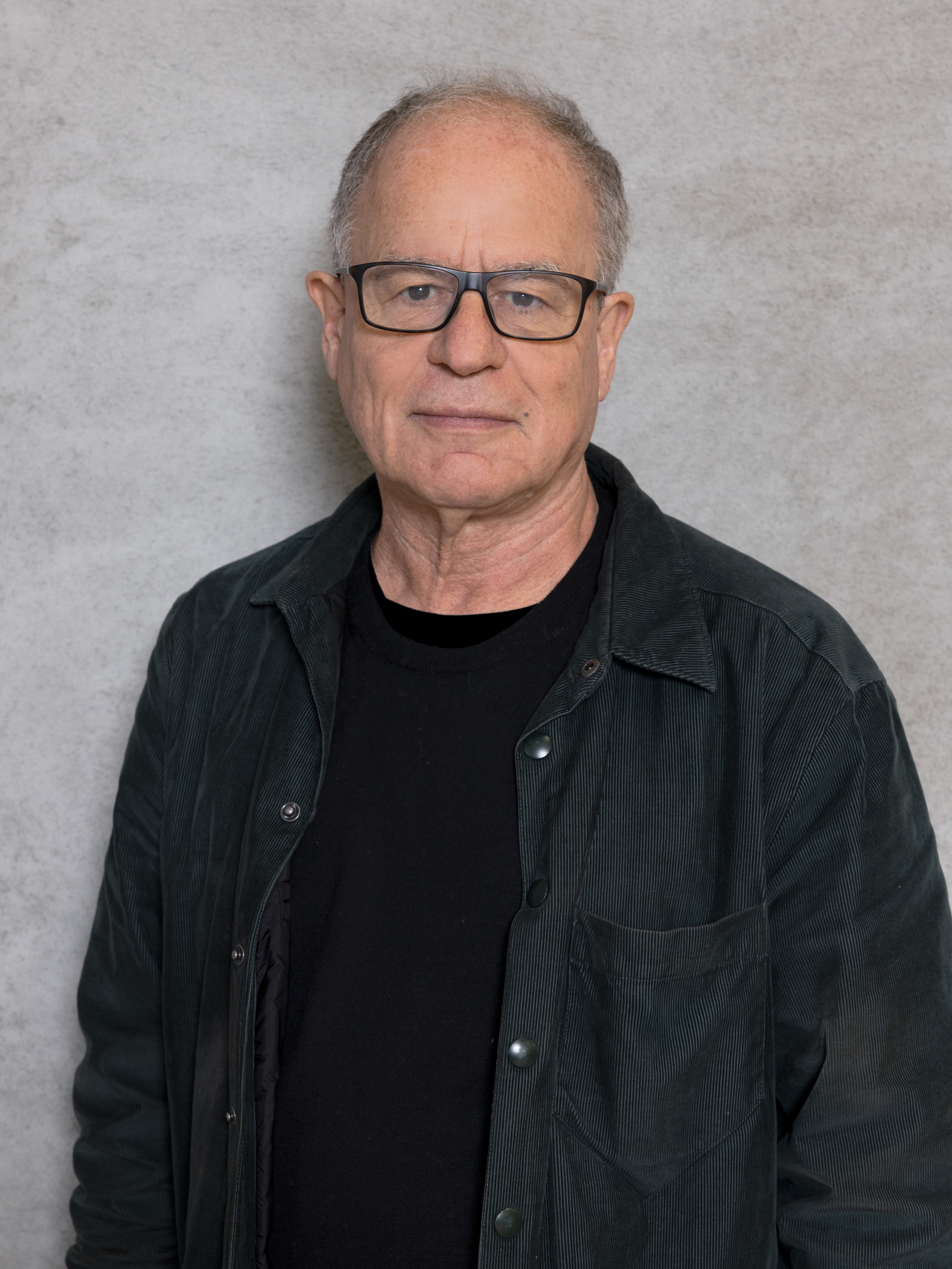
- Born: 8 May 1950 (age 76); Basel, Switzerland
- Education: ETH Zurich; EPFL
- Occupation: Architect
- Years active: 1977–present
- Awards: Pritzker Architecture Prize; Royal Gold Medal
- Practice: Herzog & de Meuron
- Buildings: Tate Modern; Elbphilharmonie; Beijing National Stadium
- Website: www.herzogdemeuron.com

Pierre de Meuron (born 8 May 1950) is a Swiss architect and co-founder, alongside Jacques Herzog, of the architectural firm Herzog & de Meuron.

The firm's projects include the transformation of the Bankside Power Station into the Tate Modern in London, the design of the Elbphilharmonie concert hall in Hamburg, and the creation of the Beijing National Stadium, commonly referred to as the "Bird's Nest", for the 2008 Olympics.

Together with Herzog, de Meuron has received the Pritzker Architecture Prize and the Royal Gold Medal.

== Early life and education ==
De Meuron was born in Basel, Switzerland. He attended grade school alongside Jacques Herzog, who would later become his long-term collaborator and business partner.

De Meuron pursued his architectural studies at the École Polytechnique Fédérale de Lausanne (EPFL) before continuing his education at the Swiss Federal Institute of Technology Zurich (ETH Zurich). In 1978, de Meuron, together with Herzog, co-founded the architectural practice Herzog & de Meuron.

== Career ==
The critic Luis Fernández-Galiano states that Herzog & de Meuron's work is known for combining formal restraint with attention to materials and urban context. According to the Financial Times, a central aspect of their design philosophy is uncovering and revealing the latent potential of existing structures and environments.

Early projects include the Ricola Storage Building in Laufen, Switzerland (1987), which emphasized materiality and texture, and the Dominus Winery in Napa Valley, California (1998), where they incorporated locally sourced stone-filled gabions as a key architectural element.

Their international prominence grew with the transformation of the Bankside Power Station into the Tate Modern in London (2000). Later commissions include the Allianz Arena in Munich (2005) and the Beijing National Stadium—commonly known as the "Bird's Nest"—designed for the 2008 Olympic Games.

== Collaboration with artists ==
Two significant early influences on de Meuron and Herzog were artist Joseph Beuys and architect Aldo Rossi, the latter being their professor during their studies at ETH Zurich. Their friendships with artists have impacted their architectural philosophy, favouring a concept-based approach over a stylistic one. De Meuron, along with Jacques Herzog, initiated Joseph Beuys's involvement in the Basel Carnival (Fasnacht) through the creation of felt suit costumes and the reproduction of other elements of Beuys's installation "Feuerstätte". The physical remnants of that 1978 carnival event have then been piled up, reassembled and transformed – based on a sketch by Beuys – into "Feuerstätte II", a large installation piece which is since then part of the permanent collection of the Kunstmuseum Basel.

== Academia ==
He graduated from ETH Zurich in 1975. He was a visiting professor at Harvard University in 1989 and again from 1994.. From 1999 to 2018, de Meuron and Jacques Herzog served as full professors at ETH Zurich. During this period, they co-founded the ETH Studio Basel – Contemporary City Institute in collaboration with Swiss architect Roger Diener.

The ETH Studio Basel, operational from 1999 to 2018, was a research institute affiliated with ETH Zurich but based in Basel, Switzerland. The institute focused on analyzing contemporary urban transformations and urbanization trends in the 21st century. By integrating architecture, urban planning, and sociology, the research conducted at the institute examined urban development dynamics. Notable studies included research on urbanization in Switzerland and the concept of the "city region" in Europe.

== Approach and focus ==
Since the company's founding, Pierre de Meuron has worked collaboratively with co-founder Jacques Herzog. As stated by Herzog, "Pierre de Meuron and I have always loved trying things out, being experimental – ever since we were in grade school together. It's the way we are. We're curious by nature." Each has brought their specific strengths to the partnership as "a source of some difference to start with in terms of centres of interest, character, and so on." Jacques and Pierre have extended this mode of collaboration to a larger group of partners that have successively joined the practice over the years.

Pierre de Meuron is involved in the competitions as well as the architectural, urban and territorial projects of Herzog & de Meuron since the firm's founding. In a 2022 interview in Le Temps, de Meuron said he believes architecture as a discipline goes beyond formal or technical aspects, but must consider history, social psychology, and geopolitics, and is rooted in the reality of a project. According to the Basler Zeitung, the two founders are gradually transferring ownership of the firm to its partners.

De Meuron also collaborated with Herzog – and occasionally with artists such as Rémy Zaugg or Ai Weiwei – on urbanistic and territorial projects. This work began with an early in-depth study of the Basel metropolitan area, which ultimately led to the foundation of the ETH Studio Basel (1999) together with Roger Diener and Marcel Meili. The focus was the analysis of landscapes and urban territories across the world; the theoretical output was summarized in their publication "The Inevitable Specificity of Cities".

De Meuron has said urban development should engage decision-makers and residents in discussions about shared resources such as land, water, and green space. The Ronquoz 21 master plan in Sion relies on an evolutionary approach to adapt organically to the city's changing needs over time. As the de Meuron notes in Le Nouvelliste, "This project will be carried out progressively, without everything being fixed and set in stone once and for all," ensuring a flexible and phased implementation spanning multiple decades. Bahnknoten Basel, which aims to improve the connection of Basel to its larger metropolitan region; and Cargo Sous Terrain, an underground freight transport system. In the Le Temps interview, he described urban and rural areas as politically, economically and socially interdependent..

De Meuron uses photography as part of his working method. He photographs completed projects to study how they are used, and uses photography as a tool for structural and spatial analysis. He has also maintained an ongoing photographic survey of the Basel metropolitan region as part of his research, which has informed his view that urban development should account for unbuilt space as well as buildings.

== Notable projects ==
- Blue House (1980) – Located in a suburban area in Oberwil, Switzerland, The Blue House features a curved northern concrete block wall and a thin layer of ultramarine paint that creates an impression of fragility.
- Dominus Winery (1998) – Located in Napa Valley, California, this winery is noted for its use of gabion walls filled with local basalt rock.
- Ricola Projects (1987, 1993) – The Ricola Storage Building in Laufen uses translucent polycarbonate panels for diffused lighting, while the Ricola Europe Headquarters in Mulhouse-Brunstatt combines timber cladding with a curved roof to complement the surrounding rural landscape.
- Prada Aoyama Tokyo (2003) – A flagship store in Tokyo's Aoyama district, this building is recognized for its diamond-shaped glass façade with convex and concave panes.
- Tate Modern (2000) – The transformation of a disused power station in London into a modern art museum.
- Beijing National Stadium (2008) – Known as the "Bird's Nest", this structure for the 2008 Summer Olympics features a steel lattice design.
- Elbphilharmonie (2016) – A concert hall in Hamburg featuring a glass structure atop a historic warehouse.
- REHAB Basel (2002) – A specialized rehabilitation center.
- Allianz Arena (2005) – A stadium in Munich known for its façade composed of ETFE plastic panels that change color.
- 1111 Lincoln Road (2010) – A mixed-use development in Miami Beach featuring a reimagined parking garage that functions as a space for retail, dining, and events.
- M+ Museum (2021) – A cultural institution in Hong Kong's West Kowloon Cultural District, featuring an inverted T-shaped design that integrates gallery spaces with research facilities, and houses the Uli Sigg collection of Chinese art.
- Kinderspital Zürich (2024) – A children's hospital.

== Jacques Herzog und Pierre de Meuron Kabinett ==
The Kabinett is a charitable foundation established in Basel in 2015 to preserve and manage the extensive archives of Jacques Herzog and Pierre de Meuron. It holds architectural drawings, sketches, models, and personal collections related to the firm's work.

The foundation is structured around three key areas: architecture, art, and photography, encompassing a wide range of materials and collections. Among its notable holdings is the photography archive of Ruth and Peter Herzog, which includes an extensive collection of historical images. Although the Kabinett is not open to the general public, it offers access to researchers and specialists by appointment.

== Object design ==
In addition to their architectural practice, Herzog & de Meuron have developed a range of object designs, which includes furniture, lighting, jewelry, and cutlery. Since the firm's founding in 1978, they have designed over 400 objects, many of which were conceived as integral elements within their architectural projects, while others function as standalone design pieces.

A design in their collection is the "Unterlinden" lamp, developed in collaboration with the Italian lighting company Artemide. This compact lamp features an aluminum head with an industrial aesthetic, integrating advanced LED technology for energy-efficient illumination.

In addition to standalone pieces, the firm has designed custom furniture and objects for many of their architectural projects, including bespoke door handles, lighting fixtures, and seating.

== Awards and honors ==
Awards include:

- 2001 – Pritzker Architecture Prize (with Jacques Herzog)
- 2007 – Royal Gold Medal, RIBA
- 2007 – Praemium Imperiale
- 2014 – Mies Crown Hall Americas Prize, for 1111 Lincoln Road.

Additionally, they have been awarded honorary doctorates from several institutions:

- University of Basel (2000), in recognition of their contributions to architecture and urbanism.
- Royal College of Art (2016), acknowledging their role in advancing design and architectural education.
- Technical University of Munich (2018), for their pioneering contributions to contemporary architecture.
