= Hartzog =

Hartzog is a German surname. It is a variant of Herzog. Notable people with the surname include:

- Corey Hartzog, American voice actor
- George B. Hartzog Jr. (1920–2008), American attorney
- Henry Simms Hartzog (1866–1953), American academic and school administrator
- Malcolm Hartzog, American college football safety
- Melanie Hartzog, American social services administrator
- William W. Hartzog (1941–2020), American general
- W. Lawrence Hartzog Sr. (1930–2004), American entrepreneur
