= General Herzog (disambiguation) =

Hans Herzog (1819–1894) was a Swiss Army general. General Herzog may also refer to:

- Chaim Herzog (1918–1997), Israeli Defence Forces major general
- Karl Herzog (1906–1998), German Wehrmacht major general
- Kurt Herzog (1889–1948), German Wehrmacht general
