= Herzog =

Hereditary title in medieval Germany

Herzog (pronounced [ˈhɛʁtsoːk]; feminine Herzogin [ˈhɛʁtsoːɡɪn]; masculine plural Herzöge; feminine plural Herzoginnen) is a German hereditary title held by one who rules a territorial duchy, exercises feudal authority over an estate called a duchy, or possesses a right by law or tradition to be referred to by the ducal title. The word is usually translated by the English duke and the Latin dux. Generally, a Herzog ranks below a king and above a Graf ('count'). Whether the title is deemed higher or lower than titles translated into English as prince (Fürst) is dependent upon the language, country, and era in which the titles coexisted.

== History ==
Herzog is not related to Herz (lit. 'heart'), but is derived from the Middle High German Her- meaning 'army' and -zog meaning 'to move' or 'to pull' (related to the modern English verb tug), a military leader (compare to Slavic voivode). Her and zog are roots of the modern German words Heer and ziehen of the same meanings (also: in die Schlacht ziehen, 'to go into battle'). It may have originated from the Proto-Germanic Harjatugô, a warrior who was elected to be a battle leader by their tribes. Thus, Herzog was a title borne by Germanic warriors who exercised military authority over a tribe by general acclaim among its members or warriors, especially in the stem duchies.

During the medieval era, some of the most powerful vassals whose territories lay within the boundaries of the Holy Roman Empire took or were granted the title of Herzog by the Holy Roman Emperor. Several dynasties, such as the Habsburgs of Austria, Hohenzollerns of Prussia, Welfs of Hanover, Wettins of Saxony, Wittelsbachs of Bavaria, and the House of Württemberg, held the Herzogswürde ('dukedom') before becoming kings.

Although a Herzog ranked below a Kurfürst ('prince-elector') within the Empire, he also belonged by hereditary right to the Fürstenbank ('Chamber of Princes,' lit. 'princely seat') within the Reichstag, exercised Landeshoheit within his imperial state, and enjoyed Reichsunmittelbarkeit within the Empire. Therefore, Herzöge were regarded as members of the hoher Adel (lit. 'high nobility') whose families inter-married with sovereign dynasties outside as well as within the Empire. They ranked as royalty, distinct from nobles who were subject to a lesser suzerain than the Emperor.

Occasionally, the Emperor conferred the title of Herzog on a nobleman who was not necessarily a Prince of the Holy Roman Empire and did not rule a duchy. Such a person ranked only as a Titularherzog ('duke-by-title') of the German non-reigning nobility.

Herzogskrone, the heraldic crown of a Herzog

Herzogshut, the ducal hat of a Herzog

== Current usage ==
Herzog is the root of many words of the same meaning in other Germanic languages, including Danish and Norwegian hertug, Dutch and Afrikaans hertog, Icelandic hertogi, Luxembourgish Herzog, and Swedish hertig.

Herzog was borrowed into other European language families with the meanings "prince" and "duke." Examples include the Balto-Slavic languages, as in the Belarusian hiercah (герцаг), Eastern Herzegovinian herceg (херцег; e.g. Herzegovina), Bulgarian khertsog (херцог), Latvian hercogs, Lithuanian hercogas, and Russian gertsog (герцог); the Finno-Ugric languages, as in the Estonian hertsog, Finnish herttua, and Hungarian herceg; and the Kartvelian languages, as in the Georgian herts’ogi (ჰერცოგი).

The semantic equivalent of Herzog in Slavic languages is voivode or воевода, where voi- means 'army' and -vode means 'to lead' or 'to guide.' Both the Germanic and Slavic terms are used for place names within the Slavic-speaking world, as with the historical region of Herzegovina in modern Bosnia and Herzegovina and the autonomous province of Vojvodina in Serbia.

Herzog is not uncommon as a surname in German-speaking countries. The surname does not indicate an aristocratic origin, much like the family name King in English does not indicate royal ancestry. Among notable people with this surname, most are born of Swiss or German origin. A number are Israeli, such as current Israeli president Isaac Herzog.

== See also ==
- Dukes in Italy, Germany and Austria
- Voivode
- König
- German nobility
- German honorifics
- Herzog (surname)
