= Jesús Silva Herzog =

Mexican economist

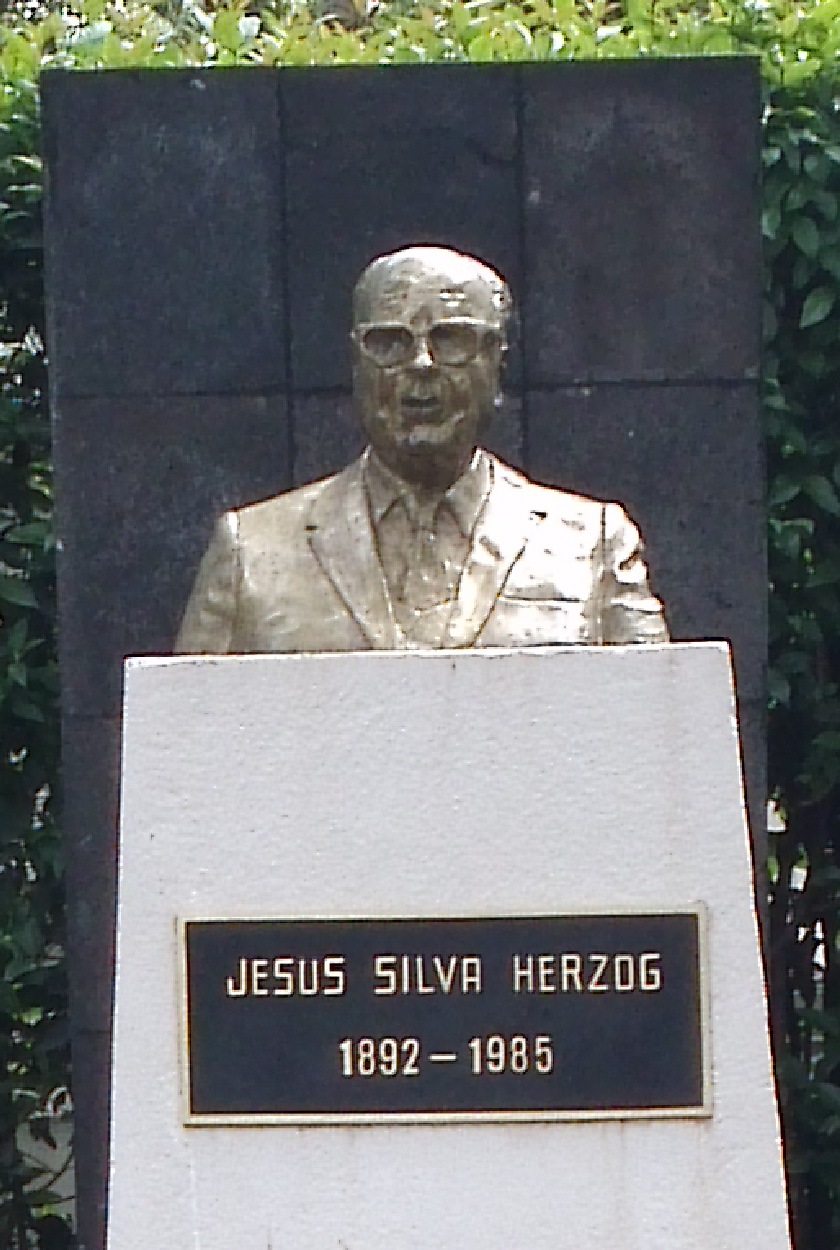
- Bust of Jesús Silva Herzog.
- Born: 14 November 1892; San Luis Potosí, San Luis Potosí, Mexico
- Died: 13 March 1985 (aged 92); Mexico City, Mexico
- Occupations: Economist; historian
- Employer(s): Fondo de Cultura Económica, National Autonomous University of Mexico
- Known for: Studies of the Mexican Revolution
- Children: Jesús Silva Herzog Flores

Jesús Silva Herzog (Note: In this Mexican name, the surname is Silva and the second or maternal family name is Herzog.) (14 November 1892 – 13 March 1985) was a Mexican economist and historian specialized in the Mexican Revolution and a member of the National College. He received the National Prize for Arts and Sciences in 1962. His son, former secretary of finance Jesús Silva Herzog Flores, and grandson, Jesús Silva Herzog Márquez, are also prominent in Mexico's political and intellectual life.
