= Hartsock =

Hartsock is an American surname possibly derived from Herzog. Notable people with the surname include:

- Ben Hartsock (born 1980), American football player
- Ernest Hartsock (1903–1930), American poet
- Jeff Hartsock (born 1966), American baseball player
- Marcia K. Hartsock (1941–2012), Guamanian politician
- Nancy Hartsock (1943–2015), American philosopher
- Robert W. Hartsock (1945–1969), American soldier and Medal of Honor recipient
