= Hartz Chicken =

Fast food chain

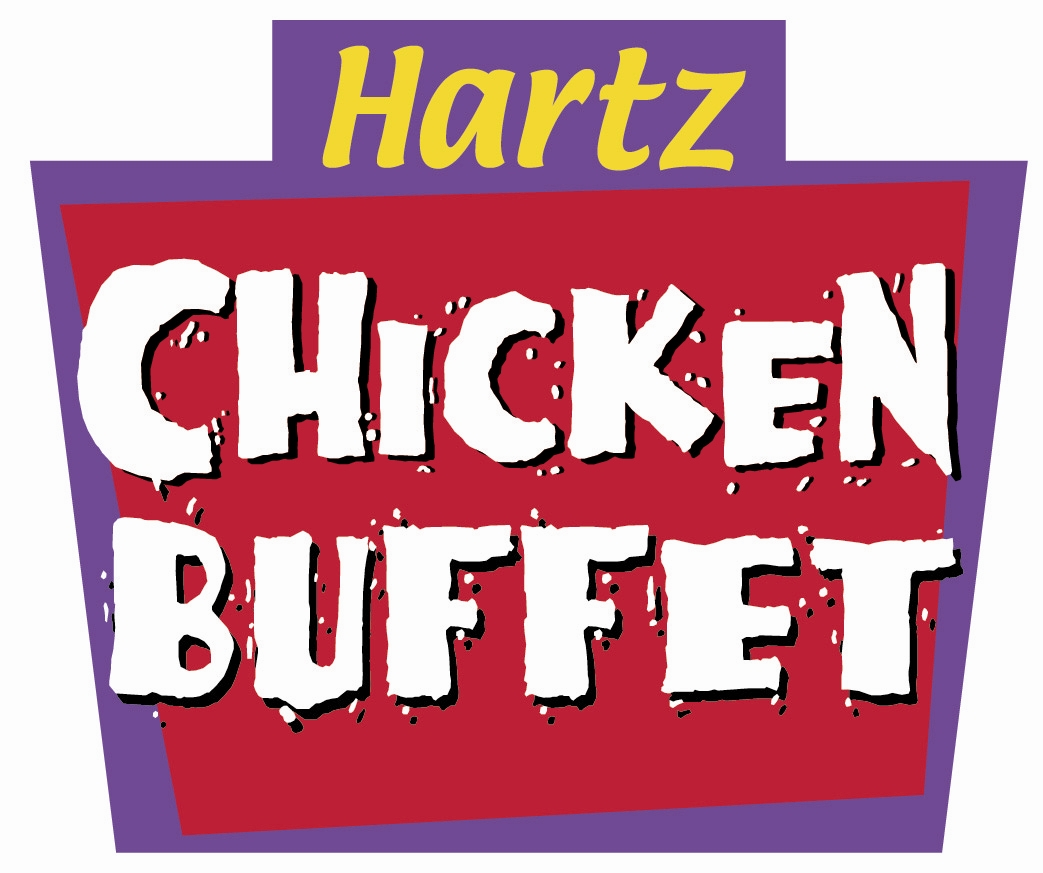
- Trade name: Hartz Chicken Buffet
- Company type: Private
- Industry: Food
- Founded: 1972; 53 years ago in Texas, United States
- Founder: W. Lawrence Hartzog Sr.
- Headquarters: Spring, Texas, United States
- Area served: North America, Malaysia
- Products: Fast food, including fried chicken, french fries, yeast rolls, fried fish and salads, hot vegetables, hot soup and ice-cream.
- Owner: Hartz Franchise Restaurants, Ltd
- Website: hartz-chicken.com

Hartz Chicken (also known as Hartz Chicken Buffet and Hartz Krispy Chicken 'N' Rolls) is an American fast food restaurant chain specializing in fried chicken. The company supplies more than 60 locations in Texas, mostly around the Houston metropolitan area, and Malaysia, as well as one restaurant in Shreveport, LA.

== History ==
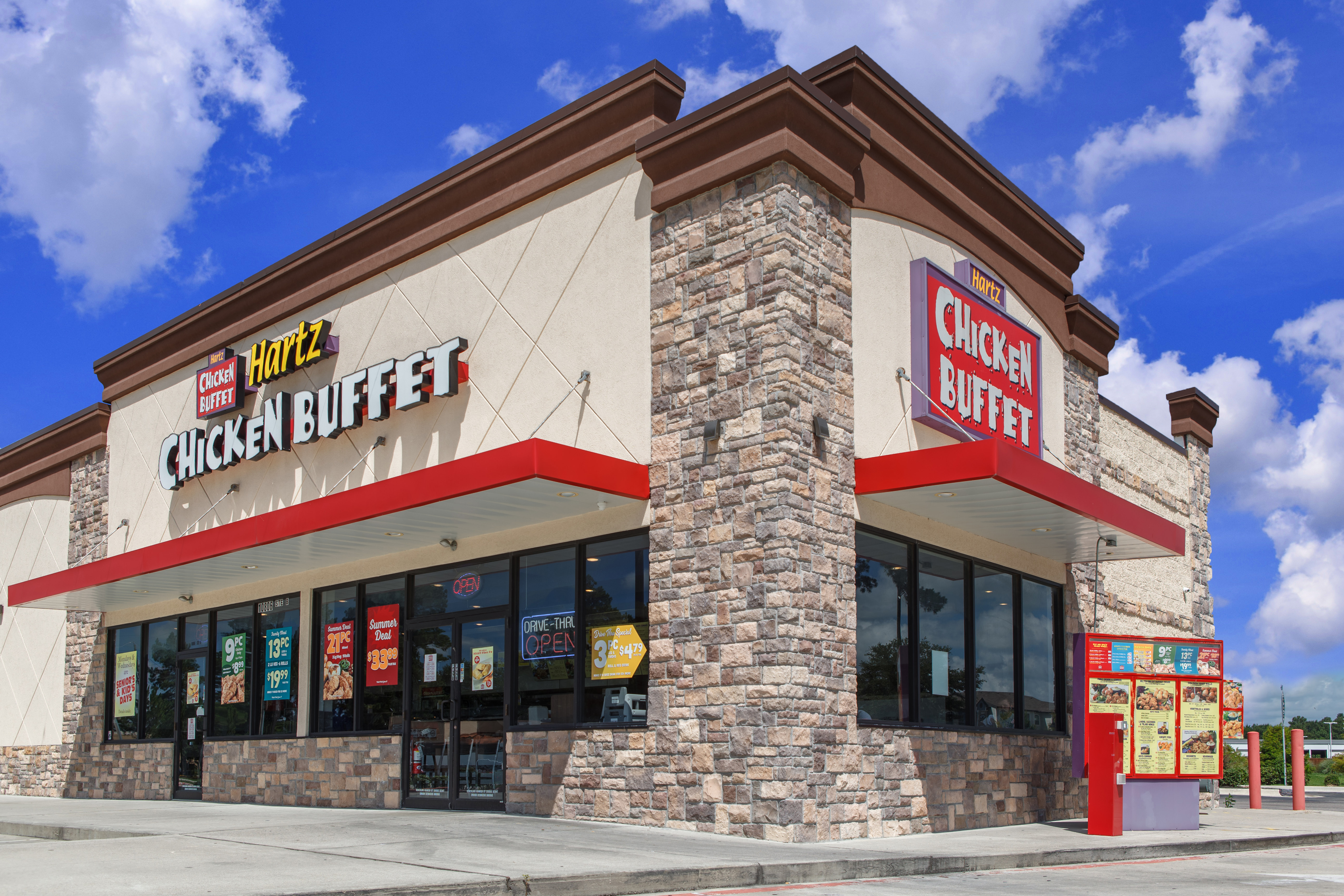
Hartz Chicken Buffet in Tomball, Texas

W. Lawrence Hartzog Sr., who was a friend of Colonel Sanders of KFC, started Hartz Chicken under Hartzog Inc. in 1972. He opened a total of 45 units, 13 of which were company owned and 32 of which were franchised, in Texas, Mississippi, Alabama, and Georgia.

In 1964, Hartzog opened the first Hart's Fried Chicken store in Mobile, AL. In 1972, he sold all of his KFC stores, bakeries, and his restaurant equipment company to the KFC parent company. Due to competition between Hart's stores and KFC franchise stores in Mobile, Wayne Johnson, Hartzog's brother-in-law and the Vice President of restaurant operations for his company, bought the Mobile operation from the KFC parent company. Since then, Harts has been run by three generations of the Johnson family and is one of the oldest family-owned restaurants in Mobile, Alabama, with five locations in the area.

He sold the lot in 1986 to a newly formed AJP Enterprises subsidiary, Hartz Chicken Inc.

The chain began international expansion with a store in Malaysia under the name Hartz Chicken Buffet. In the late 1990s the brand opened locations in Jakarta, Indonesia and Shanghai, China, both of which later closed.

Between 1986 and July 1994, the chain was managed by George N. Samaras (CEO/Director) under Hartz Chicken International Co. which voluntarily dissolved on July 13, 1994. After transferring the chain to Hartz Restaurant International Inc., Hartz Restaurants International Inc. and Gemini Investors Inc. formed Wingstop Holdings, Inc. in 2003 and acquired Wingstop from its founder, Antonio Swad. Wingstop was sold to Roark Capital Group in 2010. The chain once opened as far as Indonesia in early 2000s but it was folded sometime before 2009.

In 2018 Hartz Franchise Restaurants, Ltd named AVVA Agency its creative agency of record. The agency begun to catalog existing assets, develop online presence and creative campaigns for the brand. AVVA Agency's first assignment involved the creation and execution of new in-store, online and print advertising to promote a slate of new menu and products.
