= Jacques Herzog =

Swiss architect (born 1950)

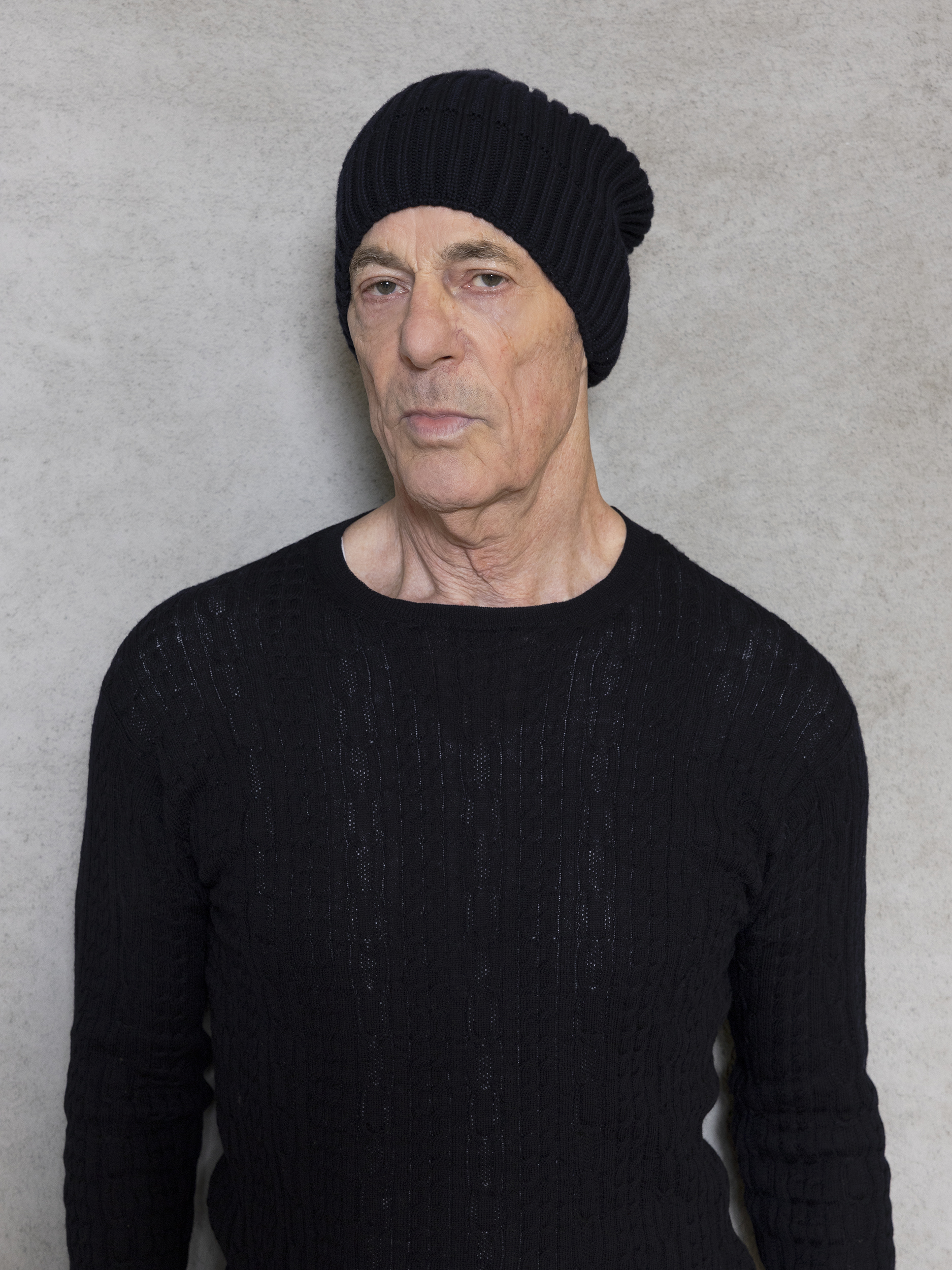
- Born: 19 April 1950 (age 76); Basel, Switzerland
- Citizenship: Swiss
- Education: ETH Zurich; EPFL
- Occupation: Architect
- Years active: 1977–present
- Awards: Pritzker Architecture Prize; Royal Gold Medal
- Practice: Herzog & de Meuron
- Buildings: Tate Modern; Elbphilharmonie; National Library of Israel; Tour Triangle; Beijing National Stadium
- Website: www.herzogdemeuron.com

Jacques Herzog (born 19 April 1950) is a Swiss architect and a founding partner along with Pierre de Meuron of the architectural firm Herzog & de Meuron. Herzog, along with de Meuron, has received the Pritzker Architecture Prize and the Royal Gold Medal, among numerous other awards.

Some of the most well-known projects by Herzog & de Meuron include the conversion of the Bankside Power Station into the Tate Modern in London, the Elbphilharmonie concert hall in Hamburg, the National Library of Israel in Jerusalem, the Tour Triangle in Paris, and the Beijing National Stadium, also known as the "Bird's Nest", designed for the 2008 Olympics.

== Early life and education ==
Jacques Herzog was born in Basel, Switzerland. Growing up in Basel, Herzog developed an early interest in the arts and architecture, influenced by the cultural history of his hometown. He was in the same primary school class as Pierre de Meuron, who would later become his long-term collaborator and business partner. He pursued his passion by enrolling for a degree in architecture at École Polytechnique Fédérale de Lausanne (EPFL), before continuing his studies at the Swiss Federal Institute of Technology Zurich (ETH Zurich).

After receiving his degree in 1975, Herzog stayed at ETH Zurich working as ateaching assistant to Professor Dolf Schnebli. In 1978, Herzog and de Meuron established their practice Herzog & de Meuron in Basel.

== Career ==
Herzog & de Meuron gained international recognition for their ability to join refinement with pragmatism and urbanism. Their projects have been noted to respond to both the collective realm of the city and the needs of their clients. Among their early projects are the Ricola Storage Building in Laufen, Switzerland (1987), which showcased their approach to materiality and texture, and the Dominus Winery in Napa Valley, California, US (1998), where they employed local stone-filled gabions as a primary building material.

Their work on the conversion of the Bankside Power Station into the Tate Modern in London (2000) gained them an international reputation as architects. Further important commissions include the Allianz Arena in Munich (2005) and the Beijing National Stadium, also known as the "Bird's Nest", for the 2008 Olympics.

Herzog & de Meuron's projects are noted for their diversity in both form and function, from cultural institutions and sports facilities to residential buildings and urban master plans. Their ability to adapt their design approach to the context of each project while maintaining a high level of architectural integrity has earned them numerous awards, including the prestigious Pritzker Architecture Prize in 2001.

== Collaboration with artists ==
Herzog has maintained a longstanding and profound collaboration with artists throughout his career, which has significantly influenced his architectural approach.

In the 1970s, Herzog exhibited his own artwork in various galleries and art spaces in formats such as video, works on paper, and installation pieces using different materials such as tar, asphalt boards, plywood and styrofoam.

Two significant early influences on Herzog were artist Joseph Beuys and architect Aldo Rossi, the latter being his professor during his studies at ETH Zurich. His proximity to the art scene and friendships with artists have impacted his architectural philosophy, favouring a concept-based approach over a stylistic one. Herzog, along with Pierre de Meuron, initiated Joseph Beuys's involvement in the Basel Carnival (Fasnacht) through the creation of felt suit costumes and the reproduction of other elements of Beuys's iconic installation "Feuerstätte". The physical remnants of that 1978 carnival event have then been piled up, reassembled and transformed – based on a sketch by Beuys – into “Feuerstätte II”, a large installation piece which is since then part of the permanent collection of the Kunstmuseum Basel. This project exemplifies the kind of artistic engagement that influenced his architectural works.

== Academia ==
Herzog has been actively involved in academia, contributing to architectural education internationally.

After graduating from ETH Zurich in 1975, he served as an assistant to Professor Dolf Schnebli at ETH Zurich in 1977. In 1983, he held a visiting professorship at Cornell University in Ithaca, New York. Herzog began teaching as a visiting professor at Harvard University in 1989.

From 1999 to 2018, de Meuron and Jacques Herzog served as full professors at ETH Zurich, where they significantly contributed to architectural research and pedagogy. There they founded the ETH Studio Basel – Contemporary City Institute with Swiss architects Roger Diener and Marcel Meili and social geographer Christian Schmid. It was a research institute affiliated with the Swiss Federal Institute of Technology in Zurich (ETH Zurich), located in Basel, Switzerland. It was operational from 1999 to 2018. The institute conducted interdisciplinary research, combining architecture, urban planning, and sociology to analyse urban developments and proposed innovative solutions. Notable projects include the publication The Inevitable Specificity of Cities which tightly connects territorial research to their theoretical position about the specific evolution and transformation of cities; and an in depth study and analysis of the built and unbuilt landscapes in Switzerland (Die Schweiz – ein städtebauliches Portrait) which eventually became an important basis for the federal “Raumplanung” in their home country Switzerland.

== Approach and focus ==
Since the company's founding, Jacques Herzog has worked collaboratively with co-founder Pierre de Meuron: "Pierre de Meuron and I have always loved trying things out, being experimental – ever since we were in grade school together. It’s the way we are. We’re curious by nature." Each has brought their specific strengths to the partnership as ‘a source of some difference to start with in terms of centres of interest, character, and so on.’ Herzog and de Meuron have extended this mode of collaboration to a larger group of partners that have successively joined the practice over the years.

Jacques Herzog is heavily involved in the competitions, conceptual design, and the development of all projects by Herzog & de Meuron – architecture, urbanism and design. Drawing on his practical and academic experience, he shapes the work of the company out of an analytical perspective that considers the environmental, cultural, historical and social context of each project in its specificity – while also giving great importance to how people will one day use and inhabit these spaces.

Herzog also collaborated with de Meuron – and occasionally with artists such as Rémy Zaugg or Ai Weiwei – on urbanistic and territorial projects. This started already in their early years with an in depth analysis of the metropolitan area of Basel, which ultimately led to the foundation of the “ETH Studio Basel” (1999) together with Roger Diener and Marcel Meili. The focus was the analysis of landscapes and urban territories across the world; the theoretical output was summarized in their publication “The Inevitable Specificity of Cities”.

Herzog considers architecture to be political. He is a proponent for radical thinking in architecture, as well as the need for radical change to address ‘issues of energy, food, mobility, in other words, issues critical to the urbanization of our planet.’ In his intellectual work, including numerous texts, interviews and international academic lectures, Jacques Herzog articulates his approach to an architecture that is recognisable not through its stylistic uniformity but through its diversity and contextualisation.

For Herzog, thinking about the representation of a building is identical to thinking about architecture itself, therefore exhibitions are opportunities to find new ways of presenting the work to the viewer. Additionally, the physical creation of objects and prototypes is integral to his work, evidenced by hands-on crafting of ceramic tiles for a project in Basel, amongst numerous other objects and designs for furniture.

Herzog uses the act of sketching and writing to find and define the conceptual level of a project. In reference to an exhibition catalogue of Herzog's sketches at the Peter Blum Gallery, Blum stated ‘this book intends to show the artist conceiving […]; the drawings selected for this volume reveal something about the vision of Herzog & de Meuron and their attitude of how they see the world.’ Per curator Theodora Vischer, the sketches ‘capture given situations and transform them seismographically into unexpected places.’

== Notable projects ==
- The Blue House is located in a suburban area in Oberwil, Switzerland. Completed in 1980, the Blue House both aligns with and distinguishes itself from neighboring suburban houses through its design, featuring a curved northern concrete block wall and a thin layer of ultramarine paint that creates an impression of fragility.
- The Dominus Winery in Napa Valley, California, known for its seamless integration with the landscape using gabion walls filled with local basalt rocks. Completed in 1997, the winery is celebrated for its minimalist design that blends harmoniously with the surrounding vineyard, reflecting a deep connection between architecture and nature.
- The Ricola Projects, including the Ricola Storage Building in Laufen (1987) and the Ricola Europe's Headquarters in Mulhouse-Brunstatt (1993), exemplify Herzog & de Meuron's innovative use of materials and form. The Storage Building features translucent polycarbonate panels that allow diffused light, while the Headquarters building integrates with the rural landscape using a distinctive curved roof and timber cladding.
- Prada Aoyama Tokyo, a flagship store in Tokyo's Aoyama district, completed in 2003. The building is renowned for its diamond-shaped glass façade with convex and concave panes, creating a dynamic and transparent structure that reflects the fashion brand's innovative spirit. The design merges retail space with architectural artistry, making it a landmark in contemporary commercial architecture.
- Tate Modern in London, which transformed a disused power station into a modern art gallery. Opened in 2000, the Tate Modern has become one of the most visited art museums in the world, celebrated for its innovative design that seamlessly blends industrial elements with contemporary art spaces.
- The Beijing National Stadium, also known as the "Bird's Nest", built for the 2008 Summer Olympics in Beijing. Its iconic structure is renowned for its unique steel lattice design, which has become a symbol of the 2008 Games and a landmark in Beijing. The stadium was designed as a versatile venue and host both athletic events and cultural performances.
- The Elbphilharmonie in Hamburg, a concert hall that has become a landmark of the city. Completed in 2016, the Elbphilharmonie features a striking glass structure atop a historic warehouse building, offering stunning views of the Hamburg harbour. It features world-class acoustics and has developed into a cultural hub for music and the arts.
- The Allianz Arena in Munich, which is known for its façade that can change colours. Completed in 2005, the stadium is home to FC Bayern Munich and is renowned for its innovative design and the use of inflated ETFE plastic panels that can be lit up in different colours, creating a dynamic visual experience.
- 1111 Lincoln Road in Miami Beach, Florida, a mixed-use development known for its innovative parking structure. Completed in 2010, this project is lauded for reimagining the parking garage as a dynamic urban space, featuring retail, dining, and event spaces that engage with the surrounding community.
- The Nouveau Stade de Bordeaux was built between 2012 and 2015 ahead of the UEFA Euro 2016 hosted by France.
- The M+ museum is a flagship cultural institution in Hong Kong's West Kowloon Cultural District. Completed in 2021, the building is known for its inverted T-shaped form, combining vast gallery spaces with offices and research areas. It also houses Uli Sigg's collection of Chinese art.
- The new Kinderspital Zürich, a children's hospital opened in 2024. The project emphasizes a healing environment, integrating natural light and green spaces to support the recovery process for young patients. By balancing advanced medical functionality with a nurturing atmosphere, the building represents a new model for pediatric healthcare facilities.
- Completed in 2002, the REHAB Basel is a specialized rehabilitation centre. The facility focuses on neurological and orthopedic rehabilitation, with an architectural design that prioritizes patient comfort and interaction with nature.
- The Tour Triangle in Paris, currently under construction, is controversially redefining the city's skyline at Porte de Versailles. Construction started in 2008, but the Council of Paris voted against the plans in 2014, before approving them in 2015.
- The new National Library of Israel in Jerusalem was commissioned in 2013 and opened in 2023.

== Jacques Herzog und Pierre de Meuron Kabinett ==
The Kabinett is a charitable foundation established in Basel in 2015. It preserves and manages the extensive archives of the architects' works, including architectural drawings, sketches, models, and personal collections. The Kabinett is divided into three areas: architecture, art, and photography, encompassing a wide range of materials and collections, such as the extensive Ruth and Peter Herzog collection of historic photography dating back to the early 19th century. Although the Kabinett is not open to the general public, it provides access to researchers and specialists by appointment.

== Object design ==
Herzog & de Meuron have a portfolio of object design, complementing their architectural practice. Since the firm's inception in 1978, they have designed over 600 objects, including furniture, lighting, jewellery, and cutlery. These objects often serve as elements within their architectural projects but also stand alone as independent design pieces.

Notable among their object designs is the "Unterlinden" lamp, developed in collaboration with Italian lighting company Artemide. The lamp features a compact aluminum head reminiscent of industrial aesthetics, integrating advanced LED technology to provide efficient lighting. Other iconic objects are the Porta Volta Arm chair, the X-Hocker, the Corker, and the Nose to Tail Rocking Chair.

In addition to the objects mentioned above, the firm has designed over 600 objects for their architectural projects, such as custom door handles, lighting fixtures, and seating, emphasising the seamless integration of design elements within their buildings.

== Awards and honors ==
Jacques Herzog, along with Pierre de Meuron, has received numerous awards for his contributions to architecture, including:

- The Pritzker Architecture Prize in 2001, which is often referred to as the Nobel Prize of architecture.
- The Royal Gold Medal awarded by the Royal Institute of British Architects in 2007.
- The Praemium Imperiale awarded by the Japan Art Association in 2007, recognizing lifetime achievement in the arts.
- The Mies Crown Hall Americas Prize in 2014, awarded for the most distinguished architectural works built in North and South America.

They have received multiple Honorary Doctorates from:

- University of Basel (2000)
- Royal College of Art (2016)
- Technical University of Munich (2018)
