= Herzog & de Meuron =

Swiss architecture firm founded in 1978

Herzog & de Meuron Basel Ltd.

Practice information
- Partners: Jacques Herzog; Pierre de Meuron; Wim Walschap (CEO); Christine Binswanger; Ascan Mergenthaler; Stefan Marbach; Jason Frantzen; Andreas Fries; Robert Hösl; Simon Demeuse; Olga Bolshanina; Santiago Espitia Berndt; Martin Knüsel; Steffen Riegas; Christoph Röttinger; Tobias Winkelmann; Helen Ng; Julian Oggier; Tristan Zelic
- Founders: Jacques Herzog; Pierre de Meuron
- Founded: 1978
- Location: Basel, Switzerland; Berlin, Germany; Munich, Germany; New York City, USA; San Francisco, USA; London, UK; Hong Kong, China

Significant works and honors
- Projects: Tate Modern; Allianz Arena; Beijing National Stadium; M+ Museum; Elbphilharmonie
- Awards: Pritzker Prize (2001); Prix de l'Équerre d'Argent (2001); Royal Gold Medal (2007); Schock Prize (1999); Stirling Prize (2003)

Website
- www.herzogdemeuron.com

Herzog & de Meuron Basel Ltd. is an international architecture firm headquartered in Basel, Switzerland, with additional offices in Berlin, Hong Kong, London, Munich, New York City, Paris, and San Francisco. Founded in 1978 by Jacques Herzog and Pierre de Meuron, the practice's portfolio includes more than 600 projects in 40 countries. The company is led by the founding partners along with senior partners Christine Binswanger, Ascan Mergenthaler, Stefan Marbach, Jason Frantzen, Andreas Fries, Wim Walschap, and the CEO, Adrian Keller, who collectively oversee the firm's direction and management. Its staff comprises over 500 employees representing more than 50 nationalities.

== History and international recognition ==
Herzog & de Meuron Basel Ltd. was founded in 1978 in Basel, Switzerland, by Jacques Herzog and Pierre de Meuron, graduates of the Swiss Federal Institute of Technology (ETH Zurich) in 1977. The firm initially gained recognition for minimalist designs and innovative use of materials, such as the Blue House in Oberwil (1980) and the Ricola Storage Building in Laufen (1987). Their international reputation grew in the 1990s with projects like the Goetz Collection in Munich (1992), which featured glass cladding to diffuse natural light, and the Dominus Winery in Napa Valley (1997), notable for its gabion walls of local stones that integrate the structure with its surroundings.

The transformation of London's Bankside Power Station into the Tate Modern (2000) marked a turning point, blending industrial history with contemporary design. The New York Times praised it as "an example of how architecture can breathe new life into old structures." In 2001, Herzog & de Meuron received the prestigious Pritzker Architecture Prize, commended for their refined and innovative designs.

High-profile projects in the 2000s included the Beijing National Stadium (2008), known as the "Bird's Nest," created in collaboration with artist Ai Weiwei for the Summer Olympics. Other notable works included the REHAB Basel Clinic (2002), emphasizing light and openness for therapeutic recovery, and the Allianz Arena in Munich (2005), known for its dynamic ETFE façade. The Prada Aoyama store in Tokyo (2003) showcased experimental glass architecture.

In the 2010s, Herzog & de Meuron continued delivering landmark projects like the Vitra-Haus in Weil am Rhein (2010) and the Elbphilharmonie in Hamburg (2017), blending a wave-like glass structure with a historic brick warehouse. In New York, 56 Leonard Street (2017) featured a "Jenga-like" design, while the Powerhouse Arts building in Brooklyn (2023) highlighted their expertise in adaptive reuse.

In the 2020s, Herzog & de Meuron's work reflected a continued focus on innovation, sustainability, and cultural context. The M+ Museum in Hong Kong (2021) integrated LED lighting within a minimalist façade, and the Roche pRED Innovation Center in Basel (2023) showcased modular, sustainable design principles for interdisciplinary collaboration. Their healthcare projects include the Kinderspital in Zurich (2024), prioritizing natural materials, light, and healing environments, and ongoing facilities such as Hillerød Hospital in Denmark and UCSF Health Helen Diller Hospital in San Francisco.

Herzog & de Meuron have been recognized globally, receiving the Royal Gold Medal from the Royal Institute of British Architects (RIBA) in 2015 for their "profound contributions to architecture." Critic Jonathan Glancey summarized their impact: "Their work combines the physical and poetic, the robust and refined."

== Firm structure and governance ==
Jacques Herzog and Pierre de Meuron established Herzog & de Meuron in Basel in 1978. Over the decades, the firm has expanded through the inclusion of new partners and leadership roles. The first partner, Harry Gugger, joined in 1991 (he left the practice in 2009), followed by Christine Binswanger in 1994. Additional partners have since joined the practice: Robert Hösl and Ascan Mergenthaler in 2004, Stefan Marbach in 2006, Andreas Fries in 2011, Jason Frantzen and Wim Walschap in 2014, Simon Demeuse in 2019, Santiago Espitia Berndt in 2020, and Martin Knüsel in 2021.

The firm has also introduced Associate Partners, with Christoph Röttinger, Olga Bolshanina, and Steffen Riegas taking on the role in 2020, followed by Tobias Winkelmann in 2021.

In 2017, Adrian Keller joined Herzog & de Meuron as CEO, contributing to the firm's continued organizational and operational development.

== Academia ==
Herzog & de Meuron have been actively involved in academia, contributing to architectural education internationally. Jacques Herzog and Pierre de Meuron served as professors at the Swiss Federal Institute of Technology (ETH Zurich) from 1999 to 2018, where they co-founded the now discontinued ETH Studio Basel: Contemporary City Institute, focusing on urban studies and research. They have also held teaching roles as visiting professors at the Harvard University Graduate School of Design, with Jacques Herzog having served as a visiting tutor at the Cornell University College of Architecture, Art, and Planning. Although they are no longer teaching full-time, they continue to give lectures at various institutions.

The firm has produced several publications that contribute to architectural discourse. "Herzog & de Meuron: Natural History" (2002), edited by Philip Ursprung, explores the interplay between architecture and art through essays and detailed project analyses. "Herzog & de Meuron 1978–2007" (2008) is a comprehensive monograph that documents the firm's projects over nearly three decades, providing insights into their design processes and philosophies. Another notable work is "The Complete Works" series, which offers in-depth examinations of their projects, emphasizing conceptual approaches and material innovations.

Partners and associates of Herzog & de Meuron actively engage in architectural education and discourse through participation in studio reviews and lectures at various academic institutions. For example, senior partner Ascan Mergenthaler has been involved in studio critiques and has lectured at the Royal College of Art in London, sharing insights on contemporary architectural practice. Senior partner Christine Binswanger has given talks at the Massachusetts Institute of Technology (MIT), discussing the firm's approach to integrating environmental and social considerations in design. These activities allow the firm's contributition to the education of emerging architects and to engage with current academic dialogues in architecture.

Herzog & de Meuron have contributed to architectural discourse through several publications. The Inevitable Specificity of Cities (2015), co-authored among others by Jacques Herzog and Pierre de Meuron, presents urban research conducted at ETH Studio Basel. The book explores the unique characteristics of cities worldwide, emphasizing the importance of local specificity in urban planning and development. In MetroBasel. Ein Modell einer europäischen Metropolitan-Region (2009), Jacques Herzog, Pierre de Meuron, and Manuel Herz examine the Basel metropolitan area as a prototype for European metropolitan regions, discussing strategies for sustainable urban development and cross-border collaboration.

== Collaboration with artists ==
Jacques Herzog has named the artist Joseph Beuys and the architect Aldo Rossi (Herzog and de Meuron's professor at ETH Zurich) as two early influences. In a 2015 interview, Herzog said that collaborations with artists had changed their approach to architecture, from a stylistic to a conceptual. Senior partner Christine Binswanger has said that involving artists enables a freer way of thinking, because artists in their own work are not bound by obligations to clients or by building regulations.

In 1978, Herzog and de Meuron invited Beuys Basel Fasnacht. Beuys designed felt-suit costumes and reproduced elements of his installation Feuerstätte. The objects used in the parade were sketched by Beuys and afterwards reassembled as the installation Feuerstätte II. This installation is on display in the permanent collection of the Kunstmuseum Basel.

The firm has worked with artists including Rémy Zaugg, Ai Weiwei, Michael Craig-Martin, Thomas Ruff and Andreas Gursky.

Herzog & de Meuron collaborated with Ai Weiwei on the Beijing National Stadium for the 2008 Summer Olympics and on the 2012 Serpentine Gallery Pavilion in London. In a 2012 conversation, Herzog described the collaboration as the mutual encouragement "to go deeper", and Ai Weiwei stated that "no ego or any kind of need to assert one’s identity because from the very beginning we said that we were working, the three of us together, on a new identity".

== Jacques Herzog und Pierre de Meuron Kabinett ==
The Kabinett is a charitable foundation established in Basel in 2015. It preserves and manages the extensive archives of the architects' works, including architectural drawings, sketches, models, and personal collections. The Kabinett is divided into three areas architecture, art, and photography, encompassing a wide range of materials and collections, such as the extensive Ruth and Peter Herzog collection of historic photography dating back to the early 19th century. Although the Kabinett is not open to the general public, it provides access to researchers and specialists by appointment.

== Awards ==
Among others Jacques Herzog and Pierre de Meuron have been awarded these prizes:

- Pritzker Architecture Prize awarded by the Hyatt Foundation in 2001
- Royal Gold Medal awarded by the Royal Institute of British Architects in 2007
- Praemium Imperiale awarded by the Japan Art Association in 2007, recognizing lifetime achievement in the arts
- Mies Crown Hall Americas Prize in 2014, awarded for architectural works built in North and South America

Jacques Herzog and Pierre de Meuron have received multiple Honorary Doctorates from:

- University of Basel (2000)
- Royal College of Art (2016)
- Technical University of Munich (2018)

== Selected projects ==
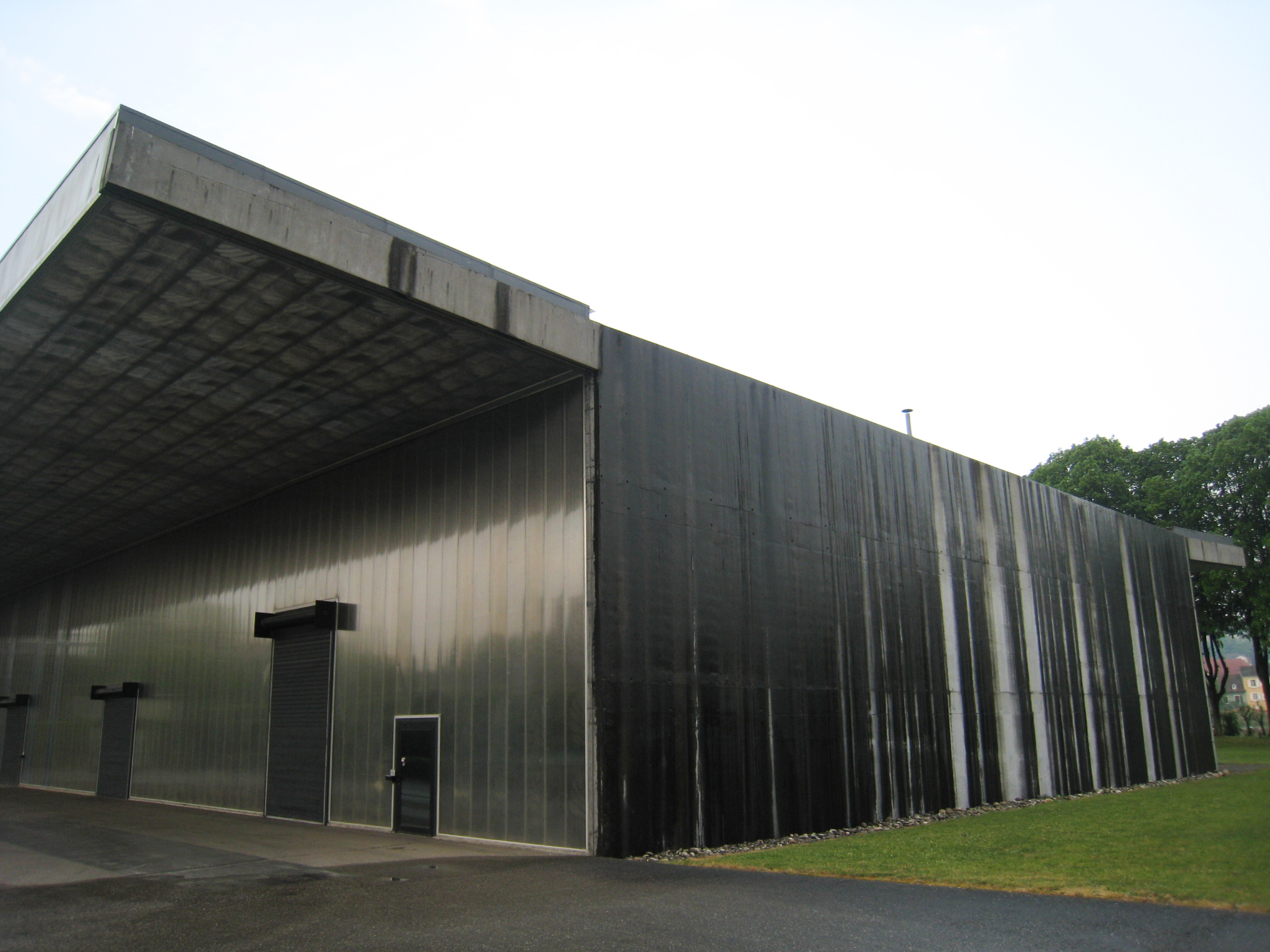
Ricola Production and Storage Building in Brunstatt, France

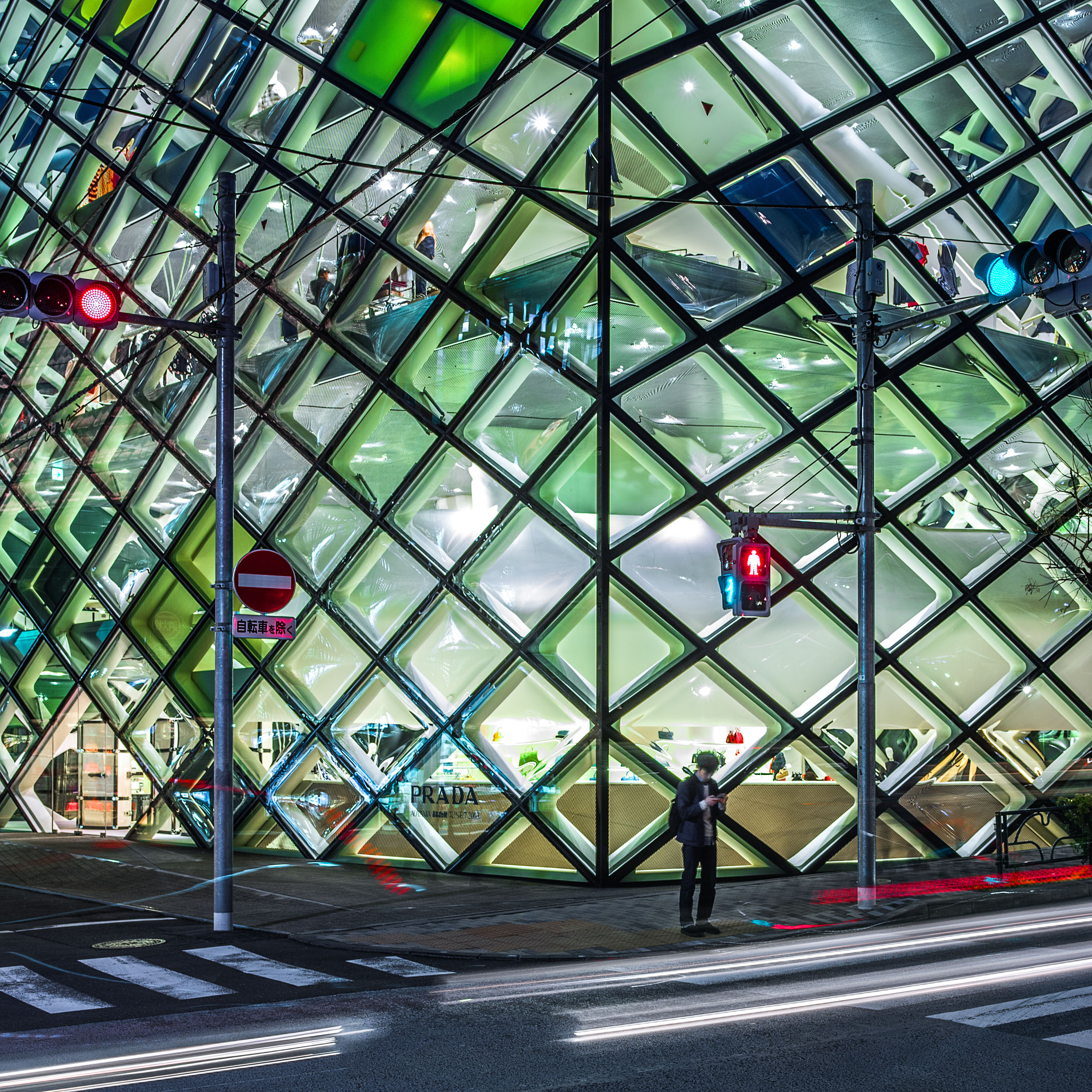
Prada Aoyama Store façade in Tokyo, Japan

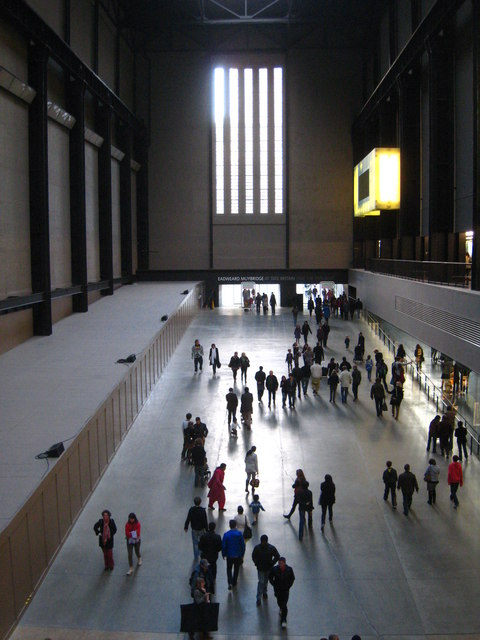
Turbine hall at Tate Modern, London, United Kingdom

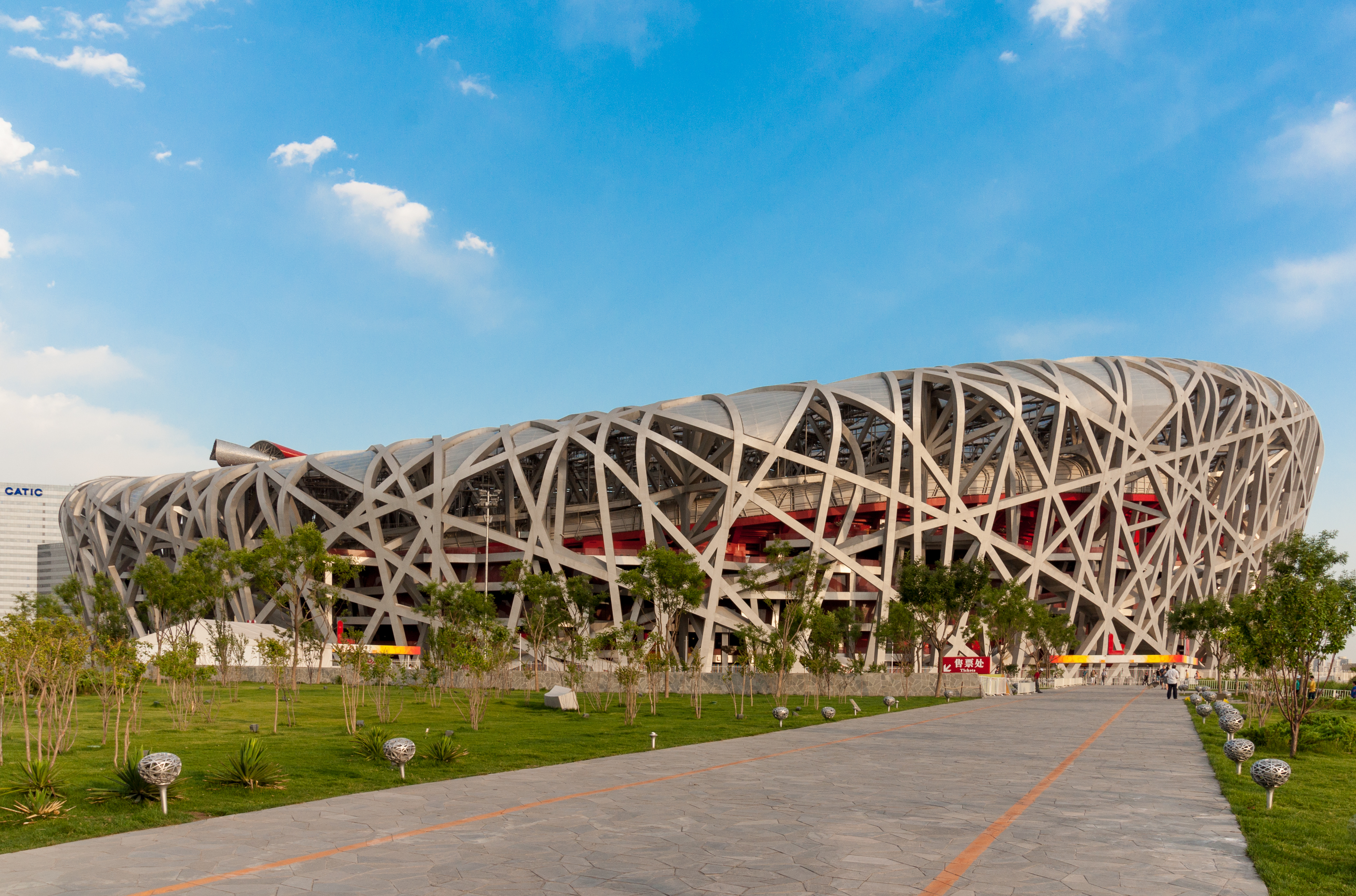
Beijing National Stadium, Beijing, China

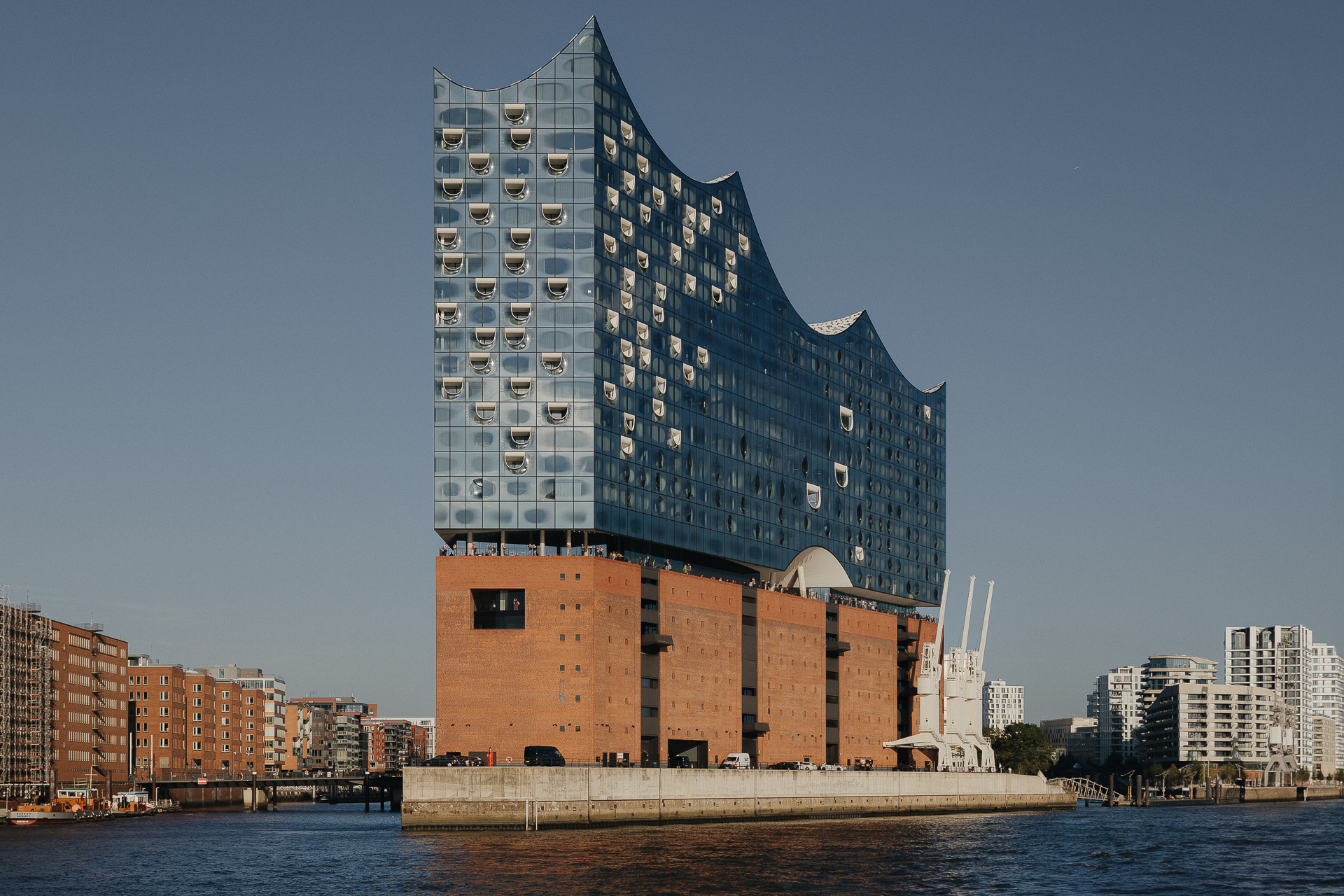
Elbphilharmonie, HafenCity in Hamburg, Germany

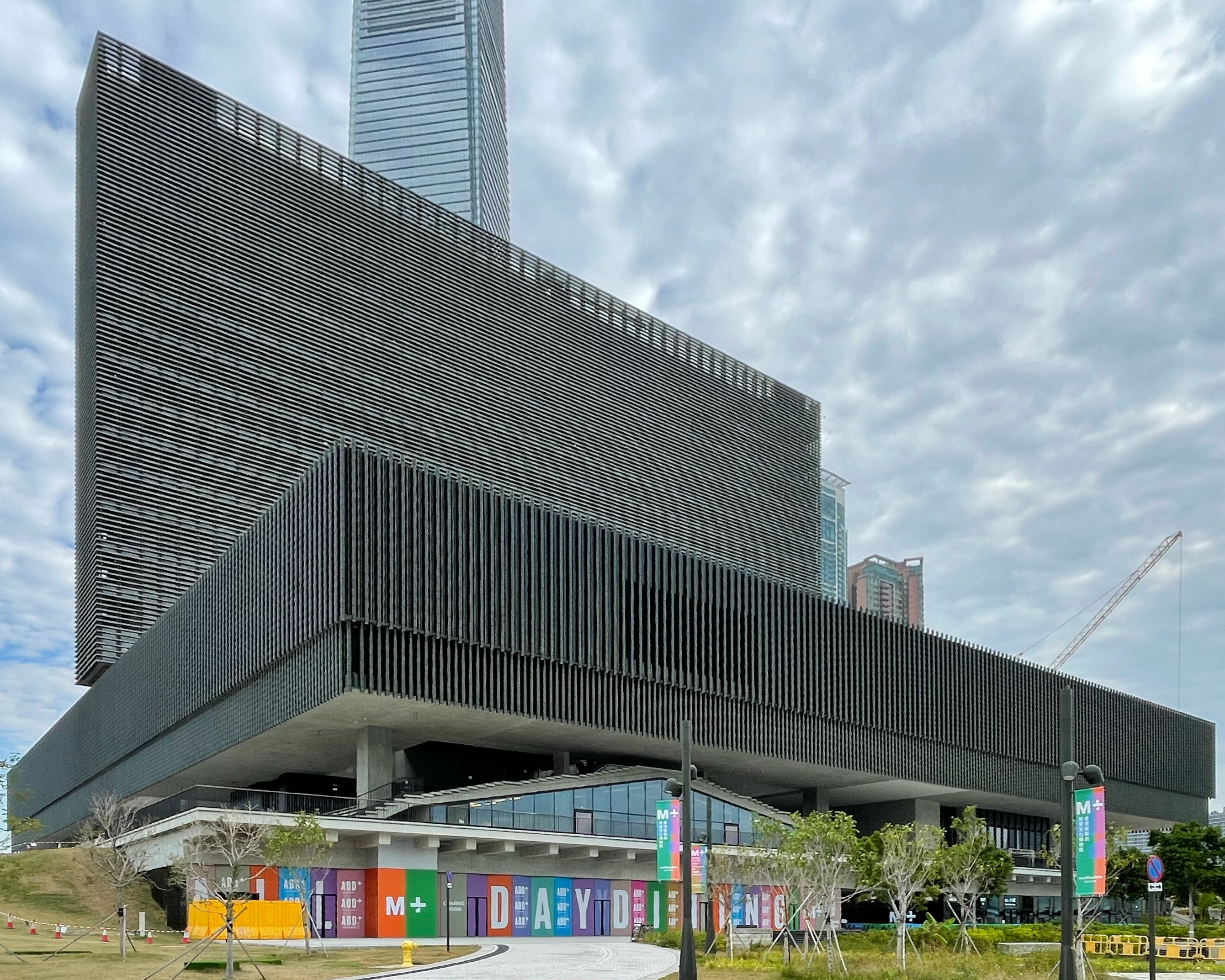
M+ Museum, Hong Kong, China

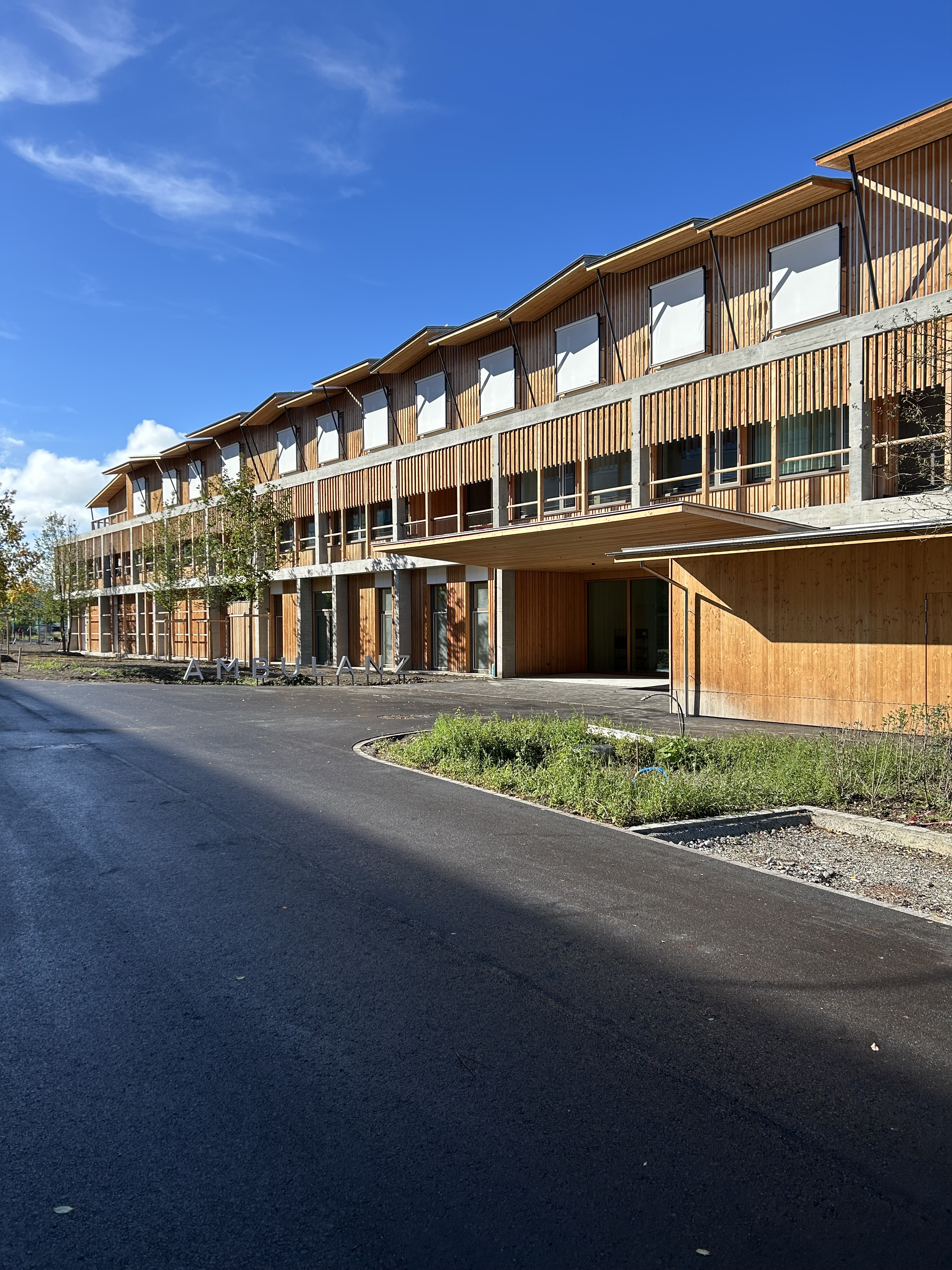
Kinderspital Zürich, Zurich, Switzerland

- Blue House is located in a suburban area in Oberwil, Switzerland, Completed in 1980, the Blue House both aligns with and distinguishes itself from neighboring suburban houses through its design, featuring a curved northern concrete block wall and a thin layer of ultramarine paint that creates an impression of fragility.
- Dominus Winery in Napa Valley, California, known for its seamless integration with the landscape using gabion walls filled with local basalt rocks. Completed in 1997, the winery is celebrated for its minimalist design that blends harmoniously with the surrounding vineyard, reflecting a deep connection between architecture and nature.
- The Ricola Projects, including the Ricola Storage Building in Laufen (1987) and the Ricola Europe's Headquarters in Mulhouse-Brunstatt (1993), exemplify Herzog & de Meuron's innovative use of materials and form. The Storage Building features translucent polycarbonate panels that allow diffused light, while the Headquarters building integrates with the rural landscape using a distinctive curved roof and timber cladding.
- Prada Aoyama Tokyo, a flagship store in Tokyo's Aoyama district, completed in 2003. The building is renowned for its diamond-shaped glass façade with convex and concave panes, creating a dynamic and transparent structure that reflects the fashion brand's innovative spirit. The design merges retail space with architectural artistry, making it a landmark in contemporary commercial architecture.
- Tate Modern in London, which transformed a disused power station into a modern art gallery. Opened in 2000, the Tate Modern has become one of the most visited art museums in the world, celebrated for its innovative design that seamlessly blends industrial elements with contemporary art spaces.
- Beijing National Stadium, also known as the "Bird's Nest," built for the 2008 Summer Olympics in Beijing. Its iconic structure is renowned for its unique steel lattice design, which has become a symbol of the 2008 Games and a landmark in Beijing. The stadium was designed as versatile venue and host both athletic events and cultural performances.
- Elbphilharmonie in Hamburg, a concert hall that has become a landmark of the city. Completed in 2016, the Elbphilharmonie features a striking glass structure atop a historic warehouse building, offering stunning views of the Hamburg harbor. It features world-class acoustics and has developed into a cultural hub for music and the arts.
- Completed in 2002, the REHAB Basel is a specialized rehabilitation center. The facility focuses on neurological and orthopedic rehabilitation, with an architectural design that prioritizes patient comfort and interaction with nature.
- Allianz Arena in Munich, that is known for its façade that can change colors. Completed in 2005, the stadium is home to FC Bayern Munich and is renowned for its innovative design and the use of inflated ETFE plastic panels that can be lit up in different colors, creating a dynamic visual experience.
- 1111 Lincoln Road in Miami Beach, a mixed-use development known for its innovative parking structure. Completed in 2010, this project is lauded for reimagining the parking garage as a dynamic urban space, featuring retail, dining, and event spaces that engage with the surrounding community.
- The M+ museum is a flagship cultural institution in Hong Kong's West Kowloon Cultural District. Completed in 2021, the building is known for its inverted T-shaped form, combining vast gallery spaces with offices and research areas. It houses also Uli Sigg's collection of Chinese art.
- The new Kinderspital Zürich, a children's hospital opened in 2024. The project emphasizes a healing environment, integrating natural light and green spaces to support the recovery process for young patients. By balancing advanced medical functionality with a nurturing atmosphere, the building represents a new model for pediatric healthcare facilities.

== Exhibitions ==
While Herzog & de Meuron often make contributions to exhibitions at various institutions around the world, they have curated a number of solo exhibitions, most recently Herzog & de Meuron at the Royal Academy of Arts in London in 2023.

A selection of relevant exhibitions on Herzog & de Meuron's oeuvre. A complete list of exhibition can be found on their website.

- 1 October – 20 November 1988: Architektur Denkform, Architekturmuseum Basel, Switzerland
- 8 March – 22 May 1995: Herzog & de Meuron, Une Exposition, conceived by Rémy Zaugg at Centre Pompidou, Paris, France
- 23 October 2002 – 6 April 2003: Herzog & de Meuron: Archaeology of the Mind, curated by Philip Ursprung, Canadian Centre for Architecture, Montréal, Canada
- 2004–2006 (multiple showings): An Exhibition by Schaulager Basel and Herzog & de Meuron at Münchenstein, Switzerland
- 14 July – 15 October 2023: Herzog & de Meuron at Royal Academy of Arts, London

== Selected publications ==
- Birkhäuser complete works series:
  - Gerhard Mack, Herzog & de Meuron: Herzog & de Meuron 1978–1988. The Complete Works. Volume 1. Birkhäuser, 1997.
  - Gerhard Mack, Herzog & de Meuron: Herzog & de Meuron 1992–1996. The Complete Works. Volume 3. Birkhäuser, 2000.
  - Gerhard Mack, Herzog & de Meuron: Herzog & de Meuron 1989–1991. The Complete Works. Volume 2. Birkhäuser, 2005.
  - Gerhard Mack, Herzog & de Meuron: Herzog & de Meuron 1997–2001. The Complete Works. Volume 4. Birkhäuser, 2008.
  - Gerhard Mack, Herzog & de Meuron: Herzog & de Meuron 2002–2004. The Complete Works. Volume 5. Birkhäuser, 2020.
  - Gerhard Mack, Herzog & de Meuron: Herzog & de Meuron 2005–2007. The Complete Works. Volume 6. Birkhäuser, 2018.
- Moos, Stanislaus von; Rüegg, Arthur (2024). Twentyfive x Herzog & de Meuron (1st ed.). Göttingen: Steidl. ISBN 978-3-96999-138-1.

An all encompassing list of monographs on and by Herzog & de Meuron as well as their writings are available on their official website.
