= Temple of Asclepius, Kos =

Coordinates: 36°52′33″N 27°15′26″E

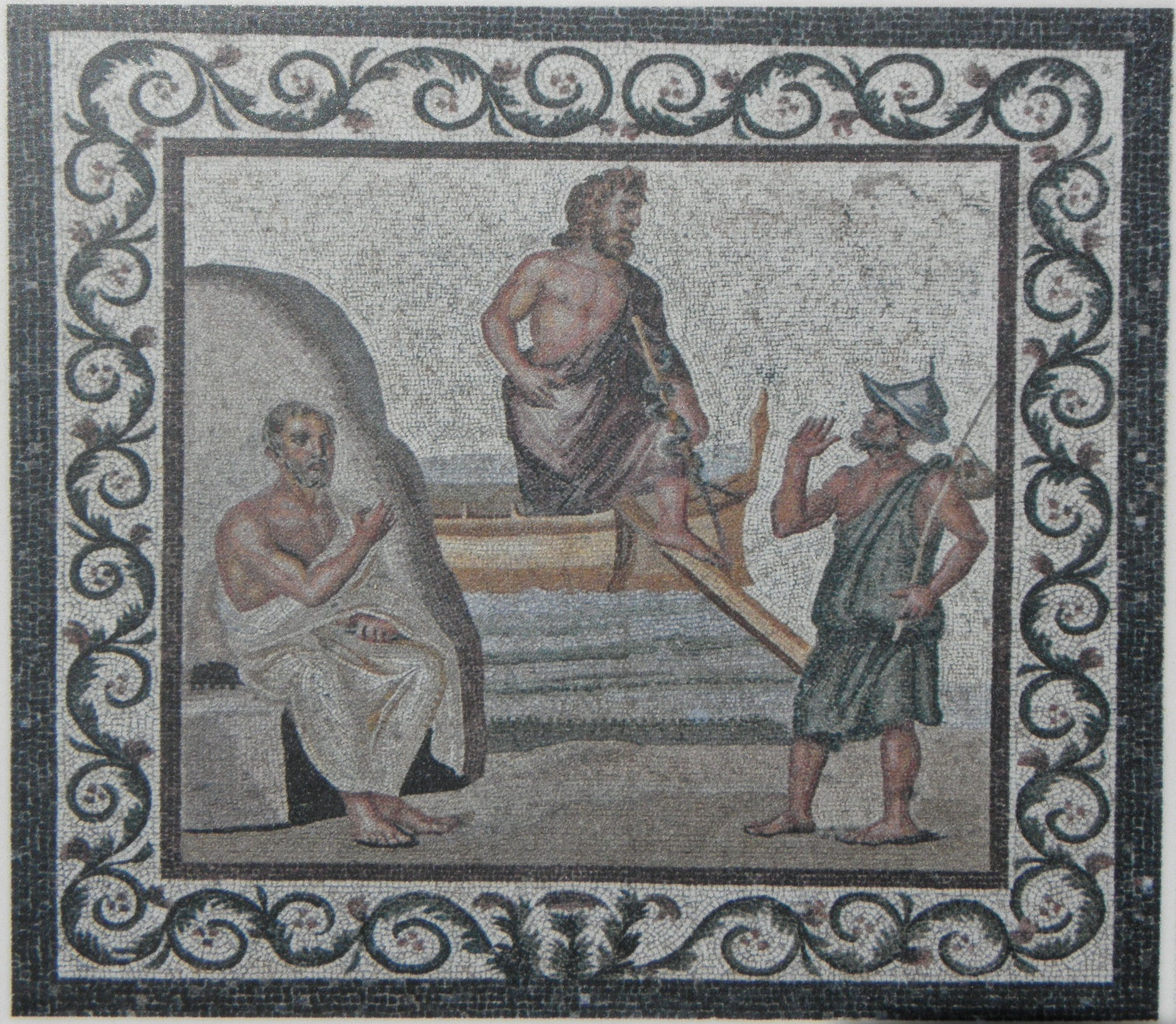
Mosaic Arrival of Asclepius, Archaeological Museum of Kos

The Temple of Asclepius or Asclepieion of Kos was one of the most famous temples dedicated to Asclepius in the ancient world. The archeologist Rudolf Herzog, grandfather of Werner Herzog, excavated it in 1902, as the latter recounted in conversation with Paul Holdengräber.
