= Simon Herzog =

German politician (born 1999)

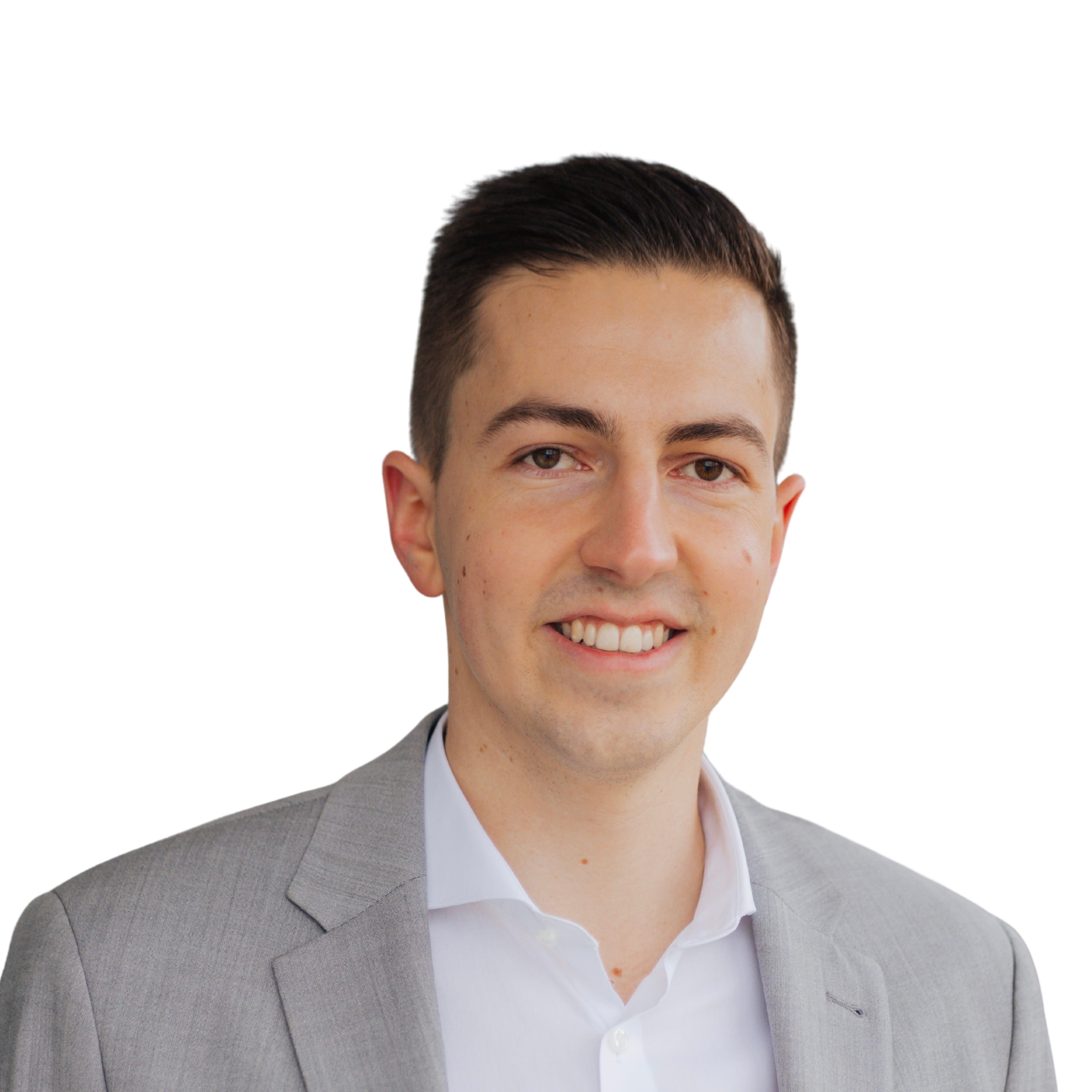
- Herzog in 2025

Member of the Landtag of Baden-Württemberg
- Incumbent
- Assumed office 11 May 2026
- Constituency: Waldshut

Personal details
- Born: 1999 (age 26–27)
- Party: Christian Democratic Union

Simon Herzog (born 1999) is a German politician who was elected member of the Landtag of Baden-Württemberg in 2026. He is the digital officer of the Christian Democratic Union in Waldshut.
