= Bernhard Herzog =

Austrian politician (born 1984)

Member of the National Council
- Incumbent
- Assumed office 24 October 2024
- Constituency: Vienna North

Personal details
- Born: 25 November 1984 (age 41)
- Party: Social Democratic Party

Bernhard Herzog (born 25 November 1984) is an Austrian politician of the Social Democratic Party serving as a member of the National Council since 2024. He has been a district councillor of Floridsdorf since 2009.
