= Rudolf Herzog (archeologist) =

German archaeologist (1871–1953)

Rudolf Ludwig Friedrich Herzog (1871–1953) was a German archaeologist, classical philologist, and historian of medicine.

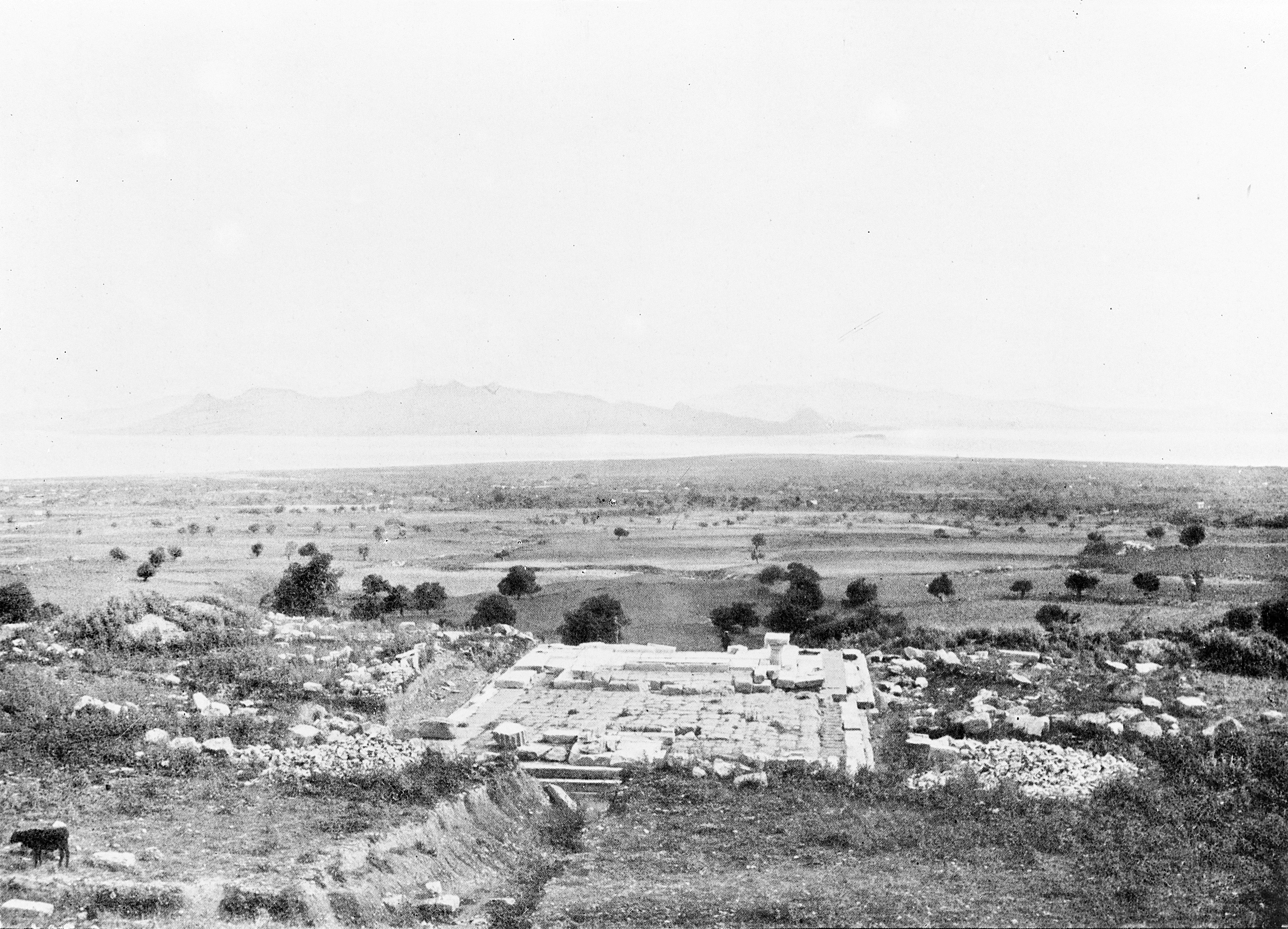
Ruins of the Asclepieion in 1912

He was professor of Ancient Greek at various German universities. On October 9 of 1902, he discovered the Asclepieion of Kos with help of the Greek historian Iacob Zarraftis, and started excavating it at the dawn of the twentieth century, from 1902 to 1904 or 1905. His son was the soldier Dietrich Herzog (1910–1989) and his grandson is the filmmaker Werner Herzog, who made a cinematic reference to Rudolf in his opera prima Lebenszeichen (Signs of Life).

== Life and career ==
He was born in Tübingen on August 31, 1871. Being son of professor Ernst Herzog (1834–1911), Rudolf Herzog attended the Gymnasium and protestant theological seminaries in Maulbronn and Blaubeuren.

After studying Classical Philology at the Universities of Bonn, Berlin, and Tübingen, he received his doctorate in 1894. As a student in Tübingen, in the winter semester of 1889 -1990 he joined the academic fraternity Igel zu Tübingen.

From 1895 to 1897, he worked as a secondary school teacher in Württemberg and in 1897-1898 received a travel grant from the German Archaeological Institute, which took him to ancient sites in the Mediterranean region, especially to the island of Kos.

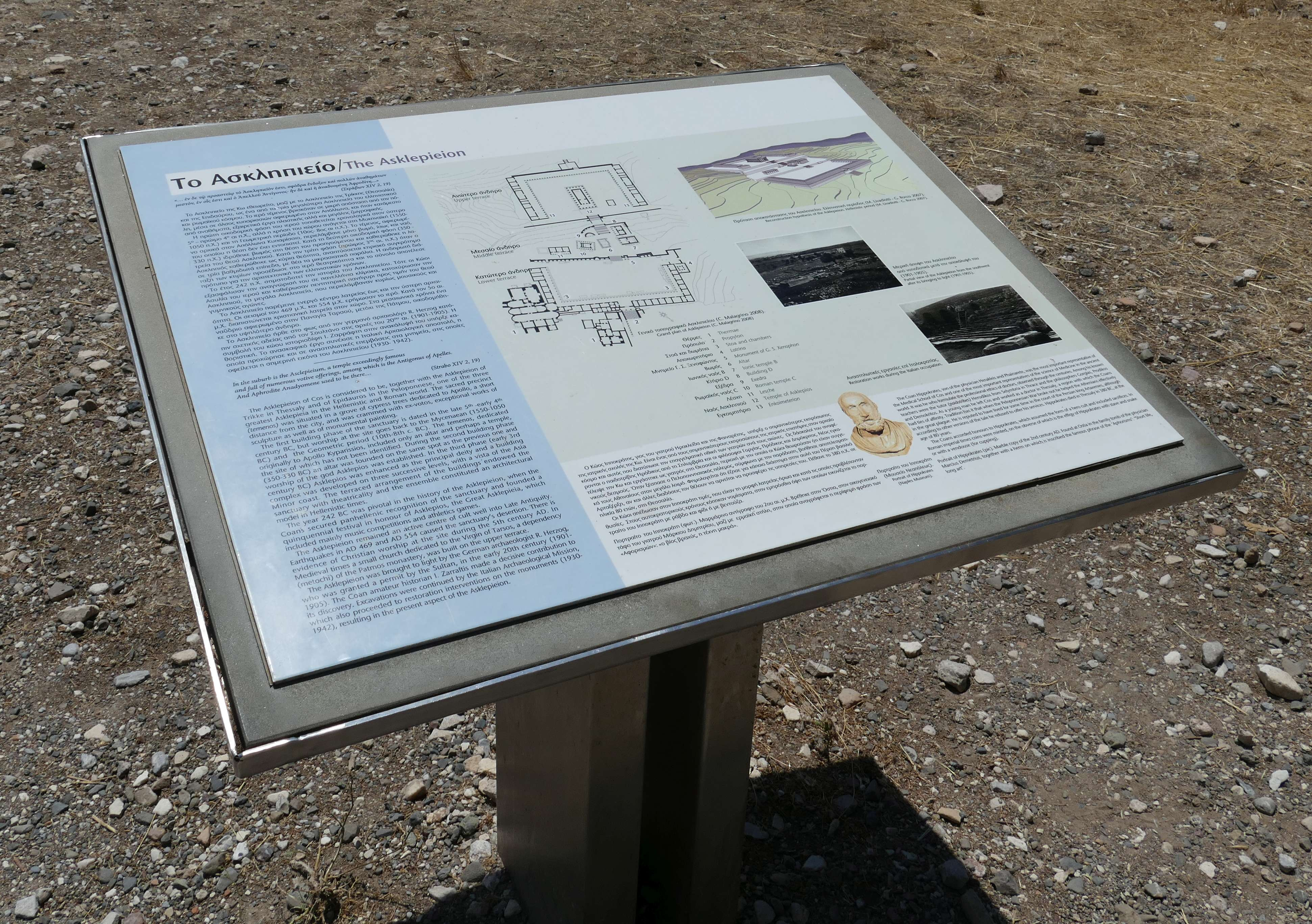
Information board of the Asklepieion mentioning R. Herzog

After completing his habilitation, Herzog became private lecturer in 1899 and associate professor in 1903. From 1900 to 1907, he conducted excavations of the Asklepieion on Kos, which he had discovered. From July 17, 1909, until the end of the winter semester of 1913-1914, he was a full professor and chair of Greek philology in Basel , succeeding Ferdinand Sommer. In 1914, he accepted a professorship at the University of Giessen as full professor of classical philology, succeeding Alfred Körte; his colleague there was Karl Kalbfleisch. In 1928, he was elected rector of the University of Giessen for one year and appointed chancellor in 1933. He retired in 1936.

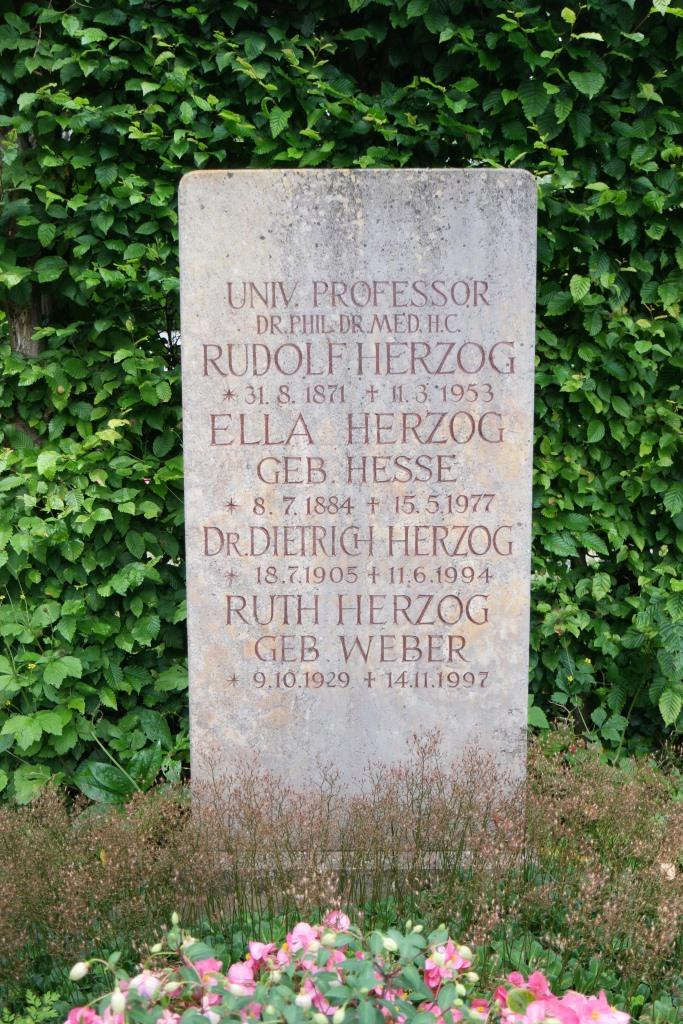
Rudolf Herzog's grave

On November 1, 1931 he had joined the Nazi Party, with membership number 692797. On July 5, 1934, with a vote he prevented Karl Reinhardt and Friedrich Pfister from being called to Gießen.

In 1933 he received an honorary doctorate from the Medical Faculty of the University of Rostock and became a full member of the Bavarian Academy of Sciences and Humanities in 1941. As a member of the German Grammar School Association , he was its last chairman until 1945.

He died on March 11, 1953, in Großhesselohe.

== Selected works ==
- Koische Forschungen und Funde. Dieterich, Leipzig 1899 (Reprint Olms, Hildesheim 1983, ISBN 3-487-07063-4).
- Aus der Geschichte des Bankwesens im Altertum: Tesserae nummulariae A. Töpelmann, Gießen 1919.
- Die Stellung der Philologie in der Universität A. Töpelmann, Gießen 1929 (Speech at the anniversary celebration of the Hessian Ludwig University on June 1, 1929).
- Die Wunderheilungen von Epidaurus. Ein Beitrag zur Geschichte der Medizin und der Religion (Philologus. Supplement Volume 22.3). Dieterich, Leipzig 1931.
- Asylieurkunden aus Kos (coauthored with Günther Klaffenbach). Akademie-Verlag, Berlin 1952 (Proceedings of the German Academy of Sciences in Berlin. Class for Languages, Literature and Art. Year 1952, No. 1).
