= Rémy Zaugg =

Swiss painter (1943–2005)

Rémy Zaugg (January 11, 1943 – August 23, 2005) was a Swiss painter, primarily known as a conceptual artist. He played an important role as both a critic and observer of contemporary culture, especially with regard to the perception of space and architecture.

== Life ==
Rémy Zaugg was born in 1943 in Courgenay, Jura, Switzerland. After attending high school in Porrentruy, he attended the Basel School of Art. In 1971 he received the "Eidgenössisches Kunststipendium" (now the Eidgenössische Preis für freie Kunst), a Swiss arts prize for young artists. Zaugg lived and worked in Basel, Switzerland, and Pfastatt, France.

Primarily using text and the meaning of the word as the subject of his paintings, Zaugg dealt with themes of perception, examining the various facets of vision. He believed sight and consciousness to be effectively linked, and that it was through their overlapping that our relationship with the world develops. He created paintings, works on paper, public sculpture, urban analysis and architectural designs. His theoretical discussions, in particular the book Das Kunstmuseum, das ich mir erträume. Oder Der Ort des Werkes und des Menschen (The Art Museum of My Dreams. Or the Place for Work and People) (1987), are important texts for art historians and artists. Throughout his life Zaugg questioned everything which the surrounding world took for granted, garnering talk of a "philosopher-artist." In 1990 he received the Kunstpreis der Stadt Basel (Art Prize of the City of Basel).

In recent years interesting collaborations with the architects Herzog & de Meuron, found international praise, with around 15 projects realised. These projects included an extension to the Aargauer Kunsthaus in Aarau, and Zaugg's own studio, "Studio Rémy Zaugg" in Mulhouse-Pfastatt, France, with the latter included at the awards ceremony of the Pritzker Prize, which Herzog & de Meuron received in 2001. The studio functioned both as Zaugg's workplace and exhibition hall. In designing a space suitable for exhibition, Herzog & de Meuron were given the opportunity to experiment with the concept of overhead lighting, the outcome of which went on to influence their design for the Tate Modern gallery in London.

In the last years of his life Zaugg was involved in the New Patrons program headed by Xavier Douroux. In collaboration with Douroux and the local inhabitants of Blessey, a small village near Dijon, he created Le Lavoir de Blessey an open-space artwork near and in the village's restored washhouse.

Zaugg was a renowned curator, organising shows such as the comprehensive Alberto Giacometti retrospective held in Paris 1991. In 1995, he made a contribution to the Swiss art and literary periodical TROU Nr. IX.

Zaugg died in 2005 in Basel.

== Exhibitions ==
- 1972 Dedans-Dehors, Kunstmuseum Basel
- 1977 Biennale de Paris
- 1982 Documenta 7, Kassel
- 1984 A Sheet of Paper, Stedelijk Van Abbemuseum, Eindhoven
- 1988 Für ein Bild, Kunsthalle Basel
- 1989 Ein Blatt Papier, perzeptive Skizzen, oder die Entstehung eines Bildwerks, Werke von 1973–1989, Museum Folkwang, Essen
- 1990 Une feuille de papier, Musée d'art contemporain de Lyon
- 1990 Biennale, Sydney
- 1991 Alberto Giacometti, Musée d'Art Moderne de la Ville de Paris
- 1992 Rémy Zaugg, Le Consortium Dijon
- 1993 Draußen, Gesellschaft für Aktuelle Kunst, Bremen
- 1994 Tableau Aveugles 1986–1991, Modulo, Lissabon
- 1995 Herzog & de Meuron, Centre Georges Pompidou, Paris
- 1996 Malerei 1973–1994, Barbara Gross Galerie, München
- 1997 Rémy Zaugg, RETROSPEKTIVE, Ein Fragment, Kunsthalle Nürnberg
- 1997 Public Works, Van Abbemuseum, Eindhoven
- 1998 Le Monde dit, Die Welt spricht, Gesamtkunstwerk im Eidgenössischen Verwaltungsgebäude, Bern
- 1999 Ich, ich, sehe., Barbara Gross Galerie, München
- 1999 Rémy Zaugg, Schau, du bist blind, schau, Kunsthalle Basel
- 1999 Das XX. Jahrhundert – ein Jahrhundert Kunst in Deutschland, National Galerie, Berlin
- 2000 Über den Tod, Kunsthalle, Bern
- 2000 Sinn und Sinnlichkeit – Körper + Geist im Bild, Neues Museum Weserburg Bremen
- 2001 Architecture by Herzog & de Meuron, wall painting by Rémy Zaugg, a work for Roche Basel
- 2001 Abbild. Recent Portraiture and Depiction, Steirischer Herbst, Graz
- 2001 Nauman, Felix Gonzalez Torres und Zaugg im Magasin 3, Stockholm
- 2002 About death II, Art Unlimited, Art 33, Basel
- 2002 Nouvelle simplicité – art „construit“ et architecture suisse contemporaine, Espace de l’Art Concret im Château de Mouans, Mouans-Sartoux
- 2002 French Collection – rien ne presse / slow and steady / festina lente / deuxième épisode, Musée d’art moderne et contemporain, Genf
- 2002 IMAGINE, YOU ARE STANDING HERE IN FRONT OF ME, Caldic Collection, Museum Boijmans Van Beuningen, Rotterdam
- 2002 Les années 70 : l’art en cause im CAPC Musée d’Art Contemporain, Entrepôt, Bordeaux
- 2003 Warum!, Martin Gropius-Bau, Berlin
- 2003 Talking Pieces – Text und Bild in der Zeitgenössischen Kunst, Städtisches Museum Leverkusen Schloß Morsbroich, Leverkusen
- 2003 On Kawara: Consciousness, meditation, watcher on the hill, 2002 – Rémy Zaugg: De la mort II,

1999–2002, Le Consortium, Dijon

- 2003 Rémy Zaugg Works 1963–2003, Galerie Mai 36, Zürich
- 2004 Barbara Gross Galerie, München
- 2004 A-Z, Brooke Alexander Gallery, New York
- 2004 White Spirit, Frac Lorraine, Metz
- 2005 Kevin Brown: A man and his mayonnaise, Brooke Alexander Gallery, New York
- 2015 Rémy Zaugg, Le Consortium, Dijon
