= W. Lawrence Hartzog Sr. =

American emtrepreneur

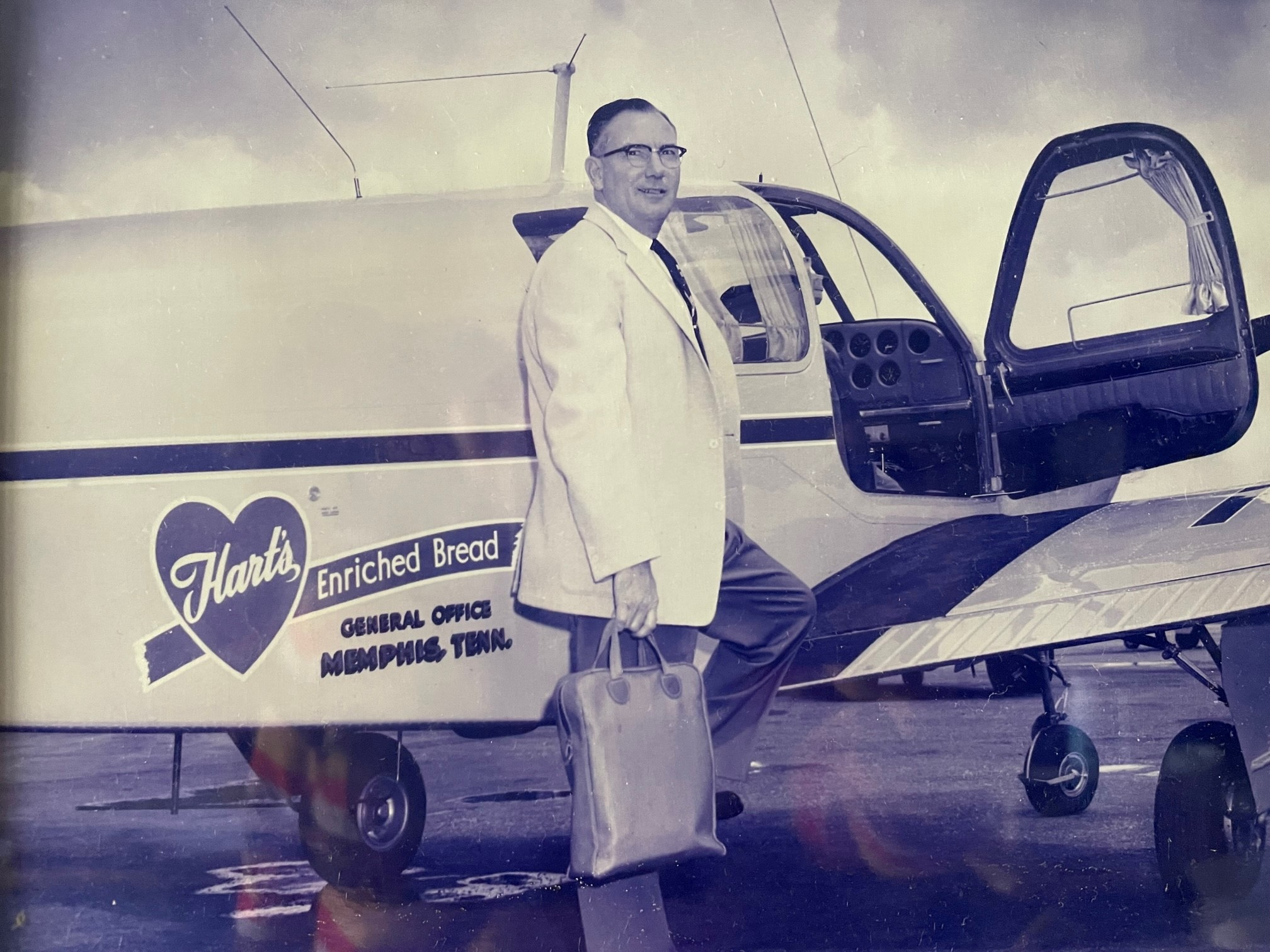
W. Lawrence Hartzog standing in front of his private plane with Harts Bakery logo on it

W. Lawrence Hartzog Sr. (February 1, 1930 – August 29, 2004) was an American entrepreneur, best known for his contributions to the fast food industry.

== Early life and career ==
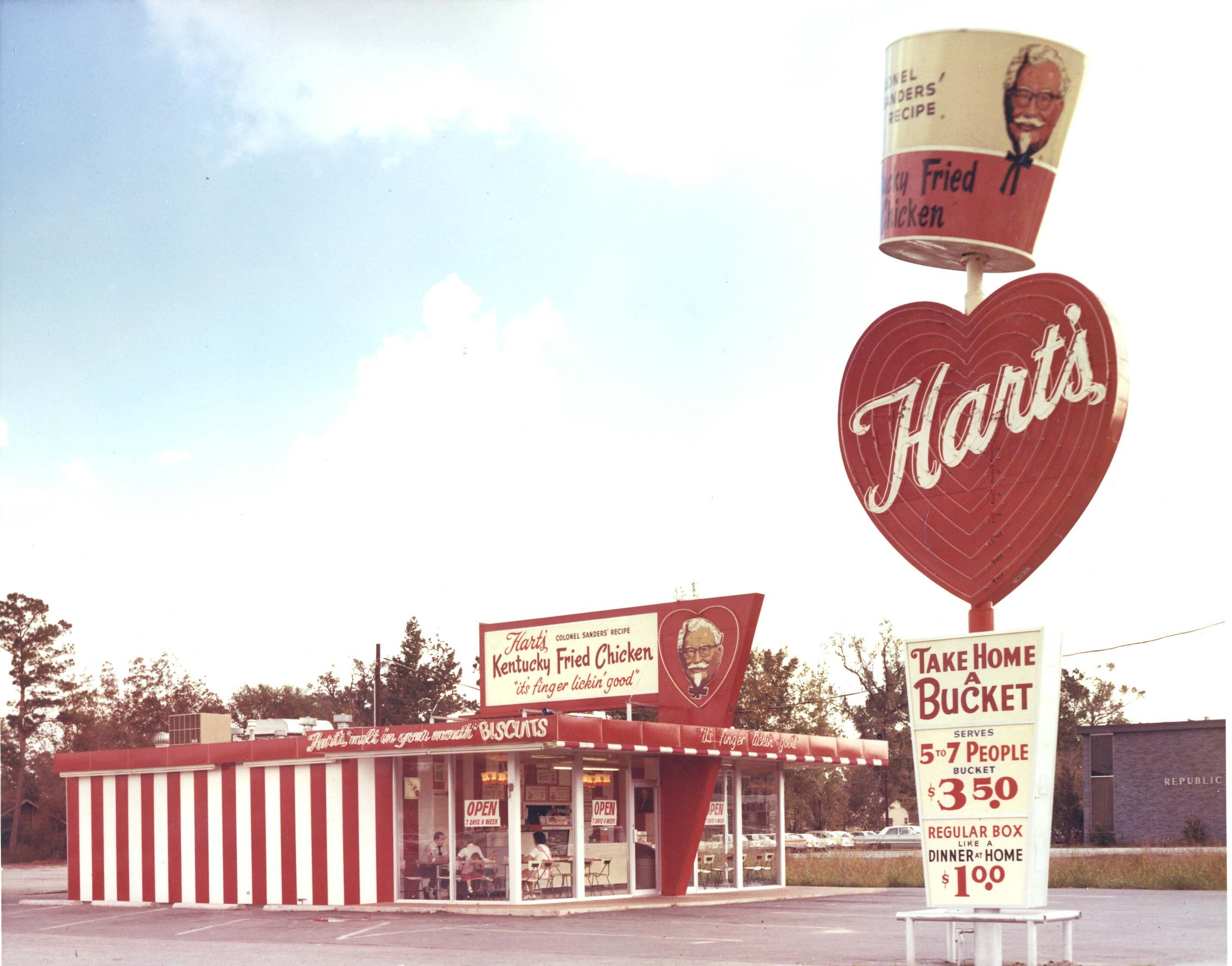
Kentucky Fried Chicken Restaurant under Hart's ownership

Born in Edgefield, Alabama, to Yancy and Mary Georgia Hartzog, he was the sixteenth of eighteen children.

He graduated from Bakerhill High School in 1948.

== Career ==
Hartzog began his career in the food business as a bookkeeper at A&P Groceries. He later moved to Food Center Groceries in Memphis, Tennessee, as a manager. In 1964, he relocated to Houston to open 25 Hart's Kentucky Fried Chicken restaurants within 2½ years. Colonel Sanders, the founder of Kentucky Fried Chicken, signed up Hartzog as the last franchisee and considered him a friend. In 1968, Hartzog expanded his ventures by franchising 20 Roy Rogers Roast Beef restaurants in Texas, Arizona, California, and New York. Two years later, he acquired Kentucky Fried Chicken restaurants in New Orleans and Baton Rouge. In 1972, Hartzog started his own chicken restaurant chain, Hartz Chicken, which eventually grew to 45 stores across Texas, Mississippi, Alabama, and Georgia. He sold the chain in 1986 and retired in Ft. Walton Beach, Florida.

== Personal life ==
Hartzog married Dorothy Elaine Burch on March 14, 1951, in Montgomery, Alabama. The couple had four children. They returned to Texas to be closer to their grandchildren and great-grandchildren, eventually settling on lakefront property on Lake Limestone in Groesbeck, Texas. Hartzog served as a Deacon/Elder in various congregations and was a member of the Groesbeck Church of Christ.

Hartzog died due to a heart aneurysm on August 29, 2004.
