= Albin Herzog =

Swiss mathematician

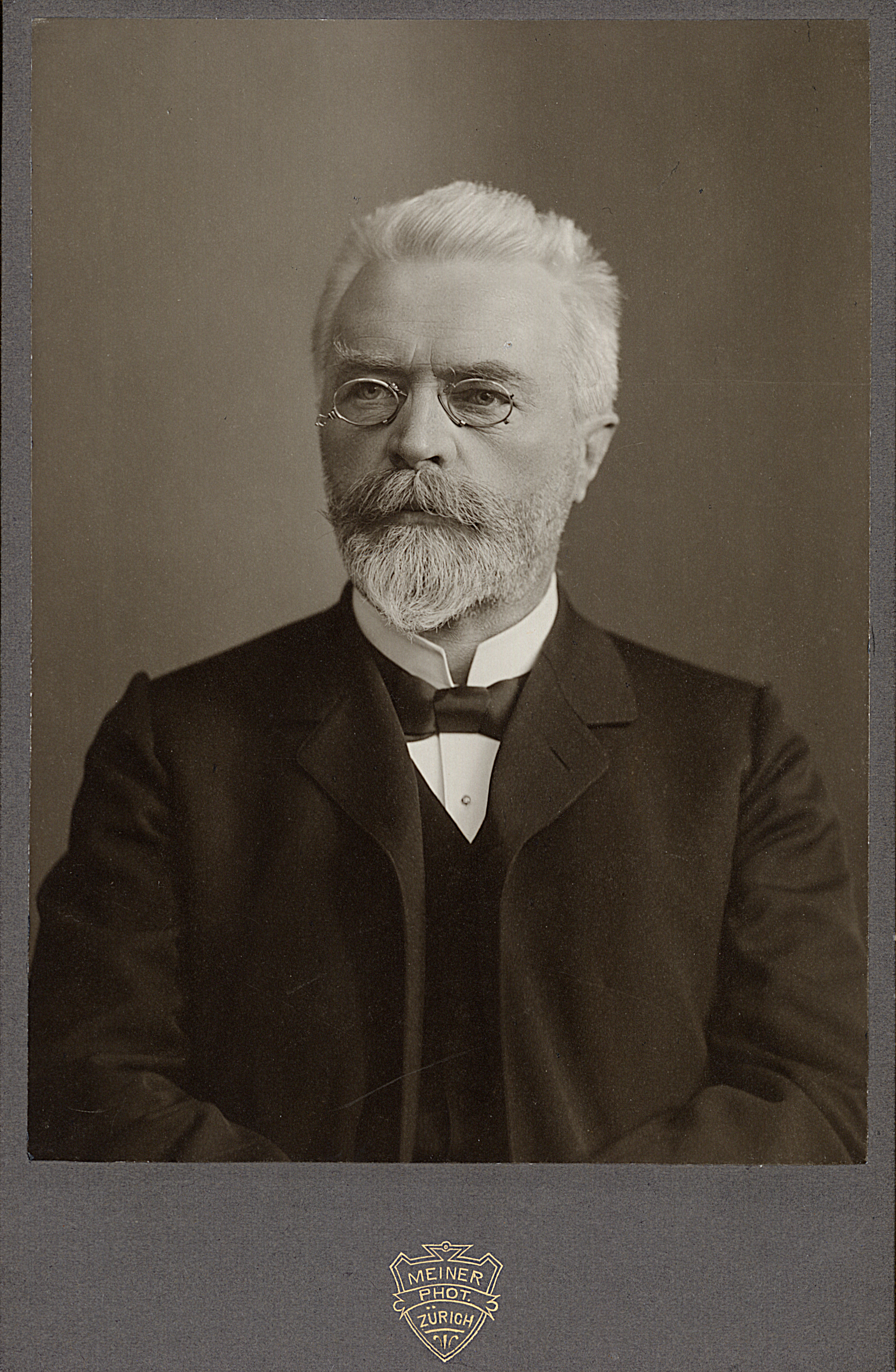
- Born: October 26, 1852; Homburg, Switzerland
- Died: June 13, 1909 (aged 56); Mammern, Switzerland
- Education: ETH Zurich
- Spouse: Elise Bucher
- Scientific career
- Fields: Mathematics
- Workplaces: ETH Zurich
- Thesis: Bestimmung einiger speciellen Minimal-flächen (1875)

Albin Herzog (1852–1909) was a Swiss mathematician who was director of the ETH Zurich.

== Life and work ==
Herzog studied in the high schools of Steckborn and Frauenfeld. Between 1870 and 1874 he studied mathematics al Polytechnicum of Zurich and in 1875 he was awarded a doctorate from the University of Zurich. The same year he began teaching at Polytechnicum of Zurich, where he remained the rest of his life, as director of the Mechanical Technical Department and General Manager from 1895 to 1899. During his time as general manager, Albert Einstein flunked the entrance exam, failing in French, chemistry, and biology, but Herzog seeing his extraordinary marks in physics and mathematics, recommended Einstein spend a year in the cantonalschule of Aarau, promising to admit him the following year.

Herzog was an outstanding professor who connected the mathematical basis of mechanics with his practical applications. He also published several articles on mathematical mechanics.

Besides his academic activities, Herzog was president of the escolar commission (1889–1993) and councilor of the city of Zurich.

== Bibliography ==
- Eminger, Stefanie Ursula (2015). Carl Friedrich Geiser and Ferdinand Rudio: The Men Behind the First International Congress of Mathematicians (PDF). St. Andrews University.
- Herzog, Albin (1987). "Albin Herzog (1852-1909) - (Notizen zu Vorlesungen und andere Handschriften, Vorlesungen und Vorlesungsnachschriften)". Handschriften und Autographen der ETH-Bibliothek (in German) (83). doi:10.3929/ethz-a-000414176.
- Kaku, Michio (2004). El universo de Einstein (in Spanish). Antoni Bosch. ISBN 84-95348-17-9.
- Stodola, Aurel (1909). Prof. Dr. Albin Herzog. 1852-1909 (in German). Sauerländer.
