= Ricola =

Swiss confectionery company

- Type: Aktiengesellschaft (AG)
- Founded: 1930; 96 years ago
- Founder: Emil Wilhelm Richterich
- Headquarters: Laufen, Switzerland
- Key people: Thomas P. Meier (CEO)
- Products: Cough drops, breath mints
- Revenue: 350.2 Million CHF (Swiss francs) (2023)
- Number of employees: 588 (31 December 2024)
- Website: www.ricola.com

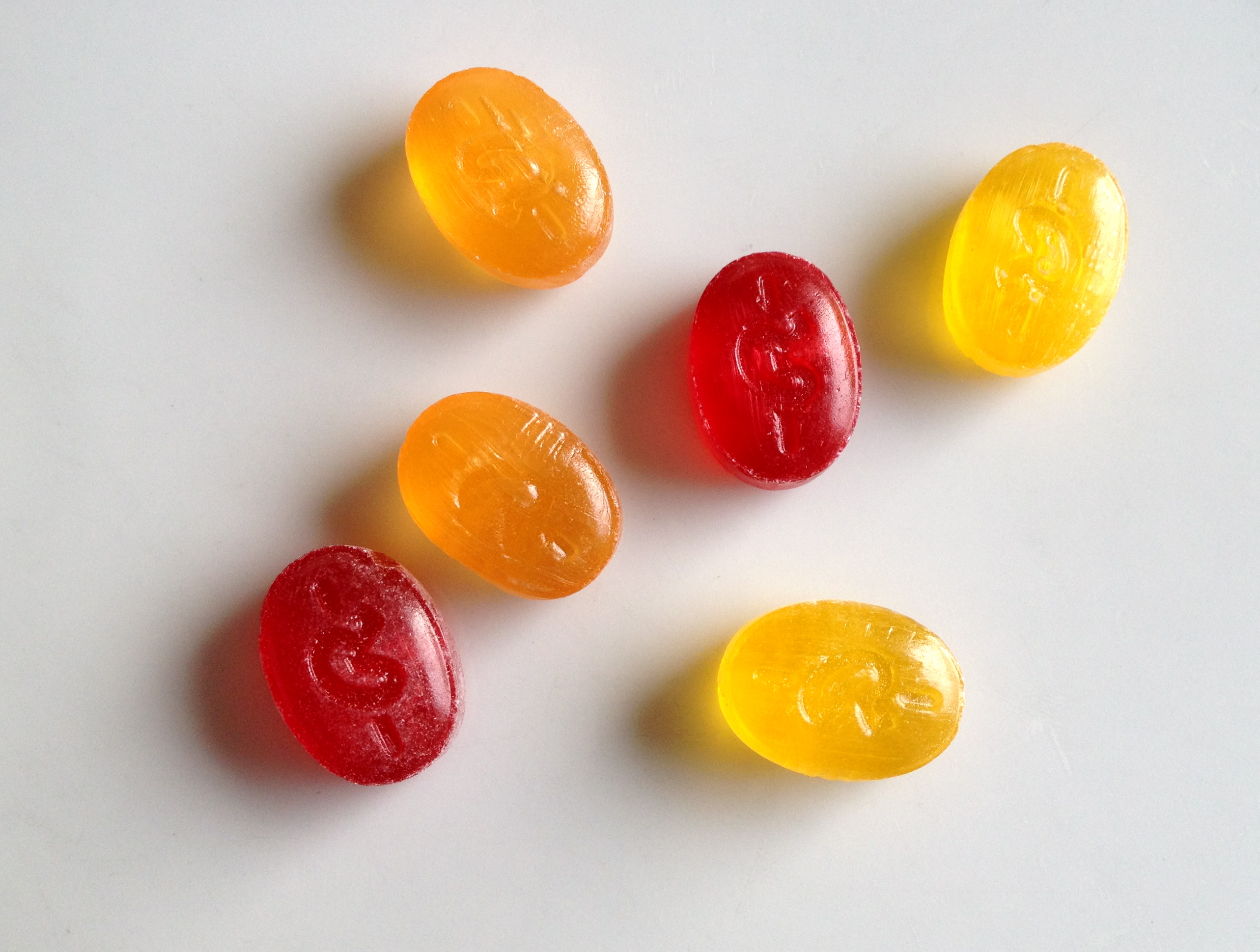
Ricola Bonbons

Ricola Ltd./Ricola AG is a Swiss manufacturer of cough drops, instant tea, tea bags, and breath mints. The head office of Ricola is located in Laufen, Basel-Country, and has subsidiaries in Italy, Great Britain, Asia, and the United States. According to the company, it exports to around 45 countries in Europe, Asia, and North America.

== Business ==
Ricola is a family business owned by the Richterich family; the Chairman of the Board of Directors is Felix Richterich. At the end of November 2011, he also took over the position of managing director until he was replaced by Thomas P. Meier in May 2019. Since then, the operational management of Ricola Group AG has been entirely in the hands of executives who do not belong to the owning family.

From 2014 to the end of 2018, Eva Richterich, daughter of Alfred Richterich, was Vice President of the Board of Directors of Ricola. Eva Richterich left the Board of Directors at the end of 2018 when she joined the management of Ricola Group AG. At the end of 2020, Eva Richterich left Group Management and devoted herself to her strategic role as a member of the Board of Directors of Ricola Familienholding AG. After several years in operational management, Raphael Richterich, son of Felix Richterich and representative of the fourth generation of the family, was elected to the Board of Directors of Ricola Group AG in 2018, becoming Vice President in 2019.

Ricola is a member of the Interessengemeinschaft Tee, Gewürze und verwandte Produkte (Interest Group for Tea, Spices, and Related Products; IGTG).

Ricola listed sales of 307.2 million Swiss francs in 2016 and employs 400 workers. Around 200 independent production companies in the surrounding area service Ricola. In order to obtain enough herbs for the production of its herbal drops, the firm contracts over 100 self-managed farms in the Valais, Emmental, Val Poschiavo and at the southern foot of the Jura Mountains, in central Switzerland, and in Ticino. Ricola is known for its commercials featuring Heidi (Ramona Pringle) depicting mountaineers shouting "Ri-co-la!" and blowing through a large Alphorn.

A class action suit in February 2019 alleged non-natural ingredients (malic acid, aspartame, citric acid, sorbitol, ascorbic acid, sodium ascorbate) while labels say "Naturally Soothing" or "Naturally Helps Support Immune System". In November 2019 the judge dismissed two claims and let two claims proceed. An earlier class action suit in November 2015 alleged industrially synthesized ingredients were used (ascorbic acid, citric acid, and malic acid) while labels stated "Naturally Soothing". The suit was withdrawn without explanation in January 2016.

== History ==
Ricola began in 1930 when master baker Emil Wilhelm Richterich and Daniel Ruoss Sr. established Confiseriefabrik Richterich & Co. Laufen after the purchase of a small bakery in his birthplace Laufen, just outside Basel. Under Richterich, the bakery specialized in confectionery such as Fünfermocken, a sweet similar to caramel. In 1940 Richterich experimented with the healing power of herbs and created Ricola's Swiss Herbal Sweet incorporating a blend of 13 herbs, which remains almost unchanged today. In the 1950s the sweet became appreciated for its ability to be dissolved in boiling water, creating an aromatic herbal tea or tisane, which inspired Richterich to create a Ricola Herbal Tea a few years later.

In 1967, Emil Richterich and his sons Hans Peter and Alfred renamed the company Ricola, an abbreviation of Richterich & Compagnie Laufen. Export began in the 1970s, introducing Ricola's products to foreign markets in Japan, Hong Kong, Singapore, and the United States. At the end of the decade, Ricola moved to a new purpose-built factory in the vicinity of Laufen, where its headquarters are still located.

In 1976, after extensive research on sugar-free confectionery, Ricola launched Switzerland’s first chewable sugarless herbal sweet. Ricola first started to advertise its products on television in the 1980s, an era that saw increased awareness of the need for good dental hygiene, increasing the demand for sugar-free products such as the ones that Ricola offered. In 1985, the cooperation with Swiss farmers for the natural cultivation of herbs according to Bio Suisse standards began. The Klosterfrau Healthcare Group has been responsible for the distribution of Ricola products in Germany since 1987. In 1988 the company started packaging their products in small boxes. In 2019, sales in Germany switched to CFP Brands, a joint venture in which Ricola participated.

In 1993, the confectionery producer Disch from Othmarsingen was taken over, which was sold to the investment company Alrupa Finanz Holding in 2015. Disch produces the brands Sportmint and Mocken, which belong to Ricola.

In 2006, the company put a state-of-the-art candy factory into operation in Laufen and in 2014 the new Kräuterzentrum production building was put into operation at the same location. It is made of clay and is the largest clay house in Europe. The construction was developed by the Austrian ceramist and clay building pioneer Martin Rauch, the architects were Herzog & de Meuron.

In 2022, the company opened the first Ricola shop in Paris, where customers can also create their own sweets. In March 2023, the company opened its Ricola shop in Laufen, Switzerland.

In 2023, Ricola and IP-SUISSE agreed on a long-term partnership for the sustainable cultivation of sugar beets to produce 25,000 tons of sugar annually without the use of fungicides, insecticides, and herbicides.

In December 2023, Ricola was certified as a B Corporation by the non-profit organisation B Lab.

The company is now managed by Thomas P. Meier as CEO and Felix Richterich as President of the Board. Today, Ricola exports to over 50 countries in Asia, North America and Europe.

== Ingredients ==
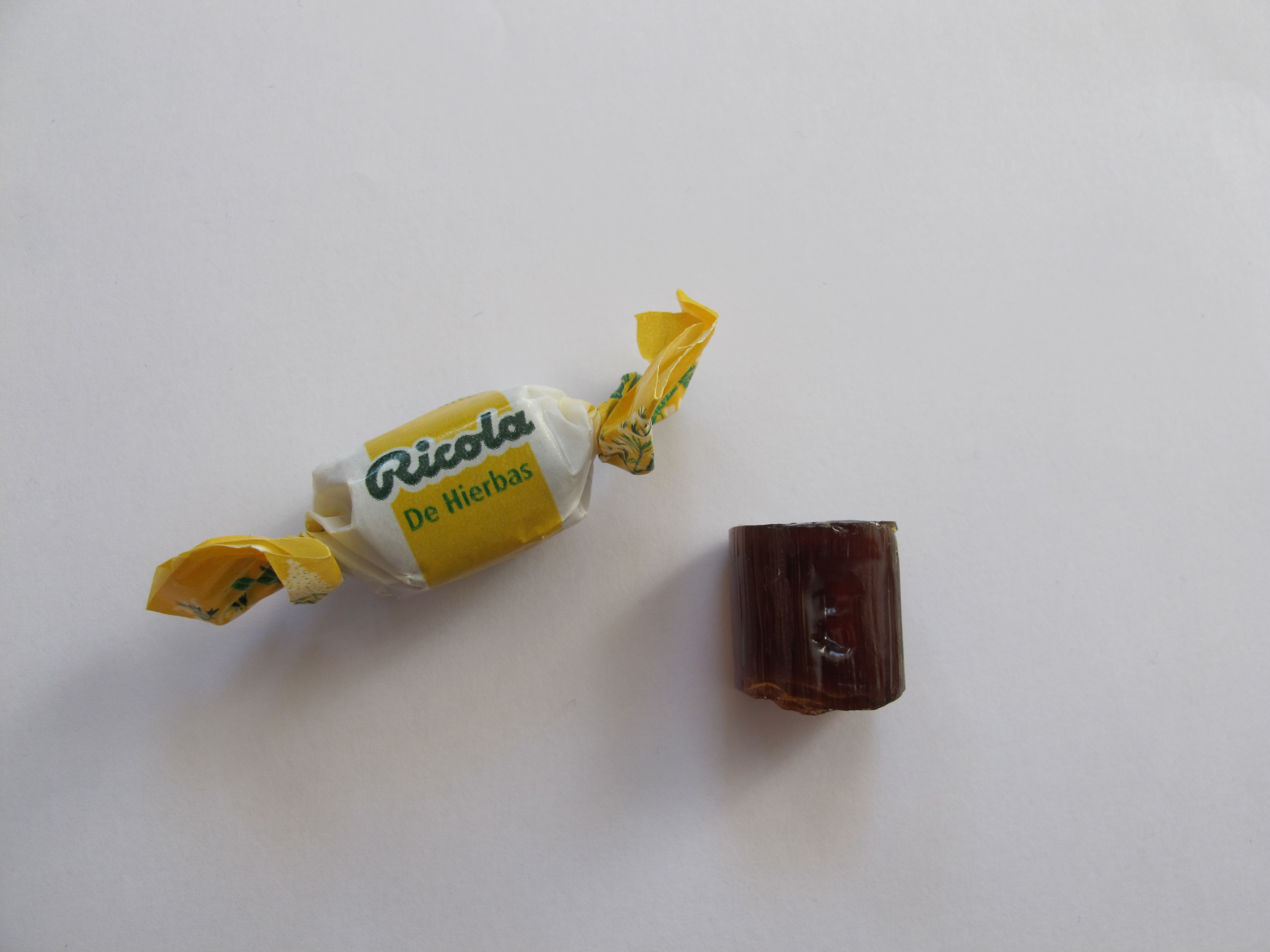
Ricola herbal cough drop

While the active ingredient in most Ricola products is menthol, an important part of Ricola products is the herb mixture. The following herbs are noted as being part of Ricola's classic blend of 13 herbs:

- Elder (Sambucus nigra)
- Horehound (Marrubium vulgare)
- Mallow (Malva silvestris)
- Peppermint (Mentha × piperita)
- Sage (Salvia officinalis)
- Thyme (Thymus vulgaris)
- Cowslip (Primula veris)
- Burnet (Pimpinella saxifraga)
- Yarrow (Achillea millefolium)
- Marsh mallow (Althaea officinalis)
- Lady's mantle (Alchemilla vulgaris)
- Speedwell, a.k.a. veronica (Veronica officinalis)
- Ribwort plantain (Plantago lanceolata)

In the US market, ten herbs make up the herbal mixture, three of which are not in the list above. These are linden flowers (Tilia platyphyllos), wild thyme (Thymus serpyllum) and hyssop (Hyssopus officinalis).

The company offers over 60 types of herbal sweets that are supplemented with essential oils, natural flavourings, or vitamin C. All Ricola products are manufactured in Laufen, where Ricola produces 7 billion candies a year. Variants available in Switzerland include Herbs Original, Lemon Balm, Honey Herbs, Orange Mint, Herbs Caramel, Honey Sage, Echinacea Honey Lemon, Cranberry, Mixed Berry, Sage, Elderflower, Glacial Mint, Eucalyptus and Calendula.

Sugar-free versions are also available. Since the beginning of 2022, some of their products have been sweetened with steviol glycosides from the stevia plant. As of November 2023, the official US Ricola site mentioned their continuing use of aspartame artificial sweetener in some products, as well as a stevia-sweetened option.

Ricola products are also gluten-free, halal, and kosher.

The product range is tailored to each market individually. For example, filled sweets are also available in Germany and North America. All Ricola products are based on the 13-herb mixture. It also contains isomalt, which carries a risk of intestinal distress when consumed in large quantities (above about 20–30 g (1 oz) per day).

== Ricola herb gardens ==
Ricola has five display gardens in Switzerland. They are open to the public and visitors to the herb gardens can learn about the original herbal blend in their natural environment and learn about the cultivation and power of herbs from May to September. The gardens are located at the following locations:

- Nenzlingen, near the company headquarters
- Trogberg, a mountain in the canton of Solothurn
- Kandersteg in the Berner Oberland
- Zermatt in the Valais
- Pontresina in the southern part of Grisons

The herbs used to produce Ricola's cough drops are not cultivated in these gardens, but in natural plantations in the Swiss mountains in accordance with strict organic or BioSuisse guidelines. Ricola ensures that its cultivation areas are not situated near industrial sites or the road networks to avoid contact with harmful pollutants. Over 100 self-managed farms are under contract to Ricola in the Valais, Emmental, Puschlav and the Jura Mountains, in Central Switzerland and Ticino. They grow the herbs for Ricola products on an area equivalent to 124 soccer fields. No pesticides, insecticides or herbicides are used in herb cultivation.

== Ricola Experience Trail Arosa ==
In cooperation with Arosa Tourism, Ricola opened the Ricola Adventure Trail in Arosa in 2021. The 3 km (1.9 mi) trail, features ten interactive stations where visitors can learn about bees, the cultivation and importance of herbs, and the production of Ricola's herb drops. The trail complements Ricola's five public herb gardens and offers an additional educational experience in the Swiss Alps, combining information about biodiversity, Swiss herb cultivation and the company's history.

== Advertising ==
In 1980, the jingle was introduced for Ricola that is still used today. In the commercials, Ramona Pringle, among others, sings the characteristic "RIII-CO-LAAAAAAA"; in some videos she imitates Heidi.

In 1998 the first videos of the advertising campaign with the slogan Wer hat's erfunden? ('Who invented it?') aired. The ads were filmed in Finland (1998), Australia (1998), England (1999), Mexico (2000), China (2004), Brazil (2004), and Greenland (2008). The actor was Erich Vock.

Since 2013, Ricola has advertised internationally with the Swiss-German slogan Chrüterchraft ('herbal power'). "Chrüterchraft is a Swiss word. It stands for herbs, for effect and enjoyment. All Ricola values are contained in this one word: the magical mixture of herbs and the Swiss origin, beneficial effect and good taste of our products”, said Felix Richterich, CEO and Chairman of the Board of Directors of Ricola, to Blick.ch.

Ricola then launched the "Wish you Well" campaign, which ran from 2018. In autumn 2021, it was replaced by the new advertising campaign "Just take Ricola", which has since been broadcast across Europe. "With the new advertising campaign, we wanted to focus on what makes Ricola special: naturally grown alpine herbs, the Swiss origin of our company and the balance between enjoyment and functionality of the products. These are the cornerstones of Ricola's success and we will continue to build on them in the future. And as our commercial makes it clear, a pinch of humor plays an important role at Ricola", said Thomas P. Meier, CEO of Ricola, to Werbewoche. The advertising campaign also included a revision of the packaging and the logo.

=== Consumer deception lawsuit ===
In 2022, Ricola was sued in the US for deceiving consumers. The plaintiff claimed that the packaging implied that Swiss herbs would soothe a sore throat, when in fact menthol was the only ingredient with this effect. The accuser requested US$5 million in damages. Ricola, on the other hand, claimed that it had "correctly complied with all regulations at all times". The motion was dismissed in 2024 for lack of subject matter jurisdiction.
