= Karl Herzog =

German soldier and Knight's Cross recipients

- Born: 6 July 1906; Nuremberg
- Died: 25 January 1998 (aged 91)
- Military career
- Allegiance: Nazi Germany; West Germany
- Branch: Army
- Service years: ?–1945; 1957–66
- Rank: Oberst (Wehrmacht); Generalmajor (Bundeswehr)
- Conflicts: Zemland Offensive
- Awards: Knight's Cross of the Iron Cross

Karl Herzog (6 July 1906 – 25 January 1998) was a German officer in the Wehrmacht during World War II. He was a recipient of the Knight's Cross of the Iron Cross.

Herzog surrendered to the Red Army in the course of the Soviet April 1945 Zemland Offensive. Convicted as a war criminal in the Soviet Union, he was held until 1955. Herzog joined the Bundeswehr in 1957 and retired in 1966 as a Generalmajor.

== Awards and decorations ==
- Knight's Cross of the Iron Cross on 17 April 1945 as Oberstleutnant and commander of Heeres Sturm-Pionier-Brigade 627 (motorisiert)
