= Buckminster Fuller: Thinking Out Loud =

- Directed by: Karen Goodman; Kirk Simon
- Screenplay by: Karen Goodman; Jan Hartman; Kirk Simon
- Produced by: Karen Goodman; Kirk Simon
- Narrated by: Morley Safer
- Cinematography: Buddy Squires; Terry Hopkins
- Edited by: Sara Fishko
- Music by: Brian Keane
- Production companies: Simon & Goodman Picture Company
- Release date: 1996
- Running time: 90 minutes
- Country: United States
- Language: English

Buckminster Fuller: Thinking Out Loud is a 1996 PBS American Masters documentary drama film on the inventor, visionary, and thinker R. Buckminster Fuller produced and directed by Academy Award nominees Karen Goodman and Kirk Simon.

== Summary ==
Fuller, who died in 1983, is considered by some to be one of the 20th century's most noteworthy, controversial, and creative thinkers. The film looks at his unconventional life, his innovations, and his radical view of the contemporary world. Best known as the inventor of the Geodesic Dome, Fuller had many other inventions, such as an air-streamed three-wheeled car and many other ideas of how to "benefit mankind."

The film includes interviews with Philip Johnson, Merce Cunningham, John Cage and Arthur Penn. It is narrated by Morley Safer, with Spalding Gray as the voice of Buckminster Fuller.

== Production ==
The filmmakers were the first journalists to have open access to the vast collections of Fuller's personal papers. As Fuller was widely documented, the film includes extensive archival footage of Fuller from many sources.

== Release ==
The film premiered in competition at the Sundance Film Festival in 1996, where it was reportedly well-received. It screened in New York City at the Portrait of an Architect Museum of Television and Radio on April 2, 1996, and aired on PBS on April 10. It was later included as part of an exhibition on Fuller that traveled throughout the U.S. from February 1998 to December 2001.

Zeitgeist Films handled VHS distribution.

== Critical reception ==
Joe Leydon, writing for Variety stated that the film was "efficiently made", but was too "awe-struck" by its subject. Leydon noted that some of the sections were repetitive. Diane Hatch-Avis, writing for Magill's Cinema Annual, also noted the repetition, calling some of the interviews redundant. Hatch-Avis also noted that the sound quality of the archival footage shown is poor enough "that at times [Fuller] is unintelligible." Despite its flaws, Hatch-Avis said that it "is a long overdue tribute."

== Accolades ==
The documentary was nominated for an Emmy for Best Cultural/Historical Documentary the same year.

It also received the Alfred I. duPont–Columbia University Award Silver Baton for independent television production in 1997.
