= Masterclass (TV series) =

American documentary television series

Masterclass is an American documentary television series airing on HBO. Each half-hour episode documents the experience of a small group of young artists working with a famous mentor. The series premiered on HBO on April 18, 2010, with opera star Plácido Domingo working with three aspiring young singers.

The students in the program are chosen from participants in the Miami-based organization, YoungArts, a program of the National Foundation for Advancement in the Arts, which supports emerging artists. The series is produced and directed by Karen Goodman and Kirk Simon of the Simon & Goodman Picture Company. The Executive Producer is Lin Arison.

== Episodes ==
Season	Episodes	Originally released	
Season	Episodes	First released	Last released
1	9	April 18, 2010	June 27, 2010
2	7	May 28, 2012	May 22, 2013
3	5	September 9, 2013	October 14, 2014

=== Season 1 (2010) ===
No. overall	No. in season	Title	Original release date
1	1	Plácido Domingo	April 18, 2010
Spanish opera star Plácido Domingo works with three young singers focusing not on technique but on how to convey feeling and emotion in their performances.
2	2	Liv Ullmann	April 25, 2010
Norwegian actress and director Liv Ullmann works with a group of young actors on scenes from A Streetcar Named Desire.
3	3	Edward Albee	May 2, 2010
American playwright Edward Albee, whose works include Who's Afraid of Virginia Woolf? The Zoo Story, and A Delicate Balance, works with four budding playwrights to share his analysis of their work.
4	4	Jacques d'Amboise	May 9, 2010
American ballet dancer and choreographer Jacques d'Amboise helps a group of young dancers to create a dance in five hours and then takes the show to the Jacob's Pillow Dance Festival.
5	5	Olafur Eliasson	May 16, 2010
Danish installation artist Olafur Eliasson, whose works include New York City Waterfalls and The Weather Project at London's Tate Modern museum, invites 5 young artists to his studio in Berlin and works with them on an environmental art project.
6	6	Frank Gehry	June 9, 2010
Canadian-American architect Frank Gehry, whose buildings include Guggenheim Museum in Bilbao and the Walt Disney Concert Hall in Los Angeles, works with aspiring architects on a city-planning project.
7	7	Bill T. Jones	June 13, 2010
American dancer and choreographer Bill T. Jones, who founded the Bill T. Jones/Arnie Zane Dance Company and has choreographed for film, Broadway, and opera, works with seven young people (a writer/actress, Alix Briggs, a choreographer, Kacey Hauk, and a supporting cast of three dancers and two actors) to create an original work in three days.
8	8	Michael Tilson Thomas	June 18, 2010
Michael Tilson Thomas, conductor of the San Francisco Symphony and the New World Symphony Orchestra, works with three young virtuoso musicians.
9	9	Julian Schnabel	June 27, 2010
American artist and filmmaker Julian Schnabel invites a group of young photographers, painters and sculptors into his studio for a critique of their work and a discussion of how he approaches his own work.

=== Season 2 (2012–13) ===
No. overall	No. in season	Title	Original release date
10	1	Renée Fleming	May 28, 2012
11	2	Bobby McFerrin	February 12, 2013
12	3	John Guare	March 4, 2013
13	4	Patti LuPone	April 1, 2013
14	5	James Rosenquist	May 22, 2013
15	6	Bruce Weber	May 22, 2013
16	7	Kathleen Turner	May 22, 2013

=== Season 3 (2013–14) ===
No. overall	No. in season	Title	Original release date
17	1	Wynton Marsalis	September 9, 2013
18	2	Josh Groban	January 21, 2014
19	3	Anna Deavere Smith	February 17, 2014
20	4	Alan Alda	September 16, 2014
21	5	Joshua Bell	October 14, 2014

== Awards ==
=== Primetime Emmy Awards ===
Year	Category	Nominee(s)	Episode	Result	Ref.
2011	Outstanding Children's Nonfiction, Reality or Reality-Competition Program	Lin Arison, Karen Goodman, Kirk Simon	N/A	Nominated	
2013	Outstanding Children's Program	Sheila Nevins, Lin Arison, Jackie Glover, Karen Goodman, Kirk Simon	N/A	Nominated	
2014	Outstanding Children's Program	Sheila Nevins, Lin Arison, Jackie Glover, Karen Goodman, Kirk Simon	Wynton Marsalis	Nominated	
2015	Outstanding Children's Program	Sheila Nevins, Lin Arison, Jacqueline Glover, Karen Goodman, Kirk Simon	Alan Alda	Won	
