= Coming Out Stories =

2006 American reality television series

- Genre: Reality television
- Created by: Lauren Lazin
- Directed by: Karen Goodman; Kirk Simon
- Narrated by: Kevin Thoms
- Country of origin: United States
- Original language: English
- No. of seasons: 1
- No. of episodes: 8

Production
- Executive producers: Lauren Lazin; Eileen Opatut
- Producers: Karen Goodman; Kirk Simon
- Editor: Emily Williams
- Camera setup: Greg Andracke; Buddy Squires; Kirk Simon; Steve McCarthy
- Running time: 30 minutes

Original release
- Network: Logo
- Release: February 16 – April 6, 2006

Coming Out Stories is an American reality television series that premiered on the LGBT-themed Logo television network with its first episode on February 16, 2006. Each episode follows a particular gay or lesbian individual's preparation and coming out to a particular person or group of people. The shows were produced by four time Academy Award nominees Kirk Simon and Karen Goodman.

So far, there has been one season, which consisted of eight episodes, that ended in October 2006 and has subsequently been rerun periodically. Episodes are also available on Logo's official website, and can be downloaded in the iPod format via iTunes.

The series won a 2007 Insight Award and was nominated for the National Association for Multi-Ethnicity in Communications (NAMEC) award that honors those who create outstanding content that depicts the world's rich, multi-ethnic experiences.

== Episode list ==
Episode #	Title (Subject)	Airdate	Overview
1	"Mom, I'm a Lesbian" (Karen)	February 16, 2006	Logo explores the reactions, consequences, and rewards of coming to terms with one's sexual identity and sharing that personal discovery with others. In this episode, we meet a dynamic woman who comes out to her mother, who has a fatal brain disease and about one year to live, and her sister as well. The touching scene where the young woman comes out to her sister goes unedited for about two minutes, very unusual for an MTV station or for that matter, any broadcast documentary.
2	"The Mayor" (Chris)	February 23, 2006	Christopher Cabaldon is the mayor of West Sacramento. Early in his career, he forfeited a personal life in order to enter politics. Now a respected mayor at age 40, Chris is unwilling to continue living a lie. Fueled by a desire to create positive change in community attitudes, Chris comes out at his annual State of the City address. The events depicted in the program were front page news in Sacramento.
3	"Son of the Islands" (Xavior)	March 2, 2006	Xavior is a counselor at a gay rights organization in Harlem, helping young men come out to their families. But his Jamaican heritage keeps him in fear of his own coming out. Realizing his hypocrisy, Xavior decides to practice what he preaches, and comes out to his father in Florida. Venturing further still, he then travels to Jamaica to confront his heritage and Jamaica's homophobic attitudes.
4	"Gay in Kansas" (Tom)	March 9, 2006	Tom, a public speaking professor at a Kansas community college, encounters traditional Bible Belt values everywhere, including within his own family. Even his sister Gina, his closest relative and best friend, does not know he is gay. Despite the homophobia that surrounds him, Gina's struggle with breast cancer forces Tom to come out so that he can share his life—and what remains of hers—openly.
5	"My Ex-Wife" (Scott)	March 15, 2006	Scott and his wife Tracy were married for 11 years and had 3 kids. Now divorced, they share joint custody of the children and maintain a rocky relationship. Scott's decided to finally tell Tracy who he is on the day he receives his final divorce papers, whether she wants to hear it or not.
6	"The Identical Twin" (Van)	March 23, 2006	For years, Van has hidden the fact that she is gay from her identical twin sister. Van is a liberal and a lesbian; her sister is conservative and straight. Van has tried a number of times to come out to her sister, "the other half of my egg," but has never been able to get the words out. Now that she is a host for Boise Pride and the leader of a drag king band, she feels it's time to tell her twin.
7	"My Traditional Korean Mom" (JP)	March 30, 2006	JP is very close to her traditional Korean mother - she even has her mom's name tattooed down her arm. But she's terrified to come out to her—so much so that she won't hold hands with her girlfriend if there are any Asians within sight in case word gets back home. Now she feels it's time to conquer her fears and tell her mom who she really is, even if it means losing the bond they share.
8	"Hip Hop & Ready to Drop" (Trish)	April 6, 2006	Trish (aka Feloni) is a rising performer in the Detroit hip-hop scene. Although she is already out in the male dominated world of hip-hop and in her songs writes openly about her sexuality; her family remains in the dark. She needs to drop the news before the release of her debut album. Feloni's songs can be found on iTunes.
