= YoungArts =

American high school scholarship program

- Established: 1981
- Founder: Lin Arison; Ted Arison
- Type: Charity
- Headquarters: Miami, Florida

YoungArts (previously National YoungArts Foundation and National Foundation for Advancement in the Arts, or NFAA) is an American charity established by Lin and Ted Arison to support high-school artists. The foundation is based in Miami, Florida and began in 1981.

From 1982 to 2025, YoungArts nominated candidates for consideration as U.S. Presidential Scholars in the Arts.

== Leadership ==
YoungArts’ board of trustees is chaired by Sarah Arison, granddaughter of founders Lin and Ted Arison..

Clive Chang, previously a vice president at Lincoln Center, has served as President and CEO of YoungArts since 2023.

== Other programs and activities ==
Several documentaries have been produced highlighting this program and its award recipients. In 2007, Rehearsing a Dream, produced by the Simon and Goodman Picture Company, was nominated for the Academy Award for Documentary Short Subject. An Emmy-winning documentary television series entitled YoungArts MasterClass, in which program alumni were teamed with famous mentors aired for three seasons on HBO. YoungArts developed a study guide, based on the HBO series, for high school teachers with Teachers College, Columbia University.

== Notable alumni ==
- Abigail Barlow
- Amanda Gorman
- Talia Suskauer
- Jason Vieaux
- Hynden Walch
- Kerry Washington
- Michael Benjamin Washington
- Grace Weber
- Kehinde Wiley
- Vanessa Williams
- Anthony Wilson
- Finn Wittrock
- Tony Yazbeck
- Chris Young
