= Felony (disambiguation) =

A felony is a type of crime.

Felony may also refer to:

- Felony (album), an album by Emmure
- Felony (band), an American band popular in the 1980s
- Felony (film), a 2013 Australian film
- Felony (1994 film) with Lance Henriksen
- Jayo Felony (born 1969), American rapper

== See also ==
- Feloni, American rapper
