= Werner Braun (photojournalist) =

Israeli photographer (1918–2018)

Werner Braun ורנר בראון
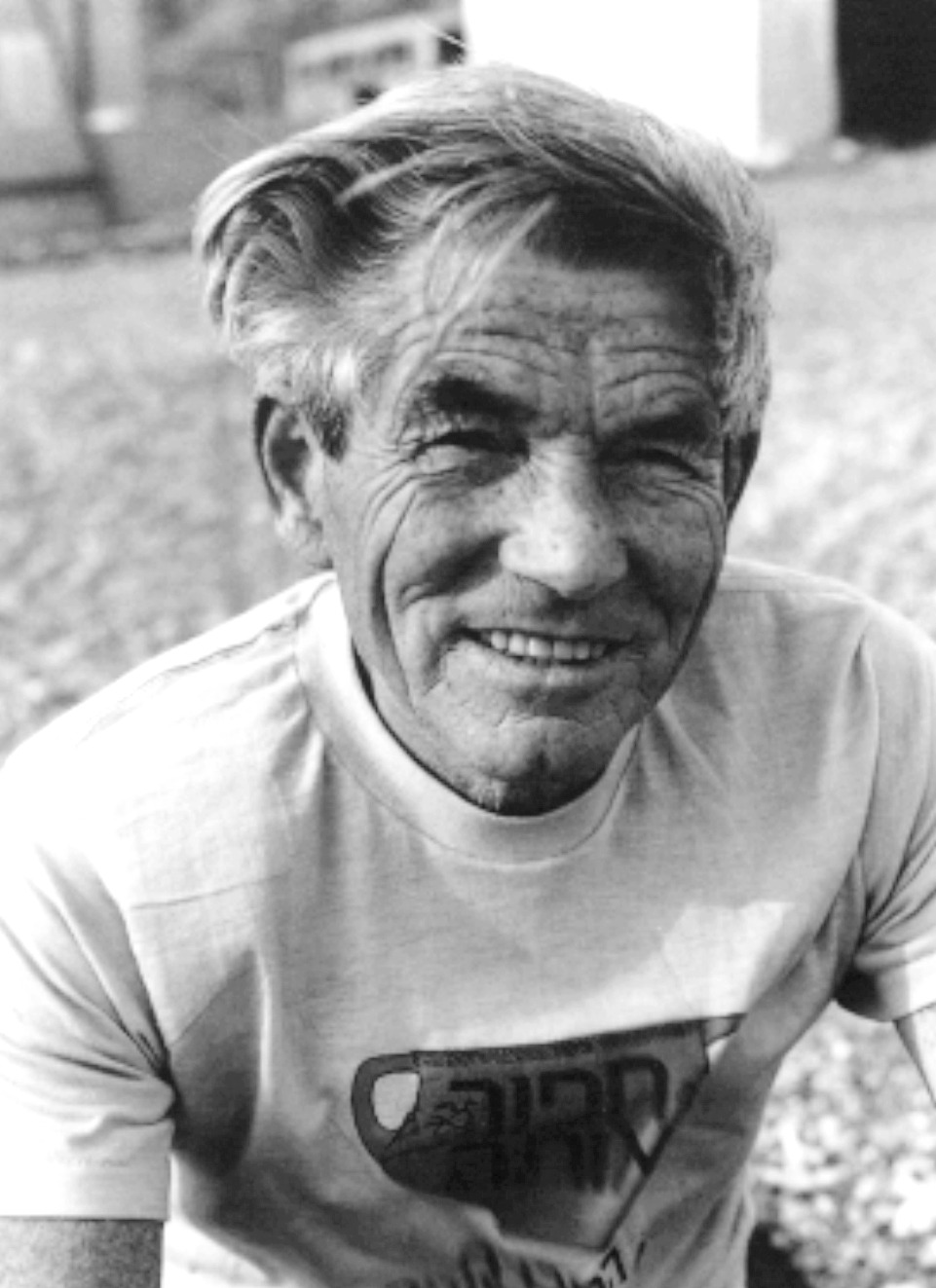
- Born: 12 June 1918; Nuremberg, Germany
- Died: 25 December 2018 (aged 100)
- Known for: photography
- Movement: photojournalism

Werner Braun (Hebrew: ורנר בראון; 12 June 1918 – 25 December 2018) was an Israeli photographer, considered a founder of photojournalism in Israel.

== Biography ==
Werner Brown was born in Nuremberg, Germany. Braun started to take photos at the age of 18. In 1937, with the rise of the Nazi regime, he left Germany, first to Denmark and then to Sweden. He immigrated to Mandatory Palestine with his wife and two children in 1946.

== Photography career ==
Braun's body of work includes photographs of Adolf Eichmann on trial, Israeli landscapes and portraits of Israelis, both legendary figures and ordinary citizens. Braun was also Israel's first underwater photographer.

Braun was influenced by the technique and aesthetics of the New Photography of his native Germany and similar European photographic currents of the 1930s, with the journalistic spirit of French photographer Henri Cartier-Bresson and Jewish-American photographer Robert Capa, whom Braun explicitly mentioned, playing a particular role. Braun's work however exudes a much more liberated feeling, imbued as it is by the spirit of Israeliness that took shape along with the newly established state.

== Awards ==
- 1954, First Prize, Photography Competition, The Bezalel National Museum, Jerusalem (a precursor of the Israel Museum art wing)
- 1979, Third Prize, Nikon Photo Contest International
- 1989, Enrique Kavlin Life Achievement Award for Photography, Israel Museum
- 2007, Lifetime Achievement Award, the Jerusalem Film Festival and the Forum for the Preservation of Audiovisual Memory in Israel

== Exhibitions ==
=== Solo exhibitions ===
- 1975, "The Jerusalem Triptych", audio-visual multi-screen slide show, at the Israel Museum
- 1997, at the Open Museum of Photography at Tel Hai Industrial Park and at the Nuremberg City Hall, Germany
- 2005-2006, Eretz Israel Museum, Tel Aviv
- 2007, foyer of the Van Leer Institute, exhibition accompanying Braun's Lifetime Achievement Award (see #Awards)
- 2026, "Werner Braun: Between Water and Sky", Eretz Israel Museum

=== Group exhibitions ===
- 1990, "40 Years of Photojournalism in Israel" exhibition, Neil Folberg Gallery, San Francisco
- 2000, "Time Frame - One Hundred Years of Photography in Palestine" at the Israel Museum; "Photography in Palestine-Israel in the Thirties and Forties" at the Herzliya Museum; and "Hod and Hadar" at the Eretz Israel Museum, all part of the End of the Century exhibition series
- 2006, "Between the Boundaries of Space and the Boundaries of Place - A Photographic Discourse on the Landscape of the Land", Tel Hai Open Museum of Photography
- 2009, "Song of the Lake - A Photographic History of Lake Hula 1900-2009", Uri and Rami House, Ashdot Yaakov
- 2010, "The Old Man - David Ben-Gurion and His Legacy in the Mirror of Art in Israel", Ben-Gurion University
- 2014, "In Bat Ayin", Photography Gallery, Musrara School of Photography, Jerusalem.

== Archive ==
Werner Braun left an archive of some 300,000 selected negatives and black-and-white and color contacts. These were planned to be digitised, starting in 2023, at the Yad Ben Zvi Institute.

== Foundation ==
The Werner and Anat Braun Heritage Foundation, officially the Foundation for the Commemoration of the Legacy of Photographers Werner and Anat Braun, i.e., his wife, Anat Rotem-Braun (1947-2019), established in 2023, is administering the Braun Photography Fund (Hebrew-only homepage at braunfund.org)

== Gallery ==
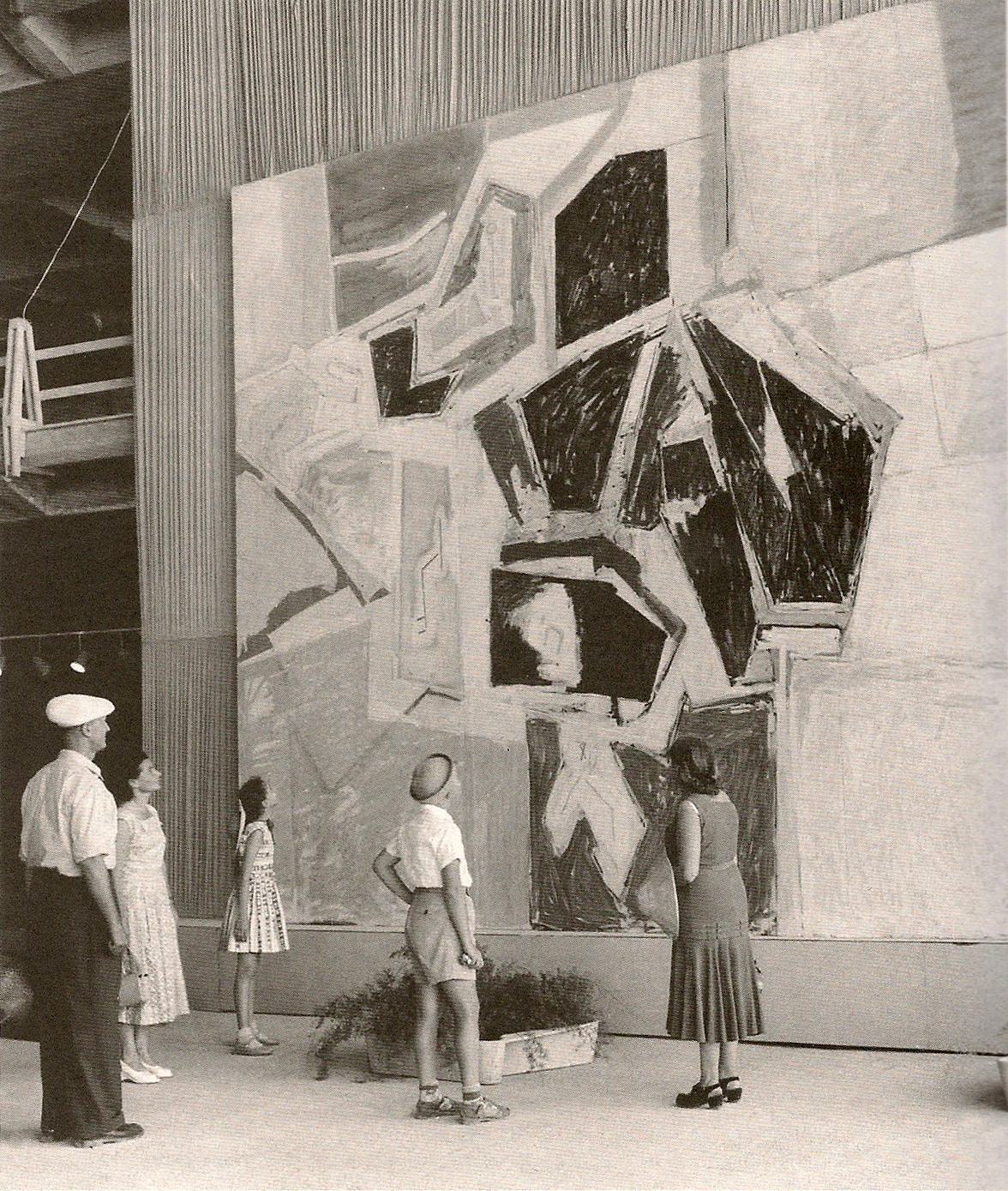

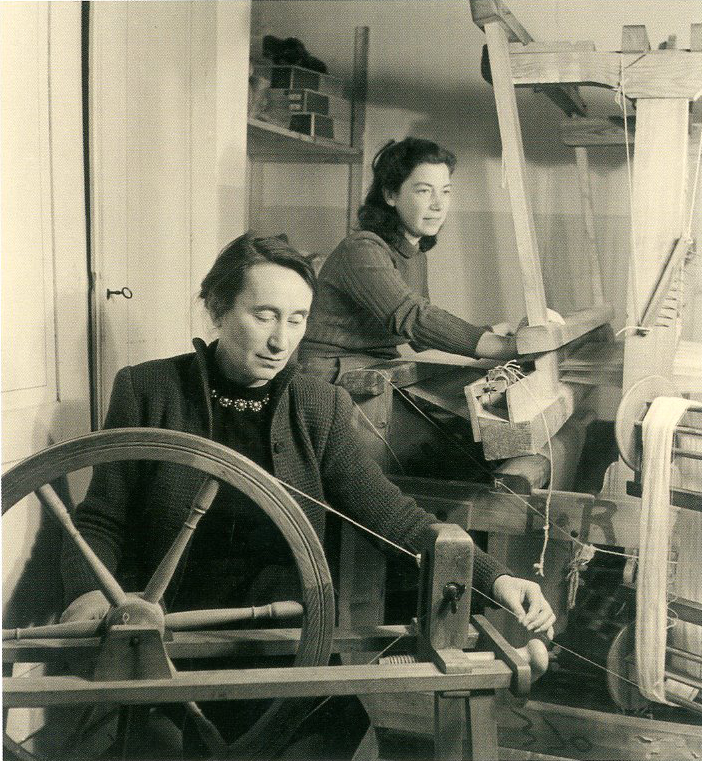

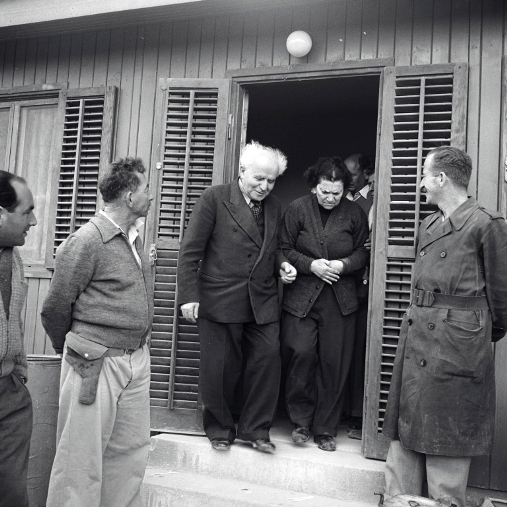

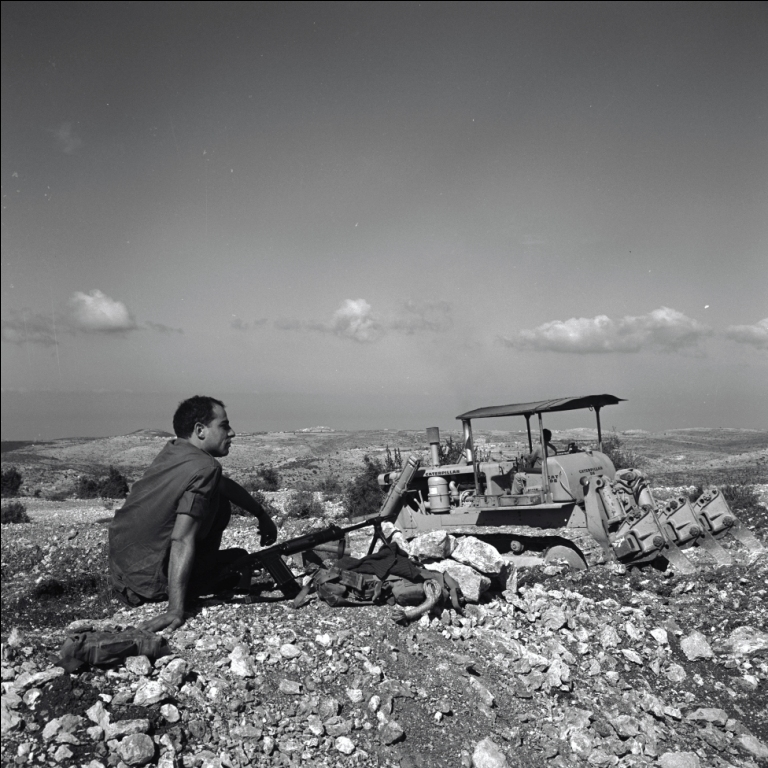

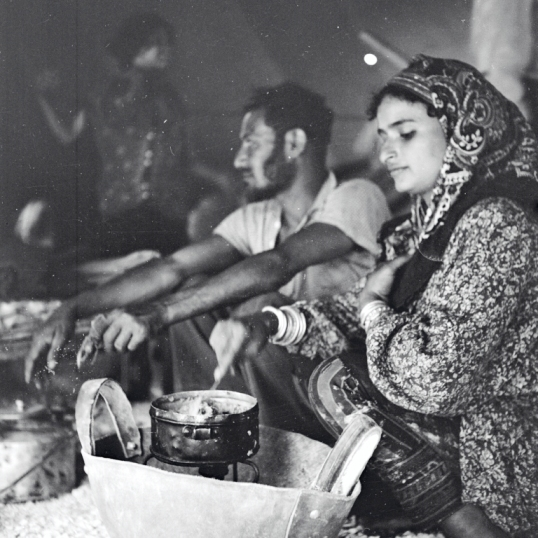

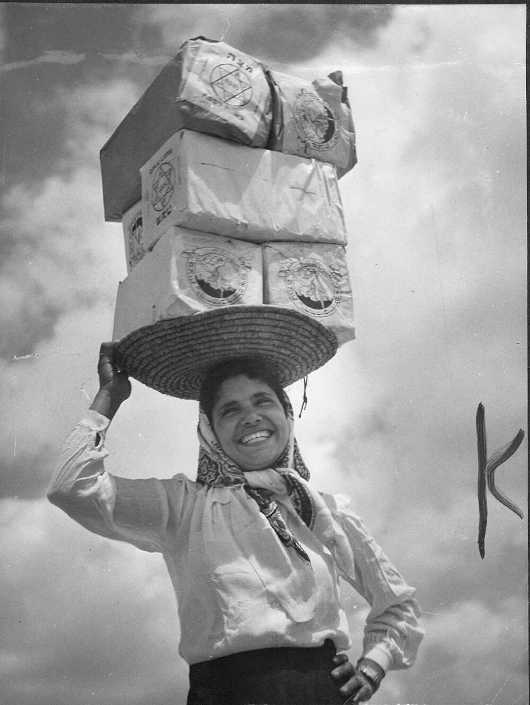

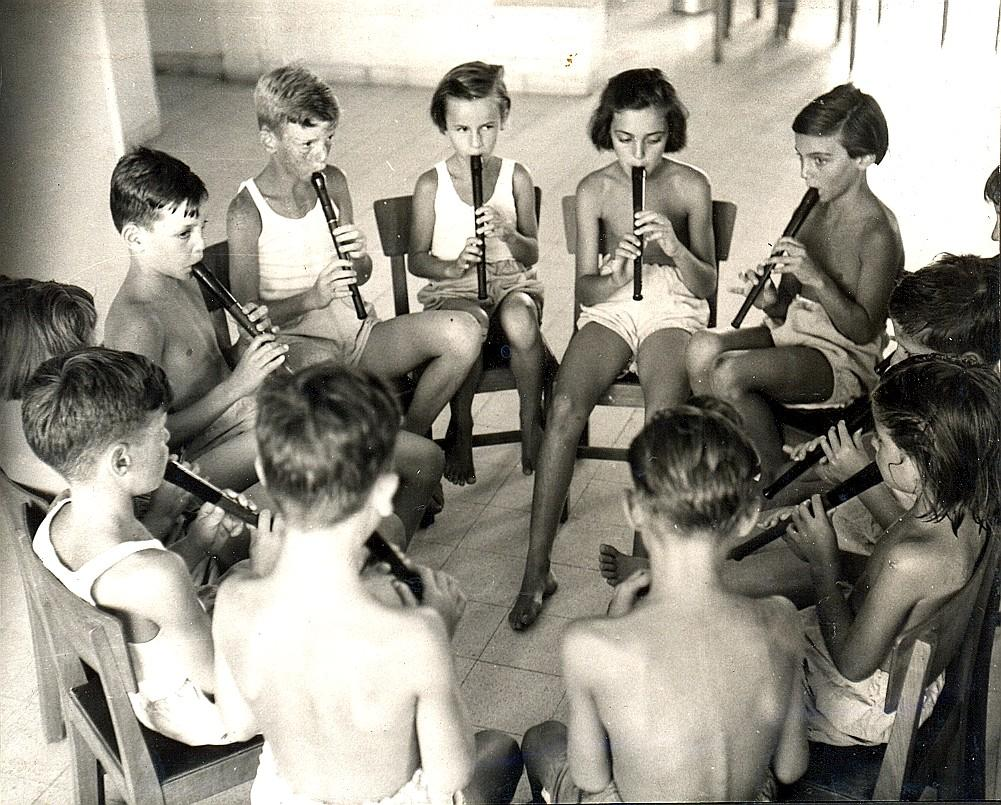

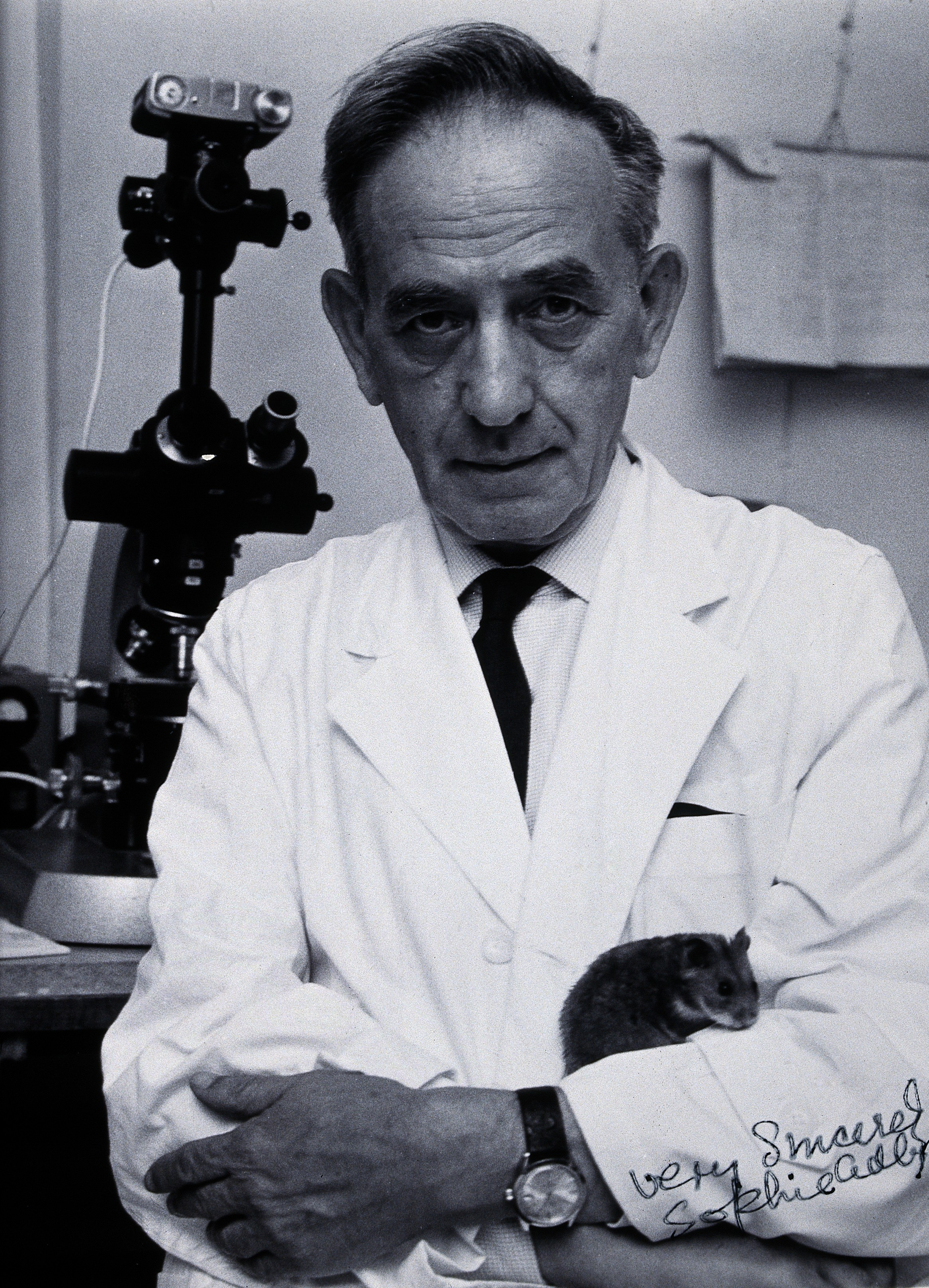

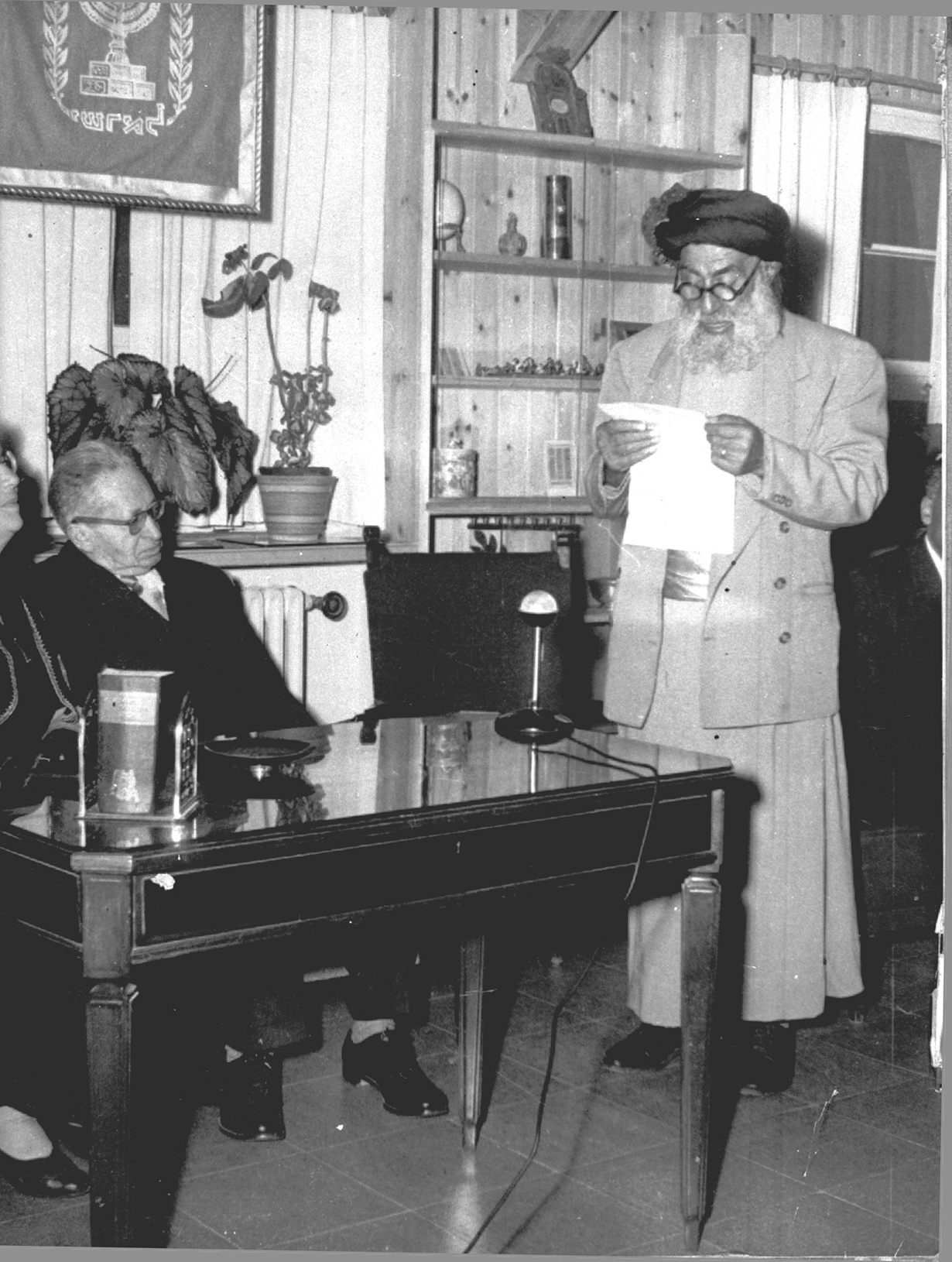

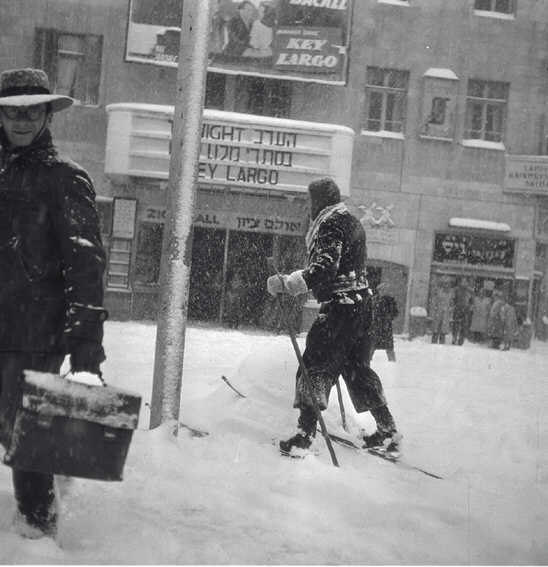

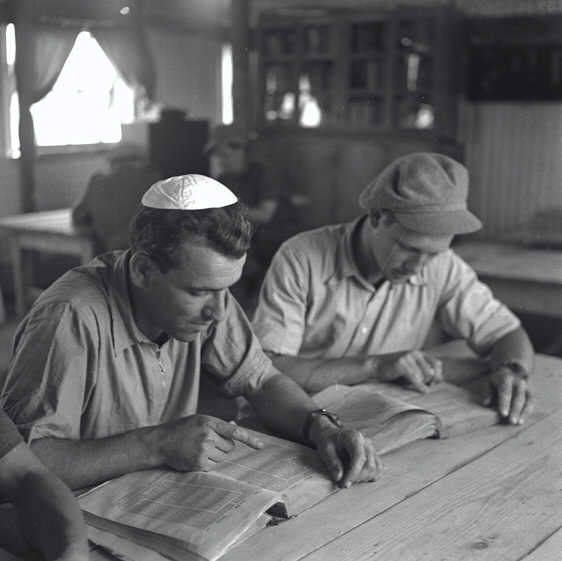

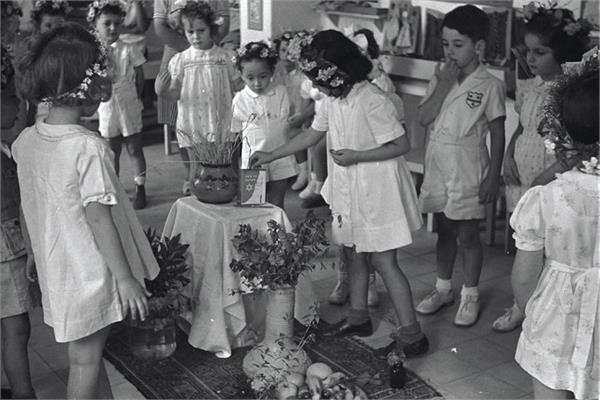
