= 1111 Lincoln Road =

Parking garage in Miami Beach, Florida

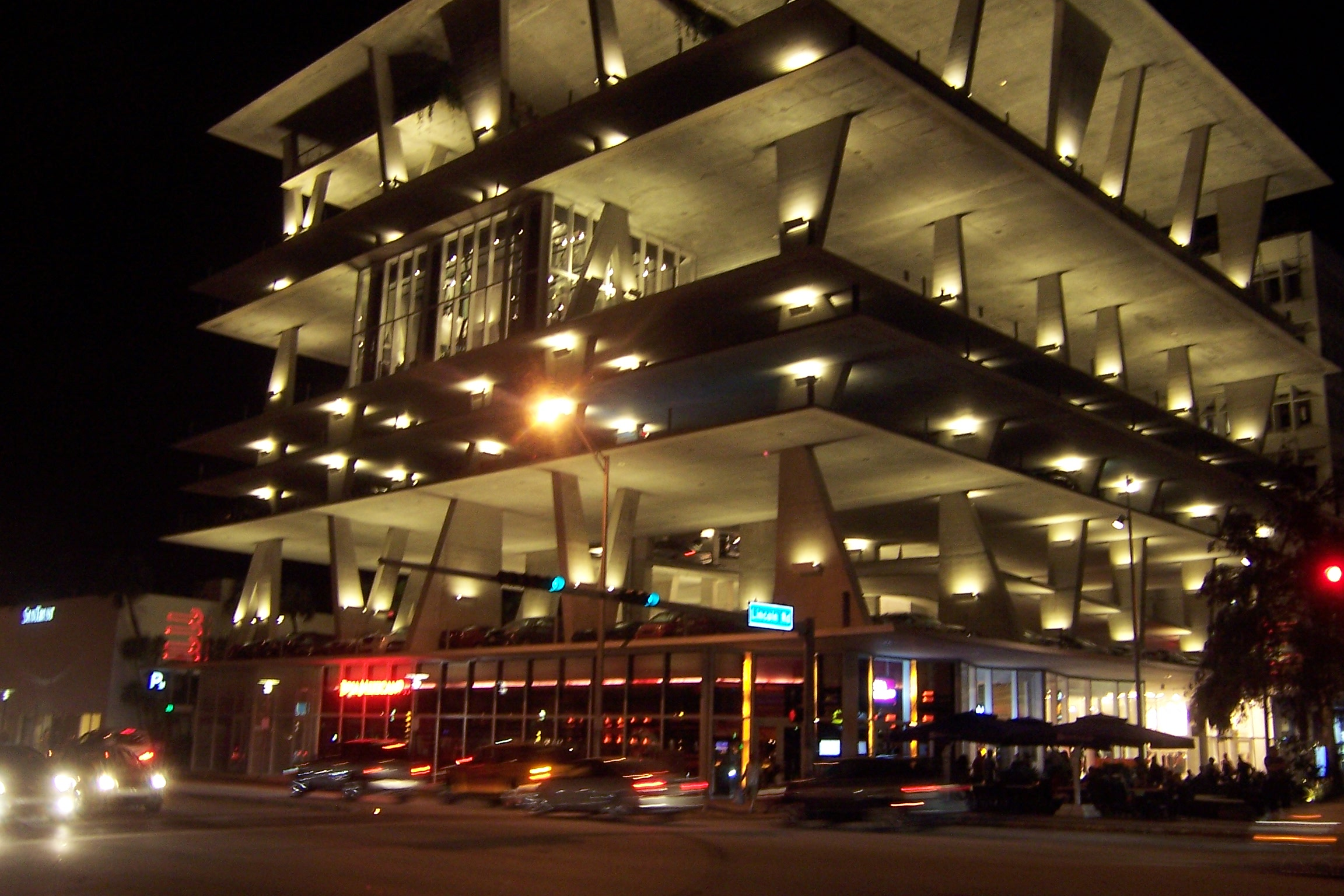

- Location within Florida

General information
- Type: Parking garage
- Location: 1111 Lincoln Road, Miami Beach, Florida, U.S.
- Coordinates: 25.791°N 80.141°W
- Construction started: 2008
- Opening: 2010
- Cost: $65 million
- Landlord: UIA Management LLC

Technical details
- Floor count: 7

Design and construction
- Architect: Herzog & de Meuron
- Developer: Robert Wennett
- Main contractor: G.T. McDonald

Other information
- Parking: 300 automobiles

Website
- 1111lincolnrd.com

1111 Lincoln Road is a parking garage in the South Beach section of Miami Beach, Florida, designed by the internationally known Swiss architectural firm of Herzog & de Meuron. It is located at the western end of the Lincoln Road Mall at the intersection with Alton Road, and can house some 300 cars. Since its opening in 2010, it has attracted considerable interest because its unique appearance is different from more traditional parking garage designs.

== Background ==
In 2005, local developer Robert Wennett bought a SunTrust Bank office structure that was from 1968 and the Brutalist style. This included an adjacent surface parking lot. Intent upon revitalizing the western end of Lincoln Road Mall, Wennett decided not to eliminate the existing structure, but instead build something next to it of equal height – a parking garage.

As Architectural Record has noted, "In the Pantheon of Building Types, the parking garage lurks somewhere in the vicinity of prisons and toll plazas." The New York Times has labeled parking garages "the grim afterthought of American design". But Wennett was determined to do something different, and interviewed ten well-known architects around the globe before choosing Herzog & de Meuron. Construction began in 2008 and entailed closing the western end of Lincoln Road Mall.

The resulting structure cost $65 million to build. The overall project included renovation of the existing building into one used for storefronts and offices for creative firms, and construction of a new, smaller structure for SunTrust that also contained a few apartments.

== Design and use ==
The design, led by Herzog & de Meuron partner Christine Binswanger, has been characterized as resembling a house of cards. It is an open-air structure with no exterior walls constructed around buttresses and cantilevers that features floor heights varying from 8 to 34 feet. Some of the internal ramps are quite steep in order to accommodate the wider height intervals. Elevators and a central, winding staircase take drivers to and from their cars. A glassed-in high-fashion boutique, Alchemist, sits on an edge of the fifth floor. The parking garage features retail space at the street level, with tenants such as Taschen books, Osklen clothing, Nespresso coffee and MAC cosmetics and is joined to the other structures that were part of the project. Wennett built a penthouse apartment for himself as part of a 18,000-square-foot (1,700 m^{2}) space on the structure's roof that also features a pool and gardens with hanging vines. Jacques Herzog of the firm called the parking garage the most radical work they had ever done.

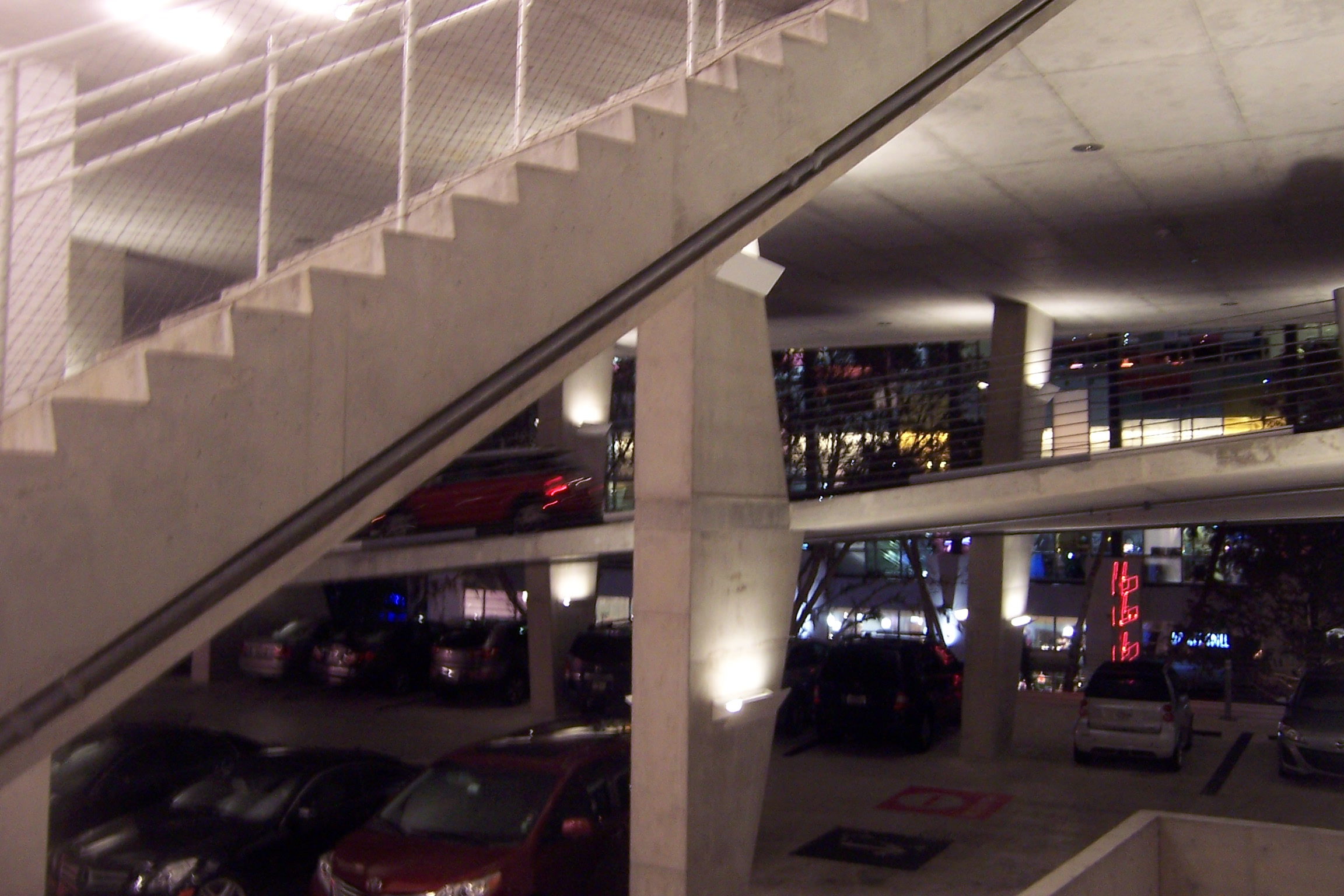
A car descends between the third and second floors of the garage, as seen from the central staircase. Part of the red neon "1111" sign that faces Lincoln Road Mall can be seen as well.

The garage has become a destination for architects and photographers interested in its design. It has achieved renown as a tourist attraction as well, especially after it was featured on the front page of The New York Times in January 2011. Several hundred people a day walk into the garage to look around. Runners use it for exercise. Those parking their cars often linger for the panoramic views it provides of the South Beach area, before going on their way (although acrophobics likely stay away from the edges). One loyal customer refuses to park anywhere else and was quoted as saying, "It's a work of art more than a garage. Everywhere you look, there's a view."

The seventh floor doubles as an event space. The garage has drawn requests for many types of events to be held there, including wine tastings, dinner parties, and yoga classes. It has been a site for weddings, and one woman had a drawing of the garage on her invitations. It has also been the scene of celebrity-filled parties, such as one Ferrari gave during Art Basel Miami Beach week (where two dozen of the maker's automobiles ran up and down the garage's ramps). At Art Basel 2011, German automaker BMW unveiled both its i3 and i8 electric prototype concept cars on the parking structure's seventh floor. A television commercial for the Lexus IS 250 was filmed there.

== Reception ==
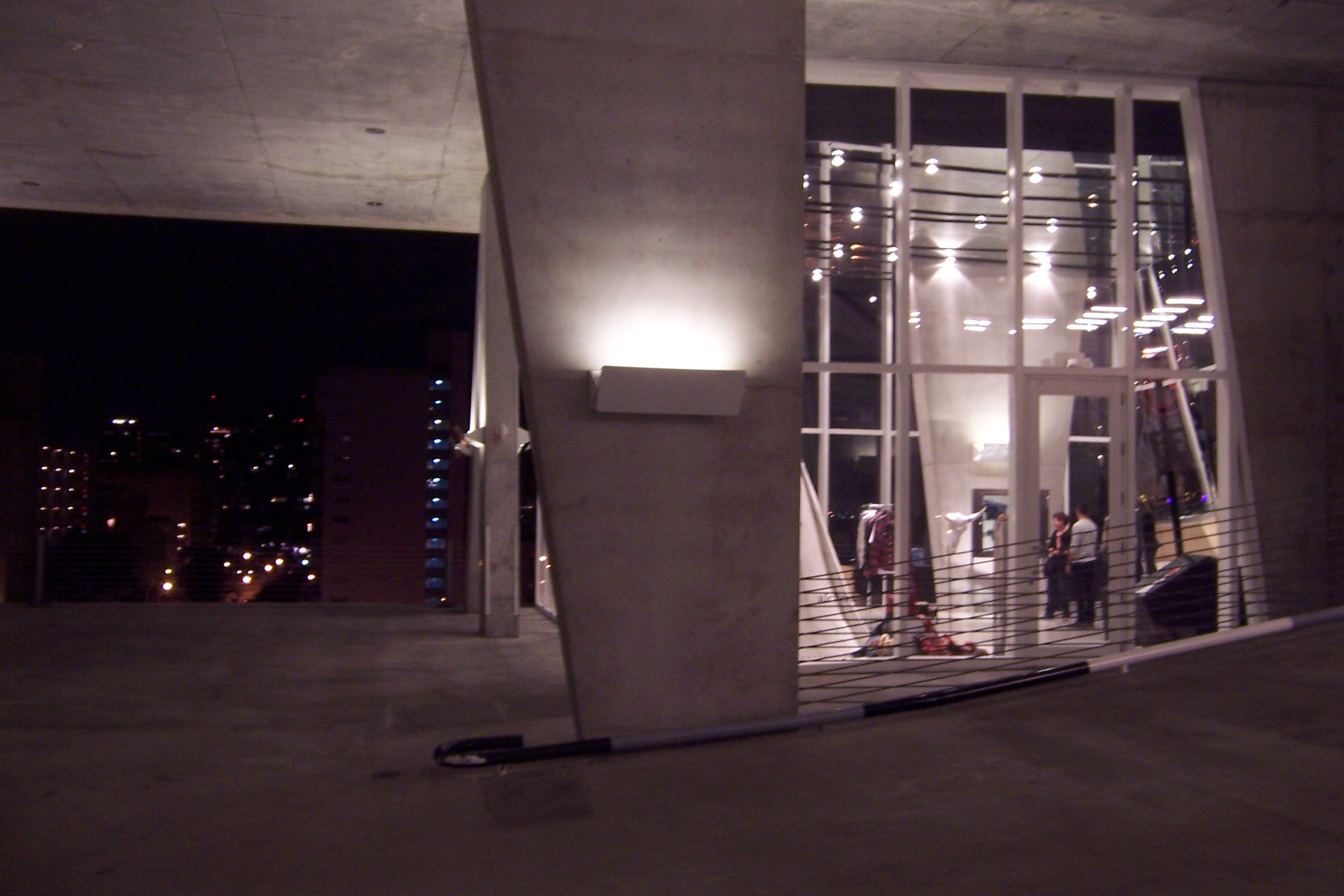
A glass-enclosed fashion boutique sits at the edge of the fifth floor of the garage.

Since its opening, 1111 Lincoln Road has received varied reviews. The director of Miami Beach's Wolfsonian Museum said that the structure "sets a new bar for what parking garages could and should be." Architectural Record wrote that the designers managed to successfully relate the structure to the nearby surroundings, but more importantly, "are helping break the mold for the lowly parking garage, lifting it up out of its gloomy limbo into the light and air." The Los Angeles Times referred to it as "stunning", and the Associated Press wrote that it "has become a modern gateway to the see-and-be-seen cafe scene of Miami Beach's Lincoln Road."

Some users have objected to the high price for parking at 1111 Lincoln Road, which can be up to four times greater than at other lots in the area. (Conversely, drivers of luxury cars like parking at 1111 to emphasize their status.) Others have complained that the garage is not sufficiently protected against South Florida's rainstorms. University of Miami film professor Lisa Gottlieb said that appreciation for the garage reflected poorly on Miami Beach: "It says something about the aesthetic down here. I guess this is what we bring to the table – a fancy parking garage." The "starchitect" phenomenon was reaching the Miami area, with Frank Gehry's nearby New World Center following in 2011 and Herzog & de Meuron's new Miami Art Museum in the works as well. Given the success of the 1111 structure, owners of other new parking garages in South Beach have tried to add design elements to their properties. In 2012, the American Institute of Architects's Florida Chapter placed 1111 Lincoln Road on its list Florida Architecture: 100 Years. 100 Places.
