= Lincoln Road =

- Lincoln Road Mall
- U.S. National Register of Historic Places
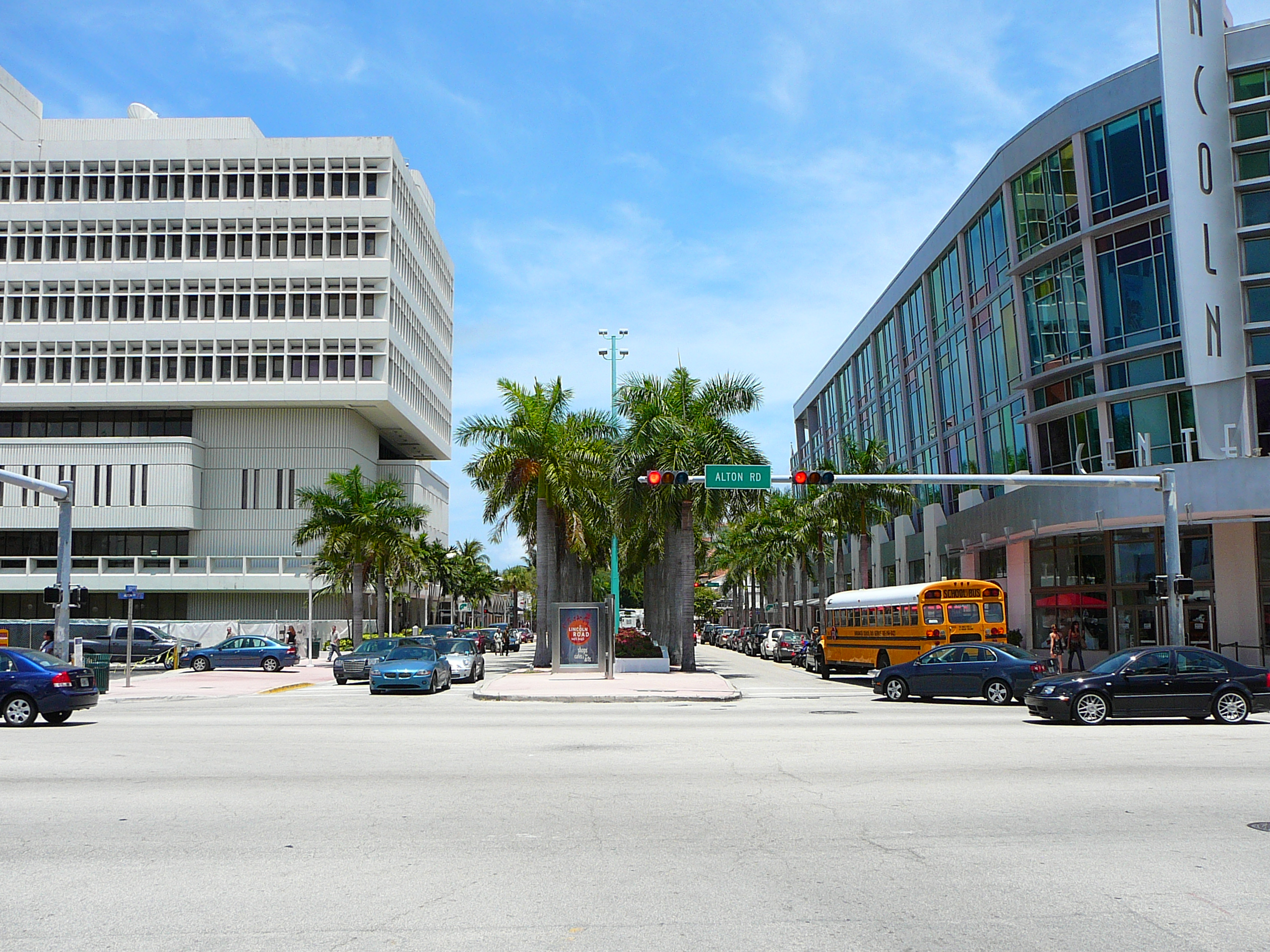
- Lincoln Road as it looked in 2008 facing east at the intersection of Alton Road. The Regal Cinema is on the right.

- Location within Florida
- Location: Miami Beach, Florida
- Coordinates: 25°47′26″N 80°8′11″W
- Built: November 28, 1960; 65 years ago (grand opening)
- Architect: Morris Lapidus
- NRHP reference No.: 11000287

Lincoln Road is a street in Miami Beach, Florida, United States. The most famous section is Lincoln Road Mall, a pedestrian road running east–west parallel between 16th Street and 17th Street. Once completely open to vehicular traffic, the pedestrian mall is replete with shops, restaurants, galleries, and other businesses between Washington Avenue with a traffic accessible street extending east to the Atlantic Ocean and west to Alton Road with a traffic accessible street extending to Biscayne Bay.

== History ==
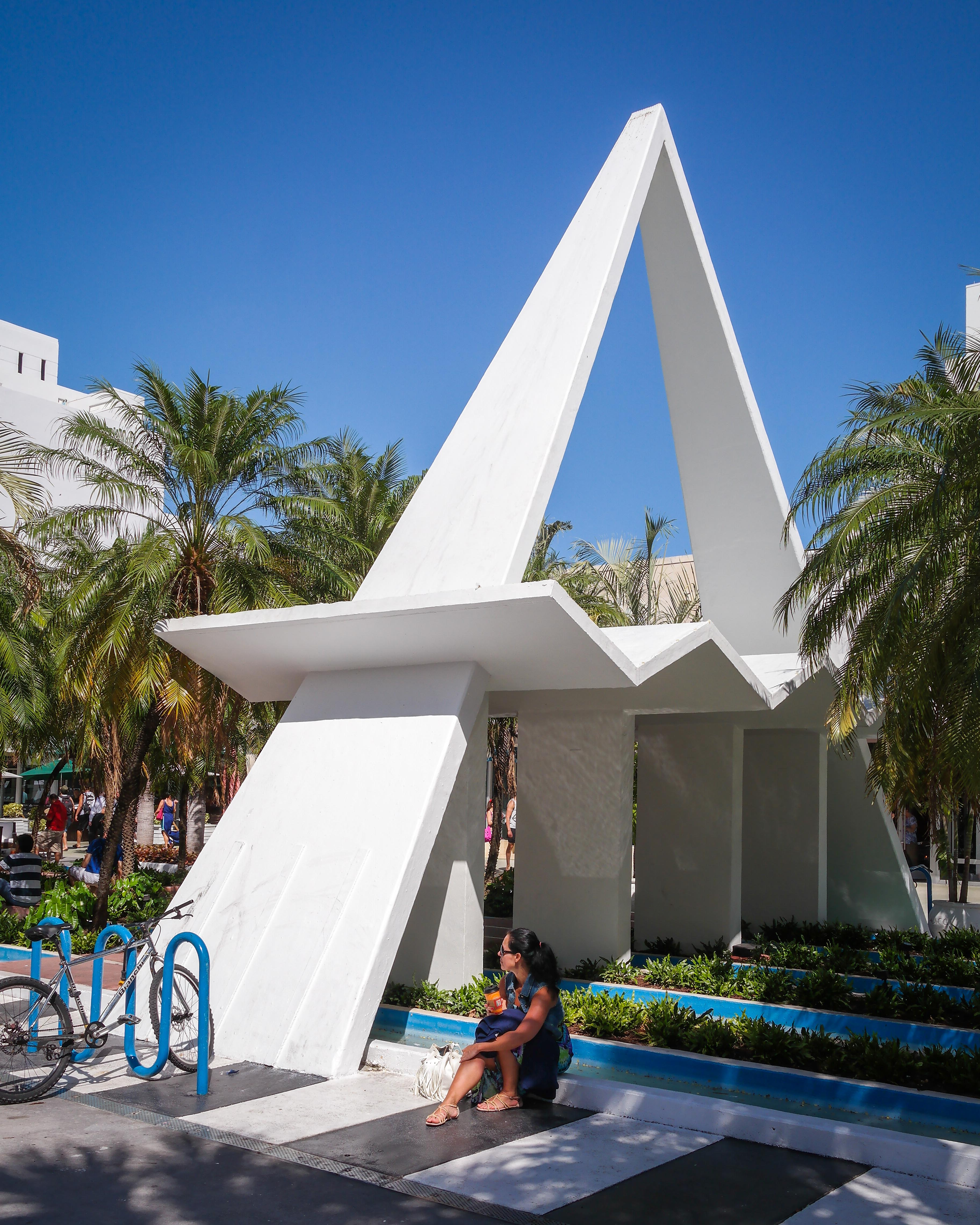
Miami Modern architecture follies line Lincoln Road

Originally, Lincoln Road was a forest of mangroves, as was most of Miami Beach. In 1912, Carl Fisher cleared a strip of the mangroves from the Atlantic (east) side of the island to the Biscayne Bay (west) side of the island and it eventually became the town's social center. Fisher maintained a real estate office on Lincoln Road. Over time Lincoln Road featured premium retail destinations like Bonwit Teller, Saks Fifth Avenue, and even Cadillac and Packard car dealerships.

In the 1950s Miami Beach architect Morris Lapidus, whose credits include Miami Beach's Fountainebleau and Eden Roc hotels, was commissioned to redesign Lincoln Road. Lapidus' design for Lincoln Road, complete with gardens, fountains, shelters and an amphitheater, reflected the Miami Modern Architecture, or "MiMo", style that Lapidus pioneered in the 1950s. The road was closed to vehicular traffic and became one of the nation's early pedestrian malls and had its grand opening November 28, 1960. It billed itself as the "most magnificent mall in all of the Americas".

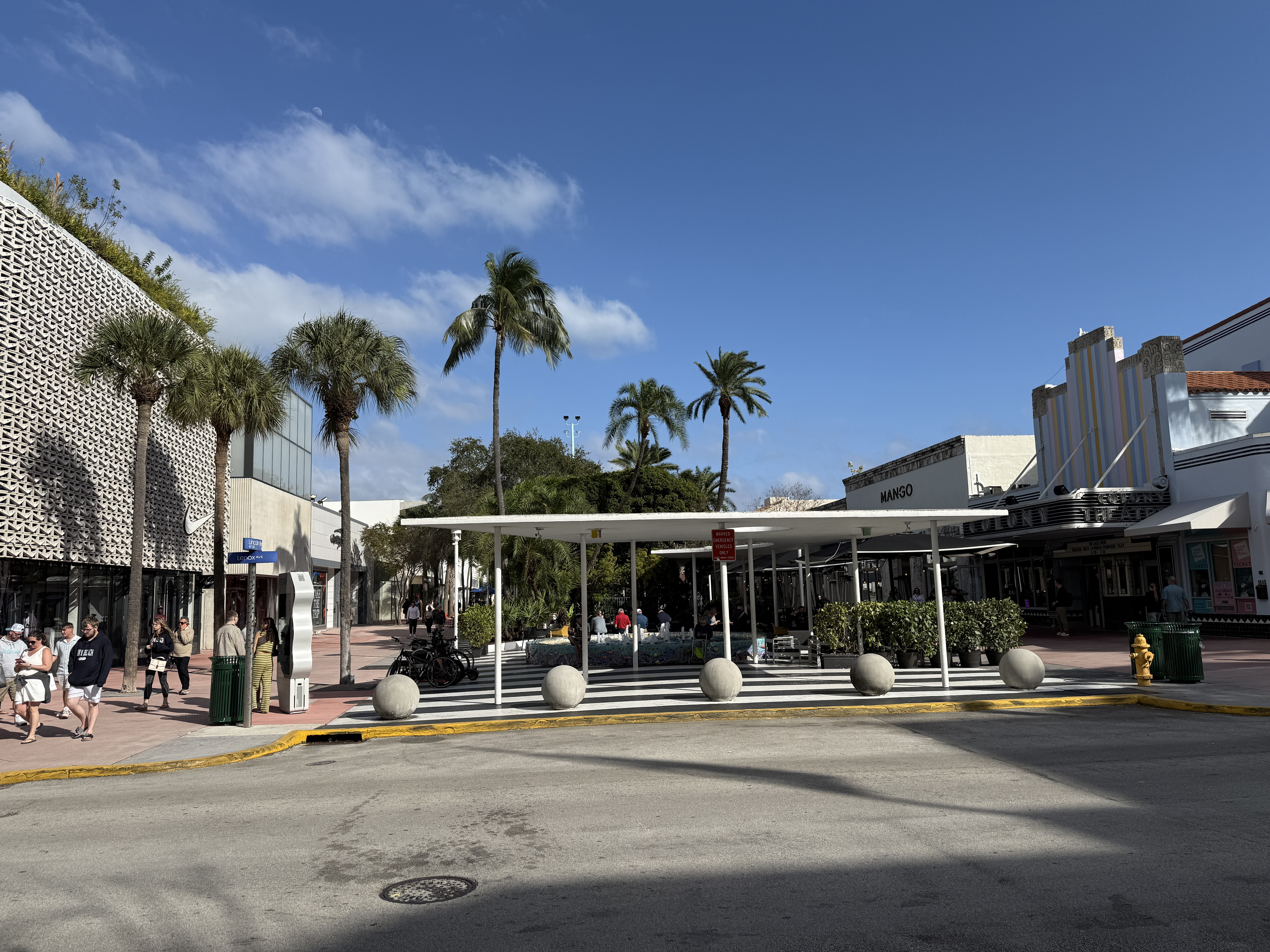
Lincoln Road Mall looking east at Lenox Avenue

Today Lincoln Road features a state-of-the-art multiplex cinema, the architecturally acclaimed 1111 Lincoln Road parking garage, the acclaimed New World Center concert hall, the offices of Viacom Latin America, as well as over 200 boutiques, local merchants, national retail stores, and fine restaurants and bars. Lincoln Road is also home to the newly restored Colony Theatre, a performing arts venue, and ArtCenter/South Florida, a collection of studios and gallery spaces for artists. Street performers entertain a constant stream of tourists and locals on Lincoln Road. It is among the most popular destinations for visitors to the South Beach area.

In 2006, the Miami Beach Preservation Board approved the closure of traffic of the west end of Lincoln mall for the purpose of extending the popular pedestrian mall west to Alton Road. In 2010, Raymond Jungles designed this additional block. Jungles' created an “urban oasis” by using eye-catching materials and biofiltration plants.

In 2011, the FIU School of Architecture opened a sister campus to its main campus at University Park, on Lincoln Road, with classroom spaces for FIU architecture, art, music and theater graduate students.

On May 6, 2011, by recommendation of DOCOMOMO (Documentation and Conservation of the Modern Movement) led by architect Allan T. Shulman the thoroughfare was added to the National Register of Historic Places as Lincoln Road Mall.

== Gallery ==
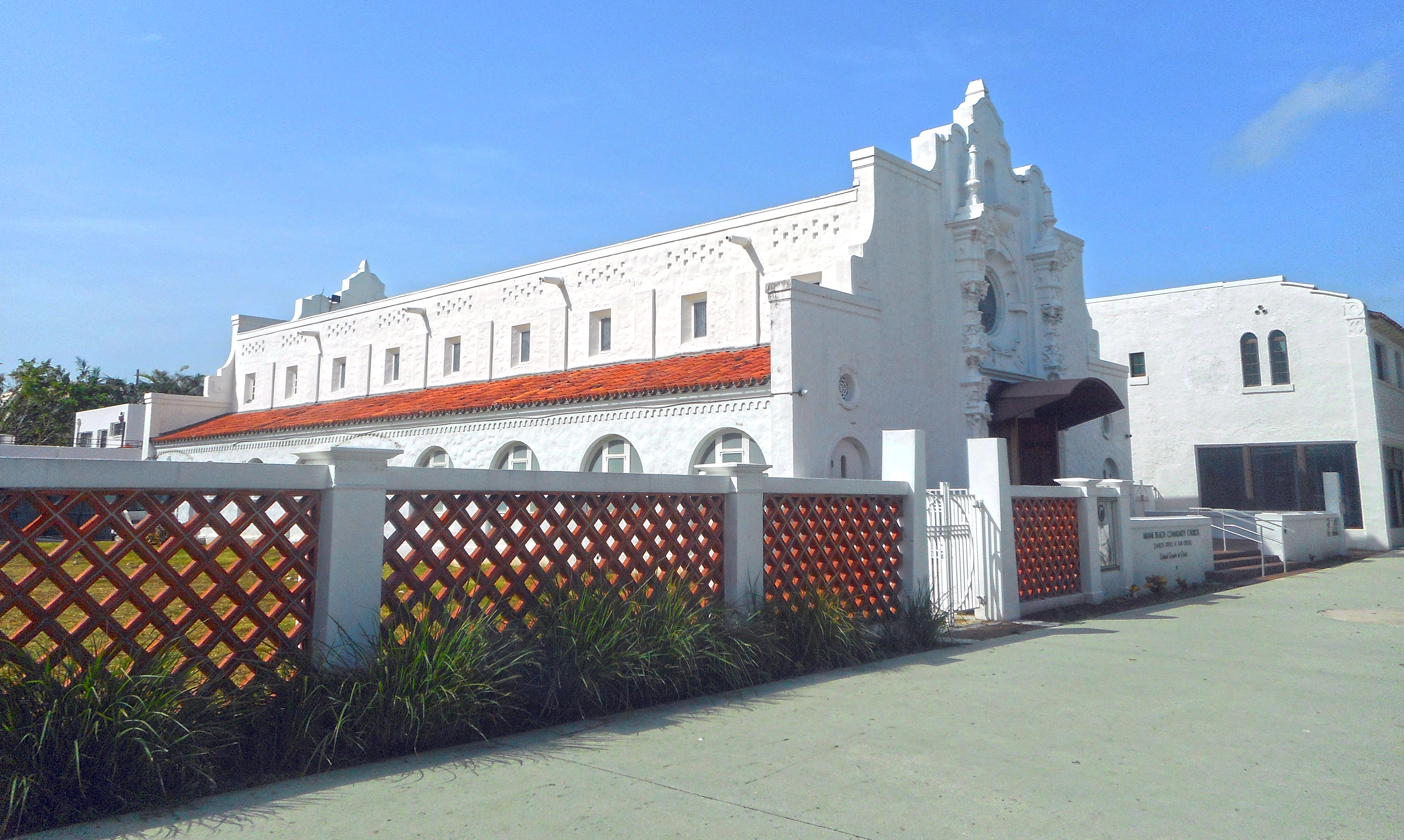
Miami Beach Community Church, designed by Walter De Garmo

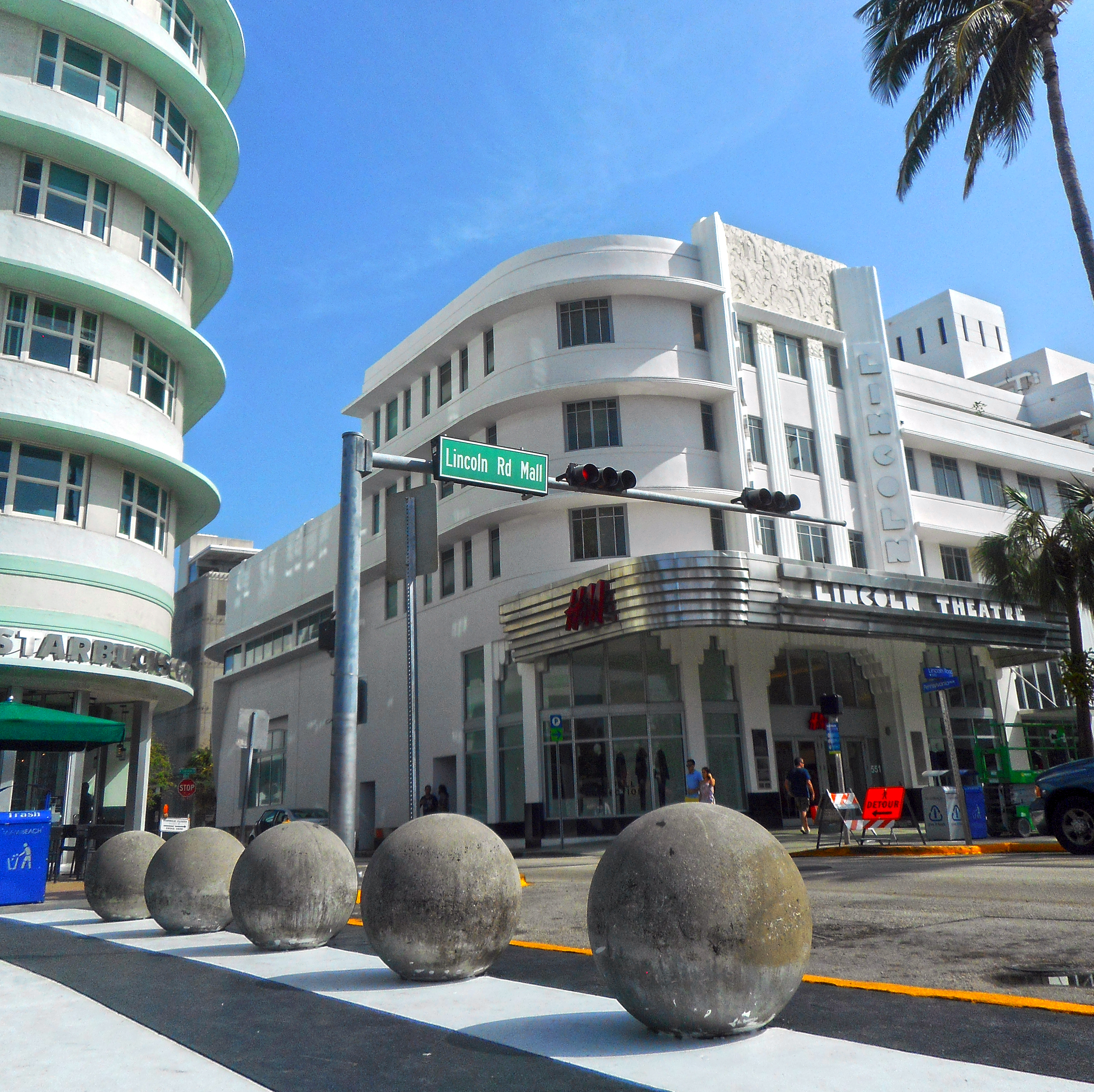
Lincoln Theatre, across from the Lincoln Road Mall

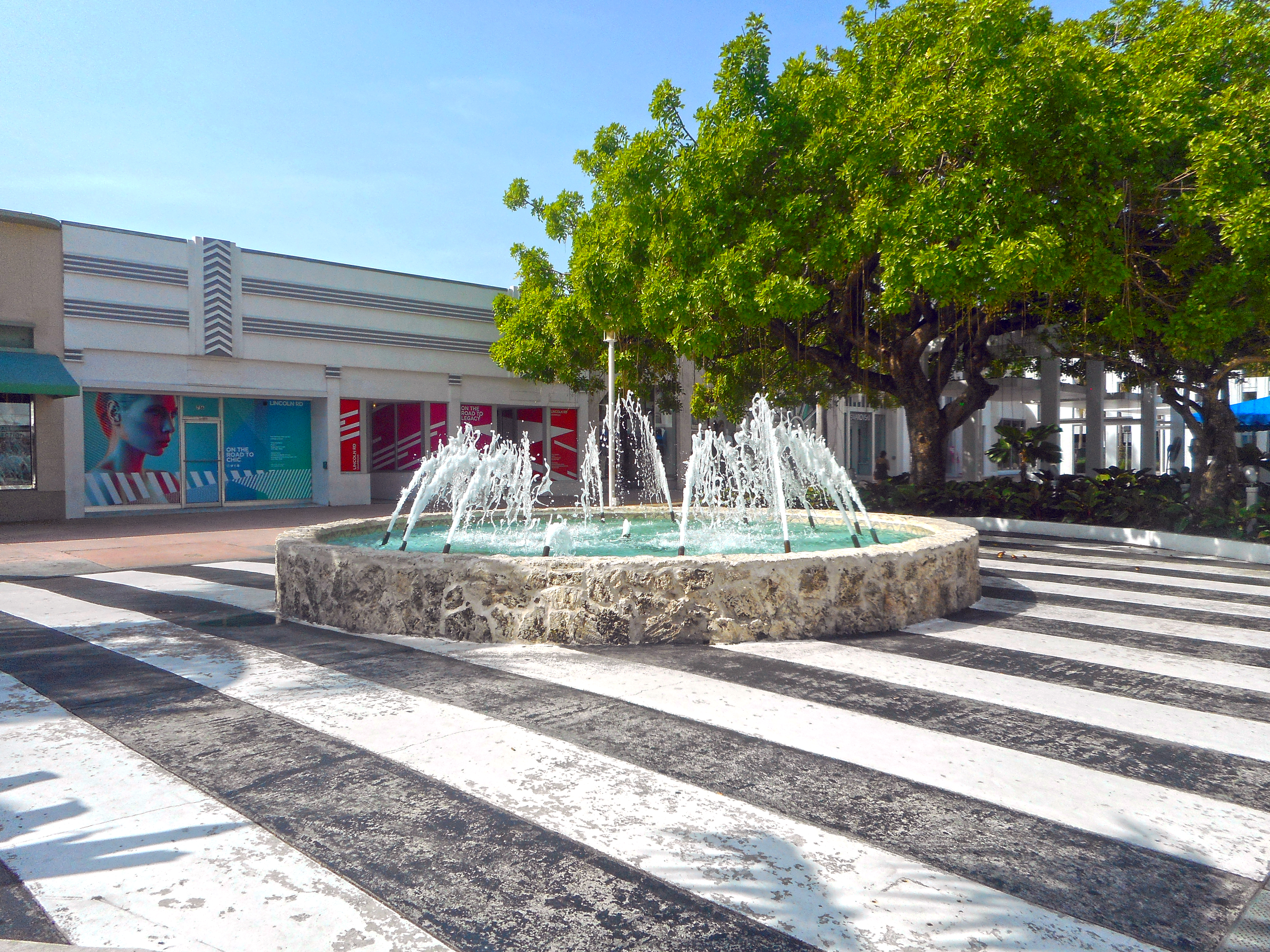

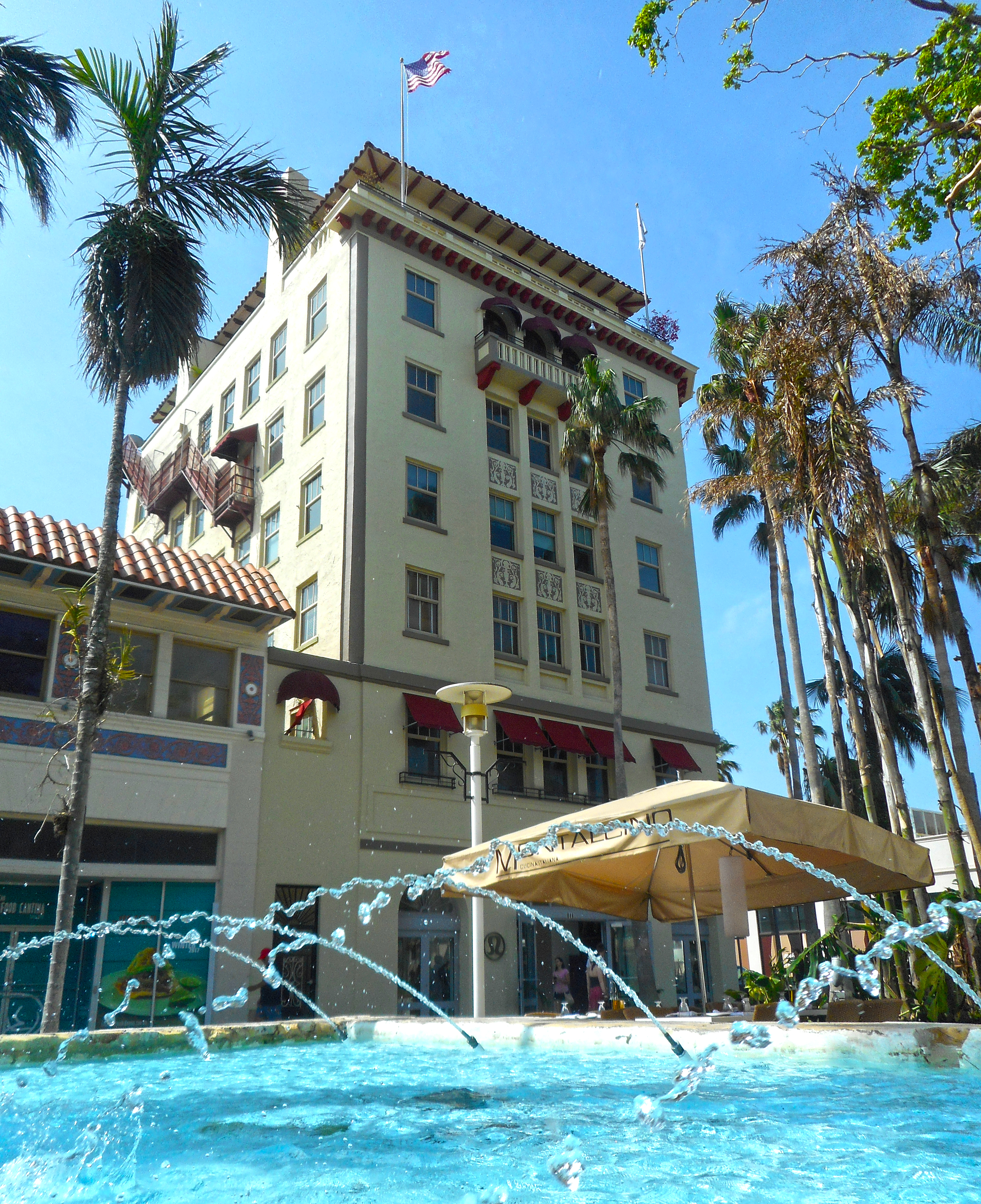

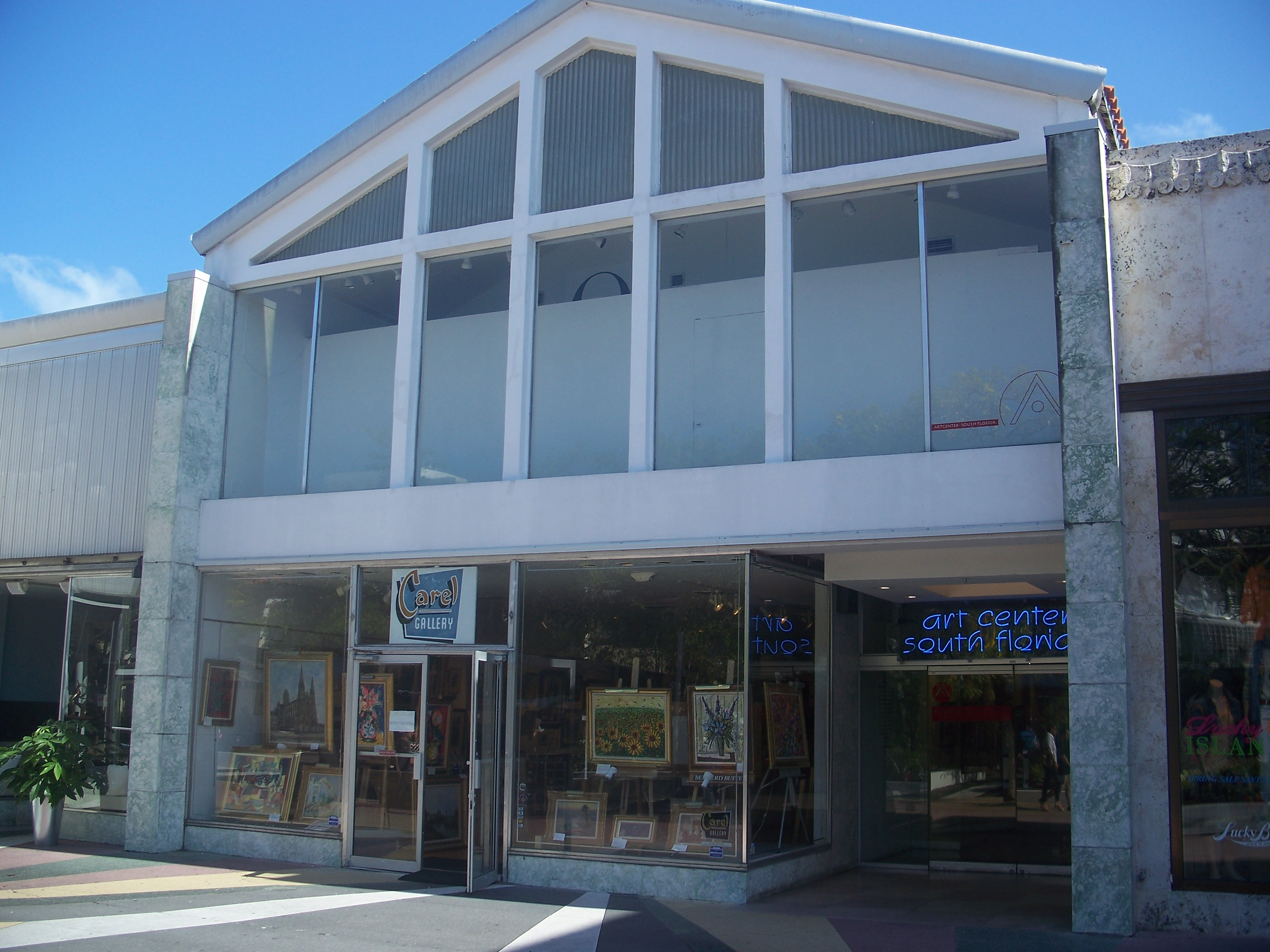
ArtCenter/South Florida

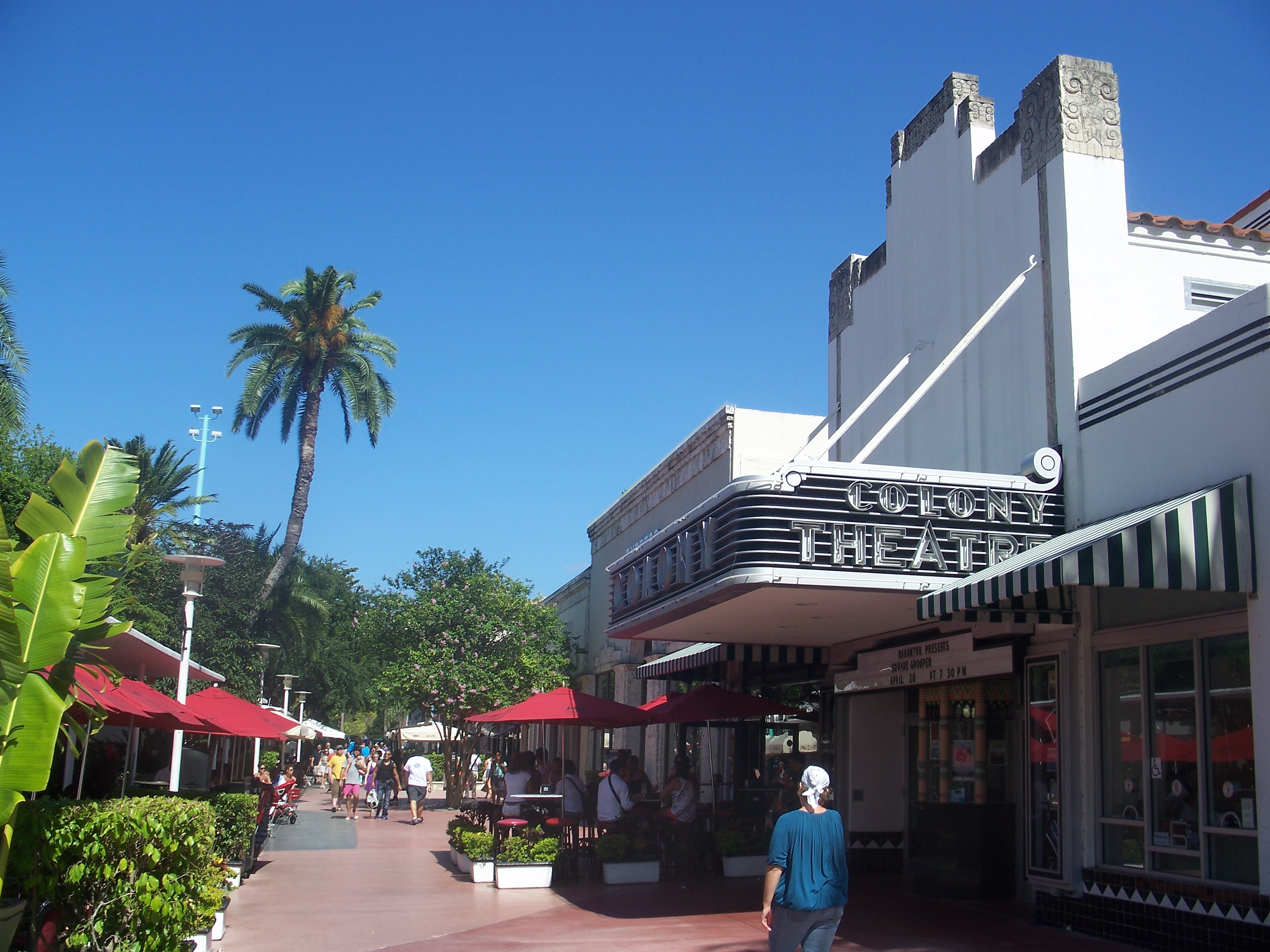
Colony Theatre

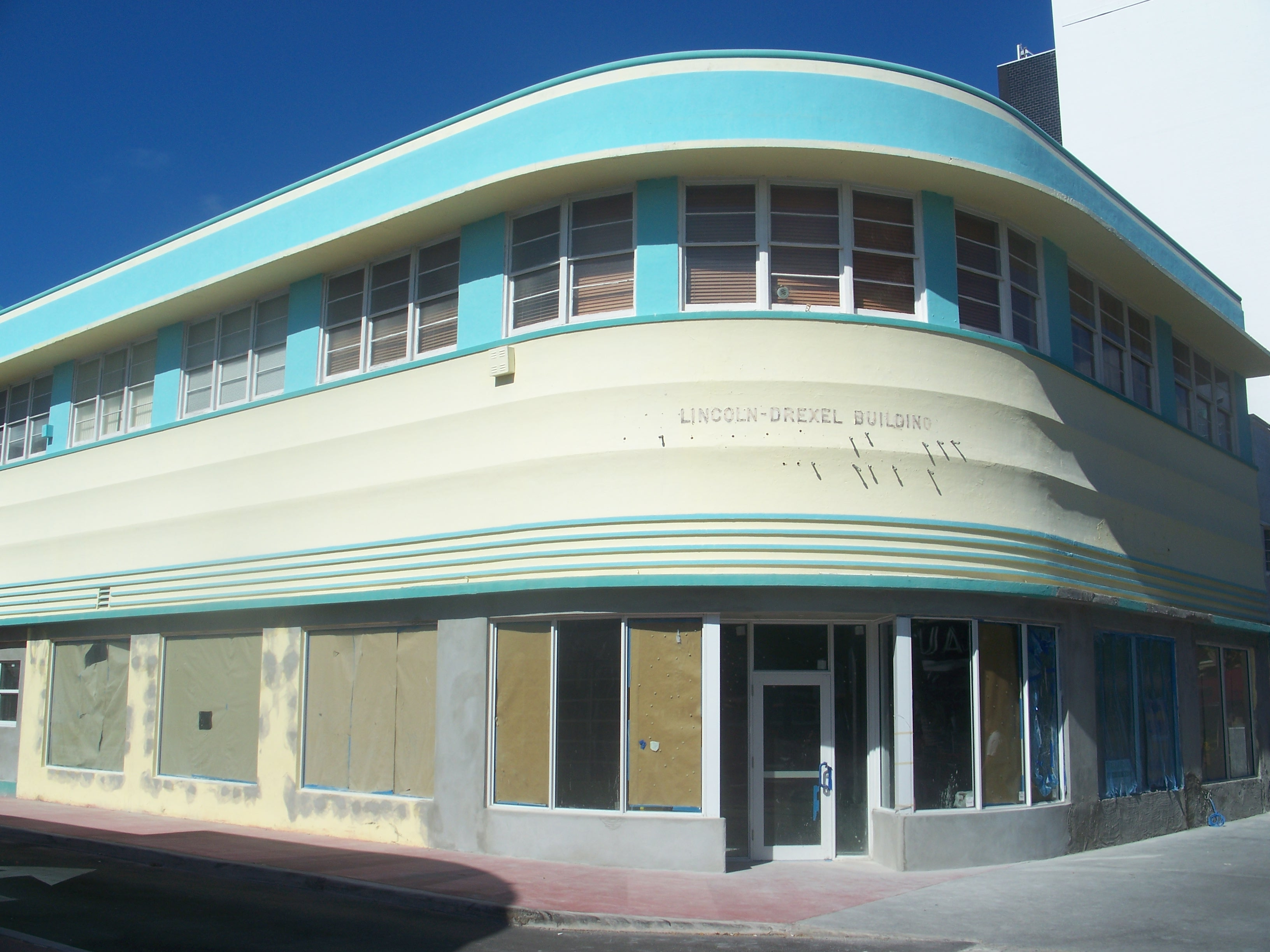
Lincoln-Drexel Building

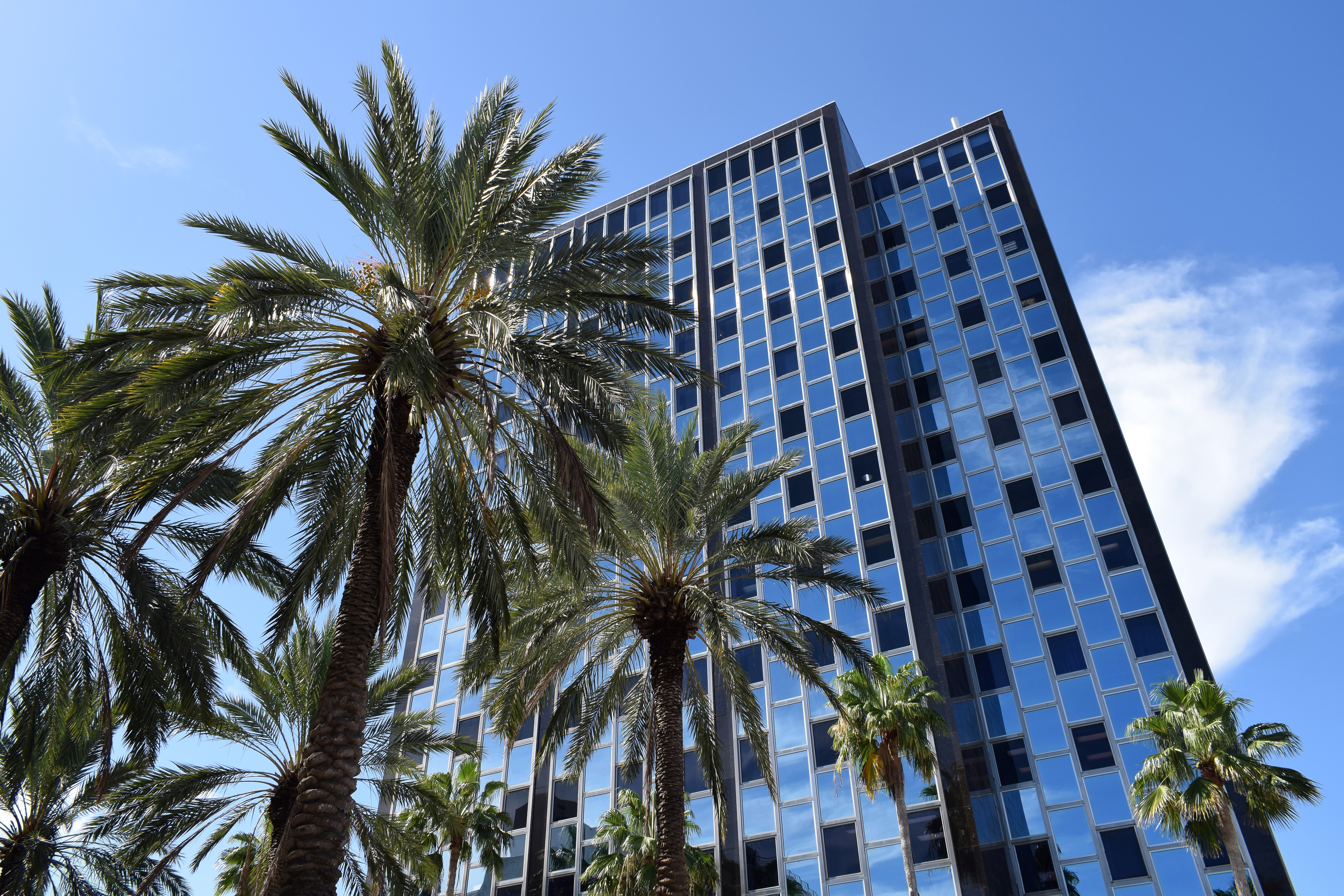
Miami Beach Federal Building, designed by Edwin T. Reeder

== See also ==
- Miami Beach
- South Beach
- Collins Avenue
