= New World Center =

Concert hall in Miami Beach, Florida, U.S.

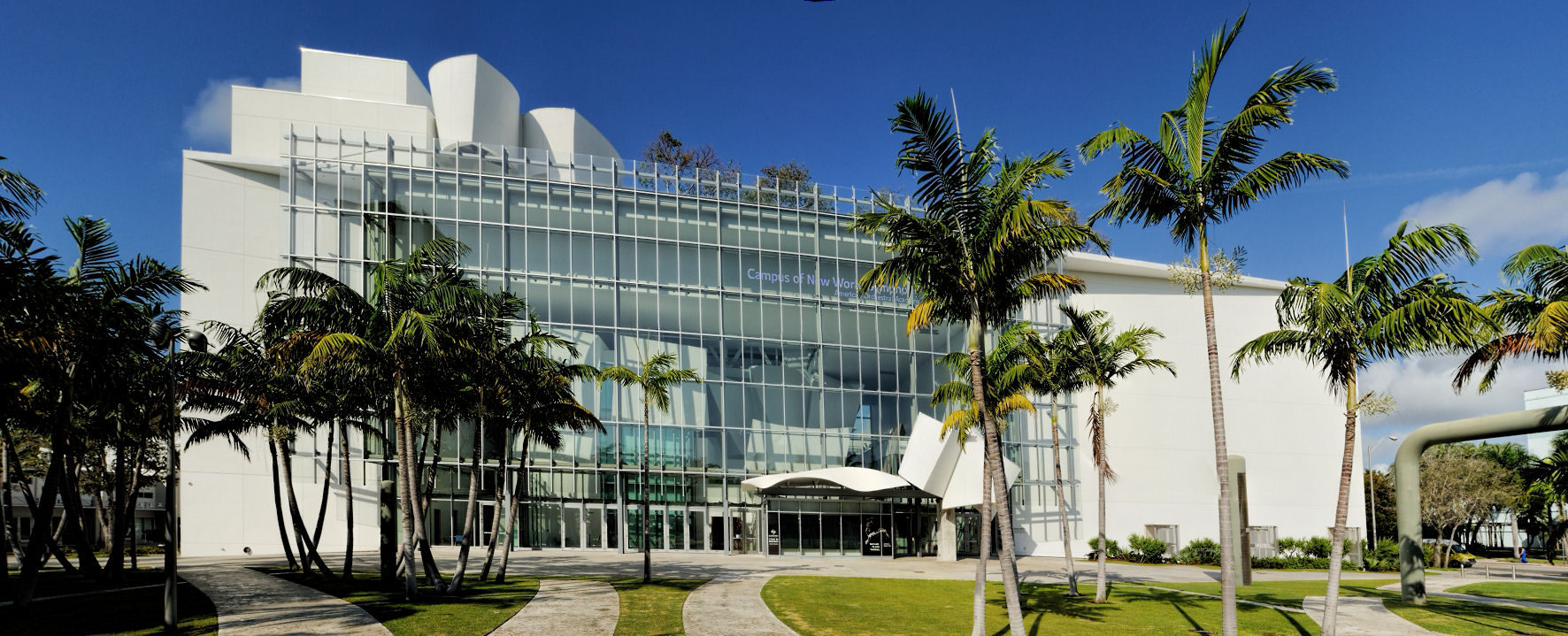
- The New World Center and the adjacent public park
- Interactive map of New World Center
- Location: 500 17th Street; Miami Beach, Florida, U.S.
- Coordinates: 25.792°N 80.133°W
- Seating type: Reserved
- Capacity: 756
- Type: Concert hall

Construction
- Built: 2008–2011
- Opened: January 26, 2011
- Cost: $160 million
- Architect: Frank Gehry

Website
- www.newworldcenter.com

The New World Center is a concert hall in the South Beach section of Miami Beach, Florida, designed by Frank Gehry. It is the home of the New World Symphony, with a capacity of 756 seats. It opened in January 2011.

Located one block north of Lincoln Road in the South Beach stretch of Miami Beach, the building also features a new 2.5-acre public park next to it, designed by the firm West 8 (after Gehry relinquished the job following a budget reduction). A half acre of that is the SoundScape area, which allows outside visitors to experience live, free "wallcasts" of select events throughout the season through the use of visual and audio technology on a 7,000-square-foot (650 m^{2}) projection wall. Such wallcasts are planned to occur at least twice a month. A sound system incorporating 155 individually tuned speakers augments the high-definition video presentation. During performances, QR codes are shown to enable the outside audience to scan them and obtain more information about the work in question. In addition to live broadcasts of events inside, works in the video arts themselves can be shown on the wall, including those produced during the Art Basel Miami Beach event. The projection wall is said to be the largest permanently established projection surface in North America.

Over a thousand people watched the wallcasts during each of the performances in the center's opening week. By the end of the park's first year, The Miami Herald wrote that the free films, video art, and concert wallcasts there had "produced a much-needed sense of community."

== Construction ==
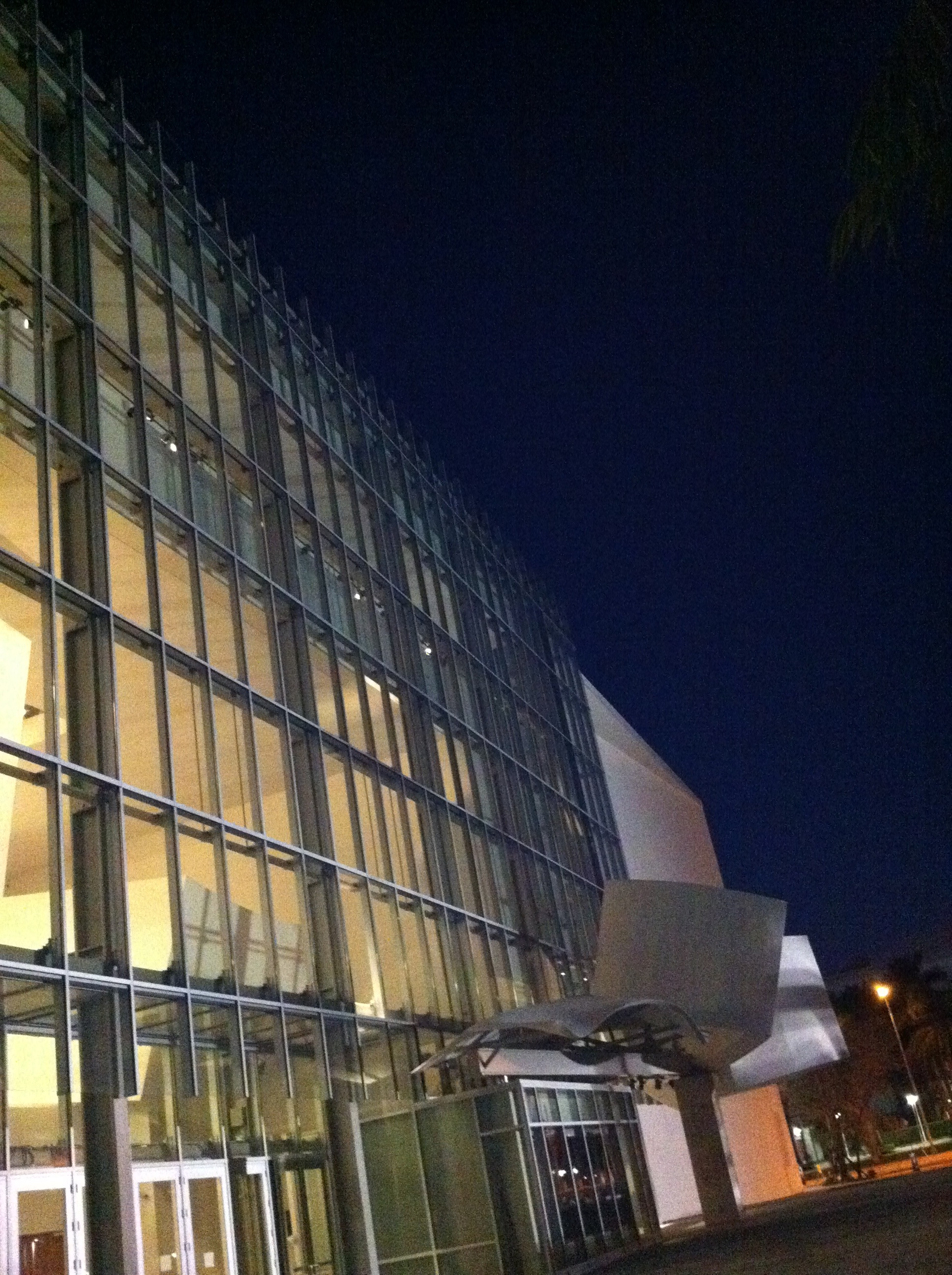
Exterior of the center at night

The New World Symphony was constructed by Facchina Construction Company, LLC and its team led by Jesus Vazquez, John Monts, Jazer Challenger and Modesto Millo. The acoustics for the center were designed by Yasuhisa Toyota. Gehry and Toyota had previously worked together on the Walt Disney Concert Hall in Los Angeles. The intentionally small seating arrangement is steeply banked, allowing concertgoers to be close to the musicians (no seat is more than thirteen rows from the stage). Gehry said "the audience is right in the music." Projections upon sail-like panels hanging from the hall ceiling allow performances to be accompanied by video presentations. For acoustical integrity, as well as to maintain the intimate feeling within the space, in lieu of standard acoustical plaster, BASWA Phon Finishes were applied to each panel allowing very specific amounts of sound absorption of high-frequency hertz bands. The center includes training facilities for the symphony.

The symphony's artistic director, Michael Tilson Thomas, was instrumental in emphasizing the public outreach and digital technology aspects of the center. (Gehry and Tilson Thomas share personal history and a long friendship, with Gehry sometimes having baby-sat for Tilson Thomas when both were growing up in the Los Angeles area.) A prime goal of the whole enterprise was to provide ongoing experiments and architectural support towards making classical music more accessible and enticing to younger generations. After its first half-season in the new venue, a New World Symphony official said, "Ticket sales have been phenomenal."

Unlike some of Gehry's best-known works, including the Disney Hall, the glass-and-white-plaster exterior is mostly rectangular and unassuming. (The acclaim for the prior work had been great enough to scare off potential clients, with Gehry saying, "When Disney opened seven years ago, I was never asked to do another concert hall!") This was done to stay in commonality with Miami Beach's predominantly plaster-and-glass architectural look, where Gehry's usual use of metals would have seemed out of place. However, once inside the atrium, which is lit by the sky during the daytime, the architect's usual assemblage of curved forms dominates, especially in a jumbled stack of over thirty rehearsal rooms, offices, recording facilities, and the like. As Tilson Thomas said of the initial design process, "Gradually it started to turn into one of Frank's buildings turned inside-out, which is essentially what it is – and that it was going to be mostly like Miami."

== Reception ==
Reviews of the New World Center have been favorable. Christopher Hawthorne of the Los Angeles Times wrote: "This is a piece of architecture that dares you to underestimate it or write it off at first glance." Nicolai Ouroussoff, architecture critic of The New York Times, stated that Tilson Thomas and Gehry had "created a building ... that spills over with populist ideas, sometimes to the point of distraction.... it reflects Mr. Gehry's belief that music, like other creative endeavors, should be more than an aesthetic matter. As a shared experience, one that reaches each of us at our emotional core, it helps unite us into a civilized community." Arrival of the center was hailed by Cathleen McGuigan, architecture writer for The Daily Beast, who said that "Miami Beach is [now] home to world-class architecture and the sense of solid permanence that such buildings bring." Victoria Newhouse of Architectural Record wrote: "A welcoming openness to the exterior is provided by the atrium and reinforced by the Wallcasts, and the auditorium combines intimacy with remarkable physical and acoustical flexibility. The magic sparked by the collaboration of Gehry and Thomas just might fulfill their hope to turn around a perceived faltering interest in classical music by the young." Gehry's role also confirmed that the "starchitect" phenomenon had reached the Miami area, following Herzog & de Meuron's 1111 Lincoln Road the year before and with that firms's new Miami Art Museum in the works as well.

The 100,641-square-foot (9,349.9 m^{2}) building cost some $160 million. Of that, $15 million came from the city of Miami Beach, $25 million from Miami-Dade County, and the rest from private donations and the sale of the New World Symphony's previous home, the Lincoln Theater. Ground was broken for the structure in January 2008. It was built on the site of two old parking lots. A new parking garage was also constructed as part of the project.

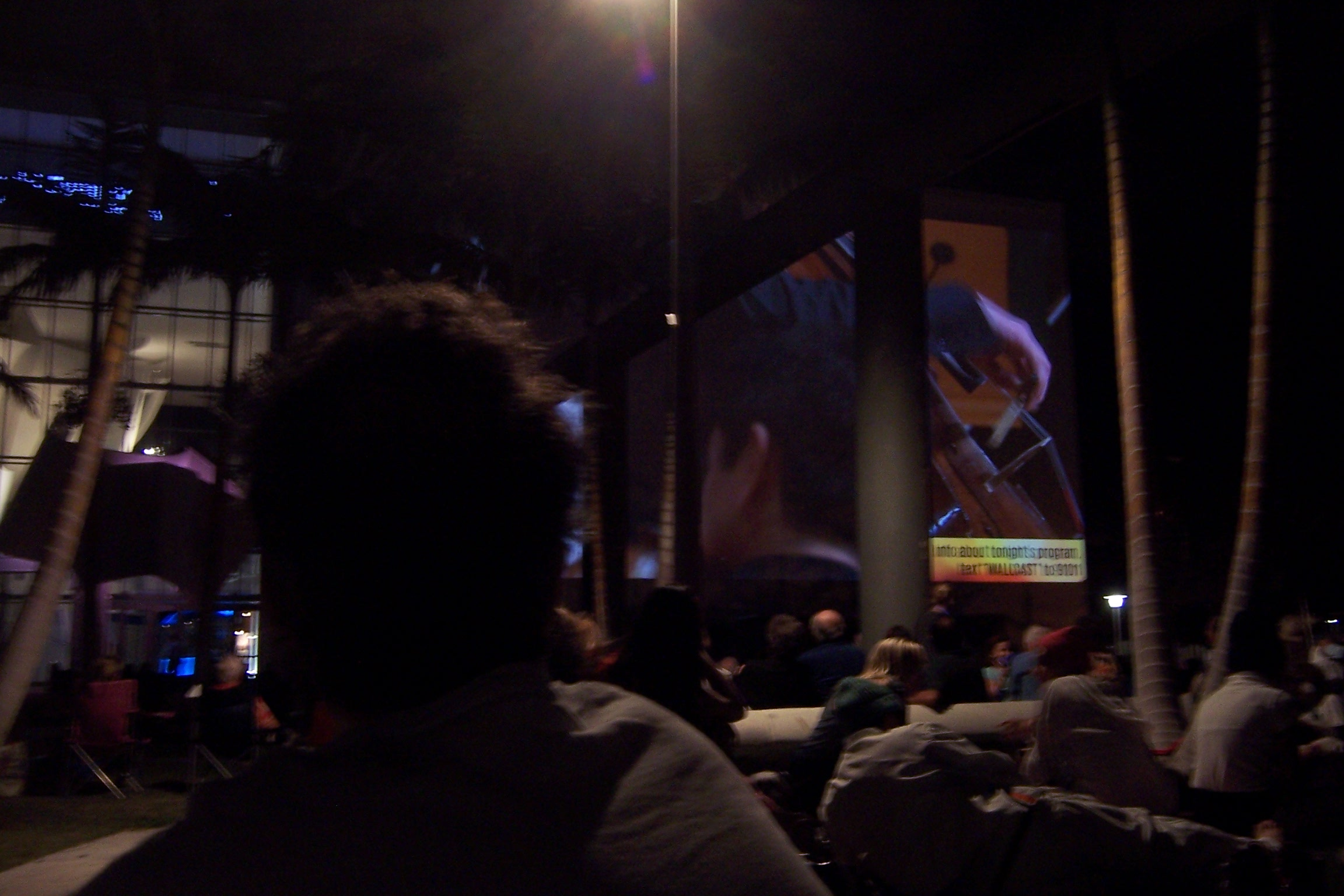
People watching a live performance "wallcast" outside the building

== See also ==
- List of works by Frank Gehry
