= Strangers No More =

- Directed by: Karen Goodman; Kirk Simon
- Cinematography: Buddy Squires
- Production companies: Simon & Goodman Picture Company
- Distributed by: HBO
- Release date: 2010
- Running time: 40 minutes

Strangers No More is a 2010 short documentary film about a school in Tel Aviv, Israel, where children from 48 countries and diverse backgrounds come together to learn. The parents of these children are among over 300,000 transnational migrant workers who have arrived in Israel—some with government authorization and others undocumented.

The film follows three students as they struggle to acclimate to life in Israel and slowly unveil their stories of hardship. Strangers No More was shot on location at the Bialik-Rogozin School in Tel Aviv. It is produced and directed by Karen Goodman and Kirk Simon of Simon & Goodman Picture Company, whose films have received four Academy Award nominations and three Emmy Awards. It won best Short Documentary at the Academy Awards in 2011.

== Premiere and screenings ==
Strangers No More premiered on September 24, 2010, at the Laemmle Theatres Sunset 5 Theatre in West Hollywood, California. It has also screened in cities worldwide through the Shorts International OSCAR®-Nominated Short Films 2011 program. On January 25, 2011, the Academy of Motion Picture Arts and Sciences announced Strangers No More as being nominated for the 83rd Academy Awards for the Best Documentary Short Subject category and later won in the February 27, 2011 ceremony.

The film made its television debut on HBO on December 5, 2011.
