= Lin Arison =

American philanthropist (1937–2025)

Marilyn Arison
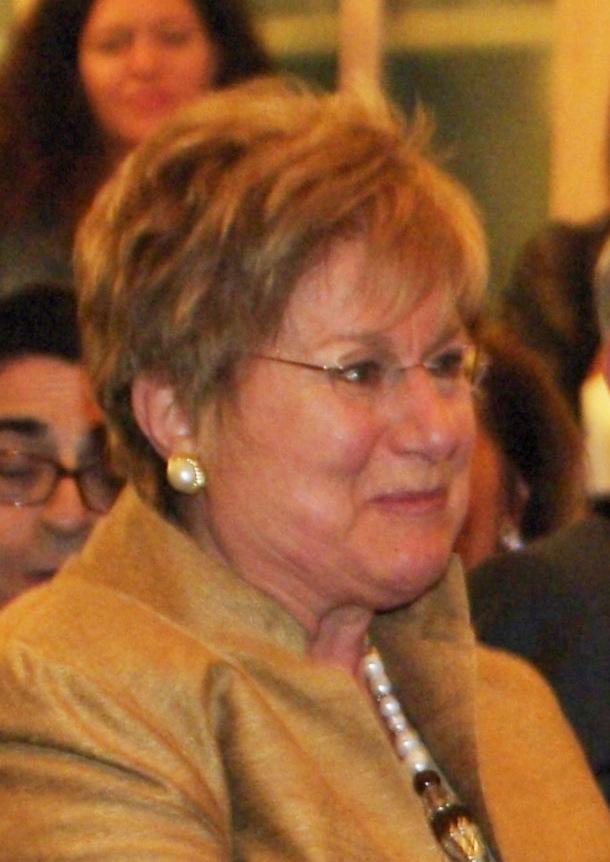
- Arison in 2008
- Born: Marilyn Barbara Arison; May 10, 1937
- Died: October 1, 2025 (aged 88)
- Spouse: Ted Arison (m. 1967; died 1999)
- Children: 4, including stepchildren Micky and Shari

Marilyn Barbara Arison (May 10, 1937 – October 1, 2025) was an American philanthropist who was the co-founder of the National YoungArts Foundation and the New World Symphony. She was the widow of Ted Arison, founder of Carnival Cruise Lines, and a real estate investor in Florida.

Arison was an arts education advocate and a philanthropist. In 2007, she published a book about Van Gogh and impressionism, featuring her personal travel memoir alongside photographs by Neil Folberg.

She was awarded the National Medal of Arts by President Barack Obama at the White House on July 10, 2013. Arison died on October 1, 2025, at the age of 88.

== Works ==
- Arison, Lin; Folberg, Neil (2007). Travels with Van Gogh and the Impressionists: Discovering the Connections. New York: Abbeville Press Publishers. ISBN 9780789209320. OCLC 77520736.
