= Chimps: So Like Us =

1990 film

- Directed by: Karen Goodman; Kirk Simon
- Produced by: Karen Goodman; Kirk Simon
- Cinematography: Kirk Simon; Buddy Squires; Gary Steele
- Edited by: Sarah Stein
- Production companies: Simon & Goodman Picture Company
- Distributed by: HBO; Direct Cinema (video)
- Release date: 1990
- Country: United States
- Language: English

Chimps: So Like Us is a 1990 American short documentary film about chimpanzees and the work of Jane Goodall directed by Kirk Simon and Karen Goodman. It was nominated for an Academy Award for Best Documentary Short. The half-hour film, shot on location in New York, Arizona and Tanzania. The film has been broadcast extensively on HBO.
