= New World Symphony (orchestra) =

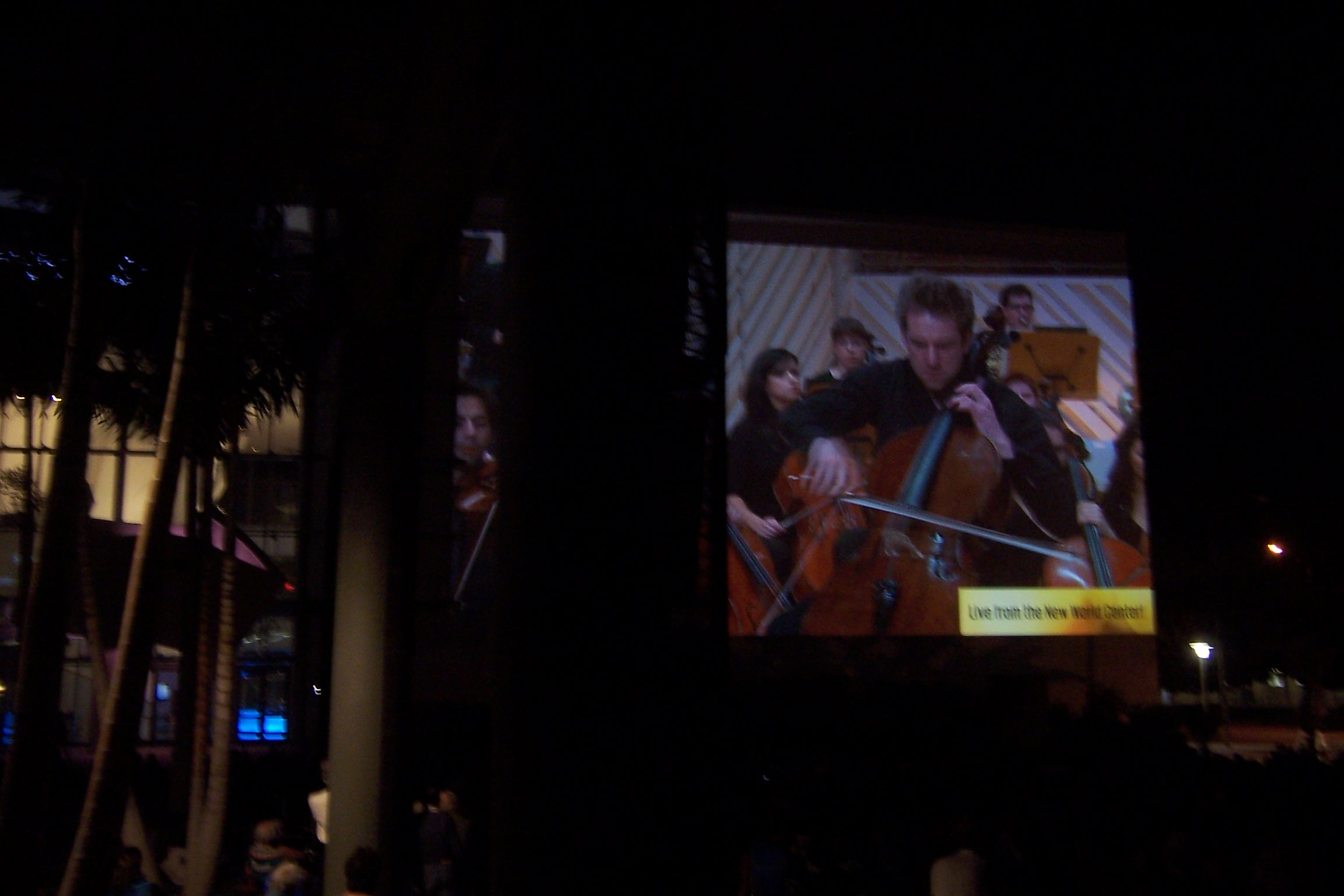
- Members of the New World Symphony playing the Dvorak Cello Concerto, with soloist Johannes Moser as seen during a 2011 live outside "wallcast" at the New World Center

Location
- 500 17th Street; Miami Beach, Florida; United States; 25.791°N 80.133°W

Information
- Type: Full-time orchestral academy
- Established: 1987
- Artistic director: Stéphane Denève
- Website: www.nws.edu

The New World Symphony (NWS) is an American orchestral academy based in Miami Beach, Florida. Established in 1987, the organization is a training ensemble for young musicians in preparation for professional careers in classical music. Since 2011, the New World Symphony has its headquarters in the New World Center.

== History ==
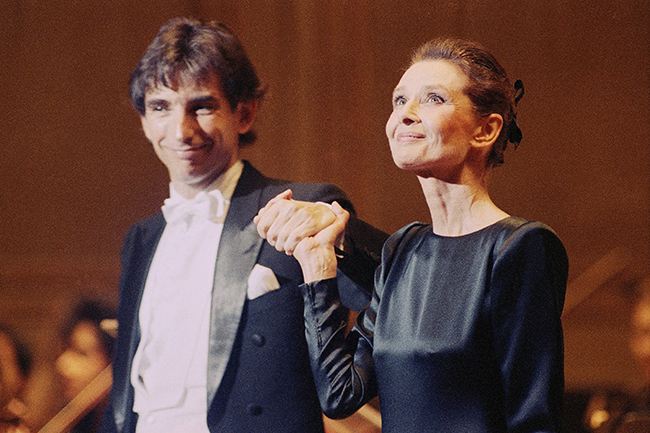
Tilson Thomas and Audrey Hepburn in 1990

In 1987, Michael Tilson Thomas established the New World Symphony, with initial financial assistance from Ted Arison, the founder of Carnival Cruise Lines. Thomas and Arison had similar visions of a training orchestra for young conservatory graduates to assist them in finding employment with professional orchestras. The New World Symphony gave its first public concert on 4 February 1988 in Miami. By the time of Arison's death in 1999, he had contributed $62M USD to the organization.

The New World Symphony offers three-year fellowships, where the program offers a wide range of performance and educational opportunities in both domestic and international venues. The program offers opportunities for fellows to design and present their own concerts, which often feature seldom-heard works for unusual instrumentation. The training also includes mock auditions, financial management, donor and media relations, as well as opportunities for teaching in local schools.

The New World Symphony presents a season of concerts from September to May at the 756-seat concert hall of the New World Center. Performances include full-orchestra concerts, a chamber music series, a new music series, percussion consort series, small ensemble concerts, a family series, and special festivals and recitals.

The orchestra's 2010 tour through Umbria was documented in the book 'Feast For The Senses', authored by Lin Arison and Diana Still, and featuring photographs by Neil Folberg.

On June 29, 2011, the New World Symphony Orchestra received the first place award for "Adventurous Programming" (group 2 orchestras) from ASCAP for its strong commitment to new American music.

Tilson Thomas stood down as the organisation's artistic director, effective 1 June 2022, in conjunction with his prior public disclosure of his health status. In September 2022, the NWS announced Stéphane Denève as its new artistic director, with immediate effect, and the transition of Tilson Thomas to the role of artistic director laureate. Tilson Thomas held the title of artistic director laureate until his death in April 2026. In June 2026, the NWS announced the extension of Denève's contract as artistic director through the 2031–2032 season.
