= The Pulitzer at 100 =

- Poster
- Directed by: Kirk Simon
- Produced by: Nikkos J. Frangos; George T. Lemos; Kirk Simon; Ron Simon
- Cinematography: Stephen Kazmierski; Buddy Squires
- Edited by: Emily Williams
- Music by: Wendy Blackstone
- Production companies: Marblemen Productions; Simon + Film
- Distributed by: First Run Features
- Release date: November 6, 2016 (Denver International Film Festival)
- Country: United States
- Language: English

The Pulitzer at 100 is a 2016 documentary film that was directed by American film director Kirk Simon. The film details the history and impact of the Pulitzer Prize.

== Synopsis ==
The documentary examines the history of the Pulitzer Prizes, which were established in 1917 by Columbia University. The institution had been left money by newspaper publisher Joseph Pulitzer, who left instructions for the university to found both a school of journalism as well as the Pulitzer Prizes. The documentary features interviews from award recipients such as Paula Vogel, Tony Kushner, and Ayad Akhtar. The documentary also features the Gianakos-Safos Collection, a private collection that also serves as an archive of Pulitzer Prize-winning works across fiction, drama, poetry, biography, history, general nonfiction, and memoir.

== Development ==
Director Kirk Simon has stated that he chose to create the film after learning of the stories of the awards, the recipients, and the award-winning works. The documentary was also inspired by the Gianakos-Safos Collection.

== Release ==
The Pulitzer at 100 premiered at the Denver International Film Festival on November 6, 2016. The film also received a screening in New York City on July 21, 2017 at the Lincoln Plaza Cinema.

== Reception ==
The Pulitzer at 100 holds a rating of 22% on Rotten Tomatoes, based on 9 reviews.
