= Sara Fishko =

Director and filmmaker

Sara Fishko is an American broadcast journalist and documentary filmmaker known for her coverage of art, music, culture and media.

== Career ==
From 1999 to 2021, she was the creator and host of Fishko Files on WNYC, producing hundreds of short-form episodes on culture and cultural history. In 2015, she directed The Jazz Loft According to W. Eugene Smith which debuted at the New Orleans Film Festival and was a New York Times critics' pick.

Earlier, she edited numerous award-winning documentary films. Her work at WNYC also featured longer interviews with important musical figures including Keith Jarrett, Oscar Peterson and Dave Brubeck.

== Awards and honors ==
- 2013 National Headliners Grand Award
- 2010 Deems Taylor Multimedia Award
- 1989 News and Documentary Emmy Award for Film Editing

== Filmography ==
=== As Director ===
- The Jazz Loft According to W. Eugene Smith (2015)

=== As Film Editor ===
- Jerusalem Peace (1977)
- A Doonesbury Special (1977)
- In Dark Places (1978)
- Carl Sandburg: Echoes and Silences (1982)
- The Global Assembly Line (1986)
- No Applause, Just Throw Money (1989)
- Destination Mozart: A Night at the Opera with Peter Sellars (1990)
- Frontline: Innocence Lost (1991)
- Buckminster Fuller: Thinking Out Loud (1996)
