= Feloni =

American rapper

FELONI
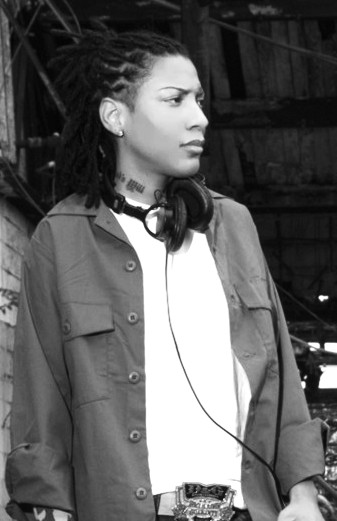
- Feloni in 2006

Background information
- Also known as: Binah
- Born: Trish R. Best; Detroit, Michigan, U.S.
- Genres: Hip Hop, Rap, R&B, Soft Rock, Alternative,
- Occupations: Rapper, songwriter, producer, record label CEO
- Years active: 2005–present
- Label: Trak Diamond Records LLC (2005–present)

Trish Best, known by her stage name Feloni, is an American rapper from Detroit, Michigan. Her coming out as lesbian was featured on MTV's LOGO documentary show Coming Out Stories.

== Honors ==
- Winner of Broadjam's February 2007 Rap Lyric Contest
- Nominated for Best Rapper of 2007 by the Los Angeles Music Awards

== Discography ==
- A Woman's Revenge (2007) Feloni's Debut Album.
- Girl Thing feat Feloni (2008) Collaboration with Lori Michaels on Album Living My Life Out Loud.
- I Ain't Scared of U (2010) I Ain't Scared of U Single.
- Ode to D.B. feat Riot Baby(2017) Ode to D.B. Single.
- Blame It on Nothin'(Remastered) (2019) Single.
- Pussi Can (Short Version) (2019)
