= Rehearsing a Dream =

- Directed by: Karen Goodman; Kirk Simon
- Produced by: Karen Goodman; Kirk Simon
- Cinematography: Buddy Squires; Steve McCarthy
- Edited by: Nancy Baker
- Production companies: Simon & Goodman Picture Co.
- Release date: 2006
- Running time: 39 minutes
- Country: United States
- Language: English

Rehearsing a Dream is a short documentary directed and produced by Oscar nominees Karen Goodman and Kirk Simon. The film premiered on HBO in August 2007 and was nominated for an Academy Award for Best Documentary Short.
