= Neil Folberg =

American-Israeli photographer and gallerist

Neil Folberg ניל פולברג
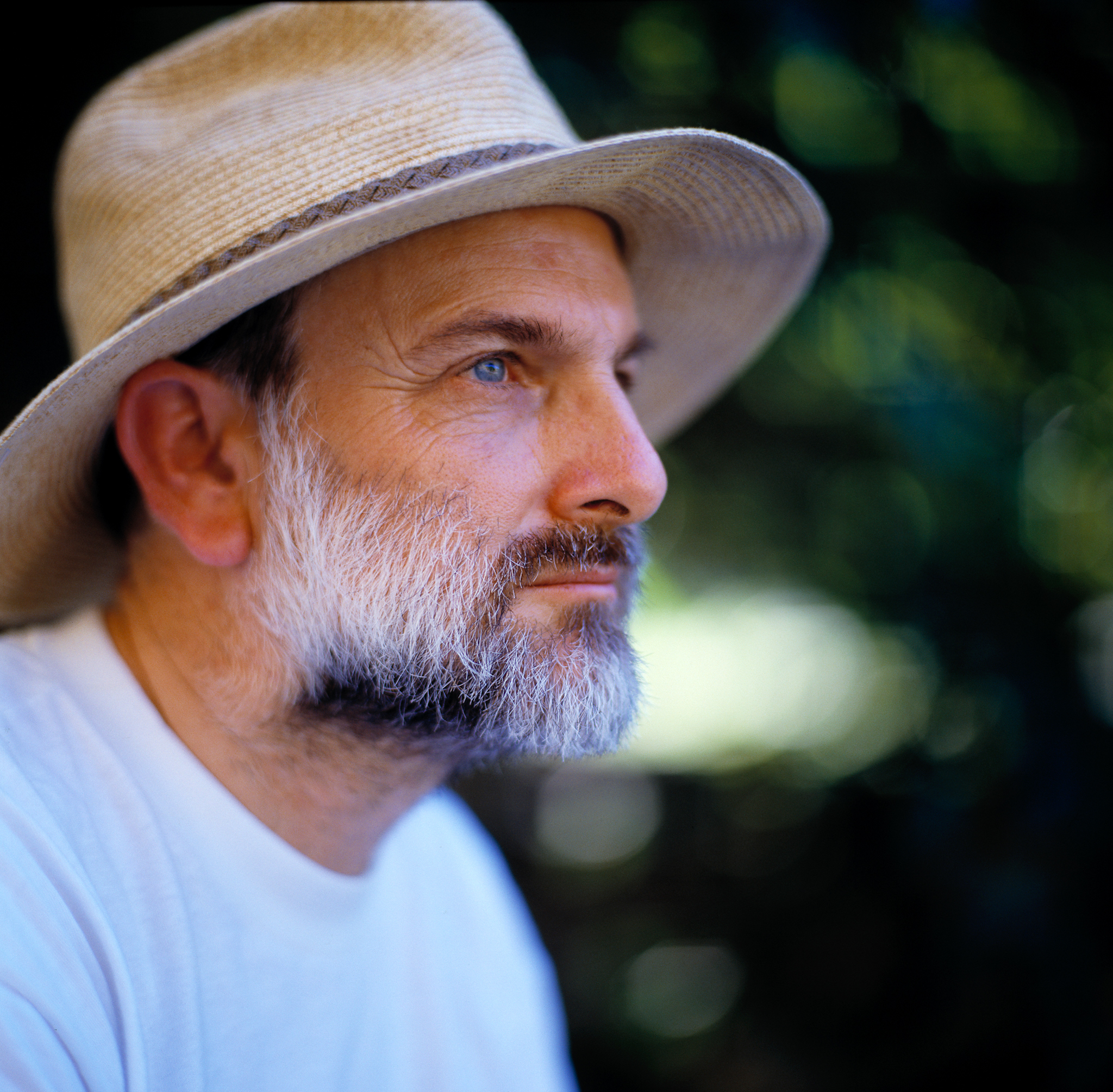
- Born: April 7, 1950 (age 75); San Francisco, California US
- Education: University of California, Berkeley
- Known for: Photography
- Awards: National Jewish Book Award (1995)

Neil Folberg (Hebrew: ניל פולברג; born April 7, 1950) is an American-Israeli photographer and gallerist.

== Early life and education ==
Folberg was born in San Francisco in 1950. His father was Joseph Folberg, a San Francisco gallerist.

At the age of 16, Folberg was invited to study with Ansel Adams at a photographic workshop which Adams had established in Yosemite National Park. Shortly after, in 1967, he enrolled at the University of California at Berkeley, intending to focus on the natural sciences, but ultimately switching to photography studies, under the guidance of William Garnett—who became the head of Berkeley's school of architecture and design at the time—and under the mentorship of Ansel Adams.

== Photography career ==
Folberg moved to Israel in 1976, where he began a series of color photographs of the southern desert landscapes. These—along with photographs he took in the Sinai Desert and Jordan—appeared in his first book, In a Desert Land, published by Abbeville in 1987. Folberg's next book, And I Shall Dwell Among Them, consisted of a series of photographs, commissioned by the Aperture Foundation, in which he examined the internal and external architecture of historic synagogues throughout the world. The book was published by Aperture in 1995, and went on to win the National Jewish Book Award for Visual Arts in 1996.

In 2001 Aperture published Folberg's book, Celestial Nights, a series of black and white photographs, shot in the late 1990s and early 2000s, created by digitally combining separate negatives, of starry nights along with detailed representations of the earth beneath them.

Folberg later teamed with Lin Arison to create the book Travels with Van Gogh and the Impressionists (Abbeville, 2007).

In 2013, Folberg released Serpent's Chronicle (Abbeville), a series of staged photographs depicting the biblical myth of Adam and Eve from the snake's perspective. The book was accompanied by a solo exhibition of the series at the Reuven Rubin Museum in Tel Aviv.

In 2016, Folberg released Taking Measure, a series of 32 photographs shot over two years in Iceland and the Faroe Islands. The book won the prize for best digitally printed book, at the British Book Design & Production Awards, the following year.

In 2021, Folberg released A Mirror in Macedonia, printed by Lecturis. The book featured some of Floberg's earliest unpublished work, photos he shot in 1971 while traveling in rural Macedonia as a student, on a grant-funded fellowship he received from UC Berkeley.

== Publications ==
- Sinai. Adam Publishers, Jerusalem 1983.
- In a Desert Land. Abbeville, 1987.
- And I Shall Dwell Among Them. Aperture, 1995
- Celestial Nights. Aperture, 2001.
- Travels with Van Gogh and the Impressionists. Abbeville, 2007. With Lin Arison.
- Serpent's Chronicle. Abbeville, 2013.
- Taking Measure. 2016.
- A Mirror in Macedonia. Lecturis, 2021. With an autobiographical essay by Folberg, and an afterword by Ilina Jakimovska.

== Collections ==
Folberg's work is held in the following public collections:

- Metropolitan Museum of Art, New York City
- Bibliothéque Nationale, Paris
- Smithsonian Institution, Washington, D.C.
- Museum Ludwig, Cologne
- San Francisco Museum of Modern Art
- LACMA
- Philadelphia Museum of Art
- Museum of Fine Arts, Boston
- National Gallery of Australia
- Yale University Art Gallery
- Nelson-Atkins Museum of Art
- The David and Alfred Smart Museum of Art
- Canadian Centre for Architecture
- George Eastman Museum
- Tel Aviv Museum of Art
- Israel Museum

== Jerusalem gallery ==
In 1998, following his father's death, Folberg moved his father's Mission Street "Vision Gallery" to Jerusalem, Israel, where it remains to this day.
