= Karen Goodman =

American film director

- Occupations: Film producer and director
- Years active: 1978–present
- Spouse: Kirk Simon (1987-2011)
- Children: 2

Karen Goodman is an American film and television director and producer, best known for her work on various documentaries. She has been nominated for an Academy Award in the Best Documentary (Short Subject) category four times for The Children's Storefront (1988), Chimps: So Like Us (1990), Rehearsing a Dream (2007), and Strangers No More (2010). Goodman won once for producing and directing Strangers No More at the 83rd Academy Awards. The win was shared with Kirk Simon, with whom she worked on Chimps: So Like Us and Rehearsing a Dream as well. She has further received four Primetime Emmy nominations, winning once for Masterclass in 2014.

== Biography ==
Goodman was born to a Jewish family and began her film career at Hampshire College in Amherst, Massachusetts in 1978, where she shot a film about masked dancing in Indonesia. The film earned her a grant from the Ford Foundation which ultimately paved the way for her career in filmmaking.

Goodman has her own film production company, the Simon & Goodman Picture Company, together with her husband, Kirk Simon, with whom she worked on most of her films.
