= Kirk Simon =

American film director

- Born: July 25, 1954; Philadelphia, Pennsylvania, U.S.
- Died: April 14, 2018 (aged 63); New York City, New York, U.S.
- Occupations: Film producer and director
- Years active: 1984–2018
- Spouse(s): Karen Goodman (1987–2011); Mina Farbood

Kirk Simon (July 25, 1954 – April 14, 2018) was an American filmmaker, best known for his work on various documentaries.

== Career ==
Simon received a nomination for an Academy Award four times, winning once. Simon produced three films nominated for the Best Documentary (Short Subject), including Chimps: So Like Us (1990), Rehearsing a Dream (2007), and Strangers No More (2010); he won the award for the latter film at the 83rd Academy Awards, and shared the win with Karen Goodman with whom he worked on all three films. Simon also received a nomination in the category of the Best Documentary Feature for producing Isaac in America: A Journey with Isaac Bashevis Singer (1986). In 2016, he produced a documentary on the centenary of the Pulitzer prize called The Pulitzer at 100.

== Personal life ==
Simon married Karen Goodman, his longtime creative partner, in 1987. The couple had two children and divorced in 2011. Simon later married Mina Farbood, and the couple had one daughter. Simon had three grandchildren. Simon died on April 14, 2018, in New York City, from cardiac arrest.
